= 1994 ATCC Perth round =

(Western Australia) 1994 Barbagallo ATCC round
Event Information
- Round 9 of 10 in the 1994 Australian Touring Car Championship
- Date: 1-3 July 1994
- Location: Perth, Western Australia
- Venue: Barbagallo Raceway
- Weather: Overcast

Results
Race 1
Distance	22 laps	53 km
Pole position	Mark Skaife; Gibson Motorsport	1:02.99
Winner	Tony Longhurst; LoGaMo Racing	21:58.4482
Race 2
Distance	22 laps	53 km
Winner	Alan Jones; Glenn Seton Racing	22:01.2955
Round Results
First	Alan Jones; Glenn Seton Racing	34 pts
Second	Larry Perkins; Perkins Engineering	32 pts
Third	John Bowe; Dick Johnson Racing	24 pts

The 1994 Barbagallo ATCC round was the ninth round of the 1994 Australian Touring Car Championship. It was held on the weekend of 1 to 3 July at Barbagallo Raceway in Perth, Western Australia.

== Race results ==
=== Qualifying ===
Pos.	No.	Name	Team	Car	Time
1	2	(Australia) Mark Skaife	Gibson Motorsport	Holden Commodore (VP)	1:02.990
2	1	(Australia) Glenn Seton	Glenn Seton Racing	Ford Falcon (EB)	1:03.440
3	05	(Australia) Peter Brock	Holden Racing Team	Holden Commodore (VP)	1:03.450
4	25	(Australia) Tony Longhurst	LoGaMo Racing	Holden Commodore (VP)	1:03.550
5	015	(Australia) Tomas Mezera	Holden Racing Team	Holden Commodore (VP)	1:03.880
6	7	(Australia) Neil Crompton	Wayne Gardner Racing	Holden Commodore (VP)	1:03.920
7	6	(New Zealand) Jim Richards	Gibson Motorsport	Holden Commodore (VP)	1:03.990
8	30	(Australia) Alan Jones	Alan Jones Racing	Ford Falcon (EB)	1:04.030
9	4	(Australia) Wayne Gardner	Wayne Gardner Racing	Holden Commodore (VP)	1:04.190
10	17	(Australia) Dick Johnson	Dick Johnson Racing	Ford Falcon (EB)	1:04.580
11	18	(Australia) John Bowe	Dick Johnson Racing	Ford Falcon (EB)	1:04.990
12	23	(Australia) Paul Morris	LoGaMo Racing	Holden Commodore (VP)	1:04.990
13	11	(Australia) Larry Perkins	Perkins Engineering	Holden Commodore (VP)	1:04.990
14	28	(Australia) Kevin Waldock	Playscape Racing	Ford Falcon (EB)	1:07.770
15	35	(Australia) Ian Love	Ian Love Racing	Holden Commodore (VP)	1:07.880
16	26	(Australia) Don Watson	Don Watson Racing	Holden Commodore (VP)	1:08.040
17	12	(Australia) Bob Jones	Ampol Max 3 Racing	Holden Commodore (VP)	1:08.740
18	77	(Australia) Alf Barbagallo	Barbagallo Motorsport	Holden Commodore (VP)	1:10.600
	16	(Australia) Graham Blythman	Graham Blythman	Holden Commodore (VP)	no time

=== Race 1 ===
Seton led Skaife off the line, followed by Brock, Longhurst and Mezera. Skaife started to fall through the pack, whilst others were moving up. The likes of Longhurst, Perkins and Jones were climbing through the pack, with Longhurst advancing to second and closing in on Seton. With a couple laps to go, Seton's car experienced engine problems and subsequently retired from the race. This handed the lead and the win to Tony Longhurst - giving him his first win of the 1994 season. Larry Perkins was second and Alan Jones finished third, followed closely by the Dick Johnson Racing duo of Bowe and Johnson.

Pos.	No.	Name	Team	Car	Laps	Time/Retired	Grid
1	25	(Australia) Tony Longhurst	LoGaMo Racing	Holden Commodore (VP)	22	21:58.4482	4
2	11	(Australia) Larry Perkins	Perkins Engineering	Holden Commodore (VP)	22	+ 5.126	13
3	30	(Australia) Alan Jones	Glenn Seton Racing	Ford Falcon (EB)	22	+ 6.676	8
4	17	(Australia) Dick Johnson	Dick Johnson Racing	Ford Falcon (EB)	22	+ 7.212	10
5	18	(Australia) John Bowe	Dick Johnson Racing	Ford Falcon (EB)	22	+ 7.560	11
6	6	(New Zealand) Jim Richards	Gibson Motorsport	Holden Commodore (VP)	22	+ 10.138	7
7	4	(Australia) Wayne Gardner	Wayne Gardner Racing	Holden Commodore (VP)	22	+ 12.814	9
8	05	(Australia) Peter Brock	Holden Racing Team	Holden Commodore (VP)	22	+ 13.150	3
9	23	(Australia) Paul Morris	LoGaMo Racing	Holden Commodore (VP)	22	+ 16.081	12
10	7	(Australia) Neil Crompton	Wayne Gardner Racing	Holden Commodore (VP)	22	+ 16.583	6
11	015	(Australia) Tomas Mezera	Holden Racing Team	Holden Commodore (VP)	22	+ 21.112	5
12	26	(Australia) Don Watson	Don Watson Racing	Holden Commodore (VP)	22	+ 31.744	16
13	12	(Australia) Bob Jones	Ampol Max 3 Racing	Holden Commodore (VP)	22	+ 32.900	17
14	35	(Australia) Ian Love	Ian Love Racing	Holden Commodore (VP)	22	+ 49.117	15
15	77	(Australia) Alf Barbagallo	Barbagallo Motorsport	Holden Commodore (VP)	21	+ 1 lap	18
16	16	(Australia) Graham Blythman	Graham Blythman Racing	Holden Commodore (VP)	21	+ 1 lap	19
Ret	1	(Australia) Glenn Seton	Glenn Seton Racing	Ford Falcon (EB)	20	Retired	2
Ret	2	(Australia) Mark Skaife	Gibson Motorsport	Holden Commodore (VP)	19	Retired	1
Ret	28	(Australia) Kevin Waldock	Playscape Racing	Ford Falcon (EB)	16	Retired	14
Fastest lap: Glenn Seton (Glenn Seton Racing) - 58.338

=== Race 2 ===
Alan Jones launched off the line, into an early lead ahead of Perkins and Longhurst. Dick Johnson had an early exit from the race with engine issues. In a closely fought battle between Wayne Gardner and Paul Morris, Morris spun Gardner with several cars needing to take avoiding action and not least sent Gardner falling down the pack. Despite the tremendous pace in race one, Longhurst couldn't replicate it for race two. From pole on the grid, he would finish seventh, whilst Alan Jones would achieve his first round win of the year, with Perkins in second and Bowe in third.

Pos.	No.	Name	Team	Car	Laps	Time/Retired	Grid
1	30	(Australia) Alan Jones	Glenn Seton Racing	Ford Falcon (EB)	22	22:01.2955	3
2	11	(Australia) Larry Perkins	Perkins Engineering	Holden Commodore (VP)	22	+ 2.670	2
3	18	(Australia) John Bowe	Dick Johnson Racing	Ford Falcon (EB)	22	+ 3.719	5
4	6	(New Zealand) Jim Richards	Gibson Motorsport	Holden Commodore (VP)	22	+ 13.348	6
5	015	(Australia) Tomas Mezera	Holden Racing Team	Holden Commodore (VP)	22	+ 13.385	11
6	7	(Australia) Neil Crompton	Wayne Gardner Racing	Holden Commodore (VP)	22	+ 13.610	10
7	23	(Australia) Paul Morris	LoGaMo Racing	Holden Commodore (VP)	22	+ 14.468	9
8	25	(Australia) Tony Longhurst	LoGaMo Racing	Holden Commodore (VP)	22	+ 18.260	1
9	2	(Australia) Mark Skaife	Gibson Motorsport	Holden Commodore (VP)	22	+ 20.149	17
10	05	(Australia) Peter Brock	Holden Racing Team	Holden Commodore (VP)	22	+ 35.880	8
11	26	(Australia) Don Watson	Don Watson Racing	Holden Commodore (VP)	22	+ 49.480	12
12	28	(Australia) Kevin Waldock	Playscape Racing	Ford Falcon (EB)	22	+ 55.557	18
13	35	(Australia) Ian Love	Ian Love Racing	Holden Commodore (VP)	22	+ 56.690	14
14	12	(Australia) Bob Jones	Ampol Max 3 Racing	Holden Commodore (VP)	22	+ 57.815	13
15	77	(Australia) Alf Barbagallo	Barbagllo Motorsport	Holden Commodore (VP)	21	+ 1 lap	15
16	16	(Australia) Graham Blythman	Graham Blythman Racing	Holden Commodore (VP)	21	+ 1 lap	16
Ret	4	(Australia) Wayne Gardner	Wayne Gardner Racing	Holden Commodore (VP)	14	Retired	7
Ret	17	(Australia) Dick Johnson	Dick Johnson Racing	Ford Falcon (EB)	2	Retired	4
Fastest lap: Alan Jones (Glenn Seton Racing) - 58.741

== Championship Standings ==
Drivers' Championship standings

Pos.	No.	Driver	Team	Points
1	2	(Australia) Mark Skaife	Gibson Motorsport	285
2	05	(Australia) Peter Brock	Holden Racing Team	190
3	1	(Australia) Glenn Seton	Glenn Seton Racing	185
4	11	(Australia) Larry Perkins	Perkins Engineering	166
5	30	(Australia) Alan Jones	Glenn Seton Racing	163
