= 1993 Australian 2.0 Litre Touring Car Championship =

1993 ASTC season

Seasons
- ← none 1994 →

The 1993 Australian 2.0 Litre Touring Car Championship was a CAMS sanctioned Australian motor racing title for drivers of under 2.0-litre cars complying with the provisions of the FISA Class II section of Australian Group 3A Touring Car regulations. It was contested in conjunction with the 1993 Australian Touring Car Championship, which began on 28 February 1993 at Amaroo Park and ended on 8 August at Oran Park Raceway after nine rounds. It was the third Australian 2.0 Litre Touring Car Championship and the first for cars aligned with FISA Class II regulations and thus the fore-runner of the Australian Super Touring Championship.

The championship was won by Peter Doulman, driving a 2.0-litre version of his old Group A BMW M3 (the car was an ex-JPS Team BMW and Mobil 1 Racing team car that had been built by Frank Gardner's JPS Team in 1987. Doulman had raced the car since 1989 with a 2.3 L engine). The championship went down to the wire with Doulman beating out the Caltex Team Toyota of John Smith. Smith's Caltex team boss Colin Bond finished third in the championship despite not being a starter in the final round at Oran Park.

Most of the 2.0 Litre field consisted of regular 'baby car class' competitors from Group A, including Frank Binding, Brad Stratton, Mike Conway, and veteran racer Bob Holden.

== Teams and drivers ==
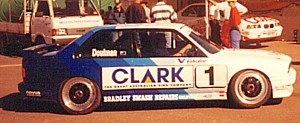
The BMW M3 of 1993 Australian 2.0 Litre Touring Car Champion, Peter Doulman (pictured in 1994)

The following teams and drivers competed in the 1993 Australian 2.0 Litre Touring Car Championship.

Team	Car	No.	Driver
Caltex Team Toyota	Toyota Corolla AE90 FX-GT; Toyota Corolla Seca AE93	6	(Australia) John Smith
Caltex Team Toyota	Toyota Corolla Seca AE93	8	(Australia) Colin Bond
Bob Holden Motors	Toyota Sprinter AE86	13	(Australia) Bob Holden
Bob Holden Motors	Toyota Corolla FX-GT AE82	75	(Australia) Frank Binding
M3 Motorsport	BMW M3	52	(Australia) John Cotter
M3 Motorsport	BMW M3	53	(Australia) Peter Doulman
Brad Stratton	Toyota Corolla FX-GT AE82	72	(Australia) Brad Stratton
Easton Motorsport	Toyota Sprinter AE86	77	(Australia) Gregg Easton
Cadillac Productions	Toyota Sprinter AE86	79	(Australia) Mike Conway
Malcolm Rea	Toyota Sprinter AE86	88	(Australia) Ken Talbert (Australia) Malcolm Rea

== Race calendar ==
The championship was contested over nine rounds, held across six states.

Rd.	Circuit	Location / state	Date	Winning driver	Car	Team
1	Amaroo Park	Sydney, New South Wales	26–28 Feb	(Australia) Peter Doulman	BMW M3	M3 Motorsport
2	Symmons Plains Raceway	Launceston, Tasmania	12–14 Mar	(Australia) Peter Doulman	BMW M3	M3 Motorsport
3	Phillip Island Grand Prix Circuit	Phillip Island, Victoria	2–4 Apr	(Australia) Peter Doulman	BMW M3	M3 Motorsport
4	Lakeside International Raceway	Brisbane, Queensland	16–18 Apr	(Australia) Colin Bond	Toyota Corolla Seca AE93	Caltex Team Toyota
5	Winton Motor Raceway	Benalla, Victoria	14–16 May	(Australia) Peter Doulman	BMW M3	M3 Motorsport
6	Eastern Creek Raceway	Sydney, New South Wales	4–6 Jun	(Australia) Colin Bond	Toyota Corolla Seca AE93	Caltex Team Toyota
7	Mallala Motor Sport Park	Mallala, South Australia	2–4 Jul	(Australia) John Smith	Toyota Corolla Seca AE93	Caltex Team Toyota
8	Barbagallo Raceway	Perth, Western Australia	9–11 Jul	(Australia) John Smith	Toyota Corolla Seca AE93	Caltex Team Toyota
9	Oran Park Raceway	Sydney, New South Wales	6–8 Aug	(Australia) Peter Doulman	BMW M3	M3 Motorsport

== Points system ==
All rounds of the 1993 Australian 2.0 Litre Touring Car Championship were staged in conjunction with rounds of the 1993 Australian Touring Car Championship, which was open to both 2.0 Litre Touring Cars and 5.0 Litre Touring Cars.

At the opening round at Amaroo Park both the 2.0 Litre cars and the 5.0 Litre cars had a separate Heat of their own before competing together in the Final. Points towards the 1993 Australian 2.0 Litre Touring Car Championship were awarded on a 9–6–4–3–2–1 basis for the first six positions in the 2.0 Litre Heat.

At the Symmons Plains Raceway round only three 2.0 Litre cars were entered (Doulman, Smith and Bond), and they ran together with the 5.0 Litre cars in both the Heat and the Final. Points for the 2.0 Litre championship were awarded on a 9–6–4–3–2–1 basis for the first six positions in the 2.0 Litre class of the Heat. This practice was continued at all subsequent rounds even after 2.0 Litre grids returned to the size displayed at Amaroo.

Whilst drivers of 2.0 Litre cars finishing in the top ten outright positions in the Final were eligible to score points towards the Australian Touring Car Championship, in reality, no 2.0 Litre car finished in the top ten placings in the Final at any round.

== Championship results ==
Pos.	Driver	Car	Ama.	Sym.	Phi.	Lak.	Win.	Eas.	Mal.	Bar.	Ora.	Pts.
1	Peter Doulman	BMW M3	1st	1st	1st	3rd	1st	Ret	2nd	3rd	1st	59
2	John Smith	Toyota Corolla AE90 FX-GT; Toyota Corolla Seca AE93	2nd	2nd	2nd	2nd	2nd	Ret	1st	1st	Ret	48
3	Colin Bond	Toyota Corolla Seca AE93	Ret	3rd	3rd	1st	Ret	1st	Ret	2nd	DNS	32
4	Brad Stratton	Toyota Corolla FX-GT AE82	5th		5th	4th	3rd	5th	4th		4th	19
5	John Cotter	BMW M3	3rd					2nd			2nd	16
6	Mike Conway	Toyota Sprinter AE86	4th		4th		4th	3rd			5th	15
7	Bob Holden	Toyota Sprinter AE86					5th	6th	3rd		6th	8
7	Frank Binding	Toyota Corolla FX-GT AE82	6th			Ret		4th			3rd	8
9	Gregg Easton	Toyota Sprinter AE86				5th						2
10	Ken Talbert	Toyota Sprinter AE86	7th				6th					1
Pos.	Driver	Car	Ama.	Sym.	Phi.	Lak.	Win.	Eas.	Mal.	Bar.	Ora.	Pts.

Colour	Result
Gold	Winner
Silver	Second place
Bronze	Third place
Green	Points classification
Blue	Non-points classification
Blue	Non-classified finish (NC)
Purple	Retired, not classified (Ret)
Red	Did not qualify (DNQ)
Red	Did not pre-qualify (DNPQ)
Black	Disqualified (DSQ)
White	Did not start (DNS)
White	Withdrew (WD)
White	Race cancelled (C)
Blank	Did not practice (DNP)
Blank	Did not arrive (DNA)
Blank	Excluded (EX)

- Positions shown for Round 1 are those achieved in the 2.0 Litre Heat.
- Positions shown for Rounds 2 to 9 are those achieved in the 2.0 Litre class of the combined Heat.

== See also ==
1993 Australian Touring Car season
