= 1994 Australian Touring Car Championship =

Motor racing competition

Seasons
- ← 1993 1995 →

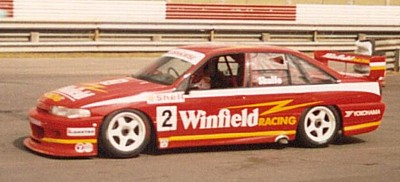
Gibson Motorsport Holden VP Commodore of Mark Skaife at Lakeside in April 1994

The 1994 Australian Touring Car Championship was an Australian motor racing competition for Touring Cars. The championship, which was sanctioned by the Confederation of Australian Motor Sport as an Australian Title, was the 35th Australian Touring Car Championship. Promoted as the Shell Australian Touring Car Championship, it was contested over 10 rounds between February and July 1994.

The championship was won by Mark Skaife driving a Gibson Motorsport Holden VP Commodore.

== Pre-season ==
The Ford EB Falcon and Holden VP Commodore were both homologated with new aerodynamic packages, the Falcon gaining controversial protrusions from its front splitter.

== Teams and drivers ==
The following drivers and teams competed in the 1994 Australian Touring Car Championship:

Team (Entrant)	Car	No.	Driver	Rounds
Glenn Seton Racing (Peter Jackson Racing)	Ford Falcon (EB)	1	(Australia) Glenn Seton	All
Glenn Seton Racing (Peter Jackson Racing)	Ford Falcon (EB)	30	(Australia) Alan Jones	All
Gibson Motorsport (Winfield Racing)	Holden Commodore (VP)	2	(Australia) Mark Skaife	All
Gibson Motorsport (Winfield Racing)	Holden Commodore (VP)	6	(New Zealand) Jim Richards	All
Lansvale Racing Team (Lansvale Smash Repairs)	Holden Commodore (VP)	3	(Australia) Trevor Ashby	1, 4–6
Lansvale Racing Team (Lansvale Smash Repairs)	Holden Commodore (VP)	3	(Australia) Steve Reed	2, 7–8, 10
Wayne Gardner Racing (Coca-Cola Racing)	Holden Commodore (VP)	4	(Australia) Wayne Gardner	All
Wayne Gardner Racing (Coca-Cola Racing)	Holden Commodore (VP)	7	(Australia) Neil Crompton	All
Holden Racing Team (Holden Racing Team)	Holden Commodore (VP)	05	(Australia) Peter Brock	All
Holden Racing Team (Holden Racing Team)	Holden Commodore (VP)	015	(Australia) Tomas Mezera	All
Perkins Engineering (Castrol Perkins Racing)	Holden Commodore (VP)	11	(Australia) Larry Perkins	All
Ampol Max 3 Racing (Ampol Max 3 Racing)	Holden Commodore (VP)	12	(Australia) Bob Jones	All
Stuart McColl Ampol (Kartmania)	Holden Commodore (VP)	14	(Australia) Stuart McColl	2, 6, 8
Graham Blythman	Holden Commodore (VP)	16	(Australia) Graham Blythman	7, 9
Dick Johnson Racing (Shell F.A.I. Racing)	Ford Falcon (EB)	17	(Australia) Dick Johnson	All
Dick Johnson Racing (Shell F.A.I. Racing)	Ford Falcon (EB)	18	(Australia) John Bowe	All
Dick Johnson Racing (Shell F.A.I. Racing)	Ford Falcon (EB)	19	(Australia) Steven Johnson	10
Palmer Promotions (Palmer Promotions)	Holden Commodore (VP)	20	(Australia) Ian Palmer	5–7
LoGaMo Racing (Diet-Coke Racing) (Benson & Hedges Racing)	Holden Commodore (VP)	23	(Australia) Paul Morris	1–3, 5–10
LoGaMo Racing (Diet-Coke Racing) (Benson & Hedges Racing)	Holden Commodore (VP)	25	(Australia) Tony Longhurst	1–3, 5–10
Pinnacle Motorsport (Anthony Scott)	Holden Commodore (VP)	24	(Australia) Tony Scott	2, 5, 10
Pinnacle Motorsport (Anthony Scott)	Holden Commodore (VP)	24	(Australia) Greg Crick	3–4, 7–8
Don Watson (Don Watson Pty. Ltd.)	Holden Commodore (VP)	26	(Australia) Don Watson	6–10
Terry Finnigan	Holden Commodore (VP)	27	(Australia) Terry Finnigan	1, 7
Playscape Racing (Playscape Racing)	Ford Falcon (EB)	28	(Australia) Kevin Waldock	1, 4–5, 9–10
James Philip	Holden Commodore (VL) SS Group A SV	31	(Australia) James Philip	2
Pace Racing (Kevin Heffernan)	Holden Commodore (VL) SS Group A SV	32	(Australia) Kevin Heffernan	5, 10
Pro-Duct Racing	Holden Commodore (VP)	33	(Australia) Bob Pearson	1–2, 6–7
Ian Love	Holden Commodore (VP)	35	(Australia) Ian Love	9
Schembri Motorsport (Bettergrow)	Holden Commodore (VP)	36	(Australia) Neil Schembri	1, 5, 7, 10
Scotty Taylor Racing	Holden Commodore (VL) SS Group A SV	37	(Australia) Alan Taylor	3
Challenge Motorsport (Protech Computers)	Holden Commodore (VP)	39	(Australia) Chris Smerdon	1–2, 4, 7–8, 10
Garry Willmington Performance (Garry Willmington (NSW))	Ford Falcon (EB)	41	(Australia) Garry Willmington	6–7, 10
Glenn Mason	Holden Commodore (VL) SS Group A SV	42	(Australia) Glenn Mason	1, 7
Group Motorsport	Holden Commodore (VL) SS Group A SV	44	(Australia) George Ayoub	10
Daily Planet Racing (Metropolis City Promotions) (Daily Planet)	Holden Commodore (VP)	47	(Australia) John Trimbole	1–2, 4, 6–8, 10
Novocastrian Motorsport (Wayne Gary Russell) (Novocastrian Motorsport)	Holden Commodore (VL) SS Group A SV	62	(Australia) Wayne Russell	10
Barbagallo Motorsport	Holden Commodore (VP)	77	(Australia) Alf Barbagallo	9
Cadillac Productions	Holden Commodore (VL) SS Group A SV	79	(Australia) Mike Conway	1, 7, 10
Steven Ellery Racing (Steve Ellery)	Ford Sierra RS	88	(Australia) Steven Ellery	1–2

Movements

- Peter Brock moved from Advantage Racing to the Holden Racing Team with his Mobil sponsorship replacing Wayne Gardner. Brock's win in Round 7 at Sydney's Eastern Creek Raceway was the HRT's first ever ATCC round win and the first factory Holden win since Brock won round 6 of the 1986 ATCC at Surfers Paradise in a Holden Dealer Team Holden VK Commodore.
- LoGaMo Racing purchased a pair of Perkins Engineering built VP Commodores to replace its BMW M3s. It continued to race four cars with Tony Longhurst and Paul Morris also driving a pair of BMW 320is in the Australian Manufacturers' Championship.
- Wayne Gardner purchased the assets of Bob Forbes Racing to form Wayne Gardner Racing with Neil Crompton moving as part of the deal. The deal included major sponsorship from Coca-Cola.

Arrivals / returnees

- Pinnacle Motorsport entered the series purchasing Peter Brock's 1993 Advantage Racing VP Commodore with Greg Crick and Tony Scott sharing the driving.
- Dick Johnson's son Steven made his ATCC debut driving a third Dick Johnson Racing EB Falcon at the final round at Oran Park.

Departures

- With LoGaMo Racing scaling back to two cars, John Blanchard and Geoff Full did not return

== Race calendar ==
The 1994 Australian Touring Car Championship was contested over 10 rounds. 1994 saw the last ATCC race at the tight, 1.94 km (1.20 mi) Amaroo Park circuit in Sydney.

Round	Race title	Circuit	City/Town	Suburb	State/Territory	Date/s	Winner	Team	Report
1	(New South Wales) Amaroo	Amaroo Park	Sydney	Annangrove	New South Wales	25–27 Feb	Mark Skaife	Gibson Motorsport	Report
2	(Victoria (state)) Sandown	Sandown International Raceway	Melbourne	Springvale	Victoria	4–6 Mar	Mark Skaife	Gibson Motorsport	Report
3	(Tasmania) Launceston	Symmons Plains Raceway	Launceston		Tasmania	12–14 Mar	Mark Skaife	Gibson Motorsport	Report
4	(Victoria (state)) Phillip Island	Phillip Island Grand Prix Circuit	Phillip Island		Victoria	8–10 Apr	Glenn Seton	Glenn Seton Racing	Report
5	(Queensland) Lakeside	Lakeside International Raceway	Brisbane		Queensland	22–24 Apr	Larry Perkins	Perkins Engineering	Report
6	(Victoria (state)) Winton	Winton Motor Raceway	Winton	Benalla	Victoria	13–15 May	Glenn Seton	Glenn Seton Racing	Report
7	(New South Wales) Eastern Creek	Eastern Creek Raceway	Sydney	Eastern Creek	New South Wales	3–5 Jun	Peter Brock	Holden Racing Team	Report
8	(South Australia) Mallala	Mallala Motor Sport Park	Mallala		South Australia	24–26 Jun	Mark Skaife	Gibson Motorsport	Report
9	(Western Australia) Perth	Barbagallo Raceway	Perth		Western Australia	1–3 Jul	Alan Jones	Glenn Seton Racing	Report
10	(New South Wales) Oran Park	Oran Park Raceway	Sydney	Narellan	New South Wales	22–24 Jul	Glenn Seton	Glenn Seton Racing	Report

Each round comprised Qualifying, the Peter Jackson Dash, which was contested by the six fastest drivers from Qualifying, and two feature races.

== Points system ==
=== Rounds 1 to 4 ===
- Three points were awarded to the fastest driver in Qualifying at each round
- Points were awarded on a 3–2–1 basis for the first three places in the Peter Jackson Dash at each round
- Points were awarded on a 20–16–14–12–10–8–6–4–2–1 basis for the first ten places in each of the two races at each round

=== Rounds 5 to 10 ===
- No points were awarded to the fastest driver in Qualifying at each round
- Points were awarded on a 3–2–1 basis for the first three places in the Peter Jackson Dash at each round
- One bonus point was awarded for each position gained during the Peter Jackson Dash, but only to a driver finishing third or higher in the Dash
- Points were awarded on a 20–16–14–12–10–8–6–4–2–1 basis for the first ten places in each of the two races at each round

== Championship standings ==
Pos	Driver	Car	Ama	San	Sym	Phi	Lak	Win	Eas	Mal	Bar	Ora	Pts
1	Mark Skaife	Holden VP Commodore	46	40	43	31	24	30	30	36	5	(Ret)	285
2	Glenn Seton	Ford EB Falcon	32	12	28	40	7	40	10	12	4	43	228
3	Peter Brock	Holden VP Commodore	24	23	26	31	15	6	40	20	5	32	222
4	Larry Perkins	Holden VP Commodore	6	22	13	(Ret)	36	18	15	24	32	11	177
5	Alan Jones	Ford EB Falcon	1	20	6	18	4	33	22	25	34	14	177
6	Jim Richards	Holden VP Commodore	14	22	12	10	30	6	8	34	20	1	157
7	John Bowe	Ford EB Falcon	16	13	17	16	8	18	15	5	24	24	156
8	Dick Johnson	Ford EB Falcon	16	1	3	16	20	1	14	10	12	24	117
9	Tomas Mezera	Holden VP Commodore	16	21	8	11	(Ret)	4	22	8	10	11	111
10	Neil Crompton	Holden VP Commodore	0	0	6	12	4	24	0	2	11	18	77
11	Tony Longhurst	Holden VP Commodore	9	4	20		0	8	1	8	24	0	74
12	Wayne Gardner	Holden VP Commodore	1	12	4	10	8	2	15	4	6	10	72
13	Paul Morris	Holden VP Commodore	14	5	9		14	2	4	2	8	6	64
14	Trevor Ashby	Holden VP Commodore	0			0	16	0					16
15	Tony Scott	Holden VP Commodore		0			6					0	6
16	Bob Jones	Holden VP Commodore	0	0	0	0	1	0	0	1	0	0	2
17	Greg Crick	Holden VP Commodore			0	0			(Ret)	1			1
Pos	Driver	Car	Ama	San	Sym	Phi	Lak	Win	Eas	Mal	Bar	Ora	Pts

Colour	Result
Gold	Winner
Silver	Second place
Bronze	Third place
Green	Points classification
Blue	Non-points classification
Blue	Non-classified finish (NC)
Purple	Retired, not classified (Ret)
Red	Did not qualify (DNQ)
Red	Did not pre-qualify (DNPQ)
Black	Disqualified (DSQ)
White	Did not start (DNS)
White	Withdrew (WD)
White	Race cancelled (C)
Blank	Did not practice (DNP)
Blank	Did not arrive (DNA)
Blank	Excluded (EX)

=== Privateers Cup ===
The Privateers Cup was won by Bob Jones.

== See also ==
- 1994 Australian Touring Car season
