= 2000 Ozemail Queensland 500 =

Supercar race

Event Information
- Round 11 of 13 in the 2000 Shell Championship Series
- Date: 8–10 September 2000
- Location: Ipswich, Queensland
- Venue: Queensland Raceway
- Weather: Fine

Results
Race 1
| Distance | 161 laps | 500 km |
| Pole position | Garth Tander; Garry Rogers Motorsport | 1:10.3858 |
| Winner | Craig Lowndes; Mark Skaife; Holden Racing Team | 3:25:34.3893 |
Round Results
| First | Craig Lowndes Mark Skaife; Holden Racing Team | 160 pts |
| Second | Garth Tander Jason Bargwanna; Garry Rogers Motorsport | 144 pts |
| Third | Steven Richards Greg Murphy; Gibson Motorsport | 136 pts |

The 2000 Ozemail Queensland 500 was an endurance race for V8 Supercars. It was held at the Queensland Raceway, near Ipswich, in Queensland, Australia on 10 September 2000. The race was staged over 161 laps of the 3.12 kilometre circuit, a total distance of 502 kilometres. It was Round 11 of the 2000 Shell Championship Series and was the second Queensland 500.

== Top ten shootout ==
| Pos | No | Team | Driver | Car | Time |
|---|---|---|---|---|---|
| Pole | 34 | Garry Rogers Motorsport | (Australia) Garth Tander | Holden VT Commodore | 1:10.3858 |
| 2 | 11 | Castrol Perkins Race Team | (Australia) Russell Ingall | Holden VT Commodore | 1:10.4503 |
| 3 | 9 | Caltex Havoline Race Team | (Australia) David Besnard | Ford AU Falcon | 1:10.5292 |
| 4 | 18 | Shell Helix Racing | (New Zealand) Paul Radisich | Ford AU Falcon | 1:10.6578 |
| 5 | 1 | Holden Racing Team | (Australia) Craig Lowndes | Holden VT Commodore | 1:10.7237 |
| 6 | 600 | Cat Racing | (Australia) John Bowe | Ford AU Falcon | 1:10.8209 |
| 7 | 10 | Mitre 10 Ford Racing | (Australia) Mark Larkham | Ford AU Falcon | 1:10.8225 |
| 8 | 7 | Gibson Motorsport | (New Zealand) Greg Murphy | Holden VT Commodore | 1:11.1283 |
| 9 | 5 | Ford Tickford Racing | (Australia) Glenn Seton | Ford AU Falcon | 1:11.7440 |
| 10 | 43 | K&J Thermal Products Racing | (Australia) Greg Crick | Ford AU Falcon | 1:11.8959 |

== Results ==
Results as follows:

| Pos | No | Team | Drivers | Car | Laps | Qual Pos | Shootout Pos | Series Points |
|---|---|---|---|---|---|---|---|---|
| 1 | 1 | Holden Racing Team | (Australia) Craig Lowndes (Australia) Mark Skaife | Holden VT Commodore | 161 | 8 | 5 | 160 |
| 2 | 34 | Garry Rogers Motorsport | (Australia) Garth Tander (Australia) Jason Bargwanna | Holden VT Commodore | 161 | 2 | 1 | 144 |
| 3 | 7 | Gibson Motorsport | (New Zealand) Steven Richards (New Zealand) Greg Murphy | Holden VT Commodore | 161 | 5 | 8 | 136 |
| 4 | 11 | Castrol Perkins Race Team | (Australia) Russell Ingall (Australia) Larry Perkins | Holden VT Commodore | 161 | 1 | 2 | 128 |
| 5 | 600 | Cat Racing | (Australia) John Bowe (New Zealand) Jim Richards | Ford AU Falcon | 161 | 4 | 6 | 120 |
| 6 | 18 | Shell Helix Racing | (New Zealand) Paul Radisich (Australia) Cameron McLean | Ford AU Falcon | 161 | 3 | 4 | 112 |
| 7 | 5 | Ford Tickford Racing | (Australia) Glenn Seton (Australia) Neil Crompton | Ford AU Falcon | 161 | 10 | 9 | 104 |
| 8 | 9 | Caltex Havoline Race Team | (Australia) Tony Longhurst (Australia) David Besnard | Ford AU Falcon | 161 | 7 | 3 | 96 |
| 9 | 35 | Garry Rogers Motorsport | (Australia) Greg Ritter (Australia) Tim Leahey | Holden VT Commodore | 160 | 18 | | 88 |
| 10 | 4 | Pirtek Racing | (New Zealand) Craig Baird (New Zealand) Simon Wills | Ford AU Falcon | 160 | 12 | | 80 |
| 11 | 76 | Challenge Recruitment Racing | (Australia) Matthew White (Australia) Terry Wyhoon | Holden VS Commodore | 160 | 20 | | 72 |
| 12 | 46 | Team Asia Online | (New Zealand) John Faulkner (Australia) Adam Macrow | Holden VT Commodore | 160 | 19 | | 64 |
| 13 | 31 | Supercheap Auto Racing | (Australia) Steven Ellery (Australia) Paul Stokell | Ford AU Falcon | 160 | 13 | | 56 |
| 14 | 28 | Gibson Motorsport | (Australia) Rodney Forbes (United Kingdom) John Cleland | Holden VT Commodore | 159 | 16 | | 48 |
| 15 | 55 | Autopro Racing | (Australia) Cameron McConville (Australia) Rod Nash | Holden VT Commodore | 157 | 25 | | 40 |
| 16 | 23 | Lansvale Smash Repairs Racing | (Australia) Geoff Full (Australia) Phillip Scifleet | Holden VS Commodore | 157 | 34 | | 32 |
| 17 | 26 | Team Gatorade Racing | (Australia) Peter Doulman (Australia) John Cotter | Holden VT Commodore | 157 | 26 | | 24 |
| 18 | 22 | Colorscan Motorsport | (Australia) Rick Bates (Australia) Brett Peters | Ford AU Falcon | 156 | 29 | | 16 |
| 19 | 20 | Eastern Creek Kart Racing | (Australia) Garry Holt (Australia) Garry Willmington | Ford EL Falcon | 154 | 37 | | 8 |
| 20 | 14 | IMS Imrie Motorsport | (Australia) Daniel Miller (Australia) Anthony Robson | Holden VT Commodore | 153 | 38 | | 4 |
| 21 | 24 | Romano Racing | (Australia) Paul Romano (Australia) James Brock | Holden VS Commodore | 153 | 28 | | |
| 22 | 99 | Motorsport Engineering Racing | (Australia) Derek Van Zelm (Australia) Christian D'Agostin | Holden VT Commodore | 144 | 33 | | |
| 23 | 97 | Graphic Skills Racing | (Australia) Wayne Wakefield (Australia) Ryan McLeod | Holden VS Commodore | 135 | 35 | | |
| 24 | 50 | Clive Wiseman Racing | (Australia) Mick Donaher (Australia) Tyler Mecklem | Holden VT Commodore | 130 | 21 | | |
| DNF | 43 | K&J Thermal Products Racing | (Australia) Paul Weel (Australia) Greg Crick | Ford AU Falcon | 150 | 9 | 10 | |
| DNF | 2 | Holden Racing Team | (Australia) Nathan Pretty (Australia) Todd Kelly | Holden VT Commodore | 142 | 14 | | |
| DNF | 75 | Toll Racing | (Australia) Anthony Tratt (Australia) Alan Jones | Ford AU Falcon | 115 | 31 | | |
| DNF | 12 | Gibson Motorsport | (Australia) Terry Finnigan (Australia) Darren Hossack | Holden VT Commodore | 77 | 24 | | |
| DNF | 8 | Castrol Perkins Race Team | (Australia) Luke Youlden (Singapore) Christian Murchison | Holden VT Commodore | 68 | 27 | | |
| DNF | 17 | Shell Helix Racing | (Australia) Steven Johnson (Australia) Dick Johnson | Ford AU Falcon | 67 | 11 | | |
| DNF | 10 | Mitre 10 Ford Racing | (Australia) Mark Larkham (Australia) Geoff Brabham | Ford AU Falcon | 49 | 6 | 7 | |
| DNF | 6 | Ford Tickford Racing | (Australia) Dean Canto (Australia) Neal Bates | Ford AU Falcon | 49 | 17 | | |
| DNF | 3 | Lansvale Smash Repairs Racing | (Australia) Steve Reed (Australia) Trevor Ashby | Holden VS Commodore | 44 | 32 | | |
| DNF | 61 | 3M Racing | (Australia) Ross Halliday (Australia) Adam Wallis | Ford EL Falcon | 40 | 36 | | |
| DNF | 21 | Ozemail Internet Racing | (Australia) Brad Jones (Australia) Tomas Mezera | Ford AU Falcon | 35 | 22 | | |
| DNF | 16 | Pepsi-Cola Racing | (Australia) Dugal McDougall (Australia) Andrew Miedecke | Holden VT Commodore | 28 | 23 | | |
| DNF | 29 | Big Kev Racing / Team Nemo | (Australia) Paul Morris (United States) Kevin Schwantz | Holden VT Commodore | 12 | 15 | | |
| DNF | 87 | Oneworld Hotel & Sports Centre | (Australia) Rod Salmon (Australia) Damien White | Ford AU Falcon | 1 | 30 | | |

== Statistics ==
- Provisional Pole Position - #11 Russell Ingall - 1:10.1840
- Pole Position - #34 Garth Tander - 1:10.3858
- Fastest Lap - #5 Glenn Seton - 1:11.4455
- Average Speed - 146.61 km/h
