= 1993 Australian Touring Car Championship =

Motor racing competition

Seasons
- ← 1992 1994 →

The 1993 Australian Touring Car Championship was a CAMS sanctioned Australian motor racing title for Group 3A Touring Cars. The championship, which was the 34th Australian Touring Car Championship, was contested over a nine-round series which began on 28 February 1993 at Amaroo Park and ended on 8 August at Oran Park Raceway. Promoted as the Shell Australian Touring Car Championship, it was won by Glenn Seton, driving a Ford EB Falcon, with teammate Alan Jones completing a one-two championship result for Glenn Seton Racing. It was Seton's first championship victory and the first major victory for the team he had started in 1989.

1993 marked the first year in which the championship was contested by the new Australian Group 3A Touring Car category which incorporated:

- 5.0 Litre Touring Cars (later to be known as V8 Supercars)
- 2.0 Litre Class II Touring Cars (later to be known as Super Touring Cars)
- Normally aspirated, two wheel drive cars complying with the 1992 CAMS Group 3A regulations (commonly known as Group A cars)

== Television coverage ==
Channel Seven broadcast the championship with the commentary team including Mike Raymond, Gary Wilkinson, Mark Oastler, Doug Mulray and Andy Raymond. Regular commentator Neil Crompton was absent as he was contesting the full series as a competitor for the first time.

== Teams and drivers ==
The following drivers and teams competed in the 1993 Australian Touring Car Championship.

Team	Car	No	Driver
Winfield Racing Team	Holden VP Commodore	1	(Australia) Mark Skaife
Winfield Racing Team	Holden VP Commodore	2	(New Zealand) Jim Richards
Lansvale Racing Team	Holden VP Commodore	3	(Australia) Trevor Ashby (Australia) Steve Reed
GIO Racing	Holden VP Commodore	4	(Australia) Mark Gibbs
GIO Racing	Holden VP Commodore	7	(Australia) Neil Crompton
Mobil 1 Racing	Holden VP Commodore	05	(Australia) Peter Brock
Caltex CXT Racing	Toyota Corolla FX-GT AE90; Toyota Corolla Seca AE93	6	(Australia) John Smith
Caltex CXT Racing	Toyota Corolla Seca AE93	8	(Australia) Colin Bond
Castrol Perkins Racing	Holden VL Commodore SS Group A SV; Holden VP Commodore	11	(Australia) Larry Perkins
Ampol Max 3 Racing	Holden VP Commodore	12	(Australia) Bob Jones
Bob Holden Motors	Toyota Sprinter AE86	13	(Australia) Bob Holden
Holden Racing Team	Holden VP Commodore	15	(Australia) Tomas Mezera
Holden Racing Team	Holden VP Commodore	16	(Australia) Wayne Gardner
Shell Racing	Ford EB Falcon	17	(Australia) Dick Johnson
Shell Racing	Ford EB Falcon	18	(Australia) John Bowe
LoGaMo Racing	BMW E30 M3 Evolution	20	(Australia) John Blanchard
LoGaMo Racing	BMW E30 M3 Evolution	23	(Australia) Paul Morris
LoGaMo Racing	BMW E30 M3 Evolution	24	(Australia) Geoff Full
LoGaMo Racing	BMW E30 M3 Evolution	25	(Australia) Tony Longhurst
Wayne Douglass Motorsport	Holden VL Commodore SS Group A SV	22	(Australia) Mark Potter (Australia) Brett Youlden
John English	Holden VL Commodore SS Group A SV	24	(Australia) John English
Don Watson	Holden VL Commodore SS Group A SV	26	(Australia) Don Watson
Terry Finnigan	Holden VN Commodore SS Group A SV; Holden VP Commodore	27	(Australia) Terry Finnigan
Peter Jackson Racing	Ford EB Falcon	30	(Australia) Glenn Seton
Peter Jackson Racing	Ford EB Falcon	35	(Australia) Alan Jones
Phil Johnson	Holden VL Commodore SS Group A SV	31	(Australia) Phil Johnson
Pro-Duct Racing	Holden VP Commodore	33	(Australia) Bob Pearson
Schembri Motorsport	Holden VL Commodore SS Group A SV	36	(Australia) Neil Schembri
Challenge Motorsport	Holden VL Commodore SS Group A SV	39	(Australia) Chris Smerdon
Ian Love	Holden VP Commodore	40	(Australia) Ian Love
Daily Planet Racing	Holden VL Commodore SS Group A SV	41	(Australia) John Trimbole
Glenn Mason	Holden VL Commodore SS Group A SV	42	(Australia) Glenn Mason
Stuart McColl	Holden VL Commodore SS Group A SV	44	(Australia) Stuart McColl
Laurie Donaher	Holden VL Commodore SS Group A SV	46	(Australia) Laurie Donaher
Mike Twigden	Holden VL Commodore SS Group A SV	48	(Australia) Mike Twigden
Pace Racing	Holden VL Commodore SS Group A SV	50	(Australia) Kevin Heffernan
M3 Motorsport	BMW E30 M3 2.0	52	(Australia) John Cotter
M3 Motorsport	BMW E30 M3 2.0	53	(Australia) Peter Doulman
Brad Stratton	Toyota Corolla AE82	72	(Australia) Brad Stratton
Frank Binding	Toyota Corolla AE82	75	(Australia) Frank Binding
Barbagallo Motorsport	Holden VP Commodore	77	(Australia) Alf Barbagallo
Easton Motorsport	Toyota Sprinter AE86	77	(Australia) Gregg Easton
Cadillac Productions	Toyota Sprinter AE86	79	(Australia) Mike Conway
Motorsport Developments	Toyota Sprinter AE86	88	(Australia) Malcolm Rea (Australia) Ken Talbert

== Race calendar ==
The championship was contested over a nine-round series. Each round consisted of a "Peter Jackson Dash" for the top six cars from Qualifying, a Heat for the 2.0 Litre Class, a Heat for the 5.0 Litre Class and a combined Final. The two Class Heats were run separately at Round 1 but were combined from Round 2 onwards.

Rd.	Circuit	Location / state	Date	Winner	Car	Team
1	Amaroo Park	Sydney, New South Wales	26–28 Feb	John Bowe	Ford EB Falcon	Dick Johnson Racing
2	Symmons Plains Raceway	Launceston, Tasmania	12–14 Mar	Alan Jones	Ford EB Falcon	Glenn Seton Racing
3	Phillip Island Grand Prix Circuit	Phillip Island, Victoria	2–4 Apr	Glenn Seton	Ford EB Falcon	Glenn Seton Racing
4	Lakeside International Raceway	Brisbane, Queensland	16–18 Apr	Alan Jones	Ford EB Falcon	Glenn Seton Racing
5	Winton Motor Raceway	Benalla, Victoria	14–16 May	Glenn Seton	Ford EB Falcon	Glenn Seton Racing
6	Eastern Creek Raceway	Sydney, New South Wales	4–6 Jun	Glenn Seton	Ford EB Falcon	Glenn Seton Racing
7	Mallala Motor Sport Park	Mallala, South Australia	2–4 Jul	Glenn Seton	Ford EB Falcon	Glenn Seton Racing
8	Barbagallo Raceway	Perth, Western Australia	9–11 Jul	Jim Richards	Holden VP Commodore	Gibson Motorsport
9	Oran Park Raceway	Sydney, New South Wales	6–8 Aug	Jim Richards	Holden VP Commodore	Gibson Motorsport

== Points system ==
Championship points were awarded at each round on the following basis:

- 3 to the driver recording fastest time in Qualifying
- 3–2–1 to the first three finishers in the Peter Jackson Dash
- 9–6–4–3–2–1 to the first six finishers in each Class in the Heat
- 20–16–14–12–10–8–6–4–2–1 to the first ten outright finishers in the Final

== Championship standings ==
Pos.	Driver	Car	Ama	Sym	Phi	Lak	Win	Eas	Mal	Bar	Ora	Pts
1	Glenn Seton	Ford EB Falcon	20	7	34	17	34	33	30	1	15	191
2	Alan Jones	Ford EB Falcon	8	30	19	29	10	20	10	8	14	148
3	John Bowe	Ford EB Falcon	23	14	20	19	7	23	16	3	15	140
4	Jim Richards	Holden VP Commodore	12	10	2	0	16	1	4	29	25	99
5	Dick Johnson	Ford EB Falcon	11	15	19	26	11	0	3	6	2	93
6	Mark Skaife	Holden VP Commodore	21	10	0	0	4	12	28	12	Ret	87
7	Tomas Mezera	Holden VP Commodore	8	22	11	Ret	DNS	6	18	2	18	85
8	Peter Brock	Holden VP Commodore	Ret	6	5	12	15	4	8	10	2	82
9	Tony Longhurst	BMW E30 M3 Evolution	4	2	8	11	22	4	2	16	0	69
10	Peter Doulman	BMW E30 M3 2.0	9	9	9	4	9	0	6	4	9	59
11	John Smith	Toyota Corolla FX-GT AE90; Toyota Corolla Seca AE93	6	6	6	6	6	0	9	9	Ret	48
12	Larry Perkins	Holden VL Commodore SS Group A SV; Holden VP Commodore	Ret	1	2	2	3	9	7	13	1	38
13	Neil Crompton	Holden VP Commodore	1	6	Ret	1	2	0	0	18	9	37
14	Wayne Gardner	Holden VP Commodore	11	3	0	4	0	3	Ret	6	6	33
15	Colin Bond	Toyota Corolla Seca AE93	Ret	4	4	9	Ret	9	0	6	DNS	32
16	Paul Morris	BMW E30 M3 Evolution	2	1	6	6	3	12	1	Ret	0	31
17	Brad Stratton	Toyota Corolla AE82	2		2	3	4	2	3		3	19
18	John Cotter	BMW E30 M3 2.0	4					6			6	16
19	Mike Conway	Toyota Sprinter AE86	3		3		3	4			2	15
20	Frank Binding	Toyota Corolla AE82	1			Ret		3			4	8
20	Bob Holden	Toyota Sprinter AE86					2	1	4		1	8
22	Trevor Ashby	Holden VP Commodore	6					0				6
23	Gregg Easton	Toyota Sprinter AE86				2						2
23	Ian Love	Holden VP Commodore								2		2
25	John Blanchard	BMW E30 M3 Evolution	0	0	1	0	Ret	0	0	Ret		1
25	Ken Talbert	Toyota Sprinter AE86	0				1					1
25	Alf Barbagallo	Holden VP Commodore								1		1
Pos.	Driver	Car	Ama	Sym	Phi	Lak	Win	Eas	Mal	Bar	Ora	Pts

Colour	Result
Gold	Winner
Silver	Second place
Bronze	Third place
Green	Points classification
Blue	Non-points classification
Blue	Non-classified finish (NC)
Purple	Retired, not classified (Ret)
Red	Did not qualify (DNQ)
Red	Did not pre-qualify (DNPQ)
Black	Disqualified (DSQ)
White	Did not start (DNS)
White	Withdrew (WD)
White	Race cancelled (C)
Blank	Did not practice (DNP)
Blank	Did not arrive (DNA)
Blank	Excluded (EX)

=== Peter Jackson Dash ===
The Peter Jackson Dash series award was won jointly by Mark Skaife and Glenn Seton.

=== Australian 2.0 Litre Touring Car Championship ===
The 1993 Australian 2.0 Litre Touring Car Championship, which was contested concurrently with the 1993 Australian Touring Car Championship, was won by Peter Doulman driving a BMW M3.

== See also ==
- 1993 Australian Touring Car season
