= Tony Longhurst =

Australian racing driver (born 1957)

- Nationality: Australian
- Born: Anthony Lawrence Longhurst; 1 October 1957 (age 69) Sydney

ATCC / V8 Supercar
- Years active: 1985–2007
- Teams: JPS Team BMW; Tony Longhurst Racing; Longhurst Racing; Stone Brothers Racing; Rod Nash Racing; Holden Racing Team; Perkins Engineering; Team Dynamik
- Starts: 191
- Wins: 5
- Best finish: 3rd in 1991 & 1992

Previous series
- 1983 1986–91 1994: Alfasud Series; AMSCAR; Australian Super Touring

Championship titles
- 1986 1987 1988 1989 1990 1991 1994 2001 2009: AMSCAR; AMSCAR; Bathurst 1000; AMSCAR; AMSCAR; AMSCAR; Australian Super Touring; Bathurst 1000; Bathurst 12 Hour

Anthony Lawrence Longhurst (born 1 October 1957 in Sydney) is an Australian racing driver and former Australian Champion water skier. He is most noted for his career in the Australian Touring Car Championship and V8 Supercar series. Longhurst is a two-time winner of the Bathurst 1000, winning the event in 1988 with Tomas Mezera and in 2001 with Mark Skaife, and is one of only five drivers to win Bathurst in both a Ford and a Holden (the others being Craig Lowndes, Steven Richards, Jamie Whincup and Chaz Mostert).

Longhurst also had a long association with BMW, racing internationally in the 1987 World Touring Car Championship and 1993 FIA Touring Car Challenge, and winning the 1985 Sandown 500 and the 1994 Australian Super Touring Championship for the marque.

== Career ==
=== JPS Team BMW ===
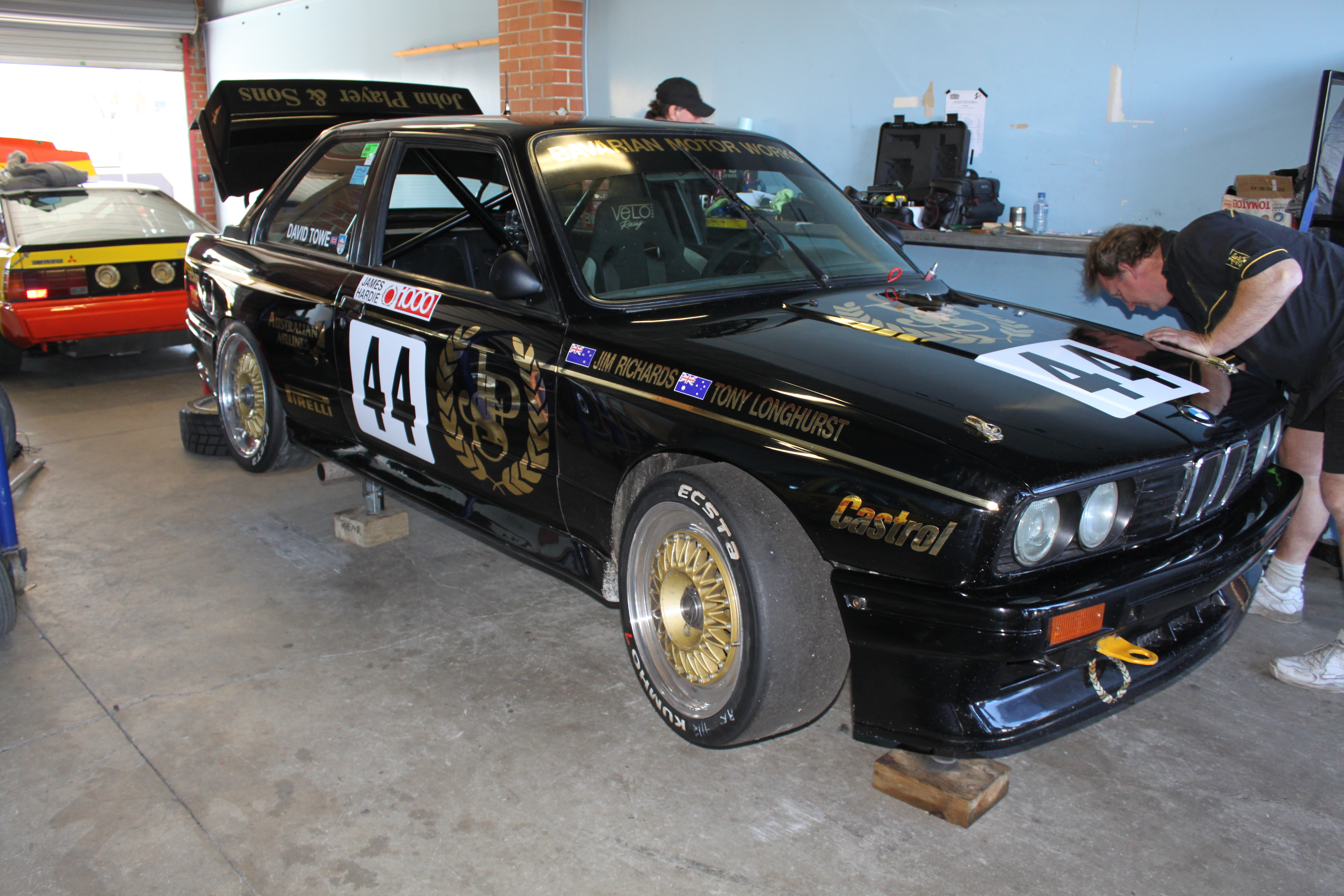
JPS Team BMW M3 of Jim Richards and Tony Longhurst which finished 4th outright and first in class at the 1987 James Hardie 1000.

After a self-entered Bathurst 1000 debut in 1983 with Mike Burgmann, Longhurst joined Frank Gardner's JPS Team BMW team for the 1984 Australian Endurance Championship. Co-driving with Jim Richards, Longhurst continued with the team in 1985, winning the 1985 Sandown 500 in a one-two finish for the team. Longhurst also entered three solo rounds of the 1985 Australian Touring Car Championship, finishing third at the Amaroo Park Raceway round on only his second appearance. Longhurst entered the entire 1986 Australian Touring Car Championship, again finishing on the podium at Amaroo, and finishing fifth in the championship. In 1987, Longhurst would finish fourth in the championship with four round podiums. Frank Gardner then shut his team at the end of the 1987 season.

=== LoGaMo Racing ===
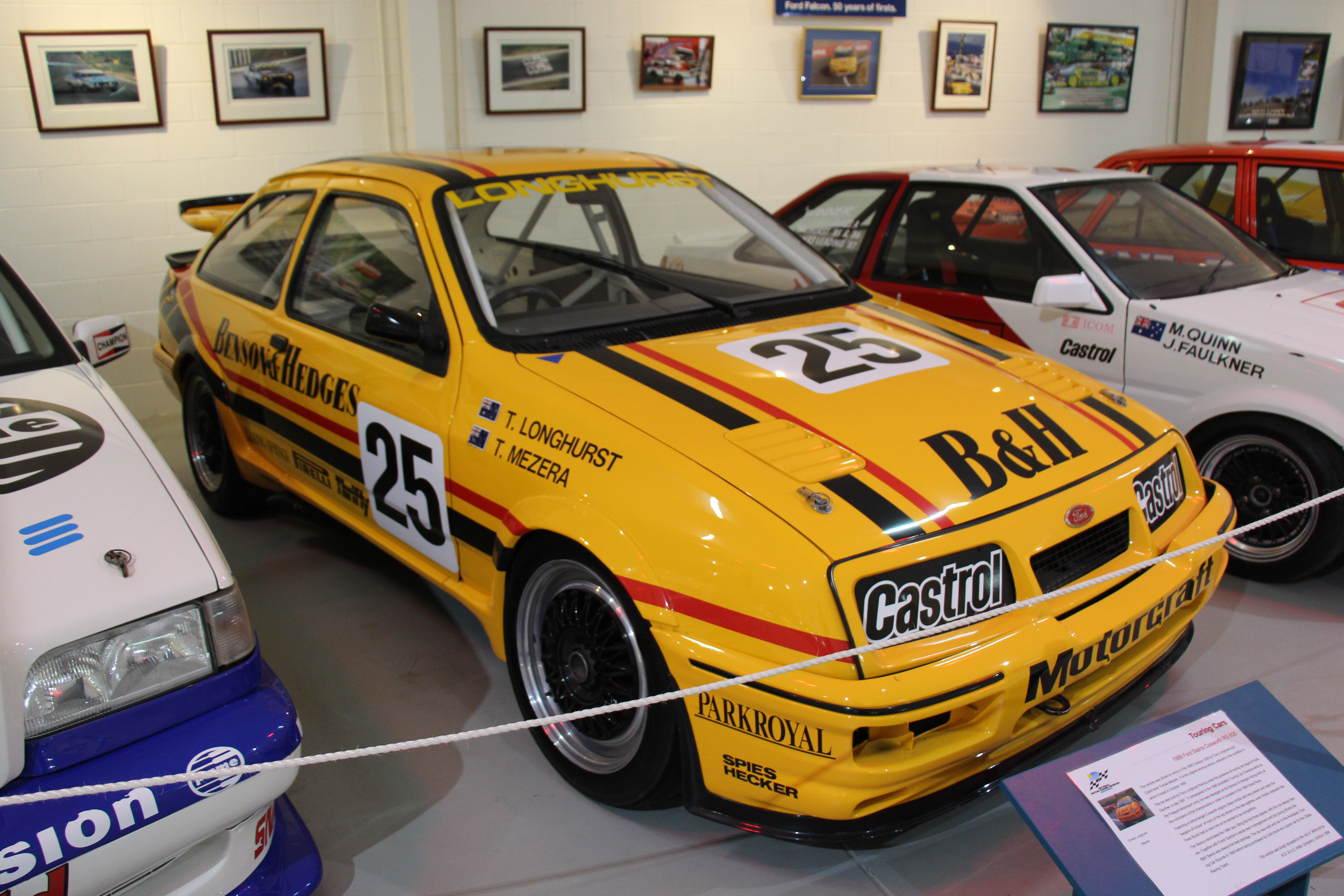
The Ford Sierra RS500 Longhurst drove to win 1988 Bathurst 1000

With the demise of JPS Team BMW, Longhurst started his own touring car team in 1988, which based itself on the Gold Coast behind the Longhurst family owned Dreamworld. Both Gardner and Terry Morris would take a shareholding in the team which became known as LoGaMo Racing. For sponsorship reasons the team was known by various names during its time including Freeport Motorsport and Benson & Hedges Racing.

Initially running the powerful Ford Sierra RS500 from 1988 to 1990, Longhurst won the 1988 Bathurst 1000 driving with Tomas Mezera. The car (pictured right) remains on display at the National Motor Racing Museum, which is located on the outside of the final turn of the famous Mount Panorama Circuit. Longhurst also won his first championship round in 1988 at Amaroo. The team then used the evolution model BMW M3 from 1991 to 1993, and Longhurst finished a career-best third in both 1991 and 1992. In this period, Longhurst saw particular success at Lakeside International Raceway, winning three rounds at the circuit in 1988, 1991 and 1992.

From 1993, the ATCC moved to the Group 3A Touring Car formula based on Ford Falcons and Holden Commodores. LoGaMo continued to run the BMW M3 in 1993 before running a Holden VP Commodore supplied by Perkins Engineering in 1994. In 1994 Longhurst won the first race of the 1994 Barbagallo ATCC round, his final solo race victory in the championship.

Outside the ATCC, Longhurst was the only driver to have won five of the now defunct AMSCAR series run at Sydney's Amaroo Park circuit. He won the series in 1986 (BMW 325i), 1987 (BMW M3), 1989 and 1990 (Ford Sierra RS500) and 1991 (BMW M3 Evolution). Longhurst also saw success in the New Zealand endurance events held for Group A regulations. In 1992 he won the Wellington 500 in the team's BMW M3 and came 3rd in the 1989 event. He also finished third in 1989 and 2nd in 1986 in the Pukekohe 500 event which was held in conjunction with the Wellington event.

=== Longhurst Racing ===
In 1995, Longhurst sold out to fellow shareholders Gardner and Morris (who wanted to focus on the Australian Super Touring Championship) and formed Longhurst Racing to compete in the Australian Touring Car Championship with a Ford EF Falcon backed by Castrol. The team's highlight was a podium at the 1996 Bathurst 1000 with Longhurst and Steven Ellery. Despite this, the team experienced limited success and Longhurst sold the team at the end of the 1999 season.

=== Contracted driver ===
For 2000, Longhurst was hired to drive for Stone Brothers Racing. Longhurst came close to winning the 2000 Bathurst 1000 with David Besnard, despite making the most pitstops of anyone in the race, until an incident scuppered their chances while leading with ten laps to go. In 2001, Longhurst competed with Rod Nash Racing during the single-driver events before being drafted into the Holden Racing Team for the endurance races. Driving with Mark Skaife, Longhurst won the 2001 Bathurst 1000. 2002 was Longhurst's last full-time season, driving for Briggs Motor Sport.

In 2003, Longhurst only entered the endurance races, pairing with Jim Richards as he had done in the 1980s. He would sign for Perkins Engineering in 2004, but did not see out the full season. In 2005, Longhurst bought the license for Team Dynamik's second car, running the No. 45 car for Max Wilson under WOW Sight & Sound sponsorship. Following Simon Wills's rollover at the Sandown 500, Longhurst purchased the remaining license from Team Dynamik and replaced Wills as Wilson's co-driver for the following round at Bathurst. He announced his retirement from competitive racing after the 2005 Bathurst 1000, where he and Brazilian co-driver Max Wilson failed to finish the race.

Longhurst also made an appearance at the Targa Tasmania in 2005 and 2006, finishing fourth overall in the latter.

=== Retirement and comebacks ===
Despite his retirement announcement, Longhurst made two subsequent returns to the V8 Supercar Championship Series. In 2006, he was co-driver for Steve Owen in the Rod Nash Racing AutoBarn Commodore. The pair put in solid drives finishing 12th at Sandown and 7th at Bathurst. Longhurst's final drive came at the 2007 Sandown 500 where he paired with Glenn Seton following a series of last minute driver swaps in the Holden Racing Team following Mark Skaife having surgery to remove his appendix.

In 2009, Longhurst added a Bathurst 12 Hour victory, co-driving with Rod Salmon and Damien White. By winning the 12 Hour, Longhurst joined Allan Grice, Gregg Hansford, Dick Johnson and John Bowe as the only winners of both the Bathurst 1000 and Bathurst 12 Hour races at the time of his achievement. In 2016, Longhurst returned to competition making an appearance at the Sydney Motorsport Park round of the Australian GT Championship in a MARC Ford Focus and at the Silverstone Classic driving his 1994 Australian Manufacturers' Championship winning BMW 318i Super Touring car.

Longhurst returned to Bathurst for the first time since winning the 2009 WPS Bathurst 12 Hour when he contested the 2017 Liqui Moly Bathurst 12 Hour driving a BMW M6 GT3 for BMW Team SRM alongside Timo Glock, Mark Skaife and Russell Ingall. The entry did not finish. Longhurst again entered the 2018 Liqui Moly Bathurst 12 Hour in a GT4 BMW and won his class with Aaron Seton and Matthew Brabham. After this result, Longhurst again called time on his career.

== Other activities ==
Longhurst continues to live on the Gold Coast in Queensland and owns and manages the Boat Works facility at Coomera. Before entering motorsport, Longhurst was successful in water skiing, holding the Australian speed record.

== Career results ==
Sourced from Driver Database

Season	Series	Position	Car	Team
1983	Australian Endurance Championship	65th	Chevrolet Camaro Z28	Mike Burgmann
1984	Alfasud Series	**1st**	Alfa Romeo Alfasud	Longhurst Racing
1984	Australian Endurance Championship	NC	BMW 635 CSi	JPS Team BMW
1984	World Endurance Championship	NC	BMW 320i	JPS Team BMW
1985	Australian Touring Car Championship	16th	BMW 323i	JPS Team BMW
1985	AMSCAR Series	**2nd**	BMW 323i	JPS Team BMW
1985	Australian Endurance Championship	**2nd**	BMW 323i BMW 635 CSi	JPS Team BMW
1986	AMSCAR Series	**1st**	BMW 325i	JPS Team BMW
1986	Australian Touring Car Championship	5th	BMW 325i	JPS Team BMW
1986	Australian Endurance Championship	**3rd**	BMW 325i BMW 635 CSi	JPS Team BMW
1987	AMSCAR Series	**1st**	BMW M3	JPS Team BMW
1987	Australian Touring Car Championship	4th	BMW M3	JPS Team BMW
1987	World Touring Car Championship	42nd	BMW M3	JPS Team BMW; CiBiEmme
1988	Australian Touring Car Championship	5th	Ford Sierra RS500	Freeport Racing
1988	Asia-Pacific Touring Car Championship	5th	Ford Sierra RS500	Benson & Hedges Racing
1989	Nissan Mobil 500 Series	**2nd**	Ford Sierra RS500	Benson & Hedges Racing
1989	AMSCAR Series	**1st**	Ford Sierra RS500	Benson & Hedges Racing
1989	Australian Touring Car Championship	5th	Ford Sierra RS500	Benson & Hedges Racing
1990	AMSCAR Series	**1st**	Ford Sierra RS500	Benson & Hedges Racing
1990	Australian Touring Car Championship	6th	Ford Sierra RS500	Benson & Hedges Racing
1990	Australian Endurance Championship	24th	Ford Sierra RS500	Benson & Hedges Racing
1991	AMSCAR Series	**1st**	BMW M3 Evolution	Benson & Hedges Racing
1991	Australian Touring Car Championship	**3rd**	BMW M3 Evolution	Benson & Hedges Racing
1992	Australian Touring Car Championship	**3rd**	BMW M3 Evolution	Benson & Hedges Racing
1993	Australian Touring Car Championship	9th	BMW M3 Evolution	Benson & Hedges Racing
1993	Touring Car World Cup	22nd	BMW 318i	Bigazzi Team
1994	Australian Manufacturers' Championship - Drivers	**1st**	BMW 318i	Benson & Hedges Racing
1994	Australian Touring Car Championship	11th	Holden VP Commodore	Benson & Hedges Racing
1995	Australian Touring Car Championship	11th	Ford EF Falcon	Castrol Longhurst Racing
1996	Australian Touring Car Championship	11th	Ford EF Falcon	Castrol Longhurst Racing
1997	Australian Touring Car Championship	8th	Ford EL Falcon	Castrol Longhurst Racing
1998	Australian Touring Car Championship	8th	Ford EL Falcon	Castrol Longhurst Racing
1999	Shell Championship Series	14th	Ford AU Falcon	Castrol Longhurst Racing
2000	Shell Championship Series	10th	Ford AU Falcon	Stone Brothers Racing
2001	Shell Championship Series	13th	Holden VX Commodore	Rod Nash Racing; Holden Racing Team
2002	V8 Supercar Championship Series	11th	Ford AU Falcon	Briggs Motor Sport
2003	V8 Supercar Championship Series	37th	Holden VY Commodore	Holden Racing Team
2004	V8 Supercar Championship Series	29th	Holden VY Commodore	Perkins Engineering
2006	V8 Supercar Championship Series	39th	Holden VZ Commodore	Rod Nash Racing
2007	V8 Supercar Championship Series	45th	Holden VE Commodore	Holden Racing Team
2011	Australian V8 Ute Series	48th	Holden SS VE Ute	Auto One Wildcard

=== Supercars Championship results ===
(Races in bold indicate pole position) (Races in italics indicate fastest lap)

Supercars results
Year	Team	Car	1	2	3	4	5	6	7	8	9	10	11	12	13	14	15	16	17	18	19	20	21	22	23	24	25	26	27	28	29	30	31	32	33	34	35	36	37	38	39	Position	Points
1985	JPS Team BMW	BMW 323i	WIN; R1	SAN; R2	SYM; R3	WAN; R4	AIR; R5	CAL; R6	SUR; R7	LAK; R8; 7	AMA; R9; 3	ORA; R10; 12																														16th	46
1986	JPS Team BMW	BMW 323i	AMA; R1; 3	SYM; R2; 7	SAN; R3; 8	AIR; R4; 7	WAN; R5; 7	SUR; R6; 6	CAL; R7; 12	LAK; R8; Ret	WIN; R9; Ret	ORA; R10; 8																														5th	115
1987	JPS Team BMW	BMW E30 M3	CAL; R1; 6	SYM; R2; 5	LAK; R3; 3	WAN; R4; 8	AIR; R5; 8	SUR; R6; 2	SAN; R7; Ret	AMA; R8; 2	ORA; R9; 5																															4th	116
1988	Freeport Motorsport	Ford Sierra RS Cosworth	CAL; R1; 2	SYM; R2; 4	WIN; R3; DNS	WAN; R4; Ret	AIR; R5; Ret	LAK; R6; 1	SAN; R7; Ret	AMA; R8; Ret	ORA; R9; 9																															5th	47
1989	Benson & Hedges Racing	Ford Sierra RS Cosworth	AMA; R1; 6	SYM; R2; Ret	LAK; R3; 2	WAN; R4; 2	MAL; R5; 4	SAN; R6; 5	WIN; R7; 9	ORA; R8; 5																																5th	56.5
1990	Benson & Hedges Racing	Ford Sierra RS Cosworth	AMA; R1; 4	SYM; R2; Ret	**PHI**; **R3**; **9**	WIN; R4; 2	**LAK**; **R5**; **8**	MAL; R6; 5	**BAR**; **R7**; **Ret**	ORA; R8; 9																																6th	40
1991	Benson & Hedges Racing	BMW M3 Evolution	SAN; R1; 9	SYM; R2; 4	WAN; R3; 3	LAK; R4; 3	WIN; R5; 4	AMA; R6; 1	MAL; R7; 3	LAK; R8; 1	ORA; R9; 3																															3rd	108
1992	Benson & Hedges Racing	BMW M3 Evolution II	AMA; R1; 7	AMA; R2; Ret	SAN; R3; 8	SAN; R4; 9	SYM; R5; 4	SYM; R6; 6	WIN; R7; 6	WIN; R8; 3	LAK; R9; 1	**LAK**; **R10**; **1**	EAS; R11; 2	EAS; R12; 3	MAL; R13; 2	MAL; R14; 2	BAR; R15; 5	BAR; R16; 3	ORA; R17; 6	ORA; R18; 4																						3rd	184
1993	Benson & Hedges Racing	BMW E30 M3 Evolution	AMA; R1; DNS	AMA; R2; 13	AMA; R3; 8	SYM; R4; 8	SYM; R5; 9	PHI; R6; 8	PHI; R7; 6	LAK; R8; 6	LAK; R9; 5	WIN; R10; 2	WIN; R11; 2	EAS; R12; 5	EAS; R13; 9	MAL; R14; 9	MAL; R15; 9	BAR; R16; Ret	BAR; R17; 2	ORA; R18; 9	ORA; R19; 11																					9th	69
1994	Benson & Hedges Racing	Holden VP Commodore	AMA; R1; 10	AMA; R2; 6	SAN; R3; 9	SAN; R4; 9	SYM; R5; 8	SYM; R6; 2	PHI; R7	PHI; R8	LAK; R9; Ret	LAK; R10; 12	WIN; R11; 9	WIN; R12; 7	EAS; R13; 11	EAS; R14; 10	MAL; R15; 14	MAL; R16; 6	BAR; R17; 1	**BAR**; **R18**; **8**	ORA; R19; Ret	ORA; R20; 11																				11th	74
1995	Longhurst Racing	Ford EF Falcon	SAN; R1; 6	SAN; R2; 14	SYM; R3; 8	SYM; R4; 8	BAT; R5; 9	BAT; R6; 8	PHI; R7; 5	PHI; R8; 8	LAK; R9; 8	LAK; R10; 7	WIN; R11; 10	WIN; R12; 9	EAS; R13; 9	EAS; R14; 11	MAL; R15; Ret	MAL; R16; 9	BAR; R17; 5	BAR; R18; Ret	ORA; R19; Ret	ORA; R20; 7																				11th	65
1996	Longhurst Racing	Ford EF Falcon	EAS; R1; 21	EAS; R2; 7	EAS; R3; 7	SAN; R4; 16	SAN; R5; Ret	SAN; R6; DNS	BAT; R7; 11	BAT; R8; 5	BAT; R9; 12	SYM; R10; 8	SYM; R11; 8	SYM; R12; 8	PHI; R13; 11	PHI; R14; 4	PHI; R15; Ret	CAL; R16; 8	CAL; R17; 3	CAL; R18; 6	LAK; R19; 9	LAK; R20; 7	LAK; R21; 15	BAR; R22; 8	BAR; R23; 7	BAR; R24; 5	MAL; R25; Ret	MAL; R26; 11	MAL; R27; Ret	ORA; R28; 13	ORA; R29; 10	ORA; R30; 11										11th	100
1997	Longhurst Racing	Ford EL Falcon	CAL; R1; 9	CAL; R2; 12	CAL; R3; Ret	PHI; R4; 8	PHI; R5; 13	PHI; R6; 9	SAN; R7; 7	SAN; R8; 6	SAN; R9; 7	SYM; R10; 10	SYM; R11; 11	SYM; R12; 8	WIN; R13; 13	WIN; R14; Ret	WIN; R15; Ret	EAS; R16; 9	EAS; R17; 11	EAS; R18; 7	LAK; R19; 5	LAK; R20; 6	LAK; R21; 3	BAR; R22; 4	BAR; R23; 14	BAR; R24; 8	MAL; R25; Ret	MAL; R26; 11	MAL; R27; 6	ORA; R28; 5	ORA; R29; 4	ORA; R30; 4										8th	358
1998	Longhurst Racing	Ford EL Falcon	SAN; R1; 8	SAN; R2; Ret	SAN; R3; 10	SYM; R4; 11	SYM; R5; 22	SYM; R6; 15	LAK; R7; 5	LAK; R8; 5	LAK; R9; 5	PHI; R10; 9	PHI; R11; 7	PHI; R12; 5	WIN; R13; 5	WIN; R14; 6	WIN; R15; 4	MAL; R16; 11	MAL; R17; 8	MAL; R18; 14	BAR; R19; Ret	BAR; R20; DNS	BAR; R21; 10	CAL; R22; 15	CAL; R23; 26	CAL; R24; C	HDV; R25; 4	HDV; R26; 3	HDV; R27; 14	ORA; R28; 4	ORA; R29; 4	ORA; R30; 5										8th	586
1999	Longhurst Racing	Ford AU Falcon	EAS; R1; 7	EAS; R2; 10	EAS; R3; 7	ADE; R4; Ret	BAR; R5; 12	BAR; R6; 6	BAR; R7; 21	PHI; R8; 15	PHI; R9; 6	PHI; R10; 12	HDV; R11; 12	HDV; R12; 15	HDV; R13; 6	SAN; R14; 9	SAN; R15; 16	SAN; R16; 12	QLD; R17; 15	QLD; R18; 16	QLD; R19; 7	CAL; R20; 12	CAL; R21; 9	CAL; R22; 9	SYM; R23; 12	SYM; R24; 17	SYM; R25; 11	WIN; R26; 6	WIN; R27; 13	WIN; R28; Ret	ORA; R29; Ret	ORA; R30; 15	ORA; R31; 9	QLD; R32; Ret	BAT; R33; Ret							14th	830
2000	Stone Brothers Racing	Ford AU Falcon	PHI; R1; Ret	PHI; R2; 8	BAR; R3; 8	BAR; R4; 9	BAR; R5; 10	ADE; R6; 9	ADE; R7; 10	EAS; R8; 8	EAS; R9; 8	EAS; R10; 4	HDV; R11; 7	HDV; R12; 5	HDV; R13; Ret	CAN; R14; 18	CAN; R15; 19	CAN; R16; 9	QLD; R17; 7	QLD; R18; 11	QLD; R19; 9	WIN; R20; Ret	WIN; R21; 18	WIN; R22; 4	ORA; R23; 9	ORA; R24; 6	ORA; R25; 6	CAL; R26; 10	CAL; R27; 8	CAL; R28; 6	QLD; R29; 8	SAN; R30; 5	**SAN**; **R31**; **9**	SAN; R32; 12	BAT; R33; Ret							10th	866
2001	Rod Nash Racing	Holden VX Commodore	PHI; R1; 19	PHI; R2; 28	ADE; R3; 13	ADE; R4; 11	EAS; R5; 10	EAS; R6; 20	HDV; R7; 19	HDV; R8; 21	HDV; R9; 28	CAN; R10; Ret	CAN; R11; 23	CAN; R12; Ret	BAR; R13; 17	BAR; R14; 15	BAR; R15; 16	CAL; R16; 20	CAL; R17; 20	CAL; R18; 19	ORA; R19; 13	ORA; R20; 19	QLD; R21; 5	WIN; R22; Ret	WIN; R23; DNS	BAT; R24; 1	PUK; R25; 6	PUK; R26; 5	PUK; R27; 9	SAN; R28; 22	SAN; R29; 20	SAN; R30; 17										13th	1894
2002	Briggs Motorsport	Ford AU Falcon	ADE; R1; 7	ADE; R2; 18	PHI; R3; 6	PHI; R4; 7	EAS; R5; 22	EAS; R6; 17	EAS; R7; 16	HDV; R8; 24	HDV; R9; 20	HDV; R10; 20	CAN; R11; 21	CAN; R12; 5	CAN; R13; 11	BAR; R14; 10	BAR; R15; 4	BAR; R16; 29	ORA; R17; 11	ORA; R18; 11	WIN; R19; 20	WIN; R20; 30	QLD; R21; 24	BAT; R22; 6	SUR; R23; 17	SUR; R24; 5	PUK; R25; 14	PUK; R26; 10	PUK; R27; 13	SAN; R28; 15	SAN; R29; 8											11th	792
2003	Holden Racing Team	Holden VY Commodore	ADE; R1	ADE; R1	PHI; R3	EAS; R4	WIN; R5	BAR; R6	BAR; R7	BAR; R8	HDV; R9	HDV; R10	HDV; R11	QLD; R12	ORA; R13	SAN; R14; 10	BAT; R15; 5	SUR; R16	SUR; R17	PUK; R18	PUK; R19	PUK; R20	EAS; R21	EAS; R22																		37th	176
2004	Perkins Engineering	Holden VY Commodore	ADE; R1; DNS	ADE; R2; DNS	EAS; R3; 24	PUK; R4; 26	PUK; R5; 13	PUK; R6; 13	HDV; R7; 26	HDV; R8; 23	HDV; R9; 13	BAR; R10; 14	BAR; R11; 19	BAR; R12; 20	QLD; R13; 8	WIN; R14; 17	ORA; R15; 16	ORA; R16; 16	SAN; R17; 8	BAT; R18; Ret	SUR; R19; 23	SUR; R20; Ret	SYM; R21	SYM; R22	SYM; R23	EAS; R24	EAS; R25	EAS; R26														29th	856
2006	Rod Nash Racing	Holden VZ Commodore	ADE; R1	ADE; R2	PUK; R3	PUK; R4	PUK; R5	BAR; R6	BAR; R7	BAR; R8	WIN; R9	WIN; R10	WIN; R11	HDV; R12	HDV; R13	HDV; R14	QLD; R15	QLD; R16	QLD; R17	ORA; R18	ORA; R19	ORA; R20	SAN; R21; 12	BAT; R22; 7	SUR; R23	SUR; R24	SUR; R25	SYM; R26	SYM; R27	SYM; R28	BHR; R29	BHR; R30	BHR; R31	PHI; R32	PHI; R33	PHI; R34						39th	260
2007	Holden Racing Team	Holden VE Commodore	ADE; R1	ADE; R2	BAR; R3	BAR; R4	BAR; R5	PUK; R6	PUK; R7	PUK; R8	WIN; R9	WIN; R10	WIN; R11	EAS; R12	EAS; R13	EAS; R14	HDV; R15	HDV; R16	HDV; R17	QLD; R18	QLD; R19	QLD; R20	ORA; R21	ORA; R22	ORA; R23	SAN; R24; 13	BAT; R25	SUR; R26	SUR; R27	SUR; R28	BHR; R29	BHR; R30	BHR; R31	SYM; R32	SYM; R33	SYM; R34	PHI; R35	PHI; R36	PHI; R37			45th	12

=== Complete World Sportscar Championship results ===
(key) (Races in bold indicate pole position) (Races in italics indicate fastest lap)

Year	Team	Car	1	2	3	4	5	6	7	8	9	10	11	DC	Points
1984	(Australia) JPS Team BMW	BMW 320i	MNZ	SIL	LMS	NUR	BHT	MOS	SPA	IMO	FJI	KYL	SAN ovr:14 cls:1	NC	0

=== Complete World Touring Car Championship results ===
(key) (Races in bold indicate pole position) (Races in italics indicate fastest lap)

Year	Team	Car	1	2	3	4	5	6	7	8	9	10	11	DC	Points
1987	(Australia) JPS Team BMW	BMW M3	MNZ	JAR	DIJ	NUR	SPA	BNO	SIL	BAT ovr:4 cls:1	CLD; Ret			NC	0
1987	(West Germany) BMW Motorsport (Italy) CiBiEmme	BMW M3										WEL ovr:7 cls:2	FJI	NC	0

† Not registered for series & points

=== Complete Bathurst 1000 results ===
Year	Car#	Team	Co-drivers	Car	Class	Laps	Overall position	Class position
1983	33	(Australia) Dreamworld	(Australia) Mike Burgmann	Chevrolet Camaro Z28	A	121	DNF	DNF
1984	31	(Australia) JPS Team BMW	(New Zealand) Jim Richards	BMW 635 CSi	Group C	39	DNF	DNF
1985	1	(Australia) JPS Team BMW	(New Zealand) Jim Richards	BMW 635 CSi	C	160	4th	4th
1986	1	(Australia) JPS Team BMW	(New Zealand) Jim Richards	BMW 635 CSi	C	161	6th	5th
1987	44	(Australia) JPS Team BMW	(New Zealand) Jim Richards	BMW M3	2	156	4th	**1st**
1988	25	(Australia) Benson & Hedges Racing	(Australia) Tomas Mezera	Ford Sierra RS500	A	161	**1st**	**1st**
1989	20	(Australia) Benson & Hedges Racing	(Australia) Alan Jones (New Zealand) Denny Hulme	Ford Sierra RS500	A	158	5th	5th
1989	25	(Australia) Benson & Hedges Racing	(New Zealand) Neville Crichton	Ford Sierra RS500	A	27	DNF	DNF
1990	25	(Australia) Benson & Hedges Racing	(Australia) Mark McLaughlin	Ford Sierra RS500	1	53	DNF	DNF
1991	25	(Australia) Benson & Hedges Racing	(Australia) Alan Jones	BMW M3 Evolution	2	138	DNF	DNF
1992	25	(Australia) Benson & Hedges Racing	(Venezuela) Johnny Cecotto	BMW M3 Evolution	A	142	4th	4th
1993	25	(Australia) Benson & Hedges Racing	(United Kingdom) Steve Soper	BMW M3 Evolution	A	79	DNF	DNF
1994	25	(Australia) Benson & Hedges Racing	(Australia) Charlie O'Brien	Holden VP Commodore	A	161	4th	4th
1995	25	(Australia) Castrol Longhurst Ford	(Australia) Wayne Park	Ford EF Falcon		149	9th	9th
1996	25	(Australia) Castrol Longhurst Ford	(Australia) Steven Ellery	Ford EF Falcon		161	**3rd**	**3rd**
1997	25	(Australia) Castrol Longhurst Ford	(Australia) Charlie O'Brien	Ford EL Falcon	L1	110	DNF	DNF
1998	25	(Australia) Castrol Longhurst Ford	(Australia) Geoff Brabham	Ford EL Falcon	OC	157	8th	8th
1999	25	(Australia) Castrol Longhurst Ford	(Australia) Adam Macrow	Ford AU Falcon		150	DNF	DNF
2000	9	(Australia) Stone Brothers Racing	(Australia) David Besnard	Ford AU Falcon		151	DNF	DNF
2001	1	(Australia) Holden Racing Team	(Australia) Mark Skaife	Holden VX Commodore		161	**1st**	**1st**
2002	66	(Australia) Team Betta Electrical	(Australia) Matthew White	Ford AU Falcon		161	6th	6th
2003	2	(Australia) Holden Racing Team	(New Zealand) Jim Richards	Holden VY Commodore		161	5th	5th
2004	8	(Australia) Perkins Engineering	(Australia) Paul Dumbrell	Holden VY Commodore		129	DNF	DNF
2005	44	(Australia) Team Dynamik (Australia) Longhurst Racing	(Brazil) Max Wilson	Holden VZ Commodore		32	DNF	DNF
2006	55	(Australia) Rod Nash Racing	(Australia) Steve Owen	Holden VZ Commodore		161	7th	7th

=== Complete Sandown Endurance results ===
Year	Team	Co-drivers	Car	Class	Laps	Overall position	Class position
1984	(Australia) JPS Team BMW	(New Zealand) Jim Richards	BMW 635 CSi	Over 3000cc	72	DNF	DNF
1985	(Australia) JPS Team BMW	(New Zealand) Jim Richards	BMW 635 CSi	A	129	**1st**	**1st**
1986	(Australia) JPS Team BMW	(New Zealand) Jim Richards	BMW 635 CSi	B	127	5th	5th
1987	(Australia) JPS Team BMW	(New Zealand) Jim Richards	BMW M3	B	118	DNF	DNF
1988	(Australia) Benson & Hedges Racing	(Australia) Tomas Mezera	Ford Sierra RS500	A	123	5th	5th
1989	(Australia) Benson & Hedges Racing	(New Zealand) Neville Crichton	Ford Sierra RS500	A	87	DNF	DNF
1992	(Australia) Benson & Hedges Racing	(Australia) Paul Morris	BMW M3 Evolution	3A	136	**2nd**	**2nd**
1994	(Australia) Benson & Hedges Racing	(Australia) Charlie O'Brien	Holden VP Commodore	V8	161	4th	4th
1995	(Australia) Castrol Longhurst Ford	(Australia) Wayne Park	Ford EF Falcon		160	4th	4th
1996	(Australia) Castrol Longhurst Ford	(Australia) Steven Ellery	Ford EF Falcon		160	4th	4th
1997	(Australia) Castrol Longhurst Ford	(Australia) Charlie O'Brien	Ford EL Falcon		151	10th	10th
1998	(Australia) Castrol Longhurst Ford	(Australia) Geoff Brabham	Ford EL Falcon		7	DNF	DNF
2003	(Australia) Holden Racing Team	(New Zealand) Jim Richards	Holden VY Commodore		140	10th	10th
2004	(Australia) Castrol Perkins Racing	(Australia) Paul Dumbrell	Holden VY Commodore		159	8th	8th
2007	(Australia) Holden Racing Team	(Australia) Glenn Seton	Holden VE Commodore		160	13th	13th

=== Complete Bathurst 12 Hour results ===
Year	Team	Co-drivers	Car	Class	Laps	Overall position	Class position
1992	BMW Australia Pty Ltd	(Australia) Alan Jones (New Zealand) Neville Crichton	BMW M5	C	251	**2nd**	**1st**
2009	TMR Australia	(Australia) Rod Salmon (Australia) Damien White	Mitsubishi Lancer RS Evo X	C	239	**1st**	**1st**
2017	(Australia) BMW Team SRM	(Germany) Timo Glock (Australia) Mark Skaife (Australia) Russell Ingall	BMW M6 GT3	AP	134	DNF	DNF
2018	(Australia) Boat Works Racing	(Australia) Matthew Brabham (Australia) Aaron Seton	BMW M4 GT4	C	250	22nd	**1st**

Sporting positions
Preceded by Peter Brock; David Parsons; Peter McLeod	Winner of the Bathurst 1000; 1988 (with Tomas Mezera)	Succeeded by Dick Johnson; John Bowe
Preceded by Peter Doulman	Winner of the Australian Manufacturers' Championship; 1994	Succeeded by Paul Morris
Preceded by Garth Tander; Jason Bargwanna	Winner of the Bathurst 1000; 2001 (with Mark Skaife)	Succeeded by Mark Skaife; Jim Richards
Preceded by Graham Alexander; Rod Salmon; Damien White	Winner of the Bathurst 12 Hour; 2009 (with Rod Salmon & Damien White)	Succeeded by John Bowe; Garry Holt; Paul Morris
