= Paul Morris (racing driver) =

Australian racing driver (born 1967)

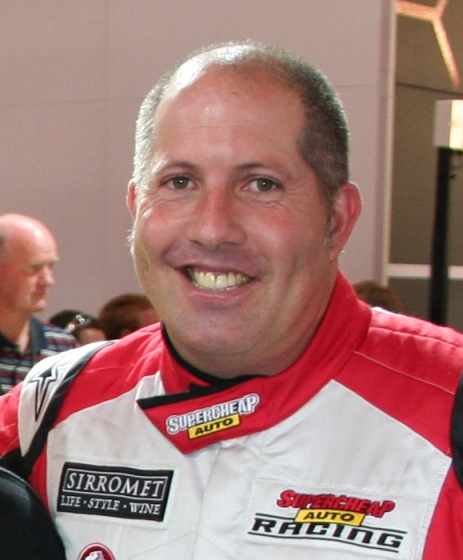
- Morris in 2008
- Nationality: Australian
- Born: 22 December 1967 (age 58) Morwell, Victoria, Australia
- Relatives: Nash Morris (son)

Boost Mobile Super Trucks career
- Debut season: 2020
- Categorisation: FIA Bronze
- Car number: 67
- Starts: 12
- Championships: 1
- Wins: 4
- Podiums: 7
- Poles: 0
- Best finish: 1st in 2021
- Finished last season: 2021

Stadium Super Trucks career
- Debut season: 2015
- Car number: 67
- Starts: 64
- Championships: 1
- Wins: 3
- Podiums: 21
- Poles: 5
- Best finish: 1st in 2017
- Finished last season: 14th (2019)

Previous series
- 1989–91 1991 1992–94 1995–01 1998 1999–2014 2009–16: Australian Formula Ford; Australian Drivers' Champ. Australian Touring Cars; Australian Super Touring; Indy Lights; V8 Supercars; Development V8 Series

Championship titles
- 2021 2017 1995 1996–97 1997 1998 1999 2000–01: Boost Mobile Super Trucks; Stadium Super Trucks; Australian Super Touring; TraNZam Series; Australian Super Touring; Queensland Gemini Series; Australian Super Touring; Australian Super Touring
- Statistics up to date as of 9 December 2021.

Paul "the Dude" Morris (born 22 December 1967) is an Australian motor racing driver and team owner. The owner of Paul Morris Motorsport, he competes in Queensland sprint car racing and the Stadium Super Trucks, the latter of which includes the series' Australian Boost Mobile Super Trucks championship. He won the SST championship in 2017 and the Boost Mobile Super Trucks title in 2021.

Morris is one of two people, alongside Shane van Gisbergen, to have won all three major car racing events at Mount Panorama; the Bathurst 1000, Bathurst 6 Hour and Bathurst 12 Hour.

== Early career ==
Morris started his motor racing career at the age of 19 in 1987, driving in the Queensland Gemini Series. He won Rookie of the Year in his debut season, and won the state championship the following year. He spent the next three years competing in Formula Ford.

Morris made his Bathurst debut in 1991, driving a Toyota Corolla. He won the Class C title that year with Geoff Full.

Morris joined the BMW Works team in 1992, and competed in the Australian Touring Car Championship for several years. Morris went on to compete in the Australian Super Touring Championship from 1994 to 2000 (excluding 1998), winning four championships. His notable sponsors during this time were Benson & Hedges and Diet Coke. He also competed in the V8 Touring Car Championship full-time in 1994, driving a Holden Commodore sponsored by Diet Coke. That same year, he would claim another class victory at the Bathurst 1000 with German driver Altfrid Heger in a BMW, having written off his Holden in testing prior to the race.

In 1998, Morris drove for PacWest Racing in the PPG Dayton Indy Lights Championship in the United States. His best result was sixth in the opening round at Homestead.

== V8 Supercars ==
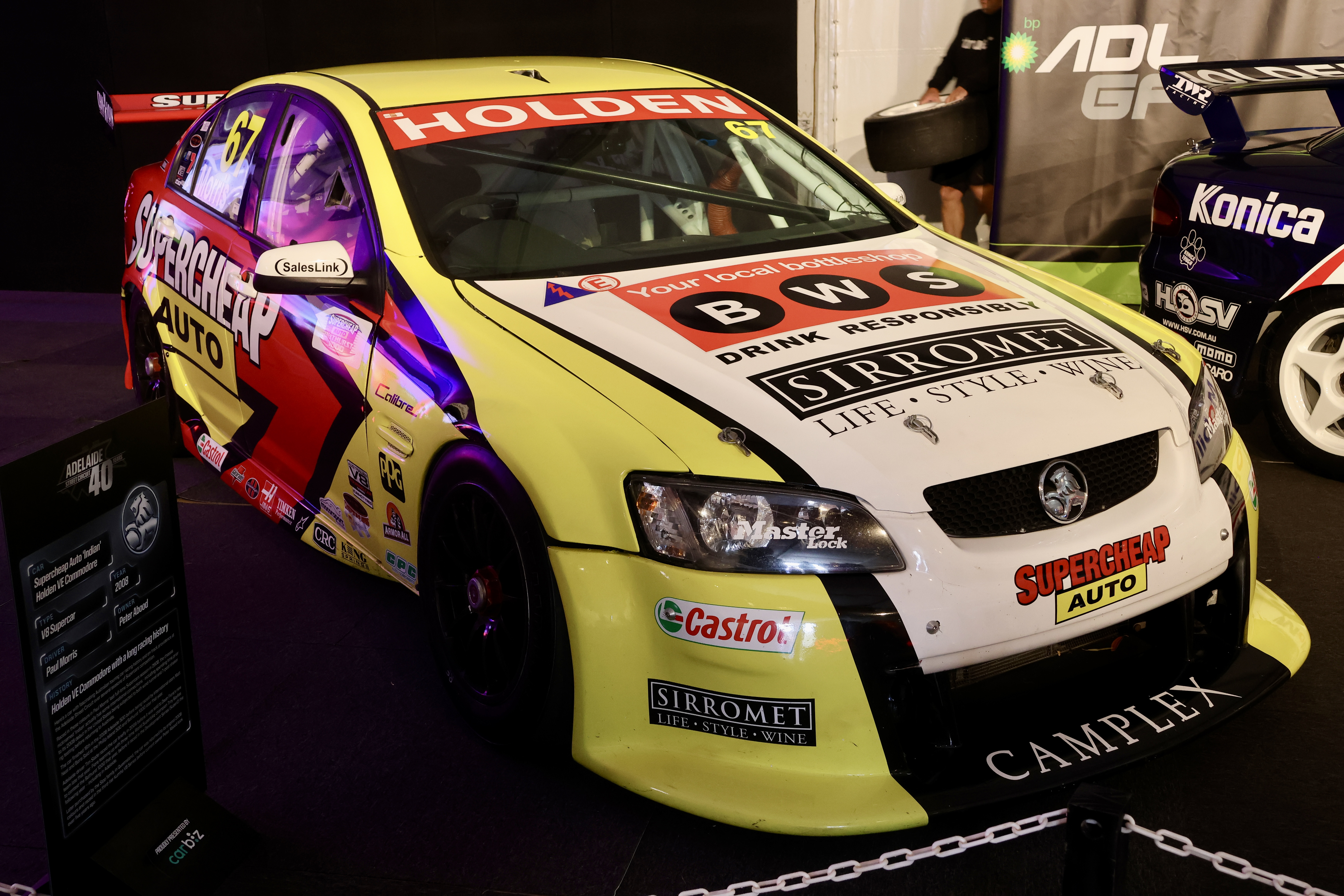
Holden Commodore (VE) of Morris on display at the 2025 Adelaide 500

Morris co-drove with the Holden Racing Team in the 1999 endurance events. He finished third with Mark Skaife at Bathurst in that year.

From 2000, Morris again competed in the V8 Supercar Series full-time. Originally sponsored by Big Kev, he was involved in a major start-line accident at the Oran Park round in 2000. He suffered a number of fractured vertebrae in this accident, and narrowly escaped the flaming wreckage of his VS Commodore.

Morris recovered without missing any V8 Supercar races, and he went on to achieve his first major success at Calder Park Raceway in 2001, where he won two of the three races and won the round overall.

In the week leading up to the final V8 Supercar round of 2008, Morris announced he would no longer be driving full-time in 2009 and that the team were searching for a full-time replacement in the No. 67 Commodore.

In 2011, Morris competed in the second-tier Fujitsu V8 Supercar Series in one of the teams older Commodores.

In 2014, Morris won the Bathurst 1000 outright for the first time as co-driver to Chaz Mostert for Ford Performance Racing. Morris had previously 'won' the 1997 AMP Bathurst 1000 in a Super Touring BMW 320i with Craig Baird. However the Morris/Baird BMW was disqualified immediately after the race as the team had mistakenly left Baird in the car at its last pit stop, resulting in Baird breaching race regulations by driving for more than three continuous hours. The disqualification handed the win to team mates Geoff and David Brabham.

Speaking over the 2015 V8 Supercars Winton SuperSprint, Morris announced his retirement from Bathurst after losing his co-driver seat to Cameron Waters.

Morris continues to race in the V8 Development Series.

== Sprintcars ==
Morris competes in Speedway Sprintcars in Australia in the KRE-engined No. 67 Supercheap Auto Sprintcar. Morris took his first Sprintcar pole position in Round 4 of the KRE Race Engines Track Championship at Brisbane International Speedway (Archerfield Speedway) in January 2011. He has also had heat wins in World Series Sprintcars.

Morris suffered a major crash at Archerfield during round 6 of the 2012/13 World Series Sprintcars. After winning his earlier heat race, Morris started from position 5 in the B Main, but lasted less than a ¼ of a lap after clipping the wheels of another car on the front straight resulting in his car going end over end and finally coming to rest in the middle of turn 2. Morris escaped the crash without injury, but his Sprintcar was in need of major repair.

== Stadium Super Trucks ==
In 2015, Morris made his Speed Energy Formula Off-Road (Stadium Super Trucks) debut at Surfers Paradise, where he finished third in the first race. A doubleheader on 25 October saw Morris finish fifth and second to score the overall win. A year later, he ran much of the 2016 schedule and finished fourth in points, the highest championship run for a winless driver that year.

Morris contested the full 2017 schedule as he scored three wins at Adelaide and Darwin (twice). Entering the season finale at Lake Elsinore Diamond, Morris trailed Matthew Brabham by 15 points but did not participate due to a rib injury. In his place, he had off-road veteran Jerett Brooks drive his No. 67 truck, with all points scored by Brooks going to Morris; Brooks finished eighth and second in the weekend, enabling Morris to win the 2017 championship by one point over Brabham.

In May 2018, the series formed an alliance with Boost Mobile to increase its presence in Australia. As part of the agreement, Paul Morris Motorsport became a logistics partner for the series' Australian operations. However, SST was banned by the Confederation of Australian Motor Sport (CAMS) later that month for safety reasons. When the trucks returned in 2019 under the Boost Mobile Super Trucks name, Paul Morris Motorsport's Norwell Motorplex became its headquarters. In October 2019, Morris also ran his first SST race of the year at Gold Coast; he led much of the second race before colliding with Cole Potts on the final lap, surrendering the win to Brabham.

When the series began an Australian championship in 2020 called the Boost Mobile Super Trucks, Morris and Paul Morris Racing Academy development driver Luke van Herwaarde partnered to race under the Team Norwell name.

The 2021 Boost Mobile Super Trucks began with Morris winning two of three races in the opener at Symmons Plains Raceway before finishing second to Shae Davies in the last. The same pattern of winning the first two but being denied a sweep by Davies occurred a round later at Hidden Valley Raceway. The season ended early after the COVID-19 pandemic cancelled many of the final rounds. Morris and Davies were mathematically tied for the points lead with 93 points apiece, and the former held the tiebreaker as he had four wins to Davies' two.

== Personal life ==
Morris is nicknamed "the Dude". He received the moniker when he returned from a trip to the United States in the 1990s, where the word "dude" was frequently used.

His son Nash Morris is also a racing driver who competes in the Super3 Series and Boost Mobile Super Trucks.

== Career highlights ==
- Winner, Australian Super Touring Championship 1995, 1997, 1999, 2000
- Winner, Bathurst 1000 (Australian Touring Car Championship) 1991 (Class C), 1994 (Class B)
- Winner, Bathurst 500 (Super Touring) 1999
- 3rd, Bob Jane T-Marts 1000 at Mount Panorama Circuit 1999
- Winner, Calder Park Raceway round of the 2001 Shell Championship Series
- 3rd, Bathurst 24 Hour at Mount Panorama Circuit 2003
- Winner Bathurst 12 Hour 2007 (BMW)
- Winner 2014 Bathurst 1000 with Chaz Mostert
- Winner 2017 Bathurst 6 Hour with Luke Searle
- Winner, Stadium Super Trucks 2017

== Career results ==
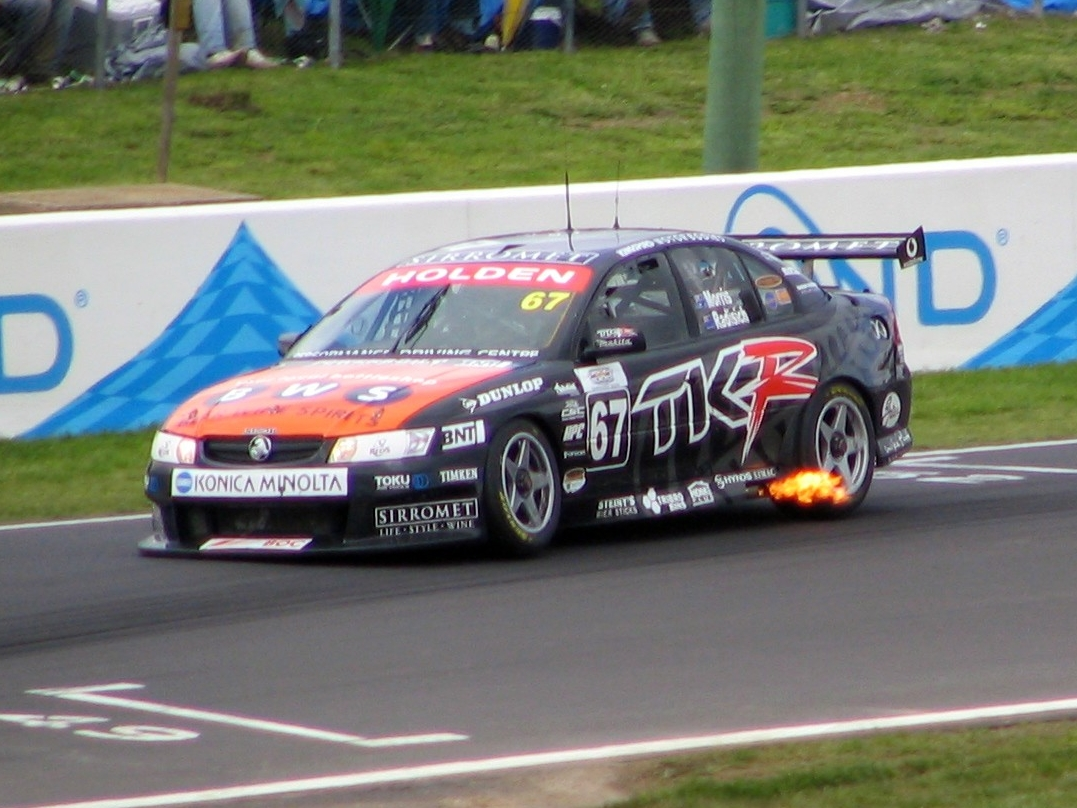
Morris placed 19th in the 2005 V8 Supercar Championship Series driving a Holden VZ Commodore

| Season | Series | Position | Car | Team |
|---|---|---|---|---|
| 1989 | Motorcraft Formula Ford Driver to Europe Series | 5th | Van Diemen RF89 Ford | Paul Morris |
| 1990 | Motorcraft Formula Ford Driver to Europe Series | **3rd** | Van Diemen RF89 Ford | Morgan Vault Racing |
| 1991 | Motorcraft Formula Ford Driver to Europe Series | 5th | Van Diemen RF91 Ford | Speedtech |
| 1991 | Australian Drivers' Championship | 4th | Shrike NB89H Holden | |
| 1992 | Australian Touring Car Championship | 9th | BMW M3 Evolution II | Tony Longhurst Racing |
| 1993 | Australian Touring Car Championship | 16th | BMW M3 Evolution II | Tony Longhurst Racing |
| 1994 | Australian Touring Car Championship | 13th | Holden VP Commodore | LoGaMo Racing |
| 1994 | Australian Manufacturers' Championship | **2nd** | BMW 318i | LoGaMo Racing |
| 1995 | Australian Super Touring Championship | **1st** | BMW 318i | Paul Morris Motorsport |
| 1995 | Australian GT Production Car Series | 5th | BMW M3R | Paul Morris Motorsport |
| 1996 | Australian Super Touring Championship | **2nd** | BMW 318i | Paul Morris Motorsport |
| 1996–97 | TraNZam Championship | **1st** | | |
| 1997 | Australian Super Touring Championship | **1st** | BMW 320i | Paul Morris Motorsport |
| 1998 | Indy Lights Championship | 21st | Lola T97/20 Buick | PacWest Racing |
| 1998 | Queensland Gemini Championship | **1st** | Holden Gemini Coupe | Paul Morris Motorsport |
| 1999 | Australian Super Touring Championship | **1st** | BMW 320i | Paul Morris Motorsport |
| 1999 | Shell Championship Series | 37th | Holden VT Commodore | Holden Racing Team |
| 2000 | Shell Championship Series | 19th | Holden VS Commodore; Holden VT Commodore | Paul Morris Motorsport |
| 2000–01 | Australian Super Touring Championship | **1st** | BMW 320i | Paul Morris Motorsport |
| 2001 | Shell Championship Series | 17th | Holden VT Commodore | Paul Morris Motorsport |
| 2002 | V8 Supercar Championship Series | 35th | Holden VX Commodore | Paul Morris Motorsport |
| 2003 | V8 Supercar Championship Series | 23rd | Holden VY Commodore | Paul Morris Motorsport |
| 2004 | V8 Supercar Championship Series | 22nd | Holden VY Commodore | Paul Morris Motorsport |
| 2005 | V8 Supercar Championship Series | 19th | Holden VZ Commodore | Paul Morris Motorsport |
| 2006 | V8 Supercar Championship Series | 21st | Holden VZ Commodore | Paul Morris Motorsport |
| 2007 | V8 Supercar Championship Series | 22nd | Holden VZ Commodore; Holden VE Commodore | Paul Morris Motorsport |
| 2008 | V8 Supercar Championship Series | 20th | Holden VE Commodore | Paul Morris Motorsport |
| 2009 | Fujitsu V8 Supercar Series | 35th | Holden VZ Commodore | Paul Morris Motorsport |
| 2009 | V8 Supercar Championship Series | 43rd | Holden VE Commodore | Paul Morris Motorsport |
| 2010 | Fujitsu V8 Supercar Series | 16th | Holden VZ Commodore | Paul Morris Motorsport |
| 2010 | V8 Supercar Championship Series | 40th | Holden VE Commodore | Paul Morris Motorsport |
| 2011 | International V8 Supercars Championship | 41st | Holden VE Commodore | Paul Morris Motorsport |
| 2011 | Fujitsu V8 Supercar Series | 8th | Holden VE Commodore | Paul Morris Motorsport |
| 2012 | V8SuperTourer Championship | 33rd | Holden VE Commodore | AV8 Motorsport |
| 2012 | Dunlop V8 Supercar Series | 24th | Holden VE Commodore | Paul Morris Motorsport |
| 2012 | International V8 Supercars Championship | 57th | Ford FG Falcon | Paul Morris Motorsport |
| 2013 | V8SuperTourer Championship | 23rd | Holden VE Commodore | MPC Motorsport |
| 2013 | Dunlop V8 Supercar Series | 12th | Holden VE Commodore | Paul Morris Motorsport |
| 2013 | International V8 Supercars Championship | 48th | Holden VF Commodore | Lucas Dumbrell Motorsport |
| 2013 | Pirtek Enduro Cup | 20th | Holden VF Commodore | Lucas Dumbrell Motorsport |
| 2014 | International V8 Supercars Championship | 27th | Ford FG Falcon | Ford Performance Racing |
| 2014 | Pirtek Enduro Cup | **2nd** | Ford FG Falcon | Ford Performance Racing |
| 2015 | V8 Supercars Dunlop Series | 14th | Ford FG Falcon | Paul Morris Motorsport |
| 2015 | Kerrick Sports Sedan Series | 14th | MARC | MARC Cars Australia |
| 2015 | Stadium Super Trucks | 11th | Stadium Super Truck | Supercheap Auto |
| 2016 | Australian Production Car Series | **3rd** | BMW M135i | Roadchill Freight Express |
| 2016 | Stadium Super Trucks | 4th | Stadium Super Truck | UFD Racing |
| 2017 | Stadium Super Trucks | **1st** | Stadium Super Truck | UFD Racing |
| 2018 | Stadium Super Trucks | 8th | Stadium Super Truck | UFD Racing |
| 2019 | Stadium Super Trucks | 14th | Stadium Super Truck | UFD Racing |
| 2020 | Boost Mobile Super Trucks | N/A | Stadium Super Truck | Team Norwell |
| 2021 | Boost Mobile Super Trucks | **1st** | Stadium Super Truck | Team Norwell |

=== Complete Bathurst 1000 results ===
| Year | Car# | Team | Car | Co-driver | Position | Laps |
|---|---|---|---|---|---|---|
| 1991 | 78 | Speedtech Motorsport | Toyota Sprinter | (Australia) Geoff Full | 12th | 140 |
| 1992 | 20 | Benson & Hedges Racing | BMW M3 | (New Zealand) Denny Hulme | DNF | 32 |
| 1993 | 23 | LoGaMo Racing | BMW M3 | (Germany) Joachim Winkelhock | 15th | 146 |
| 1994 | 46 | LoGaMo Racing | BMW 318i | (Germany) Altfrid Heger | 10th | 155 |
| 1997* | 2 | Paul Morris Motorsport | BMW 320i | (New Zealand) Craig Baird | DSQ | 161 |
| 1998* | 2 | Brad Jones Racing | Audi A4 | (New Zealand) Paul Radisich | DNF | 84 |
| 1999 | 2 | Holden Racing Team | Holden VT Commodore | (Australia) Mark Skaife | **3rd** | 161 |
| 2000 | 29 | Paul Morris Motorsport | Holden VT Commodore | (United Kingdom) Matt Neal | 12th | 158 |
| 2001 | 29 | Paul Morris Motorsport | Holden VT Commodore | (New Zealand) Ashley Stichbury | 12th | 159 |
| 2002 | 29 | Paul Morris Motorsport | Holden VX Commodore | (Australia) Wayne Wakefield | DNF | 135 |
| 2003 | 29 | Paul Morris Motorsport | Holden VY Commodore | (New Zealand) John Faulkner | DNF | 5 |
| 2004 | 29 | Paul Morris Motorsport | Holden VY Commodore | (Australia) Alan Gurr | DNF | 50 |
| 2005 | 67 | Paul Morris Motorsport | Holden VZ Commodore | (New Zealand) Paul Radisich | DNF | 26 |
| 2006 | 67 | Paul Morris Motorsport | Holden VZ Commodore | (Australia) Steve Ellery | 6th | 161 |
| 2007 | 67 | Paul Morris Motorsport | Holden VE Commodore | (Australia) Steve Ellery | DNF | 145 |
| 2008 | 39 | Paul Morris Motorsport | Holden VE Commodore | (Australia) Russell Ingall | 18th | 156 |
| 2009 | 67 | Paul Morris Motorsport | Holden VE Commodore | (Australia) Tim Slade | 7th | 161 |
| 2010 | 39 | Paul Morris Motorsport | Holden VE Commodore | (Australia) Russell Ingall | 8th | 161 |
| 2011 | 49 | Paul Morris Motorsport | Holden VE Commodore | (Australia) Steve Owen | 11th | 161 |
| 2012 | 49 | Paul Morris Motorsport | Ford FG Falcon | (Australia) Steve Owen | DNF | 53 |
| 2013 | 80 | Lucas Dumbrell Motorsport | Holden VF Commodore | (Australia) Scott Pye | 6th | 161 |
| 2014 | 6 | Ford Performance Racing | Ford FG Falcon | (Australia) Chaz Mostert | **1st** | 161 |

* Super Touring race

=== Indy Lights results ===
| Year | Team | 1 | 2 | 3 | 4 | 5 | 6 | 7 | 8 | 9 | 10 | 11 | 12 | 13 | 14 | Rank | Points | Ref |
|---|---|---|---|---|---|---|---|---|---|---|---|---|---|---|---|---|---|---|
| 1998 | PacWest Lights | MIA; 6 | LBH; 20 | NZR; 22 | STL; 18 | MIL; 24 | DET; 13 | POR; 7 | CLE; 19 | TOR; 20 | MIS; WD | TRS; 9 | VAN; 20 | LAG | FON | 21st | 18 | |

=== Complete Bathurst 24 Hour results ===
| Year | Team | Co-drivers | Car | Class | Laps | Pos. | Class pos. |
|---|---|---|---|---|---|---|---|
| 2002 | (Australia) Prancing Horse Racing Scuderia | (Australia) John Bowe (Australia) Brad Jones (Australia) John Teulan | Ferrari 360 N-GT | 1 | 96 | DNF | DNF |
| 2003 | (Australia) John Teulan | (Australia) Peter Fitzgerald (Australia) John Teulan (Australia) Scott Shearman | Porsche 996 GT3 RC | A | 515 | **3rd** | **3rd** |

=== Bathurst 6 Hour ===
| Year | Team | Co-drivers | Car | Class | Laps | Pos. | Class pos. |
|---|---|---|---|---|---|---|---|
| 2016 | David Searle | (Australia) Luke Searle (Australia) Barry Graham | BMW M135i | A1 | 0 | DNF | DNF |
| 2017 | Roadchill Freight Express | (Australia) Luke Searle | BMW M135i Hatch F20 | A1 | 113 | 1st | 1st |
| 2021 | Miedecke Motorsport | (Australia) George Miedecke (Australia) Brodie Kostecki | Ford Mustang GT | A2 | 120 | 6th | 1st |

=== Supercars Championship results ===
(Races in bold indicate pole position) (Races in italics indicate fastest lap)

Supercars results
| Year | Team | Car | 1 | 2 | 3 | 4 | 5 | 6 | 7 | 8 | 9 | 10 | 11 | 12 | 13 | 14 | 15 | 16 | 17 | 18 | 19 | 20 | 21 | 22 | 23 | 24 | 25 | 26 | 27 | 28 | 29 | 30 | 31 | 32 | 33 | 34 | 35 | 36 | 37 | 38 | 39 | Position | Points |
|---|---|---|---|---|---|---|---|---|---|---|---|---|---|---|---|---|---|---|---|---|---|---|---|---|---|---|---|---|---|---|---|---|---|---|---|---|---|---|---|---|---|---|---|
| 1992 | Benson & Hedges Racing | M3 Evolution II | AMA; R1; 14 | AMA; R2; 5 | SAN; R3; 13 | SAN; R4; 14 | SYM; R5; 10 | SYM; R6; 12 | WIN; R7; 9 | WIN; R8; 7 | LAK; R9; 8 | LAK; R10; 4 | EAS; R11; 9 | EAS; R12; 7 | MAL; R13; 10 | MAL; R14; 10 | BAR; R15; 11 | BAR; R16; 8 | ORA; R17; 7 | ORA; R18; 7 | | | | | | | | | | | | | | | | | | | | | | 9th | 120 |
| 1993 | LoGaMo Racing | BMW E30 M3 Evolution | AMA; R1; 16 | AMA; R2; 9 | SYM; R3; 10 | SYM; R4; 10 | PHI; R5; Ret | PHI; R6; 7 | LAK; R7; 7 | LAK; R8; 7 | WIN; R9; 4 | WIN; R10; 11 | EAS; R11; 8 | EAS; R12; 4 | MAL; R13; 10 | MAL; R14; 10 | BAR; R15; Ret | BAR; R16; DNS | ORA; R17; 13 | ORA; R18; 12 | | | | | | | | | | | | | | | | | | | | | | 16th | 31 |
| 1994 | Diet Coke | Holden VP Commodore | AMA; R1; 6 | AMA; R2; 7 | SAN; R3; 10 | SAN; R4; 8 | SYM; R5; 10 | SYM; R6; 6 | PHI; R7 | PHI; R8 | LAK; R9; 8 | LAK; R10; 5 | WIN; R11; 10 | WIN; R12; 10 | EAS; R13; 9 | EAS; R14; 9 | MAL; R15; 9 | MAL; R16; Ret | BAR; R17; 9 | BAR; R18; 7 | ORA; R19; 9 | ORA; R20; 8 | | | | | | | | | | | | | | | | | | | | 13th | 64 |
| 1999 | Holden Racing Team | Holden VT Commodore | EAS; R1 | EAS; R2 | EAS; R3 | ADE; R4 | BAR; R5 | BAR; R6 | BAR; R7 | PHI; R8 | PHI; R9 | PHI; R10 | HDV; R11 | HDV; R12 | HDV; R13 | SAN; R14 | SAN; R15 | SAN; R16 | QLD; R17 | QLD; R18 | QLD; R19 | CAL; R20 | CAL; R21 | CAL; R22 | SYM; R23 | SYM; R24 | SYM; R25 | WIN; R26 | WIN; R27 | WIN; R28 | ORA; R29 | ORA; R30 | ORA; R31 | QLD; R32; 22 | BAT; R33; 3 | | | | | | | 37th | 300 |
| 2000 | Paul Morris Motorsport | Holden VS Commodore | PHI; R1; 14 | PHI; R2; 18 | BAR; R3; 10 | BAR; R4; 10 | BAR; R5; 8 | ADE; R6; 17 | ADE; R7; 16 | EAS; R8; 15 | EAS; R9; 13 | EAS; R10; 12 | HDV; R11; Ret | HDV; R12; Ret | HDV; R13; 13 | CAN; R14; 20 | CAN; R15; Ret | CAN; R16; 10 | QLD; R17; Ret | QLD; R18; 24 | QLD; R19; 17 | WIN; R20; 18 | WIN; R21; 15 | WIN; R22; 10 | ORA; R23; 15 | ORA; R24; 12 | ORA; R25; Ret | CAL; R26; Ret | CAL; R27; 19 | CAL; R28; 15 | QLD; R29; Ret | SAN; R30; 17 | SAN; R31; 23 | SAN; R32; Ret | BAT; R33; 12 | | | | | | | 19th | 455 |
| 2001 | Paul Morris Motorsport | Holden VT Commodore | PHI; R1; 13 | PHI; R2; 31 | ADE; R3; 14 | ADE; R4; Ret | EAS; R5; 7 | EAS; R6; 13 | HDV; R7; 10 | HDV; R8; Ret | HDV; R9; 25 | CAN; R10; 7 | CAN; R11; 21 | CAN; R12; 11 | BAR; R13; 8 | BAR; R14; 31 | BAR; R15; DNS | CAL; R16; 2 | CAL; R17; 1 | **CAL**; **R18**; **1** | ORA; R19; 15 | ORA; R20; 18 | QLD; R21; 10 | WIN; R22; 6 | WIN; R23; 7 | BAT; R24; 12 | PUK; R25; Ret | PUK; R26; Ret | PUK; R27; DNS | SAN; R28; Ret | SAN; R29; Ret | SAN; R30; 5 | | | | | | | | | | 17th | 1701 |
| 2002 | Paul Morris Motorsport | Holden VT Commodore | ADE; R1; Ret | ADE; R2; 25 | PHI; R3; DNQ | PHI; R4; DNQ | EAS; R5; DNQ | EAS; R6; DNQ | EAS; R7; DNQ | HDV; R8; 20 | HDV; R9; Ret | HDV; R10; Ret | CAN; R11; 25 | CAN; R12; 23 | CAN; R13; 24 | BAR; R14; 14 | BAR; R15; 10 | BAR; R16; 11 | ORA; R17; 14 | ORA; R18; Ret | WIN; R19; Ret | WIN; R20; 16 | QLD; R21; 26 | BAT; R22; Ret | SUR; R23 | SUR; R24 | PUK; R25 | PUK; R26 | PUK; R27 | SAN; R28; 27 | SAN; R29; Ret | | | | | | | | | | | 35th | 190 |
| 2003 | Paul Morris Motorsport | Holden VY Commodore | ADE; R1; 27 | ADE; R1; 20 | PHI; R3; 13 | EAS; R4; 10 | WIN; R5; Ret | BAR; R6; 18 | BAR; R7; Ret | BAR; R8; 20 | HDV; R9; Ret | HDV; R10; 23 | HDV; R11; 30 | QLD; R12; 4 | ORA; R13; Ret | SAN; R14; 13 | BAT; R15; Ret | SUR; R16; 20 | SUR; R17; 19 | PUK; R18; 14 | PUK; R19; 16 | PUK; R20; Ret | EAS; R21; 8 | EAS; R22; 19 | | | | | | | | | | | | | | | | | | 23rd | 1047 |
| 2004 | Paul Morris Motorsport | Holden VY Commodore | ADE; R1; 6 | ADE; R2; 16 | EAS; R3; 11 | PUK; R4; 21 | PUK; R5; 15 | PUK; R6; Ret | HDV; R7; 29 | HDV; R8; 24 | HDV; R9; 15 | BAR; R10; Ret | BAR; R11; 11 | BAR; R12; 26 | QLD; R13; 23 | WIN; R14; 8 | ORA; R15; 13 | ORA; R16; 10 | SAN; R17; 17 | BAT; R18; Ret | SUR; R19; 20 | SUR; R20; 14 | SYM; R21; Ret | SYM; R22; 30 | SYM; R23; 19 | EAS; R24; 29 | EAS; R25; 23 | EAS; R26; 7 | | | | | | | | | | | | | | 22nd | 1071 |
| 2005 | Paul Morris Motorsport | Holden VZ Commodore | ADE; R1; 14 | ADE; R2; 16 | PUK; R3; 9 | PUK; R4; 19 | PUK; R5; 16 | BAR; R6; 10 | BAR; R7; 17 | BAR; R8; 11 | EAS; R9; 11 | EAS; R10; Ret | SHA; R11; 17 | SHA; R12; 22 | SHA; R13; 25 | HDV; R14; 7 | HDV; R15; 18 | HDV; R16; 18 | QLD; R17; 26 | ORA; R18; Ret | ORA; R19; 18 | SAN; R20; 8 | BAT; R21; Ret | SUR; R22; 24 | SUR; R23; 21 | SUR; R24; 25 | SYM; R25; Ret | SYM; R26; 16 | SYM; R27; 13 | PHI; R28; 14 | PHI; R29; 28 | PHI; R30; 13 | | | | | | | | | | 19th | 1059 |
| 2006 | Paul Morris Motorsport | Holden VZ Commodore | ADE; R1; 11 | ADE; R2; 17 | PUK; R3; 14 | PUK; R4; 7 | PUK; R5; 12 | BAR; R6; 19 | BAR; R7; 21 | BAR; R8; 25 | WIN; R9; Ret | WIN; R10; 21 | WIN; R11; Ret | HDV; R12; 19 | HDV; R13; 18 | HDV; R14; Ret | QLD; R15; 25 | QLD; R16; 6 | QLD; R17; 14 | ORA; R18; 20 | ORA; R19; 26 | ORA; R20; 24 | SAN; R21; 8 | BAT; R22; 6 | SUR; R23; 23 | SUR; R24; 18 | SUR; R25; 18 | SYM; R26; 17 | SYM; R27; Ret | SYM; R28; 16 | BHR; R29; 26 | BHR; R30; 18 | BHR; R31; 15 | PHI; R32; 25 | PHI; R33; 27 | PHI; R34; 17 | | | | | | 21st | 1810 |
| 2007 | Paul Morris Motorsport | Holden VE Commodore | ADE; R1; Ret | ADE; R2; 17 | BAR; R3; 15 | BAR; R4; 19 | BAR; R5; 15 | PUK; R6; Ret | PUK; R7; Ret | PUK; R8; Ret | WIN; R9; 8 | WIN; R10; Ret | WIN; R11; Ret | EAS; R12; 17 | EAS; R13; 10 | EAS; R14; 15 | HDV; R15; 12 | HDV; R16; 13 | HDV; R17; 12 | QLD; R18; 12 | QLD; R19; 9 | QLD; R20; 15 | ORA; R21; Ret | ORA; R22; Ret | ORA; R23; 21 | SAN; R24; 15 | BAT; R25; Ret | SUR; R26; Ret | SUR; R27; 25 | SUR; R28; Ret | BHR; R29; Ret | BHR; R30; 23 | BHR; R31; Ret | SYM; R32; Ret | SYM; R33; 21 | SYM; R34; 11 | PHI; R35; Ret | PHI; R36; Ret | PHI; R37; 13 | | | 22nd | 70 |
| 2008 | Paul Morris Motorsport | Holden VE Commodore | ADE; R1; Ret | ADE; R2; 16 | EAS; R3; 18 | EAS; R4; 10 | EAS; R5; Ret | HAM; R6; 24 | HAM; R7; 17 | HAM; R8; 18 | BAR; R9; 16 | BAR; R10; 11 | BAR; R11; 25 | SAN; R12; 15 | SAN; R13; 21 | SAN; R14; 24 | HDV; R15; 20 | HDV; R16; 26 | HDV; R17; 13 | QLD; R18; 27 | QLD; R19; 15 | QLD; R20; Ret | WIN; R21; 13 | WIN; R22; 12 | WIN; R23; 15 | PHI; Q 12 | PHI; R24; 9 | BAT; R25; 18 | SUR; R26; 25 | SUR; R27; 19 | SUR; R28; Ret | BHR; R29; 11 | BHR; R30; 9 | BHR; R31; 12 | SYM; R32; 23 | SYM; R33; 14 | SYM; R34; 13 | ORA; R35; 14 | ORA; R36; 14 | ORA; R37; 9 | | 20th | 1436 |
| 2009 | Paul Morris Motorsport | Holden VE Commodore | ADE; R1 | ADE; R2 | HAM; R3 | HAM; R4 | WIN; R5 | WIN; R6 | SYM; R7 | SYM; R8 | HDV; R9 | HDV; R10 | TOW; R11 | TOW; R12 | SAN; R13 | SAN; R14 | QLD; R15 | QLD; R16 | PHI; Q 19 | PHI; R17; Ret | BAT; R18; 7 | SUR; R19 | SUR; R20 | SUR; R21 | SUR; R22 | PHI; R23 | PHI; R24 | BAR; R25 | BAR; R26 | SYD; R27 | SYD; R28 | | | | | | | | | | | 43rd | 206 |
| 2010 | Paul Morris Motorsport | Holden VE Commodore | YMC; R1; 23 | YMC; R2; DNS | BHR; R3 | BHR; R4 | ADE; R5 | ADE; R6 | HAM; R7 | HAM; R8 | QLD; R9 | QLD; R10 | WIN; R11 | WIN; R12 | HDV; R13 | HDV; R14 | TOW; R15 | TOW; R16 | PHI; R17; 8 | BAT; R18; 8 | SUR; R19 | SUR; R20 | SYM; R21 | SYM; R22 | SAN; R23 | SAN; R24 | SYD; R25 | SYD; R26 | | | | | | | | | | | | | | 40th | 356 |
| 2011 | Paul Morris Motorsport | Holden VE Commodore | YMC; R1 | YMC; R2 | ADE; R3 | ADE; R4 | HAM; R5 | HAM; R6 | BAR; R7 | BAR; R8 | BAR; R9 | WIN; R10 | WIN; R11 | HID; R12 | HID; R13 | TOW; R14 | TOW; R15 | QLD; R16 | QLD; R17 | QLD; R18 | PHI; R19; 15 | BAT; R20; 11 | SUR; R21 | SUR; R22 | SYM; R23 | SYM; R24 | SAN; R25 | SAN; R26 | SYD; R27 | SYD; R28 | | | | | | | | | | | | 41st | 268 |

=== NASCAR Camping World West Series ===
(key) (Bold – Pole position awarded by qualifying time. Italics – Pole position earned by points standings or practice time. * – Most laps led.)

NASCAR Camping World West Series results
| Year | Team | No. | Make | 1 | 2 | 3 | 4 | 5 | 6 | 7 | 8 | 9 | 10 | 11 | 12 | 13 | NCWWSC | Pts | Ref |
|---|---|---|---|---|---|---|---|---|---|---|---|---|---|---|---|---|---|---|---|
| 2008 | Dick Midgley | 09 | Chevrolet | AAS | PHO | CTS | IOW | CNS | SON; 27 | IRW | DCS | EVG | MMP | IRW | AMP | AAS | 71st | 82 | |

=== Stadium Super Trucks ===
(key) (Bold – Pole position. Italics – Fastest qualifier. * – Most laps led.)

Stadium Super Trucks results
| Year | 1 | 2 | 3 | 4 | 5 | 6 | 7 | 8 | 9 | 10 | 11 | 12 | 13 | 14 | 15 | 16 | 17 | 18 | 19 | 20 | 21 | 22 | SSTC | Pts | Ref |
|---|---|---|---|---|---|---|---|---|---|---|---|---|---|---|---|---|---|---|---|---|---|---|---|---|---|
| 2015 | ADE | ADE | ADE | STP | STP | LBH | DET | DET | DET | AUS | TOR | TOR | OCF | OCF | OCF | SRF; 3 | SRF; 5 | SRF; 5 | SRF; 2* | SYD; 5 | LVV | LVV | 11th | 113 | |
| 2016 | ADE; 2 | ADE; 7 | ADE; 9 | STP; 6 | STP; 4 | LBH; 4 | LBH; 10 | DET; 4 | DET; C^{1} | DET; 3 | TOW; 2 | TOW; 3 | TOW; 12 | TOR | TOR | CLT; 4 | CLT; 5 | OCF; 6 | OCF; 11 | SRF; 12 | **SRF**; 10 | SRF; 5 | 4th | 386 | |
| 2017 | ADE; 2 | ADE; 4 | ADE; 1 | STP; 3 | STP; 7 | LBH; 2* | LBH; 4 | PER; 3 | PER; 4 | PER; 9 | DET; 4 | DET; 4 | TEX; 4 | TEX; 9 | HID; 1 | HID; 7 | HID; 1* | BEI; 5 | GLN; 2 | GLN; 3 | ELS; Rpl^{†} | ELS; Rpl^{†} | 1st | 546 | |
| 2018 | ELS; Rpl^{†} | ADE; 8 | ADE; 4 | ADE; 8 | LBH; 10 | LBH; 5 | PER; 3 | PER; 5 | DET; 9 | DET; 10 | TEX; 2 | TEX; 4 | ROA | ROA | SMP; 6 | SMP; 2 | HLN | HLN | MXC | MXC | | | 8th | 249 | |
| 2019 | COA | COA | TEX | TEX | LBH | LBH | TOR | TOR | MOH | MOH | MOH | MOH | ROA | ROA | ROA | POR | POR | SRF; 8 | SRF; 2* | | | | 14th | 38 | |
^{†} – Jerett Brooks drove Morris' truck, points went to Morris

==== Boost Mobile Super Trucks ====
(key) (Bold – Pole position. Italics – Fastest qualifier. * – Most laps led.)

Boost Mobile Super Trucks results
| Year | 1 | 2 | 3 | 4 | 5 | 6 | 7 | 8 | 9 | BMSTC | Pts | Ref |
|---|---|---|---|---|---|---|---|---|---|---|---|---|
| 2020 | ADE; 6 | ADE; 3* | ADE; 5 | | | | | | | N/A^{2} | – | |
| 2021 | **SYM**; 1 | SYM; 1 | SYM; 2 | HID; 1 | HID; 1 | HID; 6 | TOW; 4 | TOW; 6 | TOW; 2 | 1st | 93 | |

^{*} Season in progress.
^{1} The race was abandoned after Matt Mingay suffered serious injuries in a crash on lap three.
^{2} Standings were not recorded by the series for the 2020 season.

Sporting positions
| Preceded by John Bowe; Dick Johnson | Winner of the Bathurst 12 Hour; 2007 (with Craig Baird & Garry Holt) | Succeeded by Graham Alexander; Rod Salmon; Damien White |
| Preceded by Tony Longhurst; Rod Salmon; Damien White | Winner of the Bathurst 12 Hour; 2010 (with Garry Holt & John Bowe) | Succeeded by Marc Basseng; Christopher Mies; Darryl O'Young |
| Preceded by Mark Winterbottom; Steven Richards | Winner of the Bathurst 1000; 2014 (with Chaz Mostert) | Succeeded by Craig Lowndes; Steven Richards |
| Preceded by Sheldon Creed | Stadium Super Trucks Champion; 2017 | Succeeded by Matthew Brabham |
