= 1994 Australian Manufacturers' Championship =

1994 ASTC season

Seasons
- ← 1993 1995 →

The 1994 Australian Manufacturers' Championship was a CAMS sanctioned motor racing competition for 2.0 Litre Touring Cars complying with FIA Class II rules. The championship, which was promoted as the 1994 Valvoline Australian Manufacturers' Championship, began on 17 April 1994 at Eastern Creek Raceway and ended on 28 August at Oran Park Raceway after six rounds. The series determined both the winning automobile manufacturer in the 22nd Australian Manufacturers' Championship and the winning driver in the second annual Australian title for drivers of Class II Touring Cars. This title was awarded as the Australian 2.0 Litre Touring Car Championship in 1993 and as the Australian Super Touring Championship from 1995.

== Teams and drivers ==
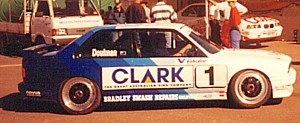
Peter Doulman (BMW M3) at the Lakeside round of the championship

The following teams and drivers competed in the 1994 Australian Manufacturers' Championship.

Team	Manufacturer	Car model	No	Driver
M3 Motorsport	BMW	M3	1	(Australia) Peter Doulman
M3 Motorsport	BMW	M3	2	(Australia) John Cotter
Steven Ellery Racing	Ford	Sierra	6	(Australia) Steve Ellery
Phoenix Motorsport	Peugeot	405 Mi16	8	(Australia) Ken Mathews
Darrell Dixon	Peugeot	405 Mi16	10	(Australia) Phil Alexander
Bob Holden Motors	Toyota	Sprinter AE86	13	(Australia) Dennis Rogers (Australia) Bob Holden
Bob Holden Motors	Toyota	Sprinter AE86	99	(Australia) Mark Adderton (Australia) Justin Mathews
Phil Ward Racing	Mercedes-Benz	190E	015	(Australia) Peter McKay
Phil Ward Racing	Mercedes-Benz	190E	018	(Australia) Phil Ward
Tony Longhurst Racing	BMW	M3	20	(Australia) John Blanchard
Tony Longhurst Racing	BMW	318i	23	(Australia) Paul Morris
Tony Longhurst Racing	BMW	318i	25	(Australia) Tony Longhurst
Campbell Little	Toyota	Carina	21	(New Zealand) Greg Murphy (United Kingdom) James Kaye
Mark Adderton	BMW	M3	97	(Australia) Mark Adderton
Knight Racing	Ford	Sierra	98	(Australia) Peter Hills

== Race calendar ==
The 1994 Australian Manufacturers Championship was contested over a six-round series in four states with two races per round.

Rd.	Race title	Circuit	City / state	Date	Winner	Team	Report
1	(Australia) Eastern Creek	Eastern Creek Raceway	Sydney, New South Wales	16 - 17 Apr	Tony Longhurst	Benson & Hedges Racing	
2	(Australia) Phillip Island	Phillip Island Grand Prix Circuit	Phillip Island, Victoria	21–22 May	Paul Morris	Diet Coke Racing	
3	(Australia) Winton	Winton Motor Raceway	Benalla, Victoria	18 - 19 Jun	Paul Morris	Diet Coke Racing	
4	(Australia) Lakeside	Lakeside International Raceway	Brisbane, Queensland	16 - 17 Jul	Tony Longhurst	Benson & Hedges Racing	
5	(Australia) Mallala	Mallala Motorsport Park	Mallala, South Australia	6 - 7 Aug	Tony Longhurst	Benson & Hedges Racing	
6	(Australia) Oran Park	Oran Park Raceway	Sydney, New South Wales	27 - 28 Aug	Paul Morris	Diet Coke Racing	

== Results ==
=== Manufacturers' Championship ===
Pos	Manufacturer
1	BMW
2	Ford
3	Mercedes-Benz
4	Toyota

=== Drivers Championship ===
Championship points were awarded on a 20-16-14-12-10-8-6-4-2-1 basis for the top ten positions in each race. Round positions were decided by the total points scored over the two races. In the event of two or more drivers having the same points for a round, they were ranked by finishing order in the second race.

Pos	Driver	EAS 1	EAS 2	PHI 1	PHI 2	WIN 1	WIN 2	LAK 1	LAK 2	MAL 1	MAL 2	ORA 1	ORA 2	Pts
1	Tony Longhurst	2nd	1st	1st	3rd	DSQ	DSQ	1st	1st	1st	1st	5th	2nd	176
2	Paul Morris	1st	2nd	2nd	1st	1st	1st	Ret	DNS	Ret	2nd	1st	1st	168
3	John Blanchard	Ret	3rd	5th	2nd	2nd	4th	3rd	2nd	2nd	3rd	3rd	4th	154
4	Phil Ward	4th	5th	Ret	3rd	Ret	5th	Ret	3rd	3rd	4th	2nd	Ret	102
5	Steve Ellery	3rd	4th	4th	DNS	3rd	3rd	DNS	DNS	6th	6th	6th	5th	100
6	Peter Doulman	5th	6th	6th	Ret	4th	6th	4th	Ret	5th	5th	7th	Ret	84
7	Mark Adderton	7th	8th	7th	4th	Ret	DNS	5th	4th	4th	Ret	8th	6th	74
8	Greg Murphy			3rd	Ret					Ret	Ret	4th	3rd	40
8	Justin Mathews			9th	6th	5th	7th	8th	8th	10th	10th	11th	8th	40
10	Bob Holden			8th	7th	6th	Ret	7th	6th	9th	9th	10th	9th	39
11	James Kaye					Ret	2nd	2nd	Ret					32
11	John Cotter	7th	8th			Ret	DNS			8th	7th	9th	7th	32
13	Peter McKay							6th	5th	7th	8th			28
14	Peter Hills	Ret	Ret					Ret	7th			Ret	Ret	6
15	Dennis Rogers	Ret	9th											2
Pos	Driver	EAS 1	EAS 2	PHI 1	PHI 2	WIN 1	WIN 2	LAK 1	LAK 2	MAL 1	MAL 2	ORA 1	ORA 2	Pts

Colour	Result
Gold	Winner
Silver	Second place
Bronze	Third place
Green	Points classification
Blue	Non-points classification
Blue	Non-classified finish (NC)
Purple	Retired, not classified (Ret)
Red	Did not qualify (DNQ)
Red	Did not pre-qualify (DNPQ)
Black	Disqualified (DSQ)
White	Did not start (DNS)
White	Withdrew (WD)
White	Race cancelled (C)
Blank	Did not practice (DNP)
Blank	Did not arrive (DNA)
Blank	Excluded (EX)

== See also ==
1994 Australian Touring Car season
