= M3 Motorsport =

- Manufacturer: BMW; Holden
- Team Principal: John Cotter; Peter Doulman
- Race Drivers: John Cotter (1989-2000); Peter Doulman (1989-2002); Bob McDonald (2002-03)
- Chassis: BMW M3; Holden VP Commodore; Holden VS Commodore; Holden VT Commodore
- Debut: 1989
- Drivers' Championships: 1 (1993)

M3 Motorsport was an Australian motor racing team that competed in Australian touring car racing between 1989 and 2003.

== History ==
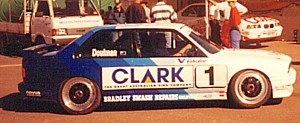
BMW M3 of Peter Doulman in 1994

M3 Motorsport was founded by Sydney club racers John Cotter and Peter Doulman when they purchased a pair of ex Mobil 1 Racing ex JPS BMW M3s in 1989. Debuting at the 1989 Oran Park 300, the team won the under 2.5 litre class at that year's Bathurst 1000. Over the next few years, the team would primarily compete in the Australian Touring Car Championship and AMSCAR rounds at Amaroo Park, Eastern Creek and Oran Park as well as the Bathurst 1000. The cars were prepared at Doulman Automotive, Auburn.

In 1993, the cars were converted to 2 litre specifications with Doulman competing at all nine rounds to win the championship. Cotter and Doulman went on to win the 2 litre class at the 1993 Bathurst 1000. In 1994, Doulman competed in all rounds of the Australian Manufacturers' Championship.

In 1995, M3 Motorsport entered V8 Supercars, after purchasing Larry Perkins' 1994 Holden Commodore VP from Greg Crick, debuting the car at the Bathurst 1000. Over the next few years, M3 Motorsport would compete primarily at East Coast events, picking up Gatorade sponsorship in 1997. In 1999, the team upgraded to an ex Perkins Engineering Commodore VT.

John Cotter last drove for the team in 2000, with the car being driven by Bob McDonald in the Development Series in 2002 and 2003.
