= Gregg Easton =

Australian journalist

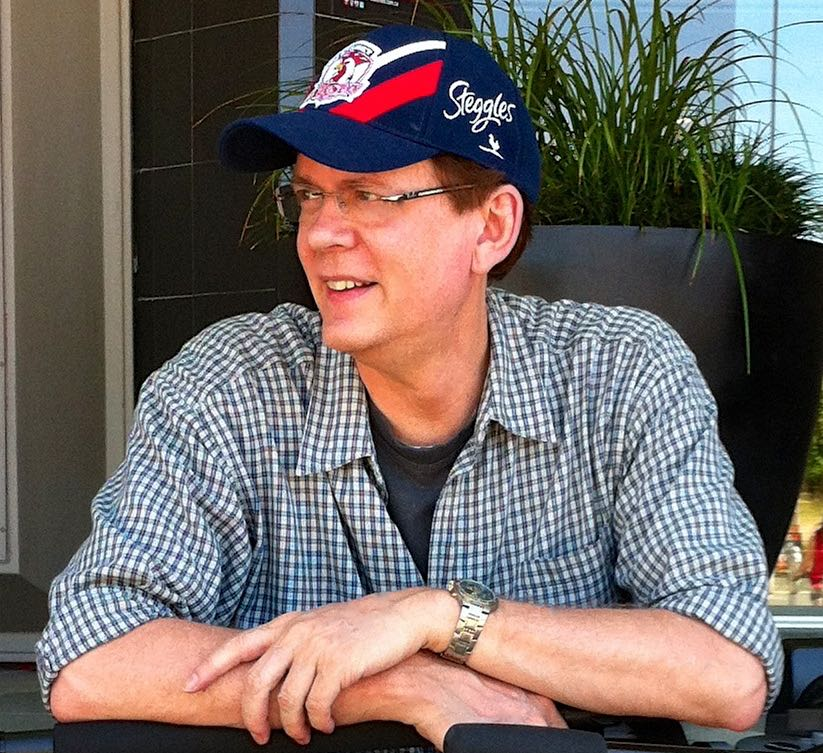
- Easton in 2012 waiting to film a story
- Born: 2 March 1962 (age 64); Sydney, Australia
- Occupations: Media manager, radio and television journalist, broadcaster, and voice-over artist. Race car driver and commentator.
- Known for: Media Broadcasting

Gregg Easton (born 2 March 1962) is an Australian radio and television journalist, broadcaster and voice-over artist. With a professional career spanning more than four decades, he has worked in Sydney, Brisbane, the Gold Coast, Canberra, Wollongong, and Launceston. He worked as a successful nightclub DJ early in his career. He has also been a race car driver, team owner, and commentator, competing in categories such as the Australian Touring Car Championship and Sport Sedans.

== Early years ==
Easton grew up in Sydney and attended The King's School, Parramatta. After completing his Higher School Certificate, he successfully auditioned for Sydney's prestigious Max Rowley Media Academy. By year's end, he began a media cadet-ship at country radio station 3SR in Shepparton.

== Radio Broadcaster ==
In less than a year, Easton moved to major provincial media, commencing at radio 2CC in Canberra. He also began doing voice-overs and presenting at Capital 7 television. In less than three years he began working in metropolitan media after being hired by renowned radio programmer, Ray Bean, to join the on-air line-up at 2WS, in Australia's largest media market – Sydney. However at just 21 years of age, he felt out-of-place with the considerable age gap between him and his fellow 2WS presenters, as well as the station's older music and news format and transferred to 2 Double O in Wollongong, where he also began presenting a weekly afternoon music segment on WIN Television. Easton's biggest influence and idol in radio was Ron E Sparks so when the Sydney radio legend offered him an opportunity to join the on-air lineup at Sydney's 2UW a year later, he jumped at the chance, beginning a three-year stint at the station.

With the launch of World Expo 88 in Brisbane, Easton packed up and headed north to join what was then known as 4BK which broadcast daily live from the Expo site at Brisbane's Southbank. This began an 11-year stint in South East Queensland media, including an involvement with the launch of 90.9 Sea FM on the Gold Coast, followed by on-air stints with Brisbane radio stations 4KQ, B105 and finally Triple M Brisbane.

In 1999, Easton began management training, returning to RG Capital (owners of the Sea FM network), as Assistant Network Program Director and Network Music Director following their recent purchase of a group of Northern Tasmanian radio stations. He moved to Launceston to establish it as the radio network hub for other RG Capital stations located in Devonport, Burnie and Scottsdale. In 2000, Easton completed the Australian Film, Television and Radio School – Radio Program Management Certificate, graduating with a Distinction. The following year he was nominated for an Australian Commercial Radio Award for Best Music Director. He also provided voice-overs for the statewide Southern Cross Television based in Launceston.

In 2003, after two decades, Easton returned to the national capital, joining the on-air line-up at the Capital Radio Network's 2CA as the station's Music Director and eventually Program Director. In 2010, he achieved an Advanced Diploma in Digital Journalism from the Canberra Institute of Technology followed by a further two years of study at the University of Canberra graduating with a Bachelor of Journalism.

== Television Journalism ==
While at university, Easton began a change of media direction becoming involved in television journalism with stints at Southern Cross News and then WIN News for several years. He had a short-lived return to radio in 2016 accepting a position with Grant Broadcasters before choosing to leave later that year. In the years since he continues to work as a digital content and media manager.

In 2020, Easton also successfully launched his popular rock music streaming App - ROQ FM.

== Motor racing ==
Easton grew up riding mini bikes and then motocross from an early age and was a regular attendee at Sydney's former Amaroo Park Raceway. He moved to car racing in the late 1980s competing in Sports Sedans. While working for the Gold Coast's 90.9 Sea FM, Easton used his motor racing knowledge and experience as a commentator for the Gold Coast's Indy Car Race from its inaugural year in 1991 through to 1994.

A dream offer to co-drive a Group A Toyota Corolla in 1992 Sandown 500 followed by the Bathurst 1000 saw Easton compete in the. After purchasing the Corolla the following year, he established Easton Motor Sport, overseeing his own Group A motor-racing team throughout the year, including an entry in the 1993 Bathurst 1000. Expansion of his racing commitments though began to put pressure on his employment with Brisbane radio station 4KQ, who despite the publicity it attracted for the station, had no interest in supporting his motor racing involvement, and he eventually left the station.

In 1994, the Australian Touring Car Championship became an exclusive V8 Category and Easton Motor Sport entered a V8 Commodore for that year's Bathurst 1000. It was his last Bathurst 1000, as from the following year onwards he re-focused on his full-time media career.

In 2000, Easton participated as a driver at a motor-racing event, at Tasmania's Symmons Plains Raceway.

== Private life ==
Easton has been a diehard supporter of the Sydney Roosters National Rugby League team for more than four decades. His younger brother – David is the lead guitarist for the ARIA Award nominated Sydney indie rock band Clouds.
