= Alf Barbagallo =

Australian motoring businessman

- Nationality: Australian
- Born: 3 May 1942 (age 84)

Australian Touring Car Championship
- Years active: 1989–95
- Teams: Barbagallo Motorsport
- Starts: 12
- Wins: 0
- Poles: 0
- Fastest laps: 0
- Best finish: 24th in 1992 Australian Touring Car Championship

Alfredo Barbagallo (born 3 May 1942) is a former racing car driver and businessman in Perth, Western Australia.

Barbagallo won six Western Australian Sprintcar Championships, in 1967–68, 1972–73, 1973–74, 1977–78, 1978–79 and 1981–82. He finished second in 1965–66, 1979–80 and 1982–83. He finished second behind Sydney driver Garry Rush in the 1987 World Sprintcar Championship at Perth's Claremont Speedway. He also finished runner up in the 1980 Australian Sprintcar Championship at Adelaide's Speedway Park.

Wanneroo Raceway was named Barbagallo Raceway between 1992 and 2020 due to Barbagallo's sponsorship.

Barbagallo sells luxury motor vehicles and boats and employs more than 140 people.
