= 2001 V8 Supercars Calder Park round =

2001 Supercar Championship event

(Victoria (state)) 2001 Calder Park V8 Supercar round
Event Information
- Round 7 of 13 in the 2001 Shell Championship Series
- Date: 13–15 July 2001
- Location: Melbourne, Victoria
- Venue: Calder Park Raceway
- Weather: Fine

Results
Race 1
Distance	21 laps	50 km
Pole position	Mark Skaife; Holden Racing Team	56.2277
Winner	Steven Johnson; Dick Johnson Racing	20:11.6398
Race 2
Distance	21 laps	50 km
Winner	Paul Morris; Paul Morris Motorsport	20:19.3653
Race 3
Distance	21 laps	50 km
Winner	Paul Morris; Paul Morris Motorsport	24:45.4588
Round Results
First	Paul Morris; Paul Morris Motorsport	274 pts
Second	Steven Johnson; Dick Johnson Racing	230 pts
Third	Russell Ingall; Perkins Engineering	228 pts

The 2001 Calder Park V8 Supercar round was the seventh round of the 2001 Shell Championship Series. It was held on the weekend of 14 to 15 July at the Calder Park Raceway in Melbourne, Victoria. This would also be the 25th and last time that Calder Park Raceway would host a round of the V8 Supercar Championship Series.

Paul Morris stunned the paddock by winning two out of the three races, and took overall round honours for the first time in his V8 Supercar career. It would be the only wins of Morris' solo V8 Supercar career and marked the last win of a 'driver-owner' combination. Steven Johnson won the first race of the weekend and took second overall for the round in a weekend where the Dick Johnson Racing continued to demonstrate strong pace.

Championship leader Mark Skaife endured a tough weekend after an early penalty in race one left him to climb through the field in the remaining two races. Nonetheless, he would retain his lead in the drivers standings heading into the next round at Oran Park.

== Background ==
The event was held on the weekend of 14 to 15 July 2001. It was the 25th ATCC/V8 Supercar event to be held at Calder Park Raceway, and consisted of three 50 km races. Like the previous round in Perth, there were no compulsory pitstops in any of the races as the sprint format of the weekend meant races barely lasted for over 20 minutes.

Mark Skaife entered the round at the championship leader by 109 points over teammate and nearest competitor, Jason Bright.

The future of Calder Park on the V8 Supercar schedule had been in question on the lead up to the event. Then-AVESCO CEO Wayne Cattach remarked that the circuit would require substantial upgrade works to be undertaken if it were to secure its spot on the calendar for 2002. This included a complete resurface, which Cattach conceded would not be straightforward as a number of braking areas were badly rippled.

=== Entry list ===
There were 37 drivers entered for this round, with a grid capacity of 32. Qualifying would determine which four drivers would be eliminated from racing contention.

Several drivers made their return to the grid. Dean Canto returned with RPM International Racing after having last raced at Darwin, Tyler Mecklem returned with Clive Wiseman Racing after having missed the previous round in Perth, Tomas Mezera returned to Imrie Motorsport after having not raced since Eastern Creek, and Matthew White also returned to the series with is privateer outfit. Phonsy Mullan made the first of his two appearances for 2001 with GM Motorsport.

In terms of technical changes, Dugal McDougall reverted from the VX Commodore to the VT Commodore.

== Race results ==
=== Pre-Qualifying ===
Jason Richards topped the timing sheets despite encountering engine issues on the leadup to the session. John Faulkner, Tyler Mecklem and Phonsy Mullan failed to qualify for the event. Faulkner, a seasoned veteran in the Australian motorsport scene, was particularly upset with the result. After a difficult 2001 season, Faulkner announced he was 'going fishing for a few days' as he left the venue.

Pos	No	Name	Team	Vehicle	Time
1	021	(New Zealand) Jason Richards	Team Kiwi Racing	Holden Commodore (VT)	1:04.1294
2	45	(Australia) Dean Canto	RPM International Racing	Ford Falcon (AU)	1:04.3858
3	14	(Australia) Tomas Mezera	Imrie Motorsport	Holden Commodore (VX)	1:04.5759
4	76	(Australia) Matthew White	Matthew White Racing	Holden Commodore (VS)	1:04.8773
5	75	(Australia) Anthony Tratt	Paul Little Racing	Ford Falcon (AU)	1:04.8781
6	24	(Australia) Paul Romano	Romano Racing	Holden Commodore (VX)	1:05.2597
7	16	(Australia) Dugal McDougall	McDougall Motorsport	Holden Commodore (VT)	1:05.5719
DNPQ	46	(New Zealand) John Faulkner	John Faulkner Racing	Holden Commodore (VT)	1:06.3636
DNPQ	50	(Australia) Tyler Mecklem	Clive Wiseman Racing	Holden Commodore (VT)	1:08.7832
DNPQ	111	(Australia) Phonsy Mullan	GM Motorsport	Holden Commodore (VS)	1:14.2016

=== Qualifying ===
Todd Kelly topped the timesheets to take provisional pole position by four hundredths of a second over Mark Larkham. For Larkham, the performance was a major morale booster after having to severe ties with their title sponsor, Intelligent Card Systems (ICS), over their failure to fulfil contractual payments.

Pos	No	Name	Team	Vehicle	Time
1	15	(Australia) Todd Kelly	Tom Walkinshaw Racing Australia	Holden Commodore (VX)	55.8501
2	10	(Australia) Mark Larkham	Larkham Motorsport	Ford Falcon (AU)	55.8988
3	17	(Australia) Steven Johnson	Dick Johnson Racing	Ford Falcon (AU)	55.9422
4	1	(Australia) Mark Skaife	Holden Racing Team	Holden Commodore (VX)	56.0263
5	51	(New Zealand) Greg Murphy	Tom Walkinshaw Racing Australia	Holden Commodore (VX)	56.0319
6	29	(Australia) Paul Morris	Paul Morris Motorsport	Holden Commodore (VT)	56.0960
7	8	(Australia) Russell Ingall	Perkins Engineering	Holden Commodore (VX)	56.1226
8	4	(Australia) Marcos Ambrose	Stone Brothers Racing	Ford Falcon (AU)	56.1385
9	00	(Australia) Craig Lowndes	Gibson Motorsport	Ford Falcon (AU)	56.1628
10	2	(Australia) Jason Bright	Holden Racing Team	Holden Commodore (VX)	56.1765
11	11	(Australia) Larry Perkins	Perkins Engineering	Holden Commodore (VX)	56.2510
12	18	(New Zealand) Paul Radisich	Dick Johnson Racing	Ford Falcon (AU)	56.3013
13	34	(Australia) Garth Tander	Garry Rogers Motorsport	Holden Commodore (VX)	56.3125
14	3	(Australia) Cameron McConville	Lansvale Racing Team	Holden Commodore (VX)	56.3946
15	6	(New Zealand) Steven Richards	Glenn Seton Racing	Ford Falcon (AU)	56.3957
16	9	(Australia) David Besnard	Stone Brothers Racing	Ford Falcon (AU)	56.4029
17	31	(Australia) Steven Ellery	Steven Ellery Racing	Ford Falcon (AU)	56.4139
18	600	(Australia) John Bowe	Briggs Motorsport	Ford Falcon (AU)	56.4375
19	7	(Australia) Rodney Forbes	Gibson Motorsport	Ford Falcon (AU)	56.4779
20	5	(Australia) Glenn Seton	Glenn Seton Racing	Ford Falcon (AU)	56.4794
21	21	(Australia) Brad Jones	Brad Jones Racing	Ford Falcon (AU)	56.4858
22	40	(Australia) Cameron McLean	Paragon Motorsport	Ford Falcon (AU)	56.5176
23	35	(Australia) Jason Bargwanna	Garry Rogers Motorsport	Holden Commodore (VX)	56.5804
24	54	(Australia) Tony Longhurst	Rod Nash Racing	Holden Commodore (VX)	56.6258
25	43	(Australia) Paul Weel	Paul Weel Racing	Ford Falcon (AU)	56.6347
26	021	(New Zealand) Jason Richards	Team Kiwi Racing	Holden Commodore (VT)	56.8959
27	45	(Australia) Dean Canto	RPM International Racing	Ford Falcon (AU)	56.9471
28	75	(Australia) Anthony Tratt	Paul Little Racing	Ford Falcon (AU)	56.9784
29	16	(Australia) Dugal McDougall	McDougall Motorsport	Holden Commodore (VT)	57.0472
30	24	(Australia) Paul Romano	Romano Racing	Holden Commodore (VX)	57.0808
31	14	(Australia) Tomas Mezera	Imrie Motorsport	Holden Commodore (VX)	57.2623
32	76	(Australia) Matthew White	Matthew White Racing	Holden Commodore (VS)	57.5664

=== Top Ten Shootout ===
Mark Skaife took pole position, setting a time just seven hundredths of a second faster than Steven Johnson. Paul Morris completed a time good enough for third position; his best qualifying position yet in his V8 Supercar career. Greg Murphy expressed dissatisfaction with his time after missing a gear, dropping him the fifth row of the grid.

Pos	No	Name	Team	Vehicle	Time
1	1	(Australia) Mark Skaife	Holden Racing Team	Holden Commodore (VX)	56.2277
2	17	(Australia) Steven Johnson	Dick Johnson Racing	Ford Falcon (AU)	56.2902
3	29	(Australia) Paul Morris	Paul Morris Motorsport	Holden Commodore (VT)	56.4524
4	15	(Australia) Todd Kelly	Tom Walkinshaw Racing Australia	Holden Commodore (VX)	56.4689
5	4	(Australia) Marcos Ambrose	Stone Brothers Racing	Ford Falcon (AU)	56.5185
6	10	(Australia) Mark Larkham	Larkham Motorsport	Ford Falcon (AU)	56.5663
7	8	(Australia) Russell Ingall	Perkins Engineering	Holden Commodore (VX)	56.6394
8	00	(Australia) Craig Lowndes	Gibson Motorsport	Ford Falcon (AU)	56.7190
9	2	(Australia) Jason Bright	Holden Racing Team	Holden Commodore (VX)	56.7829
10	51	(New Zealand) Greg Murphy	Tom Walkinshaw Racing Australia	Holden Commodore (VX)	57.2326

=== Race 1 ===
As the threat of rain loomed, the race was immediately thrown into controversy. Steven Johnson led into turn one but experienced a loss of rear grip on entry. The sudden deceleration to catch a potential spin caught out the driver behind him, Mark Skaife. The two made contact that was sufficient to allow Skaife to squeeze by and assume the lead. The stewards deemed this maneuver to be illegal and issued Skaife a stop-go penalty that threw him to the very end of the pack, much to the ire of the Holden Racing Team crew. Mark Larkham spun Greg Murphy at turn one however this incident did not draw the attention of the stewards. The Team Kiwi Racing entry of Jason Richards failed to launch off the line after the differential failed. Todd Kelly would have to pit to replaced a tyre damaged on the first lap.

"Steven [Johnson] ran wide by himself. I ended up the inside of him – there's hardly a mark on the car. I mean, compared to other first corner incidents, it's a walk in the park. I'm certainly going to be having a chat to the boys about that one – that's an absolute joke."

— Mark Skaife on his race one penalty

Johnson established a healthy margin over nearest competitor, Paul Morris. In an effort to climb back through the pack, Murphy and Paul Romano made side-to-side contact on the approach to the final corner that saw the Holden Young Lions Commodore spin to the rear of the field. John Bowe retired from the race after one lap due to engine problems. The field compromised over numerous competitive battles that were compounded by the difficulty of passing on the Calder circuit. Such was the struggle to overtake that Skaife contemplated retiring from the race to preserve the tyres. The Holden Racing Team elected not to do so and Skaife conserved his tyres for the two races that lay ahead.

The race remained relatively stagnant to the flag. Johnson cruised home comfortably to take his second win of the year and continued Dick Johnson Racing's run of form. Morris enjoyed a quiet run to second place while Russell Ingall rounded out the podium. Multiple drivers made notable strides through the field. This included Johnson's teammate, Paul Radisich, who had demonstrated considerable pace throughout proceedings.

==== Results ====
Pos	No	Driver	Team	Car	Laps	Time	Grid
1	17	(Australia) Steven Johnson	Dick Johnson Racing	Ford Falcon (AU)	21	20min 11.6398sec	2
2	29	(Australia) Paul Morris	Paul Morris Motorsport	Holden Commodore (VT)	21	+ 3.78	3
3	4	(Australia) Marcos Ambrose	Stone Brothers Racing	Ford Falcon (AU)	21	+ 5.26	5
4	8	(Australia) Russell Ingall	Perkins Engineering	Holden Commodore (VX)	21	+ 5.37	7
5	18	(New Zealand) Paul Radisich	Dick Johnson Racing	Ford Falcon (AU)	21	+ 6.03	12
6	2	(Australia) Jason Bright	Holden Racing Team	Holden Commodore (VX)	21	+ 6.99	9
7	9	(Australia) David Besnard	Stone Brothers Racing	Ford Falcon (AU)	21	+ 12.92	16
8	31	(Australia) Steven Ellery	Steven Ellery Racing	Ford Falcon (AU)	21	+ 13.29	17
9	6	(New Zealand) Steven Richards	Glenn Seton Racing	Ford Falcon (AU)	21	+ 17.81	15
10	34	(Australia) Garth Tander	Garry Rogers Motorsport	Holden Commodore (VX)	21	+ 18.41	13
11	3	(Australia) Cameron McConville	Lansvale Racing Team	Holden Commodore (VX)	21	+ 19.74	14
12	35	(Australia) Jason Bargwanna	Garry Rogers Motorsport	Holden Commodore (VX)	21	+ 19.86	23
13	00	(Australia) Craig Lowndes	Gibson Motorsport	Ford Falcon (AU)	21	+ 20.41	8
14	11	(Australia) Larry Perkins	Perkins Engineering	Holden Commodore (VX)	21	+ 20.60	11
15	7	(Australia) Rodney Forbes	Gibson Motorsport	Ford Falcon (AU)	21	+ 21.15	19
16	10	(Australia) Mark Larkham	Larkham Motorsport	Ford Falcon (AU)	21	+ 21.33	6
17	51	(New Zealand) Greg Murphy	Tom Walkinshaw Racing Australia	Holden Commodore (VX)	21	+ 25.36	10
18	21	(Australia) Brad Jones	Brad Jones Racing	Ford Falcon (AU)	21	+ 26.37	21
19	5	(Australia) Glenn Seton	Glenn Seton Racing	Ford Falcon (AU)	21	+ 29.46	20
20	54	(Australia) Tony Longhurst	Rod Nash Racing	Holden Commodore (VX)	21	+ 29.93	24
21	40	(Australia) Cameron McLean	Paragon Motorsport	Ford Falcon (AU)	21	+ 30.08	22
22	43	(Australia) Paul Weel	Paul Weel Racing	Ford Falcon (AU)	21	+ 31.49	25
23	75	(Australia) Anthony Tratt	Paul Little Racing	Ford Falcon (AU)	21	+ 33.31	28
24	16	(Australia) Dugal McDougall	McDougall Motorsport	Holden Commodore (VT)	21	+ 37.27	29
25	1	(Australia) Mark Skaife	Holden Racing Team	Holden Commodore (VX)	21	+ 40.89	1
26	14	(Australia) Tomas Mezera	Imrie Motorsport	Holden Commodore (VX)	21	+ 42.21	31
27	76	(Australia) Matthew White	Matthew White Racing	Holden Commodore (VS)	21	+ 42.52	32
28	24	(Australia) Paul Romano	Romano Racing	Holden Commodore (VX)	21	+ 50.95	30
29	15	(Australia) Todd Kelly	Tom Walkinshaw Racing Australia	Holden Commodore (VX)	20	+ 1 lap	4
Ret	600	(Australia) John Bowe	Briggs Motorsport	Ford Falcon (AU)	1	Engine	18
Ret	021	(New Zealand) Jason Richards	Team Kiwi Racing	Holden Commodore (VT)	0	Differential	26
DNS	45	(Australia) Dean Canto	RPM International Racing	Ford Falcon (AU)		Did not start	
DNS	46	(New Zealand) John Faulkner	John Faulkner Racing	Holden Commodore (VT)		Did not start	
DNS	50	(Australia) Tyler Mecklem	Clive Wiseman Racing	Holden Commodore (VT)		Did not start	
DNS	84	(Australia) Daniel Miller	Miller Racing	Holden Commodore (VS)		Did not start	
DNS	111	(Australia) Phonsy Mullan	GM Motorsport	Holden Commodore (VS)		Did not start	
Fastest Lap: Mark Skaife (Holden Racing Team) - 0:56.5437 on lap 4

=== Race 2 ===
Johnson suffered a sluggish start that saw him lose several positions on the run down to turn one. Morris assumed the lead with Ingall in a close second. As in race one, Todd Kelly suffered damage to the front-right guard on lap one which cut into the tyre and relegated him into the pitlane. Jason Bargwanna suffered a front-left tyre delamination and lost two laps in the process of replacing the tyre. Brad Jones retired on lap five after the front-left suspension failed on the approach to turn one.

Merely halfway into the race, Morris began to defend the inside line against Ingall. This drew the attention of the stewards who, on lap 14, issued Morris with a bad sportsmanship flag for excessive blocking. Nevertheless, Morris persisted with the inside line and made overtaking into turn one virtually impossible for those behind. Curiously, despite this, the stewards elected not to penalise Morris further. The gap began to fluctuate as Morris' top end speed made it difficult for those behind to get a run on him. Murphy was spun at the final corner and lost a half dozen positions in the process.

After warding off an early attack, Morris took his first win in the V8 Supercar category with Ingall in second and Jason Bright in third.

Pos	No	Driver	Team	Car	Laps	Time	Grid
1	29	(Australia) Paul Morris	Paul Morris Motorsport	Holden Commodore (VT)	21	20min 19.3653sec	2
2	8	(Australia) Russell Ingall	Perkins Engineering	Holden Commodore (VX)	21	+ 0.34	4
3	2	(Australia) Jason Bright	Holden Racing Team	Holden Commodore (VX)	21	+ 1.06	6
4	18	(New Zealand) Paul Radisich	Dick Johnson Racing	Ford Falcon (AU)	21	+ 1.36	5
5	4	(Australia) Marcos Ambrose	Stone Brothers Racing	Ford Falcon (AU)	21	+ 4.41	3
6	17	(Australia) Steven Johnson	Dick Johnson Racing	Ford Falcon (AU)	21	+ 4.74	1
7	6	(New Zealand) Steven Richards	Glenn Seton Racing	Ford Falcon (AU)	21	+ 7.04	9
8	34	(Australia) Garth Tander	Garry Rogers Motorsport	Holden Commodore (VX)	21	+ 7.51	10
9	31	(Australia) Steven Ellery	Steven Ellery Racing	Ford Falcon (AU)	21	+ 8.14	8
10	3	(Australia) Cameron McConville	Lansvale Racing Team	Holden Commodore (VX)	21	+ 8.39	11
11	1	(Australia) Mark Skaife	Holden Racing Team	Holden Commodore (VX)	21	+ 11.42	25
12	11	(Australia) Larry Perkins	Perkins Engineering	Holden Commodore (VX)	21	+ 14.84	14
13	10	(Australia) Mark Larkham	Larkham Motorsport	Ford Falcon (AU)	21	+ 15.07	16
14	51	(New Zealand) Greg Murphy	Tom Walkinshaw Racing Australia	Holden Commodore (VX)	21	+ 15.16 s	17
15	00	(Australia) Craig Lowndes	Gibson Motorsport	Ford Falcon (AU)	21	+ 16.95	13
16	9	(Australia) David Besnard	Stone Brothers Racing	Ford Falcon (AU)	21	+ 17.91	7
17	7	(Australia) Rodney Forbes	Gibson Motorsport	Ford Falcon (AU)	21	+ 20.40	15
18	600	(Australia) John Bowe	Briggs Motorsport	Ford Falcon (AU)	21	+ 20.54	30
19	43	(Australia) Paul Weel	Paul Weel Racing	Ford Falcon (AU)	21	+ 23.26	22
20	54	(Australia) Tony Longhurst	Rod Nash Racing	Holden Commodore (VX)	21	+ 23.65	20
21	40	(Australia) Cameron McLean	Paragon Motorsport	Ford Falcon (AU)	21	+ 26.86	21
22	75	(Australia) Anthony Tratt	Paul Little Racing	Ford Falcon (AU)	21	+ 31.18	23
23	021	(New Zealand) Jason Richards	Team Kiwi Racing	Holden Commodore (VT)	21	+ 31.69	31
24	45	(Australia) Dean Canto	RPM International Racing	Ford Falcon (AU)	21	+ 32.67	32
25	5	(Australia) Glenn Seton	Glenn Seton Racing	Ford Falcon (AU)	21	+ 34.10	19
26	14	(Australia) Tomas Mezera	Imrie Motorsport	Holden Commodore (VX)	21	+ 34.94	26
27	16	(Australia) Dugal McDougall	McDougall Motorsport	Holden Commodore (VT)	21	+ 40.98	24
28	24	(Australia) Paul Romano	Romano Racing	Holden Commodore (VX)	21	+ 42.90	28
29	35	(Australia) Jason Bargwanna	Garry Rogers Motorsport	Holden Commodore (VX)	19	+ 2 laps	12
30	76	(Australia) Matthew White	Matthew White Racing	Holden Commodore (VS)	19	+ 2 laps	27
Ret	21	(Australia) Brad Jones	Brad Jones Racing	Ford Falcon (AU)	5	Suspension	18
Ret	15	(Australia) Todd Kelly	Tom Walkinshaw Racing Australia	Holden Commodore (VX)	3	Suspension	29
DNS	46	(New Zealand) John Faulkner	John Faulkner Racing	Holden Commodore (VT)		Did not start	
DNS	50	(Australia) Tyler Mecklem	Clive Wiseman Racing	Holden Commodore (VT)		Did not start	
DNS	84	(Australia) Daniel Miller	Miller Racing	Holden Commodore (VS)		Did not start	
DNS	111	(Australia) Phonsy Mullan	GM Motorsport	Holden Commodore (VS)		Did not start	
Fastest Lap: Greg Murphy (Tom Walkinshaw Racing Australia) - 0:56.6920 on lap 6

=== Race 3 ===
Morris retained his lead from pole position while Paul Radisich leapt from the second row to nestle in behind Morris. He began to establish a lead in the opening portion of the race in anticipation of a mid-race slump in pace. At turn six on the opening lap, Larry Perkins was sent into a spin by Bowe and promptly t-boned by Jason Richards. Further up the road, Rodney Forbes and Anthony Tratt came to blows while at the same time, Cameron McLean was catapulted into the wall by Dean Canto. In all these incidents, Perkins, Tratt and McLean would immediately retire from the race. Forbes cycled around with damage to the right-rear guard and Canto would also pit to amend damage to the front end of his Falcon.

The safety car was called to retrieve the grief-stricken cars and Morris' advantage that he had built up over the first couple of laps was instantly vapourised. The race resumed on lap seven and Morris struggled to shake a persistent Radisich. He began to defend aggressively as per race two and the queue behind began to lengthen. David Besnard was spun around at turn seven by Bargwanna and was sent to the rear of all the lead-lap runners. Forbes day went from bad to worse when he spun off at turn six with a handful of laps remaining.

"It's been a tough year and a half, and to get up there and to have a win – and win the whole day – is just unbelievable."

— Paul Morris on his first round victory in V8 Supercars

After enduring a difficult race one, both Greg Murphy and Mark Skaife found themselves in the top ten. Both drivers found themselves locked in combat with Garth Tander and in his eagerness to find a way past, Skaife locked the rear brakes into turn one and lost ten positions. Despite showing great pace, Radisich could not find a way past Morris. The Big Kev Racing Commodore maintained the lead to the finish, taking his second win of the weekend and the overall round honours to boot. Radisich and Ingall rounded out the podium. Morris' win marked the last of a 'driver-owner' combination and it would turn out to be his sole wins in the category in the solo format.

Pos	No	Driver	Team	Car	Laps	Time	Grid
1	29	(Australia) Paul Morris	Paul Morris Motorsport	Holden Commodore (VT)	21	20min 45.4588sec	1
2	18	(New Zealand) Paul Radisich	Dick Johnson Racing	Ford Falcon (AU)	21	+ 0.15	4
3	8	(Australia) Russell Ingall	Perkins Engineering	Holden Commodore (VX)	21	+ 0.37	2
4	17	(Australia) Steven Johnson	Dick Johnson Racing	Ford Falcon (AU)	21	+ 0.63	6
5	2	(Australia) Jason Bright	Holden Racing Team	Holden Commodore (VX)	21	+ 0.89	3
6	31	(Australia) Steven Ellery	Steven Ellery Racing	Ford Falcon (AU)	21	+ 1.16	9
7	34	(Australia) Garth Tander	Garry Rogers Motorsport	Holden Commodore (VX)	21	+ 1.86	8
8	51	(New Zealand) Greg Murphy	Tom Walkinshaw Racing Australia	Holden Commodore (VX)	21	+ 2.14	14
9	4	(Australia) Marcos Ambrose	Stone Brothers Racing	Ford Falcon (AU)	21	+ 3.65	5
10	6	(New Zealand) Steven Richards	Glenn Seton Racing	Ford Falcon (AU)	21	+ 4.27	7
11	3	(Australia) Cameron McConville	Lansvale Racing Team	Holden Commodore (VX)	21	+ 4.69	10
12	10	(Australia) Mark Larkham	Larkham Motorsport	Ford Falcon (AU)	21	+ 7.59	13
13	600	(Australia) John Bowe	Briggs Motorsport	Ford Falcon (AU)	21	+ 8.78	18
14	00	(Australia) Craig Lowndes	Gibson Motorsport	Ford Falcon (AU)	21	+ 13.18	15
15	21	(Australia) Brad Jones	Brad Jones Racing	Ford Falcon (AU)	21	+ 14.23	31
16	5	(Australia) Glenn Seton	Glenn Seton Racing	Ford Falcon (AU)	21	+ 15.78	25
17	35	(Australia) Jason Bargwanna	Garry Rogers Motorsport	Holden Commodore (VX)	21	+ 16.29	29
18	1	(Australia) Mark Skaife	Holden Racing Team	Holden Commodore (VX)	21	+ 17.95	11
19	54	(Australia) Tony Longhurst	Rod Nash Racing	Holden Commodore (VX)	21	+ 19.99	20
20	43	(Australia) Paul Weel	Paul Weel Racing	Ford Falcon (AU)	21	+ 21.62	19
21	15	(Australia) Todd Kelly	Tom Walkinshaw Racing Australia	Holden Commodore (VX)	21	+ 21.80	32
22	14	(Australia) Tomas Mezera	Imrie Motorsport	Holden Commodore (VX)	21	+ 27.82	26
23	76	(Australia) Matthew White	Matthew White Racing	Holden Commodore (VS)	21	+ 29.10	30
24	021	(New Zealand) Jason Richards	Team Kiwi Racing	Holden Commodore (VT)	21	+ 32.25	23
25	24	(Australia) Paul Romano	Romano Racing	Holden Commodore (VX)	21	+ 34.86	28
26	9	(Australia) David Besnard	Stone Brothers Racing	Ford Falcon (AU)	21	+ 35.83	16
27	45	(Australia) Dean Canto	RPM International Racing	Ford Falcon (AU)	20	+ 1 lap	24
28	7	(Australia) Rodney Forbes	Gibson Motorsport	Ford Falcon (AU)	19	+ 2 laps	17
Ret	75	(Australia) Anthony Tratt	Paul Little Racing	Ford Falcon (AU)	0	Accident	22
Ret	11	(Australia) Larry Perkins	Perkins Engineering	Holden Commodore (VX)	0	Accident	12
Ret	40	(Australia) Cameron McLean	Paragon Motorsport	Ford Falcon (AU)	0	Accident	21
Ret	16	(Australia) Dugal McDougall	McDougall Motorsport	Holden Commodore (VT)	0	Retired	27
DNS	46	(New Zealand) John Faulkner	John Faulkner Racing	Holden Commodore (VT)		Did not start	
DNS	50	(Australia) Tyler Mecklem	Clive Wiseman Racing	Holden Commodore (VT)		Did not start	
DNS	84	(Australia) Daniel Miller	Miller Racing	Holden Commodore (VS)		Did not start	
DNS	111	(Australia) Phonsy Mullan	GM Motorsport	Holden Commodore (VS)		Did not start	
Fastest Lap: Mark Skaife (Holden Racing Team) - 0:56.5377 on lap 9

== Championship points ==
Round points tally

Pos.	No	Driver	Team	Pts
1	29	(Australia) Paul Morris	Paul Morris Motorsport	274
2	17	(Australia) Steven Johnson	Dick Johnson Racing	230
3	8	(Australia) Russell Ingall	Perkins Engineering	228
4	18	(New Zealand) Paul Radisich	Dick Johnson Racing	208
5	2	(Australia) Jason Bright	Holden Racing Team	200

Drivers' Championship standings after Round 7

Pos.	No	Driver	Team	Pts
1	1	(Australia) Mark Skaife	Holden Racing Team	1720
2	2	(Australia) Jason Bright	Holden Racing Team	1703
3	8	(Australia) Russell Ingall	Perkins Engineering	1496
4	17	(Australia) Steven Johnson	Dick Johnson Racing	1488
5	4	(Australia) Marcos Ambrose	Stone Brothers Racing	1262
