= 1990 Australian Touring Car season =

Seasons
- ← 1989 1991 →

The 1990 Australian Touring Car season was the 31st year of touring car racing in Australia since the first runnings of the Australian Touring Car Championship and the fore-runner of the present day Bathurst 1000, the Armstrong 500.

There were 12 touring car race meetings held during 1990; an eight-round series, the 1990 Australian Touring Car Championship (ATCC); a support programme event at the 1990 Australian Grand Prix and a three-round series of long-distance races, nicknamed 'enduros', which counted towards both the 1990 Australian Endurance Championship and the 1990 Australian Manufacturers' Championship.

== Season review ==
After two years domination by Dick Johnson Racings Ford Sierras, 1990 was to prove much of an upset year with race victories spread across seven teams with Nissan and Holden teams taking wins off the massed privateer Ford teams. The arrival of the 4WD, twin turbo Nissan Skyline GT-R towards the end of the Australian Touring Car Championship was enough for Jim Richards to take Nissan's first title in a four driver showdown again Ford Sierra threesome, Dick Johnson, Peter Brock and the surprising Colin Bond who had won the Lakeside and Mallala rounds of the ATCC. Glenn Seton took his first race wins as a team owner beginning with the Sandown 500, while the Holden Racing Team took a memorable Bathurst win for Win Percy and Allan Grice outlasting the GT-R and the pack of tyre frying Sierras on a day of attrition. Larry Perkins underlined Holden's return to form by winning Eastern Creek Raceways first major touring car race at the end of the season.

== Results and standings ==
=== Race calendar ===
The 1990 Australian touring car season consisted of 12 events.

Date	Series	Circuit	City / state	Winner	Team	Car	Report
25 Feb	ATCC Round 1	Amaroo Park	Sydney, New South Wales	Jim Richards	Nissan Motorsport Australia	Nissan Skyline HR31 GTS-R	
11 Mar	ATCC Round 2	Symmons Plains Raceway	Launceston, Tasmania	Dick Johnson	Shell Ultra-Hi Racing	Ford Sierra RS500	
25 Mar	ATCC Round 3	Phillip Island Grand Prix Circuit	Phillip Island, Victoria	Dick Johnson	Shell Ultra-Hi Racing	Ford Sierra RS500	
8 Apr	ATCC Round 4	Winton Motor Raceway	Benalla, Victoria	Jim Richards	Nissan Motorsport Australia	Nissan Skyline HR31 GTS-R	
6 May	ATCC Round 5	Lakeside International Raceway	Brisbane, Queensland	Colin Bond	Caltex CXT Racing	Ford Sierra RS500	
10 Jun	ATCC Round 6	Mallala Motor Sport Park	Mallala, South Australia	Colin Bond	Caltex CXT Racing	Ford Sierra RS500	
24 Jun	ATCC Round 7	Barbagallo Raceway	Perth, Western Australia	Peter Brock	Mobil 1 Racing	Ford Sierra RS500	
15 Jul	ATCC Round 8	Oran Park Raceway	Sydney, New South Wales	Jim Richards	Nissan Motorsport Australia	Nissan Skyline R32 GT-R	
9 Sep	Sandown 500 AEC Round 1	Sandown International Raceway	Melbourne, Victoria	Glenn Seton; George Fury	Peter Jackson Racing	Ford Sierra RS500	report
30 Sep	Tooheys 1000 AEC Round 2	Mount Panorama Circuit	Bathurst, New South Wales	Win Percy; Allan Grice	Holden Racing Team	Holden VL Commodore SS Group A SV	report
3-4 Nov	Ansett Air Freight Challenge	Adelaide Street Circuit	Adelaide, South Australia	Glenn Seton	Peter Jackson Racing	Ford Sierra RS500	
10 Nov	Nissan Sydney 500 AEC Round 3	Eastern Creek Raceway	Sydney, New South Wales	Larry Perkins; Tomas Mezera	Perkins Engineering	Holden VL Commodore SS Group A SV	report

=== Ansett Air Freight Challenge ===
The Ansett Air Freight Challenge was a support event at the 1990 Australian Grand Prix meeting. Nissan Motorsport Australia had intended to run two of the new 4WD, twin-turbo Nissan Skyline R32 GT-R's at the meeting, but were reduced to just one car after Mark Skaife rolled his GT-R at Brewery Bend (turn 10) during practice.

Driver	No.	Team	Car	Race 1	Race 2
(Australia) Glenn Seton	30	Peter Jackson Racing	Ford Sierra RS500	3	1
(Australia) Dick Johnson	17	Shell Ultra Hi Racing	Ford Sierra RS500	6	2
(United Kingdom) Win Percy	16	Holden Racing Team	Holden VL Commodore SS Group A SV	DNF	3
(Australia) Alan Jones	20	Benson & Hedges Racing	Ford Sierra RS500	4	4
(United Kingdom) Chris Lambden	23	Beaurepaires	Nissan Skyline HR31 GTS-R	8	5
(Australia) Wayne Park	29	Wayne Park	Holden VL Commodore SS Group A SV	7	6
(Australia) Ray Lintott	12	Ray Lintott	Ford Sierra RS500	10	7
(Australia) Joe Sommariva	28	Joe Sommariva	Holden VL Commodore SS Group A SV	11	8
(New Zealand) John Faulkner	71	Toyota Team Australia	Toyota Corolla FX-GT	14	9
(Australia) Murray Carter	14	Netcomm	Ford Sierra RS500	17	10
(Australia) Peter Brock	05	Mobil 1 Racing	Ford Sierra RS500	DNF	DNF
(Australia) Colin Bond	8	Caltex CXT Racing	Ford Sierra RS500	5	DNF
(Australia) Tony Longhurst	25	Benson & Hedges Racing	Ford Sierra RS500	DNF	DNF
(Australia) John Bowe	18	Shell Ultra Hi Racing	Ford Sierra RS500	2	DNF
(New Zealand) Jim Richards	2	Nissan Motorsport Australia	Nissan Skyline R32 GT-R	1	DNF
(Australia) Phil Ward	51	Phil Ward Racing	Mercedes-Benz 190E	9	
(Australia) Mark Skaife	3	Nissan Motorsport Australia	Nissan Skyline R32 GT-R	DNS	DNS
