= 1985 Motorcraft Formula Ford Driver to Europe Series =

The 1985 Motorcaft Formula Ford Driver to Europe Series was an Australian motor racing competition open to Formula Ford racing cars. It was the 16th Australian Formula Ford Series and the first to be contested under the Motorcaft Formula Ford Driver to Europe Series name.

The series was won by Tomas Mezera driving a Reynard.

== Calendar ==
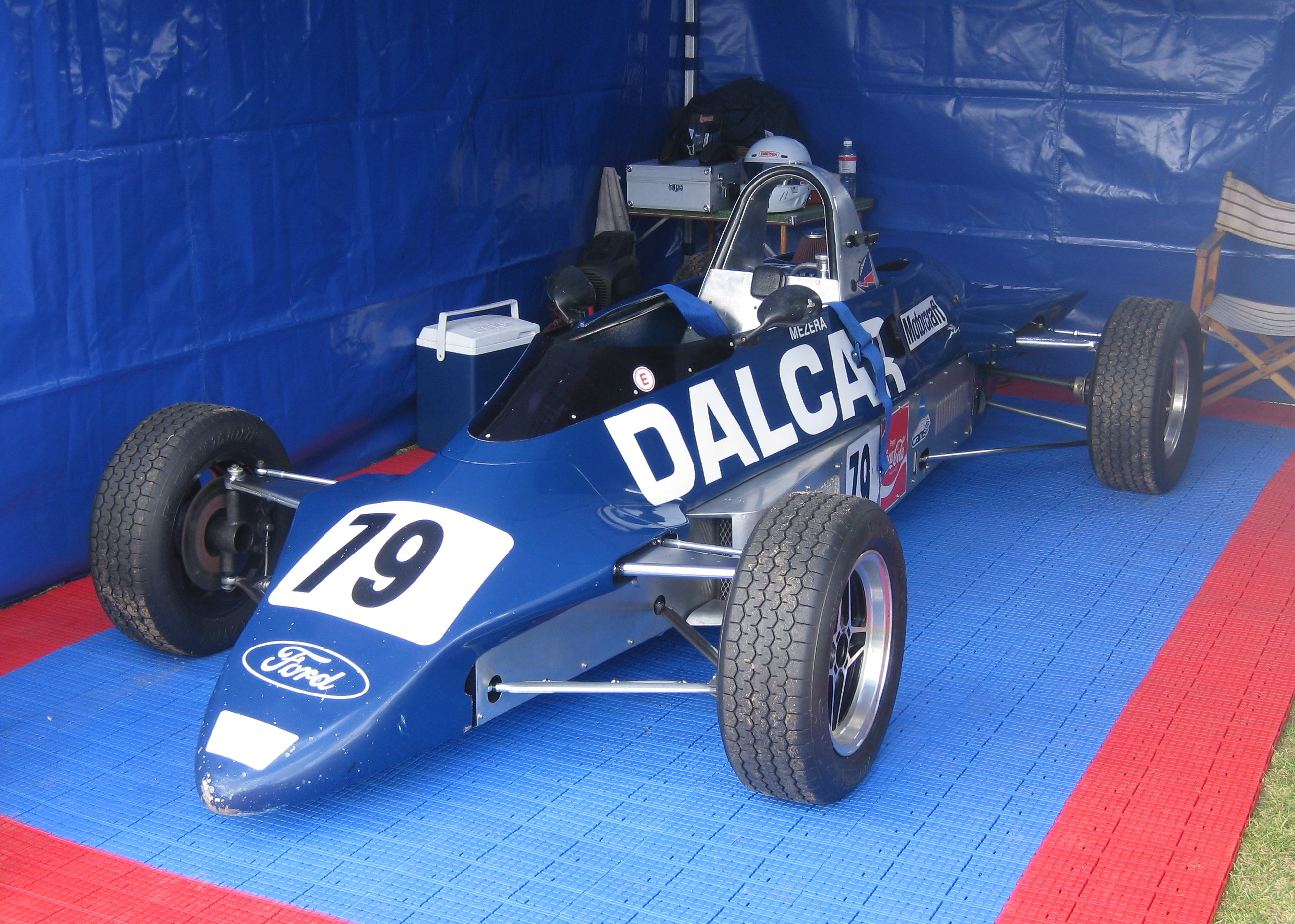
The Reynard FF83 of series winner Tomas Mezera. The car is pictured, in 2011, in its 1985 livery

The series was contested over nine rounds with one race per round.

Round	Circuit	Date	Round winner	Car
1	Sandown	24 February	Tomas Mezera	Reynard FF83
2	Mallala Motor Sport Park	17 March	Tomas Mezera	Reynard FF83
3	Surfers Paradise		N/A	N/A
4	Amaroo Park		Tomas Mezera	Reynard FF83
5	Oran Park	14 July	Tomas Mezera	Reynard FF83
6	Calder Park	11 August	Tomas Mezera	Reynard FF83
7	Winton	1 September	Tomas Mezera	Elwyn 003
8	Sandown	15 September	Geoff Walters	Elwyn 003
9	Oran Park	22 September	Richard Carter	Matek M1

Round 3 was declared a "non-event" after all drivers were excluded from the results for failing to slow sufficiently following an accident.

== Points system ==
Points were awarded on a 20-15-12-10-8-6-4-3-2-1 basis for the first ten positions at each round.

== Series standings ==
Position	Driver	Car	Entrant	San	Mal	Sur	Ama	Ora	Cal	Win	San	Ora	Total
1	Tomas Mezera	Reynard FF83; Elwyn 003	Dalcar Industries	20	20	-	20	20	20	20	-	-	120
2	Geoff Walters	Elwyn 003	Logan Homes	15	15	-	15	1	10	4	20	15	95
3	Andrew Burden	Lola T624A	Bob Holden Motors	10	10	-	-	12	6	1-	-	12	60
4	Roger Martin	PRS-02	Roger Martin Racing	8	6	-	1	15	12	15	-	-	57
5	Alan Bisset	Reynard	Alan Bisset	-	12	-	4	8	15	12	-	-	51
6	Bradley Forgeard	Van Diemen	Bradley Forgeard	12	-	-	10	-	-	8	-	10	40
7	Barry Ward	Galloway	The Motor Shed	-	8	-	6	6	2	-	15	-	37
8	Richard Carter	Matek M1		-	-	-	12	2	-	-	-	20	34
9	David Stanley	Elwyn 004	J. Crouchley	-	-	-	8	10	0	0	0	8	26
10	Stephen Moody	Totem BM1	Stephen Moody	-	4	-	-	-	-	-	12	3	19
=11	Laurie Bennett	Wren	Laurie Bennett	6	-	-	-	-	-	6	-	-	12
=11	Tony Newcombe	Hawke	Tony Newcombe	-	-	-	-	-	-	-	8	4	12
13	Tony Boot	Totem BM1	Tony Boot	3	-	-	-	-	8	-	-	-	11
=14	Richard Steigler	Royale	Richard Steigler	-	-	-	-	-	4	-	-	6	10
=14	Robert Bennett	Wren	R. Bennett	-	-	-	-	-	-	-	10	-	10
16	Ian Edgar	Elfin 620B	Peter George	2	3	-	-	-	-	-	4	-	9
=17	Martin Tighe	Van Diemen		-	-	-	2	-	-	-	-	4	6
=17	Robert Simpson	Agent DR2	Robert Simpson	1	2	-	-	-	-	-	3	-	6
=17	Tony Murphy	Bowin P4	Tony Murphy	-	-	-	-	-	-	-	6	-	6
=20	Andrew Gubb	Royale	Andrew Gubb	-	-	-	-	-	-	2	-	2	4
=20	Garry Jones	Bowin P6		-	-	-	-	4	-	-	-	-	4
=20	Greg Kentwell	Elwyn 003	Greg Kentwell	4	-	-	-	-	-	-	-	-	4
=23	Scott Elson	Lola T440	Scott Elson	-	-	-	-	-	3	-	-	-	3
=23	Tim Murray	Elwyn		-	-	-	3	-	-	-	-	-	3
=23	Mark Poole	Elfin	Mark Poole	-	-	-	-	3	-	-	-	-	3
=23	Aaron Blacksell	Wren	Aaron Blacksell	-	-	-	-	-	-	3	-	-	3
=23	Andrew Robbins	Elfin 620B	Andrew Robbins	-	1	-	-	-	-	-	2	-	3
=28	Steve Giuliana	Bormac		-	-	-	-	-	1	-	-	-	1
=28	Colin McLean	PRS	Colin McLean	-	-	-	-	-	-	-	1	-	1
=28	Anthony Swan	Elwyn		-	-	-	-	-	-	-	-	1	1

Note: Australian Formula Ford regulations in 1985 required cars to be powered by a Ford 1600cc crossflow engine.
