= 1990 Nissan Sydney 500 =

Motor race

Layout of the Eastern Creek Raceway

The 1990 Nissan Sydney 500 was motor race held on 10 November 1990 at Eastern Creek Raceway in Sydney, New South Wales, Australia. The race, which was open to Group 3A Touring Cars, was the final round of both the 1990 Australian Endurance Championship and the 1990 Australian Manufacturers' Championship. Held over a distance of 500 kilometers, it was the first touring car event to be held at Eastern Creek Raceway.

The race was won by Larry Perkins and Tomas Mezera driving a Holden VL Commodore SS Group A SV. The race was broadcast by Ch.9 with commentary provided by Darrell Eastlake, Win Percy, Alan Jones (who also drove a Ford Sierra RS500 in the race), and legendary Formula One commentator Murray Walker (the race was held just a week after the 1990 Australian Grand Prix held in Adelaide).

== Divisional structure ==
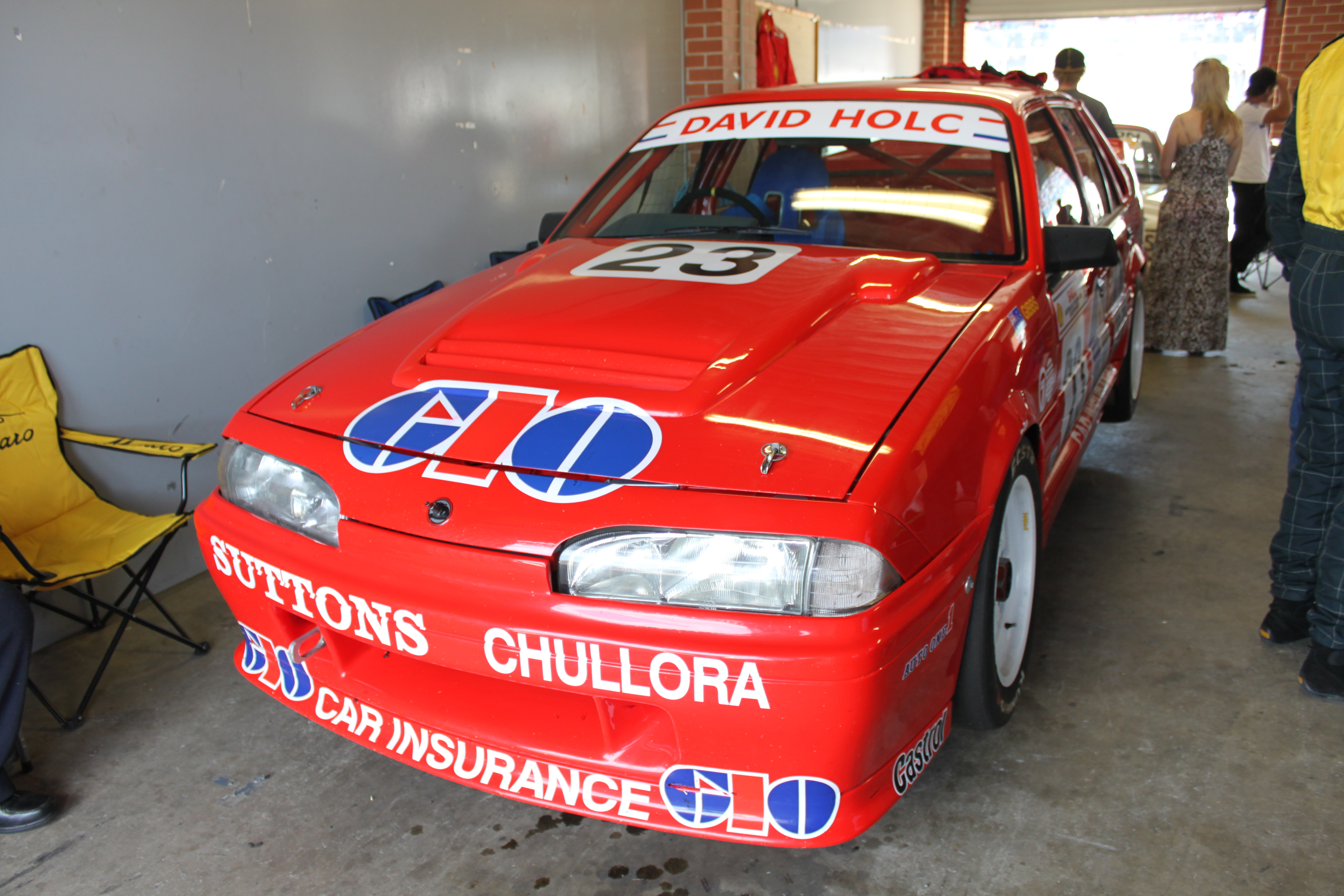
Mark Gibbs and Rohan Onslow drove a Holden VL Commodore SS Group A SV in the race but failed to finish. Image from 2011

Cars competed in three engine capacity divisions.

=== Division 1 ===
Division 1, for cars of 3001cc and Over engine capacity, featured the turbocharged Ford Sierras, Nissan Skylines and Toyota Supras and V8 Holden Commodores.

=== Division 2 ===
Division 2, for cars of 1601 to 3000cc engine capacity, was composed of BMW M3s, a BMW 323i and a Mercedes-Benz 190E.

=== Division 3 ===
Division 3, for cars of Up to 1600cc engine capacity, included various models of Toyota Corolla and Toyota Sprinter.

== Official results ==
=== Top 10 Qualifying ===
Pos	No	Team	Driver	Car	Qual
Pole	1	Nissan Motorsport Australia	(Australia) Mark Skaife	Nissan Skyline R32 GT-R	1:35.26
2	11	Perkins Engineering	(Australia) Larry Perkins	Holden VL Commodore SS Group A SV	1:35.66
3	25	Benson & Hedges Racing	(Australia) Tony Longhurst	Ford Sierra RS500	1:35.78
4	35	Peter Jackson Racing	(Australia) Glenn Seton	Ford Sierra RS500	1:36.18
5	17	Shell Ultra Hi Racing	(Australia) John Bowe	Ford Sierra RS500	1:36.56
6	05	Mobil 1 Racing	(Australia) Peter Brock	Ford Sierra RS500	1:36.68
7	20	Benson & Hedges Racing	(Australia) David Brabham	Ford Sierra RS500	1:37.22
8	21	Bob Forbes Racing	(Australia) Mark Gibbs	Holden VL Commodore SS Group A SV	1:37.26
9	30	Peter Jackson Racing	(Australia) George Fury	Ford Sierra RS500	1:37.36
10	6	Mobil 1 Racing	(Australia) Charlie O'Brien	Ford Sierra RS500	1:37.44

=== Race ===
Race results as follows:

Pos.	Div.	No.	Team	Drivers	Car	Laps	Qual. Pos.
1	1	11	Perkins Engineering	(Australia) Larry Perkins (Australia) Tomas Mezera	Holden VL Commodore SS Group A SV	125	2
2	1	35	Peter Jackson Racing	(Australia) Glenn Seton (Australia) Colin Bond	Ford Sierra RS500	125	4
3	1	05	Mobil 1 Racing	(Australia) Peter Brock (Australia) Andrew Miedecke	Ford Sierra RS500	124	6
4	1	20	Benson & Hedges Racing	(Australia) Gary Brabham (Australia) David Brabham	Ford Sierra RS500	123	7
5	1	30	Peter Jackson Racing	(Australia) George Fury (Australia) Drew Price	Ford Sierra RS500	123	9
6	1	25	Benson & Hedges Racing	(Australia) Tony Longhurst (Australia) Alan Jones	Ford Sierra RS500	123	3
7	1	28	Playscape Racing	(Australia) Kevin Waldock (New Zealand) Andrew Bagnall	Ford Sierra RS500	123	12
8	1	33	Pro-Duct Motorsport	(Australia) Bob Pearson (Australia) Bruce Stewart	Holden VL Commodore SS Group A SV	122	16
9	1	4	Lansvale Racing Team	(Australia) Steve Reed (Australia) Trevor Ashby	Holden VL Commodore SS Group A SV	122	11
10	1	6	Mobil 1 Racing	(Australia) Charlie O'Brien (Australia) David Parsons	Ford Sierra RS500	121	10
11	1	12	Ray Lintott	(Australia) Ray Lintott (Australia) Terry Shiel	Ford Sierra RS500	121	13
12	1	26	Garry Rogers Motorsport	(Australia) Garry Rogers (Australia) Paul Fordham	Holden VL Commodore SS Group A SV	121	14
13	1	27	Terry Finnigan	(Australia) Terry Finnigan (Australia) Geoff Leeds	Holden VL Commodore SS Group A SV	120	15
14	1	42	Lusty Engineering	(Australia) John Lusty (Australia) Bernie Stack	Holden VL Commodore SS Group A SV	119	20
15	2	51	Phil Ward Racing	(Australia) Phil Ward (Australia) John Goss	Mercedes-Benz 190E 2.3-16	118	23
16	2	54	Bryce Racing	(New Zealand) Brett Riley (New Zealand) Craig Baird	BMW M3	117	26
17	1	2	Alf Grant	(Australia) Alf Grant (Australia) Tim Grant	Nissan Skyline HR31 GTS-R	117	24
18	1	45	Lester Smerdon	(Australia) Lester Smerdon (Australia) Graham Jonsson	Holden VL Commodore SS Group A SV	116	25
19	3	71	Toyota Team Australia	(New Zealand) John Faulkner (Australia) John Smith (Australia) Neal Bates	Toyota Corolla FX-GT	115	28
20	2	53	Brian Bolwell Racing	(Australia) Brian Bolwell (Australia) Mike Twigden	BMW 323i	111	29
21	3	78	Phoenix Motorsport	(Australia) Geoff Full (Australia) David Ratcliff	Toyota Sprinter	111	30
22	1	32	Hersonne Engineering	(Australia) Laurie Donaher (Australia) Marc Ducquet	Holden VL Commodore SS Group A	109	34
23	3	76	Peter Verheyen	(Australia) Peter Verheyen (Australia) John Vernon	Toyota Sprinter	109	36
24	3	72	David Sala	(Australia) David Sala (Australia) Richard Vorst	Toyota Corolla	106	32
DNF	1	17	Shell Ultra-Hi Racing	(Australia) Dick Johnson (Australia) John Bowe	Ford Sierra RS500	123	5
DNF	2	52	M3 Motorsport	(Australia) Peter Doulman (Australia) John Cotter	BMW M3	109	22
DNF	3	75	Bob Holden Motors	(Australia) Dennis Rogers (Australia) Garry Jones	Toyota Corolla	75	31
DNF	1	21	Bob Forbes Racing	(Australia) Mark Gibbs (Australia) Rohan Onslow	Holden VL Commodore SS Group A SV	64	8
DNF	1	19	Caltex CXT Racing	(Australia) Ken Mathews (Australia) John Mathews	Ford Sierra RS500	64	27
DNF	1	22	Lusty Engineering	(Australia) Graham Lusty (Australia) Ken Lusty	Holden VL Commodore SS Group A SV	52	21
DNF	1	1	Nissan Motorsport Australia	(New Zealand) Jim Richards (Australia) Mark Skaife	Nissan Skyline R32 GT-R	51	1
DNF	1	29	Wayne Park	(Australia) Wayne Park (Australia) John English	Holden VL Commodore SS Group A SV	49	19
DNF	3	74	Bob Holden Motors	(Australia) Phil Alexander (Australia) Keith McCulloch	Toyota Corolla	44	33
DNF	1	46	Garry Willmington Performance	(Australia) Garry Willmington (Australia) John Bourke	Toyota Supra Turbo	24	18
DNF	1	23	Beaurepaires Racing	(United Kingdom) Chris Lambden (Australia) Des Wall	Nissan Skyline HR31 GTS-R	18	17
DNF	3	73	Bob Holden Motors	(Australia) Bob Holden (Australia) Mike Conway	Toyota Sprinter	8	35
DNS	1	40		(Australia) John Leeson (Australia) Gary Cooke	Holden VL Commodore SS Group A	-	-

== Statistics ==
- Pole Position - #1 Jim Richards - Nissan Skyline R32 GT-R - 1:35.26
- Fastest Lap - #11 Larry Perkins - Holden VL Commodore SS Group A SV - 1:37.84 (new lap record)
- Winners' average speed - 140.61 km/h

== See also ==
1990 Australian Touring Car season
