= 2001 V8 Supercars Phillip Island round =

2001 V8 Supercar championship event

(Victoria (state)) 2001 Phillip Island V8 Supercar round
Event Information
- Round 1 of 13 in the 2001 Shell Championship Series
- Date: 23–25 March 2001
- Location: Phillip Island, Victoria
- Venue: Phillip Island Grand Prix Circuit
- Weather: Fine

Results
Race 1
Distance	28 laps	125 km
Pole position	Mark Skaife; Holden Racing Team	1:32.5121
Winner	Mark Skaife; Holden Racing Team	45:25.3061
Race 2
Distance	28 laps	125 km
Winner	Mark Skaife; Holden Racing Team	45:24.9623
Round Results
First	Mark Skaife; Holden Racing Team	288 pts
Second	Craig Lowndes; Gibson Motorsport	238 pts
Third	Jason Bright; Holden Racing Team	235 pts

The 2001 Phillip Island V8 Supercar round was the first round of the 2001 Shell Championship Series. It was held on the weekend of 23 to 25 March at the Phillip Island Grand Prix Circuit in Victoria, Australia.

The weekend was dominated by Mark Skaife and the Holden Racing Team. Taking pole position in the top-ten shootout followed by two victories, Skaife collected maximum points for the weekend. Craig Lowndes achieved second overall for the round in his first race weekend under the Ford banner and Jason Bright acquired third place in his return to the Shell Championship after he left for Indy Lights at the end of 1999.

== Background ==
One of the bigger talking points in the off-season was Craig Lowndes' defection from Holden to Ford on a five-year deal. At a time where marquee sport was still of prominence, Lowndes' move created great discussion. Moving from the factory Holden team, Lowndes would move to Gibson Motorsport which itself had shifted to the Ford brand for 2001. In the non-championship support event for the Australian Grand Prix, the new partnership proved an immediate success with Lowndes winning two out of the three races across the weekend.

Gibson Motorsport's shift from Holden to Ford, as well as the signing of Lowndes, had initially left their 2000 drivers, Greg Murphy and Steven Richards, out of a drive for 2001. Murphy eventually found himself in the secondary Tom Walkinshaw outfit, retaining the Kmart branding from Gibson Motorsport. Richards meanwhile signed with Glenn Seton Racing after the team initially looked to hire privateer Cameron McLean.

With Lowndes leaving the Holden Racing Team, Jason Bright was drafted in to fill the void. Bright had returned to the series after a season of racing Indy Lights in the United States. Bright had last driven for Stone Brothers Racing, who had since taken onboard two new rookies for 2001 in the form of Marcos Ambrose and David Besnard, who had replaced Rod Nash Racing-bound Tony Longhurst.

One of the favourites for the championship heading into the season was Garth Tander after his breakout year in 2000 which saw him come close to championship glory. His team, Garry Rogers Motorsport, had exhibited strong pace in pre-season testing at Winton and looked set to continue on their form from the previous season.

New Zealand-based outfit, Team Kiwi Racing, would make their full-season debut in the series for 2001 with Jason Richards scheduled to contest all the rounds. Angus Fogg would make select appearances throughout the season.

== Race results ==
=== Pre-Qualifying ===
Both Tom Walkinshaw Racing Australia cars were required to pre-qualify by virtue of being a new entry into the championship. Both Greg Murphy and Todd Kelly, topped the pre-qualifying session. Dean Canto, Greg Ritter, Tyler Mecklem and Jason Richards failed to qualify. Melinda Price had participated in pre-qualifying practice in place of Mecklem at Clive Wiseman Racing.

Pos	No	Name	Team	Vehicle	Time
1	51	(New Zealand) Greg Murphy	Tom Walkinshaw Racing Australia	Holden Commodore (VX)	1:34.1721
2	15	(Australia) Todd Kelly	Tom Walkinshaw Racing Australia	Holden Commodore (VX)	1:34.3774
3	40	(Australia) Cameron McLean	Paragon Motorsport	Ford Falcon (AU)	1:34.7395
4	3	(Australia) Cameron McConville	Lansvale Racing Team	Holden Commodore (VX)	1:35.1669
5	76	(Australia) Matthew White	Matthew White Racing	Holden Commodore (VS)	1:35.5773
6	32	(Australia) Tomas Mezera	Tomas Mezera Motorsport	Holden Commodore (VX)	1:35.9717
7	75	(Australia) Anthony Tratt	Paul Little Racing	Ford Falcon (AU)	1:36.0445
DNQ	45	(Australia) Dean Canto	RPM International Racing	Ford Falcon (AU)	1:36.7556
DNQ	14	(Australia) Greg Ritter	Imrie Motor Sport	Holden Commodore (VT)	1:37.0123
DNQ	50	(Australia) Tyler Mecklem	Clive Wiseman Racing	Holden Commodore (VT)	1:37.1420
DNQ	021	(New Zealand) Jason Richards	Team Kiwi Racing	Holden Commodore (VT)	no time

=== Qualifying ===
Radisich took provisional pole position, being the only driver to set a time below the 1 minute 33 second bracket.

Pos	No	Name	Team	Vehicle	Time
1	18	(New Zealand) Paul Radisich	Dick Johnson Racing	Ford Falcon (AU)	1:32.9761
2	2	(Australia) Jason Bright	Holden Racing Team	Holden Commodore (VX)	1:33.0539
3	1	(Australia) Mark Skaife	Holden Racing Team	Holden Commodore (VX)	1:33.2111
4	4	(Australia) Marcos Ambrose	Stone Brothers Racing	Ford Falcon (AU)	1:33.2147
5	6	(New Zealand) Steven Richards	Glenn Seton Racing	Ford Falcon (AU)	1:33.3521
6	00	(Australia) Craig Lowndes	Gibson Motorsport	Ford Falcon (AU)	1:33.3714
7	15	(Australia) Todd Kelly	Tom Walkinshaw Racing Australia	Holden Commodore (VX)	1:33.3749
8	8	(Australia) Russell Ingall	Perkins Engineering	Holden Commodore (VX)	1:33.4275
9	34	(Australia) Garth Tander	Garry Rogers Motorsport	Holden Commodore (VX)	1:33.4373
10	5	(Australia) Glenn Seton	Glenn Seton Racing	Ford Falcon (AU)	1:33.4539
11	11	(Australia) Larry Perkins	Perkins Engineering	Holden Commodore (VX)	1:33.5014
12	17	(Australia) Steven Johnson	Dick Johnson Racing	Ford Falcon (AU)	1:33.5850
13	51	(New Zealand) Greg Murphy	Tom Walkinshaw Racing Australia	Holden Commodore (VX)	1:33.7035
14	10	(Australia) Mark Larkham	Larkham Motorsport	Ford Falcon (AU)	1:33.8426
15	35	(Australia) Jason Bargwanna	Garry Rogers Motorsport	Holden Commodore (VX)	1:33.9563
16	600	(Australia) John Bowe	Briggs Motorsport	Ford Falcon (AU)	1:33.9596
17	9	(Australia) David Besnard	Stone Brothers Racing	Ford Falcon (AU)	1:34.1019
18	31	(Australia) Steven Ellery	Steven Ellery Racing	Ford Falcon (AU)	1:34.1156
19	29	(Australia) Paul Morris	Paul Morris Motorsport	Holden Commodore (VT)	1:34.1371
20	46	(New Zealand) John Faulkner	John Faulkner Racing	Holden Commodore (VX)	1:34.1707
21	43	(Australia) Paul Weel	Paul Weel Racing	Ford Falcon (AU)	1:34.3605
22	3	(Australia) Cameron McConville	Lansvale Racing Team	Holden Commodore (VX)	1:34.4222
23	21	(Australia) Brad Jones	Brad Jones Racing	Ford Falcon (AU)	1:34.7174
24	16	(Australia) Dugal McDougall	McDougall Motorsport	Holden Commodore (VX)	1:34.7739
25	40	(Australia) Cameron McLean	Paragon Motorsport	Ford Falcon (AU)	1:34.8708
26	32	(Australia) Tomas Mezera	Tomas Mezera Motorsport	Holden Commodore (VX)	1:34.9070
27	7	(Australia) Rodney Forbes	Gibson Motorsport	Ford Falcon (AU)	1:34.9869
28	24	(Australia) Paul Romano	Romano Racing	Holden Commodore (VT)	1:35.1329
29	54	(Australia) Tony Longhurst	Rod Nash Racing	Holden Commodore (VX)	1:35.4848
30	75	(Australia) Anthony Tratt	Paul Little Racing	Ford Falcon (AU)	1:35.5860
31	23	(Australia) Trevor Ashby	Lansvale Racing Team	Holden Commodore (VS)	1:35.8194
32	76	(Australia) Matthew White	Matthew White Racing	Holden Commodore (VS)	1:37.4580

=== Top Ten Shootout ===
Pos	No	Name	Team	Vehicle	Time
1	1	(Australia) Mark Skaife	Holden Racing Team	Holden Commodore (VX)	1:32.5121
2	2	(Australia) Jason Bright	Holden Racing Team	Holden Commodore (VX)	1:32.7961
3	4	(Australia) Marcos Ambrose	Stone Brothers Racing	Ford Falcon (AU)	1:32.8745
4	18	(New Zealand) Paul Radisich	Dick Johnson Racing	Ford Falcon (AU)	1:33.0265
5	5	(Australia) Glenn Seton	Glenn Seton Racing	Ford Falcon (AU)	1:33.0690
6	6	(New Zealand) Steven Richards	Glenn Seton Racing	Ford Falcon (AU)	1:33.2409
7	00	(Australia) Craig Lowndes	Gibson Motorsport	Ford Falcon (AU)	1:33.2985
8	8	(Australia) Russell Ingall	Perkins Engineering	Holden Commodore (VX)	1:33.5311
9	34	(Australia) Garth Tander	Garry Rogers Motorsport	Holden Commodore (VX)	1:33.6165
10	15	(Australia) Todd Kelly	Tom Walkinshaw Racing Australia	Holden Commodore (VX)	1:33.6533

=== Race 1 ===
In an action-packed opening lap that saw Jason Bargwanna and Mark Larkham spin off the track, Mark Skaife established a lead on the field that he would not relinquish. Following him was team-mate Jason Bright and rookie Marcos Ambrose. On lap 4, Ambrose pulled off an ambitious move on Bright for second place into Honda Hairpin. Behind them, Paul Radisich led a gaggle of cars that extended through to the mid-pack. Included in that bunch was Craig Lowndes, who had lost ground on the opening lap, and Greg Murphy, who was battling his way up from a poor qualifying position. John Bowe's race came to an end on lap 12 due to a suspected issue with the front-right suspension.

The pit window opened, allowing for drivers to undertake their compulsory pitstops. Radisich lost a flurry of positions thanks to a slow stop – and would later encounter handling issues that would see him fall further down the pack. Lowndes meanwhile vaulted the pack up into third place, behind Bright. For the remainder of the race, Bright, Lowndes and Ambrose would battle for second place. Up the front, Skaife remained untroubled, taking the chequered flag by over ten seconds. Bright, Lowndes, Ambrose, and Murphy rounded out the top five.

Pos	No	Name	Team	Vehicle	Laps	Time	Grid
1	1	(Australia) Mark Skaife	Holden Racing Team	Holden Commodore (VX)	28	45min 25.3061sec	1
2	2	(Australia) Jason Bright	Holden Racing Team	Holden Commodore (VX)	28	+ 10.10	2
3	00	(Australia) Craig Lowndes	Gibson Motorsport	Ford Falcon (AU)	28	+ 11.65	6
4	4	(Australia) Marcos Ambrose	Stone Brothers Racing	Ford Falcon (AU)	28	+ 12.19	4
5	51	(New Zealand) Greg Murphy	Tom Walkinshaw Racing Australia	Holden Commodore (VX)	28	+ 16.06	13
6	6	(New Zealand) Steven Richards	Glenn Seton Racing	Ford Falcon (AU)	28	+ 20.56	6
7	17	(Australia) Steven Johnson	Dick Johnson Racing	Ford Falcon (AU)	28	+ 25.22	12
8	15	(Australia) Todd Kelly	Tom Walkinshaw Racing Australia	Holden Commodore (VX)	28	+ 25.63	10
9	8	(Australia) Russell Ingall	Perkins Engineering	Holden Commodore (VX)	28	+ 26.80	8
10	5	(Australia) Glenn Seton	Glenn Seton Racing	Ford Falcon (AU)	28	+ 29.24	5
11	31	(Australia) Steven Ellery	Steven Ellery Racing	Ford Falcon (AU)	28	+ 32.00	18
12	18	(New Zealand) Paul Radisich	Dick Johnson Racing	Ford Falcon (AU)	28	+ 34.17	4
13	29	(Australia) Paul Morris	Paul Morris Motorsport	Holden Commodore (VT)	28	+ 37.44	19
14	40	(Australia) Cameron McLean	Paragon Motorsport	Ford Falcon (AU)	28	+ 37.87	25
15	43	(Australia) Paul Weel	Paul Weel Racing	Ford Falcon (AU)	28	+ 46.99	21
16	10	(Australia) Mark Larkham	Larkham Motorsport	Ford Falcon (AU)	28	+ 47.34	14
17	21	(Australia) Brad Jones	Brad Jones Racing	Ford Falcon (AU)	28	+ 51.04	23
18	35	(Australia) Jason Bargwanna	Garry Rogers Motorsport	Holden Commodore (VX)	28	+ 51.33	15
19	54	(Australia) Tony Longhurst	Rod Nash Racing	Holden Commodore (VX)	28	+ 1:02.13	29
20	11	(Australia) Larry Perkins	Perkins Engineering	Holden Commodore (VX)	28	+ 1:20.64	11
21	16	(Australia) Dugal McDougall	McDougall Motorsport	Holden Commodore (VX)	28	+ 1:22.50	24
22	34	(Australia) Garth Tander	Garry Rogers Motorsport	Holden Commodore (VX)	28	+ 1:25.92	9
23	7	(Australia) Rodney Forbes	Gibson Motorsport	Ford Falcon (AU)	28	+ 1:29.38	27
24	32	(Australia) Tomas Mezera	Tomas Mezera Motorsport	Holden Commodore (VX)	28	+ 1:32.90	26
25	76	(Australia) Matthew White	Matthew White Racing	Holden Commodore (VS)	28	+ 1:34.06	32
26	23	(Australia) Trevor Ashby	Lansvale Racing Team	Holden Commodore (VS)	28	+ 1:34.86	31
27	24	(Australia) Paul Romano	Romano Racing	Holden Commodore (VT)	27	+ 1 lap	28
28	3	(Australia) Cameron McConville	Lansvale Racing Team	Holden Commodore (VX)	27	+ 1 lap	22
29	9	(Australia) David Besnard	Stone Brothers Racing	Ford Falcon (AU)	27	+ 1 lap	17
30	46	(New Zealand) John Faulkner	John Faulkner Racing	Holden Commodore (VX)	27	+ 1 lap	20
Ret	600	(Australia) John Bowe	Briggs Motorsport	Ford Falcon (AU)	12	Suspension	16
DNS	75	(Australia) Anthony Tratt	Paul Little Racing	Ford Falcon (AU)		Did not start	
Fastest Lap: Craig Lowndes (Gibson Motorsport) - 1:34.3488 on lap 16

=== Race 2 ===
Despite Bright getting a better start than him, Skaife retained the lead into turn one at the start. On the approach to Siberia on the first lap, Mark Larkham and Matthew White spun causing the chasing pack to scatter. Larkham would retire due to suspension damage sustained in the melee. Further up the road, Radisich also spun and was sent tumbling down the order.

Skaife continued to extend his lead by an average of three tenths per lap. However, on the approach to turn one on lap eight, Skaife collided with a seagull that caused significant damage to his windscreen. It didn't have any significant impact on his lap times however and he remained unchallenged to the flag. Gibson Motorsport's pit crew had once again helped vault Lowndes up the order and found himself in second place after the compulsory pitstops were complete.

The majority of the race remained relatively tranquil with Skaife winning the race by four seconds over Lowndes with Murphy rounding out the podium.

Pos	No	Name	Team	Vehicle	Laps	Time	Grid
1	1	(Australia) Mark Skaife	Holden Racing Team	Holden Commodore (VX)	28	45min 24.9623sec	1
2	00	(Australia) Craig Lowndes	Gibson Motorsport	Ford Falcon (AU)	28	+ 4.09	3
3	51	(New Zealand) Greg Murphy	Tom Walkinshaw Racing Australia	Holden Commodore (VX)	28	+ 5.65	5
4	2	(Australia) Jason Bright	Holden Racing Team	Holden Commodore (VX)	28	+ 6.31	2
5	6	(New Zealand) Steven Richards	Glenn Seton Racing	Ford Falcon (AU)	28	+ 8.77	6
6	4	(Australia) Marcos Ambrose	Stone Brothers Racing	Ford Falcon (AU)	28	+ 10.19	4
7	15	(Australia) Todd Kelly	Tom Walkinshaw Racing Australia	Holden Commodore (VX)	28	+ 15.60	8
8	8	(Australia) Russell Ingall	Perkins Engineering	Holden Commodore (VX)	28	+ 18.68	9
9	17	(Australia) Steven Johnson	Dick Johnson Racing	Ford Falcon (AU)	28	+ 21.17	7
10	5	(Australia) Glenn Seton	Glenn Seton Racing	Ford Falcon (AU)	28	+ 22.19	10
11	31	(Australia) Steven Ellery	Steven Ellery Racing	Ford Falcon (AU)	28	+ 22.35	11
12	34	(Australia) Garth Tander	Garry Rogers Motorsport	Holden Commodore (VX)	28	+ 23.14	22
13	35	(Australia) Jason Bargwanna	Garry Rogers Motorsport	Holden Commodore (VX)	28	+ 23.29	18
14	18	(New Zealand) Paul Radisich	Dick Johnson Racing	Ford Falcon (AU)	28	+ 25.18	12
15	11	(Australia) Larry Perkins	Perkins Engineering	Holden Commodore (VX)	28	+ 29.65	20
16	40	(Australia) Cameron McLean	Paragon Motorsport	Ford Falcon (AU)	28	+ 30.60	14
17	600	(Australia) John Bowe	Briggs Motor Sport	Ford Falcon (AU)	28	+ 36.68	31
18	9	(Australia) David Besnard	Stone Brothers Racing	Ford Falcon (AU)	28	+ 43.16	29
19	46	(New Zealand) John Faulkner	John Faulkner Racing	Holden Commodore (VX)	28	+ 46.94	30
20	3	(Australia) Cameron McConville	Lansvale Racing Team	Holden Commodore (VX)	28	+ 54.73	28
21	7	(Australia) Rodney Forbes	Gibson Motorsport	Ford Falcon (AU)	28	+ 1:07.51	23
22	21	(Australia) Brad Jones	Brad Jones Racing	Ford Falcon (AU)	28	+ 1:11.99	17
23	23	(Australia) Trevor Ashby	Lansvale Racing Team	Holden Commodore (VS)	28	+ 1:18.70	26
24	76	(Australia) Matthew White	Matthew White Racing	Holden Commodore (VS)	28	+ 1:30.82	25
25	43	(Australia) Paul Weel	Paul Weel Racing	Ford Falcon (AU)	28	+ 1:36.22	15
26	32	(Australia) Tomas Mezera	Tomas Mezera Motorsport	Holden Commodore (VX)	27	+ 1 lap	24
27	16	(Australia) Dugal McDougall	McDougall Motorsport	Holden Commodore (VX)	27	+ 1 lap	21
28	54	(Australia) Tony Longhurst	Rod Nash Racing	Holden Commodore (VX)	27	+ 1 lap	19
29	24	(Australia) Paul Romano	Romano Racing	Holden Commodore (VT)	26	+ 2 laps	27
30	75	(Australia) Anthony Tratt	Paul Little Racing	Ford Falcon (AU)	26	+ 2 laps	32
31	29	(Australia) Paul Morris	Paul Morris Motorsport	Holden Commodore (VT)	24	+ 4 laps	13
Ret	10	(Australia) Mark Larkham	Larkham Motorsport	Ford Falcon (AU)	0	Suspension	16
Fastest Lap: Paul Radisich (Dick Johnson Racing) - 1:34.3779 on lap 12

== Championship Standings ==
Standings after Round 1

Pos.	No	Driver	Team	Pts
1	1	(Australia) Mark Skaife	Holden Racing Team	288
2	00	(Australia) Craig Lowndes	Gibson Motorsport	238
3	2	(Australia) Jason Bright	Holden Racing Team	235
4	51	(New Zealand) Greg Murphy	Kmart Racing Team	201
5	4	(Australia) Marcos Ambrose	Stone Brothers Racing	200
