= 2001 V8 Supercars Eastern Creek round =

2001 Supercar Championship event

(New South Wales) 2001 Eastern Creek V8 Supercar round
Event Information
- Round 3 of 13 in the 2001 Shell Championship Series
- Date: 27–29 April 2001
- Location: Eastern Creek, New South Wales
- Venue: Eastern Creek Raceway
- Weather: Fine

Results
Race 1
| Distance | 26 laps | 100 km |
| Pole position | Marcos Ambrose; Stone Brothers Racing | 1:30.8955 |
| Winner | Greg Murphy; Tom Walkinshaw Racing Australia | 43:29.3711 |
Race 2
| Distance | 26 laps | 100 km |
| Winner | Mark Skaife; Holden Racing Team | 41:24.0189 |
Round Results
| First | Mark Skaife; Holden Racing Team | 262 pts |
| Second | Jason Bright; Holden Racing Team | 237 pts |
| Third | Greg Murphy; Tom Walkinshaw Racing Australia | 213 pts |

The 2001 Eastern Creek V8 Supercar round was the third round of the 2001 Shell Championship Series. It was held on the weekend of 28 to 29 November at Eastern Creek International Raceway in Sydney, New South Wales.

The first race was initially won by Craig Lowndes of Gibson Motorsport. However, after he was deemed to have overtaken Greg Murphy under yellow flag conditions, he was issued a 29-second post-race time penalty (the equivalent of a stop-go penalty), bumping him down to 12th and Murphy was declared the winner of the race. Mark Skaife would win the second race in a relatively untroubled run after Murphy was penalised for a jump start.

Skaife would also claim round honours with teammate Jason Bright claiming second and Murphy third.

== Background ==
Following the Adelaide 500, there was controversy in relation to incidents going unpunished by race officials. For this event, the officials relayed that they would be more strict on any offences going forward.

Jason Bright of the Holden Racing Team entered the weekend as the championship leader over teammate Mark Skaife. The factory Holden outfit had dominated the Sydney venue in the last two visits in 1999 and 2000, and were expected to be in a similarly rich vain of form this year. It was acknowledged however that the Ford teams had made a marketable stride forward with the problematic AU Falcon and were expected to be more of a threat in 2001.

=== Entry list ===
There were multiple entrants making their first appearances for the 2001 season at this event. This included Peter Doulman for Doulman Automotive, and Tomas Mezera would shift from his privateer entry run in the first two rounds to Imrie Motorsport for Eastern Creek.

== Race report ==
=== Pre-Qualifying ===
Cameron McConville topped the timing sheets of pre-qualifying with a time nearly two tenths faster than nearest competitor, David Besnard. Jason Richards and Tomas Mezera failed to qualify for the weekend.

| Pos | No | Name | Team | Vehicle | Time |
|---|---|---|---|---|---|
| 1 | 3 | (Australia) Cameron McConville | Lansvale Racing Team | Holden Commodore (VX) | 1:33.4470 |
| 2 | 9 | (Australia) David Besnard | Stone Brothers Racing | Ford Falcon (AU) | 1:33.6309 |
| 3 | 24 | (Australia) Paul Romano | Romano Racing | Holden Commodore (VS) | 1:34.2508 |
| 4 | 43 | (Australia) Paul Weel | Paul Weel Racing | Ford Falcon (AU) | 1:34.3095 |
| 5 | 16 | (Australia) Dugal McDougall | McDougall Motorsport | Holden Commodore (VX) | 1:34.3520 |
| 6 | 52 | (Australia) Peter Doulman | M3 Motorsport | Holden Commodore (VT) | 1:34.1167 |
| 7 | 45 | (Australia) Dean Canto | RPM International Racing | Ford Falcon (AU) | 1:35.3294 |
| DNPQ | 021 | (New Zealand) Jason Richards | Team Kiwi Racing | Holden Commodore (VT) | 1:35.4172 |
| DNPQ | 14 | (Australia) Tomas Mezera | Imrie Motorsport | Holden Commodore (VX) | 1:36.5443 |

=== Qualifying ===
Greg Murphy secured provisional pole position for the first time in 2001 with a time nearly two tenths faster than nearest competitor and former teammate, Steven Richards.

| Pos | No | Name | Team | Vehicle | Time |
|---|---|---|---|---|---|
| 1 | 51 | (New Zealand) Greg Murphy | Tom Walkinshaw Racing Australia | Holden Commodore (VX) | 1:31.3941 |
| 2 | 6 | (New Zealand) Steven Richards | Glenn Seton Racing | Ford Falcon (AU) | 1:31.5774 |
| 3 | 00 | (Australia) Craig Lowndes | Gibson Motorsport | Ford Falcon (AU) | 1:31.6617 |
| 4 | 4 | (Australia) Marcos Ambrose | Stone Brothers Racing | Ford Falcon (AU) | 1:31.8019 |
| 5 | 1 | (Australia) Mark Skaife | Holden Racing Team | Holden Commodore (VX) | 1:31.8051 |
| 6 | 5 | (Australia) Glenn Seton | Glenn Seton Racing | Ford Falcon (AU) | 1:31.8988 |
| 7 | 600 | (Australia) John Bowe | Briggs Motorsport | Ford Falcon (AU) | 1:32.0053 |
| 8 | 15 | (Australia) Todd Kelly | Tom Walkinshaw Racing Australia | Holden Commodore (VX) | 1:32.0215 |
| 9 | 35 | (Australia) Jason Bargwanna | Garry Rogers Motorsport | Holden Commodore (VX) | 1:32.0593 |
| 10 | 2 | (Australia) Jason Bright | Holden Racing Team | Holden Commodore (VX) | 1:32.1036 |
| 11 | 8 | (Australia) Russell Ingall | Perkins Engineering | Holden Commodore (VX) | 1:32.1060 |
| 12 | 10 | (Australia) Mark Larkham | Larkham Motorsport | Ford Falcon (AU) | 1:32.1221 |
| 13 | 17 | (Australia) Steven Johnson | Dick Johnson Racing | Ford Falcon (AU) | 1:32.1709 |
| 14 | 9 | (Australia) David Besnard | Stone Brothers Racing | Ford Falcon (AU) | 1:32.1796 |
| 15 | 18 | (New Zealand) Paul Radisich | Dick Johnson Racing | Ford Falcon (AU) | 1:32.1796 |
| 16 | 31 | (Australia) Steven Ellery | Steven Ellery Racing | Ford Falcon (AU) | 1:32.2795 |
| 17 | 40 | (Australia) Cameron McLean | Paragon Motorsport | Ford Falcon (AU) | 1:32.3122 |
| 18 | 34 | (Australia) Garth Tander | Garry Rogers Motorsport | Holden Commodore (VX) | 1:32.4279 |
| 19 | 3 | (Australia) Cameron McConville | Lansvale Racing Team | Holden Commodore (VX) | 1:32.4877 |
| 20 | 29 | (Australia) Paul Morris | Paul Morris Motorsport | Holden Commodore (VT) | 1:32.4935 |
| 21 | 11 | (Australia) Larry Perkins | Perkins Engineering | Holden Commodore (VX) | 1:32.5029 |
| 22 | 16 | (Australia) Dugal McDougall | McDougall Motorsport | Holden Commodore (VX) | 1:32.7706 |
| 23 | 43 | (Australia) Paul Weel | Paul Weel Racing | Ford Falcon (AU) | 1:32.7933 |
| 24 | 21 | (Australia) Brad Jones | Brad Jones Racing | Ford Falcon (AU) | 1:32.8395 |
| 25 | 46 | (New Zealand) John Faulkner | John Faulkner Racing | Holden Commodore (VT) | 1:33.1477 |
| 26 | 50 | (Australia) Tyler Mecklem | Clive Wiseman Racing | Holden Commodore (VT) | 1:33.5518 |
| 27 | 24 | (Australia) Paul Romano | Romano Racing | Holden Commodore (VX) | 1:33.6450 |
| 28 | 75 | (Australia) Anthony Tratt | Paul Little Racing | Ford Falcon (AU) | 1:33.8365 |
| 29 | 23 | (Australia) Trevor Ashby | Lansvale Racing Team | Holden Commodore (VS) | 1:34.0544 |
| 30 | 45 | (Australia) Dean Canto | RPM International Racing | Ford Falcon (AU) | 1:34.1623 |
| 31 | 54 | (Australia) Tony Longhurst | Rod Nash Racing | Holden Commodore (VX) | 1:34.2954 |
| 32 | 52 | (Australia) Peter Doulman | M3 Motorsport | Holden Commodore (VT) | 1:34.5644 |

=== Top Ten Shootout ===
Marcos Ambrose claimed his first V8 Supercar pole position in only his third event in the category. Skaife spun on his lap and relegated him to last in the pecking order.

| Pos | No | Name | Team | Vehicle | Time | Points |
|---|---|---|---|---|---|---|
| 1 | 4 | (Australia) Marcos Ambrose | Stone Brothers Racing | Ford Falcon (AU) | 1:30.8955 | 18 |
| 2 | 00 | (Australia) Craig Lowndes | Gibson Motorsport | Ford Falcon (AU) | 1:31.1996 | 16 |
| 3 | 6 | (New Zealand) Steven Richards | Glenn Seton Racing | Ford Falcon (AU) | 1:31.4387 | 14 |
| 4 | 5 | (Australia) Glenn Seton | Glenn Seton Racing | Ford Falcon (AU) | 1:31.4998 | 13 |
| 5 | 51 | (New Zealand) Greg Murphy | Tom Walkinshaw Racing Australia | Holden Commodore (VX) | 1:31.5992 | 12 |
| 6 | 600 | (Australia) John Bowe | Briggs Motorsport | Ford Falcon (AU) | 1:31.6266 | 11 |
| 7 | 15 | (Australia) Todd Kelly | Tom Walkinshaw Racing Australia | Holden Commodore (VX) | 1:31.7689 | 10 |
| 8 | 2 | (Australia) Jason Bright | Holden Racing Team | Holden Commodore (VX) | 1:31.942 | 9 |
| 9 | 35 | (Australia) Jason Bargwanna | Garry Rogers Motorsport | Holden Commodore (VX) | 1:32.2104 | 8 |
| 10 | 1 | (Australia) Mark Skaife | Holden Racing Team | Holden Commodore (VX) | 2:21.6514 | 7 |

=== Race 1 ===
Seton surprised the field by snatching the lead from the second row heading into turn one. It was a good change of fortune for him after suffering a front suspension failure in the morning warm-up. Lowndes nestled into second place and Murphy into third, which he lost to Ambrose on lap two after slewing sideways at turn eight. Steven Ellery was spun around by Jason Bargwanna; secondary contact later on in the lap led to Bargwanna returning to the pitlane with damaged front-left suspension.

Ambrose overtook Lowndes for second place after Lowndes attempted a move around the outside of Seton heading into turn two. On lap 10, Lowndes was the first of the front runners to complete their compulsory pitstops. One lap later, Ambrose and Murphy peeled off to complete their stops. Murphy's crew managed to turn the Kiwi around quickly and thus jumped Ambrose in the order to assume effective second place behind Lowndes. At the same time, Paul Romano spun at turn seven and beached himself in the gravel trap. This prompted the safety car and given the rules forbidding pitting under safety car conditions, both Seton and teammate Steven Richards were trapped on the racetrack, having not made their compulsory pitstops, and effectively lost the lead for Seton.

Racing resumed on lap 14 with the Ford Tickford Racing Falcon's leading, albeit still required to undertake their compulsory pitstops. Besides them, there were ten other drivers who had yet to pit. Within two laps, all those drivers would complete their stops, handing the lead to Lowndes. Skaife meanwhile had risen from his lowly tenth qualifying position to fourth. Ambrose began to apply pressure to Murphy for second place. On the approach to turn two, Ambrose made considerable contact with the rear of the Kmart Commodore, sending Murphy wide and allowed the Tasmanian to assume second place. The order remained fairly stagnant for the remainder of the race. Lowndes enjoyed an untroubled run to the chequered flag to take his second win of the second with Ambrose second and Murphy third. Notable performances throughout the field included Brad Jones who had climbed from 24th to sixth, and Tony Longhurst who had finished in the top ten after starting 31st.

Post-race penalties for Lowndes and Ambrose would see the Ford drivers lose their first and second place finishes and relegate them down the order. In the instance of Lowndes, he was adjudged to have passed Murphy under yellow flag conditions heading into turn two. As a result, he was issued a 29-second time penalty (equivalent of a stop-go penalty), dropping him to 12th. Ambrose meanwhile was pinged for his contact with Murphy at turn two on lap 18. He was issued a similar penalty to Lowndes and thus was bumped down to 13th. Murphy was subsequently rewarded with the race win.

| Pos | No | Driver | Team | Car | Laps | Time | Grid | Points |
|---|---|---|---|---|---|---|---|---|
| 1 | 51 | (New Zealand) Greg Murphy | Tom Walkinshaw Racing Australia | Holden Commodore (VX) | 26 | 43min 29.3711sec | 5 | 135 |
| 2 | 1 | (Australia) Mark Skaife | Holden Racing Team | Holden Commodore (VX) | 26 | + 0.98 | 10 | 120 |
| 3 | 2 | (Australia) Jason Bright | Holden Racing Team | Holden Commodore (VX) | 26 | + 7.64 | 8 | 108 |
| 4 | 600 | (Australia) John Bowe | Briggs Motorsport | Ford Falcon (AU) | 26 | + 8.24 | 6 | 99 |
| 5 | 18 | (New Zealand) Paul Radisich | Dick Johnson Racing | Ford Falcon (AU) | 26 | + 8.84 | 15 | 93 |
| 6 | 21 | (Australia) Brad Jones | Brad Jones Racing | Ford Falcon (AU) | 26 | + 15.10 | 24 | 87 |
| 7 | 29 | (Australia) Paul Morris | Paul Morris Motorsport | Holden Commodore (VT) | 26 | + 19.69 | 20 | 81 |
| 8 | 43 | (Australia) Paul Weel | Paul Weel Racing | Ford Falcon (AU) | 26 | + 19.98 | 23 | 75 |
| 9 | 40 | (Australia) Cameron McLean | Paragon Motorsport | Ford Falcon (AU) | 26 | + 20.25 | 17 | 72 |
| 10 | 54 | (Australia) Tony Longhurst | Rod Nash Racing | Holden Commodore (VX) | 26 | + 21.53 | 31 | 69 |
| 11 | 16 | (Australia) Dugal McDougall | McDougall Motorsport | Holden Commodore (VX) | 26 | + 22.55 | 22 | 66 |
| 12 | 00 | (Australia) Craig Lowndes | Gibson Motorsport | Ford Falcon (AU) | 26 | + 25.34 | 2 | 63 |
| 13 | 4 | (Australia) Marcos Ambrose | Stone Brothers Racing | Ford Falcon (AU) | 26 | + 28.44 | 1 | 60 |
| 14 | 6 | (New Zealand) Steven Richards | Glenn Seton Racing | Ford Falcon (AU) | 26 | + 31.71 | 3 | 57 |
| 15 | 17 | (Australia) Steven Johnson | Dick Johnson Racing | Ford Falcon (AU) | 26 | + 34.19 | 13 | 54 |
| 16 | 15 | (Australia) Todd Kelly | Tom Walkinshaw Racing Australia | Holden Commodore (VX) | 26 | + 34.19 | 7 | 51 |
| 17 | 5 | (Australia) Glenn Seton | Glenn Seton Racing | Ford Falcon (AU) | 26 | + 35.35 | 4 | 48 |
| 18 | 75 | (Australia) Anthony Tratt | Paul Little Racing | Ford Falcon (AU) | 26 | + 38.79 | 28 | 45 |
| 19 | 9 | (Australia) David Besnard | Stone Brothers Racing | Ford Falcon (AU) | 26 | + 38.91 | 14 | 42 |
| 20 | 34 | (Australia) Garth Tander | Garry Rogers Motorsport | Holden Commodore (VX) | 26 | + 41.17 | 18 | 39 |
| 21 | 52 | (Australia) Peter Doulman | M3 Motorsport | Holden Commodore (VT) | 26 | + 42.51 | 32 | 36 |
| 22 | 10 | (Australia) Mark Larkham | Larkham Motorsport | Ford Falcon (AU) | 26 | + 42.74 | 12 | 33 |
| 23 | 8 | (Australia) Russell Ingall | Perkins Engineering | Holden Commodore (VX) | 26 | + 42.97 | 11 | 30 |
| 24 | 11 | (Australia) Larry Perkins | Perkins Engineering | Holden Commodore (VX) | 26 | + 46.09 | 21 | 27 |
| 25 | 3 | (Australia) Cameron McConville | Lansvale Racing Team | Holden Commodore (VX) | 26 | + 46.53 | 19 | 24 |
| 26 | 31 | (Australia) Steven Ellery | Steven Ellery Racing | Ford Falcon (AU) | 26 | + 57.37 | 16 | 21 |
| 27 | 45 | (Australia) Dean Canto | RPM International Racing | Ford Falcon (AU) | 26 | + 1:04.84 | 30 | 18 |
| 28 | 46 | (New Zealand) John Faulkner | John Faulkner Racing | Holden Commodore (VT) | 26 | + 1:06.85 | 25 | 15 |
| 29 | 23 | (Australia) Trevor Ashby | Lansvale Racing Team | Holden Commodore (VS) | 25 | + 1 lap | 29 | 12 |
| 30 | 24 | (Australia) Paul Romano | Romano Racing | Holden Commodore (VX) | 23 | + 3 laps | 27 | 9 |
| Ret | 35 | (Australia) Jason Bargwanna | Garry Rogers Motorsport | Holden Commodore (VX) | 4 | Suspension | 9 | |
| Ret | 50 | (Australia) Tyler Mecklem | Clive Wiseman Racing | Holden Commodore (VT) | 2 | Retired | 26 | |
Fastest Lap: Todd Kelly (Tom Walkinshaw Racing Australia) - 1:32.8645 on lap 18

=== Race 2 ===
Murphy led the field into turn one from pole position but within a lap, the stewards would issue him with a stop-go penalty for a jump start. On lap three, Murphy peeled off to complete his penalty. In the process, Murphy failed to come to a complete stop and despite the urging of the present marshal, Ray Robins, Murphy drove away to resume the race. Despite the controversy surrounding this incident, the stewards elected not to re-penalise Murphy on the account that they felt he had already served a penalty appropriate for the original offence.

Following this, the race remained relatively tranquil. Skaife continued to eek out a lead over teammate Bright and Steven Richards lost five laps on the leading pack after encountering car problems whilst in the pitlane. With a handful of laps remaining, Lowndes had become locked in combat with John Bowe for fourth place. Bargwanna and Russell Ingall came to blows at turn eight, sending the former into a spin.

Skaife remained unchallenged to the flag to take his third win of the season. Bright finished second and Paul Radisich rounded out the podium; a welcome result after struggling for pace throughout most of the weekend. Murphy had completed his own recovery drive from 30th to finish 11th, and in doing so, secured third overall in round points.

| Pos | No | Driver | Team | Car | Laps | Time | Grid | Points |
|---|---|---|---|---|---|---|---|---|
| 1 | 1 | (Australia) Mark Skaife | Holden Racing Team | Holden Commodore (VX) | 26 | 41min 24.0189sec | 2 | 135 |
| 2 | 2 | (Australia) Jason Bright | Holden Racing Team | Holden Commodore (VX) | 26 | + 9.46 | 3 | 120 |
| 3 | 18 | (Australia) Paul Radisich | Dick Johnson Racing | Ford Falcon (AU) | 26 | + 15.24 | 5 | 108 |
| 4 | 600 | (Australia) John Bowe | Briggs Motorsport | Ford Falcon (AU) | 26 | + 18.06 | 4 | 99 |
| 5 | 00 | (Australia) Craig Lowndes | Gibson Motorsport | Ford Falcon (AU) | 26 | + 19.02 | 12 | 93 |
| 6 | 4 | (Australia) Marcos Ambrose | Stone Brothers Racing | Ford Falcon (AU) | 26 | + 20.59 | 13 | 87 |
| 7 | 5 | (Australia) Glenn Seton | Glenn Seton Racing | Ford Falcon (AU) | 26 | + 22.29 | 3 | 81 |
| 8 | 15 | (Australia) Todd Kelly | Tom Walkinshaw Racing Australia | Holden Commodore (VX) | 26 | + 27.90 | 16 | 75 |
| 9 | 40 | (Australia) Cameron McLean | Paragon Motorsport | Ford Falcon (AU) | 26 | + 31.89 | 9 | 72 |
| 10 | 34 | (Australia) Garth Tander | Garry Rogers Motorsport | Holden Commodore (VX) | 26 | + 34.23 | 20 | 69 |
| 11 | 51 | (New Zealand) Greg Murphy | Tom Walkinshaw Racing Australia | Holden Commodore (VX) | 26 | + 35.77 | 1 | 66 |
| 12 | 8 | (Australia) Russell Ingall | Perkins Engineering | Holden Commodore (VX) | 26 | + 37.19 | 23 | 63 |
| 13 | 29 | (Australia) Paul Morris | Paul Morris Motorsport | Holden Commodore (VT) | 26 | + 39.47 | 7 | 60 |
| 14 | 21 | (Australia) Brad Jones | Brad Jones Racing | Ford Falcon (AU) | 26 | + 39.82 | 6 | 57 |
| 15 | 17 | (Australia) Steven Johnson | Dick Johnson Racing | Ford Falcon (AU) | 26 | + 40.15 | 15 | 54 |
| 16 | 3 | (Australia) Cameron McConville | Lansvale Racing Team | Holden Commodore (VX) | 26 | + 40.59 | 25 | 51 |
| 17 | 35 | (Australia) Jason Bargwanna | Garry Rogers Motorsport | Holden Commodore (VX) | 26 | + 44.52 | 31 | 48 |
| 18 | 11 | (Australia) Larry Perkins | Perkins Engineering | Holden Commodore (VX) | 26 | + 50.59 | 24 | 45 |
| 19 | 16 | (Australia) Dugal McDougall | McDougall Motorsport | Holden Commodore (VX) | 26 | + 52.25 | 11 | 42 |
| 20 | 54 | (Australia) Tony Longhurst | Rod Nash Racing | Holden Commodore (VX) | 26 | + 53.74 | 10 | 39 |
| 21 | 10 | (Australia) Mark Larkham | Larkham Motorsport | Ford Falcon (AU) | 26 | + 56.38 | 22 | 36 |
| 22 | 31 | (Australia) Steven Ellery | Steven Ellery Racing | Ford Falcon (AU) | 26 | + 56.51 | 26 | 33 |
| 23 | 43 | (Australia) Paul Weel | Paul Weel Racing | Ford Falcon (AU) | 26 | + 1:11.09 | 8 | 30 |
| 24 | 46 | (New Zealand) John Faulkner | John Faulkner Racing | Holden Commodore (VT) | 26 | + 1:12.67 | 28 | 27 |
| 25 | 45 | (Australia) Dean Canto | RPM International Racing | Ford Falcon (AU) | 26 | + 1:13.61 | 27 | 24 |
| 26 | 23 | (Australia) Trevor Ashby | Lansvale Racing Team | Holden Commodore (VS) | 26 | + 1:16.36 | 29 | 21 |
| 27 | 24 | (Australia) Paul Romano | Romano Racing | Holden Commodore (VX) | 26 | + 1:27.08 | 30 | 18 |
| 28 | 75 | (Australia) Anthony Tratt | Paul Little Racing | Ford Falcon (AU) | 26 | + 1:34.07 | 18 | 15 |
| 29 | 52 | (Australia) Peter Doulman | M3 Motorsport | Holden Commodore (VT) | 25 | + 1 lap | 21 | 12 |
| 30 | 50 | (Australia) Tyler Mecklem | Clive Wiseman Racing | Holden Commodore (VT) | 25 | + 1 lap | 32 | 9 |
| 31 | 6 | (New Zealand) Steven Richards | Glenn Seton Racing | Ford Falcon (AU) | 21 | + 5 laps | 14 | 6 |
| Ret | 9 | (Australia) David Besnard | Stone Brothers Racing | Ford Falcon (AU) | 9 | Retired | 19 | |
Fastest Lap: Marcos Ambrose (Stone Brothers Racing) - 1:33.0016 on lap 11

== Championship points ==
Round points tally

| Pos. | No | Driver | Team | Pts |
|---|---|---|---|---|
| 1 | 1 | (Australia) Mark Skaife | Holden Racing Team | 262 |
| 2 | 2 | (Australia) Jason Bright | Holden Racing Team | 237 |
| 3 | 51 | (New Zealand) Greg Murphy | Tom Walkinshaw Racing Australia | 213 |
| 4 | 600 | (Australia) John Bowe | Briggs Motorsport | 209 |
| 5 | 18 | (New Zealand) Paul Radisich | Dick Johnson Racing | 201 |

Drivers' Championship standings after Round 3

| Pos. | No | Driver | Team | Pts |
|---|---|---|---|---|
| 1 | 2 | (Australia) Jason Bright | Holden Racing Team | 940 |
| 1 | 1 | (Australia) Mark Skaife | Holden Racing Team | 890 |
| 3 | 17 | (Australia) Steven Johnson | Dick Johnson Racing | 716 |
| 4 | 8 | (Australia) Russell Ingall | Perkins Engineering | 713 |
| 5 | 15 | (Australia) Todd Kelly | Tom Walkinshaw Racing Australia | 633 |
