= 2001 V8 Supercars Oran Park round =

2001 sports event

(New South Wales) 2001 Oran Park V8 Supercar round
Event Information
- Round 8 of 13 in the 2001 Shell Championship Series
- Date: 27–29 July 2001
- Location: Sydney, New South Wales
- Venue: Oran Park Raceway
- Weather: Fine

Results
Race 1
Distance	36 laps	100 km
Pole position	Craig Lowndes; Gibson Motorsport	1:08.0671
Winner	Mark Skaife; Holden Racing Team	44:52.5714
Race 2
Distance	36 laps	100 km
Winner	Mark Skaife; Holden Racing Team	43:03.6026
Round Results
First	Mark Skaife; Holden Racing Team	286 pts
Second	David Besnard; Stone Brothers Racing	242 pts
Third	Craig Lowndes; Gibson Motorsport	219 pts

The 2001 Oran Park V8 Supercar round was the eighth round of the 2001 Shell Championship Series. It was the 31st ATCC/V8 Supercar event to be held at Oran Park and was held on the weekend of 28 to 29 July at the Oran Park Raceway in Narellan, New South Wales.

Championship leader Mark Skaife recovered from a difficult previous round at Calder Park to win both races and claimed overall round winners to boot to extend his lead in the drivers standings. Craig Lowndes claimed pole position for the first race of the weekend and finished second for that race. The surprise package of the weekend was David Besnard who, after enduring a tough debut season to date, claimed back-to-back podiums and had briefly led the second race en route to finish second overall for the round.

== Background ==
The event was held on the weekend of 28 to 29 July 2001. It was the 31st ATCC/V8 Supercar event to be held at Oran Park Raceway, and consisted of two 100 km races with compulsory pitstops in both instances.

Mark Skaife entered the round at the championship leader by 17 points over teammate and nearest competitor, Jason Bright.

The Oran Park venue received a multi-million dollar upgrade to the pit facilities prior to the 2001 event. This included the widenening of the pit lane and brand-new pit buildings fit with VIP suites.

During the Saturday warm-up session, Greg Murphy's car caught one of the Briggs Motorsport air hoses. It brought the gantry down and injured two of the Briggs Motorsport crew members, one of whom were transported via ambulance to Liverpool Hospital where he would undergo surgery for head injury. The session was red flag while the team members were given medical assistance. Multiple teams down the paddock offered help to the Briggs Motorsport team in the aftermath. Perkins Engineering offered a spare pit boom while Murphy's team had two of their crew members fill in for pit stop duty.

=== Entry list ===
There were 36 drivers entered for this round, with a grid capacity of 32. Pre-qualifying would determine which four drivers would be eliminated from racing contention.

Mick Donaher replaced Tyler Mecklem at Clive Wiseman Racing. Peter Doulman would return to the series in his privateer outfit for his final solo appearance. Two older model EL Falcon's were entered by way of Garry Holt with Emerzidis Motorsport and Luke Sieders with his privateer outfit. Steve Williams was also entered with V8 Racing, and British driver Matt Neal would debut the brand new VX Commodore for Paul Morris Motorsport.

For the only time this season, Paul Romano would not make an appearance.

== Race results ==
=== Pre-Qualifying ===
After failing to qualify at the previous round at Calder Park, John Faulkner topped the timing sheets in pre-qualifying, being the only driver to set a time under the 1 minute 15 second bracket. Dugal McDougall, Anthony Tratt, Dean Canto, Peter Doulman and Steve Williams all failed to qualify.

Pos	No	Name	Team	Vehicle	Time
1	46	(New Zealand) John Faulkner	John Faulkner Racing	Holden Commodore (VT)	1:14.9329
2	021	(New Zealand) Jason Richards	Team Kiwi Racing	Holden Commodore (VT)	1:15.0401
3	50	(Australia) Mick Donaher	Clive Wiseman Racing	Holden Commodore (VT)	1:15.5367
4	14	(Australia) Tomas Mezera	Imrie Motorsport	Holden Commodore (VX)	1:16.1135
5	20	(Australia) Garry Holt	Eastern Creek Kart Racing	Ford Falcon (EL)	1:16.2383
6	67	(United Kingdom) Matt Neal	Paul Morris Motorsport	Holden Commodore (VX)	1:16.4036
7	56	(Australia) Luke Sieders	Sieders Racing Team	Ford Falcon (EL)	1:16.7998
DNPQ	16	(Australia) Dugal McDougall	McDougall Motorsport	Holden Commodore (VX)	1:16.8889
DNPQ	75	(Australia) Anthony Tratt	Paul Little Racing	Ford Falcon (AU)	1:17.1045
DNPQ	45	(Australia) Dean Canto	RPM International Racing	Ford Falcon (AU)	1:17.1348
DNPQ	52	(Australia) Peter Doulman	M3 Motorsport	Holden Commodore (VT)	1:17.6812
DNPQ	77	(Australia) Steve Williams	V8 Racing	Holden Commodore (VS)	1:18.5650

=== Qualifying ===
In a cold and wet Friday qualifying session, Steven Johnson topped the timing sheets to take provisional pole position, closely followed by David Besnard. Mark Skaife and Craig Lowndes were the only two other drivers to set a time below the 1 minute 8 second bracket. Dugal McDougall, Anthony Tratt and Dean Canto failed to qualify for the event.

Matt Neal crashed heavily at the final corner during the second session of qualifying. The damage inflicted on the car would render him out of contention for the rest of the weekend.

Pos	No	Name	Team	Vehicle	Time
1	17	(Australia) Steven Johnson	Dick Johnson Racing	Ford Falcon (AU)	1:07.9145
2	9	(Australia) David Besnard	Stone Brothers Racing	Ford Falcon (AU)	1:07.9281
3	1	(Australia) Mark Skaife	Holden Racing Team	Holden Commodore (VX)	1:07.9811
4	00	(Australia) Craig Lowndes	Gibson Motorsport	Ford Falcon (AU)	1:07.9886
5	8	(Australia) Russell Ingall	Perkins Engineering	Holden Commodore (VX)	1:08.0021
6	2	(Australia) Jason Bright	Holden Racing Team	Holden Commodore (VX)	1:08.0350
7	15	(Australia) Todd Kelly	Tom Walkinshaw Racing Australia	Holden Commodore (VX)	1:08.0812
8	600	(Australia) John Bowe	Briggs Motorsport	Ford Falcon (AU)	1:08.1080
9	34	(Australia) Garth Tander	Garry Rogers Motorsport	Holden Commodore (VX)	1:08.1216
10	3	(Australia) Cameron McConville	Lansvale Racing Team	Holden Commodore (VX)	1:08.1491
11	18	(New Zealand) Paul Radisich	Dick Johnson Racing	Ford Falcon (AU)	1:08.1997
12	31	(Australia) Steven Ellery	Steven Ellery Racing	Ford Falcon (AU)	1:08.2377
13	10	(Australia) Mark Larkham	Larkham Motorsport	Ford Falcon (AU)	1:08.2652
14	51	(New Zealand) Greg Murphy	Tom Walkinshaw Racing Australia	Holden Commodore (VX)	1:08.2859
15	11	(Australia) Larry Perkins	Perkins Engineering	Holden Commodore (VX)	1:08.3653
16	4	(Australia) Marcos Ambrose	Stone Brothers Racing	Ford Falcon (AU)	1:08.4599
17	54	(Australia) Tony Longhurst	Rod Nash Racing	Holden Commodore (VX)	1:08.5772
18	40	(Australia) Cameron McLean	Paragon Motorsport	Ford Falcon (AU)	1:08.6057
19	21	(Australia) Brad Jones	Brad Jones Racing	Ford Falcon (AU)	1:08.6831
20	43	(Australia) Paul Weel	Paul Weel Racing	Ford Falcon (AU)	1:08.6871
21	5	(Australia) Glenn Seton	Glenn Seton Racing	Ford Falcon (AU)	1:08.7001
22	50	(Australia) Michael Donaher	Clive Wiseman Racing	Holden Commodore (VT)	1:08.7132
23	29	(Australia) Paul Morris	Paul Morris Motorsport	Holden Commodore (VT)	1:08.7143
24	35	(Australia) Jason Bargwanna	Garry Rogers Motorsport	Holden Commodore (VX)	1:08.8318
25	7	(Australia) Rodney Forbes	Gibson Motorsport	Ford Falcon (AU)	1:08.8574
26	46	(New Zealand) John Faulkner	John Faulkner Racing	Holden Commodore (VT)	1:08.8610
27	6	(New Zealand) Steven Richards	Glenn Seton Racing	Ford Falcon (AU)	1:08.9305
28	021	(New Zealand) Jason Richards	Team Kiwi Racing	Holden Commodore (VT)	1:09.0318
29	67	(United Kingdom) Matt Neal	Paul Morris Motorsport	Holden Commodore (VX)	1:09.2683
30	14	(Australia) Tomas Mezera	Imrie Motorsport	Holden Commodore (VT)	1:09.6189
31	20	(Australia) Gary Holt	Eastern Creek Kart Racing	Ford Falcon (EL)	1:10.4830
32	56	(Australia) Luke Sieders	Sieders Racing Team	Ford Falcon (EL)	1:11.4899

=== Top Ten Shootout ===
Craig Lowndes took his first pole position for the Gibson Motorsport team in 2001. It was also the first pole position for the Ford brand at Oran Park since 1995.

Pos	No	Name	Team	Vehicle	Time
1	00	(Australia) Craig Lowndes	Gibson Motorsport	Ford Falcon (AU)	1:08.0671
2	1	(Australia) Mark Skaife	Holden Racing Team	Holden Commodore (VX)	1:08.2295
3	9	(Australia) David Besnard	Stone Brothers Racing	Ford Falcon (AU)	1:08.6557
4	15	(Australia) Todd Kelly	Tom Walkinshaw Racing Australia	Holden Commodore (VX)	1:08.7935
5	17	(Australia) Steven Johnson	Dick Johnson Racing	Ford Falcon (AU)	1:08.8438
6	8	(Australia) Russell Ingall	Perkins Engineering	Holden Commodore (VX)	1:08.9998
7	2	(Australia) Jason Bright	Holden Racing Team	Holden Commodore (VX)	1:09.0888
8	600	(Australia) John Bowe	Briggs Motor Sport	Ford Falcon (AU)	1:09.6301
9	34	(Australia) Garth Tander	Garry Rogers Motorsport	Holden Commodore (VX)	1:09.7164
10	3	(Australia) Cameron McConville	Lansvale Racing Team	Holden Commodore (VX)	1:09.7857

=== Race 1 ===
Lowndes bogged down slightly compared to those around him. Skaife seized the lead while Lowndes fell behind Besnard and Todd Kelly. The race would soon be brought under safety car conditions when an incident involved Marcos Ambrose, Mark Larkham and Greg Murphy saw the latter stranded on the inside of turn two with broken steering.

The race resumed on lap five, with Skaife streaking away from the field while Besnard struggled with rear-end grip and soon came under pressure from Lowndes. The pit window opened on lap eight and multiple drivers, including Kelly, took the opportunity to make their compulsory pitstop. A cross-threaded wheel nut cost Paul Radisich 45 seconds in the pitlane. After the cycle of pitstops, Lowndes overtook Besnard after the Caltex driver ran wide over the bridge. Kelly meanwhile experienced a loss of pace and fell behind both Ford drivers to fourth place. Jason Bright suffered a slow pitstop and lost a half dozen positions. Brad Jones suffered handling and brake issues after colliding with a rabbit at the turn one apex.

On lap 32, Tony Longhurst and Ambrose came to blows at turn two after the former attempted a move down the inside. Ambrose was turned into a spin and lost ground. Both Larry Perkins and John Bowe retired late into the race due to mechanical issues. Up the front, Skaife enjoyed a dominant race and cruised home to take victory ahead of Lowndes and Besnard.

Pos	No	Driver	Team	Car	Laps	Time	Grid
1	1	(Australia) Mark Skaife	Holden Racing Team	Holden Commodore (VX)	36	44min 52.5714sec	2
2	00	(Australia) Craig Lowndes	Gibson Motorsport	Ford Falcon (AU)	36	+ 5.62	1
3	9	(Australia) David Besnard	Stone Brothers Racing	Ford Falcon (AU)	36	+ 6.71	3
4	15	(Australia) Todd Kelly	Tom Walkinshaw Racing Australia	Holden Commodore (VX)	36	+ 14.21	4
5	17	(Australia) Steven Johnson	Dick Johnson Racing	Ford Falcon (AU)	36	+ 17.31	5
6	34	(Australia) Garth Tander	Garry Rogers Motorsport	Holden Commodore (VX)	36	+ 20.01	9
7	2	(Australia) Jason Bright	Holden Racing Team	Holden Commodore (VX)	36	+ 20.29	7
8	8	(Australia) Russell Ingall	Perkins Engineering	Holden Commodore (VX)	36	+ 22.93	6
9	35	(Australia) Jason Bargwanna	Garry Rogers Motorsport	Holden Commodore (VX)	36	+ 23.33	24
10	3	(Australia) Cameron McConville	Lansvale Racing Team	Holden Commodore (VX)	36	+ 25.70	10
11	5	(Australia) Glenn Seton	Glenn Seton Racing	Ford Falcon (AU)	36	+ 30.37	21
12	21	(Australia) Brad Jones	Brad Jones Racing	Ford Falcon (AU)	36	+ 30.99	19
13	54	(Australia) Tony Longhurst	Rod Nash Racing	Holden Commodore (VX)	36	+ 36.44	17
14	31	(Australia) Steven Ellery	Steven Ellery Racing	Ford Falcon (AU)	36	+ 36.90	12
15	29	(Australia) Paul Morris	Paul Morris Motorsport	Holden Commodore (VT)	36	+ 44.51	23
16	4	(Australia) Marcos Ambrose	Stone Brothers Racing	Ford Falcon (AU)	36	+ 45.59	16
17	18	(New Zealand) Paul Radisich	Dick Johnson Racing	Ford Falcon (AU)	36	+ 45.99	11
18	7	(Australia) Rodney Forbes	Gibson Motorsport	Ford Falcon (AU)	36	+ 58.42	25
19	6	(New Zealand) Steven Richards	Glenn Seton Racing	Ford Falcon (AU)	36	+ 58.56	27
20	021	(New Zealand) Jason Richards	Team Kiwi Racing	Holden Commodore (VT)	36	+ 1:11.97	28
21	46	(New Zealand) John Faulkner	John Faulkner Racing	Holden Commodore (VT)	35	+ 1 lap	26
22	43	(Australia) Paul Weel	Paul Weel Racing	Ford Falcon (AU)	35	+ 1 lap	20
23	40	(Australia) Cameron McLean	Paragon Motorsport	Ford Falcon (AU)	35	+ 1 lap	18
24	14	(Australia) Tomas Mezera	Imrie Motorsport	Holden Commodore (VX)	34	+ 2 laps	30
25	20	(Australia) Gary Holt	Eastern Creek Kart Racing	Ford Falcon (EL)	34	+ 2 laps	31
Ret	11	(Australia) Larry Perkins	Perkins Engineering	Holden Commodore (VX)	32	Rear axle	15
Ret	600	(Australia) John Bowe	Briggs Motorsport	Ford Falcon (AU)	20	Power steering	8
Ret	50	(Australia) Michael Donaher	Clive Wiseman Racing	Holden Commodore (VT)	9	Mechanical	22
Ret	10	(Australia) Mark Larkham	Larkham Motorsport	Ford Falcon (AU)	7	Accident damage	13
Ret	51	(New Zealand) Greg Murphy	Tom Walkinshaw Racing Australia	Holden Commodore (VX)	0	Steering	14
DNS	67	(United Kingdom) Matt Neal	Paul Morris Motorsport	Holden Commodore (VX)		Did Not Start	
DNS	56	(Australia) Luke Sieders	Sieders Racing Team	Ford Falcon (EL)		Did Not Start	
Fastest Lap: Mark Skaife (Holden Racing Team) - 1:08.8221 on lap 5

=== Race 2 ===
Besnard leapt off the line well to draw alongside Skaife heading into the first two corners, finally taking the lead into turn three. Lowndes followed in behind to get into second and Skaife slipped to third. Ambrose's weekend went from bad to worse when he was spun by Paul Morris going over the bridge.

Skaife soon took back second from Lowndes on lap two and immediately set off in pursuit of Besnard, whom he would re-pass for the lead on lap five. He began to rapidly extend his lead, demonstrating that the pace of the Holden Racing Team unit was indomitable. John Faulkner was the first casualty of the race after suffering terminal mechanical problems. Larry Perkins was tipped into a spin at turn two by Rodney Forbes. Besnard was the first of the leaders to undertake their compulsory pitstops. Skaife would follow suit just one lap later. Ambrose retired on lap 14 due to engine problems.

By the midway point, Lowndes began to pressure Besnard for second place. However, Besnard withstood the pressure and eventually managed to extend the gap over Lowndes as the laps whittled down as the Gibson Motorsport driver began to struggle with rear tyre durability. Jason Bargwanna was enjoying a strong run before coming to an end on lap 19, pulling off onto the go-kart track at turn four due to mechanical issues. With a handful of laps remaining, Lowndes received a bad sportsmanship flag for kerb-hopping. The lack of pace meant he would soon call into the clutches of Jason Bright. With four laps remaining, Bright would pass Lowndes for third.

"Garth Tander and I were fighting for fourth position and he touched the rear of my car and turned me around. With the other cars quite close, I had to keep the boot in to finish in front of them. It was one giant burnout, wasn't it?"

— Craig Lowndes on his late-race incident with Garth Tander

Skaife remained unopposed to the chequered flag, taking the race win and round win to cement Holden Racing Team's return to the top of the rostrum. Besnard likewise enjoyed a relatively trouble-free run to the line to pick up second place in the race, and in the overall round. At the final corner of the final lap, Lowndes was spun by Garth Tander and relegated Lowndes to eighth as he desperately attempted to foster his Falcon to the finish line. Tander would receive a 32-second time penalty for this incident and despite the setback, Lowndes would retain third place in overall round points.

Pos	No	Driver	Team	Car	Laps	Time	Grid
1	1	(Australia) Mark Skaife	Holden Racing Team	Holden Commodore (VX)	36	43min 03.6026sec	1
2	9	(Australia) David Besnard	Stone Brothers Racing	Ford Falcon (AU)	36	+ 7.00	3
3	2	(Australia) Jason Bright	Holden Racing Team	Holden Commodore (VX)	36	+ 8.43	5
4	17	(Australia) Steven Johnson	Dick Johnson Racing	Ford Falcon (AU)	36	+ 16.65	5
5	8	(Australia) Russell Ingall	Perkins Engineering	Holden Commodore (VX)	36	+ 17.92	8
6	3	(Australia) Cameron McConville	Lansvale Racing Team	Holden Commodore (VX)	36	+ 19.59	10
7	00	(Australia) Craig Lowndes	Gibson Motorsport	Ford Falcon (AU)	36	+ 22.12	2
8	15	(Australia) Todd Kelly	Tom Walkinshaw Racing Australia	Holden Commodore (VX)	36	+ 24.92	4
9	18	(New Zealand) Paul Radisich	Dick Johnson Racing	Ford Falcon (AU)	36	+ 27.20	17
10	31	(Australia) Steven Ellery	Steven Ellery Racing	Ford Falcon (AU)	36	+ 28.06	14
11	51	(New Zealand) Greg Murphy	Tom Walkinshaw Racing Australia	Holden Commodore (VX)	36	+ 37.20	30
12	6	(New Zealand) Steven Richards	Glenn Seton Racing	Ford Falcon (AU)	36	+ 38.17	19
13	21	(Australia) Brad Jones	Brad Jones Racing	Ford Falcon (AU)	36	+ 38.49	12
14	600	(Australia) John Bowe	Briggs Motorsport	Ford Falcon (AU)	36	+ 44.23	27
15	5	(Australia) Glenn Seton	Glenn Seton Racing	Ford Falcon (AU)	36	+ 45.16	11
16 ^{1}	34	(Australia) Garth Tander	Garry Rogers Motorsport	Holden Commodore (VX)	36	+ 45.77	6
17	43	(Australia) Paul Weel	Paul Weel Racing	Ford Falcon (AU)	36	+ 46.68	22
18	29	(Australia) Paul Morris	Paul Morris Motorsport	Holden Commodore (VT)	36	+ 56.99	15
19	54	(Australia) Tony Longhurst	Rod Nash Racing	Holden Commodore (VX)	36	+ 1:01.63	13
20	10	(Australia) Mark Larkham	Larkham Motorsport	Ford Falcon (AU)	35	+ 1 lap	29
21	021	(New Zealand) Jason Richards	Team Kiwi Racing	Holden Commodore (VT)	35	+ 1 lap	20
22	11	(Australia) Larry Perkins	Perkins Engineering	Holden Commodore (VX)	35	+ 1 lap	26
23	14	(Australia) Tomas Mezera	Imrie Motorsport	Holden Commodore (VX)	35	+ 1 lap	24
24	40	(Australia) Cameron McLean	Paragon Motorsport	Ford Falcon (AU)	35	+ 1 lap	23
25	7	(Australia) Rodney Forbes	Gibson Motorsport	Ford Falcon (AU)	35	+ 1 lap	18
26	20	(Australia) Gary Holt	Eastern Creek Kart Racing	Ford Falcon (EL)	34	+ 2 laps	25
Ret	35	(Australia) Jason Bargwanna	Garry Rogers Motorsport	Holden Commodore (VX)	19	Mechanical	9
Ret	4	(Australia) Marcos Ambrose	Stone Brothers Racing	Ford Falcon (AU)	14	Engine	16
Ret	46	(New Zealand) John Faulkner	John Faulkner Racing	Holden Commodore (VT)	7	Mechanical	21
DNS	67	(United Kingdom) Matt Neal	Paul Morris Motorsport	Holden Commodore (VX)		Did Not Start	
DNS	56	(Australia) Luke Sieders	Sieders Racing Team	Ford Falcon (EL)		Did Not Start	
Fastest Lap: Mark Skaife (Holden Racing Team) - 1:09.1719 on lap 3

Notes

- ^1 – Garth Tander was given a 32-second penalty after he was deemed to have gained an advantage by spinning Craig Lowndes on the final lap.

== Championship points ==
Round points tally

Pos.	No	Driver	Team	Pts
1	1	(Australia) Mark Skaife	Holden Racing Team	286
2	9	(Australia) David Besnard	Stone Brothers Racing	242
3	00	(Australia) Craig Lowndes	Gibson Motorsport	219
4	17	(Australia) Steven Johnson	Dick Johnson Racing	204
5	2	(Australia) Jason Bright	Holden Racing Team	199

Drivers' Championship standings after Round 8

Pos.	No	Driver	Team	Pts
1	1	(Australia) Mark Skaife	Holden Racing Team	2006
2	2	(Australia) Jason Bright	Holden Racing Team	1902
3	17	(Australia) Steven Johnson	Dick Johnson Racing	1692
4	8	(Australia) Russell Ingall	Perkins Engineering	1675
5	00	(Australia) Craig Lowndes	Gibson Motorsport	1365
