= Tomas Mezera =

Australian racing driver (born 1958)

- Nationality: (Australia) Australian
- Born: 5 November 1958 (age 68) Czechoslovakia
- Retired: 2004

ATCC / V8 Supercar
- Years active: 1992–2004
- Teams: Peter Williamson Toyota; Tony Longhurst Racing; Perkins Engineering; Holden Racing Team; Daily Planet Racing; Gibson Motorsport; Tomas Mezera Motorsport; Brad Jones Racing; Romano Racing; Imrie Motor Sport; Paul Little Racing
- Starts: 67
- Best finish: 5th in 1995 Australian Touring Car Championship

Previous series
- 1982–85 1987 1988–89 1990: Australian Formula Ford Series; British Formula Ford; British Formula 3 All Japan Sports Prototype

Tomas Mezera (born 5 November 1958 in Czechoslovakia) is a naturalised Australian racing driver. Mezera won the 1988 Bathurst 1000, and for many years was a member of the Holden Racing Team as both a driver and team manager. Mezera's sporting career began as a downhill skier in his native Czechoslovakia, before he emigrated to Australia to be a ski instructor. Mezera retired from racing in 2004 but continues to hold roles in motorsport, most recently as a driving standards advisor to several domestic motor racing championships.

== Personal life ==
Born in 1958 in communist Czechoslovakia, Mezera was a skilled tennis player and skier in his youth – qualifying for and placing in national level ski events under the tutelage of his father, a ski coach in his own right. Mezera had an interest in motor racing at a young age and took part in amateur hillclimbs in the family Škoda. Mezera took up a Physics course at university after leaving school and joined their ski team, escaping to Hungary during an event and defecting to Austria via Belgrade. Having spent the second half of 1979 in a refugee camp outside Vienna, he arrived in Sydney prior to Christmas where he moved in with relatives. To make his start in racing, he worked as a garbage man, a panelbeater and a restaurant hand in Kings Cross.

== Formula racing ==
Mezera quickly was introduced to racing and joined the ranks of Formula Ford in 1982. In November 1983, he was offered a drive for the 1984 FF season in a Reynard FF83, after being spotted by David Haydon of Dalcar Industries. Mezera finished fifth in the 1984 Formula Ford Driver to Europe Series, and won the 1985 Motorcraft Formula Ford Driver to Europe Series driving the Dalcar Reynard FF83 prepared by motorsport enthusiast and team owner David Haydon (with engines supplied by the Frank Gardner run JPS Team BMW). In 1987, he returned to Europe and the British Formula Ford Championship, finishing second. He had two poor years in British Formula 3 compromised by lack of budget. He found work as driving instructor to stay in Europe with hopes of reaching his goal as a professional in Europe.

== Touring / Sports Cars ==
During 1988 while working as a driving instructor in England, Mezera was able to secure much needed parts for the Ford Sierra RS500 Group A touring car team run by Frank Gardner and Tony Longhurst. As it was Gardner's protest at Bathurst in 1987 that had led to the disqualification of Ford Europe supported Eggenberger Motorsport Sierras and caused them to lose the 1987 World Touring Car Championship to BMW, Ford did not want to supply parts to Tony Longhurst Racing team manager Gardner, and Mezera was asked to buy the needed parts for the team. As a reward Mezera was given the job of Longhurst's co-driver for the Sandown 500 and Bathurst 1000 races.

The pair won the 1988 Tooheys 1000 in their Benson & Hedges backed Ford Sierra RS500, with Mezera driving the car across the finish line. He then returned to Europe to continue his pursuit of racing professionally overseas, returning to Australia for the endurance season, racing for Perkins Engineering from 1989 until 1991. He finished third with Larry Perkins in the 1990 Bathurst 1000, and the pair won the 1990 Nissan Sydney 500 at Eastern Creek Raceway.

This led to racing a Porsche 962 for fellow Aussie Vern Schuppan in the All Japan Sports Prototype Championship and a drive in the 24 Hours of Le Mans in 1990 finishing 15th with co-drivers Eje Elgh and Thomas Danielsson. He had five races in the British Touring car Championship in 1989 and 1990 with two podium finishes.

When Win Percy returned to England after the 1991 season, Mezera was hired to drive for the Holden Racing Team. He was briefly assumed the role of team manager in 1993 after the departure of Neal Lowe until Jeff Grech was recruited.

Mezera was the first pole sitter when the ATCC became V8 Supercars in 1993 at Sydney's tight Amaroo Park circuit. He continued to race for HRT as teammate to Peter Brock until the end of the 1995 season before being replaced by Craig Lowndes. He was briefly part of John Trimbole's Daily Planet Racing before starting his own team in 1998 with the help of Derek van Zelm and on limited budget ran in the V8 Supercars Championship from 1998 until 2001. His full-time racing career wound down at that point although he continued to get drives as a hired gun for many teams.

In 2001, Mezera made a return to the Holden Racing Team as an endurance driver and finished third in the 2002 Bathurst 1000 and fourth at the 2002 Queensland 500.

Mezera retired from racing in 2004 and later served as a Driving Standards Official for Confederation of Australian Motor Sport and V8 Supercars Australia.

== Career results ==
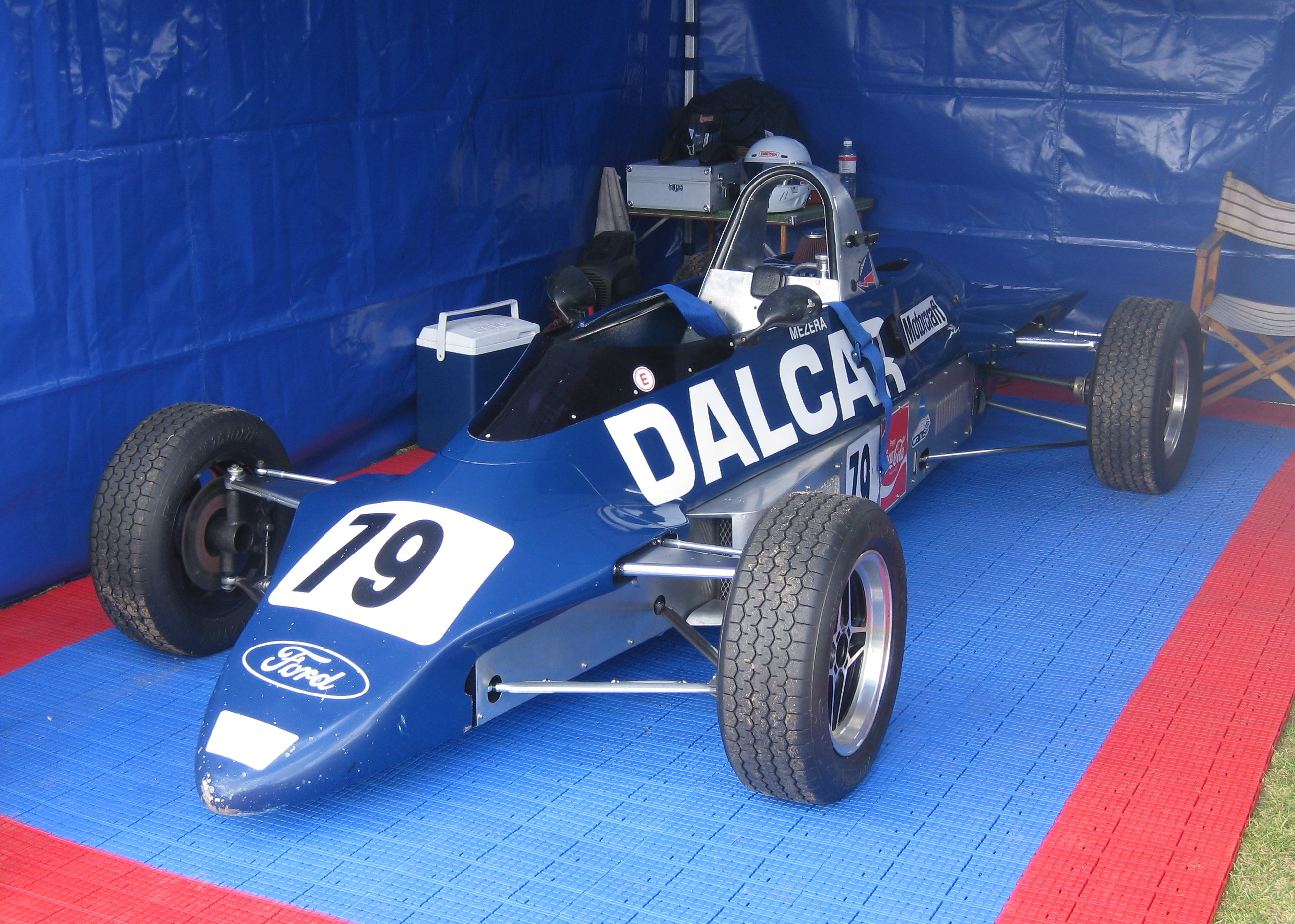
The Reynard FF83 with which Mezera won the 1985 Motorcraft Formula Ford Driver to Europe Series

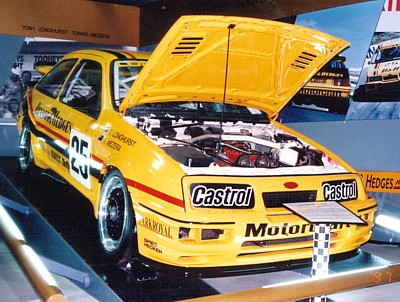
The Ford Sierra RS500 Mezera drove to win 1988 Tooheys 1000

Season	Series	Position	Car	Team
1982	TAA Formula Ford Driver to Europe Series	19th	Carlboro – Ford	Tomas Mezera Motorsport
1984	Formula Ford Driver to Europe Series	5th	Reynard FF84 – Ford	Dalcar Racing – David Haydon Motorsport
1985	Motorcraft Formula Ford Driver to Europe Series	**1st**	Reynard FF83 – Ford; Elwyn 003 – Ford	Dalcar Racing – David Haydon Motorsport
1987	British Formula Ford Championship	**2nd**	Van Diemen RF97 Ford	Van Diemen
1988	British Formula 3 Championship	12th	Reynard 873 – Volkswagen	Peter Lea Racing
1988	Asia Pacific Touring Car Championship	7th	Ford Sierra RS500	Benson & Hedges Racing
1989	British Touring Car Championship	42nd	Ford Sierra RS500	Team Labatt's
1990	Australian Endurance Championship	**2nd**	Holden VL Commodore SS Group A SV	Perkins Engineering
1990	All Japan Sports Prototype Championship	18th	Porsche 962C	Omron Racing Team
1992	Australian Touring Car Championship	16th	Holden VN Commodore SS Group A	Holden Racing Team
1993	Australian Touring Car Championship	7th	Holden VP Commodore	Holden Racing Team
1994	Australian Touring Car Championship	9th	Holden VP Commodore	Holden Racing Team
1995	Australian Touring Car Championship	5th	Holden VR Commodore	Holden Racing Team
1998	Australian Touring Car Championship	21st	Holden VS Commodore	Challenge Motorsport; Gibson Motorsport
1998	ATCC Privateers Cup	**2nd**	Holden VS Commodore	Challenge Motorsport
1999	Shell Championship Series	45th	Holden VT Commodore	Tomas Mezera Motorsport
2000	Shell Championship Series	55th	Holden VT Commodore	Tomas Mezera Motorsport
2001	Shell Championship Series	28th	Holden VX Commodore	Tomas Mezera Motorsport; Imrie Motor Sport; Holden Racing Team
2002	V8 Supercar Championship Series	34th	Holden VX Commodore	Imrie Motor Sport; Holden Racing Team
2003	V8 Supercar Championship Series	51st	Holden VX Commodore	Perkins Engineering
2004	V8 Supercar Championship Series	37th	Holden VY Commodore	Paul Little Racing

=== Complete Australian Touring Car Championship results ===
(key) (Races in bold indicate pole position) (Races in italics indicate fastest lap)

Year	Team	Car	1	2	3	4	5	6	7	8	9	10	11	12	13	14	15	16	17	18	19	20	21	22	23	24	25	26	27	28	29	30	31	32	33	34	35	DC	Points
1992	Holden Racing Team	Holden VN Commodore SS Group A SV	AMA; R1	AMA; R2	SAN; R3; 6	SAN; R4; Ret	SYM; R5	SYM; R6	WIN; R7	WIN; R8	LAK; R9	LAK; R10	EAS; R11	EAS; R12	MAL; R13	MAL; R14	BAR; R15	BAR; R16	ORA; R17	ORA; R18																		16th	29
1993	Holden Racing Team	Holden VP Commodore	AMA; R1; DNS	**AMA**; **R2**; **5**	**AMA**; **R3**; **Ret**	SYM; R4; 2	SYM; R5; 2	PHI; R6; 12	PHI; R7; 5	LAK; R8; Ret	LAK; R9; DNS	WIN; R10; Ret	WIN; R11; DNS	EAS; R12; 11	EAS; R13; 7	MAL; R14; 3	MAL; R15; 4	BAR; R16; 5	BAR; R17; Ret	ORA; R18; 5	ORA; R19; 2																	7th	85
1994	Holden Racing Team	Holden VP Commodore	AMA; R1; 9	AMA; R2; 4	SAN; R3; 2	SAN; R4; 15	SYM; R5; 6	SYM; R6; 12	PHI; R7; 10	PHI; R8; 5	LAK; R9; Ret	LAK; R10; DNS	WIN; R11; 11	WIN; R12; 8	EAS; R13; 5	EAS; R14; 4	MAL; R15; 6	MAL; R16; Ret	BAR; R17; 11	BAR; R18; 5	ORA; R19; 8	ORA; R20; 7																9th	111
1995	Holden Racing Team	Holden VR Commodore	SAN; R1; Ret	SAN; R2; 6	SYM; R3; 2	SYM; R4; 3	BAT; R5; 6	BAT; R6; 4	PHI; R7; 12	PHI; R8; DNS	LAK; R9; 5	LAK; R10; 5	WIN; R11; 7	WIN; R12; 4	EAS; R13; 10	EAS; R14; 7	MAL; R15; 5	MAL; R16; 6	BAR; R17; 4	BAR; R18; 6	ORA; R19; 6	ORA; R20; 8																5th	163
1998	Challenge Motorsport	Holden VS Commodore	SAN; R1	SAN; R2	SAN; R3	SYM; R4	SYM; R5	SYM; R6	LAK; R7; 15	LAK; R8; 13	LAK; R9; Ret	PHI; R10; 16	PHI; R11; 17	PHI; R12; 17	WIN; R13	WIN; R14	WIN; R15	MAL; R16	MAL; R17	MAL; R18	BAR; R19	BAR; R20	BAR; R21	CAL; R22	CAL; R23	CAL; R24	HDV; R25	HDV; R26	HDV; R27	ORA; R28	ORA; R29	ORA; R30						24th	116
1998	Gibson Motorsport	Holden VS Commodore	SAN; R1	SAN; R2	SAN; R3	SYM; R4	SYM; R5	SYM; R6	LAK; R7	LAK; R8	LAK; R9	PHI; R10	PHI; R11	PHI; R12	WIN; R13	WIN; R14	WIN; R15	MAL; R16	MAL; R17	MAL; R18	BAR; R19	BAR; R20	BAR; R21	CAL; R22; Ret	CAL; R23; 15	CAL; R24; C	HDV; R25; 14	HDV; R26; 9	HDV; R27; 11	ORA; R28; 15	ORA; R29; 12	ORA; R30; 16						24th	116
1999	Tomas Mezera Motorsport	Holden Commodore (VS)	EAS; R1; 18	EAS; R2; 14	EAS; R3; DNS	ADE; R4; 20	BAR; R5	BAR; R6	BAR; R7	PHI; R8; Ret	PHI; R9; Wth	PHI; R10; Wth	HDV; R11	HDV; R12	HDV; R13	SAN; R14; 19	SAN; R15; 14	SAN; R16; 18	QLD; R17; 28	QLD; R18; 19	QLD; R19; 18	CAL; R20	CAL; R21	CAL; R22	SYM; R23	SYM; R24	SYM; R25	WIN; R26	WIN; R27	WIN; R28	ORA; R29	ORA; R30	ORA; R31	QLD; R32; Ret	BAT; R33; Ret			45th	174
2000	Tomas Mezera Motorsport	Holden Commodore (VT)	PHI; R1; 24	PHI; R2; 25	BAR; R3; 26	BAR; R4; 27	BAR; R5; 17	ADE; R6; 21	ADE; R7; 18	EAS; R8; 25	EAS; R9; Ret	EAS; R10; 23	HDV; R11	HDV; R12	HDV; R13	CAN; R14; Ret	CAN; R15; 22	CAN; R16; 18	QLD; R17; 26	QLD; R18; Ret	QLD; R19; Ret	WIN; R20; Wth	WIN; R21; Wth	WIN; R22; Wth	ORA; R23	ORA; R24	ORA; R25	CAL; R26	CAL; R27	CAL; R28	QLD; R29	SAN; R30; 22	SAN; R31; 18	SAN; R32; 23	BAT; R33			55th	36
2000	Brad Jones Racing	Ford Falcon (AU)	PHI; R1	PHI; R2	BAR; R3	BAR; R4	BAR; R5	ADE; R6	ADE; R7	EAS; R8	EAS; R9	EAS; R10	HDV; R11	HDV; R12	HDV; R13	CAN; R14	CAN; R15	CAN; R16	QLD; R17	QLD; R18	QLD; R19	WIN; R20	WIN; R21	WIN; R22	ORA; R23	ORA; R24	ORA; R25	CAL; R26	CAL; R27	CAL; R28	QLD; R29; Ret	SAN; R30	SAN; R31	SAN; R32	BAT; R33; Ret			55th	36
2001	Tomas Mezera Motorsport	Holden Commodore (VT)	PHI; R1; 24	PHI; R2; 26	ADE; R3; Ret	ADE; R4; 15	EAS; R5	EAS; R6	HDV; R7	HDV; R8	HDV; R9	CAN; R10	CAN; R11	CAN; R12	BAR; R13	BAR; R14	BAR; R15	CAL; R16	CAL; R17	CAL; R18	ORA; R19	ORA; R20	QLD; R21	WIN; R22	WIN; R23	BAT; R24	PUK; R25	PUK; R26	PUK; R27	SAN; R28	SAN; R29	SAN; R30						28th	898
2001	Imrie Motorsport	Holden Commodore (VX)	PHI; R1	PHI; R2	ADE; R3	ADE; R4	EAS; R5; DNQ	EAS; R6; DNQ	HDV; R7	HDV; R8	HDV; R9	CAN; R10	CAN; R11	CAN; R12	BAR; R13	BAR; R14	BAR; R15	CAL; R16; 26	CAL; R17; 26	CAL; R18; 22	ORA; R19; 24	ORA; R20; 23	QLD; R21	WIN; R22	WIN; R23	BAT; R24	PUK; R25; 12	PUK; R26; 22	PUK; R27; 18	SAN; R28; 23	SAN; R29; 18	SAN; R30; 19						28th	898
2001	Holden Racing Team	Holden Commodore (VX)	PHI; R1	PHI; R2	ADE; R3	ADE; R4	EAS; R5	EAS; R6	HDV; R7	HDV; R8	HDV; R9	CAN; R10	CAN; R11	CAN; R12	BAR; R13	BAR; R14	BAR; R15	CAL; R16	CAL; R17	CAL; R18	ORA; R19	ORA; R20	QLD; R21; 5	WIN; R22	WIN; R23	BAT; R24; Ret	PUK; R25	PUK; R26	PUK; R27	SAN; R28	SAN; R29	SAN; R30						28th	898
2002	Imrie Motorsport	Holden Commodore (VX)	ADE; R1; DNQ	ADE; R2; DNQ	PHI; R3; DNQ	PHI; R4; DNQ	EAS; R5	EAS; R6	EAS; R7	HDV; R8	HDV; R9	HDV; R10	CAN; R11	CAN; R12	CAN; R13	BAR; R14	BAR; R15	BAR; R16	ORA; R17	ORA; R18	WIN; R19	WIN; R20	QLD; R21	BAT; R22	SUR; R23	SUR; R24	PUK; R25	PUK; R26	PUK; R27	SAN; R28	SAN; R29							34th	232
2002	Holden Racing Team	Holden Commodore (VX)	ADE; R1	ADE; R2	PHI; R3	PHI; R4	EAS; R5	EAS; R6	EAS; R7	HDV; R8	HDV; R9	HDV; R10	CAN; R11	CAN; R12	CAN; R13	BAR; R14	BAR; R15	BAR; R16	ORA; R17	ORA; R18	WIN; R19	WIN; R20	QLD; R21; 4	BAT; R22; 3	SUR; R23	SUR; R24	PUK; R25	PUK; R26	PUK; R27	SAN; R28	SAN; R29							34th	232
2003	Perkins Engineering	Holden Commodore (VX)	ADE; R1	ADE; R1	PHI; R3	EAS; R4	WIN; R5	BAR; R6	BAR; R7	BAR; R8	HDV; R9	HDV; R10	HDV; R11	QLD; R12	ORA; R13	SAN; R14; Ret	BAT; R15; 14	SUR; R16	SUR; R17	PUK; R18	PUK; R19	PUK; R20	EAS; R21	EAS; R22														51st	140
2004	Paul Little Racing	Holden Commodore (VY)	ADE; R1	ADE; R2	EAS; R3	PUK; R4	PUK; R5	PUK; R6	HDV; R7	HDV; R8	HDV; R9	BAR; R10	BAR; R11	BAR; R12	QLD; R13	WIN; R14	ORA; R15	ORA; R16	SAN; R17; 12	BAT; R18; 18	SUR; R19	SUR; R20	SYM; R21	SYM; R22	SYM; R23	EAS; R24	EAS; R25	EAS; R26										37th	272

=== Complete Asia-Pacific Touring Car Championship results ===
(key) (Races in bold indicate pole position) (Races in italics indicate fastest lap)

Year	Team	Car	1	2	3	4	DC	Points
1988	Benson & Hedges Racing	Ford Sierra RS500	BAT; 1	WEL	PUK	FJI	7th	20

=== Complete British Touring Car Championship results ===
(key)

Year	Team	Car	Class	1	2	3	4	5	6	7	8	9	10	11	12	13	DC	Pts	Class
1989	Trident Motorsport	Maserati Biturbo	A	OUL	SIL	THR; Ret	DON	THR	SIL; DNS	SIL	BRH	SNE					42nd	4	16th
1989	Labatt's Team	Ford Sierra RS500	A										BRH; 3	BIR			42nd	4	16th
1989	JQF Engineering	Ford Sierra RS500	A												DON; Ret	SIL; 4	42nd	4	16th
1990	Labatt's Team	Ford Sierra RS500	A	OUL	DON; 3‡†	THR	SIL	OUL	SIL	BRH	SNE	BRH	BIR	DON	THR	SIL	NC	0	NC

‡ Endurance driver.

† Not eligible for points due to being an endurance driver.

=== Complete Bathurst 1000 results ===
Year	Team	Co-drivers	Car	Class	Laps	Overall position	Class position
1985	(Australia) Peter Williamson Toyota	(Australia) Peter Williamson	Toyota Celica Supra	B	32	DNF	DNF
1988	(Australia) Tony Longhurst Racing	(Australia) Tony Longhurst	Ford Sierra RS500	A	161	**1st**	**1st**
1989	(Australia) Perkins Engineering	(Australia) Larry Perkins	Holden VL Commodore SS Group A SV	A	158	6th	6th
1990	(Australia) Perkins Engineering	(Australia) Larry Perkins	Holden VL Commodore SS Group A SV	A	161	**3rd**	**3rd**
1991	(Australia) Perkins Engineering	(Australia) Larry Perkins	Holden VN Commodore SS Group A SV	1	65	DNF	DNF
1992	(Australia) Holden Racing Team	(Australia) Brad Jones	Holden VP Commodore	C	131	15th	**2nd**
1993	(Australia) Holden Racing Team	(United Kingdom) Win Percy	Holden VP Commodore	A	107	DNF	DNF
1994	(Australia) Holden Racing Team	(Australia) Peter Brock	Holden VP Commodore	A	138	DNF	DNF
1995	(Australia) Holden Racing Team	(Australia) Peter Brock	Holden VR Commodore		32	DNF	DNF
1996	(Australia) Holden Racing Team	(Australia) Peter Brock	Holden VR Commodore		160	5th	5th
1997	(Australia) Daily Planet Racing	(Australia) John Trimbole	Holden VS Commodore	L1	25	DNF	DNF
1998	(Australia) Tomas Mezera Motorsport	(Switzerland) Alain Menu	Holden VT Commodore	OC	0	DNF	DNF
1999	(Australia) Tomas Mezera Motorsport	(Australia) Tony Ricciardello	Holden VT Commodore		41	DNF	DNF
2000	(Australia) Brad Jones Racing	(Australia) Brad Jones	Ford AU Falcon		159	DNF	DNF
2001	(Australia) Holden Racing Team	(Australia) Jason Bright	Holden VX Commodore		126	DNF	DNF
2002	(Australia) Holden Racing Team	(Australia) Jason Bright	Holden VX Commodore		161	**3rd**	**3rd**
2003	(Australia) Perkins Engineering	(Australia) Paul Dumbrell	Holden VX Commodore		155	14th	14th
2004	(Australia) Paul Little Racing	(Australia) Anthony Tratt	Holden VY Commodore		157	18th	18th

=== Complete 24 Hours of Le Mans results ===
Year	Team	Co-drivers	Car	Class	Laps	Pos.	Class pos.
1990	(Australia) Team Schuppan (Japan) Omron Racing	(Sweden) Eje Elgh (Sweden) Thomas Danielsson	Porsche 962C	C1	326	15th	15th

Sporting positions
Preceded by Ron Barnacle	Winner of the Motorcraft Formula Ford Driver to Europe Series; 1985	Succeeded by Warwick Rooklyn
Preceded by Peter Brock; David Parsons; Peter McLeod	Winner of the Bathurst 1000; 1988 (with) Tony Longhurst	Succeeded by Dick Johnson; John Bowe
Preceded by	Winner of the Nissan Sydney 500; 1990 (with) Larry Perkins	Succeeded by
