= Bob Holden (racing driver) =

Australian racing driver (born 1932)

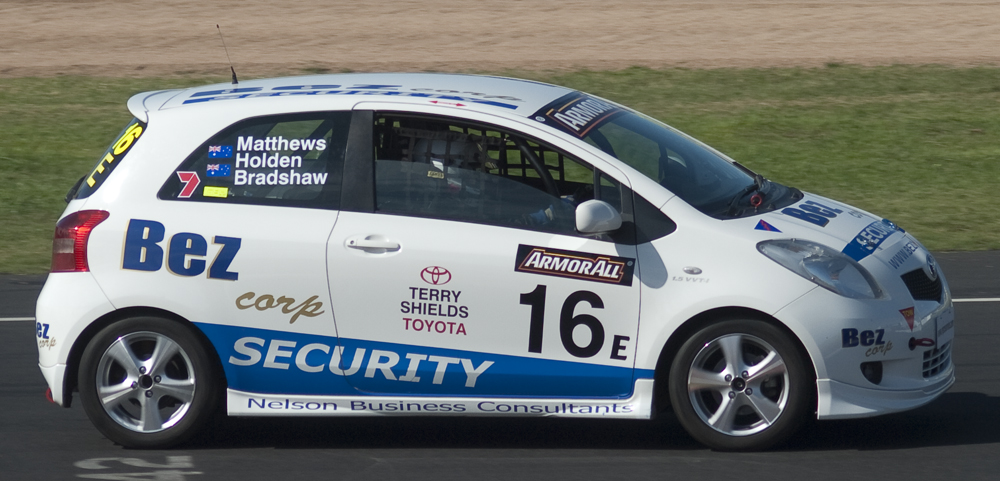
- Nationality: Australian
- Born: Robin John Holden; 1 December 1932 (age 93) Notting Hill, Victoria

Australian Super Touring Championship
- Years active: 1993–98
- Teams: Bob Holden Motors
- Starts: 34
- Best finish: 7th in 1993 Australian 2.0 Litre Touring Car Championship

Previous series
- 1961-86 1963: Australian Touring Car Champ. Australian Drivers' Champ.

Championship titles
- 1966: Bathurst 1000

Robin John "Bob" Holden (born 1 December 1932 in Notting Hill, Victoria) is an Australian racing driver. Holden raced small-engined touring cars throughout his career, racing Peugeots in the early 1960s, establishing a reputation for himself which saw him become a regular part of BMC Australia racing program for Minis which culminated with a victory in the 1966 Bathurst 500 co-driving with Rauno Aaltonen. Into the 1970s Holden moved on to race Ford Escorts in various guises, moving into Toyota Corollas in the 1980s, winning the 1.6-litre class at the Bathurst round of the 1987 World Touring Car Championship. In the mid-1990s Holden moved into BMW M3s and later a BMW 318i Super Touring car in which he raced his final Bathurst 1000 in 1998, at the time setting the record for most Bathurst appearances.

Holden continued his involvement in motorsport, competing in historic racing, and has restored two of his Group C Ford Escorts to race in historic touring car racing. He has also restored one of his Group A Toyota Corolla FX-GTs to race in the Australian Heritage Touring Car Championship for historic Group C and Group A touring cars. Holden is also involved in charity work, helping disadvantaged youth acquire trade skills to help establish themselves in society.

== Career results ==
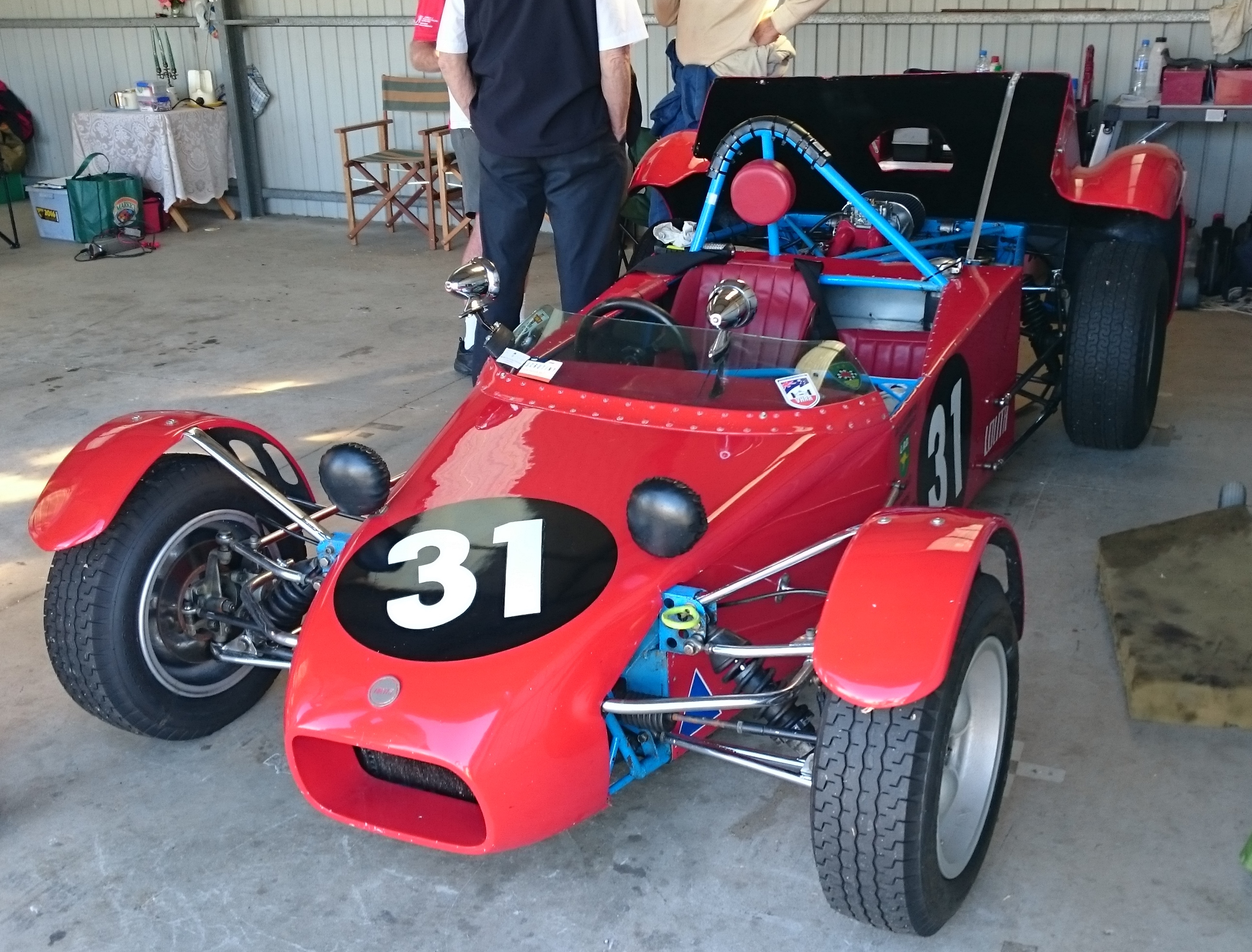
Holden won the Up to 1100cc class at the 1966 Australian Tourist Trophy driving a Lolita. The car is pictured in 2018.

Season	Title	Position	Car	Team
1961	Australian Touring Car Championship	5th	Holden FJ	
1962	Australian Touring Car Championship	7th	Peugeot 403	
1963	Australian Drivers' Championship	12th	Lynx-Peugeot	Killara Motor Garage
1966	Australian Tourist Trophy (Up to 1100cc class)	1st	Lolita	
1966	Australian Touring Car Championship	8th	Morris Cooper S	BMC Australia Pty Ltd
1972	Australian Touring Car Championship	4th	Ford Escort Twin Cam	Dr Allan Hogan
1973	Australian Formula 2 Championship	12th	Brabham BT36 Ford	
1973	Australian Touring Car Championship	4th	Ford Escort Twin Cam	
1974	Australian Touring Car Championship	4th	Ford Escort Twin Cam	Brian Byrt Ford
1975	Australian Touring Car Championship	3rd	Ford Escort Twin Cam; Ford Escort RS2000	Bob Holden Shell Racing
1976	Australian Touring Car Championship	16th	Ford Escort RS2000	Bob Holden Motors
1976	Goodrich Radial Challenge	7th	Ford Escort RS2000	Bob Holden Shell Sport
1976	Rothmans Sun-7 Series	8th	Ford Escort RS2000	
1981	Better Brakes 3.5 Litre Series	11th	Ford Escort RS2000	Bob Holden Motors
1982	Australian Touring Car Championship	2nd	Ford Escort RS2000	Bob Holden Motors
1982	Australian Endurance Championship	2nd	Ford Escort RS2000	Bob Holden Motors
1983	Australian Touring Car Championship	20th	Ford Escort RS2000	Bob Holden Motors
1985	Australian Touring Car Championship	10th	Toyota Sprinter	Bob Holden Motors
1986	Australian 2.0 Litre Touring Car Championship	3rd	Toyota Sprinter	Bob Holden Motors
1986	Australian Touring Car Championship	19th	Toyota Sprinter	Bob Holden Motors
1987	Australian 2.0 Litre Touring Car Championship	6th	Toyota Sprinter	Bob Holden Motors
1993	Australian 2.0 Litre Touring Car Championship	7th	Toyota Sprinter	Bob Holden Motors
1993	Australian Touring Car Championship	20th	Toyota Sprinter	Bob Holden Motors
1994	Australian Manufacturers' Championship	10th	Toyota Sprinter	Bob Holden Motors
1995	Australian Super Touring Championship	20th	BMW M3	Bob Holden Motors
1996	Australian Super Touring Championship	18th	BMW M3	Bob Holden Motors
1998	Australian Super Touring Championship	20th	BMW 318i	Bob Holden Motors
2010	Australian Production Car Championship	12th	Toyota Yaris	Bezcorp Security
2013	Australian Heritage Touring Car Championship Group A	7th	Toyota Corolla AE82 FX-GT	Bob Holden Motors
2014	Australian Heritage Touring Car Championship Group A	7th	Toyota Corolla AE82 FX-GT	Bob Holden Motors
2015	Australian Heritage Touring Car Championship Group A	7th	Toyota Corolla AE82 FX-GT	Bob Holden Motors

=== Complete Australian Touring Car Championship results ===
(key) (Races in bold indicate pole position) (Races in italics indicate fastest lap)

Year	Team	Car	1	2	3	4	5	6	7	8	9	10	11	12	13	14	15	16	17	18	DC	Points
1972	Dr. Allan Hogan	Ford Escort Twin Cam Mk.I	SYM; Ret	CAL; 7	BAT; 11	SAN; 9	AIR; 7	WAR; 7	SUR; Ret	ORA; 9											4th	37
1973	Bob Holden	Ford Escort Twin Cam	SYM	CAL	SAN; 13	WAN; Ret	SUR; 11	AIR; Ret	ORA; 10	WAR; 7											4th	23
1974	Bryan Byrt Ford	Ford Escort GT1600	SYM	CAL; 11	SAN; 8	AMA; 10	ORA; 2	SUR; Ret	AIR; 13												4th	34
1975	Shell/Bob Holden Motors	Ford Escort Twin Cam	SYM; 11	CAL; 12	AMA; 9	ORA; 13	SUR; 12	SAN	AIR; 8	LAK; 7											3rd	60
1976	Bob Holden Motors	Ford Escort Mark I RS2000	SYM; 12	CAL; Ret	ORA; 18	ORA; 15	SAN; 14	AMA; 10	AMA; 11	AIR; 15	AIR; 14	LAK	LAK	SAN	AIR	SUR	PHI				16th	9
1977	Bob Holden Motors	Ford Escort RS2000	SYM	SYM	CAL	ORA	AMA	SAN	AIR	LAK	SAN	AIR	SUR; 11	PHI							NC	0
1982	Bob Holden Motors Manly Vale	Ford Escort Mk.II	SAN	SAN; Ret	CAL; 10	SYM; 8	ORA; 12	LAK; 8	WAN; 10	AIR; 12	SUR; 10										2nd	36
1985	Bob Holden Motors	Toyota Sprinter	WIN; 8	SAN; 15	SYM; 11	WAN; 12	AIR; 14	CAL; 14	SUR; 15	LAK	AMA; 15	ORA; Ret									10th	72
1986	Bob Holden Motors	Toyota Sprinter	AMA; 11	SYM	SAN	AIR; 16	WAN	SUR	CAL; 19	LAK	WIN	ORA; 17									19th	25
1987	Bob Holden Motors	Toyota Sprinter Trueno AE86	CAL	SYM	LAK	WAN	AIR	SUR	SAN; Ret	AMA	ORA; Ret										NC	0
1988	Bob Holden Motors	Toyota Sprinter AE86	CAL; Ret	SYM; 16	WIN; 17	WAN	AIR	LAK	SAN	AMA	ORA										NC	0
1989	Bob Holden Motors	Toyota Sprinter AE86	AMA	SYM	LAK; Ret	WAN	MAL; 14	SAN; 20	WIN; 17	ORA; DNS											NC	0
1990	Bob Holden Motors	Toyota Sprinter AE86	AMA; DNQ	SYM	PHI	WIN	LAK	MAL	BAR	ORA												
1991	Bob Holden Motors	Toyota Sprinter	SAN; R1	SYM; R2	WAN; R3	LAK; R4	WIN; R5	AMA; R6	MAL; R7	LAK; R8	ORA; R9											
1993	Bob Holden Motors	Toyota Sprinter AE86	AMA; R1	AMA; R2	SYM; R3	SYM; R4	PHI; R5	PHI; R6	LAK; R7	LAK; R8	WIN; R9	WIN; R10	EAS; R11	EAS; R12	MAL; R13	MAL; R14	BAR; R15	BAR; R16	ORA; R17	ORA; R18		

=== Complete World Touring Car Championship results ===
(key) (Races in bold indicate pole position) (Races in italics indicate fastest lap)

Year	Team	Car	1	2	3	4	5	6	7	8	9	10	11	DC	Points
1987	Bob Holden Motors	Toyota Sprinter AE86	MNZ	JAR	DIJ	NUR	SPA	BNO	SIL	BAT; 23	CLD	WEL	FJI	NC	0

Sporting positions
Preceded by Barry Seton; Midge Bosworth	Winner of the Bathurst 500; 1966 (with Rauno Aaltonen)	Succeeded by Harry Firth; Fred Gibson
