= 1976 Goodrich Radial Challenge =

The 1976 Goodrich Radial Challenge was an Australian motor racing series open to Group C Touring Cars of up to 3000cc capacity. It was contested over four rounds, each being staged with a round of the 1976 Rothmans International Series. Cars were required to use street radial tyres provided by the series sponsor, BF Goodrich Australia.

The series was won by Bill Evans driving a Datsun 1200 Coupe.

== Series schedule ==
The 1976 Goodrich Radial Challenge was contested over four rounds.

Round	Circuit	Date	Winning driver	Car	Entrant
1	Oran Park Raceway	1 February	Peter Williamson	BMW 2002 tii	Peter Williamson Pty Ltd
2	Adelaide International Raceway	8 February			
3	Sandown Park	15 February			
4	Surfers Paradise International Raceway	22 February	Cancelled		

The meeting at Surfers Paradise International Raceway was postponed for one week due to heavy rain and the rescheduled meeting was cancelled after Saturday practice due to further rain.

== Class structure ==
Car competed in three classes:

- Class A: Up to 1300cc
- Class B: 1301 to 2000cc
- Class C: 2001 to 3000cc

== Points system ==
Points were awarded on a 10-9-8-7-6-5-4-3-2-1 basis for the first ten positions in each class at each round.

== Series results ==
Position	Driver	Car	Class	Entrant	Ora	Ade	San	Sur	Total
1	Bill Evans	Datsun 1200 Coupe	A	John Roxburgh Motors	8	10	10	-	28
2	Peter Williamson	BMW 2002 tii	B	Peter Williamson Pty Ltd	10	8	9	-	27
3	Laurie Nelson	Ford Capri V6	C	Laurie Nelson	8	10	8	-	26
4	Chris Brockoff	Mazda RX-3 Coupe	C	Andre Tuning	9	9	6	-	24
5	Jim Murcott	Ford Escort RS2000	B	Brian Wood Ford	9	7	7	-	23
=	Chris Heyer	Volkswagen Passat	A	Lennox Motors	9	6	8	-	23
7	Bob Holden	Ford Escort RS2000	B	Bob Holden Shell Sport	3	9	8	-	20
=	Lyndon Arnel	Ford Escort RS2000	B	Bob Holden Shell Sport	-	10	10	-	20
9	Max McGinley	Honda Civic RS	A	Max McGinley	7	9	3	-	19
=	Don Holland	Mazda RX-3	C		10	-	9	-	19
11	Bob Nissen	Ford Capri V6	C	G Foy	7	7	3	-	17
=	Ray Molloy	Morris Clubman GT	A	Ray Molloy Motors Preston	-	8	9	-	17
13	Peter Granger	BMW 2002 ti	B	RA Glazier	6	6	4	-	16
=	Bill Stanley	Ford Escort RS2000	B	Westline Ford Pty Ltd	5	5	6	-	16
15	Ian Wells	Honda Civic RS	A		10	5	-	-	15
16	Ben Penhall	Mazda RX-2	C	TB Penhall	6	6	2	-	14
=	Ian Chilman	Honda Civic	A	Ian Chilman	-	7	7	-	14
18	John English	Ford Escort Twin Cam	B		7	-	5	-	12
19	Ray Cutchie	Ford Escort RS2000	B	Ray Cutchie	4	4	2	-	10
=	Allan Grice	Mazda RX-3	C	Mazda House Racing	-	-	10	-	10
21	Chris Cole	Ford Capri V6	C	Chris Cole	-	8	1	-	9
=	Alan Guest	Holden Torana	C	Alan Guest	-	5	4	-	9
23	Caroline O'Shannessy	Morris Cooper S	A	Caroline O'Shannessy	3	3	2	-	8
=	Terry Daley	Ford Escort Twin Cam	B		8	-	-	-	8
25	Paul Older	BMW 3.0Si	C	Craven Mild Racing	-	-	7	-	7
26	Geoff Wade	Ford Escort RS2000	B		-	-	6	-	6
=	Greg Toepfer	Toyota Corolla	A		6	-	-	-	6
=	Robin Dudfield	Alfa Romeo GT 1300 Junior	A	Avanti Motors	-	2	4	-	6
29	Phil Harris	Ford Escort Twin Cam	B	Barry Lee	2	-	3	-	5
=	Arthur Crosthwaite	Morris Cooper S	A		-	-	5	-	5
=	Jeff Harris	Morris Cooper S	A		5	-	-	-	5
=	Hugh Donaldson	Morris Cooper S	A	Hugh Donaldson	-	4	1	-	5
=	Ray Harrison	Mazda RX-3	C		-	-	5	-	5
34	Frank Dortell	Morris Cooper S	A		4	-	-	-	4
35	Peter Kuebler	Alfa Romeo 1750 GTV	B	Peter Kuebler	-	3	-	-	3
36	Brian Porter	Mazda 1300	A		2	-	-	-	2
37	Jeff Ogg	Morris Cooper S	A		1	-	-	-	1
=	Kelvin Gough	Holden Gemini	B		-	-	1	-	1
