= 1966 Australian Tourist Trophy =

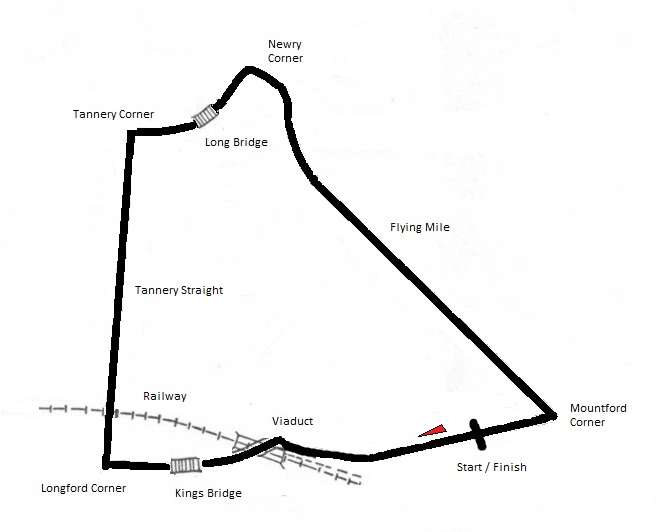
Layout of the Longford Circuit (1953-1968)

The 1966 Australian Tourist Trophy was a motor race staged at the Longford Circuit in Tasmania, Australia on 7 March 1966. It was the tenth annual Australian Tourist Trophy race. The race was open to sports cars as defined by the Confederation of Australian Motor Sport (CAMS) in its Appendix C regulations, and it was recognized by CAMS as the Australian championship for sports cars. It was won by Frank Matich driving an Elfin 400 Traco Oldsmobile.

== Results ==
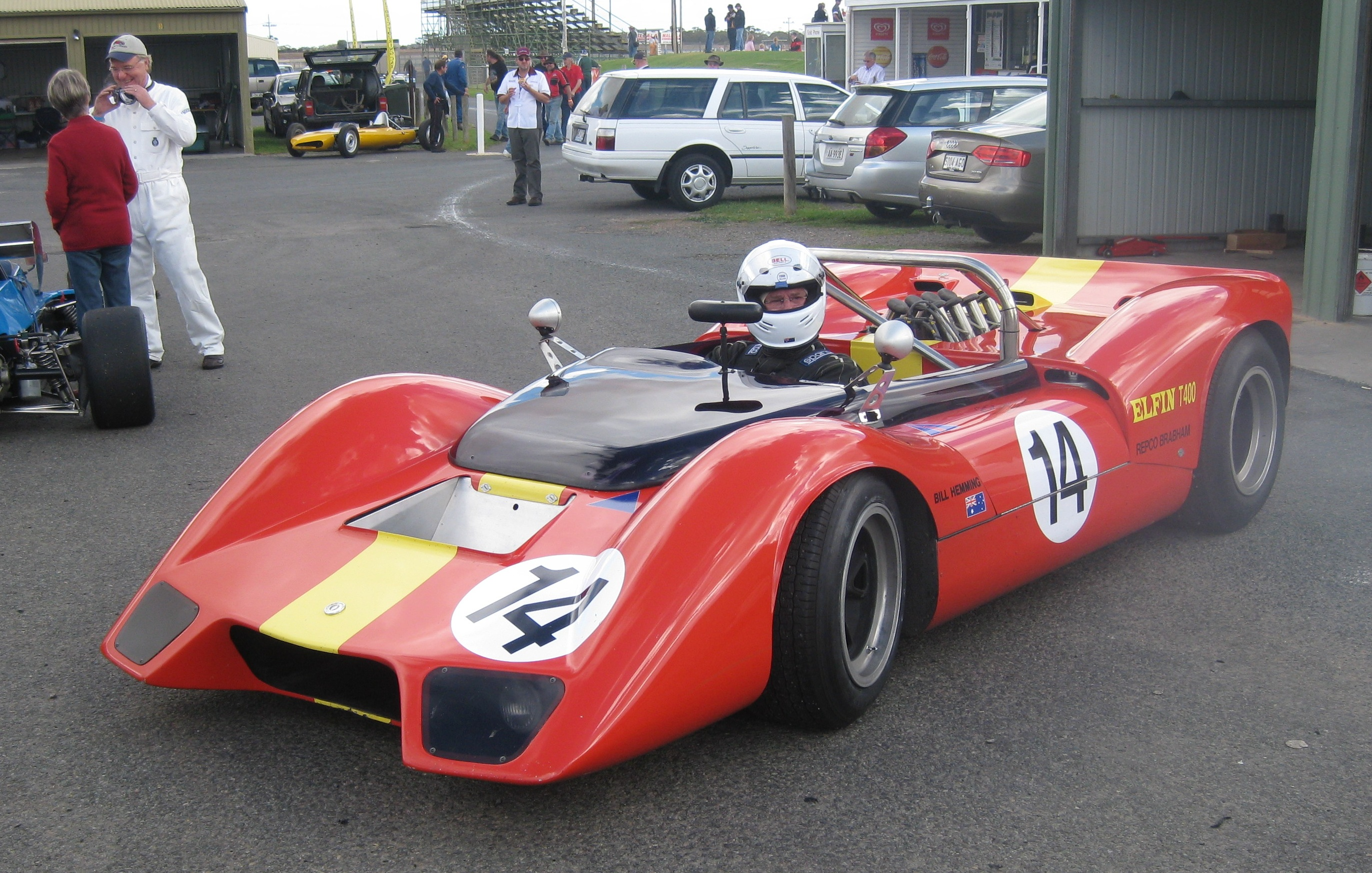
Frank Matich won the 1966 Australian Tourist Trophy driving an Elfin 400, similar to the example pictured above

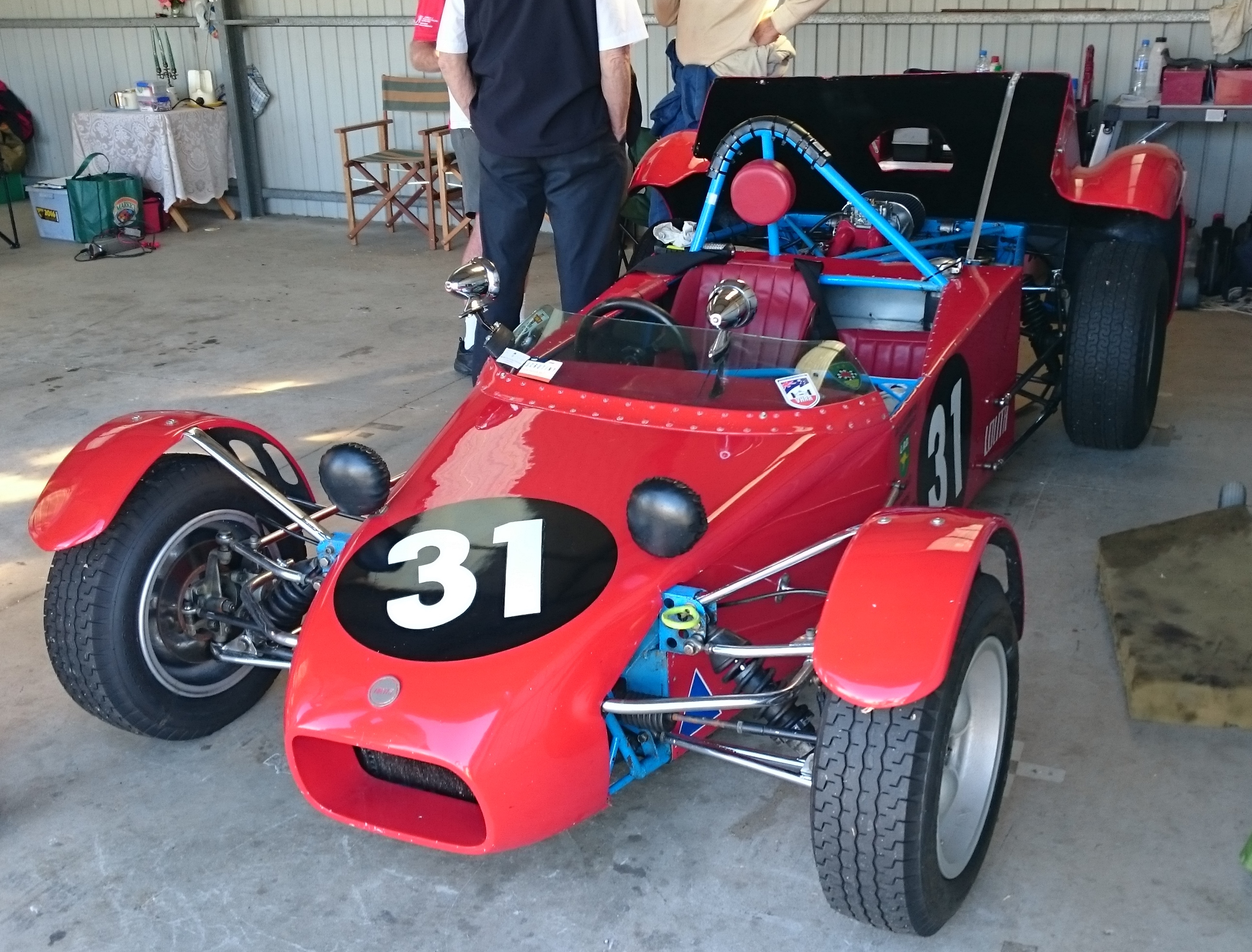
The Lolita won the Up to 1100cc class driven by Bob Holden. The car is pictured in 2018.

Position	Driver	No.	Car	Entrant	Class pos.	Class	Laps	Time / Remarks
1	Frank Matich	2	Elfin 400 Traco Oldsmobile	Laurie O'Neill Peterbilt	1	3001cc and over	23	60:40.4
2	Alan Hamilton	60	Porsche 904 Spyder	Porsche Distributors Pty. Ltd.	1	1501 to 2000cc	23	60:53.8
3	Spencer Martin	1	Ferrari 250LM	Scuderia Veloce	2	3001cc and over	23	61:22.3
4	Lionel Ayers	11	Lotus 23B	Motor Racing Components	1	1101 to 1500cc	22	
5	Dick Thurston	66	Monaco Oldsmobile	Pitstop Car Sales	3	3001cc and over	22	
6	Wally Mitchell	9	RM1	East Burwood Motors Pty. Ltd.	1	2001 to 3000cc	21	
7	Kerry Cox	28	Paramount Jaguar	Mowbray Shell Service Station	4	3001cc and over	20	
8	Bruno Carosi	19	Carosi B Type	Bruno Carosi	2	2001 to 3000cc	18	
9	Bob Holden	113	Lolita	Killara Motor Garage	1	Up to 1100cc	16	
10	Alan Ling	30	Lotus Super 7	Alan Ling	2	1101 to 1500cc	16	
11	Greg Ellis	52	MGA	Greg Ellis	2	1501 to 2000cc	14	
12	Paul Bolton	3	Lotus 23B	Town & Country Garage Pty. Ltd.	-	1101 to 1500cc	11	Gearbox
13	Frank Demuth	5	Lotus 23B	Lane Cove Auto Port	-	1101 to 1500cc	7	Head gasket
14	Steve Holland	23	Lotus 23B Ford	Team Harper	-		6	Brakes
15	Kevin Bartlett	47	Alfa Romeo GTA	Alec Mildren Racing Pty. Ltd.	-	1501 to 2000cc	6	Head gasket
16	John Stillard	13	Elfin	Motor Improvements	-	1501 to 2000cc	4	
17	Ross Ambrose	50	Elfin Ford Cortina	Ross R. Ambrose	-	1101 to 1500cc	3	
18	Bob Wright	111	Tasma 1500	Burnie Speed Shop	-	1501 to 2000cc	2	
19	Max Brunninghausen	32	Alfa Romeo Giulia TZ	Ralph Sach Motors	-	1501 to 2000cc	1	Head gasket
DNS	Les Howard	16	Lotus 23B	Howard & Sons Racing Team	-	Up to 1100cc	-	Engine failure

Race statistics:

- Race distance: 23 laps – 103½ miles
- Pole position: Frank Matich
- Number of starters: 19
- Fastest lap: Frank Matich - 2:28.7
- First Tasmanian: Kerry Cox (Paramount Jaguar)
