= Toyota Corolla (E80) =

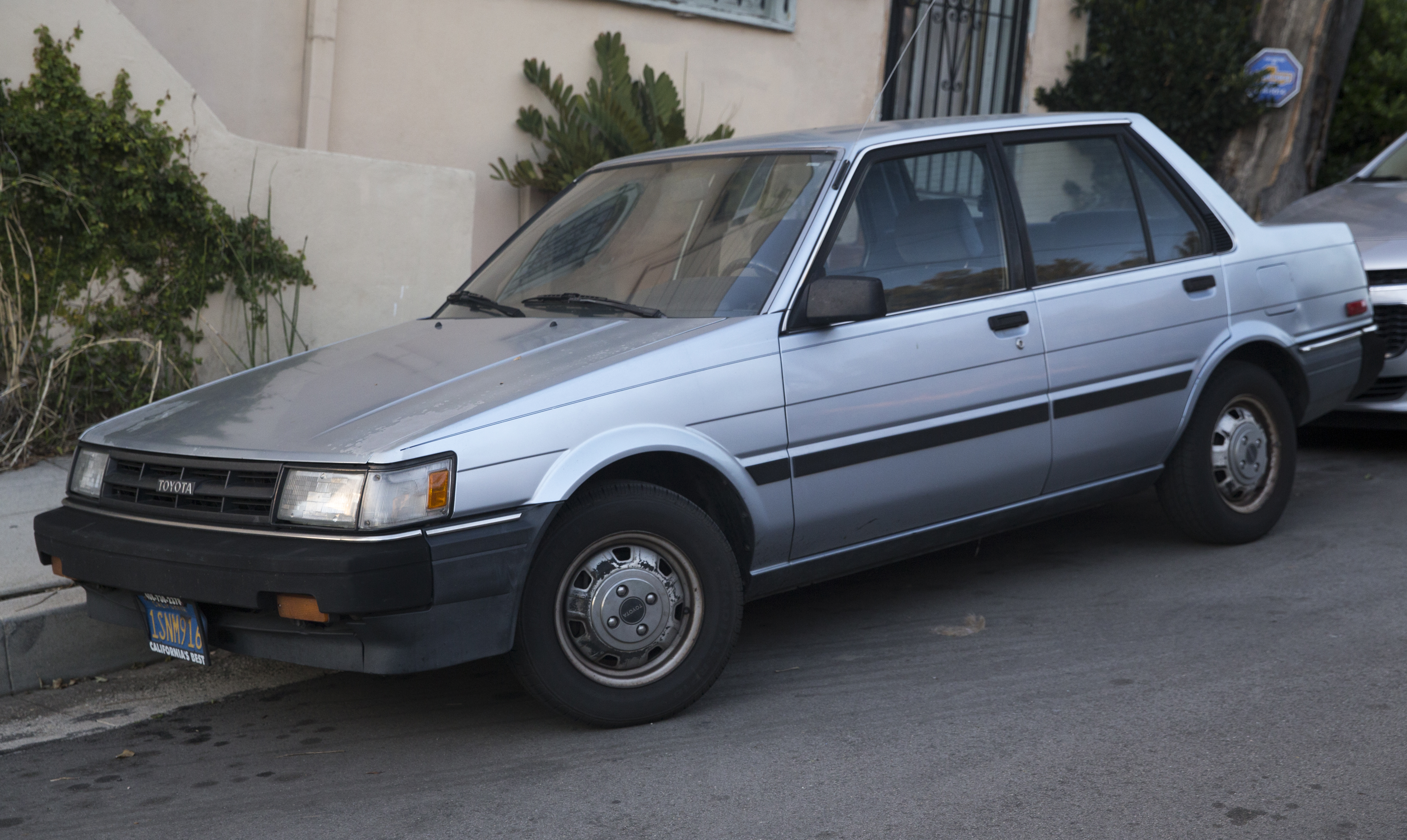

Overview
- Manufacturer: Toyota
- Model code: E80
- Also called: Corolla Levin/Sprinter Trueno AE85/86; Toyota Corolla Sprinter; Chevrolet Nova (North America)
- Production: 1983–1987; February 1985 – December 1988 (Australia); 1986–1990 (Venezuela)
- Assembly: Japan: Toyota City; Australia: Port Melbourne, Victoria; Indonesia: North Jakarta (Toyota Astra Motor); Malaysia: Shah Alam (UMW Toyota Motor); New Zealand: Thames; Philippines: Parañaque (TMP); South Africa: Durban; Thailand: Samut Prakan; United States: Fremont, California (NUMMI); Venezuela: Cumana, Sucre (AE82 Sedan)
- Designer: Fumio Agetsuma (1979)

Body and chassis
- Body style: 3/5-door hatchback (FX); 4-door sedan 4-door sedan (six-window); 5-door liftback 2-door coupé (RWD); 3-door hatchback coupé (RWD)
- Layout: Front-engine, front-wheel-drive / rear-wheel-drive

Powertrain
- Engine: 1.3 L 2A I4 (AE80); 1.3 L 2E I4 (EE80); 1.5 L 3A I4 (AE81/85); 1.6 L 4A-C/E I4 (AE82/86); 1.6 L 4A-GE I4 (AE82/86); 1.8 L 1C-L diesel I4 (CE80)
- Transmission: 4/5-speed manual 3/4-speed automatic

Dimensions
- Wheelbase: 2,430 mm (95.7 in); 2,400 mm (94.5 in) (AE85/86)
- Length: 4,135 mm (162.8 in); FX: 3,970 mm (156.3 in); North America: 4,254 mm (167.5 in); FX: 4,064 mm (160.0 in)
- Width: 1,635 mm (64.4 in)
- Height: 1,328 mm (52.3 in); FX: 1,346 mm (53.0 in); FX16: 1,341 mm (52.8 in)
- Curb weight: 840–940 kg (1,852–2,072 lb)

Chronology
- Predecessor: Corolla E70
- Successor: Corolla E90

The Toyota Corolla E80 is a range of small automobiles manufactured and marketed by Toyota from 1983 to 1987 as the fifth generation of cars under the Corolla and Toyota Sprinter nameplates. Production totalled approximately 3.3 million, and most models adopted a front-wheel drive layout.

The AE85 and AE86 Corolla Levin and Sprinter Trueno (SR-5/GT-S in US) retained rear-wheel drive from the previous E70 generation, along with the three-door "liftback" (E72), three-door van (E70) and five-door wagon (E70) of the previous generation, which remained in production. The AE86 ultimately gained international prominence in drifting and wide popularity in Showroom Stock, Group A, and Group N, Rally and Club racing.

In a joint venture with General Motors, mildly restyled versions of the front-wheel drive AE82 sedan and liftback were locally manufactured and sold in the United States as the Chevrolet Nova.

== Design ==
The front-wheel-drive wheelbase was now 2,430 mm (95.7 in). This was the first Corolla to top the New Zealand top-ten lists, ending Ford's dominance of that market. A shorter hatchback range had been sketched by Chief Designer Fumio Agetsuma but had not been scheduled for production until Toyota of Australia's Marketing Director saw the sketch and requested it be produced. The additional sales promised from Australia and Europe prompted Toyota to enter it into production. This version was called the Corolla FX in Japan and the Corolla Compact in Germany; it arrived in October 1984 on the front-wheel-drive platform. The three- and five-door hatchbacks resembled the Corolla sedan with a truncated rear deck and trunk. Although there was a five-door liftback model of the longer Corolla sedan, the shorter FX hatchback was sold alongside it. The Corolla FX replaced the Toyota Starlet in North America.

A DOHC 16-valve engine, designated 4A-GE, was added in 1983 on the rear-drive cars. It was a 1.6 L (1,587 cc) inline-four and produced 124 PS (91 kW), turning the Levin/Trueno (Japan), Corolla GT coupé (Europe) and Corolla GT-S (North America) into a what was arguably a sports car. The three-door FWD hatchback was also available with this engine; it was known as the Corolla FX-GT in Japan and Corolla FX-16 in North America. This engine was also combined with the front-drive transaxle to power the mid-engined Toyota MR2.

The Sprinter sports cars, in two-door coupé and three-door liftback forms, were notable for being the line's first use of pop-up headlamps, which the equivalent Corolla Levin sports models did not have. The liftback has a drag coefficient of Cd=0.34.

Launched in Japan in May 1983, it reached Europe (including the right-hand drive UK market) three months later, and sold well in most European markets. The car was facelifted in May 1985, receiving larger headlights akin to those installed on the coupés. The smaller 1.3-litre A-series engine was replaced by the new 12-valve 2E unit at the same time for most markets.

== Japan ==
The 1.3-litre 2A engine was replaced by the more modern 12-valve 2E engine along with a May 1985 facelift at Toyota Corolla Store locations. The range began with the 1300 Custom DX and ended with the 1600 GT Limited, introduced in June 1986. The FX hatchback lineup was considered a semi-separate line and received a different nose and different equipment levels than its sedan and liftback counterparts. The 1.3 was not available in the FX, targeted at sportier buyers, until the 2E engine became available.

Japanese market engines:

- 2A-LU – 1.3 L (1,295 cc) I4, 8-valve SOHC, carb, 75 PS (55 kW) (AE80)
- 2E-LU – 1.3 L (1,296 cc) I4, 12-valve SOHC, carb (EE80)
- 3A-LU – 1.5 L (1,452 cc) I4, 8-valve SOHC, carb, transverse mount, 83 PS (61 kW) (AE81)
- 3A-U – 1.5 L (1,452 cc) I4, 8-valve SOHC, carb, 83 PS (61 kW) (AE85, RWD)
- 4A-ELU – 1.6 L (1,587 cc) I4, 8-valve SOHC, EFI, 100 PS (74 kW) (AE82)
- 4A-GELU – 1.6 L (1,587 cc) I4, 16-valve DOHC, EFI, 130 PS (96 kW) (AE82)
- 4A-GEU – 1.6 L (1,587 cc) I4, 16-valve DOHC, EFI, 130 PS (96 kW) (AE86, RWD)
- 1C-L – 1.8 L (1,839 cc) I4, diesel, Mechanical Injection (CE80)

Japanese market chassis:

- AE80 – FWD, 2A-LU engine, 4-door sedan (Custom DX, DX, GL, GL Saloon, Lime, SE), 5-door liftback (SX)
- AE81 – FWD, 3A-LU engine, 4-door sedan (DX, GL, GL Saloon, Lime, SE, SE Saloon), 5-door liftback (SX, ZX), 3-door hatchback (FX-D, FX-L, FX-L Lime), 5-door hatchback (FX-G, FX-L, FX-Lime, FX-SR)
- AE82 – FWD, 4A-ELU/GELU engine, 4-door sedan (GT, SR), 5-door liftback (SX, ZX), 3-door hatchback (FX-GT, FX-SR), 5-door hatchback (FX-SR)
- AE85 – RWD, 3A-U engine, 2-door coupé (Levin Lime, Levin GL, Levin SE), 3-door liftback (Levin SR)
- AE86 – RWD, 4A-GEU engine, 2-door coupé (Levin GT, Levin GT-APEX), 3-door liftback (Levin GT, Levin GT-APEX, Levin GTV)
- CE80 – FWD, 1C-L engine, 4-door sedan (DX, GL, GL Saloon, SE), 5-door liftback (SX), 3/5-door hatchback (FX-G, FX-L)
- EE80 – FWD, 2E-LU engine, 4-door sedan (DX, GL, SE, SE Saloon), 5-door liftback (SX), 3/5-door hatchback (FX-D, FX-L)
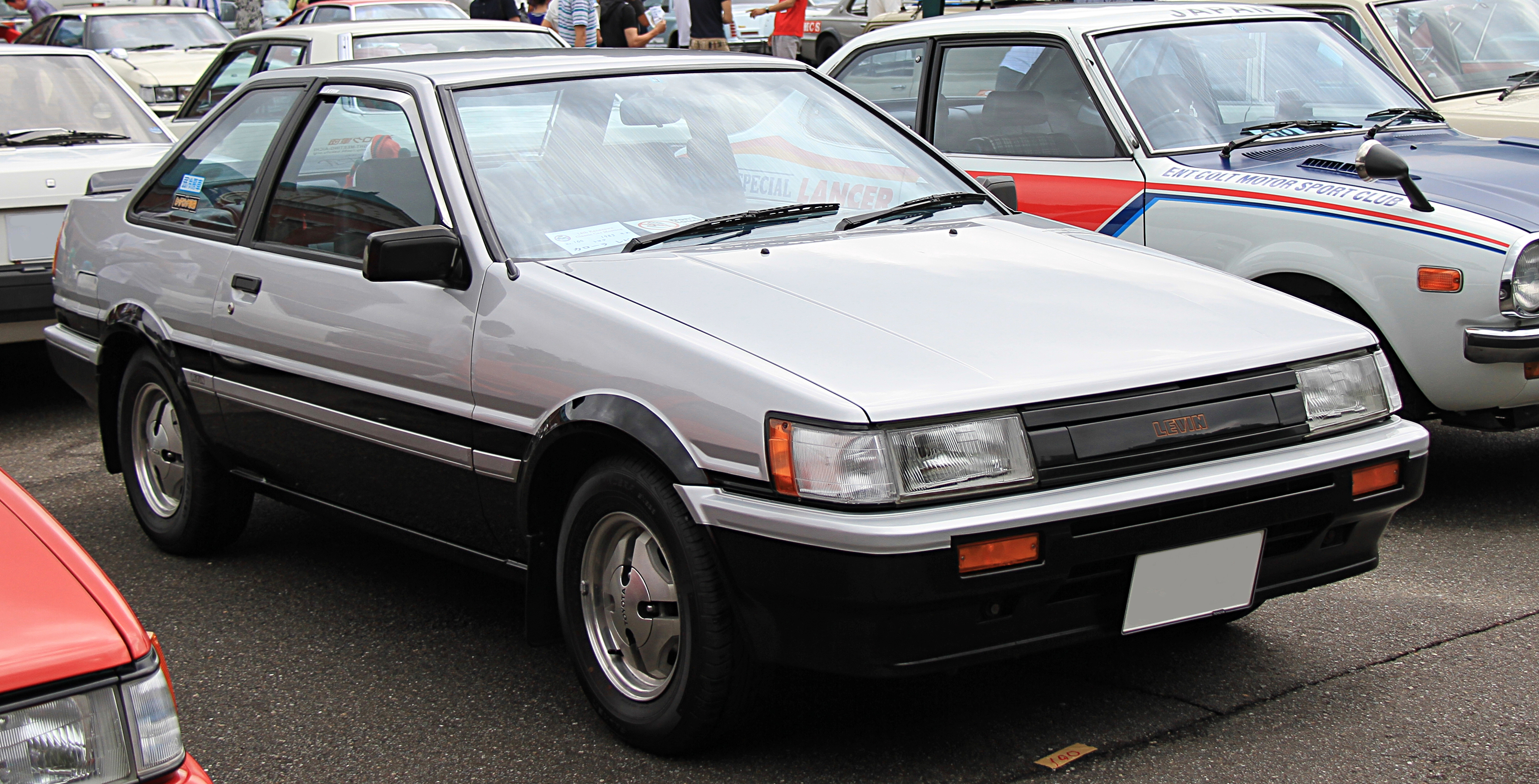
Toyota Corolla Levin 2-door coupé GT-APEX (AE86)

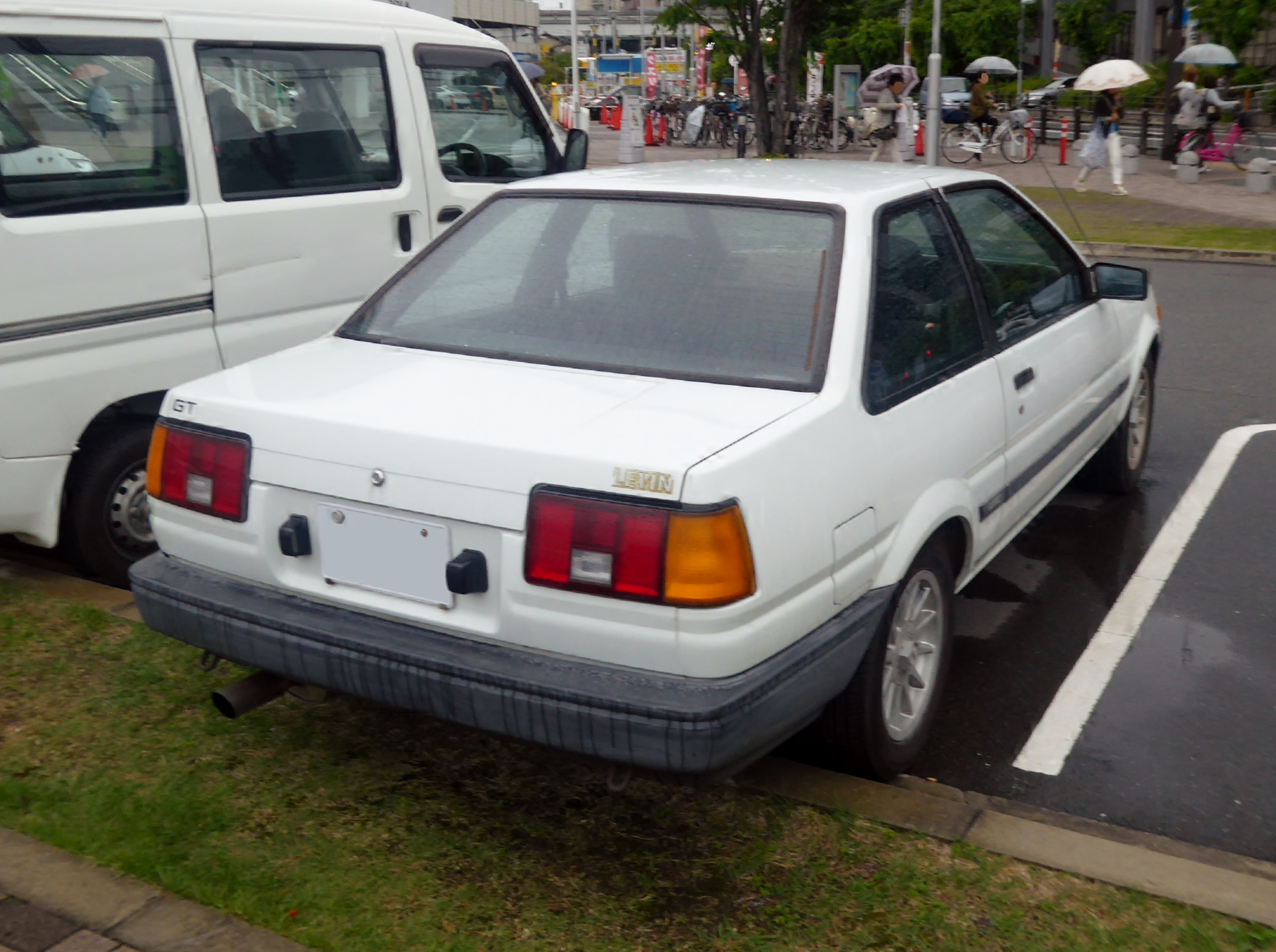
Toyota Corolla Levin GT 2-door coupé (AE86)

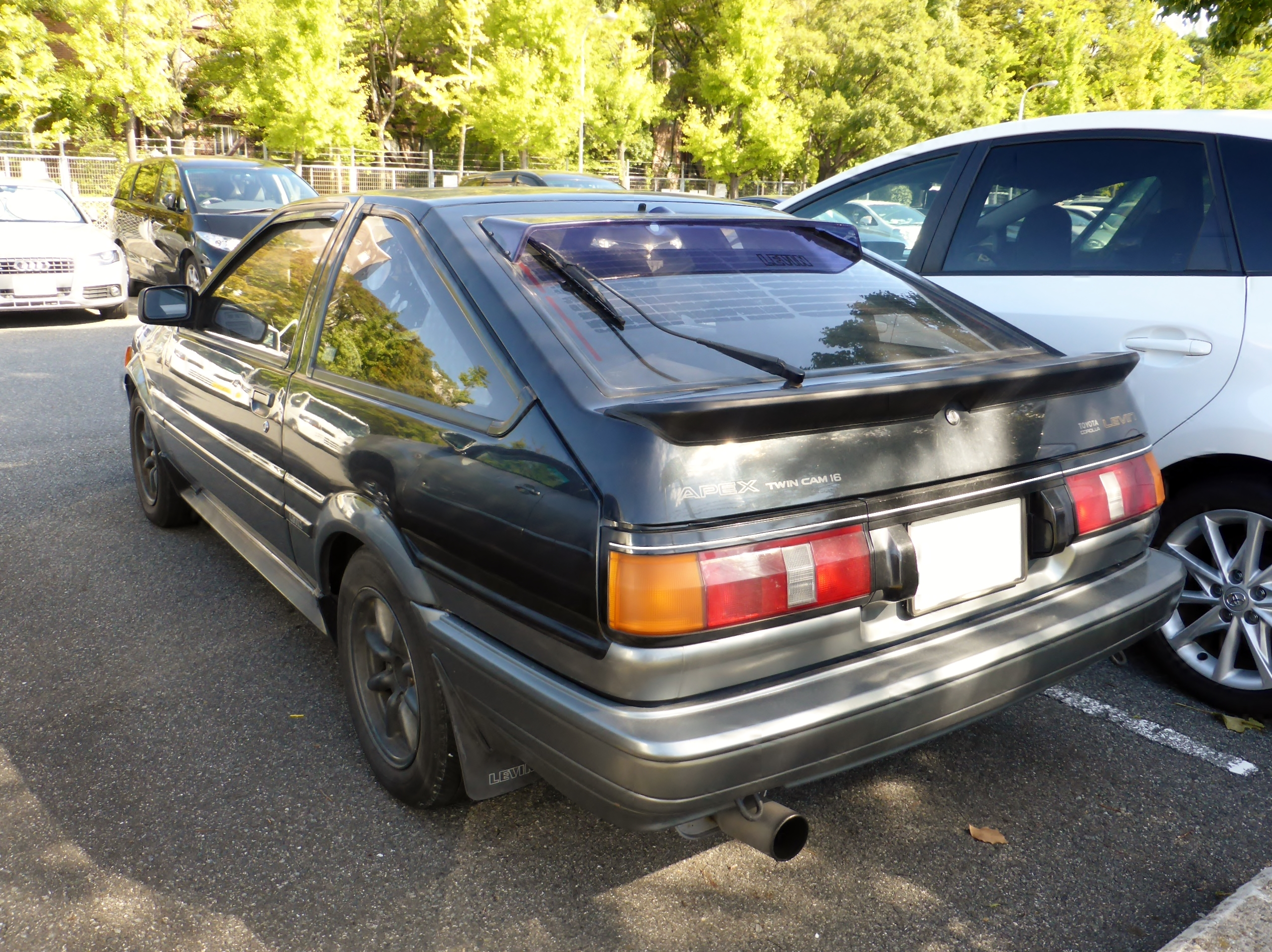
Toyota Corolla Levin GT-APEX 3-door liftback (AE86)

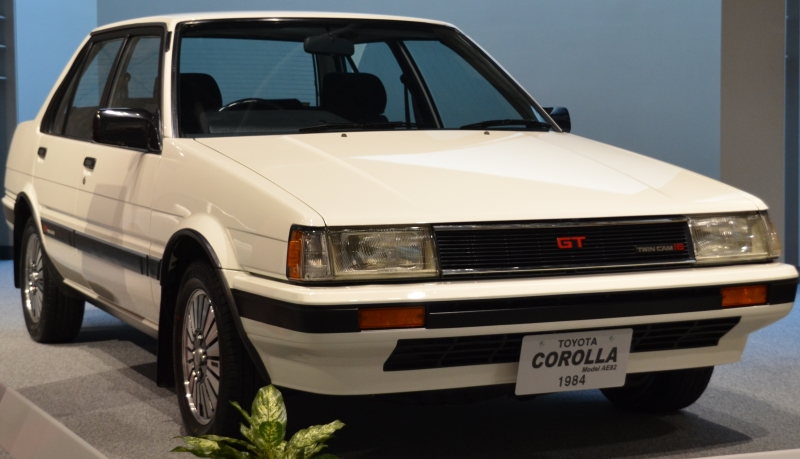
Toyota Corolla GT 4-door sedan (AE82)

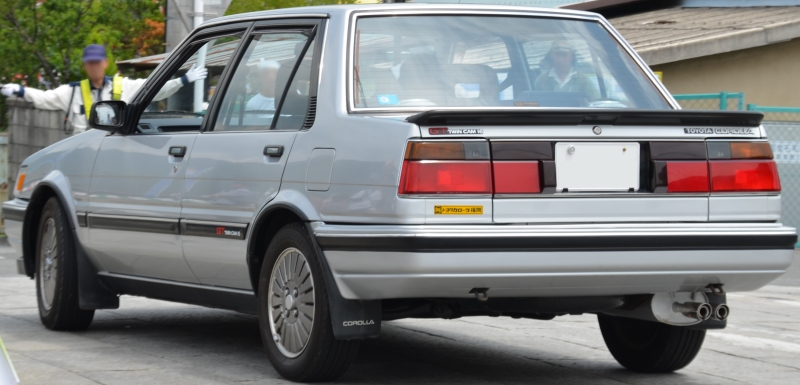
Toyota Corolla GT 4-door sedan (AE82)

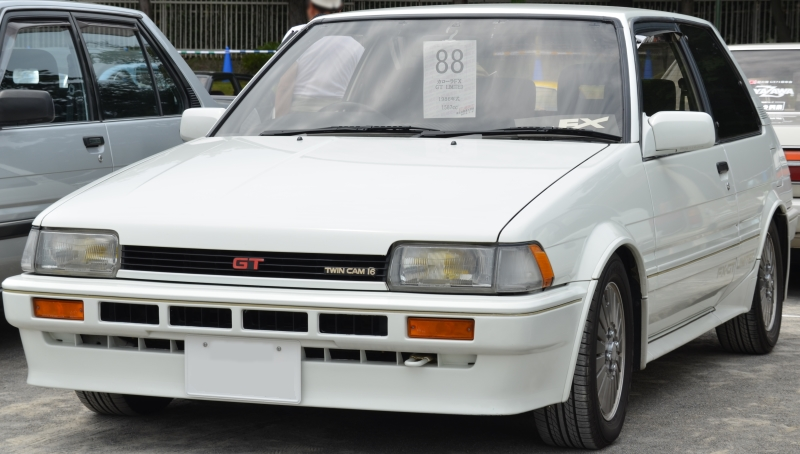
Toyota Corolla FX-GT 3-door hatchback (AE82)

== North America ==
The American specification was available with either SOHC or DOHC engines. From 1985 to 1988, NUMMI in Fremont, California built a rebadged version of the Sprinter sedan sold by Chevrolet as the Chevrolet Nova. During the 1985 calendar year, Corolla sedans and Sprinter-type 5-door hatchbacks (sold under both Nova and Corolla nameplates) were added, with the Toyota-branded US built cars gradually superseding imports from Japan and Nova hatchbacks being offered from the 1986 model year. The Corolla FX, including the sporty FX16 model, were also built at the NUMMI plant in California.

While all the rear-wheel drive 80-series Corollas were AE86 chassis in North America, the VINs differentiated between the three equipment levels: the DX got AE85, the SR-5 got AE86, and the GT-S received an AE88 VIN.

North American market engines:

- 1C 1.8 L I4, diesel, mechanical injection, 58 hp (43 kW) (1984–85)
- 4A-C 1.6 L I4, 8-valve SOHC, carb, 71–75 hp (53–56 kW)
- 4A-GEC 1.6 L I4, 16-valve DOHC, EFI, 112 hp (84 kW) in rear-wheel drive applications, 108 hp (81 kW) in the FX16

North American market chassis:

- AE82 – FWD sedan 4-door, 5-door hatchback (Std, LE, LE Ltd, SR-5, GT-S) 3-door hatchback (FX/FX16)
- AE86 – RWD coupé 2-door, 3-door liftback coupé

DX with 4A-C has "AE85" in VIN
SR-5 with 4A-C has "AE86" in VIN
GT-S with 4A-GEC has "AE88" in VIN

- CE80 – FWD sedan 4-door (low sales numbers)
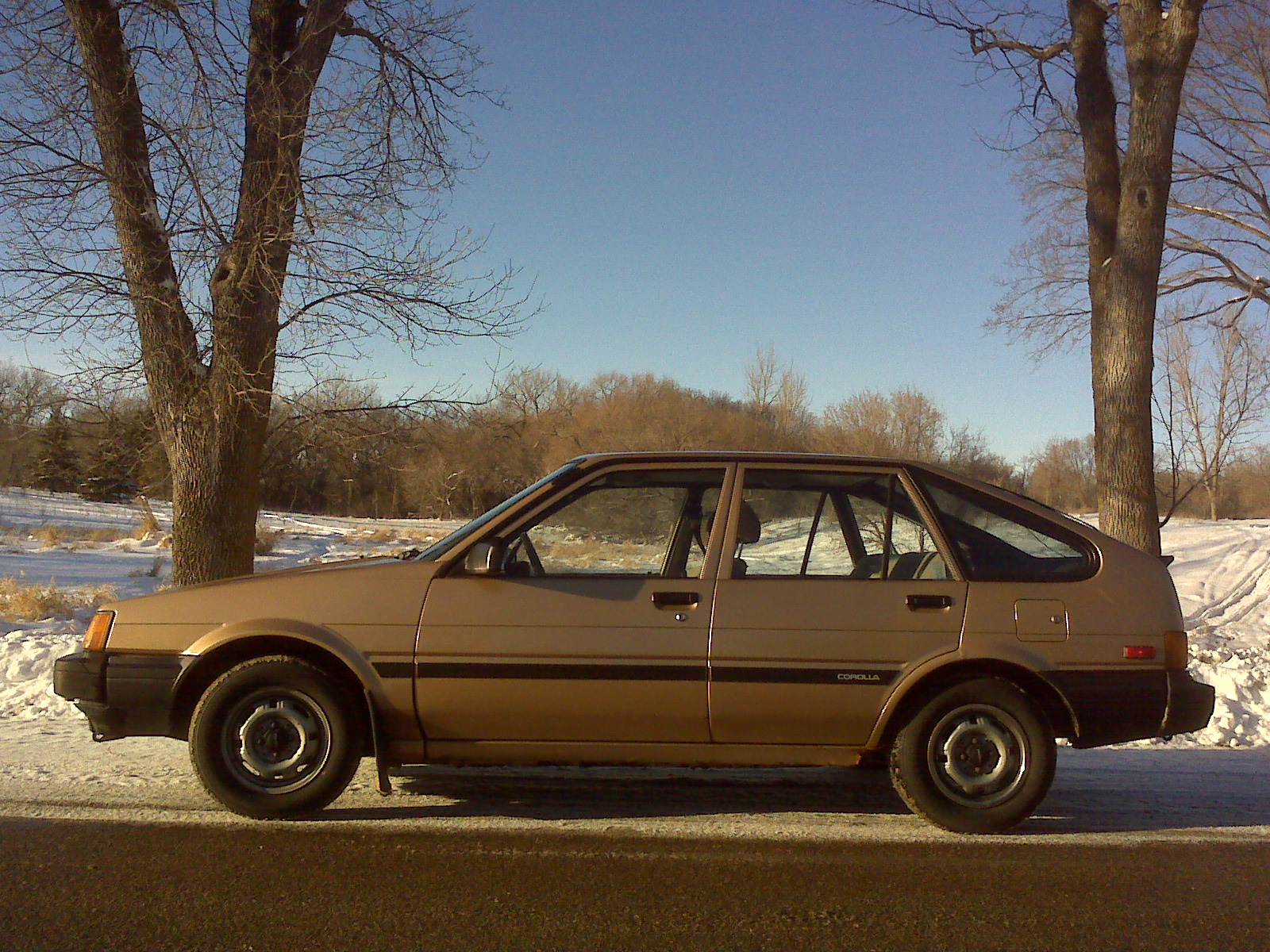
1984 Toyota Corolla DX Liftback (US)

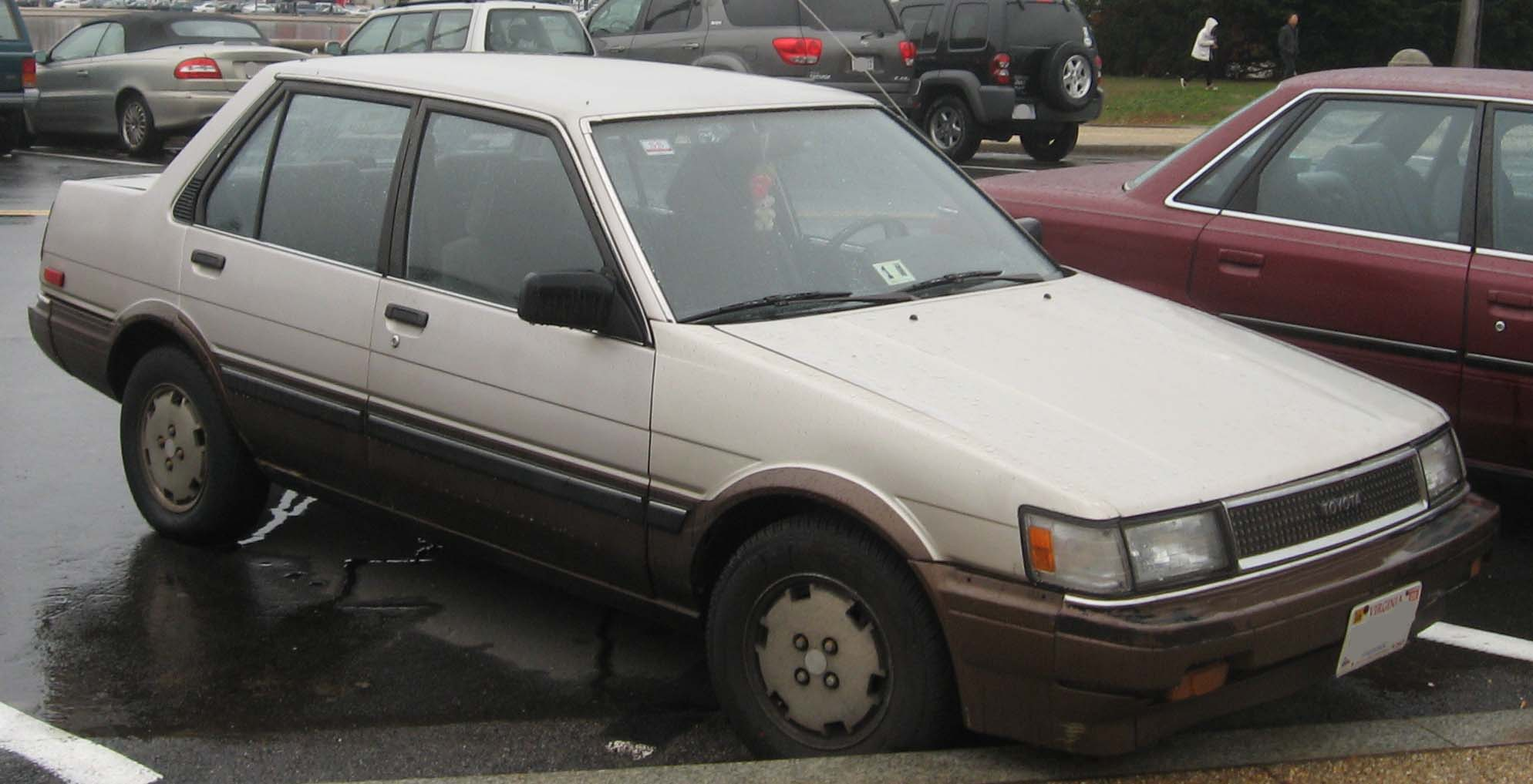
1986–1987 Corolla AE82 sedan (US)

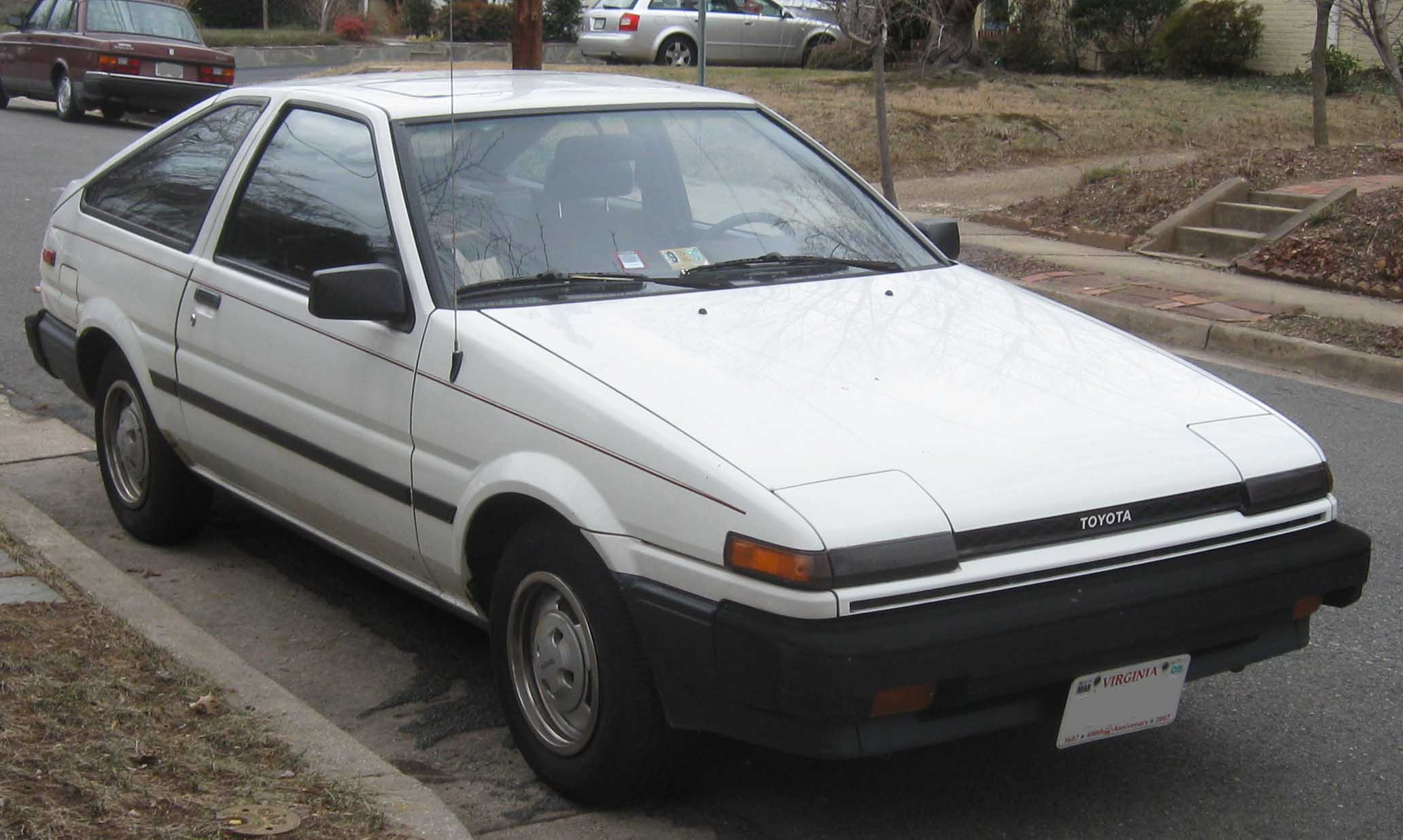
1986–1987 Corolla Sport SR5 hatchback (US)

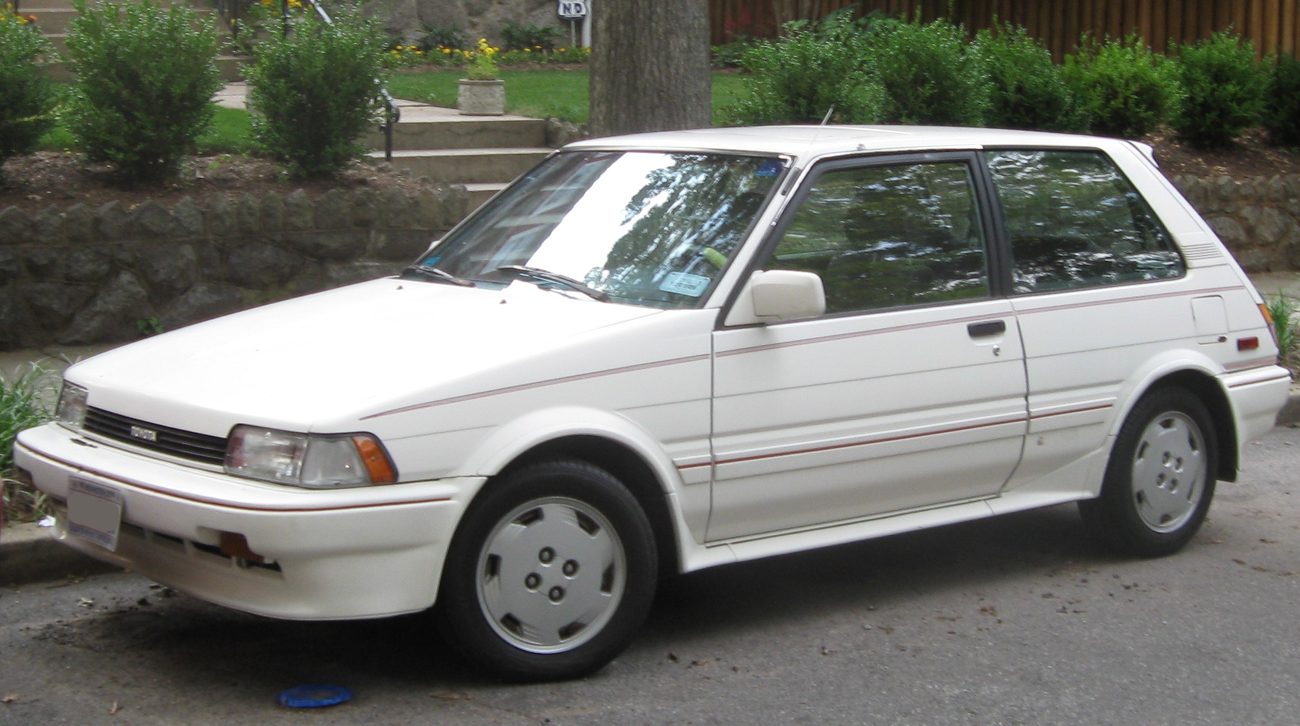
1987–1988 Corolla FX16 GT-S hatchback (US)

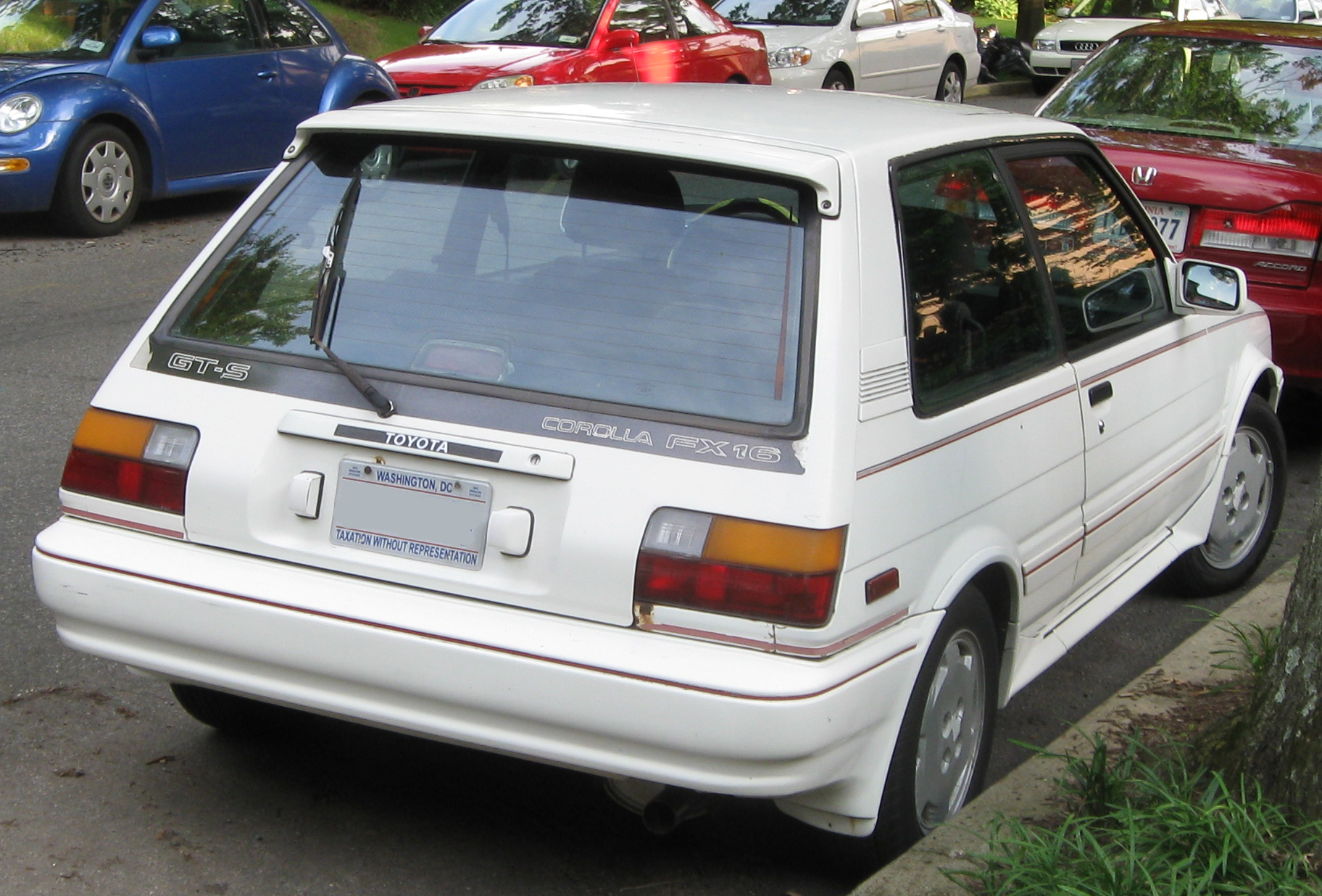
1987–1988 Corolla FX16 GT-S hatchback (US)

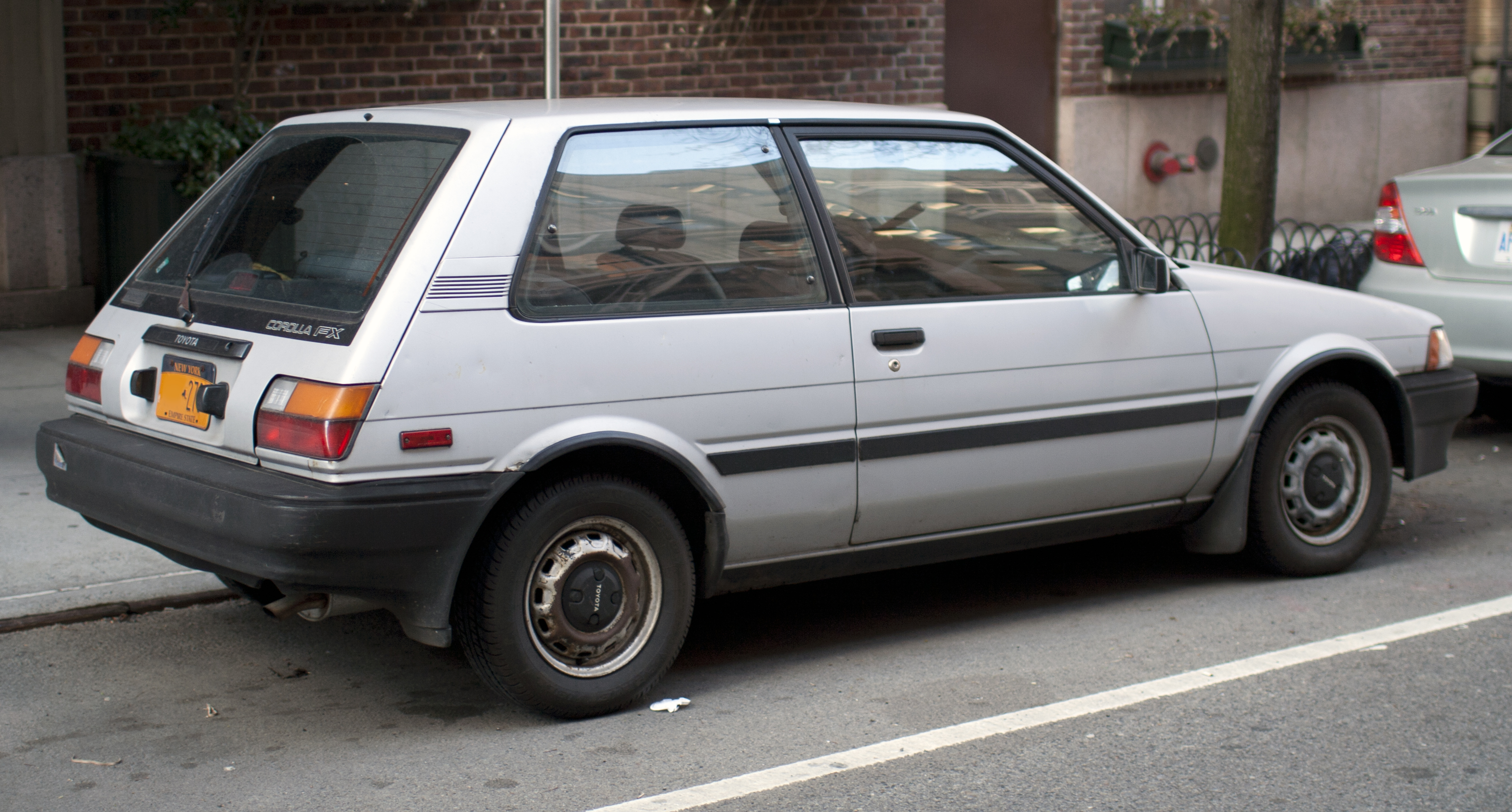
1987–1988 Corolla AE82 FX hatchback (US)

== Europe ==
European market engines:

- 2A 1.3 L I4, 8-valve SOHC, carb, 69 hp (51 kW)
- 4A 1.6 L I4, 8-valve SOHC, carb, 84 PS (62 kW)
- 4A-LC 1.6 L I4, 8-valve SOHC, carb, 78 PS (57 kW) (desmogged version for Sweden and Switzerland)
- 4A-GE 1.6 L I4, 16-valve DOHC, EFI, 116–124 PS (85–91 kW) (121 PS in the hatchback)
- 1C 1.8 L I4, Diesel, Mechanical Injection, 58 PS (43 kW)
- 2E 1.3 L I4, 12-valve SOHC, carb, 75 PS (55 kW)

European market chassis:

- AE80/EE80 – FWD 4-door sedan, 5-door liftback, 3/5-door hatchback (2A, 2E engines)
- AE82 – FWD 4-door sedan, 5-door liftback, 3/5-door hatchback (4A engine)
- AE86 – RWD 2-door coupé, 3-door hatchback coupé (4A engine)
- CE80 – FWD 1.8 diesel 4-door sedan, 5-door liftback, 5-door hatchback (1C engine)
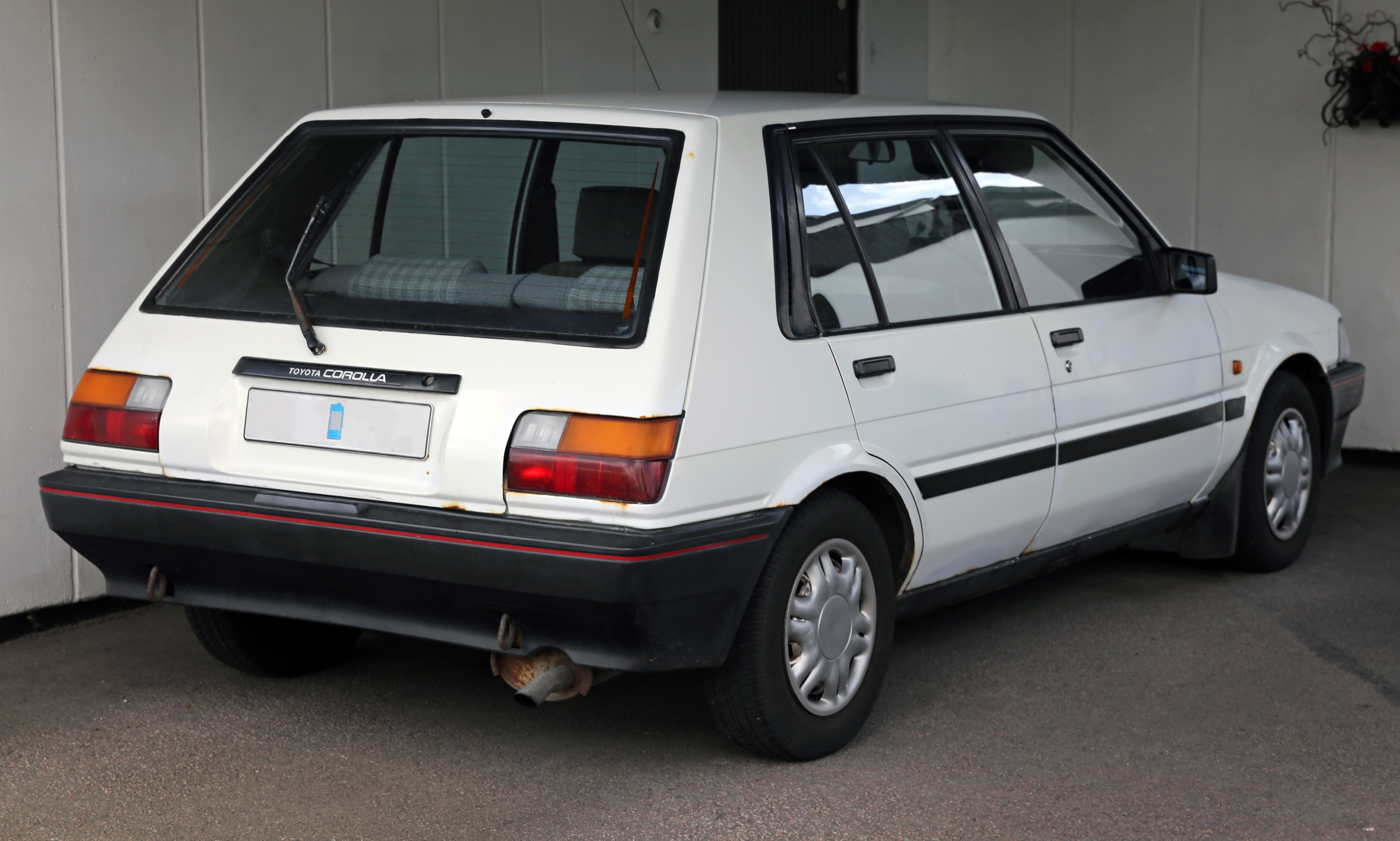
1986 Corolla (AE82) 5-door hatchback (Sweden)

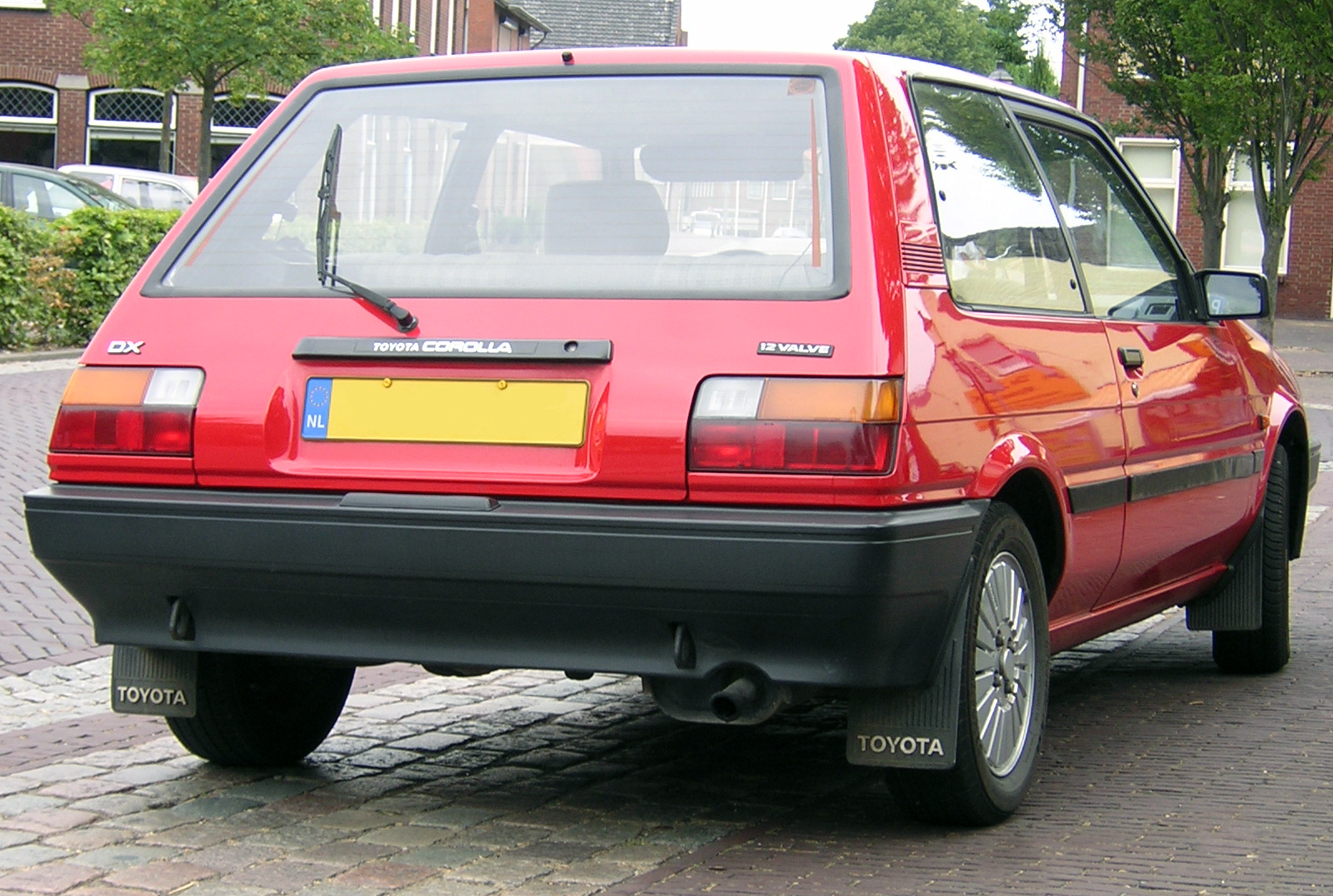
1985–1987 Corolla (EE80) XL hatchback (the Netherlands)

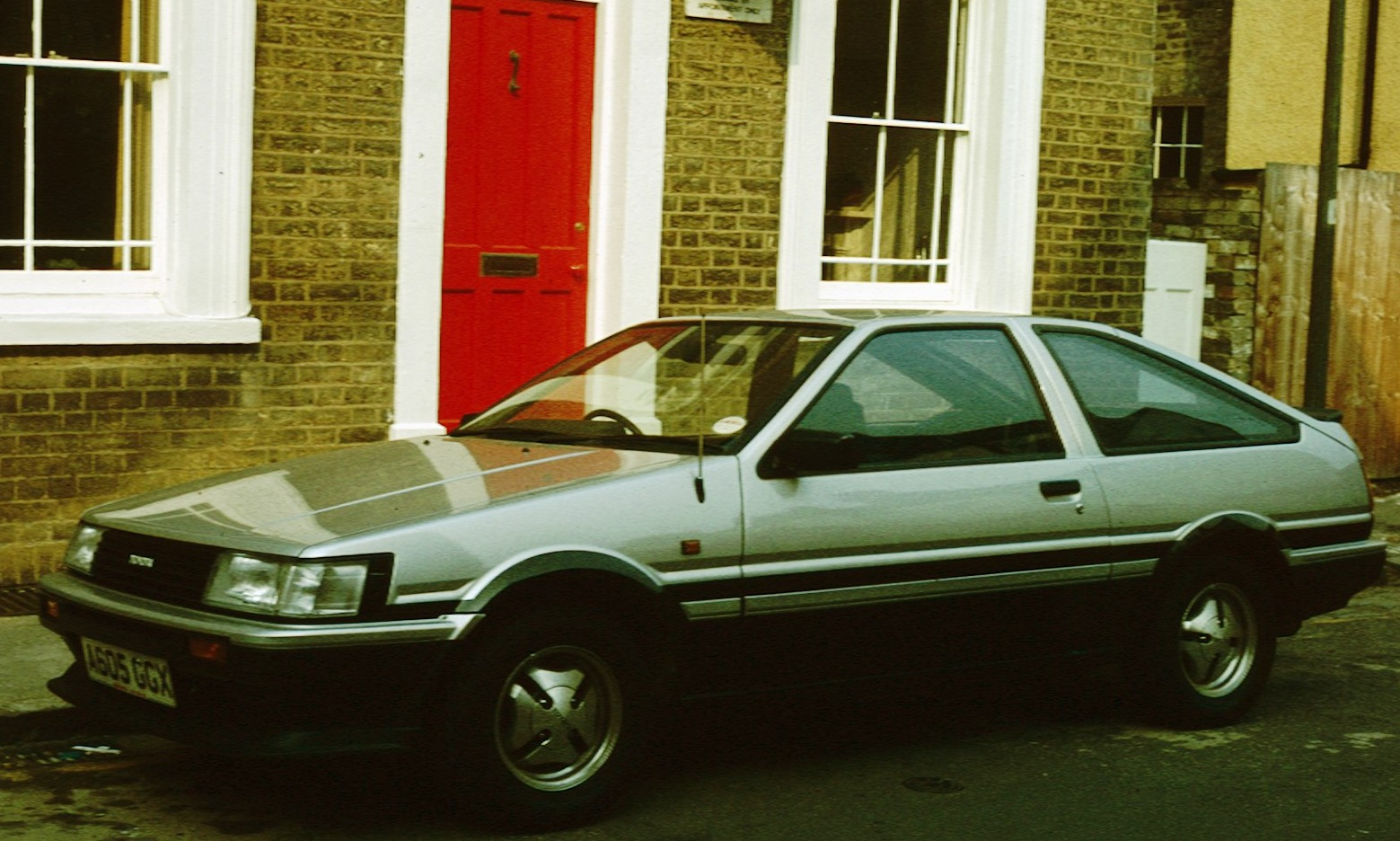
1983 Corolla (AE86) 3-door liftback (UK)

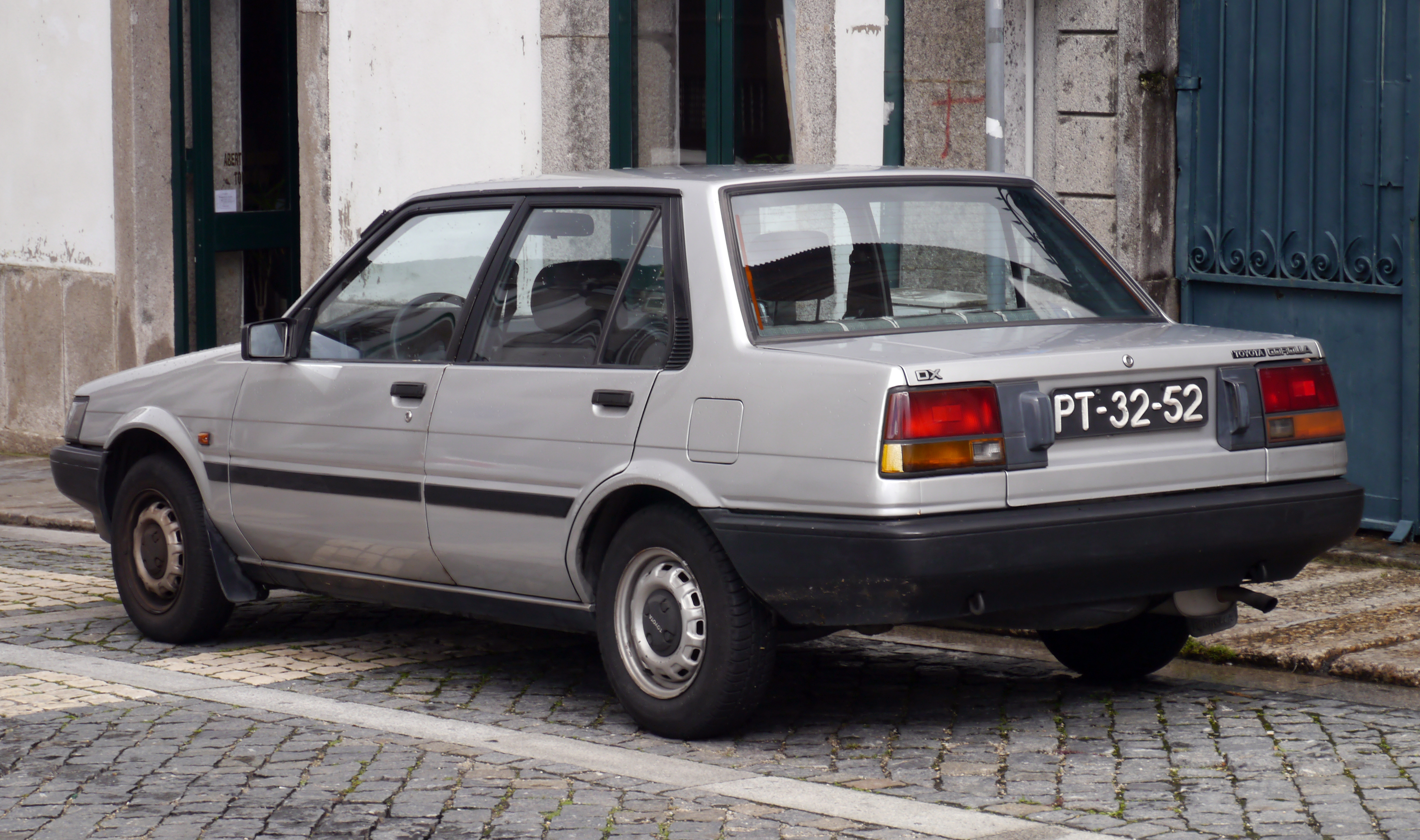
1986 Corolla (EE80) 1.3 DX sedan (Portugal)

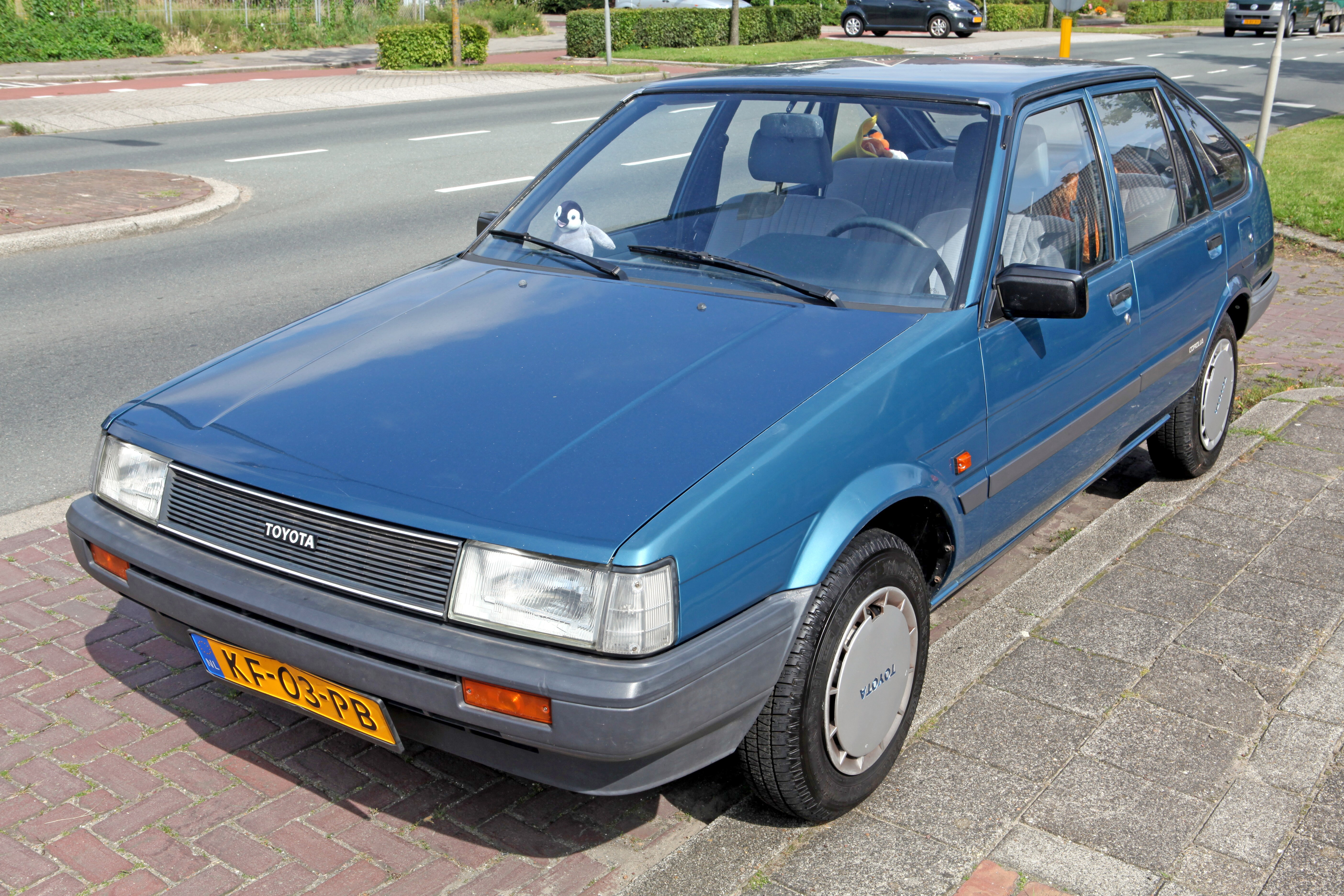
1983 Toyota Corolla (AE80) 1.3 GL 5-door liftback (the Netherlands)

== Australia ==
Australian market engines:

- 2A-LC 1.3 L I4, 8-valve SOHC, carb, AE80
- 4A-LC 1.6 L I4, 8-valve SOHC, carb, AE82 78 hp (58 kW)
- 4A-C 1.6 L I4, 8-valve SOHC, carb, AE86 78 hp (58 kW)
- 4A-GELC 1.6 L I4, 16-valve DOHC, EFI, 115 hp (86 kW) AE82 Twin Cam 16

Australian market chassis:

- AE80 – FWD 4-door sedan /5-door hatchback 2A-LC
- AE82 – FWD 4-door sedan /5-door hatchback /5-door Seca Liftback 4A-LC and 4A-GELC (Twin Cam 16 only)
- AE86 – RWD 3-door hatchback (badged as Toyota Sprinter) 4A-C

Australian market levels:

- 'S' This was the most basic version of the E80 Corolla. It came with only a driver's side door mirror, Corolla emblem where the analogue clock or tachometer would be, basic AM/FM radio, 4 speed manual or 3 speed automatic. AE80 hatch and sedan, AE82 hatch and sedan.
- 'CS' This was a more mid-level version with the inclusion of door pockets, 5 speed manual, an analogue clock in the combination meter, passenger-side door mirror and wheel covers. AE80 hatch and sedan, AE82 hatch, sedan and sēca liftback.
- 'CS-X' this was considered high range. They had included a tachometer in the combination meter, digital VFD clock in the dashboard, alloy rims, more seat adjustments, 4 speakers, and both door mirrors being remote controlled. AE82 sedan, hatch and sēca liftback.
- 'Twin Cam 16' This was the highest level. Different interior with a 3 spoke leather steering wheel and leather gear knob similar to the ones used in FX corollas and AE86s, alloy rims, fuel injected 4A-GELC engine, 5 speed manual transmission only, combination meter with tachometer, digital clock in dashboard. Hatch and sēca liftback only.
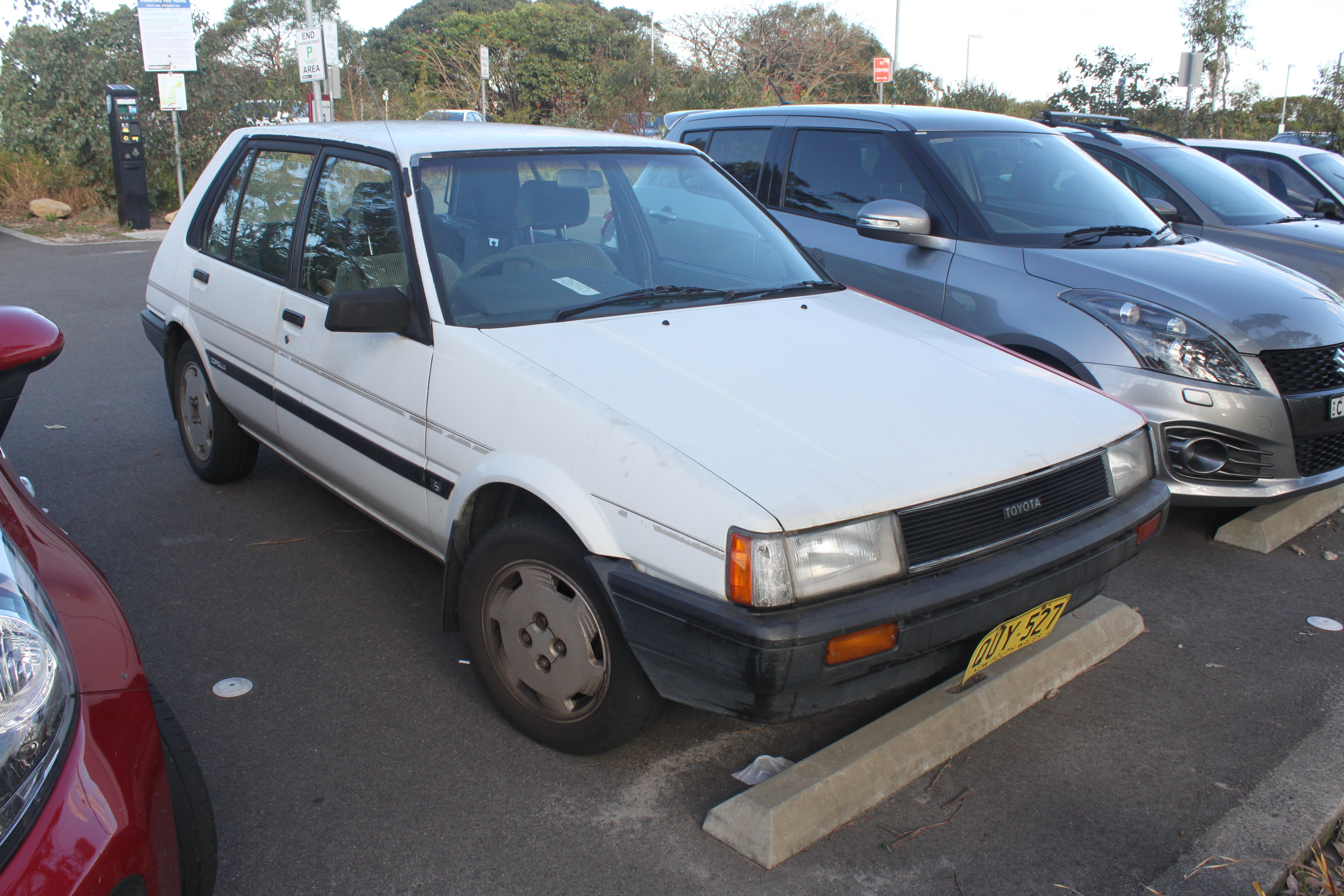
1985 Toyota Corolla (AE82) CS-X hatchback (Australia)

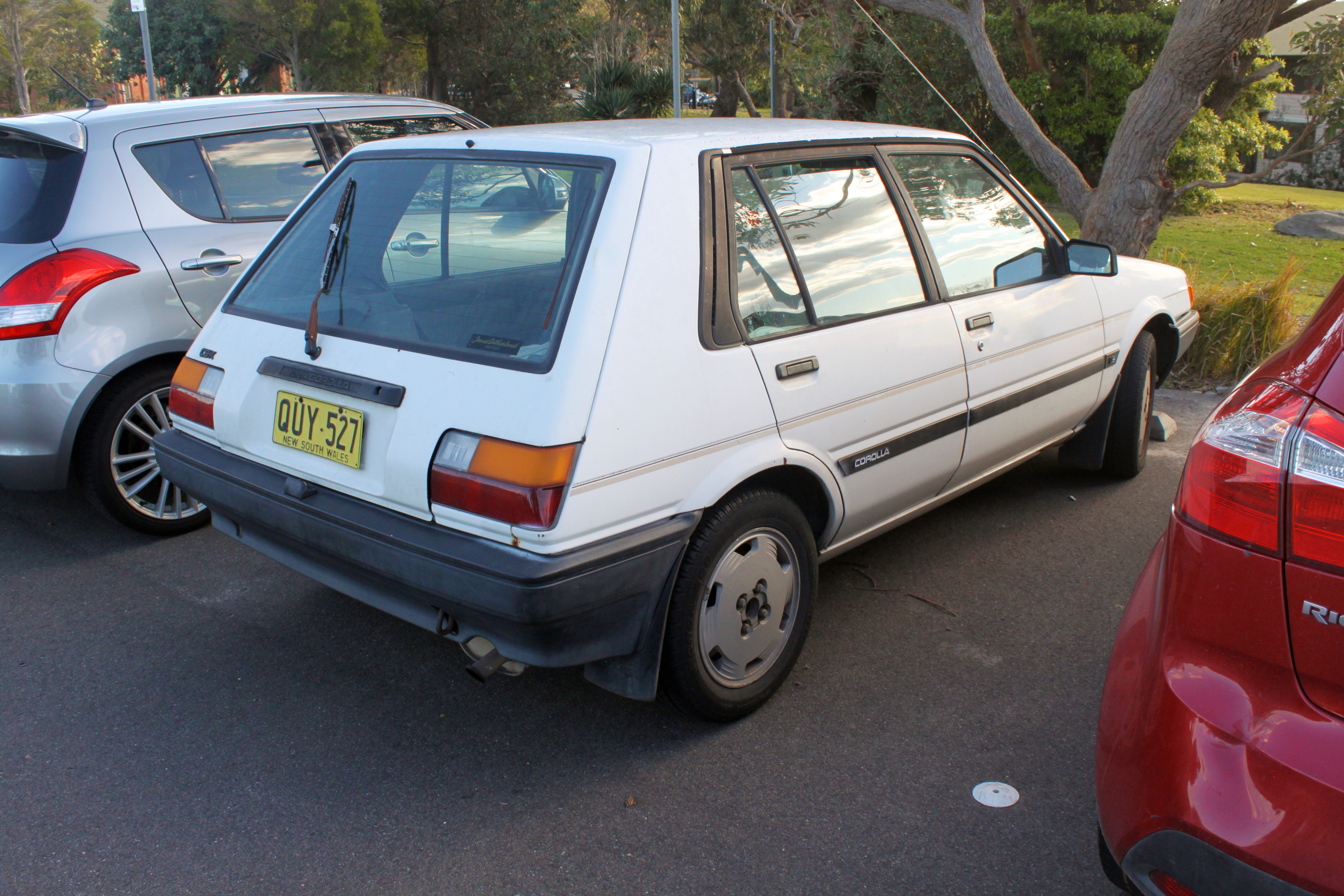
1985 Toyota Corolla (AE82) CS-X hatchback (Australia)

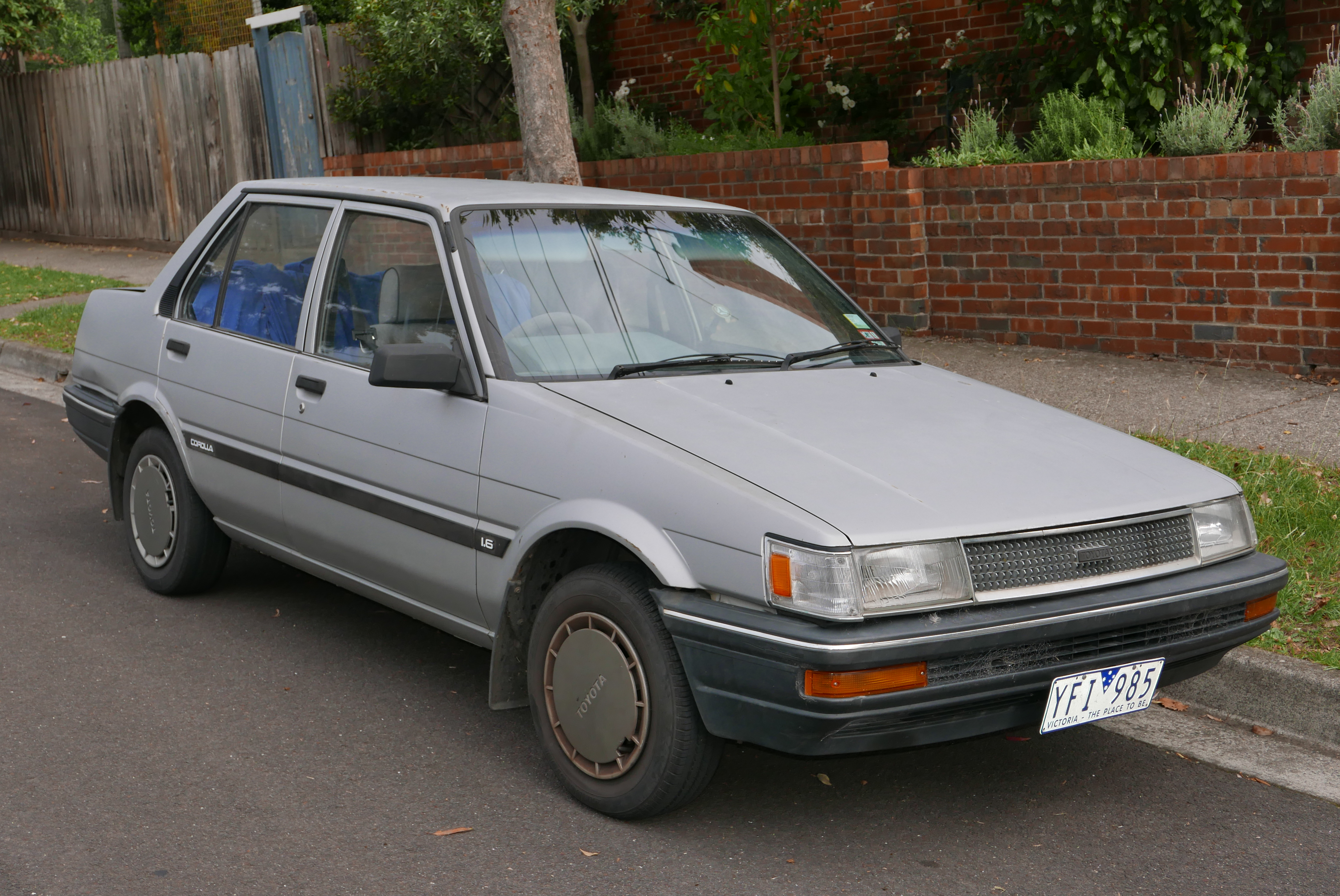
1987 Toyota Corolla (AE82) CS sedan (Australia)

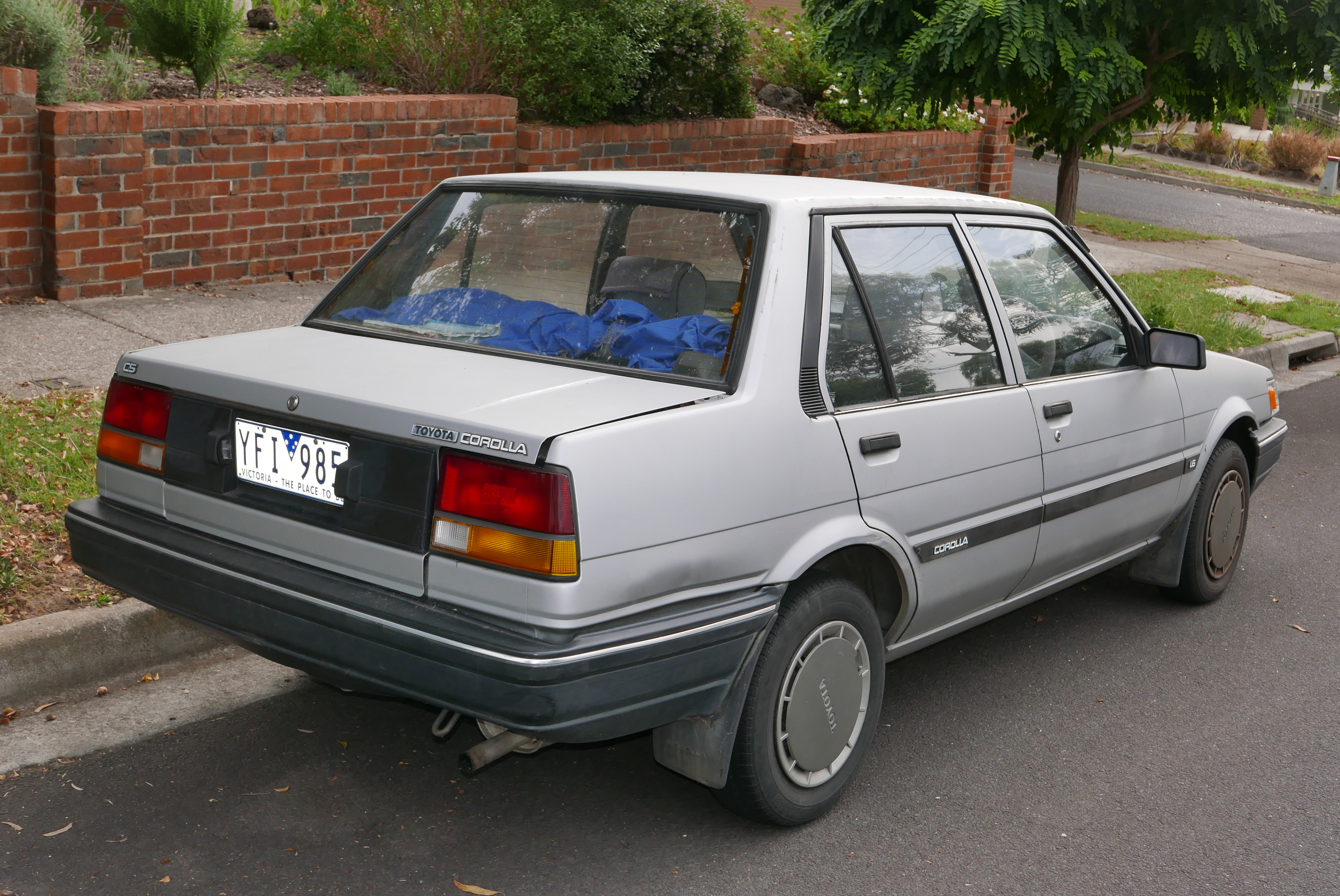
1987 Toyota Corolla (AE82) CS sedan (Australia)

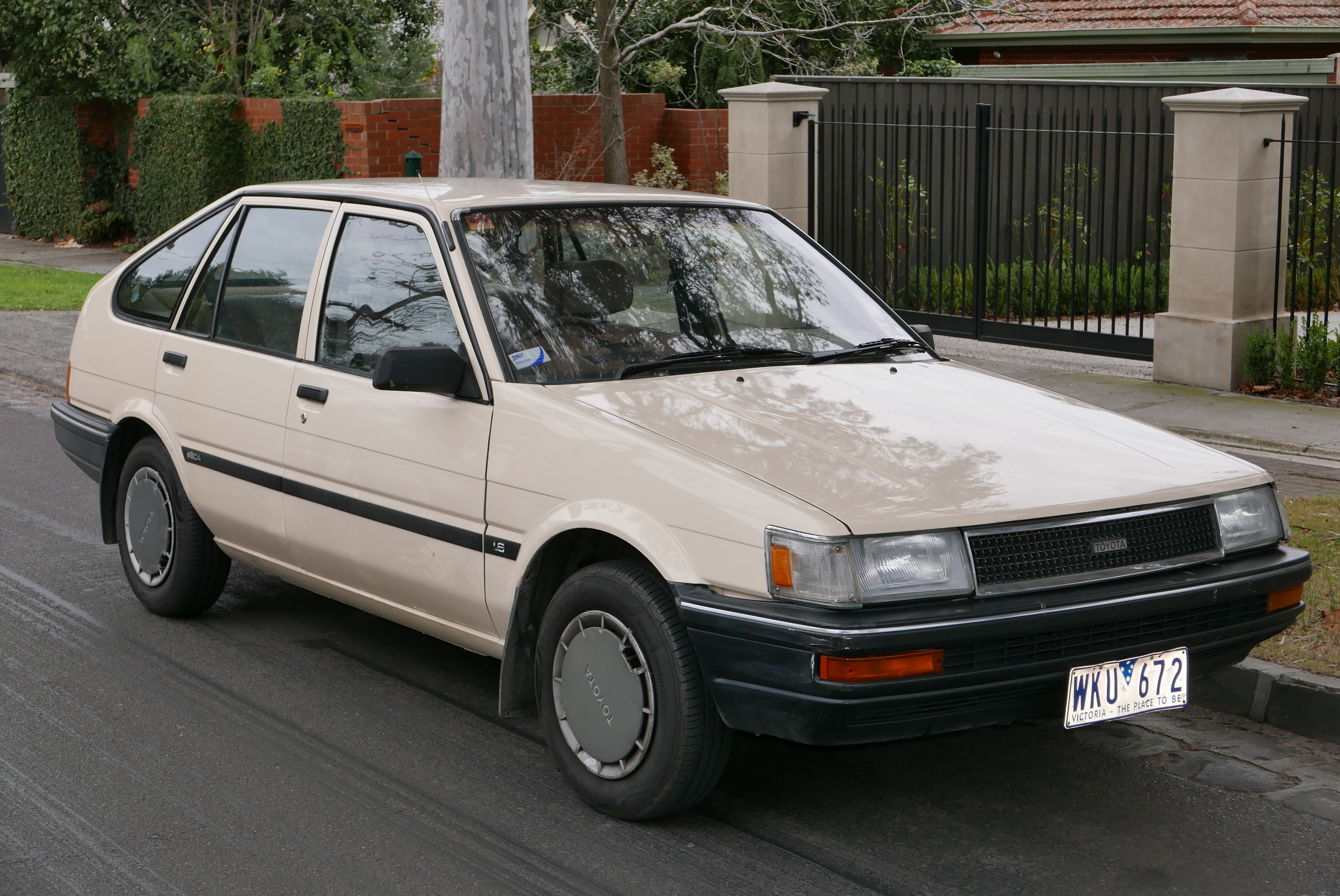
1987 Toyota Corolla (AE82) CS Seca liftback (Australia)

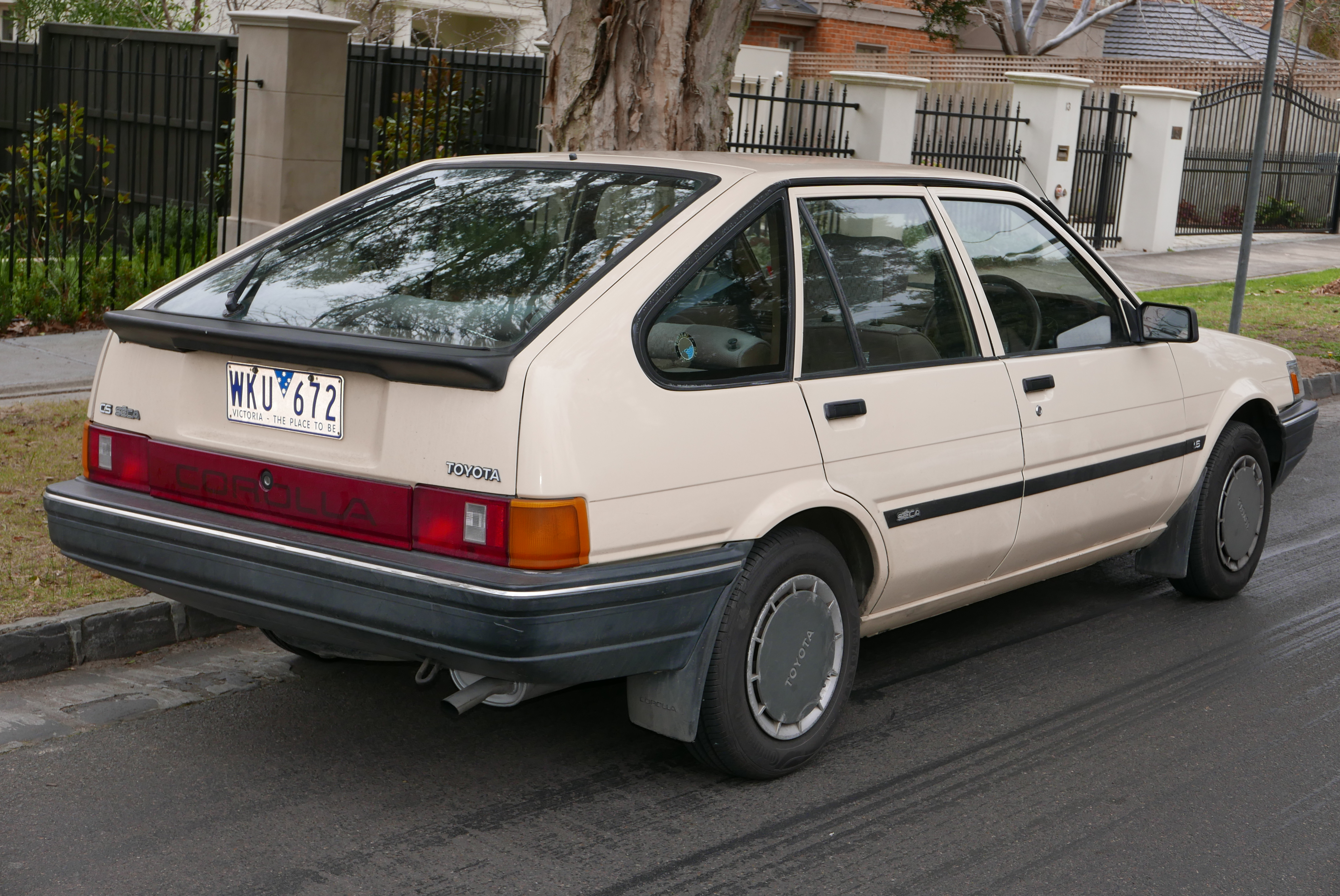
1987 Toyota Corolla (AE82) CS Seca liftback (Australia)

== Asia ==
Mainly 1.3 and 1.6 petrol engines were available in Asia:

- 2A-C 1.3 L I4, 8-valve SOHC, carb,
- 2E-L 1.3 L I4, 12-valve SOHC, carb, 72 PS (53 kW) SAE net (Indonesia)
- 4A-C 1.6 L I4, 8-valve SOHC, carb

After the 1985 facelift, the 1.3 was switched to the new 12-valve E-series unit. Model designations changed at the same time; in Indonesia it was switched from GL to SE Saloon. The newer model has slightly bigger headlamps and also received flush hubcaps.

Asian market chassis:

- EE80 – FWD 4-door sedan
- AE80 – FWD 4-door sedan
- AE82 – FWD 4-door sedan
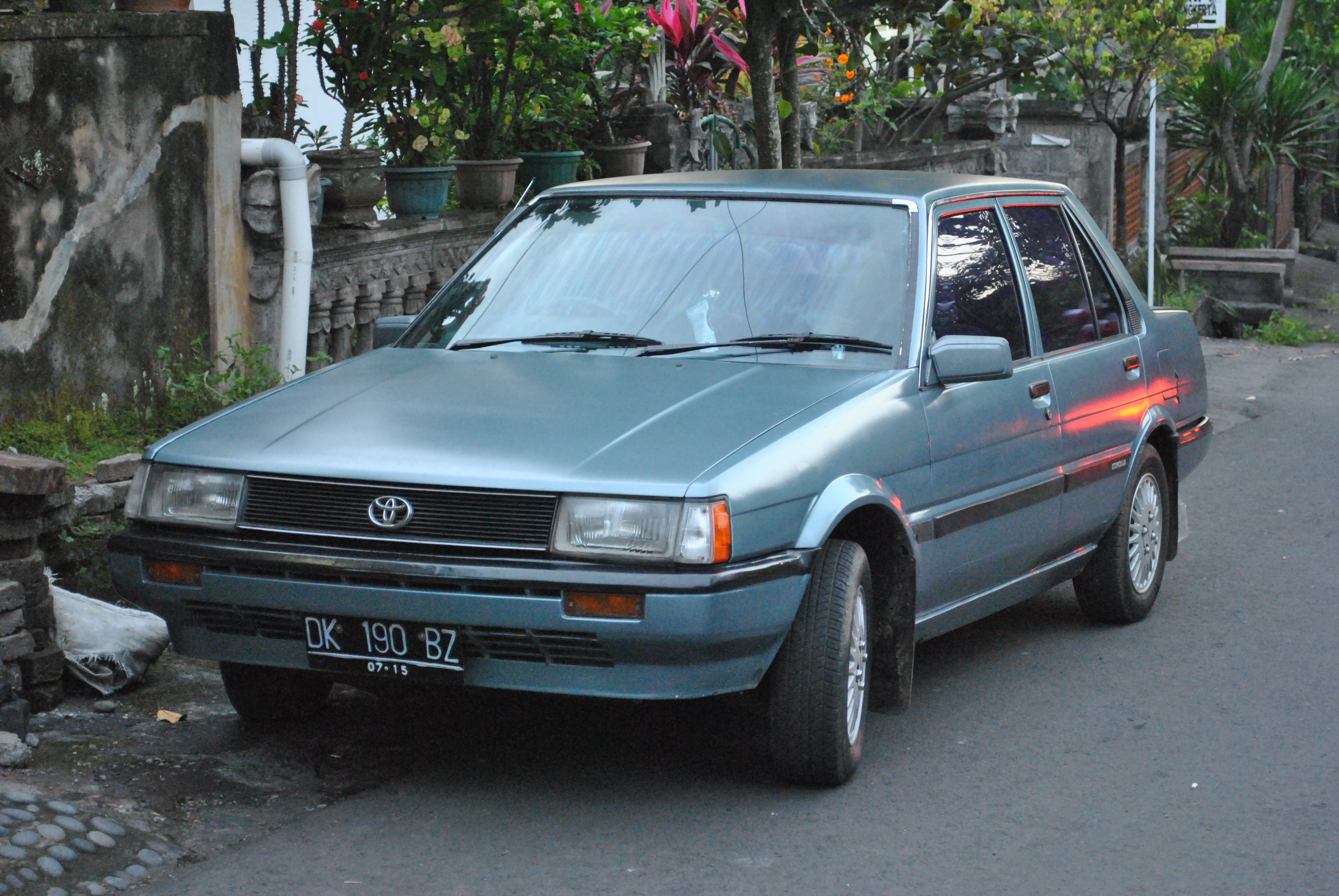
1983-1985 Toyota Corolla 1.3 GL (Indonesia)

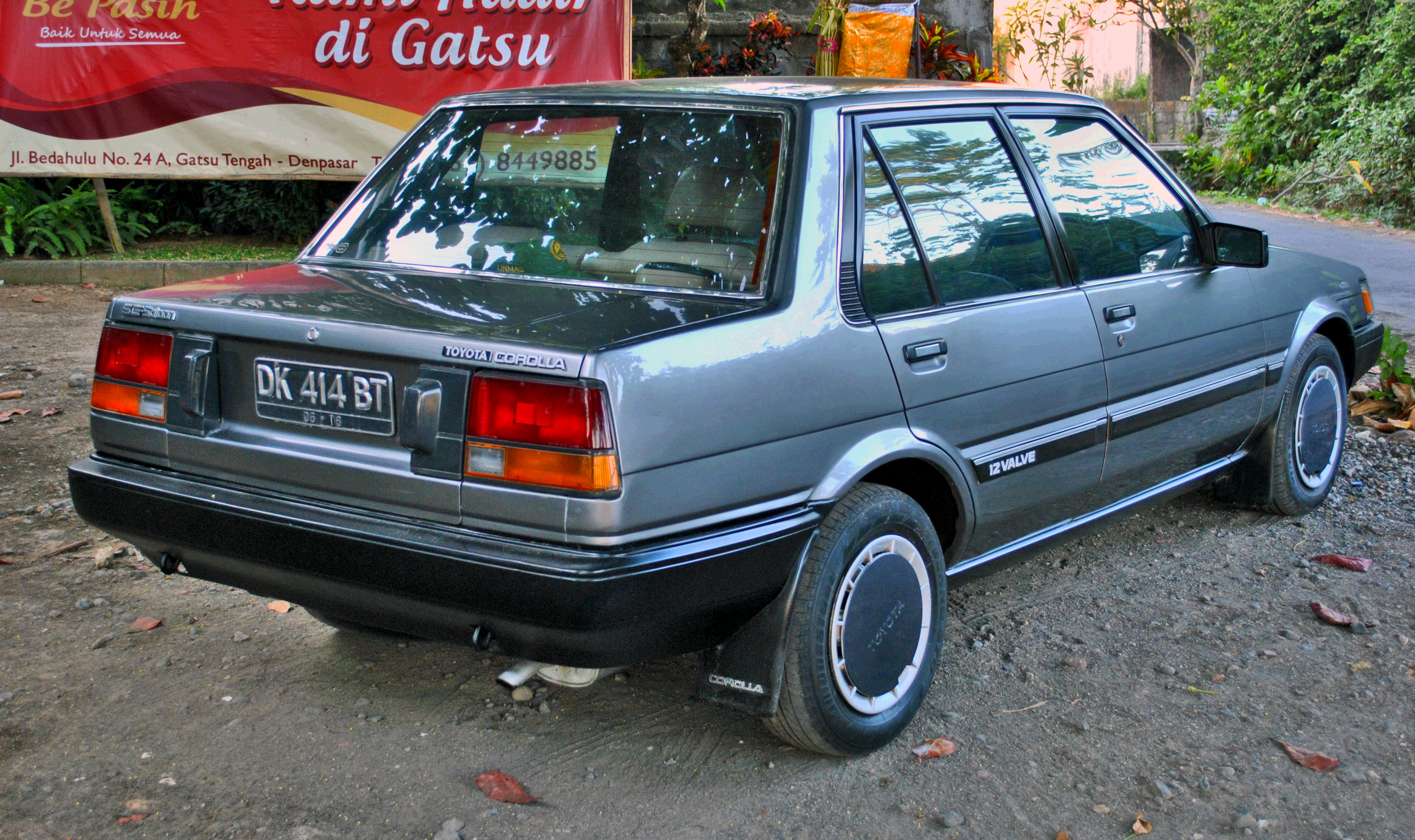
1985-1987 Toyota Corolla 1.3 SE Saloon (Indonesia)

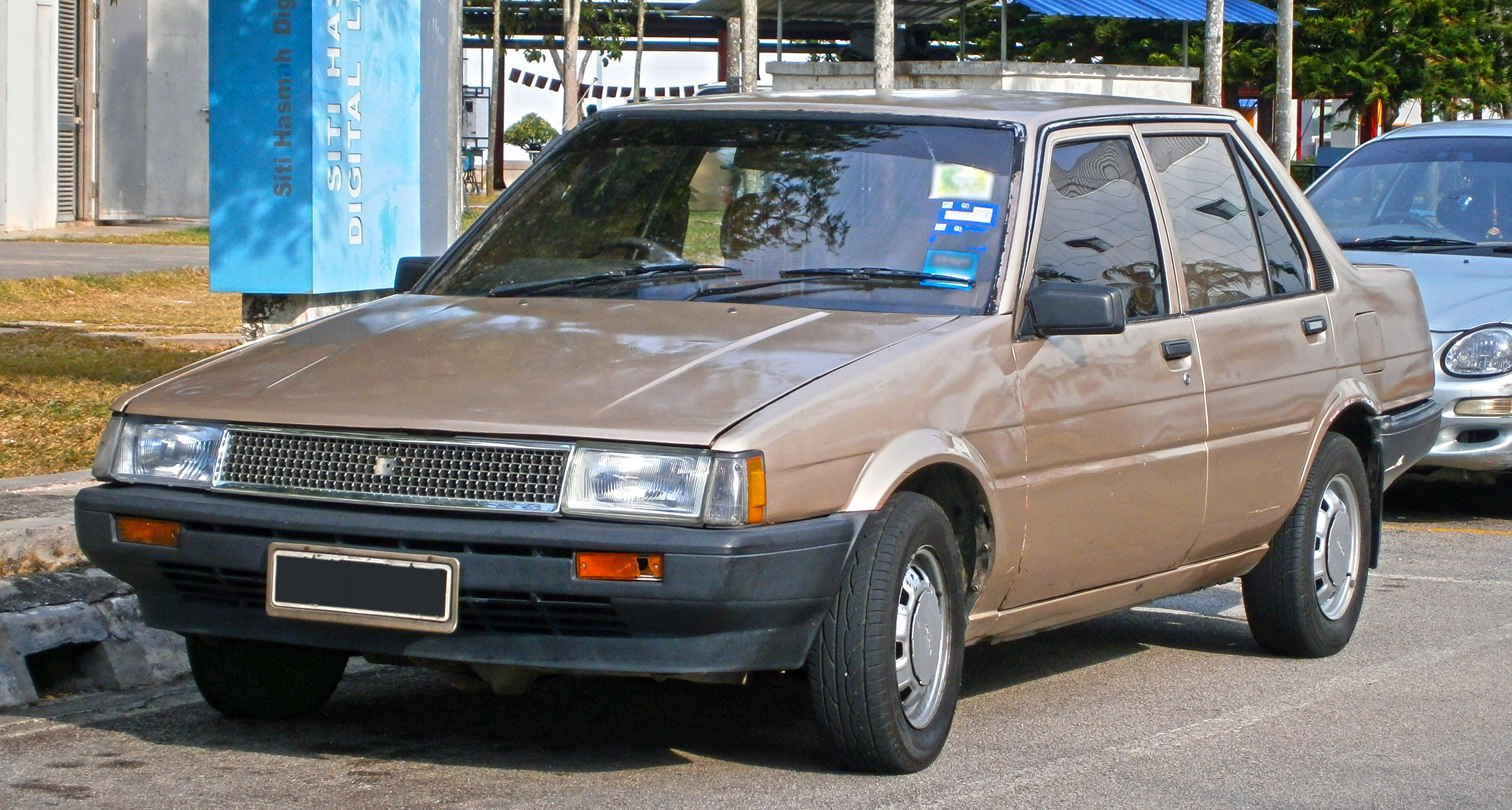
1983-1985 Toyota Corolla 1.6 GL (Malaysia)

== Motorsport ==
The rear-wheel-drive AE86 models campaigned in the Group A rally championship from 1985 until 1992. Victories included a class win in the 1985 Rally Portugal (its first), with Jorge Ortigão driving and J. Batista navigating. The car continued to be raced as late as the 1993 Acropolis Rally, with its best finish a third overall in the 1989 Rallye Côte d'Ivoire (with Adolphe Choteau/Jean-Pierre Claverie).

The AE86 became internationally prominent in the motorsport of drifting. Owners may heavily modify their AE86 models to where the only connection to the original model is the bodyshape.

John Smith won the 1986 Australian 2.0 Litre Touring Car Championship driving a Corolla GT AE86.
