= Phillip Scifleet =

Australian racing driver (born 1977)

- Nationality: Australian
- Born: 4 May 1977 (age 49) Sydney, New South Wales

V8 Supercar
- Years active: 2000-2006
- Teams: Lansvale Smash Repairs; RPM International Racing; Robert Smith Racing; Imrie Motorsport; Garry Rogers Motorsport
- Starts: 13
- Wins: 0
- Poles: 0
- Fastest laps: 0
- Best finish: 55th in 2002

Previous series
- 1993-94 1995 1996-97 1998 2000-06 2004-07: Karting; Australian Suzuki Swift Series; Formula Ford; British Formula 3 Championship; Supercars; Super2 Series

Championship titles
- 1994 1994 1998: Australian Formula A Kart Series; CIK Stars of Karting; British F3 - National Class

Awards
- 1994: James Courtney Trophy

Phillip David Scifleet (born 4 May 1977) is an Australian former racing driver.

== Career highlights ==
=== Early career ===
Starting in Karts in 1993, Scifleet's best season was in 1994 winning the Australian Formula A Title, CIK stars of Karting Championship and James Courtney Perpetual Trophy.

Scifleet moved into the cars for the Australian Suzuki Swift Series in 1995 finishing third.

=== Formula racing ===
Scifleet moved into Formula Ford in 1996, winning the New South Wales Championship. In 1997, he competed in the Australian Formula Ford Championship finishing tenth.

From there, Scifleet entered the 1998 British Formula Three Championship National Class, but ran out of funds halfway through the season. He did so well at the start of the season that he could not be caught in points and won the championship.

=== Supercars ===
Scifleet took two years off racing and entered V8 Supercar in 2000, doing mainly long-distance races until 2004, when he entered the Konica Series.

== Career results ==
=== Karting career summary ===
Season	Series	Position
1994	Australian Formula A Kart Series	**1st**
1994	CIK Stars of Karting - Formula A	**1st**
1994	James Courtney Perpetual Trophy	**1st**

=== Circuit racing career summary ===
Season	Series	Position	Car	Team
1995	Australian Suzuki GTi Cup	**3rd**	Suzuki Swift GTi	Ateco
1996	New South Wales Formula Ford Championship	**1st**	Spectrum 06 - Ford	Phillip Scifleet
1997	Australian Formula Ford Championship	10th	Spectrum 06 - Ford	Phillip Scifleet
1998	British Formula Three Championship National Class	**1st**	Dallara F395/6-Toyota	Rowan Racing
2000	Shell Championship Series	58th	Holden VS Commodore	Lansvale Racing Team
2001	Shell Championship Series	55th	Ford AU Falcon	RPM International Racing
2002	V8 Supercar Championship Series	59th	Ford AU Falcon	Halliday Motor Sport
2003	V8 Supercar Championship Series	60th	Holden VX Commodore	Robert Smith Racing
2004	Konica Minolta V8 Supercar Championship Series	24th	Ford AU Falcon	Rupprecht Motorsport
2005	HPDC Development Series	6th	Ford AU Falcon	Doric Racing
2005	V8 Supercar Championship Series	60th	Holden VY Commodore	Garry Rogers Motorsport
2006	V8 Supercar Championship Series	64th	Holden VZ Commodore	Garry Rogers Motorsport
2007	Fujitsu V8 Supercars Series	44th	Ford AU Falcon	HPM Racing

=== Complete British Formula 3 results ===
(key) (Races in bold indicate pole position, races in italics indicate fastest lap)

Year	Entrant	Chassis	Engine	Class	1	2	3	4	5	6	7	8	9	10	11	12	13	14	15	16	DC	Points
1998	Rowan Racing	Dallara F396	TOM'S-Toyota	National	**DON1**; **15**	**THR1**; **18**	**SIL1**; **12**	BRH1; 19	**BRH2**; **14**	**OUL**; **12**	**SIL2**; **16**	**CRO**; **16**	**SNE**; **14**	SIL3; 11	**PEM1**; **12**	**PEM2**; **22**	DON2	THR2	SPA	SIL4	1st	237

=== Supercars Championship results ===
(Races in bold indicate pole position) (Races in italics indicate fastest lap)

Supercars results
Year	Team	Car	1	2	3	4	5	6	7	8	9	10	11	12	13	14	15	16	17	18	19	20	21	22	23	24	25	26	27	28	29	30	31	32	33	34	Position	Points
2000	Lansvale Smash Repairs	Holden VS Commodore	PHI; R1	PHI; R2	BAR; R3	BAR; R4	BAR; R5	ADE; R6	ADE; R7	EAS; R8	EAS; R9	EAS; R10	HDV; R11	HDV; R12	HDV; R13	CAN; R14	CAN; R15	CAN; R16	QLD; R17	QLD; R18	QLD; R19	WIN; R20	WIN; R21	WIN; R22	ORA; R23	ORA; R24	ORA; R25	CAL; R26	CAL; R27	CAL; R28	QLD; R29; 16	SAN; R30	SAN; R31	SAN; R32	BAT; R33; Ret		58th	32
2001	RPM International Racing	Ford AU Falcon	PHI; R1	PHI; R2	ADE; R3	ADE; R4	EAS; R5	EAS; R6	HDV; R7	HDV; R8	HDV; R9	CAN; R10	CAN; R11	CAN; R12	BAR; R13	BAR; R14	BAR; R15	CAL; R16	CAL; R17	CAL; R18	ORA; R19	ORA; R20	QLD; R21; Ret	WIN; R22	WIN; R23	BAT; R24; 19	PUK; R25	PUK; R26	PUK; R27	SAN; R28	SAN; R29	SAN; R30					55th	200
2002	Halliday Motorsport	Ford AU Falcon	ADE; R1	ADE; R2	PHI; R3	PHI; R4	EAS; R5	EAS; R6	EAS; R7	HDV; R8	HDV; R9	HDV; R10	CAN; R11	CAN; R12	CAN; R13	BAR; R14	BAR; R15	BAR; R16	ORA; R17	ORA; R18	WIN; R19	WIN; R20	QLD; R21; 16	BAT; R22; Ret	SUR; R23	SUR; R24	PUK; R25	PUK; R26	PUK; R27	SAN; R28	SAN; R29						59th	34
2003	Robert Smith Racing	Holden VX Commodore	ADE; R1	ADE; R1	PHI; R3	EAS; R4	WIN; R5	BAR; R6	BAR; R7	BAR; R8	HDV; R9	HDV; R10	HDV; R11	QLD; R12	ORA; R13	SAN; R14; 21	BAT; R15; 21	SUR; R16	SUR; R17	PUK; R18	PUK; R19	PUK; R20	EAS; R21	EAS; R22													60th	112
2004	Imrie Motorsport	Holden VX Commodore	ADE; R1; Ret	ADE; R2; DNS	EAS; R3; DNQ	PUK; R4	PUK; R5	PUK; R6	HDV; R7	HDV; R8	HDV; R9	BAR; R10	BAR; R11	BAR; R12	QLD; R13	WIN; R14	ORA; R15	ORA; R16																			NC	0
2004	Robert Smith Racing	Holden VY Commodore																	SAN; R17; Ret	BAT; R18	SUR; R19	SUR; R20	SYM; R21	SYM; R22	SYM; R23	EAS; R24	EAS; R25	EAS; R26									NC	0
2005	Garry Rogers Motorsport	Holden VZ Commodore	ADE; R1	ADE; R2	PUK; R3	PUK; R4	PUK; R5	BAR; R6	BAR; R7	BAR; R8	EAS; R9	EAS; R10	SHA; R11	SHA; R12	SHA; R13	HDV; R14	HDV; R15	HDV; R16	QLD; R17	ORA; R18	ORA; R19	SAN; R20; 20	BAT; R21; Ret	SUR; R22	SUR; R23	SUR; R24	SYM; R25	SYM; R26	SYM; R27	PHI; R28	PHI; R29	PHI; R30					61st	116
2006	Garry Rogers Motorsport	Holden VZ Commodore	ADE; R1	ADE; R2	PUK; R3	PUK; R4	PUK; R5	BAR; R6	BAR; R7	BAR; R8	WIN; R9	WIN; R10	WIN; R11	HDV; R12	HDV; R13	HDV; R14	QLD; R15	QLD; R16	QLD; R17	ORA; R18	ORA; R19	ORA; R20	SAN; R21; 20	BAT; R22	SUR; R23	SUR; R24	SUR; R25	SYM; R26	SYM; R27	SYM; R28	BHR; R29	BHR; R30	BHR; R31	PHI; R32	PHI; R33	PHI; R34	64th	0

=== Complete Development Series results ===
(key) (Races in bold indicate pole position) (Races in italics indicate fastest lap)

Year	Team	Car	1	2	3	4	5	6	7	8	9	10	11	12	13	14	15	16	17	18	Position	Points
2004	Rupprecht Motorsport	Ford AU Falcon	WAK; 8	WAK; Ret	WAK; 5	ADE; 21	ADE; 8	WIN; 11	WIN; Ret	WIN; DNS	EAS; 16	EAS; 10	EAS; 16	QLD	QLD	QLD	MAL	MAL	MAL		24th	375
2005	Paul Cruickshank Racing	Ford AU Falcon	ADE; 4	ADE; 4	WAK; 7	WAK; 12	WAK; 6	EAS; 5	EAS; 6	EAS; 5	QLD; 9	QLD; 16	QLD; 6	MAL; 6	MAL; 4	MAL; 8	BAT; 11	BAT; C	PHI; Ret	PHI; 9	6th	924
2007	HPM Racing	Ford BA Falcon	ADE	ADE	WAK	WAK	WAK	WIN	WIN	WIN	QLD	QLD	QLD	ORA	ORA	ORA	BAT	BAT	PHI; Ret	PHI; 17	NC	0

=== Bathurst 1000 results ===
Year	No.	Team	Car	Co-driver	Position	Laps
2000	23	Lansvale Racing Team	Holden VS Commodore	(Australia) Geoff Full	DNF	89
2001	45	RPM International Racing	Ford AU Falcon	(Australia) Christian D’Agostin	19th	147
2002	161	Halliday Motor Sport	Ford AU Falcon	(Australia) Greg Crick	DNF	94
2003	13	Robert Smith Racing	Holden VX Commodore	(Australia) Steve Owen	21st	141
2005	33	Garry Rogers Motorsport	Holden VZ Commodore	(Australia) Lee Holdsworth	DNF	136

Sporting positions
Preceded by Martin O'Connell	British Formula 3 International Series; National Class Champion; 1998	Succeeded by Martin O'Connell
Awards and achievements
Preceded by Richard McLeod	James Courtney Perpetual Trophy; 1994	Succeeded by Darrell Smith
