= 1998 British Formula Three Championship =

1998 British Formula 3 International Series

Seasons
- ← 1997 1999 →

The 1998 British Formula Three season was the 48th British Formula Three Championship season. It commenced on 22 March, and ended on 4 October after sixteen races. Mario Haberfeld was the champion, while Phillip Scifleet won the Class B championship. The season was one of two halves as Enrique Bernoldi dominated the first half of the season and compatriot Haberfeld the second; ultimately the latter would prevail thanks in part to his stronger consistency.

The scoring system was 20-15-12-10-8-6-4-3-2-1 points awarded to the first ten finishers, with 1 (one) extra point added to the driver who set the fastest lap of the race. All results counted towards the driver's final tally.

== Drivers and teams ==
The following teams and drivers were competitors in the 1998 season. Class B is for older Formula Three cars.

Team	No	Driver	Chassis	Engine	Rounds
Class A
(United Kingdom) Stewart Racing	1	(Brazil) Luciano Burti	Dallara F398	Mugen-Honda	All
(United Kingdom) Stewart Racing	2	(Brazil) Mario Haberfeld	Dallara F398	Mugen-Honda	All
(United Kingdom) Fortec Motorsport	3	(Australia) Andrej Pavicevic	Dallara F398	Mugen-Honda	All
(United Kingdom) Fortec Motorsport	4	(Denmark) Kristian Kolby	Dallara F398	Mugen-Honda	All
(United Kingdom) Promatecme UK	5	(Brazil) Enrique Bernoldi	Dallara F398	Renault Sodemo	All
(United Kingdom) Promatecme UK	6	(United Kingdom) Marc Hynes	Dallara F398	Renault Sodemo	All
(United Kingdom) Alan Docking Racing	7	(Brazil) Ricardo Mauricio	Dallara F398	Mugen-Honda	All
(United Kingdom) Alan Docking Racing	8	(Japan) Yudai Igarashi	Dallara F398	Mugen-Honda	All
(United Kingdom) Alan Docking Racing	11	(Finland) Miku Santavirta	Dallara F398	Mugen-Honda	6-7
(United Kingdom) Alan Docking Racing	11	(Malaysia) Alex Yoong	Dallara F398	Mugen-Honda	14-16
(United Kingdom) SpeedSport	9	(United Kingdom) Michael Bentwood	Dallara F398	Mugen-Honda	1-7, 10-16
(United Kingdom) SpeedSport	9	(United Kingdom) Darren Manning	Dallara F398	Mugen-Honda	8-9
(United Kingdom) SpeedSport	10	(United Kingdom) Darren Manning	Dallara F398	Mugen-Honda	10, 15
(United Kingdom) SpeedSport	10	(United Kingdom) Mark Boost	Dallara F398	Mugen-Honda	11-14, 16
(United Kingdom) SpeedSport	10	(United Kingdom) John Ingram	Dallara F398	Mugen-Honda	6-7, 9
(United Kingdom) SpeedSport	42	(United Kingdom) Adam Wilcox	Dallara F398	Mugen-Honda	1-3
(United Kingdom) Carlin Motorsport	12	(India) Narain Karthikeyan	Dallara F398	Mugen-Honda	11-16
(United Kingdom) Carlin Motorsport	15	(Macau) Lei Kit Meng	Dallara F398	Mugen-Honda	11-12
(Republic of Ireland) Martin Donnelly Racing	14	(United Kingdom) Jamie Spence	Dallara F398	Renault Sodemo	1-8
(Republic of Ireland) Martin Donnelly Racing	14	(United Kingdom) Jamie Spence	Dallara F398	Mugen-Honda	9-15
(United Kingdom) TOM'S	16	(United Kingdom) Martin O'Connell	Dallara F398	TOM'S-Toyota	1-10
(United Kingdom) TOM'S	42	(United Kingdom) Adam Wilcox	TOM'S 037F	TOM'S-Toyota	4-10
(United Kingdom) Rowan Racing	16	(United Kingdom) Martin O'Connell	Dallara F398	TOM'S-Toyota	11-16
(United Kingdom) Rowan Racing	17	(Republic of Ireland) Warren Carway	Dallara F398	TOM'S-Toyota	11-15
(United Kingdom) DC Cook	18	(United Kingdom) David Cook	Dallara F398	Opel Spiess	1-8
(United Kingdom) DC Cook	19	(United Kingdom) Paula Cook	Dallara F398	Opel Spiess	1-10
(United Kingdom) SS Sport	20	(United Kingdom) Tim Spouge	Dallara F398	Mugen-Honda	All
(United Kingdom) Portman Racing	21	(United Kingdom) Warren Hughes	Dallara F398	Renault Sodemo	All
(United Kingdom) Portman Racing	22	(Malaysia) Alex Yoong	Dallara F398	Renault Sodemo	1-10
(United Kingdom) Portman Racing	22	(United Kingdom) Paula Cook	Dallara F398	Renault Sodemo	11-13
(United Kingdom) Portman Racing	22	(Finland) Topi Serjala	Dallara F398	Renault Sodemo	16
(United Kingdom) Intersport	27	(United Kingdom) Ben Collins	Dallara F398	Opel Spiess	All
(United Kingdom) Intersport	32	(India) Narain Karthikeyan	Dallara F398	Opel Spiess	1–3, 6
(United Kingdom) Intersport	32	(United Kingdom) Michael Bentwood	Dallara F398	Opel Spiess	8–9
(United Kingdom) Intersport	42	(United Kingdom) Adam Wilcox	Dallara F398	Opel Spiess	11-16
Class B
(United Kingdom) Rowan Racing	51	(Republic of Ireland) Warren Carway	Dallara F396	TOM'S-Toyota	1-10
(United Kingdom) Rowan Racing	52	(Australia) Phillip Scifleet	Dallara F396	TOM'S-Toyota	1-12
(United Kingdom) Tarry Falcon Racing	53	(United Kingdom) John Ingram	Dallara F396	Mugen-Honda	1
(United Kingdom) Tarry Falcon Racing	53	(United Kingdom) Stephen White	Dallara F396	Mugen-Honda	4-5
(United Kingdom) Tarry Falcon Racing	53	(New Zealand) Steve Hayr	Dallara F396	Mugen-Honda	9–13, 16
(United Kingdom) SpeedSport	77	(United Kingdom) John Ingram	Dallara F396	Mugen-Honda	10-12, 16
(United Kingdom) SpeedSport	77	(United Kingdom) Mike Kirkham	Dallara F396	Mugen-Honda	13–16

- Round 15 was contested by an assortment of entrants from other European F3 championships; they were eligible to score points.

== Results ==
Round	Circuit	Date	Pole Position	Fastest Lap	Winning Driver	Winning Team	National Class Winner
1	(United Kingdom) Donington Park	22 March	(Brazil) Enrique Bernoldi	(Brazil) Enrique Bernoldi	(Brazil) Enrique Bernoldi	(France) Promatecme	(Australia) Phillip Scifleet
2	(United Kingdom) Thruxton	29 March	(United Kingdom) Martin O'Connell	(Brazil) Enrique Bernoldi	(Brazil) Enrique Bernoldi	(France) Promatecme	(Australia) Phillip Scifleet
3	(United Kingdom) Silverstone	5 April	(Brazil) Mario Haberfeld	(Brazil) Mario Haberfeld	(Brazil) Mario Haberfeld	(United Kingdom) Stewart Racing	(Australia) Phillip Scifleet
4	(United Kingdom) Brands Hatch	26 April	(Brazil) Mario Haberfeld	(United Kingdom) Marc Hynes	(Brazil) Enrique Bernoldi	(France) Promatecme	(Australia) Phillip Scifleet
5	(United Kingdom) Brands Hatch	26 April	(Brazil) Mario Haberfeld	(Brazil) Luciano Burti	(Brazil) Luciano Burti	(United Kingdom) Stewart Racing	(Republic of Ireland) Warren Carway
6	(United Kingdom) Oulton Park	4 May	(Brazil) Enrique Bernoldi	(Brazil) Enrique Bernoldi	(Brazil) Enrique Bernoldi	(France) Promatecme	(Australia) Phillip Scifleet
7	(United Kingdom) Silverstone	17 May	(Brazil) Enrique Bernoldi	(Brazil) Enrique Bernoldi	(Brazil) Enrique Bernoldi	(France) Promatecme	(Australia) Phillip Scifleet
8	(United Kingdom) Croft	24 May	(Brazil) Mario Haberfeld	(Brazil) Mario Haberfeld	(Brazil) Mario Haberfeld	(United Kingdom) Stewart Racing	(Australia) Phillip Scifleet
9	(United Kingdom) Snetterton	14 June	(Brazil) Luciano Burti	(United Kingdom) Darren Manning	(United Kingdom) Darren Manning	(United Kingdom) SpeedSport	(Australia) Phillip Scifleet
10	(United Kingdom) Silverstone	11 July	(United Kingdom) Darren Manning	(United Kingdom) Martin O'Connell	(United Kingdom) Darren Manning	(United Kingdom) SpeedSport	(Australia) Phillip Scifleet
11	(United Kingdom) Pembrey	16 August	(Brazil) Mario Haberfeld	(Brazil) Mario Haberfeld	(Brazil) Mario Haberfeld	(United Kingdom) Stewart Racing	(Australia) Phillip Scifleet
12	(United Kingdom) Pembrey	16 August	(Brazil) Luciano Burti	(Brazil) Mario Haberfeld	(Brazil) Luciano Burti	(United Kingdom) Stewart Racing	(United Kingdom) John Ingram
13	(United Kingdom) Donington Park	30 August	(Brazil) Mario Haberfeld	(Denmark) Kristian Kolby	(Brazil) Enrique Bernoldi	(France) Promatecme	(United Kingdom) Mike Kirkham
14	(United Kingdom) Thruxton	13 September	(United Kingdom) Jamie Spence	(Denmark) Kristian Kolby	(Brazil) Mario Haberfeld	(United Kingdom) Stewart Racing	No Entrants
15	(Belgium) Spa-Francorchamps	27 September	(Brazil) Luciano Burti	(United Kingdom) Darren Manning	(Brazil) Mario Haberfeld	(United Kingdom) Stewart Racing	No Entrants
16	(United Kingdom) Silverstone	4 October	(Brazil) Enrique Bernoldi	(United Kingdom) Warren Hughes	(Brazil) Mario Haberfeld	(United Kingdom) Stewart Racing	(United Kingdom) John Ingram

== Standings ==
Pos	Driver	DON (United Kingdom)	THR (United Kingdom)	SIL (United Kingdom)	BRH (United Kingdom)	BRH (United Kingdom)	OUL (United Kingdom)	SIL (United Kingdom)	CRO (United Kingdom)	SNE (United Kingdom)	SIL (United Kingdom)	PEM (United Kingdom)	PEM (United Kingdom)	DON (United Kingdom)	THR (United Kingdom)	SPA (Belgium)	SIL (United Kingdom)	Pts
Class A
1	(Brazil) Mario Haberfeld	4	4	1	3	Ret	Ret	3	1	2	5	1	2	3	1	1	1	218
2	(Brazil) Enrique Bernoldi	1	1	2	1	Ret	1	1	Ret	Ret	Ret	4	7	1	Ret	4	Ret	163
3	(Brazil) Luciano Burti	3	5	Ret	10	1	3	2	3	Ret	Ret	5	1	4	3	Ret	6	137
4	(United Kingdom) Warren Hughes	Ret	3	4	5	2	6	7	4	3	2	2	13	5	7	9	4	132
5	(United Kingdom) Martin O'Connell	2	2	Ret	2	3	2	5	2	Ret	Ret	11	8	11	2	22	Ret	114
6	(Denmark) Kristian Kolby	Ret	7	Ret	6	Ret	5	4	Ret	10	4	9	21	6	4	5	2	82
7	(Brazil) Ricardo Mauricio	7	Ret	5	11	5	7	6	9	4	3	10	5	2	Ret	Ret	Ret	78
8	(United Kingdom) Darren Manning								5	1	1					2		65
9	(United Kingdom) Marc Hynes	5	11	3	7	Ret	Ret	8	7	Ret	Ret	8	3	7	6	Ret	Ret	57
10	(United Kingdom) Jamie Spence	6	6	Ret	9	4	4	9	Ret	Ret	Ret	3	6	Ret	Ret	Ret		54
11	(United Kingdom) Ben Collins	Ret	10	Ret	4	6	Ret	19	6	6	Ret	7	9	10	8	8	8	45
12	(India) Narain Karthikeyan	9	9	Ret			Ret					6	4	Ret	Ret	3	3	44
13	(Malaysia) Alex Yoong	12	8	6	8	8	9	11	Ret	7	6				9	6	Ret	35
14	(Australia) Andrej Pavicevic	13	17	10	16	10	8	12	15	12	9	18	10	8	5	Ret	Ret	19
15	(United Kingdom) Adam Wilcox	Ret	15	9	17	12	11	14	13	5	7	Ret	14	15	10	16	10	16
16	(Japan) Yudai Igarashi	10	14	7	13	16	14	15	11	9	10	Ret	11	Ret	Ret	17	7	12
17	(United Kingdom) Michael Bentwood	DSQ	12	Ret	18	11	Ret	18	14	13	12	Ret	12	9	Ret	10	5	11
18	(United Kingdom) David Cook	8	Ret	14	14	7	Ret	13	8									10
19	(United Kingdom) Tim Spouge	14	16	11	12	15	Ret	Ret	12	8	8	Ret	15	12	Ret	19	9	8
20	(United Kingdom) Paula Cook	11	13	8	15	9	10	Ret	10	11	Ret	14	16	13				7
21	(Switzerland) Marcel Fässler															7		4
22	(Finland) Miku Santavirta						13	10										1
23	(Sweden) Peter Sundberg															11		0
24	(Finland) Topi Serjala																11	0
25	(France) Benoît Tréluyer															12		0
26	(United Kingdom) Mark Boost											15	Ret	Ret	Ret		12	0
27	(Republic of Ireland) Warren Carway											13	17	14	Ret	21	Ret	0
28	(Portugal) Tiago Monteiro															13		0
29	(France) Sebastien Dumez															14		0
30	(United Kingdom) John Ingram						15	Ret		16								0
31	(Switzerland) Gabriele Gardel															15		0
32	(Macau) Lei Kit Meng											Ret	18					0
33	(France) Sébastien Bourdais															18		0
34	(Netherlands) Christijan Albers															20		0
	(Belgium) David Saelens															Ret		0
	(France) Franck Montagny															Ret		0
	(Italy) Paolo Montin															Ret		0
	(Germany) Norman Simon															Ret		0
Class B
1	(Australia) Phillip Scifleet	15	18	12	19	14	12	16	16	14	11	12	22					237
2	(Republic of Ireland) Warren Carway	Ret	19	13	Ret	13	Ret	17	17	15	Ret							97
3	(New Zealand) Steve Hayr									17	13	17	20	17			Ret	69
4	(United Kingdom) John Ingram	Ret									Ret	16	19				13	56
5	(United Kingdom) Mike Kirkham													16				21
6	(United Kingdom) Stephen White				Ret	17												12
Pos	Driver	DON (United Kingdom)	THR (United Kingdom)	SIL (United Kingdom)	BRH (United Kingdom)	BRH (United Kingdom)	OUL (United Kingdom)	SIL (United Kingdom)	CRO (United Kingdom)	SNE (United Kingdom)	SIL (United Kingdom)	PEM (United Kingdom)	PEM (United Kingdom)	DON (United Kingdom)	THR (United Kingdom)	SPA (Belgium)	SIL (United Kingdom)	Pts

Colour	Result
Gold	Winner
Silver	Second place
Bronze	Third place
Green	Points classification
Blue	Non-points classification
Blue	Non-classified finish (NC)
Purple	Retired, not classified (Ret)
Red	Did not qualify (DNQ)
Red	Did not pre-qualify (DNPQ)
Black	Disqualified (DSQ)
White	Did not start (DNS)
White	Withdrew (WD)
White	Race cancelled (C)
Blank	Did not practice (DNP)
Blank	Did not arrive (DNA)
Blank	Excluded (EX)

- Points System: 20-15-12-10-8-6-4-3-2-1 for first 10 finishers, with 1 point awarded for fastest lap.
