= 2011 Australian Suzuki Swift Series =

Australian motor racing series

Seasons
- ← 1995 2012 →

The 2011 Australian Swift Series was the second running of the series. It was based around seven rounds in four different states. The season featured drivers like former 1987 Bathurst 1000 winner Peter McLeod and his son, former V8 Supercar competitor Ryan McLeod. Former V8 Utes driver Rob Jarvis, joined by his speedway driving son Allan, were regulars. Production Car racers Richard Mork, BJ Cook and New Zealanders Rex McCutcheon and Mark Gibson made appearances throughout the season. The final round was taken out by two time Australian Formula Vee National winner Ryan Simpson.

== Calendar ==
The 2011 Australian Swift Series was contested over seven rounds, starting at Mallala in May and finishing at Eastern Creek in December.

Rd.	Supporting	Circuit / State	Date	Winner	Results
1	Shannons Nationals Motor Racing Championships	Mallala Motor Sport Park, South Australia	14–15 May	Rex McCutcheon	Results
2	Shannons Nationals Motor Racing Championships	Winton Raceway, Victoria	25–26 June	Jessie Dixon	Results
3	Shannons Nationals Motor Racing Championships	Eastern Creek Raceway, New South Wales	15–17 July	Rex McCutcheon	Results
4	Shannons Nationals Motor Racing Championships	Morgan Park Raceway, Queensland	13–14 Aug.	Allan Jarvis	Results
5	Shannons Nationals Motor Racing Championships	Sandown Raceway, Victoria	10–11 Sept.	Mark Gibson	Results
6	Queensland Raceways Drivers Championship	Lakeside Raceway, Queensland	12–13 Nov.	Allan Jarvis	Results
7	Eastern Creek 6 Hour	Eastern Creek Raceway, New South Wales	10–11 Dec.	Ryan Simpson	Results

== Driver standings ==
Pos	Driver	Rd 1	Rd 2	Rd 3	Rd 4	Rd 5	Rd 6	Rd 7	Pts
1	Allan Jarvis	64	95	97	113	93	113	95	670
2	Brooke Leech	85	82	53	89	86	91	85	569
3	Morgan Haber	97	84	101	66	105	39		492
4	Rob Jarvis	52	DNS	83	85	85	89	94	488
5	Rex McCutcheon	113	109	105		DNS			327
6	Jesse Dixon	99	109	70					304
7	Peter McLeod			84	86		DNS		170
8	Harley Phelan	82	56						138
9	Ryan Simpson							117	117
=	Mark Gibson					117			117
11	Steve Robinson				101				101
12	Adam Brand							93	93
13	Ryan McLeod		85			WD			85
14	Brendon Cook			WD		DNS		83	83
15	Christian Clarke						80		80
16	Reece Murphy						79		79
17	Justin Johns						78	0	78
18	Dan Jarvis						73		73
19	Richard Mork						63		63
=	Joshua Coote						63		63
Pos	Driver	Rd 1	Rd 2	Rd 3	Rd 4	Rd 5	Rd 6	Rd 7	Pts

Colour	Result
Gold	Winner
Silver	Second place
Bronze	Third place
Green	Points classification
Blue	Non-points classification
Blue	Non-classified finish (NC)
Purple	Retired, not classified (Ret)
Red	Did not qualify (DNQ)
Red	Did not pre-qualify (DNPQ)
Black	Disqualified (DSQ)
White	Did not start (DNS)
White	Withdrew (WD)
White	Race cancelled (C)
Blank	Did not practice (DNP)
Blank	Did not arrive (DNA)
Blank	Excluded (EX)
