= 2004 Adelaide 500 =

This is an article about The 2004 Clipasal 500

(South Australia) 2004 Clipsal 500
Event Information
- Round 1 of 13 in the 2004 V8 Supercar Championship Series
- Date: 19–21 March 2004
- Location: Adelaide, South Australia
- Venue: Adelaide Street Circuit
- Weather: Fine

Results
Race 1
Distance	78 laps	250 km
Pole position	Greg Murphy; K-mart Racing Team	1:22.4672
Winner	Marcos Ambrose; Stone Brothers Racing	1:57:38.7153
Race 2
Distance	78 laps	250 km
Winner	Marcos Ambrose; Stone Brothers Racing	2:00:31.4199
Round Results
First	Marcos Ambrose; Stone Brothers Racing	192 pts
Second	Steven Richards; Perkins Engineering	186 pts
Third	Paul Weel; Paul Weel Racing	171 pts

The 2004 Clipsal 500, known for naming rights reasons as the 2004 Clipsal 500, was the sixth running of the Adelaide 500 race. Racing was held from Friday 18 March until Sunday 21 March 2004. The race was held for V8 Supercars and was the opening round of the 2004 V8 Supercar Championship Series.

== Format ==
The format, unique to V8 Supercars and loosely similar to the Pukekohe 500 format, split the total distance of 500 kilometres into two separate 250 kilometre races each held on a different day. Points were assigned separately to the races, with more points allocated for Race 2 over Race 1, and they combined to award a round result.

== Official results ==
=== Qualifying ===
Pos.	No.	Driver	Team	Car	Time
1	1	(Australia) Marcos Ambrose	Stone Brothers Racing	Ford Falcon (BA)	1:21.9363
2	888	(Brazil) Max Wilson	Triple Eight Race Engineering	Ford Falcon (BA)	1:22.1849
3	44	(New Zealand) Simon Wills	Team Dynamik	Holden Commodore (VY)	1:22.2522
4	88	(New Zealand) Paul Radisich	Triple Eight Race Engineering	Ford Falcon (BA)	1:22.3407
5	12	(Australia) John Bowe	Brad Jones Racing	Ford Falcon (BA)	1:22.3951
6	31	(Australia) Steven Ellery	Steven Ellery Racing	Ford Falcon (BA)	1:22.4183
7	9	(Australia) Russell Ingall	Stone Brothers Racing	Ford Falcon (BA)	1:22.4188
8	51	(New Zealand) Greg Murphy	John Kelly Racing	Holden Commodore (VY)	1:22.4403
9	50	(Australia) Jason Bright	Paul Weel Racing	Holden Commodore (VY)	1:22.5114
10	34	(Australia) Garth Tander	Garry Rogers Motorsport	Holden Commodore (VY)	1:22.5756
11	15	(Australia) Rick Kelly	John Kelly Racing	Holden Commodore (VY)	1:22.5822
12	11	(New Zealand) Steven Richards	Perkins Engineering	Holden Commodore (VY)	1:22.6738
13	2	(Australia) Mark Skaife	Holden Racing Team	Holden Commodore (VY)	1:22.6996
14	22	(Australia) Todd Kelly	Holden Racing Team	Holden Commodore (VY)	1:22.7015
15	17	(Australia) Steven Johnson	Dick Johnson Racing	Ford Falcon (BA)	1:22.7455
16	10	(Australia) Jason Bargwanna	Larkham Motorsport	Ford Falcon (BA)	1:22.8081
17	6	(Australia) Craig Lowndes	Ford Performance Racing	Ford Falcon (BA)	1:22.8889
18	29	(Australia) Paul Morris	Paul Morris Motorsport	Holden Commodore (VY)	1:23.0031
19	21	(Australia) Brad Jones	Brad Jones Racing	Ford Falcon (BA)	1:23.1066
20	5	(Australia) Glenn Seton	Ford Performance Racing	Ford Falcon (BA)	1:23.1401
21	8	(Australia) Paul Dumbrell	Perkins Engineering	Holden Commodore (VX)	1:23.1770
22	33	(Australia) Cameron McConville	Garry Rogers Motorsport	Holden Commodore (VY)	1:23.1886
23	3	(New Zealand) Jason Richards	Tasman Motorsport	Holden Commodore (VX)	1:23.2441
24	18	(Australia) Warren Luff	Dick Johnson Racing	Ford Falcon (BA)	1:23.3066
25	021	(New Zealand) Craig Baird	Team Kiwi Racing	Holden Commodore (VY)	1:23.6259
26	23	(Australia) David Besnard	WPS Racing	Ford Falcon (BA)	1:23.7854
27	75	(Australia) Anthony Tratt	Paul Little Racing	Holden Commodore (VY)	1:24.3065
28	45	(Australia) Dale Brede	Team Dynamik	Holden Commodore (VY)	1:24.6625
29	24	(Australia) Phillip Scifleet	Imrie Motorsport	Holden Commodore (VX)	1:25.7257
30	14	(Australia) Terry Wyhoon	Imrie Motorsport	Holden Commodore (VX)	1:27.4730
31	43	(Australia) David Krause	David Krause Racing	Holden Commodore (VX)	1:27.4856
32	99	(New Zealand) David Thexton	Thexton Motor Racing	Ford Falcon (BA)	1:27.7251
-	16	(Australia) Paul Weel	Paul Weel Racing	Holden Commodore (VY)	no time
-	20	(Australia) Mark Winterbottom	Larkham Motorsport	Ford Falcon (BA)	no time

=== Top Ten Shootout ===
Pos.	No.	Driver	Team	Car	Time
1	51	(New Zealand) Greg Murphy	John Kelly Racing	Holden Commodore (VY)	1:22.4672
2	50	(Australia) Jason Bright	Paul Weel Racing	Holden Commodore (VY)	1:22.9629
3	1	(Australia) Marcos Ambrose	Stone Brothers Racing	Ford Falcon (BA)	1:23.0463
4	12	(Australia) John Bowe	Brad Jones Racing	Ford Falcon (BA)	1:23.0659
5	34	(Australia) Garth Tander	Garry Rogers Motorsport	Holden Commodore (VY)	1:23.1914
6	888	(Brazil) Max Wilson	Triple Eight Race Engineering	Ford Falcon (BA)	1:23.5284
7	9	(Australia) Russell Ingall	Stone Brothers Racing	Ford Falcon (BA)	1:23.6547
8	31	(Australia) Steven Ellery	Steven Ellery Racing	Ford Falcon (BA)	1:23.7380
9	88	(New Zealand) Paul Radisich	Triple Eight Race Engineering	Ford Falcon (BA)	1:24.0422
10	44	(New Zealand) Simon Wills	Team Dynamik	Holden Commodore (VY)	1:28.3956

=== Race 1 ===
Pos	No	Driver	Team	Car	Laps	Time	Grid	Points
1	1	(Australia) Marcos Ambrose	Stone Brothers Racing	Ford Falcon (BA)	78	1hr 57min 38.7153sec	3	
2	11	(New Zealand) Steven Richards	Perkins Engineering	Holden Commodore (VY)	78	+ 8.709	12	
3	9	(Australia) Russell Ingall	Stone Brothers Racing	Ford Falcon (BA)	78	+ 13.943	7	
4	51	(New Zealand) Greg Murphy	John Kelly Racing	Holden Commodore (VY)	78	+ 22.326	1	
5	16	(Australia) Paul Weel	Paul Weel Racing	Holden Commodore (VY)	78	+ 30.132	30	
6	29	(Australia) Paul Morris	Paul Morris Motorsport	Holden Commodore (VY)	78	+ 33.511	18	
7	2	(Australia) Mark Skaife	Holden Racing Team	Holden Commodore (VY)	78	+ 33.534	13	
8	8	(Australia) Paul Dumbrell	Perkins Engineering	Holden Commodore (VX)	78	+ 34.866	21	
9	12	(Australia) John Bowe	Brad Jones Racing	Ford Falcon (BA)	78	+ 43.963	4	
10	5	(Australia) Glenn Seton	Ford Performance Racing	Ford Falcon (BA)	78	+ 47.283	20	
11	18	(Australia) Warren Luff	Dick Johnson Racing	Ford Falcon (BA)	78	+ 54.431	24	
12	15	(Australia) Rick Kelly	John Kelly Racing	Holden Commodore (VY)	78	+ 58.060	11	
13	21	(Australia) Brad Jones	Brad Jones Racing	Ford Falcon (BA)	78	+ 58.786	19	
14	50	(Australia) Jason Bright	Paul Weel Racing	Holden Commodore (VY)	78	+ 1:03.649	2	
15	20	(Australia) Mark Winterbottom	Larkham Motorsport	Ford Falcon (BA)	77	+ 1 lap	31	
16	021	(New Zealand) Craig Baird	Team Kiwi Racing	Holden Commodore (VY)	77	+ 1 lap	25	
17	33	(Australia) Cameron McConville	Garry Rogers Motorsport	Holden Commodore (VY)	76	+ 2 laps	22	
18	23	(Australia) David Besnard	WPS Racing	Ford Falcon (BA)	75	+ 3 laps	26	
19	34	(Australia) Garth Tander	Garry Rogers Motorsport	Holden Commodore (VY)	73	+ 5 laps	5	
20	17	(Australia) Steven Johnson	Dick Johnson Racing	Ford Falcon (BA)	61	+ 17 laps	15	
21	10	(Australia) Jason Bargwanna	Larkham Motorsport	Ford Falcon (BA)	59	+ 19 laps	16	
Ret	6	(Australia) Craig Lowndes	Ford Performance Racing	Ford Falcon (BA)	65	Retired	17	
Ret	888	(Brazil) Max Wilson	Triple Eight Race Engineering	Ford Falcon (BA)	48	Retired	6	
Ret	3	(New Zealand) Jason Richards	Tasman Motorsport	Holden Commodore (VX)	42	Retired	23	
Ret	44	(New Zealand) Simon Wills	Team Dynamik	Holden Commodore (VY)	39	Retired	10	
Ret	88	(New Zealand) Paul Radisich	Triple Eight Race Engineering	Ford Falcon (BA)	38	Retired	9	
Ret	75	(Australia) Anthony Tratt	Paul Little Racing	Holden Commodore (VY)	32	Retired	27	
Ret	31	(Australia) Steven Ellery	Steven Ellery Racing	Ford Falcon (BA)	27	Retired	8	
Ret	45	(Australia) Dale Brede	Team Dynamik	Holden Commodore (VY)	18	Retired	28	
Ret	24	(Australia) Phillip Scifleet	Imrie Motorsport	Holden Commodore (VX)	2	Retired	29	
Ret	22	(Australia) Todd Kelly	Holden Racing Team	Holden Commodore (VY)	1	Retired	14	

=== Race 2 ===
Pos	No	Driver	Team	Car	Laps	Time	Grid	Points
1	1	(Australia) Marcos Ambrose	Stone Brothers Racing	Ford Falcon (BA)	78	2hr 00min 31.4199sec	1	
2	11	(New Zealand) Steven Richards	Perkins Engineering	Holden Commodore (VY)	78	+ 1.704	2	
3	50	(Australia) Jason Bright	Paul Weel Racing	Holden Commodore (VY)	78	+ 2.241	14	
4	16	(Australia) Paul Weel	Paul Weel Racing	Holden Commodore (VY)	78	+ 6.481	5	
5	10	(Australia) Jason Bargwanna	Larkham Motorsport	Ford Falcon (BA)	78	+ 7.106	21	
6	15	(Australia) Rick Kelly	John Kelly Racing	Holden Commodore (VY)	78	+ 8.234	12	
7	88	(New Zealand) Paul Radisich	Triple Eight Race Engineering	Ford Falcon (BA)	78	+ 8.862	26	
8	3	(New Zealand) Jason Richards	Tasman Motorsport	Holden Commodore (VX)	78	+ 9.157	24	
9	51	(New Zealand) Greg Murphy	John Kelly Racing	Holden Commodore (VY)	78	+ 10.008	4	
10	22	(Australia) Todd Kelly	Holden Racing Team	Holden Commodore (VY)	78	+ 10.316	29	
11	8	(Australia) Paul Dumbrell	Perkins Engineering	Holden Commodore (VX)	78	+ 11.315	8	
12	021	(New Zealand) Craig Baird	Team Kiwi Racing	Holden Commodore (VY)	78	+ 26.693	16	
13	75	(Australia) Anthony Tratt	Paul Little Racing	Holden Commodore (VY)	77	+ 1 lap	27	
14	23	(Australia) David Besnard	WPS Racing	Ford Falcon (BA)	77	+ 1 lap	18	
15	12	(Australia) John Bowe	Brad Jones Racing	Ford Falcon (BA)	77	+ 1 lap	9	
16	29	(Australia) Paul Morris	Paul Morris Motorsport	Holden Commodore (VY)	75	+ 3 laps	6	
17	2	(Australia) Mark Skaife	Holden Racing Team	Holden Commodore (VY)	71	+ 7 laps	7	
Ret	33	(Australia) Cameron McConville	Garry Rogers Motorsport	Holden Commodore (VY)	66	Accident	17	
Ret	20	(Australia) Mark Winterbottom	Larkham Motorsport	Ford Falcon (BA)	66	Accident	15	
Ret	21	(Australia) Brad Jones	Brad Jones Racing	Ford Falcon (BA)	66	Accident	13	
Ret	17	(Australia) Steven Johnson	Dick Johnson Racing	Ford Falcon (BA)	65	Accident	20	
Ret	888	(Brazil) Max Wilson	Triple Eight Race Engineering	Ford Falcon (BA)	51	Retired	23	
Ret	44	(New Zealand) Simon Wills	Team Dynamik	Holden Commodore (VY)	47	Retired	25	
Ret	6	(Australia) Craig Lowndes	Ford Performance Racing	Ford Falcon (BA)	29	Retired	22	
Ret	18	(Australia) Warren Luff	Dick Johnson Racing	Ford Falcon (BA)	16	Retired	11	
Ret	9	(Australia) Russell Ingall	Stone Brothers Racing	Ford Falcon (BA)	10	Retired	3	
Ret	5	(Australia) Glenn Seton	Ford Performance Racing	Ford Falcon (BA)	10	Retired	10	
Ret	31	(Australia) Steven Ellery	Steven Ellery Racing	Ford Falcon (BA)	2	Retired	28	
DNS	45	(Australia) Dale Brede	Team Dynamik	Holden Commodore (VY)		Did not start		
DNS	34	(Australia) Garth Tander	Garry Rogers Motorsport	Holden Commodore (VY)		Did not start		
DNS	24	(Australia) Phillip Scifleet	Imrie Motorsport	Holden Commodore (VX)		Did not start		

V8 Supercar Championship Series
Previous race: 2003 V8 Supercars Main Event	2004 season	Next race: 2004 Eastern Creek V8 Supercar Round
