= 1995 Australian Suzuki Swift Series =

Seasons
- ← none 2011 →

The 1995 Kumho Tyres Suzuki Cup was the first running of the series. It was based around nine rounds following the 1995 Australian Touring Car Championship and Australian Super Touring Championship trail. Over 32 cars entered the series which was won by speedway driver Adam Clarke. The series was supported by Suzuki importer Ateco and launched the careers of NASCAR Truck driver Clarke, V8 Supercar drivers Warren Luff, Phillip Scifleet, Damian White and Anthony Robson as well as Formula 3000 competitor Andrej Pavicevic and A1 Grand Prix driver Christian Jones.

== Calendar ==
The series started at Oran Park in April, finishing ate the Bathurst 1000 weekend in October.

Rd.	Support	Circuit / State	Date	Winner
1	Australian Super Touring Championship	Oran Park Raceway, New South Wales	2 April	?
2	Australian Touring Car Championship	Lakeside Raceway, Queensland	23 April	?
3	Australian Touring Car Championship	Winton Raceway, Victoria	21 May	Adam Clarke
4	?	?	?	?
5	?	?	?	?
6	?	?	?	?
7	?	?	?	?
8	?	?	?	?
9	Bathurst 1000	Bathurst, New South Wales	1 Oct	?

== Drivers ==
No.	Driver
2	Warren Luff
3	Glen Mason
4	Paul Burfitt
6	Paul Roman
7	Joshua Dowling
10	Chris Oxley
12	Michael Simpson
13	Anthony Robson
15	Ric Shaw
17	Andrej Pavicevic
18	Darren Palmer
19	Jon Muir
20	Brett Howard
21	Nigel Stones
22	Phillip Scifleet
23	Barrie Nesbitt
24	Tania Gulson
25	Richard Buttrose
27	Christian Jones
29	Bruce Field
30	Toby Hagon
31	Damian White
32	Adam Clarke
