= 2012 Australian Suzuki Swift Series =

Australian motor racing series

Seasons
- ← 2011 2013 →

The 2012 Hi Tech Oils Australian Swift Series is the third running of the series in Australia. It will be based around eight rounds in four different states, featuring for the second year the Suzuki Swift Sport RS416 model.

Round 1 at Sydney's Eastern Creek Grand Prix Circuit saw Queenslander and reigning champion Allan Jarvis take pole position and win all three races. Second for the weekend was Country Music singer Adam Brand with rookie Reece Murphy third.

Round 2 was held at Mallala Motor Sport Park in South Australia the week after Easter. Current Champion Allan Jarvis won race 1 with newcomer Reece Murphy winning races 2 and 3 and also took the round victory. Second for the weekend was Rob Jarvis with his son Allan Jarvis third.

In between Mallala and Winton, a Non-Championship round was held at Queensland's Lakeside Raceway. Championship leader Allan Jarvis won the weekend with newcomers Dale Corbett second and Brandon Porch third.

Round 3 held at Winton Raceway proved a difficult weekend for drivers with Friday and Saturday being dry and race day Sunday wet. Series regular Reece Murphy clawed his way back into contention for the title with a consistent drive to finish second for the round behind newcomer Damian Ward. Third went to veteran Rob Jarvis with his son Allan finishing fifth and holds onto the championship lead by only two points.

Round 4 rolled into Sydney Motorsport Park in New South Wales under sunny skies. Brooke Leech withdrew after a breaking her knee in a karting accident and Perth's Brett Stewart also after competing in Townsville the week before. Former V8 Supercar driver Richard Mork rejoined the series as did Production Car veteran Brendon Cook. Series regular Reece Murphy had his way for most of the weekend with two wins and a second place pushing him to the lead of the championship. Defending champion Allan Jarvis was second with Adam Brand third.

Round 5 moved to Queensland Raceway in August for the first time. Defending series champion Allan Jarvis hit back with a win by one point over Round 4 winner Reece Murphy. Damian Ward rounded out the podium. Brooke Leech returned to the series after recovering from her karting accident.

Round 6 moved to New South Wales' Wakefield Park, a short drive from the nation's capital of Canberra. Damian Ward won the weekend with two race wins from Reece Murphy and current champion Allan Jarvis. The final round will be held at Sandown, Victoria.

== Calendar ==
The 2012 Australian Swift Series will be contested over eight rounds, starting at Eastern Creek in March and finishing at Sandown in November.

Rd.	Supporting	Circuit / State	Date	Winner
1	Shannons Nationals Motor Racing Championships	Eastern Creek Raceway, New South Wales	9–11 March	Allan Jarvis
2	Shannons Nationals Motor Racing Championships	Mallala Motor Sport Park, South Australia	13–15 April	Reece Murphy
NC	Queensland Raceways Drivers Championship	Lakeside Raceway, Queensland	26–27 May	Allan Jarvis
3	Shannons Nationals Motor Racing Championships	Winton Raceway, Victoria	22–24 June	Damian Ward
4	Shannons Nationals Motor Racing Championships	Sydney Motorsport Park, New South Wales	13–15 July	Reece Murphy
5	Shannons Nationals Motor Racing Championships	Queensland Raceway, Queensland	10–12 August	Allan Jarvis
6	Shannons Nationals Motor Racing Championships	Wakefield Park, New South Wales	12–14 October	Damian Ward
7	Shannons Nationals Motor Racing Championships	Sandown, Victoria	23–25 November	Allan Jarvis

== Driver standings ==
=== Points system ===
Points are awarded to the driver or drivers of a car that start any race.

Position	1st	2nd	3rd	4th	5th	6th	7th	8th	9th	10th	11th	12th	13th	14th	15th	16th	17th	18th	19th	20th	21st	22nd	23rd	24th	25th	26th	27th	28th	29th	30th	31st	All other finishes
Points	39	35	31	29	28	27	26	25	24	23	22	21	20	19	18	17	16	15	14	13	12	11	10	9	8	7	6	5	4	3	2	1

Pos	Driver	Rd 1	Rd 2	NC	Rd 3	Rd 4	Rd 5	Rd 6	Rd 7	Pts
Series entrants
1	Allan Jarvis	117	98	1st	87	105	106	95	109	717
2	Reece Murphy	92	109		99	113	105	105	93	716
3	Rob Jarvis	90	99	8th	93	85	82	80	84	613
4	Damian Ward				109	91	94	109	93	496
5	Adam Brand	99	94			89				193
6	Ben Foessel					76	78	79		233
7	Callum Sayers						87	DNS	103	190
8	Brett Stewart		86		90	WD				176
9	Scott Gore							88	83	171
10	Dale Corbett			2nd	83		83			166
11	Brooke Leech				81	WD	83			164
12	Jamie MacMaster						74	78	0	152
13	Fernando Wierhl	88								88
14	Mick Gore							86	0	86
15	Brendon Cook					82				82
16	Robbie Bolger	81								81
17	Richard Mork					79				79
18	Samantha Reid				78					78
19	Colin Bradley	77								77
20	Ken Dalton	51								51
–	Justin Johns	WD	DNS							–
–	Dale Campaign		DNS							–
–	Matthew Nolan							DNS		–
–	Brandon Porch			3rd						–
-	Bronte Michael			4th						–
–	Chris Corbett			5th						–
–	Lucus Ward			6th						–
–	Aaron Everett			7th						–
Pos	Driver	Rd 1	Rd 2	NC	Rd 3	Rd 4	Rd 5	Rd 6	Rd 7	Pts

Colour	Result
Gold	Winner
Silver	Second place
Bronze	Third place
Green	Points classification
Blue	Non-points classification
Blue	Non-classified finish (NC)
Purple	Retired, not classified (Ret)
Red	Did not qualify (DNQ)
Red	Did not pre-qualify (DNPQ)
Black	Disqualified (DSQ)
White	Did not start (DNS)
White	Withdrew (WD)
White	Race cancelled (C)
Blank	Did not practice (DNP)
Blank	Did not arrive (DNA)
Blank	Excluded (EX)
