= Warren Luff =

Australian racing driver (born 1976)

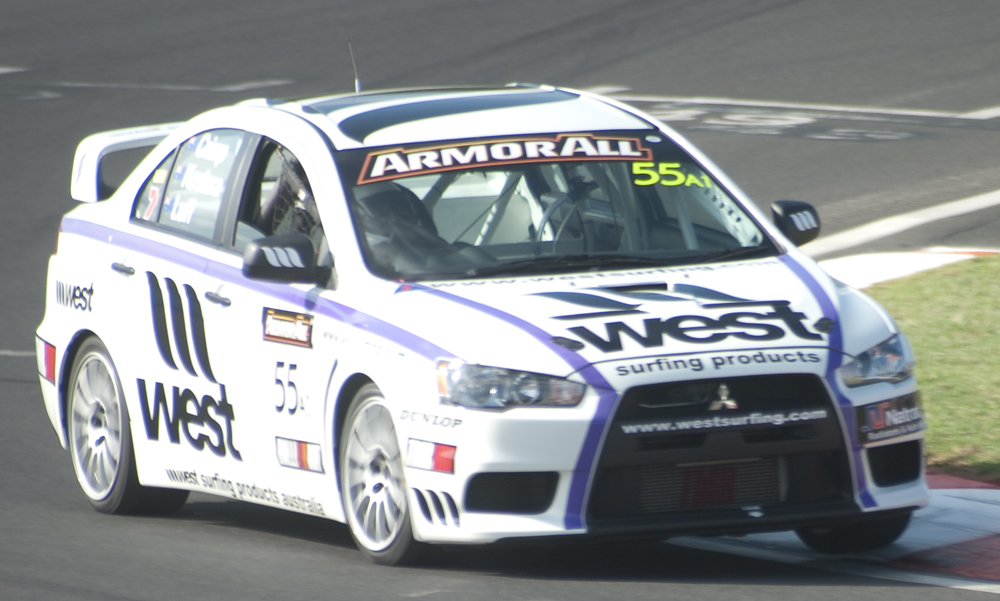
- Nationality: Australian
- Born: Warren Raymond Luff; 21 April 1976 (age 50) Sydney, New South Wales
- Categorisation: FIA Silver (until 2016, 2019–); FIA Gold (2017–2018)

Supercars Championship career
- Current team: Team 18 (Endurance race co-driver)
- Championships: 0
- Races: 130
- Wins: 3
- Podiums: 11
- Pole positions: 0
- 2019 position: 28th (258 pts)

Warren Raymond Luff (born 21 April 1976), is best known as a race driver, stunt driver and driver training instructor. He is the son of well-known driver training instructor Ian Luff. He previously co-drived for Team 18 in the Repco Supercars Championship with David Reynolds in the No. 20 Chevrolet Camaro ZL1.

After starting in the Improved Production category in the early 1990s, he progressed to the Australian Super Touring Championship in 1997 & 1998 and his V8 Supercar debut was at the 1999 Queensland 500. He then joined various one make categories with great success. He was champion of the Australian Mitsubishi Mirage Cup in 1999 and 2000, then champion in the Brute Utes series in 2002 and 2003, as well as one off's in the Porsche 944 Challenge in 2003 and the Australian Mini Challenge in 2009 and 2010 seasons.

On 16 September 2012, Luff won his first ever V8 Supercars race, teaming up with Vodafone's Craig Lowndes at the Sandown 500. On 7 October 2012, Luff and Lowndes finished 3rd in the Supercheap Bathurst 1000, the 50th running of the event, where their car ran special Peter Brock livery to commemorate the history of Bathurst and Lowndes' mentor. In 2013, again with Lowndes, Luff won the inaugural Enduro Cup. For 2014, Luff teamed up with Garth Tander to contest the 2014 Pirtek Enduro Cup for the Holden Racing Team. Tander and Luff joined forces again in 2015, and despite not winning a race, won the 2015 Enduro Cup, resulting in Luff becoming the first driver to win the award twice.

== Career results ==
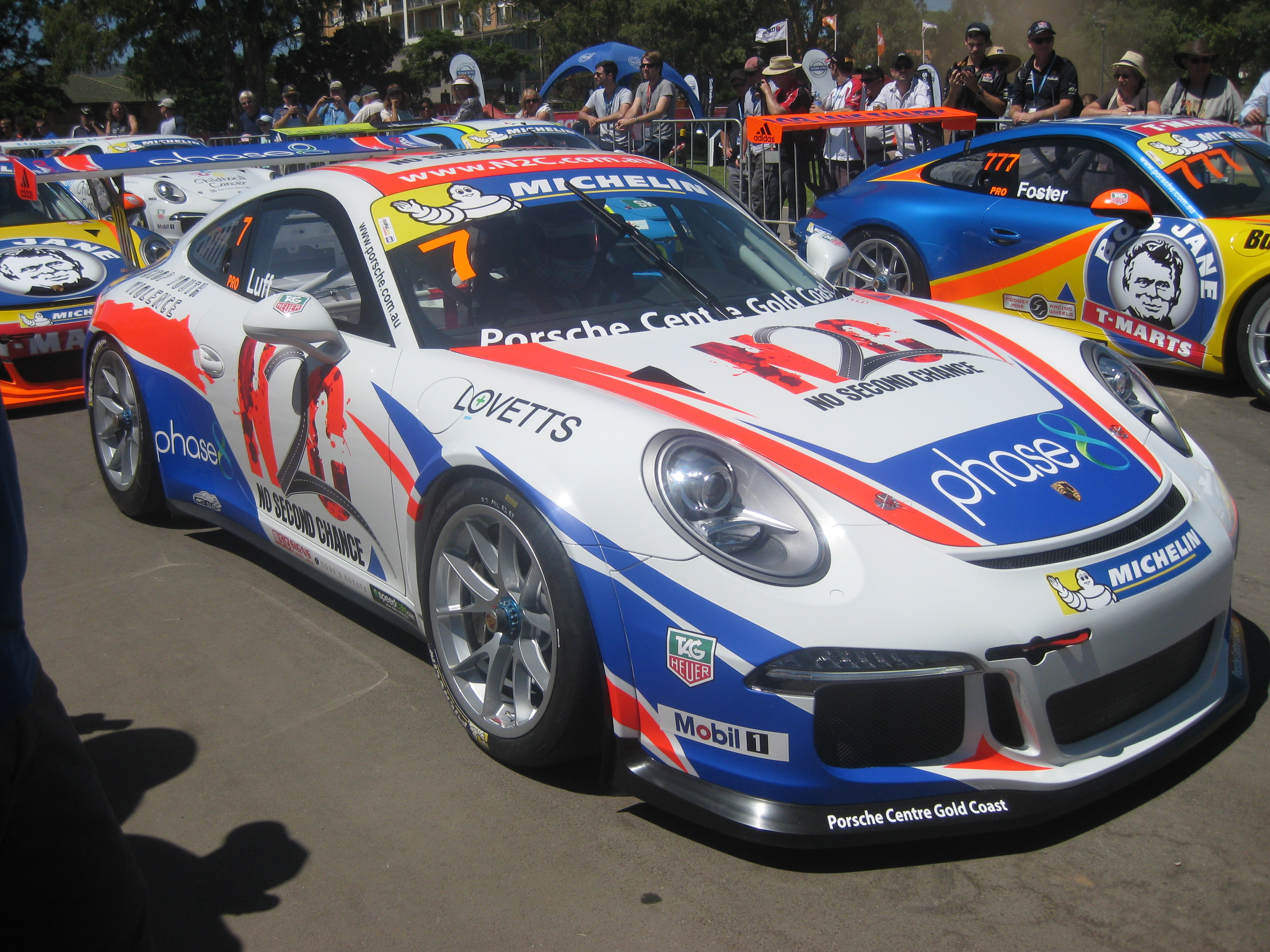
Luff placed second in the 2014 Australian Carrera Cup Championship.

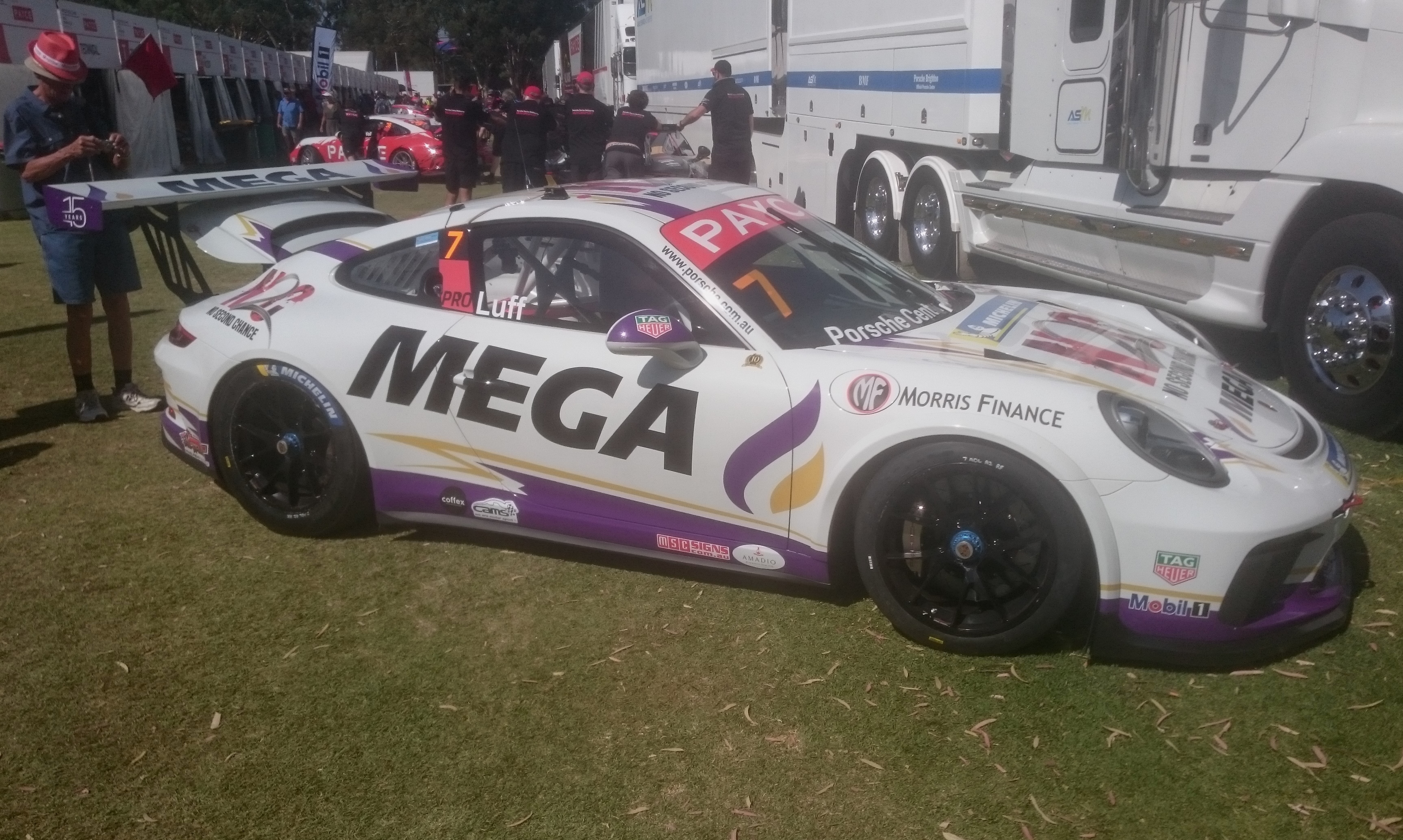
Luff placed eighth in the 2019 Porsche Carrera Cup Australia.

Season	Series	Position	Car	Team
1995	Australian Suzuki Swift Series	4th	Suzuki Swift GTi	Ian Luff Motivation
1999	Australian Mitsubishi Mirage Series	**1st**	Mitsubishi Mirage RS	Ian Luff Motivation
1999	Australian GT Production Car Championship - Class E	5th	Peugeot 306 Style	Northshore Rallysport
2000	Australian Mitsubishi Mirage Series	**1st**	Mitsubishi Mirage RS	Ian Luff Motivation
2000	Australian GT Production Car Championship - Class E	**3rd**	Peugeot 306 Style	Northshore Rallysport
2002	V8 Brute Utes Series	**1st**	Ford AU Falcon XR8 Ute	Coopers Racing
2002	V8 Supercar Championship Series	58th	Holden VX Commodore	Lansvale Racing Team
2003	V8 Brute Utes Series	**1st**	Ford AU Falcon XR8 Ute	Coopers Racing
2003	V8 Supercar Championship Series	49th	Ford BA Falcon	Dick Johnson Racing
2004	V8 Supercar Championship Series	21st	Ford BA Falcon	Dick Johnson Racing
2005	V8 Supercar Development Series	**2nd**	Ford BA Falcon	Paul Cruickshank Racing
2005	V8 Supercar Championship Series	55th	Ford BA Falcon	Stone Brothers Racing
2006	V8 Supercar Championship Series	27th	Ford BA Falcon	Britek Motorsport
2007	V8 Supercar Championship Series	60th	Ford BF Falcon	Britek Motorsport
2008	V8 Supercar Championship Series	37th	Ford BF Falcon	Dick Johnson Racing
2009	V8 Supercar Championship Series	48th	Ford FG Falcon	Dick Johnson Racing
2009	Australian Mini Challenge	21st	Mini John Cooper Works Challenge	Decorug Racing
2010	V8 Supercar Championship Series	28th	Ford FG Falcon; Holden VE Commodore	Dick Johnson Racing; Lucas Dumbrell Motorsport
2010	Australian Mini Challenge	19th	Mini John Cooper Works Challenge	McElrea Racing
2011	International V8 Supercars Championship	28th	Holden VE Commodore	Lucas Dumbrell Motorsport
2012	International V8 Supercars Championship	30th	Holden VE Commodore	Triple Eight Race Engineering
2012	V8 Ute Racing Series	41st	Holden VE Ute SS	Auto One Wildcard
2012	Australian GT Championship	19th	Audi R8 LMS	Melbourne Performance Centre
2013	Australian Carrera Cup Championship	**3rd**	Porsche 997 GT3 Cup	McElrea Racing
2013	International V8 Supercars Championship	29th	Holden VF Commodore	Triple Eight Race Engineering
2013	Australian GT Championship	28th	Audi R8 LMS Ultra	Melbourne Performance Centre
2013	V8SuperTourers Championship	40th	Ford FG Falcon	John McIntyre Racing
2014	Australian Carrera Cup Championship	**2nd**	Porsche 911 GT3 Cup Type 991	No Second Chance / Phase 8
2014	Australian GT Championship	17th	Audi R8 LMS Ultra	JAMEC PEM Racing
2014	International V8 Supercars Championship	38th	Holden VF Commodore	Holden Racing Team
2015	Australian GT Championship	40th	Porsche 911 GT3 Cup Car; McLaren 650S GT3	Fastway Couriers; Objective Racing
2015	International V8 Supercars Championship	27th	Holden VF Commodore	Holden Racing Team
2016	International V8 Supercars Championship	37th	Holden VF Commodore	Holden Racing Team
2016	Australian Endurance Championship	21st	McLaren 650S GT3	McElrea Racing
2017	Virgin Australia Supercars Championship	33rd	Holden VF Commodore	Walkinshaw Racing
2018	Virgin Australia Supercars Championship	31st	Holden ZB Commodore	Walkinshaw Andretti United
2019	Porsche Carrera Cup Australia	8th	Porsche 911 GT3	McElrea Racing
2019	Virgin Australia Supercars Championship	29th	Holden ZB Commodore	Walkinshaw Andretti United
2020	Virgin Australia Supercars Championship	28th	Holden ZB Commodore	Walkinshaw Andretti United
2021	Repco Supercars Championship	32nd	Holden ZB Commodore	Walkinshaw Andretti United
2022	Repco Supercars Championship	52nd	Holden ZB Commodore	Walkinshaw Andretti United

=== Super2 Series results ===
(Races in bold indicate pole position) (Races in italics indicate fastest lap)

Super2 Series results
Year	Team	No.	Car	1	2	3	4	5	6	7	8	9	10	11	12	13	14	15	16	17	18	Position	Points
2003	Dick Johnson Racing	71	Ford AU Falcon	WAK; R1	WAK; R2	WAK; R3	ADE; R4	EAS; R5	EAS; R6	EAS; R7	PHI; R8	PHI; R9	PHI; R10	WIN; R11	WIN; R12	WIN; R13	MAL; R14; 5	MAL; R15; 6	MAL; R16; 5			NC	0
2005	Paul Cruickshank Racing	60	Ford BA Falcon	ADE; R1; 9	ADE; R2; 9	WAK; R3; 2	WAK; R4; 8	WAK; R5; 2	EAS; R6; 3	EAS; R7; 2	EAS; R8; 2	QLD; R9; 3	QLD; R10; 2	QLD; R11; 3	MAL; R12; 3	MAL; R13; Ret	MAL; R14; 6	BAT; R15; 2	BAT; R16; C	PHI; R17; 4	PHI; R18; 3	2nd	1068

=== Supercars Championship results ===
(Races in bold indicate pole position) (Races in italics indicate fastest lap)

Supercars results
Year	Team	No.	Car	1	2	3	4	5	6	7	8	9	10	11	12	13	14	15	16	17	18	19	20	21	22	23	24	25	26	27	28	29	30	31	32	33	34	35	36	37	38	39	Position	Points
2002	Lansvale Racing Team	3	Holden VX Commodore	ADE; R1	ADE; R2	PHI; R3	PHI; R4	EAS; R5	EAS; R6	EAS; R7	HDV; R8	HDV; R9	HDV; R10	CAN; R11	CAN; R12	CAN; R13	BAR; R14	BAR; R15	BAR; R16	ORA; R17	ORA; R18	WIN; R19	WIN; R20	QLD; R21; Ret	BAT; R22; 15	SUR; R23	SUR; R24	PUK; R25	PUK; R26	PUK; R27	SAN; R28	SAN; R29											57th	36
2003	Dick Johnson Racing	17	Ford BA Falcon	ADE; R1	ADE; R1	PHI; R3	EAS; R4	WIN; R5	BAR; R6	BAR; R7	BAR; R8	HDV; R9	HDV; R10	HDV; R11	QLD; R12	ORA; R13	SAN; R14; 15	BAT; R15; 13	SUR; R16	SUR; R17	PUK; R18	PUK; R19	PUK; R20	EAS; R21	EAS; R22																		50th	144
2004	Dick Johnson Racing	18	Ford BA Falcon	ADE; R1; 11	ADE; R2; Ret	EAS; R3; 21	PUK; R4; 24	PUK; R5; 27	PUK; R6; 23	HDV; R7; 22	HDV; R8; 22	HDV; R9; 24	BAR; R10; 15	BAR; R11; Ret	BAR; R12; 23	QLD; R13; 16	WIN; R14; 20	ORA; R15; 24	ORA; R16; 20	SAN; R17; 3	BAT; R18; 7	SUR; R19; Ret	SUR; R20; 26	SYM; R21; 16	SYM; R22; 12	SYM; R23; 9	EAS; R24; 15	EAS; R25; 14	EAS; R26; 20														21st	1149
2005	Stone Brothers Racing	1	Ford BA Falcon	ADE; R1	ADE; R2	PUK; R3	PUK; R4	PUK; R5	BAR; R6	BAR; R7	BAR; R8	EAS; R9	EAS; R10	SHA; R11	SHA; R12	SHA; R13	HDV; R14	HDV; R15	HDV; R16	QLD; R17	ORA; R18	ORA; R19	SAN; R20; 14	BAT; R21; Ret	SUR; R22	SUR; R23	SUR; R24	SYM; R25	SYM; R26	SYM; R27	PHI; R28	PHI; R29	PHI; R30										55th	140
2006	Britek Motorsport	25	Ford BA Falcon	ADE; R1; 17	ADE; R2; 16	PUK; R3; 24	PUK; R4; 22	PUK; R5; 26	BAR; R6; 23	BAR; R7; 26	BAR; R8; 27	WIN; R9; 21	WIN; R10; 18	WIN; R11; 28	HDV; R12; 31	**HDV**; **R13**; 4	HDV; R14; 27	QLD; R15; 23	QLD; R16; 16	QLD; R17; 28	ORA; R18; 22	ORA; R19; Ret	ORA; R20; 18	SAN; R21; 23	BAT; R22; Ret	SUR; R23; 24	SUR; R24; Ret	SUR; R25; Ret	SYM; R26; 23	SYM; R27; 22	SYM; R28; 20	BHR; R29; 18	BHR; R30; 17	BHR; R31; 21	PHI; R32; 17	PHI; R33; 13	PHI; R34; 28						27th	1238
2007	Britek Motorsport	26	Ford BF Falcon	ADE; R1	ADE; R2	BAR; R3	BAR; R4	BAR; R5	PUK; R6	PUK; R7	PUK; R8	WIN; R9	WIN; R10	WIN; R11	EAS; R12	EAS; R13	EAS; R14	HDV; R15	HDV; R16	HDV; R17	QLD; R18	QLD; R19	QLD; R20	ORA; R21	ORA; R22	ORA; R23	SAN; R24; Ret	BAT; R25; Ret	SUR; R26	SUR; R27	SUR; R28	BHR; R29	BHR; R30	BHR; R31	SYM; R32	SYM; R33	SYM; R34	PHI; R35	PHI; R36	PHI; R37			NC	0
2008	Dick Johnson Racing	17	Ford BF Falcon	ADE; R1	ADE; R2	EAS; R3; PO	EAS; R4; PO	EAS; R5; PO	HAM; R6	HAM; R7	HAM; R8	BAR; R9	BAR; R10	BAR; R11	SAN; R12; PO	SAN; R13; PO	SAN; R14; PO	HDV; R15	HDV; R16	HDV; R17	QLD; R18	QLD; R19	QLD; R20	WIN; R21	WIN; R22	WIN; R23	PHI; Q 18	PHI; R24; 22	BAT; R25; 11	SUR; R26	SUR; R27	SUR; R28	BHR; R29	BHR; R30	BHR; R31	SYM; R32	SYM; R33	SYM; R34	ORA; R35	ORA; R36	ORA; R37		37th	259
2009	Dick Johnson Racing	18	Ford FG Falcon	ADE; R1	ADE; R2	HAM; R3	HAM; R4	WIN; R5	WIN; R6	SYM; R7	SYM; R8	HDV; R9	HDV; R10	TOW; R11	TOW; R12	SAN; R13	SAN; R14	QLD; R15	QLD; R16	PHI; Q 17	PHI; R17; 6	BAT; R18; Ret	SUR; R19	SUR; R20	SUR; R21	SUR; R22	PHI; R23	PHI; R24	BAR; R25	BAR; R26	SYD; R27	SYD; R28											47th	182
2010	Dick Johnson Racing	18	Ford FG Falcon	YMC; R1	YMC; R2	BHR; R3	BHR; R4	ADE; R5	ADE; R6	HAM; R7	HAM; R8	QLD; R9	QLD; R10	WIN; R11	WIN; R12	HDV; R13	HDV; R14	TOW; R15	TOW; R16	PHI; QR; Ret	PHI; R17; 12	BAT; R18; 5	SUR; R19; 10	SUR; R20; 4																			28th	721
2010	Lucas Dumbrell Motorsport	30	Holden VE Commodore																						SYM; R21; 25	SYM; R22; 21	SAN; R23; 27	SAN; R24; Ret	SYD; R25; Ret	SYD; R26; 18													28th	721
2011	Lucas Dumbrell Motorsport	30	Holden VE Commodore	YMC; R1; 23	YMC; R2; 17	ADE; R3; 21	ADE; R4; Ret	HAM; R5; Ret	HAM; R6; 16	BAR; R7; 26	BAR; R8; 25	BAR; R9; 25	WIN; R10; Ret	WIN; R11; 22	HID; R12; 24	HID; R13; 23	TOW; R14; Ret	TOW; R15; 21	QLD; R16; 27	QLD; R17; 24	QLD; R18; 23	PHI; R19; 27	BAT; R20; 15	SUR; R21; Ret	SUR; R22; Ret	SYM; R23; 26	SYM; R24; 28	SAN; R25; 22	SAN; R26; 24	SYD; R27; 15	SYD; R28; Ret												28th	809
2012	Triple Eight Race Engineering	888	Holden VE Commodore	ADE; R1	ADE; R2	SYM; R3	SYM; R4	HAM; R5	HAM; R6	BAR; R7	BAR; R8	BAR; R9	PHI; R10	PHI; R11	HID; R12	HID; R13	TOW; R14	TOW; R15	QLD; R16	QLD; R17	SMP; R18	SMP; R19	SAN; QR; 5	SAN; R20; 1	BAT; R21; 3	SUR; R22	SUR; R23	YMC; R24	YMC; R25	YMC; R26	WIN; R27	WIN; R28	SYD; R29	SYD; R30									30th	527
2013	Triple Eight Race Engineering	888	Holden VF Commodore	ADE; R1	ADE; R2	SYM; R3	SYM; R4	SYM; R5	PUK; R6	PUK; R7	PUK; R8	PUK; R9	BAR; R10	BAR; R11	BAR; R12	COA; R13	COA; R14	COA; R15	COA; R16	HID; R17	HID; R18	HID; R19	TOW; R20	TOW; R21	QLD; R22; PO	QLD; R23; PO	QLD; R24; PO	WIN; R25	WIN; R26	WIN; R27	SAN; QR; 5	SAN; R28; 2	BAT; R29; 3	**SUR**; **R30**; 1	SUR; R31; 8	PHI; R32	PHI; R33	PHI; R34	SYD; R35	SYD; R36			29th	774
2014	Holden Racing Team	2	Holden VF Commodore	ADE; R1	ADE; R2	ADE; R3	SYM; R4	SYM; R5	SYM; R6	WIN; R7	WIN; R8	WIN; R9	PUK; R10	PUK; R11	PUK; R12	PUK; R13	BAR; R14	BAR; R15	BAR; R16	HID; R17	HID; R18	HID; R19	TOW; R20	TOW; R21	TOW; R22	QLD; R23	QLD; R24	QLD; R25	SMP; R26	SMP; R27	SMP; R28	SAN; QR; 6	SAN; R29; 3	BAT; R30; Ret	SUR; R31; 9	SUR; R32; 12	PHI; R33	PHI; R34	PHI; R35	SYD; R36	SYD; R37	SYD; R38	38th	411
2015	Holden Racing Team	2	Holden VF Commodore	ADE; R1	ADE; R2	ADE; R3	SYM; R4	SYM; R5	SYM; R6	BAR; R7	BAR; R8	BAR; R9	WIN; R10	WIN; R11	WIN; R12	HID; R13	HID; R14	HID; R15	TOW; R16	TOW; R17	QLD; R18	QLD; R19	QLD; R20	SMP; R21	SMP; R22	SMP; R23	SAN; QR; 16	SAN; R24; 4	BAT; R25; 3	SUR; R26; 4	SUR; R27; 3	PUK; R28	PUK; R29	PUK; R30	PHI; R31	PHI; R32	PHI; R33	SYD; R34	SYD; R35	SYD; R36			27th	747
2016	Holden Racing Team	2	Holden VF Commodore	ADE; R1	ADE; R2	ADE; R3	SYM; R4	SYM; R5	PHI; R6	PHI; R7	BAR; R8	BAR; R9	WIN; R10	WIN; R11	HID; R12	HID; R13	TOW; R14	TOW; R15	QLD; R16	QLD; R17	SMP; R18	SMP; R19	SAN; QR; 3	SAN; R20; 1	BAT; R21; Ret	SUR; R22; 15	SUR; R23; 11	PUK; R24	PUK; R25	PUK; R26	PUK; R27	SYD; R28	SYD; R29										38th	432
2017	Walkinshaw Racing	2	Holden VF Commodore	ADE; R1	ADE; R2	SYM; R3	SYM; R4	PHI; R5	PHI; R6	BAR; R7	BAR; R8	WIN; R9	WIN; R10	HID; R11	HID; R12	TOW; R13	TOW; R14	QLD; R15	QLD; R16	SMP; R17	SMP; R18	SAN; Q 15	SAN; R19; 21	BAT; R20; 2	SUR; R21; 11	SUR; R22; 13	PUK; R23	PUK; R24	NEW; R25	NEW; R26													33rd	498
2018	Walkinshaw Andretti United	2	Holden ZB Commodore	ADE; R1	ADE; R2	MEL; R3	MEL; R4	MEL; R5	MEL; R6	SYM; R7	SYM; R8	PHI; R9	PHI; R10	BAR; R11	BAR; R12	WIN; R13	WIN; R14	HID; R15	HID; R16	TOW; R17	TOW; R18	QLD; R19	QLD; R20	SMP; R21	BEN; R22	BEN; R23	SAN; R24; 22	SAN; R24; 6	BAT; R25; 2	SUR; R26; 13	SUR; R27; C	PUK; R28	PUK; R29	NEW; R30	NEW; R31								31st	546
2019	Walkinshaw Andretti United	2	Holden ZB Commodore	ADE; R1	ADE; R2	MEL; R3	MEL; R4	MEL; R5	MEL; R6	SYM; R7	SYM; R8	PHI; R9	PHI; R10	BAR; R11	BAR; R12	WIN; R13	WIN; R14	HID; R15	HID; R16	TOW; R17	TOW; R18	QLD; R19	QLD; R20	BEN; R21	BEN; R22	PUK; R23	PUK; R24	BAT; R25; 7	SUR; R26; 5	SUR; R27; 4	SAN; QR; 11	SAN; R28; 5	NEW; R29; PO	NEW; R30; PO									29th	632
2020	Walkinshaw Andretti United	25	Holden ZB Commodore	ADE; R1	ADE; R2	MEL; R3	MEL; R4	MEL; R5	MEL; R6	SMP1; R7	SMP1; R8	SMP1; R9	SMP2; R10	SMP2; R11	SMP2; R12	HID1; R13	HID1; R14	HID1; R15	HID2; R16	HID2; R17	HID2; R18	TOW1; R19	TOW1; R20	TOW1; R21	TOW2; R22	TOW2; R23	TOW2; R24	BEN1; R25	BEN1; R26	BEN1; R27	BEN2; R28	BEN2; R29	BEN2; R30	BAT; R31; 3									28th	258
2021	Walkinshaw Andretti United	2	Holden ZB Commodore	BAT1; R1	BAT1; R2	SAN; R3	SAN; R4	SAN; R5	SYM; R6	SYM; R7	SYM; R8	BEN; R9	BEN; R10	BEN; R11	HID; R12	HID; R13	HID; R14	TOW1; R15	TOW1; R16	TOW2; R17	TOW2; R18	TOW2; R19	SMP1; R20	SMP1; R21	SMP1; R22	SMP2; R23	SMP2; R24	SMP2; R25	SMP3; R26	SMP3; R27	SMP3; R28	SMP4; R29	SMP4; R30	BAT2; R31; 5									32nd	222
2022	Walkinshaw Andretti United	2	Holden ZB Commodore	SMP; R1	SMP; R2	SYM; R3	SYM; R4	SYM; R5	MEL; R6	MEL; R7	MEL; R8	MEL; R9	BAR; R10	BAR; R11	BAR; R12	WIN; R13	WIN; R14	WIN; R15	HID; R16	HID; R17	HID; R18	TOW; R19	TOW; R20	BEN; R21	BEN; R22	BEN; R23	SAN; R24; PO	SAN; R25; PO	SAN; R26; PO	PUK; R27	PUK; R28	PUK; R29	BAT; R30; 22	SUR; R31	SUR; R32	NEW; R33	NEW; R34						52nd	78
2023	Team 18	20	Chevrolet Camaro ZL1	NEW; R1	NEW; R2	MEL; R3	MEL; R4	MEL; R5	MEL; R6	BAR; R7	BAR; R8	BAR; R9	SYM; R10	SYM; R11	SYM; R12	HID; R13	HID; R14	HID; R15	TOW; R16	TOW; R17	SMP; R18	SMP; R19	BEN; R20	BEN; R21	BEN; R22	SAN; R23; 21	BAT; R24; 17	SUR; R25	SUR; R26	ADE; R27	ADE; R28												46th	192
2024	Team 18	20	Chevrolet Camaro ZL1	BAT1; R1	BAT1; R2	MEL; R3	MEL; R4	MEL; R5	MEL; R6	TAU; R7	TAU; R8	BAR; R9	BAR; R10	HID; R11	HID; R12	TOW; R13	TOW; R14	SMP; R15	SMP; R16	BEN; R17	BEN; R18	SAN; R19; 8	BAT; R20; 24	SUR; R21	SUR; R22	ADE; R23	ADE; R24																38th	246

=== Complete Bathurst 1000 results ===
Year	Team	Car	Co-driver	Position	Laps
1997*	FAI Insurance	Honda Accord	(United Kingdom) Julian Bailey	10th	138
1998*	Knight Racing	Ford Mondeo	(Australia) Mark Zonneveld	DNF	18
2002	Lansvale Racing Team	Holden Commodore VX	(Australia) Cameron McConville	15th	159
2003	Dick Johnson Racing	Ford Falcon BA	(Australia) Steven Johnson	13th	156
2004	Dick Johnson Racing	Ford Falcon BA	(Australia) Steven Johnson	7th	161
2005	Stone Brothers Racing	Ford Falcon BA	(Australia) Marcos Ambrose	DNF	144
2006	Britek Motorsport	Ford Falcon BA	(Australia) Adam Macrow	DNF	102
2007	Britek Motorsport	Ford Falcon BF	(Australia) Alan Gurr	DNF	134
2008	Dick Johnson Racing	Ford Falcon BF	(Australia) Steve Owen	11th	161
2009	Dick Johnson Racing	Ford Falcon FG	(Australia) Jonathon Webb	DNF	84
2010	Dick Johnson Racing	Ford Falcon FG	(Australia) James Courtney	5th	161
2011	Lucas Dumbrell Motorsport	Holden Commodore VE	(Australia) Nathan Pretty	15th	161
2012	Triple Eight Race Engineering	Holden Commodore VE	(Australia) Craig Lowndes	**3rd**	161
2013	Triple Eight Race Engineering	Holden Commodore VF	(Australia) Craig Lowndes	**3rd**	161
2014	Holden Racing Team	Holden Commodore VF	(Australia) Garth Tander	DNS	0
2015	Holden Racing Team	Holden Commodore VF	(Australia) Garth Tander	**3rd**	161
2016	Holden Racing Team	Holden Commodore VF	(Australia) Garth Tander	DNF	150
2017	Walkinshaw Racing	Holden Commodore VF	(Australia) Scott Pye	**2nd**	161
2018	Walkinshaw Andretti United	Holden Commodore ZB	(Australia) Scott Pye	**2nd**	161
2019	Walkinshaw Andretti United	Holden Commodore ZB	(Australia) Scott Pye	7th	161
2020	Walkinshaw Andretti United	Holden Commodore ZB	(Australia) Chaz Mostert	**3rd**	161
2021	Walkinshaw Andretti United	Holden Commodore ZB	(Australia) Bryce Fullwood	5th	161
2022	Walkinshaw Andretti United	Holden Commodore ZB	(Australia) Nick Percat	22nd	148
2023	Charlie Schwerkolt Racing	Chevrolet Camaro Mk.6	(Australia) Scott Pye	17th	160
2024	Charlie Schwerkolt Racing	Chevrolet Camaro Mk.6	(Australia) David Reynolds	24th	159

* Super Touring race

=== Complete Bathurst 24 Hour results ===
Year	Team	Co-drivers	Car	Class	Laps	Pos.	Class pos.
2002	(Australia) Compuware	(Australia) Terry Bosnjak (Australia) Ian Palmer (Australia) Ray Sidebottom	Mitsubishi Magna	10	424	22nd	7th
2003	(Australia) Scott Loadsman	(Australia) Scott Loadsman (Australia) Ian Luff (Australia) David Russell	Holden Commodore VY SS	E	382	26th	**3rd**

=== Complete Bathurst 12 Hour results ===
Year	Team	Co-drivers	Car	Class	Laps	Pos.	Class pos.
2008	(Australia) The Car Stockade/Blue Oval Garage	(Australia) David Heath (Australia) Ian Luff	Ford BF Falcon XR8	D	193	23rd	**3rd**
2010	(Australia) West Surfing Products	(Australia) Glyn Crimp (Australia) Stuart Kostera	Mitsubishi Lancer RS Evo X	A	106	DNF	DNF
2011	(Germany) Audi Race Experience Team Joest	(Australia) Mark Eddy (Australia) Craig Lowndes	Audi R8 LMS GT3	A	292	**2nd**	**2nd**
2012	(Germany) Phoenix Racing	(Australia) Mark Eddy (Australia) Craig Lowndes	Audi R8 LMS GT3	A	156	DNF	DNF
2013	(Australia) Rod Salmon Racing	(Australia) Rod Salmon (Australia) Craig Lowndes	Audi R8 LMS	A	162	DNF	DNF
2014	(Australia) Rod Salmon Racing	(Australia) Rod Salmon (Australia) Jason Bright (Australia) Liam Talbot	Audi R8 LMS Ultra	A	0	DNS	DNS
2015	(Australia) Jamec Pem Racing	(Australia) Greg Crick (United Kingdom) Alessandro Latif	Audi R8 LMS Ultra	AA	0	13th	5th
2016	(Australia) Objective Racing	(Australia) Matt Campbell (Australia) Tim Slade (Australia) Tony Walls	McLaren 650S GT3	AA	49	DNF	DNF
2017	(Australia) Objective Racing	(Australia) Alex Davison (Australia) Tim Slade (Australia) Tony Walls	McLaren 650S GT3	APA	268	20th	6th
2018	(Australia) Objective Racing (New Zealand) McElrea Racing	(Australia) Jaxon Evans (Australia) Tim Slade (Australia) Tony Walls	McLaren 650S GT3	APA	260	DNF	DNF
2019	(Australia) Objective Racing	(United Kingdom) Andrew Watson (Australia) Tony Walls	McLaren 650S GT3	APA	268	23rd	6th
2020	(Australia) GJ Motorsport	(Australia) Bayley Hall (Australia) Brad Schumacher (Australia) Geoff Taunton	MARC II V8	I	167	NC	NC

Sporting positions
Preceded by None	Winner of the Pirtek Enduro Cup; 2013 (with Craig Lowndes)	Succeeded by Jamie Whincup; Paul Dumbrell
Preceded by Jamie Whincup; Paul Dumbrell	Winner of the Pirtek Enduro Cup; 2015 (with Garth Tander)	Succeeded by Shane van Gisbergen; Alexandre Prémat
