= 2004 PlaceMakers V8 International =

2004 Supercar Championship event

(New Zealand) 2004 PlaceMakers V8 International
Event Information
- Round 3 of 13 in the 2004 V8 Supercar Championship Series
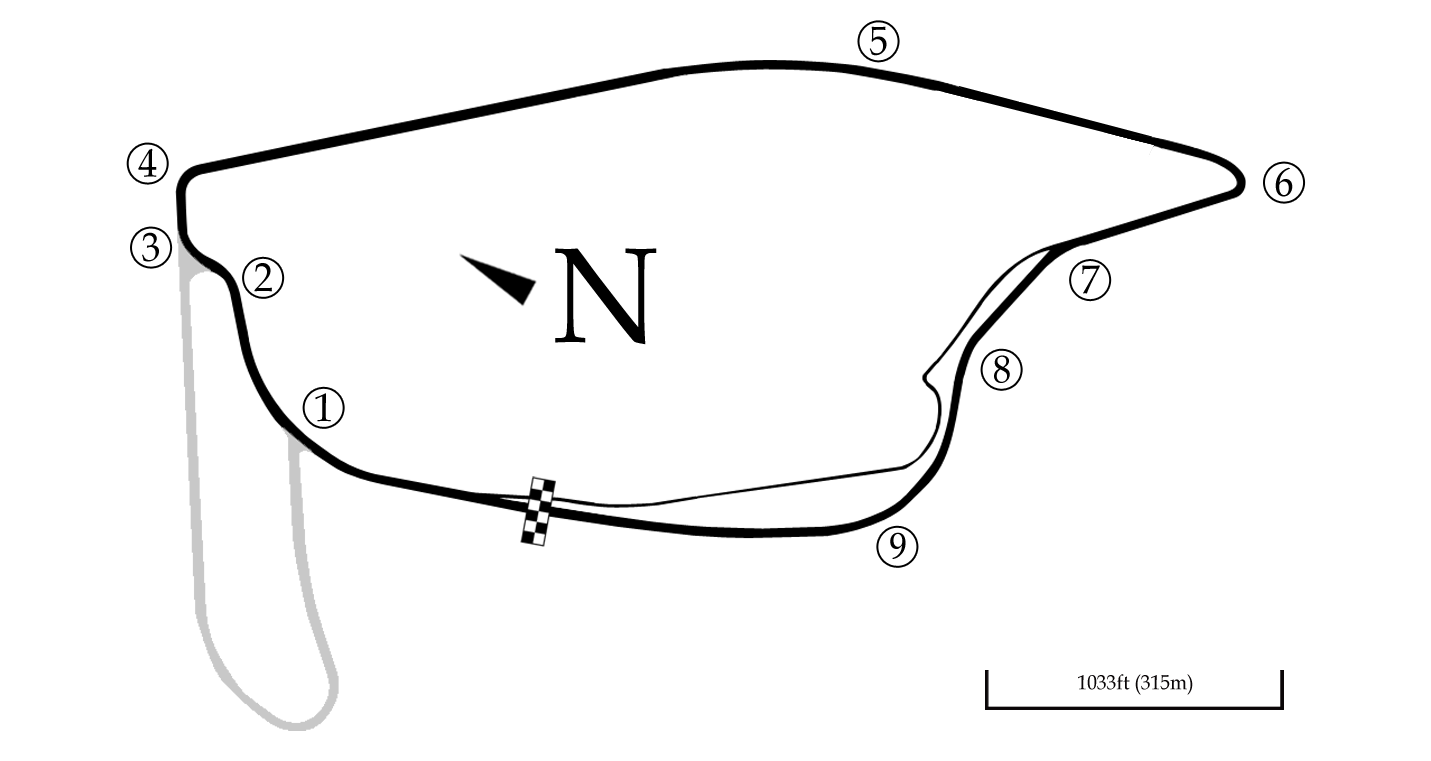
- Date: 2–4 April 2004
- Location: Pukekohe, New Zealand
- Venue: Pukekohe Park Raceway
- Weather: Friday: Overcast/Sunny; Saturday: Heavy rain Sunday: Overcast

Results
Race 1
Distance	36 laps	100 km
Pole position	Mark Skaife; Holden Racing Team	1:04.7477
Winner	Marcos Ambrose; Stone Brothers Racing	36:51.8458
Race 2
Distance	36 laps	100 km
Winner	Jason Bright; Paul Weel Racing	37:05.4230
Race 3
Distance	36 laps	100 km
Winner	Jason Bright; Paul Weel Racing	34:59.8159
Round Results
First	Jason Bright; Paul Weel Racing	190 pts
Second	Marcos Ambrose; Stone Brothers Racing	184 pts
Third	Greg Murphy; John Kelly Racing	182 pts

The 2004 PlaceMakers V8 International was a motor race for V8 Supercars held on the weekend of 2–4 April 2004. The event was held at the Pukekohe Park Raceway in Pukekohe, New Zealand, and consisted of three races culminating in 300 kilometers. It was the third round of thirteen in the 2004 V8 Supercar Championship Series and the only international event on the calendar.

After three years of the event running, Jason Bright ended Greg Murphy's dominance by taking two out of three race wins and the overall round win. The Kiwi wound up finishing in third place overall, behind defending series champion, Marcos Ambrose.

== Background ==
Murphy, as ever, was the favourite heading into the round. At this stage, Murphy had been undefeated at Pukekohe Park Raceway, in terms of overall round victories. Local media lapped Murphy up the entire week preceding the event with the Kiwi conducting hundreds of interviews, including one instance of 19 individual media interviews within an hour.

From 2001 to 2003, the Pukekohe event was held in early November, at the tail end of the championship. For 2004 onwards, the event was moved forward to early April.

== Race report ==
=== Qualifying ===
Bright claimed provisional pole position ahead of the top-ten shootout with a time three-tenths faster than nearest competitor and championship leader, Ambrose. The Holden Racing Team pair of Mark Skaife and Todd Kelly lamented their relative lack of engine power compared to Bright. The former HRT driver brushed off these comments, suggesting that, "...they are not as bad as they are making out, they just don't have the power advantage they want or have had in the past,". Murphy clamoured into the shootout too, although like his TWR counterparts, suggested that his car didn't have the pace to properly compete with Bright.

Pos.	No.	Driver	Team	Vehicle	Time
1	50	(Australia) Jason Bright	Paul Weel Racing	Holden Commodore (VY)	0:56.3655
2	1	(Australia) Marcos Ambrose	Stone Brothers Racing	Ford Falcon (BA)	0:56.6062
3	2	(Australia) Mark Skaife	Holden Racing Team	Holden Commodore (VY)	0:56.6209
4	22	(Australia) Todd Kelly	Holden Racing Team	Holden Commodore (VY)	0:56.7160
5	51	(New Zealand) Greg Murphy	John Kelly Racing	Holden Commodore (VY)	0:56.7184
6	11	(New Zealand) Steven Richards	Perkins Engineering	Holden Commodore (VY)	0:56.8207
7	888	(Brazil) Max Wilson	Triple Eight Race Engineering	Ford Falcon (BA)	0:56.8786
8	88	(New Zealand) Paul Radisich	Triple Eight Race Engineering	Ford Falcon (BA)	0:56.9058
9	12	(Australia) John Bowe	Brad Jones Racing	Ford Falcon (BA)	0:56.9423
10	10	(Australia) Jason Bargwanna	Larkham Motorsport	Ford Falcon (BA)	0:56.9425
11	9	(Australia) Russell Ingall	Stone Brothers Racing	Ford Falcon (BA)	0:56.9526
12	17	(Australia) Steven Johnson	Dick Johnson Racing	Ford Falcon (BA)	0:56.9529
13	15	(Australia) Rick Kelly	John Kelly Racing	Holden Commodore (VY)	0:57.0208
14	16	(Australia) Paul Weel	Paul Weel Racing	Holden Commodore (VY)	0:57.0298
15	5	(Australia) Glenn Seton	Ford Performance Racing	Ford Falcon (BA)	0:57.0829
16	3	(New Zealand) Jason Richards	Tasman Motorsport	Holden Commodore (VX)	0:57.0904
17	29	(Australia) Paul Morris	Paul Morris Motorsport	Holden Commodore (VY)	0:57.2545
18	18	(Australia) Warren Luff	Dick Johnson Racing	Ford Falcon (BA)	0:57.2793
19	44	(New Zealand) Simon Wills	Team Dynamik	Holden Commodore (VY)	0:57.4051
20	34	(Australia) Garth Tander	Garry Rogers Motorsport	Holden Commodore (VY)	0:57.4657
21	6	(Australia) Craig Lowndes	Ford Performance Racing	Ford Falcon (BA)	0:57.4761
22	21	(Australia) Brad Jones	Brad Jones Racing	Ford Falcon (BA)	0:57.4974
23	20	(Australia) Mark Winterbottom	Larkham Motorsport	Ford Falcon (BA)	0:57.5168
24	33	(Australia) Cameron McConville	Garry Rogers Motorsport	Holden Commodore (VY)	0:57.5283
25	8	(Australia) Paul Dumbrell	Perkins Engineering	Holden Commodore (VY)	0:57.5393
26	23	(Australia) David Besnard	WPS Racing	Ford Falcon (BA)	0:57.5584
27	31	(Australia) Steven Ellery	Steven Ellery Racing	Ford Falcon (BA)	0:57.5756
28	75	(Australia) Anthony Tratt	Paul Little Racing	Holden Commodore (VY)	0:57.6387
29	021	(New Zealand) Craig Baird	Team Kiwi Racing	Holden Commodore (VY)	0:57.7102
30	14	(New Zealand) Mark Porter	MSport	Holden Commodore (VX)	0:57.8811
31	7	(Australia) Tony Longhurst	Rod Nash Racing	Holden Commodore (VX)	0:57.9201
32	45	(Australia) Dale Brede	Team Dynamik	Holden Commodore (VY)	0:58.0219

=== Top Ten Shootout ===
The shootout was held in treacherous conditions. Cars were aquaplaning all over the track, thus Bargwanna kicked off proceedings with a somewhat conservative lap. Murphy was the first to lay down a notable improvement; going 1.3 seconds faster than previous fastest, Steven Richards. Eventually, as the grip improved ever so slightly, Skaife and Ambrose able lay down faster times. Skaife's pole position was hoped to be a return to form after a torrid first two rounds of the championship for the five-time champion.

Pos.	No.	Driver	Team	Vehicle	Time
1	2	(Australia) Mark Skaife	Holden Racing Team	Holden Commodore (VY)	1:04.7477
2	4	(Australia) Marcos Ambrose	Stone Brothers Racing	Ford Falcon (BA)	1:04.7517
3	51	(New Zealand) Greg Murphy	John Kelly Racing	Holden Commodore (VY)	1:05.2608
4	50	(Australia) Jason Bright	Paul Weel Racing	Holden Commodore (VY)	1:05.7407
5	11	(New Zealand) Steven Richards	Perkins Engineering	Holden Commodore (VY)	1:06.5466
6	88	(New Zealand) Paul Radisich	Triple Eight Race Engineering	Ford Falcon (BA)	1:06.5501
7	12	(Australia) John Bowe	Brad Jones Racing	Ford Falcon (BA)	1:06.5503
8	888	(Brazil) Max Wilson	Triple Eight Race Engineering	Ford Falcon (BA)	1:06.5796
9	22	(Australia) Todd Kelly	Holden Racing Team	Holden Commodore (VY)	1:06.7589
10	10	(Australia) Jason Bargwanna	Larkham Motorsport	Ford Falcon (BA)	1:07.6230

=== Race 1 ===
Controversy arose as the officials decided that, due to flooding of the track, the first race of the weekend would be postponed to Sunday instead of its originally scheduled Saturday afternoon slot. It was also suggested that cars be moved to higher ground as water levels were rising to dangerous levels. Overnight, water levels rose around the pitlane area. Some team members stayed in the paddock through the night in case the water levels started to pose a threat to the teams cars and equipment. Despite the obvious disappointment for the attending crowd, drivers and officials generally agreed that the decision to postpone the race was the right one.

Come Sunday, the race would start at 10:00am, with the conditions having markedly improved, albeit still damp. Mark Skaife threw away his front row start, adding to an array of poor starts that were starting to become an evident trend with him. Ambrose seized the advantage and took the lead with Jason Bright following in behind. The consertina effect at the hairpin resulted in Russell Ingall being tagged by John Bowe and sent into a spin. This scattered the pack, but remarkably, did not result in a crash of any sort. Tony Longhurst encountered his own problems after being forced off on the entry to the hairpin; having to use the tracks perimeter to avoid being stuck in the gravel trap.

The track began to gradually dry up and team began to experiment with tyres. Craig Baird and Paul Dumbrell were the first drivers to pit for slick tyres. Soon enough, they began to surge through the field, with Baird eventually working up to ninth place after starting in 29th. Skaife's nightmare run continued after being spun by Steven Richards at the hairpin. Richards also sustained damage to the rear of his car after being clipped by Max Wilson. Skaife subsequently retreated to the pits to gamble on the slick tyres. Garth Tander attempted a move of his own on Paul Morris at the same part of the circuit. These efforts resulted in a spin after he locked his rear tyres. Dumbrell's efforts on the slick tyres were curtailed after straying offline, t-boning Jason Bargwanna and putting them both into a spin at turn two.

Ambrose remained untroubled to the flag, taking the first win on New Zealand soil for the Ford brand. Bright was eight seconds behind in second place, and a further ten seconds behind him was the highest-placed Kiwi driver, Paul Radisich.

Pos	No	Name	Team	Laps	Time / difference	Grid
1	1	(Australia) Marcos Ambrose	Stone Brothers Racing	36	36min 51.8458sec	2
2	50	(Australia) Jason Bright	Paul Weel Racing	36	+ 8.245	4
3	88	(New Zealand) Paul Radisich	Triple Eight Race Engineering	36	+ 18.106	6
4	51	(New Zealand) Greg Murphy	John Kelly Racing	36	+ 18.588	3
5	888	(Brazil) Max Wilson	Triple Eight Race Engineering	36	+ 21.745	8
6	11	(New Zealand) Steven Richards	Perkins Engineering	36	+ 26.116	5
7	15	(Australia) Rick Kelly	John Kelly Racing	36	+ 27.876	13
8	6	(Australia) Craig Lowndes	Ford Performance Racing	36	+ 37.315	21
9	021	(New Zealand) Craig Baird	Team Kiwi Racing	36	+ 39.505	29
10	12	(Australia) John Bowe	Brad Jones Racing	36	+ 40.458	7
11	16	(Australia) Paul Weel	Paul Weel Racing	36	+ 40.632	14
12	9	(Australia) Russell Ingall	Stone Brothers Racing	36	+ 41.276	11
13	17	(Australia) Steven Johnson	Dick Johnson Racing	36	+ 41.616	12
14	3	(New Zealand) Jason Richards	Tasman Motorsport	36	+ 49.855	16
15	44	(New Zealand) Simon Wills	Team Dynamik	36	+ 50.299	19
16	2	(Australia) Mark Skaife	Holden Racing Team	36	+ 53.189	1
17	22	(Australia) Todd Kelly	Holden Racing Team	36	+ 55.358	9
18	31	(Australia) Steven Ellery	Steven Ellery Racing	36	+ 57.396	27
19	33	(Australia) Cameron McConville	Garry Rogers Motorsport	36	+ 59.806	24
20	21	(Australia) Brad Jones	Brad Jones Racing	36	+ 1:00.441	22
21	29	(Australia) Paul Morris	Paul Morris Motorsport	36	+ 1:01.160	17
22	75	(Australia) Anthony Tratt	Paul Little Racing	35	+ 1 lap	28
23	23	(Australia) David Besnard	WPS Racing	35	+ 1 lap	26
24	18	(Australia) Warren Luff	Dick Johnson Racing	35	+ 1 lap	18
25	20	(Australia) Mark Winterbottom	Larkham Motorsport	35	+ 1 lap	23
26	7	(Australia) Tony Longhurst	Perkins Engineering	35	+ 1 lap	31
27	10	(Australia) Jason Bargwanna	Larkham Motorsport	35	+ 1 lap	10
28	34	(Australia) Garth Tander	Garry Rogers Motorsport	35	+ 1 lap	20
29	5	(Australia) Glenn Seton	Glenn Seton Racing	35	+ 1 lap	15
30	8	(Australia) Paul Dumbrell	Perkins Engineering	34	+ 2 laps	25
31	45	(Australia) Dale Brede	Team Dynamik	34	+ 2 laps	32
32	14	(New Zealand) Mark Porter	MSport	34	+ 2 laps	30
Fastest lap: Mark Skaife (Holden Racing Team), 58.3415 on lap 28

=== Race 2 ===
Ambrose struggled off the line and lost second place to Murphy on the approach to turn two. At the end of the first lap, Radisich strayed wide at the top of Ford Mountain, spun at the mid-point of the main straight, and narrowly missed being broadsided by multiple cars.

On lap 9, Skaife retired due to a bent steering arm that he sustained whilst racing Max Wilson, who also retreated to the pitlane with ignition coil issues. Warren Luff speared off into the gravel trap at turn three when attempting to avoid a spinning Mark Porter. At the same time, Brad Jones was spun at the hairpin by Steven Ellery. Just moments later, Glenn Seton spun at a perilous position on the approach to Ford Mountain whilst trying to avoid a commotion between the two Larkham Motorsport cars. Bargwanna retired due to rear suspension problems incurred while racing Morris. In all the melee, the safety car was deployed.

As the laps whittled down, Murphy began to reign Bright in. With six laps remaining, the gap was down to under a second. Lowndes was beset with leaking fluid from the engine bay but managed to keep circulating until the very end. Bright withstood the charge from Murphy to take victory, delivering on the pace shown in practice and qualifying. Ambrose finished third, eight seconds behind the pair.

Pos	No	Name	Team	Laps	Time / difference	Grid
1	50	(Australia) Jason Bright	Paul Weel Racing	36	37min 05.4230sec	2
2	51	(New Zealand) Greg Murphy	John Kelly Racing	36	+ 0.786	4
3	1	(Australia) Marcos Ambrose	Stone Brothers Racing	36	+ 8.375	1
4	15	(Australia) Rick Kelly	John Kelly Racing	36	+ 11.229	7
5	11	(New Zealand) Steven Richards	Perkins Engineering	36	+ 12.349	6
6	16	(Australia) Paul Weel	Paul Weel Racing	36	+ 12.904	11
7	9	(Australia) Russell Ingall	Stone Brothers Racing	36	+ 13.201	12
8	17	(Australia) Steven Johnson	Dick Johnson Racing	36	+ 19.571	13
9	3	(New Zealand) Jason Richards	Tasman Motorsport	36	+ 20.607	14
10	22	(Australia) Todd Kelly	Holden Racing Team	36	+ 22.128	17
11	34	(Australia) Garth Tander	Garry Rogers Motorsport	36	+ 26.779	28
12	44	(New Zealand) Simon Wills	Team Dynamik	36	+ 27.211	15
13	7	(Australia) Tony Longhurst	Perkins Engineering	36	+ 27.632	26
14	20	(Australia) Mark Winterbottom	Larkham Motorsport	36	+ 31.766	25
15	29	(Australia) Paul Morris	Paul Morris Motorsport	36	+ 32.860	21
16	88	(New Zealand) Paul Radisich	Triple Eight Race Engineering	36	+ 33.107	3
17	021	(New Zealand) Craig Baird	Team Kiwi Racing	36	+ 34.921	9
18	33	(Australia) Cameron McConville	Garry Rogers Motorsport	36	+ 35.788	19
19	75	(Australia) Anthony Tratt	Paul Little Racing	36	+ 35.871	22
20	21	(Australia) Brad Jones	Brad Jones Racing	36	+ 37.472	20
21	5	(Australia) Glenn Seton	Ford Performance Racing	36	+ 38.465	29
22	12	(Australia) John Bowe	Brad Jones Racing	36	+ 41.731	10
23	23	(Australia) David Besnard	WPS Racing	36	+ 42.164	23
24	8	(Australia) Paul Dumbrell	Perkins Engineering	36	+ 52.641	30
25	14	(Australia) Mark Porter	MSport	36	+ 55.305	32
26	31	(Australia) Steven Ellery	Steven Ellery Racing	35	+ 1 lap	18
27	18	(Australia) Warren Luff	Dick Johnson Racing	33	+ 3 laps	24
28	888	(Brazil) Max Wilson	Triple Eight Race Engineering	29	+ 7 laps	5
29	6	(Australia) Craig Lowndes	Ford Performance Racing	28	+ 8 laps	8
Ret	45	(Australia) Dale Brede	Team Dynamik	26	Mechanical	31
Ret	10	(Australia) Jason Bargwanna	Larkham Motorsport	17	Suspension	27
Ret	2	(Australia) Mark Skaife	Holden Racing Team	9	Steering arm	16
Fastest lap: Steven Richards (Perkins Engineering), 57.6358 on lap 3

=== Race 3 ===
Off the line, Murphy and Bright were evenly matched, with the latter retaining the lead entering the back straight. As the race settled down, Bright began to put some distance between himself and the rest of the field. Murphy meanwhile found himself under attack from Ambrose.

On lap eight, Ambrose pulled an aggressive move on Murphy at turn four to move up into second place. Mark Winterbottom was experiencing fuel surge problems, forcing him to switch to the reserve tank. Eventually, these problems became too much and was forced to retire from the race. The race was relatively stagnant, up until the final laps when Murphy began to reel Ambrose in again. On lap 32, Murphy made an audacious pass on Ambrose around the outside of turns six and seven. Dale Brede also spun in front of Bright at turn three, throwing mud and water on the racing line.

Nevertheless, Bright remained undeterred. Even a tyre failure on the part of Morris, who was sent into the wall at Ford Mountain heavily on the last corner of the last lap wouldn't prevent Bright from taking the chequered flag first, winning the overall round and being the first driver to defeat Murphy from round honours in the history of the Pukekohe event. Murphy finished second, Ambrose third, but in terms of round points, Ambrose would finish second and Murphy third.

Pos	No	Name	Team	Laps	Time / difference	Grid
1	50	(Australia) Jason Bright	Paul Weel Racing	36	34min 59.8159sec	1
2	51	(New Zealand) Greg Murphy	John Kelly Racing	36	+ 7.210	2
3	1	(Australia) Marcos Ambrose	Stone Brothers Racing	36	+ 7.809	3
4	11	(New Zealand) Steven Richards	Perkins Engineering	36	+ 8.402	5
5	15	(Australia) Rick Kelly	John Kelly Racing	36	+ 16.258	4
6	16	(Australia) Paul Weel	Paul Weel Racing	36	+ 17.608	6
7	9	(Australia) Russell Ingall	Stone Brothers Racing	36	+ 18.608	7
8	17	(Australia) Steven Johnson	Dick Johnson Racing	36	+ 25.005	8
9	3	(New Zealand) Jason Richards	Tasman Motorsport	36	+ 25.553	9
10	34	(Australia) Garth Tander	Garry Rogers Motorsport	36	+ 25.894	11
11	88	(New Zealand) Paul Radisich	Triple Eight Race Engineering	36	+ 25.970	16
12	12	(Australia) John Bowe	Brad Jones Racing	36	+ 28.264	22
13	7	(Australia) Tony Longhurst	Rod Nash Racing	36	+ 30.361	13
14	22	(Australia) Todd Kelly	Holden Racing Team	36	+ 30.731	10
15	44	(New Zealand) Simon Wills	Team Dynamik	36	+ 30.841	12
16	75	(Australia) Anthony Tratt	Paul Little Racing	36	+ 36.391	19
17	888	(Brazil) Max Wilson	Triple Eight Race Engineering	36	+ 36.709	28
18	21	(Australia) Brad Jones	Brad Jones Racing	36	+ 37.386	20
19	2	(Australia) Mark Skaife	Holden Racing Team	36	+ 37.394	32
20	021	(New Zealand) Craig Baird	Team Kiwi Racing	36	+ 47.485	17
21	10	(Australia) Jason Bargwanna	Larkham Motorsport	36	+ 47.765	31
22	5	(Australia) Glenn Seton	Ford Performance Racing	36	+ 48.568	21
23	18	(Australia) Warren Luff	Dick Johnson Racing	36	+ 49.257	27
24	31	(Australia) Steven Ellery	Steven Ellery Racing	36	+ 50.006	26
25	23	(Australia) David Besnard	WPS Racing	36	+ 50.954	23
26	33	(Australia) Cameron McConville	Garry Rogers Motorsport	36	+ 51.229	18
27	8	(Australia) Paul Dumbrell	Perkins Engineering	36	+ 52.450	24
28	14	(New Zealand) Mark Porter	MSport	36	+ 57.020	25
29	45	(Australia) Dale Brede	Team Dynamik	35	+ 1 lap	30
Ret	29	(Australia) Paul Morris	Paul Morris Motorsport	33	Accident	15
Ret	6	(Australia) Craig Lowndes	Ford Performance Racing	32	Retired	29
Ret	20	(Australia) Mark Winterbottom	Larkham Motorsport	14	Fuel pump	14
Fastest lap: Jason Bright (Paul Weel Racing), 57.5119 on lap 5

== Aftermath ==
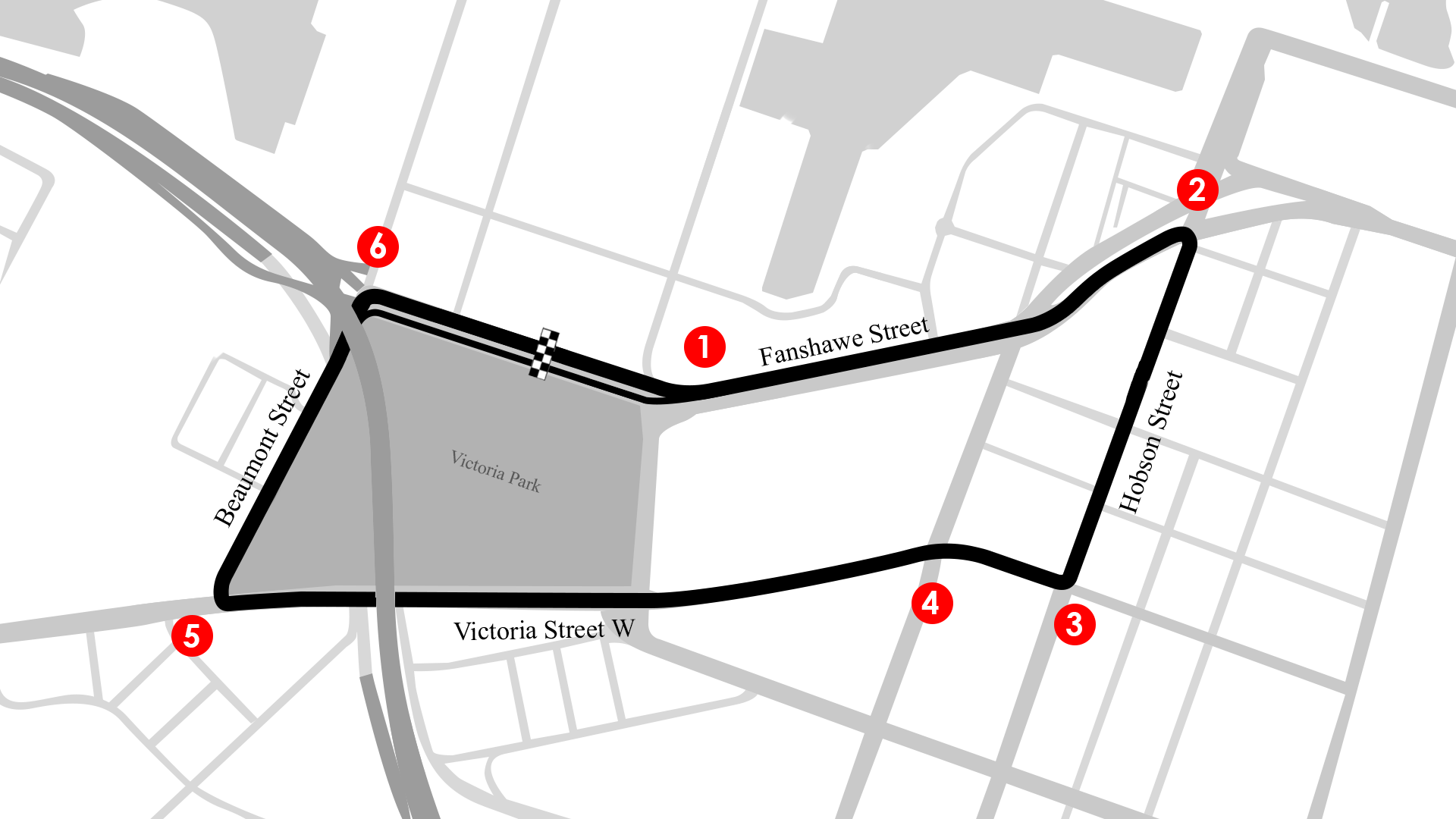
Provisional track map for the proposed Auckland V8 Supercar street race meant for 2006

While the popularity of V8 Supercars in New Zealand enticed officials to explore the possibility of a second championship round in the region, the status of Pukekohe's place on the calendar was up in the air. AVESCO were unsatisfied with the condition of the Pukekohe Park Raceway facilities and thus the search was on for a new home. Multiple venues had submitted proposals to take over the calendar slot from 2006 onwards. These included Wellington, Manfeild and a street race in Auckland. Manfeild's proposal was described by AVESCO chairman Tony Cochrane as being, "...equal of any we have seen in the history of AVESCO - that includes proposals from some of the world's largest and wealthiest cities".

Ultimately, the Auckland street race won proposal won out and the event was expected to replace Pukekohe from April 2006 onwards. An estimate 170,000 people were expected to attend the event which would've taken place right in the heart of Auckland's city centre. Soon after the announcement, safety concerns arose to the circuits configuration, the disruption to proceedings in the CBD and other costs associated with the event. And eventually, the project fell through, the promoter IMG having spent over a million dollars in establishing it. The event would return to Pukekohe for three more years before ceding the event to Hamilton in 2008.

=== Championship standings ===
Pos.	No	Driver	Team	Pts
1	1	(Australia) Marcos Ambrose	Stone Brothers Racing	532
2	11	(New Zealand) Steven Richards	Perkins Engineering	528
3	51	(New Zealand) Greg Murphy	John Kelly Racing	509
4	15	(Australia) Rick Kelly	John Kelly Racing	502
5	50	(Australia) Jason Bright	Paul Weel Racing	457
