= Australian Suzuki Swift Series =

- Category: Touring car racing
- Country: Australia
- Inaugural season: 1995
- Tyre suppliers: Achilles
- Drivers' champion: Gus Robbins
- Official website: web.archive.org/web/20151123030408/http://www.swiftseries.com.au/

The Australian Suzuki Swift Series is a touring car racing category in Australia. First held in 1995, the series only went for the one season when Suzuki importers Ateco pulled its support. The 2011 and 2012 series is part of the Shannons Nationals and is managed by Trans Tasman Motorsport. The series was inspired by the successful New Zealand and Dutch Championships.

== Series winners ==
Year	Driver	Car
1995	Adam Clarke	Suzuki Swift GTi
1996–2010 Not held
2011	Allan Jarvis	Suzuki Swift Sport RS
2012	Allan Jarvis	Suzuki Swift Sport RS
2013	Luke Fraser	Suzuki Swift Sport RS
2014	Gus Robbins	Suzuki Swift Sport RS
