= 2000 Shell Championship Series =

Motor racing competition

The 2000 Shell Championship Series was an Australian motor racing series open to V8 Supercars. The championship, which was the second Shell Championship Series, began on 11 February at the Phillip Island Grand Prix Circuit and ended on 19 November at the Mount Panorama Circuit after 13 rounds. Titles were awarded for drivers, teams and manufacturers by the series organisers AVESCO (Australian Vee Eight Supercar Company), and the winning driver was also awarded the Australian Touring Car Championship by the Confederation of Australian Motor Sport, the 41st time that this title had been awarded.

The Drivers Championship was won by Mark Skaife, the Champion Team of the Year title was awarded to the Holden Racing Team and Champion Manufacturer award went to Holden.

== Calendar ==
The 2000 Shell Championship Series was contested over 13 rounds.

Rd.	Event Circuit	City / State	Date	Map
1	Phillip Island Grand Prix Circuit	Phillip Island, Victoria	11–13 February	2000 Shell Championship Series is located in Australia
2	Barbagallo Raceway	Perth, Western Australia	17–19 March	2000 Shell Championship Series is located in Australia
3	Clipsal 500 Adelaide; Adelaide Street Circuit	Adelaide, South Australia	6–9 April	2000 Shell Championship Series is located in Australia
4	Eastern Creek Raceway	Sydney, New South Wales	28–30 April	2000 Shell Championship Series is located in Australia
5	Hidden Valley Raceway	Darwin, Northern Territory	19–21 May	2000 Shell Championship Series is located in Australia
6	GMC 400; Canberra Street Circuit	Canberra, Australian Capital Territory	9–11 June	2000 Shell Championship Series is located in Australia
7	Queensland Raceway	Ipswich, Queensland	30 June – 2 July	2000 Shell Championship Series is located in Australia
8	Winton Motor Raceway	Benalla, Victoria	14–16 July	2000 Shell Championship Series is located in Australia
9	Oran Park Raceway	Sydney, New South Wales	28–30 July	2000 Shell Championship Series is located in Australia
10	Calder Park Raceway	Melbourne, Victoria	18–20 August	2000 Shell Championship Series is located in Australia
11	OzEmail Queensland 500; Queensland Raceway	Ipswich, Queensland	8–10 September	2000 Shell Championship Series is located in Australia
12	Sandown International Raceway	Melbourne, Victoria	6–8 October	2000 Shell Championship Series is located in Australia
13	FAI 1000; Mount Panorama Circuit	Bathurst, New South Wales	16–19 November	2000 Shell Championship Series is located in Australia

== Teams and drivers ==
The following drivers and teams competed in the 2000 Shell Championship Series.

Permanent entries
Manufacturer	Vehicle	Team	No.	Driver	Events	Co-Driver	Events
Ford	Falcon EL	Paul Little Racing	75	(Australia) Anthony Tratt	1	—N/a	
Ford	Falcon EL	Power Racing	500	(Australia) Alan Heath	3–5	—N/a	
Ford	Falcon AU	Stone Brothers Racing	4	(New Zealand) Craig Baird	All	(New Zealand) Simon Wills	11, 13
Ford	Falcon AU	Stone Brothers Racing	9	(Australia) Tony Longhurst	All	(Australia) David Besnard	11, 13
Ford	Falcon AU	Glenn Seton Racing	5	(Australia) Glenn Seton	1–11, 13	(Australia) Neil Crompton	11, 13
Ford	Falcon AU	Glenn Seton Racing	6	(Australia) Neil Crompton	1–10, 12	—N/a	
Ford	Falcon AU	Glenn Seton Racing	6	(Australia) Neal Bates	11, 13	(Australia) Dean Canto	11
Ford	Falcon AU	Glenn Seton Racing	6	(Australia) Neal Bates	11, 13	(Australia) Wayne Gardner	13
Ford	Falcon AU	Larkham Motorsport	10	(Australia) Mark Larkham	All	(Australia) Geoff Brabham	11
Ford	Falcon AU	Larkham Motorsport	10	(Australia) Mark Larkham	All	(Switzerland) Alain Menu	13
Ford	Falcon AU	Dick Johnson Racing	17	(Australia) Steven Johnson	All	(Australia) Dick Johnson	11
Ford	Falcon AU	Dick Johnson Racing	17	(Australia) Steven Johnson	All	(Australia) Cameron McLean	13
Ford	Falcon AU	Dick Johnson Racing	18	(New Zealand) Paul Radisich	All	(Australia) Cameron McLean	11
Ford	Falcon AU	Dick Johnson Racing	18	(New Zealand) Paul Radisich	All	(Australia) Jason Bright	13
Ford	Falcon AU	Brad Jones Racing	21	(Australia) Brad Jones	All	(Australia) Tomas Mezera	11, 13
Ford	Falcon AU	Colourscan Racing	22	(Australia) Daniel Osborne	1	—N/a	
Ford	Falcon AU	Colourscan Racing	22	(Australia) Matthew Coleman	2–4	—N/a	
Ford	Falcon AU	Colourscan Racing	22	(Australia) Brett Peters	7	—N/a	
Ford	Falcon AU	Colourscan Racing	22	(Australia) Rick Bates	8–13	(Australia) Brett Peters	11, 13
Ford	Falcon AU	Steven Ellery Racing	31	(Australia) Steven Ellery	All	(Australia) Paul Stokell	11, 13
Ford	Falcon AU	Cameron McLean Racing	40	(Australia) Cameron McLean	1–10	—N/a	
Ford	Falcon AU	Paul Weel Racing	43	(Australia) Paul Weel	All	(Australia) Greg Crick	11, 13
Ford	Falcon AU	Paul Little Racing	75	(Australia) Anthony Tratt	2–13	(Australia) Alan Jones	11, 13
Ford	Falcon AU	Power Racing	500	(Australia) Alan Heath	7–8, 10, 13	(Australia) Terry Finnigan	13
Ford	Falcon AU	PAE Motorsport	600	(Australia) John Bowe	All	(Australia) Jim Richards	11, 13
Holden	Commodore VS	Lansvale Smash Repairs	3	(Australia) Trevor Ashby	All	(Australia) Steve Reed	11, 13
Holden	Commodore VS	Lansvale Smash Repairs	23	(Australia) Steve Reed	1–10, 12	—N/a	
Holden	Commodore VS	Lansvale Smash Repairs	23	(Australia) Geoff Full	11, 13	(Australia) Phillip Scifleet	11, 13
Holden	Commodore VS	Romano Racing	24	(Australia) Paul Romano	1–5, 7–13	(Australia) James Brock	11
Holden	Commodore VS	Romano Racing	24	(Australia) Paul Romano	1–5, 7–13	(Australia) David "Skippy" Parsons	13
Holden	Commodore VS	Paul Morris Motorsport	29	(Australia) Paul Morris	1–11	(United States) Kevin Schwantz	11
Holden	Commodore VS	Clive Wiseman Racing	50	(Australia) Mick Donaher	1–6, 10	—N/a	
Holden	Commodore VS	Clive Wiseman Racing	50	(Australia) Tyler Mecklem	8	—N/a	
Holden	Commodore VT	Holden Racing Team (TWR)	1	(Australia) Craig Lowndes	All	(Australia) Mark Skaife	11, 13
Holden	Commodore VT	Holden Racing Team (TWR)	2	(Australia) Mark Skaife	1–10, 12	—N/a	
Holden	Commodore VT	Holden Racing Team (TWR)	2	(Australia) Todd Kelly	11	(Australia) Nathan Pretty	11
Holden	Commodore VT	Holden Racing Team (TWR)	2	(United Kingdom) Jason Plato	13	(France) Yvan Muller	13
Holden	Commodore VT	Holden Young Lions (TWR)	15	(Australia) Todd Kelly	1, 3–4, 6, 8–10, 13	(Australia) Nathan Pretty	13
Holden	Commodore VT	Gibson Motorsport	7	(New Zealand) Steven Richards	All	(New Zealand) Greg Murphy	11, 13
Holden	Commodore VT	Gibson Motorsport	12	(New Zealand) Greg Murphy	1–10, 12	—N/a	
Holden	Commodore VT	Gibson Motorsport	12	(Australia) Darren Hossack	11, 13	(Australia) Terry Finnigan	11
Holden	Commodore VT	Gibson Motorsport	12	(Australia) Darren Hossack	11, 13	(Australia) David "Truckie" Parsons	13
Holden	Commodore VT	Bob Forbes Racing (GM)	13	(Australia) Rodney Forbes	1–7	—N/a	
Holden	Commodore VT	Bob Forbes Racing (GM)	28	(Australia) Rodney Forbes	8–13	(United Kingdom) John Cleland	11, 13
Holden	Commodore VT	Perkins Engineering	8	(Australia) Russell Ingall	1–10, 12	—N/a	
Holden	Commodore VT	Perkins Engineering	8	(Australia) Luke Youlden	11, 13	(Singapore) Christian Murchison	11, 13
Holden	Commodore VT	Perkins Engineering	11	(Australia) Larry Perkins	All	(Australia) Russell Ingall	11, 13
Holden	Commodore VT	Imrie Motorsport	14	(Australia) Greg Ritter	4	—N/a	
Holden	Commodore VT	Imrie Motorsport	14	(Australia) Mike Imrie	5, 7, 10, 12	—N/a	
Holden	Commodore VT	Imrie Motorsport	14	(Australia) Daniel Miller	11	(Australia) Anthony Robson	11
Holden	Commodore VT	Imrie Motorsport	14	(Australia) Rodney Crick	13	(Australia) Peter Gazzard	13
Holden	Commodore VT	McDougall Motorsport	16	(Australia) Dugal McDougall	All	(Australia) Andrew Miedecke	11, 13
Holden	Commodore VT	Doulman Automotive	26	(Australia) Peter Doulman	1–5, 9, 11, 13	(Australia) John Cotter	11, 13
Holden	Commodore VT	Doulman Automotive	26	(Australia) John Cotter	7–8	—N/a	
Holden	Commodore VT	Paul Morris Motorsport	29	(Australia) Paul Morris	12–13	(United Kingdom) Matt Neal	13
Holden	Commodore VT	Tomas Mezera Motorsport	32	(Australia) Tomas Mezera	1–4, 6–8, 12	—N/a	
Holden	Commodore VT	Garry Rogers Motorsport	34	(Australia) Garth Tander	All	(Australia) Jason Bargwanna	11, 13
Holden	Commodore VT	Garry Rogers Motorsport	35	(Australia) Jason Bargwanna	1–10, 12	—N/a	
Holden	Commodore VT	Garry Rogers Motorsport	35	(Australia) Greg Ritter	11, 13	(Australia) Tim Leahey	11, 13
Holden	Commodore VT	John Faulkner Racing	46	(New Zealand) John Faulkner	All	(Australia) Adam Macrow	11, 13
Holden	Commodore VT	Clive Wiseman Racing	50	(Australia) Mick Donaher	9, 11–13	(Australia) Tyler Mecklem	11, 13
Holden	Commodore VT	Rod Nash Racing	54	(Australia) Cameron McConville	1–10, 12–13	(Australia) Geoff Brabham	13
Holden	Commodore VT	Rod Nash Racing	55	(Australia) Rod Nash	8–13	(Australia) Cameron McConville	11
Holden	Commodore VT	Rod Nash Racing	55	(Australia) Rod Nash	8–13	(Australia) Paul Dumbrell	13
Part-time entries
Ford	Falcon EL	Emerzidis Motorsport	20	(Australia) Garry Holt	3, 11, 13	(Australia) Garry Willmington	11, 13
Ford	Falcon EL	Schembri Motorsport	36	(Australia) Neil Schembri	13	(Australia) Gary Quartly	13
Ford	Falcon EL	Sieders Racing Team	42	(Australia) Bill Sieders	13	(Australia) Luke Sieders	13
Ford	Falcon EL	Sieders Racing Team	56	(Australia) Robert Russell	13	(Australia) Steve Coulter	13
Ford	Falcon EL	Dean Canto Racing	45	(Australia) Dean Canto	3	—N/a	
Ford	Falcon EL	John Scotcher Motorsport	59	(Australia) Layton Crambrook	13	(Australia) Gary Baxter	13
Ford	Falcon EL	Halliday Motorsport	61	(Australia) Ross Halliday	11, 13	(Australia) Adam Wallis	11, 13
Ford	Falcon EL	Cadillac Productions	79	(Australia) Mike Conway	1	—N/a	
Ford	Falcon AU	Harris Racing	59	(Australia) Craig Harris	13	(Australia) Stephen Voight	13
Ford	Falcon AU	Dean Canto Racing	45	(Australia) Dean Canto	13	(Australia) Ian Moncrieff	13
Ford	Falcon AU	Rod Salmon Racing	87	(Australia) Rod Salmon	1, 11–13	(Australia) Damien White	11, 13
Holden	Commodore VS	Terry Wyhoon Racing	25	(Australia) Terry Wyhoon	13	(Australia) James Brock	13
Holden	Commodore VS	Alan Taylor Racing	37	(Australia) Bill Attard	13	(Australia) Roger Hurd	13
Holden	Commodore VS	South Pacific Motor Racing	38	(Australia) Peter Field	13	(Australia) Shane Howison	13
Holden	Commodore VS	Mal Rose Racing	44	(Australia) Mal Rose	13	(Australia) Christian D'Agostin	13
Holden	Commodore VS	Trevor Crittenden Motorsport	57	(New Zealand) Chris Butler	13	(New Zealand) Miles Pope	13
Holden	Commodore VS	Paul Morris Motorsport	67	(Australia) Owen Kelly	13	(Australia) Aaron McGill	13
Holden	Commodore VS	MW Motorsport	76	(Australia) Matthew White	11–13	(Australia) Terry Wyhoon	11
Holden	Commodore VS	MW Motorsport	76	(Australia) Matthew White	11–13	(Australia) Steve Owen	13
Holden	Commodore VS	V8 Racing	77	(Australia) Richard Mork	13	(Australia) Steve Williams	13
Holden	Commodore VS	John Faulkner Racing	96	(Australia) Ryan McLeod	13	(Australia) Wayne Wakefield	13
Holden	Commodore VS	Graphic Skills Racing	97	(Australia) Wayne Wakefield	3, 11	(Australia) Ryan McLeod	11
Holden	Commodore VS	Graphic Skills Racing	97	(Australia) Tim Sipp	13	(Australia) Shane Beikoff	13
Holden	Commodore VS	Clive Wiseman Racing	150	(Australia) Melinda Price	13	(Australia) Dean Lindstrom	13
Holden	Commodore VT	Challenge Motorsport	39	(Australia) Chris Smerdon	3–5, 8	—N/a	
Holden	Commodore VT	Challenge Motorsport	39	(Australia) Peter Gazzard	7	—N/a	
Holden	Commodore VT	James Rosenberg Racing	66	(Australia) Mark Poole	2–6	—N/a	
Holden	Commodore VT	Motorsport Engineering Services	99	(Australia) Derek van Zelm	11–12	(Australia) Christian D'Agostin	11
Holden	Commodore VT	Team Kiwi Racing	777	(New Zealand) Jason Richards	13	(New Zealand) Angus Fogg	13

=== Driver changes ===
- Rodney Forbes left Lansvale Racing Team to join Gibson Motorsport
- Jason Bright left Stone Brothers Racing to join Dick Johnson Racing as an endurance co-driver for the Bathurst 1000.
- Dick Johnson retired from full time driving and joined Steven Johnson for the Queensland 500.
- Steven Johnson replaced his father Dick Johnson who retired from full time driving.
- Brad Jones left Larkham Motorsport to join Brad Jones Racing.
- Wayne Gardner left Wayne Gardner Racing to join Glenn Seton Racing for the Bathurst 1000.
- Paul Morris left Holden Racing Team to join Paul Morris Motorsport.
- Cameron McConville left John Faulkner Racing to join Rod Nash Racing.
- Paul Dumbrell left John Faulkner Racing to join Rod Nash Racing for Bathurst.

=== Team changes ===
- Stone Brothers Racing expanded to a two car team.
- John Faulkner Racing scaled down to a one car team.
- Rod Nash Racing expanded to a two car team.

== Results and standings ==
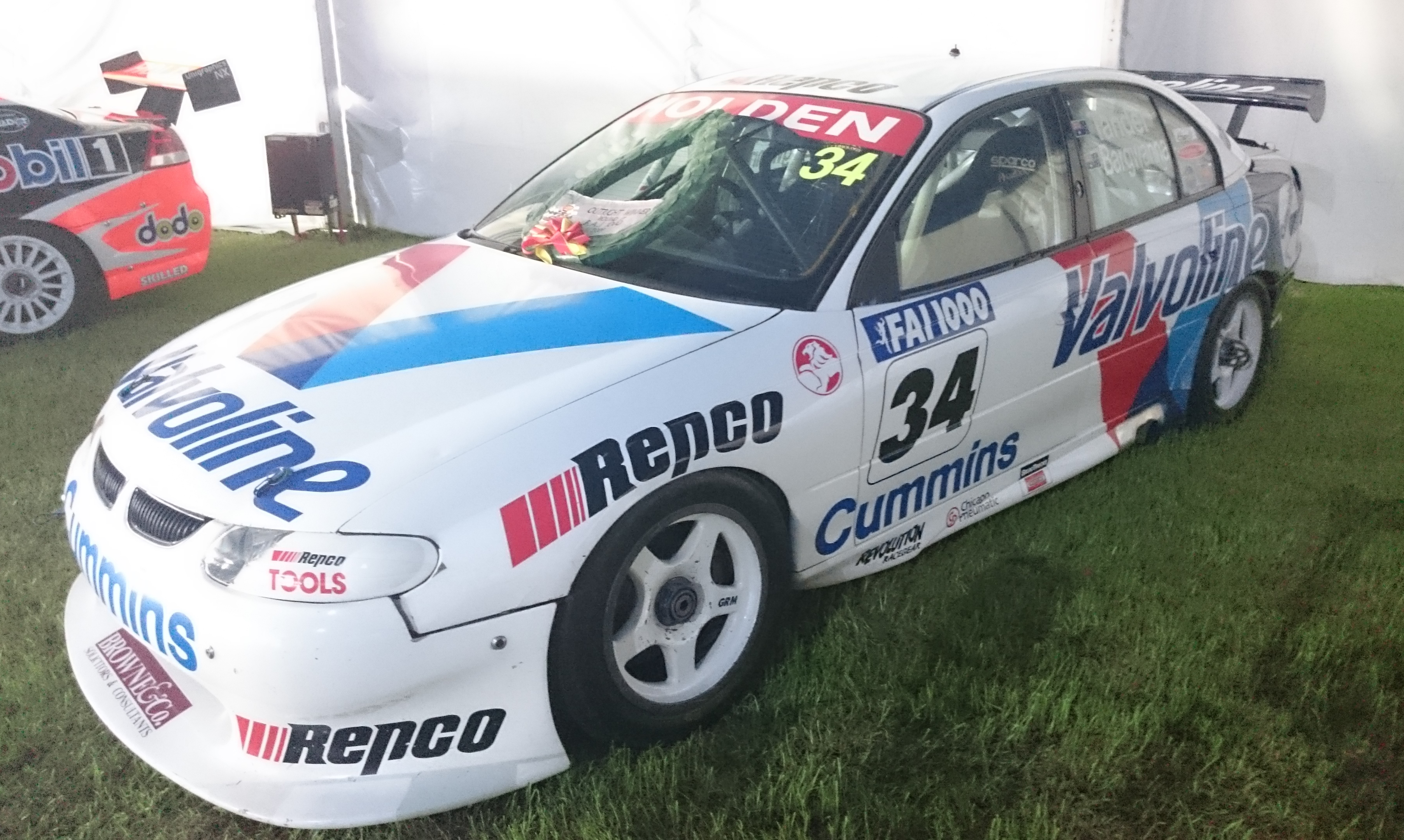
The Holden Commodore VT in which Garth Tander and Jason Bargwanna won the 2000 Bathurst 1000 (pictured in 2018).

=== Results summary ===
Round	Race	Event	Pole position	Race winners	Round winner	Report
1	R1	Phillip Island	(Australia) Craig Lowndes	(Australia) Craig Lowndes	(Australia) Garth Tander (Garry Rogers Motorsport, Holden)	
1	R2	Phillip Island		(New Zealand) Craig Baird	(Australia) Garth Tander (Garry Rogers Motorsport, Holden)	
2	R1	Perth	(Australia) Mark Skaife	(Australia) Craig Lowndes	(Australia) Craig Lowndes (Holden Racing Team, Holden)	
2	R2	Perth		(Australia) Craig Lowndes	(Australia) Craig Lowndes (Holden Racing Team, Holden)	
2	R3	Perth		(Australia) Craig Lowndes	(Australia) Craig Lowndes (Holden Racing Team, Holden)	
3	R1	Adelaide	(Australia) Garth Tander	(Australia) Craig Lowndes	(Australia) Garth Tander (Note: In 2000, the round winner at the Adelaide 500 was determined by combined event points – in all other editions of the Adelaide 500, the round win has been awarded to the winner of the Sunday race.) (Garry Rogers Motorsport, Holden)	report
3	R2	Adelaide		(Australia) Mark Skaife	(Australia) Garth Tander (Garry Rogers Motorsport, Holden)	report
4	R1	Eastern Creek	(Australia) Mark Skaife	(Australia) Mark Skaife	(Australia) Mark Skaife (Holden Racing Team, Holden)	
4	R2	Eastern Creek		(New Zealand) Paul Radisich	(Australia) Mark Skaife (Holden Racing Team, Holden)	
4	R3	Eastern Creek		(Australia) Russell Ingall	(Australia) Mark Skaife (Holden Racing Team, Holden)	
5	R1	Darwin	(Australia) Craig Lowndes	(Australia) Mark Skaife	(Australia) Mark Skaife (Holden Racing Team, Holden)	
5	R2	Darwin		(Australia) Mark Skaife	(Australia) Mark Skaife (Holden Racing Team, Holden)	
5	R3	Darwin		(Australia) Garth Tander	(Australia) Mark Skaife (Holden Racing Team, Holden)	
6	R1	Canberra	(Australia) Garth Tander	(New Zealand) Greg Murphy	(New Zealand) Steven Richards (Gibson Motorsport, Holden)	report
6	R2	Canberra		(Australia) Todd Kelly	(New Zealand) Steven Richards (Gibson Motorsport, Holden)	report
6	R3	Canberra		(Australia) Craig Lowndes	(New Zealand) Steven Richards (Gibson Motorsport, Holden)	report
7	R1	Ipswich 1	(Australia) Craig Lowndes	(Australia) Craig Lowndes	(Australia) Craig Lowndes (Holden Racing Team, Holden)	
7	R2	Ipswich 1		(Australia) Craig Lowndes	(Australia) Craig Lowndes (Holden Racing Team, Holden)	
7	R3	Ipswich 1		(Australia) Craig Lowndes	(Australia) Craig Lowndes (Holden Racing Team, Holden)	
8	R1	Winton	(Australia) Glenn Seton	(Australia) Garth Tander	(Australia) Jason Bargwanna (Garry Rogers Motorsport, Holden)	
8	R2	Winton		(Australia) Glenn Seton	(Australia) Jason Bargwanna (Garry Rogers Motorsport, Holden)	
8	R3	Winton		(Australia) Jason Bargwanna	(Australia) Jason Bargwanna (Garry Rogers Motorsport, Holden)	
9	R1	Oran Park	(Australia) Mark Skaife	(Australia) Mark Skaife	(Australia) Mark Skaife (Holden Racing Team, Holden)	
9	R2	Oran Park		(Australia) Russell Ingall	(Australia) Mark Skaife (Holden Racing Team, Holden)	
9	R3	Oran Park		(Australia) Mark Skaife	(Australia) Mark Skaife (Holden Racing Team, Holden)	
10	R1	Calder Park	(Australia) Craig Lowndes	(New Zealand) Paul Radisich	(New Zealand) Steven Richards (Gibson Motorsport, Holden)	
10	R2	Calder Park		(Australia) Mark Larkham	(New Zealand) Steven Richards (Gibson Motorsport, Holden)	
10	R3	Calder Park		(New Zealand) Steven Richards	(New Zealand) Steven Richards (Gibson Motorsport, Holden)	
11		Ipswich 2	(Australia) Garth Tander	(Australia) Craig Lowndes (Australia) Mark Skaife (Holden Racing Team, Holden)		report
12	R1	Sandown	(Australia) Craig Lowndes	(New Zealand) Paul Radisich	(New Zealand) Paul Radisich (Dick Johnson Racing, Ford)	
12	R2	Sandown		(Australia) Steven Ellery	(New Zealand) Paul Radisich (Dick Johnson Racing, Ford)	
12	R3	Sandown		(New Zealand) Paul Radisich	(New Zealand) Paul Radisich (Dick Johnson Racing, Ford)	
13		Bathurst	(Australia) Wayne Gardner	(Australia) Garth Tander (Australia) Jason Bargwanna (Garry Rogers Motorsport, Holden)		report

=== Points system ===
Championship points were awarded on the following basis:

Points format	Position																			
Points format	1st	2nd	3rd	4th	5th	6th	7th	8th	9th	10th	11th	12th	13th	14th	15th	16th	17th	18th	19th	20th
Point system 1	30	28	27	26	25	24	23	22	21	20	19	18	17	16	15	14	13	12	11	10
Point system 2	40	36	34	32	30	28	26	24	22	20	18	16	14	12	10	8	6	4	2	1
Point system 3	45	41	39	37	35	33	31	29	27	25	23	21	19	17	15	13	11	9	7	5
Point system 4	60	54	51	48	45	42	39	36	33	30	27	24	21	18	15	12	9	6	3	1
Point system 5	80	72	68	64	60	56	48	44	40	36	32	28	24	20	16	14	12	8	4	2
Point system 6	120	108	102	96	90	84	78	72	66	60	54	48	42	36	30	24	18	12	6	3
Point system 7	160	144	136	128	120	112	104	96	88	80	72	64	56	48	40	32	24	16	8	4
Point system 8	240	216	204	192	180	168	156	144	132	120	108	96	84	72	60	48	36	24	12	6

- Point system 1: Used for Oran Park, Calder Park and Sandown, race 2.
- Point system 2: Used for Barbagallo, Eastern Creek, Hidden Valley, Queensland (first visit) and Winton.
- Point system 3: Used for Oran Park, Calder Park and Sandown, races 1 and 3.
- Point system 4: Used for Phillip Island and Canberra races 1 and 2.
- Point system 5: Used for Adelaide race 1.
- Point system 6: Used for Canberra race 3.
- Point system 7: Used for Adelaide race 2 and the Queensland 500.
- Point system 8: Used for the Bathurst 1000.

=== Drivers Championship ===
Pos	Driver	No.	Penalty	Rd 1	Rd 2	Rd 3	Rd 4	Rd 5	Rd 6	Rd 7	Rd 8	Rd 9	Rd 10	Rd 11	Rd 12	Rd 13	Pts
1	Mark Skaife	2	0	102	106	160	112	116	168	108	46	117	101	160	106	168	1570
2	Garth Tander	34	0	108	102	212	54	108	0	92	80	106	101	144	86	240	1433
3	Craig Lowndes	1	15	60	120	80	74	36	171	120	68	68	96	160	104	168	1310
4	Paul Radisich	18	0	87	88	148	72	8	120	58	90	34	110	112	117	216	1260
5	Glenn Seton	5	0	90	18	176	92	100	162	76	84	101	46	104		84	1133
6	Greg Murphy	12	10	0	60	168	45	76	84	66	74	98	27	136	32	204	1108
7	Jason Bargwanna	35	0	0	56	188	12	10	75	44	102	67	61	144	55	240	1054
8	Steven Richards	7	0	57	22	88	56	0	189	34	21	42	110	136	34	204	993
9	Russell Ingall	8	0	0	98	112	102	48	72	80	50	63	46	128	46	108	953
10	Tony Longhurst	9	10	36	66	124	80	56	75	66	36	84	80	96	77	Ret	866
11	Steven Johnson	17	0	36	68	152	10	46	99	60	56	39	31	Ret	42	192	831
12	Neil Crompton	6	0	48	0	64	72	48	171	24	60	40	41	104	73	84	829
13	Larry Perkins	11	20	46	24	72	18	34	129	54	Ret	64	66	128	29	108	752
14	Mark Larkham	10	0	75	82	56	19	96	36	94	24	21	100	Ret	91	24	718
15	Craig Baird	4	0	93	28	68	46	64	Ret	22	52	25	7	80	61	156	702
16	John Bowe	600	0	24	0	160	84	4	63	30	48	36	36	120	74	Ret	679
17	Todd Kelly	15	0	48		36	12		159		44	65	31	Ret		180	575
18	John Faulkner	46	0	48	18	88	20	78	27	Ret	0	73	17	64	27	Ret	460
19	Paul Morris	29	0	24	64	44	40	14	61	6	34	33	26	Ret	13	96	455
20	Cameron McLean	40	0	12	22	8	0	1	30	0	44	Ret	11	112		192	432
21	Steve Ellery	31	0	21	20	Ret	14	54	0	10	40	24	59	56	108	Ret	406
22	Paul Weel	43	0	39	44	0	14	8	51	38	18	28	27	Ret	64	72	403
23	Dugal McDougall	16	0	30	20	8	0	42	72	8	0	0	7	Ret	0	144	331
24	Brad Jones	21	0	18	8	Ret	54	50	87	12	0	57	0	Ret	11	Ret	297
25	Simon Wills	4	0											80		156	236
26	Jason Bright	18	0													216	216
27	Cameron McConville	54	0	6	1	24	24	Ret	18	10	14	5	35	40	24	Ret	201
28	Rodney Forbes	13/28	0	39	0	Ret	9	6	0	0	44	28	9	48	0	Ret	183
29	Nathan Pretty	2/15	0											Ret		180	180
30	Andrew Miedecke	16	0											Ret		144	144
31	David "Truckie" Parsons	12	0													132	132
31	Darren Hossack	12	0											Ret		132	132
33	Jim Richards	600	0											120		Ret	120
33	Yvan Muller	2	0													120	120
33	Jason Plato	2	0													120	120
36	Steve Reed	23	0	0	3	16	0	8	36	0	11	12	23	Ret	7	Ret	116
37	Trevor Ashby	3	0	0	0	20	0	14	48	11	0	14	0	Ret	0	Ret	107
38	Mark Poole	66	0		5	Ret	2	6	90								103
39	Rick Bates	22	0								0	0	0	16	24	60	100
40	David Besnard	9	0											96		Ret	96
40	Matt Neal	29	0													96	96
42	Greg Ritter	35	0				0							88		Ret	88
42	Tim Leahey	35	0											88		Ret	88
44	Brett Peters	22	0							5				16		60	81
45	Mick Donaher	50	0	0	0	6	12	1	Ret			11	5	0	42	Ret	77
46	Matthew White	76	0											72		0	72
46	Terry Wyhoon	25/76	0											72		Ret	72
46	Greg Crick	43	0											Ret		72	72
49	Adam Macrow	46	0											64		Ret	64
50	Paul Stokell	31	0											56		Ret	56
51	John Cleland	28	0											48		Ret	48
51	Jason Richards	777	0													48	48
51	Angus Fogg	777	0													48	48
54	Rod Nash	55	0								0	DNS	0	40	0	Ret	40
55	Rod Salmon	87	0	0										Ret		36	36
55	Damien White	87	0											Ret	Ret	36	36
55	Tomas Mezera	32	0	0	6	16	0		2	0	DNS			Ret	12	Ret	36
58	Geoff Full	23	0											32		Ret	32
58	Phillip Scifleet	23	0											32		Ret	32
60	Peter Doulman	26	0	0	DNS	4	0	Ret				0		24		Ret	28
61	John Cotter	26	0							0	0			24		Ret	24
61	Alain Menu	10	0													24	24
63	Anthony Tratt	75	0	0	0	0	Ret	12	1	1	8	0	0	Ret	0	Ret	22
64	Shane Beikoff	38	0													12	12
64	Tim Sipp	97	0													12	12
66	Garry Holt	20	0			Ret								8		Ret	8
66	Garry Willmington	20	0											8		Ret	8
68	Dean Lindstrom	150	0													6	6
68	Melinda Price	150	0													6	6
70	Chris Smerdon	39	0			0	0	4			0						4
70	Daniel Miller	14	0											4			4
70	Anthony Robson	14	0											4			4
73	Paul Romano	24	0	1	0	Ret	0	0		0	1	DNS	DNS	0	0	Ret	2
74	Alan Heath	500	0			0	0	1		0	0		0			DNS	1
–	Danny Osborne	22	0	0													0
–	Matthew Coleman	22	0		DNS	0											0
–	Wayne Wakefield	97	0			0								0		Ret	0
–	Dean Canto	45	0			0								Ret		Ret	0
–	Mike Imrie	14	0					0		Ret			0		Ret		0
–	Layton Crambrook	59	0													0	0
–	Gary Baxter	59	0													0	0
–	Neil Schembri	36	0													0	0
–	Gary Quartly	36	0													0	0
–	Steve Owen	76	0													0	0
–	Peter Field	38	0													0	0
–	Shane Howison	38	0													0	0
–	Mike Conway	79	0	Ret													0
–	Neal Bates	6	0											Ret		Ret	0
–	Geoff Brabham	10	0											Ret		Ret	0
–	Alan Jones	75	0											Ret		Ret	0
–	Dick Johnson	17	0											Ret			0
–	Christian Murchison	10	0											Ret		Ret	0
–	Terry Finnigan	12	0											Ret		DNS	0
–	David "Skippy" Parsons	24	0													Ret	0
–	Wayne Gardner	6	0													Ret	0
–	Craig Harris	30	0													Ret	0
Pos	Driver	No.	Penalty	Rd 1	Rd 2	Rd 3	Rd 4	Rd 5	Rd 6	Rd 7	Rd 8	Rd 9	Rd 10	Rd 11	Rd 12	Rd 13	Pts

Colour	Result
Gold	Winner
Silver	Second place
Bronze	Third place
Green	Points classification
Blue	Non-points classification
Blue	Non-classified finish (NC)
Purple	Retired, not classified (Ret)
Red	Did not qualify (DNQ)
Red	Did not pre-qualify (DNPQ)
Black	Disqualified (DSQ)
White	Did not start (DNS)
White	Withdrew (WD)
White	Race cancelled (C)
Blank	Did not practice (DNP)
Blank	Did not arrive (DNA)
Blank	Excluded (EX)

=== Champion Team of the Year ===
- Holden Racing Team

The title was awarded to the team of the winning driver in the championship.

=== Champion Manufacturer ===
- Holden

The title was presented to the manufacturer with the most number of round wins in the championship.

== See also ==
- 2000 Australian Touring Car season
- 2000 Konica V8 Lites Series
