= 2000 Canberra 400 =

Auto Race

(Australian Capital Territory) 2000 Canberra 400
Event Information
- Round 6 of 13 in the 2000 Shell Championship Series
- Date: 9–11 June 2000
- Location: Canberra, Australian Capital Territory
- Venue: Canberra Street Circuit
- Weather: Overcast

Results
Race 1
Distance	29 laps	100 km
Pole position	Garth Tander; Garry Rogers Motorsport	1:44.1103
Winner	Greg Murphy; Gibson Motorsport	01:00:13.3208
Race 2
Distance	25 laps	100 km
Winner	Todd Kelly; Holden Young Lions	45:44.3771
Race 3
Distance	53 laps	200 km
Winner	Craig Lowndes; Holden Racing Team	01:42:04.9373
Round Results
First	Steven Richards; Gibson Motorsport	189 pts
Second	Neil Crompton; Glenn Seton Racing	171 pts
Third	Craig Lowndes; Holden Racing Team	171 pts

The 2000 Canberra 400 (known for sponsorship reasons as the 2000 GMC 400) was the sixth round of the 2000 Shell Championship Series and the inaugural running of the Canberra 400 event. It was held on the weekend of 9 to 11 June on the Canberra Street Circuit in Canberra, Australian Capital Territory.

The tight, twisty nature of the brand-new street circuit invoked chaos throughout the weekend. The first race was won by Greg Murphy after starting 14th on the grid. Todd Kelly claimed his first V8 Supercar victory by winning the reverse grid race, and Craig Lowndes won the final race with Holden Racing Team teammate Mark Skaife following a close second in a formation finish. Despite not winning any races and only scoring one podium, Steven Richards' consistency netted him the overall round victory honours.

== Background ==
The event was held on the weekend of 9 to 10 June 2001. It was the first V8 Supercar event to be held on the streets of Canberra, and consisted of two 100 km races followed by a 200 km final which would reward double points. Pitstops were compulsory for all races. Race two would feature a reverse grid race.

After seeing the benefits drawn from the Adelaide 500 event, the ACT government saw fit to bring the V8 Supercar series to the nations capital. The governing body AVESCO offered Canberra a five-year opportunity to stage a round of the V8 Supercars. Initially called the National Capital 100, the race was to be run inside the Parliamentary Triangle which created some debate in the media about the appropriateness of the event for Canberra in general, and for the zone in particular. In 1999, the then Chief Minister of the Australian Capital Territory, Kate Carnell put forward the idea to the ACT Legislative Assembly based on the success of the Adelaide 500. The Assembly voted to stage the event, with the only opposition coming from the Greens Party who believed that the race would create both air and noise pollution.

The Assembly voted to appropriate A$4.5million in capital works and A$2.5million for recurrent expenditure over five years to operate the event. This included the creation and removal of the concrete barriers that lined the circuit. Canberra Tourism and Events Corporation (CTEC) were given the responsibility of delivering the GMC 400 on time and within budget.

=== Entry list ===
There were 32 drivers entered into the event. Four entrants (Alan Heath, Paul Romano, Mike Imrie and Peter Doulman) from the previous round in Darwin would not enter the event.

== Race report ==
=== Qualifying ===
Mark Larkham secured provisional pole position with a time three tenths clear of nearest competitor, Craig Lowndes. John Bowe initially qualified seventh but his time was disallowed after incurring a technical infringement and thus was required to start the first race from the rear of the grid.

Pos	No	Name	Team	Vehicle	Time
1	10	(Australia) Mark Larkham	Larkham Motorsport	Ford Falcon (AU)	1:44.0931
2	1	(Australia) Craig Lowndes	Holden Racing Team	Holden Commodore (VT)	1:44.4543
3	18	(New Zealand) Paul Radisich	Dick Johnson Racing	Ford Falcon (AU)	1:44.5822
4	9	(Australia) Tony Longhurst	Stone Brothers Racing	Ford Falcon (AU)	1:44.7630
5	2	(Australia) Mark Skaife	Holden Racing Team	Holden Commodore (VT)	1:44.7741
6	15	(Australia) Todd Kelly	Holden Young Lions	Holden Commodore (VT)	1:45.0015
7	40	(Australia) Cameron McLean	Greenfield Mowers Racing	Ford Falcon (AU)	1:45.1564
8	5	(Australia) Glenn Seton	Glenn Seton Racing	Ford Falcon (AU)	1:45.2054
9	34	(Australia) Garth Tander	Garry Rogers Motorsport	Holden Commodore (VT)	1:45.2467
10	31	(Australia) Steven Ellery	Steven Ellery Racing	Ford Falcon (AU)	1:45.3722
11	12	(New Zealand) Greg Murphy	Gibson Motorsport	Holden Commodore (VT)	1:45.4283
12	17	(Australia) Steven Johnson	Dick Johnson Racing	Ford Falcon (AU)	1:45.4875
13	7	(New Zealand) Steven Richards	Gibson Motorsport	Holden Commodore (VT)	1:45.6118
14	11	(Australia) Larry Perkins	Perkins Engineering	Holden Commodore (VT)	1:45.6209
15	54	(Australia) Cameron McConville	Rod Nash Racing	Holden Commodore (VT)	1:45.6314
16	35	(Australia) Jason Bargwanna	Garry Rogers Motorsport	Holden Commodore (VT)	1:45.6841
17	43	(Australia) Paul Weel	Paul Weel Racing	Ford Falcon (AU)	1:45.6959
18	8	(Australia) Russell Ingall	Perkins Engineering	Holden Commodore (VT)	1:45.7739
19	29	(Australia) Paul Morris	Paul Morris Motorsport	Holden Commodore (VS)	1:45.8324
20	6	(Australia) Neil Crompton	Glenn Seton Racing	Ford Falcon (AU)	1:45.9030
21	66	(Australia) Mark Poole	James Rosenberg Racing	Holden Commodore (VT)	1:46.1212
22	13	(Australia) Rodney Forbes	Bob Forbes Racing	Holden Commodore (VT)	1:46.2549
23	4	(New Zealand) Craig Baird	Stone Brothers Racing	Ford Falcon (AU)	1:46.6263
24	16	(Australia) Dugal McDougall	McDougall Motorsport	Holden Commodore (VT)	1:46.6850
25	21	(Australia) Brad Jones	Brad Jones Racing	Ford Falcon (AU)	1:46.8969
26	75	(Australia) Anthony Tratt	Paul Little Racing	Ford Falcon (AU)	1:47.1298
27	32	(Australia) Tomas Mezera	Tomas Mezera Motorsport	Holden Commodore (VT)	1:47.1754
28	23	(Australia) Steve Reed	Lansvale Racing Team	Holden Commodore (VT)	1:47.2046
29	50	(Australia) Mick Donaher	Dick Johnson Racing	Holden Commodore (VS)	1:48.1149
30	3	(Australia) Trevor Ashby	Lansvale Racing Team	Holden Commodore (VS)	1:51.3801
31	46	(New Zealand) John Faulkner	John Faulkner Racing	Holden Commodore (VT)	1:59.0575
EXC	600	(Australia) John Bowe	PAE Motorsport	Ford Falcon (AU)	1:45.0354

=== Top fifteen shootout ===
Pos	No	Name	Team	Vehicle	Time
1	34	(Australia) Garth Tander	Garry Rogers Motorsport	Holden Commodore (VT)	1:44.1103
2	5	(Australia) Glenn Seton	Glenn Seton Racing	Ford Falcon (AU)	1:44.6217
3	2	(Australia) Mark Skaife	Holden Racing Team	Holden Commodore (VT)	1:44.8469
4	10	(Australia) Mark Larkham	Larkham Motorsport	Ford Falcon (AU)	1:44.8694
5	1	(Australia) Craig Lowndes	Holden Racing Team	Holden Commodore (VT)	1:44.9137
6	11	(Australia) Larry Perkins	Perkins Engineering	Holden Commodore (VT)	1:44.9448
7	18	(New Zealand) Paul Radisich	Dick Johnson Racing	Ford Falcon (AU)	1:45.3292
8	31	(Australia) Steven Ellery	Steven Ellery Racing	Ford Falcon (AU)	1:45.5797
9	7	(New Zealand) Steven Richards	Gibson Motorsport	Holden Commodore (VT)	1:45.7574
10	17	(Australia) Steven Johnson	Dick Johnson Racing	Ford Falcon (AU)	1:45.7941
11	54	(Australia) Cameron McConville	Rod Nash Racing	Holden Commodore (VT)	1:46.0805
12	9	(Australia) Tony Longhurst	Stone Brothers Racing	Ford Falcon (AU)	1:46.1623
13	15	(Australia) Todd Kelly	Holden Young Lions	Holden Commodore (VT)	1:46.2347
14	12	(New Zealand) Greg Murphy	Gibson Motorsport	Holden Commodore (VT)	1:46.5243
15	40	(Australia) Cameron McLean	Greenfield Mowers Racing	Ford Falcon (AU)	1:54.4873

=== Race 1 ===
Pos	No	Driver	Team	Car	Laps	Time/Retired	Grid
1	12	(New Zealand) Greg Murphy	Gibson Motorsport	Holden Commodore (VT)	29	01:00:13.3208	14
2	35	(Australia) Jason Bargwanna	Garry Rogers Motorsport	Holden Commodore (VT)	29	+ 9.716	16
3	7	(New Zealand) Steven Richards	Gibson Motorsport	Holden Commodore (VT)	29	+ 9.907	9
4	8	(Australia) Russell Ingall	Perkins Engineering	Holden Commodore (VT)	29	+ 10.465	18
5	43	(Australia) Paul Weel	Paul Weel Racing	Ford Falcon (AU)	29	+ 30.583	17
6	16	(Australia) Dugal McDougall	McDougall Motorsport	Holden Commodore (VT)	29	+ 32.720	24
7	66	(Australia) Mark Poole	James Rosenberg Racing	Holden Commodore (VT)	29	+ 33.103	21
8	23	(Australia) Steve Reed	Lansvale Racing Team	Holden Commodore (VT)	29	+ 33.566	28
9	6	(Australia) Neil Crompton	Glenn Seton Racing	Ford Falcon (AU)	29	+ 33.909	20
10	3	(Australia) Trevor Ashby	Lansvale Racing Team	Holden Commodore (VT)	29	+ 36.085	30
11	46	(New Zealand) John Faulkner	John Faulkner Racing	Holden Commodore (VT)	29	+ 38.106	31
12	5	(Australia) Glenn Seton	Glenn Seton Racing	Ford Falcon (AU)	29	+ 38.409	2
13	1	(Australia) Craig Lowndes	Holden Racing Team	Holden Commodore (VT)	29	+ 38.734	5
14	2	(Australia) Mark Skaife	Holden Racing Team	Holden Commodore (VT)	29	+ 38.987	3
15	18	(New Zealand) Paul Radisich	Dick Johnson Racing	Ford Falcon (AU)	29	+ 39.464	7
16	11	(Australia) Larry Perkins	Perkins Engineering	Holden Commodore (VT)	29	+ 48.885	6
17	10	(Australia) Mark Larkham	Larkham Motorsport	Ford Falcon (AU)	29	+ 49.712	4
18	9	(Australia) Tony Longhurst	Stone Brothers Racing	Ford Falcon (AU)	29	+ 49.870	12
19	15	(Australia) Todd Kelly	Holden Young Lions	Holden Commodore (VT)	29	+ 52.632	13
20	29	(Australia) Paul Morris	Paul Morris Motorsport	Holden Commodore (VS)	29	+ 56.452	19
21	17	(Australia) Steven Johnson	Dick Johnson Racing	Ford Falcon (AU)	29	+ 56.513	10
22	31	(Australia) Steven Ellery	Steven Ellery Racing	Ford Falcon (AU)	29	+ 56.918	8
23	40	(Australia) Cameron McLean	Greenfield Mowers Racing	Ford Falcon (AU)	29	+ 1:04.453	15
24	13	(Australia) Rodney Forbes	Bob Forbes Racing	Holden Commodore (VT)	29	+ 1:35.782	22
25	34	(Australia) Garth Tander	Garry Rogers Motorsport	Holden Commodore (VT)	27	+ 2 laps	1
26	75	(Australia) Anthony Tratt	Paul Little Racing	Ford Falcon (AU)	23	+ 6 laps	26
27	21	(Australia) Brad Jones	Brad Jones Racing	Ford Falcon (AU)	22	+ 8 laps	25
Ret	50	(Australia) Mick Donaher	Clive Wiseman Racing	Holden Commodore (VS)	26	Retired	29
Ret	600	(Australia) John Bowe	PAE Motorsport	Ford Falcon (AU)	11	Retired	32
Ret	4	(New Zealand) Craig Baird	Stone Brothers Racing	Ford Falcon (AU)	10	Accident	23
Ret	54	(Australia) Cameron McConville	Rod Nash Racing	Holden Commodore (VT)	1	Retired	11
Ret	32	(Australia) Tomas Mezera	Tomas Mezera Motorsport	Holden Commodore (VT)	0	Retired	27
Fastest Lap: Craig Lowndes (Holden Racing Team) - 1:45.3569 on lap 18

=== Race 2 (Reverse grid) ===
Pos	No	Driver	Team	Car	Laps	Time/Retired	Grid
1	15	(Australia) Todd Kelly	Holden Young Lions	Holden Commodore (VT)	25	45:44.3771	9
2	6	(Australia) Neil Crompton	Glenn Seton Racing	Ford Falcon (AU)	25	+ 2.500	19
3	17	(Australia) Steven Johnson	Dick Johnson Racing	Ford Falcon (AU)	25	+ 11.178	7
4	7	(New Zealand) Steven Richards	Gibson Motorsport	Holden Commodore (VT)	25	+ 26.201	25
5	21	(Australia) Brad Jones	Brad Jones Racing	Ford Falcon (AU)	25	+ 29.218	1
6	2	(Australia) Mark Skaife	Holden Racing Team	Holden Commodore (VT)	25	+ 29.807	14
7	11	(Australia) Larry Perkins	Perkins Engineering	Holden Commodore (VT)	25	+ 31.346	12
8	5	(Australia) Glenn Seton	Glenn Seton Racing	Ford Falcon (AU)	25	+ 32.313	16
9	18	(New Zealand) Paul Radisich	Dick Johnson Racing	Ford Falcon (AU)	25	+ 34.247	13
10	1	(Australia) Craig Lowndes	Holden Racing Team	Holden Commodore (VT)	25	+ 36.727	15
11	10	(Australia) Mark Larkham	Larkham Motorsport	Ford Falcon (AU)	25	+ 38.577	11
12	12	(New Zealand) Greg Murphy	Gibson Motorsport	Holden Commodore (VT)	25	+ 40.094	27
13	35	(Australia) Jason Bargwanna	Garry Rogers Motorsport	Holden Commodore (VT)	25	+ 45.186	26
14	16	(Australia) Dugal McDougall	McDougall Motorsport	Holden Commodore (VT)	25	+ 55.700	22
15	66	(Australia) Mark Poole	James Rosenberg Racing	Holden Commodore (VT)	25	+ 57.067	21
16	3	(Australia) Trevor Ashby	Lansvale Racing Team	Holden Commodore (VT)	25	+ 1:02.423	18
17	600	(Australia) John Bowe	PAE Motorsport	Ford Falcon (AU)	25	+ 1:10.190	31
18	43	(Australia) Paul Weel	Paul Weel Racing	Ford Falcon (AU)	25	+ 1:23.626	23
19	9	(Australia) Tony Longhurst	Stone Brothers Racing	Ford Falcon (AU)	25	+ 1:34.201	10
20	75	(Australia) Anthony Tratt	Paul Little Racing	Ford Falcon (AU)	25	+ 1:53.436	2
21	34	(Australia) Garth Tander	Garry Rogers Motorsport	Holden Commodore (VT)	24	+ 1 lap	3
22	32	(Australia) Tomas Mezera	Tomas Mezera Motorsport	Holden Commodore (VT)	23	+ 2 laps	29
23	13	(Australia) Rodney Forbes	Bob Forbes Racing	Holden Commodore (VT)	24	+ 4 laps	4
Ret	8	(Australia) Russell Ingall	Perkins Engineering	Holden Commodore (VT)	18	Retired	24
Ret	29	(Australia) Paul Morris	Paul Morris Motorsport	Holden Commodore (VS)	16	Accident	8
Ret	40	(Australia) Cameron McLean	Greenfield Mowers Racing	Ford Falcon (AU)	14	Retired	5
Ret	46	(New Zealand) John Faulkner	John Faulkner Racing	Holden Commodore (VT)	13	Retired	17
Ret	31	(Australia) Steven Ellery	Steven Ellery Racing	Ford Falcon (AU)	12	Retired	6
Ret	54	(Australia) Cameron McConville	Rod Nash Racing	Holden Commodore (VT)	11	Retired	28
Ret	50	(Australia) Mick Donaher	Clive Wiseman Racing	Holden Commodore (VS)	2	Retired	30
Ret	23	(Australia) Steve Reed	Lansvale Racing Team	Holden Commodore (VT)	2	Retired	20
DNS	4	(New Zealand) Craig Baird	Stone Brothers Racing	Ford Falcon (AU)		Did not start	
Fastest Lap: Craig Lowndes (Holden Racing Team) - 1:45.3569 on lap 18

=== Race 3 ===
Pos	No	Driver	Team	Car	Laps	Time/Retired	Grid
1	1	(Australia) Craig Lowndes	Holden Racing Team	Holden Commodore (VT)	53	01:42:04.9373	10
2	2	(Australia) Mark Skaife	Holden Racing Team	Holden Commodore (VT)	53	+ 0.244	6
3	5	(Australia) Glenn Seton	Glenn Seton Racing	Ford Falcon (AU)	53	+ 12.370	5
4	15	(Australia) Todd Kelly	Holden Young Lions	Holden Commodore (VT)	53	+ 14.208	7
5	7	(New Zealand) Steven Richards	Gibson Motorsport	Holden Commodore (VT)	53	+ 23.634	1
6	6	(Australia) Neil Crompton	Glenn Seton Racing	Ford Falcon (AU)	53	+ 35.925	2
7	11	(Australia) Larry Perkins	Perkins Engineering	Holden Commodore (VT)	53	+ 38.787	11
8	18	(New Zealand) Paul Radisich	Dick Johnson Racing	Ford Falcon (AU)	53	+ 39.102	13
9	9	(Australia) Tony Longhurst	Stone Brothers Racing	Ford Falcon (AU)	53	+ 47.336	18
10	29	(Australia) Paul Morris	Paul Morris Motorsport	Holden Commodore (VS)	53	+ 57.224	26
11	600	(Australia) John Bowe	PAE Motorsport	Ford Falcon (AU)	53	+ 1:06.210	25
12	17	(Australia) Steven Johnson	Dick Johnson Racing	Ford Falcon (AU)	53	+ 1:06.425	14
13	21	(Australia) Brad Jones	Brad Jones Racing	Ford Falcon (AU)	53	+ 1:25.865	17
14	66	(Australia) Mark Poole	James Rosenberg Racing	Holden Commodore (VT)	53	+ 1:45.815	9
15	16	(Australia) Dugal McDougall	McDougall Motorsport	Holden Commodore (VT)	52	+ 1 lap	8
16	40	(Australia) Cameron McLean	Greenfield Mowers Racing	Ford Falcon (AU)	52	+ 1 lap	29
17	3	(Australia) Trevor Ashby	Lansvale Racing Team	Holden Commodore (VT)	52	+ 1 lap	15
18	32	(Australia) Tomas Mezera	Tomas Mezera Motorsport	Holden Commodore (VT)	52	+ 1 lap	28
19	8	(Australia) Russell Ingall	Perkins Engineering	Holden Commodore (VT)	52	+ 1 lap	22
20	54	(Australia) Cameron McConville	Rod Nash Racing	Holden Commodore (VT)	52	+ 1 lap	30
Ret	75	(Australia) Anthony Tratt	Paul Little Racing	Ford Falcon (AU)	46	Retired	20
Ret	12	(New Zealand) Greg Murphy	Gibson Motorsport	Holden Commodore (VT)	41	Retired	3
Ret	23	(Australia) Steve Reed	Lansvale Racing Team	Holden Commodore (VT)	37	Retired	23
Ret	13	(Australia) Rodney Forbes	Bob Forbes Racing	Holden Commodore (VT)	26	Retired	21
Ret	35	(Australia) Jason Bargwanna	Garry Rogers Motorsport	Holden Commodore (VT)	24	Retired	4
Ret	50	(Australia) Mick Donaher	Clive Wiseman Racing	Holden Commodore (VS)	22	Retired	31
Ret	43	(Australia) Paul Weel	Paul Weel Racing	Ford Falcon (AU)	18	Retired	12
Ret	34	(Australia) Garth Tander	Garry Rogers Motorsport	Holden Commodore (VT)	9	Retired	19
Ret	10	(Australia) Mark Larkham	Larkham Motorsport	Ford Falcon (AU)	5	Retired	16
Ret	31	(Australia) Steven Ellery	Steven Ellery Racing	Ford Falcon (AU)	4	Retired	27
DNS	46	(New Zealand) John Faulkner	John Faulkner Racing	Holden Commodore (VT)		Did not start	
DNS	4	(New Zealand) Craig Baird	Stone Brothers Racing	Ford Falcon (AU)		Did not start	
Fastest Lap: Craig Lowndes (Holden Racing Team) - 1:45.9930 on lap 26

== Championship standings ==
Round points tally

Pos.	No	Driver	Team	Pts
1	7	(New Zealand) Steven Richards	Gibson Motorsport	189
2	6	(Australia) Neil Crompton	Glenn Seton Racing	171
3	1	(Australia) Craig Lowndes	Holden Racing Team	171
4	2	(Australia) Mark Skaife	Holden Racing Team	168
5	5	(Australia) Glenn Seton	Glenn Seton Racing	162

Drivers' Championship standings after Round 5

Pos.	No	Driver	Team	Pts
1	2	(Australia) Mark Skaife	Holden Racing Team	764
2	5	(Australia) Glenn Seton	Glenn Seton Racing	638
3	34	(Australia) Garth Tander	Garry Rogers Motorsport	584
4	1	(Australia) Craig Lowndes	Holden Racing Team	526
5	18	(New Zealand) Paul Radisich	Dick Johnson Racing	523
