= 1996 Australian Touring Car season =

Seasons
- ← 1995 1997 →

The 1996 Australian Touring Car season was the 37th year of touring car racing in Australia since the first runnings of the Australian Touring Car Championship and the fore-runner of the present day Bathurst 1000, the Armstrong 500.

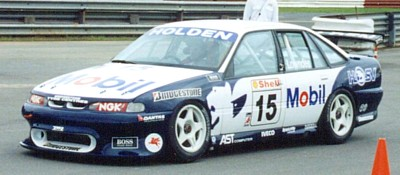
Holden VR Commodore of Craig Lowndes

Two major touring car categories raced in Australia during 1996, Group 3A Touring Cars and Super Touring. Between them there were 26 touring car race meetings held during 1996; a ten-round series for Group 3A Touring Cars, the 1996 Australian Touring Car Championship (ATCC); an eight-round series for Super Touring, the 1996 Australian Super Touring Championship (ASTC); a two event series in New Zealand, support programme events at the 1996 Australian Grand Prix and 1996 Bartercard Indycar Australia and two stand alone long distance races, nicknamed 'enduros'.

== Results and standings ==
=== Race calendar ===
The 1996 Australian touring car season consisted of 26 events.

Date	Series	Circuit	City / state	Winner	Team	Car	Report
27 Jan	ATCC Round 1	Eastern Creek Raceway	Sydney, New South Wales	Craig Lowndes	Holden Racing Team	Holden VR Commodore	
4 Feb	ATCC Round 2	Sandown International Raceway	Melbourne, Victoria	Craig Lowndes	Holden Racing Team	Holden VR Commodore	
25 Feb	ATCC Round 3	Mount Panorama Circuit	Bathurst, New South Wales	John Bowe	Dick Johnson Racing	Ford EF Falcon	
9–10 Mar	Super Touring Car Race	Albert Park street circuit	Melbourne, Victoria	Geoff Brabham	Paul Morris Motorsport	BMW 318i	
9–10 Mar	TAC Touring Cars	Albert Park street circuit	Melbourne, Victoria	Peter Brock	Holden Racing Team	Holden VR Commodore	
17 Mar	ATCC Round 4	Symmons Plains Raceway	Launceston, Tasmania	Craig Lowndes	Holden Racing Team	Holden VR Commodore	
30–31 Mar	Super Touring Cars	Surfers Paradise street circuit	Surfers Paradise, Queensland	Greg Murphy	Brad Jones Racing	Audi A4 Quattro	
30–31 Mar	EA Sports Touring Cars	Surfers Paradise street circuit	Surfers Paradise, Queensland	John Bowe	Dick Johnson Racing	Ford EF Falcon	
14 Apr	ATCC Round 5	Phillip Island Grand Prix Circuit	Phillip Island, Victoria	Larry Perkins	Perkins Engineering	Holden VR Commodore	
28 Apr	ATCC Round 6	Calder Park Raceway	Melbourne, Victoria	Russell Ingall	Perkins Engineering	Holden VR Commodore	
5 May	ATCC Round 7	Lakeside International Raceway	Brisbane, Queensland	Craig Lowndes	Holden Racing Team	Holden VR Commodore	
19 May	ASTC Round 1	Amaroo Park	Sydney, New South Wales	Brad Jones	Brad Jones Racing	Audi A4 Quattro	
26 May	ATCC Round 8	Barbagallo Raceway	Perth, Western Australia	Craig Lowndes	Holden Racing Team	Holden VR Commodore	
2 Jun	ATCC Round 9	Mallala Motor Sport Park	Adelaide, South Australia	Craig Lowndes	Holden Racing Team	Holden VR Commodore	
17 Jun	ATCC Round 10	Oran Park Raceway	Sydney, New South Wales	Peter Brock	Holden Racing Team	Holden VR Commodore	
23 Jun	ASTC Round 2	Lakeside International Raceway	Brisbane, Queensland	Paul Morris	Paul Morris Motorsport	BMW 318i	
14 Jul	ASTC Round 3	Amaroo Park	Sydney, New South Wales	Brad Jones	Brad Jones Racing	Audi A4 Quattro	
11 Aug	ASTC Round 4	Mallala Motor Sport Park	Adelaide, South Australia	Greg Murphy	Brad Jones Racing	Audi A4 Quattro	
25 Aug	ASTC Round 5	Winton Motor Raceway	Benalla, Victoria	Paul Morris	Paul Morris Motorsport	BMW 318i	
8 Sep	Tickford 500	Sandown International Raceway	Melbourne, Victoria	Craig Lowndes; Greg Murphy	Holden Racing Team	Holden VR Commodore	report
22 Sep	ASTC Round 6	Phillip Island Grand Prix Circuit	Phillip Island, Victoria	Greg Murphy	Brad Jones Racing	Audi A4 Quattro	
5–6 Oct	Super Touring	Mount Panorama Circuit	Bathurst, New South Wales	Jim Richards	Volvo Dealer Racing	Volvo 850	
5–6 Oct	AMP Bathurst 1000	Mount Panorama Circuit	Bathurst, New South Wales	Craig Lowndes; Greg Murphy	Holden Racing Team	Holden VR Commodore	report
27 Oct	ASTC Round 7	Lakeside International Raceway	Brisbane, Queensland	Paul Morris	Paul Morris Motorsport	BMW 318i	
9 Nov	ASTC Round 8	Oran Park Raceway	Sydney, New South Wales	Brad Jones	Brad Jones Racing	Audi A4 Quattro	
17 Nov	Pukekohe Mobil Sprints	Pukekohe Park Raceway	Pukekohe, New Zealand	Greg Murphy	Holden Racing Team	Holden VR Commodore	
24 Nov	Wellington Mobil Sprints	Wellington street circuit	Wellington, New Zealand	John Bowe	Dick Johnson Racing	Ford EF Falcon	

=== Formula 1 Super Touring support race ===
This meeting was a support event of the 1996 Australian Grand Prix.

Driver	No.	Team	Car	Race 1	Race 2
(Australia) Geoff Brabham	83	BMW Motorsport Australia	BMW 320i	1	1
(Australia) Paul Morris	1	BMW Motorsport Australia	BMW 320i	2	2
(New Zealand) Jim Richards	77	Ross Palmer Motorsport	Ford Mondeo	5	3
(Australia) Brad Jones	3	Brad Jones Racing	Audi A4 Quattro	4	4
(New Zealand) Greg Murphy	4	Brad Jones Racing	Audi A4 Quattro	3	5
(Australia) Peter Brock	05	Volvo Cars Australia	Volvo 850	6	6
(New Zealand) Steven Richards	34	Garry Rogers Motorsport	Alfa Romeo 155	8	7
(Australia) Mark Adderton	96	Phoenix Motorsport	Peugeot 405 Mi16	9	8
(Australia) Paul Nelson	15	Bob Holden Motors	BMW M3	DNF	9
(Australia) Justin Mathews	16	Bob Holden Motors	BMW 318i	11	10
(Australia) Cameron McLean	12	Greenfield Mowers Racing	BMW 318i	DNF	11
(Australia) Peter Hills	88	Knight Racing	Ford Sierra	13	12
(Australia) John Mann	31	Craig Lawless	Peugeot 405 Mi16	14	13
(Australia) Geoff Full	95	Phoenix Motorsport	Peugeot 405 Mi16	7	DNF
(Australia) Bob Holden	13	Bob Holden Motors	BMW M3	12	DNF
(Australia) Les May	20	Les May Racing	BMW M3	10	DNF

=== TAC Touring Cars ===
This meeting was a support event of the 1996 Australian Grand Prix.

Driver	No.	Team	Car	Race 1	Race 2
(Australia) Peter Brock	05	Holden Racing Team	Holden VR Commodore	2	1
(Australia) John Bowe	1	Dick Johnson Racing	Ford EF Falcon	3	2
(Australia) Glenn Seton	30	Glenn Seton Racing	Ford EF Falcon	1	3
(Australia) Russell Ingall	8	Perkins Engineering	Holden VR Commodore	7	4
(Australia) Mark Skaife	2	Gibson Motorsport	Holden VR Commodore	DNF	5
(New Zealand) Steven Richards	32	Garry Rogers Motorsport	Holden VR Commodore	13	6
(Australia) Wayne Gardner	4	Wayne Gardner Racing	Holden VR Commodore	DNF	7
(Australia) Steve Ellery	52	Steven Ellery Racing	Ford EF Falcon	11	8
(Australia) Neil Crompton	7	Wayne Gardner Racing	Holden VR Commodore	DNF	9
(Australia) Dick Johnson	17	Dick Johnson Racing	Ford EF Falcon	19	10
(Australia) Tony Longhurst	25	Longhurst Racing	Ford EF Falcon	10	11
(Australia) Terry Finnigan	27		Holden VP Commodore	22	12
(Australia) Alan Jones	301	Alan Jones Racing	Ford EF Falcon	5	13
(New Zealand) John Faulkner	46	John Faulkner Racing	Holden VR Commodore	8	14
(Australia) David Parsons	55	David Parsons	Holden VR Commodore	16	15
(Australia) Mark Poole	38	James Rosenberg Racing	Holden VR Commodore	24	16
(Australia) Trevor Ashby	3	Lansvale Racing Team	Holden VP Commodore	DNF	17
(Australia) Chris Smerdon	39	Challenge Motorsport	Holden VR Commodore	23	18
(Australia) Peter McLeod	50		Holden VR Commodore	25	19
(Australia) Malcolm Stenniken	14		Holden VR Commodore	21	20
(Australia) Bob Jones	43	Bob Jones Racing	Holden VP Commodore	20	21
(Australia) John Trimbole	47	Daily Planet Racing	Ford EB Falcon	18	22
(Australia) Larry Perkins	11	Perkins Engineering	Holden VR Commodore	6	23
(Australia) Craig Lowndes	15	Holden Racing Team	Holden VR Commodore	4	DNF
(Australia) Paul Romano	201	Alan Jones Racing	Ford EF Falcon	15	DNF
(Australia) Max Dumesny	75	John Sidney Racing	Ford EF Falcon	12	DNF
(Australia) Mark Larkham	10	Larkham Motor Sport	Ford EF Falcon	14	DNF
(Australia) Peter Doulman	29	M3 Motorsport	Holden VP Commodore	9	DNF
(Australia) Wayne Russell	62		Holden VP Commodore	DNF	DNF
(Australia) Kevin Heffernan	74	PACE Racing	Holden VP Commodore	17	DNF

=== Champ Car Super Touring support race ===
This meeting was a support event of the 1996 Bartercard Indycar Australia.

Driver	No.	Team	Car	Race 1	Race 2
(New Zealand) Greg Murphy	4	Brad Jones Racing	Audi A4 Quattro	2	1
(New Zealand) Jim Richards	77	Ross Palmer Motorsport	Ford Mondeo	5	2
(Australia) Charlie O'Brien	10	BMW International	BMW 318i	1	3
(Australia) Peter Brock	05	Volvo Cars Australia	Volvo 850	4	4
(Australia) Cameron McLean	12	Greenfield Mowers Racing	BMW 318i		5
(United States) Kevin Schwantz	97	Phoenix Motorsport	Peugeot 405 Mi16	3	6
(Australia) Geoff Full	95	Phoenix Motorsport	Peugeot 405 Mi16	7	7
(Australia) Stephen Voight	18		BMW M3		8
(Australia) Justin Mathews	16	Bob Holden Motors	BMW 318i	9	9
(Australia) Paul Pickett	58	Triple P Racing	Hyundai Lantra		10
(New Zealand) Miles Pope	36	BMW International	BMW 318i		11
(Australia) Kurt Kratzmann	33		Ford Sierra		12
(Australia) Bob Holden	13	Bob Holden Motors	BMW M3		13
(Australia) Paul Nelson	15	Bob Holden Motors	BMW M3		14
(New Zealand) Steven Richards	34	Garry Rogers Motorsport	Alfa Romeo 155	8	15
(Australia) Geoff Brabham	83	BMW Motorsport Australia	BMW 318i	DNF	DNF
(Australia) Paul Morris	1	BMW Motorsport Australia	BMW 318i	6	DNF
(Australia) Brad Jones	3	Brad Jones Racing	Audi A4 Quattro	DNF	DNS

=== EA Sports Touring Cars ===
This meeting was a support event of the 1996 Bartercard Indycar Australia.

Driver	No.	Team	Car	Race 1	Race 2
(Australia) John Bowe	1	Dick Johnson Racing	Ford EF Falcon	1	1
(Australia) Peter Brock	05	Holden Racing Team	Holden VR Commodore	2	2
(Australia) Russell Ingall	8	Perkins Engineering	Holden VR Commodore	8	3
(Australia) Alan Jones	301	Alan Jones Racing	Ford EF Falcon	4	4
(Australia) Dick Johnson	17	Dick Johnson Racing	Ford EF Falcon	3	5
(Australia) Mark Skaife	2	Gibson Motorsport	Holden VR Commodore	9	6
(Australia) Larry Perkins	11	Perkins Engineering	Holden VR Commodore	5	7
(Australia) Glenn Seton	30	Glenn Seton Racing	Ford EF Falcon	7	8
(Australia) Tony Longhurst	25	Longhurst Racing	Ford EF Falcon	10	9
(New Zealand) John Faulkner	46	John Faulkner Racing	Holden VR Commodore	13	10
(Australia) Steve Ellery	52	Steven Ellery Racing	Ford EF Falcon	14	11
(Australia) Brad Jones	4	Wayne Gardner Racing	Holden VR Commodore	12	12
(Australia) Mark Poole	38	James Rosenberg Racing	Holden VR Commodore	18	13
(Australia) Mal Rose	44	Mal Rose Racing	Holden VR Commodore	20	14
(Australia) Terry Finnigan	27		Holden VP Commodore	15	15
(Australia) Neil Crompton	7	Wayne Gardner Racing	Holden VR Commodore	DNF	16
(Australia) Paul Romano	201	Alan Jones Racing	Ford EF Falcon	DNS	17
(Australia) Max Dumesny	75	John Sidney Racing	Ford EF Falcon	16	18
(Australia) Steve Reed	3	Lansvale Racing Team	Holden VP Commodore	DNF	19
(Australia) Kevin Waldock	28	Playscape Racing	Ford EF Falcon	21	20
(New Zealand) Steven Richards	32	Garry Rogers Motorsport	Holden VR Commodore	11	21
(Australia) Wayne Russell	62		Holden VP Commodore	22	22
(Australia) Kevin Heffernan	74	PACE Racing	Holden VP Commodore	DNF	23
(Australia) Mark Larkham	10	Larkham Motor Sport	Ford EF Falcon	17	DNF
(Australia) Chris Smerdon	39	Challenge Motorsport	Holden VR Commodore	19	DNF
(Australia) Craig Lowndes	15	Holden Racing Team	Holden VR Commodore	6	DNF

=== Bathurst 1000 Super Touring support race ===
This meeting was a support event of the 1996 AMP Bathurst 1000.

Driver	No.	Team	Car	Race 1	Race 2	Race 3
(New Zealand) Jim Richards	05	Volvo Cars Australia	Volvo 850	2	2	1
(Australia) Brad Jones	3	Brad Jones Racing	Audi A4 Quattro	3	9	2
(Australia) Paul Morris	1	BMW Motorsport Australia	BMW 318i	4	DNS	3
(New Zealand) Craig Baird	10	BMW Motorsport Australia	BMW 318i	1	1	4
(Australia) Geoff Brabham	83	BMW Motorsport Australia	BMW 318i	7	3	5
(Italy) Tamara Vidali	4	Brad Jones Racing	Audi A4 Quattro	5	4	6
(Australia) Geoff Full	95	Phoenix Motorsport	Peugeot 405 Mi16	DNF	DNF	7
(Australia) Justin Mathews	16	Bob Holden Motors	BMW 318i	10	DNS	8
(Australia) Bob Tweedie	36	BMW International	BMW 318i	9	6	9
(Australia) Kurt Kratzmann	33		Ford Sierra	11	8	10
(Australia) Bob Holden	13	Bob Holden Motors	BMW M3	DNS	DNS	11
(Australia) Stephen Voight	28		BMW M3	8	5	12
(Australia) Paul Nelson	16	Bob Holden Motors	BMW 318i	DNS	7	DNS
(Australia) Mark Adderton	96	Phoenix Motorsport	Peugeot 405 Mi16	6	10	DNS
(Australia) Dennis Rogers	13	Bob Holden Motors	BMW M3	12	DNS	DNS
(Australia) Ross Jones	58	Triple P Racing	BMW 318iS	DNS	DNS	DNS

=== Mobil New Zealand Sprints ===
This was a two event invitational series held in New Zealand late in 1996. Seven teams (two of them with just a single car) were freighted to New Zealand and held three races at each of two events held at Pukekohe Park Raceway and a Wellington street circuit. Points were allocated 20–16–14–12–10–8–6–4–2–1 for each of the six races.

Driver	No.	Team	Car	Pukekohe			Wellington			Total
Driver	No.	Team	Car	Race 1	Race 2	Race 3	Race 1	Race 2	Race 3	Total
(New Zealand) Greg Murphy	1	Holden Racing Team	Holden VR Commodore	1	1	1	6	3	1	102
(Australia) John Bowe	18	Dick Johnson Racing	Ford EF Falcon	7	2	3	1	1	4	88
(Australia) Glenn Seton	30	Glenn Seton Racing	Ford EF Falcon	2	7	6	5	5	3	64
(New Zealand) Paul Radisich	6	Alan Jones Racing	Ford EF Falcon	4	DNS	DNF	4	4	2	52
(Australia) Dick Johnson	17	Dick Johnson Racing	Ford EF Falcon	6	4	4	8	10	8	41
(Australia) Neil Crompton	4	Wayne Gardner Racing	Holden VR Commodore	DNF	DNS	DNS	3	2	5	40
(Australia) Larry Perkins	11	Perkins Engineering	Holden VP Commodore	Ret	8	5	2	Ret	7	36
(Australia) Russell Ingall	8	Perkins Engineering	Holden VR Commodore	8	6	7	7	6	Ret	32
(Australia) Tony Longhurst	25	Longhurst Racing	Ford EF Falcon	9	5	2	12	9	Ret	30
(Australia) Peter Brock	05	Holden Racing Team	Holden VR Commodore	3	9	8	10	7	Ret	27
(Australia) Alan Jones	9	Alan Jones Racing	Ford EF Falcon	5	3	Ret	9	Ret	DNS	26
(Australia) Wayne Gardner	7	Wayne Gardner Racing	Holden VR Commodore	DNF	DNS	DNS	11	8	6	12
