= 1997 ATCC Launceston round =

Round 4 of 10 in the 1997 Australian Touring Car Championship

(Tasmania) 1997 ATCC Launceston round
Event Information
- Round 4 of 10 in the 1997 Australian Touring Car Championship
- Date: 2–4 May 1997
- Location: Launceston, Tasmania
- Venue: Symmons Plains Raceway
- Weather: Rain

Results
Race 1
Distance	22 laps	50 km
Pole position	Peter Brock; Holden Racing Team	59.0766
Winner	Peter Brock; Holden Racing Team	22:15.0952
Race 2
Distance	18 laps	30 km
Winner	Greg Murphy; Holden Racing Team	18:01.3297
Race 3
Distance	22 laps	50 km
Winner	Greg Murphy; Holden Racing Team	30:04.4000
Round Results
First	Greg Murphy; Holden Racing Team	86 pts
Second	Peter Brock; Holden Racing Team	82 pts
Third	Glenn Seton; Glenn Seton Racing	70 pts

The 1997 ATCC Launceston round was the fourth round of the 1997 Australian Touring Car Championship. It was held on the weekend of 2 to 4 May at Symmons Plains Raceway in Launceston, Tasmania.

The Holden Racing Team dominated the weekend with Peter Brock claiming pole position and winning race one while teammate Greg Murphy won the second and third races en route to claiming overall round honours.

== Background ==
The event was held on the weekend of 2 to 4 May 1997. It was the 29th ATCC/V8 Supercar event to be held at Symmons Plains Raceway and consisted of three 50 km sprint races.

The conditions throughout the weekend consisted of constant heavy rain and bitterly low temperatures. Such was the cold climate that at least three marshals were transferred to hospital with hypothermia.

=== Entry list ===
A total of 17 drivers entered the weekend. Jason Bright made his Australian Touring Car debut driving for Garry Rogers Motorsport after regular driver Steven Richards was unavailable due to his Super Touring commitments.

Notable absentees from the entry list included Gibson Motorsport's Mark Skaife as the team continued to struggle with finances. Skaife did attend in the round albeit in a commentary role.

== Race report ==
=== Qualifying ===
Peter Brock secured his first pole position of the season by less than one tenth of a second over teammate Greg Murphy.

Pos	No	Name	Team	Vehicle	Time
1	05	(Australia) Peter Brock	Holden Racing Team	Holden Commodore (VS)	0:59.0766
2	15	(New Zealand) Greg Murphy	Holden Racing Team	Holden Commodore (VS)	0:59.1480
3	30	(Australia) Glenn Seton	Glenn Seton Racing	Ford Falcon (EL)	0:59.2935
4	11	(Australia) Larry Perkins	Perkins Engineering	Holden Commodore (VS)	0:59.4269
5	7	(Australia) Wayne Gardner	Wayne Gardner Racing	Holden Commodore (VS)	0:59.6246
6	46	(New Zealand) John Faulkner	John Faulkner Racing	Holden Commodore (VS)	0:59.6452
7	18	(Australia) John Bowe	Dick Johnson Racing	Ford Falcon (EL)	0:59.8310
8	8	(Australia) Russell Ingall	Perkins Engineering	Holden Commodore (VS)	0:59.9251
9	10	(Australia) Mark Larkham	Larkham Motorsport	Ford Falcon (EL)	1:00.0034
10	34	(Australia) Jason Bright	Garry Rogers Motorsport	Holden Commodore (VS)	1:00.0155
11	9	(Australia) Alan Jones	Alan Jones Racing	Ford Falcon (EL)	1:00.1344
12	25	(Australia) Tony Longhurst	Longhurst Racing	Ford Falcon (EL)	1:00.2821
13	52	(Australia) Steven Ellery	Longhurst Racing	Ford Falcon (EL)	1:00.3769
14	17	(Australia) Dick Johnson	Dick Johnson Racing	Ford Falcon (EL)	1:00.6161
15	6	(Australia) Steve Reed	Lansvale Racing Team	Holden Commodore (VS)	1:00.8638
16	45	(Australia) Darren Hossack	Wynn's Racing	Holden Commodore (VR)	1:03.1613
17	23	(Australia) Ray Hislop	Ray Hislop	Ford Falcon (EF)	1:04.5421

=== Race 1 ===
Both Holden Racing Team cars shot away from the field immediately while Glenn Seton lost a handful of positions due to a slow start. Larry Perkins assumed third position but promptly lost it after straying wide at the hairpin thus ceding position to Wayne Gardner.

While Seton struggled with visibility, John Faulkner had worked his way past and began to battle Perkins for fourth. The battle between the three drivers ensued for the duration of the race, eventually working in favour of Seton after Perkins strayed wide on the approach to turn one with two laps remaining. Alan Jones struggled with the rear brakes before retiring from the race on lap 12. Dick Johnson crashed on the front straight on lap 20 and failed to make it to the finish.

At the front, Peter Brock remained untroubled on the run to the flag to take victory ahead of teammate Greg Murphy. Such was the dominance of the Holden Racing Team outfit that third placed Wayne Gardner was left 13 seconds arrears of Brock.

Pos.	No.	Name	Team	Vehicle	Laps	Time	Grid
1	05	(Australia) Peter Brock	Holden Racing Team	Holden Commodore (VS)	22	22:15.0952	1
2	15	(New Zealand) Greg Murphy	Holden Racing Team	Holden Commodore (VS)	22	+ 1.655	2
3	7	(Australia) Wayne Gardner	Wayne Gardner Racing	Holden Commodore (VS)	22	+ 13.045	5
4	30	(Australia) Glenn Seton	Glenn Seton Racing	Ford Falcon (EL)	22	+ 16.878	3
5	46	(New Zealand) John Faulkner	John Faulkner Racing	Holden Commodore (VS)	22	+ 17.657	5
6	11	(Australia) Larry Perkins	Perkins Engineering	Holden Commodore (VS)	22	+ 24.192	6
7	18	(Australia) John Bowe	Dick Johnson Racing	Ford Falcon (EL)	22	+ 26.269	7
8	8	(Australia) Russell Ingall	Perkins Engineering	Holden Commodore (VS)	22	+ 28.178	8
9	34	(Australia) Jason Bright	Garry Rogers Motorsport	Holden Commodore (VS)	22	+ 39.610	9
10	25	(Australia) Tony Longhurst	Longhurst Racing	Ford Falcon (EL)	22	+ 50.781	10
11	10	(Australia) Mark Larkham	Larkham Motorsport	Ford Falcon (EL)	22	+ 51.468	9
12	52	(Australia) Steven Ellery	Longhurst Racing	Ford Falcon (EL)	22	+ 52.288	13
Ret	6	(Australia) Steve Reed	Lansvale Racing Team	Holden Commodore (VS)	21	Retired	15
Ret	17	(Australia) Dick Johnson	Dick Johnson Racing	Ford Falcon (EL)	20	Accident	14
Ret	45	(Australia) Darren Hossack	Wynn's Racing	Holden Commodore (VR)	18	Retired	16
Ret	9	(Australia) Alan Jones	Alan Jones Racing	Ford Falcon (EL)	12	Brakes	11
Ret	23	(Australia) Ray Hislop	Ray Hislop	Ford Falcon (EF)	5	Mechanical	17
Fastest Lap: Greg Murphy (Holden Racing Team) - 0:59.448 on lap 5

=== Race 2 ===
Murphy took the lead off the start while Gardner snatched second place from Brock to split the Holden Racing Team duo. By this stage of the weekend, it was evident that the Bridgestone tyres were the superior compound and those without suffered in comparison.

For much of the race, Seton pressured Brock for second place. Down the pack, Tony Longhurst battled with a Ford contingent that included teammate Steven Ellery, Dick Johnson, Mark Larkham and Alan Jones. In his debut V8 Supercar round, Jason Bright made an impression by scything through the battle pack into a ninth-place finish. Ray Hislop spun off at turn one with a handful of laps remaining. One lap later, Gardner was spun at the hairpin after being hit by Seton on the approach to the corner thus relegating Gardner to fifth place.

On lap 20, Bright spun off the circuit and became bogged in the runoff area. At the same time, Gardner was broadsided by Russell Ingall at the hairpin, and all three drivers were subsequently out of the race. With all three cars rendered immobile, in addition to the stranded car of Hislop, the deteriorating conditions led to the officials deploying the red flag and declaring the race a few laps shy of the 22-lap scheduled race distance. Murphy was declared the winner from Brock and Seton.

Pos.	No.	Name	Team	Vehicle	Laps	Time	Grid
1	15	(New Zealand) Greg Murphy	Holden Racing Team	Holden Commodore (VS)	18	18:01.3297	2
2	05	(Australia) Peter Brock	Holden Racing Team	Holden Commodore (VS)	18	+ 3.876	1
3	30	(Australia) Glenn Seton	Glenn Seton Racing	Ford Falcon (EL)	18	+ 6.917	4
4	46	(New Zealand) John Faulkner	John Faulkner Racing	Holden Commodore (VS)	18	+ 11.022	5
5	7	(Australia) Wayne Gardner	Wayne Gardner Racing	Holden Commodore (VS)	18	+ 14.141	3
6	8	(Australia) Russell Ingall	Perkins Engineering	Holden Commodore (VS)	18	+ 16.119	8
7	11	(Australia) Larry Perkins	Perkins Engineering	Holden Commodore (VS)	18	+ 17.029	6
8	18	(Australia) John Bowe	Dick Johnson Racing	Ford Falcon (EL)	18	+ 17.577	7
9	34	(Australia) Jason Bright	Garry Rogers Motorsport	Holden Commodore (VS)	18	+ 38.651	9
10	17	(Australia) Dick Johnson	Dick Johnson Racing	Ford Falcon (EL)	18	+ 42.080	14
11	25	(Australia) Tony Longhurst	Longhurst Racing	Ford Falcon (EL)	18	+ 45.334	10
12	52	(Australia) Steven Ellery	Longhurst Racing	Ford Falcon (EL)	18	+ 46.457	12
13	10	(Australia) Mark Larkham	Larkham Motorsport	Ford Falcon (EL)	18	+ 47.034	11
14	9	(Australia) Alan Jones	Alan Jones Racing	Ford Falcon (EL)	18	+ 50.073	16
15	6	(Australia) Steve Reed	Lansvale Racing Team	Holden Commodore (VS)	18	+ 56.982	13
16	45	(Australia) Darren Hossack	Wynn's Racing	Holden Commodore (VR)	18	+ 58.017	15
Ret	23	(Australia) Ray Hislop	Ray Hislop	Ford Falcon (EF)	15	Spun off	17
Fastest Lap: Greg Murphy (Holden Racing Team) - 0:59.1197 on lap 4

=== Race 3 ===
Despite expressing doubt as to whether his car could be repaired in time for the race, Wayne Gardner would line up on the third row for the event. Ray Hislop would not line up to take the start.

Gardner, who earlier expressed disgust over the driving standards in the category, escorted John Faulkner off the track on the exit of turn one. Faulkner then skirted through the gravel trap, made heavy contact with the tyre barrier and was forced out of the race. Jones withdrew from the race at the end of lap one due to a mechanical issue. Bright's impressive debut weekend came to an end at the hairpin after suffering from a misfire and damage to the front-right suspension after contact with the barrier. With multiple stranded cars on track, the safety car was deployed.

On the resumption of the race, Murphy continued to lead from Brock and Seton. The remainder of the race was largely undramatic and the Holden Racing Team duo cruised home in formation to take a one-two victory with Murphy claiming overall round honours for the first time in his V8 Supercar career.

Pos.	No.	Name	Team	Vehicle	Laps	Time	Grid
1	15	(New Zealand) Greg Murphy	Holden Racing Team	Holden Commodore (VS)	22	30:04.4000	1
2	05	(Australia) Peter Brock	Holden Racing Team	Holden Commodore (VS)	22	+ 0.162	2
3	30	(Australia) Glenn Seton	Glenn Seton Racing	Ford Falcon (EL)	22	+ 3.862	3
4	7	(Australia) Wayne Gardner	Wayne Gardner Racing	Holden Commodore (VS)	22	+ 14.572	5
5	18	(Australia) John Bowe	Dick Johnson Racing	Ford Falcon (EL)	22	+ 15.319	8
6	8	(Australia) Russell Ingall	Perkins Engineering	Holden Commodore (VS)	22	+ 16.159	6
7	11	(Australia) Larry Perkins	Perkins Engineering	Holden Commodore (VS)	22	+ 18.806	7
8	25	(Australia) Tony Longhurst	Longhurst Racing	Ford Falcon (EL)	22	+ 25.481	11
9	17	(Australia) Dick Johnson	Dick Johnson Racing	Ford Falcon (EL)	22	+ 26.152	10
10	10	(Australia) Mark Larkham	Larkham Motorsport	Ford Falcon (EL)	22	+ 29.311	13
11	52	(Australia) Steven Ellery	Longhurst Racing	Ford Falcon (EL)	22	+ 29.802	12
Ret	34	(Australia) Jason Bright	Garry Rogers Motorsport	Holden Commodore (VS)	7	Engine	9
Ret	45	(Australia) Darren Hossack	Wynn's Racing	Holden Commodore (VR)	4	Retired	16
Ret	6	(Australia) Steve Reed	Lansvale Racing Team	Holden Commodore (VS)	1	Retired	15
Ret	46	(New Zealand) John Faulkner	John Faulkner Racing	Holden Commodore (VS)	0	Accident	4
Ret	9	(Australia) Alan Jones	Alan Jones Racing	Ford Falcon (EL)	0	Mechanical	14
DNS	23	(Australia) Ray Hislop	Ray Hislop	Ford Falcon (EF)		Did not start	
Fastest Lap: Greg Murphy (Holden Racing Team) - 0:59.8897 on lap 17

== Championship points ==
Round points tally

Pos.	No	Driver	Team	Pts
1	15	(New Zealand) Greg Murphy	Holden Racing Team	86
2	05	(Australia) Peter Brock	Holden Racing Team	82
3	30	(Australia) Glenn Seton	Glenn Seton Racing	70
4	7	(Australia) Wayne Gardner	Wayne Gardner Racing	66
5	18	(Australia) John Bowe	Dick Johnson Racing	50

Drivers' Championship standings after Round 4

Pos.	No	Driver	Team	Pts
1	30	(Australia) Glenn Seton	Glenn Seton Racing	294
2	8	(Australia) Russell Ingall	Perkins Engineering	256
3	18	(Australia) John Bowe	Dick Johnson Racing	240
4	15	(New Zealand) Greg Murphy	Holden Racing Team	226
5	7	(Australia) Wayne Gardner	Wayne Gardner Racing	198
