= 1997 ATCC Lakeside round =

Round 7 of 10 in the 1997 Australian Touring Car Championship

(Queensland) 1997 ATCC Lakeside round
Event Information
- Round 7 of 10 in the 1997 Australian Touring Car Championship
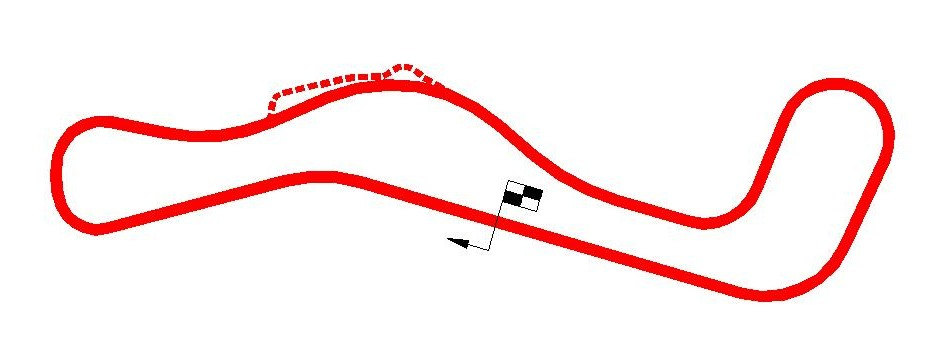
- Date: 13–15 June 1997
- Location: Kurwongbah, Queensland
- Venue: Lakeside International Raceway
- Weather: Sunny

Results
Race 1
Distance	18 laps	40 km
Pole position	John Bowe; Dick Johnson Racing	50.8514
Winner	Glenn Seton; Glenn Seton Racing	15:41.2960
Race 2
Distance	23 laps	50 km
Winner	John Bowe; Dick Johnson Racing	20:05.6429
Race 3
Distance	23 laps	50 km
Winner	Russell Ingall; Perkins Engineering	20:08.1660
Round Results
First	John Bowe; Dick Johnson Racing	82 pts
Second	Russell Ingall; Perkins Engineering	68 pts
Third	Dick Johnson; Dick Johnson Racing	68 pts

The 1997 ATCC Lakeside round was the seventh round of the 1997 Australian Touring Car Championship. It was held on the weekend of 13 to 15 June at Lakeside International Raceway in Kurwongbah, Queensland.

The front-running Ford's of Glenn Seton and the Dick Johnson Racing cars of Dick Johnson and John Bowe set the pace throughout the weekend. Bowe won the pole position and won the second race en route to claiming overall round honours. Championship leader Seton won the first race but a crash in the second race crippled his points tally for the weekend.

Russell Ingall was the best performing Holden driver of the weekend, winning the third race and claiming second overall for the weekend. This result allowed him to close the gap to Seton in the championship standings.

== Background ==
The event was held on the weekend of 13 to 15 June 1997. It was the 28th ATCC/V8 Supercar event to be held at Lakeside International Raceway and consisted of three 50 km sprint races.

=== Entry list ===
A total of 22 drivers were entered into the weekend; ten of whom were entered as privateers.

Two notable absentees from this round were Wayne Gardner and Mark Skaife, both failing to make the grid owing to budgetary constraints for their respective teams.

Multiple drivers would return to the series for this round including Paul Romano, Danny Osbourne and John Trimble. Kerryn Brewer would make her first appearance in the series for Perkins Engineering in this round.

== Race report ==
=== Qualifying ===
Pos	No	Name	Team	Vehicle	Time
1	18	(Australia) John Bowe	Dick Johnson Racing	Ford Falcon (EL)	50.8514
2	30	(Australia) Glenn Seton	Glenn Seton Racing	Ford Falcon (EL)	50.9307
3	9	(Australia) Alan Jones	Alan Jones Racing	Ford Falcon (EL)	51.0174
4	17	(Australia) Dick Johnson	Dick Johnson Racing	Ford Falcon (EL)	51.0446
5	25	(Australia) Tony Longhurst	Longhurst Racing	Ford Falcon (EL)	51.1794
6	05	(Australia) Peter Brock	Holden Racing Team	Holden Commodore (VS)	51.2708
7	10	(Australia) Mark Larkham	Larkham Motorsport	Ford Falcon (EL)	51.2788
8	15	(New Zealand) Greg Murphy	Holden Racing Team	Holden Commodore (VS)	51.3039
9	8	(Australia) Russell Ingall	Perkins Engineering	Holden Commodore (VS)	51.3434
10	11	(Australia) Larry Perkins	Perkins Engineering	Holden Commodore (VS)	51.4751
11	46	(New Zealand) John Faulkner	John Faulkner Racing	Holden Commodore (VS)	51.4942
12	3	(Australia) Trevor Ashby	Lansvale Racing Team	Holden Commodore (VS)	51.8967
13	34	(New Zealand) Steven Richards	Garry Rogers Motorsport	Holden Commodore (VS)	51.9160
14	27	(Australia) Terry Finnigan	Terry Finnigan	Holden Commodore (VS)	52.0428
15	24	(Australia) Paul Romano	Romano Racing	Holden Commodore (VS)	52.2192
16	74	(Australia) Kevin Heffernan	PACE Racing	Holden Commodore (VS)	52.6482
17	47	(Australia) John Trimble	Daily Planet Racing	Holden Commodore (VS)	52.7855
18	22	(Australia) Danny Osbourne	Colourscan Motorsport	Ford Falcon (EL)	52.8838
19	45	(Australia) Darren Hossack	Wynn's Racing	Holden Commodore (VR)	53.1079
20	20	(Australia) Ian Palmer	Palmer Promotions	Holden Commodore (VS)	54.4925
21	19	(Australia) Kerryn Brewer	Perkins Engineering	Holden Commodore (VS)	54.7699
22	79	(Australia) Mike Conway	Cadillac Productions	Ford Falcon (EB)	54.7856

=== Privateers Cup ===
Trevor Ashby led away from the start while Kevin Heffernan scythed through to second, immediately applying pressure to Ashby. However, he strayed wide at the first corner sweeper and spun down the order. Terry Finnigan passed Darren Hossack for third and began to chase down Danny Osbourne for second. Hossack then fell into the clutches of John Faulkner, who was hindered by drawing a low grid number. Ashby remained untroubled to the flag to claim victory.

Pos.	No.	Name	Team	Vehicle	Laps	Time	Grid
1	3	(Australia) Trevor Ashby	Lansvale Racing Team	Holden Commodore (VS)	4	3:38.9187	2
2	22	(Australia) Danny Osbourne	Colourscan Motorsport	Ford Falcon (EL)	4	+ 0.655	1
3	27	(Australia) Terry Finnigan	Terry Finnigan	Holden Commodore (VS)	4	+ 1.024	6
4	45	(Australia) Darren Hossack	Wynn's Racing	Holden Commodore (VR)	4	+ 3.430	8
5	46	(New Zealand) John Faulkner	John Faulkner Racing	Holden Commodore (VS)	4	+ 3.575	9
6	47	(Australia) John Trimble	Daily Planet Racing	Holden Commodore (VS)	4	+ 8.900	11
7	79	(Australia) Mike Conway	Cadillac Productions	Ford Falcon (EB)	4	+ 9.040	4
8	20	(Australia) Ian Palmer	Palmer Promotions	Holden Commodore (VS)	4	+ 13.076	10
9	19	(Australia) Kerryn Brewer	Perkins Engineering	Holden Commodore (VS)	4	+ 13.612	7
10	74	(Australia) Kevin Heffernan	PACE Racing	Holden Commodore (VS)	4	+ 14.943	3
DNS	24	(Australia) Paul Romano	Romano Racing	Holden Commodore (VS)		Did not start	
Fastest Lap: John Faulkner (John Faulkner Racing) - 51.8293 on lap 3

=== Race 1 ===
Alan Jones was forced to start the race from pitlane owing to tyre issues. Paul Romano was a non-starter after a crash at The Karrussell in practice inflicted significant damage to his car.

Coming out of The Karrussell, Mark Larkham was spun by Russell Ingall and was subsequently broadsided by an unsighted Ian Palmer. The extensive damage to the two cars left them stranded in the middle of the track and the red flag was displayed.

The race was restarted with the lap count reduced from 23 to 18. Ingall started from the pitlane after encountering clutch issues while Terry Finnigan pulled off the side of the track shortly before the starting grid. Seton led off the line from Bowe and Jones, who was able to restart the race from his original grid position. Danny Osbourne crashed out of the race on the exit of The Karrussell.

Jones began to fall through the pack with Johnson dispatching of him through Dunlop Bridge, and the 1980 Formula One World Champion soon found himself under threat from the chasing pack. Jones continued to struggle with tyres and eventually, on lap 14, he retired from the race. Bowe kept within range of Seton but the championship leader kept the race under control to take victory. Hometown hero Dick Johnson rounded out the podium.

Pos.	No.	Name	Team	Vehicle	Laps	Time	Grid
1	30	(Australia) Glenn Seton	Glenn Seton Racing	Ford Falcon (EL)	18	15:41.2960	2
2	18	(Australia) John Bowe	Dick Johnson Racing	Ford Falcon (EL)	18	+ 0.236	1
3	17	(Australia) Dick Johnson	Dick Johnson Racing	Ford Falcon (EL)	18	+ 8.156	4
4	05	(Australia) Peter Brock	Holden Racing Team	Holden Commodore (VS)	18	+ 10.243	6
5	25	(Australia) Tony Longhurst	Longhurst Racing	Ford Falcon (EL)	18	+ 10.618	5
6	15	(New Zealand) Greg Murphy	Holden Racing Team	Holden Commodore (VS)	18	+ 10.920	8
7	8	(Australia) Russell Ingall	Perkins Engineering	Holden Commodore (VS)	18	+ 12.522	9
8	11	(Australia) Larry Perkins	Perkins Engineering	Holden Commodore (VS)	18	+ 12.956	10
9	34	(New Zealand) Steven Richards	Garry Rogers Motorsport	Holden Commodore (VS)	18	+ 16.117	13
10	46	(New Zealand) John Faulkner	John Faulkner Racing	Holden Commodore (VS)	18	+ 16.333	11
11	3	(Australia) Trevor Ashby	Lansvale Racing Team	Holden Commodore (VS)	18	+ 25.180	12
12	45	(Australia) Darren Hossack	Wynn's Racing	Holden Commodore (VR)	18	+ 30.784	19
13	74	(Australia) Kevin Heffernan	PACE Racing	Holden Commodore (VS)	18	+ 32.590	16
14	19	(Australia) Kerryn Brewer	Perkins Engineering	Holden Commodore (VS)	17	+ 1 lap	21
15	47	(Australia) John Trimble	Daily Planet Racing	Holden Commodore (VS)	14	+ 4 laps	17
Ret	9	(Australia) Alan Jones	Alan Jones Racing	Ford Falcon (EL)	14	Retired	3
Ret	22	(Australia) Danny Osbourne	Colourscan Motorsport	Ford Falcon (EL)	1	Accident	18
Ret	27	(Australia) Terry Finnigan	Terry Finnigan	Holden Commodore (VS)	0	Mechanical	14
Ret	79	(Australia) Mike Conway	Cadillac Productions	Ford Falcon (EB)	0	Retired	22
Ret	10	(Australia) Mark Larkham	Larkham Motorsport	Ford Falcon (EL)	0	Accident	
Ret	20	(Australia) Ian Palmer	Palmer Promotions	Holden Commodore (VS)	0	Accident	
DNS	24	(Australia) Paul Romano	Romano Racing	Holden Commodore (VS)		Did not start	
Fastest Lap: Glenn Seton (Glenn Seton Racing) - 51.4452 on lap 4

=== Race 2 ===
Larkham and Palmer would not make the start owing to the extensive damage inflicted on their cars in the race one crash.

Seton led away from the start with the Dick Johnson Racing duo of Johnson and Bowe in hot pursuit. Darren Hossack's race came to an end on lap four after spinning at The Karrussell and became beached in the gravel trap.

Seton extended his lead gradually over the course of the race but with a handful of laps to go, Bowe began to lay down some fast lap times, breaking the track lap record in the process. At the top of the Eastern Loop, Seton's foot slipped off the brake pedal and speared off the circuit, into the tyre barrier and ended his race. The damage inflicted would render him out of the third and final race as well.

Bowe subsequently enjoyed a trouble-free run to the chequered flag to take his first win of the season ahead of Johnson. Greg Murphy withheld the Castrol Perkins duo behind him to claim a hard-fought podium.

Pos.	No.	Name	Team	Vehicle	Laps	Time	Grid
1	18	(Australia) John Bowe	Dick Johnson Racing	Ford Falcon (EL)	23	20:05.6429	2
2	17	(Australia) Dick Johnson	Dick Johnson Racing	Ford Falcon (EL)	23	+ 3.539	3
3	15	(New Zealand) Greg Murphy	Holden Racing Team	Holden Commodore (VS)	23	+ 4.554	6
4	8	(Australia) Russell Ingall	Perkins Engineering	Holden Commodore (VS)	23	+ 4.827	7
5	11	(Australia) Larry Perkins	Perkins Engineering	Holden Commodore (VS)	23	+ 5.765	8
6	25	(Australia) Tony Longhurst	Longhurst Racing	Ford Falcon (EL)	23	+ 5.980	5
7	46	(New Zealand) John Faulkner	John Faulkner Racing	Holden Commodore (VS)	23	+ 13.796	10
8	05	(Australia) Peter Brock	Holden Racing Team	Holden Commodore (VS)	23	+ 15.836	4
9	9	(Australia) Alan Jones	Alan Jones Racing	Ford Falcon (EL)	23	+ 27.570	16
10	3	(Australia) Trevor Ashby	Lansvale Racing Team	Holden Commodore (VS)	23	+ 27.924	11
11	27	(Australia) Terry Finnigan	Terry Finnigan	Holden Commodore (VS)	23	+ 28.212	17
12	47	(Australia) John Trimble	Daily Planet Racing	Holden Commodore (VS)	23	+ 54.278	15
13	74	(Australia) Kevin Heffernan	PACE Racing	Holden Commodore (VS)	22	+ 1 lap	13
14	19	(Australia) Kerryn Brewer	Perkins Engineering	Holden Commodore (VS)	22	+ 1 lap	14
Ret	30	(Australia) Glenn Seton	Glenn Seton Racing	Ford Falcon (EL)	15	Accident	1
Ret	45	(Australia) Darren Hossack	Wynn's Racing	Holden Commodore (VR)	4	Spun off	12
Ret	34	(New Zealand) Steven Richards	Garry Rogers Motorsport	Holden Commodore (VS)	3	Retired	9
Ret	79	(Australia) Mike Conway	Cadillac Productions	Ford Falcon (EB)	0	Retired	18
DNS	10	(Australia) Mark Larkham	Larkham Motorsport	Ford Falcon (EL)		Did not start	
DNS	20	(Australia) Ian Palmer	Palmer Promotions	Holden Commodore (VS)		Did not start	
DNS	22	(Australia) Danny Osbourne	Colourscan Motorsport	Ford Falcon (EL)		Did not start	
DNS	24	(Australia) Paul Romano	Romano Racing	Holden Commodore (VS)		Did not start	
Fastest Lap: John Bowe (Dick Johnson Racing) - 51.6616 on lap 14

=== Race 3 ===
Johnson suffered a slow getaway and was flanked either side by Ingall and Murphy. In an attempt to cover his position, Johnson made contact with Murphy merely yards off the starting line. This broke the steering in the Holden Racing Team car and was sent off into the gravel trap at The Karrussell, taking Johnson and Steven Richards off the track in process. Murphy pitted at the end of the lap to retire from the race.

Ingall meanwhile had worked his way into the lead and began to defend vigorously from Bowe. Johnson recovered from his earlier issues to scythe through the pack en route to a sixth-place finish. Bowe gradually lost touch with Ingall as the Holden driver went on to win the race and claim second overall for the round. Bowe, by virtue of finishing second, secured enough points to win the overall round.

Pos.	No.	Name	Team	Vehicle	Laps	Time	Grid
1	8	(Australia) Russell Ingall	Perkins Engineering	Holden Commodore (VS)	23	20:08.1660	4
2	18	(Australia) John Bowe	Dick Johnson Racing	Ford Falcon (EL)	23	+ 1.440	1
3	25	(Australia) Tony Longhurst	Longhurst Racing	Ford Falcon (EL)	23	+ 2.115	6
4	05	(Australia) Peter Brock	Holden Racing Team	Holden Commodore (VS)	23	+ 4.222	8
5	11	(Australia) Larry Perkins	Perkins Engineering	Holden Commodore (VS)	23	+ 6.011	5
6	17	(Australia) Dick Johnson	Dick Johnson Racing	Ford Falcon (EL)	23	+ 7.369	2
7	46	(New Zealand) John Faulkner	John Faulkner Racing	Holden Commodore (VS)	23	+ 11.820	7
8	9	(Australia) Alan Jones	Alan Jones Racing	Ford Falcon (EL)	23	+ 12.267	9
9	34	(New Zealand) Steven Richards	Garry Rogers Motorsport	Holden Commodore (VS)	23	+ 15.676	17
10	27	(Australia) Terry Finnigan	Terry Finnigan	Holden Commodore (VS)	23	+ 21.051	11
11	3	(Australia) Trevor Ashby	Lansvale Racing Team	Holden Commodore (VS)	23	+ 21.748	10
12	45	(Australia) Darren Hossack	Wynn's Racing	Holden Commodore (VR)	23	+ 29.327	16
13	74	(Australia) Kevin Heffernan	PACE Racing	Holden Commodore (VS)	23	+ 43.645	13
14	19	(Australia) Kerryn Brewer	Perkins Engineering	Holden Commodore (VS)	22	+ 1 lap	14
15	79	(Australia) Mike Conway	Cadillac Productions	Ford Falcon (EB)	21	+ 2 laps	18
Ret	47	(Australia) John Trimble	Daily Planet Racing	Holden Commodore (VS)	20	Retired	12
Ret	15	(New Zealand) Greg Murphy	Holden Racing Team	Holden Commodore (VS)	0	Steering	3
DNS	30	(Australia) Glenn Seton	Glenn Seton Racing	Ford Falcon (EL)		Did not start	
DNS	10	(Australia) Mark Larkham	Larkham Motorsport	Ford Falcon (EL)		Did not start	
DNS	20	(Australia) Ian Palmer	Palmer Promotions	Holden Commodore (VS)		Did not start	
DNS	22	(Australia) Danny Osbourne	Colourscan Motorsport	Ford Falcon (EL)		Did not start	
DNS	24	(Australia) Paul Romano	Romano Racing	Holden Commodore (VS)		Did not start	
Fastest Lap: Russell Ingall (Perkins Engineering) - 51.8973 on lap 14

== Championship points ==
Round points tally

Pos.	No	Driver	Team	Pts
1	18	(Australia) John Bowe	Dick Johnson Racing	82
2	8	(Australia) Russell Ingall	Perkins Engineering	68
3	17	(Australia) Dick Johnson	Dick Johnson Racing	68
4	25	(Australia) Tony Longhurst	Longhurst Racing	62
5	05	(Australia) Peter Brock	Holden Racing Team	58

Drivers' Championship standings after Round 7

Pos.	No	Driver	Team	Pts
1	30	(Australia) Glenn Seton	Glenn Seton Racing	482
2	8	(Australia) Russell Ingall	Perkins Engineering	474
3	18	(Australia) John Bowe	Dick Johnson Racing	460
4	11	(Australia) Larry Perkins	Perkins Engineering	386
5	05	(Australia) Peter Brock	Holden Racing Team	360
