= 1997 ATCC Mallala round =

Round 9 of 10 in the 1997 Australian Touring Car Championship

(South Australia) 1997 ATCC Mallala round
Event Information
- Round 9 of 10 in the 1997 Australian Touring Car Championship
- Date: 11–13 July 1997
- Location: Mallala, South Australia
- Venue: Mallala Motor Sport Park
- Weather: Sunny

Results
Race 1
Distance	16 laps	40 km
Pole position	Greg Murphy; Holden Racing Team	1:07.6963
Winner	Greg Murphy; Holden Racing Team	19:38.9487
Race 2
Distance	16 laps	40 km
Winner	Greg Murphy; Holden Racing Team	19:41.8469
Race 3
Distance	16 laps	40 km
Winner	Larry Perkins; Perkins Engineering	19:44.3839
Round Results
First	Greg Murphy; Holden Racing Team	86 pts
Second	Larry Perkins; Perkins Engineering	82 pts
Third	Glenn Seton; Glenn Seton Racing	70 pts

The 1997 ATCC Mallala round was the ninth round of the 1997 Australian Touring Car Championship. It was held on the weekend of 11 to 13 July at Mallala Motor Sport Park in Mallala, South Australia.

Greg Murphy secured his first round victory since Tasmania with a largely dominant weekend that included pole position and two race victories. Larry Perkins won the third race of the weekend in what would turn out to be his final solo Australian Touring Car victory.

Glenn Seton's consistency awarded him third overall for the round and allowed him to extend his lead over John Bowe heading into the final round at Oran Park.

== Background ==
The event was held on the weekend of 11 to 13 July 1997. It was the 13th ATCC/V8 Supercar event to be held at Mallala Motor Sport Park and consisted of three 40 km sprint races.

This was the penultimate round for Peter Brock as a full-time driver. As a result, the Mallala venue enjoyed its highest attendance figure ever when 30,500 people made their way to the facility.

=== Entry list ===
A total of 21 drivers were entered into the weekend.

Mark Skaife returned to the championship after missing the previous two rounds at Lakeside and Perth. Stephen White made his championship debut with the Holden Racing Team, Kerryn Brewer made her second appearance with Perkins Engineering and Chris Smerdon returned to the series with Challenge Motorsport.

Dick Johnson entered the weekend nursing an injury in his left arm.

== Race report ==
=== Qualifying ===
Pos	No	Name	Team	Vehicle	Time
1	15	(New Zealand) Greg Murphy	Holden Racing Team	Holden Commodore (VS)	1:07.6963
2	11	(Australia) Larry Perkins	Perkins Engineering	Holden Commodore (VS)	1:07.7352
3	30	(Australia) Glenn Seton	Glenn Seton Racing	Ford Falcon (EL)	1:07.7559
4	05	(Australia) Peter Brock	Holden Racing Team	Holden Commodore (VS)	1:07.7563
5	18	(Australia) John Bowe	Dick Johnson Racing	Ford Falcon (EL)	1:07.7883
6	2	(Australia) Mark Skaife	Gibson Motorsport	Holden Commodore (VS)	1:07.7998
7	9	(Australia) Alan Jones	Alan Jones Racing	Ford Falcon (EL)	1:08.0527
8	8	(Australia) Russell Ingall	Perkins Engineering	Holden Commodore (VS)	1:08.1238
9	10	(Australia) Mark Larkham	Larkham Motorsport	Ford Falcon (EL)	1:08.1866
10	17	(Australia) Dick Johnson	Dick Johnson Racing	Ford Falcon (EL)	1:08.2043
11	34	(New Zealand) Steven Richards	Garry Rogers Motorsport	Holden Commodore (VS)	1:08.2189
12	25	(Australia) Tony Longhurst	Longhurst Racing	Ford Falcon (EL)	1:08.4793
13	97	(Australia) Stephen White	Holden Racing Team	Holden Commodore (VS)	1:08.6771
14	46	(Australia) John Faulkner	John Faulkner Racing	Holden Commodore (VS)	1:08.6992
15	38	(Australia) Mark Poole	James Rosenberg Racing	Holden Commodore (VS)	1:09.2345
16	27	(Australia) Terry Finnigan	Terry Finnigan	Holden Commodore (VS)	1:09.3534
17	45	(Australia) Darren Hossack	Gibson Motorsport	Holden Commodore (VS)	1:09.3616
18	39	(Australia) Chris Smerdon	Challenge Motorsport	Holden Commodore (VS)	1:10.1186
19	19	(Australia) Kerryn Brewer	Perkins Engineering	Holden Commodore (VS)	1:17.8840
	22	(Australia) Danny Osbourne	Colourscan Motorsport	Ford Falcon (EL)	no time
	70	(Australia) John Briggs	Briggs Motorsport	Ford Falcon (EF)	no time

=== Privateers Cup ===
Pos.	No.	Name	Team	Vehicle	Laps	Time	Grid
1	46	(New Zealand) John Faulkner	John Faulkner Racing	Holden Commodore (VS)	3	4:43.7615	1
2	45	(Australia) Darren Hossack	Gibson Motorsport	Holden Commodore (VS)	3	+ 3.121	4
3	19	(Australia) Kerryn Brewer	Perkins Engineering	Holden Commodore (VS)	3	+ 7.532	6
4	27	(Australia) Terry Finnigan	Terry Finnigan	Holden Commodore (VS)	3	+ 7.826	3
5	38	(Australia) Mark Poole	James Rosenberg Racing	Holden Commodore (VS)	3	+ 8.286	2
6	39	(Australia) Chris Smerdon	Challenge Motorsport	Holden Commodore (VS)	3	+ 9.147	5
7	22	(Australia) Danny Osbourne	Colourscan Motorsport	Ford Falcon (EL)	3	+ 11.504	7
Fastest Lap: John Faulkner (John Faulkner Racing) - 1:08.5415 on lap 2

=== Race 1 ===
Brock's weekend got off to a bad start after contact with Mark Skaife at turn one as a result of the latter locking up and making contact with the rear of the Holden Racing Team Commodore. The damage inflicted on the front-right corner of Skaife's car rendered him out of the race soon thereafter. Tony Longhurst's race also came to an end due to engine problems.

The championship trio of Seton, Bowe and Ingall fought over third place in the final laps of the race. Seton managed to withhold the pressure to claim the final step on the podium. Murphy meanwhile controlled the pace to take a comfortable win over Perkins.

Pos.	No.	Name	Team	Vehicle	Laps	Time	Grid
1	15	(New Zealand) Greg Murphy	Holden Racing Team	Holden Commodore (VS)	16	19:38.9487	1
2	11	(Australia) Larry Perkins	Perkins Engineering	Holden Commodore (VS)	16	+ 3.715	2
3	30	(Australia) Glenn Seton	Glenn Seton Racing	Ford Falcon (EL)	16	+ 8.215	3
4	18	(Australia) John Bowe	Dick Johnson Racing	Ford Falcon (EL)	16	+ 8.494	5
5	8	(Australia) Russell Ingall	Perkins Engineering	Holden Commodore (VS)	16	+ 8.805	8
6	17	(Australia) Dick Johnson	Dick Johnson Racing	Ford Falcon (EL)	16	+ 10.797	10
7	9	(Australia) Alan Jones	Alan Jones Racing	Ford Falcon (EL)	16	+ 11.533	7
8	34	(New Zealand) Steven Richards	Garry Rogers Motorsport	Holden Commodore (VS)	16	+ 12.082	11
9	10	(Australia) Mark Larkham	Larkham Motorsport	Ford Falcon (EL)	16	+ 13.955	9
10	38	(Australia) Mark Poole	James Rosenberg Racing	Holden Commodore (VS)	16	+ 19.767	15
11	05	(Australia) Peter Brock	Holden Racing Team	Holden Commodore (VS)	16	+ 22.145	4
12	97	(Australia) Stephen White	Holden Racing Team	Holden Commodore (VS)	16	+ 28.172	13
13	45	(Australia) Darren Hossack	Gibson Motorsport	Holden Commodore (VS)	16	+ 35.534	17
14	39	(Australia) Chris Smerdon	Challenge Motorsport	Holden Commodore (VS)	16	+ 36.031	18
15	19	(Australia) Kerryn Brewer	Perkins Engineering	Holden Commodore (VS)	16	+ 57.446	19
16	22	(Australia) Danny Osbourne	Colourscan Motorsport	Ford Falcon (EL)	16	+ 1:04.942	20
Ret	46	(New Zealand) John Faulkner	John Faulkner Racing	Holden Commodore (VS)	11	Retired	14
Ret	27	(Australia) Terry Finnigan	Terry Finnigan	Holden Commodore (VS)	2	Retired	16
Ret	2	(Australia) Mark Skaife	Gibson Motorsport	Holden Commodore (VS)	0	Accident damage	6
Ret	25	(Australia) Tony Longhurst	Longhurst Racing	Ford Falcon (EL)	0	Engine	12
DNS	70	(Australia) John Briggs	Briggs Motorsport	Ford Falcon (EF)		Did not start	
Fastest Lap: Greg Murphy (Holden Racing Team) - 1:08.3548 on lap 3

=== Race 2 ===
Pos.	No.	Name	Team	Vehicle	Laps	Time	Grid
1	15	(New Zealand) Greg Murphy	Holden Racing Team	Holden Commodore (VS)	16	19:41.8469	1
2	11	(Australia) Larry Perkins	Perkins Engineering	Holden Commodore (VS)	16	+ 5.406	2
3	30	(Australia) Glenn Seton	Glenn Seton Racing	Ford Falcon (EL)	16	+ 6.616	3
4	18	(Australia) John Bowe	Dick Johnson Racing	Ford Falcon (EL)	16	+ 6.818	4
5	8	(Australia) Russell Ingall	Perkins Engineering	Holden Commodore (VS)	16	+ 7.177	5
6	34	(New Zealand) Steven Richards	Garry Rogers Motorsport	Holden Commodore (VS)	16	+ 8.016	8
7	17	(Australia) Dick Johnson	Dick Johnson Racing	Ford Falcon (EL)	16	+ 9.949	6
8	05	(Australia) Peter Brock	Holden Racing Team	Holden Commodore (VS)	16	+ 10.460	11
9	38	(Australia) Mark Poole	James Rosenberg Racing	Holden Commodore (VS)	16	+ 17.762	10
10	46	(New Zealand) John Faulkner	John Faulkner Racing	Holden Commodore (VS)	16	+ 19.541	17
11	25	(Australia) Tony Longhurst	Longhurst Racing	Ford Falcon (EL)	16	+ 20.432	20
12	27	(Australia) Terry Finnigan	Terry Finnigan	Holden Commodore (VS)	16	+ 22.926	18
13	97	(Australia) Stephen White	Holden Racing Team	Holden Commodore (VS)	16	+ 27.277	12
14	45	(Australia) Darren Hossack	Gibson Motorsport	Holden Commodore (VS)	16	+ 34.519	13
15	39	(Australia) Chris Smerdon	Challenge Motorsport	Holden Commodore (VS)	16	+ 42.627	14
16	22	(Australia) Danny Osbourne	Colourscan Motorsport	Ford Falcon (EL)	16	+ 44.197	16
17	19	(Australia) Kerryn Brewer	Perkins Engineering	Holden Commodore (VS)	15	+ 1 lap	15
Ret	9	(Australia) Alan Jones	Alan Jones Racing	Ford Falcon (EL)	14	Retired	7
Ret	10	(Australia) Mark Larkham	Larkham Motorsport	Ford Falcon (EL)	1	Retired	9
DNS	2	(Australia) Mark Skaife	Gibson Motorsport	Holden Commodore (VS)		Did not start	
DNS	70	(Australia) John Briggs	Briggs Motorsport	Ford Falcon (EF)		Did not start	
Fastest Lap: Greg Murphy (Holden Racing Team) - 1:08.1437 on lap 3

=== Race 3 ===
Pos.	No.	Name	Team	Vehicle	Laps	Time	Grid
1	11	(Australia) Larry Perkins	Perkins Engineering	Holden Commodore (VS)	16	19:44.3839	2
2	15	(New Zealand) Greg Murphy	Holden Racing Team	Holden Commodore (VS)	16	+ 0.484	1
3	18	(Australia) John Bowe	Dick Johnson Racing	Ford Falcon (EL)	16	+ 4.979	4
4	30	(Australia) Glenn Seton	Glenn Seton Racing	Ford Falcon (EL)	16	+ 5.456	3
5	34	(New Zealand) Steven Richards	Garry Rogers Motorsport	Holden Commodore (VS)	16	+ 7.555	6
6	25	(Australia) Tony Longhurst	Longhurst Racing	Ford Falcon (EL)	16	+ 10.829	11
7	17	(Australia) Dick Johnson	Dick Johnson Racing	Ford Falcon (EL)	16	+ 11.736	7
8	2	(Australia) Mark Skaife	Gibson Motorsport	Holden Commodore (VS)	16	+ 12.842	20
9	38	(Australia) Mark Poole	James Rosenberg Racing	Holden Commodore (VS)	16	+ 14.442	9
10	8	(Australia) Russell Ingall	Perkins Engineering	Holden Commodore (VS)	16	+ 18.957	5
11	46	(New Zealand) John Faulkner	John Faulkner Racing	Holden Commodore (VS)	16	+ 25.497	10
12	97	(Australia) Stephen White	Holden Racing Team	Holden Commodore (VS)	16	+ 25.871	13
13	27	(Australia) Terry Finnigan	Terry Finnigan	Holden Commodore (VS)	16	+ 31.108	12
14	05	(Australia) Peter Brock	Holden Racing Team	Holden Commodore (VS)	16	+ 36.796	8
15	39	(Australia) Chris Smerdon	Challenge Motorsport	Holden Commodore (VS)	16	+ 39.550	15
16	10	(Australia) Mark Larkham	Larkham Motorsport	Ford Falcon (EL)	16	+ 40.063	19
17	22	(Australia) Danny Osbourne	Colourscan Motorsport	Ford Falcon (EL)	16	+ 47.314	16
18	19	(Australia) Kerryn Brewer	Perkins Engineering	Holden Commodore (VS)	16	+ 1:05.652	17
DNS	9	(Australia) Alan Jones	Alan Jones Racing	Ford Falcon (EL)		Did not start	
DNS	45	(Australia) Darren Hossack	Gibson Motorsport	Holden Commodore (VS)		Did not start	
DNS	70	(Australia) John Briggs	Briggs Motorsport	Ford Falcon (EF)		Did not start	
Fastest Lap: Mark Skaife (Gibson Motorsport) - 1:08.5947 on lap 2

== Championship points ==
Round points tally

Pos.	No	Driver	Team	Pts
1	15	(New Zealand) Greg Murphy	Holden Racing Team	86
2	11	(Australia) Larry Perkins	Perkins Engineering	82
3	30	(Australia) Glenn Seton	Glenn Seton Racing	70
4	18	(Australia) John Bowe	Dick Johnson Racing	68
5	34	(New Zealand) Steven Richards	Garry Rogers Motorsport	52

Drivers' Championship standings after Round 9

Pos.	No	Driver	Team	Pts
1	30	(Australia) Glenn Seton	Glenn Seton Racing	596
2	18	(Australia) John Bowe	Dick Johnson Racing	592
3	8	(Australia) Russell Ingall	Perkins Engineering	572
4	11	(Australia) Larry Perkins	Perkins Engineering	516
5	15	(Australia) Greg Murphy	Holden Racing Team	474
