= 1997 ATCC Eastern Creek round =

Round 6 of 10 in the 1997 Australian Touring Car Championship

(New South Wales) 1997 ATCC Eastern Creek round
Event Information
- Round 6 of 10 in the 1997 Australian Touring Car Championship
- Date: 23–25 May 1997
- Location: Eastern Creek, New South Wales
- Venue: Eastern Creek International Raceway
- Weather: Sunny

Results
Race 1
Distance	12 laps	50 km
Pole position	Glenn Seton; Glenn Seton Racing	1.31.376
Winner	Glenn Seton; Glenn Seton Racing	18:50.5774
Race 2
Distance	12 laps	50 km
Winner	Glenn Seton; Glenn Seton Racing	18:44.1153
Race 3
Distance	12 laps	50 km
Winner	Glenn Seton; Glenn Seton Racing	18:44.2209
Round Results
First	Glenn Seton; Glenn Seton Racing	90 pts
Second	John Bowe; Dick Johnson Racing	76 pts
Third	Dick Johnson; Dick Johnson Racing	72 pts

The 1997 ATCC Eastern Creek round was the sixth round of the 1997 Australian Touring Car Championship. It was held on the weekend of 23 to 25 May at Eastern Creek International Raceway in Sydney, New South Wales.

Glenn Seton dominated the round by taking pole position and winning all three races en route to claiming overall round honours. Amidst the dominance, John Bowe proved the closest contender of the weekend having led most of the final race and claiming second overall for the round. Teammate Dick Johnson rounded out the podium in round points.

== Background ==
The event was held on the weekend of 23 to 25 May 1997. It was the fourth ATCC/V8 Supercar event to be held at Eastern Creek International Raceway and consisted of three 50 km sprint races.

=== Entry list ===
A total of 25 drivers were entered into the weekend; 13 of whom were entered as privateers.

Alan Jones returned to the series after missing the previous round at Winton. Trevor Ashby also made his return to the series. Bob Pearson, Greg Crick and Neil Schembri made their first appearances for the year.

== Race report ==
=== Qualifying ===
Pos	No	Name	Team	Vehicle	Time
1	30	(Australia) Glenn Seton	Glenn Seton Racing	Ford Falcon (EL)	1:31.376
2	15	(New Zealand) Greg Murphy	Holden Racing Team	Holden Commodore (VS)	1:31.382
3	05	(Australia) Peter Brock	Holden Racing Team	Holden Commodore (VS)	1:31.658
4	18	(Australia) John Bowe	Dick Johnson Racing	Ford Falcon (EL)	1:31.707
5	9	(Australia) Alan Jones	Alan Jones Racing	Ford Falcon (EL)	1:31.842
6	17	(Australia) Dick Johnson	Dick Johnson Racing	Ford Falcon (EL)	1:31.882
7	7	(Australia) Wayne Gardner	Wayne Gardner Racing	Holden Commodore (VS)	1:31.987
8	11	(Australia) Larry Perkins	Perkins Engineering	Holden Commodore (VS)	1:32.226
9	8	(Australia) Russell Ingall	Perkins Engineering	Holden Commodore (VS)	1:32.373
10	2	(Australia) Mark Skaife	Gibson Motorsport	Holden Commodore (VS)	1:32.480
11	25	(Australia) Tony Longhurst	Longhurst Racing	Ford Falcon (EL)	1:32.603
12	10	(Australia) Mark Larkham	Larkham Motorsport	Ford Falcon (EL)	1:32.615
13	46	(New Zealand) John Faulkner	John Faulkner Racing	Holden Commodore (VS)	1:33.083
14	27	(Australia) Terry Finnigan	Terry Finnigan	Holden Commodore (VS)	1:33.143
15	49	(Australia) Greg Crick	Alcair Racing	Holden Commodore (VS)	1:33.812
16	33	(Australia) Bob Pearson	Pro-Duct Motorsport	Holden Commodore (VS)	1:34.062
17	3	(Australia) Trevor Ashby	Lansvale Racing Team	Holden Commodore (VS)	1:34.513
18	34	(New Zealand) Steven Richards	Garry Rogers Motorsport	Holden Commodore (VS)	1:34.560
19	74	(Australia) Kevin Heffernan	PACE Racing	Holden Commodore (VS)	1:34.983
20	45	(Australia) Darren Hossack	Wynn's Racing	Holden Commodore (VR)	1:35.070
21	26	(Australia) John Cotter	M3 Motorsport	Holden Commodore (VP)	1:36.542
22	36	(Australia) Neil Schembri	Gearbox Motorsport	Holden Commodore (VS)	1:38.549
23	62	(Australia) Wayne Russell	Novocastrian Motorsport	Holden Commodore (VS)	1:38.819
24	77	(Australia) Richard Mork	V8 Racing	Holden Commodore (VP)	1:40.525
	79	(Australia) Mike Conway	Cadillac Productions	Holden Commodore (VP)	no time

=== Race 1 ===
Before the commencement of the race, Greg Murphy pulled over to the side of the track after experiencing a mechanical failure.

Mark Skaife made a remarkable start to leap from tenth on the grid to lead the field heading into the first corner. It was soon adjudged however to have been a false start from the Gibson Motorsport driver and promptly pitted for a stop-go penalty.

Wayne Gardner was spun by Russell Ingall on the exit of turn four and backed his Commodore into the tyre barrier. After struggling with tyres, Alan Jones ceded position to Dick Johnson who began to hunt down Seton for the lead. Jones would continue to lose position, eventually finishing in seventh place.

Ultimately, Seton's lead proved insurmountable as the Ford Credit driver proved the in-form driver of the race. Seton cruised home to take victory ahead of Johnson and Bowe. Mark Larkham and Greg Crick collided on the penultimate lap which led to both drivers sustaining damage and forced them to limp around to the finish line.

Pos.	No.	Name	Team	Vehicle	Laps	Time	Grid
1	30	(Australia) Glenn Seton	Glenn Seton Racing	Ford Falcon (EL)	12	18:50.5774	1
2	17	(Australia) Dick Johnson	Dick Johnson Racing	Ford Falcon (EL)	12	+ 2.166	6
3	18	(Australia) John Bowe	Dick Johnson Racing	Ford Falcon (EL)	12	+ 3.128	4
4	8	(Australia) Russell Ingall	Perkins Engineering	Holden Commodore (VS)	12	+ 4.217	9
5	05	(Australia) Peter Brock	Holden Racing Team	Holden Commodore (VS)	12	+ 5.839	3
6	11	(Australia) Larry Perkins	Perkins Engineering	Holden Commodore (VS)	12	+ 8.668	8
7	9	(Australia) Alan Jones	Alan Jones Racing	Ford Falcon (EL)	12	+ 12.040	5
8	27	(Australia) Terry Finnigan	Terry Finnigan	Holden Commodore (VS)	12	+ 12.241	14
9	25	(Australia) Tony Longhurst	Longhurst Racing	Ford Falcon (EL)	12	+ 13.430	11
10	46	(New Zealand) John Faulkner	John Faulkner Racing	Holden Commodore (VS)	12	+ 13.899	13
11	7	(Australia) Wayne Gardner	Wayne Gardner Racing	Holden Commodore (VS)	12	+ 20.608	7
12	2	(Australia) Mark Skaife	Gibson Motorsport	Holden Commodore (VS)	12	+ 21.594	10
13	34	(New Zealand) Steven Richards	Garry Rogers Motorsport	Holden Commodore (VS)	12	+ 26.240	18
14	45	(Australia) Darren Hossack	Wynns Racing	Holden Commodore (VR)	12	+ 31.046	20
15	33	(Australia) Bob Pearson	Pro-Duct Motorsport	Holden Commodore (VS)	12	+ 32.457	16
16	10	(Australia) Mark Larkham	Larkham Motorsport	Ford Falcon (EL)	12	+ 37.447	12
17	3	(Australia) Trevor Ashby	Lansvale Racing Team	Holden Commodore (VS)	12	+ 38.607	17
18	74	(Australia) Kevin Heffernan	PACE Racing	Holden Commodore (VS)	12	+ 56.261	19
19	26	(Australia) John Cotter	M3 Motorsport	Holden Commodore (VP)	12	+ 57.914	21
20	49	(Australia) Greg Crick	Alcair Racing	Holden Commodore (VS)	12	+ 1:15.475	15
21	36	(Australia) Neil Schembri	Gearbox Motorsport	Holden Commodore (VS)	12	+ 1:17.386	22
22	62	(Australia) Wayne Russell	Novocastrian Motorsport	Holden Commodore (VS)	12	+ 1:22.600	23
23	77	(Australia) Richard Mork	V8 Racing	Holden Commodore (VP)	11	+ 1 lap	24
Ret	79	(Australia) Mike Conway	Cadillac Productions	Holden Commodore (VP)	10	Mechanical	25
DNS	15	(New Zealand) Greg Murphy	Holden Racing Team	Holden Commodore (VS)		Did not start	2
Fastest Lap: Glenn Seton (Glenn Seton Racing) - 1:32.586

=== Race 2 ===
From the back row of the grid, Greg Murphy made a determined start to climb from 24th to 12th within the first few corners. Up the front, Seton retained the lead while Bowe leapt his teammate who had fallen in behind Larry Perkins.

Alan Jones' weekend went from bad to worse when he was forced to retire from the race after an issue with regards to tyres. While Bowe was able to break away from the rest of the pack, he was unable to match the pace of Seton who once again cruised home to take a relatively easy win.

Pos.	No.	Name	Team	Vehicle	Laps	Time	Grid
1	30	(Australia) Glenn Seton	Glenn Seton Racing	Ford Falcon (EL)	12	18:44.1153	1
2	18	(Australia) John Bowe	Dick Johnson Racing	Ford Falcon (EL)	12	+ 3.067	3
3	11	(Australia) Larry Perkins	Perkins Engineering	Holden Commodore (VS)	12	+ 8.734	6
4	17	(Australia) Dick Johnson	Dick Johnson Racing	Ford Falcon (EL)	12	+ 9.078	2
5	8	(Australia) Russell Ingall	Perkins Engineering	Holden Commodore (VS)	12	+ 9.658	4
6	05	(Australia) Peter Brock	Holden Racing Team	Holden Commodore (VS)	12	+ 10.039	5
7	15	(New Zealand) Greg Murphy	Holden Racing Team	Holden Commodore (VS)	12	+ 10.235	24
8	2	(Australia) Mark Skaife	Gibson Motorsport	Holden Commodore (VS)	12	+ 13.860	12
9	7	(Australia) Wayne Gardner	Wayne Gardner Racing	Holden Commodore (VS)	12	+ 14.193	11
10	46	(New Zealand) John Faulkner	John Faulkner Racing	Holden Commodore (VS)	12	+ 18.408	10
11	25	(Australia) Tony Longhurst	Longhurst Racing	Ford Falcon (EL)	12	+ 18.525	9
12	34	(New Zealand) Steven Richards	Garry Rogers Motorsport	Holden Commodore (VS)	12	+ 18.901	13
13	27	(Australia) Terry Finnigan	Terry Finnigan	Holden Commodore (VS)	12	+ 27.375	8
14	49	(Australia) Greg Crick	Alcair Racing	Holden Commodore (VS)	12	+ 33.743	20
15	45	(Australia) Darren Hossack	Wynns Racing	Holden Commodore (VR)	12	+ 34.092	14
16	10	(Australia) Mark Larkham	Larkham Motorsport	Ford Falcon (EL)	12	+ 39.375	16
17	3	(Australia) Trevor Ashby	Lansvale Racing Team	Holden Commodore (VS)	12	+ 39.651	17
18	74	(Australia) Kevin Heffernan	PACE Racing	Holden Commodore (VS)	12	+ 55.527	18
19	26	(Australia) John Cotter	M3 Motorsport	Holden Commodore (VP)	12	+ 1:06.697	19
20	36	(Australia) Neil Schembri	Gearbox Motorsport	Holden Commodore (VS)	12	+ 1:19.396	21
21	62	(Australia) Wayne Russell	Novocastrian Motorsport	Holden Commodore (VS)	12	+ 1:36.029	22
Ret	33	(Australia) Bob Pearson	Pro-Duct Motorsport	Holden Commodore (VS)	5	Retired	15
Ret	9	(Australia) Alan Jones	Alan Jones Racing	Ford Falcon (EL)	5	Tyres	7
Ret	77	(Australia) Richard Mork	V8 Racing	Holden Commodore (VP)	0	Retired	23
DNS	79	(Australia) Mike Conway	Cadillac Productions	Holden Commodore (VP)		Did not start	
Fastest Lap: Glenn Seton (Glenn Seton Racing) - 1:32.442

=== Race 3 ===
Bowe won the holeshot heading into turn one while Perkins endured a horrific start and fell down the pack. Mark Larkham was spun on the exit of turn two and Ingall began to omit smoke after suffering contact in the opening melee. Mark Skaife lost a lap after pitting to replace a flat tyre. A notable starter was Terry Finnigan who made up six positions in the opening lap.

Seton continued to pressure Bowe for the lead and Murphy shadowed both of them to make it a close fought three-way battle for the win. On lap seven, Murphy's charge came to a halt after spinning off the track owing to a mechanical failure. Despite skepticism as to whether Seton would risk jeopardising the round, Seton passed Bowe at turn two in a forceful move on Bowe. Perkins and Steven Richards came to blows in the dying laps at turn two, sending both off into a spin. Perkins would not continue for much longer as fire enveloped the car one lap from the end.

From there, Seton remained unchallenged to the flag to complete a clean sweep of the weekend, earning maximum championship points in the process. Finnigan completed a remarkable privateer effort by finishing sixth for the race and seventh overall for the round.

Pos.	No.	Name	Team	Vehicle	Laps	Time	Grid
1	30	(Australia) Glenn Seton	Glenn Seton Racing	Ford Falcon (EL)	12	18:44.2209	1
2	18	(Australia) John Bowe	Dick Johnson Racing	Ford Falcon (EL)	12	+ 1.647	2
3	17	(Australia) Dick Johnson	Dick Johnson Racing	Ford Falcon (EL)	12	+ 4.579	4
4	8	(Australia) Russell Ingall	Perkins Engineering	Holden Commodore (VS)	12	+ 5.260	5
5	05	(Australia) Peter Brock	Holden Racing Team	Holden Commodore (VS)	12	+ 8.026	6
6	27	(Australia) Terry Finnigan	Terry Finnigan	Holden Commodore (VS)	12	+ 14.100	13
7	25	(Australia) Tony Longhurst	Longhurst Racing	Ford Falcon (EL)	12	+ 14.306	11
8	46	(New Zealand) John Faulkner	John Faulkner Racing	Holden Commodore (VS)	12	+ 20.359	10
9	34	(New Zealand) Steven Richards	Garry Rogers Motorsport	Holden Commodore (VS)	12	+ 21.717	12
10	3	(Australia) Trevor Ashby	Lansvale Racing Team	Holden Commodore (VS)	12	+ 33.644	17
11	7	(Australia) Wayne Gardner	Wayne Gardner Racing	Holden Commodore (VS)	12	+ 33.758	9
12	10	(Australia) Mark Larkham	Larkham Motorsport	Ford Falcon (EL)	12	+ 35.479	16
13	45	(Australia) Darren Hossack	Wynns Racing	Holden Commodore (VR)	12	+ 39.362	15
14	33	(Australia) Bob Pearson	Pro-Duct Motorsport	Holden Commodore (VS)	12	+ 39.682	22
15	74	(Australia) Kevin Heffernan	PACE Racing	Holden Commodore (VS)	12	+ 54.633	18
16	26	(Australia) John Cotter	M3 Motorsport	Holden Commodore (VP)	12	+ 1:10.137	19
17	36	(Australia) Neil Schembri	Gearbox Motorsport	Holden Commodore (VS)	12	+ 1:28.635	20
18	2	(Australia) Mark Skaife	Gibson Motorsport	Holden Commodore (VS)	11	+ 1 lap	8
19	62	(Australia) Wayne Russell	Novocastrian Motorsport	Holden Commodore (VS)	10	+ 2 laps	21
Ret	11	(Australia) Larry Perkins	Perkins Engineering	Holden Commodore (VS)	11	Fire	3
Ret	15	(New Zealand) Greg Murphy	Holden Racing Team	Holden Commodore (VS)	7	Spun off	7
Ret	49	(Australia) Greg Crick	Alcair Racing	Holden Commodore (VS)	7	Retired	14
Ret	9	(Australia) Alan Jones	Alan Jones Racing	Ford Falcon (EL)	6	Retired	23
DNS	77	(Australia) Richard Mork	V8 Racing	Holden Commodore (VP)		Did not start	
DNS	79	(Australia) Mike Conway	Cadillac Productions	Holden Commodore (VP)		Did not start	
Fastest Lap: Greg Murphy (Holden Racing Team) - 1:32.433

== Championship points ==
Round points tally

Pos.	No	Driver	Team	Pts
1	30	(Australia) Glenn Seton	Glenn Seton Racing	90
2	18	(Australia) John Bowe	Dick Johnson Racing	76
3	17	(Australia) Dick Johnson	Dick Johnson Racing	72
4	8	(Australia) Russell Ingall	Perkins Engineering	64
5	05	(Australia) Peter Brock	Holden Racing Team	58

Drivers' Championship standings after Round 6

Pos.	No	Driver	Team	Pts
1	30	(Australia) Glenn Seton	Glenn Seton Racing	452
2	8	(Australia) Russell Ingall	Perkins Engineering	406
3	18	(Australia) John Bowe	Dick Johnson Racing	378
4	11	(Australia) Larry Perkins	Perkins Engineering	332
5	05	(Australia) Peter Brock	Holden Racing Team	302
