= 1997 Australian Touring Car season =

Seasons
- ← 1996 1998 →

The 1997 Australian Touring Car season was the 38th year of touring car racing in Australia since the first runnings of the Australian Touring Car Championship and the fore-runner of the present day Bathurst 1000, the Armstrong 500.

Two major touring car categories raced in Australia during 1997, V8 Supercar and Super Touring. Between them there were 26 touring car race meetings held during 1997; a ten-round series for V8 Supercars, the 1997 Australian Touring Car Championship (ATCC); an eight-round series for Super Touring, the 1997 Australian Super Touring Championship (ASTC); an unofficial four round series for V8 Supercars, the 1997 ARDC AMSCAR series (the final edition of AMSCAR); support programme events at the 1997 Australian Grand Prix and 1997 Sunbelt IndyCarnival and three stand alone long distance races, nicknamed 'enduros'.

== Results and standings ==
=== Race calendar ===
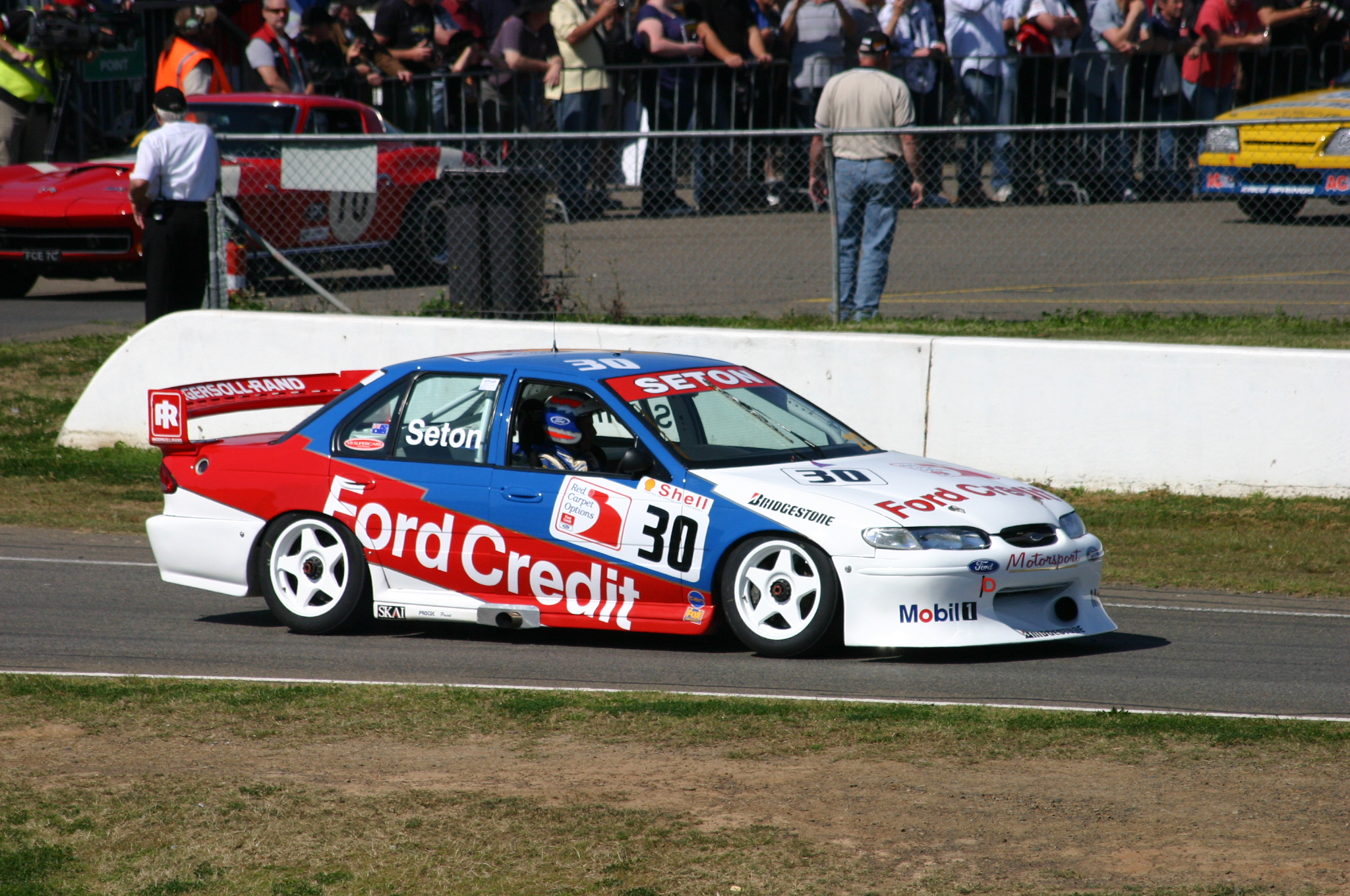
The Ford EL Falcon in which Glenn Seton won the 1997 Australian Touring Car Championship

The 1997 Australian touring car season consisted of 26 events.

Date	Series	Circuit	City / state	Winner	Team	Car	Report
7–9 Mar	Super Touring GT-P Race	Albert Park	Melbourne, Victoria	Jim Richards	Volvo Cars Australia	Volvo 850	
7–9 Mar	TAC V8 Supercar Showdown	Albert Park	Melbourne, Victoria	Russell Ingall	Perkins Engineering	Holden VS Commodore	
15 Mar	ATCC Round 1	Calder Park Raceway	Melbourne, Victoria	Wayne Gardner	Wayne Gardner Racing	Holden VS Commodore	
5–6 Apr	Hog's Breath Cafe V8 Supercar Challenge	Surfers Paradise street circuit	Surfers Paradise, Queensland	Russell Ingall	Perkins Engineering	Holden VS Commodore	
13 Apr	ATCC Round 2	Phillip Island Grand Prix Circuit	Phillip Island, Victoria	Russell Ingall	Perkins Engineering	Holden VS Commodore	
27 Apr	ATCC Round 3	Sandown International Raceway	Melbourne, Victoria	Glenn Seton	Glenn Seton Racing	Ford EL Falcon	
4 May	ATCC Round 4	Symmons Plains Raceway	Launceston, Tasmania	Greg Murphy	Holden Racing Team	Holden VS Commodore	
4 May	ASTC Round 1	Lakeside International Raceway	Brisbane, Queensland	Paul Morris	Paul Morris Motorsport	BMW 320i	
18 May	ATCC Round 5	Winton Motor Raceway	Benalla, Victoria	Russell Ingall	Perkins Engineering	Holden VS Commodore	
25 May	ATCC Round 6	Eastern Creek Raceway	Sydney, New South Wales	Glenn Seton	Glenn Seton Racing	Ford EL Falcon	
1 Jun	ASTC Round 2	Phillip Island Grand Prix Circuit	Phillip Island, Victoria	Paul Morris	Paul Morris Motorsport	BMW 320i	
15 Jun	ATCC Round 7	Lakeside International Raceway	Brisbane, Queensland	John Bowe	Dick Johnson Racing	Ford EL Falcon	
22 Jun	ASTC Round 3	Calder Park Raceway	Melbourne, Victoria	Geoff Brabham	Paul Morris Motorsport	BMW 320i	
22 Jun	AMSCAR Round 1	Eastern Creek Raceway	Sydney, New South Wales	Allan McCarthy	West Coast Racing	Ford EL Falcon	
6 Jul	ATCC Round 8	Barbagallo Raceway	Perth, Western Australia	Peter Brock	Holden Racing Team	Holden VS Commodore	
13 Jul	ATCC Round 9	Mallala Motor Sport Park	Adelaide, South Australia	Greg Murphy	Holden Racing Team	Holden VS Commodore	
20 Jul	ASTC Round 4	Amaroo Park	Sydney, New South Wales	Brad Jones	Brad Jones Racing	Audi A4 Quattro	
20 Jul	AMSCAR Round 2	Amaroo Park	Sydney, New South Wales	Mal Rose	Mal Rose Racing	Holden VS Commodore	
3 Aug	ATCC Round 10	Oran Park Raceway	Sydney, New South Wales	Greg Murphy	Holden Racing Team	Holden VS Commodore	
10 Aug	ASTC Round 5	Winton Motor Raceway	Benalla, Victoria	Paul Morris	Paul Morris Motorsport	BMW 320i	
24 Aug	ASTC Round 6	Mallala Motor Sport Park	Adelaide, South Australia	Cameron McConville	Brad Jones Racing	Audi A4 Quattro	
31 Aug	AMSCAR Round 3	Eastern Creek Raceway	Sydney, New South Wales	Mal Rose	Mal Rose Racing	Holden VS Commodore	
14 Sep	Tickford Sandown 500	Sandown International Raceway	Melbourne, Victoria	Greg Murphy; Craig Lowndes	Holden Racing Team	Holden VS Commodore	report
5 Oct	AMP Bathurst 1000	Mount Panorama Circuit	Bathurst, New South Wales	Geoff Brabham; David Brabham	Paul Morris Motorsport	BMW 320i	report
19 Oct	Primus 1000 Classic	Mount Panorama Circuit	Bathurst, New South Wales	Russell Ingall; Larry Perkins	Perkins Engineering	Holden VS Commodore	report
26 Oct	ASTC Round 7	Lakeside International Raceway	Brisbane, Queensland	Paul Morris	Paul Morris Motorsport	BMW 320i	
9 Nov	ASTC Round 8	Amaroo Park	Sydney, New South Wales	Geoff Brabham	Paul Morris Motorsport	BMW 320i	
7 Dec	AMSCAR Round 4	Eastern Creek Raceway	Sydney, New South Wales	Michael Donaher	Clive Wiseman Racing	Holden VS Commodore	

=== Super Touring GT-P Race ===
This meeting was a support event of the 1997 Australian Grand Prix. The thin Super Touring field was bolstered by cars from the Australian GT-Production Car Championship (indicated in italics).

Driver	No.	Team	Car	Race 1	Race 2
(New Zealand) Jim Richards	6	Volvo Cars Australia	Volvo 850	1	1
(New Zealand) Steven Richards	34	Garry Rogers Motorsport	Honda Accord	2	2
(Australia) Geoff Brabham	83	BMW Motorsport Australia	BMW 320i	DSQ	3
(Australia) Paul Morris	2	BMW Motorsport Australia	BMW 320i	DSQ	4
(Australia) Brad Jones	1	Brad Jones Racing	Audi A4 Quattro	DNF	5
(Australia) Alan Jones	3	Brad Jones Racing	Audi A4 Quattro	3	6
(Australia) Bob Tweedie	79	IBC Motorsport	Vauxhall Cavalier	4	7
(Australia) Cameron McConville	22	Warwick Fabrics	Porsche 993 RSCS	5	8
(Australia) John Bowe	10	Ross Palmer Motorsport	Ferrari F355 Challenge	7	9
(Australia) Justin Mathews	16	Bob Holden Motors	BMW 318i	6	10
(Australia) Rusty French	28		Porsche 993 RSCS	8	11
(Australia) Max Dunn	46		Porsche 993 RSCS	10	12
(Australia) Ross Palmer	72	Ross Palmer Motorsport	Ferrari F355 Challenge	DNF	13
(New Zealand) Tony Newman	37	TC Motorsport	Peugeot 405 Mi16	9	14
(Australia) Guy Gibbons	33		Subaru Impreza WRX	11	15
(Australia) Ian McAllister	66		Volvo 850 T5-R	13	16
(Australia) Eric Houghton	4	Zega Automotive Group	Mitsubishi Lancer RS-E Evo IV	DNF	17
(Australia) Murray Carter	18		Nissan 200SX Turbo	14	18
(Australia) Colin Osborne	21	Osborne Motorsport	Toyota MR2 Bathurst	12	19
(Australia) Andrej Pavicevic	31		Subaru Impreza WRX	DNF	DNS
(Australia) Peter Hills	88	Knight Racing	Ford Mondeo	DNS	DNS

=== TAC V8 Supercar Showdown ===
This meeting was a support event of the 1997 Australian Grand Prix.

Driver	No.	Team	Car	Race 1	Race 2	Race 3
(Australia) Russell Ingall	8	Perkins Engineering	Holden VS Commodore	1	1	1
(Australia) Larry Perkins	11	Perkins Engineering	Holden VS Commodore	2	2	2
(Australia) Peter Brock	05	Holden Racing Team	Holden VS Commodore	6	3	3
(Australia) John Bowe	18	Dick Johnson Racing	Ford EL Falcon	DNS	5	4
(New Zealand) Greg Murphy	15	Holden Racing Team	Holden VS Commodore	3	8	5
(Australia) Wayne Gardner	7	Wayne Gardner Racing	Holden VS Commodore	DNS	7	6
(Australia) Dick Johnson	17	Dick Johnson Racing	Ford EL Falcon	7	4	7
(Australia) Alan Jones	9	Alan Jones Racing	Ford EL Falcon	5	6	8
(New Zealand) John Faulkner	46	John Faulkner Racing	Holden VS Commodore	22	11	9
(Australia) Tony Longhurst	25	Longhurst Racing	Ford EL Falcon	14	9	10
(Australia) Mark Noske	97	Holden Racing Team	Holden VS Commodore	9	10	11
(Australia) Steve Ellery	52	Longhurst Racing	Ford EL Falcon	24	12	12
(Australia) Glenn Seton	30	Glenn Seton Racing	Ford EL Falcon	4	DNS	13
(Australia) Trevor Ashby	3	Lansvale Racing Team	Holden VS Commodore	11	15	14
(Australia) Mark Skaife	2	Gibson Motorsport	Holden VS Commodore	DNF	13	15
(United States) Kevin Schwantz	75	John Sidney Racing	Ford EF Falcon	26	18	16
(Australia) Tomas Mezera	47	Daily Planet Racing	Holden VS Commodore	DNF	17	17
(New Zealand) Steven Richards	34	Garry Rogers Motorsport	Holden VS Commodore	12	14	18
(Australia) Terry Finnigan	27		Holden VS Commodore	15	DNF	19
(Australia) Kevin Heffernan	74	PACE Racing	Holden VS Commodore	25	21	20
(Australia) Mark Larkham	10	Larkham Motor Sport	Ford EL Falcon	10	20	21
(Australia) Anthony Tratt	42		Holden VP Commodore	17	16	22
(Australia) Chris Smerdon	39	Challenge Motorsport	Holden VS Commodore	16	19	23
(Australia) Malcolm Stenniken	14		Holden VR Commodore	18	28	24
(Australia) Ian Palmer	20	Palmer Promotions	Holden VS Commodore	19	25	25
(Australia) Wayne Russell	62		Holden VP Commodore	20	24	26
(Australia) Shaun Walker	99		Holden VS Commodore	23	27	27
(Australia) Mike Conway	79	Cadillac Productions	Holden VP Commodore	21	DNF	28
(Australia) John Cotter	26	M3 Motorsport	Holden VP Commodore	DNF	26	29
(Australia) Neil Crompton	4	Wayne Gardner Racing	Holden VS Commodore	8	23	DNF
(Australia) Mark Poole	38	James Rosenberg Racing	Holden VS Commodore	13	22	DNS
(Australia) Rob Middleton	66	Clive Wiseman Racing	Holden VP Commodore	DNF	DNS	DNS

=== Hog's Breath V8 Supercar Challenge ===
This meeting was a support event of the 1997 Sunbelt IndyCarnival.

Driver	No.	Team	Car	Race 1	Race 2
(Australia) Russell Ingall	8	Perkins Engineering	Holden VS Commodore	2	1
(Australia) Larry Perkins	11	Perkins Engineering	Holden VS Commodore	5	2
(Australia) Wayne Gardner	7	Wayne Gardner Racing	Holden VS Commodore	7	3
(Australia) Neil Crompton	4	Wayne Gardner Racing	Holden VS Commodore	6	4
(Australia) Tony Longhurst	25	Longhurst Racing	Ford EL Falcon	8	5
(Australia) Alan Jones	9	Alan Jones Racing	Ford EL Falcon	3	6
(Australia) Mark Larkham	10	Larkham Motor Sport	Ford EL Falcon	10	7
(New Zealand) John Faulkner	46	John Faulkner Racing	Holden VS Commodore	9	8
(Australia) Peter Brock	05	Holden Racing Team	Holden VS Commodore	4	9
(Australia) Steve Ellery	52	Longhurst Racing	Ford EL Falcon	13	10
(Australia) Steven Johnson	49	Alcair Racing	Holden VS Commodore	DNF	11
(Australia) Tomas Mezera	47	Daily Planet Racing	Holden VS Commodore	DNF	12
(Australia) John Bowe	18	Dick Johnson Racing	Ford EL Falcon	DNF	13
(Australia) Steve Reed	3	Lansvale Racing Team	Holden VS Commodore	DNF	14
(Australia) Kevin Heffernan	74	PACE Racing	Holden VS Commodore	DNF	15
(Australia) Garry Willmington	41	Garry Willmington Performance	Ford EB Falcon	16	16
(Australia) Wayne Russell	62		Holden VP Commodore	14	17
(New Zealand) Greg Murphy	15	Holden Racing Team	Holden VS Commodore	1	DNF
(Australia) Mark Poole	38	James Rosenberg Racing	Holden VS Commodore	12	DNF
(Australia) Danny Osborne	22	Colourscan Motorsport	Ford EF Falcon	15	DNF
(Australia) Paul Romano	24	Romano Racing	Holden VS Commodore	11	DNF
(Australia) Glenn Seton	30	Glenn Seton Racing	Ford EL Falcon	DNF	DNS
(Australia) Dick Johnson	17	Dick Johnson Racing	Ford EL Falcon	DNF	DNS
(New Zealand) Steven Richards	34	Garry Rogers Motorsport	Holden VS Commodore	DNF	DNS
(Australia) Terry Finnigan	27		Holden VS Commodore	DNF	DNS
