= 1997 Australian Touring Car Championship =

Motor racing competition

Seasons
- ← 1996 1998 →

The 1997 Australian Touring Car Championship was a CAMS sanctioned Australian motor racing title open to 5.0 Litre Touring Cars complying with Group 3A regulations. The championship, which was the 38th Australian Touring Car Championship, began on 15 March at Calder Park Raceway and ended on 3 August at Oran Park Raceway after 10 rounds.

Promoted as the Shell Australian Touring Car Championship, the series was won by Glenn Seton driving a Ford EL Falcon.

== Teams and drivers ==
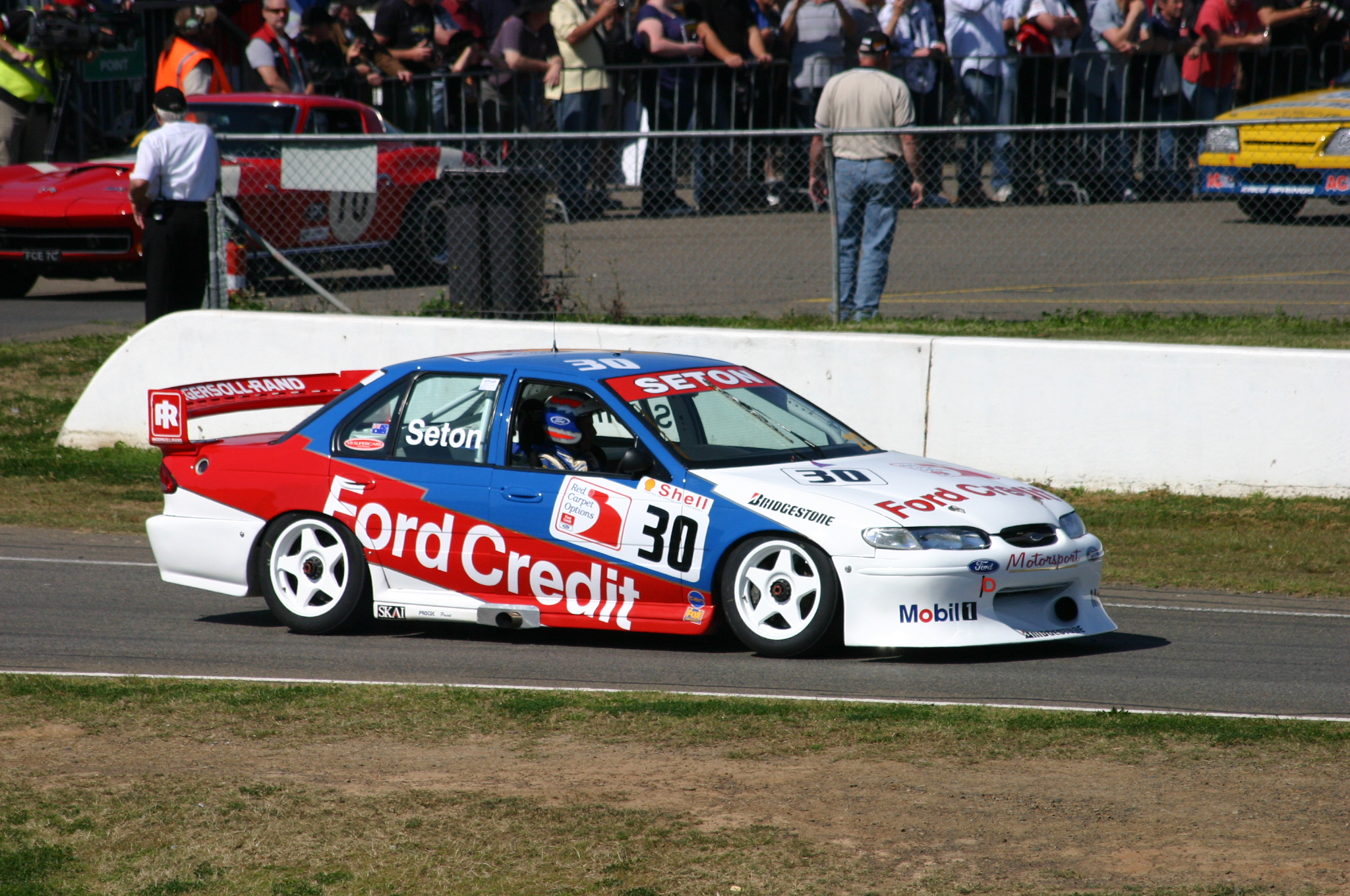
The Ford EL Falcon in which Glenn Seton won the 1997 Australian Touring Car Championship. The car is pictured above in 2011 – in its 1997 ATCC colours.

The following teams and drivers competed in the 1997 Australian Touring Car Championship.

| Team | Car | No | Drivers |
|---|---|---|---|
| Gibson Motorsport | Holden VS Commodore | 2 | (Australia) Mark Skaife |
| Gibson Motorsport | Holden VS Commodore | 45 | (Australia) Darren Hossack |
| Lansvale Racing Team | Holden VS Commodore | 3 | (Australia) Trevor Ashby |
| Lansvale Racing Team | Holden VS Commodore | 6 | (Australia) Steve Reed |
| Holden Racing Team | Holden VS Commodore | 05 | (Australia) Peter Brock |
| Holden Racing Team | Holden VS Commodore | 15 | (New Zealand) Greg Murphy |
| Holden Racing Team | Holden VS Commodore | 97 | (Australia) Stephen White |
| Wayne Gardner Racing | Holden VS Commodore | 7 | (Australia) Wayne Gardner |
| Perkins Engineering | Holden VS Commodore | 8 | (Australia) Russell Ingall |
| Perkins Engineering | Holden VS Commodore | 11 | (Australia) Larry Perkins |
| Perkins Engineering | Holden VS Commodore | 16 | (Australia) Melinda Price |
| Perkins Engineering | Holden VS Commodore | 19 | (Australia) Kerryn Brewer |
| Alan Jones Racing | Ford EL Falcon | 9 | (Australia) Alan Jones |
| Larkham Motor Sport | Ford EL Falcon | 10 | (Australia) Mark Larkham |
| Malcolm Stenniken | Holden VR Commodore | 14 | (Australia) Malcolm Stenniken |
| Dick Johnson Racing | Ford EL Falcon | 17 | (Australia) Dick Johnson |
| Dick Johnson Racing | Ford EL Falcon | 18 | (Australia) John Bowe |
| Palmer Promotions | Holden VS Commodore | 20 | (Australia) Ian Palmer |
| Colourscan Motorsport | Ford EF Falcon; Ford EL Falcon | 22 | (Australia) Danny Osborne |
| Ray Hislop | Ford EF Falcon | 23 | (Australia) Ray Hislop |
| Romano Racing | Holden VS Commodore | 24 | (Australia) Paul Romano |
| Longhurst Racing | Ford EL Falcon | 25 | (Australia) Tony Longhurst |
| Longhurst Racing | Ford EL Falcon | 52 | (Australia) Steven Ellery |
| M3 Motorsport | Holden VP Commodore | 26 | (Australia) Peter Doulman (Australia) John Cotter |
| Terry Finnigan | Holden VS Commodore | 27 | (Australia) Terry Finnigan |
| Glenn Seton Racing | Ford EL Falcon | 30 | (Australia) Glenn Seton |
| Phil Johnson | Holden VS Commodore | 31 | (Australia) Grant Johnson |
| West Coast Racing | Ford EL Falcon | 32 | (Australia) Allan McCarthy |
| West Coast Racing | Ford EL Falcon | 35 | (Australia) Claude Giorgi |
| Pro-Duct Motorsport | Holden VS Commodore | 33 | (Australia) Bob Pearson |
| Garry Rogers Motorsport | Holden VS Commodore | 34 | (New Zealand) Steven Richards (Australia) Jason Bright |
| Gearbox Motorsport | Holden VR Commodore; Holden VS Commodore | 36 | (Australia) Neil Schembri |
| James Rosenberg Racing | Holden VS Commodore | 38 | (Australia) Mark Poole |
| Challenge Motorsport | Holden VS Commodore | 39 | (Australia) Chris Smerdon |
| Michael Hart | Holden VR Commodore | 40 | (Australia) Michael Hart |
| Michael Hart | Holden VR Commodore | 42 | (Australia) Peter Lawrence |
| Garry Willmington Performance | Ford EB Falcon | 41 | (Australia) Garry Willmington |
| Wynn's Racing | Holden VR Commodore | 45 | (Australia) Darren Hossack |
| John Faulkner Racing | Holden VS Commodore | 46 | (New Zealand) John Faulkner |
| Daily Planet Racing | Holden VS Commodore | 47 | (Australia) John Trimbole |
| Alcair Racing | Holden VS Commodore | 49 | (Australia) Greg Crick (Australia) Steven Johnson |
| Truckie Parsons | Holden VS Commodore | 55 | (Australia) David Parsons |
| Novocastrian Motorsport | Holden VS Commodore | 62 | (Australia) Wayne Russell |
| Briggs Motor Sport | Ford EF Falcon | 70 | (Australia) John Briggs |
| PACE Racing | Holden VS Commodore | 74 | (Australia) Kevin Heffernan |
| V8 Racing | Holden VP Commodore | 77 | (Australia) Richard Mork |
| Cadillac Productions | Holden VP Commodore; Ford EB Falcon | 79 | (Australia) Mike Conway |
| Don Pulver | Holden VP Commodore | 88 | (Australia) Don Pulver |
| Geoff Kendrick | Holden VS Commodore | 92 | (Australia) Geoff Kendrick |
| Shaun Walker | Holden VS Commodore | 99 | (Australia) Shaun Walker |

== Race calendar ==
The championship was contested over ten rounds with three races per round.

| Rd. | Circuit | Location / state | Date | Round winner | Car | Team | Round |
|---|---|---|---|---|---|---|---|
| 1 | Calder Park Raceway | Melbourne, Victoria | 13–15 Mar | Wayne Gardner | Holden VS Commodore | Wayne Gardner Racing | |
| 2 | Phillip Island Grand Prix Circuit | Phillip Island, Victoria | 11–13 Apr | Russell Ingall | Holden VS Commodore | Perkins Engineering | |
| 3 | Sandown International Raceway | Melbourne, Victoria | 25–27 Apr | Glenn Seton | Ford EF Falcon | Glenn Seton Racing | |
| 4 | Symmons Plains Raceway | Launceston, Tasmania | 2–4 May | Greg Murphy | Holden VS Commodore | Holden Racing Team | Report |
| 5 | Winton Motor Raceway | Benalla, Victoria | 16–18 May | Russell Ingall | Holden VS Commodore | Perkins Engineering | |
| 6 | Eastern Creek Raceway | Sydney, New South Wales | 23–25 May | Glenn Seton | Ford EF Falcon | Glenn Seton Racing | Report |
| 7 | Lakeside International Raceway | Brisbane, Queensland | 13–15 Jun | John Bowe | Ford EF Falcon | Dick Johnson Racing | Report |
| 8 | Barbagallo Raceway | Perth, Western Australia | 4–6 Jul | Peter Brock | Holden VS Commodore | Holden Racing Team | |
| 9 | Mallala Motor Sport Park | Mallala, South Australia | 11–13 Jul | Greg Murphy | Holden VS Commodore | Holden Racing Team | Report |
| 10 | Oran Park Raceway | Sydney, New South Wales | 1–3 Aug | Greg Murphy | Holden VS Commodore | Holden Racing Team | |

Event locations

=== Race winners ===
| Round | Race | Circuit | Winner | Team |
|---|---|---|---|---|
| 1 | 1 | Calder Park Raceway | Greg Murphy | Holden Racing Team |
| 1 | 2 | Calder Park Raceway | Wayne Gardner | Wayne Gardner Racing |
| 1 | 3 | Calder Park Raceway | Glenn Seton | Glenn Seton Racing |
| 2 | 4 | Phillip Island Grand Prix Circuit | Glenn Seton | Glenn Seton Racing |
| 2 | 5 | Phillip Island Grand Prix Circuit | Russell Ingall | Perkins Engineering |
| 2 | 6 | Phillip Island Grand Prix Circuit | Larry Perkins | Perkins Engineering |
| 3 | 7 | Sandown International Raceway | Glenn Seton | Glenn Seton Racing |
| 3 | 8 | Sandown International Raceway | Glenn Seton | Glenn Seton Racing |
| 3 | 9 | Sandown International Raceway | Glenn Seton | Glenn Seton Racing |
| 4 | 10 | Symmons Plains Raceway | Peter Brock | Holden Racing Team |
| 4 | 11 | Symmons Plains Raceway | Greg Murphy | Holden Racing Team |
| 4 | 12 | Symmons Plains Raceway | Greg Murphy | Holden Racing Team |
| 5 | 13 | Winton Motor Raceway | Larry Perkins | Perkins Engineering |
| 5 | 14 | Winton Motor Raceway | Russell Ingall | Perkins Engineering |
| 5 | 15 | Winton Motor Raceway | Russell Ingall | Perkins Engineering |
| 6 | 16 | Eastern Creek Raceway | Glenn Seton | Glenn Seton Racing |
| 6 | 17 | Eastern Creek Raceway | Glenn Seton | Glenn Seton Racing |
| 6 | 18 | Eastern Creek Raceway | Glenn Seton | Glenn Seton Racing |
| 7 | 19 | Lakeside International Raceway | Glenn Seton | Glenn Seton Racing |
| 7 | 20 | Lakeside International Raceway | John Bowe | Dick Johnson Racing |
| 7 | 21 | Lakeside International Raceway | Russell Ingall | Perkins Engineering |
| 8 | 22 | Barbagallo Raceway | Larry Perkins | Perkins Engineering |
| 8 | 23 | Barbagallo Raceway | John Bowe | Dick Johnson Racing |
| 8 | 24 | Barbagallo Raceway | Greg Murphy | Holden Racing Team |
| 9 | 25 | Mallala Motor Sport Park | Greg Murphy | Holden Racing Team |
| 9 | 26 | Mallala Motor Sport Park | Greg Murphy | Holden Racing Team |
| 9 | 27 | Mallala Motor Sport Park | Larry Perkins | Perkins Engineering |
| 10 | 28 | Oran Park Raceway | Peter Brock | Holden Racing Team |
| 10 | 29 | Oran Park Raceway | Alan Jones | Alan Jones Racing |
| 10 | 30 | Oran Park Raceway | Glenn Seton | Glenn Seton Racing |

== Points system ==
Championship points were awarded on a 30–26–24–22–20–18–16–14–12–10–8–6–4–2–1 basis to the top 15 finishers in each race.

== Championship results ==
| Pos. | Driver | Car | Penalty | Cal | Phi | San | Sym | Win | Eas | Lak | Bar | Mal | Ora | Total |
|---|---|---|---|---|---|---|---|---|---|---|---|---|---|---|
| 1 | Glenn Seton | Ford EL Falcon | 0 | 80 | 54 | 90 | 70 | 68 | 90 | 30 | 44 | 70 | 72 | 668 |
| 2 | John Bowe | Ford EL Falcon | 0 | 50 | 62 | 78 | 50 | 62 | 76 | 82 | 64 | 68 | 16 | 608 |
| 3 | Russell Ingall | Holden VS Commodore | 0 | 62 | 82 | 62 | 50 | 86 | 64 | 68 | 48 | 50 | Ret | 572 |
| 4 | Greg Murphy | Holden VS Commodore | 0 | 62 | 46 | 30 | 86 | 36 | 16 | 42 | 70 | 86 | 76 | 550 |
| 5 | Larry Perkins | Holden VS Commodore | 0 | 38 | 78 | 42 | 50 | 82 | 42 | 54 | 48 | 82 | 32 | 548 |
| 6 | Peter Brock | Holden VS Commodore | 0 | 42 | 32 | 28 | 82 | 60 | 58 | 58 | 74 | 24 | 62 | 520 |
| 7 | Dick Johnson | Ford EL Falcon | 0 | 14 | 50 | 42 | 22 | 40 | 72 | 68 | 0 | 50 | 36 | 384 |
| 8 | Tony Longhurst | Ford EL Falcon | 0 | 18 | 30 | 48 | 32 | 4 | 36 | 62 | 38 | 26 | 64 | 358 |
| 9 | Wayne Gardner | Holden VS Commodore | 0 | 82 | 20 | 28 | 66 | 54 | 28 | | | | 54 | 332 |
| 10 | John Faulkner | Holden VS Commodore | 0 | 14 | 42 | 38 | 42 | 28 | 34 | 42 | 20 | 18 | 46 | 324 |
| 11 | Alan Jones | Ford EL Falcon | 0 | 60 | 60 | 22 | 2 | | 16 | 26 | 62 | 16 | 54 | 318 |
| 12 | Steven Richards | Holden VS Commodore | 0 | 12 | 24 | 26 | | 9 | 22 | 24 | 42 | 52 | 52 | 263 |
| 13 | Mark Skaife | Holden VS Commodore | 0 | 50 | | 68 | | 14 | 20 | | | 14 | | 166 |
| 14 | Mark Poole | Holden VS Commodore | 0 | 20 | 24 | 24 | | 16 | | | 20 | 34 | | 138 |
| 15 | Mark Larkham | Ford EL Falcon | 0 | 6 | Ret | 4 | 22 | 34 | 6 | Ret | 32 | 12 | 18 | 134 |
| 16 | Terry Finnigan | Holden VS Commodore | 0 | 2 | 7 | 0 | | 20 | 18 | 18 | 20 | 10 | 9 | 122 |
| 17 | Darren Hossack | Holden VS Commodore | 0 | 0 | 6 | 0 | Ret | 8 | 7 | 12 | 22 | 6 | 6 | 67 |
| 18 | Steve Ellery | Ford EL Falcon | 0 | 26 | 10 | 2 | 20 | | | | | | | 58 |
| 19 | Trevor Ashby | Holden VS Commodore | 0 | | 3 | 3 | | | 10 | 26 | | | 8 | 50 |
| 20 | Stephen White | Holden VS Commodore | 0 | | | | | | | | | 16 | 18 | 34 |
| 21 | Jason Bright | Holden VS Commodore | 0 | | | | 24 | | | | | | | 24 |
| 22 | Kevin Heffernan | Holden VS Commodore | 0 | 0 | | | | 8 | 1 | 12 | | | | 21 |
| 23 | Allan McCarthy | Ford EL Falcon | 0 | | | 0 | | | | | 20 | | | 20 |
| 24 | Chris Smerdon | Holden VS Commodore | 0 | 1 | | | | | | | | 4 | 14 | 19 |
| 25 | Paul Romano | Holden VS Commodore | 0 | Ret | 8 | | | | | DNS | | | 2 | 10 |
| 26 | Steve Reed | Holden VS Commodore | 0 | 0 | | | 1 | 8 | | | | | | 9 |
| 27 | Danny Osborne | Ford EL Falcon | 0 | Ret | | | | 1 | | Ret | 7 | 0 | Ret | 8 |
| 28 | John Trimbole | Holden VS Commodore | 0 | Ret | Ret | | | | | 7 | | | Ret | 7 |
| 28 | Kerryn Brewer | Holden VS Commodore | 0 | | | | | | | 6 | | 1 | | 7 |
| 28 | Melinda Price | Holden VS Commodore | 0 | | | | | | | | 2 | | 5 | 7 |
| 31 | Grant Johnson | Holden VS Commodore | 0 | | | | | | | | 6 | | | 6 |
| 32 | Bob Pearson | Holden VS Commodore | 0 | | | | | | 3 | | | | | 3 |
| 33 | Steven Johnson | Holden VS Commodore | 0 | | | 2 | | | | | | | | 2 |
| 33 | David "Truckie" Parsons | Holden VS Commodore | 0 | | | 2 | | | | | | | | 2 |
| 33 | Mike Conway | Holden VS Commodore; Ford EB Falcon | 0 | | | | | 1 | Ret | 1 | | | Ret | 2 |
| 33 | Greg Crick | Holden VS Commodore | 0 | | | | | | 2 | | | | | 2 |
| 33 | Neil Schembri | Holden VR Commodore | 0 | | | | | | 0 | | | | 2 | 2 |
| 33 | John Briggs | Ford EF Falcon | 0 | | | | | | | | | | 2 | 2 |
| 39 | Ray Hislop | Ford EF Falcon | 0 | | 1 | 0 | Ret | | | | | | | 1 |
| 39 | Claude Giorgi | Ford EL Falcon | 0 | | | | | | | | | | 1 | 1 |
| Pos | Driver | Car | Penalty | Cal | Phi | San | Sym | Win | Eas | Lak | Bar | Mal | Ora | Total |

| Colour | Result |
|---|---|
| Gold | Winner |
| Silver | Second place |
| Bronze | Third place |
| Green | Points classification |
| Blue | Non-points classification |
| Blue | Non-classified finish (NC) |
| Purple | Retired, not classified (Ret) |
| Red | Did not qualify (DNQ) |
| Red | Did not pre-qualify (DNPQ) |
| Black | Disqualified (DSQ) |
| White | Did not start (DNS) |
| White | Withdrew (WD) |
| White | Race cancelled (C) |
| Blank | Did not practice (DNP) |
| Blank | Did not arrive (DNA) |
| Blank | Excluded (EX) |

=== Privateers' Cup ===
The Privateers' Cup was open to Category 2 and Category 3 entries only. Points were awarded on a 30–26–24–22–20–18–16–14–12–10–8–6–4–2–1 basis to the top 15 eligible finishers in each race.

| Pos. | Driver | Car |
|---|---|---|
| 1 | John Faulkner | Holden VS Commodore |
| 2 | Mark Poole | Holden VS Commodore |
| 3 | Terry Finnigan | Holden VS Commodore |
| 4 | Darren Hossack | Holden VS Commodore |
| 5 | Trevor Ashby | Holden VS Commodore |

Note: Only the top five positions are shown.

== See also ==
1997 Australian Touring Car season
