= Tony Longhurst Racing =

Tony Longhurst Racing may refer to:

- Paul Morris Motorsport - Australian motor racing team part owned by Tony Longhurst that competed in the Australian Touring Car Championship between 1988 and 1994
- Longhurst Racing - Australian motor racing team that competed in the V8 Supercar series between 1995 and 1998
