= 1996 Australian Touring Car Championship =

Motor racing competition

Seasons
- ← 1995 1997 →

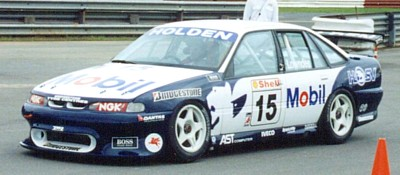
1996 Champion, Craig Lowndes' Holden VR Commodore

The 1996 Australian Touring Car Championship was a CAMS sanctioned motor racing title for drivers of 5.0 Litre Touring Cars complying with Australian Group 3A regulations. The championship, which was the 37th Australian Touring Car Championship, was promoted as the Shell Australian Touring Car Championship. It was contested over ten rounds between January 1996 and June 1996. The championship was contested earlier in the year than usual as much of telecaster Channel 7's broadcast equipment was required for its 1996 Summer Olympics coverage. 1996 was the last year in which Channel 7 would broadcast the championship until 2007, with Network Ten taking over the broadcast rights from the 1997 season onwards.

The championship was won by Craig Lowndes driving a Holden VR Commodore entered by the Holden Racing Team.

== Television coverage ==
Channel 7's coverage was again a same day delayed broadcast which saw Garry Wilkinson return to the coverage as host and eventually as a commentator alongside Mark Oastler after Andy Raymond was moved from the broadcast booth (where he started the season) to the pits and Brad Jones joined the team as their full-time expert.

Mike Raymond retired from broadcasting full-time after the 1995 Bathurst 1000.

== Preseason ==
At the end of 1995, tobacco sponsorship was prohibited by the federal government. A tight sponsorship market resulted in both Gibson Motorsport and Glenn Seton Racing scaling back to one car. Philip Morris sought to circumnavigate this by sponsoring Alan Jones Racing under a generic name.

== Teams and drivers ==
Movements

- Alan Jones moved from Glenn Seton Racing, forming Alan Jones Racing in partnership with Jim and Ross Stone
- Paul Romano joined Alan Jones Racing from Romano Racing
- Greg Crick replaced David Attard at Alcair Racing

Arrivals / returnees

- Garry Rogers Motorsport joined the series with Steven Richards driving an ex Gibson Motorsport VR Commodore
- John Faulkner Racing joined the series with John Faulkner driving an ex Holden Racing Team VR Commodore
- John Sidney Racing joined the series with Max Dumsney driving an ex Glenn Seton Racing EF Falcon
- Longhurst Racing expanded to two cars with a customer EF Falcon for Steve Ellery
- Craig Lowndes replaced Tomas Mezera at the Holden Racing Team
- M3 Motorsport returned to the series for the first time since 1993 with John Cotter and Peter Doulman sharing the driving of an ex Perkins Engineering VP Commodore
- Perkins Engineering expanded to two cars with Russell Ingall joining the series

Departures

- With Gibson Motorsport scaling back to one car, Jim Richards left the series
- 1995 Privateer's Cup winner David Attard did not defend his crown

The following teams and drivers competed in the 1996 Australian Touring Car Championship:

Team	Vehicle	No	Drivers
Dick Johnson Racing	Ford EF Falcon	1	(Australia) John Bowe
Dick Johnson Racing	Ford EF Falcon	17	(Australia) Dick Johnson
Gibson Motorsport	Holden VR Commodore	2	(Australia) Mark Skaife
Lansvale Racing Team	Holden VP Commodore	3	(Australia) Trevor Ashby (Australia) Steve Reed
Wayne Gardner Racing	Holden VR Commodore	4	(Australia) Wayne Gardner
Wayne Gardner Racing	Holden VR Commodore	7	(Australia) Neil Crompton
Holden Racing Team	Holden VR Commodore	05	(Australia) Peter Brock
Holden Racing Team	Holden VR Commodore	15	(Australia) Craig Lowndes
Perkins Engineering	Holden VR Commodore	8	(Australia) Russell Ingall
Perkins Engineering	Holden VR Commodore	11	(Australia) Larry Perkins
Larkham Motor Sport	Ford EF Falcon	10	(Australia) Mark Larkham
Malcolm Stenniken	Holden VR Commodore	14	(Australia) Malcolm Stenniken
Tim Slako	Holden VR Commodore	24	(Australia) Tim Slako
Longhurst Racing	Ford EF Falcon	25	(Australia) Tony Longhurst
Longhurst Racing	Ford EF Falcon	52	(Australia) Steven Ellery
M3 Motorsport	Holden VP Commodore	26	(Australia) John Cotter
M3 Motorsport	Holden VP Commodore	29	(Australia) Peter Doulman
Terry Finnigan	Holden VP Commodore	27	(Australia) Terry Finnigan
Playscape Racing	Ford EF Falcon	28	(Australia) Kevin Waldock
Glenn Seton Racing	Ford EF Falcon	30	(Australia) Glenn Seton
Phil Johnson	Holden VR Commodore	31	(Australia) Grant Johnson
Garry Rogers Motorsport	Holden VR Commodore	32	(New Zealand) Steven Richards
Pro-Duct Racing	Holden VR Commodore	33	(Australia) Bob Pearson
Claude Gorgi	Ford EB Falcon	34	(Australia) Claude Giorgi
Scotty Taylor Racing	Holden VP Commodore	37	(Australia) Bill Attard (Australia) Alan Taylor
James Rosenberg Racing	Holden VR Commodore	38	(Australia) Mark Poole
Challenge Motorsport	Holden VR Commodore	39	(Australia) Chris Smerdon
Garry Willmington Performance	Ford EB Falcon	41	(Australia) Garry Willmington
Mal Rose Racing	Holden VR Commodore	44	(Australia) Mal Rose
John Faulkner Racing	Holden VR Commodore	46	(New Zealand) John Faulkner
Daily Planet Racing	Ford EB Falcon	47	(Australia) John Trimbole (Australia) David Attard
Alcair Racing	Holden VR Commodore	49	(Australia) Greg Crick
Peter McLeod	Holden VR Commodore	50	(Australia) Peter McLeod
David Parsons	Holden VR Commodore	55	(Australia) David "Truckie" Parsons
Novocastrian Motorsport	Holden VP Commodore	62	(Australia) Wayne Russell
Pace Racing	Holden VP Commodore	74	(Australia) Kevin Heffernan
John Sidney Racing	Ford EF Falcon	75	(Australia) Max Dumesny
Cadillac Productions	Holden VP Commodore	79	(Australia) Mike Conway
Shaun Walker	Holden VR Commodore	99	(Australia) Shaun Walker
Alan Jones Racing	Ford EF Falcon	201	(Australia) Paul Romano
Alan Jones Racing	Ford EF Falcon	301	(Australia) Alan Jones

== Race calendar ==
The championship was contested over a ten-round series with three races per round.

Rd.	Circuit	Location / state	Date	Winner	Car	Team	Report
1	Eastern Creek Raceway	Sydney, New South Wales	25 - 27 Jan	Craig Lowndes	Holden VR Commodore	Holden Racing Team	
2	Sandown International Raceway	Melbourne, Victoria	2 - 4 Feb	Craig Lowndes	Holden VR Commodore	Holden Racing Team	
3	Mount Panorama Circuit	Bathurst, New South Wales	23 - 25 Feb	John Bowe	Ford EF Falcon	Dick Johnson Racing	
4	Symmons Plains Raceway	Launceston, Tasmania	15 - 17 Mar	Craig Lowndes	Holden VR Commodore	Holden Racing Team	
5	Phillip Island Grand Prix Circuit	Phillip Island, Victoria	12 - 14 Apr	Larry Perkins	Holden VR Commodore	Perkins Engineering	
6	Calder Park Raceway	Melbourne, Victoria	26 - 28 Apr	Russell Ingall	Holden VR Commodore	Perkins Engineering	
7	Lakeside International Raceway	Brisbane, Queensland	3–5 May	Craig Lowndes	Holden VR Commodore	Holden Racing Team	
8	Barbagallo Raceway	Perth, Western Australia	24–26 May	Craig Lowndes	Holden VR Commodore	Holden Racing Team	
9	Mallala Motor Sport Park	Mallala, South Australia	31 May - 2 Jun	Craig Lowndes	Holden VR Commodore	Holden Racing Team	
10	Oran Park Raceway	Sydney, New South Wales	14 - 16 Jun	Peter Brock	Holden VR Commodore	Holden Racing Team	

== Points system ==
Championship points were awarded on a 20-16-14-12-10-8-6-4-2-1 basis to the top ten finishers in each race.

== Results ==
Pos	Driver	Car	Penalty	Eas.	San.	Mou.	Sym.	Phi.	Cal.	Lak.	Bar.	Mal.	Ora.	Pts
1	Craig Lowndes	Holden VR Commodore	0	56	46	13	60	20	26	60	60	50	32	423
2	John Bowe	Ford EF Falcon	0	32	40	60	36	14	42	34	24	32	30	344
3	Glenn Seton	Ford EF Falcon	0	28	44	20	32	37	30	27	42	4	44	308
4	Peter Brock	Holden VR Commodore	0	10	26	34	48	12	10	32	30	22	60	286
5	Larry Perkins	Holden VR Commodore	0	7	12	32	16	40	30	14	5	22	14	192
6	Russell Ingall	Holden VR Commodore	0	20	26	8	8	22	52	14	8	18	7	183
7	Wayne Gardner	Holden VR Commodore	0	36	14	14	2	18	20	4	22	28	24	182
8	Alan Jones	Ford EF Falcon	0	14	1	10	14	25	0	36	28	32	20	180
9	Mark Skaife	Holden VR Commodore	0	8	40	16	16	Ret	16	10	26	15	30	177
10	Dick Johnson	Ford EF Falcon	0	22	10	40	7	28	13	28	Ret	18	7	173
11	Tony Longhurst	Ford EF Falcon	0	12	Ret	10	11	12	26	8	20	Ret	1	100
12	Steven Richards	Holden VR Commodore	0	0	12	0	2	16	8	9	5	24	8	84
13	Neil Crompton	Holden VR Commodore	0	22	6	21	24						Ret	73
14	Paul Romano	Ford EF Falcon	0	10	1	Ret	Ret	13	2	3	2	Ret	Ret	31
15	Steve Ellery	Ford EF Falcon	0	0	1	0	1	12	1	0	5	6	2	28
16	Max Dumesny	Ford EF Falcon	0					8	Ret			5	DNS	13
17	John Faulkner	Holden VR Commodore	0					2	3	Ret			Ret	5
18	Greg Crick	Holden VR Commodore	0	1	0	1	1	Ret	0	Ret	0	Ret	Ret	3
19	Kevin Waldock	Ford EF Falcon	0								Ret	2		2
20	Terry Finnigan	Holden VP Commodore	0	1		0							0	1
20	Mark Poole	Holden VP Commodore	0		0				0			1		1
Pos	Driver	Car	Penalty	Eas.	San.	Mou.	Sym.	Phi.	Cal.	Lak.	Bar.	Mal.	Ora.	Pts

Colour	Result
Gold	Winner
Silver	Second place
Bronze	Third place
Green	Points classification
Blue	Non-points classification
Blue	Non-classified finish (NC)
Purple	Retired, not classified (Ret)
Red	Did not qualify (DNQ)
Red	Did not pre-qualify (DNPQ)
Black	Disqualified (DSQ)
White	Did not start (DNS)
White	Withdrew (WD)
White	Race cancelled (C)
Blank	Did not practice (DNP)
Blank	Did not arrive (DNA)
Blank	Excluded (EX)

=== Auto Action Privateers Cup ===
Position	Driver	Car	Points
1	Steven Richards	Holden Commodore VR	538
2	Steven Ellery	Ford Falcon EF	431
3	Greg Crick	Holden Commodore VR	364
4	Max Dumsney	Ford Falcon EF	137
5	David Parsons	Holden Commodore VR	137
6	Trevor Ashby	Holden Commodore VP	136
7	John Faulkner	Holden Commodore VR	132
8	Terry Finnigan	Holden Commodore VP	122
9	John Trimbole	Ford Falcon EB	106
10	Mark Poole	Holden Commodore VR	94
11	Chris Smerdon	Holden Commodore VR	88
12	Bob Pearson	Holden Commodore VR	64
13	Kevin Heffernan	Holden Commodore VP	59
14	Steve Reed	Holden Commodore VP	58
15	Wayne Russell	Holden Commodore VP	57
16	Peter McLeod	Holden Commodore VR	47
17	Mal Rose	Holden Commodore VR	44
18	Mike Conway	Holden Commodore VP	36
19	Tim Slako	Holden Commodore VR	32
20	Grant Johnson	Holden Commodore VR	30
21	Scotty Taylor	Holden Commodore VP	28
22	Kevin Waldock	Ford Falcon EF	28
23	David Attard	Ford Falcon EB	25
24	Peter Doulman	Holden Commodore VP	21
25	Shaun Walker	Holden Commodore VR	20
26	John Cotter	Holden Commodore VP	18
27	Bill Attard	Holden Commodore VP	12
28	Claude Giorgi	Ford Falcon EB	6
29	Garry Willmington	Ford Falcon EB	6
30	Malcolm Stenniken	Holden Commodore VR	4

== See also ==
- 1996 Australian Touring Car season
- 1996 Tickford 500
- 1996 AMP Bathurst 1000
