= 1998 Australian Touring Car season =

Seasons
- ← 1997 1999 →

The 1998 Australian Touring Car season was the 39th year of touring car racing in Australia since the first runnings of the Australian Touring Car Championship and the fore-runner of the present day Bathurst 1000, the Armstrong 500.

Two major touring car categories raced in Australia during 1998, V8 Supercar and Super Touring. Between them there were 23 touring car race meetings held during 1998; a ten-round series for V8 Supercars, the 1998 Australian Touring Car Championship (ATCC); an eight-round series for Super Touring, the 1998 Australian Super Touring Championship (ASTC); support programme events at the 1998 Australian Grand Prix and 1998 Honda Indy 300 and three stand alone long distance races, nicknamed 'enduros'.

== Results and standings ==
=== Race calendar ===
The 1998 Australian touring car season consisted of 23 events.

Date	Series	Circuit	City / state	Winner	Team	Car	Report
1 Feb	ATCC Round 1	Sandown International Raceway	Melbourne, Victoria	Craig Lowndes	Holden Racing Team	Holden VS Commodore	
8 Feb	ATCC Round 2	Symmons Plains Raceway	Launceston, Tasmania	Mark Skaife	Holden Racing Team	Holden VS Commodore	
6–8 Mar	Super Touring GT-P Race	Albert Park street circuit	Melbourne, Victoria	Cameron McConville	Brad Jones Racing	Audi A4 Quattro	
6–8 Mar	TAC V8 Supercar Showdown	Albert Park street circuit	Melbourne, Victoria	Russell Ingall	Perkins Engineering	Holden VS Commodore	
29 Mar	ATCC Round 3	Lakeside International Raceway	Brisbane, Queensland	Russell Ingall	Perkins Engineering	Holden VS Commodore	
5 Apr	ASTC Round 1	Calder Park Raceway	Melbourne, Victoria	Cameron McConville	Brad Jones Racing	Audi A4 Quattro	
19 Apr	ATCC Round 4	Phillip Island Grand Prix Circuit	Phillip Island, Victoria	Craig Lowndes	Holden Racing Team	Holden VS Commodore	
27 Apr	ASTC Round 2	Oran Park Raceway	Sydney, New South Wales	Brad Jones	Brad Jones Racing	Audi A4 Quattro	
3 May	ATCC Round 5	Winton Motor Raceway	Benalla, Victoria	John Bowe	Dick Johnson Racing	Ford EL Falcon	
17 May	ASTC Round 3	Phillip Island Grand Prix Circuit	Phillip Island, Victoria	Jim Richards	Volvo Dealer Racing	Volvo S40	
24 May	ATCC Round 6	Mallala Motor Sport Park	Adelaide, South Australia	Russell Ingall	Perkins Engineering	Holden VS Commodore	
31 May	ATCC Round 7	Barbagallo Raceway	Perth, Western Australia	Craig Lowndes	Holden Racing Team	Holden VS Commodore	
7 Jun	ASTC Round 4	Eastern Creek Raceway	Sydney, New South Wales	Brad Jones	Brad Jones Racing	Audi A4 Quattro	
21 Jun	ATCC Round 8	Calder Park Raceway	Melbourne, Victoria	Craig Lowndes	Holden Racing Team	Holden VS Commodore	
28 Jun	ASTC Round 5	Lakeside International Raceway	Brisbane, Queensland	Brad Jones	Brad Jones Racing	Audi A4 Quattro	
19 Jul	ATCC Round 9	Hidden Valley Raceway	Darwin, Northern Territory	Russell Ingall	Perkins Engineering	Holden VT Commodore	
19 Jul	ASTC Round 6	Mallala Motor Sport Park	Adelaide, South Australia	Cameron McConville	Brad Jones Racing	Audi A4 Quattro	
2 Aug	ATCC Round 10	Oran Park Raceway	Sydney, New South Wales	Craig Lowndes	Holden Racing Team	Holden VT Commodore	
9 Aug	ASTC Round 7	Winton Motor Raceway	Benalla, Victoria	Cameron McConville	Brad Jones Racing	Audi A4 Quattro	
30 Aug	ASTC Round 8	Oran Park Raceway	Sydney, New South Wales	Brad Jones	Brad Jones Racing	Audi A4 Quattro	
13 Sep	Tickfrd Sandown 500	Sandown International Raceway	Melbourne, Victoria	Russell Ingall; Larry Perkins	Perkins Engineering	Holden VT Commodore	report
4 Oct	AMP Bathurst 1000	Mount Panorama Circuit	Bathurst, New South Wales	Rickard Rydell; Jim Richards	Volvo Dealer Racing	Volvo S40	report
17–18 Oct	Hog's Breath Cafe V8 Supercar Challenge	Surfers Paradise Street Circuit	Surfers Paradise, Queensland	Mark Larkham	Larkham Motor Sport	Ford EL Falcon	
15 Nov	FAI 1000 Classic	Mount Panorama Circuit	Bathurst, New South Wales	Jason Bright; Steven Richards	Stone Brothers Racing	Ford EL Falcon	report

=== Super Touring GT-P Race ===
This meeting was a support event of the 1998 Australian Grand Prix. The thin Super Touring field was bolstered by cars from the Australian GT-Production Car Championship (indicated in italics).

Driver	No.	Team	Car	Race 1	Race 2
(Australia) Cameron McConville	2	Brad Jones Racing	Audi A4 Quattro	1	1
(New Zealand) Jim Richards	5	Volvo Dealer Racing	Volvo S40	8	2
(Australia) Brad Jones	1	Brad Jones Racing	Audi A4 Quattro	2	3
(Australia) Cameron McLean	12	Greenfield Mowers Racing	BMW 320i	3	4
(Australia) Peter Hills	88	Knight Racing	Ford Mondeo	4	5
(Australia) Paul Gover	3	Brad Jones Racing	Audi A4 Quattro	5	6
(Australia) Domenic Beninca	3	Beninca Racing	Porsche 993 RSCS	6	7
(Australia) Anthony Robson	99		BMW 318i	7	8
(Australia) Jenni Thompson	89	Knight Racing	Ford Mondeo	11	9
(Australia) Simon Froude			Porsche 993 RSCS	9	10
(Australia) Peter McKay	27	House of Maserati	Maserati Ghibli Cup	10	11
(Australia) Trevor Haines	61		Subaru Impreza WRX	13	12
(Australia) Richard Davis	25		HSV GTS-R	14	13
(Australia) Paul Nelson	16	Bob Holden Motors	BMW 318i	12	DNF
(Australia) Murray Carter	18		Nissan 200SX Turbo	DNS	DNF
(Australia) Ed Aitken	8		Porsche 993 RSCS	DNF	DNS
(Australia) Milton Leslight	15		Toyota Carina	DNS	DNS
(Australia) Robert Porter	38		Subaru Impreza WRX	DNS	DNS

=== TAC V8 Supercar Showdown ===
This meeting was a support event of the 1998 Australian Grand Prix.

Driver	No.	Team	Car	Race 1	Race 2	Race 3	Race 4
(Australia) Russell Ingall	8	Perkins Engineering	Holden VS Commodore	1	1	1	1
(Australia) John Bowe	18	Dick Johnson Racing	Ford EL Falcon	3	2	2	2
(Australia) Larry Perkins	11	Perkins Engineering	Holden VS Commodore	12	4	4	3
(Australia) Mark Skaife	50	Holden Racing Team	Holden VS Commodore	2	3	3	4
(Australia) Craig Lowndes	15	Holden Racing Team	Holden VS Commodore	DNF	11	8	5
(Australia) Glenn Seton	1	Glenn Seton Racing	Ford EL Falcon	6	5	5	6
(New Zealand) John Faulkner	46	John Faulkner Racing	Holden VS Commodore	9	8	11	7
(New Zealand) Steven Richards	34	Garry Rogers Motorsport	Holden VS Commodore	36	19	7	8
(Australia) Dick Johnson	17	Dick Johnson Racing	Ford EL Falcon	10	6	6	9
(Australia) Greg Crick	49	Greg Crick Motorsport	Holden VS Commodore	DNF	15	12	10
(Australia) Wayne Gardner	96	Wayne Gardner Racing	Holden VS Commodore	8	10	DNF	11
(Australia) Tomas Mezera	32	Challenge Motorsport	Holden VS Commodore	17	DNF	17	12
(Australia) Anthony Tratt	75	John Sidney Racing	Ford EL Falcon	19	DNF	18	13
(Australia) Rodney Forbes	28	Glenn Seton Racing	Ford EL Falcon	20	16	DNF	14
(Australia) Darren Hossack	7	Gibson Motorsport	Holden VS Commodore	14	13	DNF	15
(Australia) Mal Rose	44	Mal Rose Racing	Holden VS Commodore	21	20	20	16
(Australia) Ray Hislop	23		Ford EF Falcon	25	23	23	17
(Australia) Mick Donaher	80	Clive Wiseman Racing	Holden VS Commodore	23	DNF	21	18
(Australia) Wayne Russell	45		Holden VS Commodore	35	25	24	19
(Australia) Steve Ellery	2	Gibson Motorsport	Holden VS Commodore	13	9	DNF	20
(Australia) Neil Schembri	36	Schembri Motorsport	Holden VS Commodore	27	27	22	21
(Australia) Garry Willmington	41	Simon Emerzidis	Holden VR Commodore	30	30	25	22
(Australia) Mike Conway	79	Cadillac Productions	Ford EL Falcon	34	DNF	DNF	23
(Australia) D'arcy Russell	45	Rod Smith Racing	Holden VS Commodore	29	DNF	DNS	24
(Australia) Mike Imrie	14	Imrie Motor Sport	Holden VS Commodore	31	28	DNS	25
(Australia) Barry Morcom	52		Holden VP Commodore	32	29	26	26
(Australia) Mark Poole	38	James Rosenberg Racing	Holden VS Commodore	16	12	DNF	27
(Australia) Trevor Ashby	3	Lansvale Racing Team	Holden VS Commodore	18	17	13	28
(Australia) Paul Romano	24	Romano Racing	Holden VS Commodore	DNF	DNS	16	DNF
(Australia) Jason Bargwanna	35	Garry Rogers Motorsport	Holden VS Commodore	7	7	DNS	DNF
(Australia) John Cotter	26	M3 Motorsport	Holden VS Commodore	28	DNF	DNS	DNF
(Australia) Mark Larkham	10	Larkham Motor Sport	Ford EL Falcon	11	14	9	DNF
(Australia) Paul Weel	43	Paul Weel Racing	Ford EL Falcon	33	24	19	DNF
(Australia) Wayne Park	51	Charles Ryman	Ford EL Falcon	DNF	21	15	DNF
(Australia) Terry Finnigan	27		Holden VS Commodore	15	DNF	14	DNF
(Australia) Tony Longhurst	25	Longhurst Racing	Ford EL Falcon	4	DNF	10	DNS
(Australia) Darren Pate	31	Gibson Motorsport	Holden VS Commodore	22	18	DNF	DNS
(Australia) Kerryn Brewer	16	Perkins Engineering	Holden VS Commodore	26	22	DNF	DNS
(Australia) Danny Osborne	22	Colourscan Motorsport	Ford EL Falcon	24	26	DNS	DNS
(Australia) Jason Bright	4	Stone Brothers Racing	Ford EL Falcon	5	DNF	DNS	DNS

=== Hog's Breath V8 Supercar Challenge ===
This meeting was a support event of the 1998 Honda Indy 300.

Driver	No.	Team	Car	Race 1	Race 2
(Australia) Mark Larkham	10	Larkham Motor Sport	Ford EL Falcon	1	1
(Australia) Mark Skaife	50	Holden Racing Team	Holden VS Commodore	3	2
(Australia) Jason Bargwanna	35	Garry Rogers Motorsport	Holden VS Commodore	5	3
(Australia) Tony Longhurst	25	Longhurst Racing	Ford EL Falcon	4	4
(Australia) Larry Perkins	11	Perkins Engineering	Holden VS Commodore	6	5
(Australia) Steven Johnson	17	Dick Johnson Racing	Ford EL Falcon	9	6
(New Zealand) John Faulkner	46	John Faulkner Racing	Holden VS Commodore	7	7
(Australia) Russell Ingall	8	Perkins Engineering	Holden VS Commodore	DNF	8
(Australia) Alan Jones	9	Longhurst Racing	Ford EL Falcon	8	9
(Australia) Neil Crompton	5	Glenn Seton Racing	Ford EL Falcon	DNF	10
(Australia) Wayne Gardner	96	Wayne Gardner Racing	Holden VS Commodore	14	11
(Australia) Garth Tander	34	Garry Rogers Motorsport	Holden VS Commodore	DNF	12
(Australia) Tomas Mezera	32	Tomas Mezera Motorsport	Holden VT Commodore	13	13
(Australia) John Briggs	70	John Briggs Motorsport	Ford EL Falcon	11	14
(Australia) Kevin Heffernan	74	PACE Racing	Holden VS Commodore	DNF	15
(Australia) Jason Bright	4	Stone Brothers Racing	Ford EL Falcon	2	16
(Australia) Dean Crosswell	49	Greg Crick Motorsport	Holden VS Commodore	12	17
(Australia) Simon Emerzidis	54	Simon Emerzidis	Ford EL Falcon	DNF	18
(Australia) Paul Romano	24	Romano Racing	Holden VS Commodore	10	DNF
(Australia) Steve Reed	3	Lansvale Racing Team	Holden VS Commodore	DNF	DNF
(Australia) Craig Lowndes	1	Holden Racing Team	Holden VS Commodore	DNF	DNS
