= Alan Jones Racing =

Australian auto racing team

- Team Principal: Alan Jones; Jim Stone; Ross Stone
- Debut: 1996
- Final Season: 1997
- Round wins: 0

Alan Jones Racing was a motorsport team contesting the Australian Touring Car Championship. At the end of 1997 Alan Jones sold his share of the team to Jim and Ross Stone who renamed it Stone Brothers Racing.

== History ==
=== Formation ===
At the 1995 Sandown 500 it was revealed that Alan Jones had concluded a deal with Dick Johnson Racing engineers Jim and Ross Stone to form a new team, with backing controversially from Glenn Seton Racing sponsor Philip Morris, for whom Jones drove.

=== 1996 ===
Named Alan Jones Racing, the team built two Ford EF Falcons to debut at Round 1 of the 1996 championship, #201 for Paul Romano and #301 for Jones, with Andrew Miedecke and Allan Grice joining the team for the endurance races.

From January 1996 the Federal Government had outlawed the sponsorship of sporting events by tobacco companies. Thus Philip Morris could still sponsor a team but not directly market any of its products, resulting in the team being branded as Pack Leader Racing. After some teething problems with brakes in the opening rounds, the team began to move up the field with Jones leading during the early stages of the Bathurst 1000 before the car caught fire on lap 25.

For two races in New Zealand at the end 1996 the team had local sponsorship with #6 driven by Paul Radisich and #9 by Jones.

=== 1997 ===
Having lost the Philip Morris sponsorship, in 1997 the team ran #9 for Jones with sponsorship from Komatsu and Pirtek, and a customer car for Mark Larkham as #10 with Mitre 10 sponsorship. Both cars upgraded to Ford EL Falcon specifications. Larkham was involved in a high speed start line crash with former team driver Paul Romano at round 2 at Phillip Island which saw a new car completed for the next round. Jones won a heat at the final round at Oran Park.

For the endurance races Jason Bright drove with Jones with the pair joined by Scott Pruett at the Bathurst 1000. Andrew Miedecke rejoined the team to partner Larkham, finishing 3rd at Bathurst.

=== Demise ===
At the end of 1997 Alan Jones sold his share of the team to Jim and Ross Stone who renamed it Stone Brothers Racing.
