= Longhurst Racing =

Australian motor racing team

- Manufacturer: Ford
- Team Principal: Tony Longhurst
- Race Drivers: Tony Longhurst (1995-99); Wayne Park (1995); Steven Ellery (1996-97); Charlie O'Brien (1997); Alan Jones (1998); Geoff Brabham (1998); Adam Macrow (1998-99)
- Chassis: Falcon EF; Falcon EL; Falcon AU
- Debut: 1995

Longhurst Racing was an Australian motor racing team that competed in the V8 Supercar series between 1995 and 1999.

== History ==
At the end of 1994, Tony Longhurst sold his share in LoGaMo Racing, the team he had established in 1988 with Frank Gardner, to Gardner and Terry Morris. This was driven by Longhurst's desire to remain in the Australian Touring Car Championship series while his fellow shareholders wanted to compete in Super Touring.

With the support of Castrol and Ford, Longhurst established a new team on the Gold Coast to race in the 1995 Australian Touring Car season, with a Ford Falcon EF. Longhurst finished in 11th place. He then teamed with Wayne Park to finish 4th at the Sandown 500 but the pair could only manage 9th at the Bathurst 1000.

In 1996, the team expanded to two cars with the addition of a customer Falcon EL for Steven Ellery. Longhurst would again finish in 11th place. He then teamed with Ellery to again finish in 4th place at the Sandown 500. The pair then went on to finish 3rd at the Bathurst 1000.

In 1997, the team again fielded two cars, but a mid-season split with Ellery saw the team return to a one car operation. In 1998, Alan Jones joined the team, however it would be round 3 before he debuted while a new Ford Falcon EL was built. In 1999, the team only ran a single car again, a Ford Falcon AU.

At the end of 1999, Longhurst sold the team to Brad Jones Racing and moved to Stone Brothers Racing as an employed driver.

Longhurst attempted to re-enter the championship in 2005 by purchasing a licence from Team Dynamik, resulting in a lengthy legal battle.
