= Ford Falcon (XF) =

Australian full-size car

Ford XF Falcon
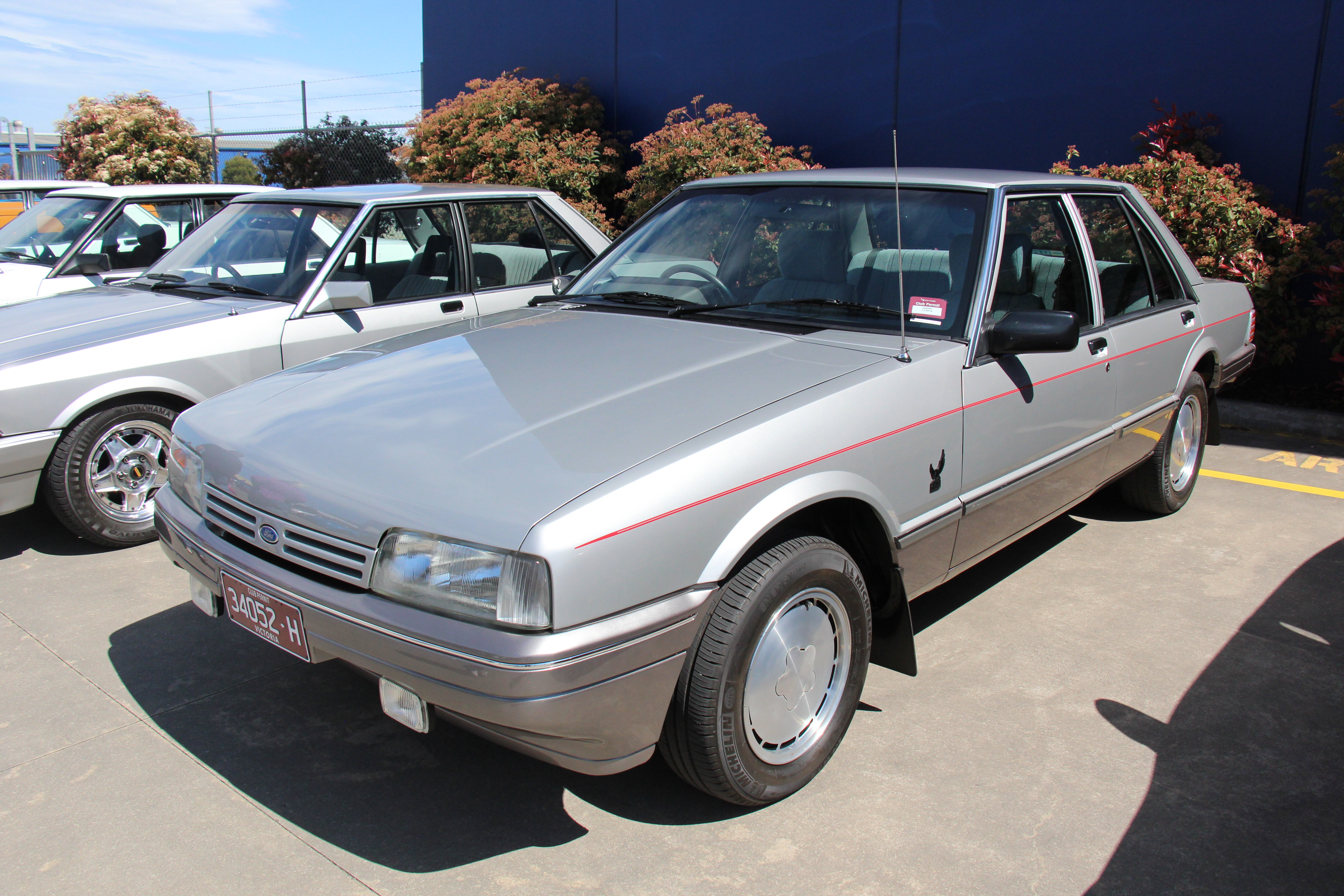
- Ford XF Falcon 25th anniversary sedan

Overview
- Manufacturer: Ford Australia
- Also called: Nissan Ute (XFN) (utility 1988–1992)
- Production: October 1984 – February 1988 (sedan, wagon); October 1984 – March 1993 (utility, panel van)

Body and chassis
- Class: Full-size
- Body style: 2-door coupé utility 2-door panel van 4-door sedan 5-door station wagon
- Related: Ford ZL Fairlane; Ford FE LTD

Powertrain
- Engine: 3.3 L I6; 4.1 L I6 (Carburetor); 4.1 L I6 (EFI)
- Transmission: 3-speed automatic (column or floor shift) Borg-Warner BW-40 (1984-88) or BW-51 (1988-93); 3-speed manual (column shift, BW-0501); 4-speed manual (floor shift, BW-0503 or 0506); 5-speed manual (floor shift, BW-0507)

Dimensions
- Length: 4,775 mm (188.0 in)
- Width: 1,860 mm (73.2 in)
- Height: 1,367 mm (53.8 in)
- Kerb weight: 1,333 kg (2,939 lb)

Chronology
- Predecessor: XE Falcon
- Successor: EA Falcon (sedan, wagon); XG Falcon (utility, panel van)

The Ford Falcon (XF) is a full-sized car that was produced by Ford Australia from 1984 to 1988, with the utility and panel vans running through to March 1993. It was the third iteration of the fourth generation of the Falcon and also included the Ford Fairmont (XF)—the luxury-oriented version.

== Overview ==
The XF sedan and wagon range was sold between October 1984 and February 1988.

In 1980, with high fuel prices in the wake of the 1979 oil crisis leading market sentiment in favour of smaller cars, Ford Australia planned to phase out the full-size, rear-wheel drive Falcon after the 1982 XE model. It was to be replaced by a smaller front-wheel drive car derived from the Ford Telstar/Mazda 626 platform, in a program dubbed Capricorn. However, the market success of the XD Falcon against the smaller Holden Commodore saw Bill Dix, who became CEO in 1981, cancel the program. Ford instead began development of the EA26 Falcon program, a new full-size, rear-wheel drive car range. The XF Falcon was conceived as an interim facelift for the XE Falcon until the all-new fifth-generation Falcon was ready to go on sale.

The XF Falcon continued the sales leadership of its predecessor. It remains Ford Australia's best-selling Falcon model ever with 278,101 built.

The production total was boosted by a prolonged run of the utility and panel van models. Ford had not developed an EA26 Falcon-based replacement for the XF commercial vehicle range, intending to discontinue it due to declining sales as buyers increasingly chose commercial vehicles from Japanese makers, against which the Falcon was priced some 30 per cent higher. However, the strengthening of the yen against the Australian dollar in the mid 1980s eliminated the price advantage of the Japanese imports. This led to a sales revival for the Falcon commercial range such that by January 1987, Ford announced its intention to continue manufacturing the range beyond 1988. After five additional years of production, the XF commercial range was further updated into the 1993 XG and subsequent 1996 XH models, which sold alongside the fifth-generation Ford Falcon sedans and wagons.

== Powertrains ==
XF models were available with a choice of 3.3 or 4.1-litre engine six-cylinder engines. The 4.1-litre unit was standard on Fairmont models, and standard on the Falcon GL commercial range.

Power and torque outputs for the carburetted 3.3 and 4.1 litre engines saw little or no change from the preceding XE series; engineering revisions were aimed at improving fuel economy and driveability. The 3.3 litre engine's maximum power and torque outputs remained at 90 kW (120 hp) and 240 N⋅m (180 ft⋅lb). Maximum power for the 4.1 litre engine decreased slightly from 105 to 103 kW (141 to 138 hp), while torque increased from 310 to 316 N⋅m (229 to 233 ft⋅lb)

The optional 4.1 litre EFI engine underwent a significant upgrade for the XF series, with a switch from Bosch Jetronic LE to Ford's EEC IV electronic fuel injection system. Maximum power output increased from 111 kW (149 hp) to 120 kW (160 hp), and maximum torque increased from 325 N⋅m (240 ft⋅lb) to 333 N⋅m (246 ft⋅lb). An XF Falcon S-Pack equipped with the EFI engine and four-speed manual transmission tested by Wheels magazine in 1984 accelerated from 0 to 100 km/h (62 mph) in 9.3 seconds, ran the standing 400 metres (0.25 mi) in 16.4 seconds, and ran to its 4500 rpm redline in fourth gear for a top speed of 190 km/h (118.1 mph). These performance metrics were only marginally behind the respective 8.9 seconds, 16.3 seconds and 194 km/h (120.5 mph) recorded for a 1982 XE Fairmont Ghia ESP equipped with a 5.8 litre V8 and four-speed manual transmission.

From 1 January 1986, Australian Design Rule 37 came into effect, requiring all new cars to be equipped for operation with unleaded petrol. ADR 37 specified emissions standards that Ford met by the fitting the Falcon with a catalytic converter, and Falcon engines were modified for running on regular grade 91 RON unleaded fuel. Power and torque outputs for the carburetted engines fell slightly; the 3.3 now produced a maximum 88 kW (118 hp) and 235 N⋅m (173 ft⋅lb), and the 4.1 produced a maximum 97.5 kW (130.7 hp) and 316 N⋅m (233 ft⋅lb). Conversely, maximum power output from the 4.1 EFI engine increased slightly to 121 kW (162 hp), although torque fell to 325 N⋅m (240 ft⋅lb).

Transmissions available were three-speed column shift manual (offered only on base-spec vehicles without power steering) four or five-speed floor-shift manual, or the much more popular three-speed automatic with the selector located either on the floor or the column. The Falcon GL sedan featured a four-speed manual as the standard transmission, the three-speed floor-shift automatic was standard on Fairmont models. In three-seat utilities and vans, the three-speed column-shift manual was standard.

In October 1986, a further update was released, which saw power steering and four-wheel disc brakes become standard across the XF passenger car range, with the three-speed column-shift manual now only available on commercial vehicles. At this time, the availability of the five-speed manual transmission, previously only available with the 3.3 litre engine, was extended to both carburetted and fuel-injected 4.1 litre engines. Equipped with a 4.1 litre engine and five-speed transmission, the Falcon GL sedan's fuel economy was quoted as 11.5 l/100 km (25 mpg_{‑imp}) city cycle and 8 l/100 km (35 mpg_{‑imp}) highway cycle.

With the replacement of the XF Falcon passenger car range with the EA model in March 1988, the powertrain options for the remaining XF Falcon utility and panel van range were rationalised to the carburetted 4.1 litre as the only available engine, with a choice of three-speed manual (discontinued by 1992), five-speed manual, or three-speed automatic transmissions.

== Specification levels ==
All models across the Falcon/Fairmont range saw updates with the introduction of the XF, with new interiors featuring colour-coded dashboards and steering wheels, moulded door trims, improved seats with padded headrests, and a ski port in the rear seat of all sedan models. Equipment upgrades across the range included intermittent wiper setting, digital clocks, trip meters, upgraded audio systems, and improved ventilation and/or air-conditioning systems.

The range included:

- Falcon (utility and panel van)
- Falcon GL (utility, panel van, sedan, and wagon)
- Falcon GLS Ute (utility)
- Fairmont (sedan and wagon)
- Fairmont Ghia (sedan and wagon): the luxury Ghia featured a 4.1-litre fuel-injected or carburettor inline six-cylinder engine, and a trip computer that calculated fuel consumption and driving times, among other things. The drive line consisted of a BW40 three-speed automatic with either a 2.77 or 2.92 limited-slip differential and four-wheel disc brakes. A wagon variant of the Ghia was made available from October 1986.

An optional "S" pack was available on Falcon GL models, featuring body stripes, fog lamps, styled wheels, Falcon "S" badging, steering rake adjustment, driver's lumbar support, driver's seat tilt and footrest, and sports instrument cluster.

Ford produced some limited-edition, value-packaged vehicles during the XF series, including the Falcon Silver Edition sedan of 1985 to commemorate the 25th anniversary of the Ford Falcon in Australia. Also, a six-seater GL-based Falcon Family Edition sedan and wagon were offered in 1986. These limited-edition vehicles featured unique versions of two-tone "style-tone" paintwork.

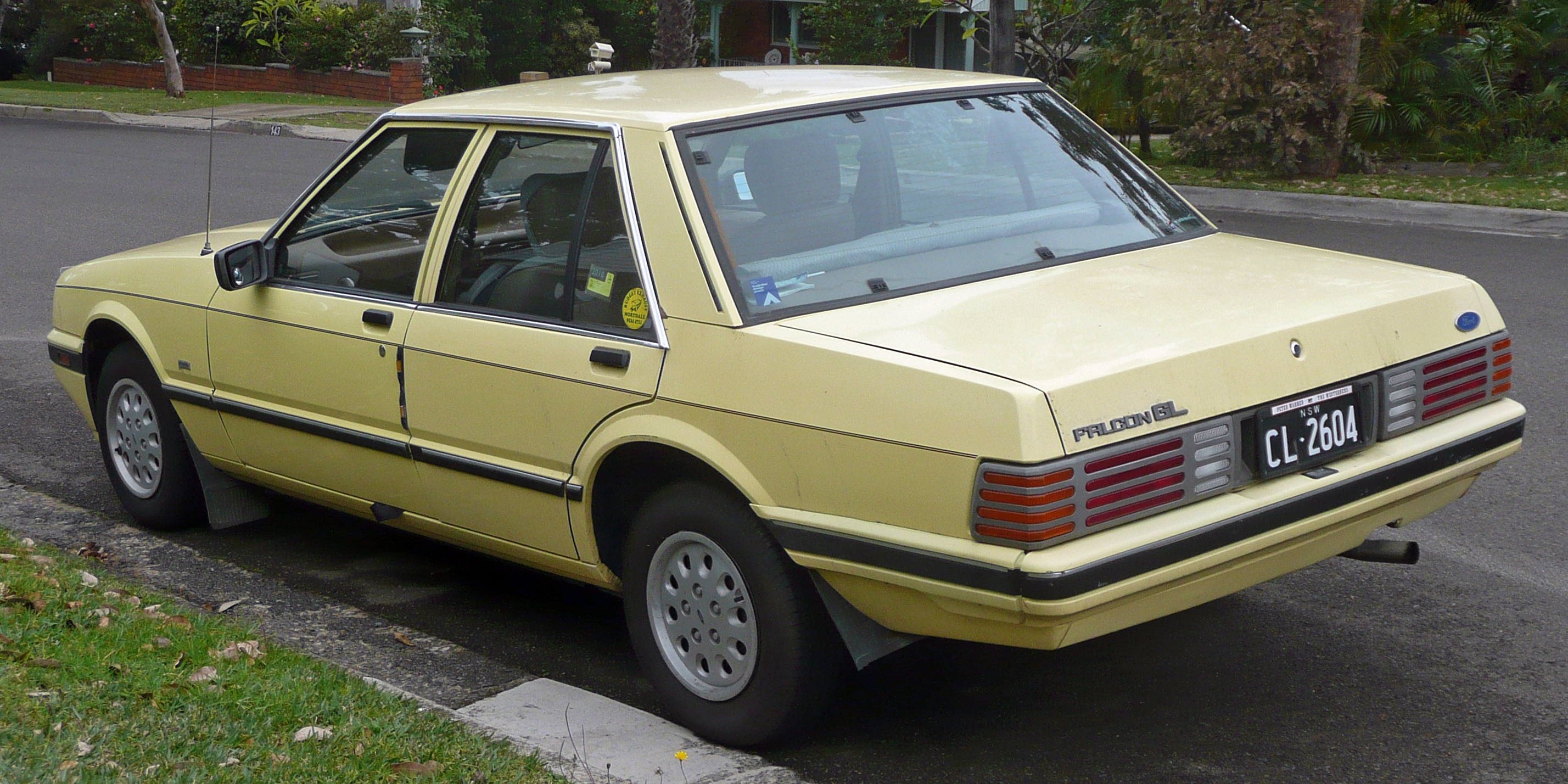
1986–1988 Ford Falcon GL sedan

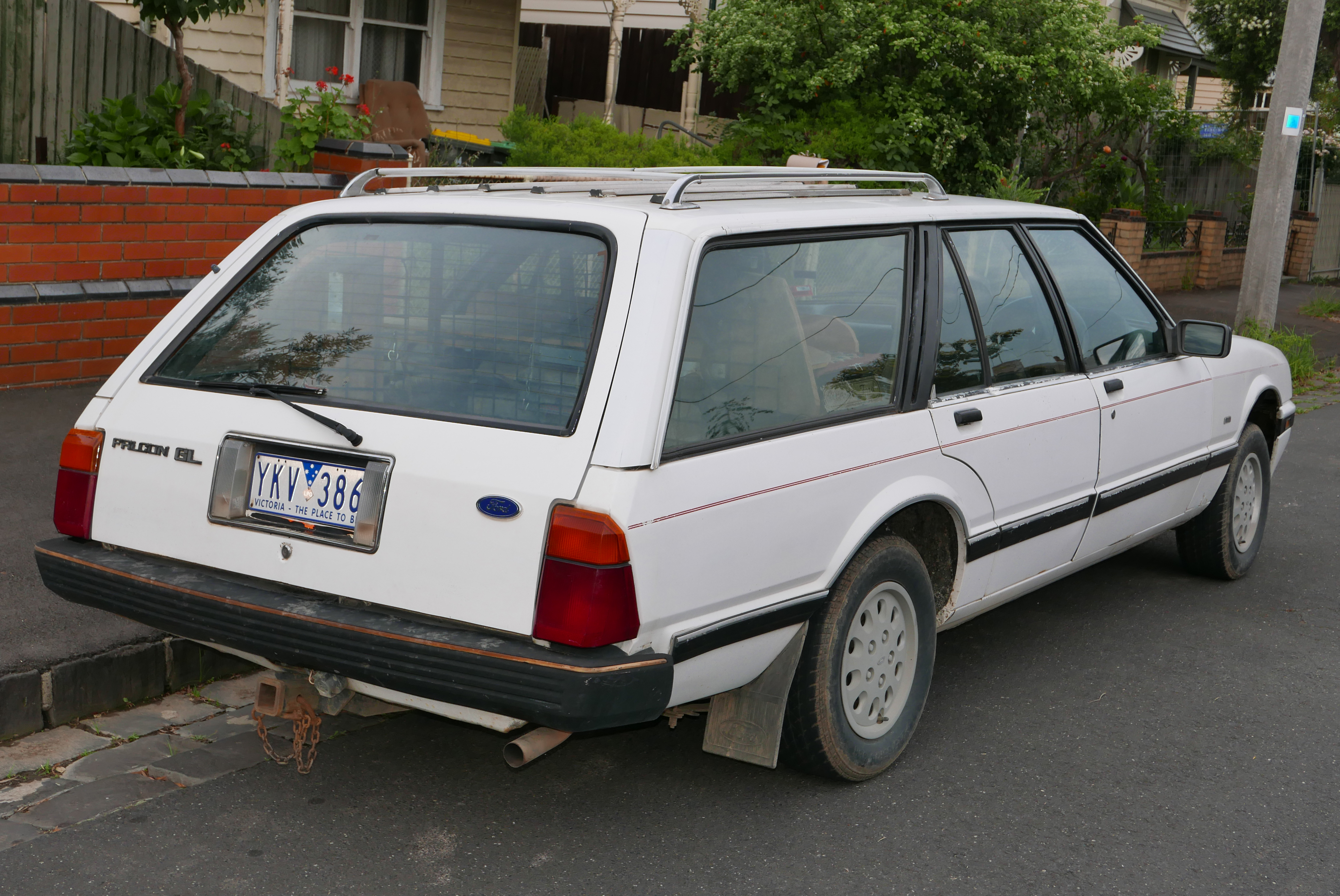
1987 Ford Falcon GL wagon

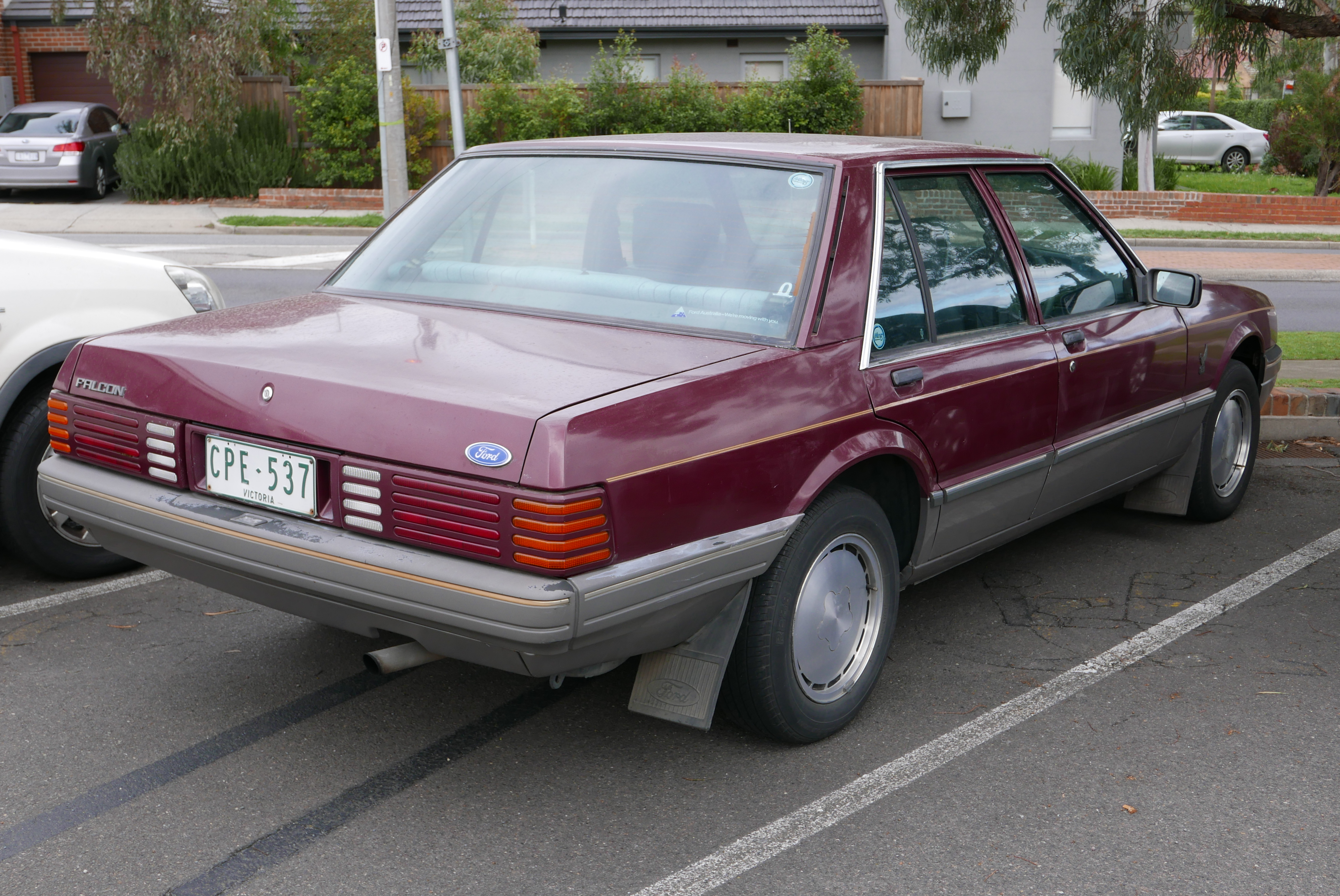
1985 Ford Falcon Silver Anniversary sedan

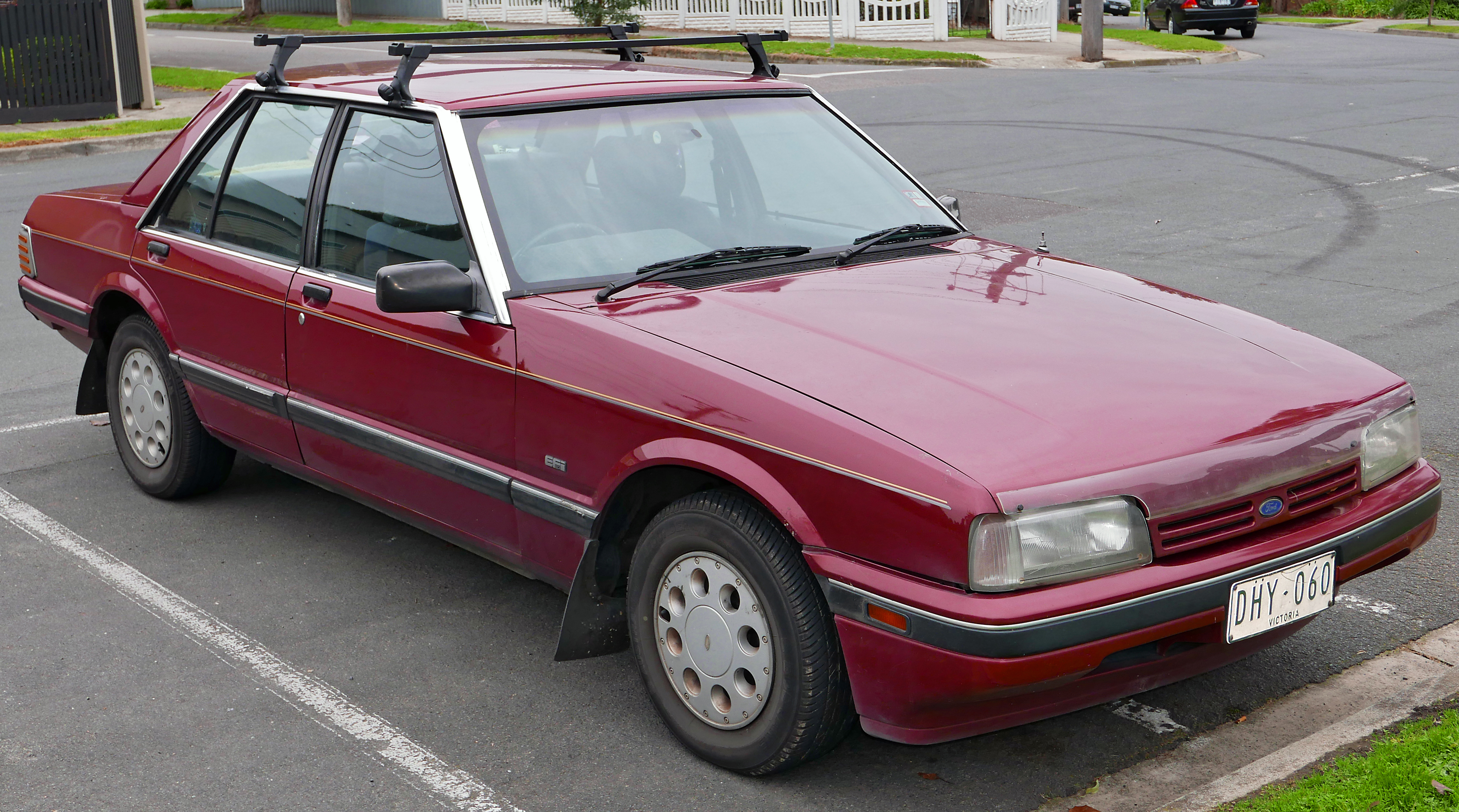
Ford Fairmont sedan

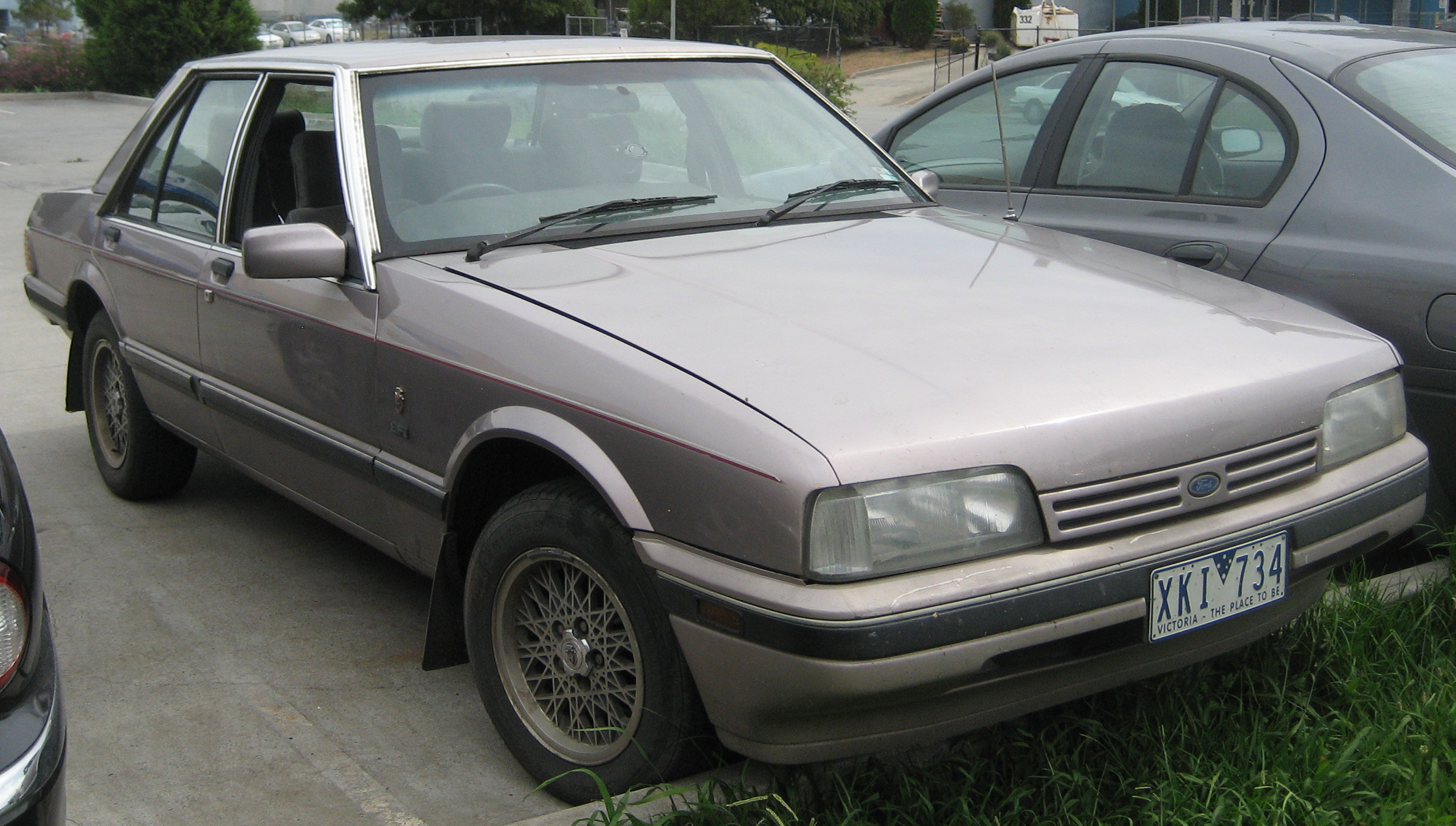
1986–1988 Ford Fairmont Ghia sedan

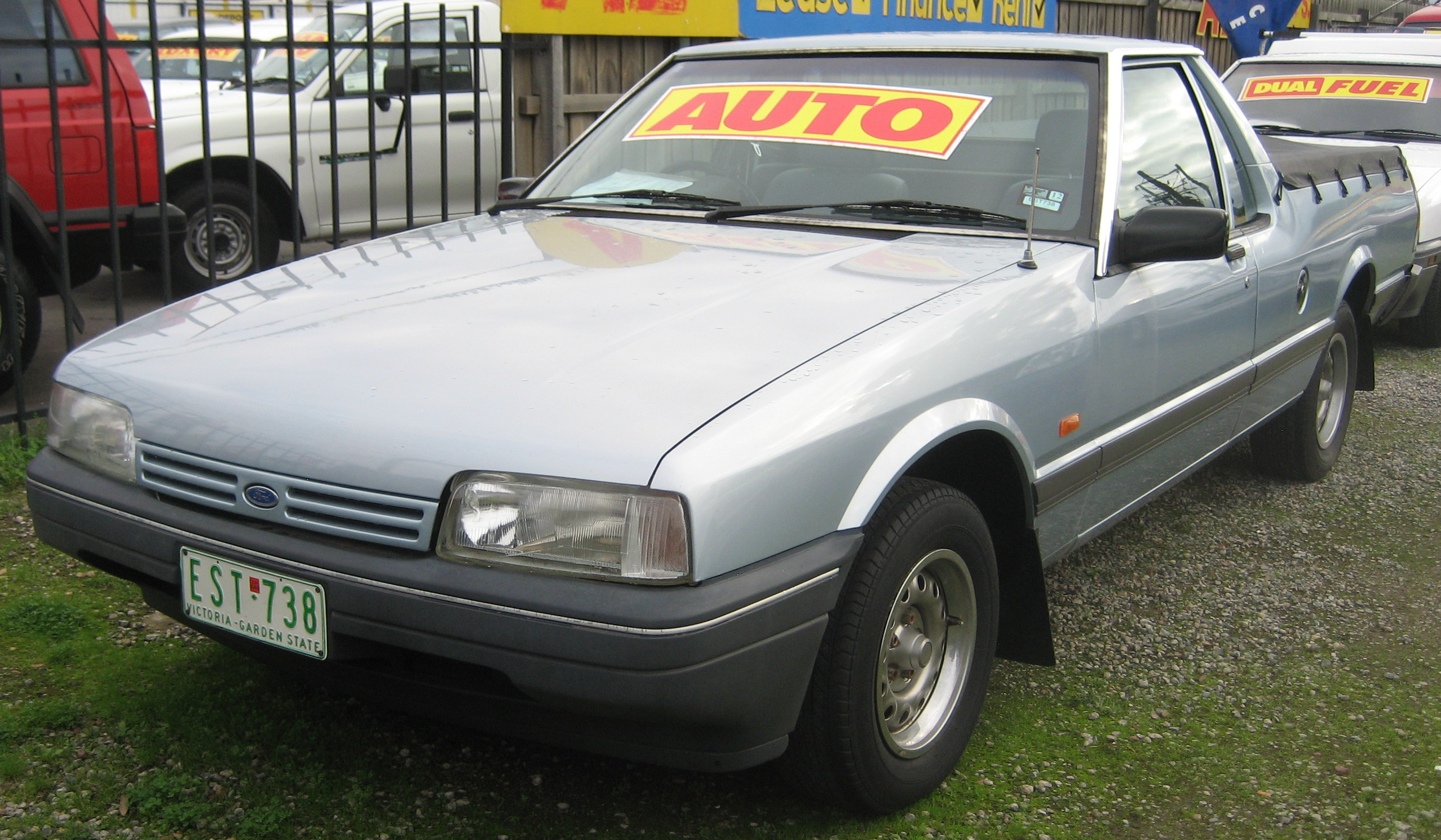
1990–1993 Ford Falcon utility

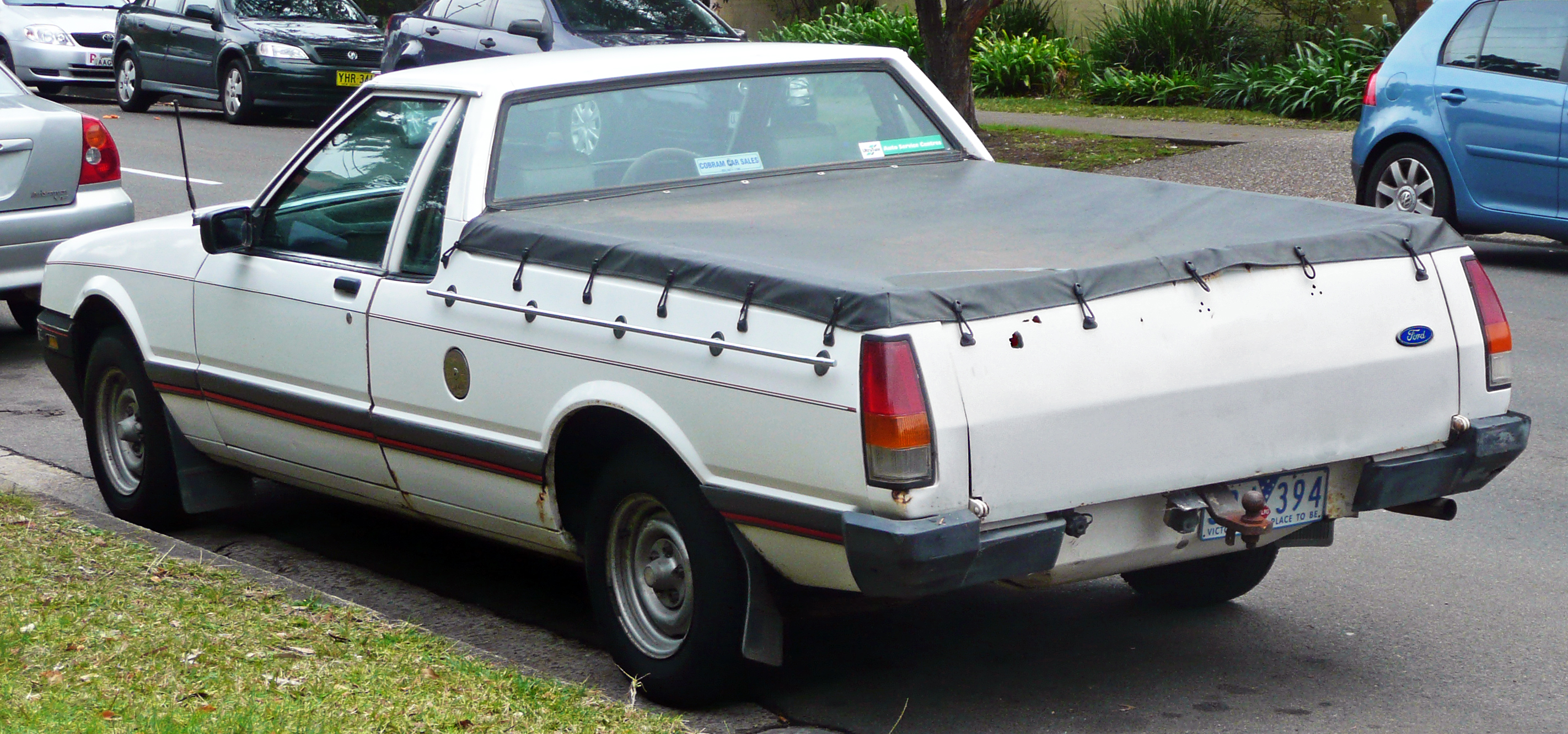
1988–1990 Ford Falcon utility

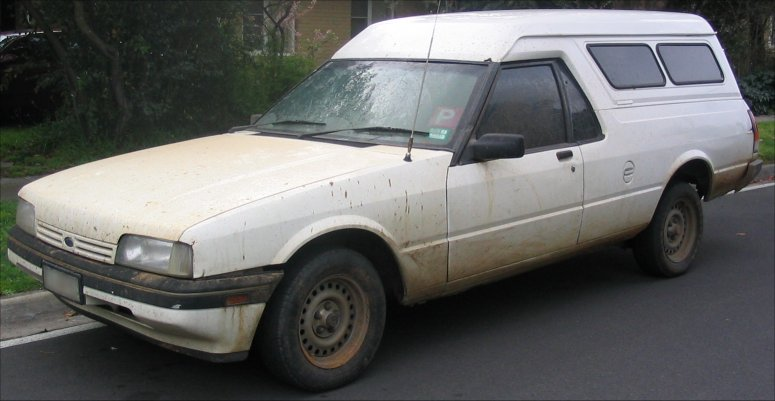
Ford Falcon Van (XF)

=== Nissan Ute ===
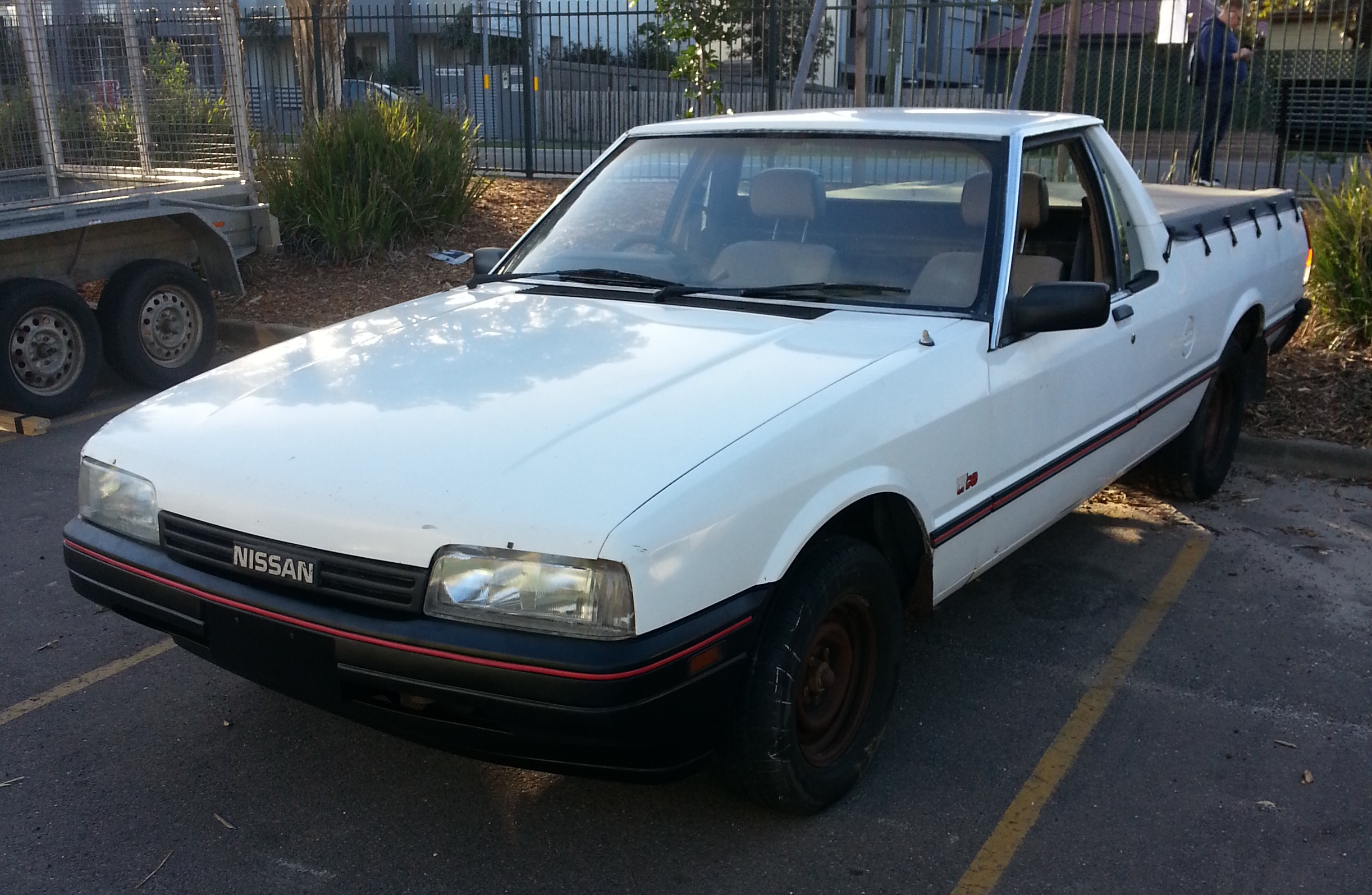
1988–1992 Nissan Ute

External image
- 1988 Nissan Ute print advertisement

The Nissan Ute was a badge-engineered version of the XF Falcon utility sold by Nissan in Australia from July 1988 to September 1992. Nissan Utes were sold as a result of a model-sharing scheme known as the Button car plan. In an attempt to rationalise the Australian automotive industry, the Button plan induced car manufacturers to share core platforms. For this particular vehicle, XF series Ford utility vehicles were rebadged as "Nissan", with a Nissan badge attached to the grille, decal on the tailgate and logo on the steering wheel.

Nissan did not offer the various equipment levels of the Ford donor vehicle, instead offering only two basic trims (DX and ST) without the option of an "S" pack. The plan was generally considered a "disaster" by the industry, as the car buying public steered clear of the badge-engineered vehicles. Furthermore, spare parts could often be purchased from only the original vehicle maker—as was the case with the Nissan Ute. The model code was "XFN".

== Reception ==
The XF Falcon and Fairmont range was Australia's top-selling car throughout its model run. The XF contributed to the Falcon range selling 68,313 units in its home market in 1984, a lead of 12,000 over the second-placed Holden Commodore, and accounting for more than 10 per cent of the total 633,745 vehicle sales that year. In 1985, the XF's first full year on sale, Falcon sales grew 12 per cent in a total market that grew 9 per cent, extending the lead over the Commodore to over 14,000 units. In 1986, despite Holden releasing the significantly updated VL Commodore for 1986, the XF Falcon/Fairmont range sold 66,436 units versus sales of 54,696 for the Commodore range. As Ford increased its overall market share to 29 per cent during a significant market downturn in 1987, journalist John Wright noted that a key factor in Ford's success was the Falcon's deep penetration into the fleet sales market, which had contracted only seven per cent versus a 33 per cent downturn in the market for private sales, where the Commodore had been slightly more popular.

In a three-way comparison with rivals Holden Commodore and Mitsubishi Magna featured in the June 1986 edition of Wheels magazine, the Falcon GL sedan was credited with being "deceptively well developed and impressively proficient in its own way", despite making "no pretence of being the most advanced or refined thing on wheels". There was criticism of its optional power steering being too light and too direct, while the standard unassisted steering was described as slow, heavy and devoid of feel. While the overhead cam engines and four-speed automatic transmissions offered in the Commodore and Magna were recognised as significantly more advanced than the pushrod engine and three-speed automatic drivetrain of the Falcon, its chassis dynamics were judged to be superior, with its handling described as "predictable, controllable and virtually fail-safe right up to the limit".

== Motorsport ==
Due to the lack of a V8 engine, the XF Falcon was not suitable for involvement in the Australian Touring Car Championship, with most Ford supporting drivers and/or teams electing to race the Ford Mustang or Ford Sierra RS Cosworth under the new Group A regulations.

The XF Falcon, however, was raced in the AUSCAR series, with Jim Richards winning the first AUSCAR series in a XF Falcon. XF AUSCAR's were fitted with 5.8 L 351 Cleveland V8s (subsequent Falcon models in AUSCAR racing would use the 5.0 L 302 cid V8), and had an aero kit designed by Ford Australia designer Wayne Draper.
