= Drivetrain Systems International =

Australian automotive parts company

Drivetrain System International Pty Ltd
- Industry: Automotive components
- Founded: 2004
- Headquarters: Scoresby, Victoria, Australia
- Products: Gearboxes and powertrains
- Parent: Shuanglin
- Website: www.dsinternational.com.au

Drivetrain System International (abbreviated as DSI), and previously operating as BorgWarner Australia, BTR, and ION is an Australian drivetrain constructor and engineering consultancy based in Scoresby, Victoria. At its previous manufacturing facilities in Albury, New South Wales, it produced drivetrains for Ford, Maserati, Chrysler, Geely and SsangYong. The company has also produced gearboxes for the Mahindra Scorpio.

== History ==
Drivetrain Systems International was formed following the purchase of the Lavington gearbox factory, built in 1971, from the ION Group in 2004. In 2007, the factory produced gearboxes for SsangYong, which became the DSI's largest customer following the cessation of Ford's patronage in 2011.

In 2009, the company entered bankruptcy protection, mostly due to the bankruptcy and halt of production of its main customer, SsangYong. An effect of this was the loss of 230 jobs at the Albury facilities, with 167 jobs remaining. The workers were eligible for the Australian Government's General Employees Entitlements and Redundancy Scheme. The same year, the company was purchased by Chinese car manufacturer Geely for over A$55 million.

Gearboxes designed by Drivetrain Systems International were manufactured in Geely factories in Hunan, Shandong and Chongqing.

Geely subsequently sold DSI to Chinese investment company Shuanglin in 2015 who continue to manufacture the DSI designed products in Xiangtan, Jining and Ninghai.

In 2020, DSI's Australian operations relocated to a new facility in Scoresby to provide engineering services both within and outside of the automotive field.

== Transmissions ==
=== 3-speed automatic ===
The company provided Ford Australia with three-speed automatic transmissions for rear-wheel drive (longitudinal engine) applications.

==== M51 ====
- Ford Falcon/Fairmont (EA)

=== 4-speed automatic ===
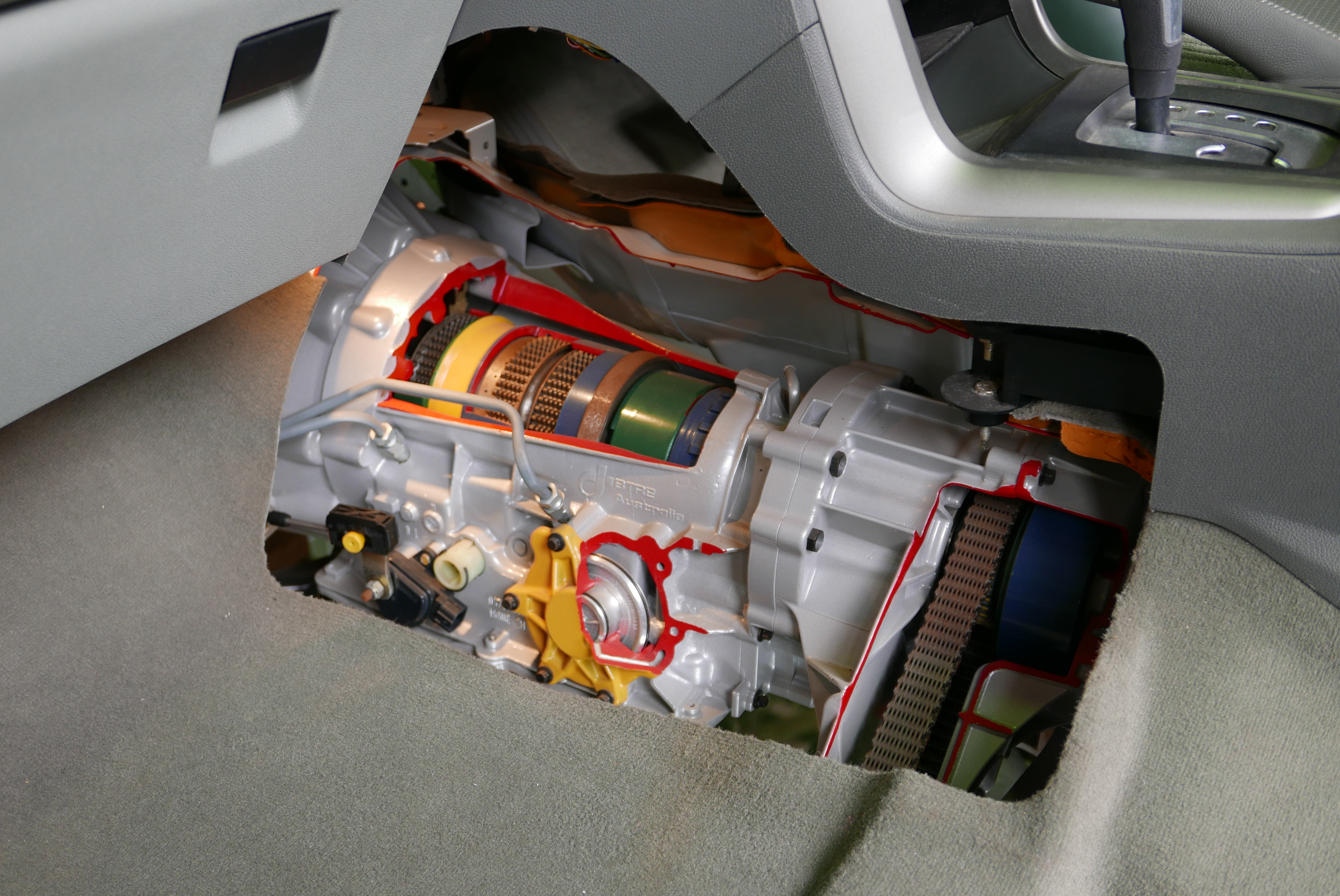
Cutaway of the four-speed M93LE automatic as fitted to the Ford Territory

The company provided Ford Australia, and later SsangYong Motor, with four-speed automatic transmissions for rear-wheel-drive (longitudinal engine) applications.

The M85LE first appeared in the 1989 Ford Falcon (EA II) and Ford Fairlane/LTD (NA/DA), and was progressively updated to the M91LE (1992) and M93LE (1994) in the Australian large Ford range. V8 versions of the Falcon, when released in 1992 used a revised version of the transmission, the M95LE, updated as the M97LE in 1994. The final applications used by Ford (for the M93LE) were the BF III Falcon wagon (2010), FG Falcon LPG (2010), and rear-wheel-drive SY II Territory (2011).

The SsangYong models used the M74LE version of the transmission.

==== M72LE ====
- Maserati 3200 GT Automatica: 3.2-litre
- Maserati Quattroporte IV 2.8-litre (1998–2001) & 3.2-litre (1996–2001)

==== M74LE ====
Also known as the M88.

- Dongfeng Future 2.4-litre (2005–2013)
- Great Wall Hover 2.0-litre & 2.4-litre (2012–2013)
- JAC Refine 2.4-litre (2005–2014)
- Maserati Coupé 3.2-litre (2000–2004)
- Mitsubishi Zinger 2.0-litre (2008–2015)
- SsangYong Actyon 2.0-litre diesel, 2.3-litre & 3.2-litre diesel (2005–2010)
- SsangYong/Daewoo Korando: 2.3-litre & 3.2-litre petrol, 2.0-litre & 2.9-liter diesel (1996–2005)
- SsangYong/Daewoo Musso: 2.3-litre petrol (1997–2005), 3.2-litre petrol (1997–2005), 2.9-litre diesel (1998–2005)
- SsangYong Rexton: 3.2-litre petrol (2002–2007), 2.7-litre diesel (2002–2008)

==== M85LE ====
- Ford Falcon/Fairmont (EA II, EB I): 3.9-litre
- Ford Fairlane/LTD (NA/DA): 3.9-litre

==== M91LE ====
- Ford Falcon/Fairmont (EB II, ED, XG): 4.0-litre
- Ford Fairlane/LTD (NC/DC): 4.0-litre

==== M93LE ====
Also known as the ION 93-4AT.

- Ford Falcon/Fairmont (EF, EL, XH, AU, BA, BF, FG E-Gas): 4.0-litre
- Ford Fairlane/LTD (NF/DF, NL/DL, AU, BA): 4.0-litre
- Ford Territory (SX, SY RWD, SY II RWD)

==== M95LE ====
- Ford Falcon/Fairmont (EB II, ED, AU): 5.0-litre
- Ford Falcon (BA XR6 Turbo): 4.0-litre turbo
- Ford Fairlane/LTD (NC/DC): 5.0-litre

==== M97LE ====
- Ford Falcon/Fairmont (EF, EL, XH, AU): 5.0-litre
- Ford Falcon/Fairmont (BA): 5.4-litre
- Ford Fairlane/LTD (NF/DF, NL/DL, AU): 5.0-litre
- Ford Fairlane/LTD (BA): 5.4-litre

=== 6-speed automatic ===
==== 575R6 ====
- Mahindra Scorpio mHawk 2.2-litre (2012–2017)
- SsangYong Actyon 2.0-litre (2012–2014)
- SsangYong Kyron 2.0-litre & 2.7-litre (2009–2014)

==== 6AT400F ====
- Englon SC7 2.0-litre (2012–)
- Englon SX7 2.4-litre (2013–)
- Emgrand EC7 1.8-litre (2012–)
- Emgrand EC8 2.0-litre & 2.4-litre (2012–)
- Emgrand EV7 1.8-litre, 2.0-litre & 2.4-litre (2013–)
- Geely GC7 1.8-litre & 2.0-litre (2012–)
- Geely GX7 1.8-litre, 2.0-litre & 2.4-litre (2012–)
- Proton X70 1.8-litre (2018–2020)

==== M78LE ====
- SsangYong Actyon 2.0-litre (2008–2018)
