= Ford Falcon (EL) =

Australian full-size car

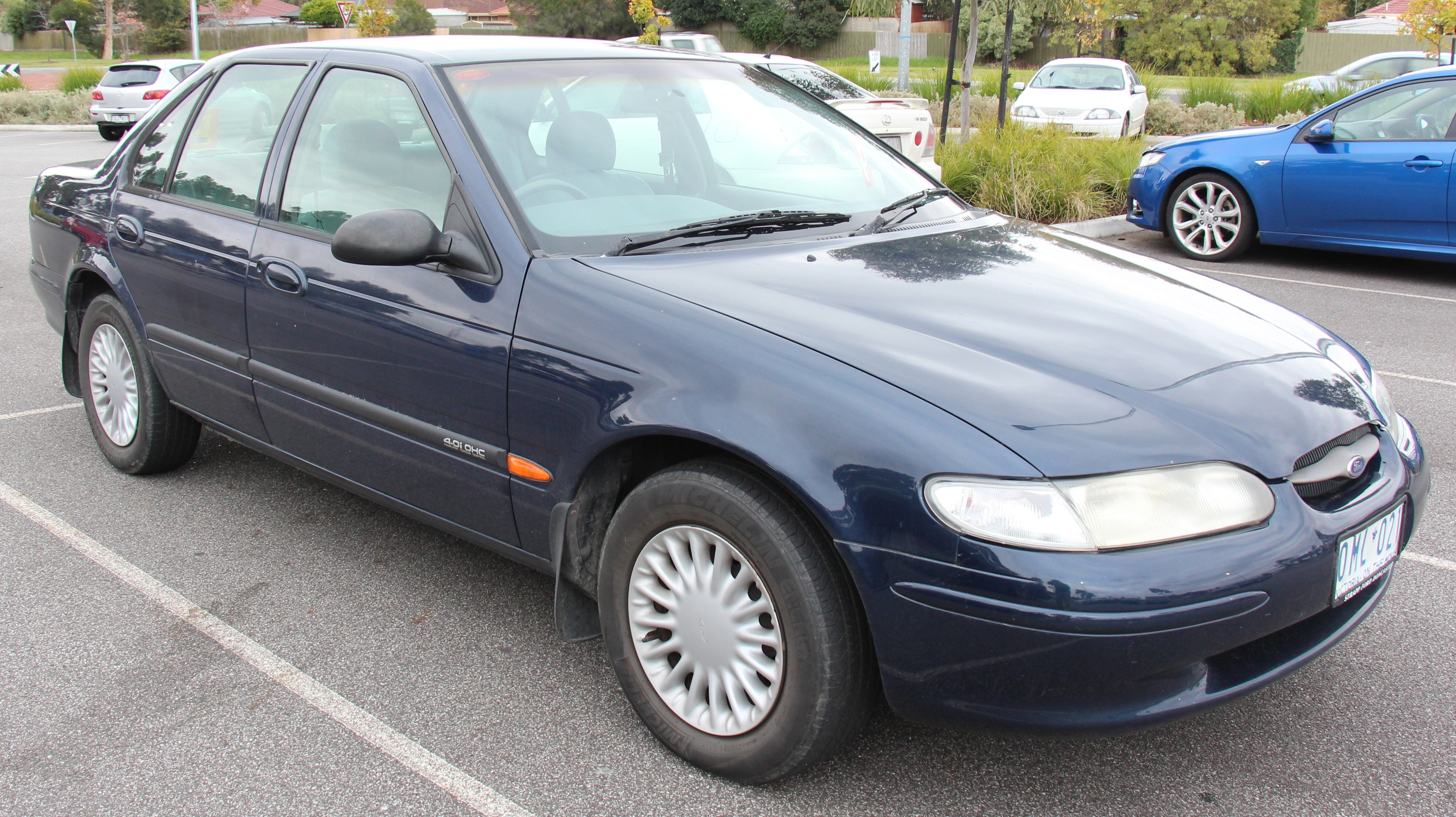

Overview
- Manufacturer: Ford Australia
- Also called: Ford Fairmont (EL)
- Production: October 1996 – August 1998
- Assembly: Broadmeadows, Melbourne, Australia

Body and chassis
- Class: Full-size car
- Body style: 4-door sedan 5-door station wagon
- Layout: Front-engine, rear-wheel-drive
- Platform: EA77
- Related: Ford LTD (DL); Ford Fairlane (NL); Ford Falcon (XH)

Powertrain
- Engine: 4.0 L SOHC Six I6 (petrol); 5.0 L Windsor V8 (petrol)
- Transmission: 4-speed M93LE automatic (I6); 4-speed M97LE automatic (V8); 5-speed Tremec T-5 manual

Dimensions
- Wheelbase: Sedan: 2,791 mm (109.9 in); Wagon: 2,923 mm (115.1 in)
- Length: Sedan: 4,906 mm (193.1 in); Wagon: 5,055 mm (199.0 in)
- Width: 1,861 mm (73.3 in)
- Height: 1,453 mm (57.2 in)
- Kerb weight: Sedan: 1,536–1,704 kg (3,386–3,757 lb); Wagon: 1,600 kg (3,500 lb)

Chronology
- Predecessor: Ford Falcon (EF)
- Successor: Ford Falcon (AU)

The Ford Falcon (EL) is a full-size car that was produced by Ford Australia from 1996 to 1998. It was the fifth and final iteration of the fifth generation of the Falcon and also included the Ford Fairmont (EL)—the luxury-oriented version.

The EL series served as the final chapter of the fifth generation "E-series" architecture, which began with the EA of 1988. Ford discontinued the car in 1998, and replaced it with the AU. Like its predecessors, the EL Falcon was widely favoured by Australian police and taxi operators. The EL remains one of the most popular Falcons produced.

== Development ==
The EL served as a facelift of its predecessor, the EF Falcon, which began production in 1994. The "E-series" architecture can trace its roots back to 1988 with the EA. Ford spent A$40 million for the development of the EL. Ford introduced a number of improvements aimed at extending the life of the "E-series" body while the AU Falcon was being developed. Most of the handling and steering problems with the EF were rectified in the EL. Critics at the time stated the EF Falcon was hard to handle and it felt as if the front suspension of the vehicle was not optimally setup to work with the geometry of the live-axle rear end (the AU would be the first Falcon to offer an independent rear end). Ford addressed these concerns making the EL far more responsive than the EF (see below).

At launch, it was the only Australian-built car equipped with a driver's airbag standard across the board, with a passenger airbag available as an extra cost option.

=== Facelift and upgrades ===
Compared to the EF, the most obvious visual change was the return of the front grille for GLi and Futura models. The grille itself was now elliptical in shape, a trait shared by other Ford models available at the time. The overall effect was to give the front of the car a rounded visual theme, continuing a shift away from the angular aero style of the early "E-series" models. From the rear, amber indicators were fitted on the base sedan models, with white lenses reserved for the luxury and station wagons. The performance models (XR6 and XR8) saw revised quad headlights.

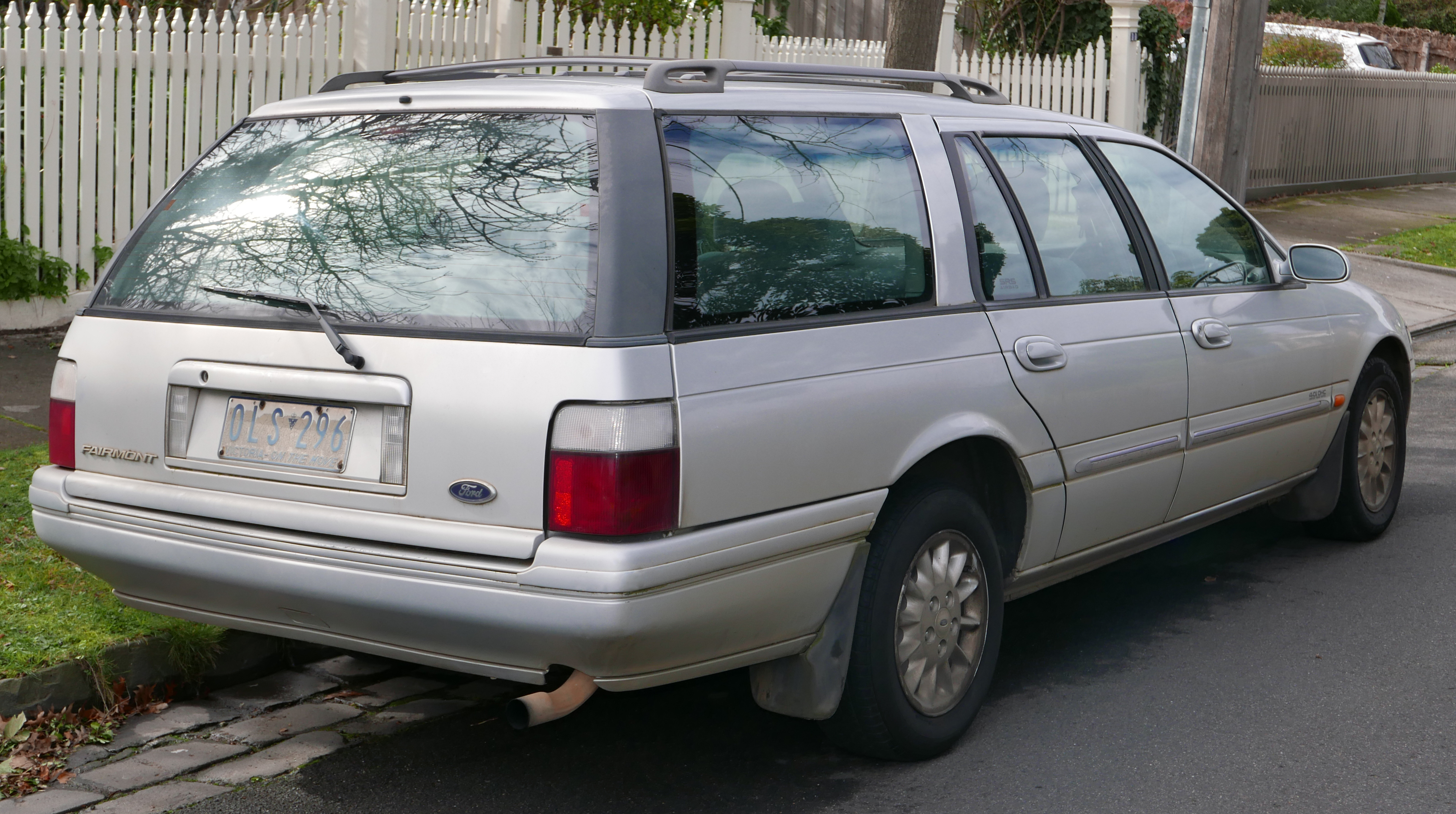
Ford Fairmont wagon. Compared to EB–EF station wagons, ELs are differentiated by white as opposed to amber rear turn signals.

Interior upgrades came in the form of reshaped seats and headrests, new colour schemes and switches. Third-row seating, a cargo barrier, and preinstalled wiring to accommodate mobile phone usage were made available as options for the station wagon variants. Additionally, all models were fitted with an advanced window film known as Smart Tint, which claimed to provide equivalent protection levels of SPF15 sunscreen. For improved vehicle refinement, thicker glass was installed to lessen wind noise and a further insulation was added in the dashboard to produce a quieter ride.

=== Engine ===
The EL introduced only minor running changes to the Falcon's base model straight-six engine, when compared to the radical overhaul presented by the EF. The coil-pack ignition system introduced in the EF was rolled back to the distributor-style ignition from the ED Falcon due to reliability problems. A divided air induction pipe which led to the throttle was replaced with a single, wider pipe. Engine output remained unchanged at 157 kilowatts (211 hp) and 357 newton metres (263 ft·lbf). In October 1997, the V8 engine fitted to the XR8 sports model was upgraded from 170 kilowatts (228 hp) to 185 (248 hp). Torque figures were also upped from 398 newton metres (294 ft·lbf) to 402 (296 ft·lbf).

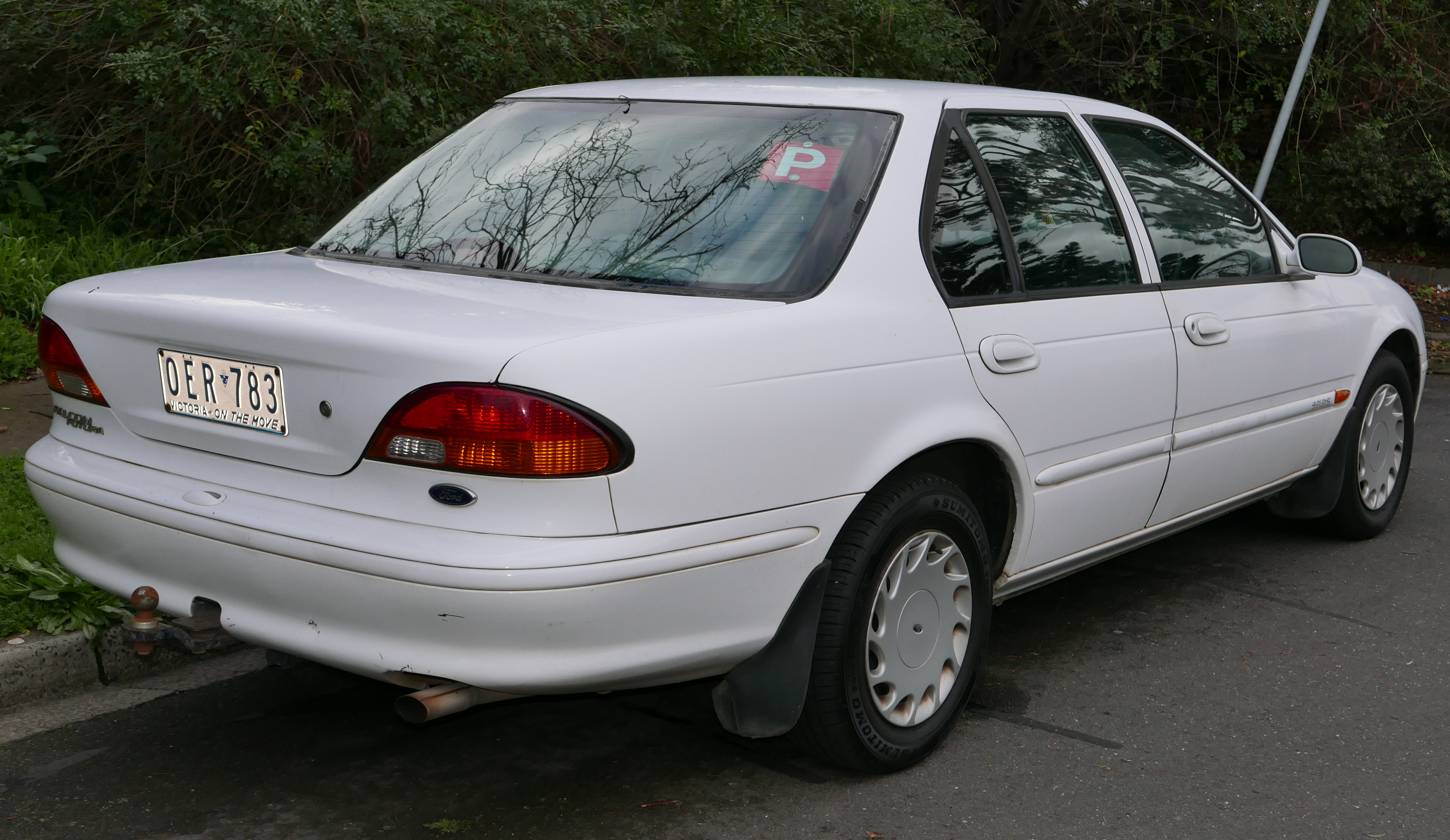
Ford Falcon Futura sedan. Amber rear turn signals on GLi and Futura sedans replaced the white EF lenses.

=== Handling and braking ===
The EL brought with it improvements to braking and handling. Speed-sensitive power steering on the Fairmont Ghia made parking more straightforward, without compromising high-speed steering. With the introduction of the new model, buyers could now purchase a Falcon with standard (optional on GLi) anti-lock brakes featuring the latest Bosch 5.3 module. Perhaps the biggest advancement with the EL was the improvements to the handling woes of the EF, with improvements established to the suspension and steering. Engineers at Tickford had discovered that by lowering the pivot point of the Watt's linkages in the rear suspension by 20 millimetres (0.8 in), that the roll oversteer effect which plagued the EF could finally be eliminated. Previously on EF models, during hard cornering the rear end of the car often felt as if it could not keep up with the front, due to the difference in roll rate between the front and rear suspension. The result of this produced unpredictable car handling at times, where the delayed weight transfer at the rear would seek to damage the integrity of the outside rear tyre grip. This was exaggerated even further in wet weather or on vehicles fitted with poor tyres. Although this problem was addressed to a degree in the EFII update, it was the EL that became the first base level Falcon to feature a rear suspension setup that would complement the precision of rack and pinion steering introduced in the EA Falcon eight years earlier. The improved suspension geometry allowed Ford to soften the spring rates on both front and rear on the EL for a more compliant ride, as the driver no longer had roll oversteer to contain.

== Model range ==
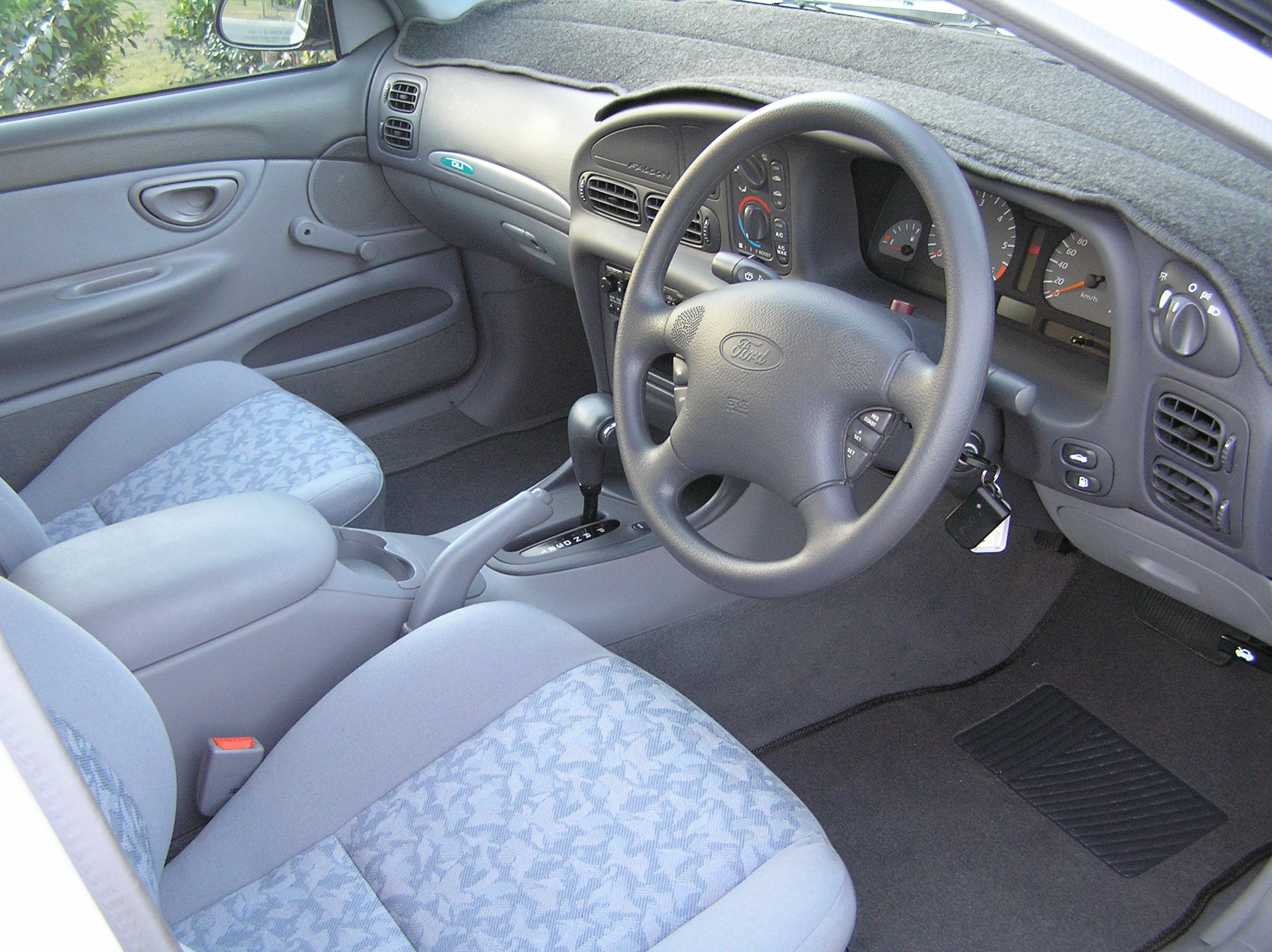
Interior, Falcon GLi

Ten variants of the EL were produced, six-cylinder variants came standard with a five-speed manual, with the option of a four-speed automatic transmission. With the exception of the XR8, which could be purchased with the five-speed manual, all V8s were fitted with the four-speed automatic.

Base models

The GLi was the most basic model Falcon, selling well with fleets. Its features list was identical to that of the previous model, which included Ford's straight-six engine, with an option of upgrading to the Windsor V8. The slightly more equipped Futura features ABS brakes, front power windows, cruise control and a number of luxury features, like back seat headrests and an enhanced sound system. To distinguish it from the GLi, body-coloured components replaced the black plastic type. Regardless of the model chosen, an optional dual fuel tank could be fitted to run on both autogas and petrol.

Limited editions

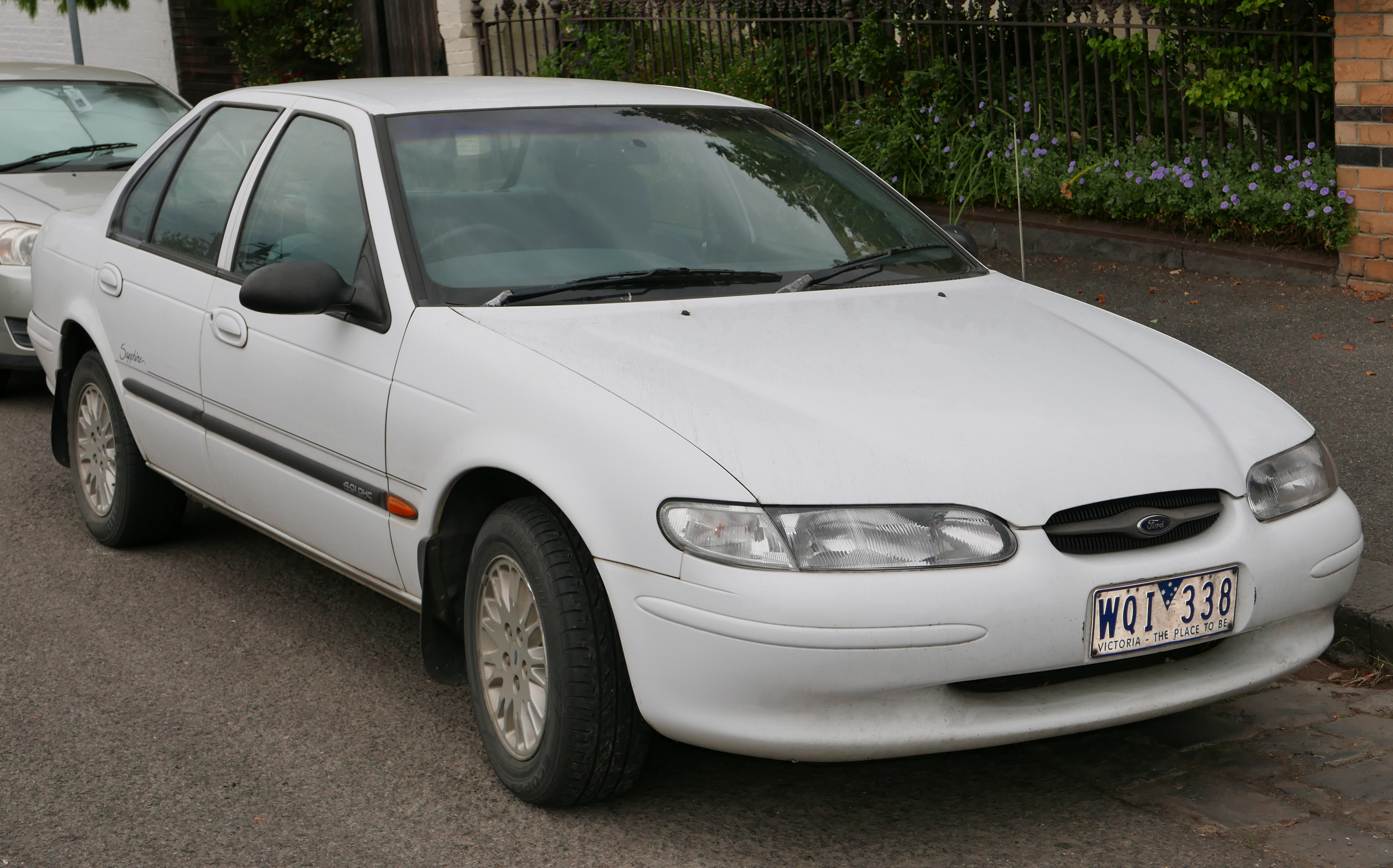
Falcon GLi Sapphire II sedan

Ford introduced the Sapphire shortly after Holden debuted the VT Commodore in September 1997, in a bid to make the EL more competitive. The name was reused from the Ford Sierra Sapphire sedan sold in Europe and New Zealand. It was a limited-edition model and had two variants based on either the GLi or the Futura, fitted with additional features, however the list differed depending on the base model chosen. All Sapphires had 15 in (380 mm) alloy wheels and metallic paint as standard. Other responses to the VT Commodore were the Classic and Falcon S models. Similarly to the Sapphire, they too were limited edition variants based on either the GLi or Futura. Standard for the Falcon S included a six-stack CD player, air conditioning, and alloy wheels which were identical to those fitted to the XR6 and XR8 models of the earlier ED Falcon range. Later, in March 1998, six months before the launch of the AU Falcon, a Sapphire II was introduced.

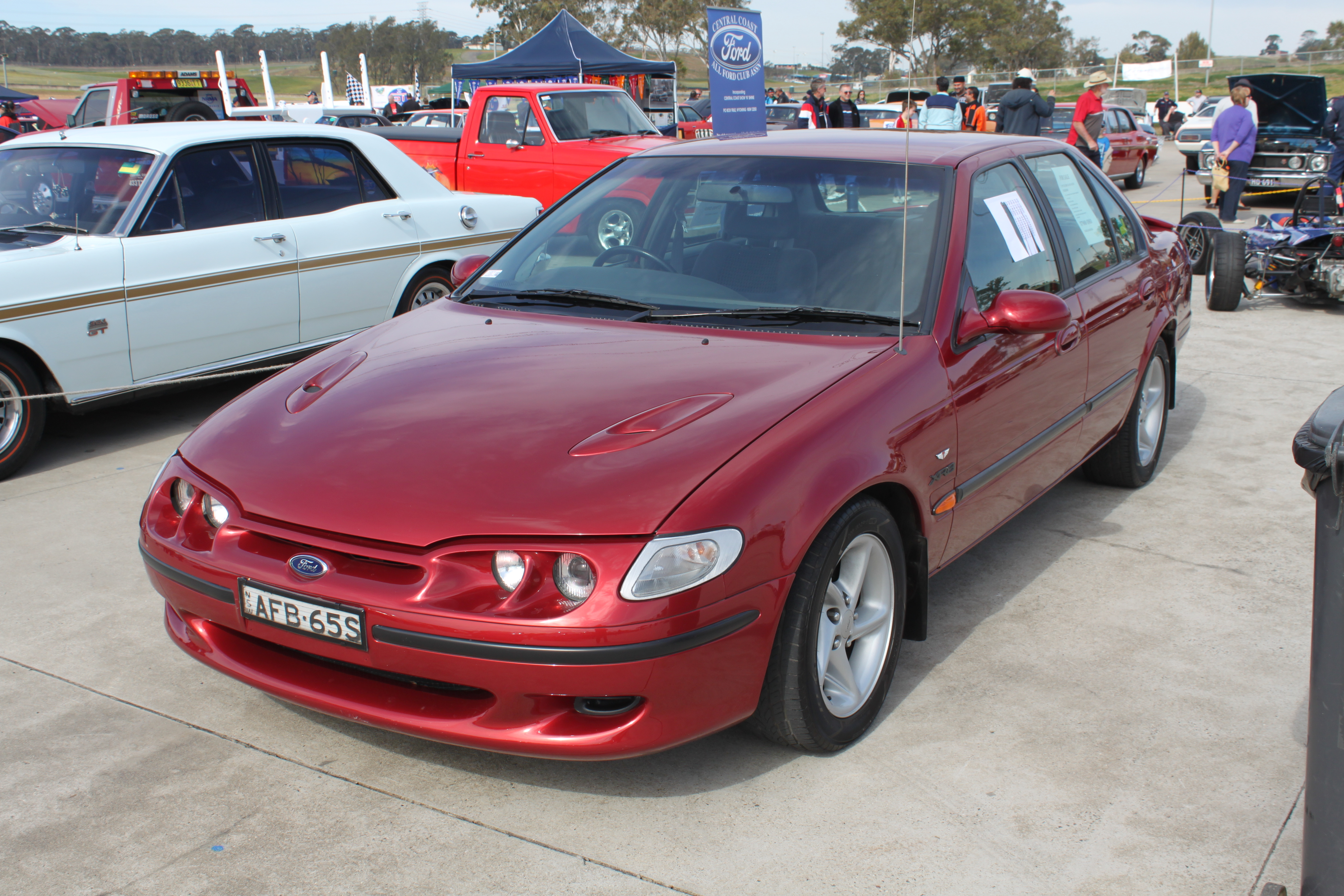
Falcon XR8 sedan

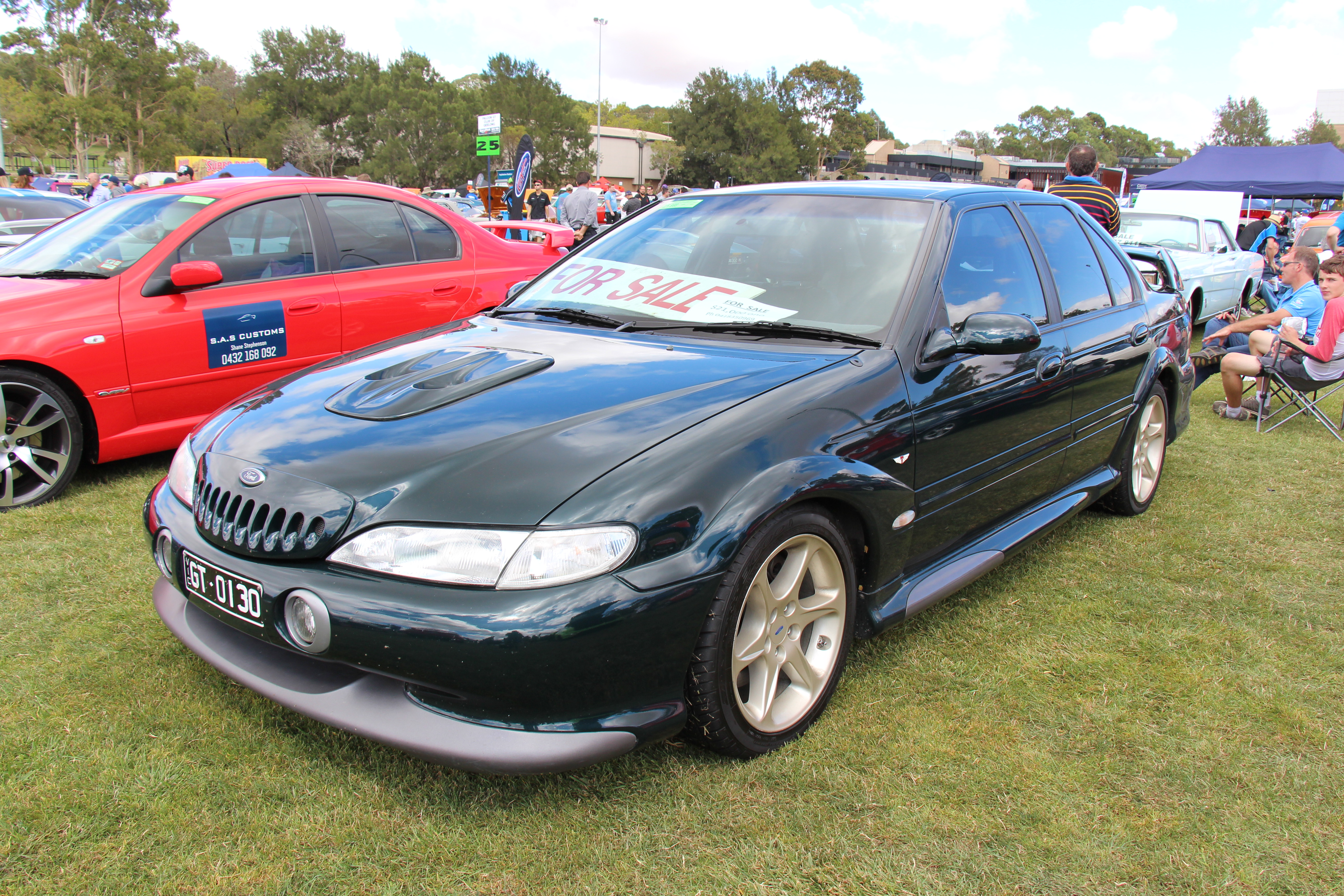
Falcon GT sedan

Sports models

The biggest difference between the "XR series" performance versions and standard models were the engines; the XR6 and XR8 boasted a 164 kW (220 hp) six-cylinder and a 170 kW (228 hp) V8 respectively. The V8 was later upgraded to output 185 kilowatts (248 hp) in October 1997. The upgraded transmission and exhaust system were unique to the XR range, as was the exterior styling with an XR exclusive quad headlamp assembly giving the vehicle a higher degree of aggression when compared to the look possessed by the other variants. Both models came standard with a limited-slip differential and specially tuned suspension. Body kits were also installed to improve the aesthetics and the aerodynamics. The first series of 824 XR8 models had the 170 kW (228 hp) engine and 3.23:1 diff ratio with 15-inch alloy wheels. The second and last of the series numbered 784 examples and was equipped with a 185 kW (248 hp) engine, shorter 3.45:1 diff ratio, 16-inch alloy wheels, big-bore exhaust headers and the late model Explorer inlet manifold as standard.

GT

The GT had a Tickford Vehicle Engineering Ford SVO GT40 5.0 litre V8, producing 200 kilowatts (268 hp) of power due to the special SVO GT40 cylinder heads, a high compression ratio of 9.0:1, large valves, heavy-duty valve springs, roller cam followers, fuel injection with a large throttle body and exhaust extractors. The manual version had a heavy-duty clutch, strengthened gears and a short-throw gearshift as standard. Handling was improved with a larger anti-roll bar, urethane bushes, higher-rate springs and retuned front shock absorbers. The EL GT had a 3.45-ratio differential with a live axle and its top speed was around 230 km/h (140 mph).

Unlike what was first anticipated, the 30th anniversary EL Falcon GT was based loosely on the Fairmont Ghia rather than the XR models, with only 250 built for Australia — 135 were (4-speed) automatic and 115 were (5-speed) manual. 15 extra EL GT Falcons were built for New Zealand and 2 of those went to South Africa.

Luxury models

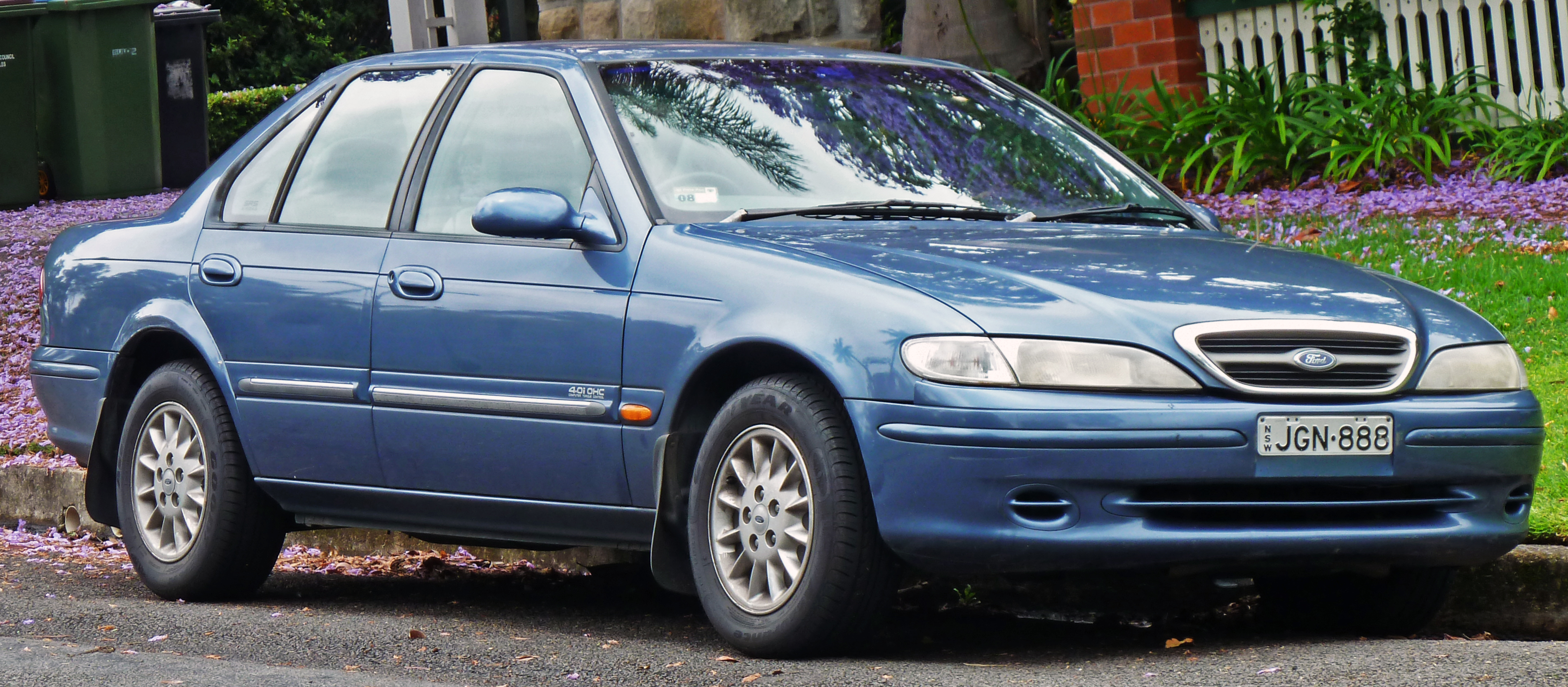
Fairmont sedan

Along with the base and sports models, Ford also marketed two luxury-oriented variants. The first of the two, known as the Fairmont employed the same six-cylinder engine as the Futura and GLi. Building on the equipment level of the Futura, the Fairmont gained, automatic climate control air conditioning, trip computer, power rear windows, oil pressure and battery level gauges, front and rear illuminated footwells, electric aerial and full velour interior. Exterior wise, a more prominent chrome front grille, a larger bonnet bulge, and differently shaped headlamps distinguished the Fairmont from other EL models, as did 15-inch, 12-spoke alloy wheels. The Fairmont was also fitted with chrome insert side body mouldings and carried over the tail light lenses from the previous EF model.

The Fairmont Ghia offered a combination of luxury and performance, which was emphasised most effectively by making use of the six-cylinder engine fitted to the XR6, with the V8 remaining optional. Due to the implementation of a quieter exhaust, the Ghia suffered from a slight loss in output compared to the XR6. A limited-slip differential provided better handling than the Fairmont, as did improved variable-ratio power steering. Equipment wise, the Fairmont Ghia gained a more powerful, nine-speaker stereo system, a passenger airbag, thicker 5-millimetre (0.20 in) side glass for better sound absorption, wood-grain trim, chrome door handles and accents as well as a leather-wrapped steering wheel, handbrake handle and leather upholstery. Externally, to differentiate the Fairmont from the Fairmont Ghia, the centre bar of the chrome front grille was colour-coded to the exterior paint, and 15-inch eight-spoke alloy wheels were fitted.

== Motorsport ==
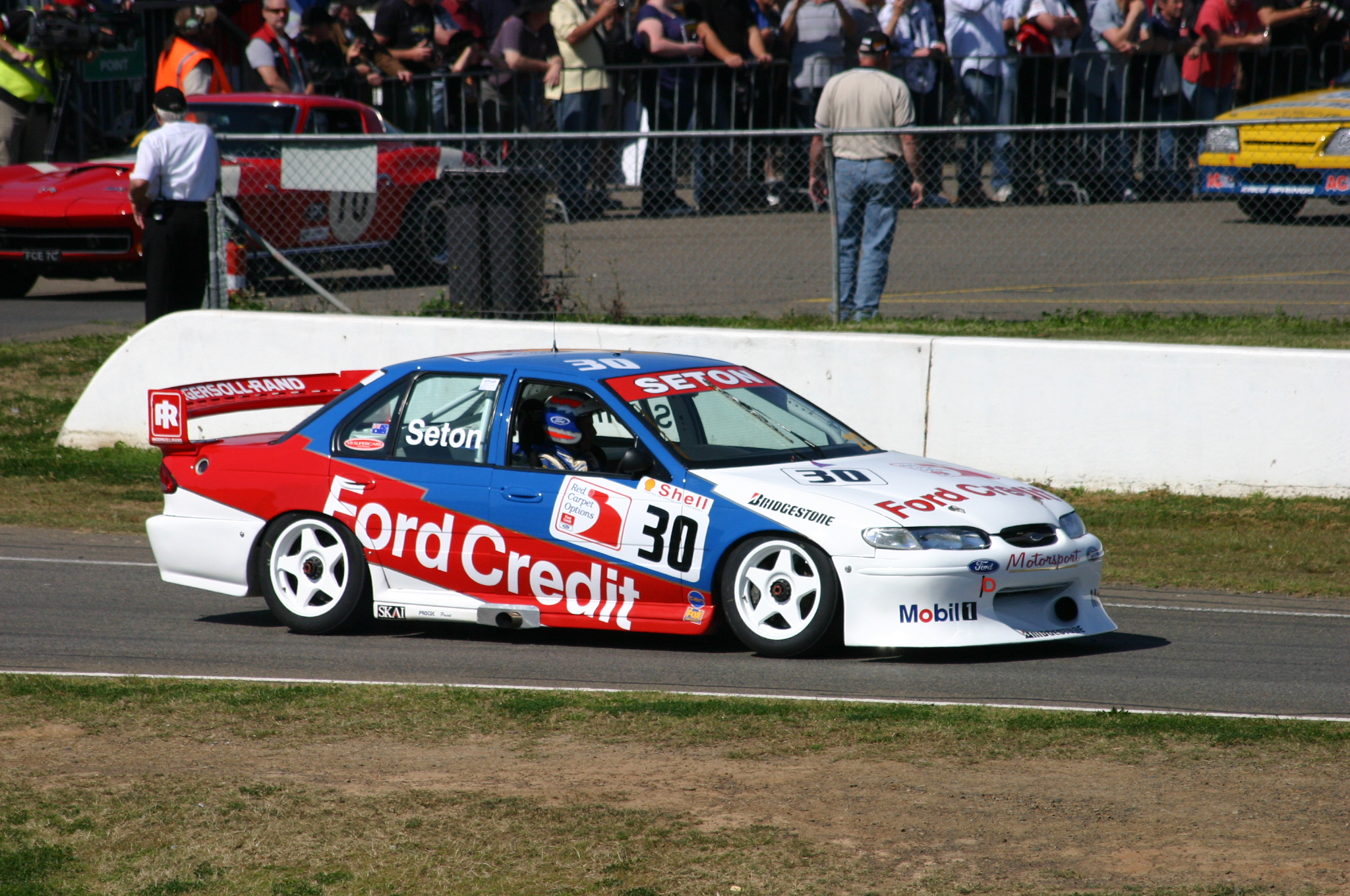
Glenn Seton Racing 1997 Falcon EL

Stone Brothers Racing took first place in the 1998 Bathurst 1000 classic racing an EL Falcon driven by Jason Bright and Steven Richards. This 1998 EL Falcon holds a significant place in Ford Australia's racing history as it was the only Falcon to take victory at the Bathurst 1000 in the decade between 1995 and 2005.

Glenn Seton Racing won the 1997 Australian Touring Car Championship with Glenn Seton driving an EL Falcon.

== See also ==
- Ford Falcon (XH) – utility and panel van versions of the Falcon line running concurrently with the EL series of cars and wagons.
