= Ford Falcon (XG) =

Australian full-size car

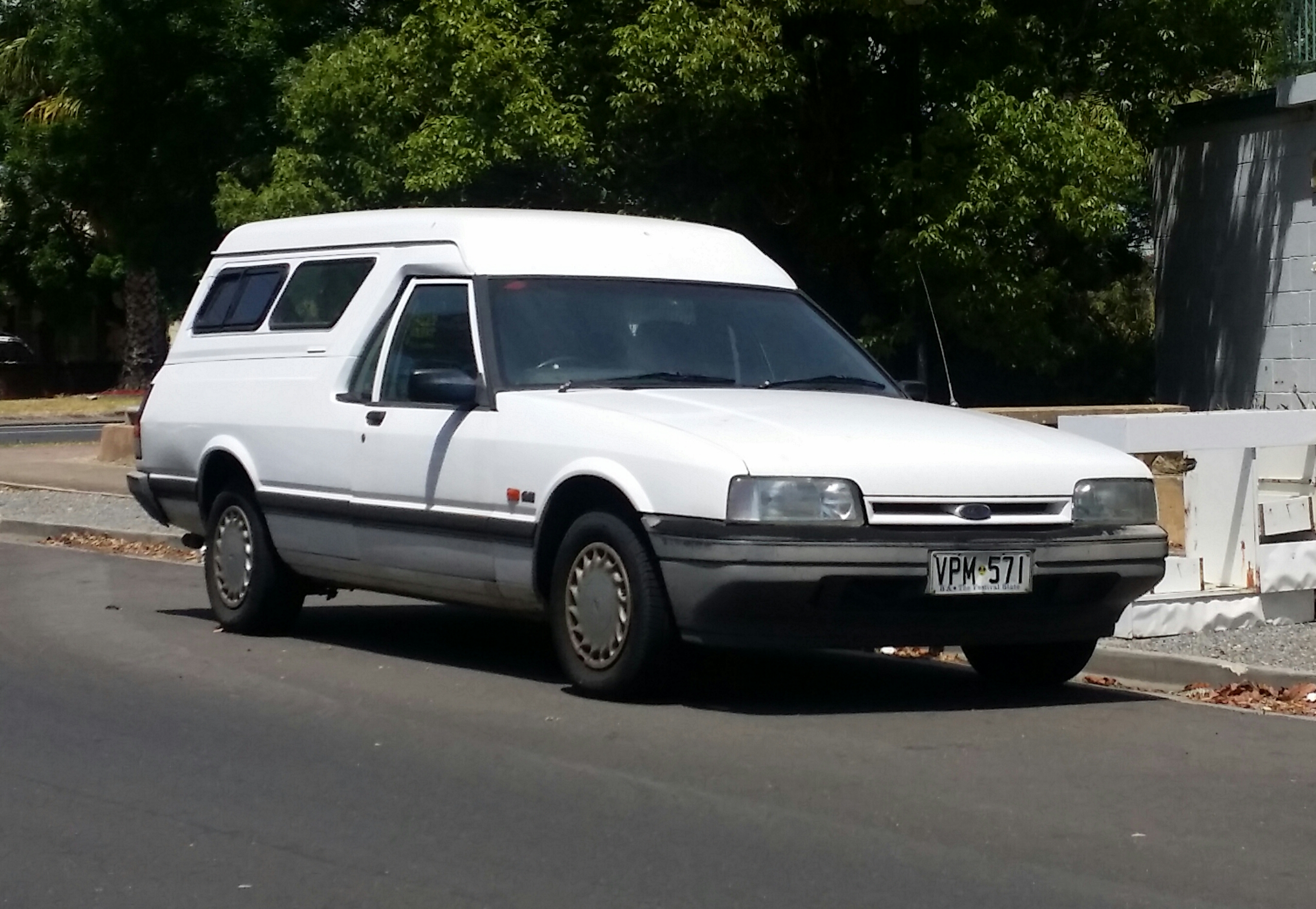
- 1994 Ford Falcon (XG) Longreach GLi panel van

Overview
- Manufacturer: Ford Australia
- Production: March 1993 – April 1996

Body and chassis
- Body style: 2-door coupe utility 2-door panel van
- Layout: FR layout
- Related: Ford Falcon (XF)

Powertrain
- Engine: 4.0 L Ford I6 (petrol)
- Transmission: 4-speed M91LE automatic (I6); 5-speed manual

Dimensions
- Wheelbase: 2,957 mm (116.4 in) (utility)
- Length: 4,920 mm (193.7 in) (utility)
- Width: 1,860 mm (73.2 in) (utility)
- Height: 1,366 mm (53.8 in) (utility)
- Kerb weight: 1,525 kg (3,362 lb) (utility)

Chronology
- Predecessor: Ford Falcon (XF)
- Successor: Ford Falcon (XH)

The Ford Falcon (XG) is a range of commercial vehicles which was manufactured by Ford Australia from 1993 to 1996. It was derived from the Ford Falcon (XF) full-size car.

== Introduction ==
The XG Falcon was introduced in March 1993 as a facelift of the XF commercial range, which it replaced. The XG was marketed in coupe utility and panel van body styles and during its three years in production it was sold alongside the EB Falcon, ED Falcon and EF Falcon sedan and wagon models.

The XG carried over the XF Falcon body, with a new radiator grille, and repeater indicator lamps and engine displacement badges mounted behind the front wheels, similar to the treatment of these components on the EB Falcon. The significant changes were mechanical, with the 4.0 litre fuel-injected single overhead camshaft (OHC) engine and the four-speed automatic or five-speed manual transmission options offered in the EB Falcon range replacing the previous carburetted 4.1 litre overhead valve (OHV) engine and three-speed transmissions offered in the XF. The interior also saw minor updates, with the instrument panels of EB Falcon GLi and S models being adapted to the carried-over XF dashboard.

== Model range ==
The XG range included two-door coupe utility and two-door panel van body styles, marketed as follows.

- Ford Falcon Longreach GLi utility
- Ford Falcon Longreach GLi panel van
- Ford Falcon Longreach S utility
- Ford Falcon Longreach Outback utility (released June 1995)
- Ford Falcon XR6 utility (released October 1993)

A limited edition Longreach GLi Tradesman utility was offered from December 1995, with 800 examples produced.

== Engine and transmissions ==
The XG was powered by a 4.0-litre SOHC straight six 148 kW (198 hp) 4.0-litre six cylinder overhead camshaft engine. The XR6 model was fitted with a 161 kW (216 hp) version of this unit. Five-speed manual and four-speed automatic transmissions were available.

== 60th Anniversary model ute ==
In 1994, Ford produced a special limited-edition model ute to commemorate the 60th Anniversary of the first coupe utility (introduced by Ford Australia in 1934). It featured body coloured bumpers and mirrors, alloy bullbar, alloy wheels, floor carpet and full instrumentation at no extra cost.

== Replacement ==
The XG series was replaced by the Ford Falcon (XH) in April 1996.

== Gallery ==
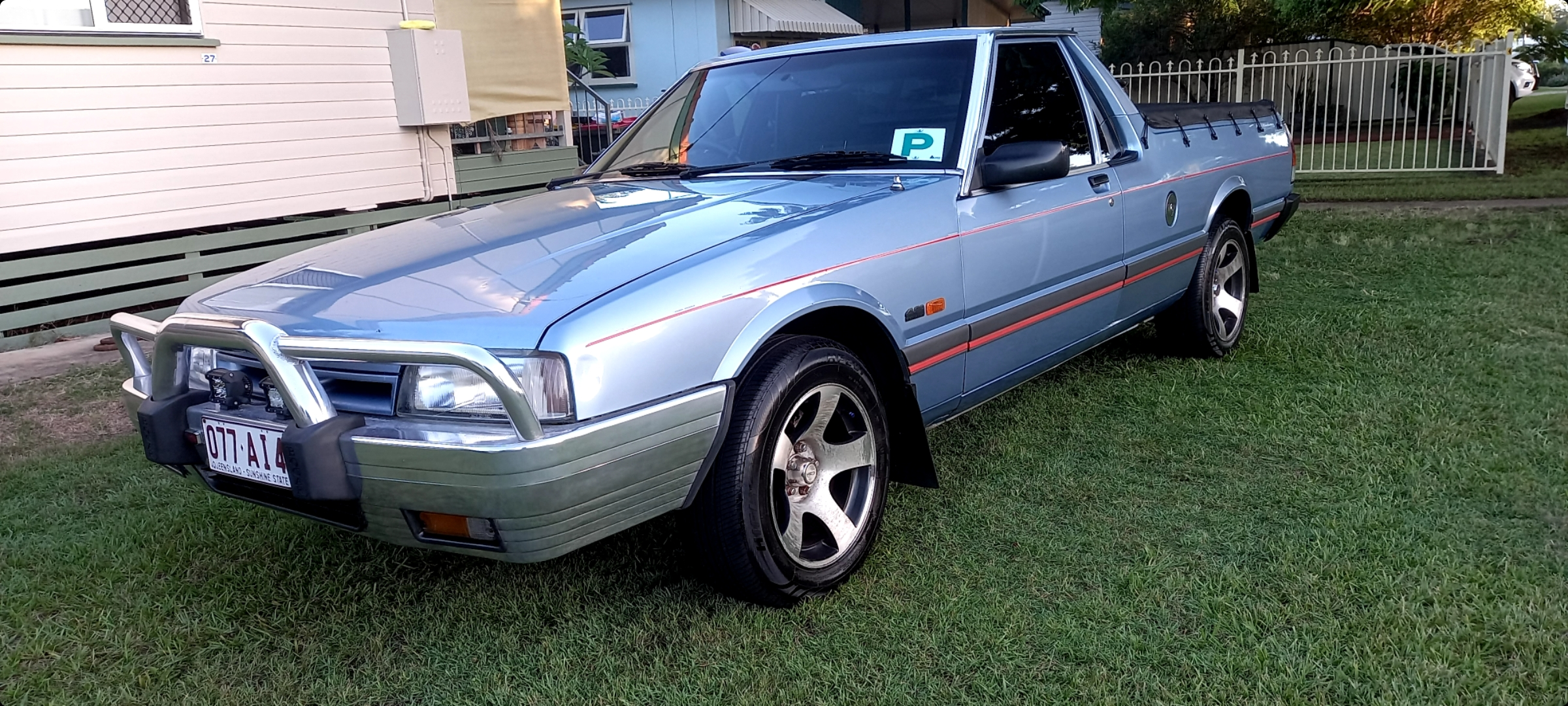
1993 Ford XG Longreach Ute

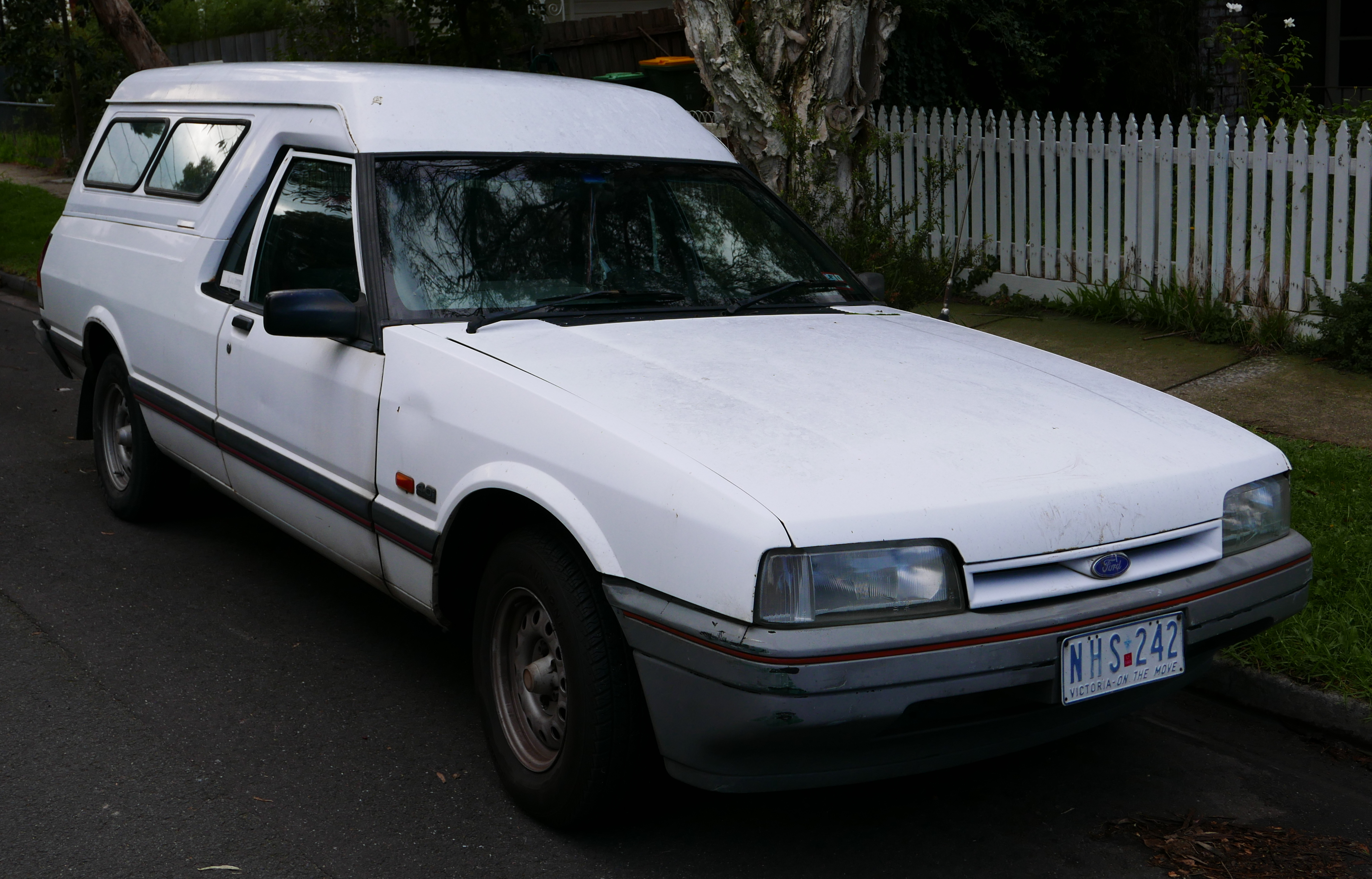
1995 Longreach GLi panel van

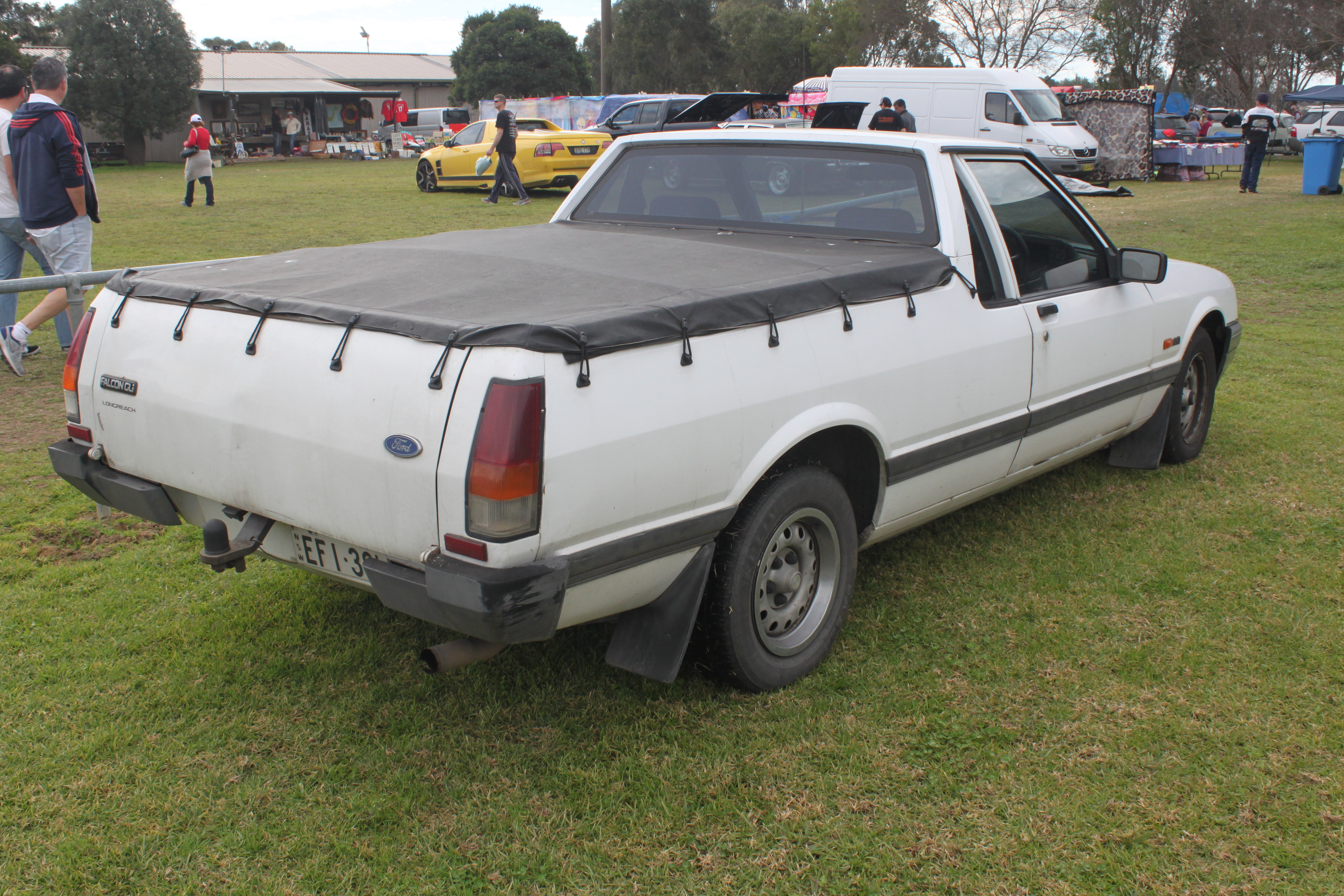
1995 Longreach GLi utility

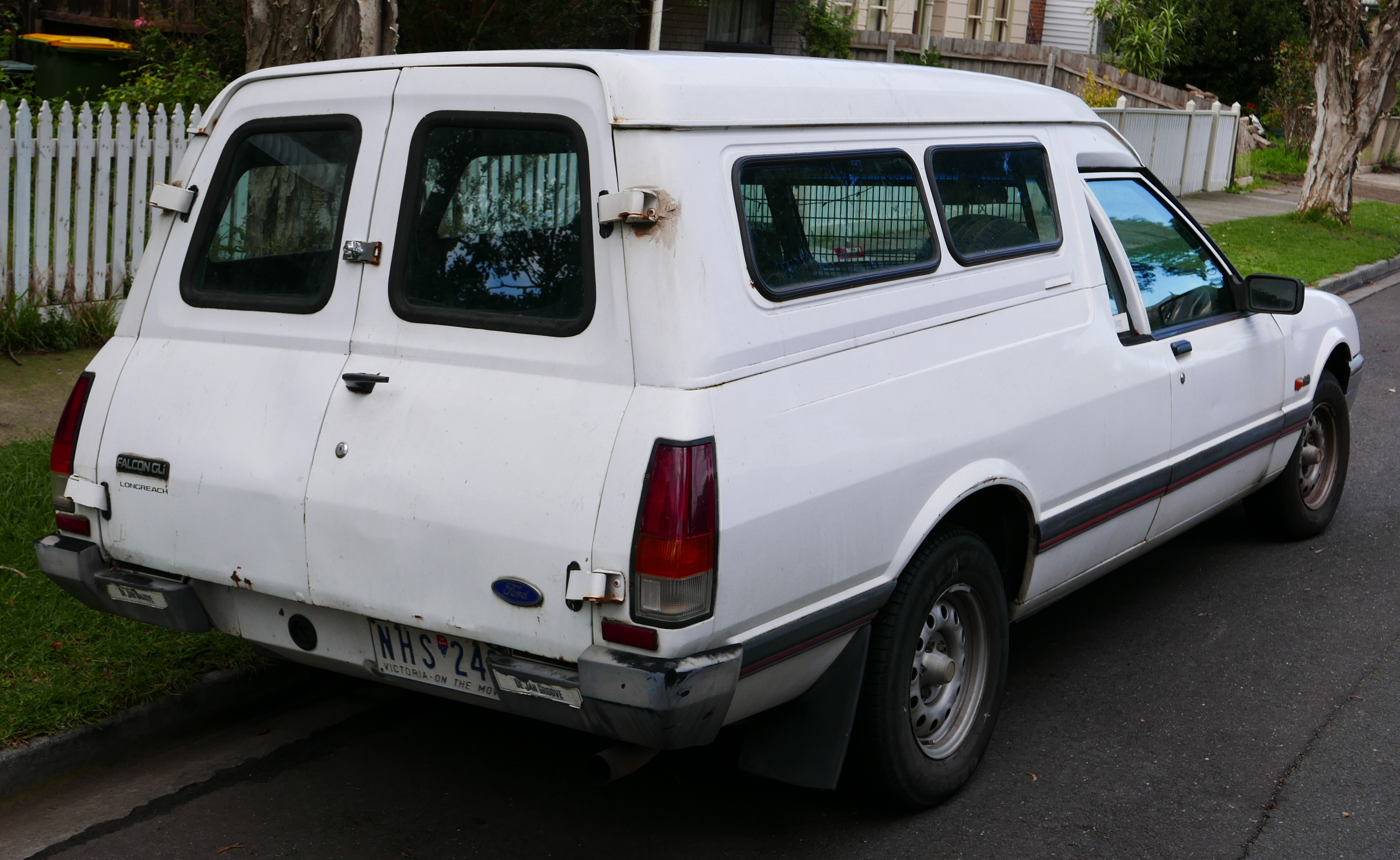
1995 Longreach GLi panel van
