= Ford Falcon (XH) =

Australian full-size car

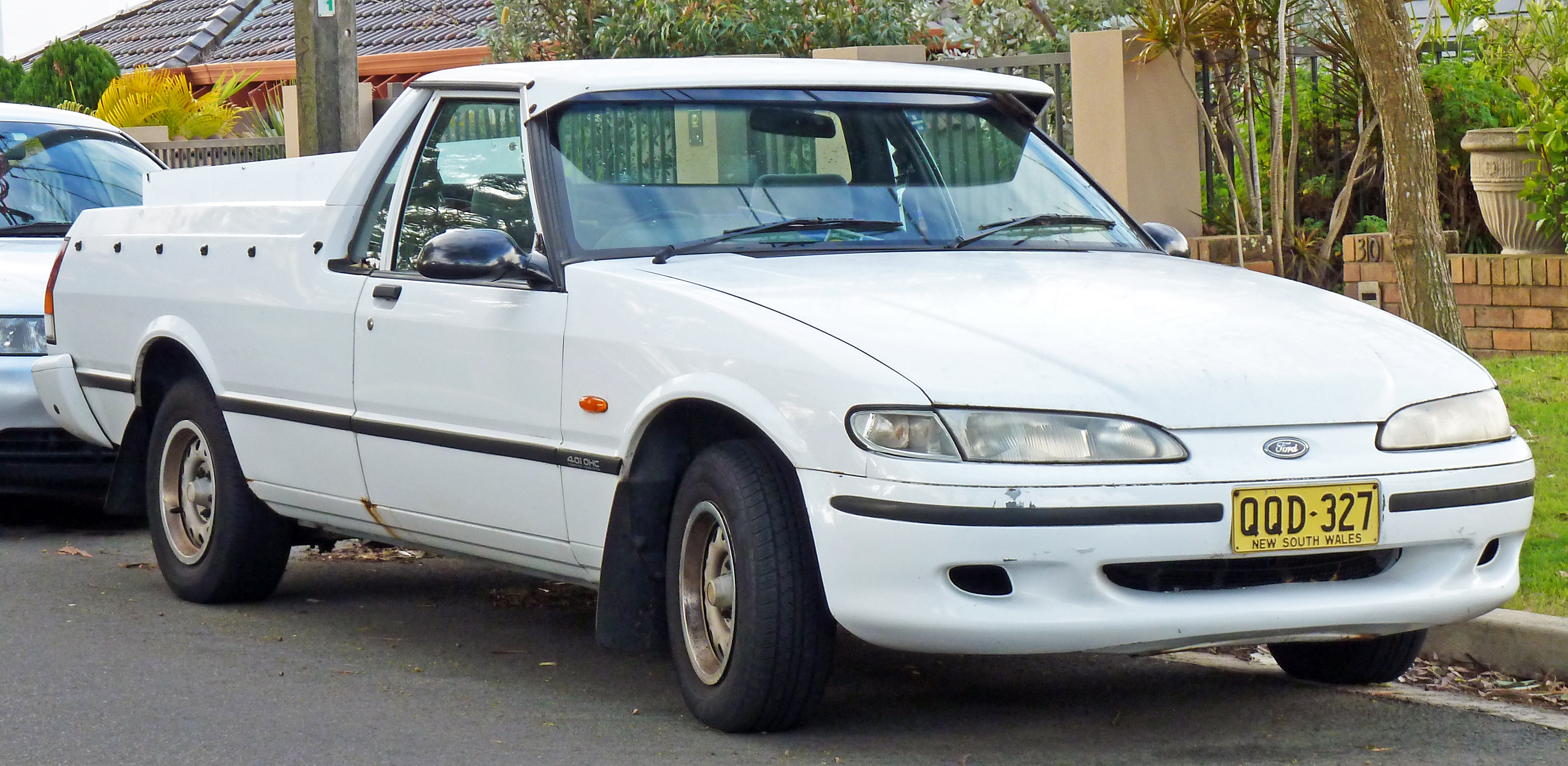
- Ford Falcon (XH) Longreach GLi utility

Overview
- Manufacturer: Ford Australia
- Production: April 1996 – June 1999

Body and chassis
- Body style: 2-door coupe utility 2-door panel van
- Layout: Front-engine, rear-wheel-drive
- Related: Ford Falcon (EL)

Powertrain
- Engine: 4.0 L Ford I6 (petrol); 5.0 L Windsor V8 (petrol)
- Transmission: 4-speed M93LE automatic (I6); 4-speed M97LE automatic (V8); 5-speed manual

Dimensions
- Wheelbase: 2,957 mm (116.4 in)
- Length: 4,923 mm (193.8 in)
- Width: 1,862 mm (73.3 in)
- Height: 1,370 mm (53.9 in)
- Kerb weight: 1,520 kg (3,351 lb)

Chronology
- Predecessor: Ford Falcon (XG)
- Successor: Ford Falcon (AU)

The Ford Falcon (XH) is a commercial range of vehicles that was manufactured by Ford Australia from 1996 to 1999, as an upgrade to the XG series of utility and panel van models which were derived from the XF full-size car and had been marketed alongside the new series sedans since the EA26 project release in 1988. The XH incarnation brought closer levels of technology and comfort in comparison to the current sedan range on offer (EL), and was also the first Falcon utility vehicle to offer a V8 engine option in approximately fourteen years (more than four years later than the E series sedan range which reintroduced a V8 in 1992 in the form of the 5.0 (Windsor 302ci) sequential EFI V8 utilising EECIV engine management as seen in Ford US Mustang models).

== Introduction ==
The Ford XH Falcon was introduced in April 1996 as a facelift of the Ford XG Falcon, which it replaced. Like the XG series, it was offered only in coupe utility and panel van body styles. The XH series was sold alongside the EF Falcon sedan and wagon models until October 1996, and with the facelifted EL Falcon sedan and wagons from that point as well as early in the AU Falcon production run.

Ford grafted the nose of its EF Falcon sedan/wagon on to the existing XG Falcon, giving it the appearance of a new model. A new bonnet with a raised centre section was also fitted, along with a rounder roof. Improvements included revised front suspension and steering, revised rear suspension, upgraded engines, revised seats, a new instrumentation pod and upgraded interior trim.

== Model range ==
The XH range was offered in 2-door coupe utility and 2-door panel van models, marketed as follows.

- Ford Falcon Longreach GLi utility
- Ford Falcon Longreach GLi panel van
- Ford Falcon Longreach S utility
- Ford Falcon Longreach Outback utility
- Ford Falcon XR6 utility
- Ford Falcon XR8 utility (from October 1997)

GLi utility and vans were available with a "1 Tonne" option pack that included heavier rear leaf springs, uprated tyres and an automatic transmission oil cooler.

There were also several limited edition XH models:

- Longreach GLi Tradesman: adding air conditioning, vinyl bed liner, 15 inch alloy wheels, Tradesman decals, remote central locking. Sold between May and June 1997, with 520 utilities and 80 vans produced. Reintroduced between October 1998 and June 1999, with 820 utilities and 80 vans produced.
- Longreach S Splash (utility): adding to the S model an alloy sports bar, alloy wheels (as per EF Fairmont Ghia), cruise control, and leather steering wheel. Sold between July 1997 and November 1998, with 300 produced.
- Longreach GLi Special Edition (utility): adding air conditioning, alloy wheels, and "Special Edition" decals. Sold between December 1998 and June 1999, with 600 produced.
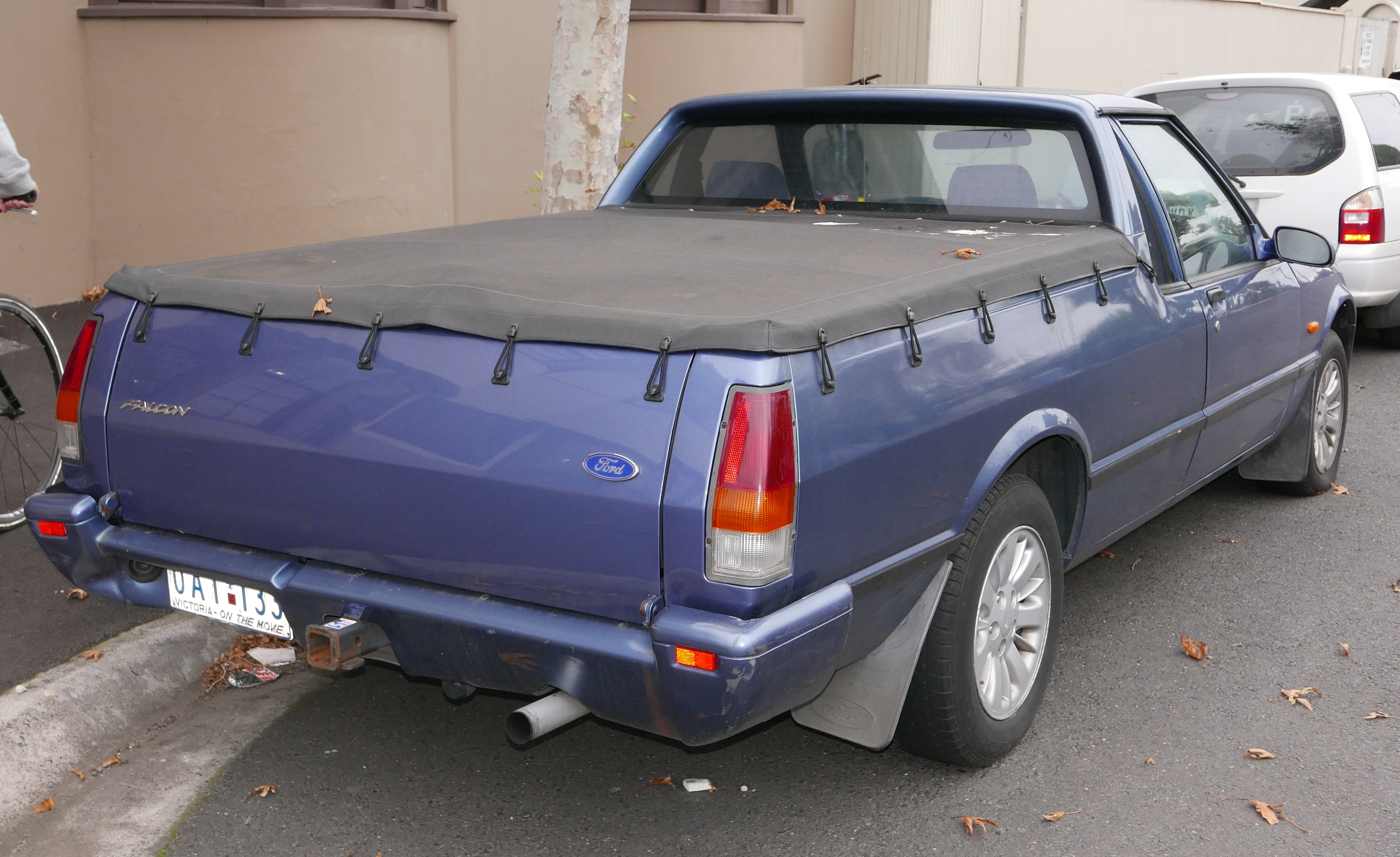
Ford Falcon (XH) Longreach S utility

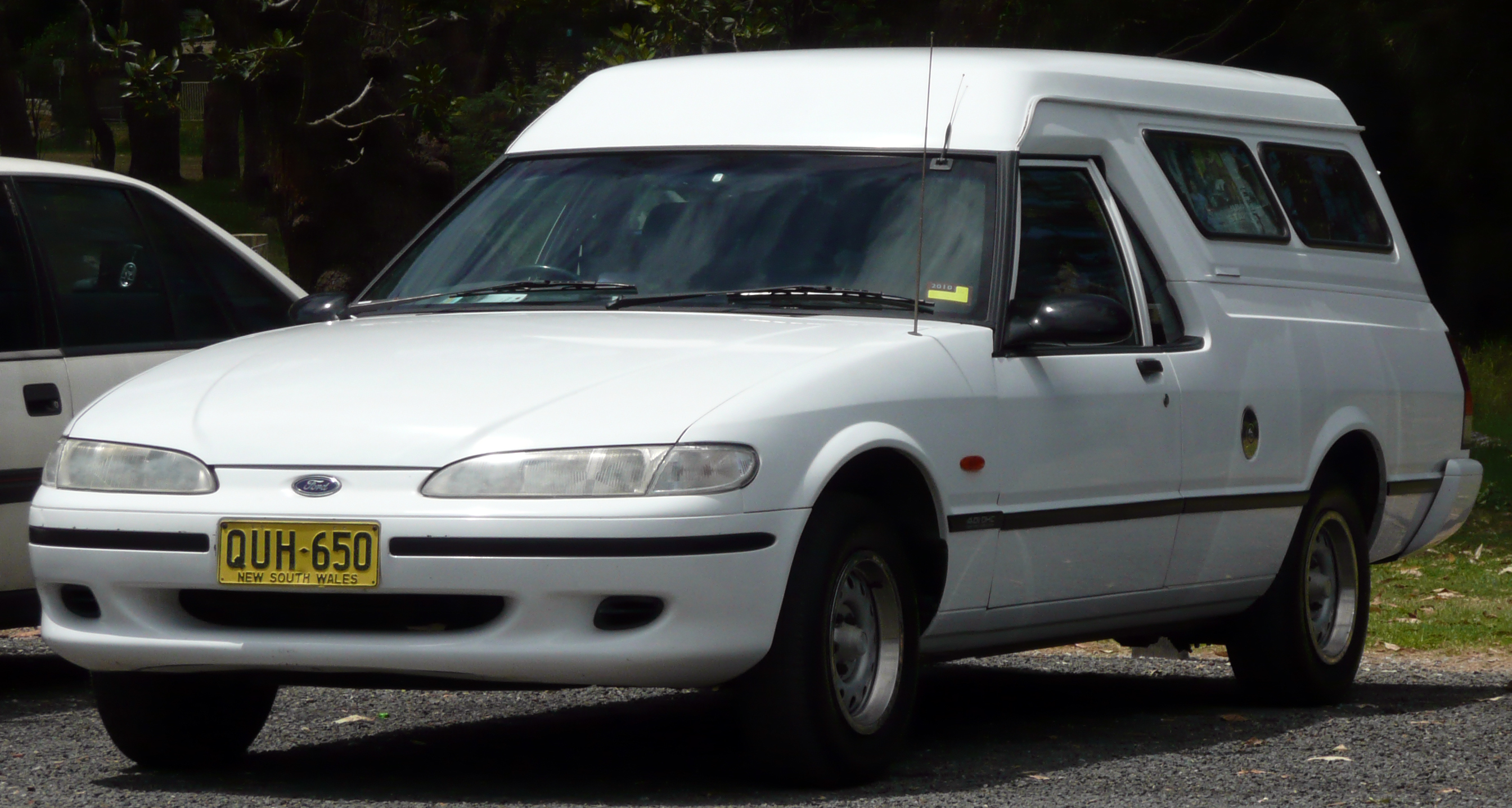
Ford Falcon (XH) Longreach GLi panel van

== XH Series II ==
An upgraded XH Series II range was introduced in October 1997, A 5.0 litre V8 engine was added as an option for the Automatic S Ute and was fitted as standard equipment in the newly introduced XR8 model, 624 XR8 utes were produced during the production run with 212 being manual. Both the new XR8 and the revised XR6 featured the nosecone design from the EL series Falcon XR8 Sedan.

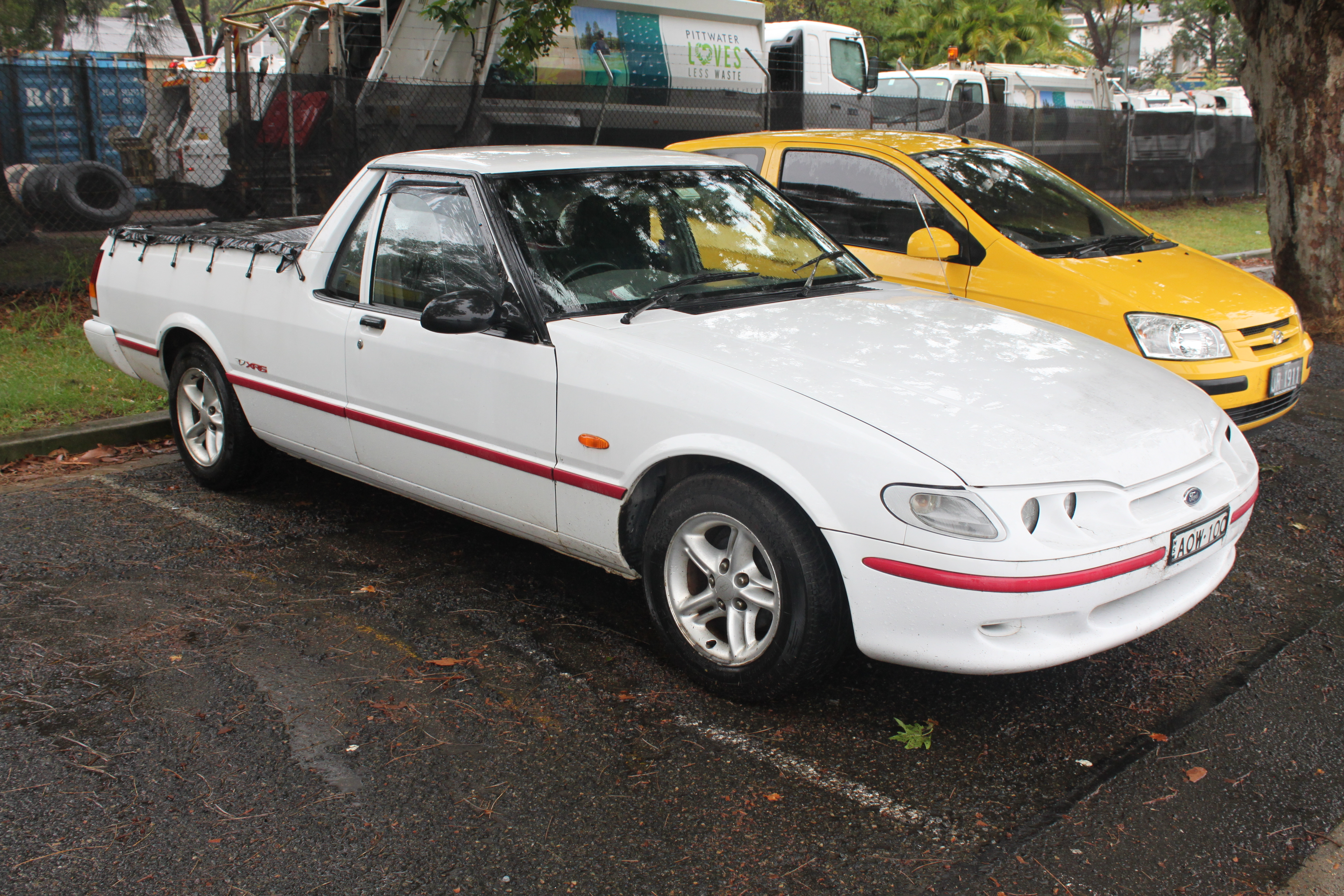
Ford Falcon (XH II) XR6 utility

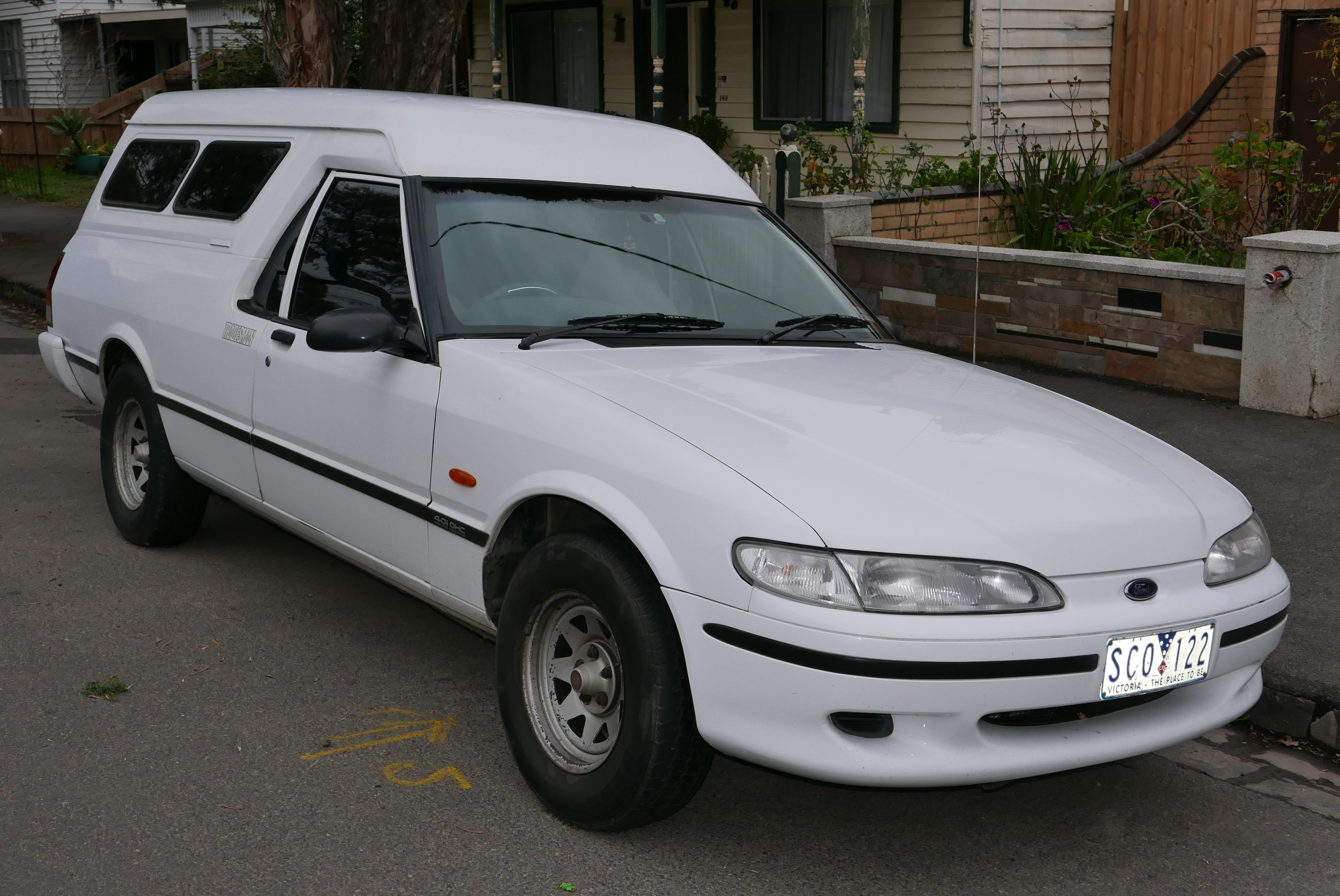
Ford Falcon (XH II) Longreach GLi Tradesman 1 Tonne panel van

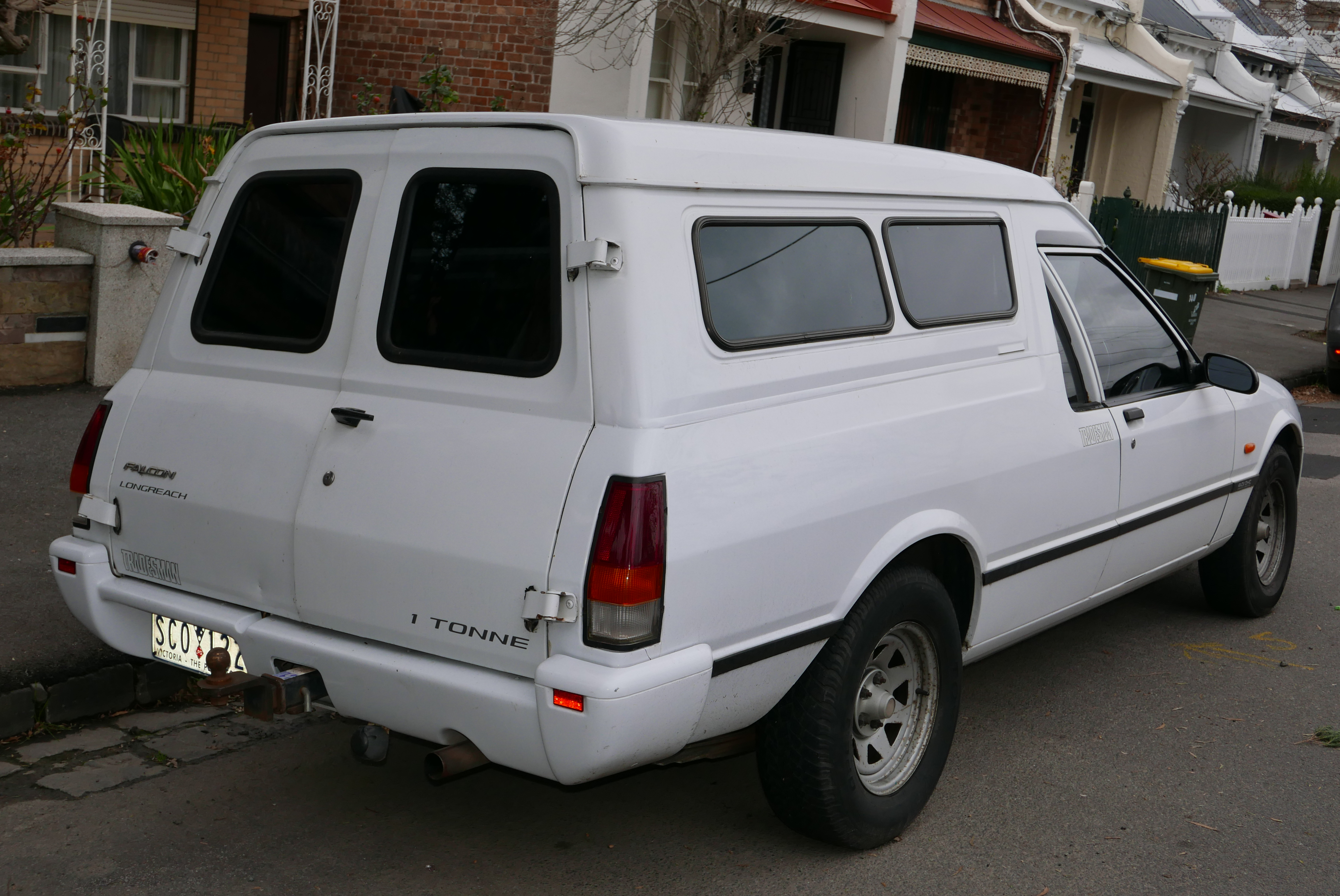
Ford Falcon (XH II) Longreach GLi Tradesman 1 Tonne panel van

== Terra concept ==
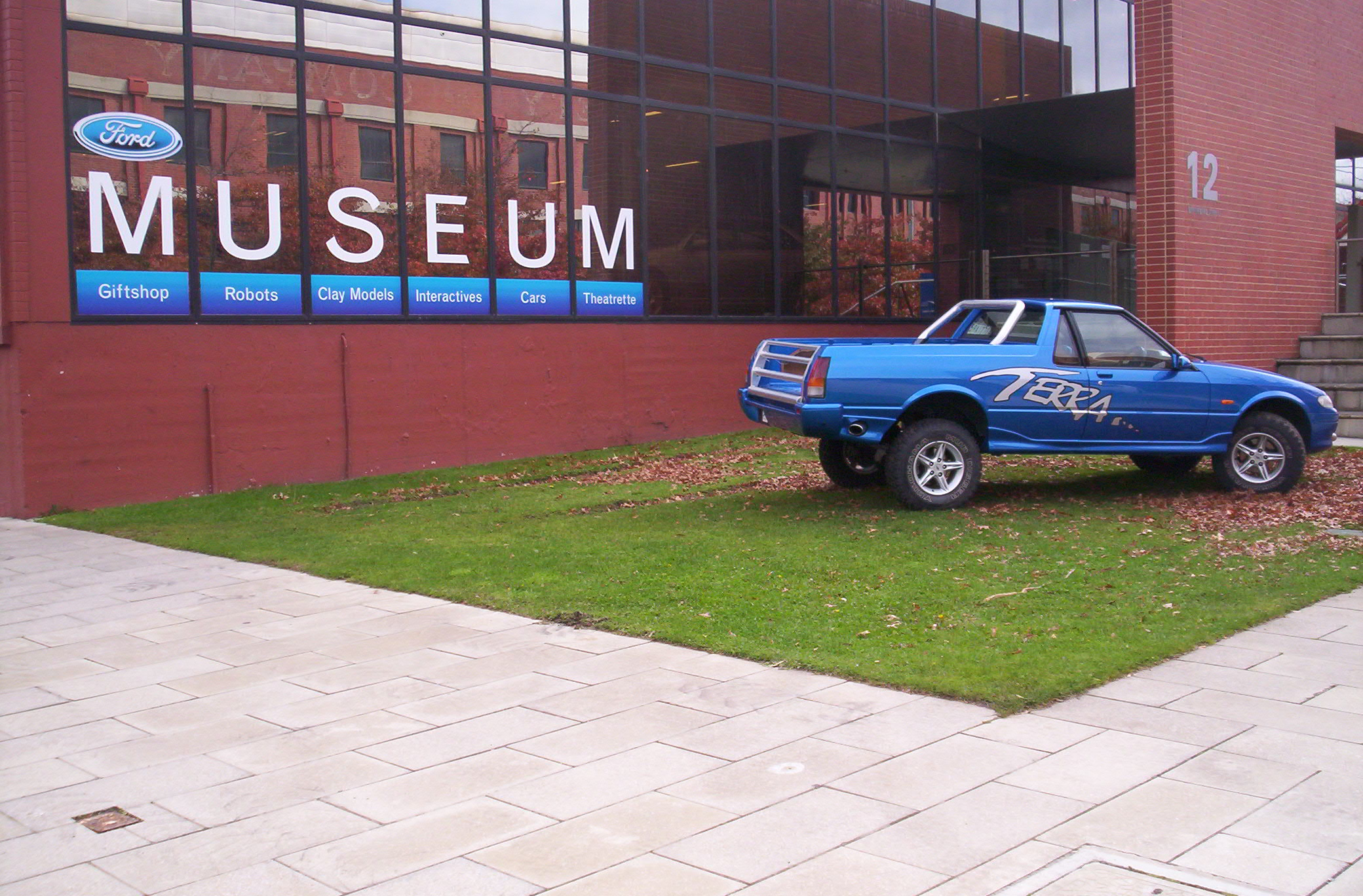
Terra concept outside of the Ford Discovery Centre

The Terra concept was unveiled at the 1997 Melbourne Motor Show, it was developed in partnership with Royal Melbourne Institute of Technology (RMIT) design students. It was based on a regular Falcon Utility powered by a 4.0-litre straight six, the Terra added 15-inch alloy wheels, raised suspension by 40 mm (1.6 in), sports bar, overhead driving lamps, and a skeleton of a tailgate made from bars similar in design to the sports bar. It was made in rear-wheel-drive.

== Replacement ==
The XH Falcon Ute models were replaced in June 1999 by Ute variants of the AU Falcon range. By that time, the XH models were relatively unrefined and antiquated, as the basic design dated back to the XD Falcon of 1979. The XH Van was discontinued and was not replaced, bringing to an end the 38-year history of the Australian "Falcon Van", which began with the XK Falcon two-door panel-van model in 1961.
