= 1998 ATCC Lakeside round =

Round 7 of 10 in the 1998 Australian Touring Car Championship

(Queensland) 1998 ATCC Lakeside round
Event Information
- Round 3 of 10 in the 1998 Australian Touring Car Championship
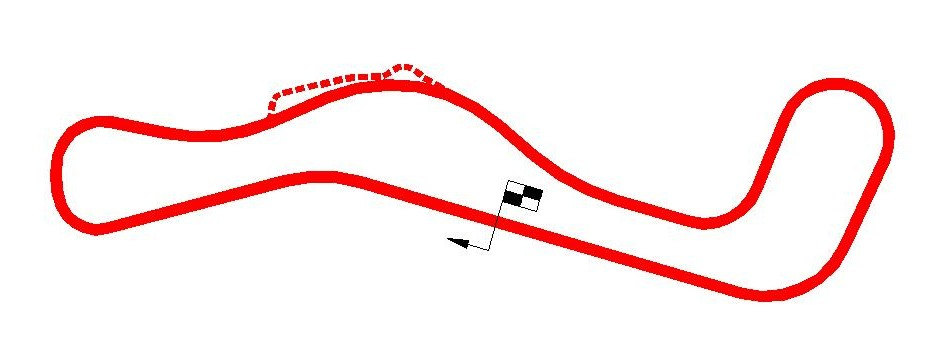
- Date: 27–29 March 1998
- Location: Kurwongbah, Queensland
- Venue: Lakeside International Raceway
- Weather: Sunny

Results
Race 1
| Distance | 18 laps | 40 km |
| Pole position | John Bowe; Dick Johnson Racing | 50.2973 |
| Winner | John Bowe; Dick Johnson Racing | 20:09.7693 |
Race 2
| Distance | 23 laps | 50 km |
| Winner | Russell Ingall; Perkins Engineering | 20:01.5807 |
Race 3
| Distance | 23 laps | 50 km |
| Winner | Russell Ingall; Perkins Engineering | 20:03.8338 |
Round Results
| First | Russell Ingall; Perkins Engineering | 114 pts |
| Second | Dick Johnson; Dick Johnson Racing | 110 pts |
| Third | Larry Perkins; Perkins Engineering | 100 pts |

The 1998 ATCC Lakeside round was the third round of the 1998 Australian Touring Car Championship. It was held on the weekend of 27 to 29 March at Lakeside International Raceway in Kurwongbah, Queensland. This was the final ATCC/V8 Supercar event to be held at the Queensland venue.

In what was the final Australian Touring Car round to be held at the Queensland venue, the weekend saw a closely-fought battle for supremacy between the drivers of Dick Johnson Racing and Perkins Engineering. John Bowe won the first race while Russell Ingall won the second and third races. Bowe's weekend was curtailed by a retirement in race two and the battle for round honours went down between Ingall and hometown hero Dick Johnson.

== Background ==
The event was held on the weekend of 27 to 29 March 1998. It was the 29th and final ATCC/V8 Supercar event to be held at Lakeside International Raceway and consisted of three 50 km sprint races.

=== Entry list ===
A total of 32 drivers entered into the weekend.

Trevor Ashby took over the Lansvale Racing Team entry from Steve Reed, continuing their long-standing rotating schedule. Danny Osbourne, Richard Mork, Mick Donaher and John Briggs returned to the series after missing the previous round in Tasmania.

Multiple drivers made their first appearances for the season including Rodney Forbes for Glenn Seton Racing, Kevin Heffernan with PACE Racing, Tomas Mezera with Challenge Motorsport, Alan Jones with Longhurst Racing, Charles Ryman and Rod Nash.

This round marked the final ATCC appearance for Kerryn Brewer. This would also be the last appearance of the season for Steven Richards who would venture to the United Kingdom to assume a role with the Nissan British Super Touring team.

== Race report ==
=== Qualifying ===
| Pos | No | Name | Team | Vehicle | Time |
|---|---|---|---|---|---|
| 1 | 18 | (Australia) John Bowe | Dick Johnson Racing | Ford Falcon (EL) | 50.2973 |
| 2 | 17 | (Australia) Dick Johnson | Dick Johnson Racing | Ford Falcon (EL) | 50.8048 |
| 3 | 25 | (Australia) Tony Longhurst | Longhurst Racing | Ford Falcon (EL) | 50.8213 |
| 4 | 4 | (Australia) Jason Bright | Stone Brothers Racing | Ford Falcon (EL) | 50.8752 |
| 5 | 8 | (Australia) Russell Ingall | Perkins Engineering | Holden Commodore (VS) | 50.8781 |
| 6 | 11 | (Australia) Larry Perkins | Perkins Engineering | Holden Commodore (VS) | 51.1867 |
| 7 | 46 | (New Zealand) John Faulkner | John Faulkner Racing | Holden Commodore (VS) | 51.2469 |
| 8 | 10 | (Australia) Mark Larkham | Larkham Motorsport | Ford Falcon (EL) | 51.3336 |
| 9 | 1 | (Australia) Glenn Seton | Glenn Seton Racing | Ford Falcon (EL) | 51.4189 |
| 10 | 15 | (Australia) Craig Lowndes | Holden Racing Team | Holden Commodore (VS) | 51.4304 |
| 11 | 24 | (Australia) Paul Romano | Romano Racing | Holden Commodore (VS) | 51.4786 |
| 12 | 50 | (Australia) Mark Skaife | Holden Racing Team | Holden Commodore (VS) | 51.5202 |
| 13 | 34 | (New Zealand) Steven Richards | Garry Rogers Motorsport | Holden Commodore (VS) | 51.5732 |
| 14 | 2 | (Australia) Steven Ellery | Holden Young Lions | Holden Commodore (VS) | 51.6073 |
| 15 | 9 | (Australia) Alan Jones | Longhurst Racing | Ford Falcon (EL) | 51.7427 |
| 16 | 31 | (Australia) Darren Pate | Gibson Motorsport | Holden Commodore (VS) | 51.7472 |
| 17 | 35 | (Australia) Jason Bargwanna | Garry Rogers Motorsport | Holden Commodore (VS) | 51.8009 |
| 18 | 27 | (Australia) Terry Finnigan | Terry Finnigan | Holden Commodore (VS) | 51.8551 |
| 19 | 7 | (Australia) Darren Hossack | Gibson Motorsport | Holden Commodore (VS) | 51.9413 |
| 20 | 32 | (Australia) Tomas Mezera | Challenge Motorsport | Holden Commodore (VS) | 52.3586 |
| 21 | 49 | (Australia) Greg Crick | Greg Crick Motorsport | Holden Commodore (VS) | 52.4554 |
| 22 | 70 | (Australia) John Briggs | Briggs Motorsport | Ford Falcon (EL) | 52.5760 |
| 23 | 3 | (Australia) Trevor Ashby | Lansvale Racing Team | Holden Commodore (VS) | 53.2221 |
| 24 | 74 | (Australia) Kevin Heffernan | PACE Racing | Holden Commodore (VS) | 53.2865 |
| 25 | 13 | (Australia) Ryan McLeod | Cadillac Productions | Ford Falcon (EL) | 53.2977 |
| 26 | 43 | (Australia) Paul Weel | Paul Weel Racing | Ford Falcon (EL) | 53.6090 |
| 27 | 22 | (Australia) Danny Osbourne | Colourscan Motorsport | Ford Falcon (EL) | 53.6981 |
| 28 | 55 | (Australia) Rod Nash | Rod Nash Racing | Holden Commodore (VS) | 53.9253 |
| 29 | 19 | (Australia) Kerryn Brewer | Perkins Engineering | Holden Commodore (VS) | 54.2310 |
| 30 | 51 | (Australia) Charles Ryman | Charles Ryman | Ford Falcon (EL) | 54.7980 |
| 31 | 77 | (Australia) Richard Mork | V8 Racing | Holden Commodore (VP) | 55.4080 |
| | 28 | (Australia) Rodney Forbes | Glenn Seton Racing | Ford Falcon (EL) | no time |

=== Privateers sprint ===
| Pos. | No. | Name | Team | Vehicle | Laps | Time / Retired | Grid |
|---|---|---|---|---|---|---|---|
| 1 | 74 | (Australia) Kevin Heffernan | PACE Racing | Holden Commodore (VS) | 8 | 7:17.6264 | |
| 2 | 32 | (Australia) Tomas Mezera | Challenge Motorsport | Holden Commodore (VS) | 8 | + 0.087 | |
| 3 | 22 | (Australia) Danny Osbourne | Colourscan Motorsport | Ford Falcon (EL) | 8 | + 6.320 | |
| 4 | 3 | (Australia) Trevor Ashby | Lansvale Racing Team | Holden Commodore (VS) | 8 | + 6.487 | |
| 5 | 19 | (Australia) Kerryn Brewer | Perkins Engineering | Holden Commodore (VS) | 8 | + 13.463 | |
| 6 | 80 | (Australia) Michael Donaher | Clive Wiseman Racing | Holden Commodore (VS) | 8 | + 18.073 | |
| 7 | 77 | (Australia) Richard Mork | V8 Racing | Holden Commodore (VP) | 8 | + 26.931 | |
| 8 | 51 | (Australia) Charles Ryman | Charles Ryman | Ford Falcon (EL) | 8 | + 27.101 | |
| 9 | 55 | (Australia) Rod Nash | Rod Nash Racing | Holden Commodore (VS) | 8 | + 37.554 | |
| NC | 13 | (Australia) Ryan McLeod | Cadillac Productions | Ford Falcon (EL) | 5 | + 3 laps | |
| Ret | 49 | (Australia) Greg Crick | Greg Crick Motorsport | Holden Commodore (VS) | 6 | Retired | |
| Ret | 70 | (Australia) John Briggs | Briggs Motorsport | Ford Falcon (EL) | 1 | Retired | |
Fastest Lap: Trevor Ashby (Lansvale Racing Team) - 52.6331 on lap 5

=== Race 1 ===
| Pos. | No. | Name | Team | Vehicle | Laps | Time / Retired | Grid |
|---|---|---|---|---|---|---|---|
| 1 | 18 | (Australia) John Bowe | Dick Johnson Racing | Ford Falcon (EL) | 23 | 20:09.7693 | 1 |
| 2 | 17 | (Australia) Dick Johnson | Dick Johnson Racing | Ford Falcon (EL) | 23 | + 0.381 | 2 |
| 3 | 8 | (Australia) Russell Ingall | Perkins Engineering | Holden Commodore (VS) | 23 | + 0.656 | 5 |
| 4 | 11 | (Australia) Larry Perkins | Perkins Engineering | Holden Commodore (VS) | 23 | + 2.097 | 6 |
| 5 | 25 | (Australia) Tony Longhurst | Longhurst Racing | Ford Falcon (EL) | 23 | + 11.586 | 3 |
| 6 | 15 | (Australia) Craig Lowndes | Holden Racing Team | Holden Commodore (VS) | 23 | + 12.064 | 10 |
| 7 | 4 | (Australia) Jason Bright | Stone Brothers Racing | Ford Falcon (EL) | 23 | + 13.593 | 4 |
| 8 | 46 | (New Zealand) John Faulkner | John Faulkner Racing | Holden Commodore (VS) | 23 | + 20.930 | 7 |
| 9 | 9 | (Australia) Alan Jones | Longhurst Racing | Ford Falcon (EL) | 23 | + 22.581 | 15 |
| 10 | 35 | (Australia) Jason Bargwanna | Garry Rogers Motorsport | Holden Commodore (VS) | 23 | + 23.118 | 17 |
| 11 | 27 | (Australia) Terry Finnigan | Terry Finnigan | Holden Commodore (VS) | 23 | + 23.807 | 18 |
| 12 | 2 | (Australia) Steven Ellery | Holden Young Lions | Holden Commodore (VS) | 23 | + 26.415 | 14 |
| 13 | 7 | (Australia) Darren Hossack | Gibson Motorsport | Holden Commodore (VS) | 23 | + 31.870 | 19 |
| 14 | 34 | (New Zealand) Steven Richards | Garry Rogers Motorsport | Holden Commodore (VS) | 23 | + 39.172 | 13 |
| 15 | 32 | (Australia) Tomas Mezera | Challenge Motorsport | Holden Commodore (VS) | 23 | + 39.521 | 20 |
| 16 | 1 | (Australia) Glenn Seton | Glenn Seton Racing | Ford Falcon (EL) | 23 | + 39.584 | 9 |
| 17 | 3 | (Australia) Trevor Ashby | Lansvale Racing Team | Holden Commodore (VS) | 23 | + 40.874 | 23 |
| 18 | 24 | (Australia) Paul Romano | Romano Racing | Holden Commodore (VS) | 23 | + 41.081 | 11 |
| 19 | 50 | (Australia) Mark Skaife | Holden Racing Team | Holden Commodore (VS) | 23 | + 50.154 | 12 |
| 20 | 13 | (Australia) Ryan McLeod | Cadillac Productions | Ford Falcon (EL) | 22 | + 1 lap | 25 |
| 21 | 55 | (Australia) Rod Nash | Rod Nash Racing | Holden Commodore (VS) | 21 | + 2 laps | 28 |
| 22 | 31 | (Australia) Darren Pate | Gibson Motorsport | Holden Commodore (VS) | 21 | + 2 laps | 16 |
| 23 | 43 | (Australia) Paul Weel | Paul Weel Racing | Ford Falcon (EL) | 21 | + 2 laps | 26 |
| Ret | 22 | (Australia) Danny Osbourne | Colourscan Motorsport | Ford Falcon (EL) | 18 | Retired | 27 |
| Ret | 19 | (Australia) Kerryn Brewer | Perkins Engineering | Holden Commodore (VS) | 13 | Retired | 29 |
| Ret | 10 | (Australia) Mark Larkham | Larkham Motorsport | Ford Falcon (EL) | 11 | Retired | 8 |
| Ret | 74 | (Australia) Kevin Heffernan | PACE Racing | Holden Commodore (VS) | 5 | Retired | 24 |
| Ret | 49 | (Australia) Greg Crick | Greg Crick Motorsport | Holden Commodore (VS) | 3 | Retired | 21 |
| Ret | 70 | (Australia) John Briggs | Briggs Motorsport | Ford Falcon (EL) | 3 | Retired | 22 |
| DNS | 28 | (Australia) Rodney Forbes | Glenn Seton Racing | Ford Falcon (EL) | | Did not start | |
| DNS | 51 | (Australia) Charles Ryman | Charles Ryman | Ford Falcon (EL) | | Did not start | |
| DNS | 77 | (Australia) Richard Mork | V8 Racing | Holden Commodore (VP) | | Did not start | |
| DNS | 80 | (Australia) Michael Donaher | Clive Wiseman Racing | Holden Commodore (VS) | | Did not start | |
Fastest Lap: Larry Perkins (Perkins Engineering) - 51.5204 on lap 12

=== Race 2 ===
| Pos. | No. | Name | Team | Vehicle | Laps | Time / Retired | Grid |
|---|---|---|---|---|---|---|---|
| 1 | 8 | (Australia) Russell Ingall | Perkins Engineering | Holden Commodore (VS) | 23 | 20:01.5807 | 3 |
| 2 | 17 | (Australia) Dick Johnson | Dick Johnson Racing | Ford Falcon (EL) | 23 | + 2.456 | 2 |
| 3 | 11 | (Australia) Larry Perkins | Perkins Engineering | Holden Commodore (VS) | 23 | + 5.754 | 4 |
| 4 | 15 | (Australia) Craig Lowndes | Holden Racing Team | Holden Commodore (VS) | 23 | + 11.771 | 6 |
| 5 | 25 | (Australia) Tony Longhurst | Longhurst Racing | Ford Falcon (EL) | 23 | + 16.313 | 5 |
| 6 | 4 | (Australia) Jason Bright | Stone Brothers Racing | Ford Falcon (EL) | 23 | + 24.542 | 7 |
| 7 | 9 | (Australia) Alan Jones | Longhurst Racing | Ford Falcon (EL) | 23 | + 30.468 | 9 |
| 8 | 34 | (New Zealand) Steven Richards | Garry Rogers Motorsport | Holden Commodore (VS) | 23 | + 31.710 | 14 |
| 9 | 50 | (Australia) Mark Skaife | Holden Racing Team | Holden Commodore (VS) | 23 | + 32.960 | 19 |
| 10 | 2 | (Australia) Steven Ellery | Holden Young Lions | Holden Commodore (VS) | 23 | + 33.471 | 12 |
| 11 | 27 | (Australia) Terry Finnigan | Terry Finnigan | Holden Commodore (VS) | 23 | + 39.132 | 11 |
| 12 | 24 | (Australia) Paul Romano | Romano Racing | Holden Commodore (VS) | 23 | + 42.532 | 18 |
| 13 | 32 | (Australia) Tomas Mezera | Challenge Motorsport | Holden Commodore (VS) | 23 | + 44.099 | 15 |
| 14 | 10 | (Australia) Mark Larkham | Larkham Motorsport | Ford Falcon (EL) | 23 | + 44.551 | 26 |
| 15 | 3 | (Australia) Trevor Ashby | Lansvale Racing Team | Holden Commodore (VS) | 23 | + 49.067 | 17 |
| 16 | 7 | (Australia) Darren Hossack | Gibson Motorsport | Holden Commodore (VS) | 23 | + 50.279 | 13 |
| 17 | 74 | (Australia) Kevin Heffernan | PACE Racing | Holden Commodore (VS) | 22 | + 1 lap | 27 |
| 18 | 31 | (Australia) Darren Pate | Gibson Motorsport | Holden Commodore (VS) | 22 | + 1 lap | 22 |
| 19 | 70 | (Australia) John Briggs | Briggs Motorsport | Ford Falcon (EL) | 22 | + 1 lap | 27 |
| 20 | 43 | (Australia) Paul Weel | Paul Weel Racing | Ford Falcon (EL) | 22 | + 1 lap | 23 |
| 21 | 13 | (Australia) Ryan McLeod | Cadillac Productions | Ford Falcon (EL) | 22 | + 1 lap | 20 |
| 22 | 19 | (Australia) Kerryn Brewer | Perkins Engineering | Holden Commodore (VS) | 22 | + 1 lap | 25 |
| 23 | 35 | (Australia) Jason Bargwanna | Garry Rogers Motorsport | Holden Commodore (VS) | 22 | + 1 lap | 10 |
| 24 | 55 | (Australia) Rod Nash | Rod Nash Racing | Holden Commodore (VS) | 21 | + 2 laps | 21 |
| 25 | 22 | (Australia) Danny Osbourne | Colourscan Motorsport | Ford Falcon (EL) | 21 | + 2 laps | 24 |
| Ret | 46 | (New Zealand) John Faulkner | John Faulkner Racing | Holden Commodore (VS) | 18 | Retired | 8 |
| Ret | 51 | (Australia) Charles Ryman | Charles Ryman | Ford Falcon (EL) | 13 | Retired | 28 |
| Ret | 1 | (Australia) Glenn Seton | Glenn Seton Racing | Ford Falcon (EL) | 9 | Retired | 16 |
| Ret | 18 | (Australia) John Bowe | Dick Johnson Racing | Ford Falcon (EL) | 6 | Retired | 1 |
| DNS | 28 | (Australia) Rodney Forbes | Glenn Seton Racing | Ford Falcon (EL) | | Did not start | |
| DNS | 49 | (Australia) Greg Crick | Greg Crick Motorsport | Holden Commodore (VS) | | Did not start | |
| DNS | 77 | (Australia) Richard Mork | V8 Racing | Holden Commodore (VP) | | Did not start | |
| DNS | 80 | (Australia) Michael Donaher | Clive Wiseman Racing | Holden Commodore (VS) | | Did not start | |
Fastest Lap: Russell Ingall (Perkins Engineering) - 51.5347 on lap 6

=== Race 3 ===
| Pos. | No. | Name | Team | Vehicle | Laps | Time / Retired | Grid |
|---|---|---|---|---|---|---|---|
| 1 | 8 | (Australia) Russell Ingall | Perkins Engineering | Holden Commodore (VS) | 23 | 20:03.8338 | 1 |
| 2 | 17 | (Australia) Dick Johnson | Dick Johnson Racing | Ford Falcon (EL) | 23 | + 2.373 | 2 |
| 3 | 11 | (Australia) Larry Perkins | Perkins Engineering | Holden Commodore (VS) | 23 | + 4.652 | 3 |
| 4 | 15 | (Australia) Craig Lowndes | Holden Racing Team | Holden Commodore (VS) | 23 | + 8.501 | 4 |
| 5 | 25 | (Australia) Tony Longhurst | Longhurst Racing | Ford Falcon (EL) | 23 | + 13.512 | 5 |
| 6 | 34 | (New Zealand) Steven Richards | Garry Rogers Motorsport | Holden Commodore (VS) | 23 | + 14.933 | 8 |
| 7 | 50 | (Australia) Mark Skaife | Holden Racing Team | Holden Commodore (VS) | 23 | + 15.357 | 9 |
| 8 | 18 | (Australia) John Bowe | Dick Johnson Racing | Ford Falcon (EL) | 23 | + 17.346 | 29 |
| 9 | 24 | (Australia) Paul Romano | Romano Racing | Holden Commodore (VS) | 23 | + 19.984 | 12 |
| 10 | 27 | (Australia) Terry Finnigan | Terry Finnigan | Holden Commodore (VS) | 23 | + 28.000 | 11 |
| 11 | 10 | (Australia) Mark Larkham | Larkham Motorsport | Ford Falcon (EL) | 23 | + 30.381 | 14 |
| 12 | 4 | (Australia) Jason Bright | Stone Brothers Racing | Ford Falcon (EL) | 23 | + 31.544 | 6 |
| 13 | 35 | (Australia) Jason Bargwanna | Garry Rogers Motorsport | Holden Commodore (VS) | 23 | + 31.735 | 23 |
| 14 | 31 | (Australia) Darren Pate | Gibson Motorsport | Holden Commodore (VS) | 23 | + 40.627 | 18 |
| 15 | 3 | (Australia) Trevor Ashby | Lansvale Racing Team | Holden Commodore (VS) | 23 | + 57.607 | 15 |
| 16 | 43 | (Australia) Paul Weel | Paul Weel Racing | Ford Falcon (EL) | 22 | + 1 lap | 20 |
| 17 | 22 | (Australia) Danny Osbourne | Colourscan Motorsport | Ford Falcon (EL) | 22 | + 1 lap | 25 |
| 18 | 1 | (Australia) Glenn Seton | Glenn Seton Racing | Ford Falcon (EL) | 22 | + 1 lap | 27 |
| 19 | 74 | (Australia) Kevin Heffernan | PACE Racing | Holden Commodore (VS) | 22 | + 1 lap | 17 |
| 20 | 9 | (Australia) Alan Jones | Longhurst Racing | Ford Falcon (EL) | 21 | + 2 laps | 7 |
| 21 | 19 | (Australia) Kerryn Brewer | Perkins Engineering | Holden Commodore (VS) | 21 | + 2 laps | 22 |
| 22 | 55 | (Australia) Rod Nash | Rod Nash Racing | Holden Commodore (VS) | 21 | + 2 laps | 24 |
| Ret | 46 | (New Zealand) John Faulkner | John Faulkner Racing | Holden Commodore (VS) | 15 | Retired | 26 |
| Ret | 70 | (Australia) John Briggs | Briggs Motorsport | Ford Falcon (EL) | 12 | Retired | 19 |
| Ret | 32 | (Australia) Tomas Mezera | Challenge Motorsport | Holden Commodore (VS) | 11 | Retired | 13 |
| Ret | 7 | (Australia) Darren Hossack | Gibson Motorsport | Holden Commodore (VS) | 7 | Retired | 16 |
| Ret | 2 | (Australia) Steven Ellery | Holden Young Lions | Holden Commodore (VS) | 6 | Retired | 10 |
| Ret | 51 | (Australia) Charles Ryman | Charles Ryman | Ford Falcon (EL) | 6 | Retired | 27 |
| Ret | 13 | (Australia) Ryan McLeod | Cadillac Productions | Ford Falcon (EL) | 5 | Retired | 21 |
| DNS | 28 | (Australia) Rodney Forbes | Glenn Seton Racing | Ford Falcon (EL) | | Did not start | |
| DNS | 49 | (Australia) Greg Crick | Greg Crick Motorsport | Holden Commodore (VS) | | Did not start | |
| DNS | 77 | (Australia) Richard Mork | V8 Racing | Holden Commodore (VP) | | Did not start | |
| DNS | 80 | (Australia) Michael Donaher | Clive Wiseman Racing | Holden Commodore (VS) | | Did not start | |
Fastest Lap: Russell Ingall (Perkins Engineering) - 51.5573 on lap 10

== Championship points ==
Drivers' Championship standings after Round 3

| Pos. | No | Driver | Team | Pts |
|---|---|---|---|---|
| 1 | 15 | (Australia) Craig Lowndes | Holden Racing Team | 322 |
| 2 | 8 | (Australia) Russell Ingall | Perkins Engineering | 286 |
| 3 | 11 | (Australia) Larry Perkins | Perkins Engineering | 270 |
| 4 | 17 | (Australia) Dick Johnson | Dick Johnson Racing | 238 |
| 5 | 50 | (Australia) Mark Skaife | Holden Racing Team | 236 |
