= 1998 ATCC Launceston round =

Round 2 of 10 in the 1998 Australian Touring Car Championship

(Tasmania) 1998 ATCC Launceston round
Event Information
- Round 2 of 10 in the 1998 Australian Touring Car Championship
- Date: 6–8 Feb 1998
- Location: Launceston, Tasmania
- Venue: Symmons Plains Raceway
- Weather: Sunny

Results
Race 1
Distance	22 laps	50 km
Pole position	Mark Skaife; Holden Racing Team	54.2725
Winner	Glenn Seton; Glenn Seton Racing	20:29.0230
Race 2
Distance	22 laps	50 km
Winner	Craig Lowndes; Holden Racing Team	20:31.5346
Race 3
Distance	22 laps	50 km
Winner	Craig Lowndes; Holden Racing Team	20:35.9806
Round Results
First	Craig Lowndes; Holden Racing Team	114 pts
Second	Mark Skaife; Holden Racing Team	108 pts
Third	Jason Bargwanna; Garry Rogers Motorsport	96 pts

The 1998 ATCC Launceston round was the fourth round of the 1998 Australian Touring Car Championship. It was held on the weekend of 6 to 8 February at Symmons Plains Raceway in Launceston, Tasmania.

Craig Lowndes carried on his form from Sandown to win two out of the three races and took overall round honours for the second round in succession. Holden Racing Team teammate Mark Skaife claimed pole position for the first race and a string of second-place finishes allowed him to finish second for the round. Third was claimed by the Jason Bargwanna of Garry Rogers Motorsport in what was just his second weekend as a V8 Supercar driver. Defending champion Glenn Seton won the first race but a retirement in the second race curtailed his weekend.

== Background ==
The event was held on the weekend of 6 to 8 February 1998. It was the 28th ATCC/V8 Supercar event to be held at Symmons Plains Raceway and consisted of three 50 km sprint races.

=== Entry list ===
A total of 27 drivers entered into the weekend.

The Lansvale Racing Team entry was piloted by Steve Reed, substituting for Trevor Ashby in their rotating roster schedule. Kerryn Brewer made her season debut for Perkins Engineering. Ryan McLeod, D'Arcy Russell and Peter Doulman also made their first appearances for the season in this round.

== Race report ==
=== Qualifying ===
Pos	No	Name	Team	Vehicle	Time
1	50	(Australia) Mark Skaife	Holden Racing Team	Holden Commodore (VS)	54.2725
2	1	(Australia) Glenn Seton	Glenn Seton Racing	Ford Falcon (EL)	54.4830
3	4	(Australia) Jason Bright	Stone Brothers Racing	Ford Falcon (EL)	54.5389
4	15	(Australia) Craig Lowndes	Holden Racing Team	Holden Commodore (VS)	54.5474
5	18	(Australia) John Bowe	Dick Johnson Racing	Ford Falcon (EL)	54.7454
6	8	(Australia) Russell Ingall	Perkins Engineering	Holden Commodore (VS)	54.7995
7	34	(New Zealand) Steven Richards	Garry Rogers Motorsport	Holden Commodore (VS)	54.8517
8	17	(Australia) Dick Johnson	Dick Johnson Racing	Ford Falcon (EL)	54.9855
9	24	(Australia) Paul Romano	Romano Racing	Holden Commodore (VS)	54.9891
10	35	(Australia) Jason Bargwanna	Garry Rogers Motorsport	Holden Commodore (VS)	55.0090
11	11	(Australia) Larry Perkins	Perkins Engineering	Holden Commodore (VS)	55.0111
12	10	(Australia) Mark Larkham	Larkham Motorsport	Ford Falcon (EL)	55.1391
13	46	(New Zealand) John Faulkner	Glenn Seton Racing	Ford Falcon (EL)	55.2665
14	25	(Australia) Tony Longhurst	Longhurst Racing	Ford Falcon (EL)	55.2779
15	2	(Australia) Steven Ellery	Holden Young Lions	Holden Commodore (VS)	55.8211
16	49	(Australia) Greg Crick	Greg Crick Motorsport	Holden Commodore (VS)	56.4524
17	7	(Australia) Darren Hossack	Gibson Motorsport	Holden Commodore (VS)	56.5927
18	29	(Australia) Peter Doulman	M3 Motorsport	Holden Commodore (VS)	56.6135
19	27	(Australia) Terry Finnigan	Terry Finnigan	Holden Commodore (VS)	56.7652
20	23	(Australia) Ray Hislop	Ray Hislop	Ford Falcon (EF)	56.8587
21	13	(Australia) Ryan McLeod	Cadillac Productions	Holden Commodore (VS)	57.0065
22	31	(Australia) Darren Pate	Gibson Motorsport	Holden Commodore (VS)	57.0569
23	6	(Australia) Steve Reed	Lansvale Racing Team	Holden Commodore (VS)	57.1706
24	19	(Australia) Kerryn Brewer	Perkins Engineering	Holden Commodore (VS)	57.3508
25	43	(Australia) Paul Weel	Paul Weel Racing	Ford Falcon (EL)	57.3657
26	48	(Australia) D'Arcy Russell	Rod Smith Racing	Holden Commodore (VS)	58.5497
	44	(Australia) Mal Rose	Mal Rose Racing	Holden Commodore (VS)	no time

=== Privateers Sprint ===
Steve Reed made the best start of everyone to jump into an early lead. Greg Crick passed Ray Hislop before the end of the first lap and quickly caught up to Reed by the end of lap two. Both Reed and Crick made side-to-side contact on the back straight on lap three that almost sent both drivers into the undergrowth. On the final lap, Crick performed the switchback on the exit of the hairpin to take the lead, and ultimate the race win, from Reed.

Pos.	No.	Name	Team	Vehicle	Laps	Time / Retired	Grid
1	49	(Australia) Greg Crick	Greg Crick Motorsport	Holden Commodore (VS)	4	3:52.3136	4
2	6	(Australia) Steve Reed	Lansvale Racing Team	Holden Commodore (VS)	4	+ 0.587	2
3	23	(Australia) Ray Hislop	Ray Hislop	Ford Falcon (EF)	4	+ 0.889	3
4	29	(Australia) Peter Doulman	M3 Motorsport	Holden Commodore (VS)	4	+ 1.749	1
5	13	(Australia) Ryan McLeod	Cadillac Productions	Ford Falcon (EL)	4	+ 3.776	6
6	43	(Australia) Paul Weel	Paul Weel Racing	Ford Falcon (EL)	4	+ 6.062	8
7	44	(Australia) Mal Rose	Mal Rose Racing	Holden Commodore (VS)	4	+ 6.318	9
8	19	(Australia) Kerryn Brewer	Perkins Engineering	Holden Commodore (VS)	4	+ 6.919	5
9	48	(Australia) D'Arcy Russell	Rod Smith Racing	Holden Commodore (VS)	4	+ 11.500	7
Fastest Lap: Greg Crick (Greg Crick Motorsport) - 56.2663 on lap 2

=== Race 1 ===
Pos.	No.	Name	Team	Vehicle	Laps	Time / Retired	Grid
1	1	(Australia) Glenn Seton	Glenn Seton Racing	Ford Falcon (EL)	22	20:29.0230	
2	50	(Australia) Mark Skaife	Holden Racing Team	Holden Commodore (VS)	22	+ 1.656	
3	15	(Australia) Craig Lowndes	Holden Racing Team	Holden Commodore (VS)	22	+ 2.073	
4	8	(Australia) Russell Ingall	Perkins Engineering	Holden Commodore (VS)	22	+ 13.629	
5	35	(Australia) Jason Bargwanna	Garry Rogers Motorsport	Holden Commodore (VS)	22	+ 14.529	
6	17	(Australia) Dick Johnson	Dick Johnson Racing	Ford Falcon (EL)	22	+ 27.373	
7	4	(Australia) Jason Bright	Stone Brothers Racing	Ford Falcon (EL)	22	+ 30.075	
8	11	(Australia) Larry Perkins	Perkins Engineering	Holden Commodore (VS)	22	+ 32.944	
9	24	(Australia) Paul Romano	Romano Racing	Holden Commodore (VS)	22	+ 33.275	
10	49	(Australia) Greg Crick	Greg Crick Motorsport	Holden Commodore (VS)	22	+ 52.028	
11	25	(Australia) Tony Longhurst	Longhurst Racing	Ford Falcon (EL)	21	+ 1 lap	
12	6	(Australia) Steve Reed	Lansvale Racing Team	Holden Commodore (VS)	21	+ 1 lap	
13	23	(Australia) Ray Hislop	Ray Hislop	Ford Falcon (EF)	21	+ 1 lap	
14	7	(Australia) Darren Hossack	Gibson Motorsport	Holden Commodore (VS)	21	+ 1 lap	
15	29	(Australia) Peter Doulman	M3 Motorsport	Holden Commodore (VS)	21	+ 1 lap	
16	19	(Australia) Kerryn Brewer	Perkins Engineering	Holden Commodore (VS)	21	+ 1 lap	
17	34	(New Zealand) Steven Richards	Garry Rogers Motorsport	Holden Commodore (VS)	21	+ 1 lap	
18	2	(Australia) Steven Ellery	Holden Young Lions	Holden Commodore (VS)	21	+ 1 lap	
19	31	(Australia) Darren Pate	Gibson Motorsport	Holden Commodore (VS)	21	+ 1 lap	
20	43	(Australia) Paul Weel	Paul Weel Racing	Ford Falcon (EL)	20	+ 2 laps	
21	48	(Australia) D'Arcy Russell	Rod Smith Racing	Holden Commodore (VS)	20	+ 2 laps	
22	46	(New Zealand) John Faulkner	John Faulkner Racing	Holden Commodore (VS)	21	+ 1 lap	
23	44	(Australia) Mal Rose	Mal Rose Racing	Holden Commodore (VS)	16	+ 6 laps	
Ret	10	(Australia) Mark Larkham	Larkham Motorsport	Ford Falcon (EL)	12	Retired	
Ret	27	(Australia) Terry Finnigan	Terry Finnigan	Holden Commodore (VS)	12	Retired	
Ret	13	(Australia) Ryan McLeod	Cadillac Productions	Ford Falcon (EB)	11	Retired	
Ret	18	(Australia) John Bowe	Dick Johnson Racing	Ford Falcon (EL)	9	Retired	
Fastest Lap: Glenn Seton (Glenn Seton Racing) - 54.8357 on lap 6

=== Race 2 ===
Pos.	No.	Name	Team	Vehicle	Laps	Time / Retired	Grid
1	15	(Australia) Craig Lowndes	Holden Racing Team	Holden Commodore (VS)	22	20:31.5346	3
2	50	(Australia) Mark Skaife	Holden Racing Team	Holden Commodore (VS)	22	+ 3.149	2
3	8	(Australia) Russell Ingall	Perkins Engineering	Holden Commodore (VS)	22	+ 3.796	4
4	35	(Australia) Jason Bargwanna	Garry Rogers Motorsport	Holden Commodore (VS)	22	+ 4.947	5
5	4	(Australia) Jason Bright	Stone Brothers Racing	Ford Falcon (EL)	22	+ 9.328	7
6	11	(Australia) Larry Perkins	Perkins Engineering	Holden Commodore (VS)	22	+ 20.800	8
7	18	(Australia) John Bowe	Dick Johnson Racing	Ford Falcon (EL)	22	+ 21.862	27
8	24	(Australia) Paul Romano	Romano Racing	Holden Commodore (VS)	22	+ 22.780	9
9	34	(New Zealand) Steven Richards	Garry Rogers Motorsport	Holden Commodore (VS)	22	+ 26.781	17
10	17	(Australia) Dick Johnson	Dick Johnson Racing	Ford Falcon (EL)	22	+ 29.548	6
11	10	(Australia) Mark Larkham	Larkham Motorsport	Ford Falcon (EL)	22	+ 30.520	24
12	49	(Australia) Greg Crick	Greg Crick Motorsport	Holden Commodore (VS)	22	+ 50.576	10
13	27	(Australia) Terry Finnigan	Terry Finnigan	Holden Commodore (VS)	21	+ 1 lap	25
14	29	(Australia) Peter Doulman	M3 Motorsport	Holden Commodore (VS)	21	+ 1 lap	15
15	7	(Australia) Darren Hossack	Gibson Motorsport	Holden Commodore (VS)	21	+ 1 lap	14
16	13	(Australia) Ryan McLeod	Cadillac Productions	Ford Falcon (EB)	21	+ 1 lap	26
17	19	(Australia) Kerryn Brewer	Perkins Engineering	Holden Commodore (VS)	21	+ 1 lap	16
18	44	(Australia) Mal Rose	Mal Rose Racing	Holden Commodore (VS)	21	+ 1 lap	23
19	31	(Australia) Darren Pate	Gibson Motorsport	Holden Commodore (VS)	21	+ 1 lap	19
20	6	(Australia) Steve Reed	Lansvale Racing Team	Holden Commodore (VS)	21	+ 1 lap	12
21	48	(Australia) D'Arcy Russell	Rod Smith Racing	Holden Commodore (VS)	21	+ 1 lap	21
22	25	(Australia) Tony Longhurst	Longhurst Racing	Ford Falcon (EL)	21	+ 1 lap	11
Ret	46	(New Zealand) John Faulkner	John Faulkner Racing	Holden Commodore (VS)	13	Retired	22
Ret	1	(Australia) Glenn Seton	Glenn Seton Racing	Ford Falcon (EL)	12	Retired	1
Ret	43	(Australia) Paul Weel	Paul Weel Racing	Ford Falcon (EL)	11	Retired	20
Ret	23	(Australia) Ray Hislop	Ray Hislop	Ford Falcon (EF)	6	Retired	13
Ret	2	(Australia) Steven Ellery	Holden Young Lions	Holden Commodore (VS)	6	Retired	18
Fastest Lap: Craig Lowndes (Holden Racing Team) - 55.1865 on lap 4

=== Race 3 ===
Pos.	No.	Name	Team	Vehicle	Laps	Time / Retired	Grid
1	15	(Australia) Craig Lowndes	Holden Racing Team	Holden Commodore (VS)	22	20:35.9806	1
2	50	(Australia) Mark Skaife	Holden Racing Team	Holden Commodore (VS)	22	+ 9.863	2
3	35	(Australia) Jason Bargwanna	Garry Rogers Motorsport	Holden Commodore (VS)	22	+ 10.558	4
4	4	(Australia) Jason Bright	Stone Brothers Racing	Ford Falcon (EL)	22	+ 14.745	5
5	1	(Australia) Glenn Seton	Glenn Seton Racing	Ford Falcon (EL)	22	+ 15.843	24
6	11	(Australia) Larry Perkins	Perkins Engineering	Holden Commodore (VS)	22	+ 17.111	6
7	8	(Australia) Russell Ingall	Perkins Engineering	Holden Commodore (VS)	22	+ 17.882	3
8	34	(New Zealand) Steven Richards	Garry Rogers Motorsport	Holden Commodore (VS)	22	+ 20.496	9
9	17	(Australia) Dick Johnson	Dick Johnson Racing	Ford Falcon (EL)	22	+ 23.867	10
10	46	(New Zealand) John Faulkner	John Faulkner Racing	Holden Commodore (VS)	22	+ 24.638	23
11	18	(Australia) John Bowe	Dick Johnson Racing	Ford Falcon (EL)	22	+ 28.170	7
12	49	(Australia) Greg Crick	Greg Crick Motorsport	Holden Commodore (VS)	22	+ 42.210	12
13	10	(Australia) Mark Larkham	Larkham Motorsport	Ford Falcon (EL)	22	+ 45.039	11
14	6	(Australia) Steve Reed	Lansvale Racing Team	Holden Commodore (VS)	22	+ 54.773	20
15	25	(Australia) Tony Longhurst	Longhurst Racing	Ford Falcon (EL)	22	+ 55.580	22
16	7	(Australia) Darren Hossack	Gibson Motorsport	Holden Commodore (VS)	21	+ 1 lap	15
17	2	(Australia) Steven Ellery	Holden Young Lions	Holden Commodore (VS)	21	+ 1 lap	27
18	29	(Australia) Peter Doulman	M3 Motorsport	Holden Commodore (VS)	21	+ 1 lap	14
19	31	(Australia) Darren Pate	Gibson Motorsport	Holden Commodore (VS)	21	+ 1 lap	19
20	27	(Australia) Terry Finnigan	Terry Finnigan	Holden Commodore (VS)	21	+ 1 lap	13
21	44	(Australia) Mal Rose	Mal Rose Racing	Holden Commodore (VS)	21	+ 1 lap	18
22	43	(Australia) Paul Weel	Paul Weel Racing	Ford Falcon (EL)	21	+ 1 lap	25
23	48	(Australia) D'Arcy Russell	Rod Smith Racing	Holden Commodore (VS)	21	+ 1 lap	21
24	19	(Australia) Kerryn Brewer	Perkins Engineering	Holden Commodore (VS)	20	+ 2 laps	17
Ret	24	(Australia) Paul Romano	Romano Racing	Holden Commodore (VS)	20	Retired	8
Ret	23	(Australia) Ray Hislop	Ray Hislop	Ford Falcon (EF)	15	Retired	26
Ret	13	(Australia) Ryan McLeod	Cadillac Productions	Ford Falcon (EB)	9	Retired	16
Fastest Lap: Craig Lowndes (Holden Racing Team) - 54.9226 on lap 3

== Championship points ==
Drivers' Championship standings after Round 2

Pos.	No	Driver	Team	Pts
1	15	(Australia) Craig Lowndes	Holden Racing Team	230
2	50	(Australia) Mark Skaife	Holden Racing Team	186
3	8	(Australia) Russell Ingall	Perkins Engineering	172
4	1	(Australia) Glenn Seton	Glenn Seton Racing	172
5	11	(Australia) Larry Perkins	Perkins Engineering	170
