= 1998 Australian Touring Car Championship =

Motor racing competition

Seasons
- ← 1997 1999 →

The 1998 Australian Touring Car Championship was an Australian motor racing competition open to 5.0 Litre Touring Cars, (also known as V8 Supercars). The championship, which was sanctioned by the Confederation of Australian Motor Sport as an Australian title, was contested over a ten-round series which began on 1 February 1998 at Sandown International Motor Raceway and ended on 2 August at Oran Park International Raceway. The series was promoted as the "Shell Australian Touring Car Championship". The title, which was the 39th Australian Touring Car Championship, was won by Craig Lowndes.

== Teams and drivers ==
The following teams and drivers competed in the championship. Entries listed as "L1" competed for the overall championship, whereas those denoted "L2" also competed for the Privateers' Teams Cup. All privateers were required to use a 'control' Yokohama tyre.

Team	Car	Class	Tyre	No	Drivers	Events
Glenn Seton Racing	Ford Falcon EL	L1	B	1	(Australia) Glenn Seton	All
Glenn Seton Racing	Ford Falcon EL	L1	B	28	(Australia) Rodney Forbes	3
Glenn Seton Racing	Ford Falcon EL	L1	B	111	(Australia) Neil Crompton	6, 8, 10
Holden Young Lions	Holden Commodore (VS)	L1	Y	2	(Australia) Steve Ellery	All
Gibson Motorsport	Holden Commodore (VS)	L1	Y	7	(Australia) Darren Hossack	1–7
Gibson Motorsport	Holden Commodore (VS)	L1	Y	32	(Australia) Tomas Mezera	8–10
Gibson Motorsport	Holden Commodore (VS)	L1	Y	31	(Australia) Darren Pate	All
Lansvale Smash Repairs	Holden Commodore (VS)	L2	Y	3	(Australia) Trevor Ashby	1, 3, 7–8, 10
Lansvale Smash Repairs	Holden Commodore (VS)	L2	Y	6	(Australia) Steve Reed	2, 4–6, 9
Stone Brothers Racing	Ford Falcon EL	L1	B	4	(Australia) Jason Bright	All
Perkins Engineering	Holden Commodore (VS); Holden Commodore VT	L1	D	8	(Australia) Russell Ingall	All
Perkins Engineering	Holden Commodore (VS); Holden Commodore VT	L1	D	11	(Australia) Larry Perkins	All
Perkins Engineering	Holden Commodore (VS)	L2	Y	16	(Australia) Melinda Price	1, 4–5
Perkins Engineering	Holden Commodore (VS)	L2	Y	19	(Australia) Kerryn Brewer	2–3
Longhurst Racing	Ford Falcon EL	L1	Y	9	(Australia) Alan Jones	3–10
Longhurst Racing	Ford Falcon EL	L1	Y	25	(Australia) Tony Longhurst	All
Larkham Motorsport	Ford Falcon EL	L1	B	10	(Australia) Mark Larkham	All
Cadillac Productions	Ford Falcon EL	L2	Y	13	(Australia) Ryan McLeod	2–4, 6
Cadillac Productions	Ford Falcon EL	L2	Y	79	(Australia) Mike Conway	1, 5, 10
Imrie Motorsport	Holden Commodore (VS)	L2\	Y	14	(Australia) Mike Imrie	4–5, 8–10
Holden Racing Team	Holden Commodore (VS); Holden Commodore VT	L1	B	15	(Australia) Craig Lowndes	All
Holden Racing Team	Holden Commodore (VS)	L1	B	50	(Australia) Mark Skaife	All
Holden Racing Team	Holden Commodore VT	L1	B	98	(New Zealand) Greg Murphy	8
Dick Johnson Racing	Ford Falcon EL	L1	D	17	(Australia) Dick Johnson	All
Dick Johnson Racing	Ford Falcon EL	L1	D	18	(Australia) John Bowe	All
Dick Johnson Racing	Ford Falcon EL	L1	D	95	(Australia) Steven Johnson	4–8, 10
Colourscan Motorsport	Ford Falcon EL	L2	Y	22	(Australia) Danny Osborne	1, 3–7, 9–10
Colourscan Motorsport	Ford Falcon EL	L2	Y	47	(Australia) Brett Peters	9
Ray Hislop	Ford Falcon EF	L2	Y	23	(Australia) Ray Hislop	1–2, 8
Romano Racing	Holden Commodore (VS)	L1	B	24	(Australia) Paul Romano	All
M3 Motorsport	Holden Commodore (VS)	L2	Y	26	(Australia) John Cotter	10
M3 Motorsport	Holden Commodore (VS)	L2	Y	29	(Australia) Peter Doulman	2, 5
Terry Finnigan	Holden Commodore (VS)	L1	D	27	(Australia) Terry Finnigan	1–3, 5–7, 9–10
Challenge Motorsport	Holden Commodore (VS)	L2	Y	32	(Australia) Tomas Mezera	3–4
Challenge Motorsport	Holden Commodore (VS)	L2	Y	39	(Australia) Chris Smerdon	1, 5–6, 8–10
Garry Rogers Motorsport	Holden Commodore (VS)	L1	B	34	(New Zealand) Steven Richards	1–3
Garry Rogers Motorsport	Holden Commodore (VS)	L1	B	134	(Australia) Garth Tander	4–10
Garry Rogers Motorsport	Holden Commodore (VS)	L1	B	35	(Australia) Jason Bargwanna	All
Schembri Motorsport	Holden Commodore (VS)	L2	Y	36	(Australia) Neil Schembri	10
Schembri Motorsport	Holden Commodore (VS)	L2	Y	71	(Australia) Gary Quartly	5, 8
James Rosenberg Racing	Holden Commodore (VS)	L1	B	38	(Australia) Mark Poole	1, 4, 6, 8–10
Simon Emerzidis	Holden Commodore VR	L2	Y	41	(Australia) Garry Willmington	1
Simon Emerzidis	Holden Commodore (VS)	L2	Y	54	(Australia) Simon Emerzidis	4–5, 8, 10
Paul Weel Racing	Ford Falcon EL	L2	Y	43	(Australia) Paul Weel	1–6, 9–10
Mal Rose Racing	Holden Commodore (VS)	L2	Y	44	(Australia) Mal Rose	1–2, 4–9
Novocastrian Motorsport	Holden Commodore (VS)	L2	Y	45	(Australia) Wayne Russell	4, 6
John Faulkner Racing	Holden Commodore (VS)	L1	B	46	(New Zealand) John Faulkner	All
Rod Smith Racing	Holden Commodore (VS)	L2	Y	48	(Australia) D'Arcy Russell	2, 4–9
Greg Crick Motorsport	Holden Commodore (VS)	L2	Y	49	(Australia) Greg Crick	1–3, 5, 7, 9–10
Greg Crick Motorsport	Holden Commodore (VS)	L2	Y	149	(Australia) Dean Crosswell	6, 8
Charles Ryman	Ford Falcon EL	L2	Y	51	(Australia) Charles Ryman	3, 5–6, 9
Barry Morcom	Holden Commodore VP	L2	Y	52	(Australia) Barry Morcom	5–6
Rod Nash Racing	Holden Commodore (VS)	L2	Y	55	(Australia) Rod Nash	3–10
Briggs Motor Sport	Ford Falcon EL	L2	Y	70	(Australia) John Briggs	1, 3, 6–7, 9–10
Robert Smith Racing	Holden Commodore (VS)	L2	Y	72	(Australia) Robert Smith	8–10
PACE Racing	Holden Commodore (VS)	L2	Y	74	(Australia) Kevin Heffernan	3–5, 9
Paul Little Racing	Ford Falcon EL	L2	Y	75	(Australia) Anthony Tratt	4–6, 8, 10
V8 Racing	Holden Commodore VP	L2	Y	77	(Australia) Richard Mork	1, 3, 5, 10
Clive Wiseman Racing	Holden Commodore (VS)	L2	Y	80	(Australia) Mick Donaher	1, 3, 5, 8, 10
Don Pulver	Holden Commodore VP	L2	Y	88	(Australia) Don Pulver	1
Geoff Kendrick	Holden Commodore (VS)	L2	Y	92	(Australia) Geoff Kendrick	7, 9

== Race calendar ==
The championship was contested over a ten-round series with three races per round.

Rd.	Race title	Circuit	Location / state	Date	Winner	Car	Team	Report
1	(Australia) Sandown	Sandown International Motor Raceway	Melbourne, Victoria	30 Jan – 1 Feb	Craig Lowndes	Holden VS Commodore	Holden Racing Team	
2	(Australia) Launceston	Symmons Plains International Raceway	Launceston, Tasmania	6–8 Feb	Craig Lowndes	Holden VS Commodore	Holden Racing Team	Report
3	(Australia) Lakeside	Lakeside International Raceway	Brisbane, Queensland	27–29 Mar	Russell Ingall	Holden VS Commodore	Perkins Engineering	Report
4	(Australia) Phillip Island	Phillip Island Grand Prix Circuit	Phillip Island, Victoria	17–19 Apr	Craig Lowndes	Holden VS Commodore	Holden Racing Team	
5	(Australia) Winton	Winton Motor Raceway	Benalla, Victoria	1–3 May	John Bowe	Ford EL Falcon	Dick Johnson Racing	
6	(Australia) Mallala	Mallala Motor Sport Park	Mallala, South Australia	22–24 May	Russell Ingall	Holden VS Commodore	Perkins Engineering	Report
7	(Australia) Barbagallo	Barbagallo Raceway	Perth, Western Australia	29–31 May	Craig Lowndes	Holden VS Commodore	Holden Racing Team	
8	(Australia) Calder	Calder Park Raceway	Melbourne, Victoria	19–21 Jun	Craig Lowndes	Holden VS Commodore	Holden Racing Team	
9	(Australia) Hidden Valley	Hidden Valley Raceway	Darwin, Northern Territory	17–19 Jul	Russell Ingall	Holden VT Commodore	Perkins Engineering	
10	(Australia) Oran Park	Oran Park International Raceway	Sydney, New South Wales	31 Jul – 2 Aug	Craig Lowndes	Holden VT Commodore	Holden Racing Team	

Event locations

== Championship standings ==
=== Points system ===
Points were awarded to the first twenty classified finishers in each race as follows:

Race Position	1st	2nd	3rd	4th	5th	6th	7th	8th	9th	10th	11th	12th	13th	14th	15th	16th	17th	18th	19th	20th
Points	40	36	34	32	30	28	26	24	22	20	18	16	14	12	10	8	6	4	2	1

=== Standings ===
Pos.	Driver	SAN			SYM			LAK			PHI			WIN			MAL			PER			CAL			DAR			OPK			Points
Pos.	Driver	R1	R2	R3	R1	R2	R3	R1	R2	R3	R1	R2	R3	R1	R2	R3	R1	R2	R3	R1	R2	R3	R1	R2	R3	R1	R2	R3	R1	R2	R3	Points
1	(Australia) Craig Lowndes	2	1	1	3	1	1	6	4	4	2	1	2	4	3	Ret	3	3	1	1	1	1	1	2	C	1	DNS	6	1	1	1	992
2	(Australia) Russell Ingall	14	4	2	4	3	7	3	1	1	3	3	1	1	2	3	2	1	2	3	3	2	11	4	C	12	1	1	6	9	7	942
3	(Australia) Mark Skaife	7	6	8	2	2	2	19	9	7	1	2	21	6	5	2	EXC	EXC	8	2	2	3	2	5	C	2	DNS	9	2	2	2	768
4	(Australia) Larry Perkins	5	5	5	8	6	6	4	3	3	7	9	4	3	4	17	4	14	11	5	4	4	10	11	C	16	6	4	Ret	13	8	722
5	(Australia) John Bowe	1	2	4	Ret	7	11	1	Ret	8	6	5	3	2	1	1	1	11	9	16	Ret	12	7	7	C	7	DSQ	7	16	10	9	684
6	(Australia) Glenn Seton	3	3	3	1	Ret	5	16	Ret	18	4	4	8	11	14	9	7	4	3	6	7	19	5	6	C	9	5	3	5	5	Ret	676
7	(Australia) Jason Bargwanna	6	Ret	DNS	5	4	3	10	23	13	8	8	11	7	Ret	11	20	9	6	27	Ret	6	4	1	C	8	2	2	10	3	3	603
8	(Australia) Tony Longhurst	8	Ret	10	11	22	15	5	5	5	9	7	5	5	6	4	11	8	14	Ret	DNS	10	15	26	C	4	3	14	4	4	5	586
9	(Australia) Jason Bright	10	Ret	Ret	7	5	4	7	6	12	5	6	7	8	9	7	9	5	5	8	6	Ret	3	3	C	DSQ	Ret	Ret	3	Ret	13	584
10	(Australia) Dick Johnson	15	9	6	6	10	9	2	2	2	Ret	14	13	10	7	5	5	2	Ret	4	5	13	17	Ret	C	15	7	12	24	18	17	550
11	(Australia) Mark Larkham	16	7	7	Ret	11	13	Ret	14	11	12	11	16	15	15	Ret	15	10	13	12	11	8	12	8	C	3	12	5	9	7	10	474
12	(Australia) Paul Romano	9	Ret	DNS	9	8	Ret	18	12	9	14	12	15	18	8	6	12	Ret	16	7	15	EXC	21	10	C	5	4	Ret	12	8	4	418
13	(New Zealand) John Faulkner	11	Ret	DNS	22	Ret	10	8	Ret	Ret	10	10	10	12	10	Ret	8	6	7	11	10	5	Ret	Ret	C	6	Ret	DNS	11	15	12	376
14	(Australia) Garth Tander										20	15	12	19	13	16	14	22	12	9	8	9	6	9	C	21	DSQ	8	8	6	6	301
15	(Australia) Steve Ellery	12	Ret	11	18	Ret	17	12	10	Ret	29	16	30	14	12	8	13	18	24	14	14	14	14	Ret	C	11	Ret	DNS	14	11	14	266
16	(Australia) Alan Jones							9	7	20	13	13	6	13	Ret	13	10	15	Ret	13	12	24	16	16	C	10	Ret	10	23	14	Ret	261
17	(Australia) Steven Johnson										11	28	9	9	Ret	10	6	7	4	10	9	7	Ret	DNS	C				13	Ret	15	260
18	(New Zealand) Steven Richards	4	11	9	17	9	8	14	8	6																						188
19	(Australia) Terry Finnigan	23	14	12	Ret	13	20	11	11	10				16	Ret	Ret	Ret	19	17	15	13	15				DNS	DNS	DNS	Ret	16	19	159
20	(Australia) Darren Hossack	Ret	12	Ret	14	15	16	13	16	Ret	19	19	14	21	11	12	17	29	19	18	16	11										156
21	(Australia) Tomas Mezera							15	13	Ret	16	17	17										Ret	15	C	14	9	11	15	12	16	140
22	(Australia) Darren Pate	18	Ret	DNS	19	19	19	22	18	14	17	29	Ret	17	Ret	14	16	16	18	17	20	16	18	13	C	17	10	Ret	Ret	17	18	139
23	(Australia) Mark Poole	13	8	Ret							15	Ret	25				Ret	13	15				13	Ret	C	13	8	Ret	DNQ	DNQ	DNQ	124
24	(Australia) Neil Crompton																Ret	12	10				8	14	C				7	Ret	11	116
25	(Australia) Greg Crick	17	Ret	DNS	10	12	12	Ret	DNS	DNS				26	19	21				23	17	21				19	11	13	Ret	DNS	DNS	100
26	(Australia) Trevor Ashby	19	10	15				17	15	15										19	18	18	20	21	C				17	19	20	78
27	(Australia) Steve Reed				12	20	14				23	18	26	25	18	18	Ret	Ret	DNS							18	15	16				63
=	(Australia) Chris Smerdon	22	13	13										24	16	22	18	23	Ret				19	18	C	22	16	18	18	20	21	63
29	(Australia) John Briggs	25	15	14				Ret	19	Ret							19	21	25	25	19	17				28	13	15	DNS	DNS	DNS	58
30	(New Zealand) Greg Murphy																						9	12	C							38
31	(Australia) Paul Weel	20	Ret	Ret	20	Ret	22	23	20	16	28	20	18	27	Ret	15	24	28	Ret							Ret	DNS	17	Ret	22	26	32
32	(Australia) Peter Doulman				15	14	18							28	23	23																26
=	(Australia) Mal Rose	24	16	16	23	18	21				22	21	23	23	20	19	21	24	DNS	20	21	23	22	19	C	Ret	DNS	DNS				26
34	(Australia) Anthony Tratt										18	Ret	Ret	20	17	Ret	22	17	Ret				26	17	C				25	27	Ret	23
35	(Australia) Ray Hislop	21	Ret	17	13	Ret	Ret																24	23	C							20
36	(Australia) Kerryn Brewer				16	17	24	Ret	22	21																						14
37	(Australia) Danny Osborne	26	17	Ret				Ret	25	17	30	Ret	DNS	30	Ret	Ret	26	26	22	24	25	20				DNS	DNS	DNS	Ret	28	Ret	13
=	(Australia) Brett Peters																									20	14	Ret				13
39	(Australia) Rod Nash							21	24	22	24	Ret	19	22	21	20	Ret	25	21	21	24	Ret	Ret	20	C	23	17	Ret	19	21	22	12
40	(Australia) Ryan McLeod				Ret	16	Ret	20	21	Ret	21	Ret	20				DNQ	DNQ	DNQ													10
41	(Australia) Kevin Heffernan							Ret	17	19	Ret	23	22	29	Ret	Ret										Ret	Ret	Ret				8
=	(Australia) Melinda Price	27	18	18							26	22	24	Ret	22	26																8
43	(Australia) Geoff Kendrick																			22	22	Ret				24	18	20				5
44	(Australia) Richard Mork	Ret	19	19				DNQ	DNQ	DNQ				DNQ	DNQ	DNQ													DNQ	DNQ	24	4
45	(Australia) D'Arcy Russell				21	21	23				25	25	27	DNS	DNS	DNS	25	27	23	26	23	22	23	22	C	25	20	19				3
46	(Australia) Robert Smith																						DNQ	25	C	26	19	21	DNQ	DNQ	DNQ	2
=	(Australia) Dean Crosswell																23	20	20				Ret	DNS	C							2
48	(Australia) Neil Schembri																												20	DNS	DNS	1
NC	(Australia) John Cotter																												21	23	27	0
=	(Australia) Mike Imrie										27	26	31	DNS	DNS	DNS							DNQ	27	C	27	DNS	22	DNQ	DNQ	DNQ	0
=	(Australia) Mike Conway	DNQ	DNQ	DNQ										DNS	DNS	DNS													22	26	25	0
=	(Australia) Mick Donaher	DNQ	DNQ	DNQ				WD	WD	WD				31	26	24							DNQ	DNQ	C				Ret	24	23	0
=	(Australia) Simon Emerzidis										Ret	24	28	32	25	Ret							Ret	DNS	C				DNQ	25	Ret	0
=	(Australia) Gary Quartly													33	24	25							25	24	C							0
=	(Australia) Wayne Russell										Ret	27	29				28	30	Ret													0
=	(Australia) Charles Ryman							DNQ	Ret	Ret				Ret	Ret	Ret	27	31	WD							DNS	DNS	Ret				0
=	(Australia) Garry Willmington	28	Ret	DNS																												0
=	(Australia) Don Pulver	DNQ	DNQ	DNQ																												0
=	(Australia) Barry Morcom													DNQ	DNQ	DNQ	DNQ	DNQ	DNQ													0
=	(Australia) Rodney Forbes							WD	WD	WD																						0

Race three at the Calder round was abandoned before the start due to water lying on the track after a late afternoon storm.

=== Privateers' Team Cup ===
The Privateers' Team Cup was open to Level 2 teams competing with control tyres. Points were awarded on the same basis as for the actual Championship however competitors were required to nominate eight rounds at which they would compete and only their best six results from those rounds would be retained towards the Cup award. Two-driver teams were permitted to pool their points into a combined score.

The Cup was won by Lansvale Smash Repairs with the team's Holden Commodore (VS) driven by Trevor Ashby and Steve Reed.
