= Holden Commodore (VS) =

Australian full-size car

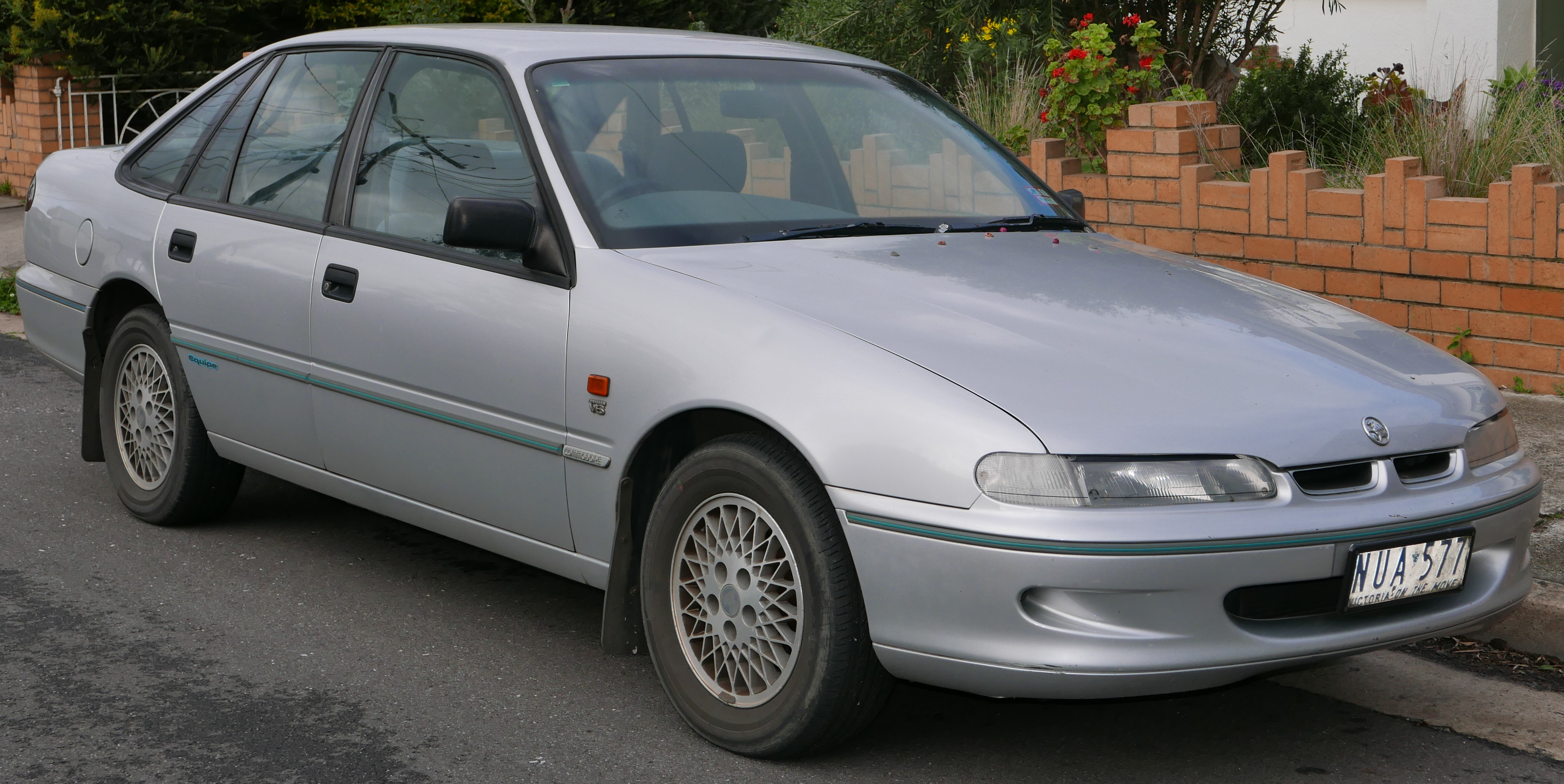
- 1996 Holden Commodore (VS) Equipe sedan

Overview
- Manufacturer: Holden (General Motors)
- Also called: Holden Berlina (VS); Holden Calais (VS); Opel Calais; Toyota Lexcen (T4/T5)
- Production: April 1995 – August 1997 (sedan, wagon); April 1995 – June 1999 (Statesman/Caprice); April 1995 – December 2000 (utility)
- Assembly: Australia: Adelaide, South Australia (Elizabeth)

Body and chassis
- Class: Full-size
- Body style: 2-door coupé utility 4-door sedan 5-door station wagon
- Platform: FR GM V platform
- Related: Holden Statesman/Caprice (VS); HSV VS series CSV VS series Opel Omega A

Powertrain
- Engine: 2.5 L C25XE V6 (export only); 3.8 L ECOTEC 3800 V6; 3.8 L Supercharged ECOTEC V6; 5.0 L 5000i "Iron Lion" V8
- Transmission: 4-speed 4L60-E automatic 5-speed Borg-Warner T-5 manual (1995–1996); 5-speed Getrag 260 manual (1996–2000)

Dimensions
- Wheelbase: Sedan: 2,731 mm (107.5 in); Wagon: 2,822 mm (111.1 in)
- Length: Sedan: 4,861 mm (191.4 in); Wagon: 4,903 mm (193.0 in)
- Width: 1,794 mm (70.6 in)
- Height: 1,476 mm (58.1 in)
- Kerb weight: 1,385–1,477 kg (3,053–3,256 lb)

Chronology
- Predecessor: Holden Commodore (VR)
- Successor: Holden Commodore (VT) (sedan, wagon); Holden Ute (VU) (utility); Lexus GS (Lexcen)

The Holden Commodore (VS) is a full-size car which was produced by Holden from 1995 to 1997 for sedans and wagons, 1995 to 1999 for the long-wheelbase Statesman/Caprice, and 1995 to 2000 for utility versions. It was the fourth and final iteration of the second generation of the Commodore. The range included the luxury variants, Holden Berlina (VS) and Holden Calais (VS).

== Overview ==
Launched in April 1995, the VS Commodore served as a mechanical update of the second generation architecture, destined to assist sales before the all-new VT model in August 1997. The extent of exterior changes veered not much further than a redesigned Holden logo and wheel trims. An updated Ecotec (Emissions and Consumption Optimisation through TEChnology) version of the Buick V6 engine coincided with the changes to the engine in the United States. The Ecotec engine packed 13 percent more power, an increase of 17 kilowatts (23 hp) over the VR, cut fuel consumption by 5 percent, and increased the compression ratio from 9.0:1 to 9.4:1. Holden mated the new engine with a modified version of the GM 4L60-E automatic transmission, bringing improved throttle response and smoother changes between gears. Safety features were also improved, with a passenger airbag becoming available.

The utility version of the VS was released in April 1995. The limited edition VS wagon with manual gearbox had a production run of 300 vehicles.

The VS Commodore was the last of which to be sold as Toyota Lexcens, as Holden and Toyota ended their model-sharing scheme. The last Lexcens were built during 1997.

== Model range ==
Here is a simple list of the original Model range.

- Executive (Base model)
- Acclaim (Added features)
- S, SS (Sports variants)
- Berlina, Calais (Luxury range)

== Series II ==
In June 1996, the Series II of the VS was launched, continuing with the new ECOTEC (Emissions and Consumption Optimisation TEChnology) 3800 V6. It was also offered with an optional passenger-side airbag, the Acclaim (Safety Pack) model being the first Australian built car to offer this feature as standard. Other changes included elliptical side turn signals, interior tweaks and the introduction of a L67 Supercharged V6 engine for Calais and Statesman trim levels only. The new supercharged engine slotted in between the existing engines in the lineup and was officially rated at 165 kW (221 hp), 3 kW (4 hp) below the V8.

From 1 January 1997, Holden's new car warranty for the VS Series II and subsequent models increased to 3 years / 100,000 km. Production of the Series II continued until the end of June 1997, when the sedan and wagon were replaced by the new Commodore VT.

== Series III ==
As the new VT did not feature a utility variant among its model range, the VS Series II Ute remained in production after the VS sedan and wagon were replaced by the new VT models in August 1997. In January 1998, an upgraded version of the Utility, the Series III, was released, which was unique in the Commodore's history as it was limited to just a single variant. The new model Ute was identified by Series III badges and clear side blinker repeater lights, and featured a number of interior upgrades.

The biggest change came in the way of the engine, as the Series II's 165 kW (221 hp) V8 was replaced by the new 179 kW (240 hp) version from the VT, which featured sequential fuel injection. Along with these changes saw the introduction of the SS V8, the first time this nameplate option was available in a Commodore utility. It was basically a test mule to see if it was a viable model to run with in the new VU model to be released. 2 Production runs of VS Series 3 SS utes were done, the first batch of 300 were fitted with the normal 5 litre engine but a second production run in 1999 saw the fitment of the upgraded VT Roller engine. Externally, the SS was identified by an integrated body kit comprising a new front bumper and side skirts, polished alloy rear sports bar, 16-inch versions of the VT SS 17-inch alloy wheels, fog lamps and SS decals. The interior featured a leather wrapped sports steering wheel, hand brake and gearshift knob, and the seats had SS identification. Power windows and air-conditioning was standard, as were the Getrag 5-speed manual transmission, limited-slip differential, sports suspension and ABS brakes.

The Series III Ute remained in production until the December 2000 release of the new Holden Ute (VU).

== Exports ==
Between 1995 and 1997, the VS was also sold in small numbers to Malaysia and Singapore as the Opel Calais. Prior to the VS, the Opel-badged models were sold in VR specification from 1994. As of December 1994, Holden were selling approximately 40 per month of the VR series Opel Calais. Both the VR and VS versions were fitted with the Opel-sourced 2.6-litre C26NE inline-six engine and four-speed 4L30-E automatic. These vehicles initially featured the front-end of the VR Statesman until a circa 1997 facelift progressed to the front-end design of the VS Caprice. The final batch of Singapore-bound Opel Calais models were produced in August 1997 and featured the newer 2.5-litre X25XE V6 engine with the 4L30-E automatic transmission. However, this order was cancelled, likely due to the imminent Asian financial crisis. As the vehicles were not compliant for sale in Australia, they were instead exported to New Zealand and retailed through Ebbett Waikato dealerships, complied as 1998 models, and rebranded as the Holden Commodore Royale. Some cars were also exported in small numbers to other markets (eg Brunei) but with specifications more similar to those of the Australia market ones.

== Gallery ==
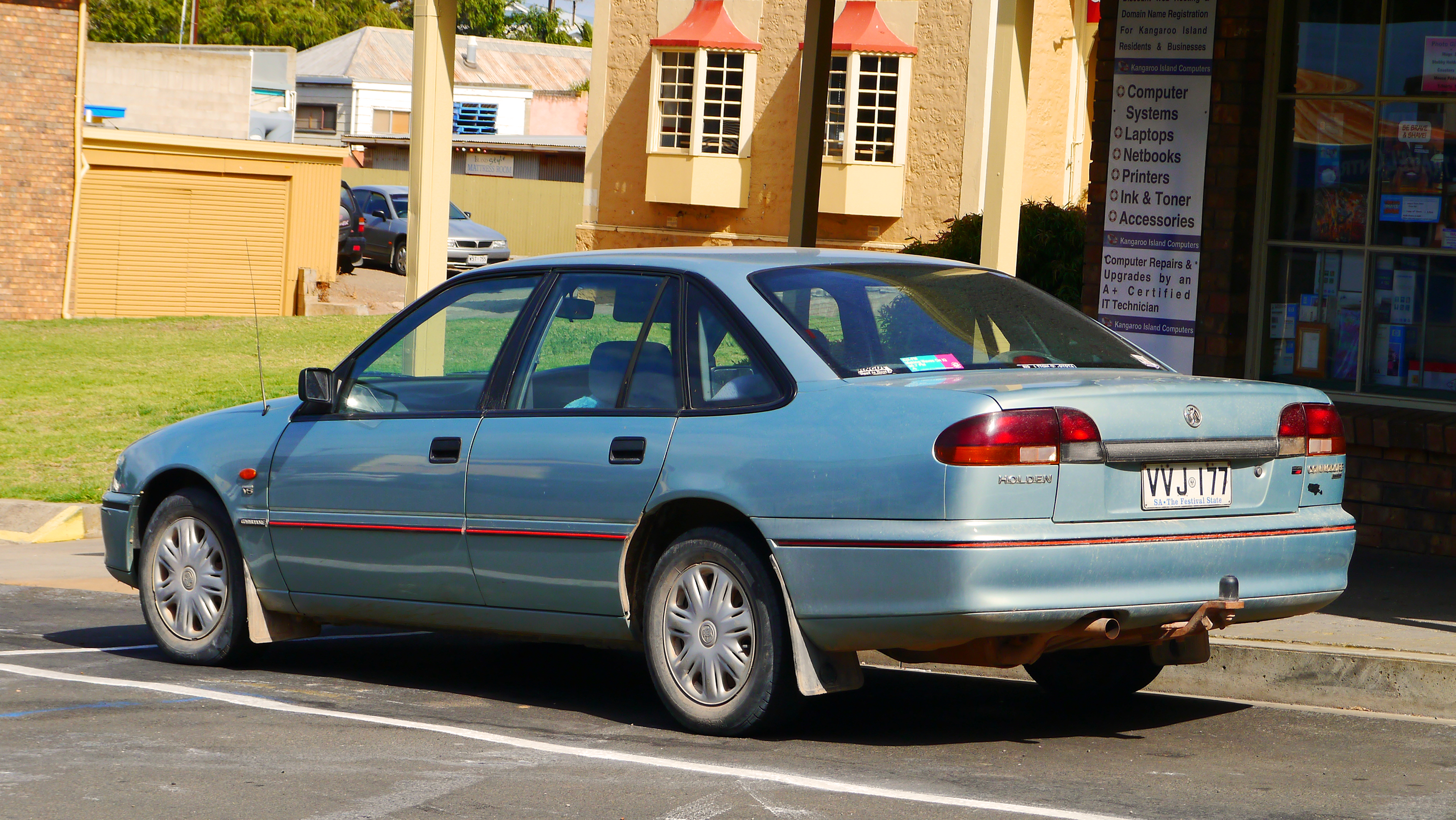
Holden Commodore Executive sedan (Series II)

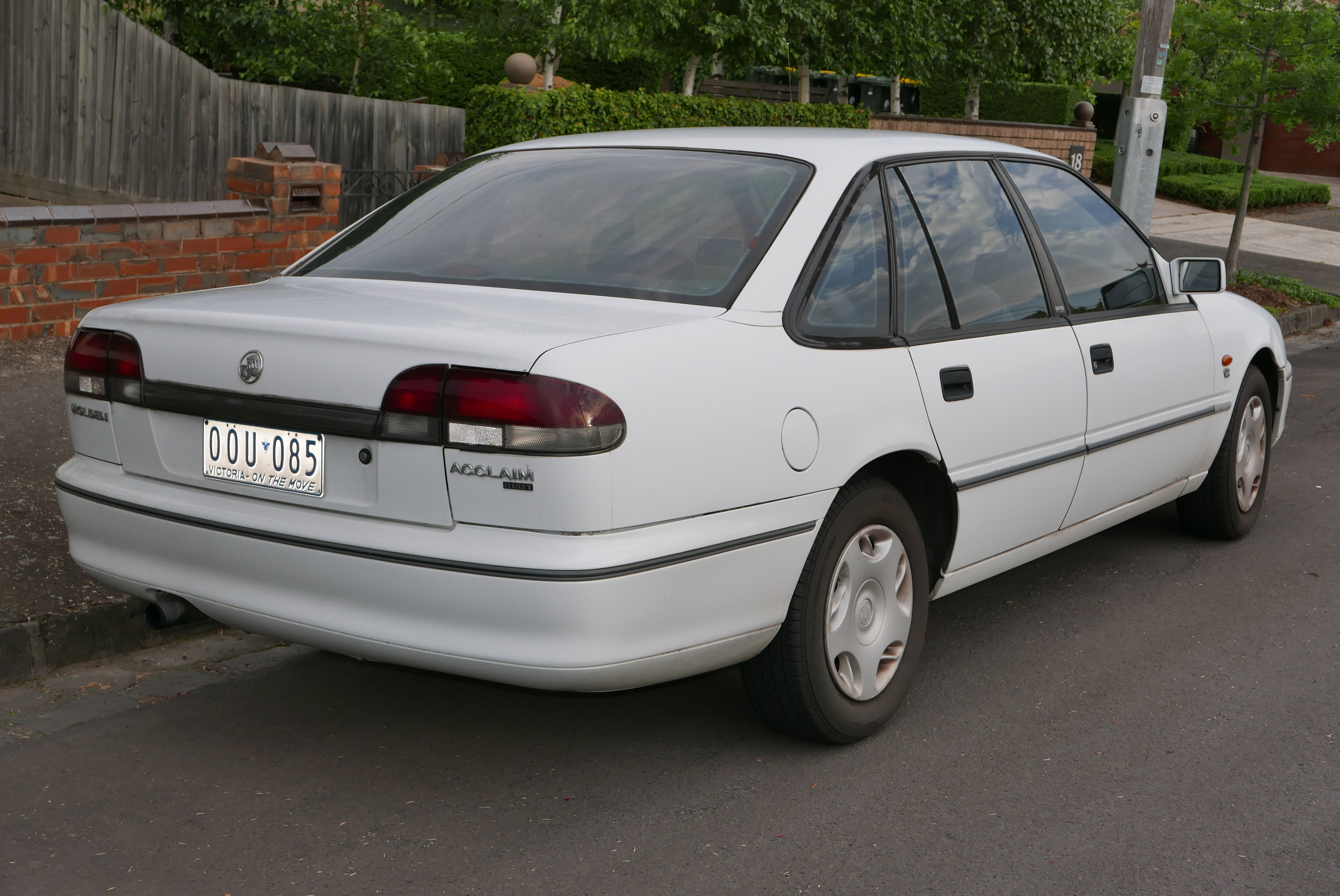
Holden Commodore Acclaim sedan (Series II)

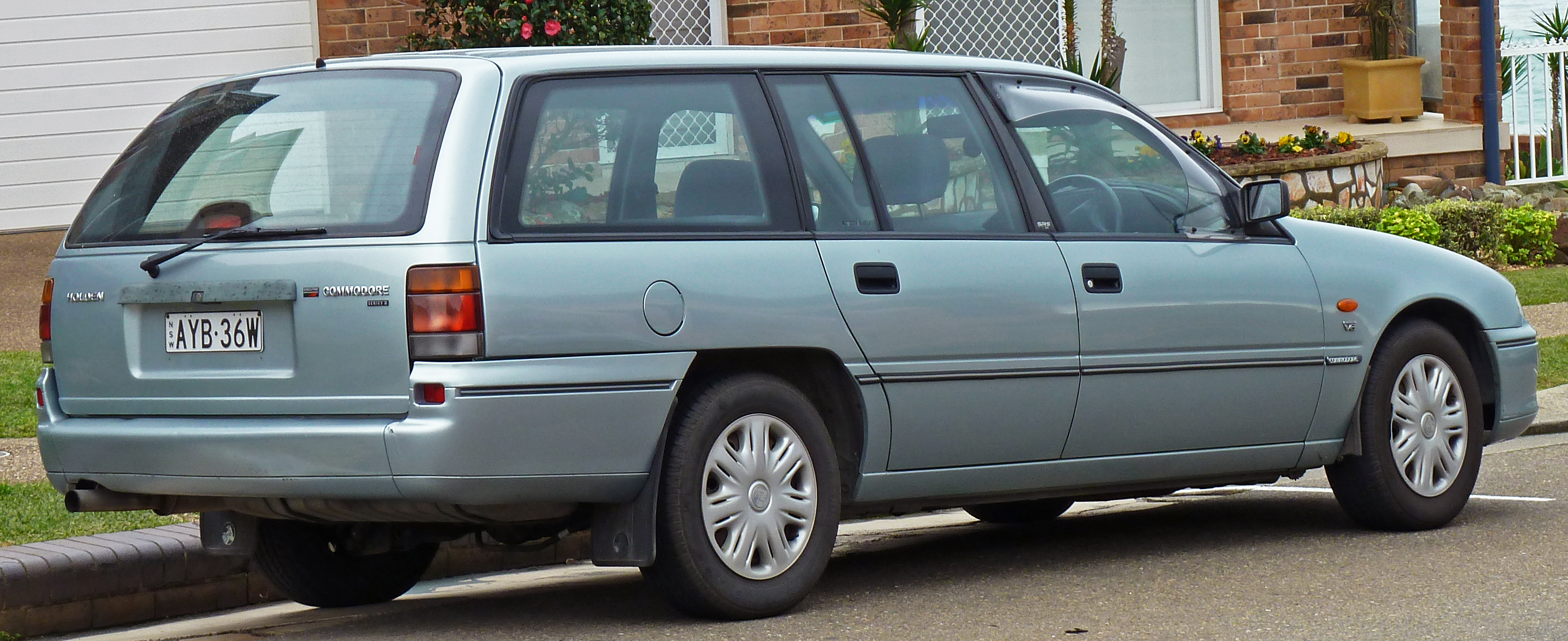
Holden Commodore Executive wagon (Series II)

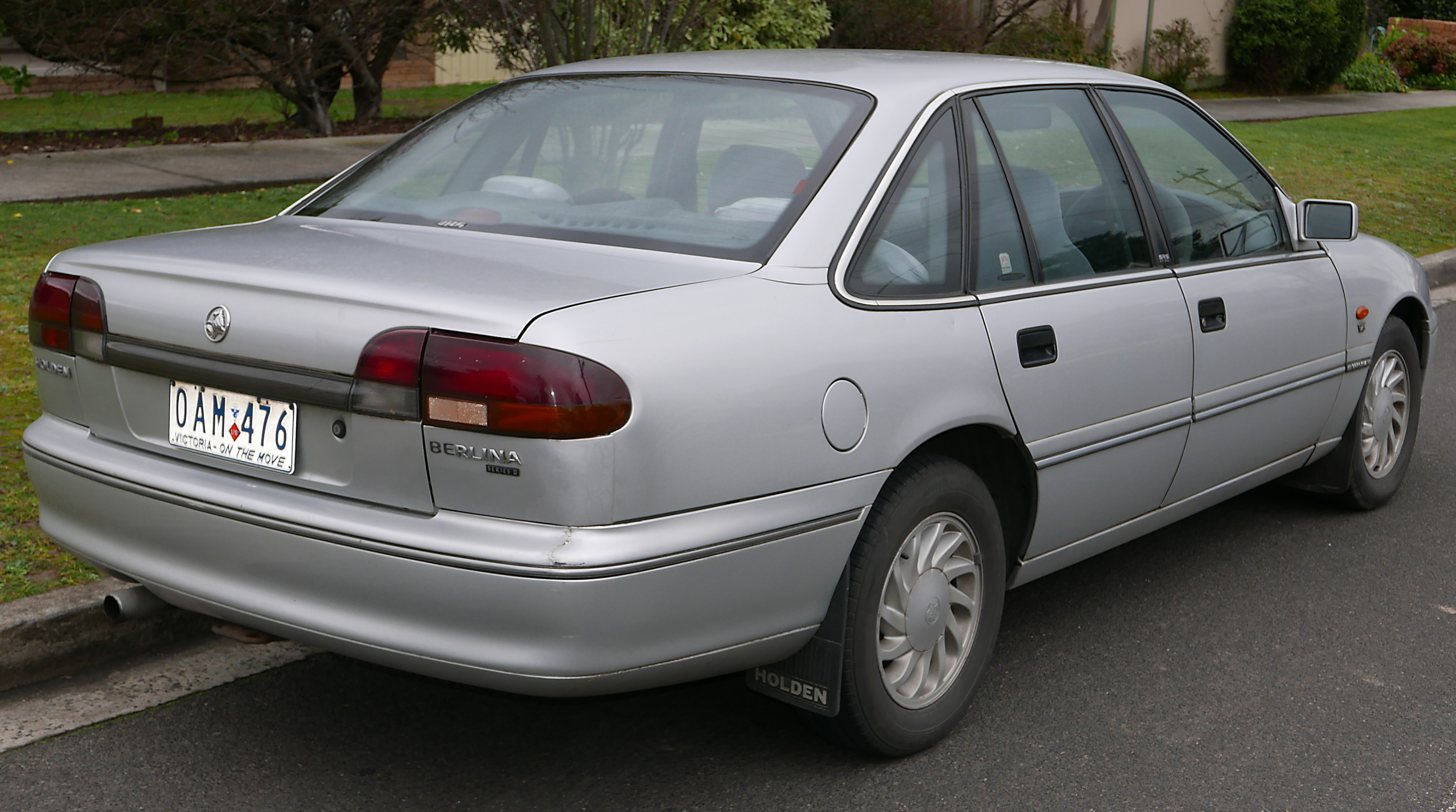
Holden Berlina sedan (Series II)

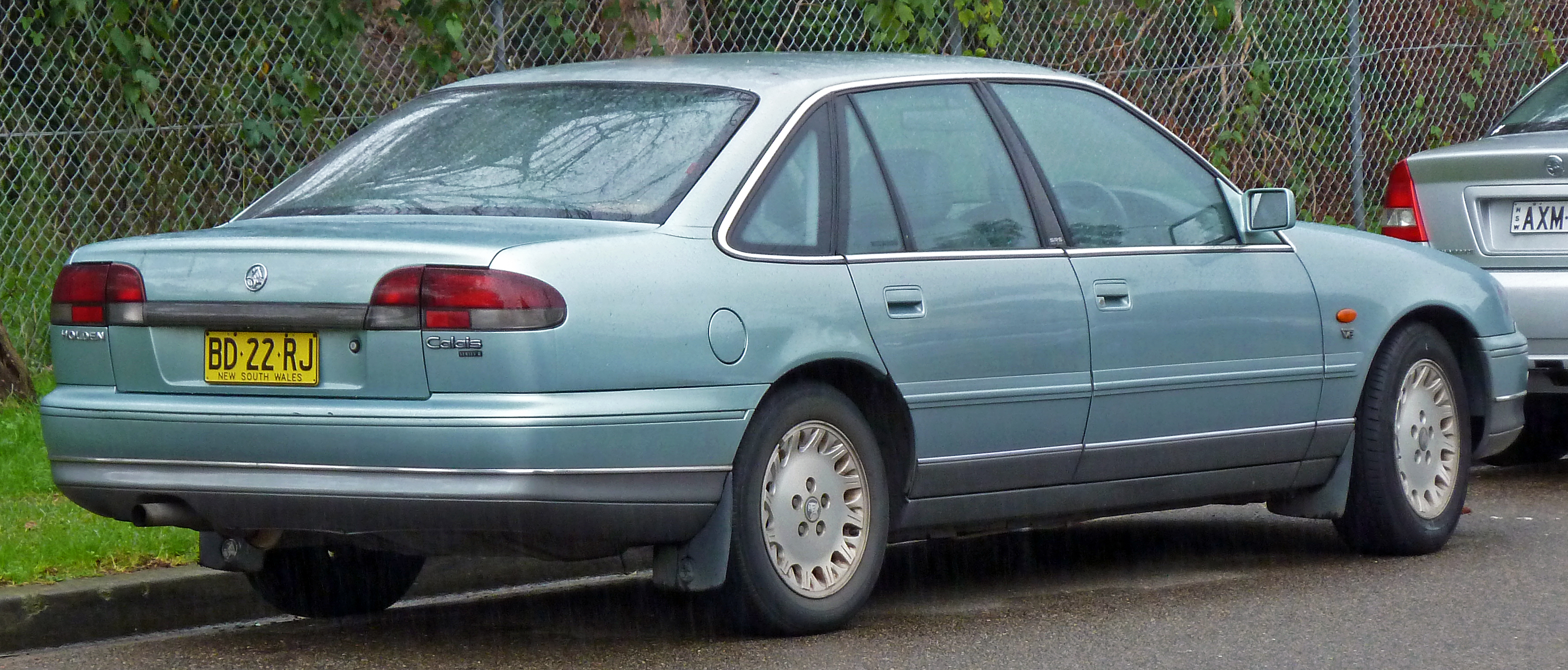
Holden Calais (Series II)

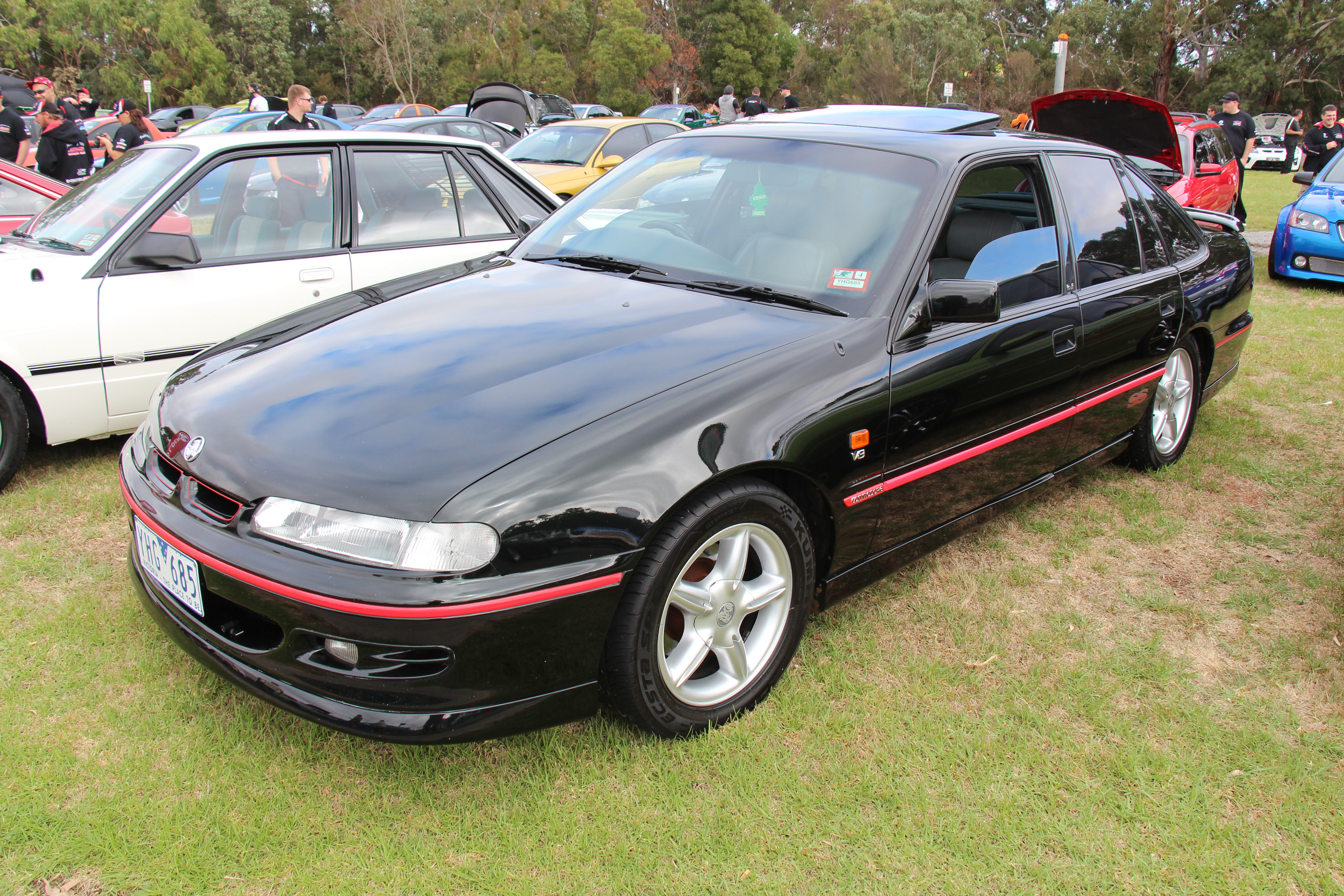
Holden Commodore SS (Series I)

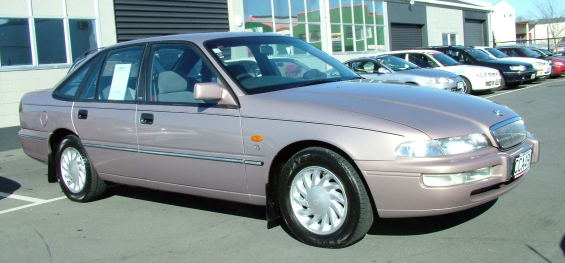
Holden Commodore Royale (New Zealand; Series II)
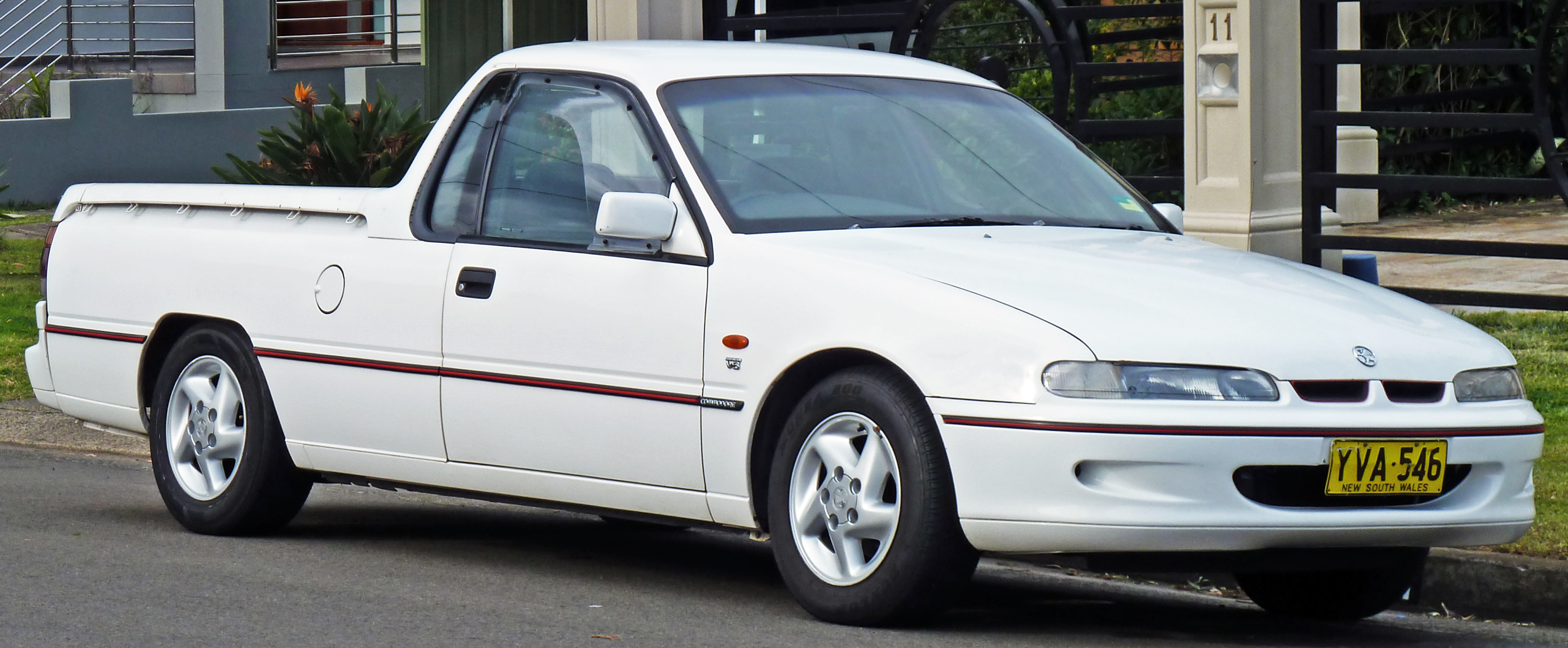
Holden Commodore S utility (Series II)

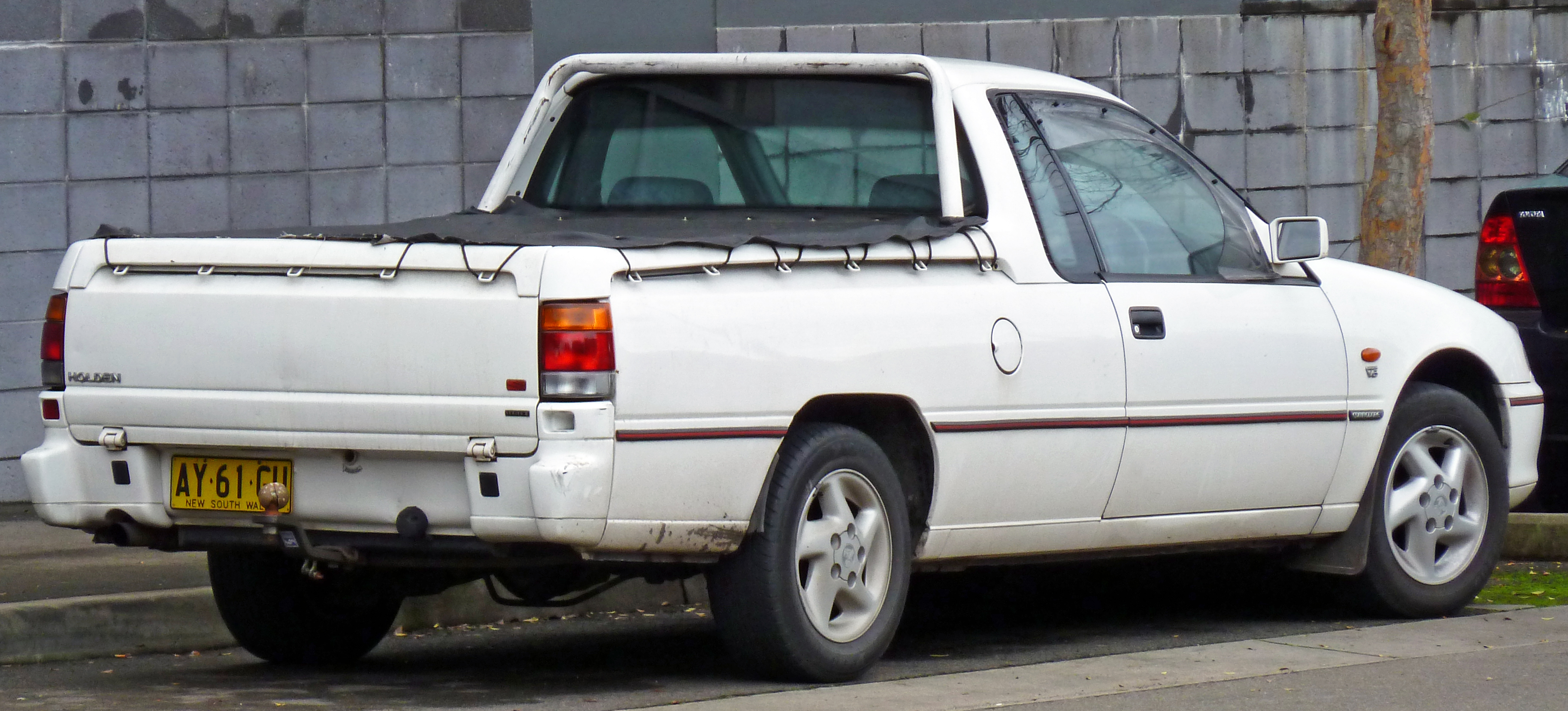
Holden Commodore S utility (Series II)

== HSV range ==
Holden's performance vehicle partner Holden Special Vehicles produced the following range of Holden VS based models, which were each marketed under the HSV brand.

=== Clubsport ===
The VS Clubsport was very similar to the VR Clubsport and still used the 5.0-litre V8 from the VR Clubsport.

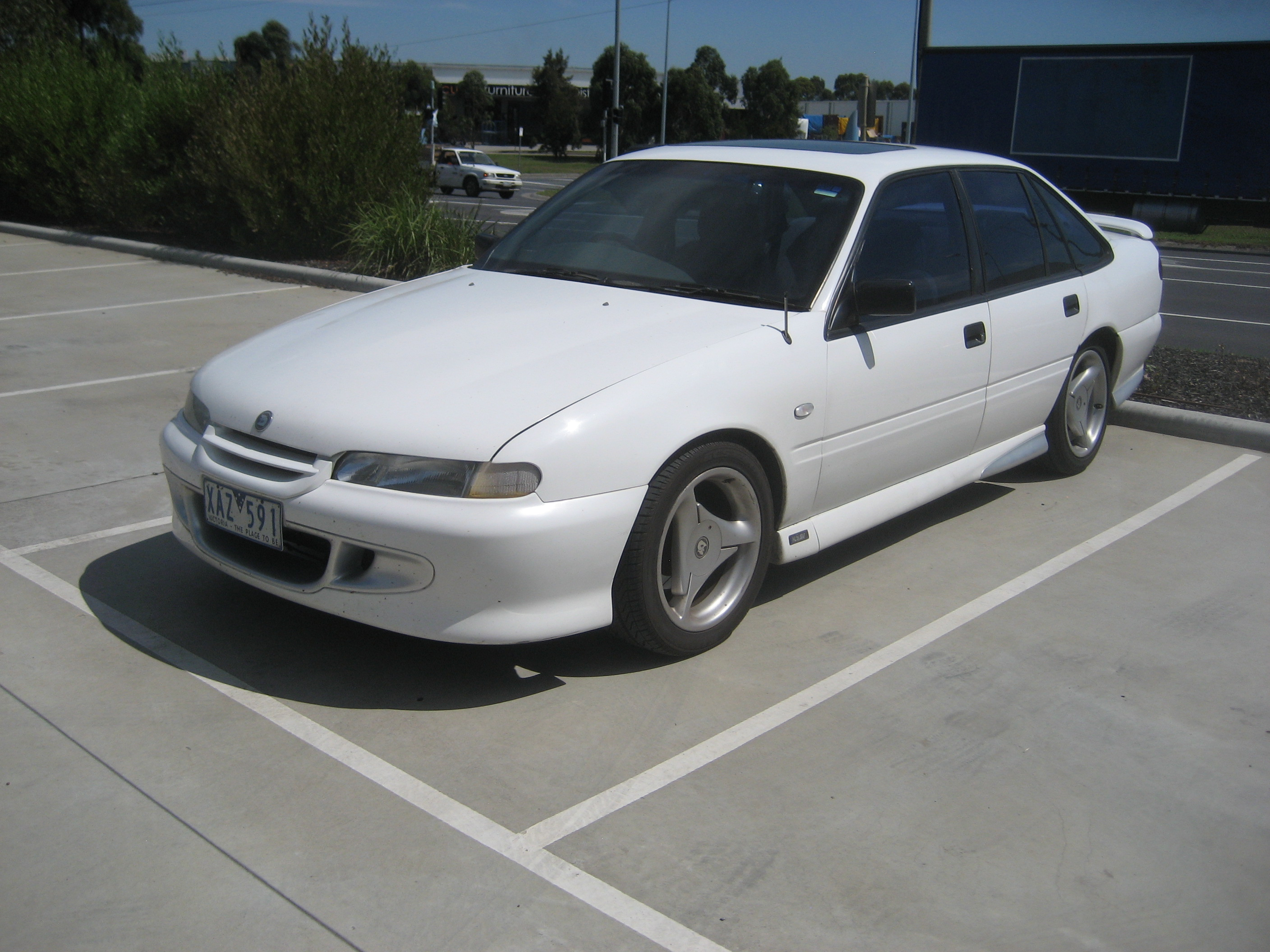
HSV Clubsport

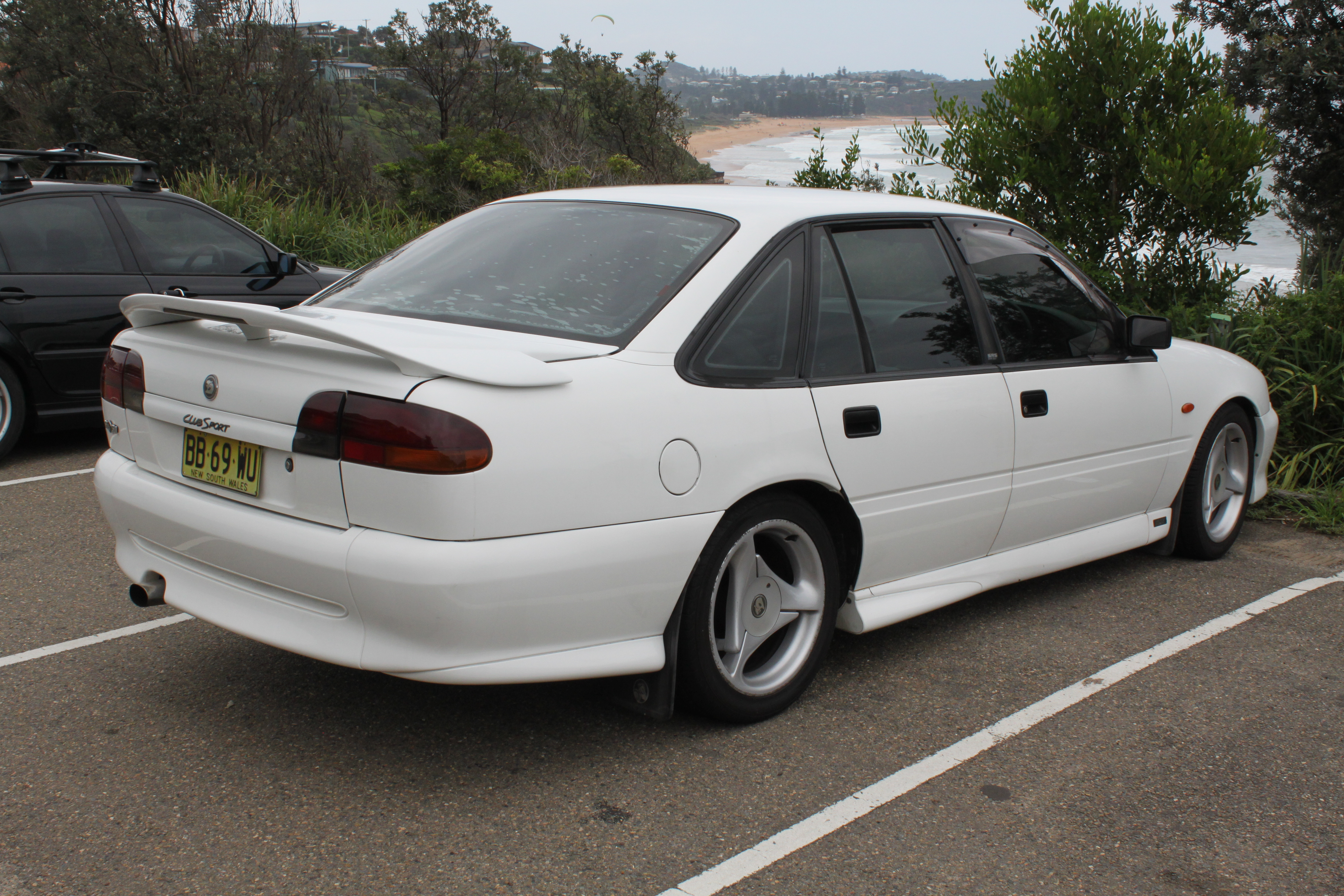
HSV Clubsport

=== Manta ===
The Manta was introduced in April 1995 in sedan and wagon models.

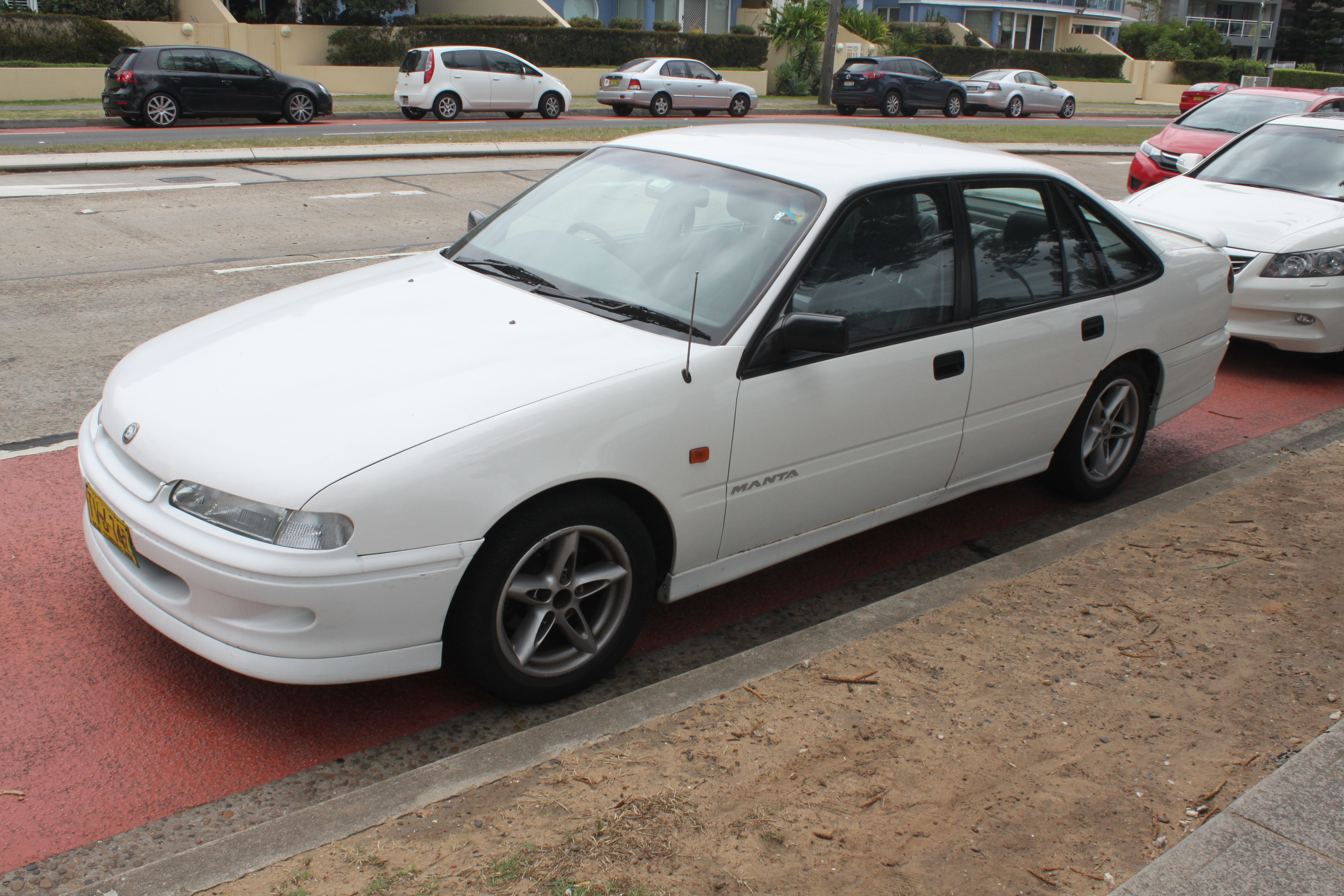
HSV Manta sedan

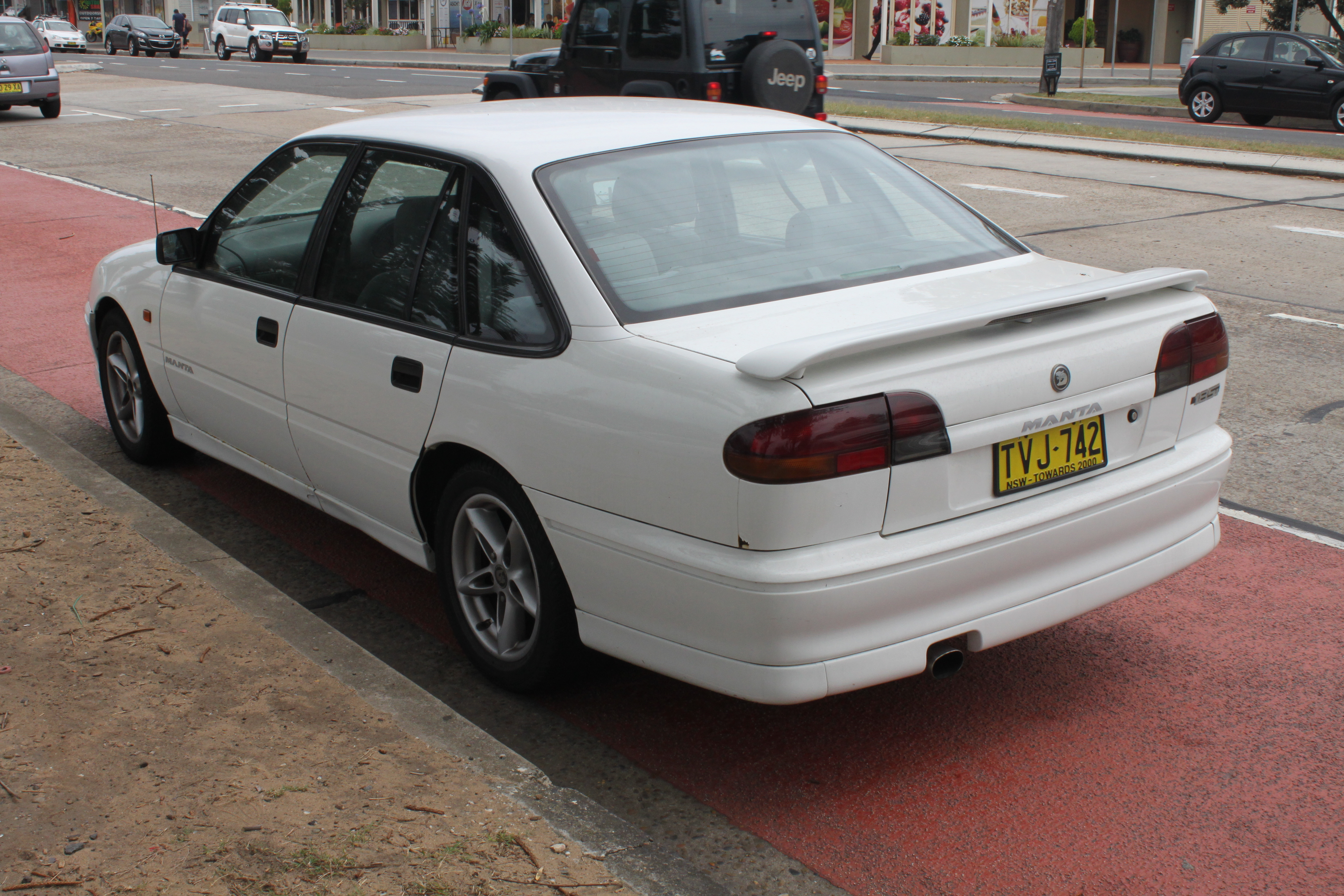
HSV Manta sedan

=== GTS and GTS-R ===
The GTS sedan was the flagship model until the limited edition GTS-R was launched. The latter was exclusively painted in XU-3 Yellah with matching seat colour inserts, and it featured a big race-style rear carbon-fibre wing. In total, only 75 were built for Australia and 10 for New Zealand, all using the 215i 5.7-litre HSV V8 engine, with a more powerful "blueprint" option also available.

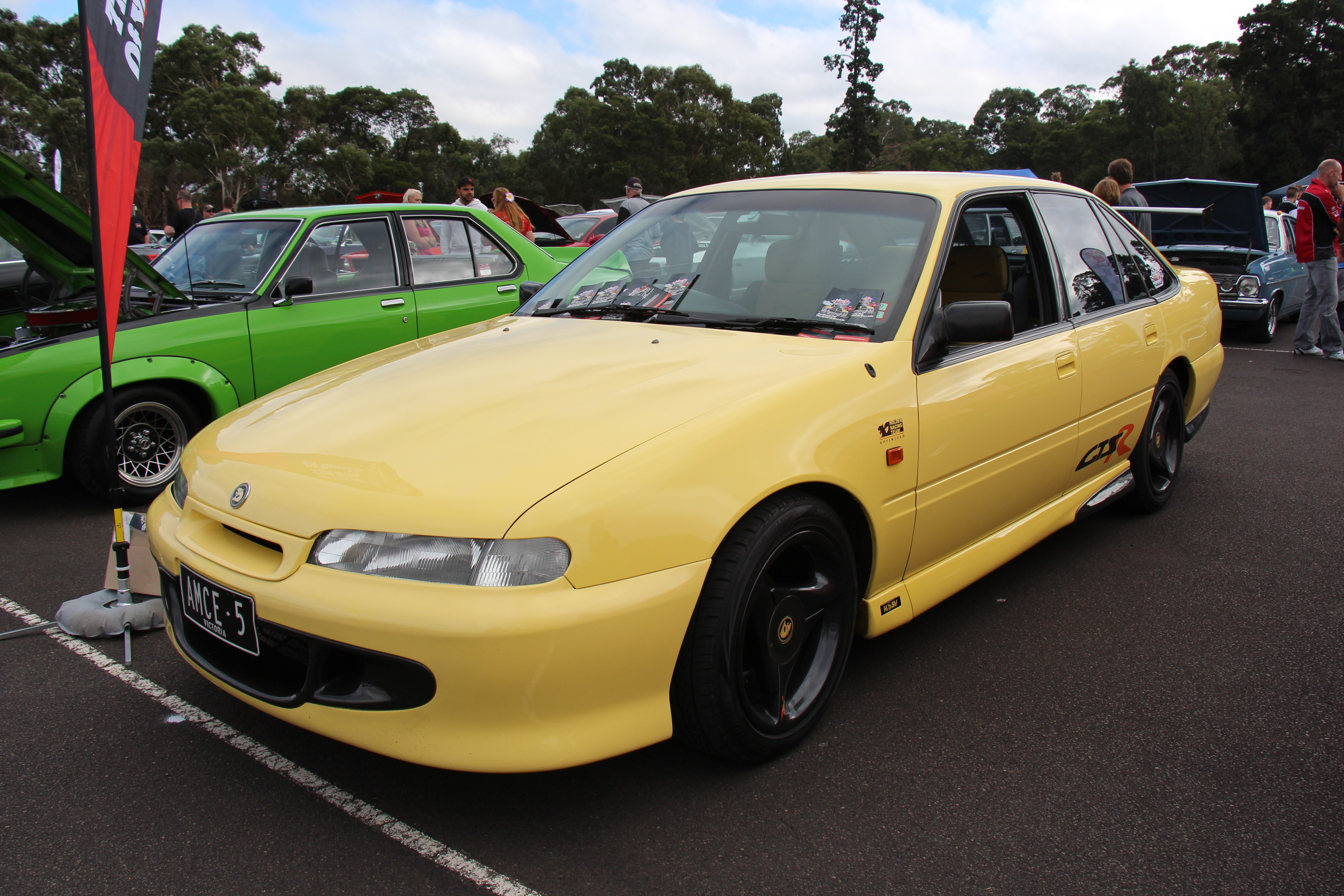
HSV GTS-R

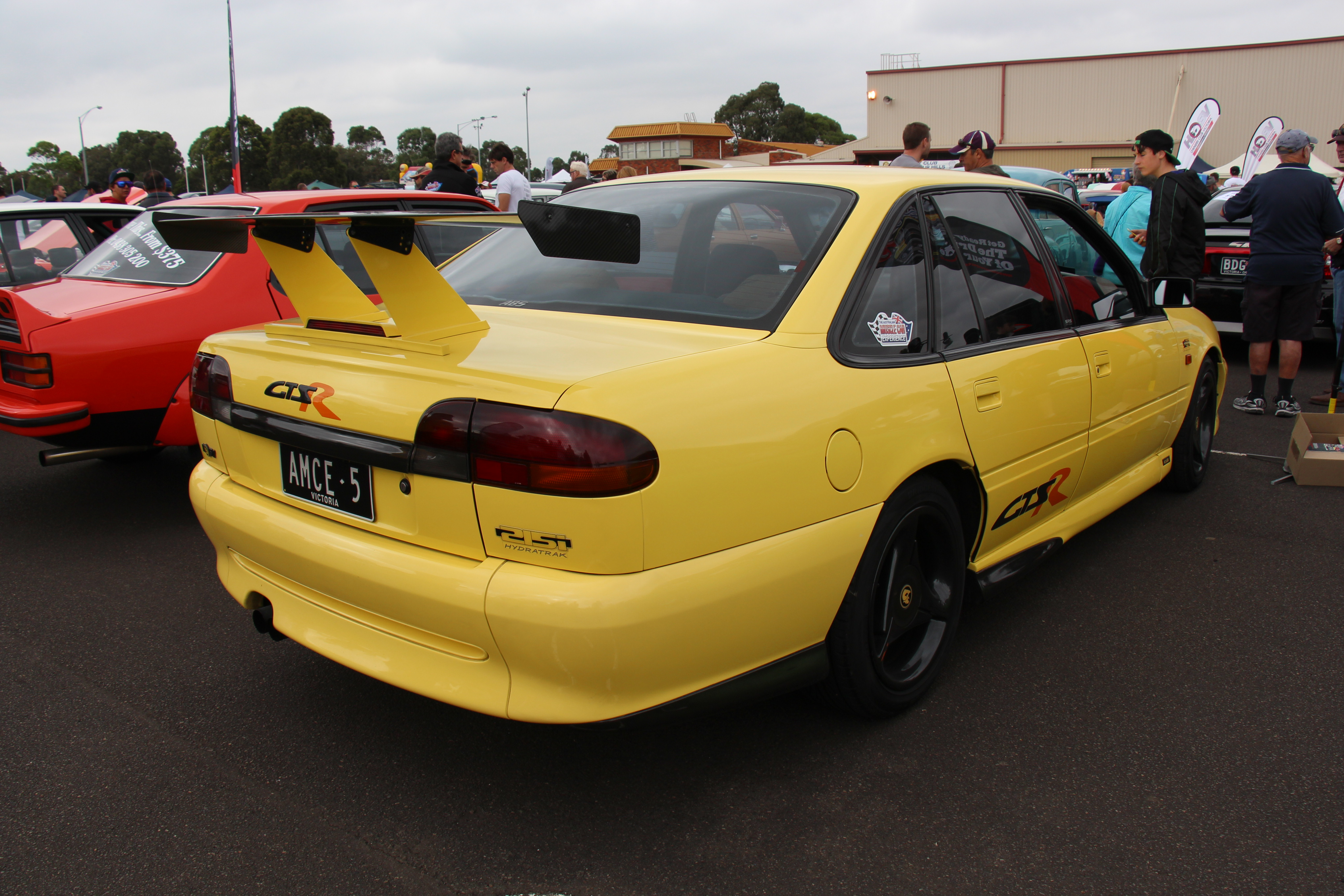
HSV GTS-R

=== Maloo ===
The facelifted VS series Maloo utility was released in April 1995. 173 examples were produced. It featured a 5.0-litre V8 engine still producing 185 kW (248 hp).

The Series II version was introduced in June 1996 and carried through in its original form to August 1997, during which time 280 examples were produced. With HSV's introduction of the VT sedan range in September 1997, continued production of the VS Maloo thereafter was curiously referred to as VS II at VT Maloo, whereby a further 388 examples were produced through to December 1998. These later models included a special run of ten HSV 10th Anniversary Edition Maloo utes featuring an exclusive Anniversary Bronze paint colour.

The next HSV update of the VS Maloo followed Holden's release of a VS Series III ute that, for the first time, included a V8 SS version. In 1999, HSV introduced an improved VS III Maloo with a wiring upgrade to support the revised 195 kW (261 hp) V8 that had been introduced two years earlier with the original VT series HSV sedans. The VS III Maloo's legacy is to be the last HSV vehicle to be fitted with the 'original' Holden V8 engine.

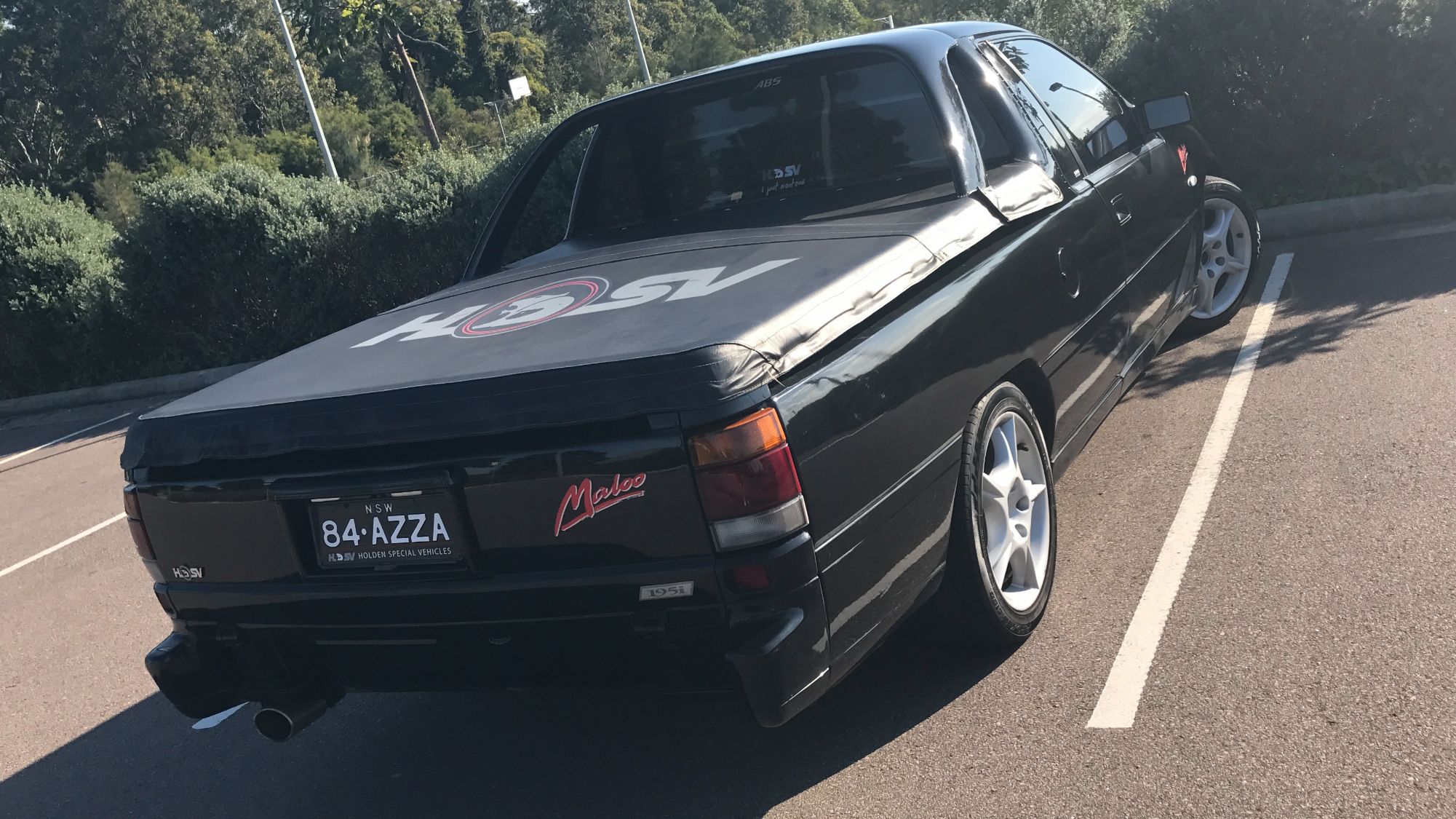
VS Maloo Series 3

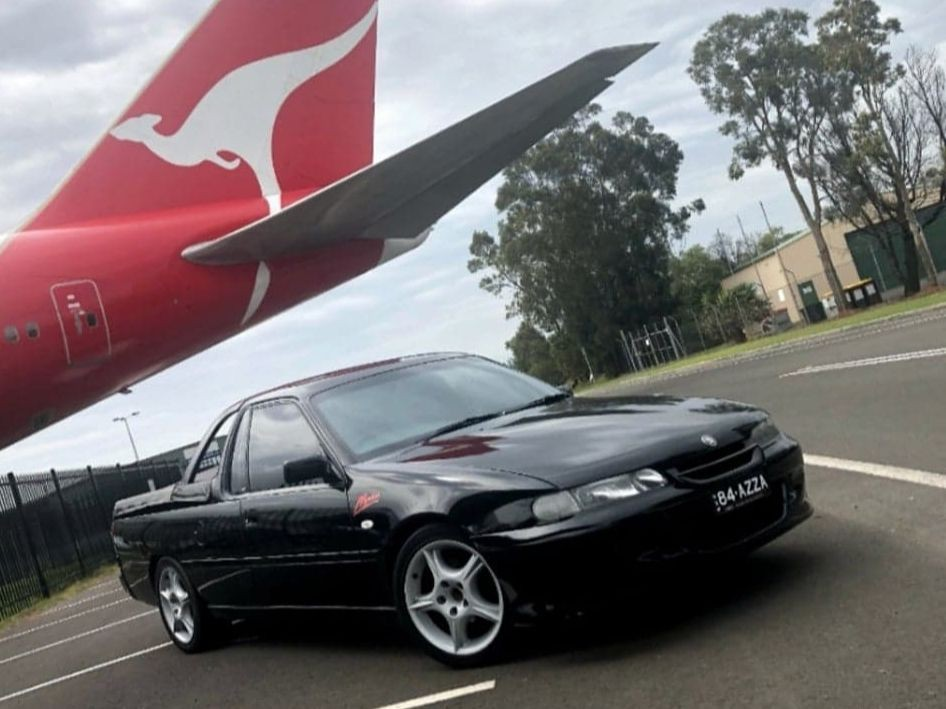
VS Maloo Series 3

=== Senator ===
In 1995 the VS Senator was introduced based on the VS Commodore. This model saw slight revisions to the body styling, trim and new alloy wheels. The VS Series II saw the fitment of HSV's ISS (Integrated Security System) as standard as well as new steering-wheel mounted stereo controls. There remained a choice of two models: the 185i and the 215i. The 185i had the 5.0-litre (4987 cc) V8 engine which pushed out 185 kW (248 hp) at 4800 rpm. The 215i had the 5.7-litre (5737 cc) V8 engine which delivered 215 kW (288 hp) at 4800 rpm. The total number that were built by December 1995 was 416, down 439 units over the VR.

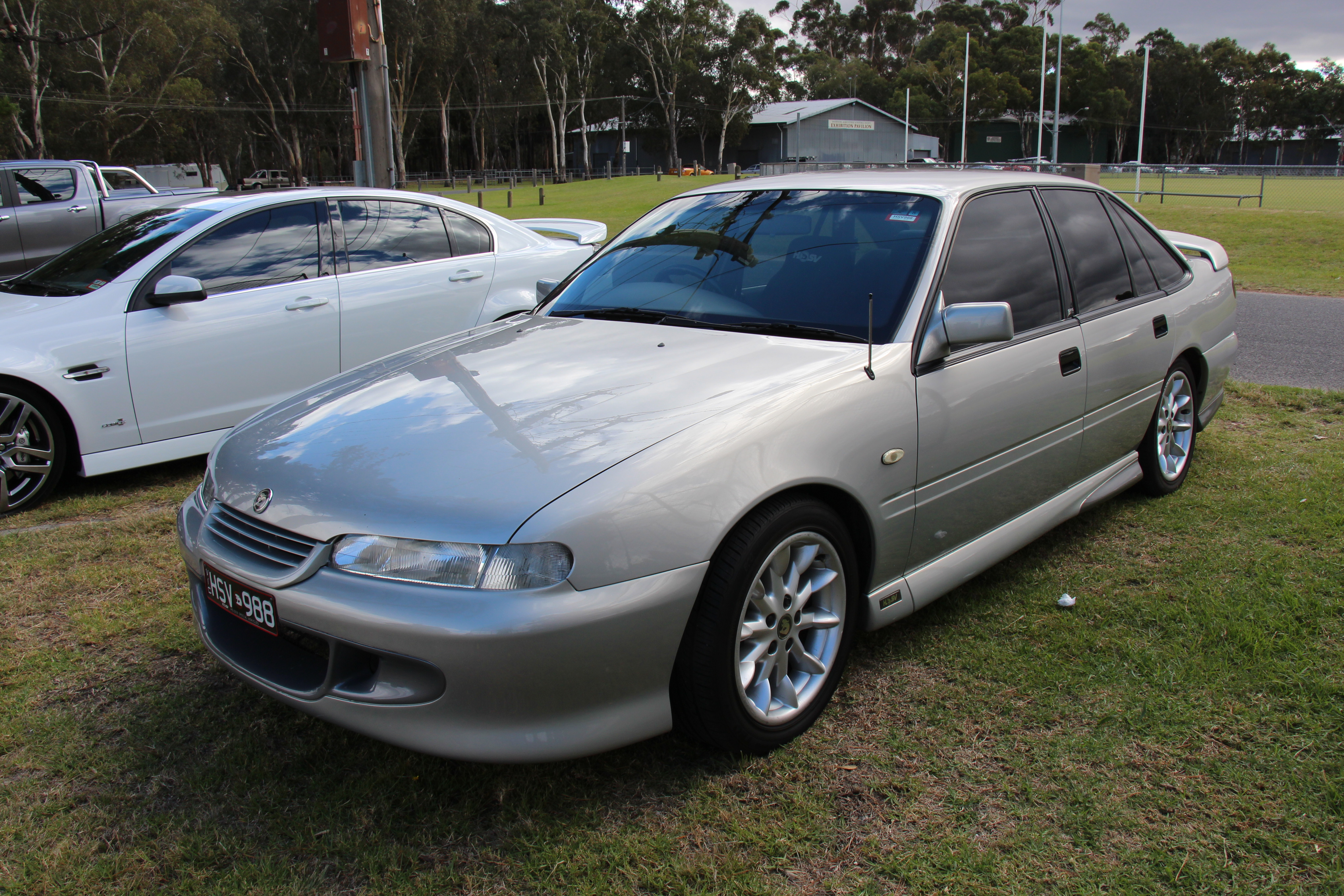
HSV Senator

== Toyota Lexcen (T4 and T5) ==
The United Australian Automobile Industries (UAAI) joint venture agreement with Toyota Australia first starting with the VN Commodore continued up to the VS. The VS Toyota Lexcen equivalent was known as the T4 series, updated in 1996 to T5 following Commodore’s Series II update. The Lexcen featured subtle styling differences, particularly, the front panels. The Lexcen was discontinued in August 1997 and Toyota would not enter the Australian market with another large family car under their own brand. Instead, the Lexus GS S160 was offered which had similar dimensions to the Lexcen and was available with both inline 6 and V8 engines.

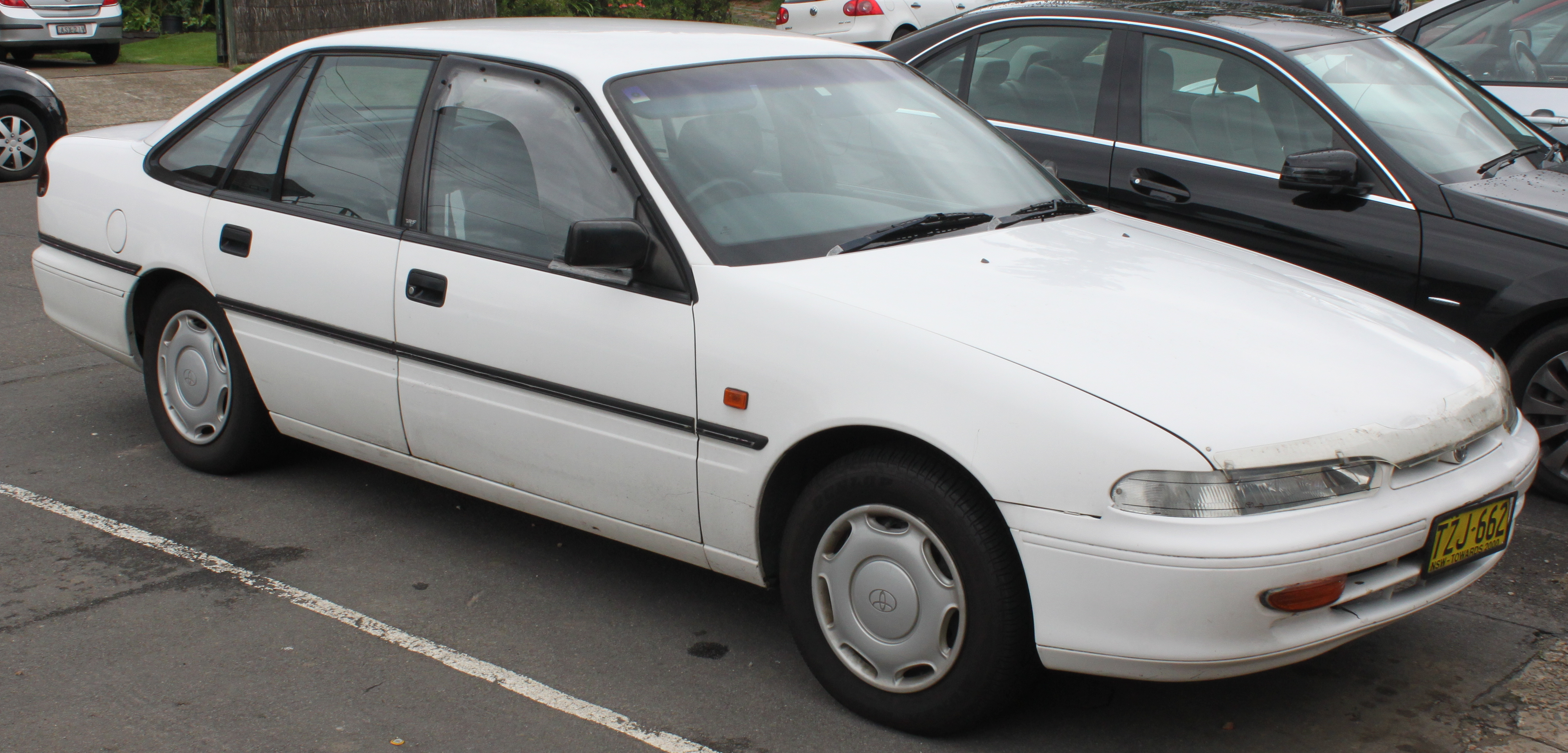
Toyota Lexcen (T4) CSi sedan

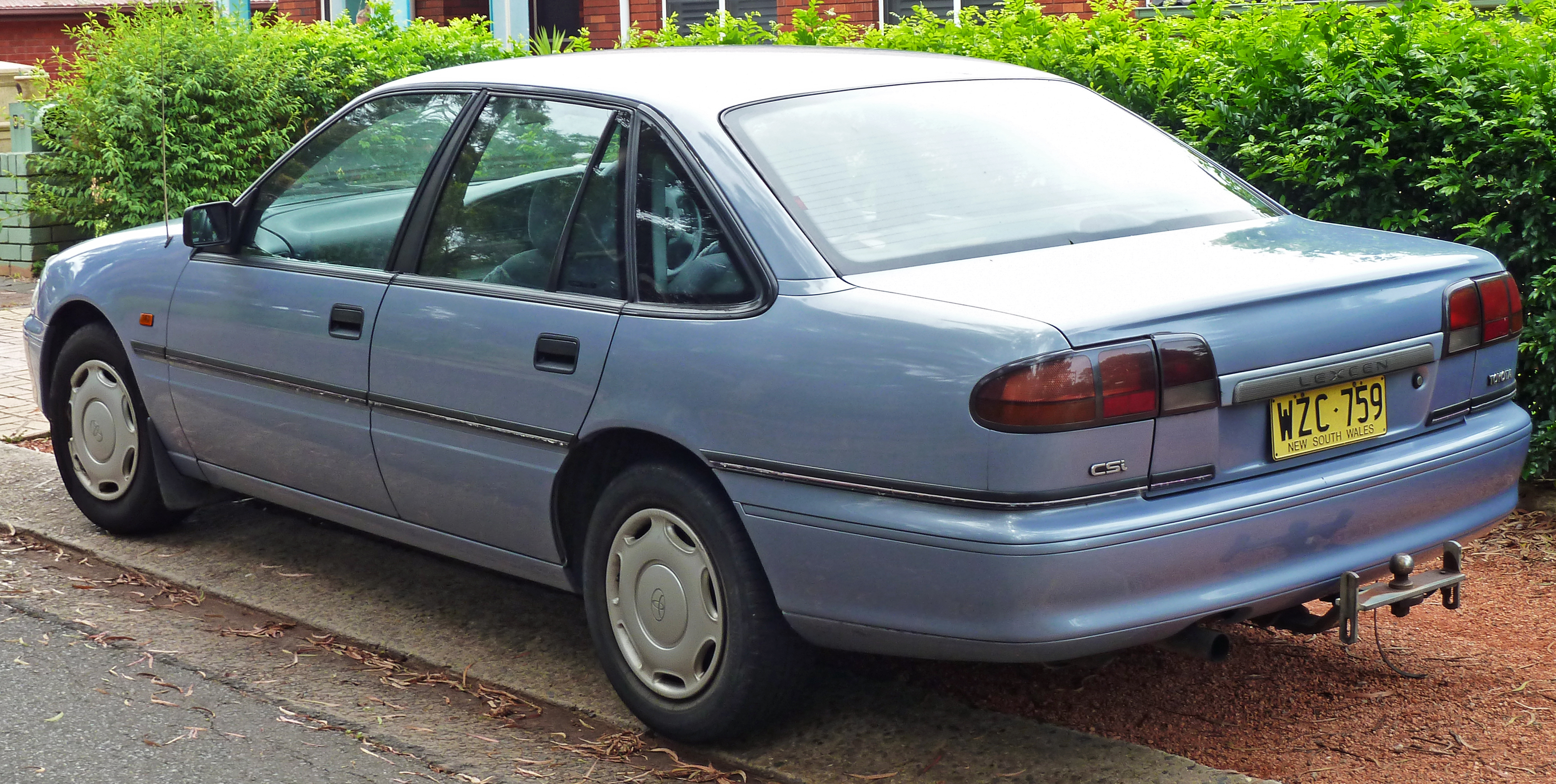
Toyota Lexcen (T4) CSi sedan

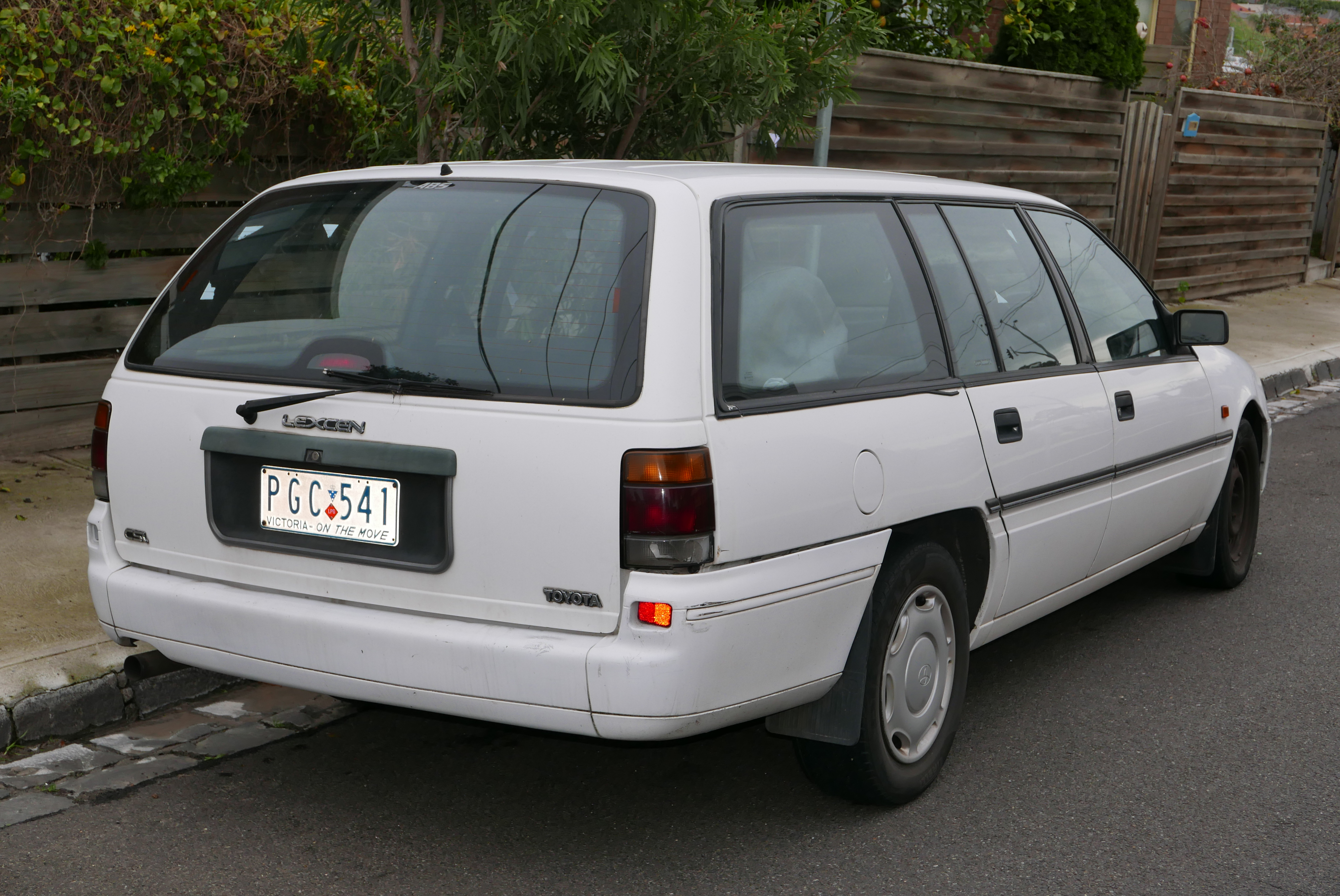
Toyota Lexcen (T4) CSi wagon

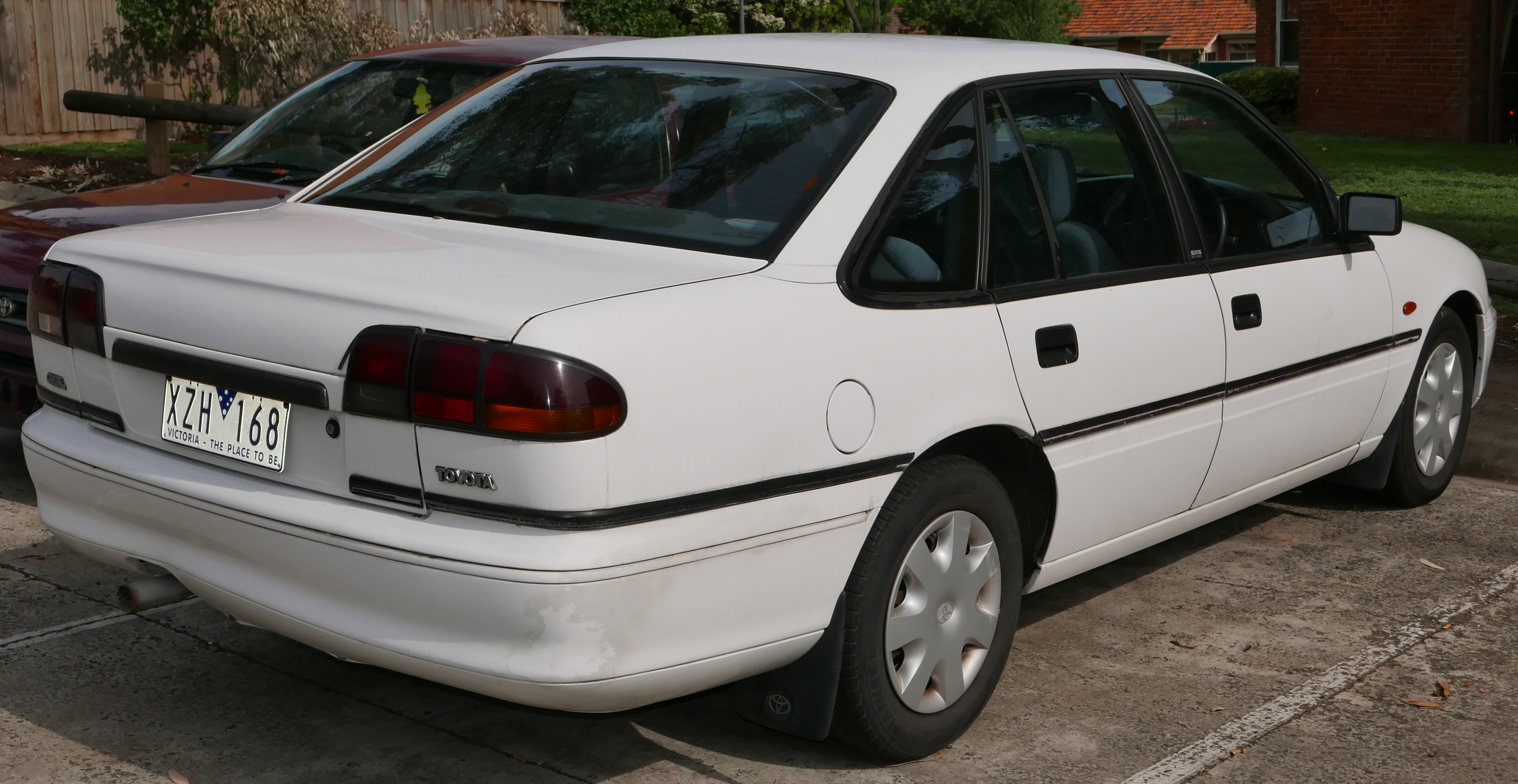
Toyota Lexcen (T5) CSi sedan
