= 1997 Tickford 500 =

Track map of the Sandown Raceway

The 1997 Tickford 500 was an endurance motor race for V8 Supercars. It was held on 14 September 1997 at the Sandown Raceway and was the 32nd running of the Sandown 500.

The race was won by Craig Lowndes and Greg Murphy, driving a Holden VS Commodore for the Holden Racing Team.

== Qualifying ==
The fastest lap in qualifying was set by Mark Skaife at 1:11.3142.

== Top 10 Shootout ==
The Top 10 Shootout, which was contested by the fastest ten cars from Qualifying, determined the order of the first ten grid positions for the race.

Pos	No	Entrant	Driver	Car
Pole	05	Holden Racing Team	(Australia) Mark Skaife	Holden VS Commodore
2	10	Mitre 10 Racing	(Australia) Mark Larkham	Ford EL Falcon
3	1	Ford Credit Racing	(Australia) Glenn Seton	Ford EL Falcon
4	9	Alan Jones Racing	(Australia) Alan Jones	Ford EL Falcon
5	97	Holden Racing Team	(Australia) Jason Bargwanna	Holden VS Commodore
6	15	Holden Racing Team	(New Zealand) Greg Murphy	Holden VS Commodore
7	46	Betta Electrical	(New Zealand) John Faulkner	Holden VS Commodore
8	7	Wayne Gardner Racing	(Australia) Wayne Gardner	Holden VS Commodore
9	17	Shell Helix Racing	(Australia) Dick Johnson	Ford EL Falcon
10	25	Castrol Longhurst	(Australia) Tony Longhurst	Ford EL Falcon

== Official results ==
Pos.	No.	Entrant	Drivers	Car	Laps
1	15	Holden Racing Team	(Australia) Craig Lowndes (New Zealand) Greg Murphy	Holden VS Commodore	157
2	11	Castrol Perkins Racing	(Australia) Larry Perkins (Australia) Russell Ingall	Holden VS Commodore	157
3	9	Alan Jones Racing	(Australia) Alan Jones (Australia) Jason Bright	Ford EL Falcon	157
4	46	John Faulkner Racing	(New Zealand) John Faulkner (United Kingdom) Win Percy	Holden VS Commodore	156
5	34	Garry Rogers Motorsport	(New Zealand) Steven Richards (New Zealand) Jim Richards	Holden VS Commodore	155
6	7	Wayne Gardner Racing	(Australia) Wayne Gardner (Australia) Neil Crompton	Holden VS Commodore	155
7	18	Dick Johnson Racing	(Australia) Steven Johnson (New Zealand) Craig Baird	Ford EL Falcon	154
8	45	Gibson Motorsport	(Australia) Darren Hossack (Australia) Steven Ellery	Holden VR Commodore	154
9	97	Holden Young Lions	(Australia) Jason Bargwanna (Australia) Mark Noske	Holden VS Commodore	153
10	25	Longhurst Racing	(Australia) Tony Longhurst (Australia) Charlie O'Brien	Ford EL Falcon	151
11	1	Glenn Seton Racing	(Australia) Glenn Seton (Australia) David Parsons	Ford EL Falcon	150
12	05	Holden Racing Team	(Australia) Peter Brock (Australia) Mark Skaife	Holden VS Commodore	150
13	12	Robert Smith Racing	(Australia) Bruce Williams (Australia) Paul Gover	Holden VS Commodore	148
14	26	M3 Motorsport	(Australia) Peter Doulman (Australia) John Cotter	Holden VP Commodore	148
15	24	Romano Racing	(Australia) Paul Romano (Australia) Allan Grice	Holden VS Commodore	144
16	14	Malcolm Stenniken	(Australia) Malcolm Stenniken (New Zealand) Norris Miles	Holden VR Commodore	144
17	16	Castrol Cougars	(Australia) Melinda Price (Australia) Kerryn Brewer	Holden VS Commodore	139
18	49	Alcair Airconditioning	(Australia) Greg Crick (Australia) Peter Fitzgerald (Australia) Terry Finnigan	Holden VR Commodore	132
DNF	47	Bottlemagic	(Australia) John Trimbole (Australia) Tomas Mezera	Holden VS Commodore	128
DNF	28	Playscape Racing	(Australia) Kevin Waldock (Australia) John Smith	Ford EF Falcon	112
DNF	17	Dick Johnson Racing	(Australia) Dick Johnson (Australia) John Bowe	Ford EL Falcon	108
DNF	79	Cadillac Productions	(Australia) Mike Conway (Australia) Gavin Monaghan	Ford EB2 Falcon	95
DNF	3	Lansvale Racing Team	(Australia) Steve Reed (Australia) Trevor Ashby	Holden VS Commodore	47
DNF	10	Larkham Motor Sport	(Australia) Mark Larkham (Australia) Andrew Miedecke	Ford EL Falcon	33

The race was started in the rain under the control of the safety car. The weather conditions resulted in a slower than expected average speed and the race did not run to its full 161 lap distance, being halted on lap 157 after 3 hours 45 minutes and 22.3508 seconds.

== Statistics ==
- Pole position: Mark Skaife
- Fastest race lap: Mark Skaife – 1:17.4932 on lap 101
- Race time of winning car: 3h 45:22.3508

Preceded by 1996 Tickford 500	Sandown 500; 1997	Succeeded by 1998 Tickford 500
