= 1994 Sandown 500 =

Track map of the Sandown Raceway

The 1994 Sandown 500 was an endurance motor race for Group 3A Touring Cars and selected production cars held at the Sandown circuit in Victoria, Australia on 4 September 1994. The event was staged over 161 laps of the 3.10 km circuit, a total distance of 499 km. It was the 29th race in a sequence of annual endurance races held at Sandown.

Dick Johnson and John Bowe won the race in their Dick Johnson Racing Ford EB Falcon. Second was the Gibson Motorsport Holden VP Commodore of Mark Skaife and Jim Richards, while third was the Perkins Engineering Commodore of Larry Perkins and Gregg Hansford. After first racing in the "Sandown 500" in 1977 when the race was known as the Hang Ten 400, Dick Johnson scored his first win in the classic.

The race was notable as it marked the debut race of future three-time Supercars champion Craig Lowndes.

== Results ==
Pos.	Class	No.	Entrant	Drivers	Car	Laps
1	V8	17	Shell FAI Racing	(Australia) Dick Johnson (Australia) John Bowe	Ford EB Falcon	161
2	V8	2	Winfield Racing	(Australia) Mark Skaife (New Zealand) Jim Richards	Holden VP Commodore	161
3	V8	11	Castrol Perkins Racing Team	(Australia) Larry Perkins (Australia) Gregg Hansford	Holden VP Commodore	161
4	V8	25	Benson & Hedges Racing	(Australia) Tony Longhurst (Australia) Charlie O'Brien	Holden VP Commodore	161
5	V8	015	Holden Racing Team	(Australia) Brad Jones (Australia) Craig Lowndes	Holden VP Commodore	161
6	V8	05	Holden Racing Team	(Australia) Tomas Mezera (Australia) Peter Brock	Holden VP Commodore	161
7	V8	7	Coca-Cola Racing	(United Kingdom) Win Percy (Australia) Russell Ingall	Holden VP Commodore	159
8	V8	18	Shell FAI Racing	(Australia) Allan Grice (Australia) Steven Johnson	Ford EB Falcon	159
9	V8	1	Peter Jackson Racing	(Australia) Glenn Seton (New Zealand) Paul Radisich	Ford EB Falcon	158
10	V8	47	Daily Planet Racing	(Australia) John Trimbole (Australia) Steve Harrington	Holden VP Commodore	157
11	V8	12	Ampol Max 3 Racing	(Australia) Bob Jones (Australia) Troy Dunstan	Holden VP Commodore	156
12	V8	39	Anderson Consulting / Protech	(Australia) Chris Smerdon (Australia) Cameron McConville	Holden VP Commodore	155
13	V8	24	Pinnacle Motorsport	(Australia) Greg Crick (Australia) Tony Scott	Holden VP Commodore	154
14	V8	26	Don Watson Transport	(Australia) Don Watson (Australia) Ian Love	Holden VP Commodore	154
15	Prod.	9	Neville Crichton	(New Zealand) Neville Crichton (Australia) Mark Brame	BMW M3	141
16	Prod.	70	BP Mazda Motorsport	(Australia) Garry Waldon (Australia) Colin Bond	Mazda RX-7	140
17	Prod.	34	Garry Rogers Motorsport	(New Zealand) Steven Richards (Australia) Garry Rogers	Porsche 968CS	140
18	V8	28	Playscape Racing	(Australia) Kevin Waldock (Australia) Michael Preston	Ford EB Falcon	133
19	Prod.	8	Volvo Cars Australia Pty Ltd	(Netherlands) Jan Lammers (Australia) Kent Youlden	Volvo 850 T-5	132
20	Prod.	19	Murray Carter	(Australia) Murray Carter (Australia) Terri Sawyer	Nissan Pulsar SSS	129
21	Prod.	61	Falken Tyres	(Australia) Keith Carling (Australia) Kevin Burton	Mazda RX-7	126
22	Prod.	41	Danny Bogut	(Australia) Danny Bogut (Australia) Ian Sawtell	Mazda 626	123
DNF	V8	30	Peter Jackson Racing	(Australia) Alan Jones (Australia) David Parsons	Ford EB Falcon	147
DNF	V8	44	Group Motorsport	(Australia) George Ayoub (Australia) Mike Conway	Holden VL Commodore SS Group A SV	130
NC	Prod.	33	David Sala	(Australia) David Sala (Australia) Steve Swaine	Holden VP Commodore SS	113
NC	V8	23	Diet-Coke Racing	(Australia) Paul Morris (Australia) Geoff Brabham	Holden VP Commodore	94
DNF	V8	16	Australian Boat Manufacturers	(Australia) Graham Blythman (Australia) Stephen Renshaw	Holden VP Commodore	56
DNF	V8	31	Malcolm Stenniken	(Australia) Brett Youlden (Australia) Malcolm Stenniken	Holden VL Commodore SS Group A SV	34
DNF	V8	4	Coca-Cola Racing	(Australia) Wayne Gardner (Australia) Neil Crompton	Holden VP Commodore	27

=== Notes ===
- Pole position: Peter Brock, 1m 22.8269s
- Race time of winning car: 3h 34m 14.4198s
- Fastest lap: Dick Johnson / John Bowe, 1m 14.0747s

== See also ==
1994 Australian Touring Car season

Preceded by 1993 Sandown 500	Sandown 500; 1994	Succeeded by 1995 Sandown 500
