= 1996 Tickford 500 =

Track map of the Sandown Raceway

The 1996 Tickford 500 was an endurance motor race for 5.0 Litre Touring Cars complying with CAMS Group 3A regulations. The event was held at the Sandown International Motor Raceway in Victoria, Australia on 8 September 1996. Race distance was 161 laps of the 3.1 km circuit, a total of 499 km. It was the 31st running of the Sandown touring car endurance race. 25,000 spectators attended the race.

The race was won by Craig Lowndes and Greg Murphy driving a Holden VR Commodore.

== Results ==
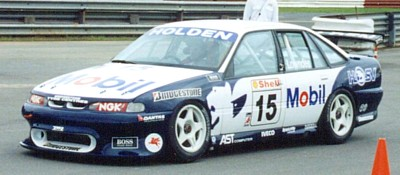
Craig Lowndes and Greg Murphy won the race driving a Holden VR Commodore for the Mobil Holden Racing Team. The picture above is of Lowndes in a Mobil Holden Racing Team Holden VR Commodore at a round of the 1996 Australian Touring Car Championship.

Pos.	Drivers	No.	Car	Entrant	Laps
1	(Australia) Craig Lowndes (New Zealand) Greg Murphy	1	Holden VR Commodore	Mobil Holden Racing Team	161
2	(Australia) Glenn Seton (Australia) David Parsons	30	Ford EF Falcon	Ford Credit Racing	161
3	(Australia) Peter Brock (Australia) Tomas Mezera	05	Holden VR Commodore	Mobil Holden Racing Team	161
4	(Australia) Tony Longhurst (Australia) Steven Ellery	25	Ford EF Falcon	Castrol Longhurst Ford	160
5	(Australia) Larry Perkins (Australia) Russell Ingall	11	Holden VR Commodore	Castrol Perkins Racing	160
6	(Australia) Dick Johnson (Australia) John Bowe	17	Ford EF Falcon	Shell-FAI Racing	159
7	(Australia) Wayne Gardner (Australia) Neil Crompton	7	Holden VR Commodore	Coca-Cola Racing Team	159
8	(Australia) Steven Johnson (Australia) Charlie O'Brien	18	Ford EF Falcon	Shell-FAI Racing	157
9	(Australia) Trevor Ashby (Australia) Steve Reed	3	Holden VP Commodore	Lansvale Smash Repairs	157
10	(Australia) Paul Romano (Australia) Andrew Miedecke	201	Ford EF Falcon	Pack Leader Racing	155
11	(Australia) Max Dumesny (Australia) Kerry Baily	75	Ford EF Falcon	Valvoline / Autopro / JSR	154
12	(Australia) Geoff Kendrick (Australia) Allan McCarthy	96	Holden VR Commodore	Geoff Kendrick	150
13	(Australia) Mark Skaife (Australia) Gary Waldon (Australia) Mark Noske	2	Holden VR Commodore	Gibson Team Sega	138
14	(Australia) Peter Doulman (Australia) John Cotter	29	Holden VP Commodore	M3 Motorsport	123
NC	(Australia) Mike Conway (New Zealand) Miles Pope	79	Holden VP Commodore	Mike Conway	123
NC	(Australia) Mark Larkham (Australia) Cameron McConville	10	Ford EF Falcon	Mitre 10 Racing	59
DNF	(New Zealand) John Faulkner (Australia) Steven Harrington	46	Holden VR Commodore	Betta Electrical / Fisher & Paykel	115
DNF	(Australia) Alan Jones (Australia) Allan Grice	301	Ford EF Falcon	Pack Leader Racing	110
DNF	(New Zealand) Steven Richards (New Zealand) Jim Richards	32	Holden VR Commodore	GRM Valvoline / Cummins	73
DNF	(Australia) Kevin Waldock (Australia) Wayne Park	28	Ford EF Falcon	Playscape Racing	66
DNF	(Australia) Greg Crick (Australia) David Parsons	49	Holden VR Commodore	Alcair Air-conditioning	42
DNF	(Australia) Malcolm Stenniken (Australia) Peter Brown	14	Holden VR Commodore	Malcolm Stenniken	37

=== Race statistics ===
- Pole position: Craig Lowndes, 1:12.9694
- Starters: 22
- Race time of winning car: 3h 25m 50.1828s
- Winning margin: 1.5144s
- Fastest lap: Craig Lowndes, 1:12.9941 (new lap record)

== See also ==
1996 Australian Touring Car season

Preceded by 1995 Sandown 500	Sandown 500; 1996	Succeeded by 1997 Tickford 500
