= 1997 Primus 1000 Classic =

Motor race in Australia

Seasons
- ← 1996 1998 →

Layout of the Mount Panorama Circuit

The 1997 Primus 1000 Classic was a 1000 kilometre endurance race for V8 Supercars, staged at the Mount Panorama Circuit just outside Bathurst in New South Wales, Australia on 19 October 1997.

It was the inaugural "1000 Classic" race, created in response to the desire of V8 Supercar organisers AVESCO to compete at the popular Mount Panorama Circuit outside of the traditional Bathurst 1000 event, as AVESCO were in conflict with the Bathurst 1000 organisers, the Australian Racing Drivers' Club. While many attempts were made to broker a peace between the two bodies, there was a fundamental chasm over the issue of television coverage with AVESCO holding a series contract with Network Ten and the ARDC holding a contract with the Seven Network. The impasse was solved when Bathurst City Council negotiated a deal with AVESCO for a separate race, to be held two weeks after the 1997 AMP Bathurst 1000, which subsequently went ahead with a field of Australian and British Super Touring cars.

The 1997 Primus 1000 Classic was won by Larry Perkins and Russell Ingall driving a Holden Commodore (VS).

== Entry list and class structure ==
=== Class structure ===
Level 1

These were the full-time professional teams, aiming to win the race outright and holders of a 'Level 1' V8 Supercar franchise.

Special Level 1

The smaller, part-time 'Level 2' teams, who wished to run on the tyres of their own choosing.

Level 2

The smaller, part-time 'Level 2' teams, running on a Dunlop control tyre of lower, cheaper specification.

=== Entry list ===
No.	Class	Drivers	Team (Sponsors)	Car	No.	Class	Drivers	Team (Sponsors)	Car
1	L1	(Australia) Glenn Seton (Australia) David Parsons	Glenn Seton Racing (Ford Credit)	Ford Falcon EL	28	L2	(Australia) Kevin Waldock (Australia) John Smith	Playscape Racing (CBS Drill & Blast)	Ford Falcon EF
3	S1	(Australia) Steve Reed (Australia) Trevor Ashby	Lansvale Smash Repairs (Dulux ICI Autocolor)	Holden Commodore VS	33	L2	(Australia) Bob Pearson (Australia) Allan McCarthy	Pro-Duct Motorsport (Pro-Duct Air Conditioning)	Holden Commodore VS
05	L1	(Australia) Peter Brock (Australia) Mark Skaife	Holden Racing Team (Holden, Mobil 1)	Holden Commodore VS	34	L1	(New Zealand) Steven Richards (New Zealand) Jim Richards	Garry Rogers Motorsport (Valvoline, Cummins)	Holden Commodore VS
7	L1	(Australia) Wayne Gardner (Australia) Neil Crompton	Wayne Gardner Racing (Coca-Cola, Donut King)	Holden Commodore VS	36	L2	(Australia) Neil Schembri (Australia) Ian Luff	Schembri Motorsport (Gearbox Motorsport)	Holden Commodore VS
9	L1	(Australia) Alan Jones (United States) Scott Pruett (Australia) Jason Bright	Alan Jones Racing (Komatsu)	Ford Falcon EL	37	L2	(Australia) Alan Taylor (Australia) Bill Attard (Australia) Stephen Bell	Alan Taylor Racing (The Xerox Shop)	Holden Commodore VP
10	L1	(Australia) Mark Larkham (Australia) Andrew Miedecke	Larkham Motorsport (Mitre 10)	Ford Falcon EL	38	S1	(Australia) Mark Poole (Australia) Tony Scott	James Rosenberg Racing (Gawler Farm Machinery, John Deere)	Holden Commodore VS
11	L1	(Australia) Larry Perkins (Australia) Russell Ingall	Perkins Engineering (Castrol)	Holden Commodore VS	39	L2	(Australia) Chris Smerdon (Australia) Charlie Cox	Challenge Motorsport (Vittoria Coffee)	Holden Commodore VS
12	L2	(Australia) Bruce Williams (Australia) Paul Gover	Robert Smith Racing (Simoco Radio Communications)	Holden Commodore VS	40	L2	(Australia) Michael Hart (Australia) Peter Lawrence	Michael Hart Motorsport (SMC Pneumatics)	Holden Commodore VR
13	L2	(Australia) Ryan McLeod (Australia) Darren Pate	John Faulkner Racing (OAMPS Insurance, Bankwest)	Holden Commodore VR	41	L2	(Australia) Garry Willmington (Australia) Bill Sieders	Emerzidis Motorsport (Simon's Earthworks)	Holden Commodore VR
14	L2	(Australia) Malcolm Stenniken (Australia) Peter Gazzard	Malcolm Stenniken Racing (Disc Brakes Australia)	Holden Commodore VS	44	L2	(Australia) Mal Rose (Australia) Kevin Burton	Mal Rose Racing (Fairfax Community Classifieds)	Holden Commodore VS
15	L1	(New Zealand) Greg Murphy (Australia) Craig Lowndes	Holden Racing Team (Holden, Mobil 1)	Holden Commodore VS	45	L1	(Australia) Darren Hossack (Australia) Steven Ellery	Gibson Motorsport (Wynn's)	Holden Commodore VS
16	L2	(Australia) Melinda Price (Australia) Kerryn Brewer	Perkins Engineering (Castrol)	Holden Commodore VS	46	L1	(New Zealand) John Faulkner (United Kingdom) Win Percy	John Faulkner Racing (Betta Electrical, Fisher & Paykel)	Holden Commodore VS
17	L1	(Australia) Dick Johnson (Australia) John Bowe	Dick Johnson Racing (Shell Helix)	Ford Falcon EL	47	S1	(Australia) John Trimbole (Australia) Tomas Mezera	Daily Planet Racing (Bottle Magic)	Holden Commodore VS
18	L1	(Australia) Steven Johnson (New Zealand) Craig Baird	Dick Johnson Racing (Shell Helix)	Ford Falcon EL	49	S1	(Australia) Greg Crick (Australia) Peter Fitzgerald	Greg Crick Motorsport (Ericsson, Alcair Air Conditioning)	Holden Commodore VS
20	L2	(Australia) Ian Palmer (Australia) John English	Palmer Promotions (Contrabart Trade Exchange)	Holden Commodore VS	54	L1	(Australia) Anthony Tratt (Australia) Paul Stokell (Australia) Peter Bradbury	Wayne Gardner Racing (Toll, Coca-Cola)	Holden Commodore VS
21	L2	(Australia) Brian Walden (Australia) Steve Williams	Walden Motorsport (unsponsored)	Holden Commodore VP	58	L2	(Australia) Peter O'Brien (Australia) Brian Callaghan, Jr. (Australia) Ron Barnacle	O'Brien Automotive (Everlast Automotive)	Holden Commodore VR
23	L2	(Australia) Ray Hislop (Australia) Tim Briggs	Ray Hislop Motorsport (Skilled Group)	Ford Falcon EF	62	L2	(Australia) Wayne Russell (Australia) Ric Shaw	Novocastrian Motorsport (Union Steel, Koala Clothing)	Holden Commodore VS
24	S1	(Australia) Paul Romano (Australia) Allan Grice	Romano Racing (Bridgestone)	Holden Commodore VS	74	L2	(Australia) Kevin Heffernan (Australia) Danny Osborne	PACE Racing (Price Attack, Colourscan Printing)	Holden Commodore VS
25	L1	(Australia) Tony Longhurst (Australia) Charlie O'Brien	Longhurst Racing (Castrol)	Ford Falcon EL	79	L2	(Australia) Mike Conway (Australia) Gavin Monaghan	Conway Racing (Cadillac Film Productions)	Ford Falcon EB
26	L2	(Australia) Peter Doulman (Australia) John Cotter	Doulman Automotive (Allen's)	Holden Commodore VP	97	L1	(Australia) Jason Bargwanna (Australia) Mark Noske	Holden Young Lions (Holden)	Holden Commodore VS
27	S1	(Australia) Terry Finnigan (Australia) Terry Shiel	Terry Finnigan Racing (Sony)	Holden Commodore VS					

Icon	Class
L1	Level 1
S1	Special Level 1
L2	Level 2

== Results ==
=== Top 10 Shootout ===
Pos	No	Driver	Team	Car	Time
1	05	(Australia) Mark Skaife	Holden Racing Team	Holden Commodore VS	2:10.0397
2	1	(Australia) Glenn Seton	Glenn Seton Racing	Ford Falcon EL	2:10.8120
3	15	(New Zealand) Greg Murphy	Holden Racing Team	Holden Commodore VS	2:11.0270
4	11	(Australia) Larry Perkins	Perkins Engineering	Holden Commodore VS	2:11.0826
5	97	(Australia) Jason Bargwanna	Holden Young Lions	Holden Commodore VS	2:11.0887
6	9	(Australia) Alan Jones	Alan Jones Racing	Ford Falcon EL	2:11.2317
7	17	(Australia) Dick Johnson	Dick Johnson Racing	Ford Falcon EL	2:11.3336
8	46	(New Zealand) John Faulkner	John Faulkner Racing	Holden Commodore VS	2:11.4114
9	18	(Australia) Steven Johnson	Dick Johnson Racing	Ford Falcon EL	2:11.6200
10	7	(Australia) Wayne Gardner	Wayne Gardner Racing	Holden Commodore VS	2:12.8269

=== Race ===
Pos	Class	No	Drivers	Team	Car	Laps	Time/Retired	Grid
1	L1	11	(Australia) Larry Perkins (Australia) Russell Ingall	Perkins Engineering	Holden Commodore VS	161	6:21:55.5483	4
2	L1	34	(New Zealand) Steven Richards (New Zealand) Jim Richards	Garry Rogers Motorsport	Holden Commodore VS	161	+11.0995	11
3	L1	10	(Australia) Mark Larkham (Australia) Andrew Miedecke	Larkham Motor Sport	Ford Falcon EL	161	+2:01.7408	12
4	L1	18	(Australia) Steven Johnson (New Zealand) Craig Baird	Dick Johnson Racing	Ford Falcon EL	158	+3 laps	9
5	L1	46	(New Zealand) John Faulkner (United Kingdom) Win Percy	John Faulkner Racing	Holden Commodore VS	154	+7 laps	8
6	L1	45	(Australia) Darren Hossack (Australia) Steven Ellery	Gibson Motorsport	Holden Commodore VS	154	+7 laps	15
7	L2	14	(Australia) Malcolm Stenniken (Australia) Peter Gazzard	Malcolm Stenniken	Holden Commodore VS	154	+7 laps	33
8	S1	3	(Australia) Steve Reed (Australia) Trevor Ashby	Lansvale Smash Repairs	Holden Commodore VS	153	+8 laps	18
9	L2	36	(Australia) Neil Schembri (Australia) Ian Luff	Schembri Motorsport	Holden Commodore VS	153	+8 laps	30
10	S1	27	(Australia) Terry Finnigan (Australia) Terry Shiel	Terry Finnigan	Holden Commodore VS	153	+8 laps	17
11	L1	9	(Australia) Alan Jones (United States) Scott Pruett (Australia) Jason Bright	Alan Jones Racing	Ford Falcon EL	153	+8 laps	6
12	L2	16	(Australia) Melinda Price (Australia) Kerryn Brewer	Perkins Engineering	Holden Commodore VS	152	+9 laps	41
13	L2	44	(Australia) Mal Rose (Australia) Kevin Burton	Mal Rose Racing	Holden Commodore VS	150	+11 laps	27
14	S1	49	(Australia) Greg Crick (Australia) Peter Fitzgerald	Greg Crick Motorsport	Holden Commodore VS	150	+11 laps	14
15	L2	20	(Australia) Ian Palmer (Australia) John English	Palmer Promotions	Holden Commodore VS	146	+15 laps	36
16	L2	21	(Australia) Brian Walden (Australia) Steve Williams	Walden Racing	Holden Commodore VP	144	+16 laps	37
17	L2	39	(Australia) Chris Smerdon (Australia) Charlie Cox	Challenge Motorsport	Holden Commodore VS	143	+17 laps	25
18	L2	26	(Australia) Peter Doulman (Australia) John Cotter	Doulman Automotive	Holden Commodore VP	139	+22 laps	21
19	L2	74	(Australia) Kevin Heffernan (Australia) Danny Osborne	PACE Racing	Holden Commodore VS	135	+26 laps	24
NC	L2	40	(Australia) Michael Hart (Australia) Peter Lawrence	Michael Hart	Holden Commodore VR	119	+42 laps	40
NC	L2	37	(Australia) Alan Taylor (Australia) Bill Attard (Australia) Stephen Bell	Alan Taylor Racing	Holden Commodore VP	110	+51 laps	38
DNF	L2	62	(Australia) Wayne Russell (Australia) Ric Shaw	Novocastrian Motorsport	Holden Commodore VS	126	Crash	34
DNF	L1	1	(Australia) Glenn Seton (Australia) David Parsons	Glenn Seton Racing	Ford Falcon EL	121	Tailshaft	2
DNF	L1	25	(Australia) Tony Longhurst (Australia) Charlie O'Brien	Longhurst Racing	Ford Falcon EL	110	Throttle cable	39
DNF	L2	58	(Australia) Peter O'Brien (Australia) Brian Callaghan, Jr. (Australia) Ron Barnacle	O'Brien Automotive	Holden Commodore VR	109	Engine	35
DNF	L2	13	(Australia) Ryan McLeod (Australia) Darren Pate	John Faulkner Racing	Holden Commodore VR	101	Differential	22
DNF	L2	28	(New Zealand) Kevin Waldock (Australia) John Smith	Playscape Racing	Ford Falcon EF	92	Loose Wheel	29
DNF	L1	7	(Australia) Wayne Gardner (Australia) Neil Crompton	Wayne Gardner Racing	Holden Commodore VS	89	Engine	10
DNF	L2	79	(Australia) Mike Conway (Australia) Gavin Monaghan	Cadillac Productions	Ford Falcon EB	79	Gearbox	28
DNF	S1	38	(Australia) Mark Poole (Australia) Tony Scott	James Rosenberg Racing	Holden Commodore VS	74	Gearbox	19
DNF	S1	24	(Australia) Paul Romano (Australia) Allan Grice	Romano Racing	Holden Commodore VS	69	Crash	20
DNF	L2	23	(Australia) Ray Hislop (Australia) Tim Briggs	Ray Hislop	Ford Falcon EF	62	Crash	26
DNF	L2	41	(Australia) Garry Willmington (Australia) Bill Sieders	Garry Willmington Performance	Holden Commodore VR	61	Engine	32
DNF	L1	05	(Australia) Peter Brock (Australia) Mark Skaife	Holden Racing Team	Holden Commodore VS	52	Engine	1
DNF	L2	12	(Australia) Bruce Williams (Australia) Paul Gover	Robert Smith Racing	Holden Commodore VS	46	Steering	31
DNF	L2	33	(Australia) Bob Pearson (Australia) Allan McCarthy	Pro-Duct Motorsport	Holden Commodore VS	43	Driveline	23
DNF	L1	15	(Australia) Craig Lowndes (New Zealand) Greg Murphy	Holden Racing Team	Holden Commodore VS	38	Crash	3
DNF	S1	47	(Australia) (John Trimbole) (Australia) Tomas Mezera	Daily Planet Racing	Holden Commodore VS	25	Crash	13
DNF	L1	17	(Australia) (Dick Johnson) (Australia) John Bowe	Dick Johnson Racing	Ford Falcon EL	17	Crash	7
DNF	L1	54	(Australia) (Peter Bradbury) (Australia) Paul Stokell (Australia) (Anthony Tratt)	Wayne Gardner Racing	Holden Commodore VS	16	Engine	16
DNS	L1	97	(Australia) (Jason Bargwanna) (Australia) (Mark Noske)	Holden Young Lions	Holden Commodore VS		Crash in Warm-Up	5

The names of drivers who did not drive in the actual race are shown in the above table within brackets.

== Broadcast ==
Network 10 broadcast the race for the first time. Barry Sheene provided commentary in the booth for the first part of the race before moving to pit-lane for the remainder.

Network 10
Hosts: Bill Woods, Matthew White
Booth: Leigh Diffey, Mark Oastler, Barry Sheene
Pit-lane: John Smailes

== Statistics ==
- Provisional pole position (Fastest in Qualifying) - #97 Jason Bargwanna - 2:10.9216
- Pole position (Fastest in Top 10 Shootout)- #05 Mark Skaife - 2:10.0397
- Fastest race lap - #11 Larry Perkins - 2:12.3398 (new lap record)
- Winners' average speed - 157.14 km/h (V8 Supercar record)
- Most laps led - Perkins/Ingall - 80

== See also ==
- 1997 Eagle Boys 3 Hour Bathurst Showroom Showdown
