= 1992 Don't Drink Drive Sandown 500 =

Track map of the Sandown Raceway

The 1992 Don't Drink Drive Sandown 500 was an endurance motor race open to Group 3A Touring Cars (commonly known as Group A cars), 1993 Group 3A 5.0 Litre Touring Cars (later to become known as V8 Supercars) and Group 3E Series Production Cars. It was held at the Sandown International Motor Raceway, in Victoria, Australia, on 13 September 1992, over 136 laps of the 3.1 km circuit, a total distance of approximately 422 km. The race, which was the 27th Sandown 500, was won by Larry Perkins and Steve Harrington driving a Holden VL Commodore.

The race was intended to be run over 150 laps, but it was significantly delayed by several periods of slow running behind the pace car. With the Sandown circuit operating under an Environmental Protection Agency curfew of 5pm, the race was shortened to 136 laps.

== Top 10 Qualifiers ==
Although no official Top 10 run off was held during qualifying for the Sandown 500, the top 10 qualifiers were:

Pos	No	Team	Driver	Car	Qual
1	17	Shell Ultra Hi Racing	(Australia) Dick Johnson	Ford Sierra RS500	1:15.87
2	15	Holden Racing Team	(Australia) Tomas Mezera	Holden VP Commodore	1:16.62
3	11	Bob Jane T-Marts Perkins Racing	(Australia) Larry Perkins	Holden VL Commodore SS Group A SV	1:17.50
4	16	Holden Racing Team	(United Kingdom) Win Percy	Holden VP Commodore	1:17.71
5	05	Mobil 1 Racing	(Australia) Peter Brock	Holden VP Commodore	1:17.79
6	30	Peter Jackson Racing	(Australia) Glenn Seton	Ford EB Falcon	1:17.80
7	35	Peter Jackson Racing	(Australia) Wayne Park	Ford Sierra RS500	1:18.16
8	25	Benson & Hedges Racing	(Australia) Tony Longhurst	BMW M3 Evolution	1:18.16
9	17	Shell Ultra Hi Racing	(Australia) Terry Sheil	Ford Sierra RS500	1:18.75
10	13	Ampol Max 3 Racing	(Australia) Bob Jones	Holden VL Commodore SS Group A SV	1:22.76

== Results ==
Position	Group	No.	Entrant	Drivers	Car	Laps
1	3A	11	Bob Jane T-Marts Perkins Racing	(Australia) Larry Perkins (Australia) Steve Harrington	Holden VL Commodore SS Group A SV	136
2	3A	25	Benson & Hedges Racing	(Australia) Tony Longhurst (Australia) Paul Morris	BMW M3 Evolution	136
3	3A (1993)	15	Holden Racing Team	(Australia) Tomas Mezera (Australia) Brad Jones	Holden VP Commodore	133
4	3A	13	Ampol Max 3 Racing	(Australia) Bob Jones (New Zealand) Peter Janson	Holden VL Commodore SS Group A SV	122
5	3E	10	Robinson Racing Developments	(Australia) Ken Douglas (Australia) Kent Youlden	Ford EB Falcon	117
6	3E	4	Robert Ogilvie	(Australia) Robert Ogilvie (Australia) Paul Fordham	Holden VP Commodore SS	116
7	3E	7	Palmer Promotions	(Australia) Ian Palmer (Australia) Brett Bull	Holden VP Commodore SS	114
8	3A	75	Bob Holden Motors	(Australia) Brad Wright (Australia) Ted Dunford	Toyota Corolla	110
9	3E	6	Bridgestone Australia	(Australia) Tony Scott (New Zealand) Ed Lamont	Holden VP Commodore SS	110
10	3A	05	Mobil 1 Racing	(Australia) Peter Brock (Australia) Troy Dunstan	Holden VN Commodore SS Group A SV	110
11	3E	21	Autobarn - Springvale	(Australia) Danny Bogut (Australia) Henry Draper	Suzuki Swift GTi	106
12	3E	14	Murray Carter	(Australia) Murray Carter (Australia) Chris Muscat	Nissan Pulsar SSS	102
DNF	3A	28	Playscape Racing	(Australia) Kevin Waldock (Australia) Brett Peters	Ford Sierra RS500	130
DNF	3A (1993)	16	Holden Racing Team	(United Kingdom) Win Percy (Australia) Allan Grice	Holden VP Commodore	109
DNF	3E	3	Fitzgerald Racing	(Australia) Peter Fitzgerald (Australia) Terry Lewis	Holden VP Commodore SS	109
DNF	3A	18	Shell Ultra Hi Racing	(Australia) Terry Shiel (Australia) Greg Crick	Ford Sierra RS500	108
DNF	3E	41	Caltex CXT Race Team	(Australia) Terry Bosnjak (Australia) Peter Hopwood	Holden VP Commodore SS	100
DNF	3A	39	Protech Microsystems	(Australia) Chris Smerdon (Australia) Mark Poole	Holden VL Commodore SS Group A SV	90
NC	3A	26	Gemspares	(Australia) Daryl Hendrick (Australia) John Blanchard	Holden VL Commodore SS Group A SV	88
DNF	3A	35	Peter Jackson Racing	(Australia) Wayne Park (Australia) David Parsons	Ford Sierra RS500	82
NC	3A	73	Bob Holden Motors	(Australia) Bob Holden (Australia) Dennis Rogers	Toyota Levin	72
NC	3A	52	M3 Motorsport	(Australia) John Cotter (Australia) Peter Doulman	BMW M3	69
DNF	3A	29	Mountain Motorsport	(Australia) Calvin Gardiner (Australia) Mike Conway	Toyota Levin	35
DNF	3A	17	Shell Ultra Hi Racing	(Australia) Dick Johnson (Australia) John Bowe	Ford Sierra RS500	31
DNF	3A (1993)	30	Peter Jackson Racing	(Australia) Glenn Seton (Australia) Alan Jones	Ford EB Falcon	18
DNF	3A	88	Mountain Motorsport	(Australia) Gregg Easton (Australia) Brad Stratton	Toyota Levin	12
DNF	3A	31	Ampol Max 3 Racing	(New Zealand) Robbi Ker (Australia) Don Watson	Holden VL Commodore SS Group A SV	2
DNS	3E	22	Valvoline Oils	(Australia) Melinda Price (New Zealand) Steven Richards	Nissan Pulsar SSS	

== Statistics ==
- Pole Position - 1:15.87 - #17 Dick Johnson - Ford Sierra RS500
- Fastest Lap - 1:16.88 - #17 Dick Johnson/John Bowe - Ford Sierra RS500

== See also ==
1992 Australian Touring Car season

Preceded by 1991 Don't Drink Drive Sandown 500	Sandown 500; 1992	Succeeded by 1993 Sandown 500
