= 1995 Sandown 500 =

Track map of the Sandown Raceway

The 1995 Sandown 500 was an endurance race for 5.0 Litre Touring Cars complying with CAMS Group 3A regulations. The event was staged at the Sandown circuit in Victoria, Australia on 3 September 1995. Race distance was 161 laps of the 3.10 km circuit, totalling 499 km. It was the 30th "Sandown 500".

The race was won by Dick Johnson and John Bowe driving a Ford EF Falcon.

== Race results ==
Pos.	No.	Entrant	Drivers	Car	Laps
1	17	Shell-FAI Racing	(Australia) Dick Johnson (Australia) John Bowe	Ford EF Falcon	161
2	30	Peter Jackson Racing	(Australia) Glenn Seton (Australia) Allan Grice	Ford EF Falcon	161
3	18	Shell-FAI Racing	(Australia) Charlie O'Brien (Australia) Steven Johnson	Ford EF Falcon	161
4	25	Castrol Longhurst Ford	(Australia) Tony Longhurst (Australia) Wayne Park	Ford EF Falcon	160
5	11	Castrol Perkins Racing	(Australia) Larry Perkins (Australia) Russell Ingall	Holden VR Commodore	160
6	24	Romano Racing	(Australia) Paul Romano (Australia) Troy Dunstan	Holden VP Commodore	159
7	6	Pinnacle Motorsport	(Australia) Tony Scott (Australia) Steven Ellery	Holden VR Commodore	158
8	1	Winfield Racing	(Australia) Mark Skaife (New Zealand) Jim Richards	Holden VR Commodore	155
9	28	Playscape Racing	(Australia) Kevin Waldock (Australia) Mark McLaughlin	Ford EF Falcon	155
10	38	John Deer Pty Ltd	(Australia) Mark Poole (Australia) Ed Ordynski	Holden VP Commodore	155
11	3	Lansvale Samsh Repairs	(Australia) Trevor Ashby (Australia) Steve Reed	Holden VP Commodore	150
N/C	20	Palmer Promotions	(Australia) Ian Palmer (Australia) Brett Peters	Holden VR Commodore	80
DNF	7	Coca-Cola Racing	(Australia) Wayne Gardner (Australia) Neil Crompton	Holden VR Commodore	139
DNF	35	Peter Jackson Racing	(Australia) Alan Jones (Australia) David Parsons	Ford EF Falcon	136
DNF	015	Holden Racing Team	(Australia) Craig Lowndes (New Zealand) Greg Murphy	Holden VR Commodore	132
DNF	55	Parsons Racing	(Australia) David Parsons (Australia) John Goss	Holden VR Commodore	126
DNF	39	Protech Computers	(Australia) Chris Smerdon (Australia) Cameron McConville	Holden VR Commodore	123
DNF	10	Mitre 10 Racing	(Australia) Mark Larkham (Australia) Warwick Rooklyn	Ford EF Falcon	111
DNF	4	Coca-Cola Racing	(Australia) Brad Jones (United Kingdom) Win Percy	Holden VR Commodore	98
DNF	49	Alcair Airconditioning	(Australia) David Attard (Australia) Greg Crick	Holden VR Commodore	93
DNF	05	Holden Racing Team	(Australia) Peter Brock (Australia) Tomas Mezera	Holden VR Commodore	67

=== Race statistics ===
- Pole position: Craig Lowndes & Greg Murphy, 1m 13.1494s
- Race time of winning car: 3h 30m 22.82s
- Fastest race lap: Craig Lowndes, 1m 13.7557s on lap 36

== See also ==
1995 Australian Touring Car season

Preceded by 1994 Sandown 500	Sandown 500; 1995	Succeeded by 1996 Tickford 500
