= Ford Tickford Racing =

Ford Tickford Racing may refer to:

- Glenn Seton Racing - former Australian racing team
- Tickford Racing - current Australian racing team
