= 1998 Tickford 500 =

Track map of the Sandown Raceway

The 1998 Tickford 500 was an endurance motor race for V8 Supercars. The event, which was the 33rd running of the Sandown 500, was held on 13 September 1998 at the Sandown International Motor Raceway. The race was won by Larry Perkins and Russell Ingall driving a Perkins Engineering Holden VT Commodore.

== Class Structure ==
While still following long-term plans to abandon class structures within V8 Supercar, a class was instigated for the 1998 Tickford 500 and FAI 1000 Classic endurance races allowing smaller teams to save considerable budget by running a Dunlop control tyre, indicated here by CT. Most teams, particularly the professional teams, preferred to race with freedom of tyre choice, indicated by the class OC.

== Top Ten Shootout ==
The top ten cars from Qualifying contested a Top Ten Shootout to determine the first ten grid positions for the race. Shootout results were as follows:

Pos	No	Team	Driver	Car	Time
Pole	50	Holden Racing Team	(New Zealand) Greg Murphy	Holden VS Commodore	1:22.3834
2	1	Holden Racing Team	(Australia) Mark Skaife	Holden VT Commodore	1:22.4050
3	18	Dick Johnson Racing	(Australia) John Bowe	Ford EL Falcon	1:22.4548
4	4	Stone Brothers Racing	(Australia) Jason Bright	Ford EL Falcon	1:22.4990
5	5	Glenn Seton Racing	(Australia) Glenn Seton	Ford EL Falcon	1:23.3160
6	10	Larkham Motor Sport	(Australia) Mark Larkham	Ford EL Falcon	1:23.7831
7	25	Longhurst Racing	(Australia) Tony Longhurst	Ford EL Falcon	1:24.1355
8	17	Dick Johnson Racing	(Australia) Dick Johnson	Ford EL Falcon	1:24.3714
9	35	Garry Rogers Motorsport	(Australia) Jason Bargwanna	Holden VS Commodore	1:24.6735
10	11	Perkins Engineering	(Australia) Larry Perkins	Holden VT Commodore	1:25.9808

== Official results ==
Race results were as follows:

Pos	Class	No	Team	Drivers	Car	Laps	Qual Pos	Shootout Pos
1	OC	11	Perkins Engineering	(Australia) Larry Perkins (Australia) Russell Ingall	Holden VT Commodore	147	7	10
2	OC	1	Holden Racing Team	(Australia) Craig Lowndes (Australia) Mark Skaife	Holden VT Commodore	147	1	2
3	OC	18	Dick Johnson Racing	(Australia) John Bowe (Australia) Cameron McConville	Ford EL Falcon	147	5	3
4	OC	5	Glenn Seton Racing	(Australia) Glenn Seton (Australia) Neil Crompton	Ford EL Falcon	145	6	5
5	OC	4	Stone Brothers Racing	(Australia) Jason Bright (New Zealand) Steven Richards	Ford EL Falcon	145	3	4
6	OC	50	Holden Racing Team	(New Zealand) Greg Murphy (Australia) Mark Noske	Holden VS Commodore	145	2	1
7	OC	35	Garry Rogers Motorsport	(Australia) Jason Bargwanna (New Zealand) Jim Richards	Holden VS Commodore	144	8	9
8	OC	7	Gibson Motorsport	(Australia) Darren Hossack (Australia) Darren Pate	Holden VS Commodore	143	16	
9	OC	32	Tomas Mezera Motorsport	(Australia) Tomas Mezera (Australia) Terry Finnigan	Holden VT Commodore	143	17	
10	OC	2	Gibson Motorsport	(Australia) David Parsons (New Zealand) Simon Wills	Holden VS Commodore	143	22	
11	OC	10	Larkham Motor Sport	(Australia) Mark Larkham (Australia) Brad Jones	Ford EL Falcon	142	4	6
12	CT	3	Lansvale Racing Team	(Australia) Steve Reed (Australia) Trevor Ashby	Holden VS Commodore	141	23	
13	OC	49	Greg Crick Motorsport	(Australia) Greg Crick (Australia) Dean Crosswell	Holden VS Commodore	139	21	
14	OC	16	Perkins Engineering	(Australia) Melinda Price (Australia) Kerryn Brewer	Holden VS Commodore	138	24	
15	CT	99	Clive Wiseman Racing	(Australia) Mick Donaher (Australia) Dean Lindstrom	Holden VS Commodore	133	26	
16	OC	38	James Rosenberg Racing	(Australia) Mark Poole (Australia) Tony Scott	Holden VS Commodore	133	13	
17	OC	46	John Faulkner Racing	(New Zealand) John Faulkner (Australia) Todd Kelly	Holden VS Commodore	131	33	
18	CT	54	Simon Emerzidis	(Australia) Simon Emerzidis (Australia) Garry Willmington	Ford EL Falcon	128	25	
19	CT	14	Imrie Motor Sport	(Australia) Mike Imrie (Australia) Rodney Crick	Holden VS Commodore	127	31	
20	CT	72	Robert Smith Racing	(Australia) Robert Smith (Australia) Bruce Williams	Holden VS Commodore	123	27	
21	CT	48	Rod Smith Racing	(Australia) D'arcy Russell (Australia) Colin Ivory	Holden VS Commodore	121	30	
22	OC	79	Cadillac Productions	(Australia) Mike Conway (Australia) Chris Hones	Ford EL Falcon	119	29	
DNF	OC	75	Paul Little Racing	(Australia) Anthony Tratt (Australia) Bob Jones	Ford EL Falcon	125	20	
DNF	OC	43	Paul Weel Racing	(Australia) Paul Weel (Australia) Neal Bates	Ford EL Falcon	122	18	
NC	OC	8	Perkins Engineering	(Australia) Dugal McDougall (Australia) Jason Wylie	Holden VS Commodore	109	19	
DNF	CT	55	Rod Nash Racing	(Australia) Rod Nash (Australia) Darren Edwards	Holden VS Commodore	102	28	
DNF	OC	17	Dick Johnson Racing	(Australia) Dick Johnson (Australia) Steven Johnson	Ford EL Falcon	99	9	8
DNF	CT	77	V8 Racing	(Australia) Richard Mork (Australia) Bill Sieders	Holden VP Commodore	94	32	
DNF	OC	96	Wayne Gardner Racing	(Australia) Wayne Gardner (Australia) Paul Stokell	Holden VS Commodore	73	14	
DNF	OC	34	Garry Rogers Motorsport	(Australia) Garth Tander (Australia) Cameron McLean	Holden VS Commodore	30	12	
DNF	OC	25	Longhurst Racing	(Australia) Tony Longhurst (Australia) Geoff Brabham	Ford EL Falcon	7	10	7
DNF	OC	24	Romano Racing	(Australia) Paul Romano (Australia) Steve Ellery	Holden VR Commodore	6	15	
DNF	OC	9	Longhurst Racing	(Australia) Alan Jones (Australia) Adam Macrow	Ford EL Falcon	0	11	
DNS	OC	95	Road Care Racing	(Australia) Steve Cramp (Australia) Gary Baxter	Ford EL Falcon	-		

Note: The race was scheduled to be run over 161 laps, however the slower lap times dictated by the wet weather conditions resulted in the race being shortened after reaching its three-hour-45-minute time limit.

== Statistics ==
- Provisional pole position (qualifying) - #1 Mark Skaife - 1:11.9148
- Pole position (Top Ten Shootout) - #50 Greg Murphy - 1:22.3834
- Fastest race lap - #4 Jason Bright - 1:13.2534 (152 km/h)
- Winners' race time - 03:45:09.5507
- Race average speed - 121 km/h

Preceded by 1997 Tickford 500	Sandown 500; 1998	Succeeded by 2001 Clarion Sandown 500
