= 1993 Sandown 500 =

Track map of the Sandown Raceway

The 1993 Sandown 500 was an endurance race for Group 3A Touring Cars and selected Group 3E Series Production Cars, held at the Sandown circuit in Victoria, Australia on 12 September 1993. The event was staged over 161 laps of the 3.10 km circuit, a total distance of 499 km. It was the 28th Sandown 500.

The race was won by Geoff Brabham and David Parsons driving a Ford Falcon EB entered by Peter Jackson Racing.

== Classes ==
Cars competed in two classes:

- A: Group 3A Touring Cars
- E: Group 3E Production Cars

== Results ==
Pos.	Class	No.	Entrant	Drivers	Car	Laps	Qual Pos
1	A	35	Peter Jackson Racing	(Australia) Geoff Brabham (Australia) David Parsons	Ford EB Falcon	161	8
2	A	12	Ampol Max 3 Racing	(Australia) Bob Jones (Australia) Greg Crick	Holden VP Commodore	158	11
3	A	55	Advantage Racing	(Australia) Steve Harrington (Australia) Troy Dunstan	Holden VP Commodore	157	9
4	A	41	Daily Planet	(Australia) John Trimbole (Australia) Rohan Cooke	Holden VL Commodore SS Group A SV	155	13
5	A	44	Toll Express	(New Zealand) Peter Janson (Australia) Anthony Tratt	Holden VL Commodore SS Group A SV	148	14
6	A	17	Shell Racing	(Australia) Dick Johnson (Australia) John Bowe (Australia) Cameron McConville	Ford EB Falcon	147	6
7	A 2 Litre	77	Phoenix Motorsport	(Australia) Steven Ellery (Australia) Garry Gosatti	Ford Sierra	140	18
8	E	10	Kevin Burton	(Australia) Mal Rose (Australia) Kevin Burton	Ford EB Falcon SS	134	
9	E	38	Denis Cribbin	(Australia) Denis Cribbin (Australia) Peter Vorst	Ford EB Falcon	132	
10	E	33	David Sala	(Australia) Steve Swaine (Australia) Danny Bogut (Australia) David Sala	Holden VP Commodore SS	130	
11	E	18	Murray Carter	(Australia) Murray Carter (New Zealand) Ed Lamont	Nissan Pulsar SSS	129	
12	A	28	Playscape Racing	(Australia) Kevin Waldock (Australia) Brett Peters	Ford EB Falcon	122	10
DNF	A	16	Holden Racing Team	(Australia) Allan Grice (Australia) Brad Jones (Australia) Tomas Mezera	Holden VP Commodore	150	7
DNF	A	05	Mobil 1 Racing	(Australia) Peter Brock (Australia) Charlie O'Brien	Holden VP Commodore	133	4
DNF	A	30	Peter Jackson Racing	(Australia) Glenn Seton (Australia) Alan Jones	Ford EB Falcon	124	3
NC	E	6	Chris Muscat	(Australia) Chris Muscat (Australia) Kent Youlden	Nissan Pulsar SSS	108	
NC	A	21	Mocopan Coffee Pty Ltd	(Australia) Laurie Donaher (Australia) Michael Donaher	Holden VL Commodore SS Group A SV	104	16
DNF	A	11	Castrol Perkins Racing Team	(Australia) Larry Perkins (Australia) Gregg Hansford	Holden VP Commodore	101	2
DNF	A	39	Protech Computers	(Australia) Brett Youlden (Australia) Chris Smerdon (Australia) Mark Poole	Holden VL Commodore SS Group A SV	80	12
NC	A	31	Kart Mania	(Australia) Tony Scott (Australia) Grant Munday	Holden VL Commodore SS Group A SV	68	15
DNF	A 2 Litre	8	Caltex Team Toyota	(Australia) Colin Bond (Australia) Terry Bosnjak	Toyota Corolla Seca	63	17
DNF	A	7	Bob Forbes Corp Pty Ltd	(Australia) Neil Crompton (Australia) Mark Gibbs	Holden VP Commodore	61	5
DNF	A	15	Holden Racing Team	(Australia) Tomas Mezera (Australia) Mike Preston	Holden VP Commodore	4	1
DNS	A 2 Litre	13	Bob Holden Motors	(Australia) Bob Holden	Toyota Sprinter		

== See also ==
1993 Australian Touring Car season

Preceded by 1992 Don't Drink Drive Sandown 500	Sandown 500; 1993	Succeeded by 1994 Sandown 500
