= David Parsons (racing driver) =

Australian racing driver

- Nationality: (Australia) Australian
- Born: David John Parsons; 17 May 1959 (age 67) Devonport, Tasmania
- Relatives: Graham Parsons (father)

ATCC / V8 Supercar
- Years active: 1982–2000
- Teams: Cadbury Schweppes Racing; Holden Dealer Team; Perkins Engineering; Glenn Seton Racing; Gibson Motorsport; Challenge Recruitment; Romano Racing
- Starts: 23
- Best finish: 7th in 1983

Championship titles
- 1987 1993: Bathurst 1000; Sandown 500

David John "Skippy" Parsons (born 17 May 1959 in Devonport, Tasmania), is a retired Australian racing driver, who, while never a full-time racing driver, drove for some of the leading racing teams in Australia including the Holden Dealer Team, Perkins Engineering, Glenn Seton Racing and Gibson Motorsport.

== Career ==
=== Group C ===
The son of Tasmanian touring car racer Graham Parsons, David Parsons, a dairy farmer, began emerging onto the national scene racing a Holden Commodore (VC) in the 1982 Australian Touring Car Championship, making his debut at his home track, Symmons Plains in Tasmania. Embraced as an endurance co-driver by gentleman privateer racer Peter Janson, he showed pace on his way to fourth outright at the 1982 James Hardie 1000, as well as qualifying Janson's Commodore third for the 1983 race.

For his fourth place finish in the 1982 James Hardie 1000, Parsons won the Bathurst 1000's "Rookie of the Year" award.

This, and his performances in his self-funded Commodore in the 1983 ATCC, brought Parsons to the attention of Peter Brock and the Holden Dealer Team, and with the help of Janson he was drafted into the HDT for the 1984 Australian Endurance Championship. Parsons co-drove with John Harvey to a DNF in the Oran Park 250 in Brock's ATCC car, before the pair went on to finish third in the 1984 Castrol 500 at Sandown in the second of the team's new VK Commodores. Parson's actually spent the bulk of his stint in the car at Sandown trying to keep the drivers side door closed as the latch had broken and the door was swinging open on right hand turns, of which the new 3.878 km (2.410 mi) International Circuit (being a circuit that runs anti-clockwise) now had 9.

From there Harvey/Parsons finished second in the 1984 James Hardie 1000 behind teammates Brock and Larry Perkins, with Parsons following Brock across the finish line in a 1-2 form finish. Late in the James Hardie 1000, Parsons was "let off the leash" by team owner Brock who told him to go for second place which was held at the time by 1980 Formula One World Champion Alan Jones who was driving Warren Cullen's similar VK Commodore. Parsons responded to the challenge and reduced the gap to the former World Champion from over a minute to under two seconds before Jones was forced to pit with four laps remaining for fuel and attention to the cars non-existent rear brakes (unfortunately for Jones, the stop not only saw Parsons go past but also Gregg Hansford in Allan Moffat's Mazda RX-7, dropping the Commodore to fourth place and off the podium).

After finishing seventh in the 1983 ATCC in his own privately entered Holden Commodore SS, Parsons drove his 1983 Bathurst Commodore for Peter Janson in the opening two rounds of the 1984 championship at Sandown and Symmons Plains, but Janson did not have the funds to run the full series and these were Parson's only drives in the championship which saw him fall to 17th in the standings.

=== Group A ===
Parsons was retained as a driver for the HDT into 1985, although results were harder to come by as the Commodore initially struggled with engine unreliability in Australia's move to the FIA's Group A rules. The highlight of the year for the Tasmanian dairy farmer was out qualifying team leader Brock at the 1985 James Hardie 1000 (the only time that Brock as the HDT owner was out-qualified by a teammate). Parsons left HDT in 1986 to join Perkins in his new team Perkins Engineering, but was let go in early 1987 with Perkins opting for someone with "more experience" after Parsons had crashed the Commodore in the Wellington 500 (Perkins would select 1967 World Champion Denny Hulme as Parsons replacement with the pair going on to win the Pukekohe 500 a week after Wellington). Parsons rejoined the HDT, now without any official support from Holden following the company's split with Brock in February 1987, and joined Brock and Neville Crichton at the Spa 24 Hours round of the inaugural World Touring Car Championship (WTCC). The trio failed to finish the race.

Heading into the 1987 James Hardie 1000 (which was also a round of the WTCC), the Holden Dealer Team was expected to do little more the make up the numbers against the strength of the factory supported European Ford and BMW teams. When the No. 05 car Parsons shared with Brock experienced a major engine failure in the early running, their effort looked set to be little more than a footnote (Brock had pitted a number of laps early and put Parsons into the car leading to speculation that Brock knew the engine was dying and wanted himself in the pits rather than stranded out on the track, though Parsons did manage to get the heavily smoking No. 05 back to the pits). First Brock, then Parsons stepped aboard the team's second car, the No. 10, which had been driven to that point of the race by the 1983 Australian Endurance Champion Peter McLeod. Inspired driving on variable surface as rain plagued the second half of the race, good strategy and a lucky break with safety car procedure saw the team claw their way past the BMW M3s as they failed, and the Nissan Skyline turbos and into third position behind the almost flawless 1-2 finish of the Eggenberger Motorsport Ford Sierra RS500s. During his stint at the wheel, Parsons recorded a time of 2:25.37 on lap 129 which was credited as the No. 10's fastest race lap in the 1987 1000 (Brock's fastest recorded time was a 2:25.55 on lap 90 while McLeod had posted a 2:26.58 on lap 58).

After scrutineering at Bathurst in 1987, there had been rumours about the legality of the Eggenberger built Sierra's, specifically to do with oversized wheel arches. On the Thursday before qualifying, an official protest was lodged against the Sierra's, which was held over due to the lack of a road going RS500 in Australia to compare them with. Eventually, after nearly four months and an eventual disqualification and later appeal by Eggenberger, the two Sierras were disqualified for having oversize wheel arches allowing them to fit larger wheels, giving McLeod, Brock and Parsons the race win.

Parsons stayed with the team into 1988 as they transitioned from V8 Holden Commodores to 4 cyl BMW M3s, although by now in Australia the giant-killers of 1987 had become little more than class runners in the face of the all-powerful Sierras. After then sitting out 1989 during which time the Brock team also switched to running the RS500 Sierras, Parsons returned to Brock's team in 1990, teaming with Andrew Miedecke and Charlie O'Brien to finish 11th at the 1990 Tooheys 1000 at Bathurst, 12 laps down on the winning Holden Racing Team SS Group A Commodore of Allan Grice and Win Percy.

Parsons then went on to join Glenn Seton Racing in 1991 where he became a regular co-driver for the team for the next seven years, continuing to race with the team into the V8 Supercar era. The highlight of his time with GSR was winning the 1993 Sandown 500 co-driving a Ford Falcon (EB) with Geoff Brabham and qualifying in the top-ten at the 1991 Tooheys 1000 in a Sierra.

Parsons came close to winning his second Bathurst 1000 in 1995 when team boss and co-driver Glenn Seton led the race with just ten laps to go. However, a dropped valve in the Barry Seton built Ford V8 saw the Ford Falcon (EF) retire on lap 152, handing the win to Parsons' former teammate Larry Perkins. The loss was hard to take as the car had led for most of the race and until the engine went sour on lap 151, Seton held a 10-second lead over Perkins. 1995 was also the 30th anniversary of Bo Seton's only win in 1965. Parsons was actually to drive the team's second car with lead driver Alan Jones, while veteran Allan Grice was entered as Seton's co-driver. However, after early practice had seen Parsons lapping quicker than Grice, Glenn Seton made the decision to move Parsons into the lead car with himself while Grice was moved to partner Jones. Ironically, the Jones/Grice car would finish second behind the Commodore of Perkins and Russell Ingall.

=== V8 Supercars ===
From 1998 onwards, Parsons was a hired gun, driving for Gibson Motorsport and Owen Parkinson Racing, including co-drives with the other racing driver named David "Truckie" Parsons. His final Bathurst appearance was alongside Paul Romano in 2000. Since then Parsons has made occasional one-off appearances in various sedan based categories.

== Career results ==
Season	Series	Position	Car	Team
1982	Australian Touring Car Championship	12th	Holden VC Commodore	David Parsons
1982	Australian Endurance Championship	48th	Holden VH Commodore SS	Cadbury-Schweppes Pty. Ltd.
1983	Australian Touring Car Championship	7th	Holden VH Commodore SS	David Parsons
1984	Australian Touring Car Championship	17th	Holden VH Commodore SS	Cadbury Schweppes Racing
1984	Australian Endurance Championship	6th	Holden VK Commodore SS	Holden Dealer Team
1985	Australian Touring Car Championship	25th	Holden VK Commodore SS	Holden Dealer Team
1986	Australian Endurance Championship	64th	Holden VK Commodore SS Group A	Perkins Motorsport
1987	Australian Touring Car Championship	24th	Holden VK Commodore SS Group A	HDT Racing P/L
1988	Australian Touring Car Championship	14th	BMW M3	Mobil 1 Racing
1988	Asia-Pacific Touring Car Championship	NC	BMW M3	Mobil 1 Racing
1990	Australian Endurance Championship	16th	Ford Sierra RS500	Mobil 1 Racing
1992	Australian Touring Car Championship	27th	Ford Sierra RS500	Glenn Seton Racing
1999	Shell Championship Series	28th	Holden VS Commodore; Holden VT Commodore	Owen Parkinson Racing; Gibson Motorsport

=== Complete Australian Touring Car Championship results ===
(key) (Races in bold indicate pole position) (Races in italics indicate fastest lap)

Year	Team	Car	1	2	3	4	5	6	7	8	9	10	11	12	13	DC	Points
1982	David Parsons	Holden VC Commodore Holden VH Commodore SS	SAN	CAL	SYM; 5	ORA	LAK; 4	WAN; Ret	AIR; 4	SUR; 4						12th	14
1983	David Parsons	Holden VH Commodore SS	CAL; Ret	SAN; Ret	SYM; 4	WAN; 5	AIR; Ret	SUR	ORA; 8	LAK; 5						7th	57
1984	Cadbury-Schweppes Racing	Holden VH Commodore SS	SAN; 9	SYM; 7	WAN	SUR	ORA	LAK	AIR							17th	20
1985	Holden Dealer Team	Holden VK Commodore SS	WIN	SAN	SYM	WAN	AIR	CAL	SUR	LAK	AMA; 6	ORA				25th	13
1987	HDT Racing P/L	Holden VK Commodore SS Group A	CAL	SYM	LAK	WAN	AIR	SUR	SAN; 8	AMA	ORA					24th	3
1988	Mobil 1 Racing	BMW M3	CAL	SYM; 6	WIN	WAN	AIR	LAK	SAN	AMA	ORA					14th	6
1992	Peter Jackson Racing	Ford Sierra RS500	AMA	SAN	SYM	WIN	LAK	ECR	MAL	WAN	ORA; 14					27th	8
1999	Owen Parkinson Racing Gibson Motorsport	Holden VS Commodore Holden VT Commodore	ECR	ADE	BAR	PHI	HID	SAN	QLD	CAL	SYM; 24	WIN; 28	ORA	QLD; 5	BAT; 11	28th	446
2000	Romano Racing	Holden VS Commodore	PHI	BAR	ADE	ECR	HID	CAN	QLD	WIN	ORA	CAL	QLD	SAN	BAT; Ret	NC	0

=== Complete World Touring Car Championship results ===
(key) (Races in bold indicate pole position) (Races in italics indicate fastest lap)

Year	Team	Car	1	2	3	4	5	6	7	8	9	10	11	DC	Points
1987	(Australia) HDT Racing P/L	Holden VL Commodore SS Group A	MNZ	JAR	DIJ	NUR	SPA; Ret	BNO	SIL	BAT ovr:1 cls:1	CLD ovr:8 cls:4	WEL ovr:5 cls:4	FJI	NC	0

* Despite winning the James Hardie 1000 at Bathurst, Parsons scored no World Championship points as he wasn't a registered WTCC competitor.

=== Complete Asia-Pacific Touring Car Championship results ===
(key) (Races in bold indicate pole position) (Races in italics indicate fastest lap)

Year	Team	Car	1	2	3	4	DC	Points
1988	(Australia) Mobil 1 Racing	BMW M3	BAT; Ret	WEL	PUK	FJI	NC	0

=== Complete Bathurst 1000 results ===
Year	Car#	Team	Co-drivers	Car	Class	Laps	Overall position	Class position
1982	3	(Australia) Cadbury Schweppes Racing	(New Zealand) Peter Janson	Holden VH Commodore SS	A	158	4th	4th
1983	3	(Australia) Cadbury Schweppes Racing	(New Zealand) Peter Janson	Holden VH Commodore SS	A	106	DNF	DNF
1984	25	(Australia) Holden Dealer Team	(Australia) John Harvey	Holden VK Commodore SS	Group C	161	**2nd**	**2nd**
1985	7	(Australia) Holden Dealer Team	(Australia) John Harvey	Holden VK Commodore SS	A	96	DNF	DNF
1986	11	(Australia) Enzed Team Perkins	(Australia) Larry Perkins	Holden VK Commodore SS Group A	C	140	25th	18th
1987	10	(Australia) HDT Racing P/L	(Australia) Peter McLeod (Australia) Peter Brock (Australia) Jon Crooke	Holden VL Commodore SS Group A	1	158	**1st**	**1st**
1987	05	(Australia) HDT Racing P/L	(Australia) Peter Brock	Holden VL Commodore SS Group A	1	34	DNF	DNF
1988	57	(Australia) Mobil 1 Racing	(New Zealand) Jim Richards (Australia) Neil Crompton	BMW M3	B	68	DNF	DNF
1990	6	(Australia) Mobil 1 Racing	(Australia) Andrew Miedecke (Australia) Charlie O'Brien	Ford Sierra RS500	1	149	11th	11th
1991	35	(Australia) Peter Jackson Racing	(Australia) Wayne Park	Ford Sierra RS500	1	60	DNF	DNF
1992	35	(Australia) Peter Jackson Racing	(Australia) Wayne Park	Ford Sierra RS500	A	136	8th	7th
1993	35	(Australia) Peter Jackson Racing	(Australia) Geoff Brabham	Ford EB Falcon	A	154	6th	6th
1994	30	(Australia) Peter Jackson Racing	(Australia) Alan Jones	Ford EB Falcon	A	52	DNF	DNF
1995	30	(Australia) Peter Jackson Racing	(Australia) Glenn Seton	Ford EF Falcon		152	DNF	DNF
1996	30	(Australia) Ford Credit Racing	(Australia) Glenn Seton	Ford EF Falcon		152	15th	15th
1997	1	(Australia) Ford Credit Racing	(Australia) Glenn Seton	Ford EL Falcon	L1	121	DNF	DNF
1998	2	(Australia) Gibson Motorsport	(New Zealand) Simon Wills	Holden VS Commodore	OC	57	DNF	DNF
1999	73	(Australia) Gibson Motorsport	(Australia) David Parsons	Holden VT Commodore		159	11th	11th
2000	24	(Australia) Romano Racing	(Australia) Paul Romano	Holden VS Commodore		23	DNF	DNF

=== Complete Spa 24 Hours results ===
Year	Team	Co-drivers	Car	Class	Laps	Overall position	Class position
1987	(Australia) HDT Racing P/L	(Australia) Peter Brock (New Zealand) Neville Crichton	Holden VL Commodore SS Group A	Div.3	206	DNF	DNF

=== Complete Sandown Enduro results ===
Year	Team	Co-drivers	Car	Class	Laps	Overall position	Class position
1982	(Australia) Cadbury Schweppes Racing		Holden VH Commodore SS	D	NA	DNF	DNF
1983	(Australia) Cadbury Schweppes Racing	(New Zealand) Peter Janson	Holden VH Commodore SS	Over 3000cc	NA	DNF	DNF
1984	(Australia) Holden Dealer Team	(Australia) John Harvey	Holden VK Commodore SS	Over 3000cc	127	**3rd**	**3rd**
1985	(Australia) Holden Dealer Team	(Australia) John Harvey	Holden VK Commodore SS	A	78	DNF	DNF
1986	(Australia) Perkins Engineering	(Australia) Larry Perkins	Holden VK Commodore SS Group A	B	122	14th	14th
1987	(Australia) Holden Dealer Team	(Australia) Peter Brock	Holden VL Commodore SS Group A	A	113	DNF	DNF
1988	(Australia) Mobil 1 Racing	(Australia) Peter Brock (New Zealand) Jim Richards	BMW M3	B	122	7th	**1st**
1988	(Australia) Mobil 1 Racing	(Australia) Neil Crompton (Australia) Peter Brock	BMW M3	B	58	DNF	DNF
1990	(Australia) Mobil 1 Racing	(Australia) Peter Brock (Australia) Andrew Miedecke	Ford Sierra RS500	Div.1	151	4th	4th
1992	(Australia) Peter Jackson Racing	(Australia) Wayne Park	Ford Sierra RS500	3A	82	DNF	DNF
1993	(Australia) Peter Jackson Racing	(Australia) Geoff Brabham	Ford EB Falcon	V8	161	**1st**	**1st**
1994	(Australia) Peter Jackson Racing	(Australia) Alan Jones	Ford EB Falcon	V8	147	DNF	DNF
1995	(Australia) Peter Jackson Racing	(Australia) Alan Jones	Ford EF Falcon		136	DNF	DNF
1996	(Australia) Ford Credit Racing	(Australia) Glenn Seton	Ford EF Falcon		161	**2nd**	**2nd**
1997	(Australia) Ford Credit Racing	(Australia) Glenn Seton	Ford EL Falcon		150	11th	11th
1998	(Australia) Gibson Motorsport	(New Zealand) Simon Wills	Holden VS Commodore	OC	143	10th	10th

Sporting positions
Preceded by Allan Grice; Graeme Bailey	Winner of the Bathurst 1000; 1987 (with Peter Brock & Peter McLeod)	Succeeded by Tony Longhurst; Tomas Mezera
