= Ford Falcon (EB) =

Australian full-size car

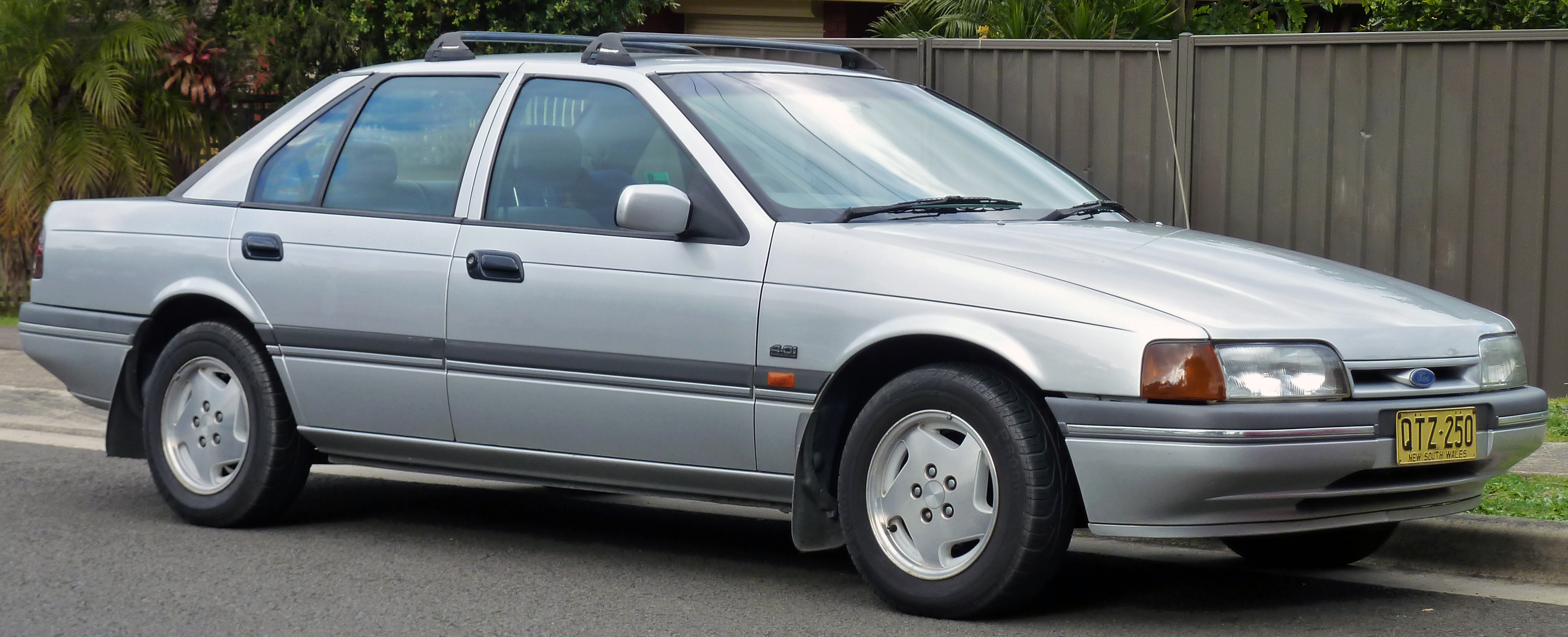
- Ford Fairmont (EB) sedan

Overview
- Manufacturer: Ford Australia
- Also called: Ford Fairmont (EB)
- Production: July 1991 – August 1993

Body and chassis
- Class: Full-size
- Body style: 4-door sedan 5-door station wagon
- Layout: Front-engine, rear-wheel-drive
- Related: Ford Fairlane (NC); Ford LTD (DC)

Powertrain
- Engine: 3.9 L Ford I6 (petrol; EB I); 4.0 L Ford I6 (petrol; EB II); 5.0 L Windsor V8 (petrol)
- Transmission: 4-speed M85LE automatic (3.9 I6); 4-speed M91LE automatic (4.0 I6); 4-speed M95LE automatic (V8); 5-speed manual

Chronology
- Predecessor: Ford Falcon (EA)
- Successor: Ford Falcon (ED)

The Ford Falcon (EB) is a full-sized car that was produced by Ford Australia from 1991 to 1993. It was the second iteration of the fifth generation of the Falcon and also included the Ford Fairmont (EB)—the luxury-oriented version. It launched shortly before the Holden Commodore VP.

== Introduction and changes ==
Visually, the 1991 EB Falcon remained nearly identical to its predecessor, including carrying over the 3.9-litre Ford straight-six engine and four-speed M85LE automatic. The most noticeable changes were the transfer of the Ford emblem from the tip of the bonnet to the grille and a full-length applique bridging the gap between the tail lights, featuring reversing lamps on both sides of the rear number plate. Additionally, the C-pillar air vents were removed. The return of the V8 engine since its demise in the Ford Falcon (XE) of 1982 was welcomed by the motoring press. The V8 was paired to the four-speed M95LE automatic transmission. Changes also were made to the front suspension geometry, giving the EB a much better level of grip and steering feel. With the new model, Ford reintroduced the sports oriented GT specification level, an exclusive 250-unit run celebrating the 25th anniversary of the first original Falcon GT. The first XR6 (EB II Sedan) and XR8 sports models appeared in the EB series.

== Model range ==
=== Series I ===
The first series of models comprised these variants:

- GL
- S
- S XR8
- Fairmont
- Fairmont Ghia
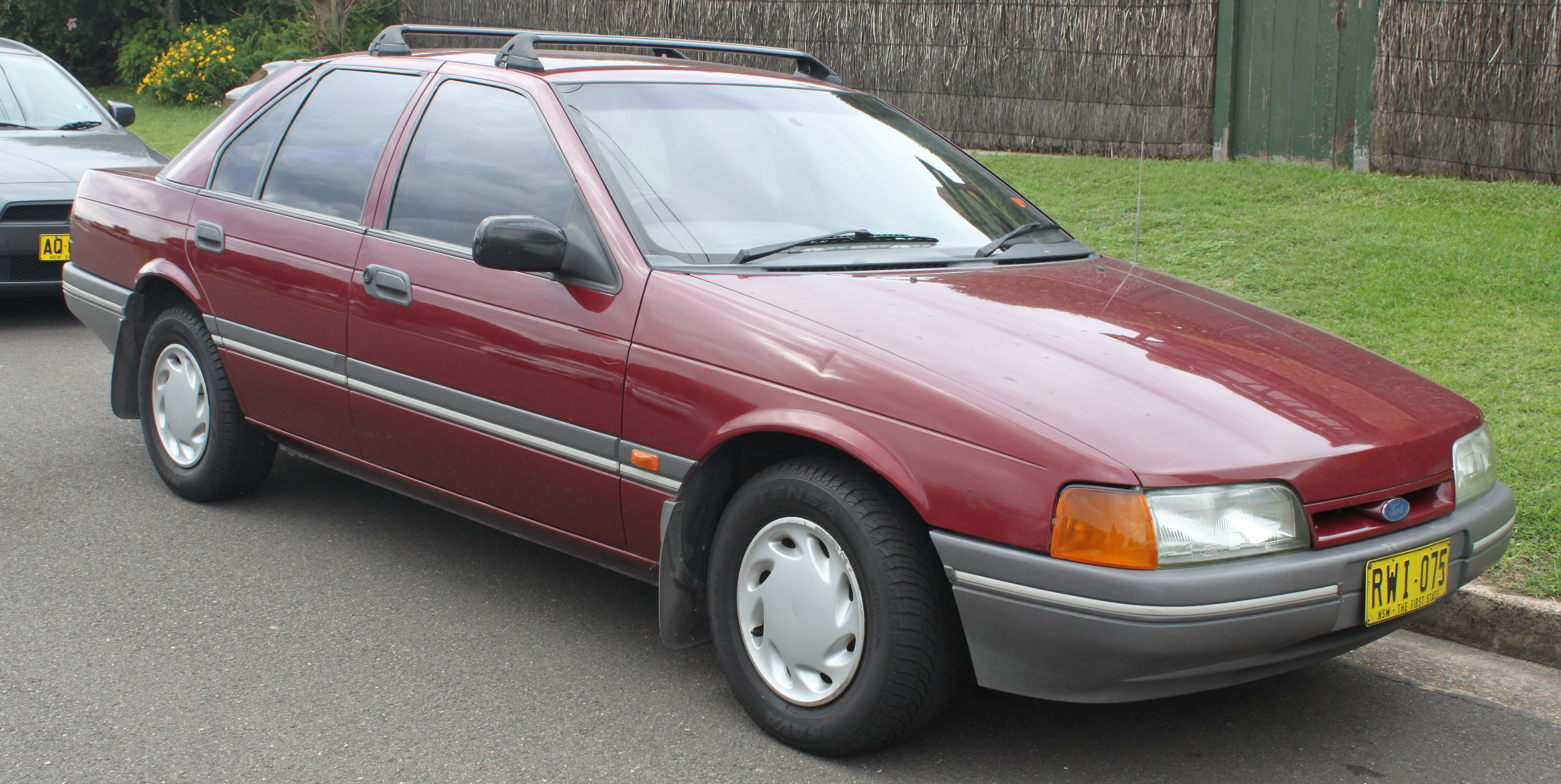
Falcon GL sedan

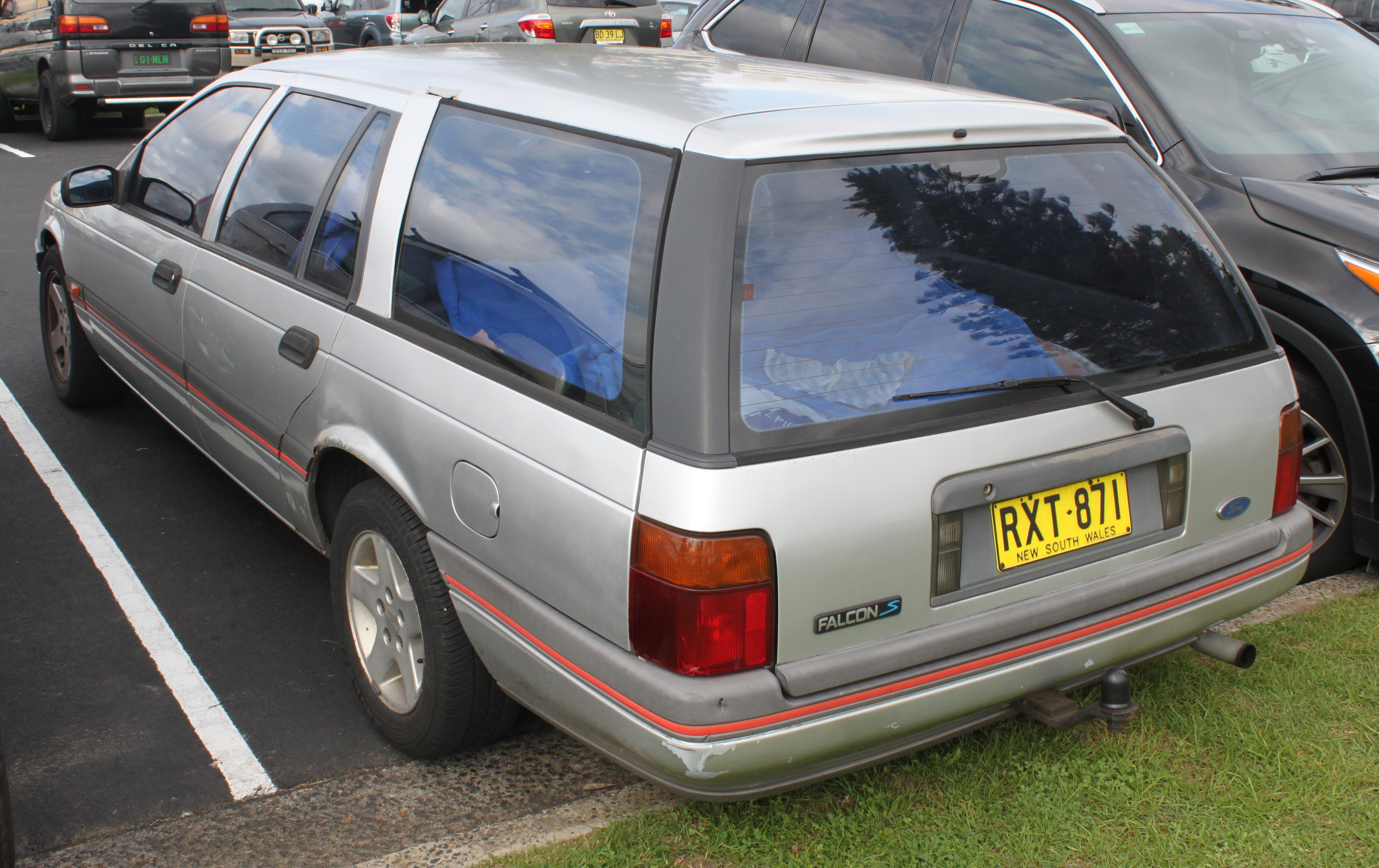
Falcon S wagon

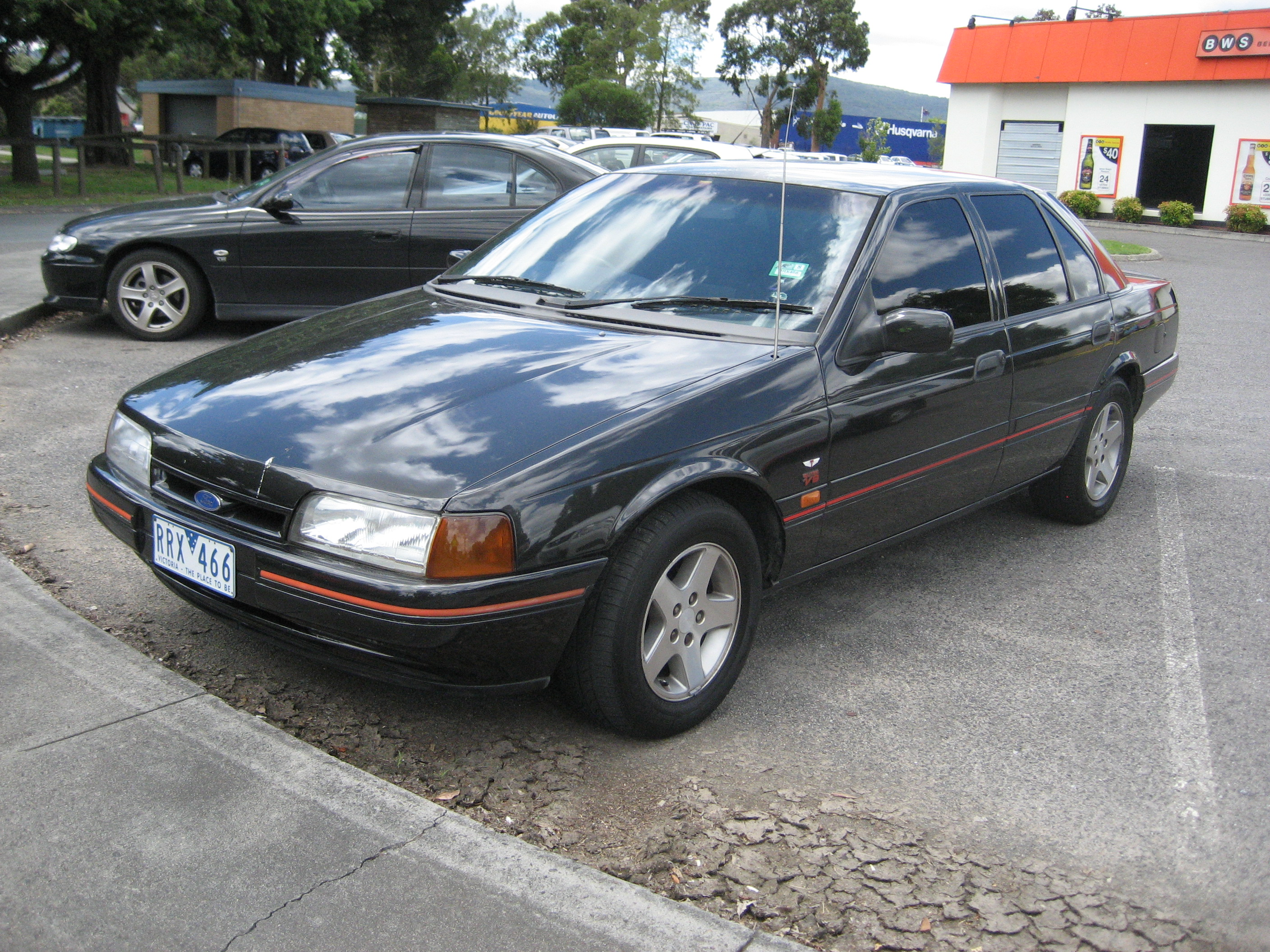
Falcon S XR8 sedan

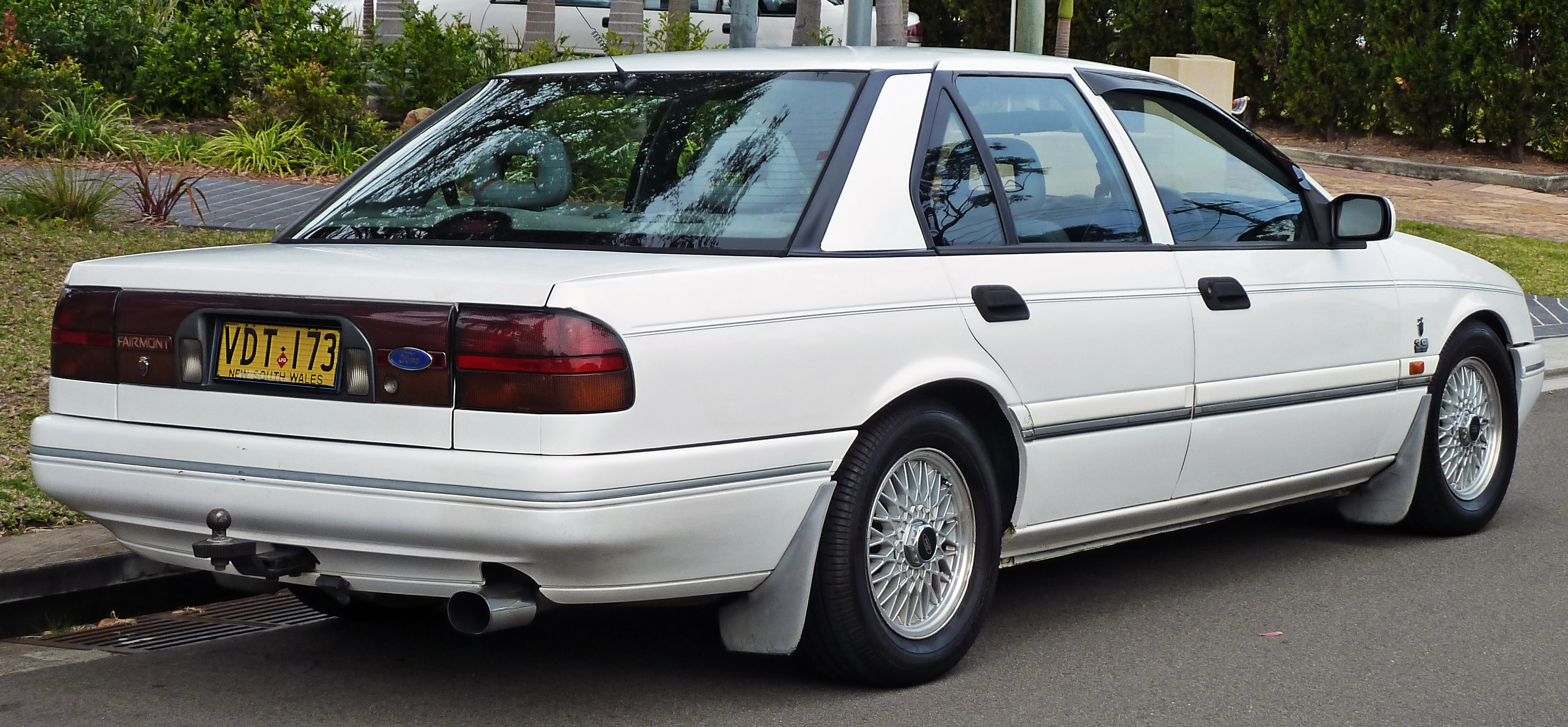
Fairmont Ghia sedan

=== Series II ===
The revised Series II (EB II) model, which arrived in April 1992, had the six-cylinder engine upsized by 35 cm^{3} (from 3949 to 3984 cm^{3}). This brought the nominal total swept capacity to 4.0 litres. The automatic transmission was updated to the M91LE specification, and the electronics were also improved, and the styling was tweaked. The base model now had body-coloured bumpers, and the previously matte black plastic exterior door handles were now given a glossy finish. The update reportedly cost A$1 million.

Innovation became an evident strength in the EB II: anti-lock brakes became an option, a Falcon first, and in 1993, a lap sash centre rear seatbelt became standard. The EB also introduced the "Smartlock" security locking system. South Australian Police revealed the operational success of "Smartlock" by inviting four professional car thieves to steal either a Holden Calais (VN) or an EB specified with the locking system. The successful theft of the motor vehicle meant the thief could keep the vehicle indefinitely. The thieves made off with the VN in under 60 seconds, but gave up on the EB after four days' efforts. Therefore, the EB was classified unstealable. Foam-filled A pillars also featured, which greatly increased crush protection and stiffened the frame, thus helping to reduce noise, vibration, and harshness.

The rarest model was the SS, with just 10 produced. The EB II SS was built to be successful under Group 3E Series Production Cars, five were absorbed immediately into production car racing. The forthcoming Tickford-enhanced S XR6 replaced the role of the SS.

Production of the EB Falcon range totalled 36,374 with 84,847 examples of the EB II being produced. The EB II was replaced by the Ford Falcon (ED) in August 1993.

The EB II was the last Falcon to be assembled at the Wiri plant in New Zealand, the ED and onwards series being imported fully built up from Australia.

Note: GLi and Fairmont were available with either the 4.0-litre I6 or 5.0-litre V8.S XR6 were only available with 4.0-litre, and the S XR8 offered the 5.0-litre V8.S pack wagon were available with 4.0 litre I6 and 5.0-litre V8.

- GLi
- S
- S XR6
- S XR8
- Fairmont
- Fairmont Ghia
- GT
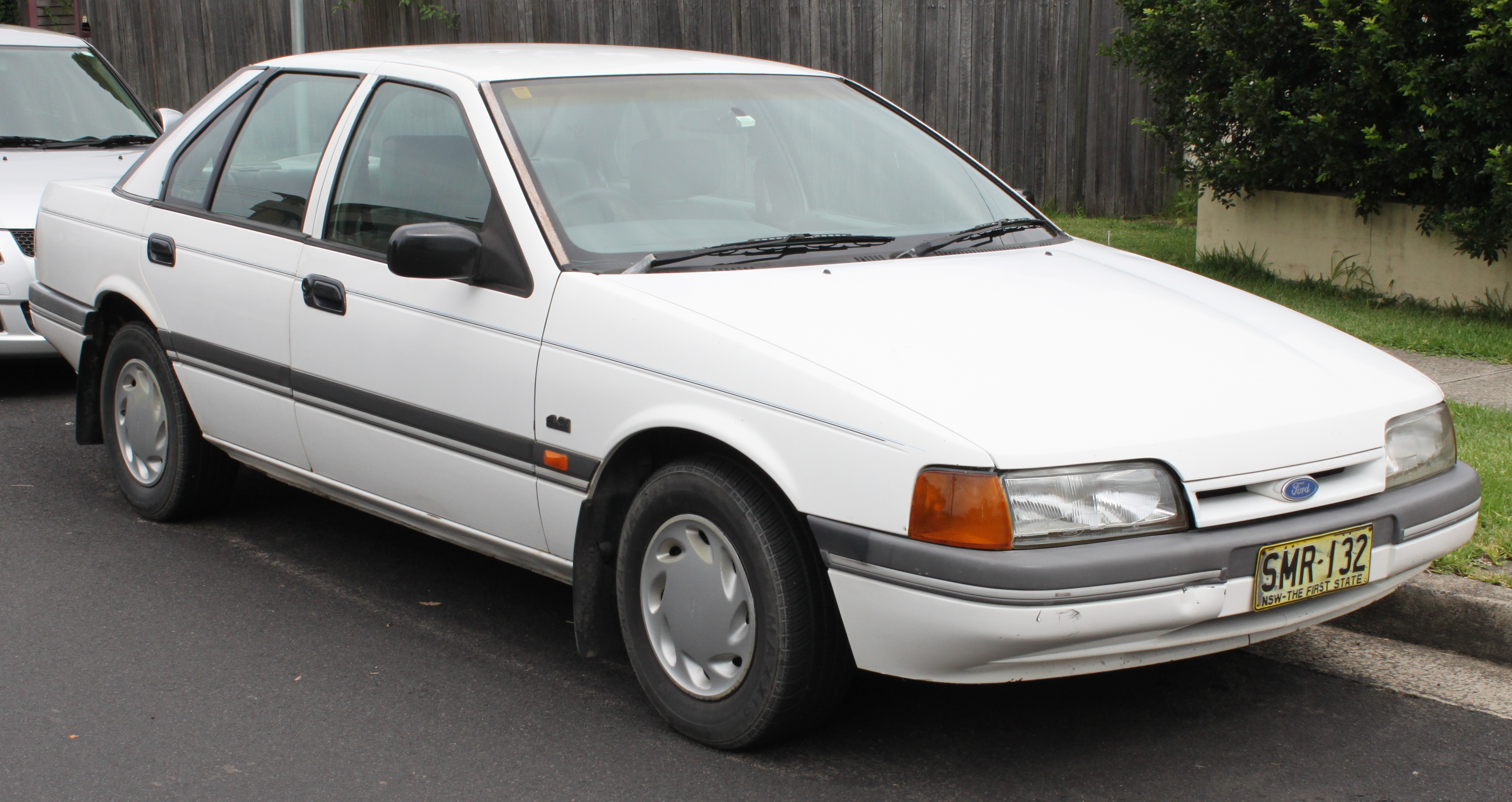
EB II Falcon GLi sedan

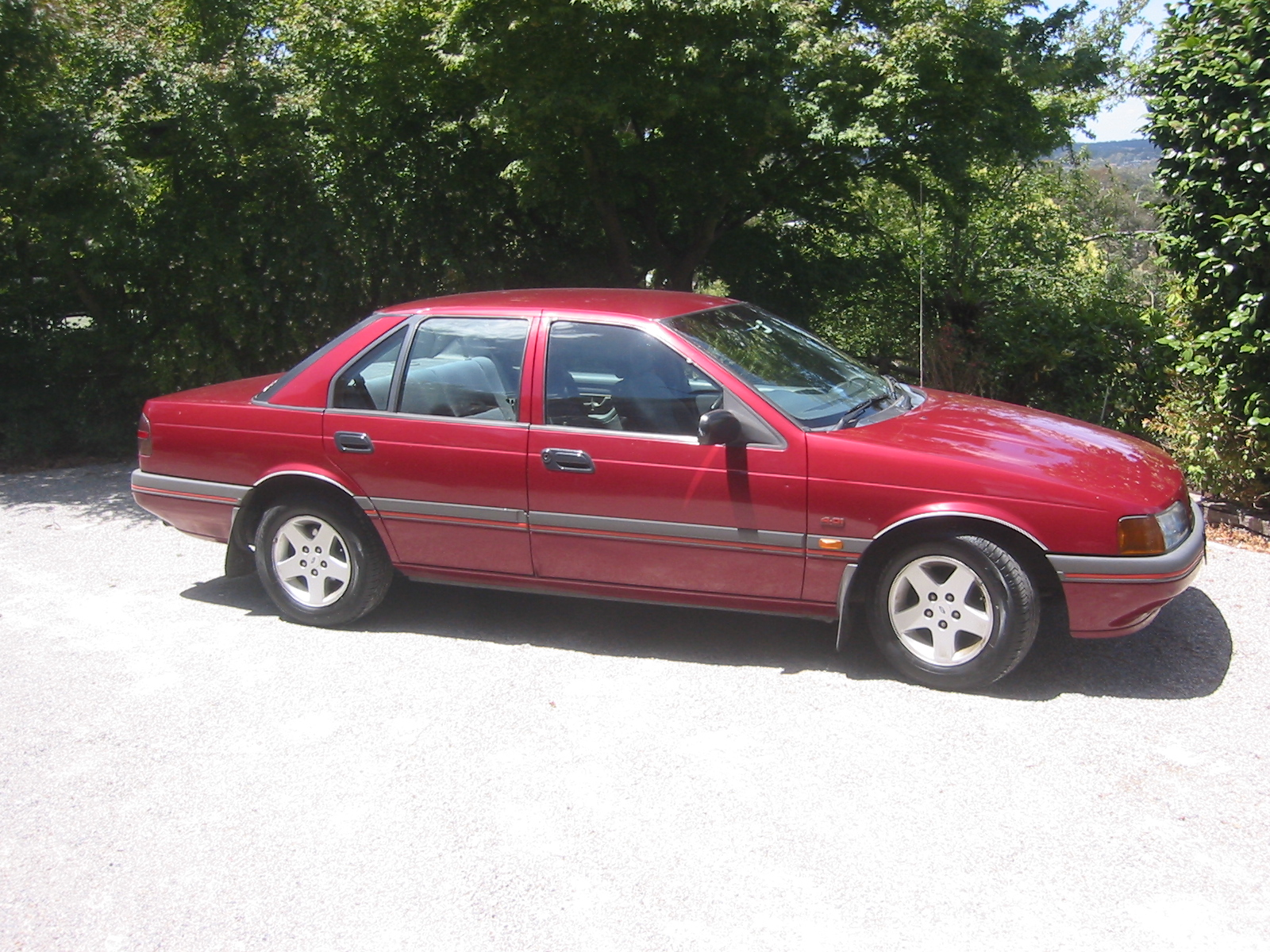
EB II Falcon S XR6 sedan

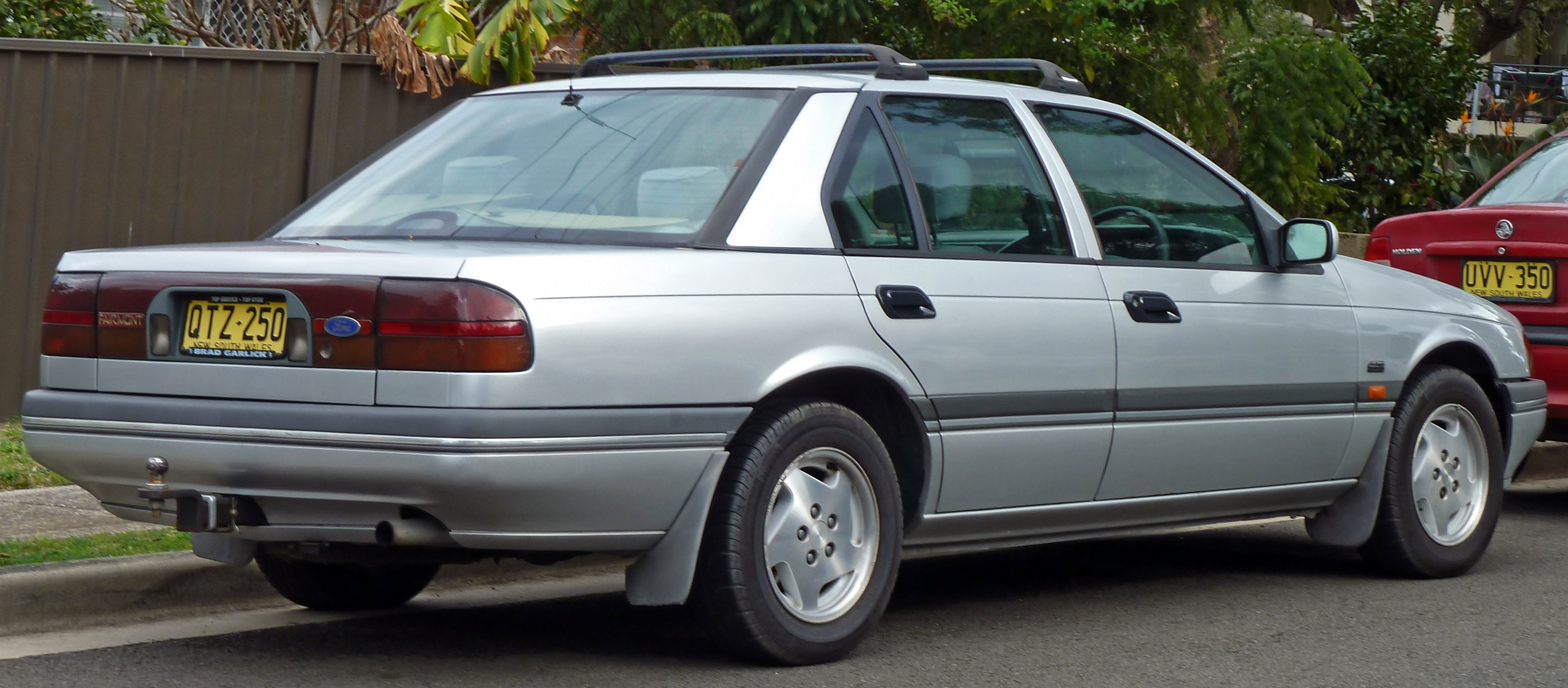
EB II Fairmont sedan

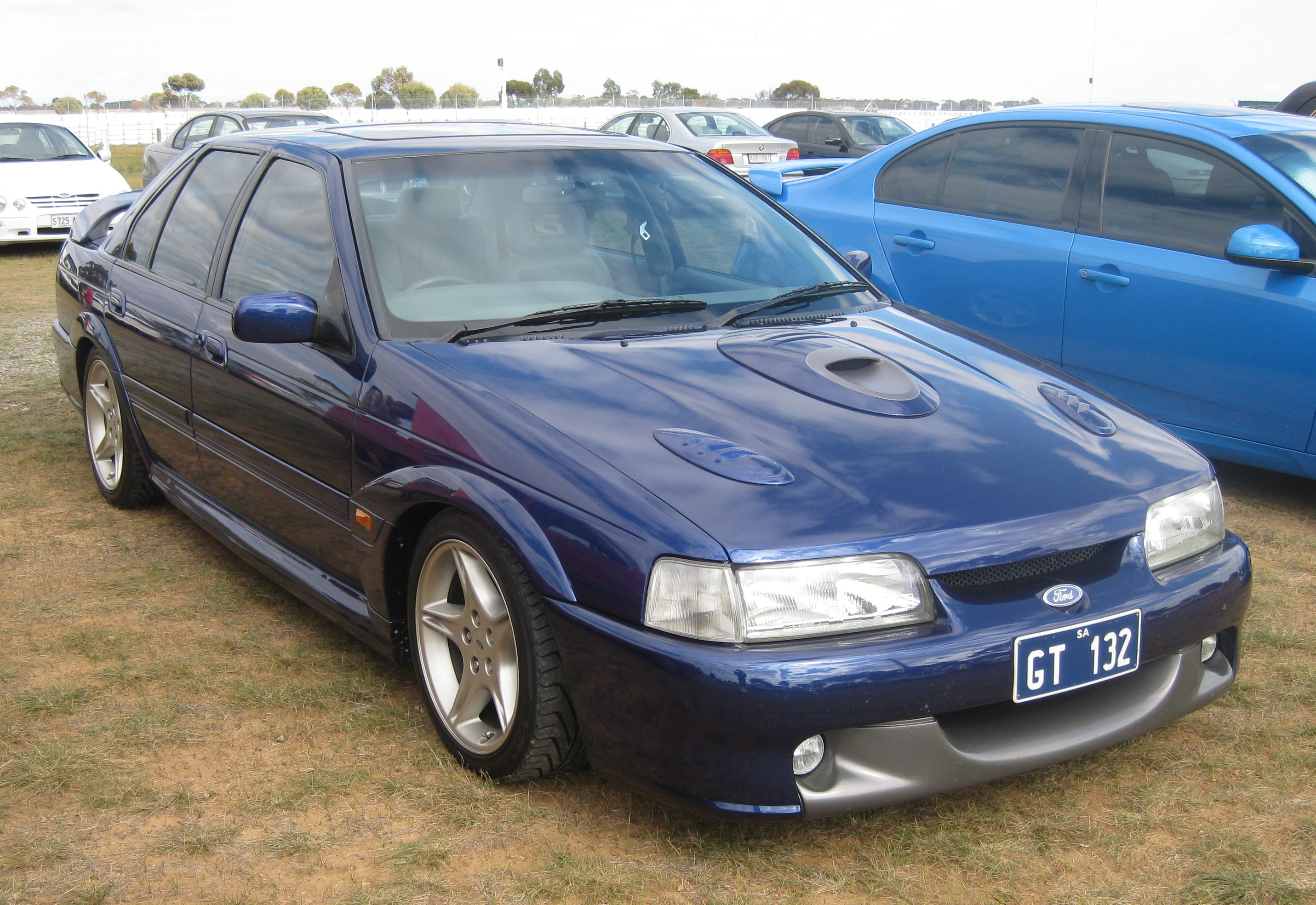
EB II Falcon GT sedan

==== XR and GT by Tickford ====
The EB Series II had the first models from the joint venture between Ford and Tickford Vehicle Engineering. A new model was introduced, the S XR6, featuring Tickford enhancements to the engine and suspension. Similarly, the S XR8 was improved over the existing Series I S XR8. TVE reintroduced the sports orientated 25th anniversary EB Falcon GT specification level, an exclusive 250-unit run celebrating the 25th anniversary of the first original Falcon GT.

== Motorsport ==
The Falcon (EB) SS was raced in the 1993 Australian Production Car Championship, with Mal Rose claiming a championship win, after finishing first four times in six rounds.

Marking the return of the Falcon to top-level touring car racing for the first time since 1984, the Group A 5.0-litre touring car specification EB Falcon had impressive success in the 1993 Australian Touring Car Championship. This was the first season run under the new Group 3A rules, with the EB winning seven of nine rounds. Glenn Seton Racing carried the bulk of success, with drivers Glenn Seton and 1980 World Drivers Champion Alan Jones finishing first and second, respectively. The Dick Johnson Racing Falcons driven by John Bowe and Dick Johnson managed to score third and fifth.

The Seton team's second EB Falcon driven by Geoff Brabham and David Parsons won the 1993 Sandown 500 (the first Falcon to win the Sandown endurance race since Allan Moffat in an XB Falcon GT hardtop in 1974), though a mid-year aerodynamic package given to the Holden Commodore (VP)'s made the Falcons not as competitive at Bathurst. The Falcon received its own upgrade in 1994 with the addition of small wings on the side of the front air dam, which brought it back into contention. This allowed the DJR Falcon driven by Dick Johnson and John Bowe to win both the 1994 Sandown 500 and the 1994 Tooheys 1000 at Bathurst. This was the Falcon's first Bathurst win since Johnson and John French won the crash-shortened 1981 race in an XD Falcon and the Falcon's 9th Phillip Island/Bathurst win overall.

== See also ==
- Ford Falcon (XF) – this utility pickup and panel van of the Falcon line ran concurrently with the EB series of sedans and wagons.
