= Perkins Engineering =

Defunct Australian V8 supercar racing team

- Team Principal: Larry Perkins
- Debut: 1986
- Final Season: 2008
- Round wins: 13
- Pole positions: 6
- 2008 position: 9th (3283 pts)

Perkins Engineering was a team contesting the Australian V8 Supercar Championship Series, operating as an active racing team between 1986 and 2008. From 2009 onwards, the involvement of Perkins Engineering in the championship was wound back into a supply relationship with the newly formed Kelly Racing.

== Team history ==
At the end of 1988, Perkins and Hulme went on to stage a one-two victory in the Group A support race at the 1988 Australian Grand Prix in Adelaide in November. After the leading Dick Johnson Racing Sierras of Johnson and John Bowe suffered fuel pick-up problems, Perkins and Hulme had a fairly comfortable second half of the race.

=== 1990s ===
The Moffat/ANZ rumors did not come to fruition, and the team built a new plain white VL Commodore SS Group A SV for the 1990 season. Aside from some minor sponsorship from longtime supporters such as Castrol, the car's main "sponsor" was "Perkins Engineering", and it ran the entire 1990 season this way. A few other minor sponsors were picked up for the endurance races, where Tomas Mezera co-drove. After a good showing at the 1990 Sandown 500, the pair pulled off a third-place finish at Bathurst after narrowly missing the win after a safety-car mix-up when Perkins was held up in pit lane (the win went to the HRT Commodore of Allan Grice and Win Percy). The pair picked up a win a few weeks later at the newly opened Eastern Creek Raceway in the 1990 Nissan Sydney 500. Perkins showed the speed he was getting out of the now two-year-old model Commodore by qualifying the car second behind the Nissan GT-R and in front of the leading Sierras.

In 1991, Perkins entered a deal that saw Peter Brock close his Mobil 1 Racing team and bring sponsorship to Perkins Engineering to race two VN Commodores. Early results were slim, and despite some mechanical issues, Perkins and Brock generally became the fastest of the Holdens on track during the 1991 Australian Touring Car Championship and into the late season endurance races. While Brock would finish the championship in 6th place, Perkins could only manage 11th. The team's biggest problem was the lack of quality Bridgestone rubber early in the season. The 1991 Bathurst 1000 saw little joy for the team, though both cars easily qualified in the top 10. After a race plagued by electrical issues, the Brock/Andrew Miedecke car finished 7th while the Perkins/Mezera car retired after 65 laps with no oil pressure. Perkins would later attribute his personal lack of success in 1991 to the contract with Brock's team and sponsor Mobil, claiming that the contract actually prevented him from finishing in front of Brock on the race track.

At the end of 1991, Brock and Perkins decided to go their separate way which saw the two VN Commodores sold to Brock's Advantage Racing. Perkins Engineering was again left without a sponsor, so the plain-white 1990 VL Commodore returned – (albeit painted red, after having been leased to Sydney-based veteran Graham Moore in 1991) – once again, with "Perkins Engineering" as the initial primary sponsor. A number of other sponsors became the "main" sponsor periodically during the season. In NSW-based events, the car was known as the "Statewide Roads Commodore", and in Western Australia, and South Australia, it was the "Kreepy Krauly Commodore". Everywhere else, it was again "Perkins Engineering" on the car.

However, for the endurance races and the Australian Grand Prix support races, Perkins Engineering picked up significant sponsorship from Bob Jane T-Marts, and the car was painted yellow and blue, the colors of the T-Marts. Driving with Steve Harrington, Perkins proved there was life in the older model VL Commodore which won first time out in Bob Jane colors at the 1992 Don't Drink Drive Sandown 500 after a late race battle with the BMW M3 Evolution of Tony Longhurst and Paul Morris. Perkins then sensationally put the Commodore onto the front row for the 1992 Tooheys 1000 at Bathurst, but alternator and tire problems in the rainstorms that marred the race (and eventually caused its early finish) saw them eventually finish in 9th place. While driving the older VL, Perkins also pointed out during the top ten runoff at Bathurst that the only 'old' thing about the car was its superseded body shape. The speed of the Perkins VL at Bathurst raised questions about the legality of the car, though Perkins' qualifying time of 2:14.08 was only 0.74 seconds faster than he had qualified in 1990. Also, in that same time period other cars such as the Sierras and the 4WD, twin-turbo Nissan GTR had also improved their own lap times at Bathurst by around 2–3 seconds per lap.

Castrol, a long-time ancillary supporter of Perkins Engineering, came on board in 1993 as major sponsor, flushing the team with more funding than it was used to and rivalling the Mobil dollars of 1991. The team were still in the midst of building a new Holden VP Commodore for the season, so the old 1990 car was once again repainted, this time into the corporate colors of Castrol.

With the new car making its early debut at the Phillip Island round of the championship, after damaging the VL in a rollover at Symmons Plains Raceway, the team spent most of 1993 developing the VP into a race-winning package. Even after an engine failure at the Sandown 500 the team fronted at Bathurst, full of confidence that the car was fast enough to win. The Perkins Castrol Commodore, with its Holden V8 engine as opposed to the Chevrolets run by the other leading Holden teams, was the fastest in all but one session during practice and qualifying. Perkins then cut a near perfect lap to claim his 2nd pole position in the race (Peter Brock set the pole time in 1983), and won after a race long battle with Jim Richards and Mark Skaife. Former motorcycle racer and longtime Allan Moffat co-driver Gregg Hansford had joined to team to co-drive at Sandown and Bathurst.

After the domination of the two Ford teams in the 1993 championship (which despite making up only four of the 14 current-shape models on the grid won the first seven rounds of the championship consecutively) the aerodynamic package for both the EB Falcon and VP Commodore was re-homologated for the 1994 season. Although this allowed Mark Skaife to win the championship, it is possible that by increasing the amount of downforce and drag on the Commodore over Falcon relative to the year prior, that the 1994 specification VP was less suited to the endurance races at Sandown and Bathurst. Both races were won by Dick Johnson and John Bowe in their Shell Falcon while Perkins and Hansford finished in third position as the second placed Holden on both occasions.

Preparing for 1995 with a new Holden VR Commodore, Perkins Engineering had been asked by Castrol to increase its presence to two cars. Perkins resisted saying he wasn't ready to expand the team. Had the team expanded at this point it would be almost certain that Gregg Hansford would have driven the second car. Hansford, who had matched Perkins lap times in the 1994 Tooheys 1000 where the pair finished 3rd, had driven the 1994 car in the season-opening Winfield Triple Challenge, and Greg Crick drove the car at Sandown, with a view to purchasing the car, but this was all the team was prepared to do at that stage.

A few weeks later, Hansford was killed in a Super Touring race at Phillip Island and the team was left without its preferred endurance race co-driver. Perkins himself was said to be devastated at Hansford's death.

Eventually, then England-based Australian, Russell Ingall was chosen to fill the vacant endurance seat. After a forgettable Sandown 500, Perkins and Ingall won the 1995 Tooheys 1000 after being in last place after one lap following a flat tyre off the start line when Perkins and the HRT car of Craig Lowndes touched which ripped the valve out causing the tire to instantly deflate. The car then went a lap down after 50 laps. The pair charged back to the front to take the lead with nine laps remaining, helped by safety cars periods and also by the race leader Glenn Seton blowing the engine of his Falcon on lap 152 while holding a 10-second lead over Perkins.

In 1996 Castrol employed John Clarke who came with many ideas on how to build the Castrol team. His intuition to pick a moment in time to build the Castrol racing team and the Castrol Cougars for women racers was a head of its time. In 1997 John made a pact with Larry Perkins. Perkins role was to beat Brock in his retirement year. Larry and Russell did it. With increased money from Castrol and John Clarke who encouraged associated sponsors to get on board, Perkins Engineering finally expanded to two cars. Peter was a great supporter of the Cougars. For the record they came 13th in two Bathurst 1000 assaults.

After finishing sixth at Bathurst in an older VP Commodore, an experiment to work around the convoluted aerodynamic rules of the time, the team prepared itself for an all-out assault on the 1997 championship.

The 1997 season turned out to be one of the best for the team from a championship perspective with Ingall finishing second and Perkins fourth. They dominated the Melbourne Grand Prix support races and the Phillip Island races with one-two results before once again winning the Bathurst 1000 for Larry's sixth and Ingall's second time. The team also ran a third car as part of the "Castrol Cougars", shared between female drivers Kerryn Brewer and Melinda Price, who is the sister of former racer, Drew Price, and the aunt of future Perkins Engineering driver, Shane Price.

1998 saw the team initially starting in a pair of VS Commodores, as well as fielding the Castrol Cougars entry at selected races throughout the season with Brewer and Price sharing the seat. Ingall, along with HRT's Craig Lowndes, established themselves as the drivers to beat. Perkins debuted a new VT Commodore mid-season before handing it over to Ingall for the remainder of the season. The championship went right down to the final round, however a bad start by Ingall after tangling with Tony Longhurst saw him lose too many points to Lowndes, and second place in the championship was all that could be salvaged.

Perkins and Ingall then went on to win the Tickford 500 at Sandown before eventually finishing second to the Stone Brothers Racing EL Falcon of Jason Bright and Steven Richards at the FAI 1000 at Bathurst.

Future dual Supercars championship winner Marcos Ambrose tested for Perkins Engineering in 1999 but was not employed as his wage demands were more than Perkins was prepared to meet for someone who at that time was relatively unknown.

1999 saw Perkins Engineering end the Castrol Cougars program and enter into a relationship with Wayne Gardner to prepare and run a Coca-Cola sponsored Commodore for selected races during the year. This meant the team had three cars to look after at the workshop and at the race meetings giving them more engineering data than they could get from two cars. Gardner had run his own team (Wayne Gardner Racing) previously but with reduced Coca-Cola money did not have the resources to run it himself any more or even attend a full season.

=== 2000s ===
The 2000 season saw more expansion for the team. Previously, although running two cars in the championship, the endurance races were now included in the championship – (they weren't previously), so the team needed to run both cars at the endurance races, whereas they had previously run only one. Christian Murchison and Luke Youlden ran the No. 8 car in the endurance races. Perkins and Ingall finished 11th at Bathurst.

The deal with Wayne Gardner completed, Perkins Engineering again ran two cars for Larry Perkins and Russell Ingall in 2001. The team finished 8th at Bathurst, and 2nd in a controversial finish to the Queensland 500. Adam Macrow and Luke Youlden drove the No. 8 car in the endurance events.

There were signs at this stage that Larry Perkins was thinking about life outside of the drivers seat, with rumour's at season end that Steven Richards would be moving from Ford Tickford Racing to Perkins Engineering, to replace Larry in the driving seat of the No. 11 car.

While this rumour proved to be true, nobody expected that in doing so, the team would expand once again to three cars, No. 8 for Ingall, No. 11 for Perkins, and No. 16 for Richards. Perkins and Paul Dumbrell teamed up for the endurance races, with Ingall pairing with Richards finishing second at Bathurst. Perkins and Dumbrell finished fifth.

The end of the season was a time of upheaval for the team, with Russell Ingall leaving the team after eight seasons, moving to Stone Brothers Racing, who ran the rival Ford Falcon product. Ensuring that 2003 would have a completely different flavour for the team, Perkins also announced that he would step down from full-time driving, handing the reins over to Richards and Dumbrell for the season.

Perkins would return for the endurance races, teaming with Richards. Dumbrell teamed with Tomas Mezera, returning to the team for the first time since 1991. Richards and Perkins finished in fourth placed at Bathurst, but not before Larry severely damaged the No. 11 Holden VY Commodore at The Cutting during practice on Saturday morning. This caused the car to miss the Top Ten Shootout, for which Richards had qualified. Dumbrell and Mezera finished in 14th.

This accident at Bathurst prompted Larry to completely retire from driving, allowing him to now focus on the management and engineering side of the team.

For 2004, Richards and Dumbrell remained with the team, however an arrangement with Rod Nash Racing saw Tony Longhurst arrive at Perkins Engineering, in a third Castrol sponsored Commodore, but running under Nash's franchise. Longhurst ran as No. 7 in a new Holden VY Commodore, alongside a new No. 11 VY for Richards. Dumbrell started in an old Holden VX Commodore from 2003.

Perkins Engineering also ran the No. 75 Paul Little Racing customer car for Anthony Tratt. Perkins Engineering now had access to data from four cars simultaneously.

Longhurst badly crashed the No. 7 car at the Clipsal 500 on a cool down lap during practice, something Larry described as "dumb" for an experienced driver. Longhurst was demoted to the VX and Dumbrell promoted into the VY for the rest of the series.

Come the endurance races, Steven Richards teamed up with his father, six-time Bathurst winner Jim Richards in the No. 11 VY, and Dumbrell and Longhurst were teamed in the No. 8 VY. Jamie Whincup and Alex Davison were drafted in to drive the No. 7 VX, finishing in ninth place. Dumbrell and Longhurst failed to finish. Tratt teamed up with Tomas Mezera to finish 18th.

Steven and Jim finished the race in 21st position, 13 laps behind, after having to stop for repairs after striking a kangaroo on the lead in to The Cutting at about two-thirds race distance.

For 2005, the team was again fielded four cars, running a pair of Holden VY Commodores for Richards (#11) and Dumbrell (#24). Matthew Coleman and Christian D'Agostin were drafted in for the endurance races.

The Rod Nash Racing and Paul Little Racing relationships continued, with Alex Davison driving the Autobarn sponsored car, with No. 7 on the side. Dumbrell raced this car in the Shanghai & Perth events, as a franchise sale and purchase between seasons left Perkins Engineering with a franchise that did not qualify the No. 24 car for the offshore events.

Neither Castrol car finished at Bathurst, the first time since 1988 at least one Perkins car had failed to finish. Dumbrell had hit the wall just after he had taken over the car from Richards who started the race, when apparent suspension damage caused him to strike the tyres at Griffin's Bend. Returning to the pits, the team found nothing more than cosmetic damage, but upon returning to the circuit, the front left wheel came loose, throwing the car against the outside wall at Griffin's Bend, and then across to the other side of the circuit against the wall.

Unfortunately, the wheel came away from the car, and smashed through the windscreen of Craig Lowndes car. Neither Dumbrell or Lowndes were injured, but the same could not be said for Lowndes' car, which suffered a caved in roof and windscreen. The car continued in the race, minus the front and rear windscreens, and after some hasty panel work.

Late in the season, Richards and Dumbrell swapped numbers, with Richards using No. 24, and Dumbrell No. 11 in order to try and lift the No. 24 franchise up the point standing.

During 2005, longtime sponsor Castrol announced they would not be renewing their sponsorship. Spirit maker Jack Daniels replaced Castrol. Though not the team's best season, 2006 saw both Dumbrell and Richards score various high finishes, with Richards winning the Western Australian round for the second time as in many years. The 2006 season also saw the team run its first full-time program in the Fujitsu Series, with Jack Perkins and Shane Price driving, finishing third and second respectively in the championship.

Perkins Engineering ran a pair of Holden VZ Commodores for 2006, again for Richards (now in #7) and Dumbrell (#11).

Richards and Dumbrell again teamed up for Bathurst, finishing fifth in the No. 7 Jack Daniel's Commodore, while Jack Perkins and Shane Price shared the No. 11 car into a DNF, after Perkins, who had started the race, heavily shunted a disabled Mark Skaife over the crest of the hill in Mountain Straight. Even though it was not his fault, Perkins later apologized to Skaife.

At the end of the 2006 season, both Richards and Dumbrell announced that they were leaving the team. Richards moved to Ford Performance Racing, and Dumbrell to Paul Weel Racing. The late blow left the team out of the market for any recognised, top line driver, so Jack Perkins and Shane Price were promoted from the Fujitsu Series, to run in the main championship.

Price and Perkins, even though they had some good runs on tracks they knew well, ended up with results that were a bit of a letdown overall. Rumours amongst the fans that Jack Daniel's were not pleased with the lack of results, saw both Jack Daniel's and the publicly endorse both drivers as "the future". Mark Skaife briefly tested one of the cars at a Winton test session to help Perkins and Price with the cars ongoing development. Perkins continued to race until just before the Symmons Plains round, having just been diagnosed with Type 1 Diabetes, with Marcus Marshall, who had driven for the team at Sandown and Bathurst, replacing him for the final two rounds of the season.

Upon losing Perkins, the team signed former HRT driver Todd Kelly for the 2008 and 2009 seasons.

== Demise ==
Following a decision by Holden to reduce support for most teams running their Commodore product in the series for 2009, at the end of the 2008 V8 Supercar season, team principal Larry Perkins chose to reduce the level of his involvement in the series. Perkins entered into a business relationship with John and Margaret Kelly whose son Todd drove for the team in 2008, to provide the engineering services for their newly formed Kelly Racing. Many Perkins Engineering staff, equipment and sponsors moved to Kelly Racing including the team's three VE Commodores and Jack Daniels.

The Perkins Engineering franchises were retained by Larry who was the entrant for Kelly Racing's third and fourth cars. As part of the deal Perkins Engineering completed two final VE Commodores for Kelly Racing. Gradually Kelly Racing built up its own engineering base and its dependency on Perkins Engineering reduced. In January 2013 Larry sold his franchises to Kelly Racing and vacated the Moorabbin workshop.

== Racing Number 11 ==
=== Iconic number ===
The racing number 11 has become synonymous with the team, and it has appeared on their racing cars in every season since 1986. It has become as significant in Australian motor sport, as has Peter Brock's number "05" and Dick Johnson's number "17".

Legend has it that Perkins chose the number 11 for his car because "it's really easy to carry spare stickers – I only have to get the printers to make me up a box full of 1's". This simple, no nonsense approach is typical of almost everything that Larry does.

=== Almost Lost ===
At the start of the 2005 season, Perkins Engineering almost lost the use of the racing number 11. At the end of the previous season, Larry sold his two Level 1 racing licences to Craig Gore, and purchased a single Level 2 licence, and leased a second from Bap Romano. Racing numbers are attached to the licences, not the teams who use them, and Gore's WPS Racing was ready to use the No. 11 and No. 8 from the old Perkins-held licences.

Perkins fans were incensed, and many were vocal about the return of No. 11 to its "rightful" home. Perkins, along with then sponsor, Castrol, approached Gore and V8 Supercars Australia to have the numbers returned. While Gore kept No. 8, he allowed the return of No. 11 to Perkins Engineering. The team ran No. 11 and No. 24 (the number associated with the Romano licence), and the fans were appeased.

=== Carrying On Into Future ===
Following the effective closure of the team at the end of 2008, the franchise licences owned by Larry Perkins were leased into the new Kelly Racing team for 2009. His son Jack also took up one of the drives at the new team, using one of the Perkins owned licences, and will continue the family association with racing number No. 11.

=== Other Numbers Used ===
The team has used various other number for second and third cars in the team over the years, details of many of these below:

- 1988 – #10 was used at Sandown, Bathurst and Adelaide, #20, and #40 (spare car) were used at Bathurst only. #11 was not used at Bathurst, but used in all other races.
- 1989 – #7 and #16 were used at Sandown, Bathurst, and Adelaide. #11 used in all other races.
- 1991 – #05 was used when Peter Brock and Perkins Engineering teamed up for Brock's return to Holden. Perkins own car used No. 11 all season.
- 1995 – No. 9 was used by Gregg Hansford at Eastern Creek, and No. 12 by Greg Crick at Sandown and Symmons Plains
- 1996 until 2004 – No. 8 was used by Russell Ingall, and Paul Dumbrell.
- 1997 and 1998 – No. 16 was used by Melinda Price and Kerryn Brewer.
- 1999 – No. 19 was used by Wayne Gardner.
- 2002 – No. 16 was used by Steven Richards.
- 2004 & 2006 – 2008. – No. 7 has been used by Tony Longhurst, Alex Davison, Paul Dumbrell, Steven Richards, Shane Price, and Todd Kelly.
- 2005 – No. 24 was used by Paul Dumbrell and Steven Richards.

== Bathurst Victories ==
Perkins Engineering has won the classic Bathurst 1000 race a total of three times – in 1993, 1995, and 1997. Perkins himself drove in all three victories, co-driving with Gregg Hansford in 1993, and Russell Ingall in 1995, and 1997. Cars built and driven by Perkins also won Bathurst in 1982, 1983, and 1984, while he was employed as chief engineer for the Holden Dealer Team.

=== 1993 – Speed ===
- Larry Perkins/Gregg Hansford, Castrol Commodore VP No. 11

The team's 1993 Bathurst victory was all about speed. The No. 11 Castrol Holden VP Commodore was clearly the fastest car all week, topping every practice and qualifying session, except the first practice session, in which the car placed second. The race was a race in three, between Perkins and Hansford, Mark Skaife and Jim Richards in a Winfield sponsored Commodore, and Tomas Mezera and Win Percy in a Holden Racing Team Commodore. When Percy crashed the No. 15 car after a throttle jammed, the race was a straight fight between Perkins/Hansford and the Skaife/Richards car. The outright speed of the Perkins car saw the team home, despite a late race flurry of rain, which made tyre selection into a lottery.

The speed of the Castrol Commodore surprised many as Perkins chose to run a Holden V8 engine rather than the more powerful Chevrolet V8 used by the other leading Holden teams (Brock, Gibson Motorsport and HRT). Perkins claimed using the Holden engine was purely down to cost against the more expensive Chev as he had many of the well developed Holdens at his team base. He also claimed to get better fuel consumption from the Holden, and with only a small difference in power and a superior set up, he was able to run ahead of all but the Richards/Skaife Winfield Commodore all weekend.

Following his Bathurst win, Perkins was forced by CAMS to race the Chevy V8 the following year.

=== 1995 – Determination ===
- Larry Perkins/Russell Ingall, Castrol Commodore VR No. 11

While not the fastest car all week, the No. 11 Castrol Holden VR Commodore was close to the front in most sessions, and the race looked like being a battle between Wayne Gardner, Craig Lowndes, Glenn Seton and the Perkins car. At the start, a minor collision between Perkins and Lowndes saw the tyre valve from Perkins front right wheel torn off, resulting in the deflation of the tyre, and a slow lap back around to the pits. After replacing the tyre, and checking for other damage, Perkins roared down pit lane, trying to stay on the lead lap, a feat he accomplished.

The car stayed on the lead lap, until a minor safety-car hiccup saw it go down a lap, and seemingly out of race contention. New co-driver Russell Ingall was told by the team to not worry about the car, and just push 110% for the rest of the day – to spare nothing. When the leading Richards/Skaife Commodore retired with a failed diff, Ingall scrambled the car back onto the lead lap. Between them, Perkins and Ingall spent the rest of the race gradually whittling back the gap to the leaders.

Following a late race safety-car intervention, Perkins (who had just returned to the car), found himself in sixth place, and only about 10 seconds behind the leader, Glenn Seton. Following the exit of the safety car, Perkins picked off all the cars ahead of him over the next three laps, with the exception of Seton, who had responded to Larry's charge, and started turning similar lap times. Seton seemed set for victory.

However, with nine laps remaining, the extra strain Seton was putting through his already tiring engine proved to be too much – a broken valve spring forcing the car into retirement, and leaving Perkins in front for his team's second Bathurst crown, and his fifth as a driver.

=== 1997 – Reliability ===
- Larry Perkins/Russell Ingall, Castrol Commodore VS No. 11

Racing cars built by Perkins Engineering have been noted for their reliability. During the 1997 event, the Perkins Engineering car was one of the fastest for much of the week. The Brock/Skaife Holden Racing Team car, the Greg Murphy/Lowndes Holden Racing Team car, the Gardner/Crompton Coca-Cola car, and the Alan Jones/Jason Bright/Scott Pruett Komatsu car were also strong contenders.

However, one by one, these cars fell by the wayside. Craig Lowndes crashed the No. 15 car out at McPhillamy Park, the No. 05 car suffered an engine failure with Skaife at the wheel, Gardner blew an engine at Forrest Elbow, and Jones had a string of mechanical dramas. The only hiccup for the Perkins Engineering car was a run across the dirt by Ingall at the bottom of The Chase, after a fuel surge at the end of his stint, caused the engine to stall.

It was a clear victory for reliability.–

== Driver Roll Call ==
The following is a list of drivers who have competed in Perkins Engineering built/entered vehicles in top-level Touring Car/V8 Supercar events:

- Larry Perkins (1986 to 2003)
- David Parsons (1986 to 1987)
- Denny Hulme (1987 to 1988)
- Jeff Allam (1988) – as part of Holden Special Vehicles team, later known as Holden Racing Team
- Armin Hahne (1988) – as part of Holden Special Vehicles team, later known as Holden Racing Team
- Tom Walkinshaw (1988) – as part of Holden Special Vehicles team, later known as Holden Racing Team
- Andy Wallace (1988) – as part of Holden Special Vehicles team, later known as Holden Racing Team
- Tomas Mezera (1989 to 1991, 2003–2004) – as part of Holden Racing Team / Perkins Engineering arrangement (1989 only)
- Win Percy (1989) – as part of Holden Racing Team / Perkins Engineering arrangement
- Neil Crompton (1989) – as part of Holden Racing Team / Perkins Engineering arrangement
- Steve Harrington (1989, 1992) – as part of Holden Racing Team / Perkins Engineering arrangement (1989 only)
- Peter Brock (1991) – as part of Advantage Racing / Perkins Engineering arrangement
- Andrew Miedecke (1991) – as part of Advantage Racing / Perkins Engineering arrangement
- Gregg Hansford (1993 to 1995)
- Greg Crick (1995) – once off appearance at Sandown ATCC round with view to vehicle purchase
- Russell Ingall (1995 to 2002)
- Melinda Price (1997 and 1998) – "Castrol Cougars" program
- Kerryn Brewer (1997 and 1998) – "Castrol Cougars" program
- Wayne Gardner (1999)
- David Brabham (1999)
- Christian Murchison (2000)
- Luke Youlden (2000 to 2001)
- Adam Macrow (2001)
- Paul Dumbrell (2002 to 2006)
- Steven Richards (2002 to 2006)
- Tony Longhurst (2004)
- Anthony Tratt (2004)
- Jamie Whincup (2004)
- Alex Davison (2004)
- Jim Richards (2004)
- Matthew Coleman (2005)
- Christian D'Agostin (2005)
- Jack Perkins (2006 to 2008)
- Shane Price (2006 to 2008)
- Marcus Marshall (2007)
- Kayne Scott (2007)
- Todd Kelly (2008)
- Nathan Pretty (2008)

== Super2 Drivers ==
- (Australia) Alex Davison (2004)
- (Australia) Shane Price (2006)
- (Australia) Jack Perkins (2006)
