= Glenn Seton Racing =

Australian motor racing team

- Manufacturer: Ford
- Team Principal: Glenn Seton
- Race Drivers: (Australia) Glenn Seton (Australia) Alan Jones (Australia) Neil Crompton
- Chassis: Ford Sierra RS500 (1989-1992); Ford EB Falcon (1992-1994); Ford EF Falcon (1995-1996); Ford EL Falcon (1997-1998); Ford AU Falcon (1999-2002)
- Debut: 1989
- Drivers' Championships: 2 (1993 & 1997)
- Round wins: 17
- Pole positions: 18
- 2002 position: 24th

Glenn Seton Racing was an Australian motor racing team which competed in the V8 Supercars Championship Series between 1989 and 2002.

== History ==
=== Group A ===
At the end of 1988, Philip Morris were dissatisfied with the level of signage it was offered at Nissan Motorsport and thus concluded a deal with Nissan driver Glenn Seton and his engine-builder father Barry to form a team in 1989 with a Ford Sierra RS500. Only one car was raced in the Australian Touring Car Championship with the team expanding to two cars for the Sandown 500 and Bathurst 1000 endurance races each year.

In 1990 the team expanded to running two cars full-time with Drew Price and Seton's former Nissan team mate George Fury driving the second car. Peter Jackson Racing, as the team was known with its sponsorship from Philip Morris, reverted to a single Sierra for 1991, though the second car was again put in use during the endurance races. For 1992, the team again expanded to two cars for the ATCC, one for Seton and the second shared by Wayne Park and David Parsons.

=== Group 3A and V8 Supercars ===
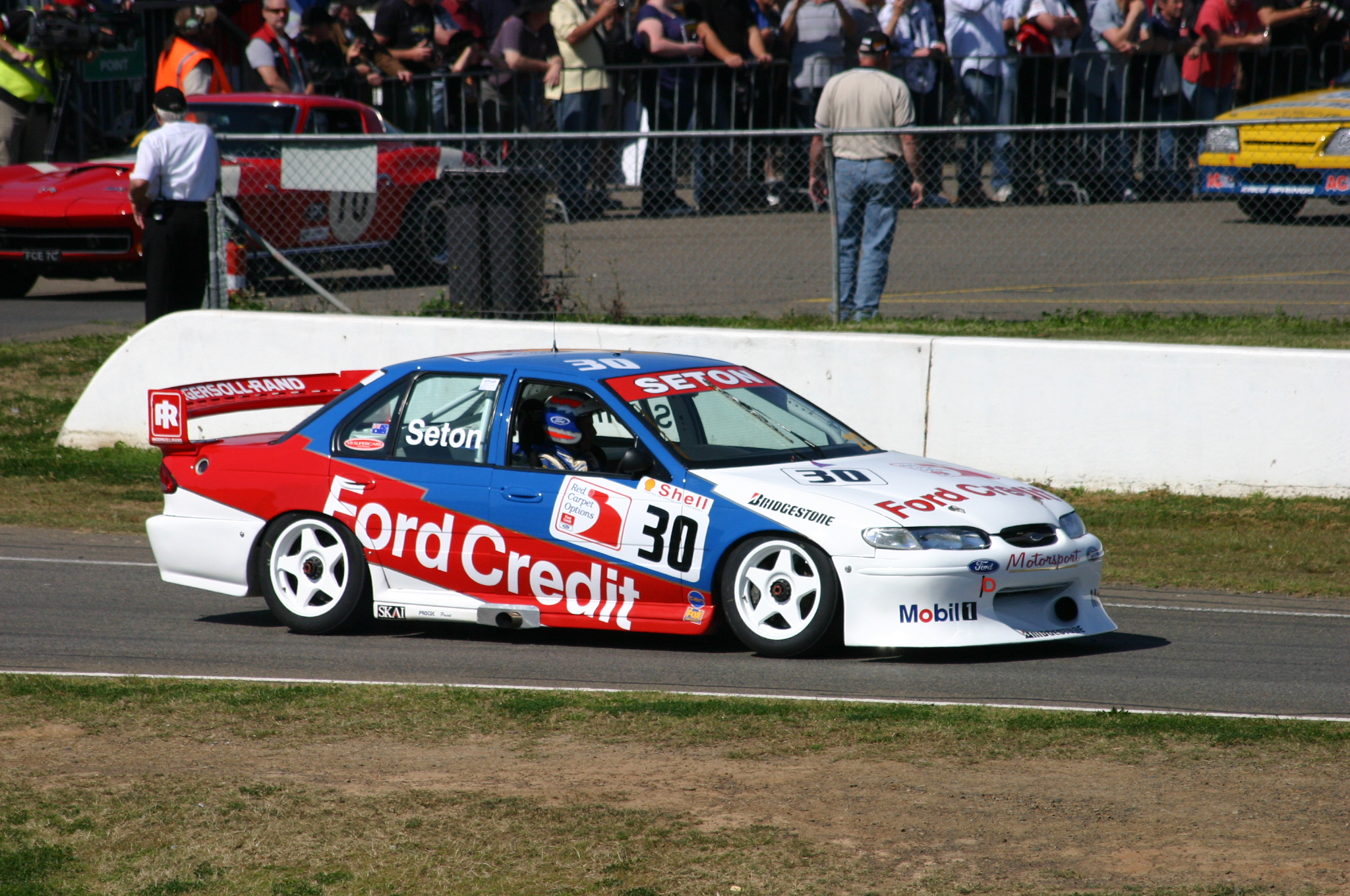
Glenn Seton won the 1997 Australian Touring Car Championship in a Ford EL Falcon

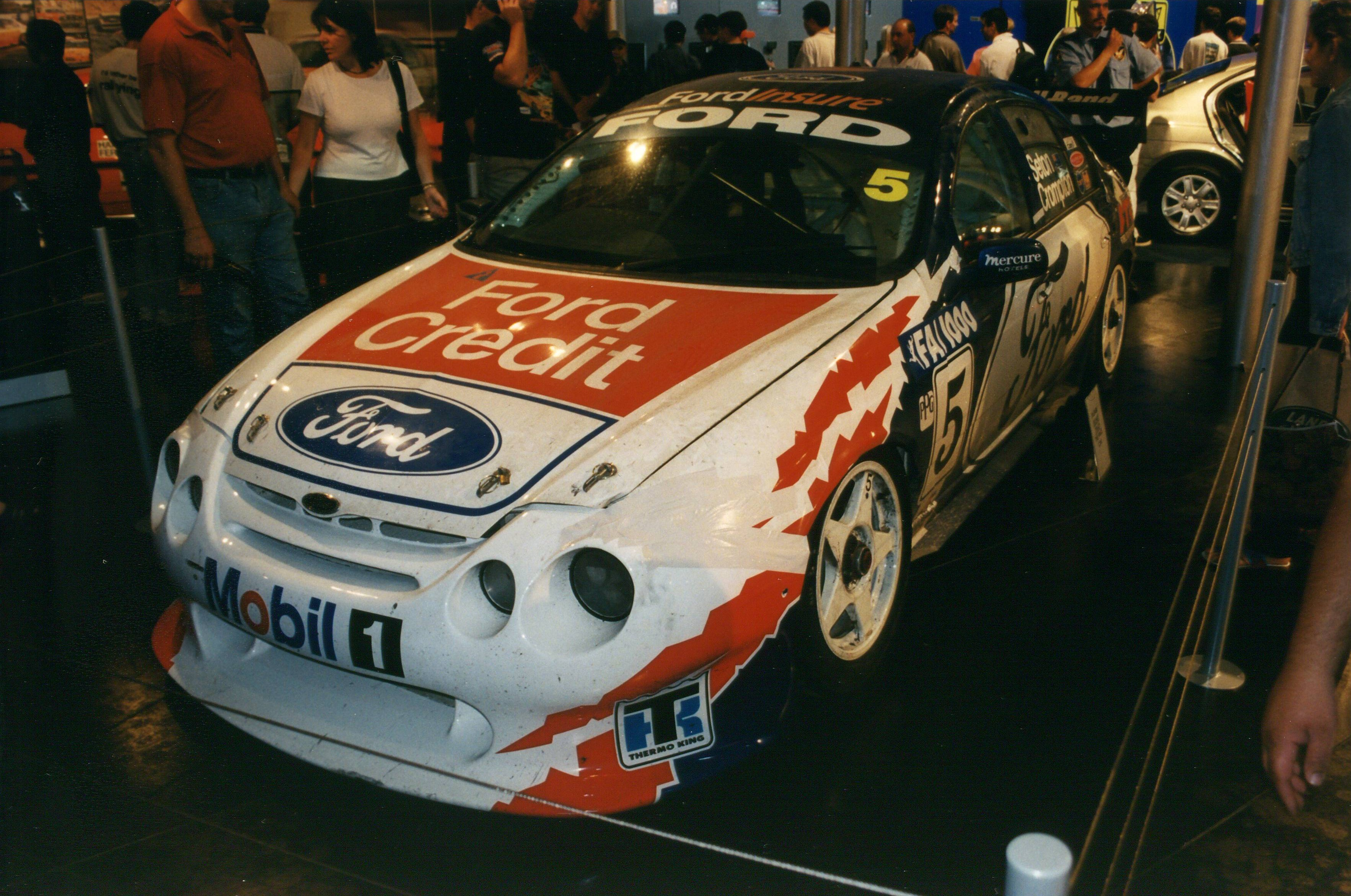
2000 Ford AU Falcon

At the 1992 Sandown 500 the team debuted a Ford EB Falcon with Alan Jones joining as co-driver. Jones would drive the second car from 1993 until 1995.

In 1993 Seton and Jones finished first and second in the championship while David Parsons and Geoff Brabham won the Sandown 500. Between 1992 and 1995, the team also won all four editions of the non-championship Winfield Triple Challenge held at Eastern Creek Raceway - three to Seton and one to Jones.

With tobacco sponsorship being outlawed in 1996, the team scaled back to a single car with Ford Credit sponsorship. Seton won the 1997 championship.

In 1999 with increased sponsorship from Ford and its performance vehicle partner Tickford Vehicle Engineering, the team was rebranded as Ford Tickford Racing, a de facto factory team. The team also expanded to two cars with Neil Crompton driving the second car. In 2001 Crompton was replaced by Steven Richards.

In 2002 with Ford diverting its sponsorship to 00 Motorsport, the team reverted to a one car operation. In December 2002 the team was purchased by Prodrive and became Ford Performance Racing for the 2003 season, with Seton staying on as a driver for the team.

== Major Wins ==
Major race and series wins by Glenn Seton Racing include:

- 1990 Sandown 500 - Glenn Seton & George Fury (Ford Sierra RS500)
- 1990 Australian Endurance Championship - Glenn Seton (Ford Sierra RS500)
- 1993 Australian Touring Car Championship - Glenn Seton (Ford EB Falcon)
- 1993 Sandown 500 - Geoff Brabham & David Parsons (Ford EB Falcon)
- 1997 Australian Touring Car Championship - Glenn Seton (Ford EL Falcon)

== Drivers ==
The following is a list of drivers who have driven for the team in the Australian Touring Car Championship and V8 Supercars Championship Series, in order of their first appearance. It also includes drivers who drove for the team in the Bathurst 1000 before it became a championship event. Drivers who only drove for the team on a part-time basis are listed in italics.

- (Australia) Glenn Seton (1989-2002)
- (Australia) John Goss (1989)
- (Australia) Tony Noske (1989)
- (France) Alain Ferté (1989)
- (Australia) Drew Price (1990)
- (Australia) George Fury (1990)
- (Australia) Gregg Hansford (1991)
- (Australia) Wayne Park (1991)
- (Australia) David Parsons (1991)
- (Australia) Alan Jones (1993-1995)
- (New Zealand) Paul Radisich (1994)
- (Australia) Allan Grice (1995)
- (Australia) Rodney Forbes (1998)
- (Australia) Neil Crompton (1998-2000)
- (Australia) Geoff Brabham (1999)
- (Australia) Neal Bates (1999-2000)
- (Australia) Dean Canto (2000-2001)
- (Australia) Wayne Gardner (2000)
- (New Zealand) Steven Richards (2001)
- (New Zealand) Jim Richards (2001)
- (Australia) Owen Kelly (2002)
- (Australia) David Besnard (2002)
