= Holden Astra =

Compact car from Holden

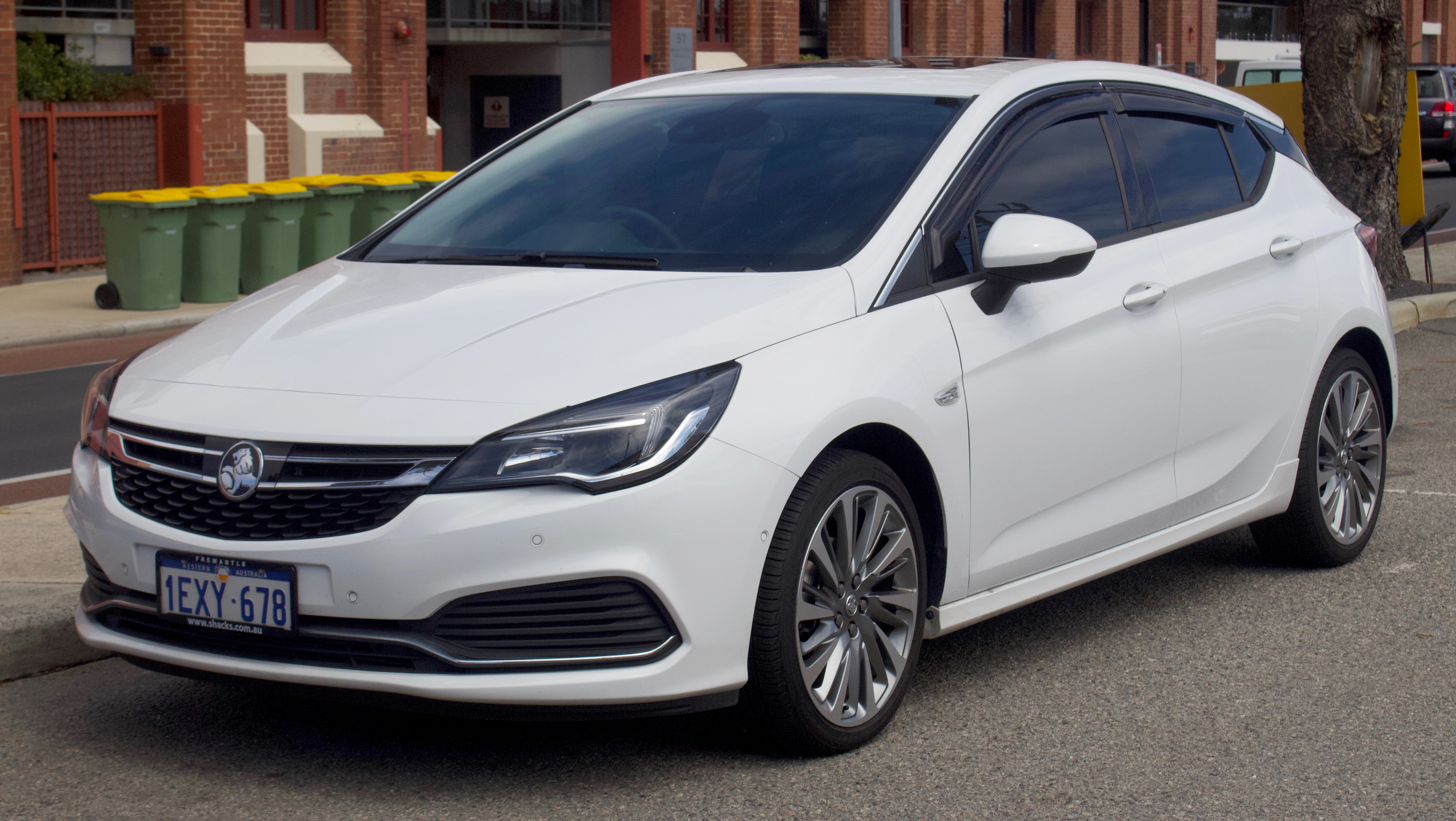

Overview
- Manufacturer: Nissan (1984–1989); Opel (General Motors) (1996–2009, 2015–2017); Opel (Groupe PSA) (2017–2020); GM Korea (2017–2019)
- Production: 1984–1989; 1995–2009; 2015–2020

Chronology
- Successor: Holden Nova (LD), Holden Cruze (AH), Peugeot 308 III (BK)

The Holden Astra is a small car formerly marketed by Holden. The first two generations of Astra were made only for Australia, and was a derivative of the locally produced Nissan Pulsar. With the Button car plan coming into effect, it was replaced by the Holden Nova, a rebadged Toyota Corolla.

In 1995, Holden commenced selling the TR Astra in New Zealand. The TR was a rebadged version of the Opel Astra, which had been sold locally as an Opel since 1993. Holden discontinued the Nova line in Australia in favour of Opel's TR. Following its implementation as an Opel, it quickly became successful in its TS (1998) generation, where it came close to becoming Australia's best selling small car. The AH (2004) continued its success, before Holden discontinued Opel-sourced product range, replacing Astra with GM Daewoo's Cruze.

On 1 May 2014, Holden announced plans to import the Opel Astra J GTC and Opel Astra J OPC with Holden badges into Australia and New Zealand, and the following generation replaced the Cruze officially in 2017. In late 2016 a new Holden Astra range was released comprising rebadged European Vauxhall/Opel Astra hatchbacks, (coded the BK series). This was followed in 2017 by rebadged Chevrolet Cruze sedans (coded BL), and rebadged Vauxhall Astra wagons (coded BK).

== First generation (LB, LC; 1984–1987) ==
First generation (LB, LC)
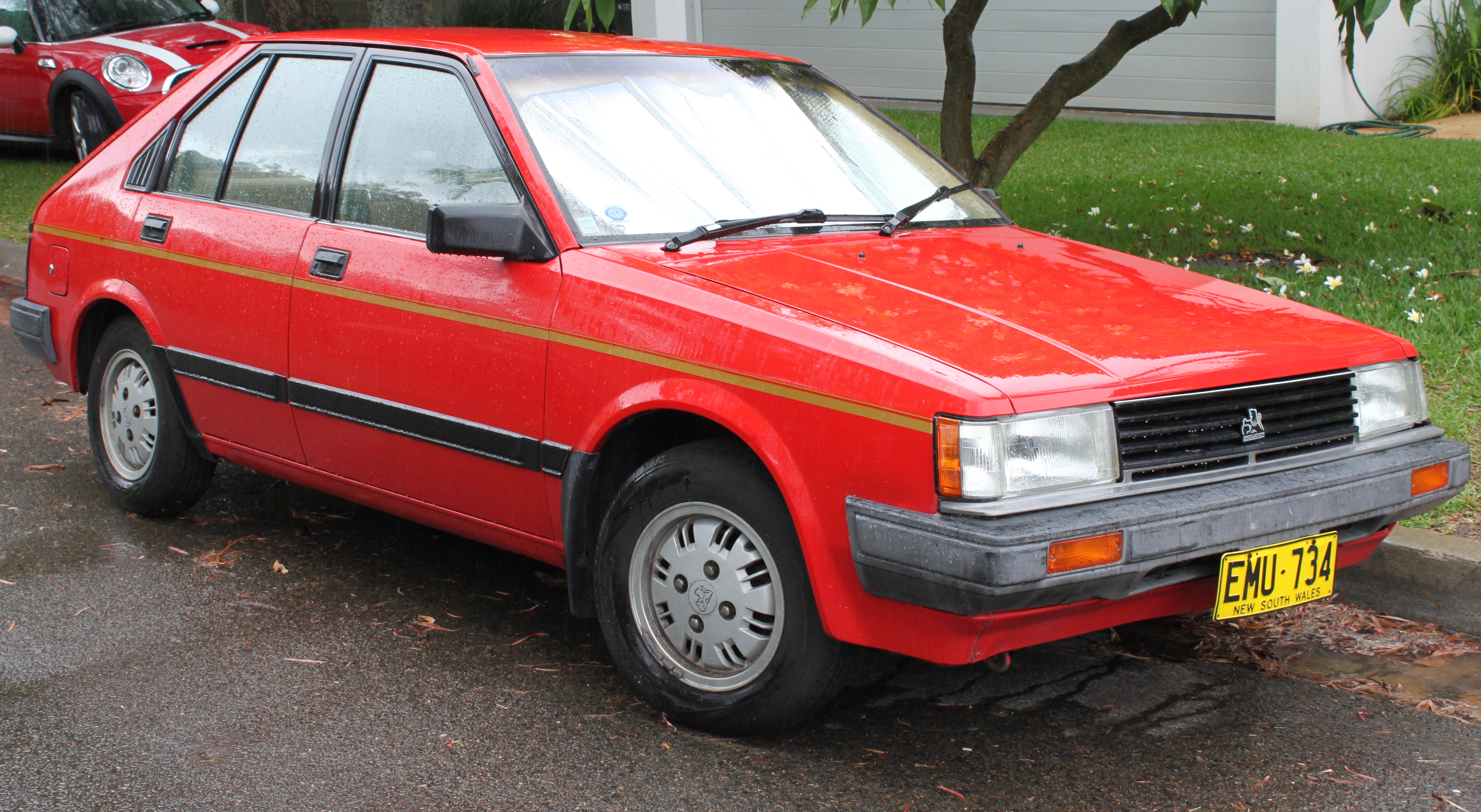
- Astra LB (pre-facelift)

Overview
- Also called: Nissan Pulsar (N12)
- Production: 1984–1987
- Assembly: Australia: Clayton South, Victoria

Body and chassis
- Body style: 5-door hatchback
- Related: Alfa Romeo Arna; Nissan Cherry Europe; Nissan Pulsar Milano

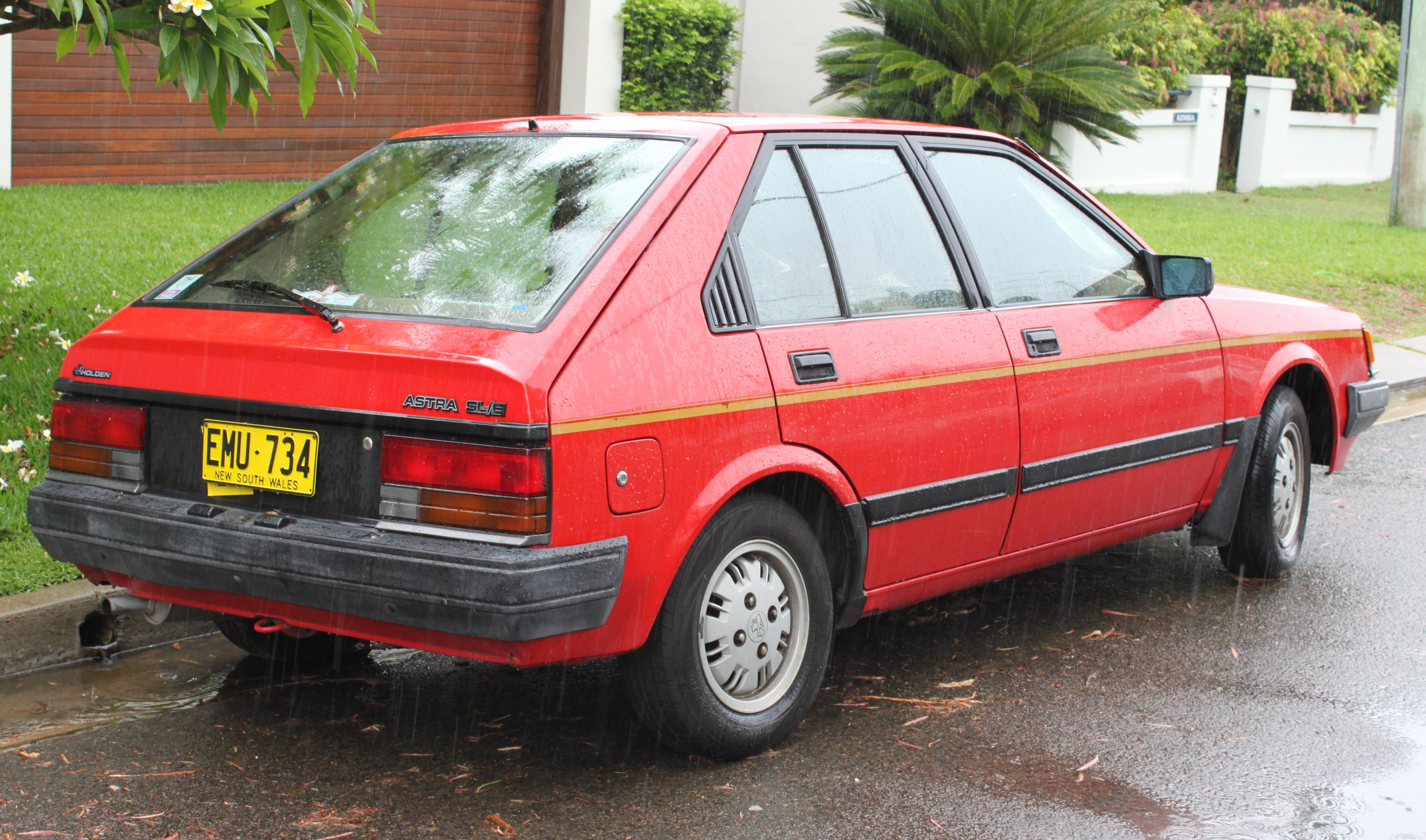
1984–1986 Holden Astra SL/E (LB) (pre-facelift)

The original Holden Astra, introduced in August 1984 as the LB series was a badge engineered Nissan Pulsar (N12). The Pulsar, a Japanese designed model, sold alongside the unique to Australia Astra line-up. The Pulsar for Australia was assembled in Clayton, Victoria; however, for the Astra the body panels were pressed at Holden's Elizabeth, South Australia facility. Unlike its Nissan counterpart, the Astra was only offered as a five-door hatchback, with the three-door hatchback and four-door sedan body styles omitted from the range due to fears they would overlap with Nissan's own Pulsar range. However, Holden's continuation of the Gemini sedan range in 1985 was the nearest equivalent of this in the range.

The only engine available was a Nissan-designed 1.5-litre engine, locally manufactured, this engine produced 52 kilowatts (70 hp) and 115 newton-metres (85 ft⋅lbf) of torque. Transmission options were a five-speed manual or a three-speed automatic.

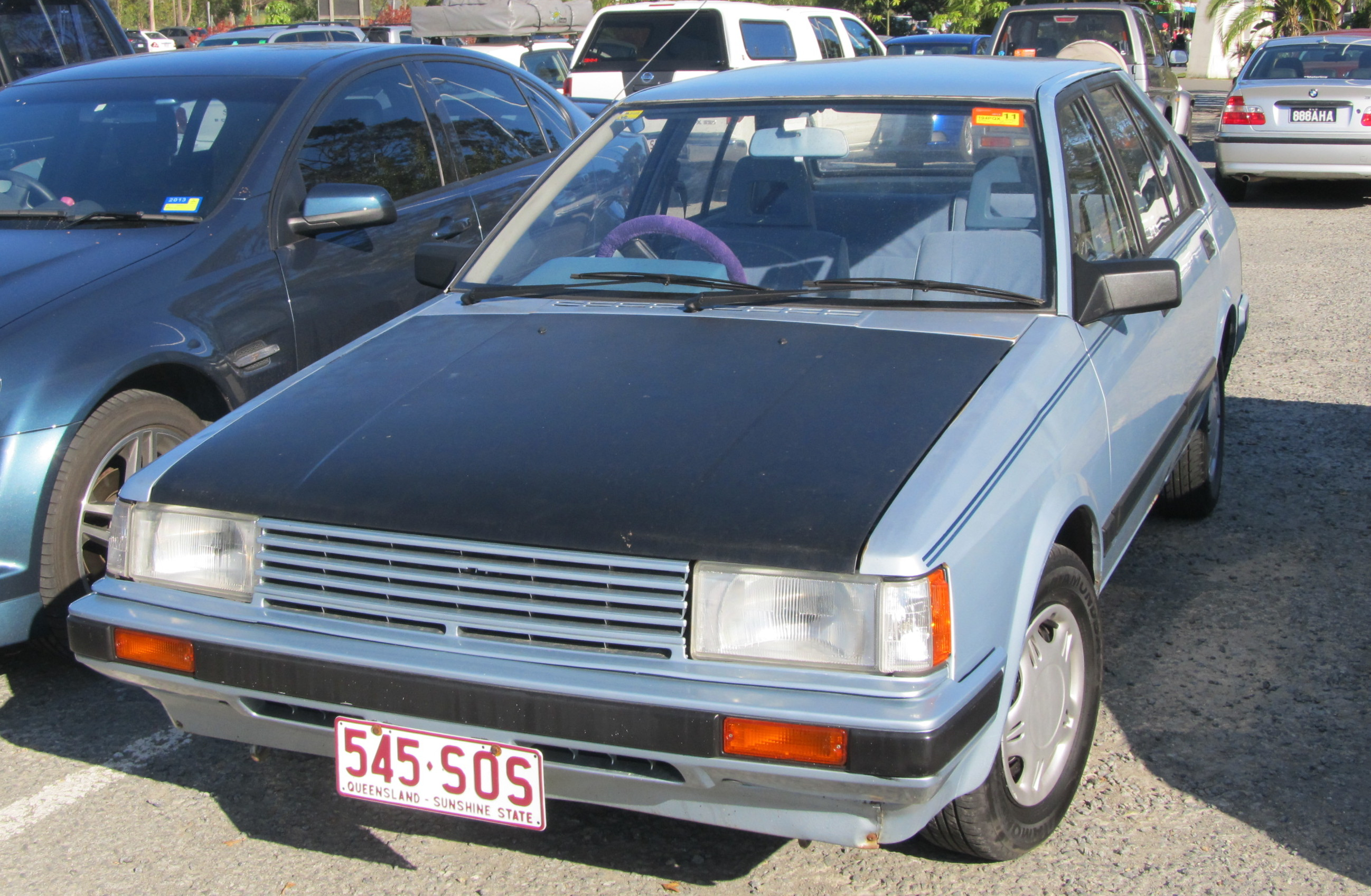

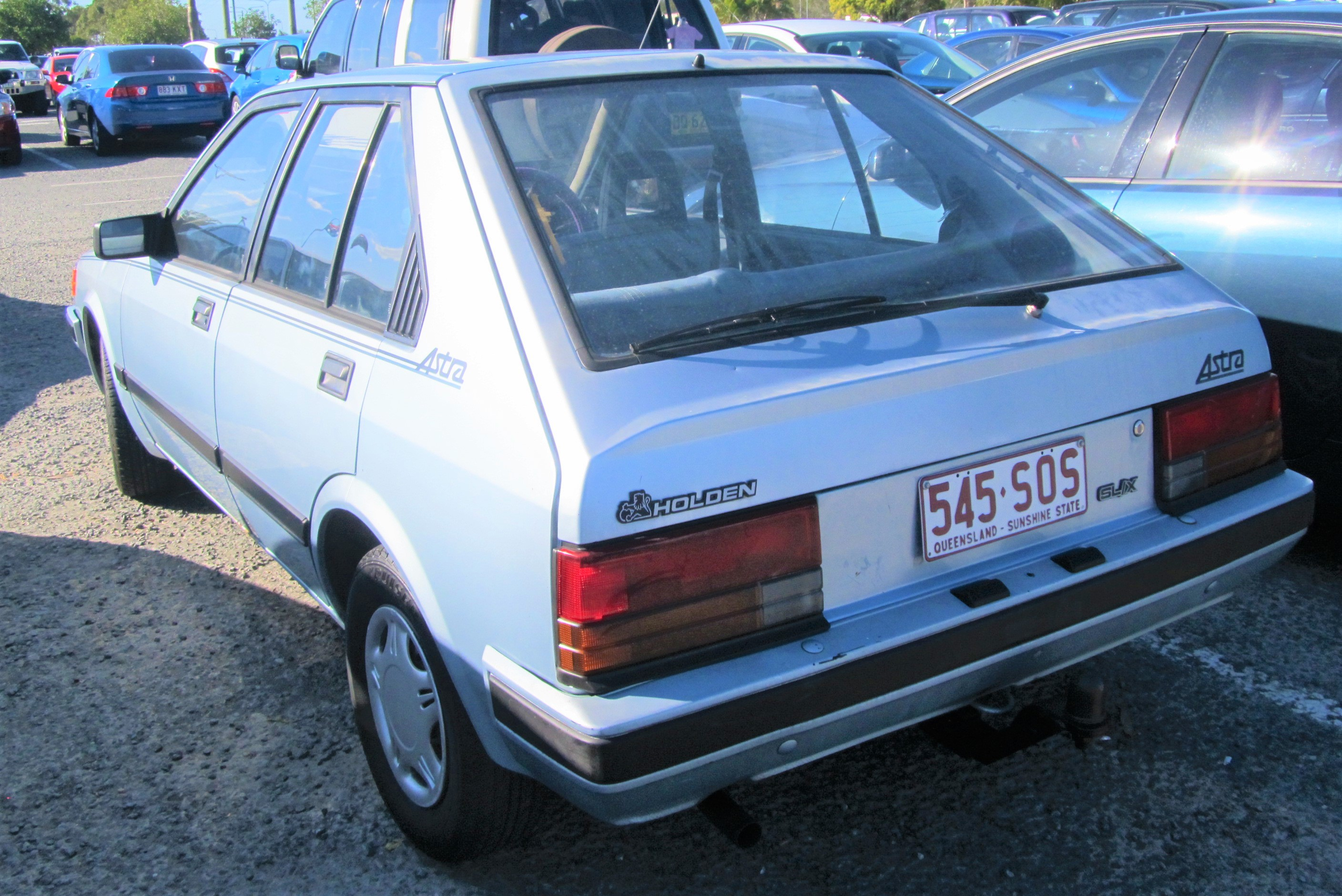
1986 Holden Astra SLX (LC; facelift)

Compared to the N12 Pulsar, the Astra LB sported a distinctive grille, the work of Australian stylist Paul Beranger housing the Holden lion insignia in the centre. Also unique were Astra-only tail lamps, badging and decals.

A revised LC model was released in April 1986. Unleaded-fuel requirements uprated the engine displacement to 1.6 litres, power to 60 kilowatts (80 hp) and torque to 124 newton-metres (91 ft⋅lbf). Model and trim changes were also a part of the update, including a new grille insert, and the addition of an SL model positioned below the SL/X and SL/E levels.

The Used Car Safety Ratings, published in 2008 by Monash University, found that first generation Astras (LB/LC) provide a "significantly worse than average" level of occupant safety protection in the event of an accident.

=== Specification levels ===
Two trim levels, the SL/X and the SL/E were offered in the LB Astra series, although a basic SL model arrived in 1986 with the LC upgrade.

- SL: entry-level model available upon the LC's introduction.
- SL/X: introduced with LB series featured cloth trim, a digital clock and a combined radio receiver and Compact Cassette player.
- SL/E: added alloy wheels among other features to the equipment list. However, the LC update saw the SL/E specification downgraded from alloy wheels to steel wheels with plastic wheel covers.

== Second generation (LD; 1987–1989) ==
Second generation (LD)
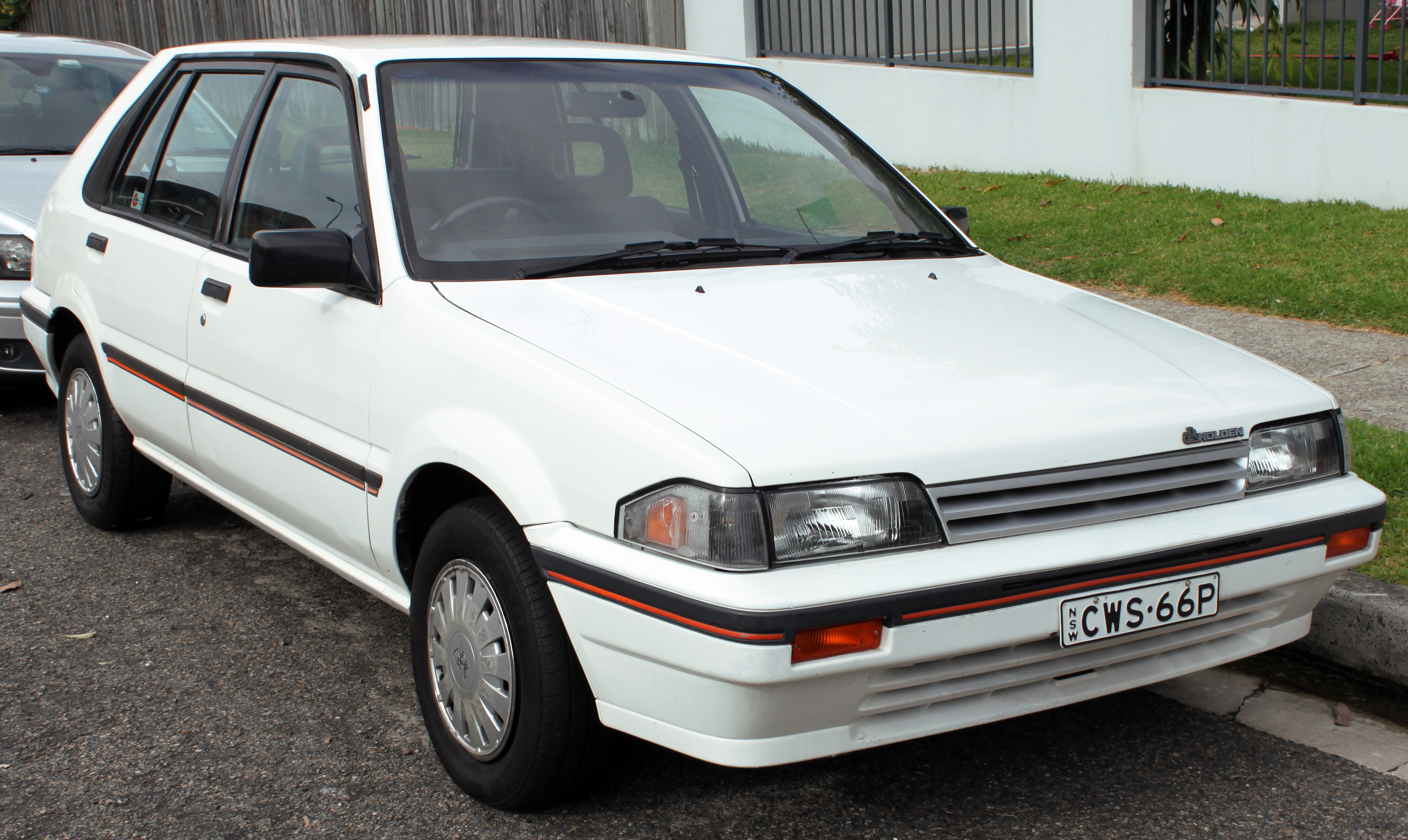

Overview
- Also called: Nissan Pulsar (N13)
- Production: 1987–1989

Body and chassis
- Body style: 4-door sedan 5-door hatchback

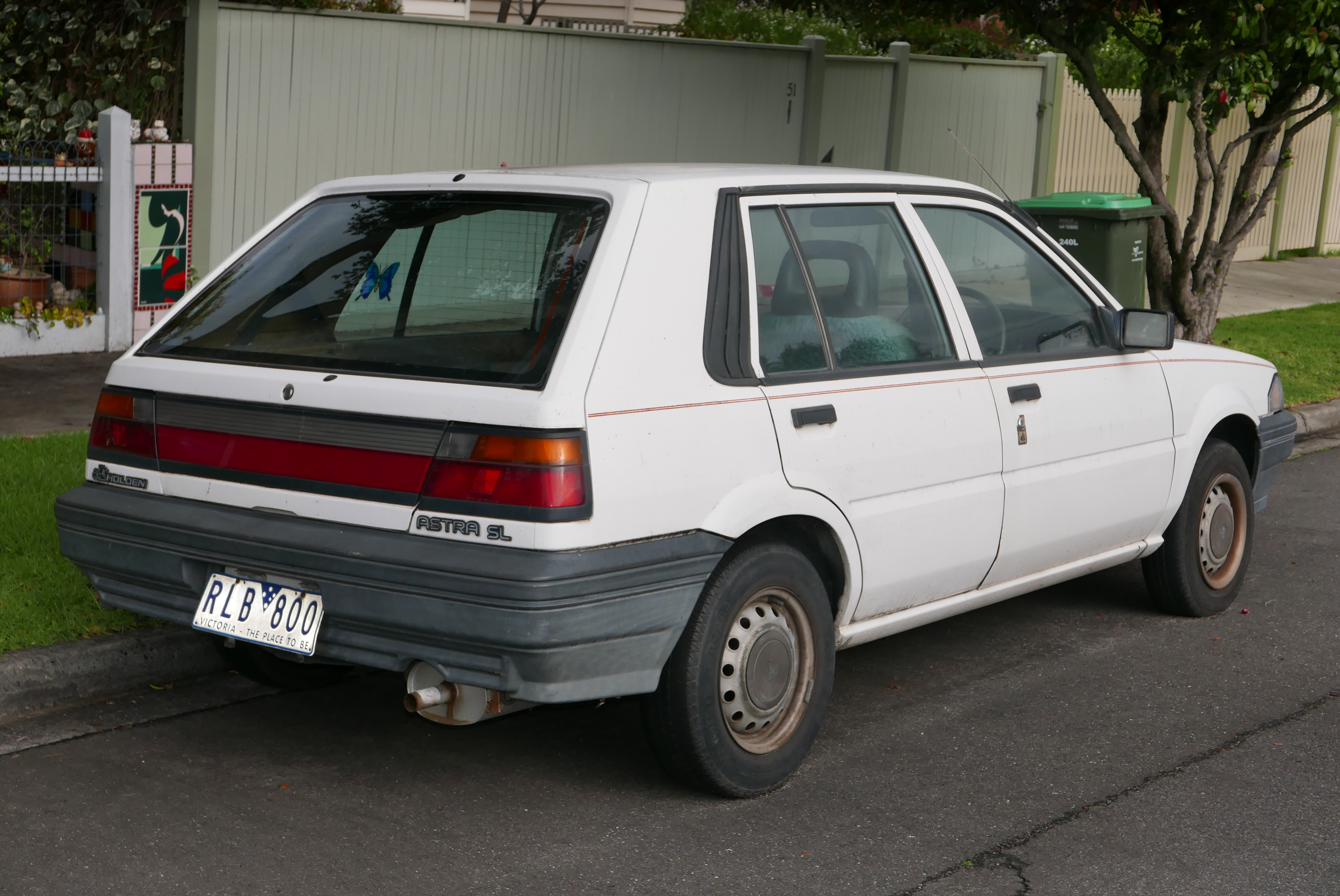
1987–1989 Holden Astra SL hatchback (LD)

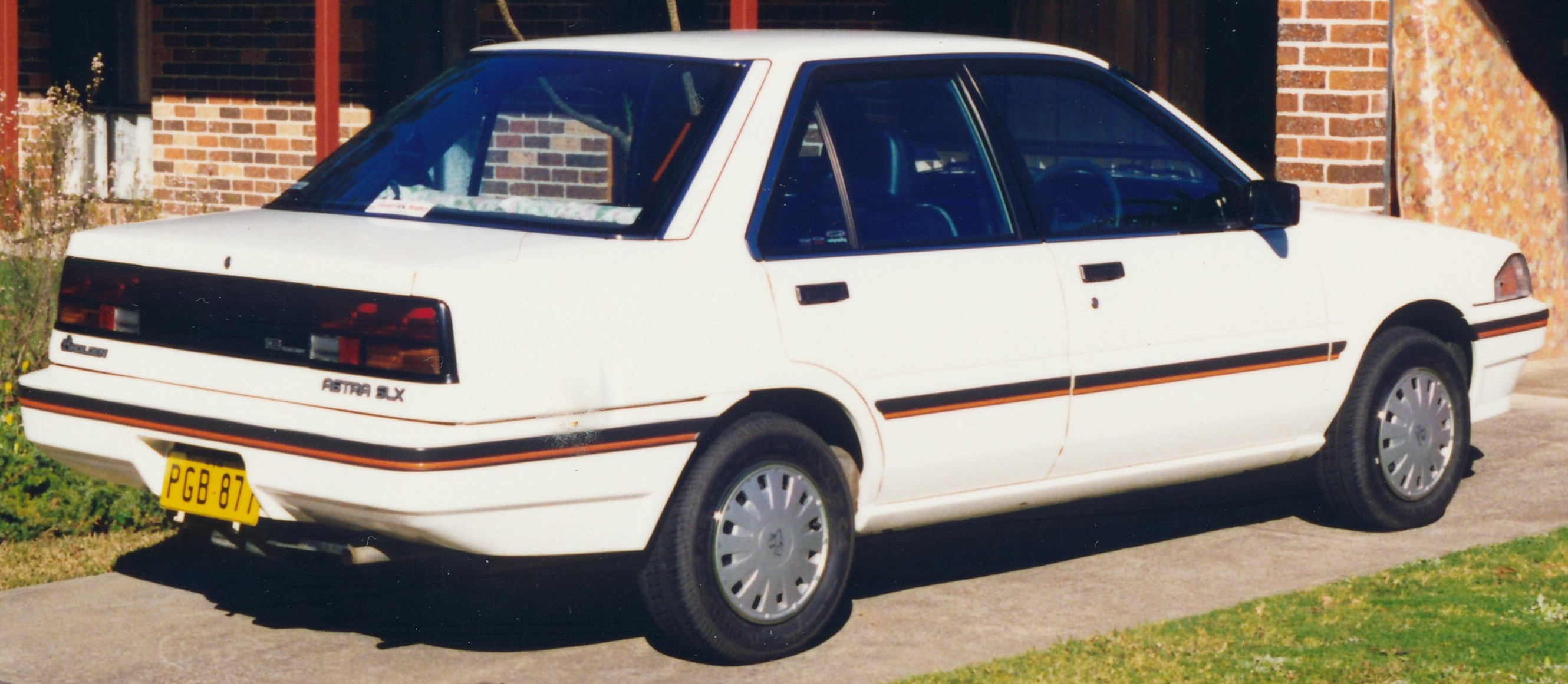
1987–1989 Holden Astra SLX sedan (LD)

For the second generation LD Astra, the Nissan Pulsar was again used as the basis, this time using the latest N13 series. Unlike before, the LD was the result of a proper joint venture development programme. That is, Nissan provided the bodywork and Holden supplied powertrains for fitment in both applications.

Launched concurrently in July 1987, both the LD Astra and N13 Pulsar were offered in four-door sedan and five-door hatchback body styles. Outside of Australia though, three-door hatchback and station wagon body variants of the Nissan were also available.

Both 1.6 (55 kilowatts (74 hp); 135 newton-metres (100 ft⋅lbf)) and 1.8-litre (79 kilowatts (106 hp); 151 newton-metres (111 ft⋅lbf)) displacements of Holden's Family II engine were offered in the Astra-Pulsar models. Badged as 1.6 and 1.8 injection, respectively, the term "injection" denoted the utilisation of fuel injection.

In July 1989, all associations with Nissan were severed and a new agreement between Toyota was formed. This relationship, known as the United Australian Automobile Industries (UAAI) was a continuation of the Australian Government's Button Plan that started with Nissan. Nissan continued to use the Holden engines until 1991 before replacing their N13 Pulsar line with the N14, while at the same time entering a new model sharing alliance with Ford.

The Used Car Safety Ratings evaluation from 2008 found that LD series Astras provide a "worse than average" level of occupant protection in the event of an accident.

=== Specification levels ===
Of the three trim specifications offered, the SLX and SLE nameplates no longer featured the "/" symbol, as in SL/X. Besides this anomaly, the LD range mirrored that of the LC Astra:

- SL: entry-level variant, available only as five-door hatchback, featuring the five-speed manual transmission and 1.6-litre engine combination. The brake setup for the LD series Astra in any specification was a disc/drum setup, whereas the equivalent Australian Pulsars had four-wheel disc brakes as standard.
- SLX: was the second tier variant fitted with the 1.8-litre engine in coupled to either a five-speed manual or three-speed automatic transmission. The SLX also featured full plastic wheel trims, as opposed to the steel centre hubcap fitted to the SL.
- SLE: was the highest specification offered, available only as an automatic 1.8-litre. The SLE was equivalent to Pulsar's GXE specification.

=== HSV Astra SV1800 ===
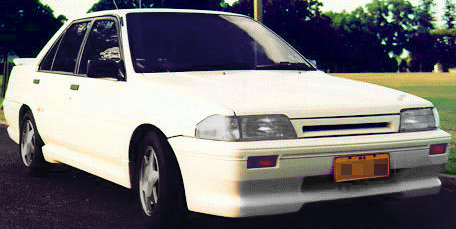
HSV Astra SV1800

In September 1988, Holden Special Vehicles (HSV) launched the HSV Astra SV1800, which was a tuned version of the LD Astra. 65 vehicles were produced, consisting of 30 hatchbacks and 35 sedans. Upgrades from the standard Astra were limited to cosmetic and suspension changes, with both "Stage 1" and "Stage 2" suspension setups offered.

=== HSV Astra Aero ===
Alongside the SV1800 HSV built a toned down version of the LD Astra, sold as the Aero. Approximately 150 cars were created.

== Third generation (TR; 1995) ==
Third generation (TR)
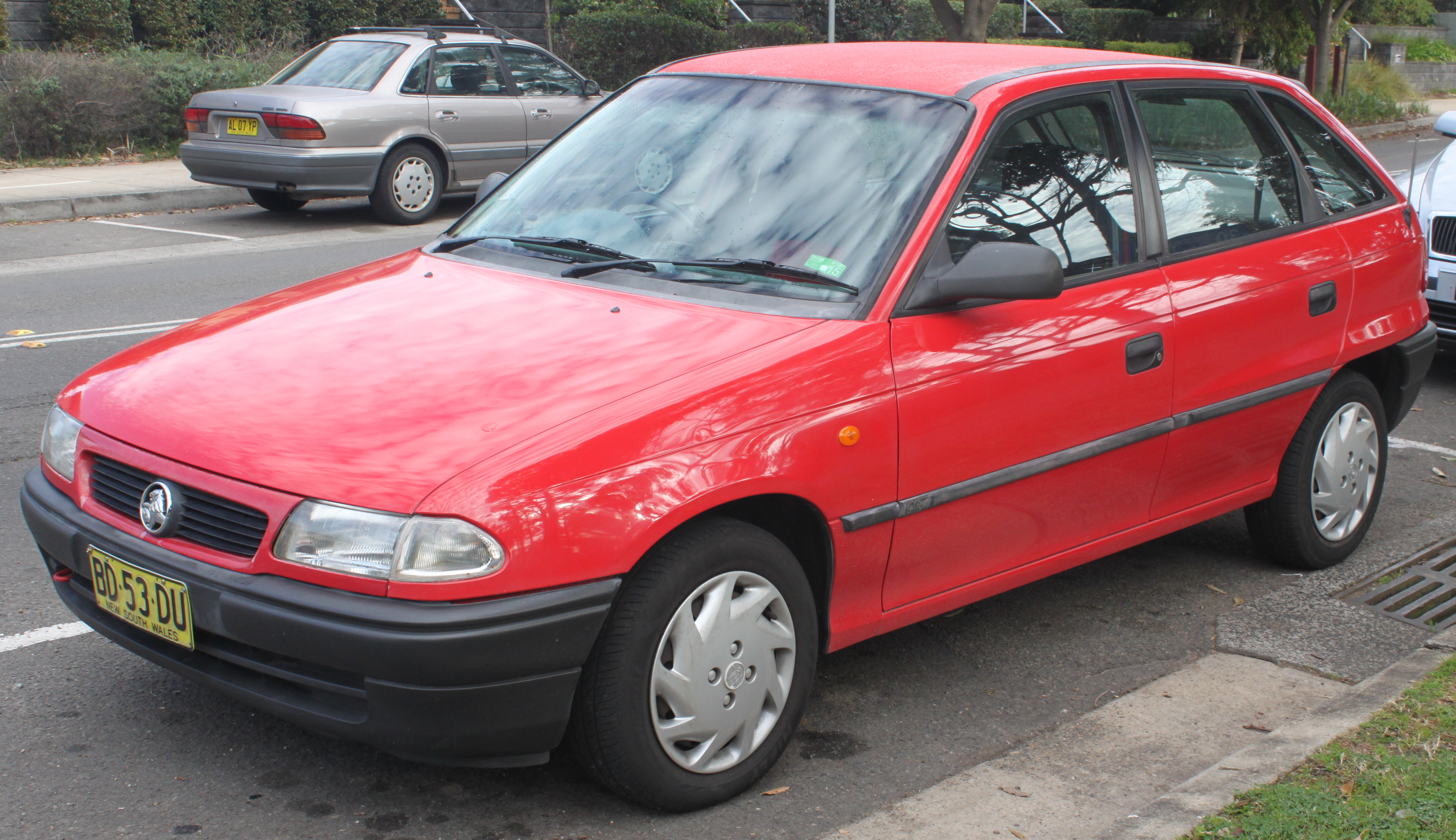

Overview
- Also called: Opel Astra (Europe); Opel Optima (Indonesia); Vauxhall Astra (United Kingdom); Chevrolet Astra
- Production: 1995–1998
- Assembly: United Kingdom: Ellesmere Port (Vauxhall Ellesmere Port)

Body and chassis
- Body style: 4-door sedan 5-door hatchback

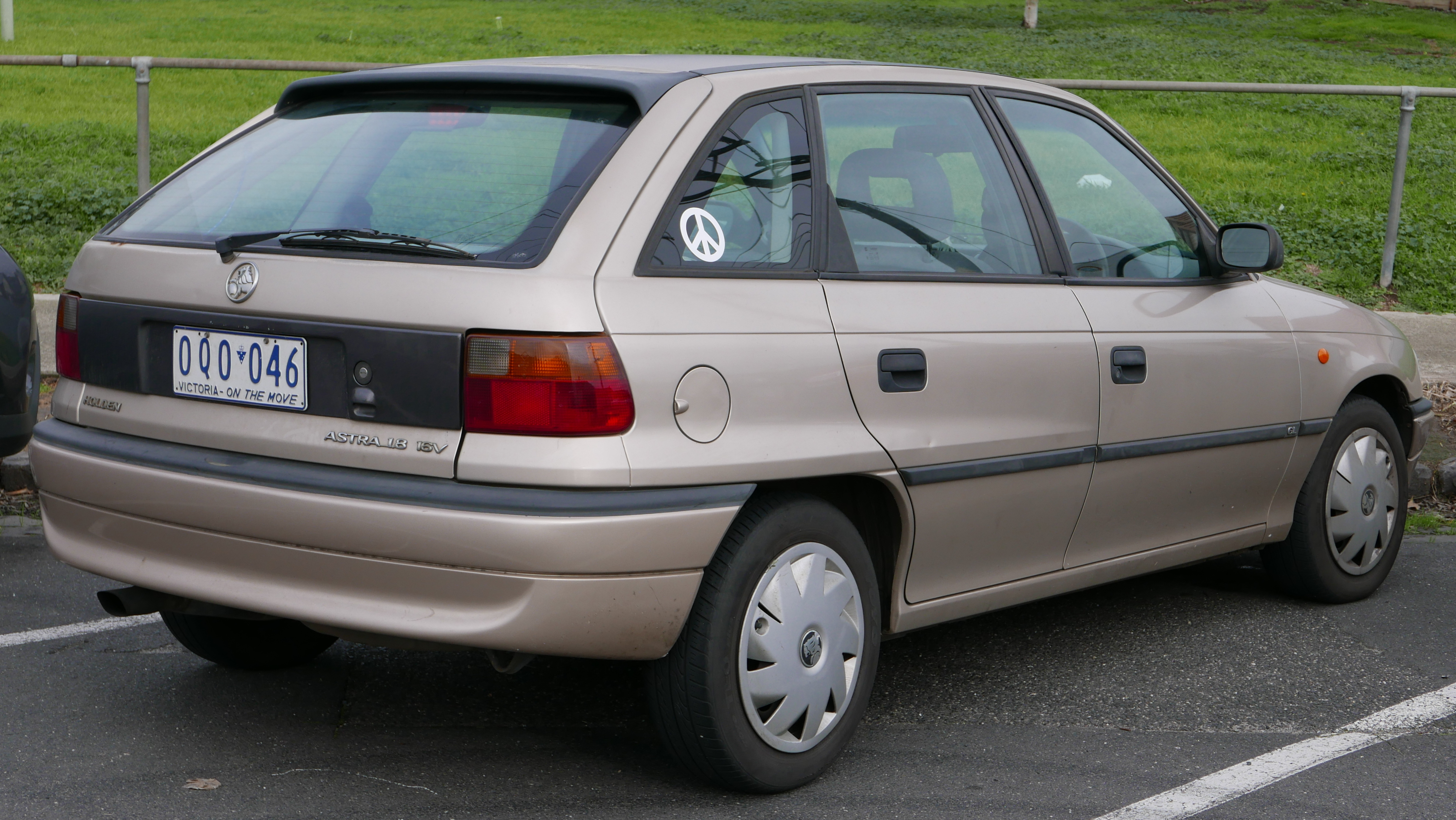
Holden Astra GL hatchback

In 1995, the Holden Astra name was used again, this time in New Zealand for a model based on the Opel Astra F, Opel being the General Motors subsidiary in Germany. Imported from Vauxhall's Ellesmere Port plant in the UK, this third-generation Astra model and was sold as a four-door sedan, five-door hatchback and five-door wagon. The exterior styling also featured Vauxhall's new corporate 'V' front grille first seen on the 1994 Vauxhall Omega.

Holden in Australia did not sell the Opel-based Astra, known as the TR series, until September 1996, after the dissolution of Australian Government Button car plan. This resulted in the collapse of UAAI, the Holden-Toyota alliance, and as result Holden opted to return to marketing rebadged General Motors vehicles. Between 1989 and 1996, the Astra's role was fulfilled by the Nova, Holden's version of Toyota's Corolla (E90 and E100). Unlike New Zealand, the wagon was not offered.

During this period of badge engineering in Australia, General Motors New Zealand had used Opel as one of its main marques alongside Holden and Isuzu. Because the Button plan or local equivalent never existed in New Zealand, the two initial generations of Holden Astra (LB/LC and LD) were thus never available in that market.

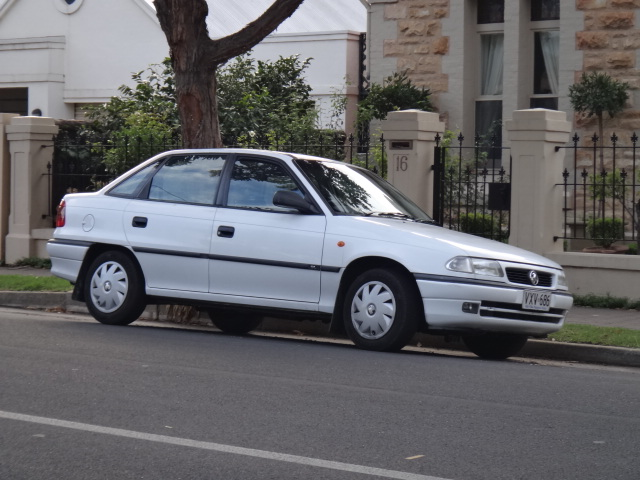
Holden Astra GL sedan

Like the two previous generations, TR Astras were assessed in the 2008 Used Car Safety Ratings, and shown to provide an "average" level of protection.

=== Specification levels ===
- City: was the introductory model featuring a driver's airbag, central locking, and power steering. The engine and transmission combination consisted of a 1.6-litre C16SE engine (74 kilowatts (99 hp); 135 newton-metres (100 ft⋅lbf)) with a five-speed manual.
- GL: editions were fitted with front fog lamps, electric side mirrors and a tachometer over the City, and also featured a 1.8-litre C18SEL engine (85 kilowatts (114 hp); 165 newton-metres (122 ft⋅lbf)) with the option of either manual or automatic transmission.
- GSi: was the sporty hatchback-only entrant, featuring dual airbags, alloy wheels, sports interior trim and suspension, along with a 2.0-litre X20XEV engine (100 kilowatts (130 hp); 188 newton-metres (139 ft⋅lbf)) coupled to a five-speed manual.

== Fourth generation (TS; 1998) ==
Fourth generation (TS)
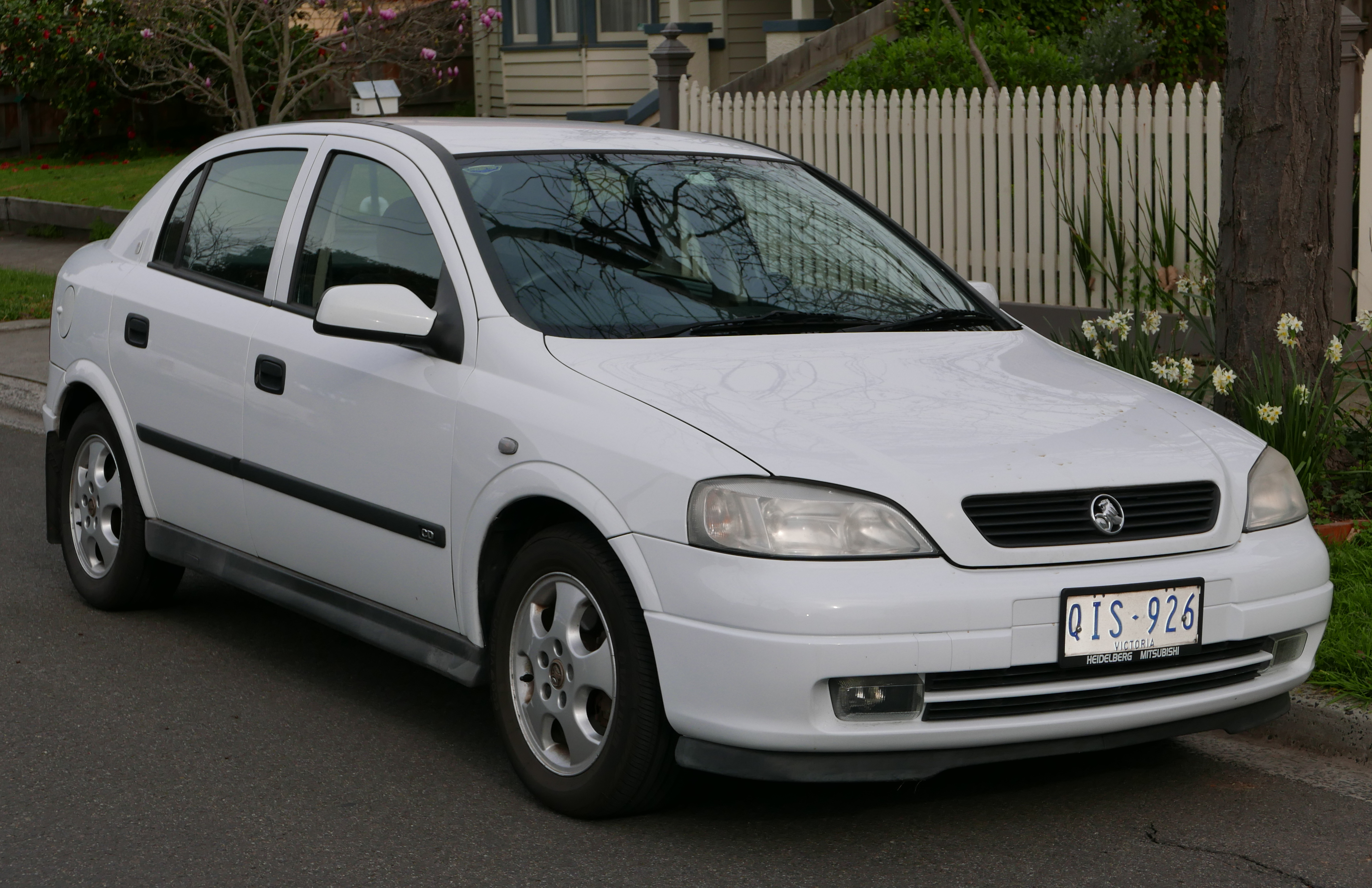

Overview
- Also called: Chevrolet Astra; Chevrolet Viva; Opel Astra; Vauxhall Astra
- Production: 1998–2005
- Assembly: Belgium: Antwerp; Poland: Gliwice (Astra Classic); Italy: Grugliasco (Bertone: convertible)

Body and chassis
- Body style: 2-door Convertible; 3-door Hatchback; 4-door Sedan; 5-door Hatchback; 5-door Wagon (New Zealand)

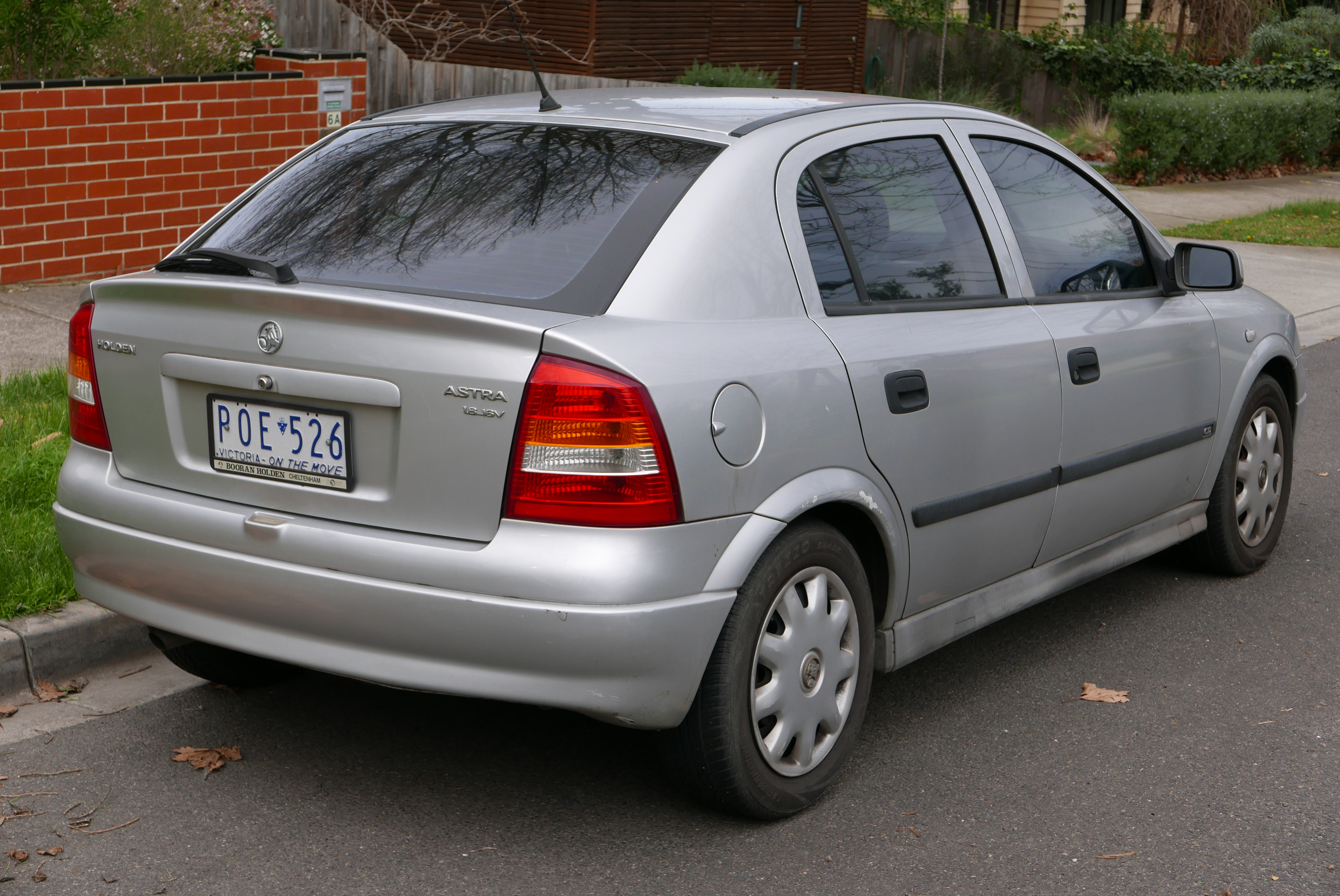
Holden Astra CD 5-door hatchback

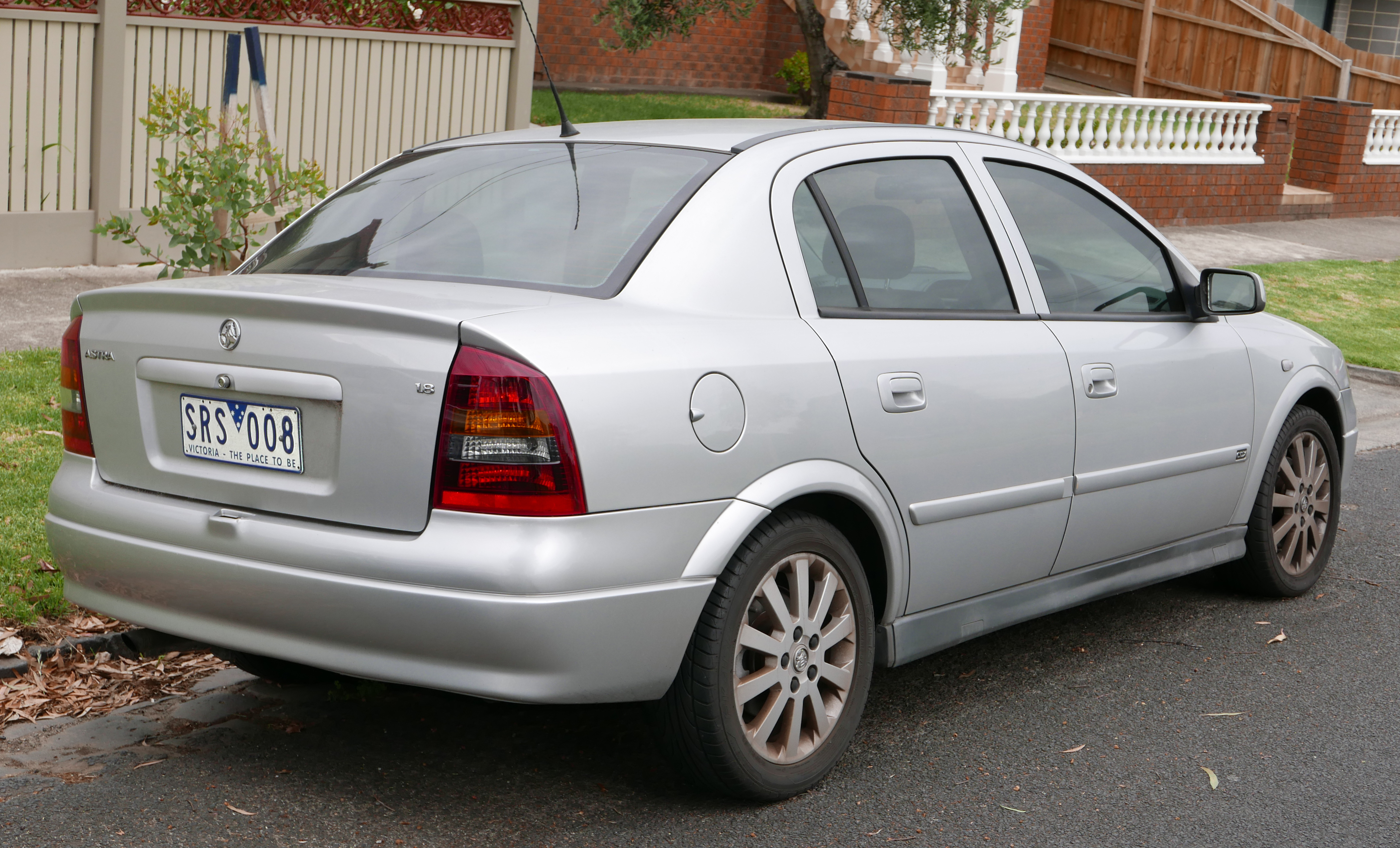
Holden Astra CDX 4-door sedan

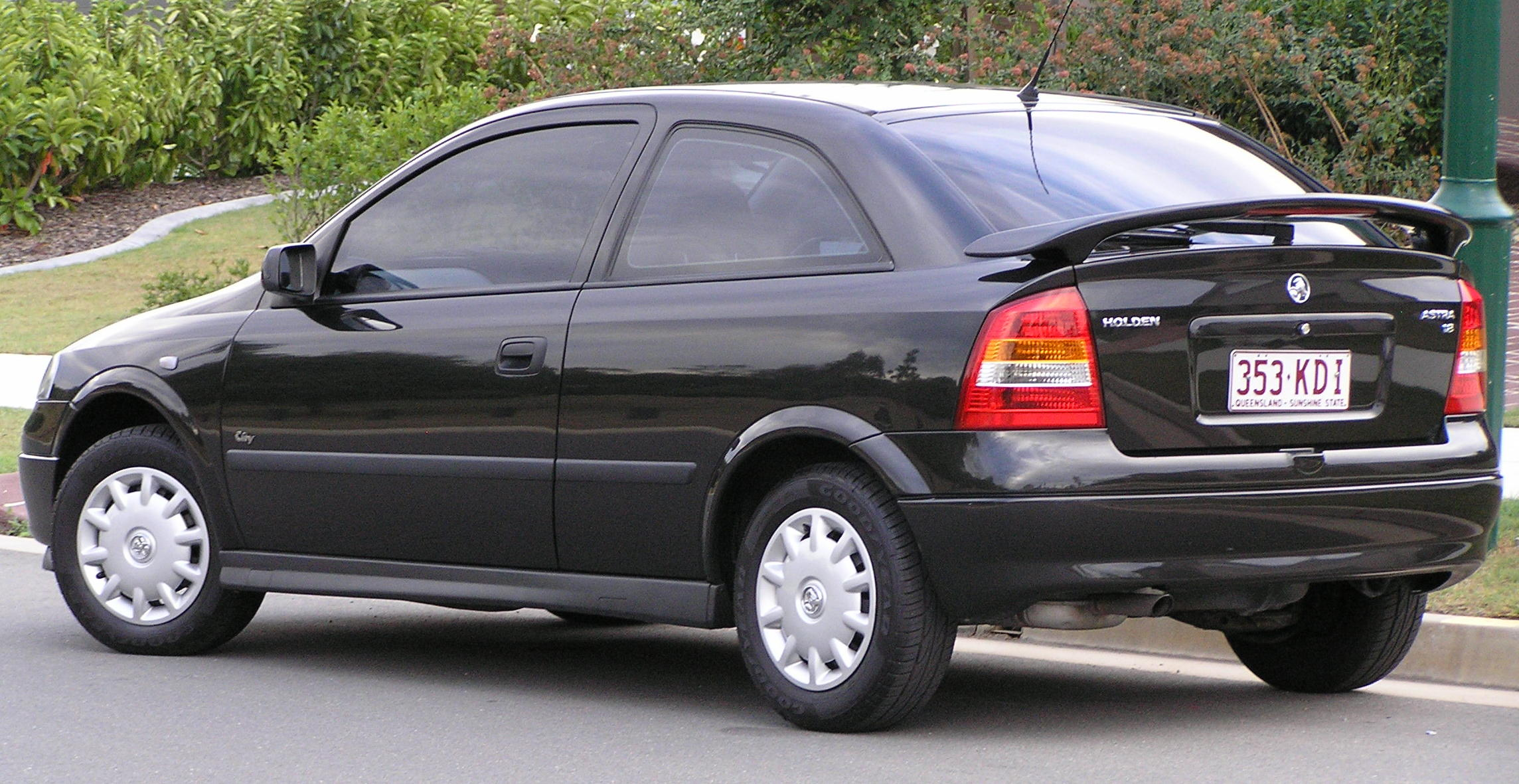
Holden Astra City 3-door hatchback

In September 1998, the Astra was replaced again with a German Opel-engineered, Belgium-built version. Known as the TS Astra, it was equipped with either a 90-kilowatt (120 hp) 1.8- or a 2.2-litre petrol engine and was offered in City, CD, CDX, SXi and SRi specifications. The SRi was three-door hatchback only, and the standard Astra was only available with a 1.8-litre 16-valve engine. Models with a 5-stud wheel pattern have the ABS option factory-installed. The Astra CD gained 15-inch alloy wheels as standard equipment in circa 1999, replacing the steel wheels with hubcaps previously standard.

The TS Astra model change followed that of the Opel Astra G range, including the sedan, hatchback and convertible. However, the coupé by Bertone was not offered with a Holden badge. The drivetrain was identical to other cars in the Astra lineup, and as such, was not a bona-fide sports car. Like the Astra F, the Astra G was available as a wagon in New Zealand, but not Australia. In 2003, a 147-kilowatt (197 hp) 2.0-litre turbo engine became available. The standard Astra was only available with a 1.8-litre 16-valve engine, and lived on until 2005 as the Holden Astra Classic, alongside the new model. The philosophy behind this was for Holden to remain competitive in the market until the cheaper Viva model was introduced.

In accordance to the Monash University's 2008 update to the Used Car Safety Ratings, TS Astra models were rated "better than average" in the field of crash safety protection.

=== Specification levels ===
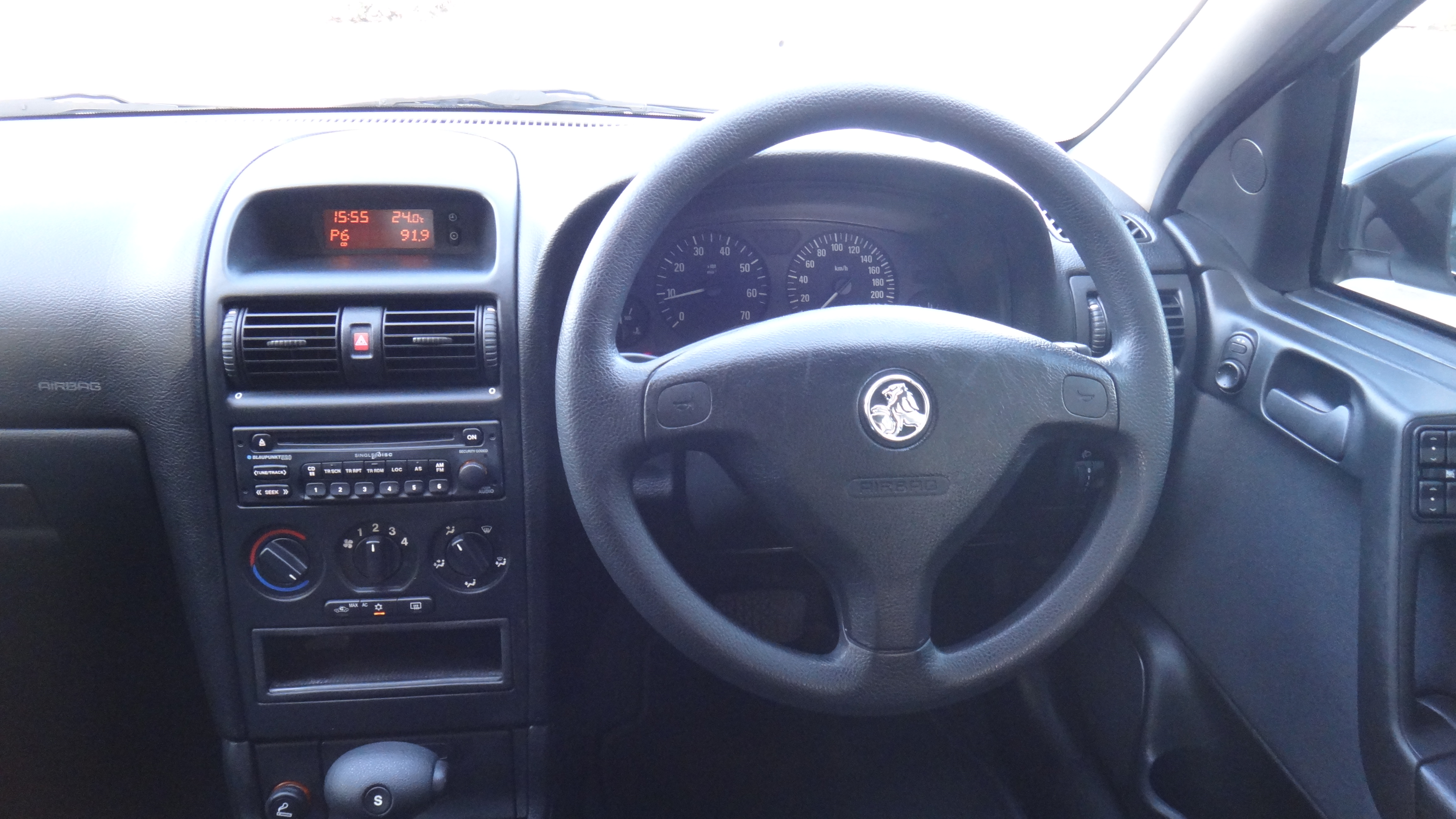
Interior

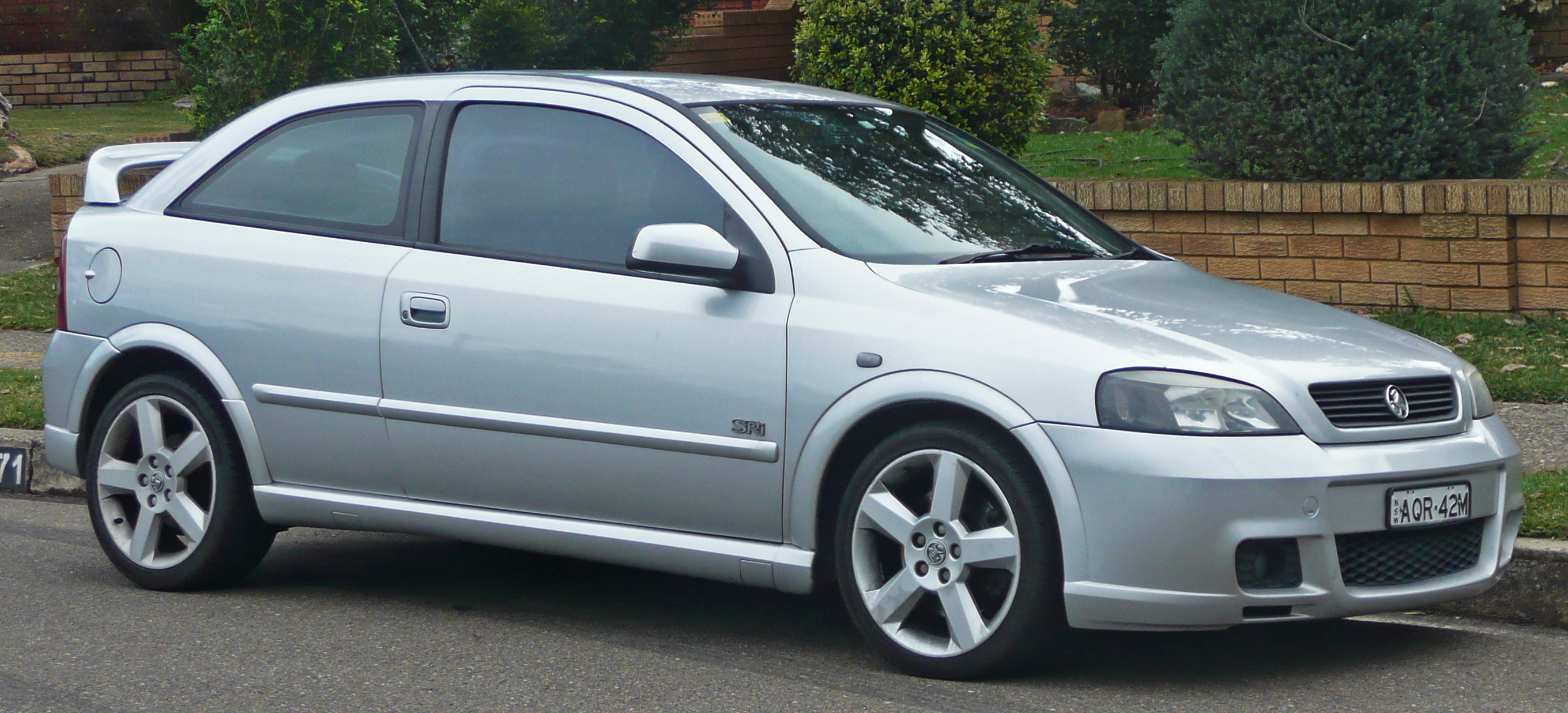

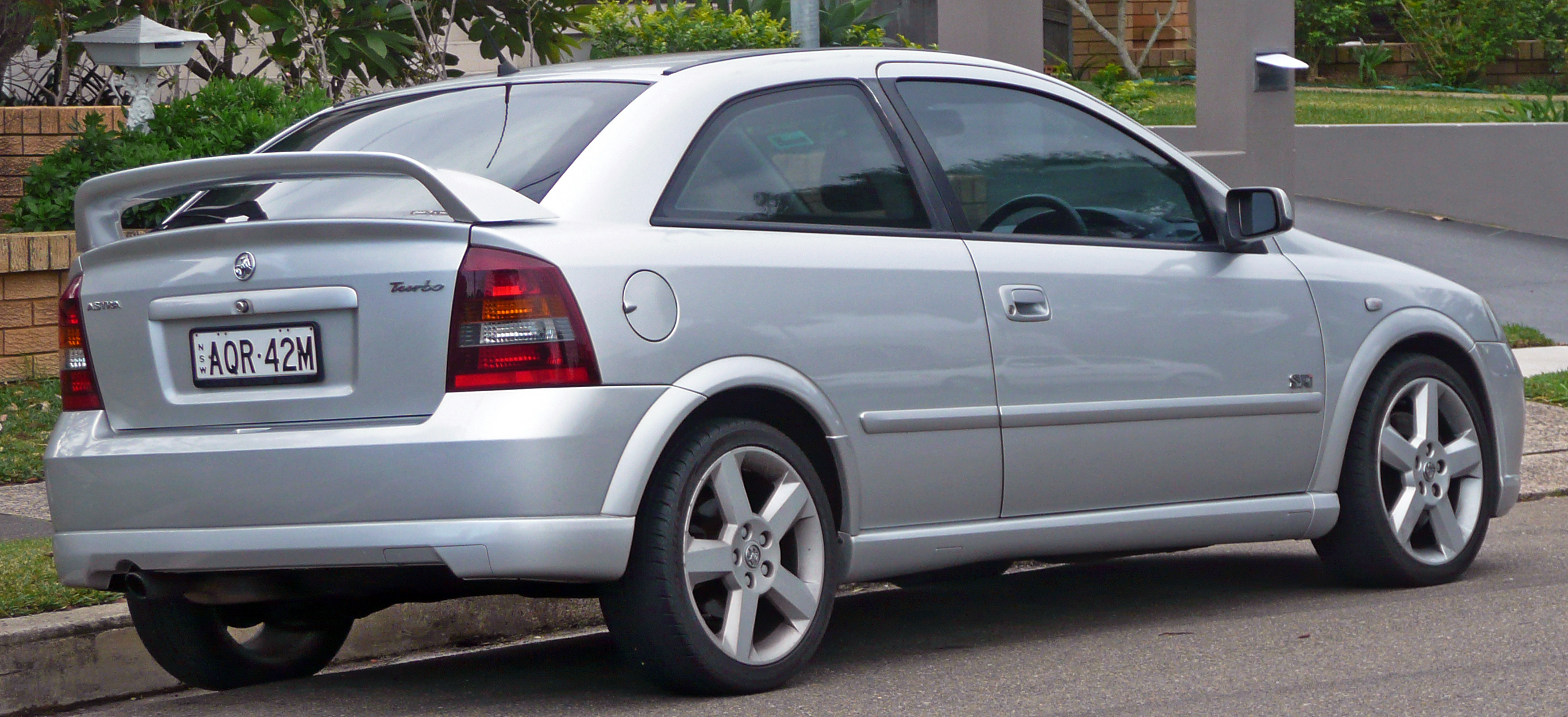
Holden Astra SRi Turbo 3-door

- City: was the most basic TS model, available as a three- and five-door with a six-speaker audio system, dual airbags, disc brakes, adjustable headlamps, and triple information display. The engine was the 1.8-litre X18XE1 engine with 85 kW (114 hp) (1998–2000) and the uprated Z18XE with 92 kW (123 hp) (2001–2004).
- CD: included City features, plus 15-inch alloy wheels, a CD player, ABS brakes, traction control, air conditioning, electronic mirrors, and power windows. Optional equipment available were: front fog lamps, 16-inch alloy wheels, cruise control, and a rear spoiler.
- CDX: released in December 2002 for MY03 and added over the CD version: cruise control, front fog lamps, climate control air conditioning, chrome trim around dials, side airbags (curtain airbags were also an option for MY04 models), heated leather seats and leather upholstery, and a larger, higher resolution MFD (multi-info display) with radio info, date, time, outside temperature, trip computer with instantaneous fuel consumption and L/100 km, distance to empty, crucial vehicle alerts (check control) and stopwatch.
- SXi replaced the City three-door for MY03 and sold between December 2002 and 2004. Over the previous City three-door, the SXi added front fog lamps and sports trim. Optional features included, a CD player, ABS brakes, alloy wheels, air conditioning, and a rear spoiler.
- SRi: released in October 2001 and carried the same equipment as the SXi, but was based on the CD variant except fitted with the 2.2-litre Z22SE engine.
- SRi Turbo: introduced in May 2003 as part of MY03 changes, this model is based on the SRi, except fitted with the 2.0-litre Z20LET turbocharged engine and has more standard equipment.
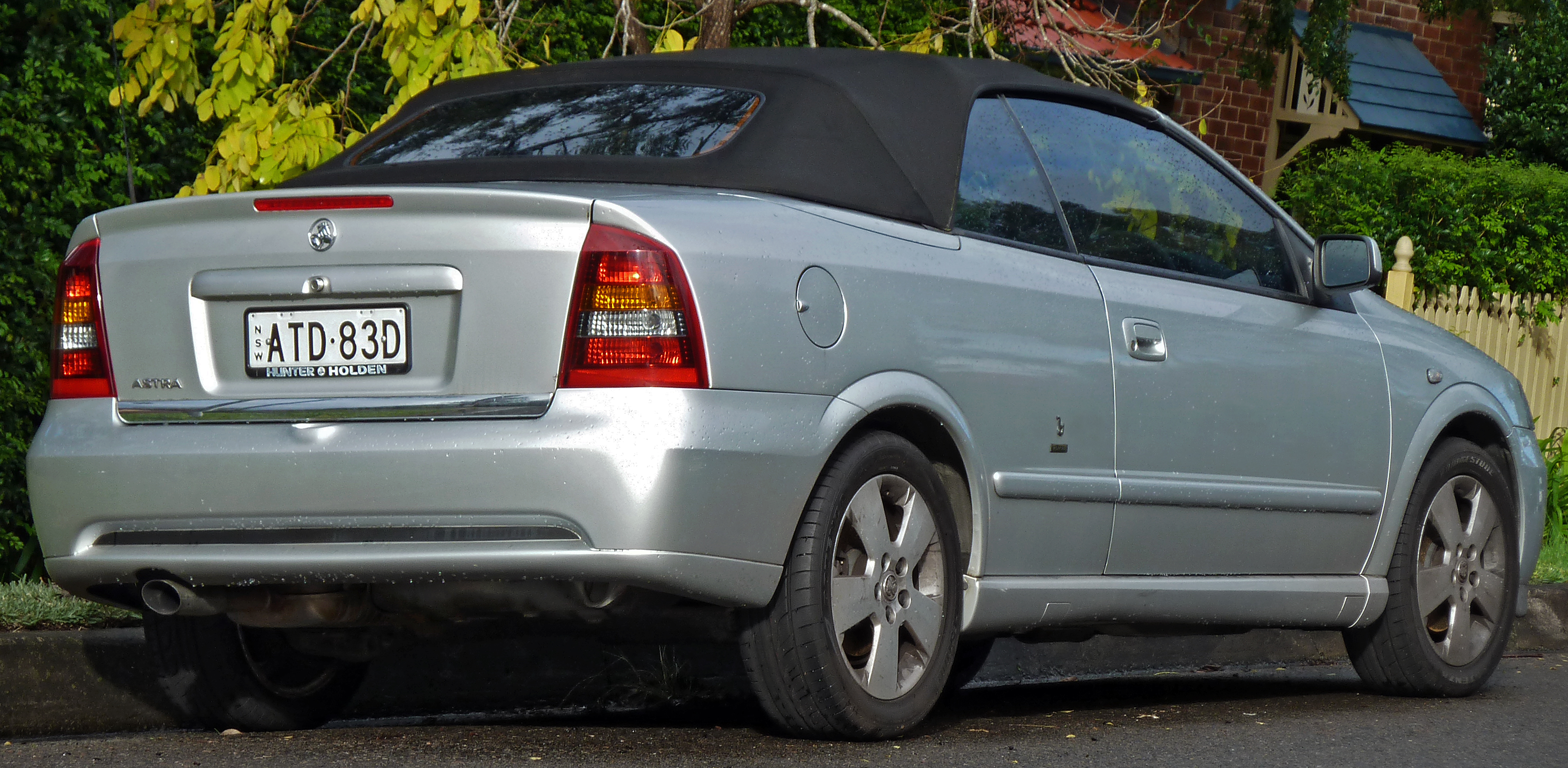
  Holden Astra convertible
- Convertible: released in December 2001 and fitted with the 2.2-litre Z22SE engine. Convertible Turbo models arrived in May 2003 with the 2.0-litre Z20LET engine.

Limited editions

- Olympic Edition: Holden produced Olympic Editions of both the City and CD grades edition launched in July 2000, included "Sydney 2000" Olympic badging.
- Equipe: was based on the Astra City, but added 15-inch alloy wheels and various combinations of extra features including cruise control, power windows, electric side-view mirrors, fog lamps, ABS Brakes and a rear spoiler. Equipe model was released in April 2001, April 2002, April 2003 and September 2003, and lasted until 2005 (MY05)
- Limited Edition: special edition for the convertible, released in March 2004. Distinguished by 17-inch five-spoke alloy wheels, pale beige leather interior trim, rear parking sensors and 'China Blue' metallic paint finish.
- Linea Rossa: special edition for the convertible, released in 2004. Distinguished by its 17-inch five-spoke alloy wheels, red and black Nappa leather trim, rear parking sensors, unique instrument cluster, Magma Red paint finish and 'Linea Rossa' sill plates and floor mats.

== Fifth generation (AH; 2004) ==
Fifth generation (AH)
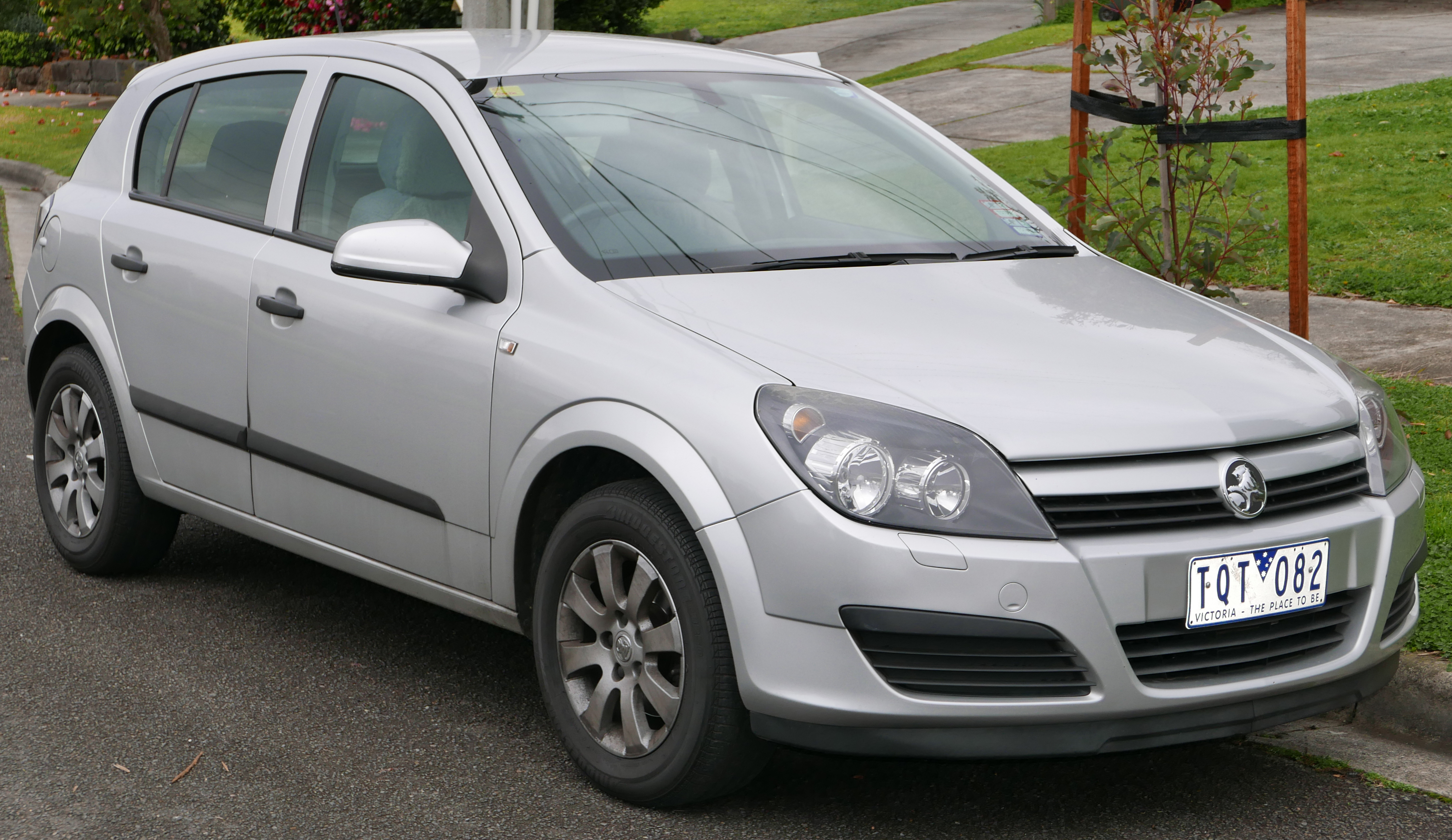
- Holden Astra CD

Overview
- Also called: Chevrolet Astra; Chevrolet Vectra; Opel Astra; Saturn Astra (North America); Vauxhall Astra; HSV VXR
- Production: 2004–2009
- Assembly: Belgium: Antwerp, Belgium (Opel's Antwerp Plant)
- Designer: Friedhelm Engler

Body and chassis
- Body style: 2-door coupé convertible 3-door hatchback 5-door hatchback 5-door station wagon

Dimensions
- Wheelbase: 2,614 mm (102.9 in) (5-door hatchback)
- Length: 4,249 mm (167.3 in) (5-door hatchback)
- Width: 1,753 mm (69.0 in) (5-door hatchback)
- Height: 1,460 mm (57 in) (5-door hatchback)

Chronology
- Successor: Holden Cruze hatchback

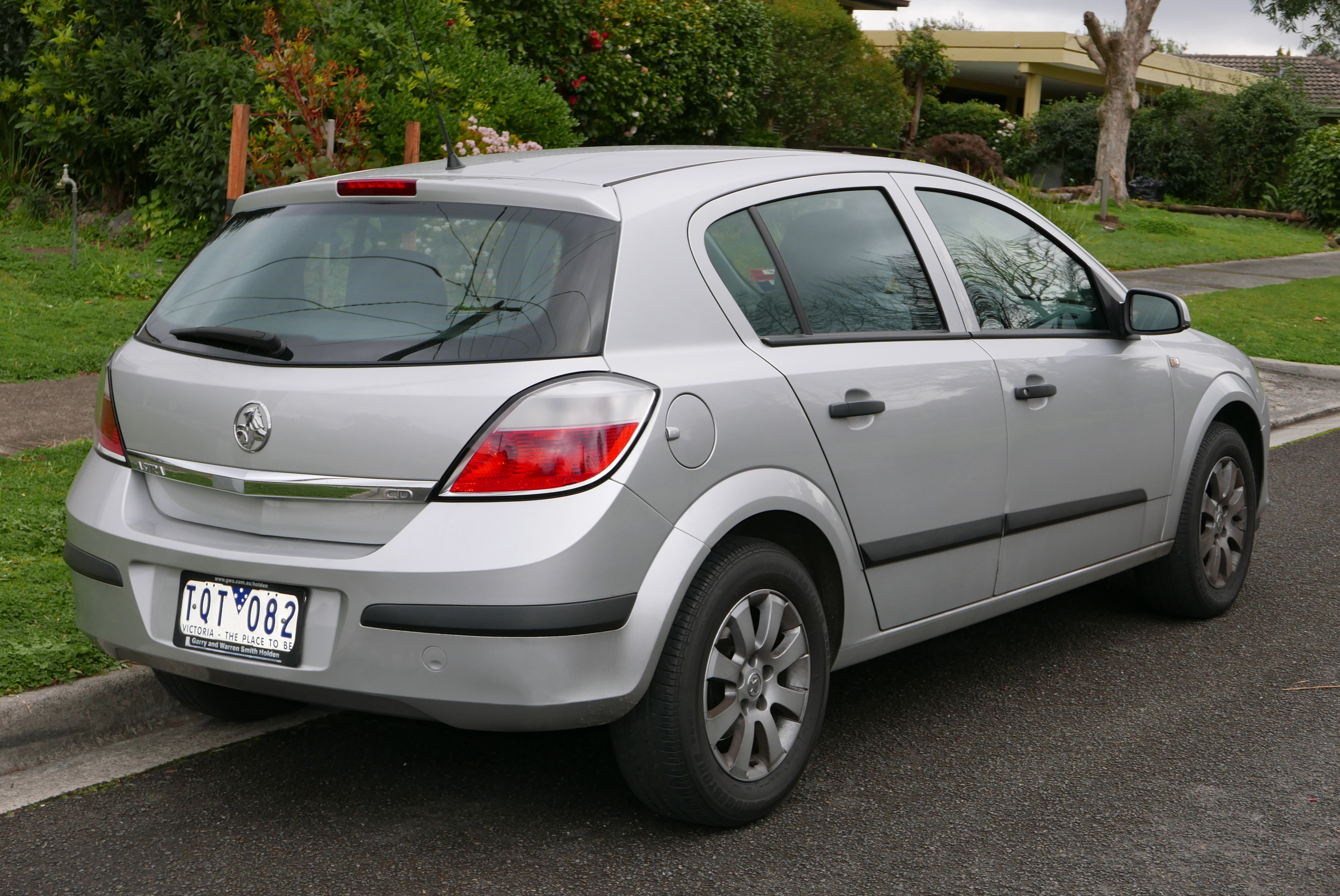
5-door hatchback

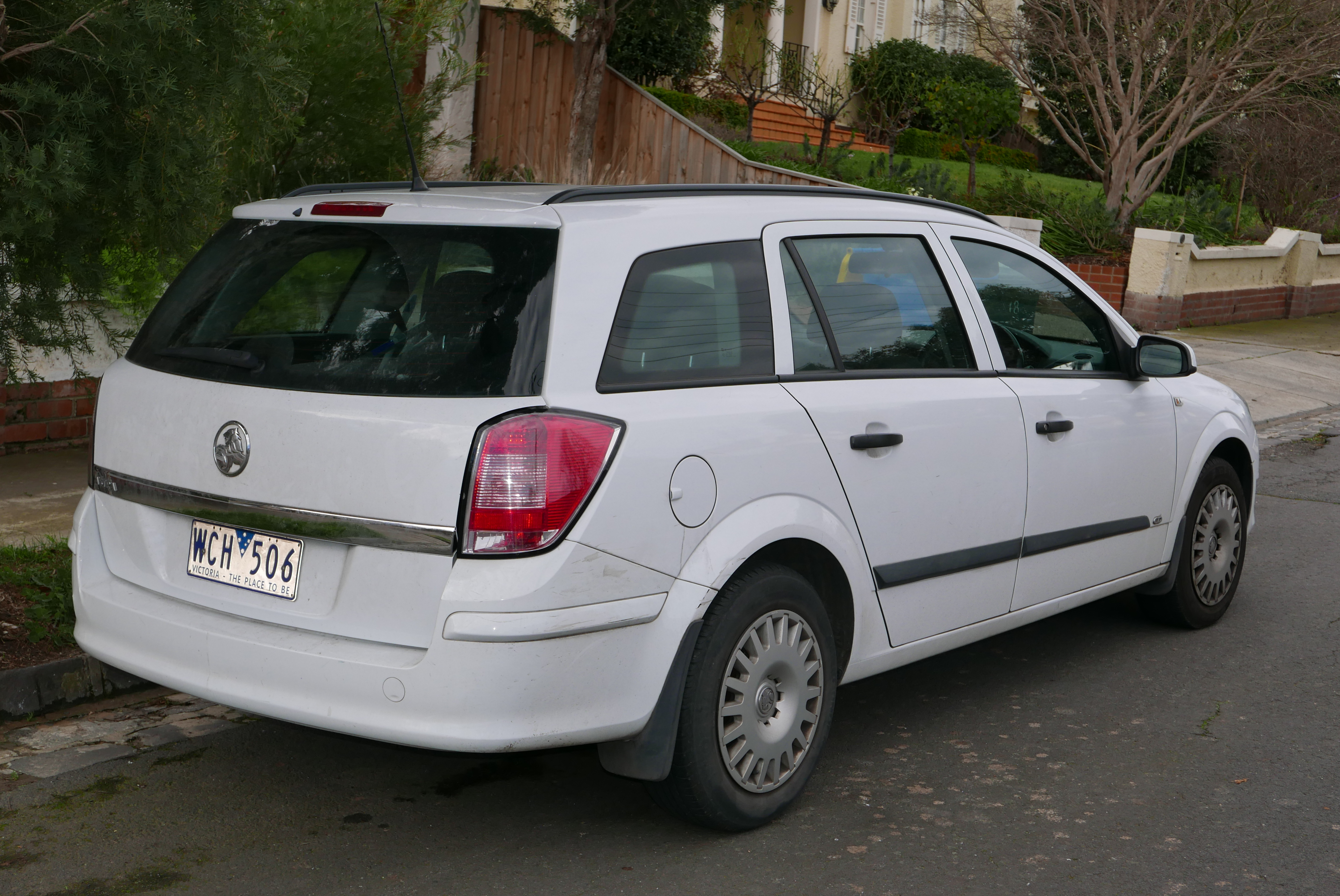
Station wagon

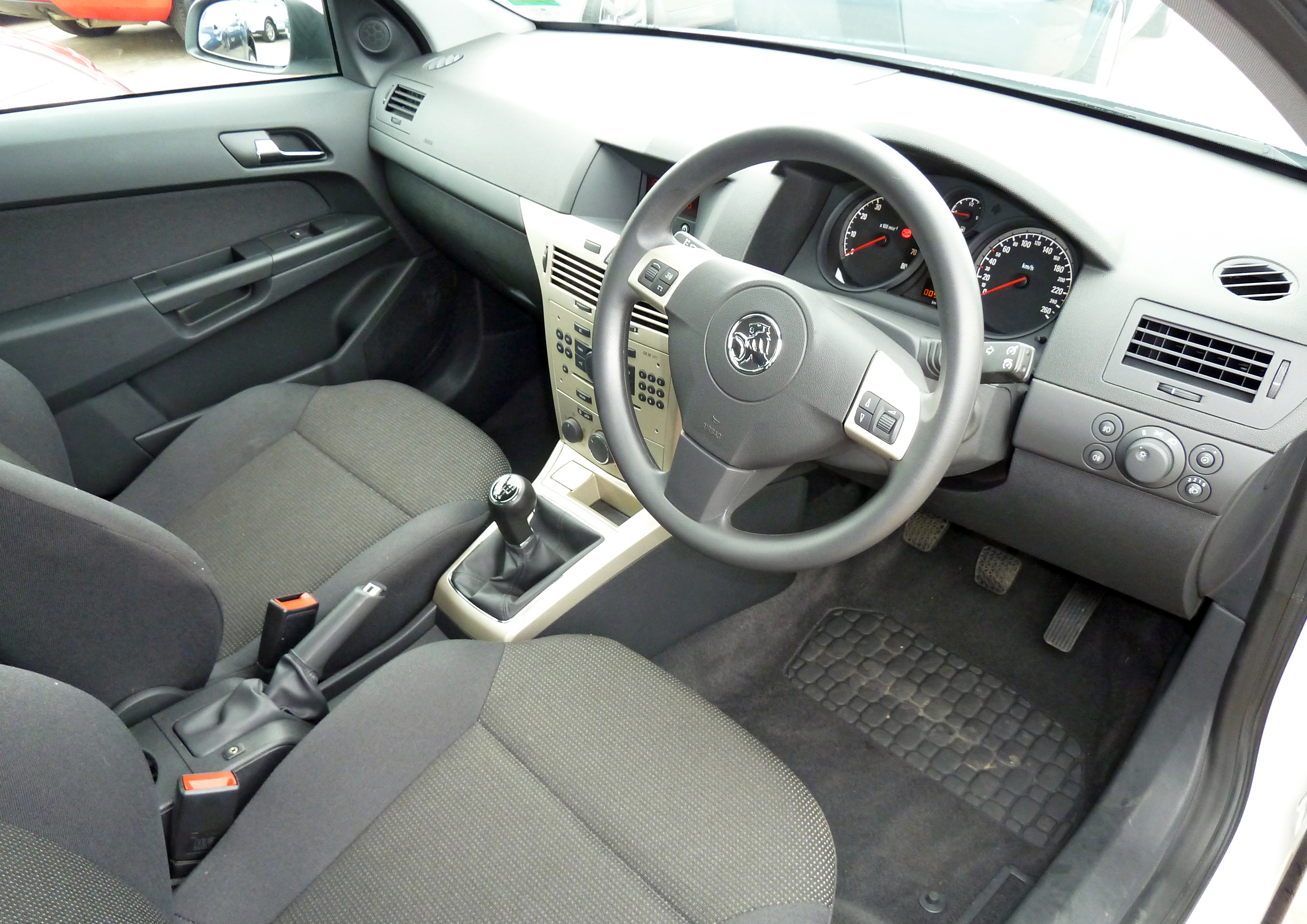
Interior

The fifth generation AH Astra, based on GM's T platform Opel Astra H was launched in November 2004 as a five-door hatchback only, manufactured in Belgium, selling alongside a Polish-built Astra TS sedan and hatchback. The sedan and hatchback TS Astra models carried an "Astra Classic" badge, but were finally dropped in late 2005, replaced by the Holden Viva, a rebadged Daewoo Lacetti. Between 2003 and 2004, the Holden Viva was marketed in Australia as a Daewoo Lacetti before Holden withdrew the brand from Australia due to unsustainably poor sales amid quality & reliability issues.

Like the previous generation, the AH series was found to provide an "average" level of safety according to the 2008 Used Car Safety Ratings. At launch, AH Astras came with front- and side-impact airbags as standard inclusions, allowing the Astra to receive a three-star ANCAP crash safety rating.

Holden did not offer the Astra H sedan due to the presence of the Vectra C, Holden Barina (Daewoo Gentra), Holden Viva (Daewoo Lacetti) and later Holden Epica (Daewoo Tosca) sedans.

Holden suspended importation of the AH Astra on 20 April 2009, citing currency fluctuations, perceived poor resale value and build quality problems. Holden's import cessation, which resulted in no Astras arriving during June and July 2009, coincided with the introduction of the Holden Cruze, reported to be the direct replacement for the Holden Astra. On 31 August 2009, Holden confirmed that the cessation of Astra imports would become permanent, with no intention of further imports of either the then current AH series or the next generation car. Holden stated their small car efforts would now be focused on the new Cruze, instead of the unsuccessful Astra.

=== Model year changes ===
- MY05: the AH range expanded in August 2005 with the release of the Astra coupe and station wagon to uplift slow sales.
- MY06: Released in October 2005, this update saw the Astra CD and CDX models receive a chrome grille in place of the previous body-coloured one.
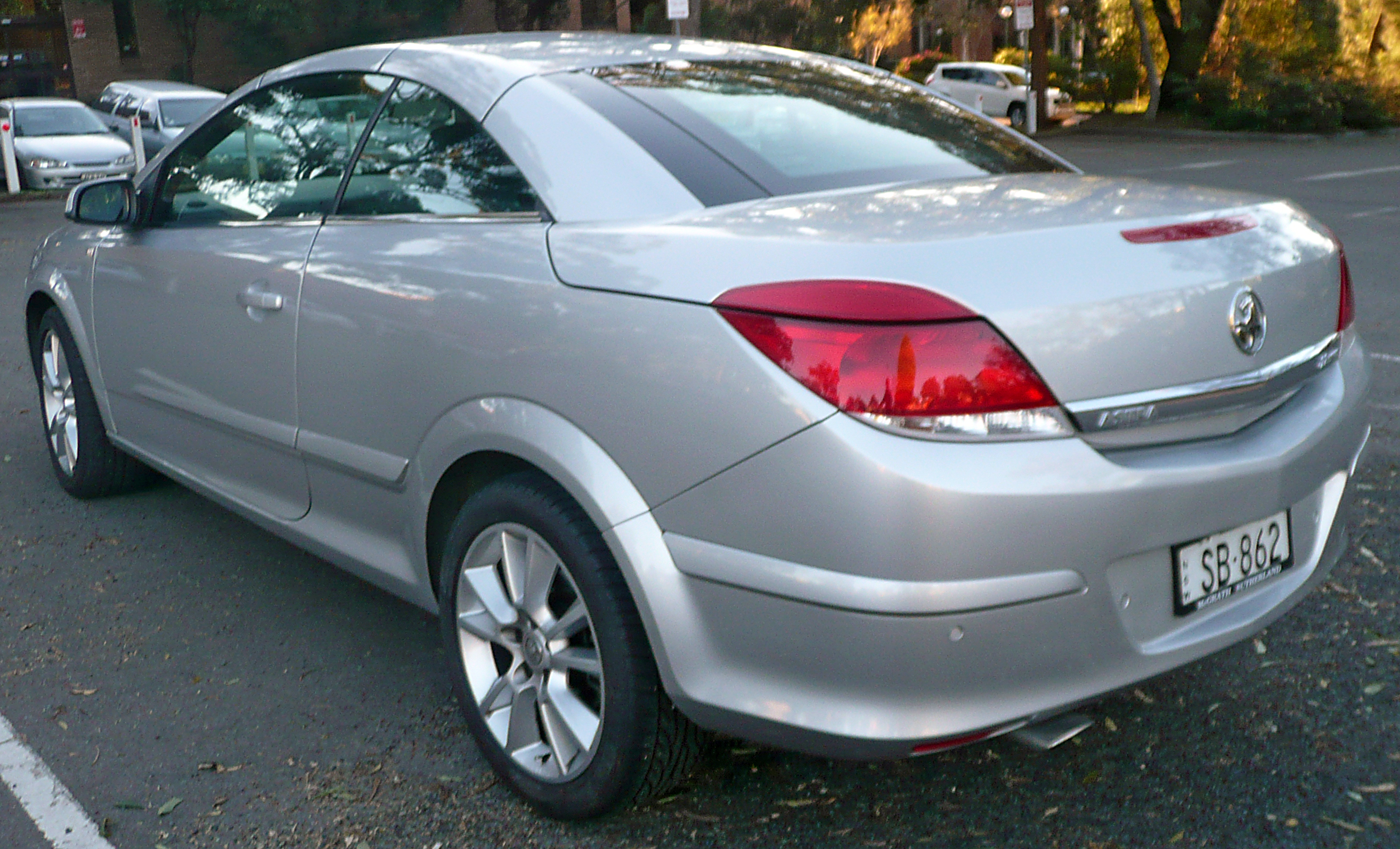
- 2006-2009 Astra Twin Top convertible
  MY06.5: Quality control related revisions from June 2006 added head-protecting side curtain airbags as standard equipment for the CDX. Also released was the turbodiesel hatchback, badged CDTi. Two versions of the diesel were offered: a 1.9-litre version with 110 kilowatts (150 hp) teamed with a six-speed manual transmission known as the Z19DTH, and a six-speed automatic model with the Z19DT, producing 88 kilowatts (118 hp). This was a first for the Astra in Australia, but not New Zealand where the Astra TS had previously been offered with a 1.7-litre turbodiesel. Acceleration was fair to average, but fuel economy was improved over the outgoing model. Astra CD and CDX models received front fog lamps, previously only found on the CDXi.
- MY07: models appeared in January 2007, coinciding with the release of the Astra SRi and Twin Top convertible. Both releases came with a more powerful 2.2-litre Z22YH petrol engine producing 110 kilowatts (150 hp), available with the six-speed manual or four-speed automatic.
- MY07.5: in April 2007 the Astra line-up received a facelift including a tweaked front grille which added a V-shaped centre in the chrome strip which was also shared by its UK Vauxhall equivalent, lights on all models, new 16 inch alloy design for CDX and CDTi models, and black tinted headlamps for sport variants. The 1.8-litre petrol engine also benefited from an upgrade to Z18XER with a power upgrade from 90 kilowatts (120 hp) to 103 kilowatts (138 hp). The 2.2-litre engines available in the SRi, and Twin Top remained the same, as did the 2.0-litre turbo in the Astra SRi Turbo.
- MY08: changes from October 2007 saw the deletion of the five-door SRi, leaving only the SRi coupé, and the Twin Top with the 2.2-litre engine.
- MY08.5: minor, non-cosmetic update from May 2008 onwards. MY08.5 Astras received electronic stability control (ESC) as standard fitment across the entire lineup. ESC was previously limited to SRi and CDTi variants. This series also marked the return of the five-door SRi, although it was now standard with the 1.8 – as opposed to the 2.2-litre petrol engine previously fitted. This engine change also affected the coupé SRi variant, but not the Twin Top. The Astra wagon range was also expanded to include the diesel engine option available already on the hatchback. Although only offered with an automatic transmission, the diesel CDTi wagon marked the return of the Astra wagon to the New Zealand market after its discontinuation after the TS series. 16" wheels became standard equipment on base model Astras.
- MY09: The CD and CDX hatchback and station wagon variants reverted to the black bezel projector-style headlamps. In addition, base model Astras received black B pillars.

=== Specification levels ===
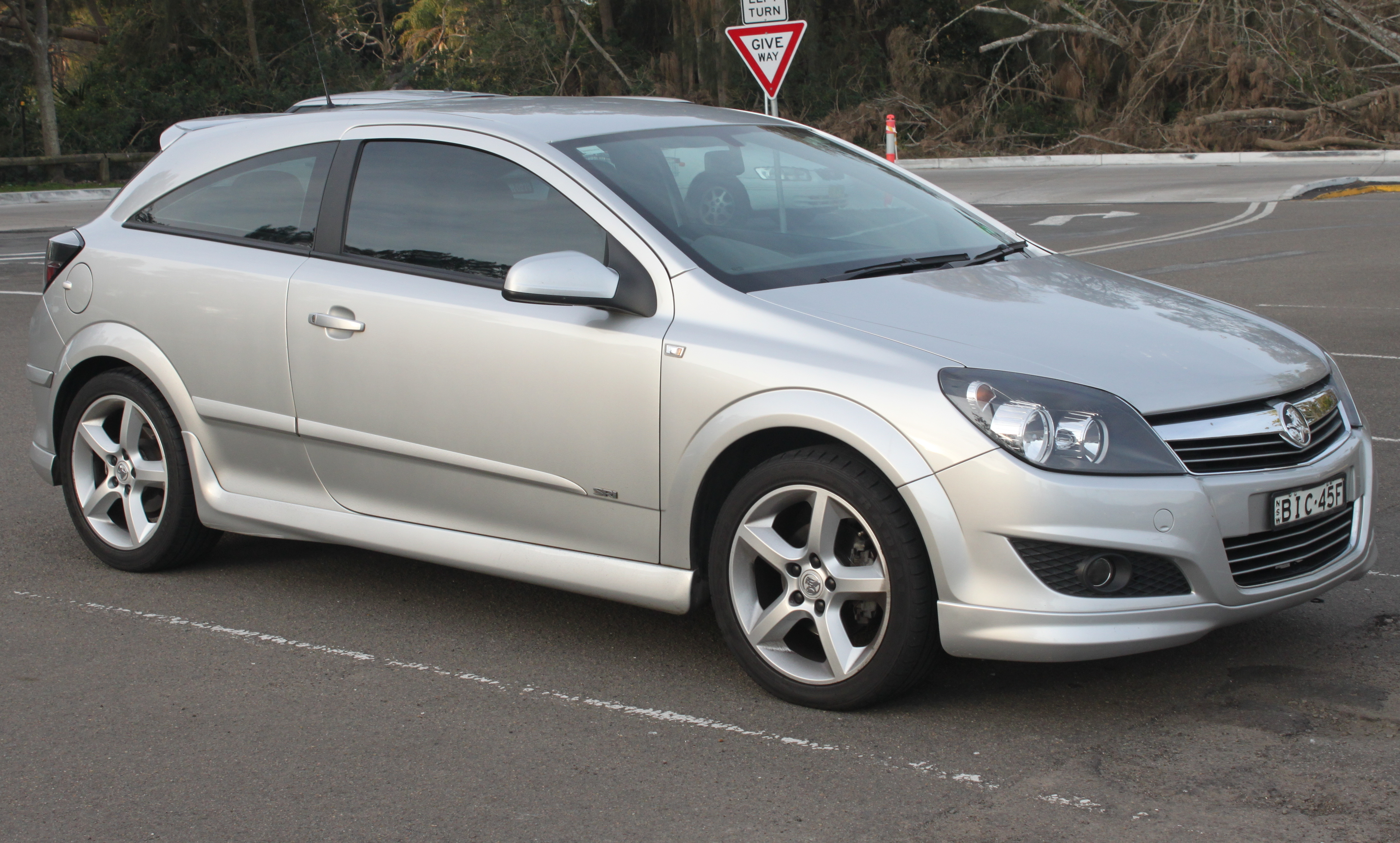

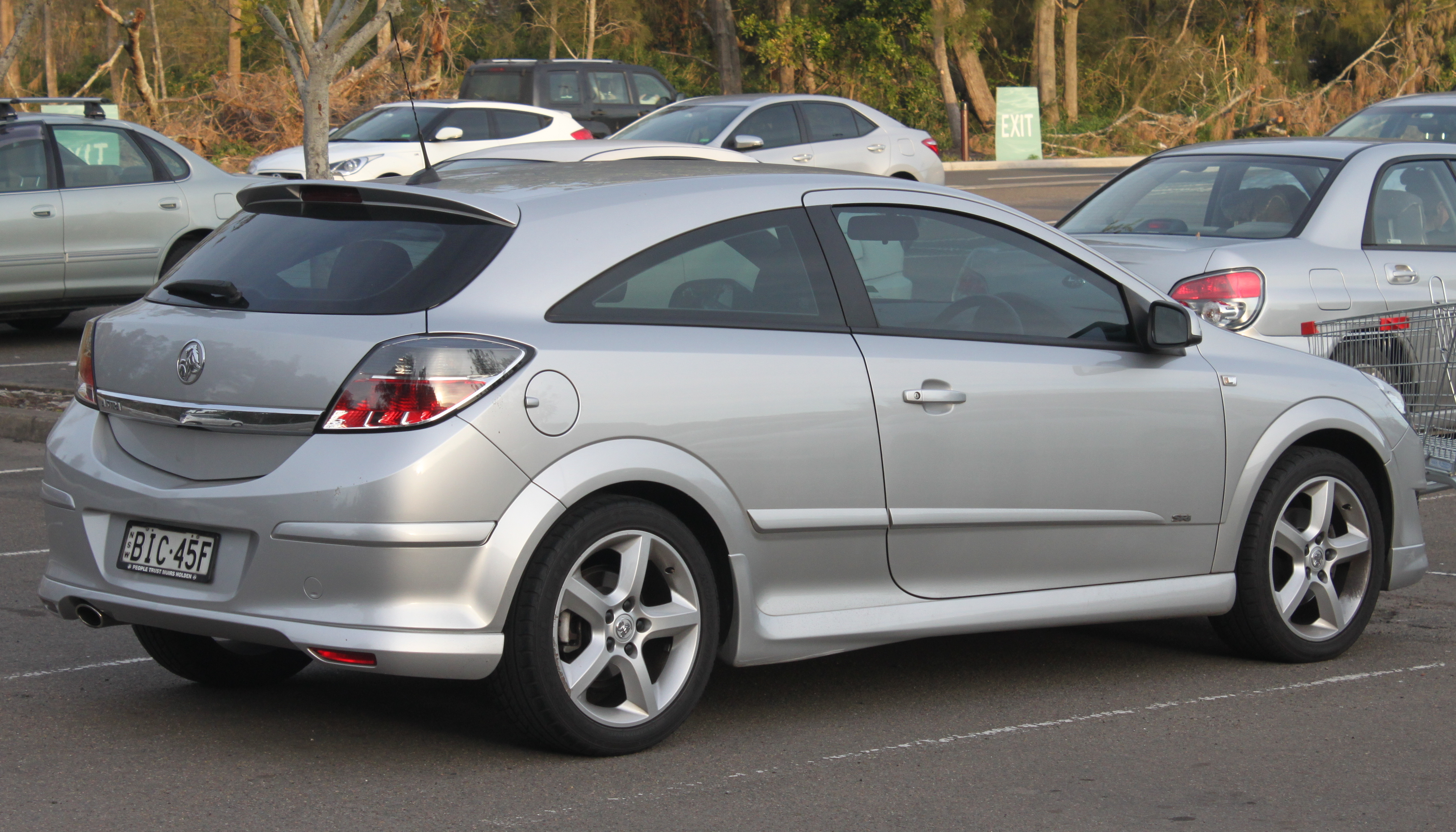
Holden Astra SRi 3-door

- CD: was the base model with the smaller Z18XE engine (later the Z18XER)
- CDX: added 16 inch alloy wheels.
- CDXi: versions added adjustable front seats, air conditioning and curtain airbags. Discontinued after MY06.
- CDTi: diesel-powered version of the CDX.
- SRi: was the sport model of the AH series Astra, equipped with leather seats, climate control and 17-inch alloy wheels.
- SRi Turbo: was the larger 2.0-litre Z20LER engine.

Special editions

- 60th Anniversary: editions were introduced to commemorate the 60th anniversary since the first Holden, the 48-215 which the Astra was styled after. 60th Anniversary models included 15-inch alloy wheels and steering wheel radio controls.
- CD Equipe: These models gained the 15-inch alloy wheels, and rear power windows at no extra cost during 2006 and 2007.

=== HSV VXR Turbo ===
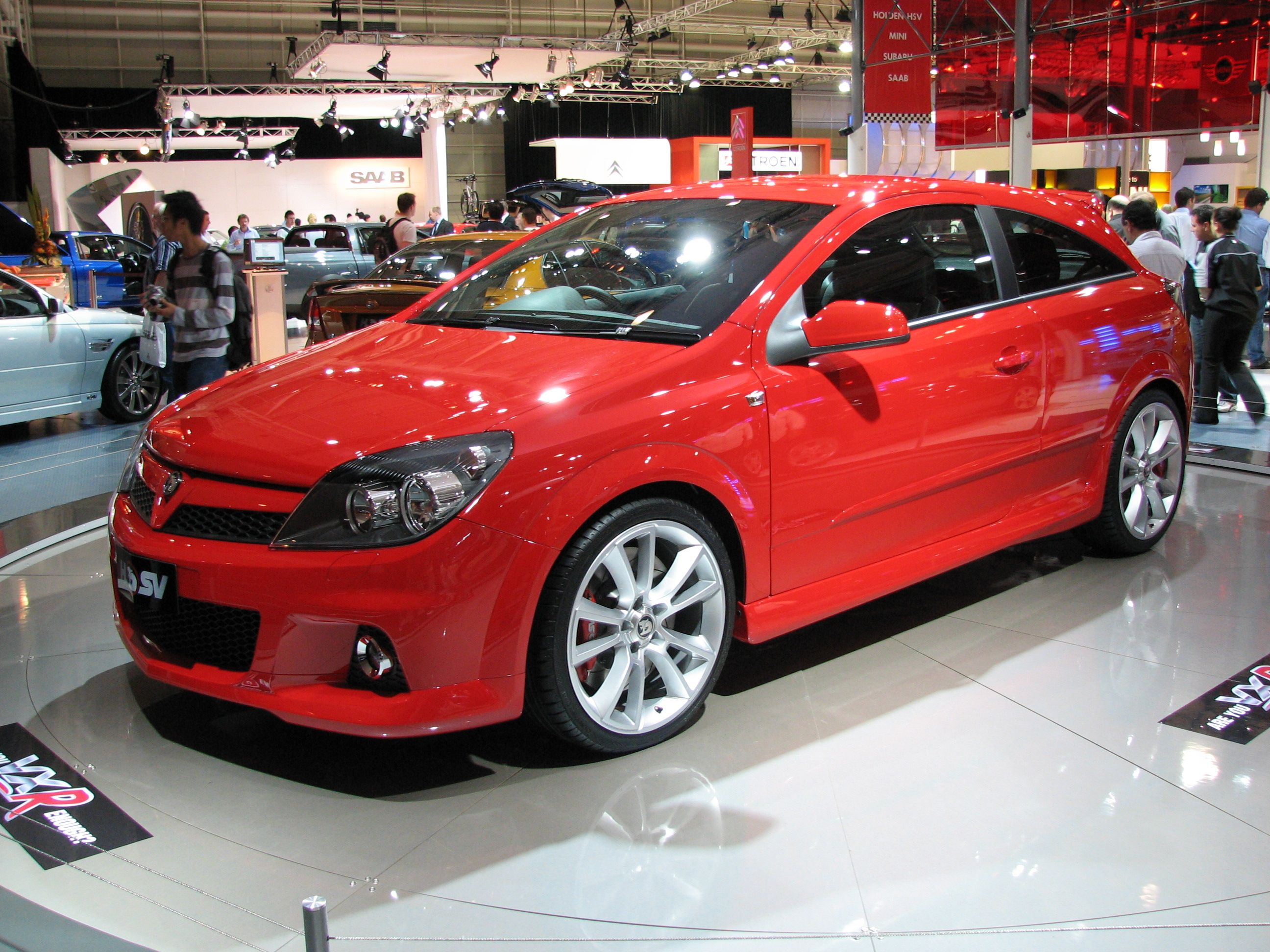
HSV VXR Turbo

The Opel Astra OPC (with Vauxhall's V-grille and VXR badge) was marketed in Australia as the HSV VXR Turbo by Holden Special Vehicles from 2006 to 2009, fitted with the 177 kW (236 hp) Z20LEH engine. In July 2008, HSV released a "Nürburgring" special edition.

A HSV VXR Turbo driven by Dutchman Ivo Breukers and Australians Morgan Haber and Damian Ward, won Class E for "Production (Performance)" cars at the 2013 Liqui Moly 12 Hour in Australia on 10 February. The trio finished 18th outright and covered 229 laps of the 6.213 km (3.861 mi) Mount Panorama Circuit, a total distance of 1,422.77 km (884 mi).

=== Safety ===
ANCAP test results* Holden Astra CDXi 5 door hatch (2004)
| Test | Score |
|---|---|
| Overall | 5 /5 stars |
| Frontal offset | 13.67/16 |
| Side impact | 15.87/16 |
| Pole | 2/2 |
| Seat belt reminders | 2/3 |
| Whiplash protection | Not Assessed |
| Pedestrian protection | Poor |
| Electronic stability control | Not Assessed |

ANCAP test results* Holden Astra CD hatch variants (2008)
| Test | Score |
|---|---|
| Overall | 4 /5 stars |
| Frontal offset | 13.67/16 |
| Side impact | 15.87/16 |
| Pole | Not Assessed |
| Seat belt reminders | 2/3 |
| Whiplash protection | Not Assessed |
| Pedestrian protection | Poor |
| Electronic stability control | Standard |

ANCAP test results* Holden Astra CDX, SRi & CDTI hatches (2008)
| Test | Score |
|---|---|
| Overall | 5 /5 stars |
| Frontal offset | 13.67/16 |
| Side impact | 15.87/16 |
| Pole | 2/2 |
| Seat belt reminders | 2/3 |
| Whiplash protection | Not Assessed |
| Pedestrian protection | Poor |
| Electronic stability control | Standard |

== Sixth generation (PJ; 2015) ==
Sixth generation (PJ)
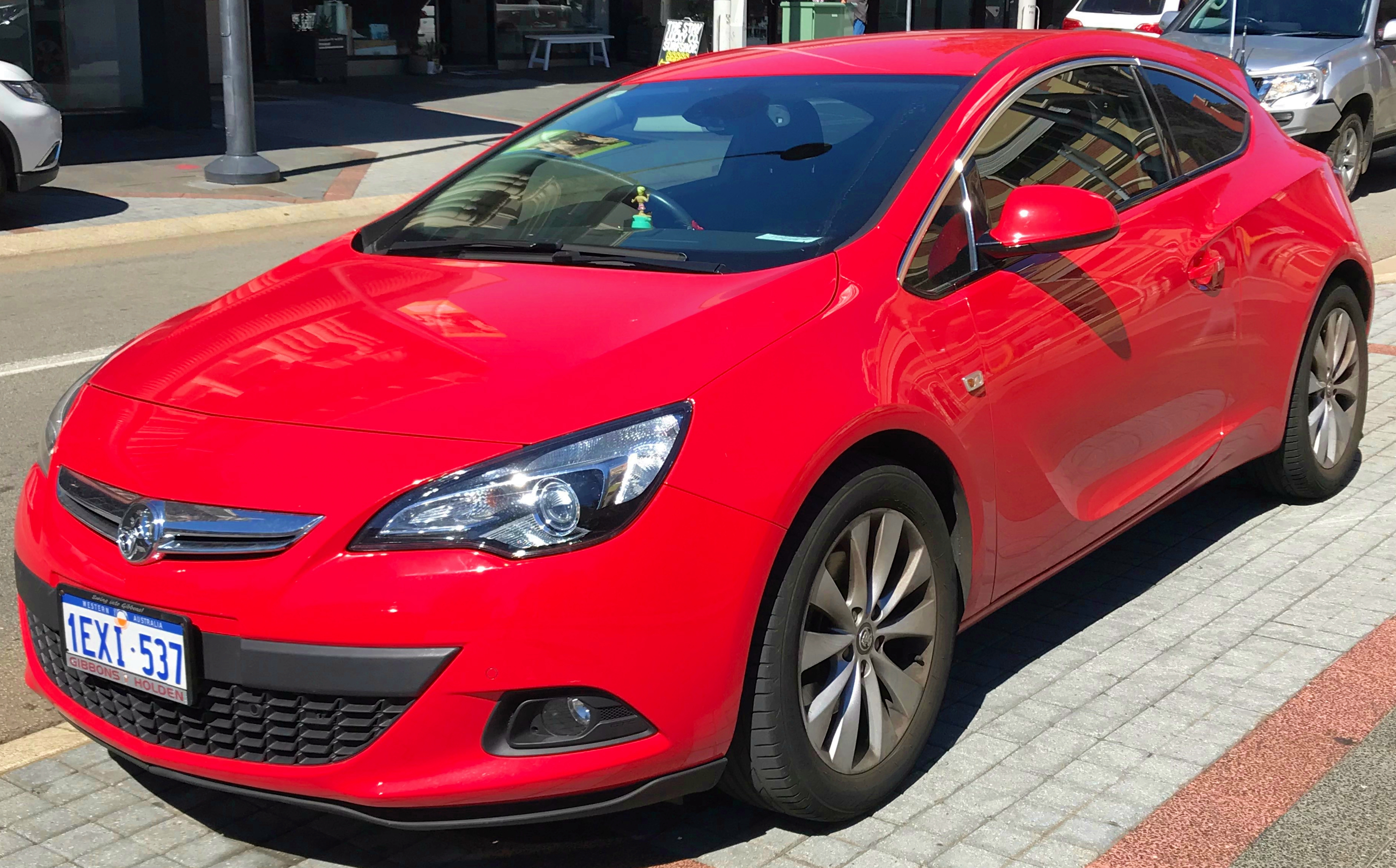
- Holden Astra GTC (PJ)

Overview
- Also called: Opel Astra; Vauxhall Astra; Buick Excelle (XT)
- Production: 2015–2016
- Assembly: Poland: Gliwice
- Designer: Uwe Müller

Body and chassis
- Body style: 3-door Hatchback
- Platform: Delta II platform
- Related: Buick Verano; Cadillac ELR; Holden Cruze; Holden Volt; Holden Cascada; Opel Zafira Tourer

Dimensions
- Wheelbase: 2,675 mm (105.3 in)
- Length: 4,466 mm (175.8 in)
- Width: 2,020 mm (79.5 in)
- Height: 1,482 mm (58.3 in)

Chronology
- Predecessor: Holden Cruze hatchback Opel Astra GTC

The sixth generation Astra is based on General Motors' Delta II platform and went on sale in 2015. The same car, as the Opel Astra, was part of a failed attempt by Opel to establish itself in Australia between 2012 and 2013.

The Holden Astra PJ range included the Astra GTC, GTC Sport and VXR three-door hatchbacks, sold at significant lower prices than the preceding Opel models. The VXR featured a turbocharged 2.0 L direct injection engine with a power of 206 kW (280 PS; 276 hp) and torque of 400 N⋅m (300 lb⋅ft).

=== Safety ===
ANCAP test results* Holden Astra GTC, GTC Sport & VXR variants (2013)
| Test | Score |
|---|---|
| Overall | 5 /5 stars |
| Frontal offset | 15.07/16 |
| Side impact | 14.29/16 |
| Pole | 2/2 |
| Seat belt reminders | 2/3 |
| Whiplash protection | Good |
| Pedestrian protection | Marginal |
| Electronic stability control | Standard |

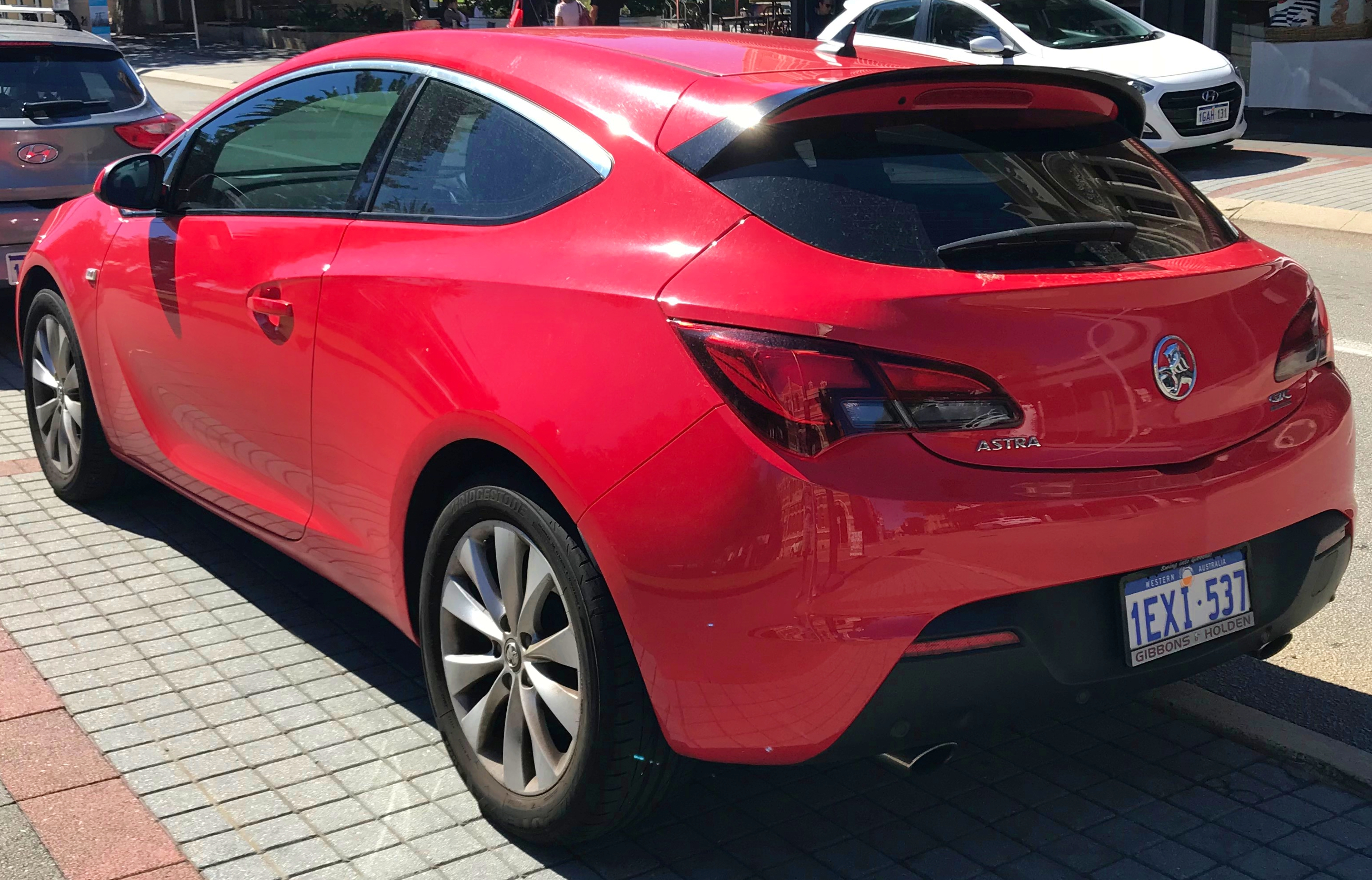
Holden Astra GTC (PJ)

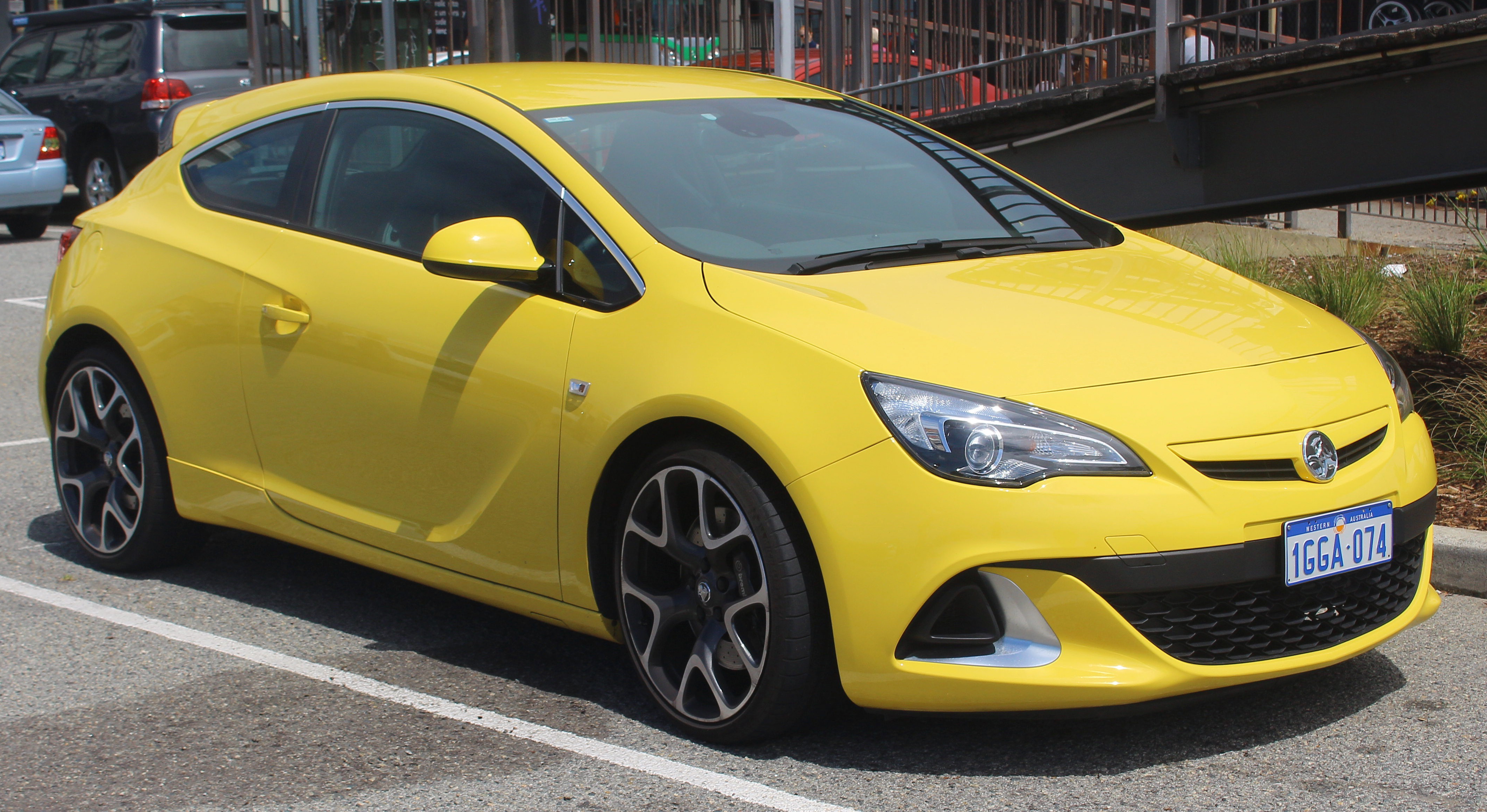
Holden Astra VXR (PJ)

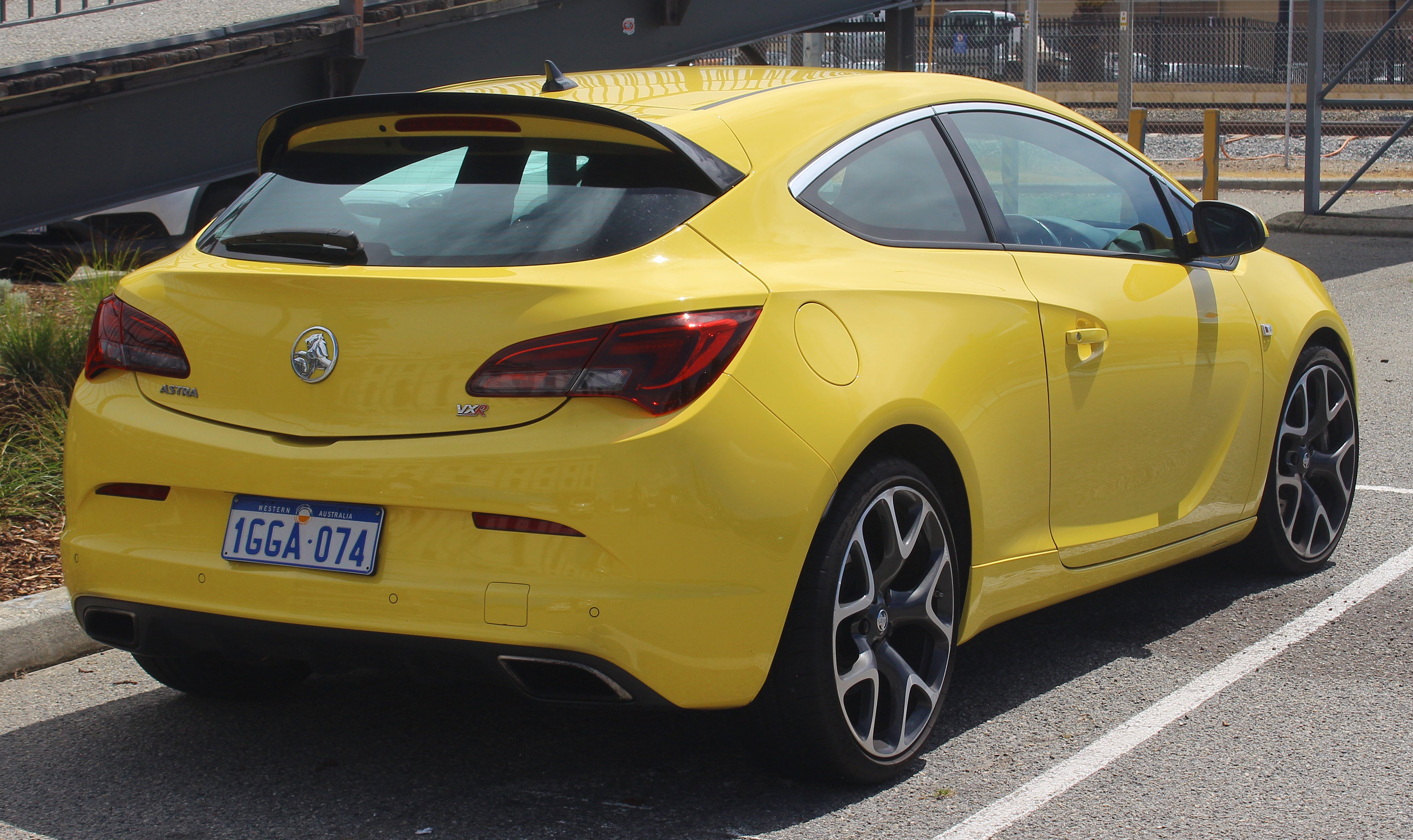
Holden Astra VXR (PJ)

== Seventh generation (BK, BL; 2016) ==
Seventh generation (BK, BL)
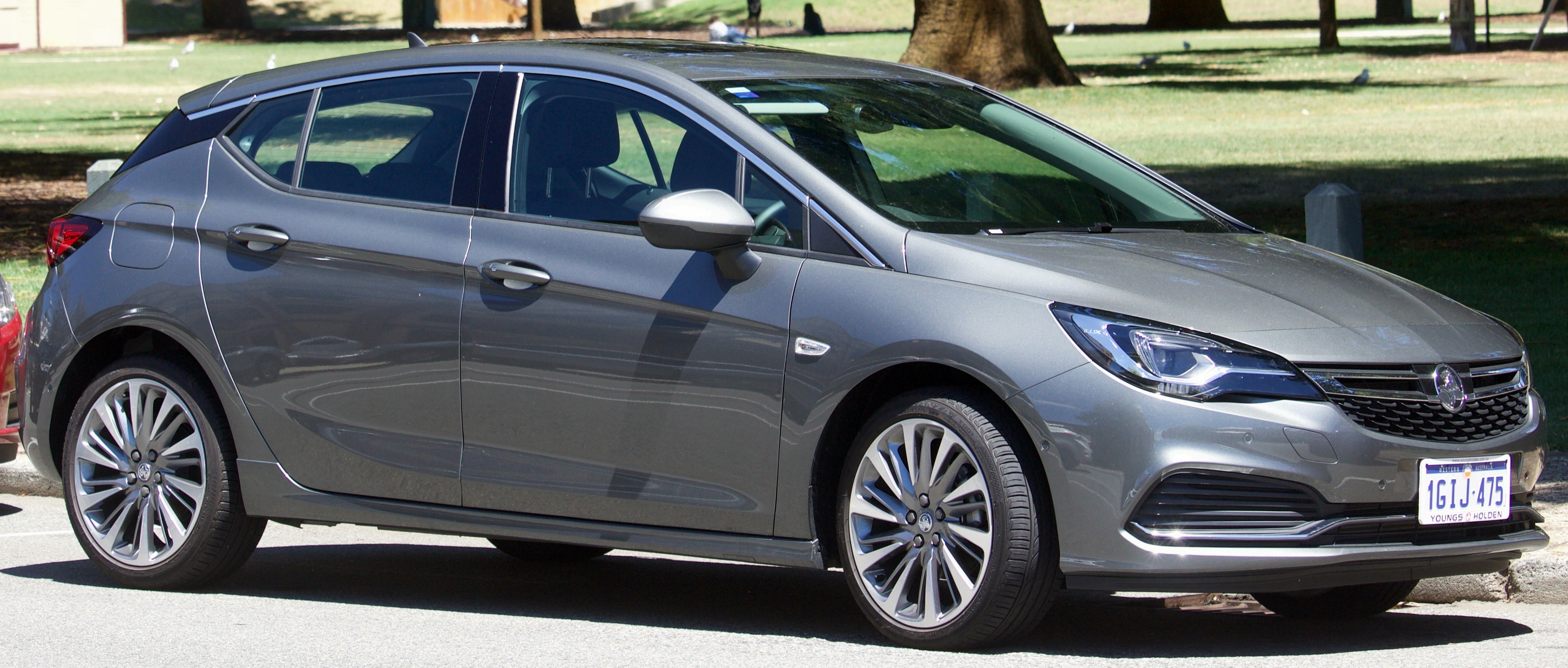

Overview
- Also called: Opel Astra; Vauxhall Astra; Chevrolet Cruze (sedan); Buick Verano GS
- Production: 2016–2020
- Assembly: Poland: Gliwice (hatchback); South Korea: Gunsan, Jeonbuk (sedan); Ellesmere Port, United Kingdom (Vauxhall Ellesmere Port) (wagon)
- Designer: Jeasoo Kim (hatchback and station wagons); Stuart Cooper (sedan)

Body and chassis
- Body style: 4-door sedan 5-door hatchback 5-door station wagon

Powertrain
- Engine: 1.4 L GM SGE turbo I4; 1.6 L GM MGE turbo I4
- Transmission: 6-speed manual 6-speed automatic

Chronology
- Predecessor: Holden Cruze (sedan)
- Successor: Peugeot 308 III

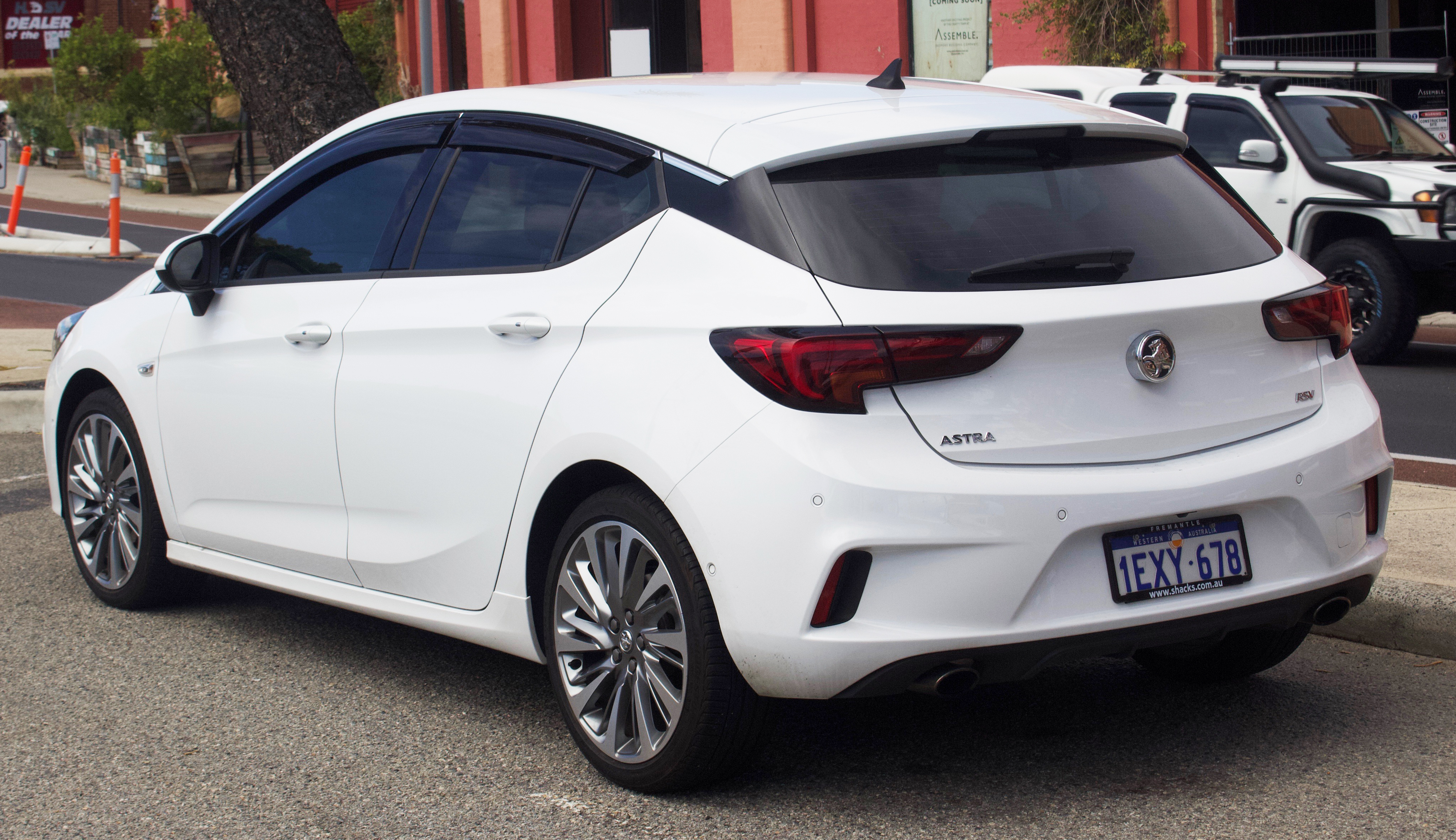
Holden Astra RSV hatchback (BK)

Holden announced in early 2015 that the fifth-generation Opel Astra will be sold in Australia, from 2016 with the Holden Cruze's future uncertain. In late 2015, Holden announced that the Astra and second-generation Cruze will be sold alongside each other. In January 2017 it was revealed that both the Astra and Cruze would be sold together under the Astra nameplate, with Holden taking only the hatch variant of the Opel Astra as the "new Astra hatch," and the second-generation Cruze sedan imported as the "new Astra sedan." The Chevrolet Cruze hatch would not be imported by Holden, while the Opel Astra sedan was discontinued starting from the Astra K generation.

The new BK Astra hatch went on sale in December 2016 with three models forming the lineup: R, RS and RS-V. Holden had later added an R+ grade which includes the autonomous safety pack. Only a six-speed manual was available from launch on the 1.6-litre turbo models, with the automatic becoming available in March 2017. A wagon variant of the Astra hatch launched in October 2017, available in LS+ and LT trims, with an exclusive 1.4-litre turbo engine mated to a six-speed automatic transmission. Unlike the Astra hatch and sedan which are produced in Poland and South Korea respectively, the Astra Wagon is produced at Vauxhall's Ellesmere Port manufacturing facility in the UK.

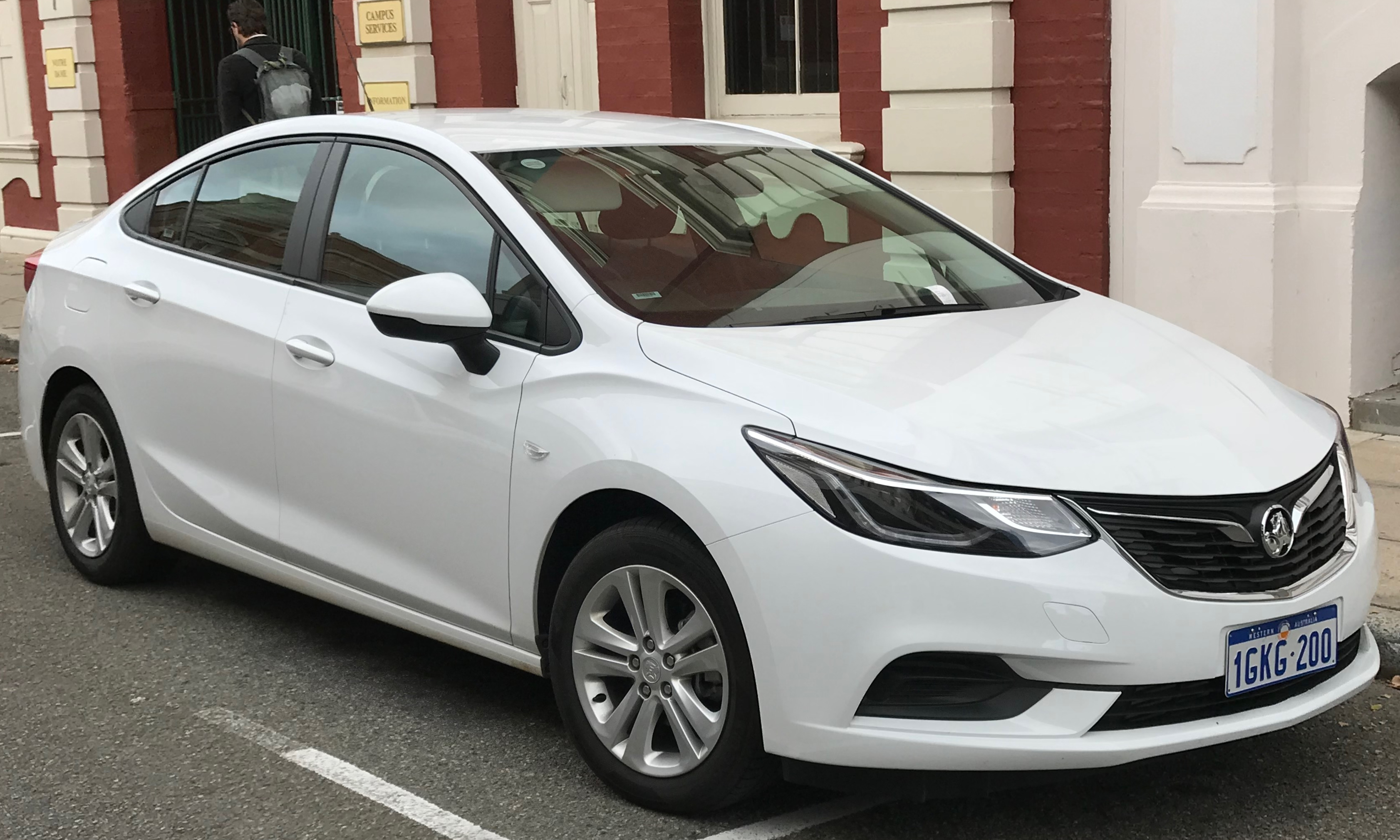

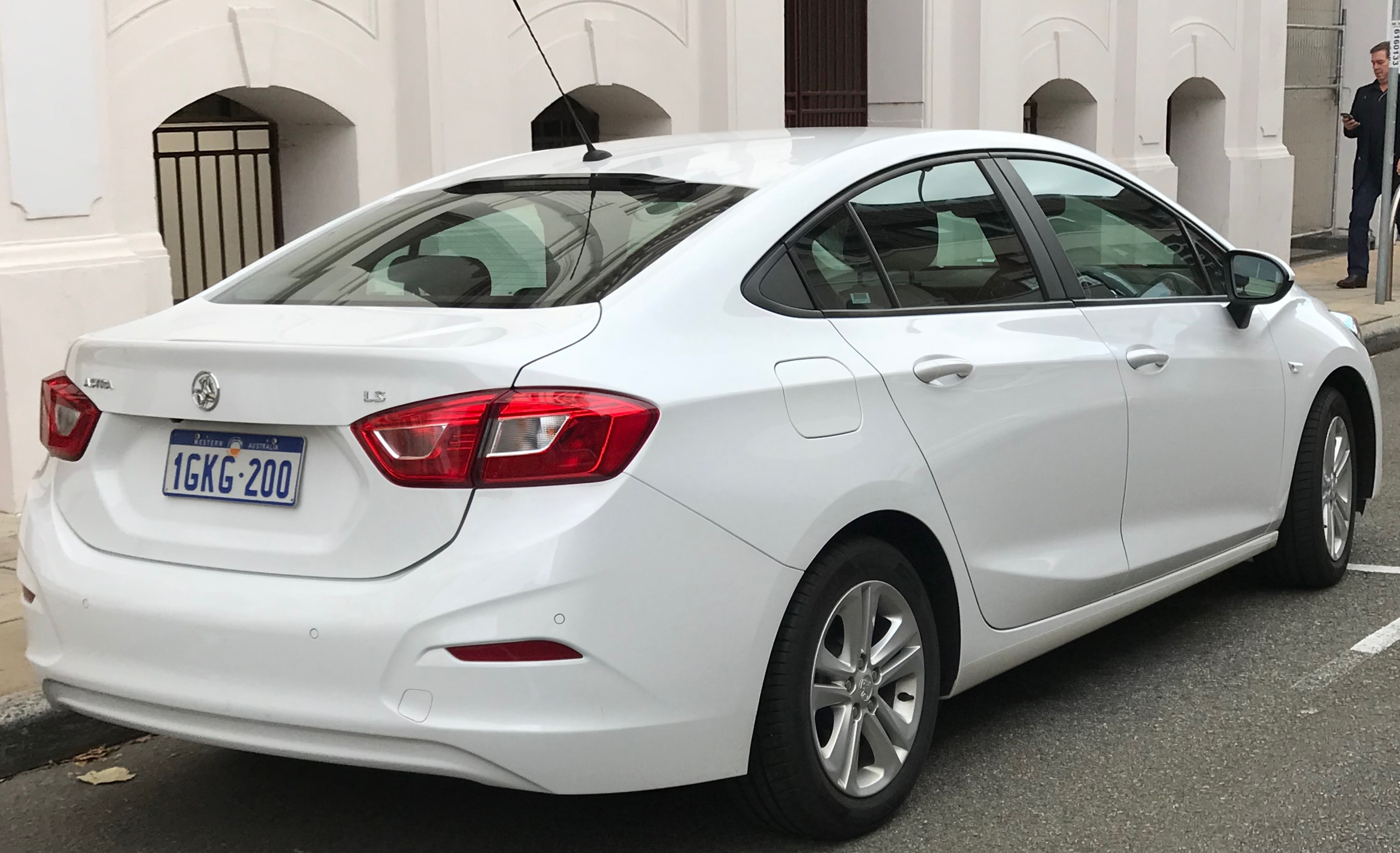
Holden Astra LS sedan (BL)

The new Cruze-based BL Astra sedan was released in June 2017 with four models forming the lineup, but instead being referred to as LS, LS+, LT and LTZ. Whilst the Astra hatch is available with either 1.4-litre turbo or 1.6-litre turbo engines, the Astra sedan is only available with the 1.4-litre turbo, and the six-speed manual is limited to the base LS model, with all other models having a standard six-speed automatic transmission.

In 2017, Holden released a station wagon to complement the BK Astra hatchback. It was based on the Vauxhall Astra sportwagon sold in the United Kingdom.

On 10 December 2019, Holden announced it would be discontinuing the Astra, (and Commodore), nameplates. They cited a lack of sales drive in each of the respective categories, turning instead to develop their SUV and Ute range.

In late 2019, despite the announcement that Holden would be exiting the market in 2020, the MY20 Astra facelift was announced. For MY20 changes included a revised from bumper and grille, new alloy wheel designs, updated infotainment system, wireless phone charging and a digital instrument cluster. Along with refreshed upholstery and interior trims, a new colour Nautic Blue was added across the range. However, the LED matrix lights offered as an option on pre-facelift cars is no longer available. Instead a static LED headlight is offered as standard on R, RS and RS-V.

=== Safety ===
ANCAP test results* Holden Astra Sportwagon variants (2015, aligned with Euro NCAP)
| Test | Points | % |
|---|---|---|
| Overall: | 5 /5 stars | |
| Adult occupant: | 32.8 | 86% |
| Child occupant: | 41.2 | 84% |
| Pedestrian: | 30 | 83% |
| Safety assist: | 9.8 | 75% |

ANCAP test results* Holden Astra R+, RS and RS-V hatch variants (2015, aligned with Euro NCAP)
| Test | Points | % |
|---|---|---|
| Overall: | 5 /5 stars | |
| Adult occupant: | 32.8 | 86% |
| Child occupant: | 41.2 | 84% |
| Pedestrian: | 30 | 83% |
| Safety assist: | 9.8 | 75% |

ANCAP test results* Holden Astra all hatch variants (2015, aligned with Euro NCAP)
| Test | Points | % |
|---|---|---|
| Overall: | 5 /5 stars | |
| Adult occupant: | 32.8 | 86% |
| Child occupant: | 41.2 | 84% |
| Pedestrian: | 30 | 83% |
| Safety assist: | 9.8 | 75% |

ANCAP test results* Holden Astra all sedan variants (2017)
| Test | Score |
|---|---|
| Overall | 5 /5 stars |
| Frontal offset | 13.94/16 |
| Side impact | 16/16 |
| Pole | 2/2 |
| Seat belt reminders | 3/3 |
| Whiplash protection | Good |
| Pedestrian protection | Marginal |
| Electronic stability control | Standard |

=== Sales ===
Sales of the BK Astra commenced in November 2016. Initially being a slow seller, with a manual transmission hatchback being the only model, sales picked up with the 2017 introduction of an automatic transmission, as well as sedan and wagon variants. As of June 2018, Holden announced that the best-selling Astra Sedan variant sales would be ended due to supply issues from the GM Korea's Gunsan manufacturing plant, and the Astra Wagon variant sales was to be ended due to slow sales. Both variants remained listed on Holden's website until remaining inventory sold out and discontinued entirely.

| | Jan | Feb | Mar | Apr | May | Jun | Jul | Aug | Sep | Oct | Nov | Dec | Year | Total |
|---|---|---|---|---|---|---|---|---|---|---|---|---|---|---|
| 2016 | —N/a | | | | | | | | | | 294 | 154 | 448 | 29,497 |
| 2017 | 418 | 398 | 719 | 792 | 828 | 1,580 | 1,125 | 831 | 801 | 1,031 | 1,480 | 3,532 | 13,535 | 29,497 |
| 2018 | 813 | 1,008 | 906 | 497 | 423 | 851 | 588 | 571 | 1,049 | 1,103 | 1,000 | 1,067 | 9,876 | 29,497 |
| 2019 | 1,071 | 774 | 440 | 212 | 379 | 219 | 157 | 378 | 141 | 105 | 171 | 141 | 4,188 | 29,497 |
| 2020 | 121 | 63 | 596 | 112 | 140 | 112 | 61 | 21 | 12 | 4 | 12 | | 1,254 | 29,497 |

== Motorsport ==
Kelly Racing competed in the 2019 TCR Australia Touring Car Series with two Holden Astras driven by Chelsea Angelo and Alex Rullo.

== Sales ==
| | Sales | Generation | |
|---|---|---|---|
| 1998 | 3,981 | TS | |
| 1999 | 8,090 | TS | |
| 2000 | 18,439 | TS | |
| 2001 | 28,450 | TS | |
| 2002 | 27,388 | TS | |
| 2003 | 26,139 | TS | |
| 2004 | 24,699 | TS | AH |
| 2005 | 33,070 | TS | AH |
| 2006 | 19,681 | | AH |
| 2007 | 17,975 | | AH |
| 2008 | 15,784 | | AH |
| 2009 | 6,618 | | AH |
| 2010 | 23 | | AH |
| 2011 | N/A | | |
| 2012 | N/A | | |
| 2013 | N/A | | |
| 2014 | N/A | | |
