= Mudflap (disambiguation) =

A mudflap is an accessory on wheel wells of a motor vehicle.

Mudflap may also refer to:

- Mudflap (Transformers), several fictional robot superhero characters in the Transformers robot superhero franchise.
- Mudflap, a version of the Nike Zeus anti-satellite weapon
- Mudflap, a tool for detecting dangling pointers
- Fender (vehicle), American English term for the part of a vehicle body that frames a wheel well

== See also ==
- Mudflap girl, an iconic symbol appearing on many vehicle mud flaps
- Fender (vehicle), known in the UK as a mudguard
- Splash guard (disambiguation)
