= Splash guard =

Splash guard may refer to:

- An attachment to a snorkel
- Mudflap, on a vehicle
- Face shield, on a helmet
- Splatter guard, on cookware
- Shower splash guard
- Any of various devices (such as a dyke/levee) used in construction to prevent/reduce splash damage

== See also ==
- Guard (disambiguation)
- Splash (disambiguation)
