= Toyota Camry (XV10) =

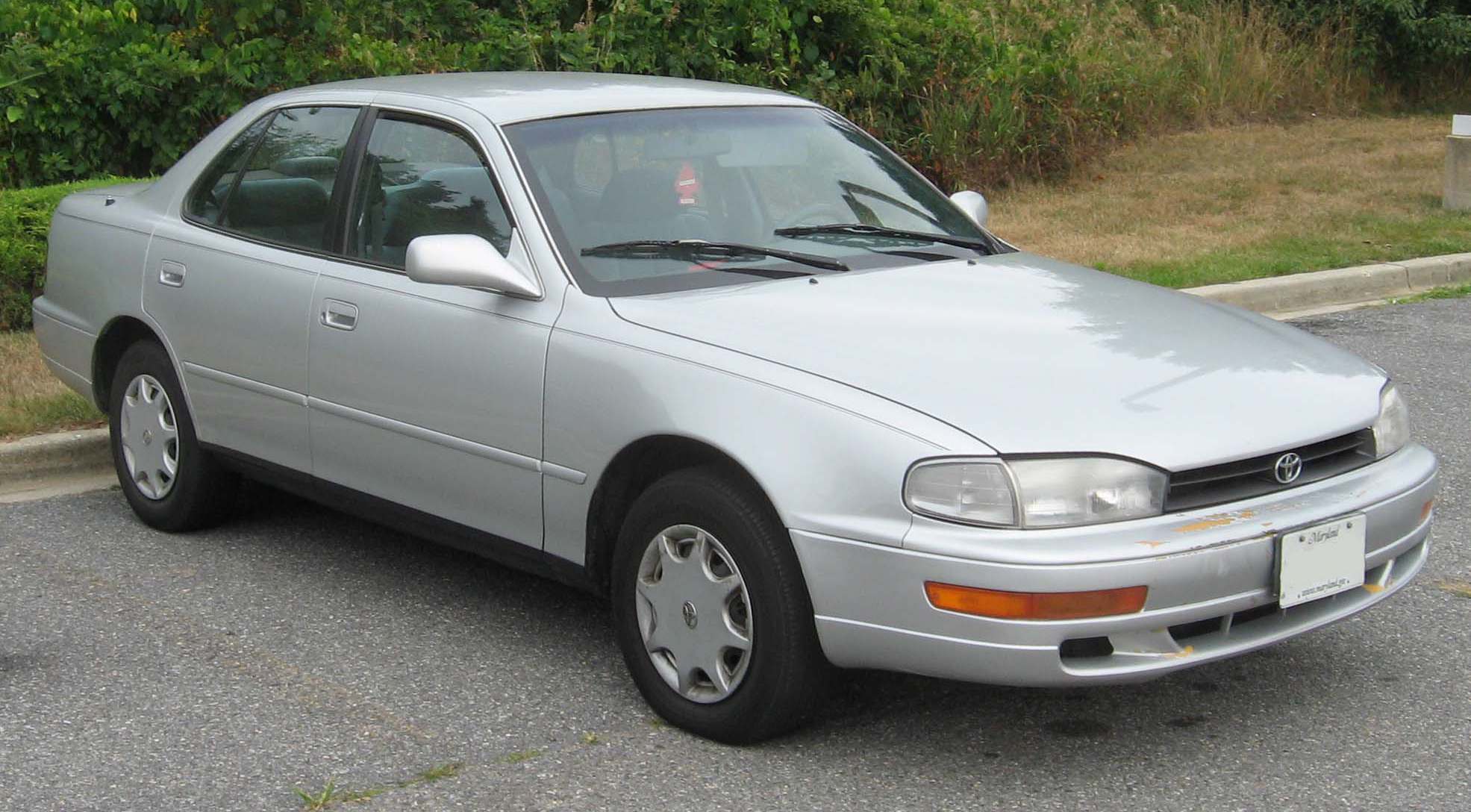
- 1992–1994 Toyota Camry sedan (US)

Overview
- Manufacturer: Toyota
- Also called: Toyota Scepter (Japan); Toyota Vienta; Toyota Camry 300i (South Africa, 3.0 L models only); Holden Apollo; Xinkai HXK6630 (China: rebadged import)
- Production: September 1991 – August 1996 (US); November 1991 – July 1996 (Japan); 1991–1994 (China); September 1992 – October 2002 (South Africa); December 1992 – July 1997 (Australia); October 1993 – February 1997 (Thailand)
- Model years: 1992–1996
- Assembly: Japan: Toyota City, Aichi (Tsutsumi plant); Australia: Port Melbourne (1993–1994); Altona (1994–1997): (Toyota Australia); China: Zhanjiang, Guangdong; South Africa: Durban; United States: Georgetown, Kentucky
- Designer: Osamu Shikado (1988); Tadahiro Kobayashi (Facelift: 1993)

Body and chassis
- Class: Mid-size car
- Body style: 2-door coupé; 4-door sedan; 4-door station wagon
- Layout: Front-engine, front-wheel drive
- Related: Lexus ES/Toyota Windom (XV10); Toyota Avalon (XX10)

Powertrain
- Engine: 2.2 L 5S-FE I4; 3.0 L 3VZ-FE V6; 3.0 L 1MZ-FE V6
- Transmission: 5-speed E53 manual; 5-speed S51 manual; 4-speed A140E automatic; 4-speed A540E automatic; 4-speed A541E automatic

Dimensions
- Wheelbase: 2,620 mm (103.1 in)
- Length: Sedan: 4,780 mm (188.2 in); Station wagon: 4,811 mm (189.4 in)
- Width: 1,770 mm (69.7 in)
- Height: Coupé: 1,394 mm (54.9 in); Sedan: 1,410 mm (55.5 in); Station wagon: 1,430 mm (56.3 in)

Chronology
- Predecessor: Toyota Camry (V20); Toyota Cressida (X80) (Australia, for Vienta)
- Successor: Toyota Camry (XV20) (sedan and wagon); Toyota Camry Solara (coupe)

The Toyota Camry (XV10) is a mid-size car that was produced by Toyota between 1991 and 1996 in Japan and North America, and 1993 and 1997 in Australia. The XV10 series represented the third generation of the Toyota Camry in all markets outside Japan, which followed a different generational lineage. The XV10 Camry range is split into different model codes indicative of the engine. Four-cylinder models use the SXV10/SDV10 codes, with VCV10 designating the six-cylinder versions, and MCV10 the later six-cylinder cars in North America only.

In its home market of Japan, the XV10 Camry iteration was known as the Toyota Scepter. The previous series of narrow body compact-sized cars continued on using the Camry name in Japan. Both sized cars were available at Toyota Corolla Store dealers.

In Australia, the third generation Camry was sold under three names. Along with the Camry itself, a version badged as the Holden Apollo was also sold as a result of a model sharing arrangement between GM Holden and Toyota at the time. Toyota from 1995 onwards, also began badging the six-cylinder versions of the Camry as the Toyota Vienta in the Australian-market.

Exports from Australia to Thailand commenced in August 1993; Middle Eastern models began export from Australia in February 1996.

== Development ==
The SXV10's smooth and curvaceous shape, lacking of any hard angles seen on previous Camry models, was not what Toyota product planners originally envisioned for the car. In typical style of Japanese designers and engineers of the time, the concept of the SXV10 originally presented by Japanese executives would be an angular sedan, with a fairly narrow body, which would bear a strong resemblance in design to the V20 it was set to replace. However, it would be up-scaled to a mid-size classification. The concept would look much like the MX83 Cressida, but feature a FWD platform with a transverse mounted engine.

However, Dave Illingworth, Lexus' first general manager, had expressed genuine anxiety and concerns that the Lexus ES250 (which was designed to provide a stable mate to the UCF10 Lexus LS) would not be well perceived. Similarly, the ES250 later had difficulty appealing to customers in Lexus showrooms against the LS400, which had set standards that revolutionized the entire industry. Accordingly, executives of Toyota's North American division in Torrance, California, argued that the SXV10 Camry should be completely redesigned and that the engineering be updated and modified to better suit American tastes. Toyota's headquarters at the time in Torrance was in close proximity to Laguna Beach and Orange County, where the LS400 was conceived. American Toyota executives in Los Angeles including Jim Press, Robert McCurry, Chris Hostetter, and Dave Illingworth all argued that American landscapes, even in a metropolis setting like Los Angeles, had wider roads, big lawns and landscapes, and thus cars needed a different appearance to appeal to American tastes. McCurry also argued that Americans typically travel longer distances on highways, and so a smooth quiet ride and a wide spacious cabin were important. The Japanese executives in Toyoda City reluctantly agreed, and within a few weeks, Osamu Shikado would pen the design for the new concept, which, as McCurry had argued, needed to resemble the curved shape of the Lexus LS400, particularly in the roofline and flush, curved windows, which also aided to reduce wind noise.

The SXV10 Camry was developed after the ES300, which only featured the 3.0 Liter V6 option. The 4 cylinder option in the Camry was the 5S-FE. Insulation in the firewall, fluid-filled engine sub-mounts and cradling, as well as hydraulic fan technology were shared between the ES300 and Camry. Other developments pioneered for the LS400 such as sandwiching layers of asphalt resin composites and sheets of steel were carried into the SXV10 platform, contributing to a quiet, isolated cabin. Particular areas of challenge in engineering was that the Japanese-variant was several inches narrower, and the entire cradle had to be re-designed and widened. Additionally, CMM requirements were challenging in achieving high levels of accuracy and lack of deviation in the gap between the curved hood and the curved headlamp housings, where the LS400 featured rectangular lamps that were more traditional. Toyota also felt it was important to blend the bumper into the metal fenders with minimal gaps and differentiation in visual cohesion. Engineers also adopted many influences from the LS400 and Lexus ES300 such as alloy lattices and metallurgical eutectic techniques that led to engines with low thermal expansion coefficient, better fuel atomization, rust corrosion, and flusher body panels. The development of reducing NVH levels in the cabin was the result of hundreds of engineers, which was revealed by Chris Goffey during a Top Gear review.

Such high levels of over-engineering was a point of disagreement in product development philosophies within Toyota; where many believed that the vehicle should have been developed closely with the new Lexus brand to help establish the new nameplate and develop buyer interest into upgrading to a Lexus model, some felt the Camry had offered too many features such that it was inappropriate in a car competing for the mid-size segment.

== Classification ==
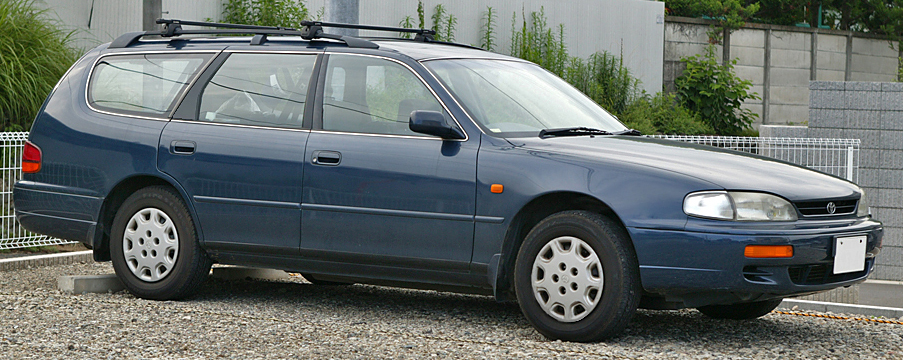
1994–1996 Toyota Scepter 2.2 station wagon (Japan)

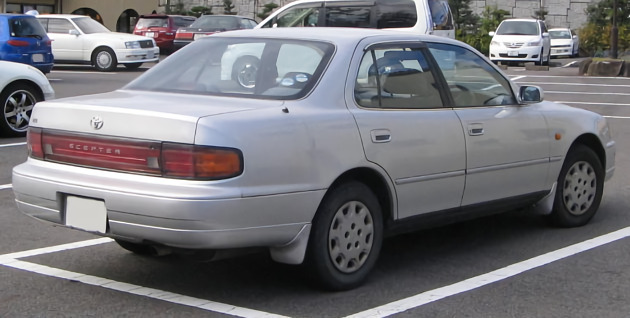
1992–1994 Toyota Scepter 2.2 sedan (Japan)

In development since 1986, Toyota replaced the compact V20 Camry with an all-new V30 series exclusive to Japan in 1990. While marginally larger than the V20, the V30 had to comply with Japanese tax legislation. To meet the "number five" compact car tax bracket, the Camry V30 had to adhere to the 1,700-millimetre (66.9 in) width and 4,700-millimetre (185.0 in) length limit. Particularly in the United States, this narrower model would not generate enough sales, as proved by its V20 Camry forerunner. Concurrently, the "wide-body" Camry (XV10) was developed from 1988 and the final design frozen in late 1988. Design patents were filed at the Japan Patent Office on 28 February 1989 for the sedan and for the wagon on 18 July 1989 under patent numbers 820638 and 820654. Introduced to North America on 9 September 1991, the XV10 Camry was sold alongside the V30 in Japan, badged as the Toyota Scepter. Toyota chose the name "Scepter" as a reference to the Camry/Crown naming tradition, as a "scepter" is a symbolic ornamental staff held by a ruling monarch, a prominent item of royal regalia.

The smaller V30 Camry varied in other areas besides the size. Although the underpinnings, doors and fenders, and overall basic design cues were common between the two cars, the smaller Camry sported harder, more angular front- and rear-end styling treatment, with the wide-body model presenting a more curvaceous silhouette. This was a departure from the V20 generation Camry which, although had many more rounded panels than the V10 series, was nevertheless generally slab-sided in shape.

The XV10 is regarded as the first Camry to break into the mid-size car market, the market Toyota billed as "world-sized". At the same time, the once subcompact Corolla was moved to the compact class, and the Camry moved to the mid-size class. This Scepter model marked the transition away from a smaller vehicle into a larger, more luxurious family car. The first US-built XV10 Camry rolled off the Georgetown, Kentucky plant on Tuesday, 3 September 1991 and the last in June 1996.

The Japanese market received a new V40 series Camry in 1994, yet the XV10 lived on until 1996, before being replaced by the XV20 Camry. Once the Japan-only V40 Camry ended production in 1998, this marked the cessation of separate Camrys—a global Camry—and a smaller Japanese domestic market version. In Japan after 1998, the smaller Vista V50 took up the former V40 Camry.

== Powertrains ==
Body code	Engine	Equation	Model code
XV10	2.2 L 5S-FE	S + X = SX (S + XV = SXV)	SXV10/SDV10
XV10	3.0 L 3VZ-FE	Z + X = C (VZ + XV = VCV)	VCV10/VDV10
XV10	3.0 L 1MZ-FE	Z + X = C (MZ + XV = MCV)	MCV10

The XV10, at its most basic level, offered a 2.2-liter 5S-FE four-cylinder engine, up from 2.0 liters in the V20 and V30 Camrys. This unit produced 97 kW (130 hp) of power and 197 N⋅m (145 ft⋅lbf) of torque, although the exact figures varied slightly depending on the market. Power and displacement increases were also received for the V6 engine. The 3.0-liter 3VZ-FE unit was rated at 138 kW (185 hp) and 264 N⋅m (195 ft⋅lbf). An all-new aluminium 1MZ-FE V6 debuted in North American models from 1994, with other markets retaining the 3VZ-FE V6. Power and torque rose to 140 kW (188 hp) and 275 N⋅m (203 ft⋅lbf), respectively.

== Safety ==
Both the National Highway Traffic Safety Administration (NHTSA) and the Insurance Institute for Highway Safety (IIHS) published crash information for the Camry. The Camry was tested for only frontal (NHTSA) and frontal offset (IIHS) crashes. NHTSA gave the 1994–1996 Camry four stars for the driver and three stars for the passenger. The IIHS scored the same car "acceptable" overall, with three out of six categories listed as "acceptable" and the other three listed as "good".

The Used Car Safety Ratings, published in 2008 by the Monash University Accident Research Centre in Australia found that 1993–1997 Scepter-based Camrys and Holden Apollos provide an "average" level of occupant safety protection in the event of an accident.

== Markets ==
=== Japan ===
Toyota in Japan originally released the Scepter as a station wagon imported from the United States in September 1992. Japanese manufacture of the sedan occurred soon after, coming to the market in November 1992. From November 1993, Toyota began importing the coupe model from the United States. Scepters were phased out in 1996, starting with the coupe (April), wagon (June), and sedan (December). The large and spacious wagon, when fitted with third row seating that stowed away under the cargo floor, could accommodate seven passengers. All three body variants were available with either the 2.2- and 3.0-liter engines.

=== North America ===

1992–1994 Toyota Camry V6 LE sedan (US)

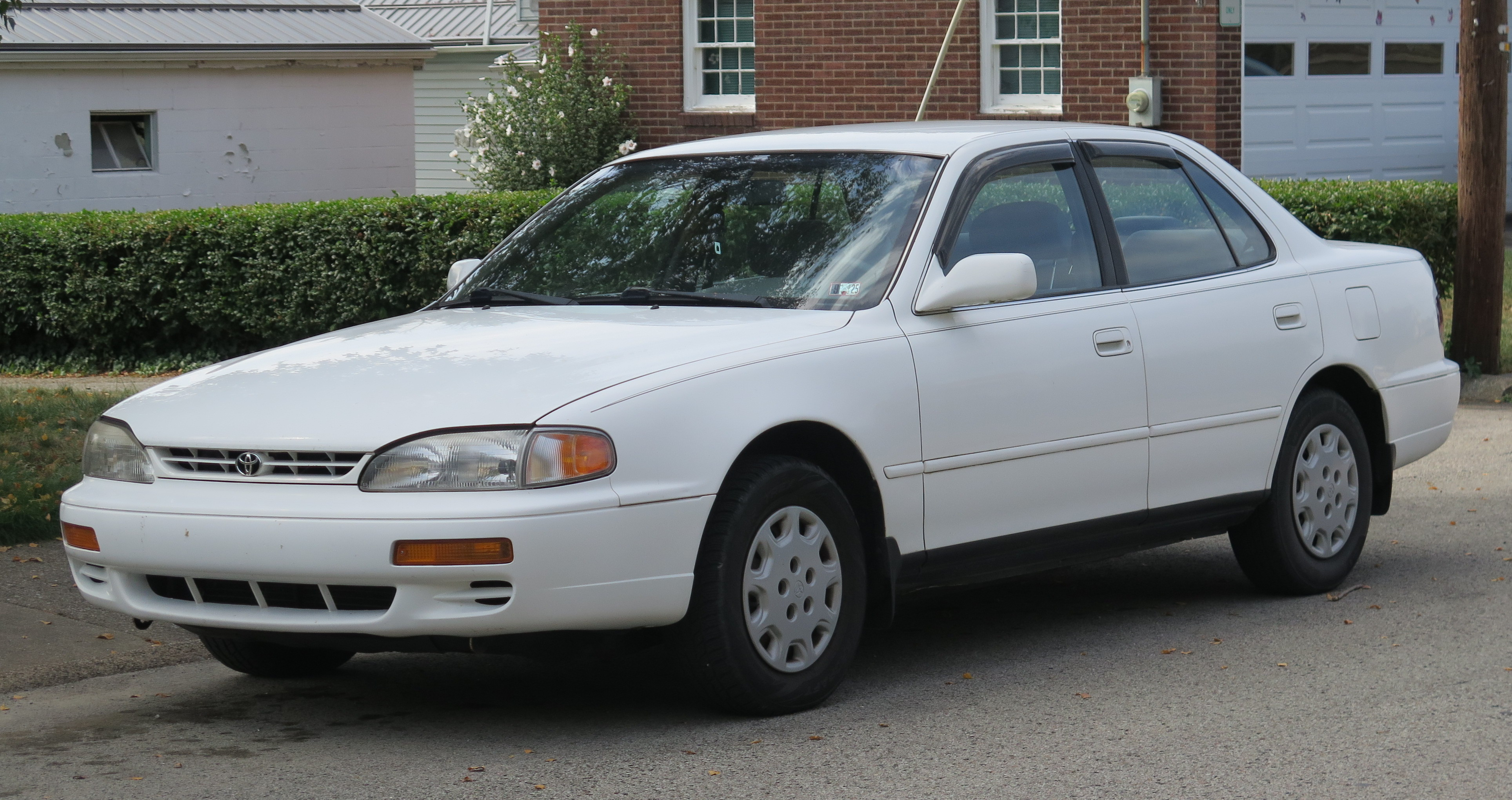

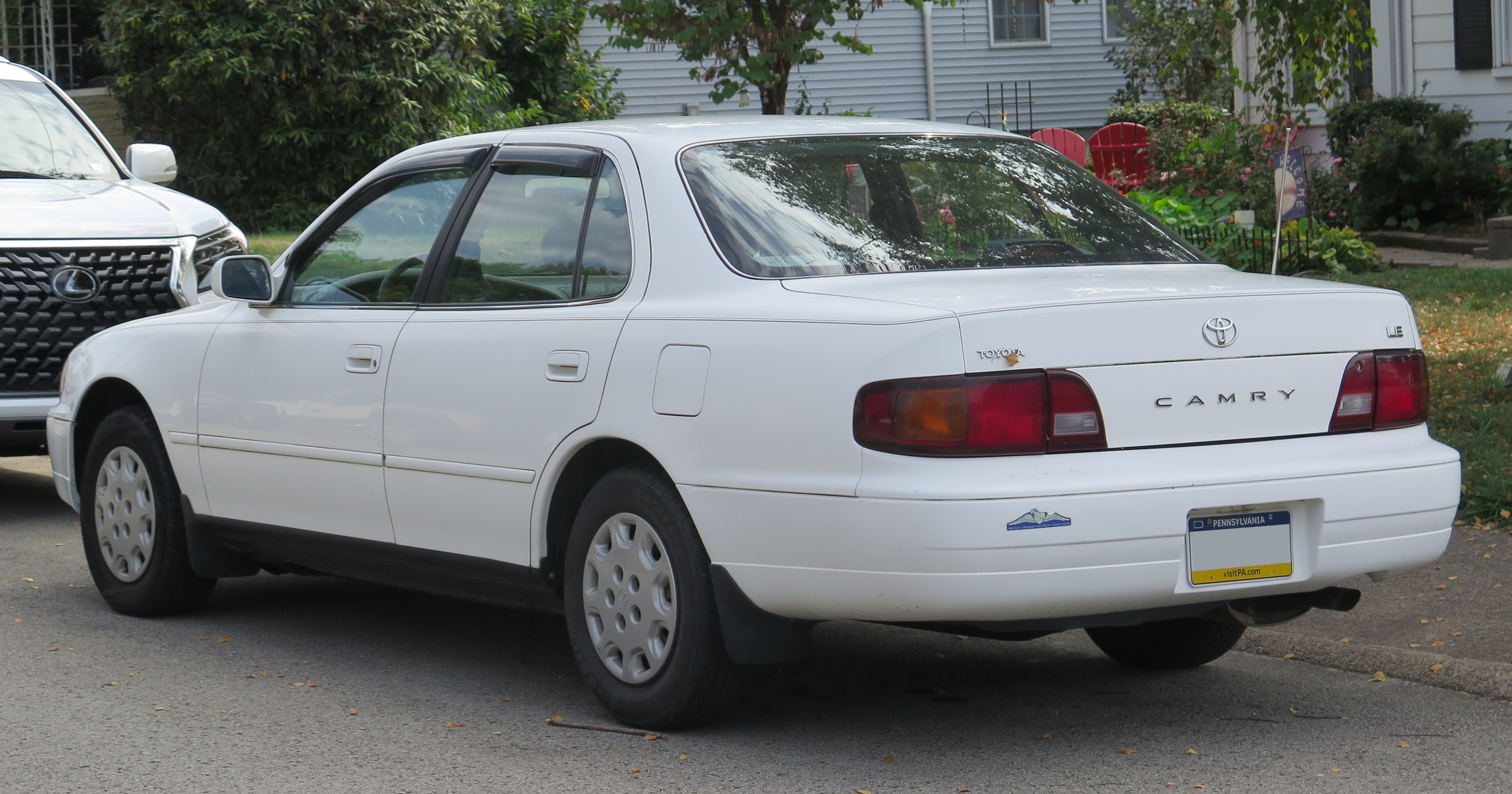
1995–1996 Toyota Camry V6 LE sedan (US)

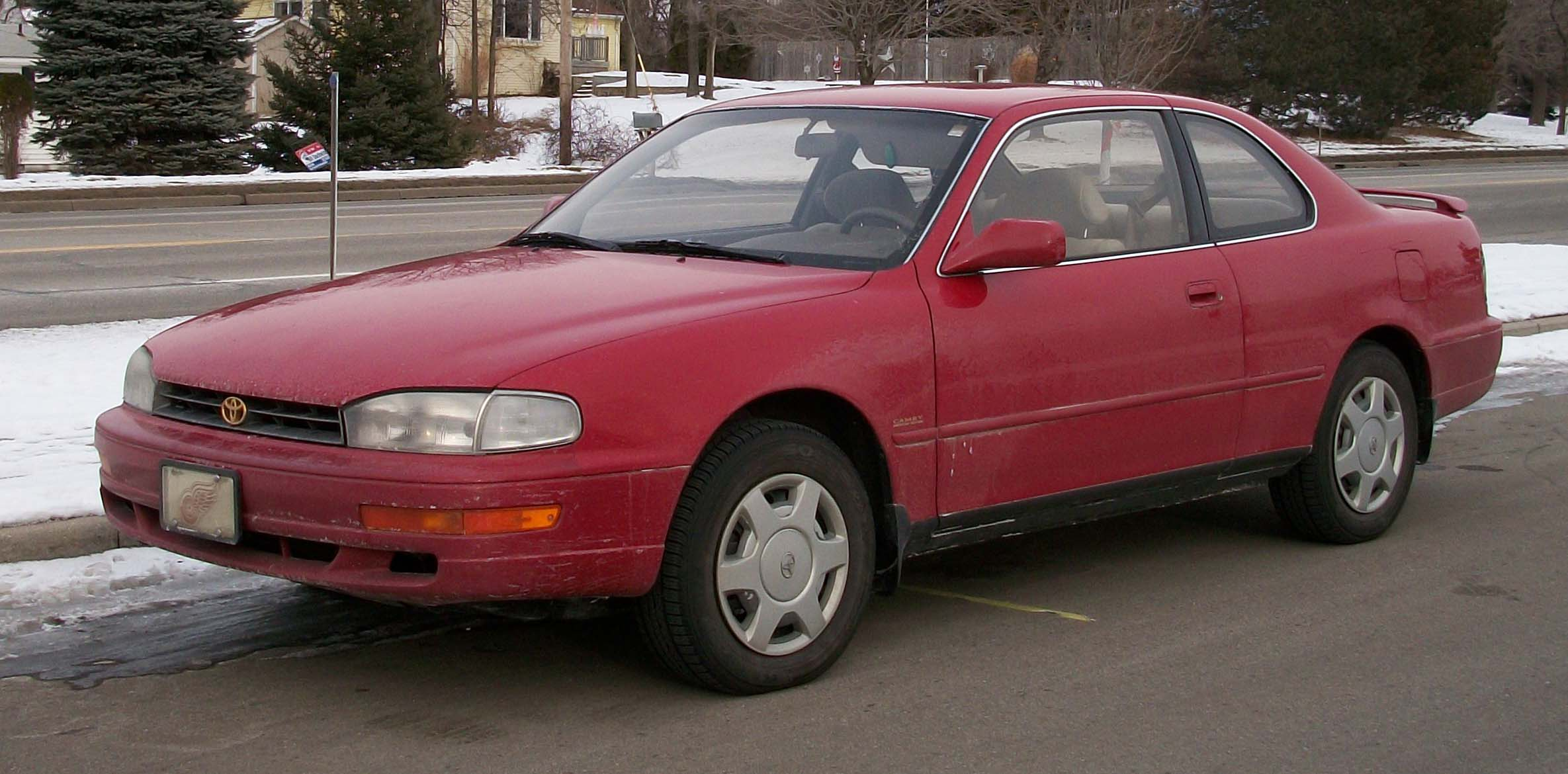
1994 Toyota Camry coupé (US)

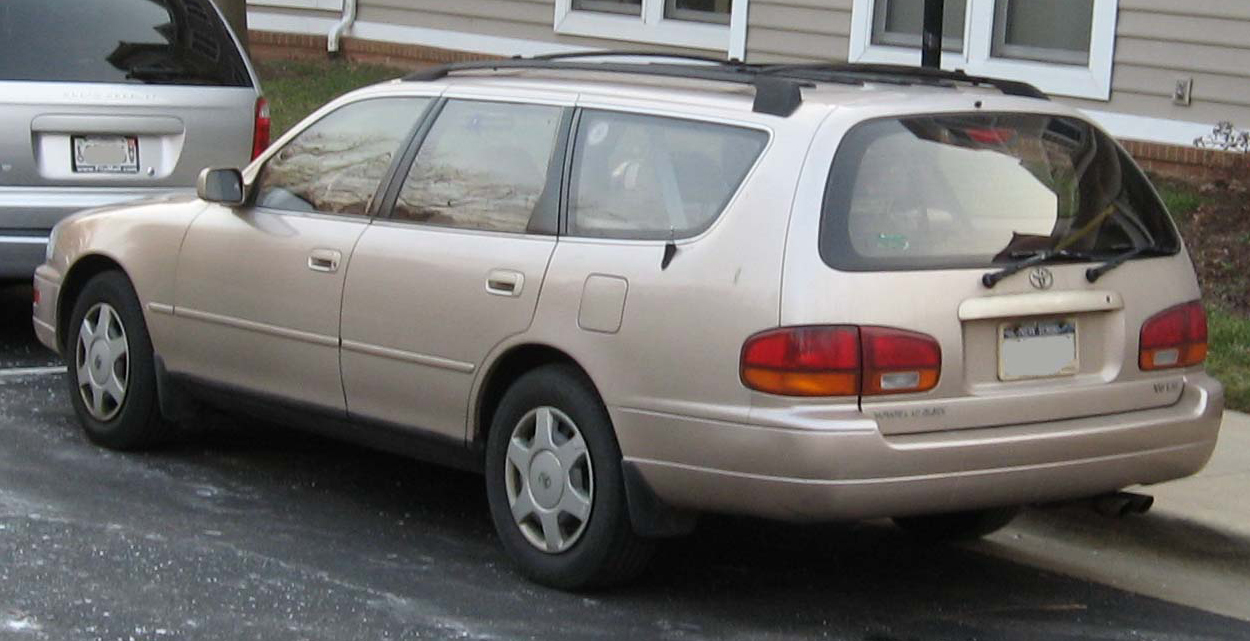
1992–1994 Toyota Camry LE wagon (US)

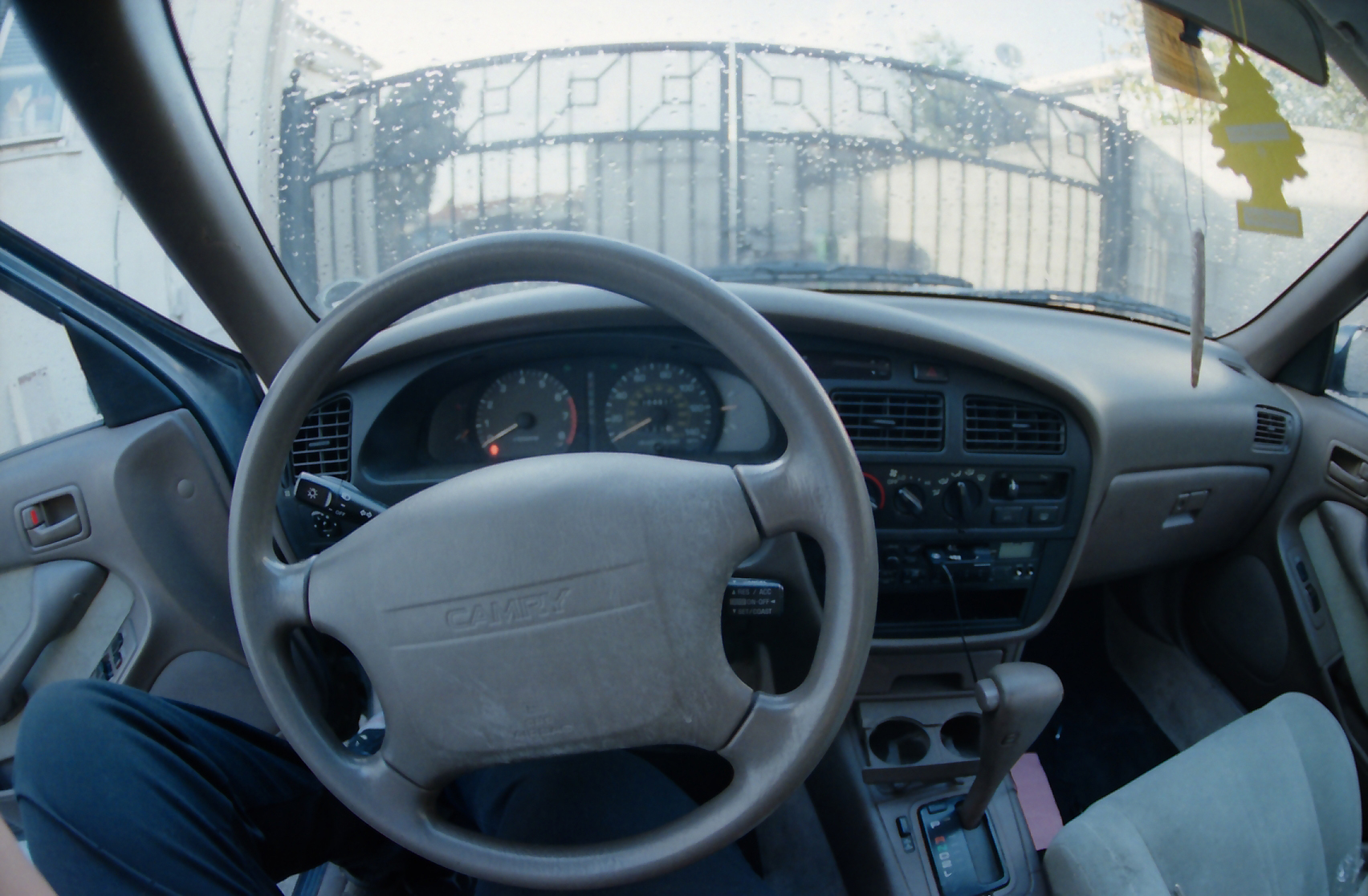
Interior

For the North American market, Camrys were produced in Georgetown, Kentucky by Toyota Motor Manufacturing Kentucky. Introduced in October 1991 as a 1992 model year, automatic transmission became the only option on all but the base and sport model Camrys, whereas previously, a manual transmission was available on the majority of trim levels. In addition to the DX and LE trims, 1992 saw the addition of an XLE luxury trim and the SE sport trim (arriving in March 1992). The SE model differs from the LE and XLE in appearance with the addition of a standard V6 engine, alloy wheels, a rear spoiler, and black side mirrors as well as the sports suspension from the Lexus ES 300. The range-topping XLE was equipped with leather upholstery along with an electric sunroof and power adjustable driver's seat. The station wagon body styles were offered in a new seven-seat guise starting with March 1992 production (mid-1992 launch), compared to five in the regular wagon and sedan. These station wagon body variants were also made in right-hand drive configuration for export to Japan, badged as Scepter. Wagons were also produced in Australia. This generation of Camry was featured on Car and Driver magazine's Ten Best list for 1992 and 1993.

Differences between the North American Camry and the Scepter were few. While the North American versions received a revised V6 engine (1MZ-FE) in 1993, the Scepter used the same 3VZ-FE V6 over the entire model cycle. The Scepter headlamps were a wraparound design (1992–1994 models), using a dual-filament bulb along with integrated fog lights. Unlike the North American Camry, the 1992–1994 model tail lamps did not include red reflectors or side markers. The Scepter also included an updated climate control unit with an LCD in some models. Other differences include the "Scepter" trunk garnish, fender marker lights, some options, and interior trim.

Toyota released a coupé version of the Camry in 1993, for the 1994 model year with styling very similar to the four-door version, stimulating modest sales. This vehicle would be dropped for the next generation and replaced by the Camry Solara. Also in this year, the 3VZ-FE V6 departed in favour of the new aluminium 1MZ-FE V6. This new engine coincided with the standard fitment of dual front airbags, whereas the 1991 to 1993 Camrys only has driver's air bag.

The Camry was given a facelift in the third quarter of 1994 for the 1995 model year, which design patents were filed for on 8 May 1993 at the Japan Patent Office under patent number 820638-002. Minor exterior changes included a revised front fascia with different front turn signals and reshaped headlamps. Additionally, the rear fascia was updated, now with body-coloured plastic between the tail lamps where the model name "Camry" was printed. This was instead of the red plastic on higher trim levels and black plastic on lower trim levels of the 1992 to 1994 models. The tail lamps themselves were also slightly different. Another change, this time mechanical came in 1996; the 2.2-liter engine was detuned slightly to 93 kilowatts (125 hp) to meet stricter emissions standards. Additionally, in 1996 the cam angle sensor in the distributor was also replaced with a crank angle sensor to achieve a smoother idle.

=== Australia ===
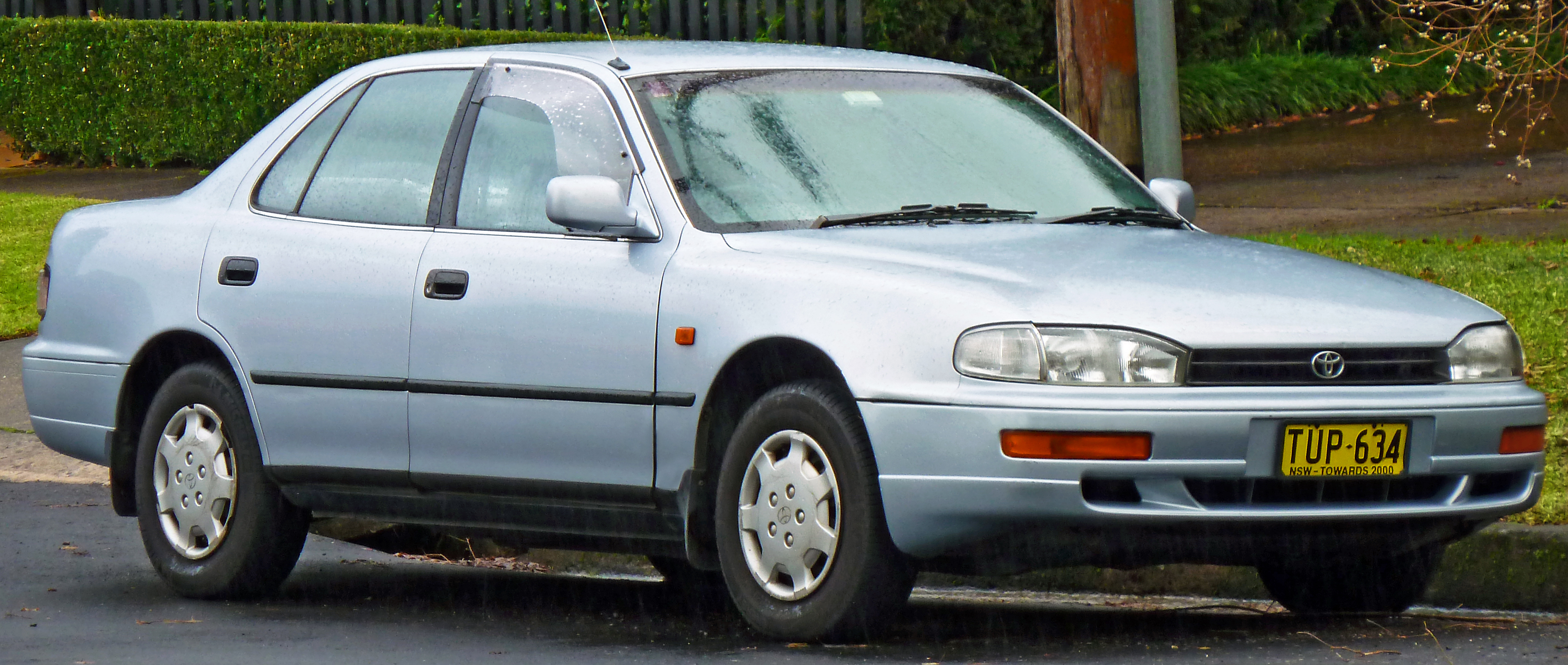
Pre-facelift Toyota Camry CSX sedan (SDV10; Australia)

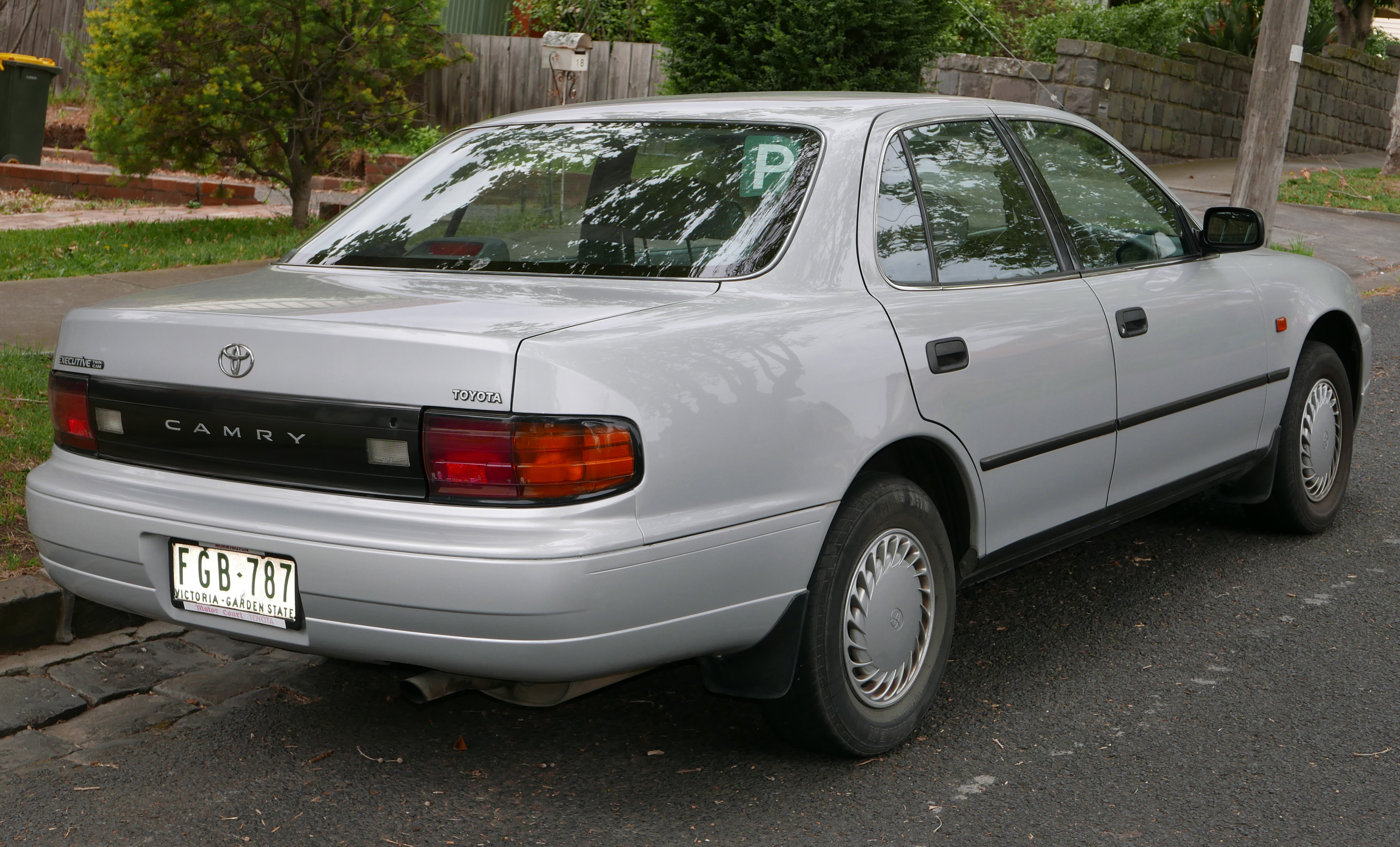
Pre-facelift Toyota Camry Executive sedan (SDV10; Australia)

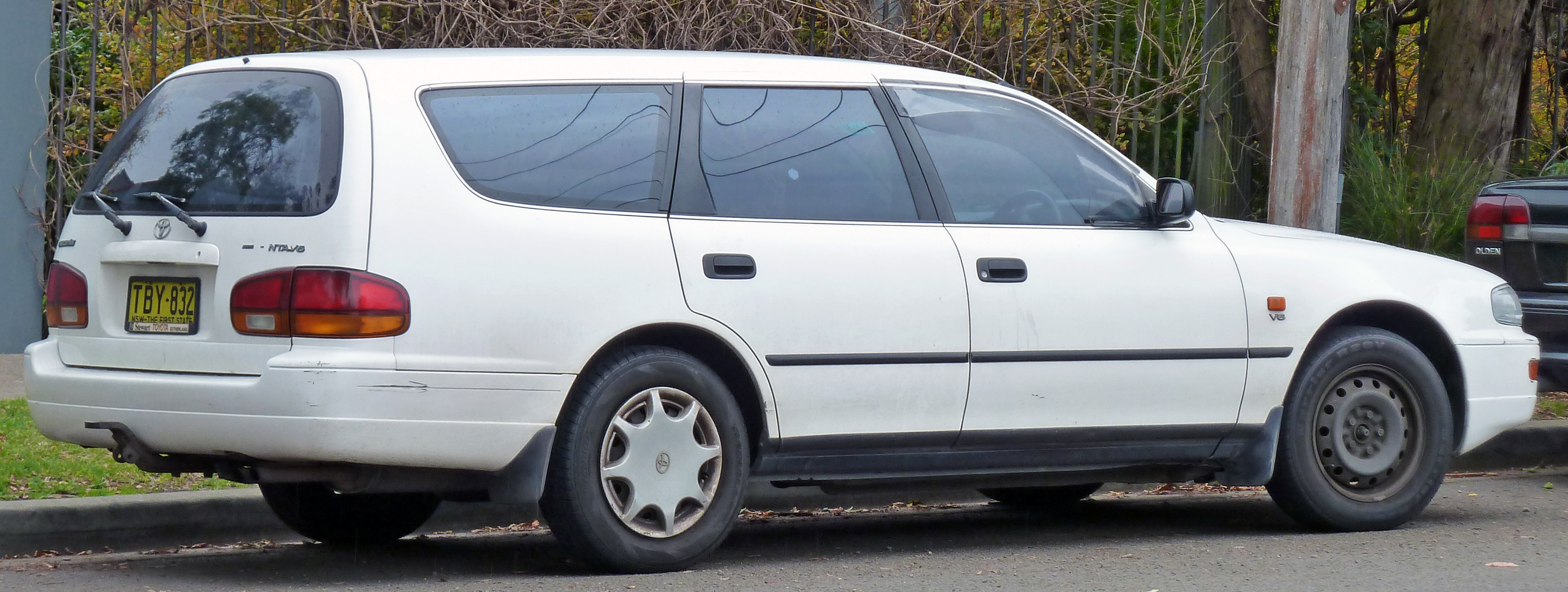
Pre-facelift Toyota Camry Vienta Executive station wagon (VDV10; Australia)

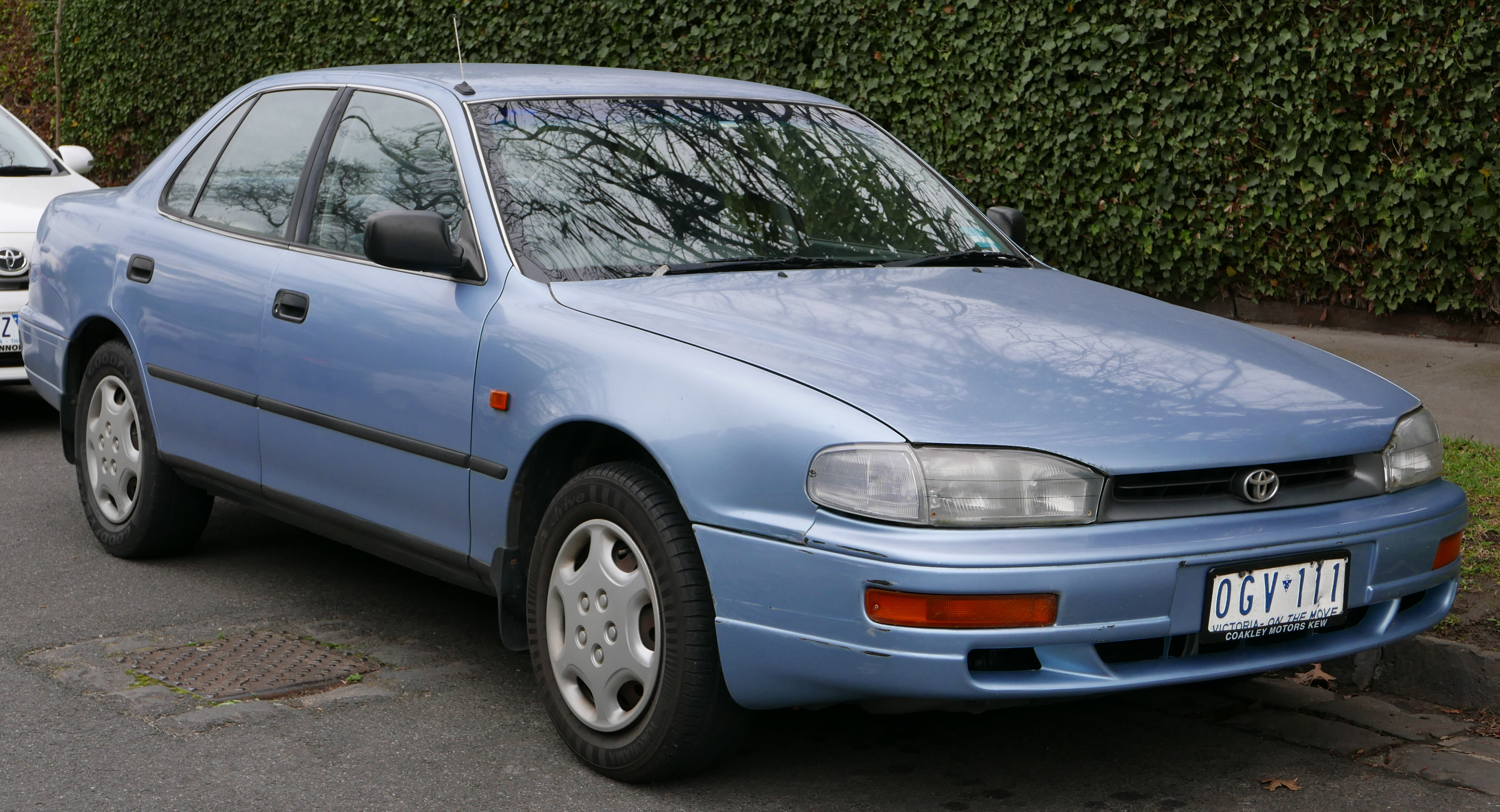
Facelift Toyota Camry Intrigue sedan (SXV10R; Australia)

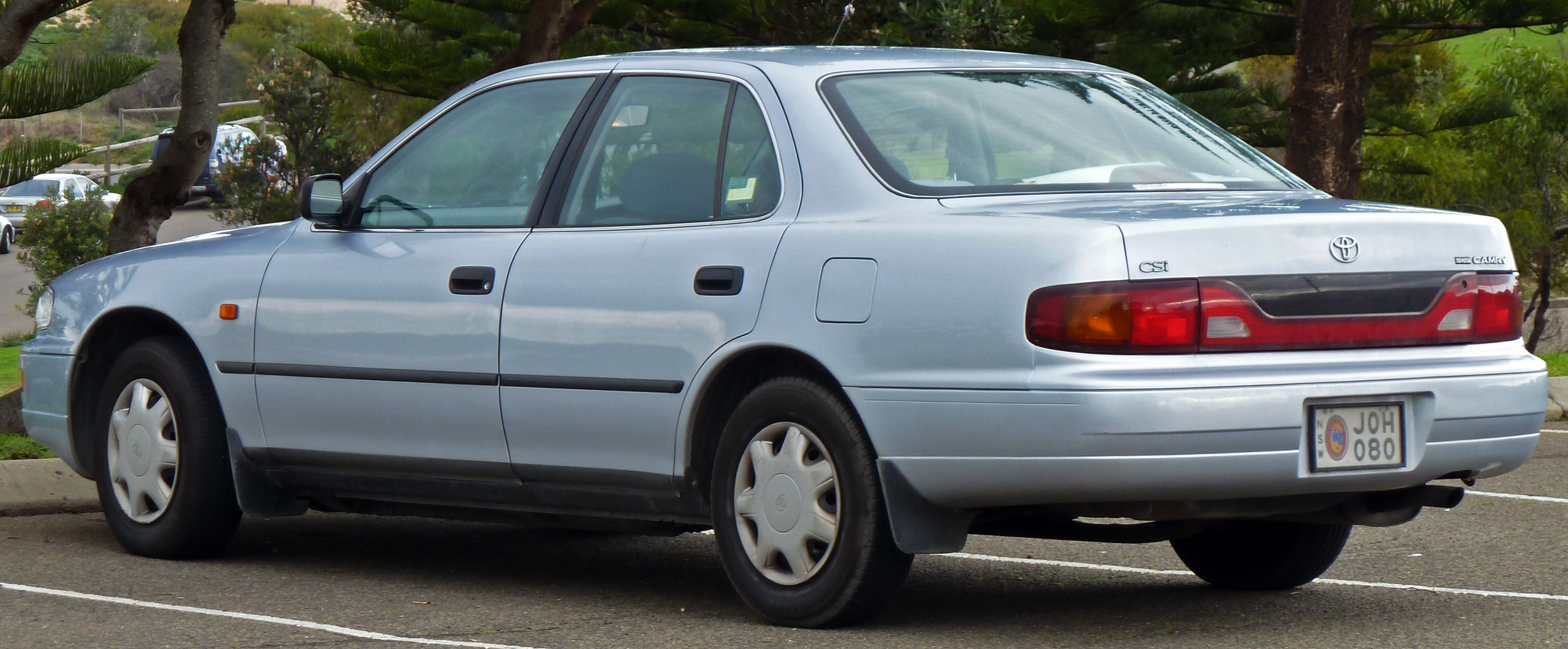
Facelift Toyota Camry CSi sedan (SXV10R; Australia)

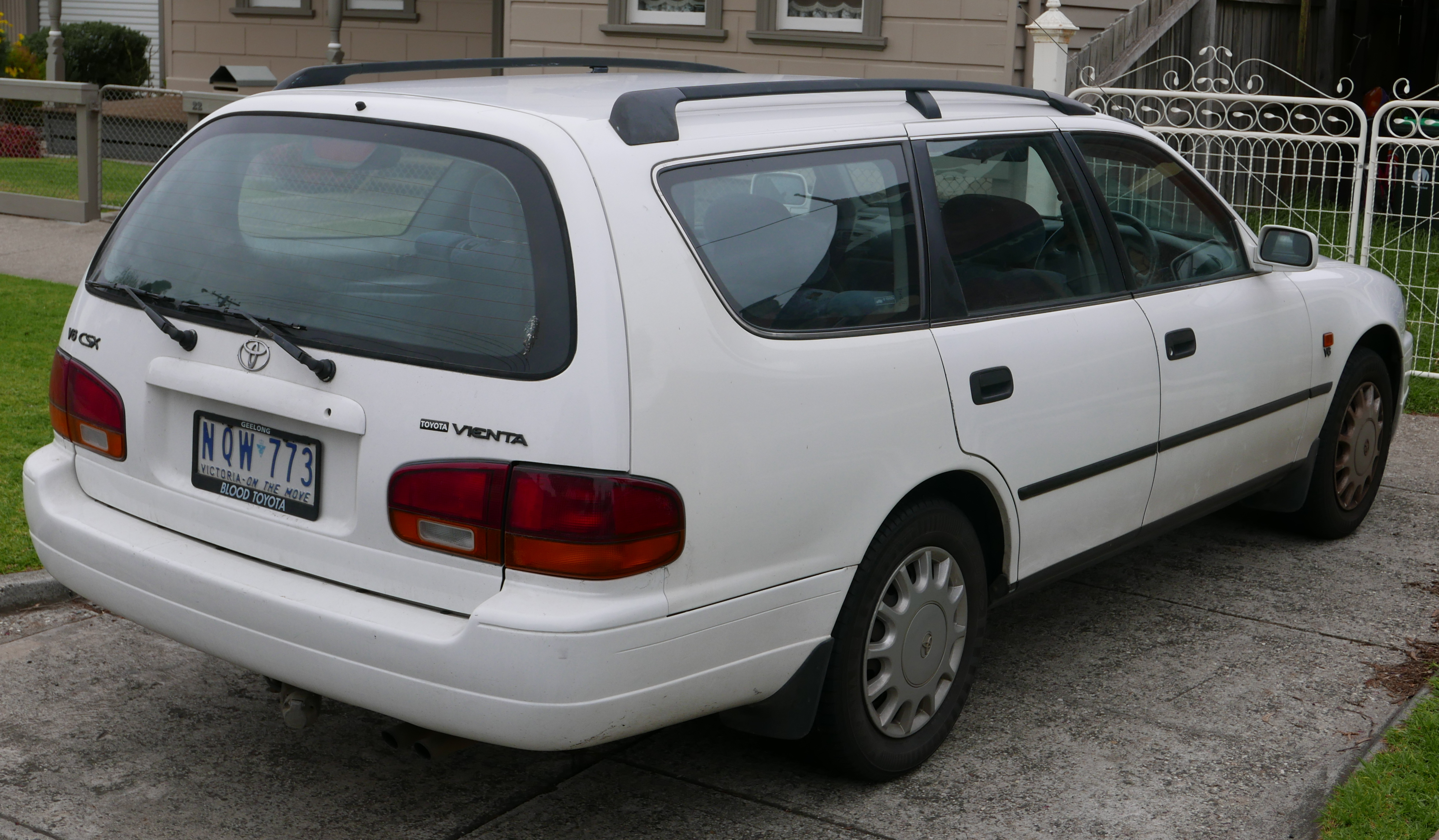
Facelift Toyota Vienta CSX station wagon (VCV10R; Australia)

The range of Camrys in Australia consisted of both four-cylinder (SDV10) and V6 (VDV10) sedans and station wagons. These were built at Toyota's Port Melbourne facility from 2 December 1992. The then Prime Minister, Paul Keating attended the official launch and commencement of sales on 15 February 1993. The four-cylinder Camrys consisted of the Executive, CSi and Ultima sedan models teamed with either a four-speed automatic or a five-speed manual transmission. The V6 range was the same but was known as the Camry Vienta. Like the four-cylinder variant, Camry Vientas were available exclusively in automatic guise and could be distinguished by their colour-coded front grille. In October 1993, a new V6 sedan model called the Touring Series was launched, fitted with sports suspension. In April 1994, the range was revised slightly, where the Executive model was renamed CSi and the previous CSi was renamed the CSX.

Toyota Australia ceased manufacturing the XV10 at Port Melbourne in December 1994, with inventory stockpiles built up to last into the new year. Toyota switched Camry production to its new Toyota Australia Altona Plant factory two weeks later in January 1995, with the official launch of the assembly line commissioned by Prime Minister Keating on 31 March. There was little difference between the Port Melbourne and Altona vehicles, except for a new water-borne, environmentally friendly paint process.

In July 1995, the facelifted model was launched in Australia, although this differed to the update applied to the North American variants. The update brought a new grille, slight updates to the rear end, new hubcaps, a lighter interior colour scheme with a new range of fabrics, and the discontinuation of the Ultima trim. Equipment wise, a new security system was fitted with remote central locking, engine immobiliser and alarm. The CSi gained four-wheel disc brakes, and optional anti-lock brakes. Seat belt webbing clamps for the front seats were now fitted as was a lap-sash belt in the centre rear. Climate control air conditioning for the CSX, an improved stereo system, and the addition of cup holders also featured.

From October 1995, the V6 models were simply known as the Vienta—losing the Camry identity altogether. The availability of manual transmission on the CSi and Touring Series V6 sedan variants coincided with the update, while the V6 Grande superseded the V6 Ultima. Perforated leather upholstery and wood grain trim on the Grande was optional. Towards the end of the model run, special edition Getaway (October 1996) and Intrigue (April 1997) sedan models were launched. Based on the CSi, the Getaway was further equipped with 14-inch alloy wheels, a CD player and air conditioning. Also based on the CSi, the Intrigue added air conditioning, CD player, Jacquard upholstery, extra seat-back map pockets, and 15-inch wheels. Toyota fitted the four-cylinder Intrigue with the same wheel covers as the Vienta CSi, with the Vienta Intrigue upgraded to alloy wheels.

In August 1993, exports to Thailand commenced. In February 1996, Toyota Australia began exporting left-hand drive Camrys to the Middle East.

As a result of the Australian Government-backed Button car plan, both four- and six-cylinder sedan and station wagon version of the Camry were sold at Holden dealerships as the Holden Apollo from March 1993. These models lasted until 1997, replaced by the Holden Vectra.

=== Europe ===
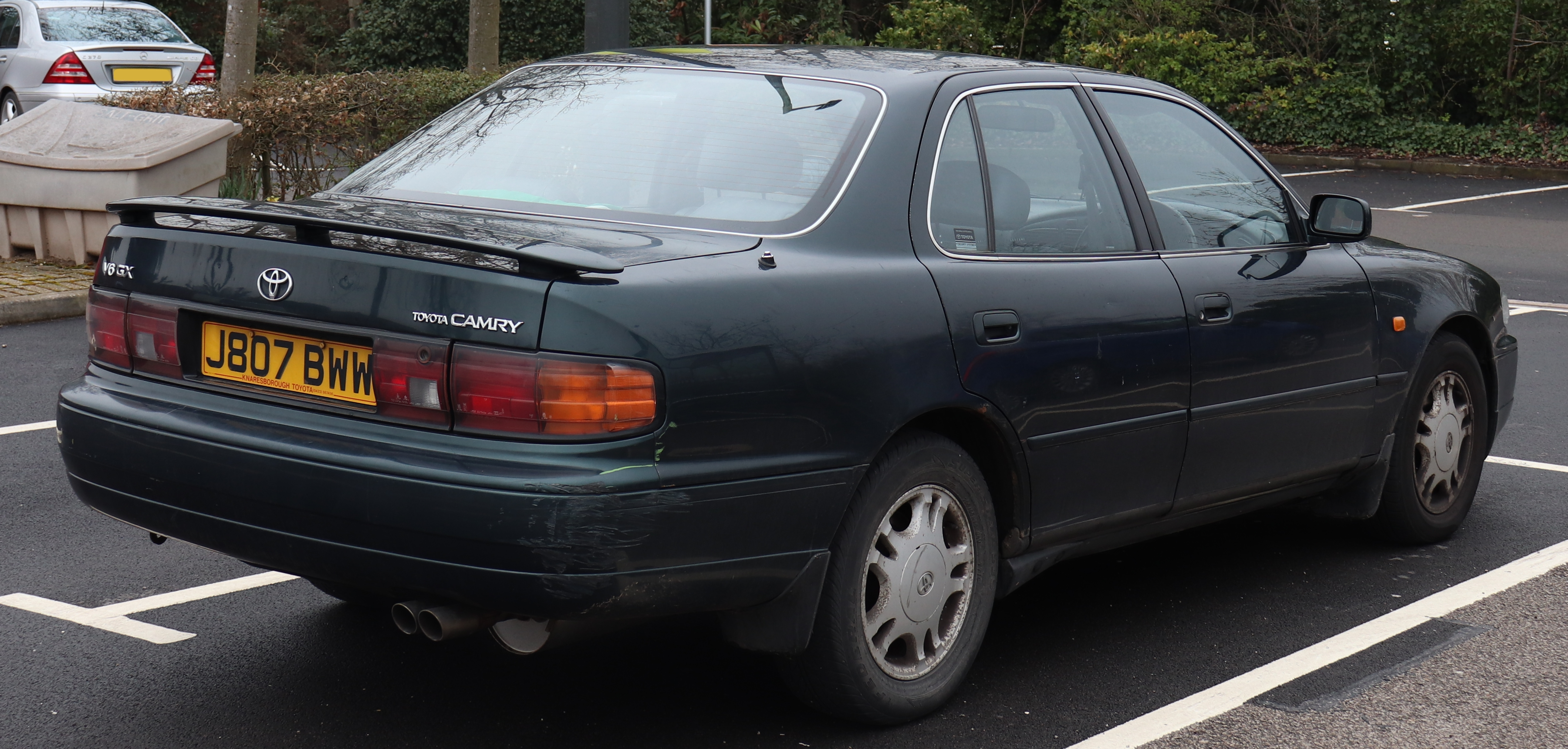
1992 Toyota Camry GX V6 (United Kingdom)

In Europe, the Camry range was more limited, compared with Japan, Australia and the United States.

Launched in October 1991, European versions featured the registration plate mount situated between the two tail light assemblages as opposed to the bumper-mounted cavity used in all other markets.

The range consisted of the 2.2 GL and 3.0 GX models in sedan and station wagon form. In the UK, the GX version was available with an automatic transmission only, although both manual and automatic were offered in continental Europe for the 2.2- and 3.0-litre models. All European-market Camrys were produced at the Tsutsumi plant in Japan (except for the wagon, which was imported from the United States, as was the case for the same variant of the Japan-market Scepter).

Model	Years
2.2 GL saloon	1991–1993
2.2i saloon/estate	1993–1996
3.0 V6 saloon/estate	1993–1994
3.0 V6 GX saloon/estate	1994–1996

=== China ===
Exports of Camrys from this generation, Toyota Camry (XV20) and Toyota Camry (XV30) were brought into China through the grey market. The XV10 was imported into China in 1991 from the Georgetown, Kentucky factory in the United States.

Another variant called the Xinkai HXK6630 was also assembled in Zhanjiang, Guangdong Province. These cars were shipped as mostly complete vehicles, with little actual domestic assembly.

=== South Africa ===
The Camry was also built in Durban, South Africa. 3.0-litre models were sold as the "Camry 300i" with the highest specification level badged as the "Camry 300SEi". The Camry was also available with a 2.0-litre and a 2.2-litre power plant in both automatic and manual transmission variants.

=== Middle East ===
The Camry was introduced across the Gulf States in late 1992 for the 1993 model year, serving as the indirect replacement for the Cressida. Initially, sedans and wagons were sourced from Japan and the Kentucky plant respectively. Beginning in February 1996, Toyota started importing them from Australia instead.

Four trims were available: XL, GL, Lumiere and Grande, with the latter two being offered exclusively as a sedan with the V6 power-train. The XL and GL were later renamed to XLi & GLi once Toyota switched to importing the Camry from Australia in 1996. A limited edition, gold trim package was available for the 1997 model year. Sales ended in 1997 with the introduction of the next generation Camry.

== Holden Apollo ==
Holden sold a rebadged version of the Camry XV10 in Australia as the Holden Apollo from 1993 to 1997, replacing the previous Apollo manufactured sold from 1989 that was a rebranded Camry V20. This badge engineering scheme was the result of the Australian government's Button car plan, introduced in May 1984 to rationalise and make the Australian automotive industry more competitive on a global scale by means of reducing import tariffs. This model sharing occurred due to the United Australian Automobile Industries (UAAI) joint venture between Toyota Australia and Holden starting in 1987 that resulted in model sharing between both automakers from August 1989.

From its launch in 1989, the Apollo was always less successful than the Camry from which it was based. By the end of 1993, the UAAI venture cars—the Holden Apollo and Nova, along with the Toyota Lexcen—realised sales of 21 percent at best when compared to the models retailed by their original manufactures. Apollo production in 1992 (V20 series) totalled 4,490 units (17.5 percent of the Toyota Camry figure, excluding exports); 5,314 Apollos were manufactured in 1993 (18.2 percent), and in 1994 production amounted to 5,519 units (14.7 percent).

=== JM (1993–1995) ===
The JM series Apollo arrived at Holden dealerships in March 1993, based on the enlarged Toyota Camry (SDV10/VDV10). These SDV10/VDV10 Toyotas had been introduced to Australia a month earlier, in February 1993.

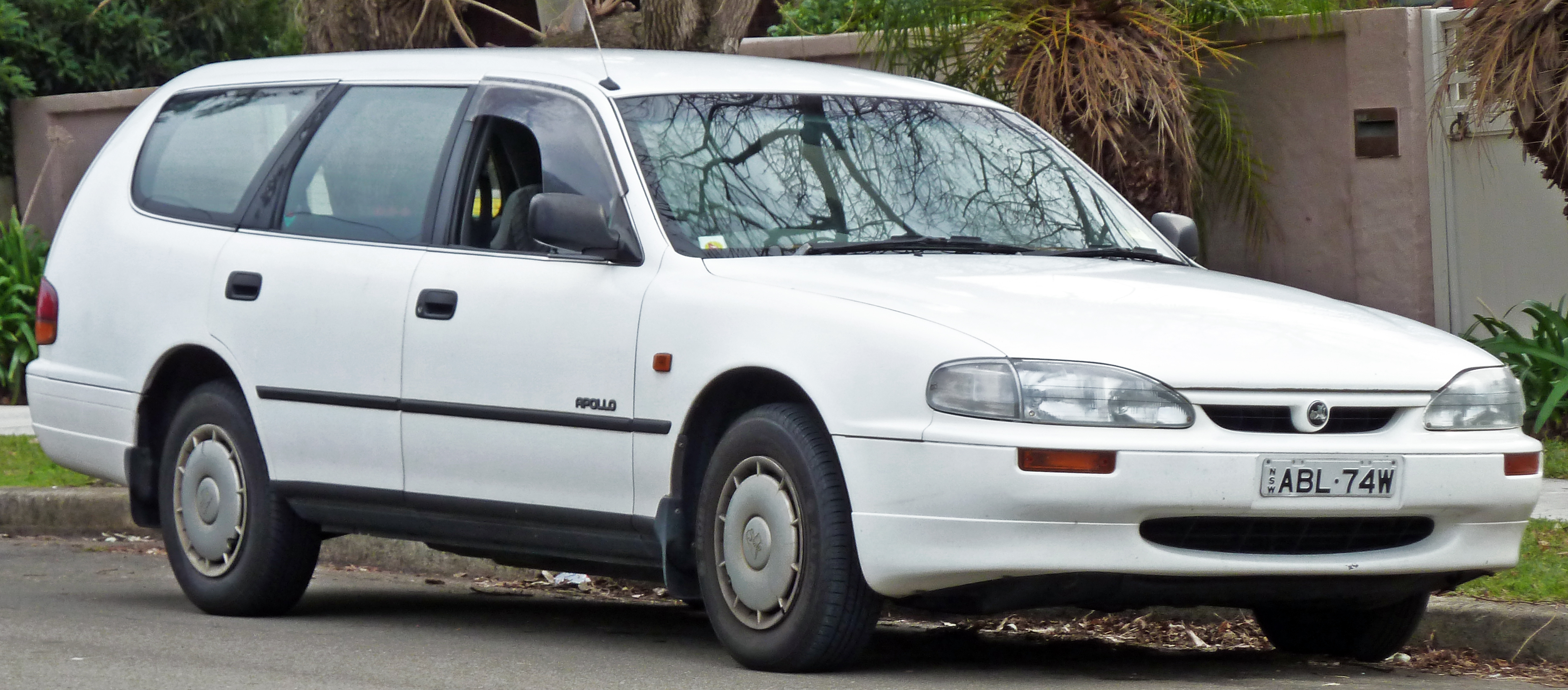

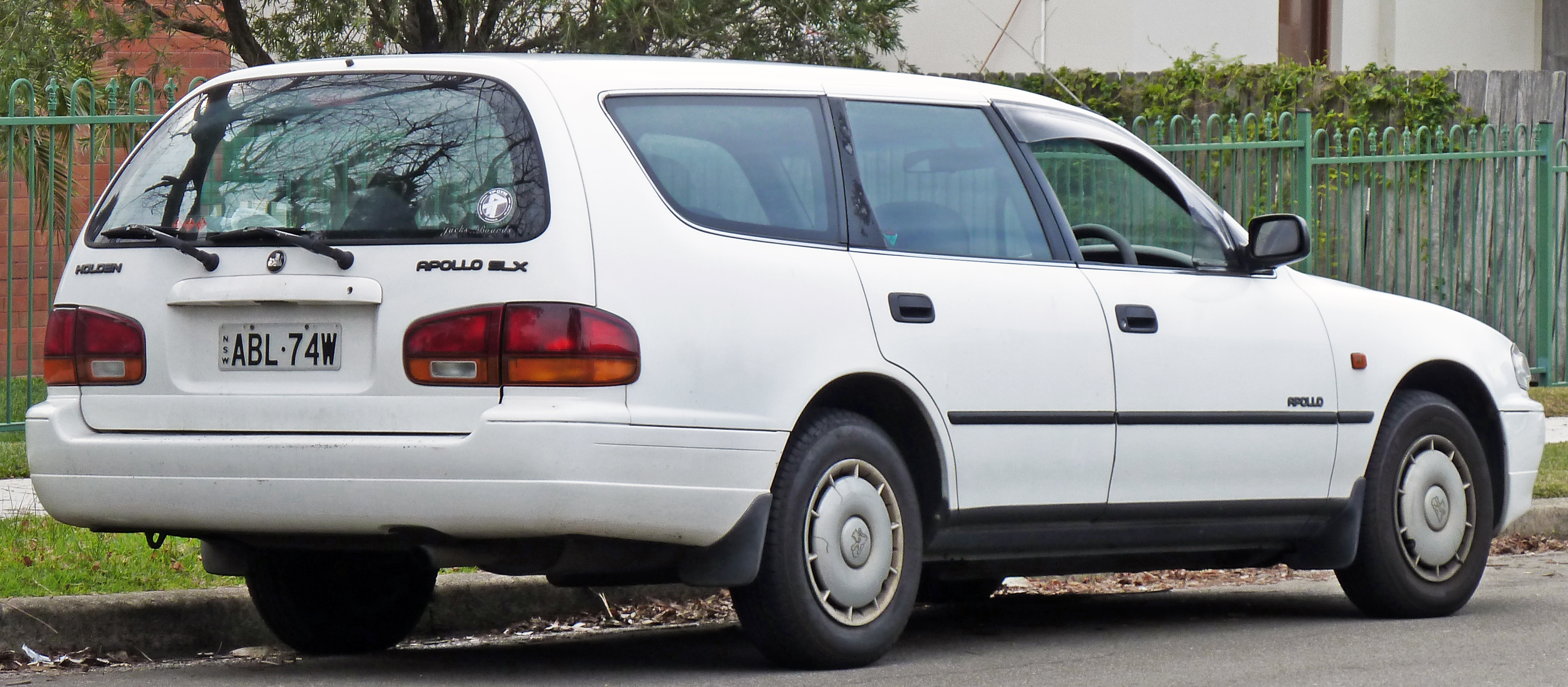
1993–1995 Holden Apollo (JM) SLX wagon

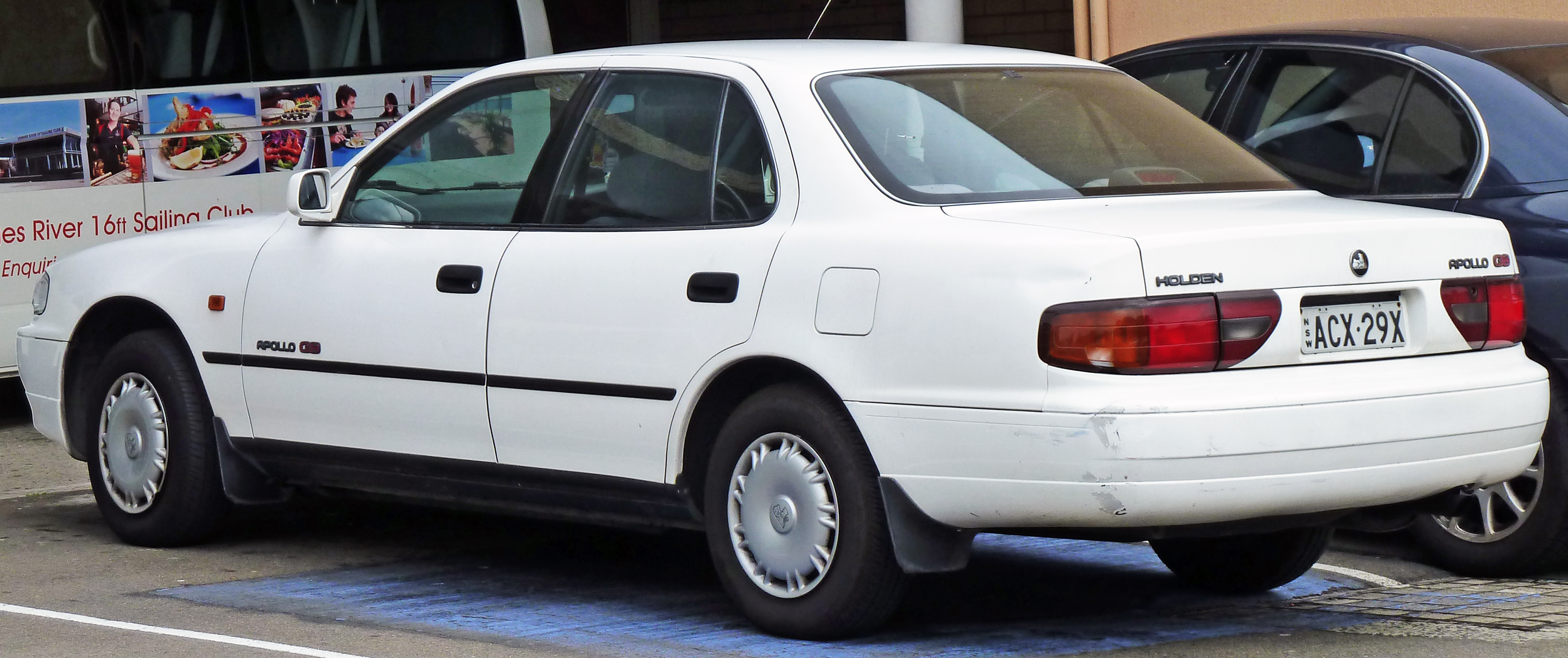
1993–1995 Holden Apollo (JM) GS sedan

The larger size of the new car was heavily advertised by Toyota as the "wide-body" Camry. Holden's advertising differed in this sense, with a more subdued tone to help set it apart. Holden was also granted additional design input with the new JM model, on the grounds of further differentiation between it and the Camry clone. Following the establishment of UAAI, Holden instituted a high-security design centre within the company responsible for producing visual distinction between venture models. Its autonomy and secrecy from the remainder of the firm permitted the exchange of information regarding the new Camry from 1989, thus allowing a unique-to-Apollo identity to be crafted. The end result was an Apollo with its own bumper, bonnet, grille and headlamp assemblage up front, coupled to a markedly different rear, with restyled tail lamps and a decklid-mounted, as opposed to bumper-mounted, registration plate cavity.

Mechanically, the Apollo's setup was a verbatim copy of the Camry, with steering and suspension calibrations left unchanged. Likewise, the powertrains were also as fitted to the Toyota with a twin-cam, EFI 2.2-liter 5S-FE straight-four producing 93 kW (125 hp) and 185 N⋅m (136 lb⋅ft), with an optional quad-cam EFI 3.0-liter 3VZ-FE V6 making 136 kW (182 hp) and 264 N⋅m (195 lb⋅ft). This figure is 3 kW (4.0 hp) down on the equivalent Camry V6. These V6-engined Apollos featured larger-diameter 15-inch wheels over the 14-inch diameter used on the 2.2. The 2.2-liter models also featured a five-speed manual as standard fitment, although an optional electronically controlled four-speed automatic transmission was offered at an extra cost—standard and the sole choice on V6s.

Both four-door sedan and five-door station wagon variants were available as before, although trim levels were limited to SLX and GS. The SLX was aimed at fleet markets, fitted with power steering, a radio cassette player, a remote boot and fuel cap release, and electric side-view mirrors. The sedan-only SLX V6 added four-wheel disc brakes over the 2.2 model's front-disc, rear-drum layout, with anti-lock brakes (ABS) on the V6 available as an option. Wagons without ABS fitted made do with a load-sensing valve mechanism to control rear brake lock-up. The higher GS trim built on the SLX level, adding 60/40 split-fold rear seats, variable intermittent windscreen wipers, a four-speaker stereo, tachometer, central locking and a more luxurious interior upholstery style.

At the same time as Toyota's Camry upgrade in April 1994, Apollo specifications were also uprated slightly. SLXs now had a four- and GSs a six-speaker stereo system, up from two and four, respectively. The SLX also received a tachometer and rear mudflaps, while the GS variant gained standard fitment cruise control and power windows. A second update in June 1994 fitted a driver's airbag as standard on all models bar the four-cylinder SLX.

=== JP (1995–1996) ===
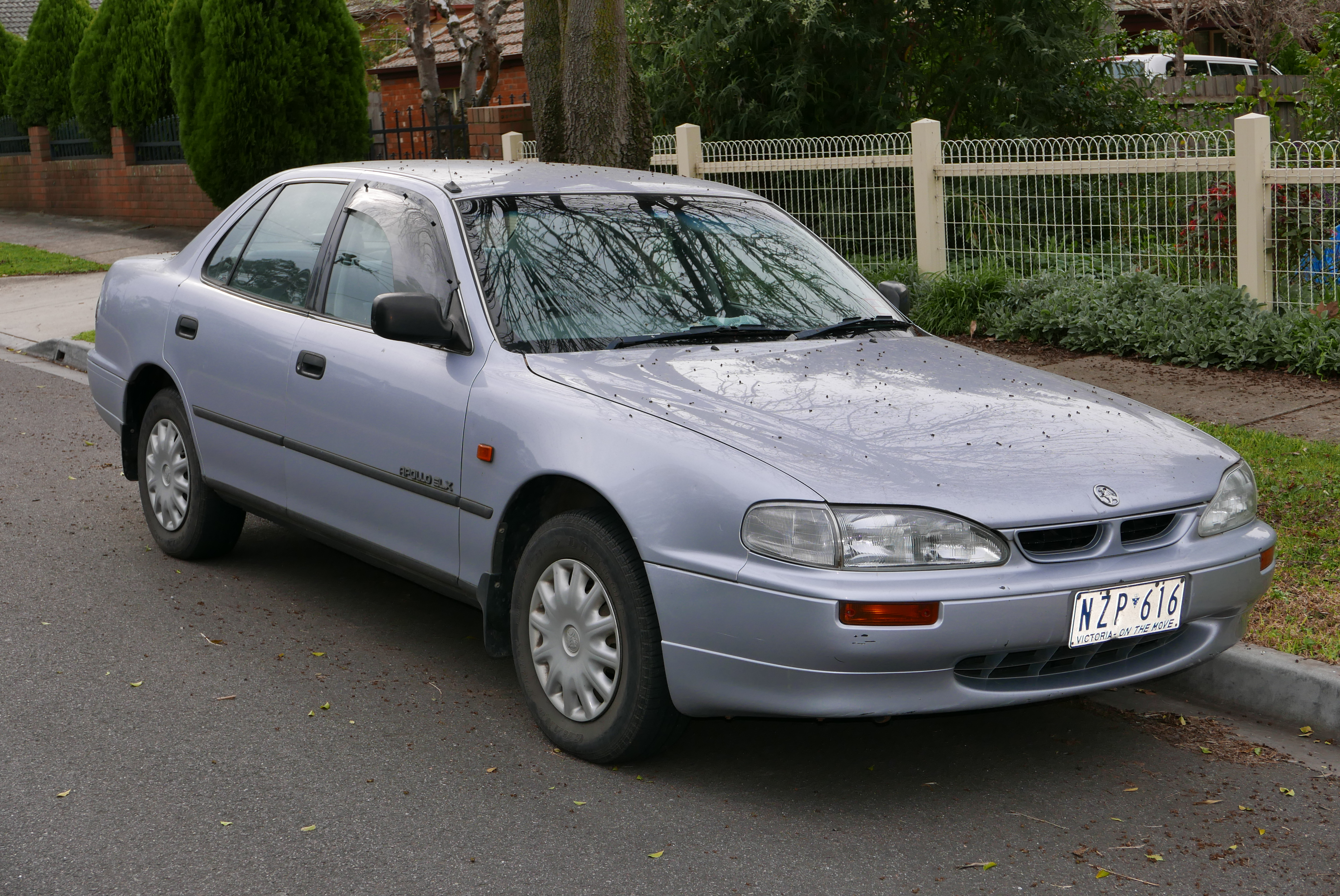

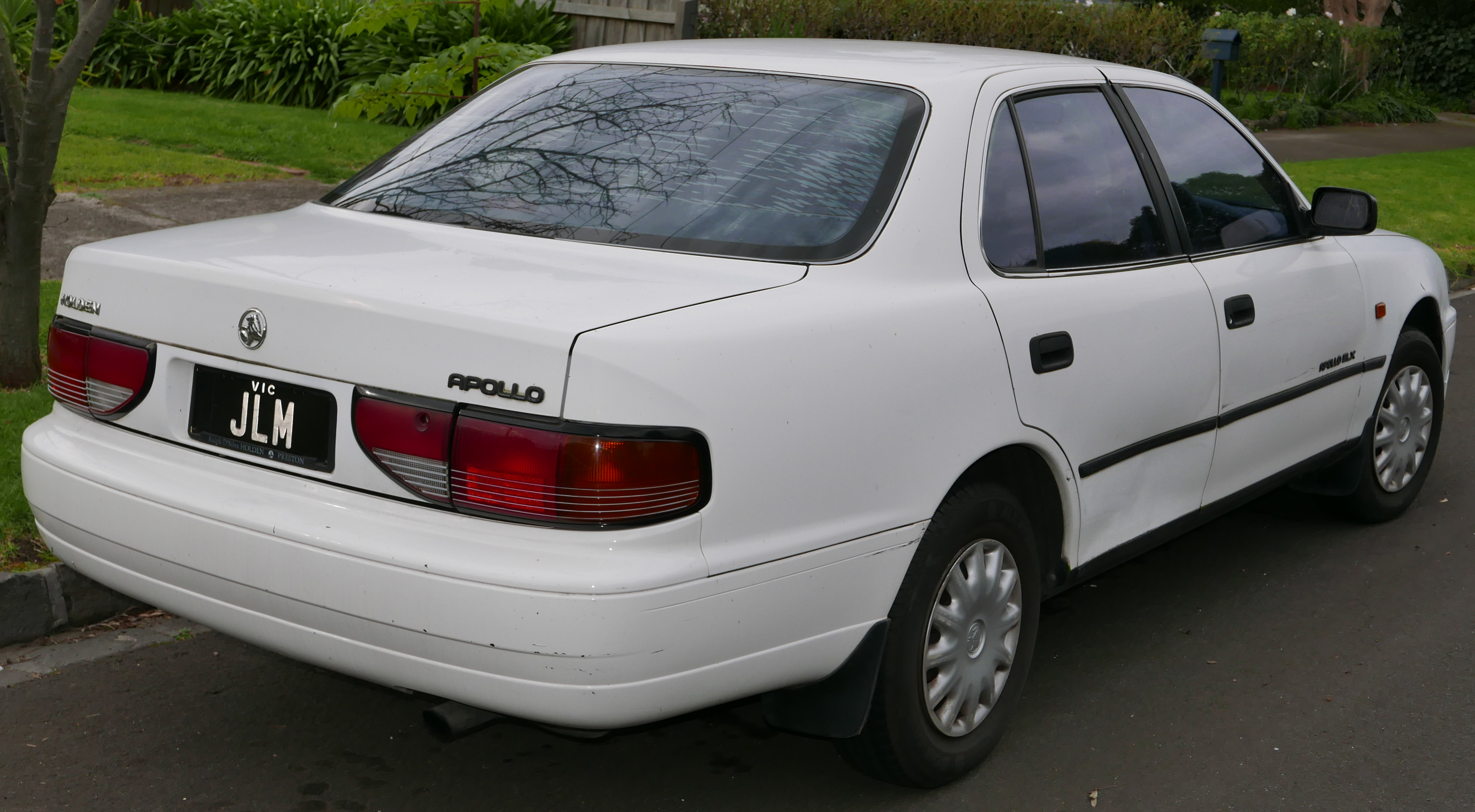
1995–1996 Holden Apollo (JP) SLX sedan

The JP series update succeeded the JM from August 1995. A new grille insert with dual U-shaped apertures tied in with the existing VS Commodore range. The redesigned Holden logo was also relocated from the JM's grille position to the bonnet, and the rear-end was treated to white tail lamp pin striping. At the same time, the model range was revised, the GS wagon removed, and manual transmission could now only be specified in conjunction with the SLX four-cylinder. The availability of ABS was also extended to these four-cylinder models, with four-wheel disc brakes now fitted across the board. In addition to this, remote central locking came standard to the SLX along with rear head restraints. Further enhancements were also made for the GS's sound system.

GM and Toyota dissolved UAAI in March 1996. Apollo production ceased in late 1996 when Toyota and Holden severed their model sharing relations. Enough cars remained in stock until the replacement Holden Vectra arrived in mid-1997, first as a captive import, but locally manufactured after several months.
