= Parlok =

Oy Parlok Ab
- Company type: Private – Oy
- Headquarters: Pargas, Finland
- Key people: Jari Salminen (Managing director)
- Products: mudguards, spray-suppression systems, toolboxes, other products for commercial vehicle industry
- Website: www.parlok.eu

Parlok is a European manufacturer of mudguards and spray-suppression systems for the commercial vehicle industry. Its products are sold throughout the world via national distributors. The main product line of Parlok is the Supra spray-suppression system. Parlok's other products include toolboxes and other plastic products.

Parlok Supra spray-suppression system fulfills the requirements of EU-directives and it has been granted the type approval number e1*109/2011*109/2011*0018*00 by Kraftfahrt-Bundesamt.

Oy Parlok Ab is ISO-certified for its quality and environmental policy (ISO 9001:2008, ISO 14001:2004).
