= Xinkai =

Chinese car manufacturer

Xinkai Automobile Group Co., Ltd.
- Industry: Automotive
- Founded: 1984; 42 years ago (Gaobeidian)
- Headquarters: Gaobeidian, Hebei, China
- Key people: Zhang Zhentang (chairman)
- Products: Automobiles
- Number of employees: 3,000
- Website: hbxk.com

Xinkai (officially Xinkai Auto Manufacture Corporation) (新凯汽车) was a Chinese car manufacturer headquartered in Gaobeidian. In 2018 Xinkai was bought by electric vehicles manufacturer Jimai New Energy Vehicles Co.

== Operations ==
The company included the head office in Gaobeidian, a production and assembly line in Zhuozhou, an auto parts manufacturing facility in Qinghe, and an assembly line in Tai'an.

The Toyota Camry (XV10) was rebadged as the Xinkai HXK6630, where finding a joint venture was difficult in the 1990s. then in 2004, Xinkai entered into an agreement with Mercedes-Benz to assemble the Mercedes-Benz Commercial Vehicle for the Chinese market. Xinkai's original trucks are also exported, mainly to Africa and to Latin America. The Xinkai HXK1021 EB pickup truck is sold in Chile as the Autorrad Ruda. With a capacity of 200,000 vehicles per year, the production of 33,000 vehicles in 2005 and 35,000 in the following year 2006 is known.

In 2007, the Xinkai Pick Up was planned to be sold in the UK as the Xinkai XK by Surrey-based importer Yuejin UK which previously imported and sold Nanjing's Yuejin trucks. Priced at £9,995 and equipped with air conditioning, leather seats, front and rear electric windows, a radio/CD player, power steering and remote central locking as standard. Exterior features consist of chrome side-steps, a chrome rear bumper with a step integrated and a front bullbar. Power comes from a 138 bhp 2.4-litre engine built under licence from Toyota that can run on either petrol or liquefied petroleum gas (LPG) and paired with a five-speed 4x2 manual gearbox. It is unknown whether or not the Xinkai XK made it beyond pre-production stage. Yuejin UK was founded in 2003 and dissolved in 2013.

In 2018 Xinkai was bought by electric vehicles manufacturer Jimai New Energy Vehicles Co.

== Products ==
- Mercedes-Benz Ambulance (梅賽德斯-賓士 救护车)
- Mercedes-Benz Commercial Vehicle (梅賽德斯-賓士 奔驰商务车)
- Mercedes-Benz Police Car (梅賽德斯-賓士 警车)
- Xinkai Century Dragon Extended Version (新凯 世纪蛟龙加长版)
- Xinkai Century Dragon Standard Edition (新凯 世纪蛟龙标准版)
- Xinkai Coach Car (新凯 教练车)
- Xinkai Falcon (Xinkai Lieying, 新凯 猎鹰)
- Xinkai Fashion Star (新凯 时尚之星)
- Xinkai Victory (Xinkai Kai Sheng, 新凯 凯胜)
- Xinkai Light Truck (新凯 轻卡)
- Xinkai Rui Teng (新凯 锐腾)
- Xinkai Ruida Pickup (新凯 锐达皮卡) (also as the "Autorrad Ruda" in Chile)
- Xinkai Single Cabine Pickup (新凯 单排皮卡)
- Xinkai Star City (新凯 都市之星)
- Xinkai SRV

== Gallery ==
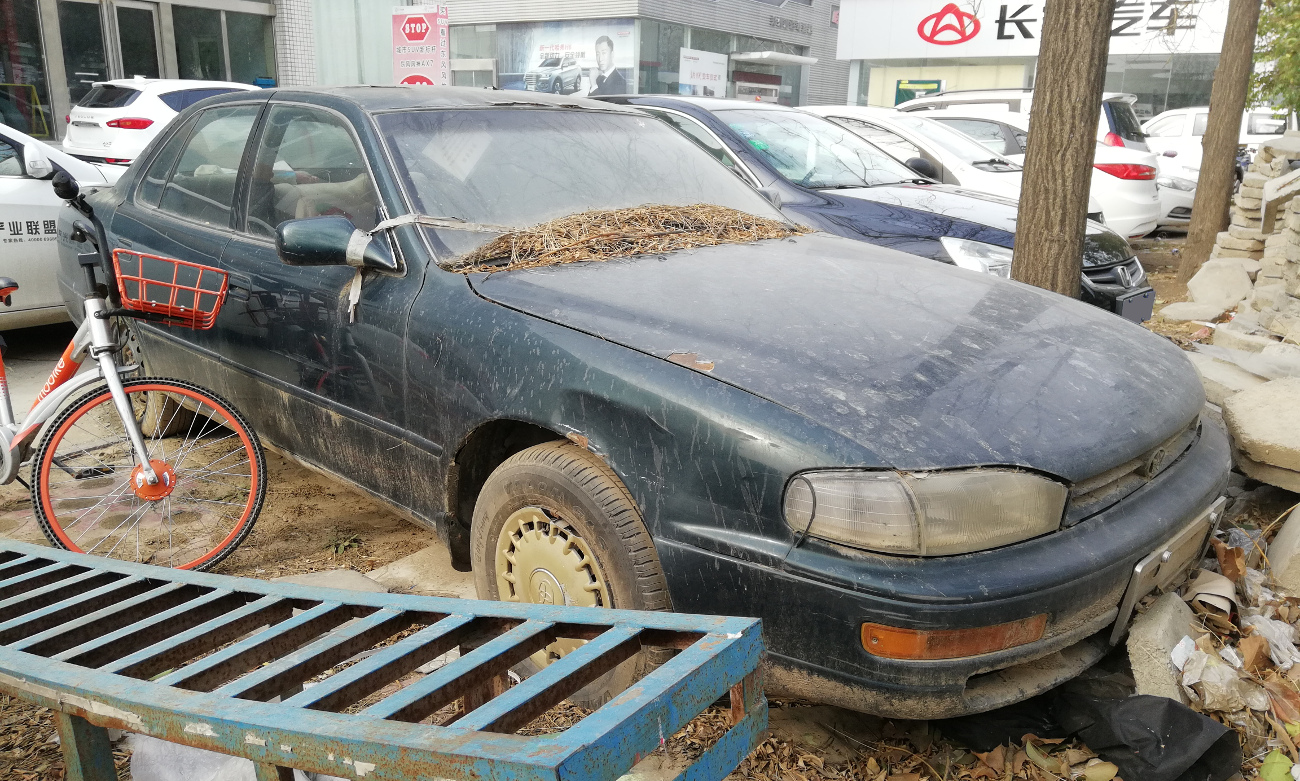
Xinkai HXK6630 (a "license-built" Toyota Camry: imported fully built-up and fitted with Xinkai badging)

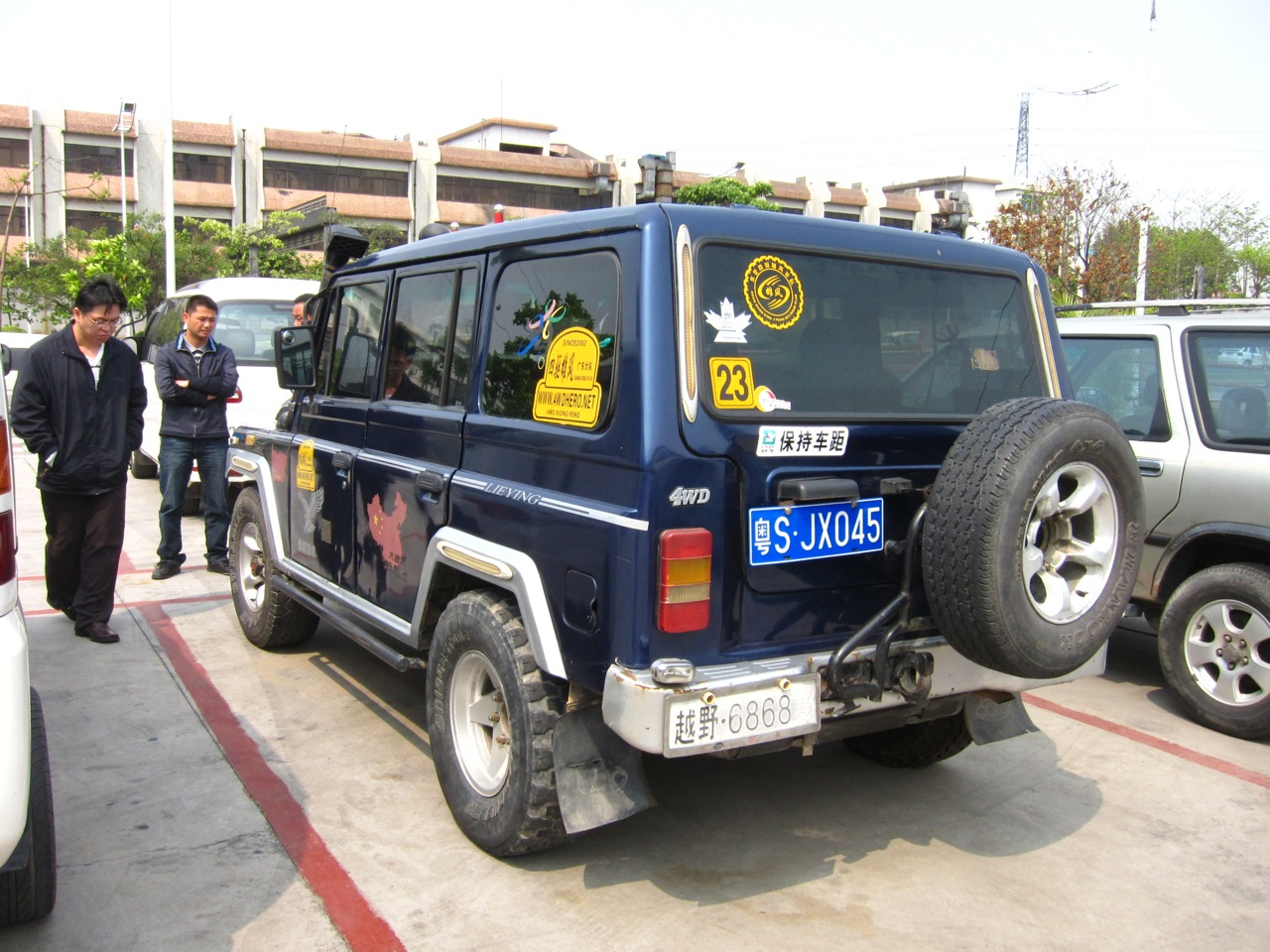
Xinkai Lieying HXK2021TPE, a copy of the Beijing BJ2024Z

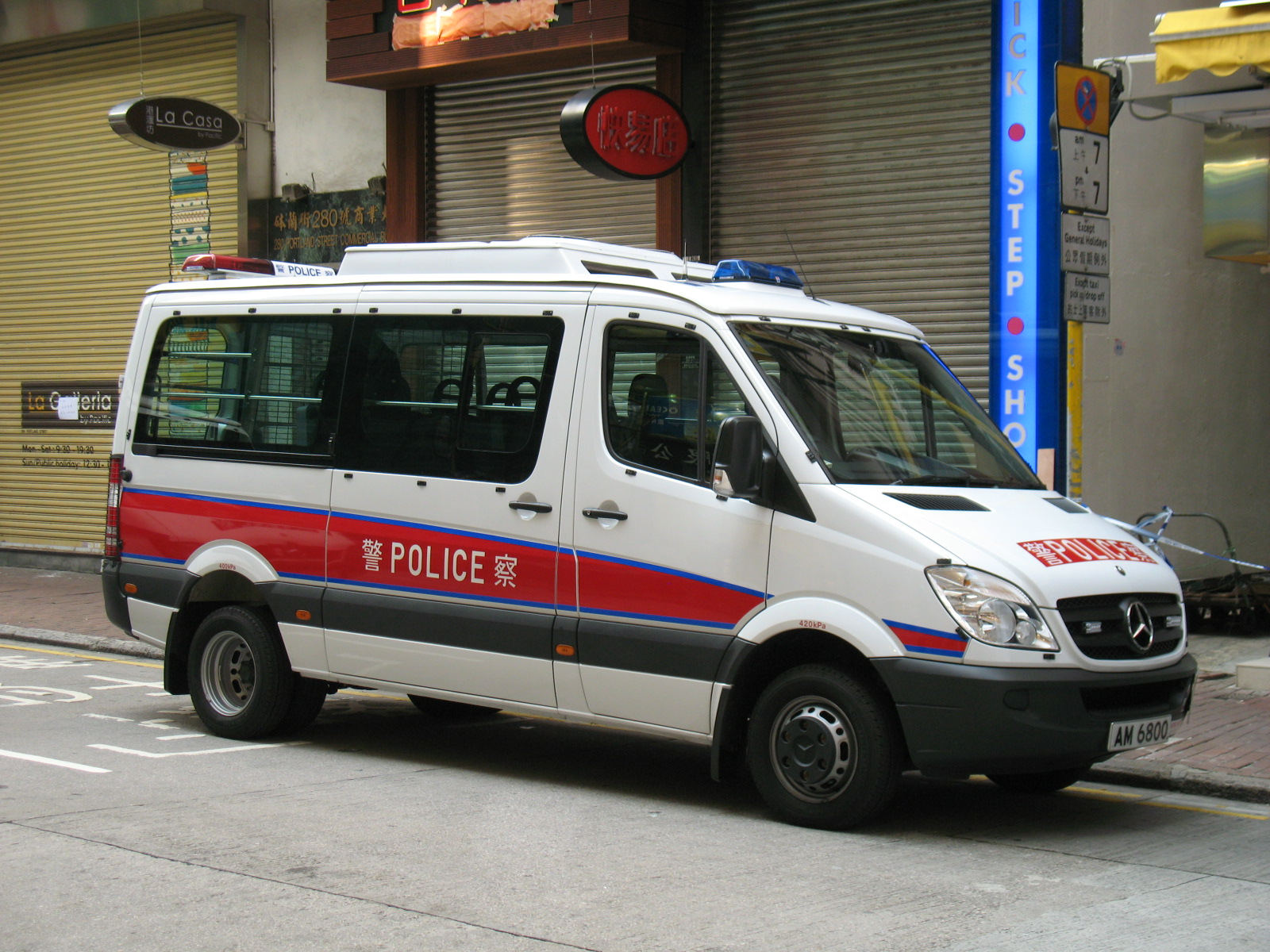
A Mercedes-Benz Police Car manufactured by Xinkai Auto in Hong Kong
(2nd Generation)

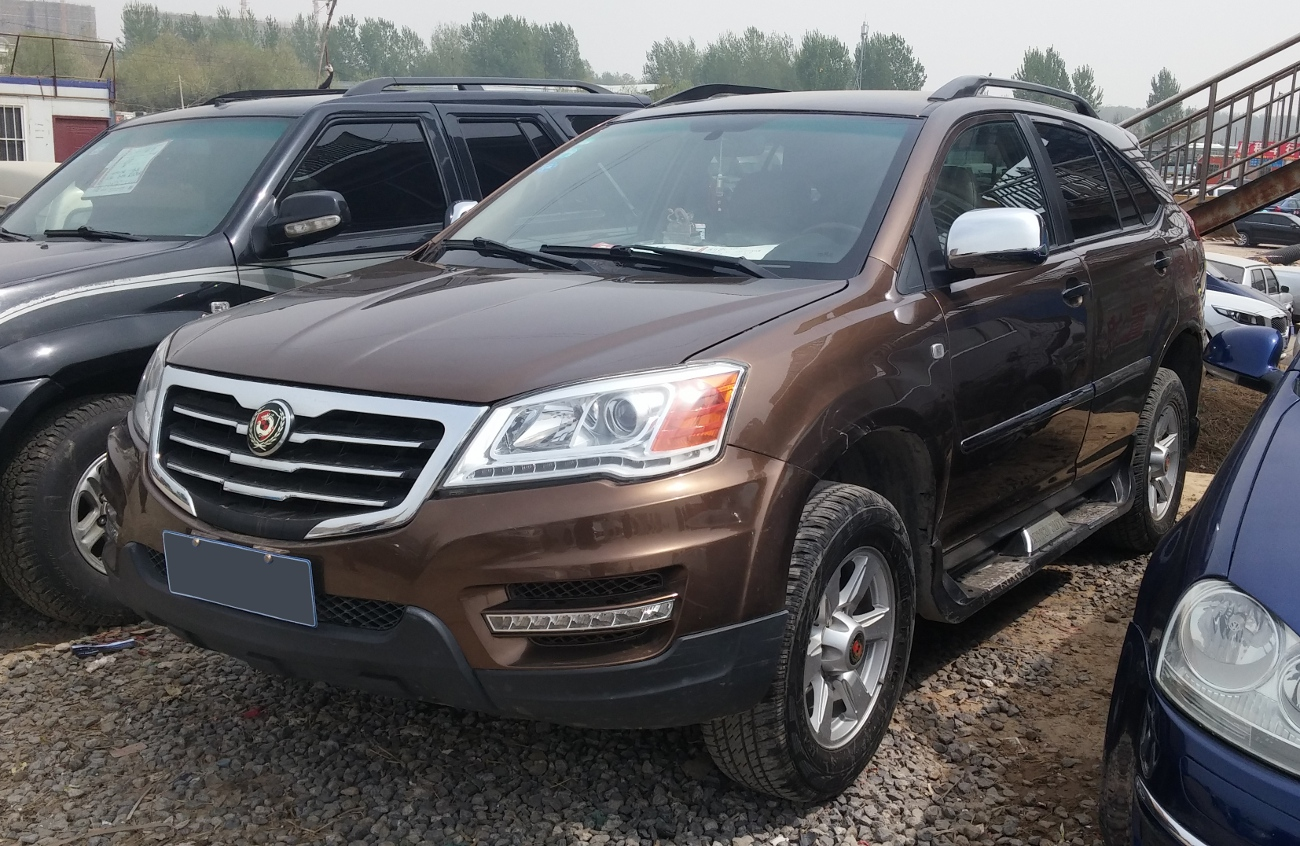
Xinkai Victory (HXK6480)

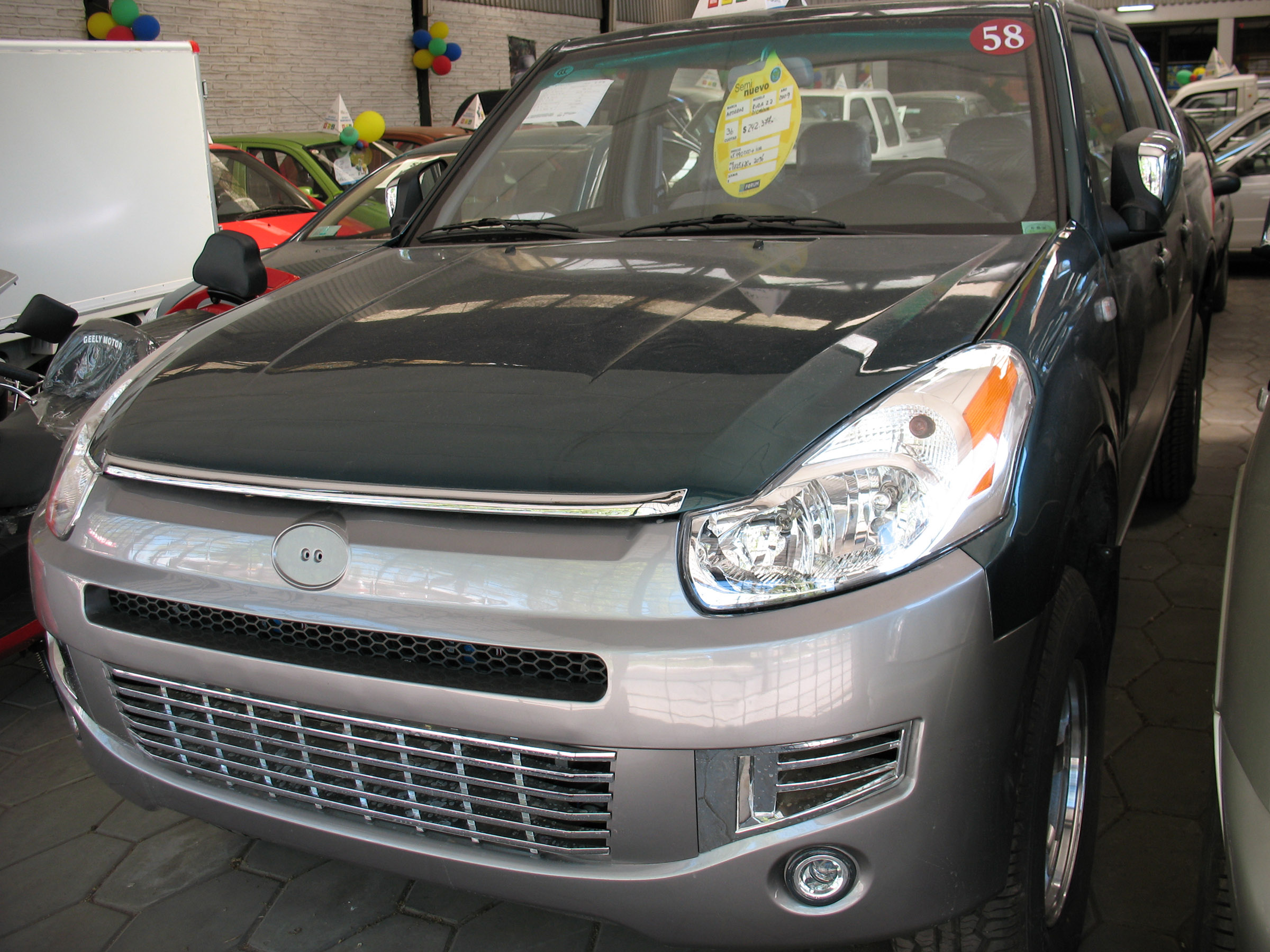
Xinkai Ruida Pickup (Autorrad Ruda)

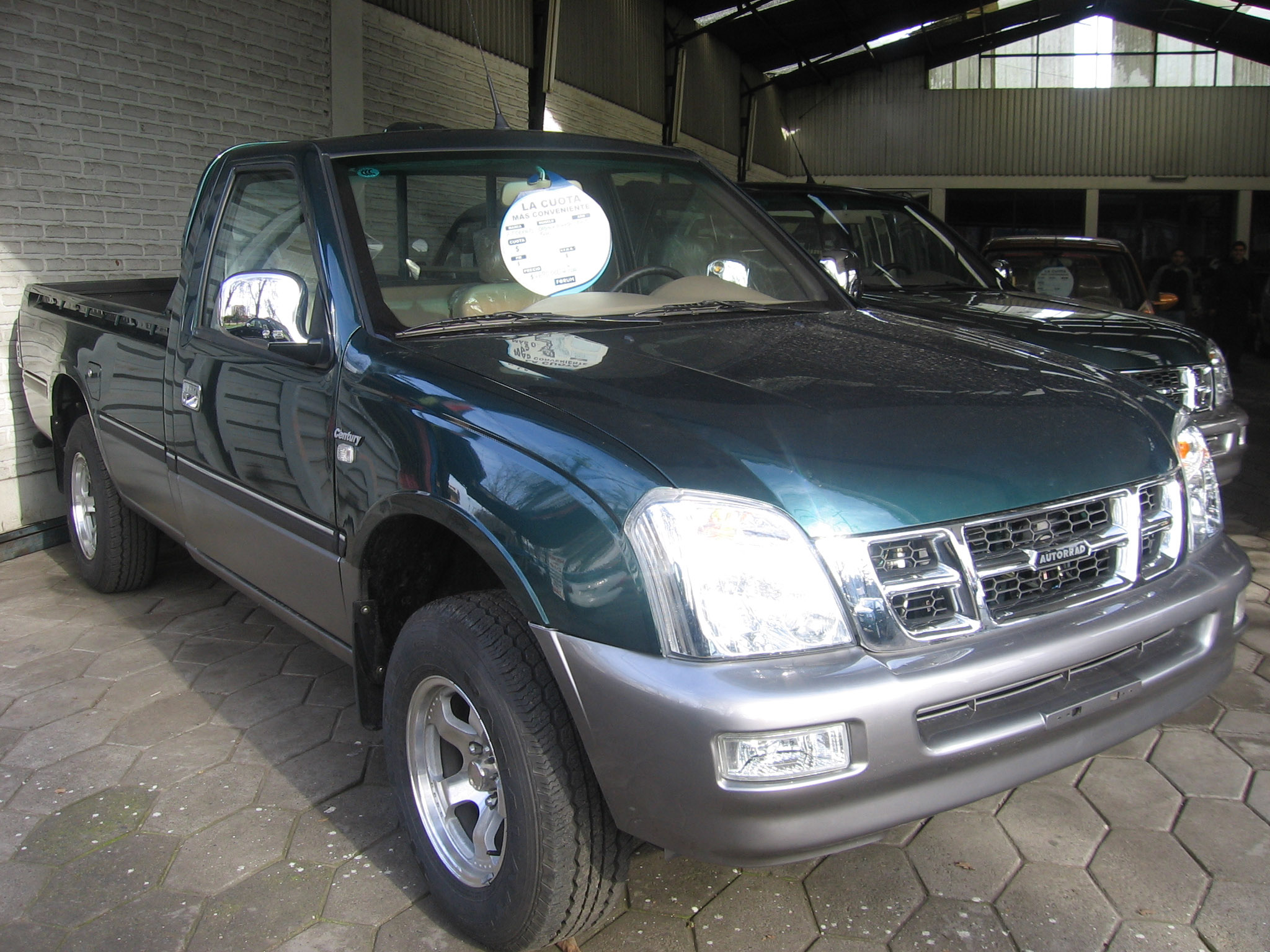
Xinkai pickup (Autorrad Century)
