= Xinkai Victory =

Chinese SUV

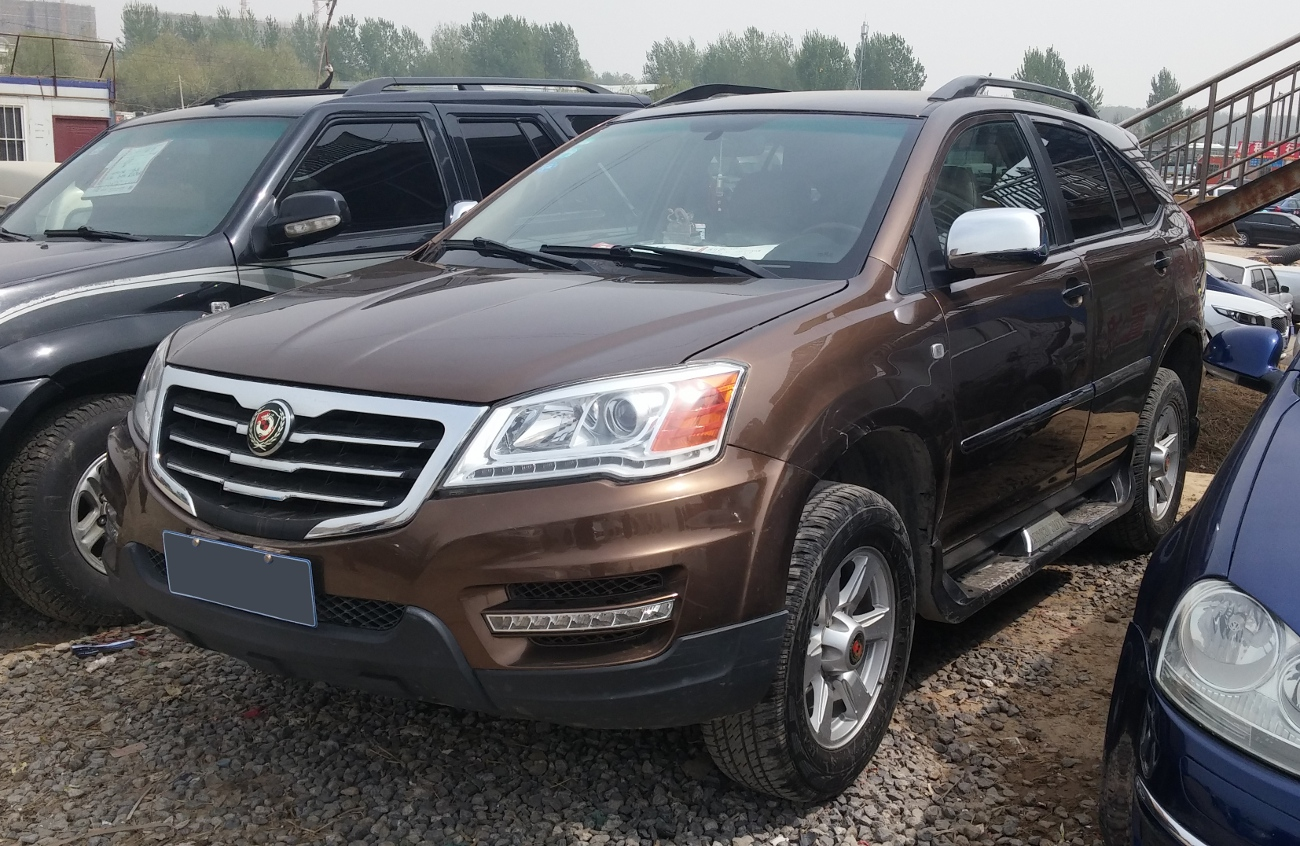
- Second generation Xinkai Victory HXK6480

Overview
- Manufacturer: Xinkai
- Also called: Xinkai Kaisheng (凯胜)

Body and chassis
- Class: Mid-size SUV
- Body style: 5-door SUV
- Layout: Front-engine, rear-wheel drive

Powertrain
- Engine: 2.0 L I4 Petrol engine; 2.4 L I4 Petrol engine
- Transmission: 6-speed manual transmission

Dimensions
- Wheelbase: 2,710 mm (106.7 in)
- Length: 4,730 mm (186.2 in)
- Width: 1,860 mm (73.2 in)
- Height: 1,740 mm (68.5 in)
- Curb weight: 1690kg

The Xinkai Victory (Chinese: 新凯 凯胜}) is a mid-size SUV produced and sold by Xinkai.

== Overview ==
The second generation Xinkai Victory was revealed in July 2013, and was essentially a facelift of the first generation Xinkai Victory with a price range from 108,000 yuan to 129,800 yuan before discontinuation.

Despite the crossover-looking exterior, the Xinkai Victory was built on a rear wheel drive body on frame chassis and is therefore a sports utility vehicle and not a crossover. The engine options of the Xinkai Victory include a 2.0 liter petrol engine producing 122hp (90kW) at 5250rpm and a torque of 170Nm, and a 2.4 liter petrol engine producing 136hp (100kW) and a torque of 200Nm with both engines mated to a 6-speed manual gearbox.

The styling of the Xinkai Victory was especially controversial due to the exterior design being a complete copy of the second generation Lexus RX luxury crossover.

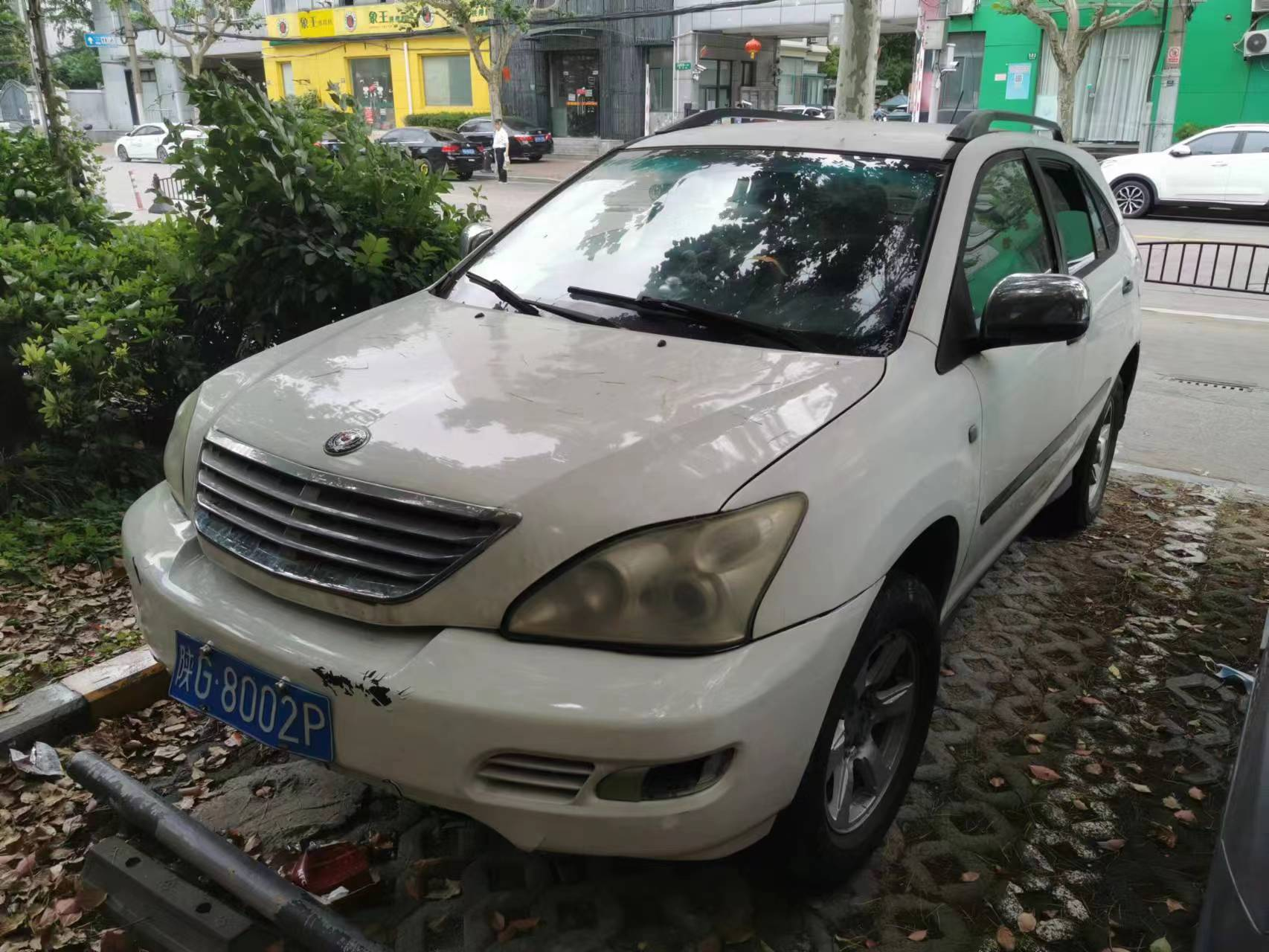
Early version of the Xinkai Victory

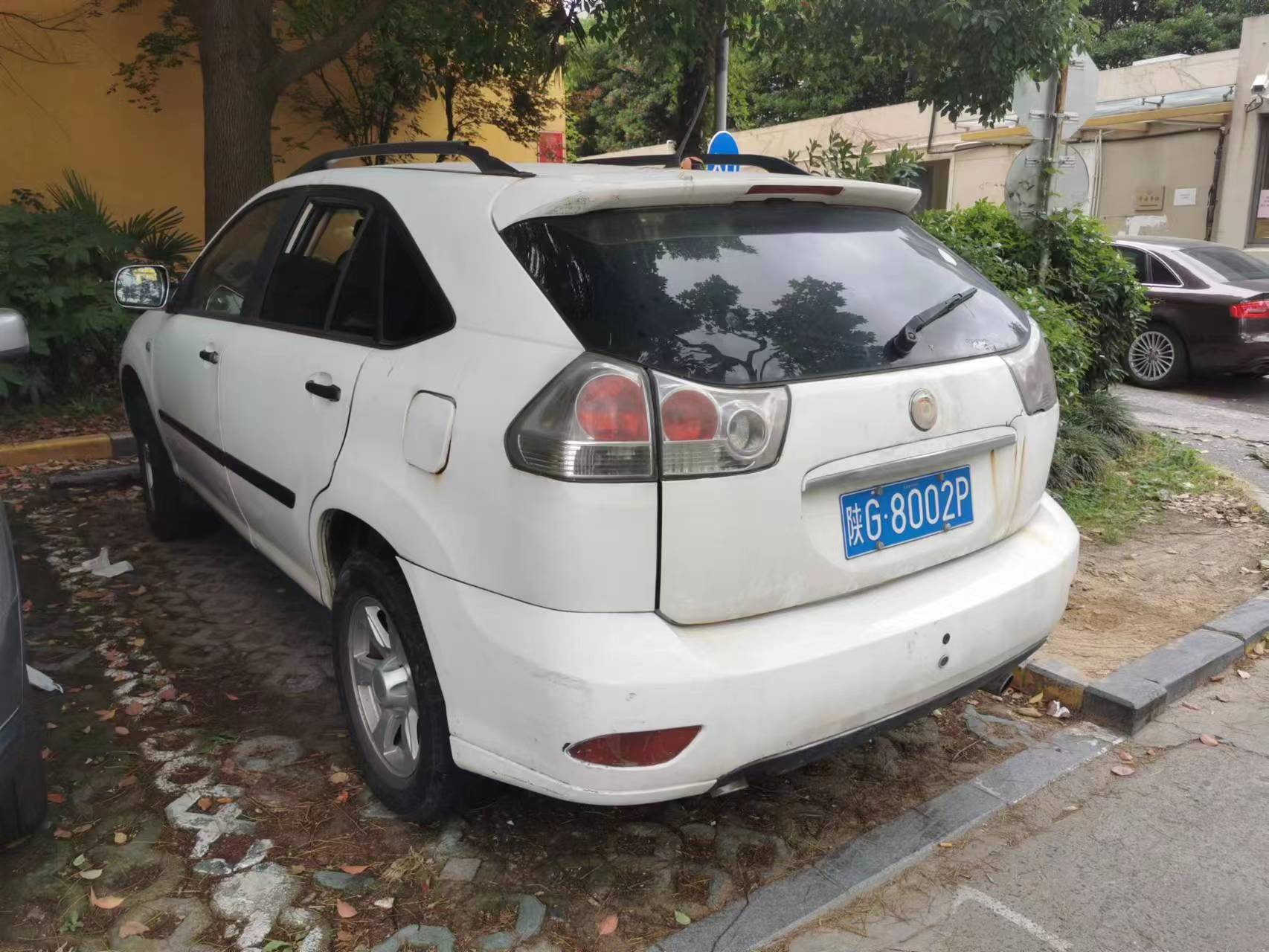
Rear view
