= Mudflap girl =

Iconic symbol appearing on many vehicle mud flaps

Mudflap girl

Mudflap girl is a silhouette of a woman with an hourglass body shape, sitting, leaning back on her hands, with her hair being blown in the wind. The image was created in the 1970s and was popularized on mudflaps. Subsequently, it went on to be featured on other American trucking accessories as well as on clothing, jewelry, and personal accessories.

== Creation ==
This image was originally believed to be modeled on Leta Laroe, a famous exotic dancer at the time. However, it is more likely that the design is based on Rachel Ann Allen, created by Bill Zinda in Long Beach, California, for his friend Stewart Allen.

== Mudflap Girl: the play ==
The stage production Mudflap Girl by Sya Sen, premiered in 2023 and is described as "A salute to her story." The show explores the image of mudflap girl as it is seen through the eyes of people who have lived in different decades since the inception of the character. This includes a 1970s trucker, a 1980s homemaker, a 1990s feminist, a 2000s pragmatist, a 2010s cynic, and a 2020s optimist. The show also features the character of mudflap girl herself.

The author was keen to tell the story of the mudflap girl but wanted to remain respectful to Rachel Ann Allen whose health was in decline. She accomplished this by having fictional characters with preconceptions share a personal reaction to the image. The character of mudflap girl herself tells a short story of her origin based on legend and lore.

== Public service ==
In 2007 the Wyoming State Library implemented a targeted marketing initiative featuring mudflap girl. This six-month effort featured a silhouette of a nude woman reading a book—a more subdued version of the iconic image often seen on truck mudflaps. With a budget of under $3,000, the campaign distributed mudflap girl stickers and posters to mechanic shops, auto parts stores, and libraries, according to Tina Lackey, the library's marketing manager. The aim was to reach a new audience, specifically men working in automotive fields—by promoting the state's free online database of repair manuals. "It was a way to market to a demographic we don't typically see using the library," Lackey explained. Library officials report that the campaign was a success.

== In popular culture ==
The image of mudflap girl appears in many forms of popular media. Sometimes it is simply a nostalgic image on clothing or in jewelry, and other times variations of the image are used for fun or a critical commentary.

Heather Joseph-Witham, a folklorist who teaches at Otis College of Art and Design and who has also debunked urban legends for Mythbusters, asked "Regardless of the precise truth of the narrative, the important issue here is: Why is this image so ubiquitous?". To her, the mudflap girl is quintessentially American. "Why do so many people feel the need to display it? What does it say about us?"

== Variations ==
The image is also referred to as trucker girl or seated lady. Over the decades there have been many variations upon the original image including women portrayed with different and more diverse body types. There are numerous variations on the original image including:

- Angel & Devil – Back to back, two girls, one with angel wings and halo and the other with devil horns, tail and pitchfork
- Bride of Frankenstein – Sporting a trademark hairstyle, different than Original MudflapGirl
- Chicken – Mudflap girl as a chicken was used in the Wacky Package "Perdude Chicken", parodying Perdue Farms.
- Cowgirl – Wearing a Stetson
- Curvy Girl – Having a much fuller figure than the original
- Elita One – In issue #4 of the Dreamwave Productions comic Transformers: The War Within, Optimus Prime is portrayed as having a mudflap with the silhouette of Elita One.
- Flipping Off – The feminist blog Feministing used as its logo an ironic version of mudflap girl holding up her middle finger.
- Megaphone – The "Feministas" protest group in Futurama: Into the Wild Green Yonder has a similar logo in pink that has mudflap girl using a megaphone.
- Reading – Wyoming Libraries use mudflap girl holding a book, in an effort to attract readers.
- Space Invader – Wearing a helmet and holding a raygun
- Trucker – Silhouette stickers of a chubby male with a beer belly are also available.
