= Shower splash guard =

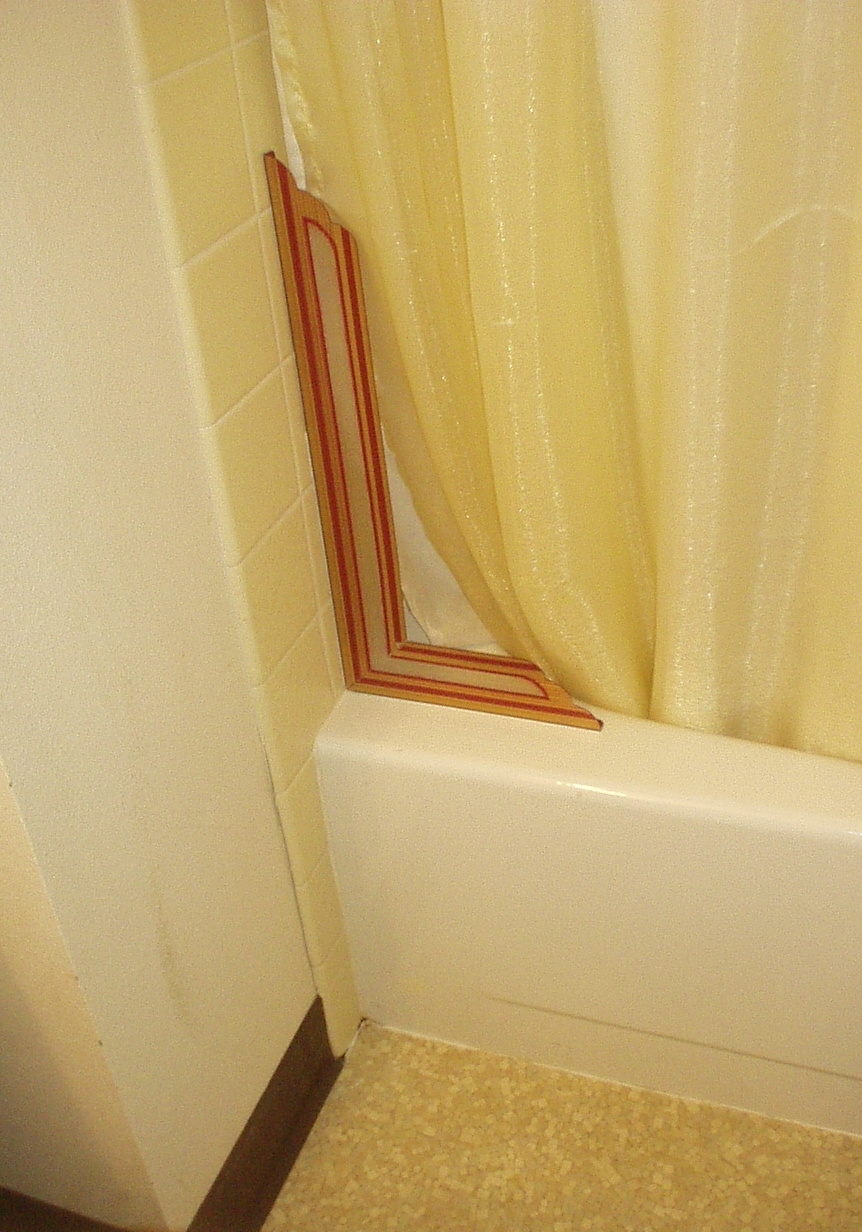
Shower Splash Guard Installed

A shower splash guard is a permanently installed, fixed, rigid fitting made of plastic or glass that prevent water from a shower from splashing out of the bathtub and onto the floor. Typically, the shower splash guard is a small triangular piece of plastic that is used in combination with a shower curtain, to prevent water escaping at the corners, but it may be a much larger piece that is used by itself.

== Typical design and use ==
They are commonly installed on rectangular drop-in bathtubs with a shower head combination. In this arrangement, the bathtub is installed tightly against three walls, which are often covered with ceramic tiles. The bathtub and walls are sealed along the tub and wall abutment with a flexible caulk and rigid grout is used between the tiles to contain all water. The most common North American configuration is a rectangular drop-in bathtub/shower which is 5 foot in length and approximately 32 inch in width, having a shower head, water spout, taps, over flow drain, and bottom drain on one of the 32 inch ends.

The remaining fourth side is used for entry and exit by the user, for the purpose of showering or bathing, and is fitted with a device to prevent the shower head from spraying water outside the tub.

Most shower splash guard designs are based on a right triangle, where the 90 degree legs are attached to the wall and tub ledge. The right triangle design functions well when the bathtub and walls are installed perfectly square with each other. Some extend as much as 4 feet up the wall, and are held in position using adhesive foam tapes or glues.

Generally, shower splash guards are made from plastic and function as a dam to prevent water from escaping the bathtub and pooling on the floor. These devices are installed to fill the intersecting void between the top ledge of the bathtub and the perpendicular wall.

== Relationship to bathtub or shower curtains and doors ==
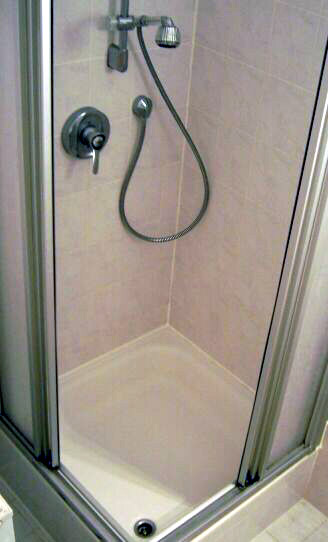
Shower door.

Other common devices for containing water spray include a highly flexible, waterproof bathtub or shower curtain, or more recently, a shower door, which is a permanently installed sliding or pivoting door made from glass or plastic. Containing water spray, leaks, and splashes within the bathtub is particularly important in bathrooms constructed with wooden under-flooring because water causes the wooden floor boards and floor joists to rot or decay over time, if left unattended.

Shower or bathtub curtains are more commonly installed because of their very low cost and ease of installation, requiring only a rod, which may be removable, that spans between the end walls of the open side of the bathtub, and rings or hooks for attaching the curtain. The waterproof curtain or liner is placed inside the bathtub during and after shower use to contain water spray and splashes within the bathtub for proper drainage while drying. However, they are not highly effective: if the curtain is not very carefully arranged, then water escapes and puddles on the floor, near the wall at the end of the shower curtain, particularly at the end where the shower head was located.

The shower splash guard is designed to solve the problem of containing water, mostly at the shower head end of the bathtub. Like the shower curtain, it dates back to the early 1900s.

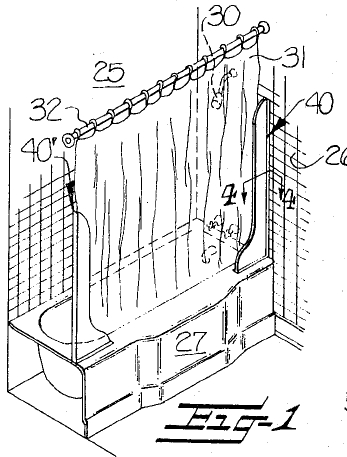
USPTO: #3,855,642

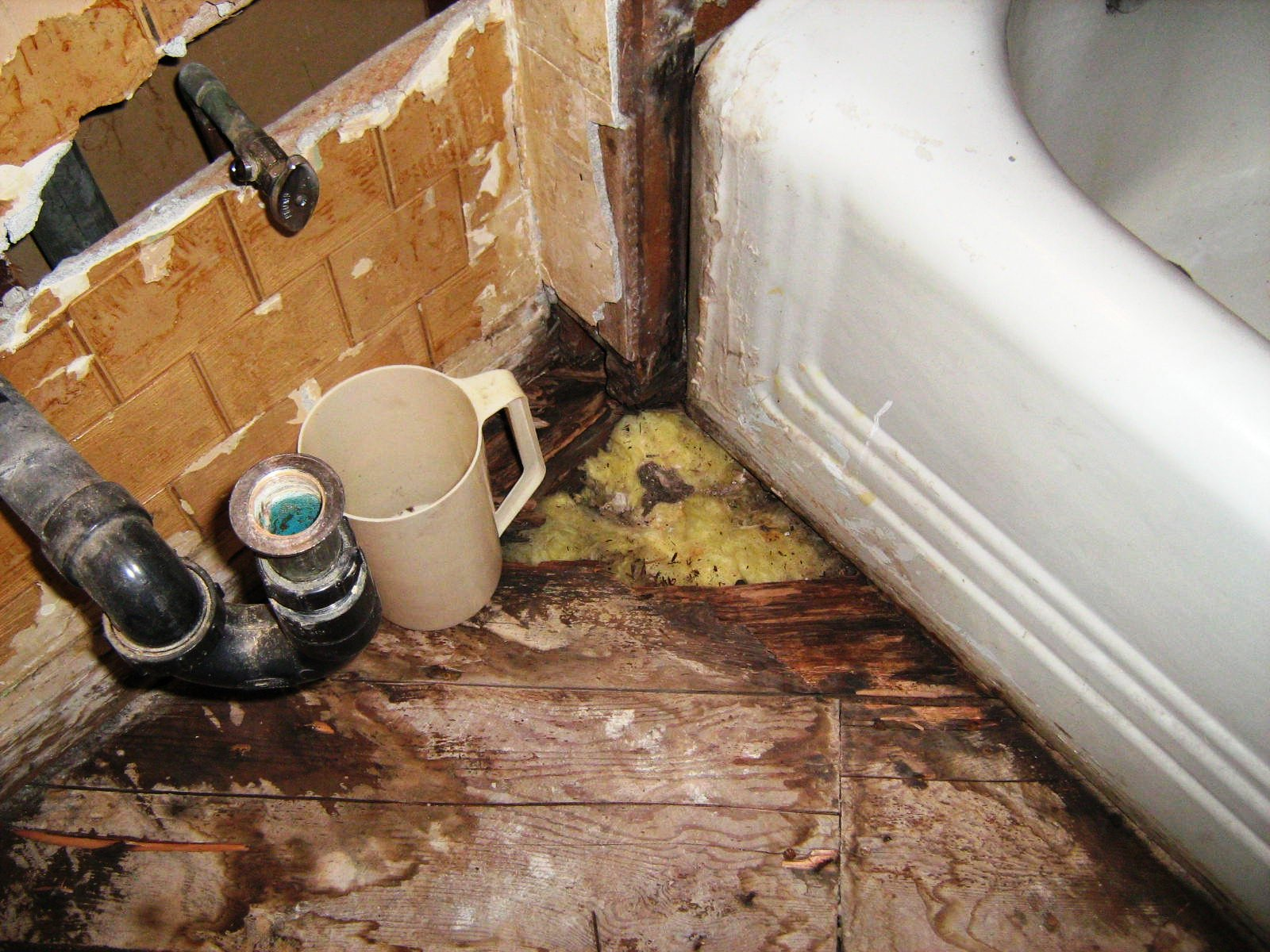
Bathroom Floor Damage
