= Splatter guard =

Device used to prevent hot oil from spraying

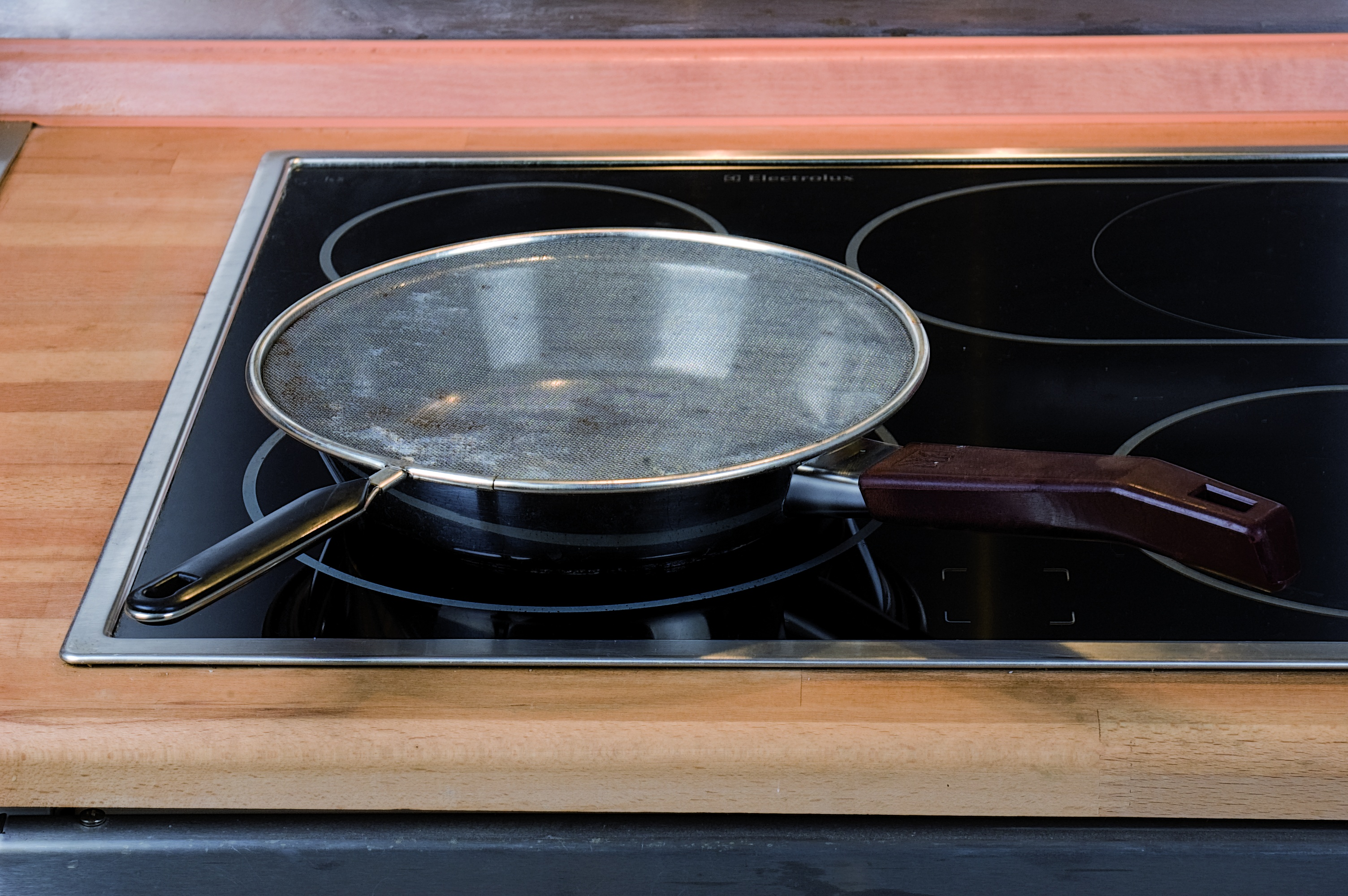
A metal splatter guard on a frying pan

A splatter guard (or spatter guard) is a device placed over a frying pan to prevent hot oil from spitting out of the pan, which often happens when pan frying at a high temperature. This has two main purposes: droplets of hot oil can cause dangerous burns if they land on the skin, and, if they land elsewhere, can cause stains. Splatter guards are generally circular, so as to fit the shape of a frying pan, and have a handle for ease of removal and safety. They are normally made of a fine metal mesh or a metal sheet with numerous small holes, to allow steam to exit the pan but not oil. Other designs exist, such as the cone-shaped silicone Frywall, which allows for stirring and flipping while the food cooks.
