= Mudflap =

Vehicle accessory

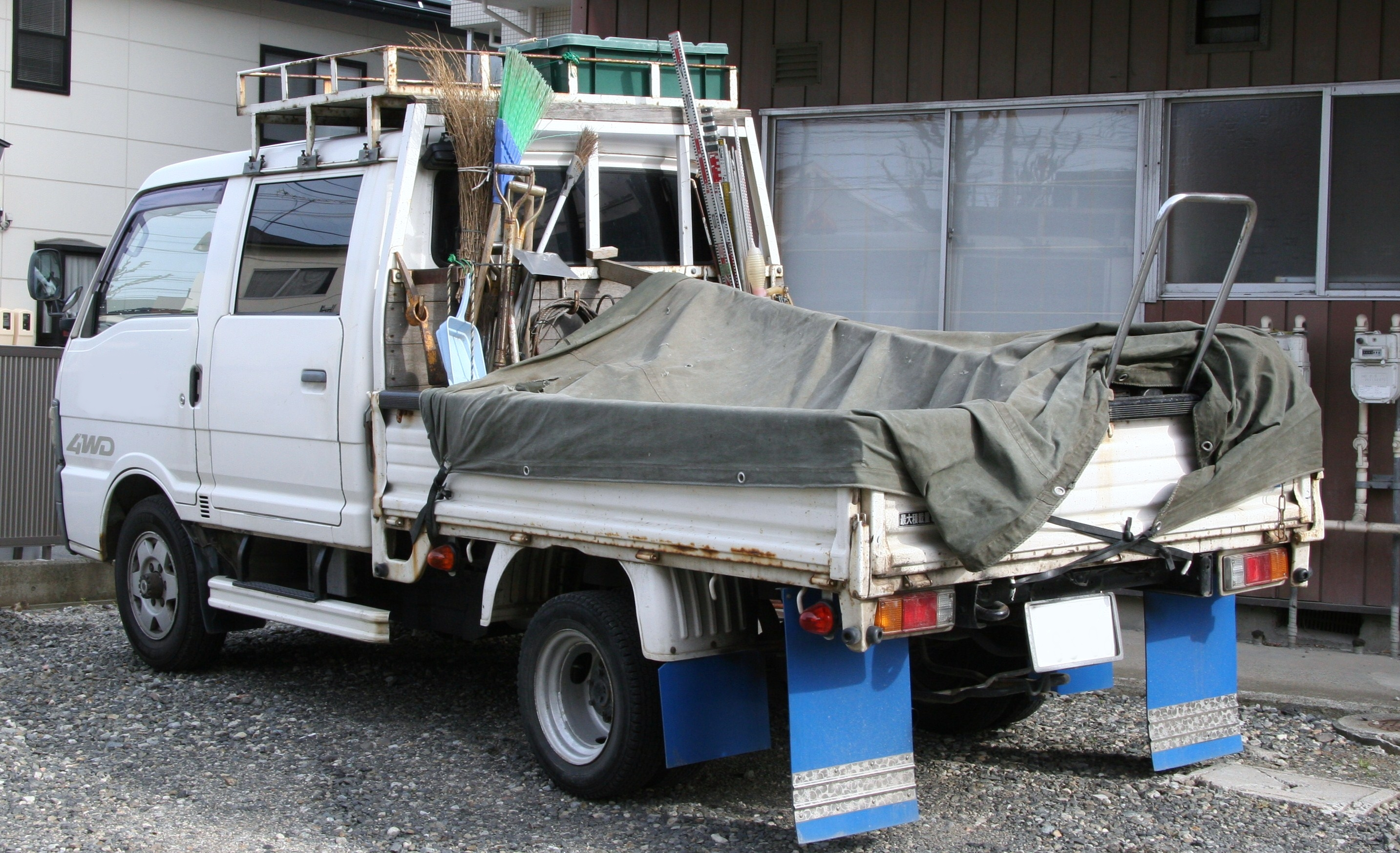
Truck with bright blue mud flaps on the rear wheel wells and bumper.

A mudflap, mud guard, or rally flap is used in combination with the vehicle fender to protect the vehicle, passengers, other vehicles, and pedestrians from mud and other flying debris thrown into the air by a rotating tire on a wheeled vehicle. A mudflap is typically made from a flexible material such as rubber that is not easily damaged by contact with flying debris, the tire, or the road surface.

On bicycles, a mudflap is called a "spoiler".

Mudflaps can be large rectangular sheets suspended behind the tires, or may be small molded lips below the rear of the vehicle's wheel wells. Mudflaps can be aerodynamically engineered, utilizing shaping, louvers, or vents to improve airflow and to lower drag.

While some flaps are plain, in the colour of rubber, many contain company logos, other art, or advertisements. One common feature is the mudflap girl, a woman's silhouette.

In the United States, mudflap regulations vary from state to state.

== Aerodynamics ==
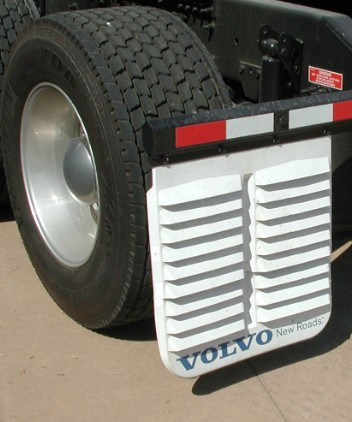
Aerodynamic louvered mudflap

Aerodynamic mudflaps are engineered with louvers or ventilated slats to improve airflow, reduce sidespray, and decrease aerodynamic drag, to improve fuel efficiency.

Supercomputing technology applied to the problem of semi-trailer truck drag has helped to validate such aerodynamic improvements. Traditional solid truck mudflaps can increase drag, but a study by the UT-Chattanooga SimCenter indicated slatted mudflaps can reduce drag more than 8 percent, making the truck's drag coefficient comparable to one without any mudflaps.

A further advantage of the design is the heat-venting capacity of aerodynamically optimized mudflaps. The improved airflow promotes the quick release of otherwise recirculated water and air from the fenderwell while improving performance by cooling the tires and brakes.

== See also ==
- Bibb v. Navajo Freight Lines, Inc.
- Fender (vehicle)
- Parlok
- Pickup truck
