= Toyota Australia =

Motor manufacturer

Toyota Motor Corporation Australia Ltd.
- Type: Subsidiary
- Industry: Automotive
- Founded: 1958
- Headquarters: Port Melbourne, Victoria, Australia
- Key people: Max Yasuda (Chairman); Matthew Callachor (CEO and President)
- Parent: Toyota
- Website: www.toyota.com.au

Toyota Australia is an Australian subsidiary of the Japanese car manufacturer Toyota. It markets Toyota products and manages motorsport, advertising and business operations for Toyota in Australia. It is also responsible for Lexus vehicles in Australia.

Toyota Australia is based in Port Melbourne, with offices in Adelaide, Perth, Sydney, Brisbane, Townsville and Darwin.

Toyota Australia manufactured cars locally from 1963 until 2017.

== History ==
Toyota Australia commenced operations in 1959, when Toyota Land Cruisers were imported by Thiess Toyota, a 60/40 joint venture between Thiess and Toyota, for the Snowy Mountains Scheme. By 1963, assembly of Toyota vehicles in Australia by Australian Motor Industries (AMI) had begun, taking place at the production plant in Port Melbourne. The production line of Toyota vehicles in 1963 was devoted to the Toyota Tiara.

In 1972 Toyota bought out British Leyland's interest in AMI and announced plans to spend $127 million on an engine and gearbox plant.

The Toyota Australia Altona Plant was established and began the production of engines in 1978, following the progressive growth of AMI. In 1980, Toyota exercised an option to buy Thiess' share of Thiess Toyota. After Toyota's products came in for heavy criticism regarding their handling, a handling package developed specifically for the Australian market was introduced in 1981. The first AMI exported car was a Toyota Corona wagon in 1986 headed for New Zealand.

In 1983, Toyota Australia launched an Australian version of the jingle "Oh, what a feeling", which had been used in the US before; it is still used today.

In 1987, under the leadership of Robert Johnston, Toyota Australia and Holden formed United Australian Automobile Industries in response to the Button car plan. This resulted in Toyota Australia building Holden Apollos and Holden Novas at Altona that were badge engineered Camrys and Corollas. In exchange Holden built Toyota Lexcens which were rebadged Holden Commodores.

The one-millionth locally built Toyota was produced in 1992. In 1994, all vehicle manufacturing operations were moved from Port Melbourne to Altona. The last vehicle produced at the Port Melbourne plant was a Toyota Camry and the first vehicle produced at the Altona plant was a Toyota Corolla. Port Melbourne continued performing minor operations.

The two-millionth locally built Toyota was produced in 2004. In 2005, the ten-millionth worldwide Camry was built at Altona. The complete closure and end of all Toyota production operations at the Port Melbourne plant took place in May 2006. All manufacturing was shifted to Altona. The milestone of the 500,000th Toyota Australia vehicle export also occurred in May 2006. The vehicle was a Toyota Camry, headed for New Zealand. The one-millionth export was reached in August 2012.

Many Toyota vehicles have been built at either Altona or Port Melbourne, including the Tiara, Corona, Crown, Corolla, Camry and Avalon. The Toyota Land Cruiser was never built in Australia.

As of 2006, Altona produced the Camry. Production of the Avalon has ceased, due for replacement on the manufacturing line by the Toyota Aurion, which shares many components with the Camry. Production of the Camry Hybrid began in 2010 after a $35 million subsidy was secured from the federal government. The first locally made Australian Toyota Hybrid Camry was completed and revealed to public on 11 December 2009, driven by Prime Minister Kevin Rudd.

In February 2014, it was announced Toyota would cease manufacturing vehicles and engines in Australia by the end of 2017. The decision was based on the unfavourable Australian dollar making exports not viable, the high cost of local manufacture and the high amount of competition in a relatively small local market. The company consolidated its corporate functions in Melbourne at the end of 2017 when its Sales & Marketing operation relocated from Woolooware Bay, Sydney. Head office (CHQ) remained in Port Melbourne and the Altona plant was retained for other functions including a Centre of Excellence and vehicle proving facility known as the Autodrome. The workforce was expected to be reduced from 3,900 to 1,300.

== Manufacturing ==
Toyota built cars in Victoria, Australia between 1963 and 2017.

The Altona factory would build three models—Camry, Camry Hybrid and Aurion—for domestic and export customers.

In February 2014, Toyota Australia announced its decision to close its manufacturing plant by the end of 2017 and become a national sales and distribution company.

Toyota vehicles built in Australia:

- Toyota Tiara: 1963–1965
- Toyota Crown: 1966–1980
- Toyota Corona: 1965–1987
- Toyota Camry: 1987–2017
- Toyota Corolla: 1968–1999
- Holden Apollo: 1989–1996
- Holden Nova: 1989–1996
- Toyota Lexcen: 1989–1996
- Toyota Avalon: 2000–2005
- Toyota Aurion: 2006–2017
- Toyota Camry Hybrid: 2009–2017

=== Altona plant ===
The Toyota Australia Altona Plant manufacturing facility operated in the Melbourne suburb of Altona. It opened in 1994, replacing the previous Port Melbourne site, but closed in 2017. The plant produced the Camry and Aurion for sale locally in Australasia and for export to the Middle East, as well as the Corolla until the switch to the fully imported 8th Generation. Until the early 2000s, export to East and Southeast Asia also occurred. The plant also manufactured the Avalon between 2000 and 2005.

In December 2009, full-scale production of the new Australian Camry Hybrid commenced. On 11 December 2009, manufacture of the first locally made Camry Hybrid was completed and revealed to the public, writing a new page in the history of the Australian automotive industry.

In April 2012, Toyota retrenched 350 workers. Toyota received criticism for the manner in which the process was carried out; for example, deploying security guards to escort sacked staff.

The plant closed on 3 October 2017, marking the end of Toyota's automobile manufacturing in Australia.

In March 2019, Toyota announced plans to build a Hydrogen Centre at Altona partly funded by the Australian Renewable Energy Agency (ARENA) with existing infrastructure to be repurposed. The Hydrogen Centre was commissioned on 29 March 2021 and incorporates a commercial-grade hydrogen production, storage and refuelling facility together with an education centre and a service facility for a Toyota Mirai fuel cell electric vehicle (FCEV) demonstration fleet. The facility has the capacity to produce up to 80kg of hydrogen per day by electrolysis of water with a 200kW electrolyser using electricity from a 87kW solar panel, a 100kW battery storage or from the power grid. The hydrogen refuelling station will be the first to be made available to the public in Victoria. The Centre also has a 30kW fuel cell to convert the stored hydrogen into electricity for backup power and to feed into the mains grid. The education centre had earlier been completed in April 2020.

The centre will support the newly imported second generation Toyota Mirai released in Australia in April 2021 with an initial allocation of 20 vehicles for organizations and business. Toyota previously imported 10 first generation Mirai that were used in a loan program between 2018 and 2019 with a portable refuelling station developed in 2016 that was transportable on a Hino 700 truck to refuel the Mirai.

== Sales ==
Toyota Australia has held the largest market share of Australia's new car market for eighteen consecutive years from 2003 to 2020.

Year	Units sold	Sales rank	Reference
2003	186,370	1	
2004	201,737	1	
2005	202,817	1	
2006	213,847	1	
2007	236,647	1	
2008	238,983	1	
2009	200,991	1	
2010	214,718	1	
2011	181,624	1	
2012	218,176	1	
2013	214,630	1	
2014	203,501	1	
2015	206,236	1	
2016	209,610	1	
2017	216,566	1	
2018	217,061	1	
2019	205,766	1	
2020	204,801	1	

Above figures exclude Lexus sales.

== Lineup ==
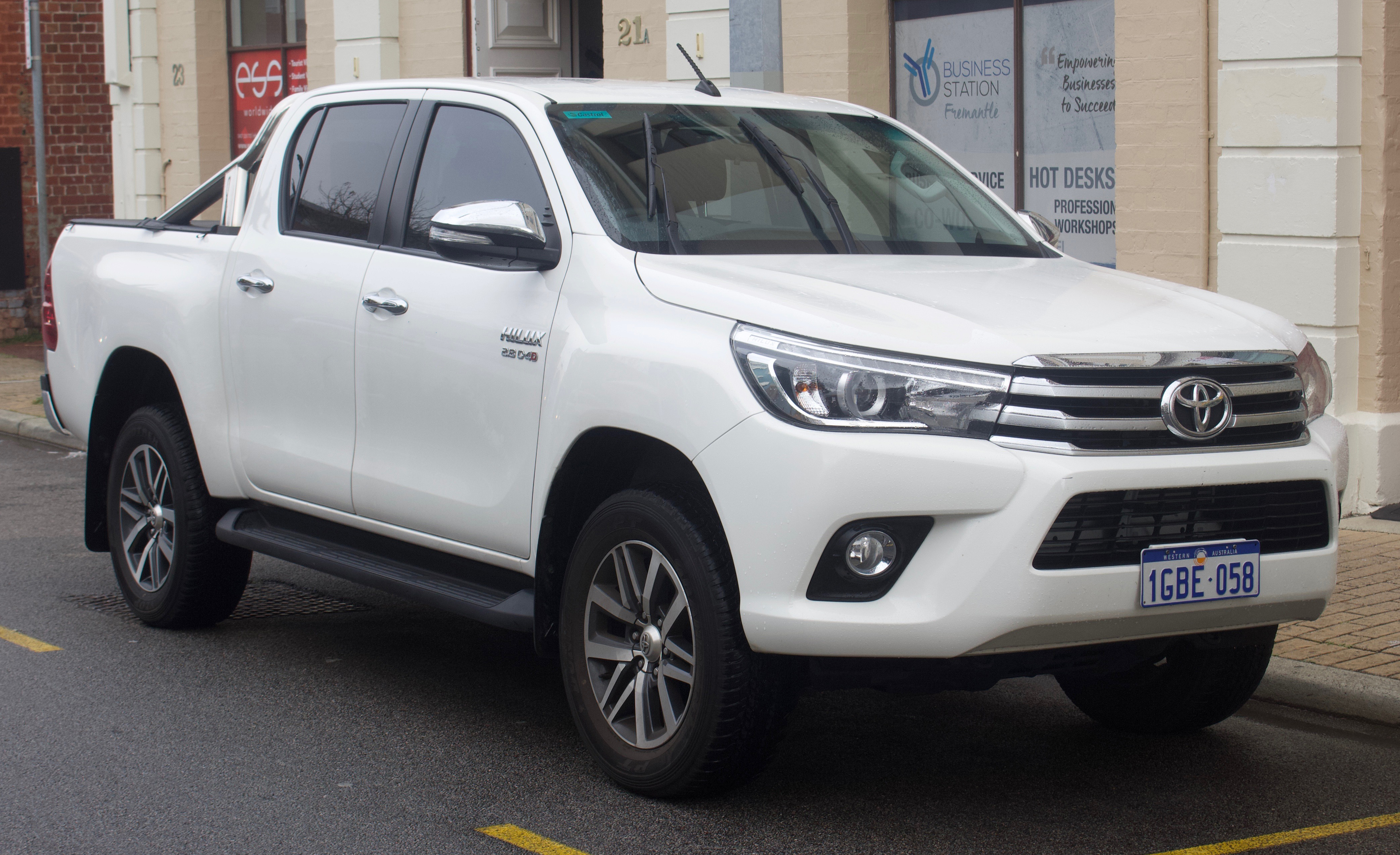
Toyota Hilux, Australia's top selling vehicle from 2016 to 2020

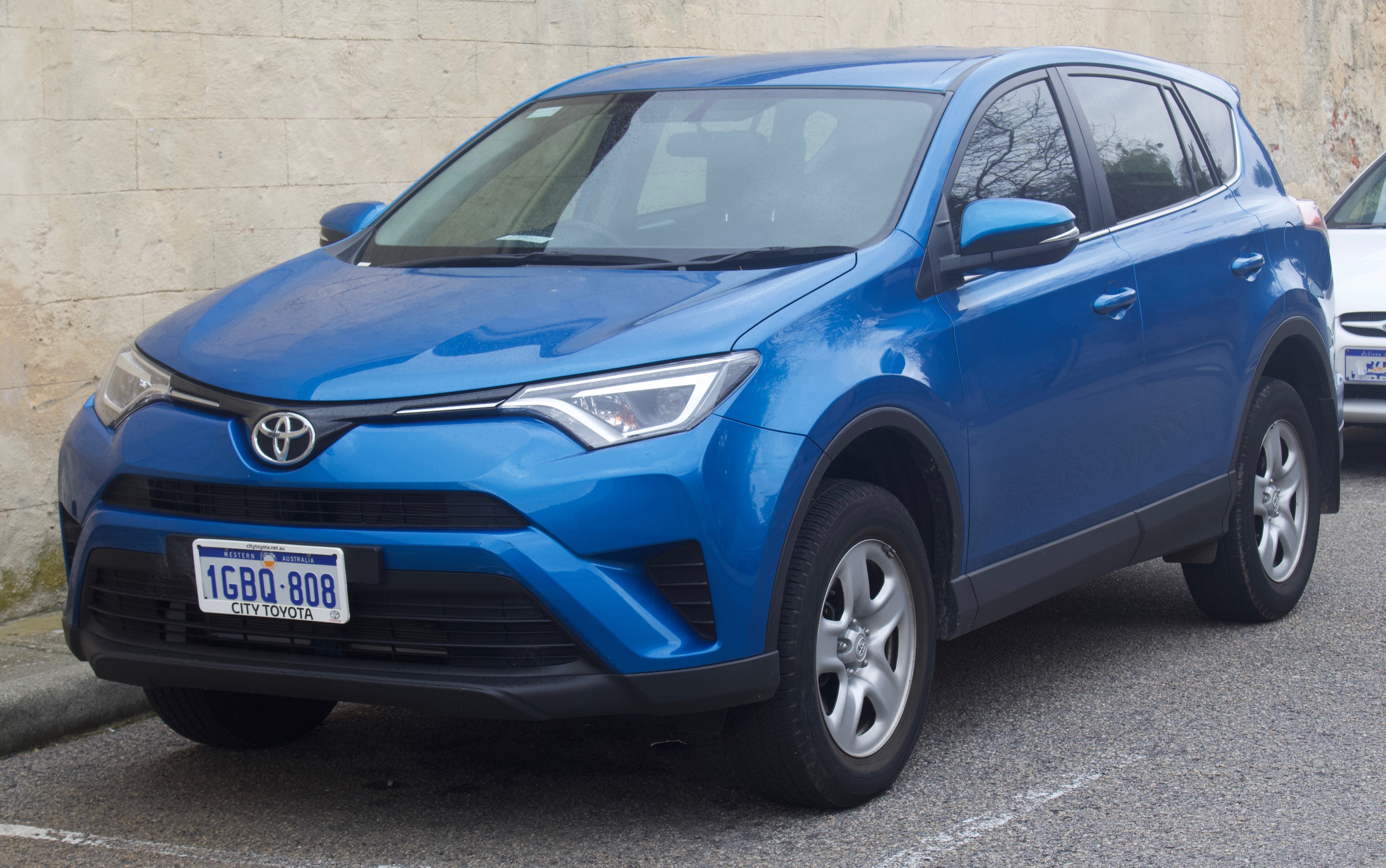
Toyota RAV4, Australia's third best selling vehicle in 2020

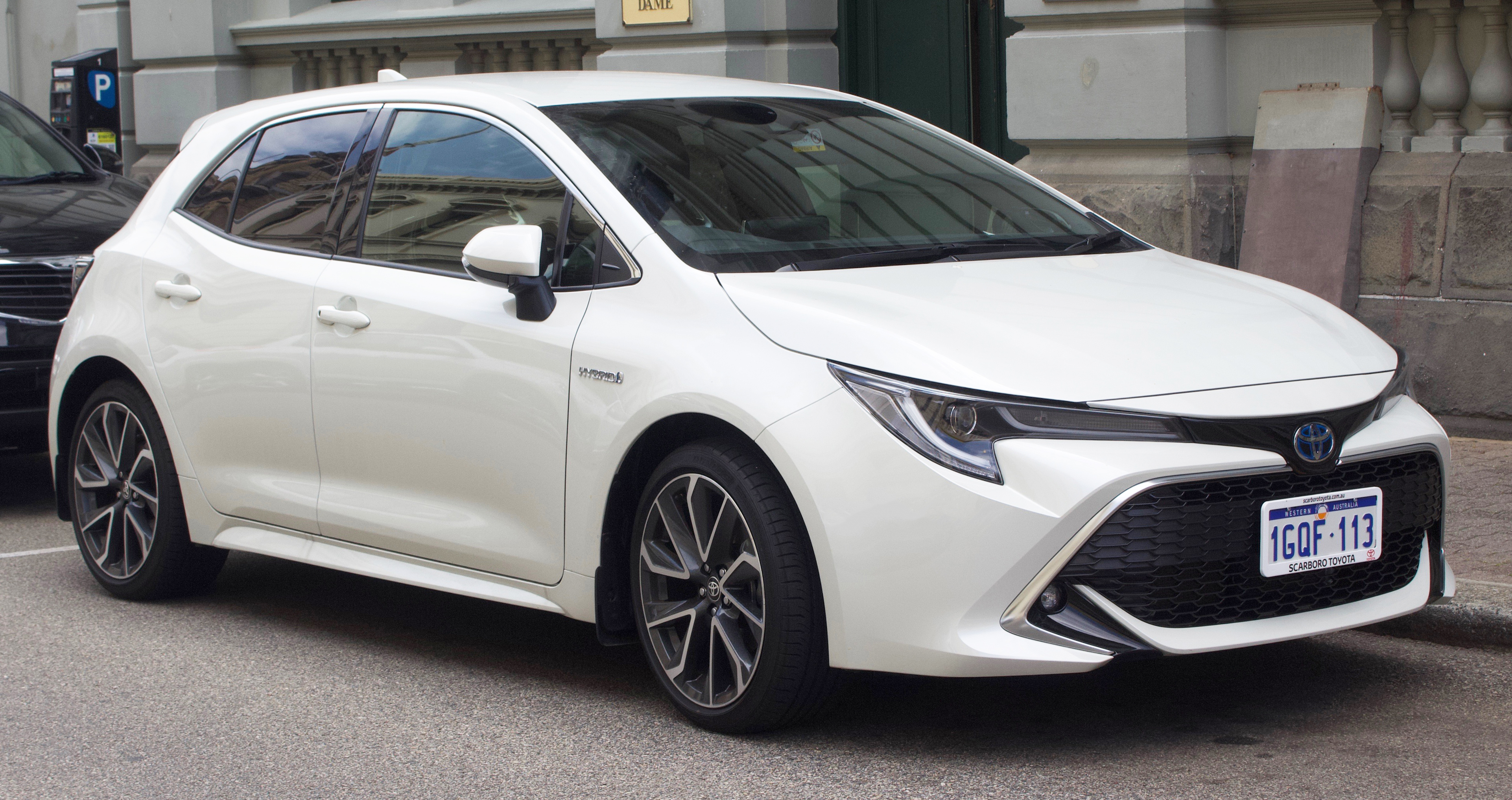
Toyota Corolla, Australia's fourth best selling vehicle in 2020

Passenger models

- Toyota Yaris (subcompact car)
- Toyota Corolla (compact car)
- Toyota Camry (mid-size car)
- Toyota GR86 (sports car)
- Toyota GR Corolla (sports car)
- Toyota GR Yaris (sports car)

SUV models

- Toyota Yaris Cross (mini SUV/Subcompact crossover SUV)
- Toyota C-HR (Subcompact crossover SUV)
- Toyota Corolla Cross (compact crossover SUV)
- Toyota RAV4 (compact crossover SUV)
- Toyota bZ4X (compact crossover SUV)
- Toyota bZ4X Touring (mid-size crossover SUV)
- Toyota Kluger (mid-size crossover SUV)
- Toyota Fortuner (mid-size SUV)
- Toyota Land Cruiser Prado (full-size SUV)
- Toyota Land Cruiser (full-size SUV)

Commercial models

- Toyota Hilux (Mid-size ute)
- Toyota Tundra (full-size ute)
- Toyota Land Cruiser (J70) (ute/troop carrier/full-size SUV)
- Toyota HiAce (van)
- Toyota Granvia (people mover)
- Toyota Coaster (bus)

== Motorsport ==
Toyota Team Australia competed in the Australian Touring Car Championship between 1985 and 1990 with Sprinters, Corollas and a Supra managed by A.M.I Toyota with Team Manager, Tony Niovanni. It also competed in the Australian Rally Championship with Neal Bates.

In March 2015, Toyota Australia announced an affordable, grassroots motorsport series based on the country's best-selling sports car, the Toyota 86 coupe, to be raced at Supercars Championship events. The series started in 2016 and is run as a pro-am with up to five selected professional drivers who will mentor and compete against a larger field of amateur drivers who will qualify to get onto the starting grid. The Toyota 86 Pro-Am race series, under the official banner of Toyota Racing Australia, is staged at selected Supercars events and has been sanctioned by the Confederation of Australian Motor Sport.

== Supporting facilities ==
Toyota Technical Centre Australia (TTC-AU). Formed in June 2003 in Notting Hill, Victoria to do Body Engineering; Chassis, Mechanical Engineering & Evaluation; Customer Quality Engineering; Electronics Engineering; and Support. This facility closed on 30 June 2016 with the loss of 160 jobs.

== Sponsorship ==
Toyota Australia supports a wide range of Australian activities through its community sponsorship and promotions program. These include the Australian Football League, where it has been the premier partner since 2004, AFLW, as well as Cricket Australia, the Australian Paralympic Committee, cycling, triathlon, surfing and snow sports. It is also a key partner of the Tamworth Country Music Festival, in addition to being the major sponsor of Planet Ark's National Tree Day.
