= United Australian Automobile Industries =

Holden and Toyota joint venture

- Type: Joint venture
- Industry: Automotive
- Founded: 11 December 1987
- Founder: Holden, Toyota Australia
- Defunct: March 1996
- Headquarters: Melbourne, Australia
- Products: Motor vehicles

United Australian Automobile Industries (UAAI) was an automobile model sharing firm that operated in Australia between 1987 and 1996 as the result of an agreement between Holden (the Australian subsidiary of General Motors) and Toyota Australia. The joint venture resulted in the two companies sharing production of locally produced automobiles by selling their models under both brands.

UAAI produced three rebadged vehicles: the Holden Apollo (based on the Toyota Camry), Holden Nova (based on the Toyota Corolla) and Toyota Lexcen (based on the Holden Commodore).

== History ==
The formation of UAAI can be traced back to the May 1984 announcement of the Button car plan, the work of Senator John Button, the Minister for Industry under the Hawke Government. The plan envisaged to rationalise and make the Australian automotive industry more competitive on a global scale by means of reducing import tariffs. Under an obligation to amalgamate, Holden and Toyota formed the UAAI joint venture on 11 December 1987 that resulted in model sharing between both automakers. These cars were released to the market in August 1989. As consistent with the government mandated plan, UAAI operated under the framework of coordinated design, engineering and product sharing whilst maintaining independent marketing operations and dealership networks. For Holden, it replaced the earlier joint venture with Nissan that had resulted in model sharing from 1984.

Toyota commenced manufacture of the Nova for Holden in June 1989 and the Apollo in July. Both companies held back certain marketing advantages to produce a greater level of model differentiation, for example the Toyotas were positioned as slightly more upmarket and equipment levels differed. Irrespective of this, many buyers could tell that the cars were merely rebadged versions of other cars available on the market, and sales figures generated by the disguised versions reinforced this. That is, the version of the car produced by the original manufacturer far surpassed the sales figures for the rebadged version.

Poor sales of the rebadged cars and an unwillingness to embrace the forced relationship led to dissolution of UAAI. This occurred in March 1996. Production ended later in the year, although a large enough stockpile remained for some vehicles to remain in showrooms until 1997.

== Products ==
=== Holden Apollo ===
Introduced in 1989, the Holden Apollo was basically a badge-engineered Toyota Camry sedan and station wagon. The second generation model was introduced in 1993 and remained in production until 1996.

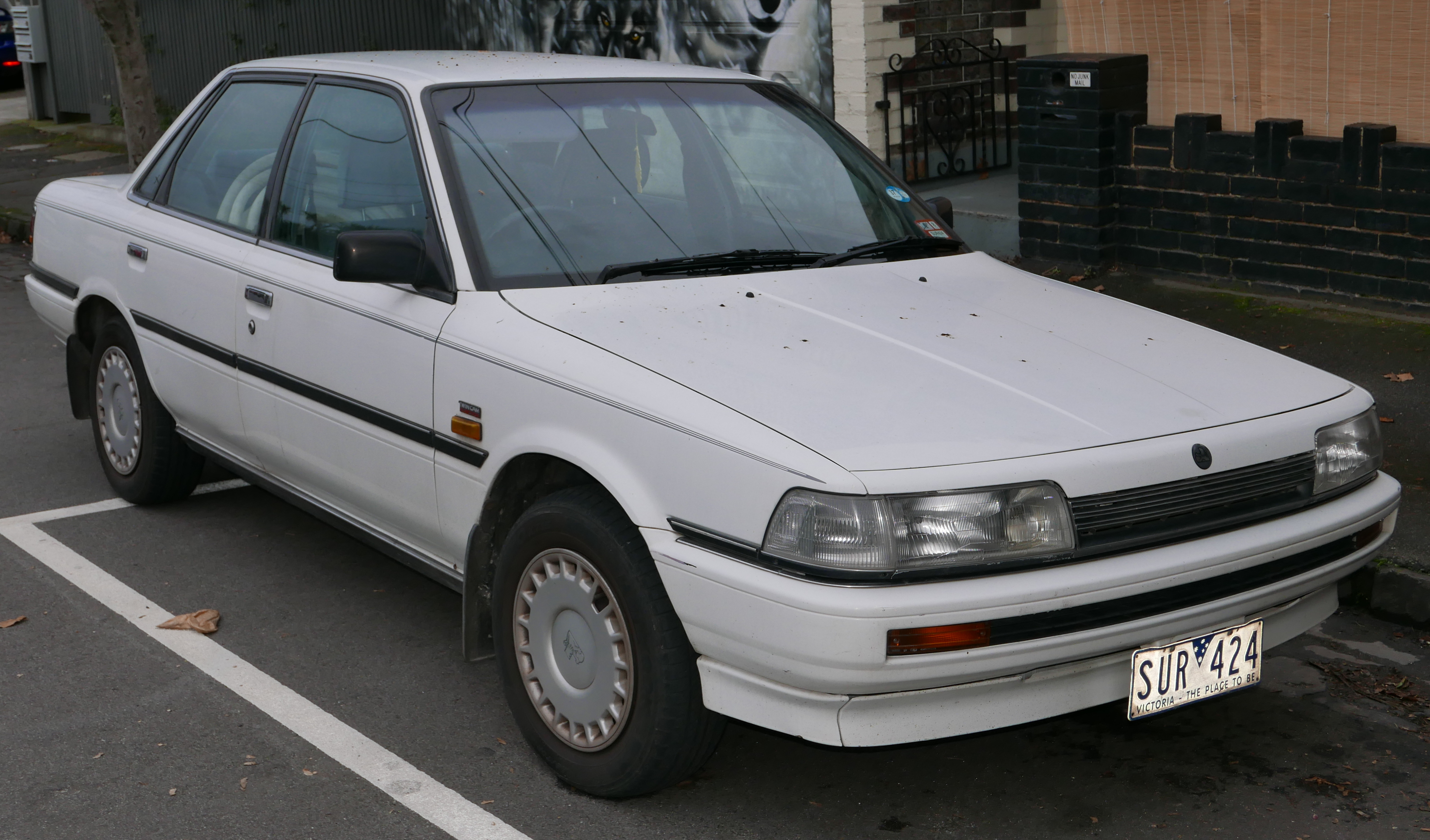
1989–1991 Holden Apollo (JK) sedan, based on the Toyota Camry (V20)

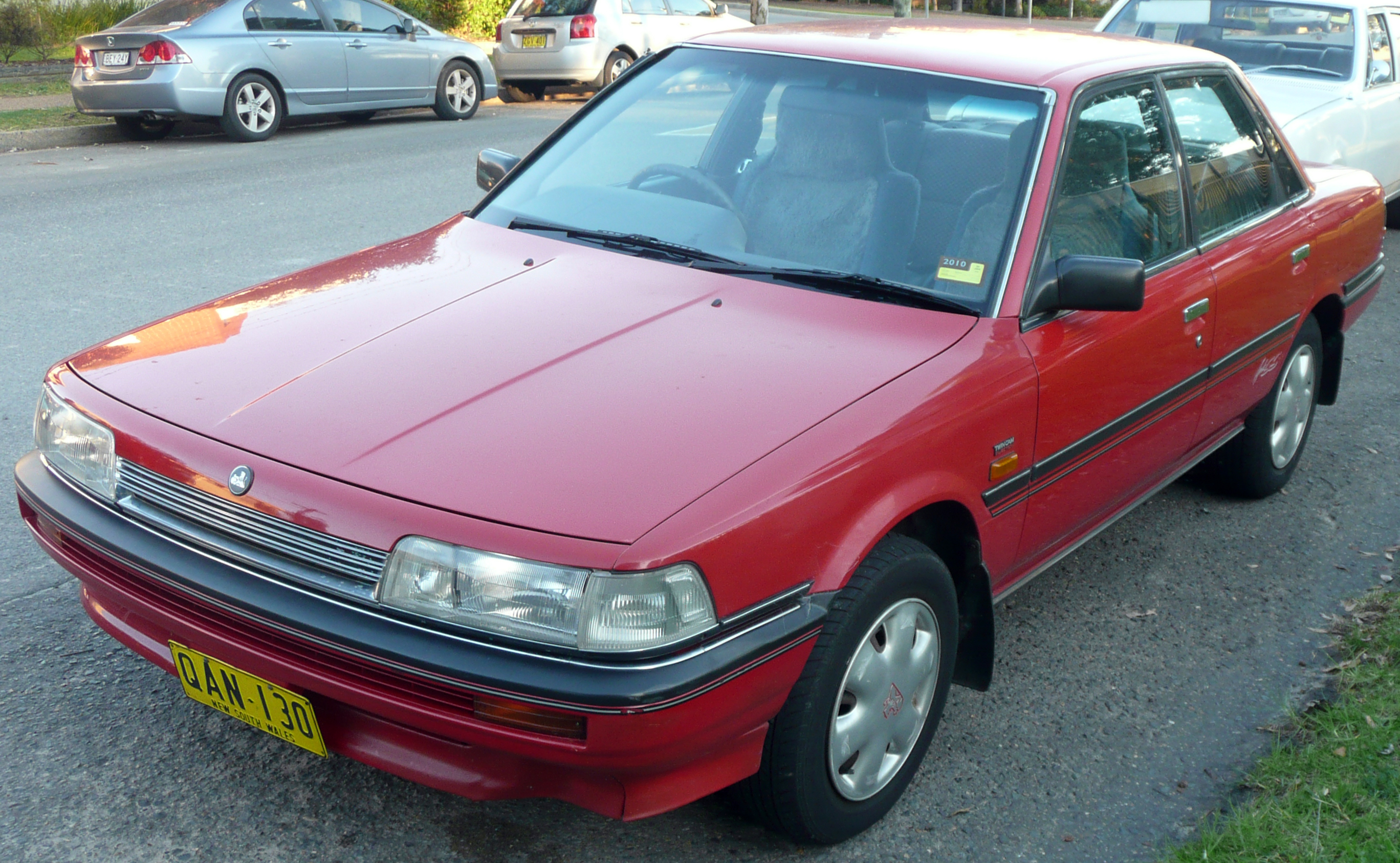
1991–1992 Holden Apollo (JL) sedan, based on the Toyota Camry (V20)

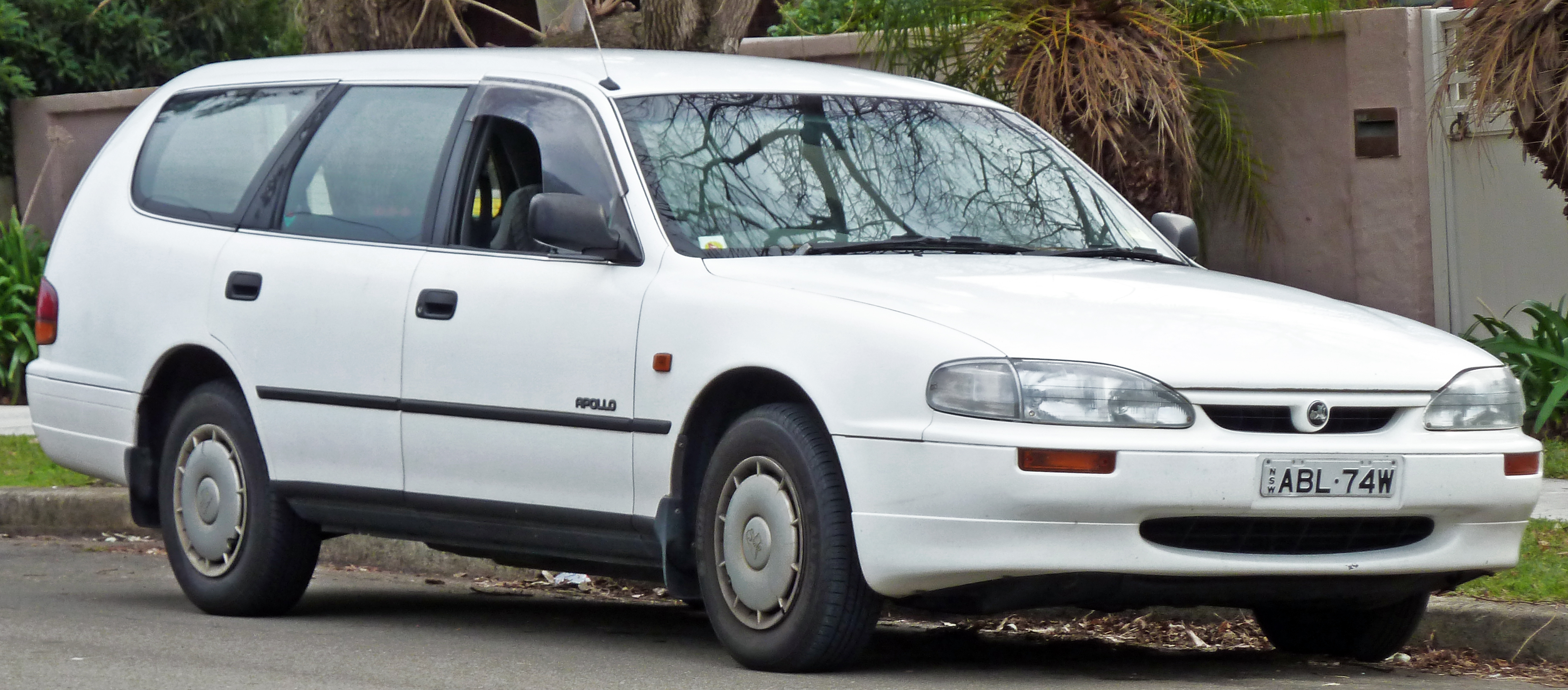
1993–1995 Holden Apollo (JM) wagon, based on the Toyota Camry (XV10)

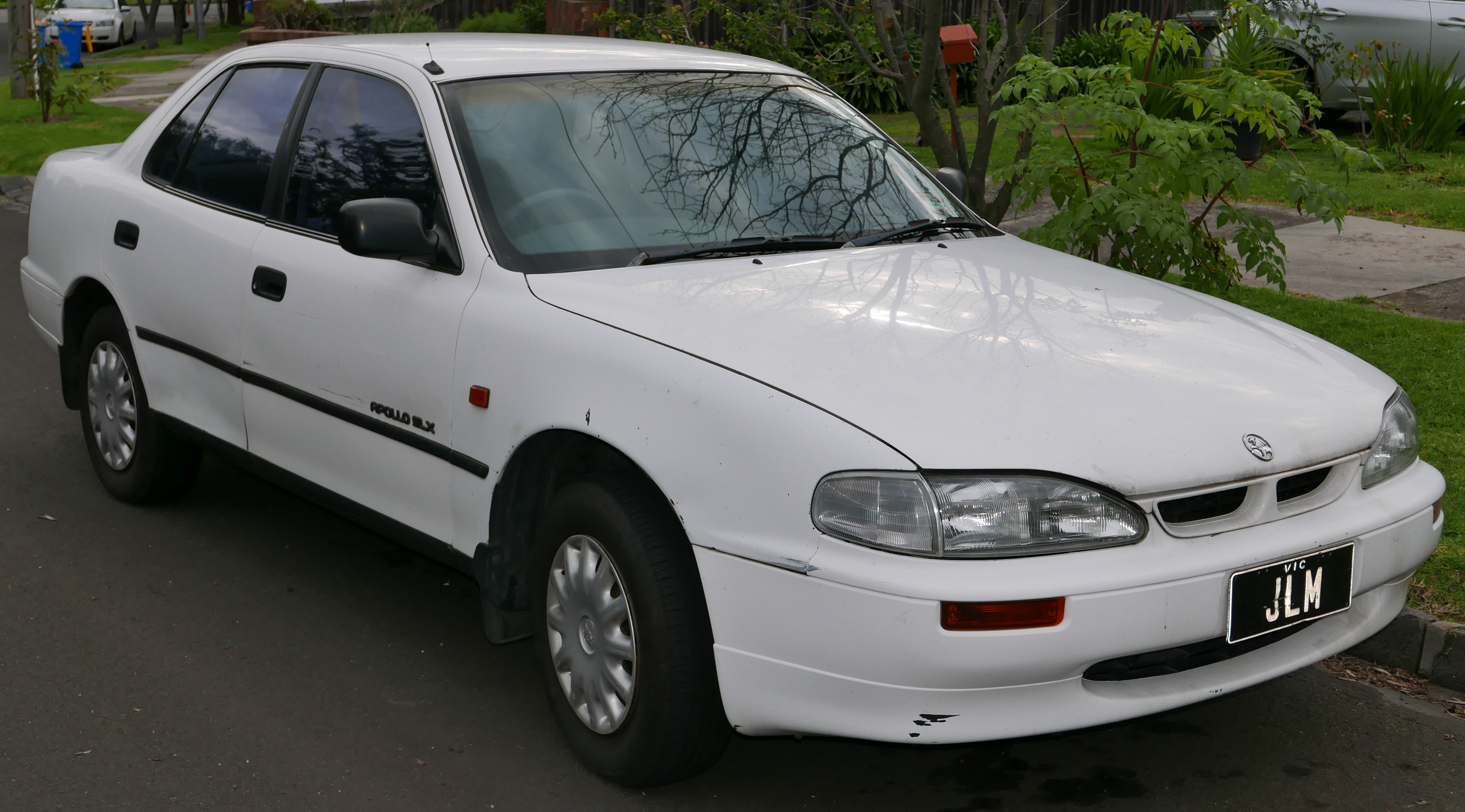
1995–1996 Holden Apollo (JP) sedan, based on the Toyota Camry (XV10)

=== Holden Nova ===
The Holden Nova sedan and hatchback, like the Apollo arrived in dealerships in 1989 replacing the Holden Astra (LD), a joint development with Nissan also producing the Nissan Pulsar (N13). The Nova was a rebadged Toyota Corolla (E90) with the front panels, grille and headlamps from the Japanese-specification Corolla FX hatchback. This was a similar approach to the then contemporary Geo/Chevrolet Prizm sold in the United States and Mexico, which utilised E90 Sprinter panels to differentiate between GM and Toyota models. While the Nova was a Toyota design, the factory producing it at the Holden Dandenong Plant, which was a Holden factory closed in 1988 in preparation of production of the Corolla/Nova.

In 1994, Holden released the second generation Nova based on the Toyota Corolla (E100), now manufactured at the Toyota Australia Altona Plant. Production ended in 1996, with the Nova being replaced by the TR Astra, a rebadged version of the Opel Astra F built by Vauxhall Motors in the UK.

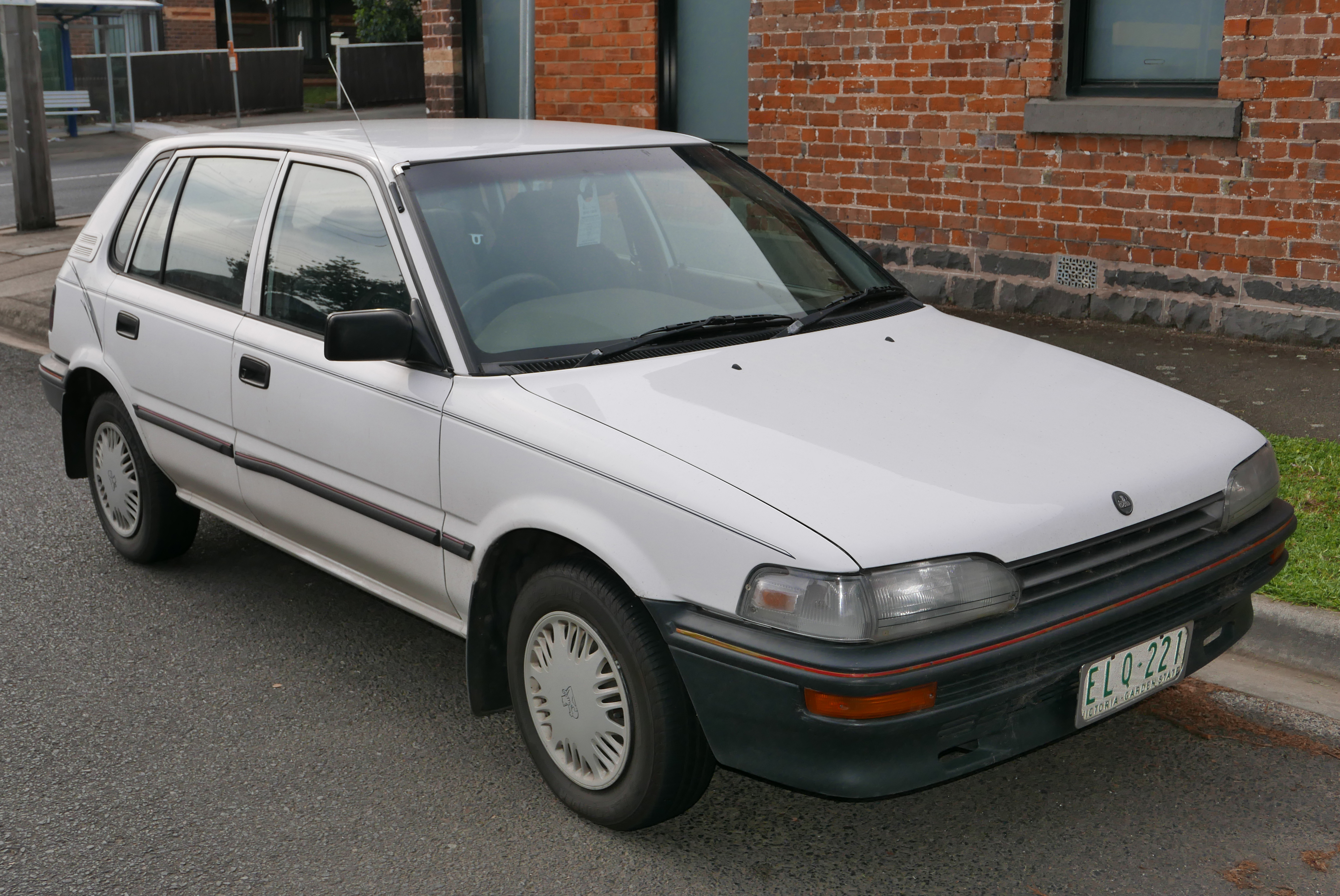
1989–1991 Holden Nova (LE) hatchback, based on the Toyota Corolla (E90).

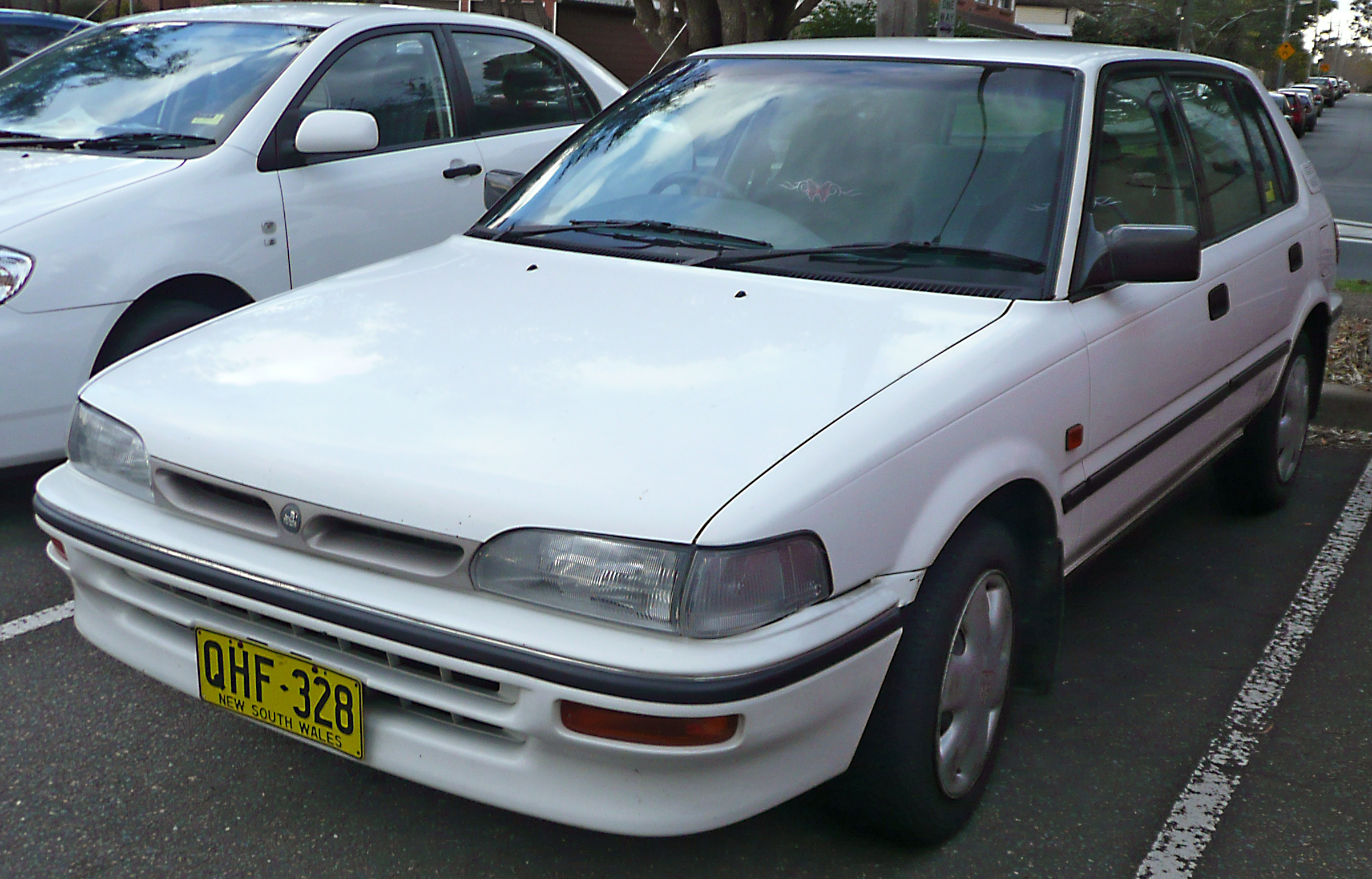
1991–1994 Holden Nova (LF) hatchback, based on the Toyota Corolla (E90).

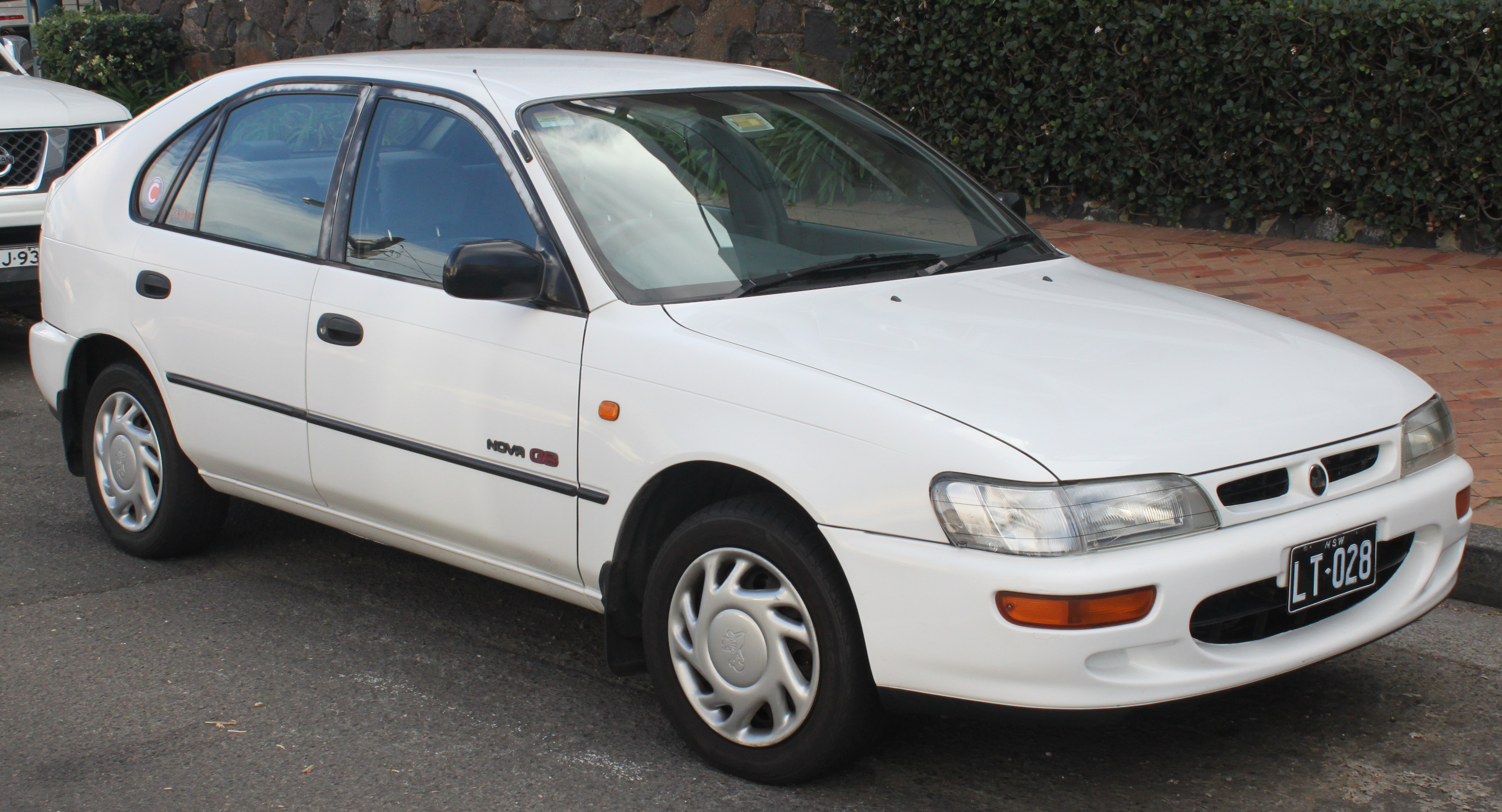
1994–1996 Holden Nova (LG) hatchback, based on the Toyota Corolla (E100).

=== Toyota Lexcen ===
The Toyota Lexcen reached Toyota dealerships in 1989, the same year that Toyota models arrived in Holden showrooms. The Lexcen was Toyota's version of the Holden Commodore, available in the same sedan and station wagon body styles, but only in the V6 engine and automatic transmission guise. The Holden however, was available with a V8 engine option, and had the availability of manual transmission for both the V6 and V8. Holden stopped supplying Toyota with the Lexcen in 1997.

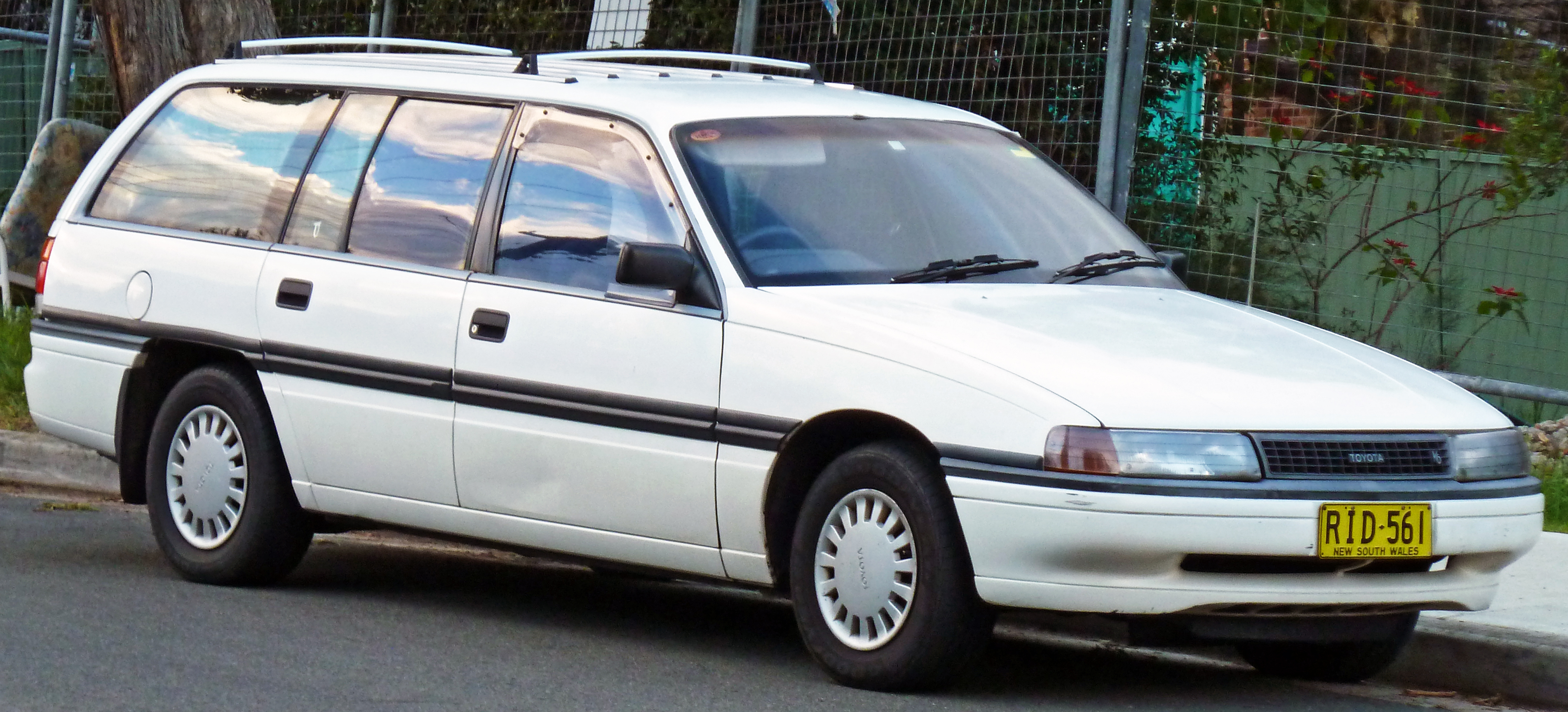
1989–1991 Toyota Lexcen (T1), based on the Holden Commodore (VN).

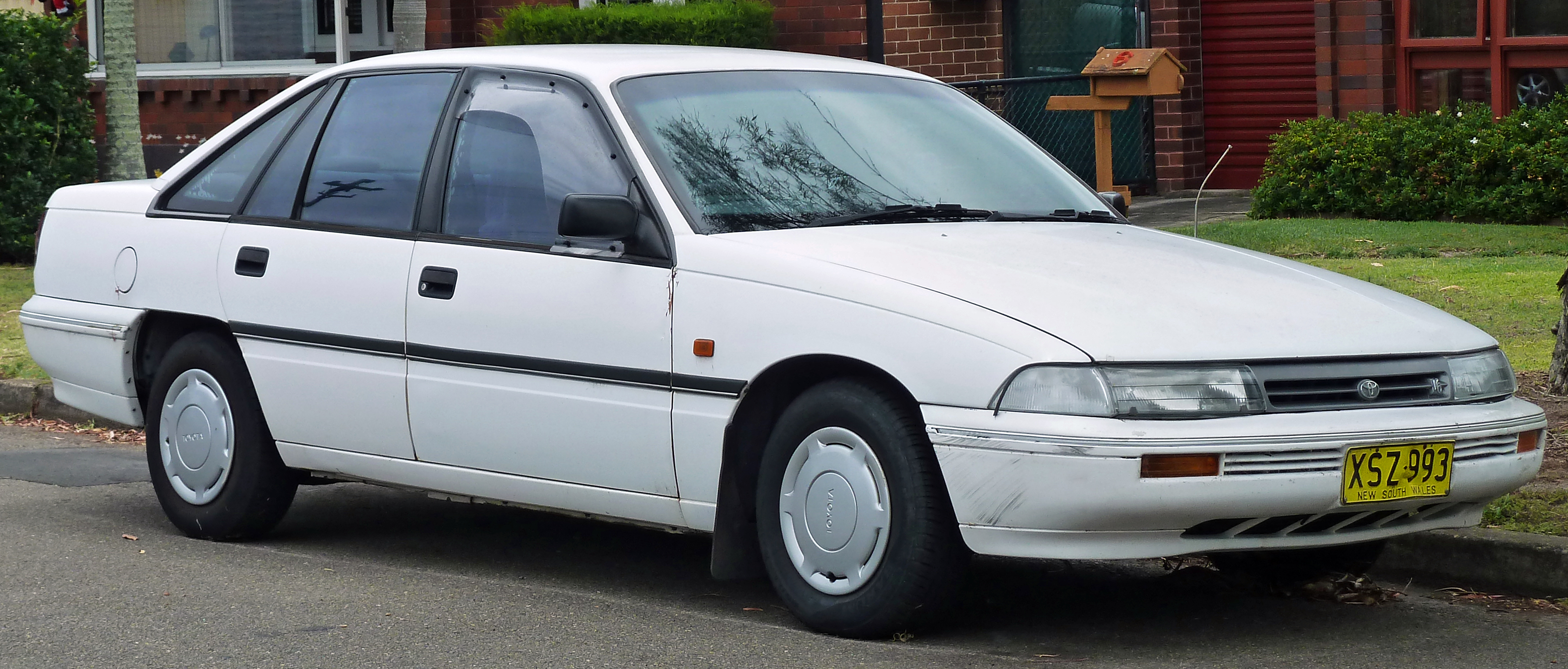
1991–1993 Toyota Lexcen (T2), based on the Holden Commodore (VP).

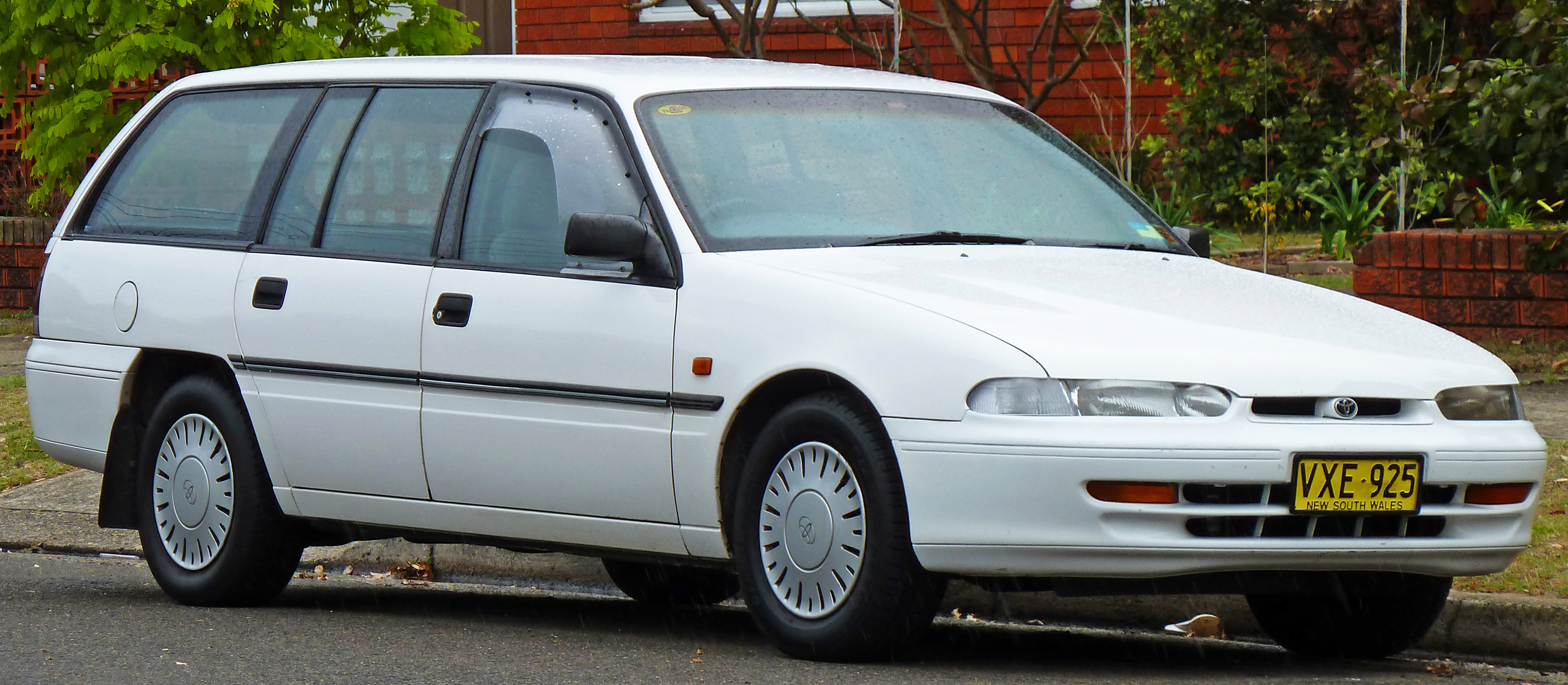
1993–1995 Toyota Lexcen (T3), based on the Holden Commodore (VR).

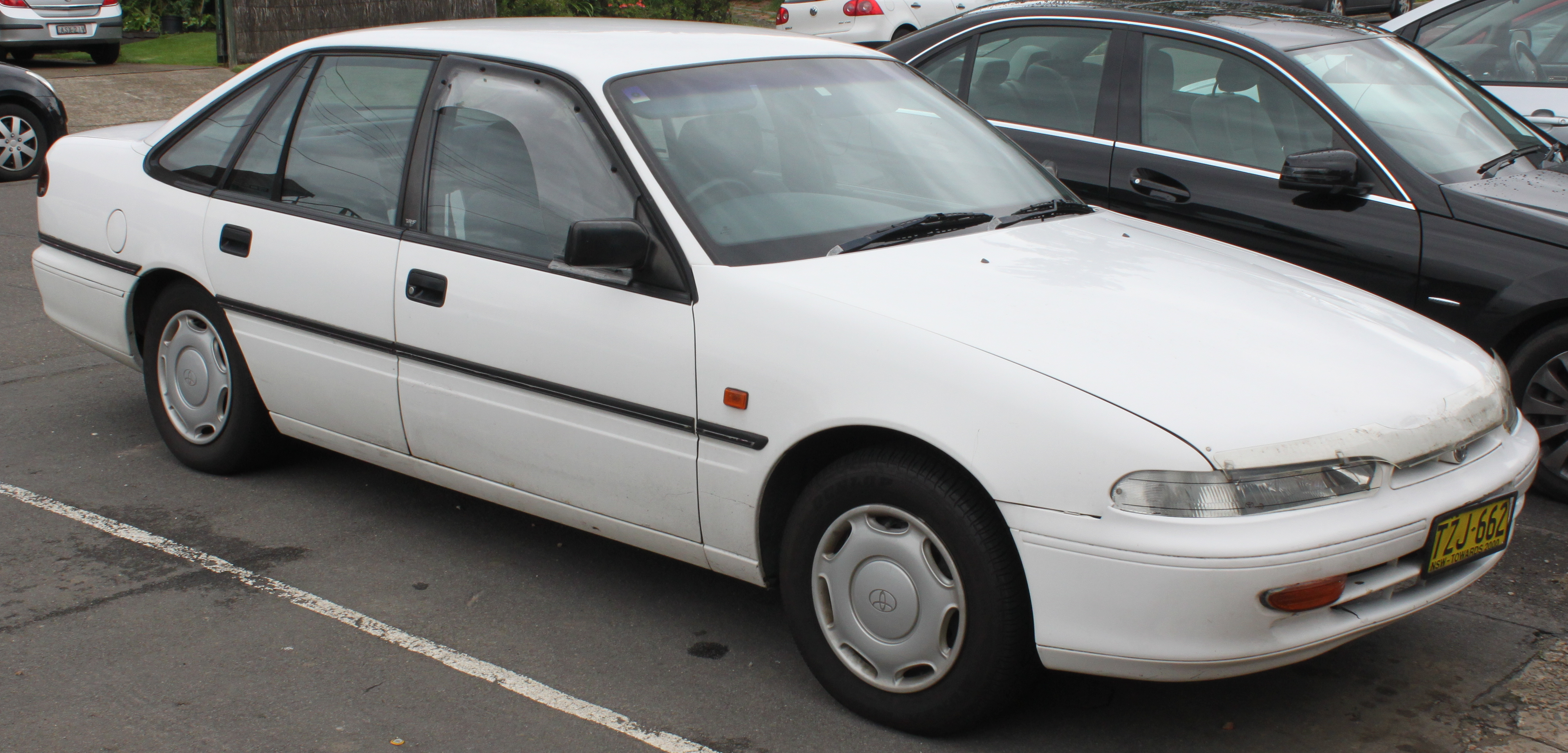
1995–1996 Toyota Lexcen (T4), based on the Holden Commodore (VS).

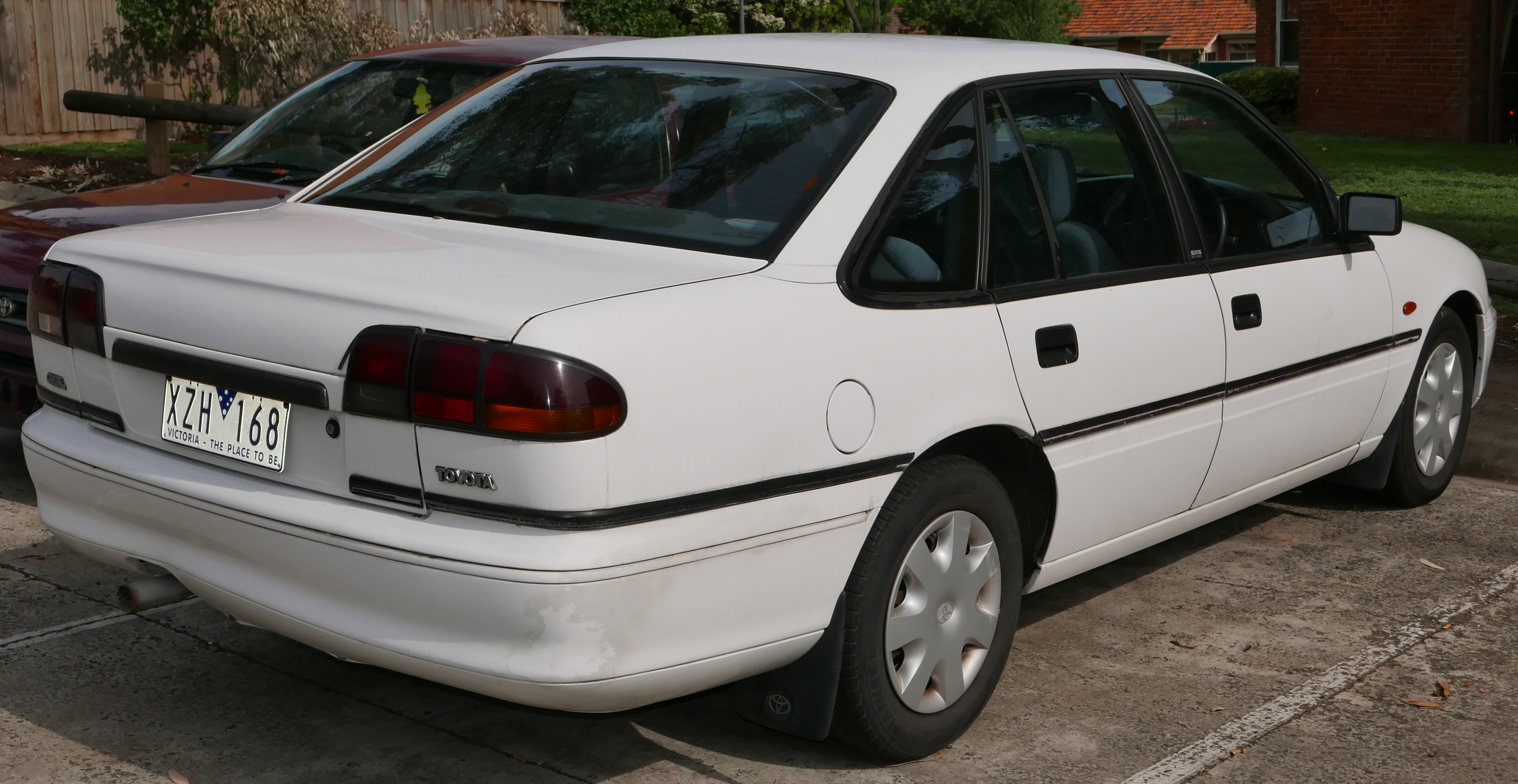
1996–1997 Toyota Lexcen (T5) based on the Holden Commodore (VS II).

== Sales ==
By the end of 1993, the UAAI venture cars realised sales of 21 percent at best when compared to the models retailed by their original manufacturers.

Nova production in 1992 totalled 3,697 units (16.6 percent of the Toyota Corolla figure); 3,016 Novas were manufactured in 1993 (12.6 percent), and in 1994 production amounted to 3,581 units (16.5 percent). Apollo production in 1992 totalled 4,490 units (17.5 percent of the Toyota Camry figure, excluding exports); 5,314 Apollos were manufactured in 1993 (18.2 percent), and in 1994 production amounted to 5,519 units (14.7 percent).

== See also ==
- CAMI Automotive (CAMI) – a similar joint venture in Canada between Suzuki and General Motors that operated from 1986 to 2009.
- New United Motor Manufacturing, Inc. (NUMMI) – a similar joint venture in the United States between Toyota and General Motors that operated from 1984 to 2010.
