= Holden Nova =

Compact car from Holden

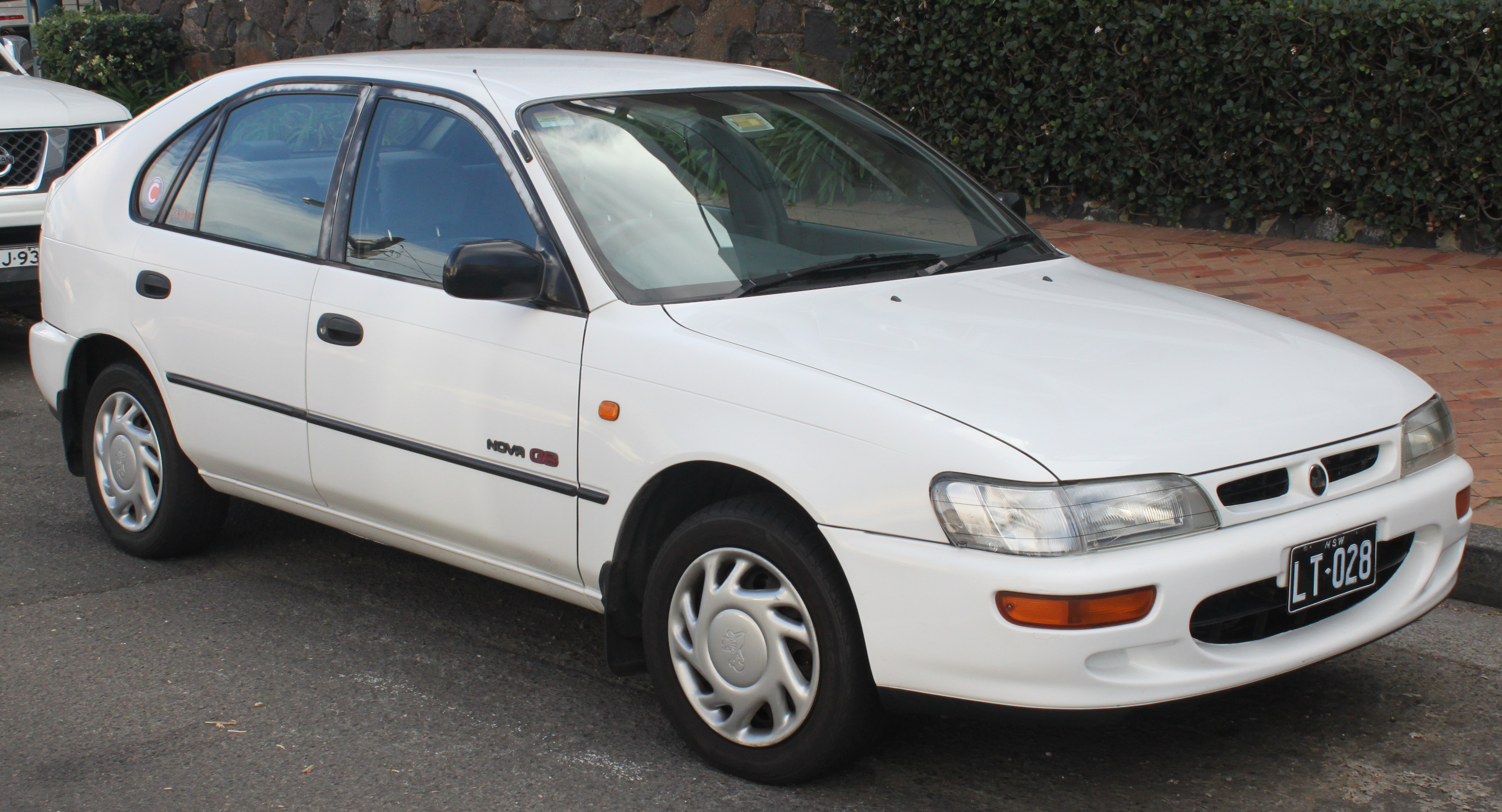

Overview
- Manufacturer: Holden
- Production: June 1989–1996
- Assembly: Australia: Dandenong, Victoria (1989–1994); Altona, Victoria (1994–1996)
- Designer: John Field (LG)

Body and chassis
- Class: Compact car
- Body style: 4-door sedan; 5-door hatchback
- Layout: FF layout
- Related: Toyota Sprinter; Toyota Corolla; Toyota Tazz; Geo Prizm

Powertrain
- Engine: Petrol: 1.4 L 6A-FC I4; 1.6 L 4A-FE I4; 1.8 L 7A-FE I4
- Transmission: 5-speed manual; 4-speed automatic

Chronology
- Predecessor: Holden Astra (LD)
- Successor: Holden Astra (TR)

The Holden Nova is a compact car which was manufactured by Toyota Australia as a badge engineered Toyota Corolla between August 1989 and 1996. It was a result of the Button car plan which attempted to rationalise the Australian car manufacturing industry. The Nova was sold and marketed under the Holden nameplate, and although referred to as the GM S platform, was nearly identical to the Corolla. However it received minor stylistic changes. The Nova was sold as a four-door sedan and five-door hatchback.

Initially assembled at the former Holden Dandenong Plant, in 1994 production was transferred to Altona.

In all years, the Nova was outsold by the Toyota Corolla in Australia, and the car was replaced by the Holden Astra in 1996.

== First generation (LE, LF; 1989–1994) ==
The LE and LF series, based on the Corolla E90 were sold between August 1989 and September 1994. The LE was offered with Toyota's 1.4-litre 60-kilowatt (80 hp) engine (hatchback only) and 1.6-litre 67-kilowatt (90 hp) engine, in Holden's traditional SL (hatchback only), SLX and SLE trims. The LF Nova, available from October 1991, added fuel injection to the 1.6-litre unit, now rated at 75 kilowatts (101 hp). The SLE hatchback was replaced by a GS model, although SLE continued as a trim on the sedan, then in October 1992, a fuel-injected 1.8-litre 85-kilowatt (114 hp) engine was offered for the GS hatchback. The 1.4-litre option and the SLEs were unavailable from 1993.

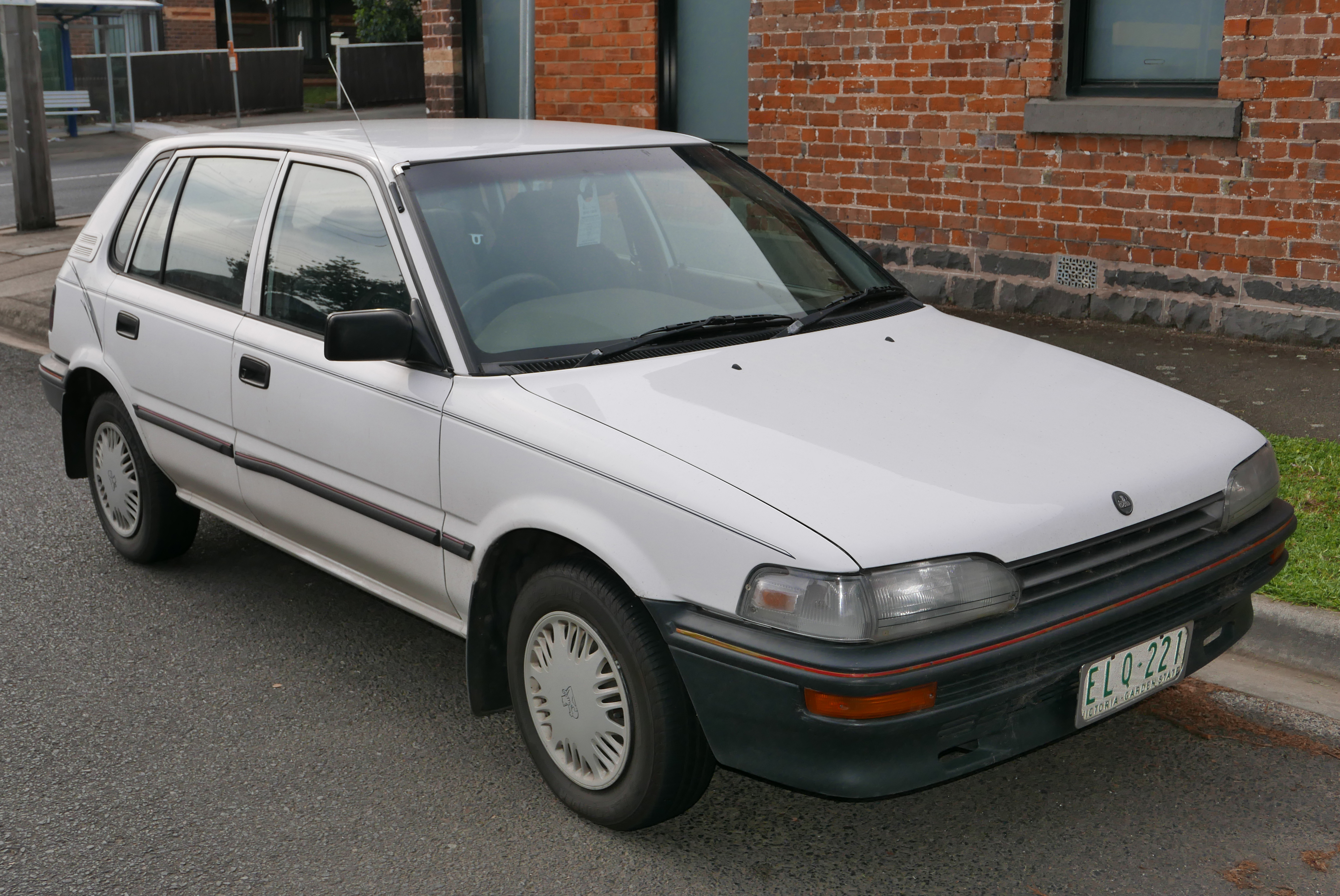
LE Nova SLX hatchback

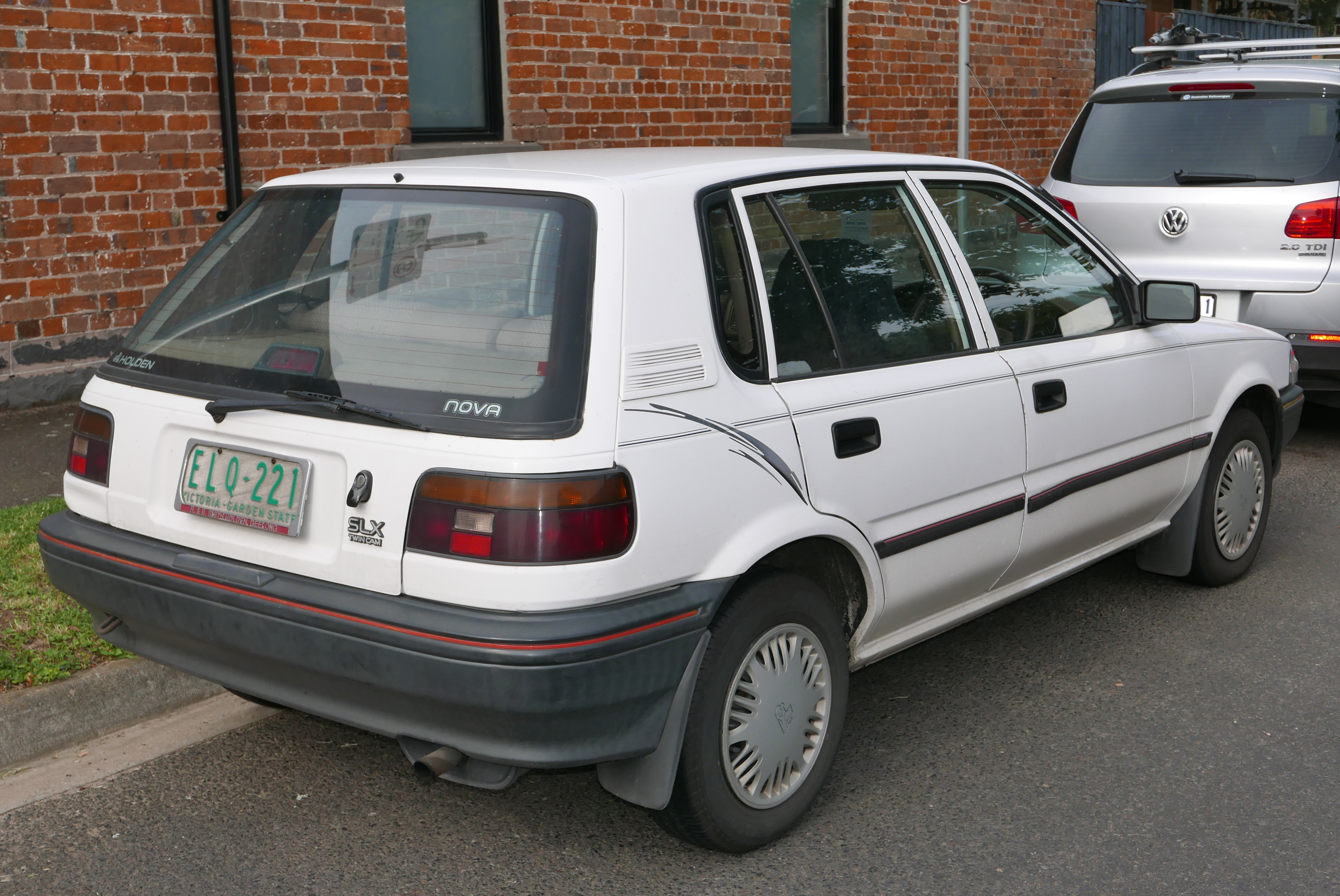
LE Nova SLX hatchback

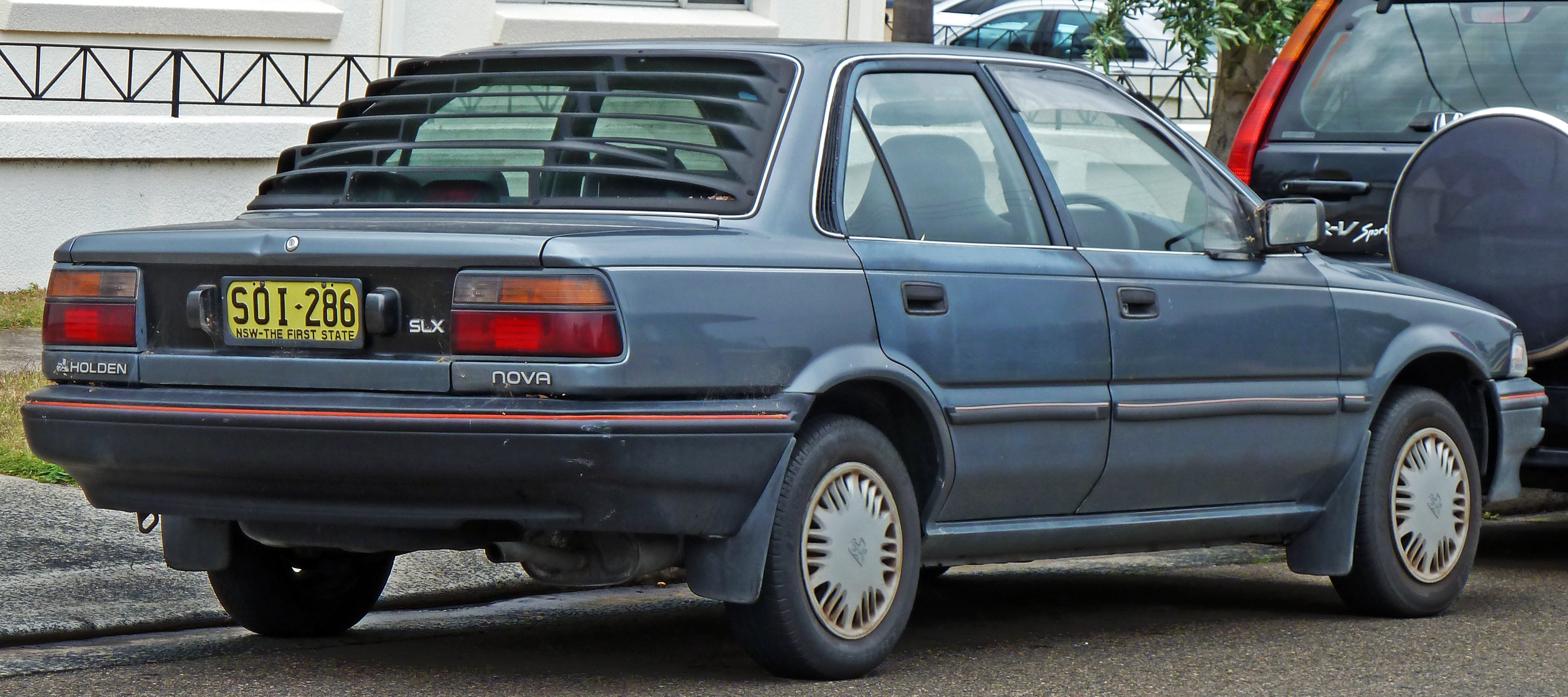
LE Nova SLX sedan
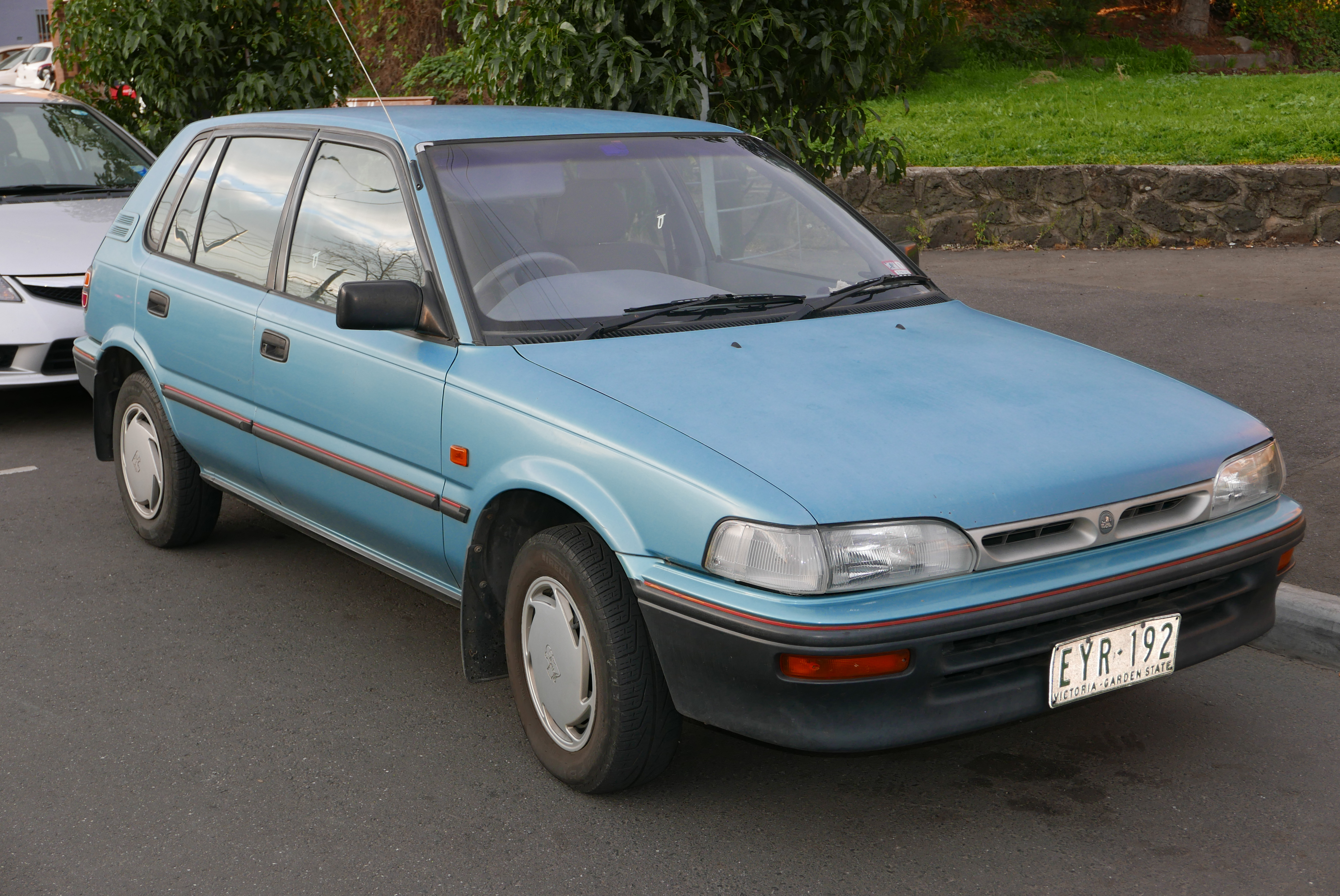
LF Nova SLX hatchback

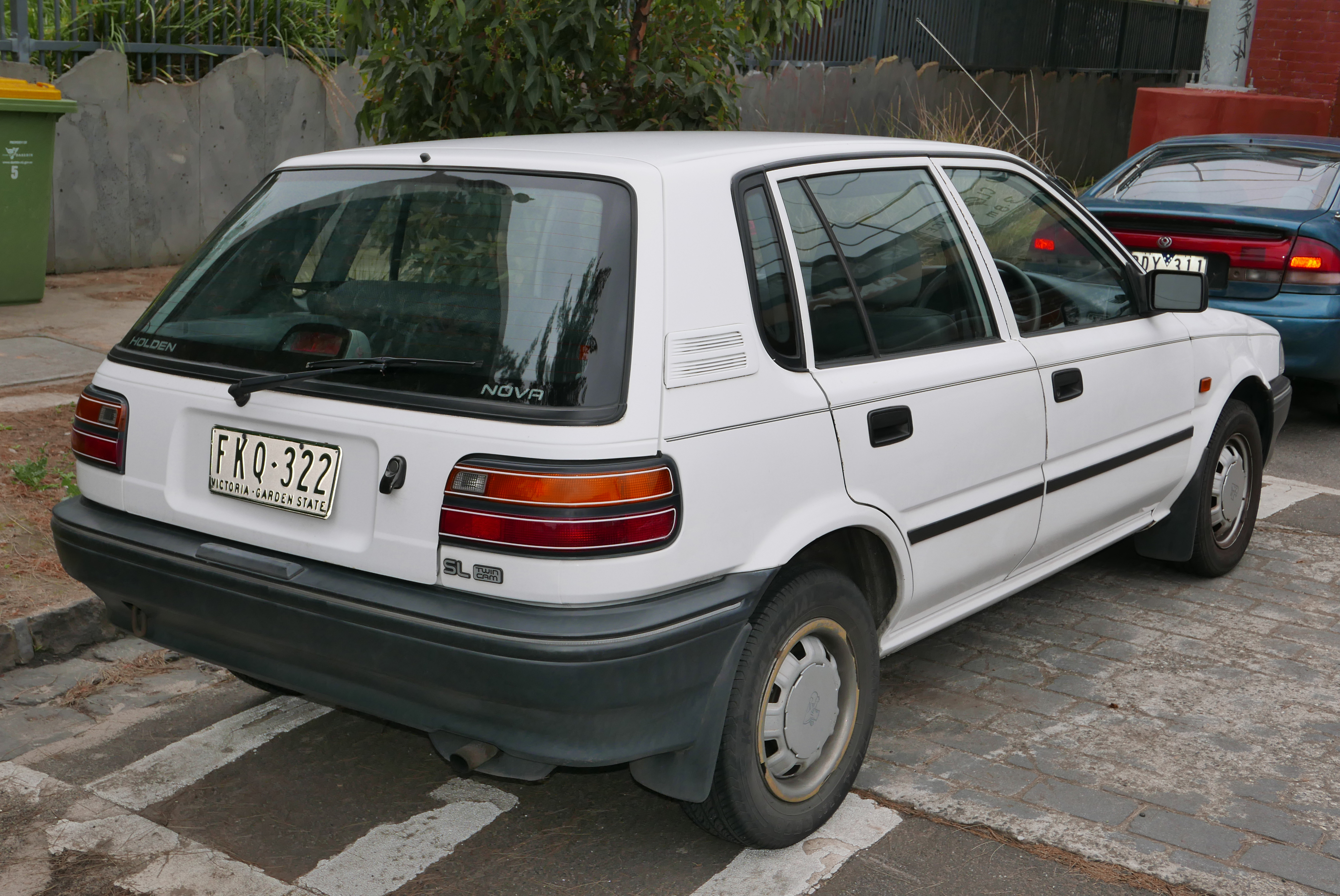
LF Nova SL hatchback

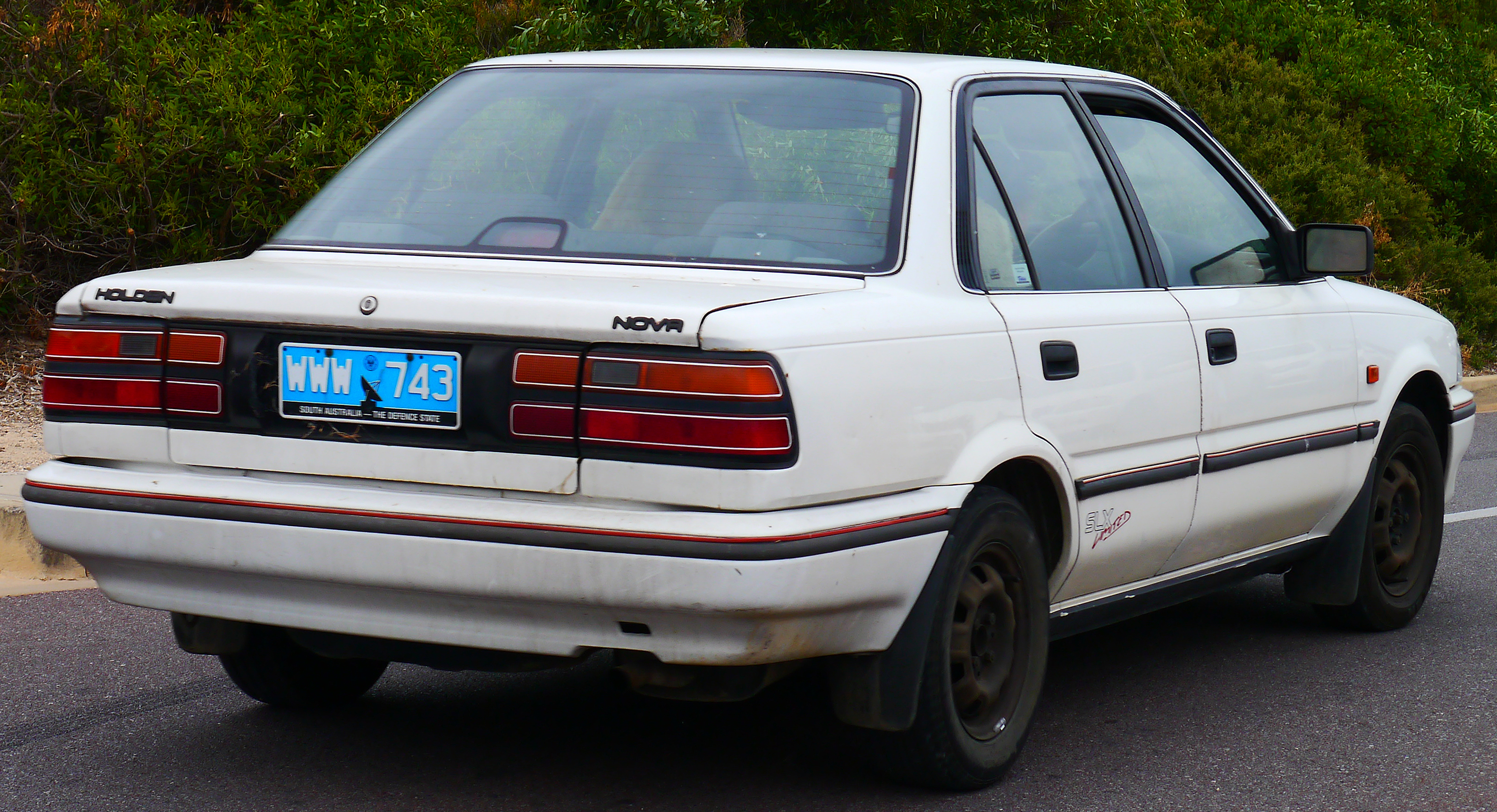
LF Nova SLX Limited sedan

== Second generation (LG; 1994–1996) ==
The LG Nova was sold between 1994 and 1996, although a smaller range was offered. The SLX trim level was equipped with a 1.6-litre 78-kilowatt (105 hp) engine, while the GS trim level denoted the fitment of the 1.8-litre engine. Four-door sedan and five-door hatchback options were offered for both levels, and all engines featured fuel injection.

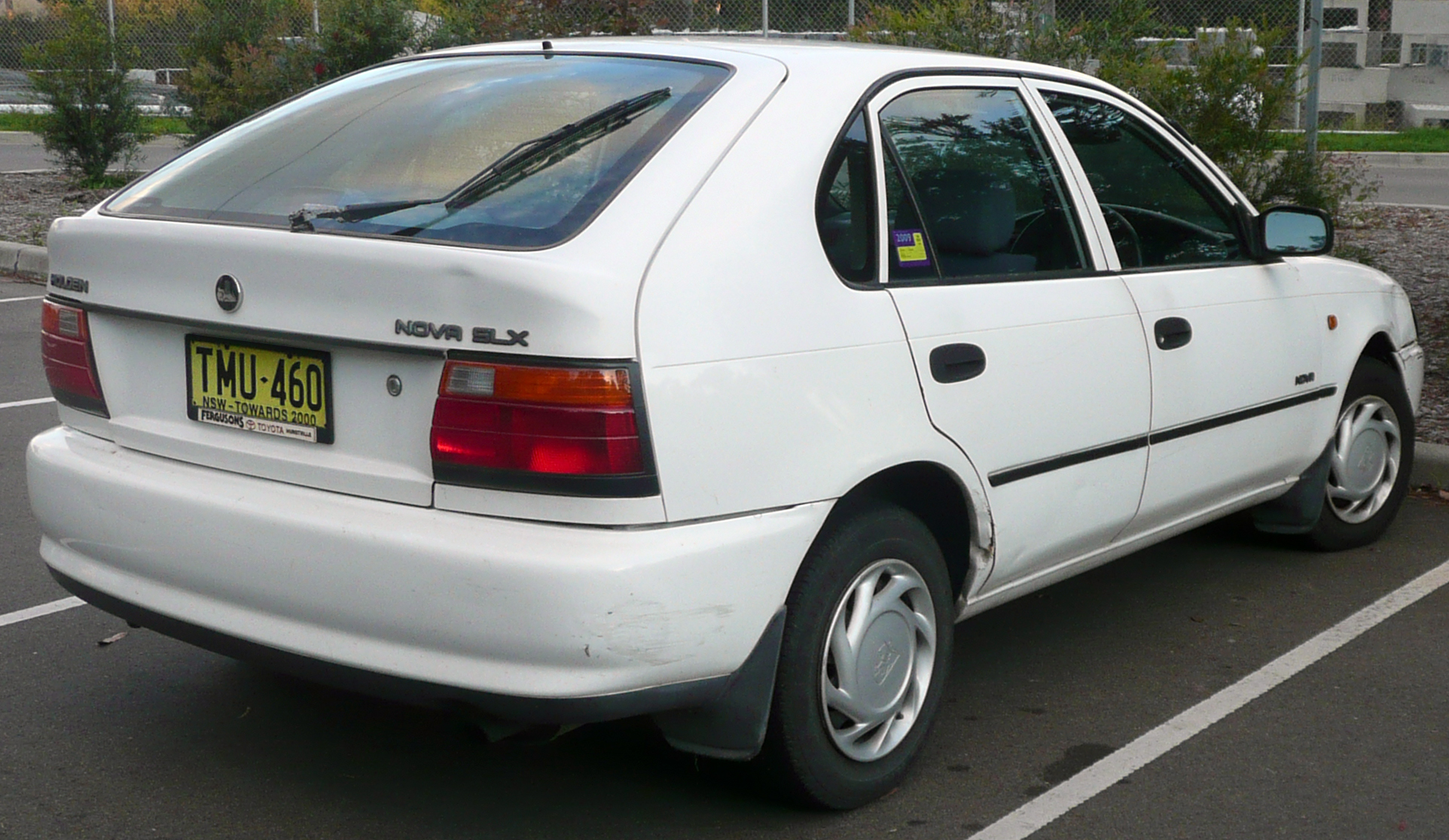
LG Nova SLX hatchback

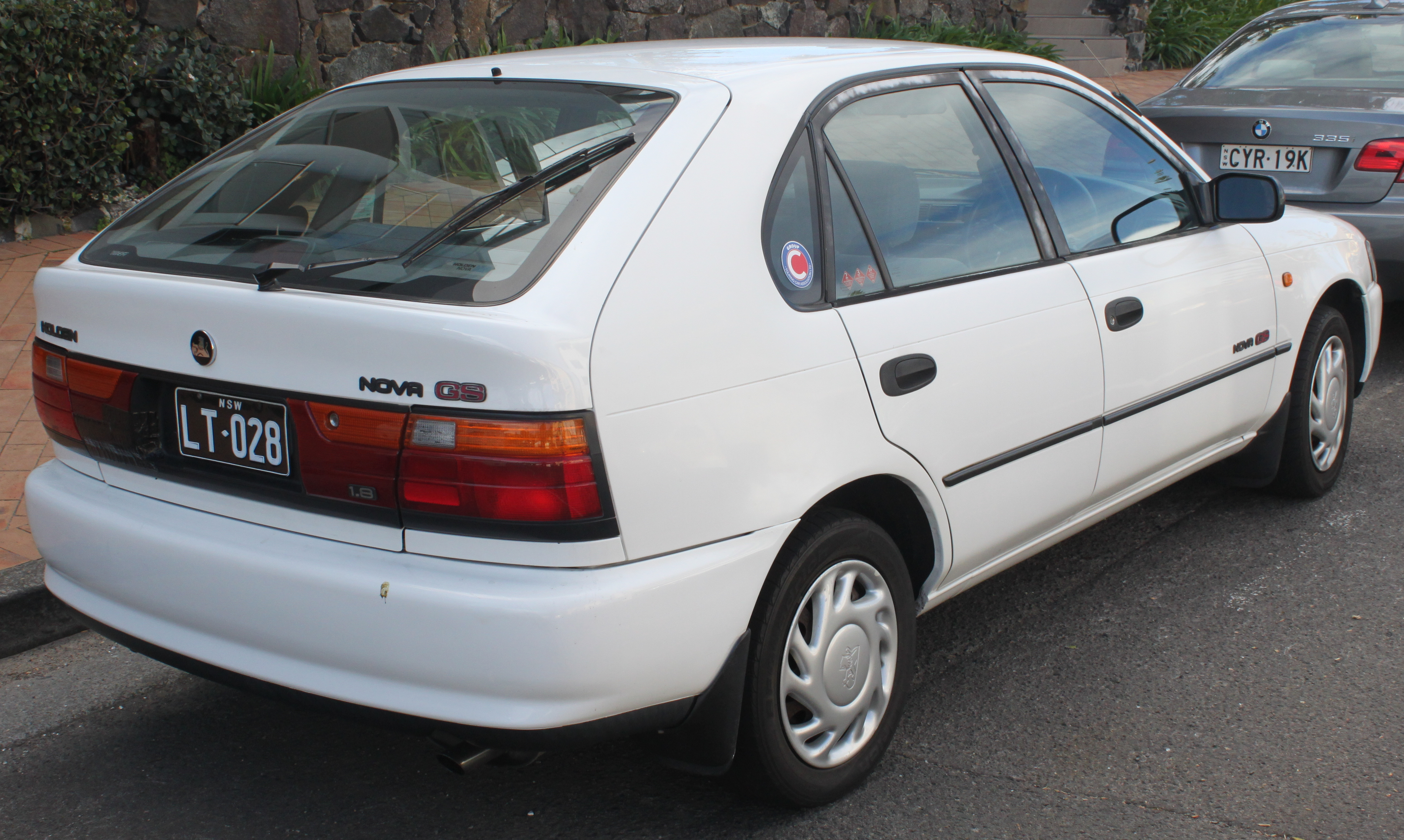
LG Nova GS hatchback

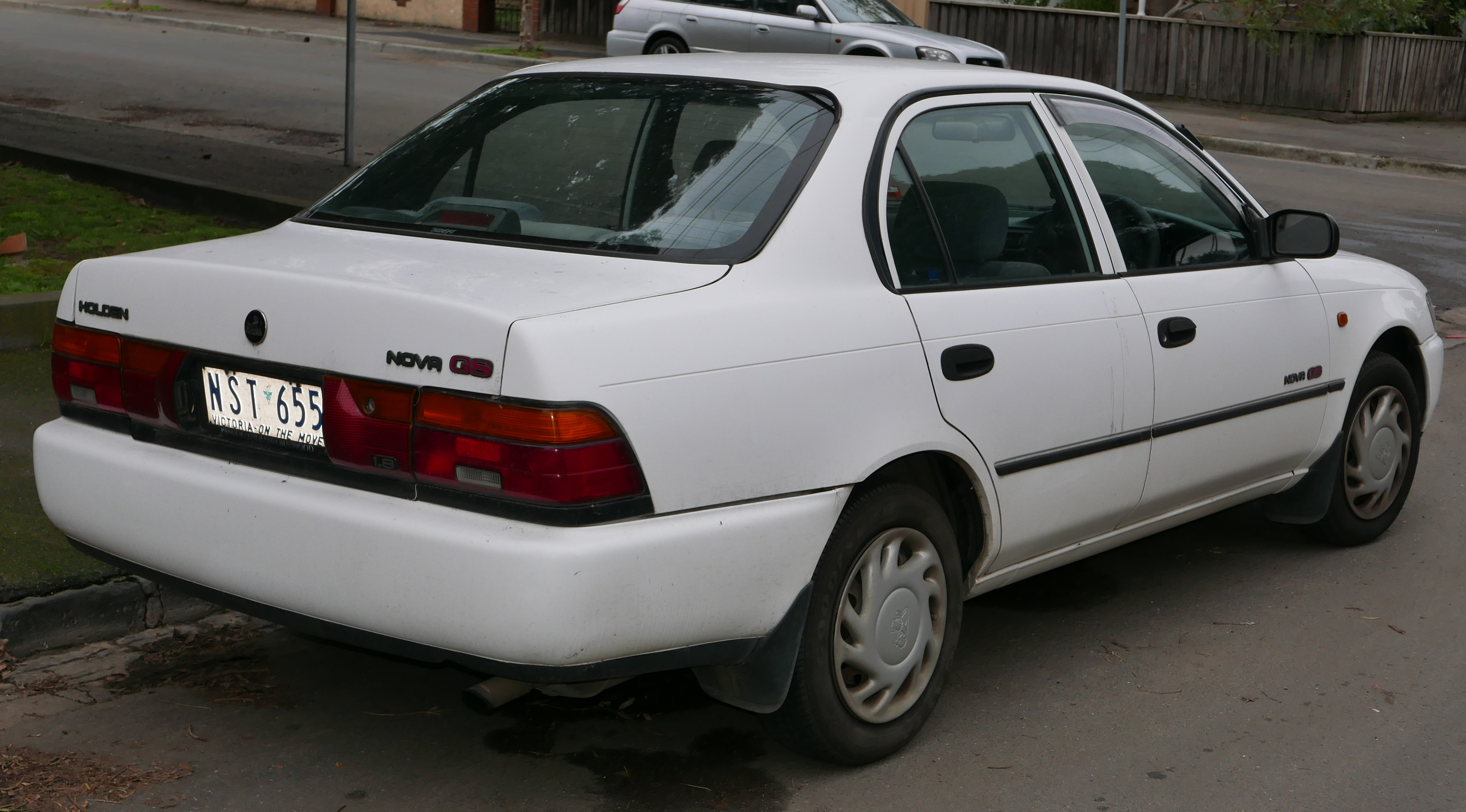
LG Nova GS sedan
