= Button car plan =

1980s Australian government initiative in the motor industry

Original vehicle	Badge-engineered derivative
Ford Falcon	Nissan Ute
Holden Commodore	Toyota Lexcen
Nissan Pintara	Ford Corsair
Nissan Pulsar	Holden Astra
Toyota Camry	Holden Apollo
Toyota Corolla	Holden Nova
Nissan Patrol	Ford Maverick

The Button car plan, also known as the Button plan, was the informal name given to the Motor Industry Development Plan, a Hawke government initiative intended to rationalise the Australian motor vehicle industry and transition it to lower levels of protection. It took its name from Senator John Button, the then federal Minister for Commerce, Trade and Industry.

== Initial planning ==
Industry consultation began in mid-1983 and the scheme was announced in mid-1984. It came into effect in 1985, after Senator Button visited Japan to inform the car companies there of the content of the plan. At the time of the plan's inception, Australia's motor industry was heavily protected by import tariffs, and quotas or quantitative restrictions on imports. These measures were used to support local assembly of thirteen models by a range of manufacturers.

The Button car plan aimed to slash the number of locally manufactured models to six, by forcing industry consolidation——there were to be three groups each producing two models each by 1992. The overarching aim of the scheme was to make the motor vehicle industry in Australia more efficient through consolidation of resources, and so allowing the import tariffs to be gradually reduced.

== Tariff rates ==
At the beginning of the 1980s, tariff rates on motor vehicles were around 60 per cent. Under the plan, tariff rates were reduced by 2.5 percentage points a year from 1988, falling to 15 per cent by 2000, well below the rates in many comparable countries.

Tariffs were reduced further in 2005 and 2010, and most remaining assistance was removed after 2015, leading to the end of automotive mass production in Australia.

== Badge engineering ==
The most obvious effect of the plan for the Australian car buyer was the appearance of badge-engineered vehicles, where the same basic vehicle was sold by several companies under different names. Other approaches included the Ford Courier and Mazda B-Series utilities utilising Mitsubishi's 2.6-litre Astron four-cylinder engine, and a proposal to replace Mitsubishi's locally built Colt with a rebadged Toyota Corolla. This proposal, however, never eventuated.

Holden initially teamed up with Nissan in 1984, where the Nissan Pulsar was sold as the Holden Astra. Later Pulsar and Astra models in Australia used Holden-sourced powertrains. This arrangement dissolved in 1989, and Holden and Toyota formed United Australian Automobile Industries. The vehicles produced as a result of this joint venture, the Holden Apollo (Toyota Camry), Holden Nova (Toyota Corolla) and Toyota Lexcen (Holden Commodore) lasted until 1996 for the Holden-badged derivatives models, and 1997 for Lexcen.

From 1988 to 1994, Ford Australia rebadged the Y60 Patrol as the Ford Maverick. The car was mechanically similar, although the Nissan version had rear disc brakes depending on vehicle grade, while the Ford mostly had drum brakes and featured different paint colours and trim levels.

== Outcomes ==
This sharing of models proved unpopular with buyers, and also with manufacturers, each of which kept the best models in the relevant ranges for itself. Consequently, the original models outsold their badge-engineered counterparts; for example, the Toyota Corolla and Camry outsold the Holden Nova and Apollo seven to one. The last of such models, the Toyota Lexcen (Holden Commodore), was dropped in 1997.

Rather than share locally assembled models with other manufacturers, Holden, Ford and Toyota decided to import fully built-up models from subsidiaries elsewhere in the world, mainly Europe and Japan.

Nissan ended car manufacturing in Australia completely in 1994. Mitsubishi Motors, which did not share any models with other manufacturers during the period of the plan, ended Australian manufacturing in 2008. Ford ceased Australian production in 2016, whereas Holden and Toyota did so in 2017, leaving no large scale, mass market Australian production of cars.

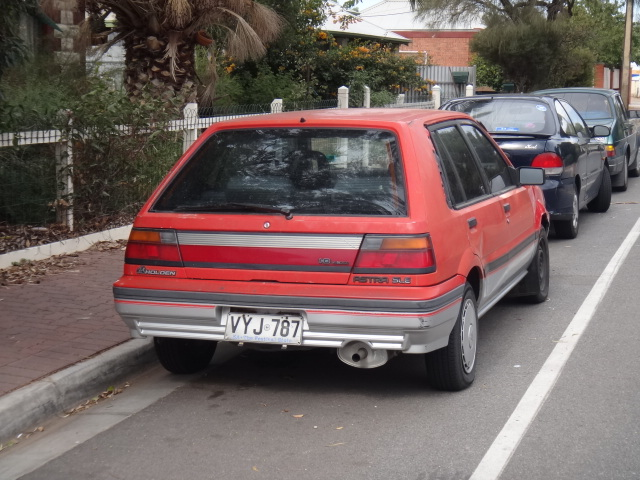
Holden Astra from 1987

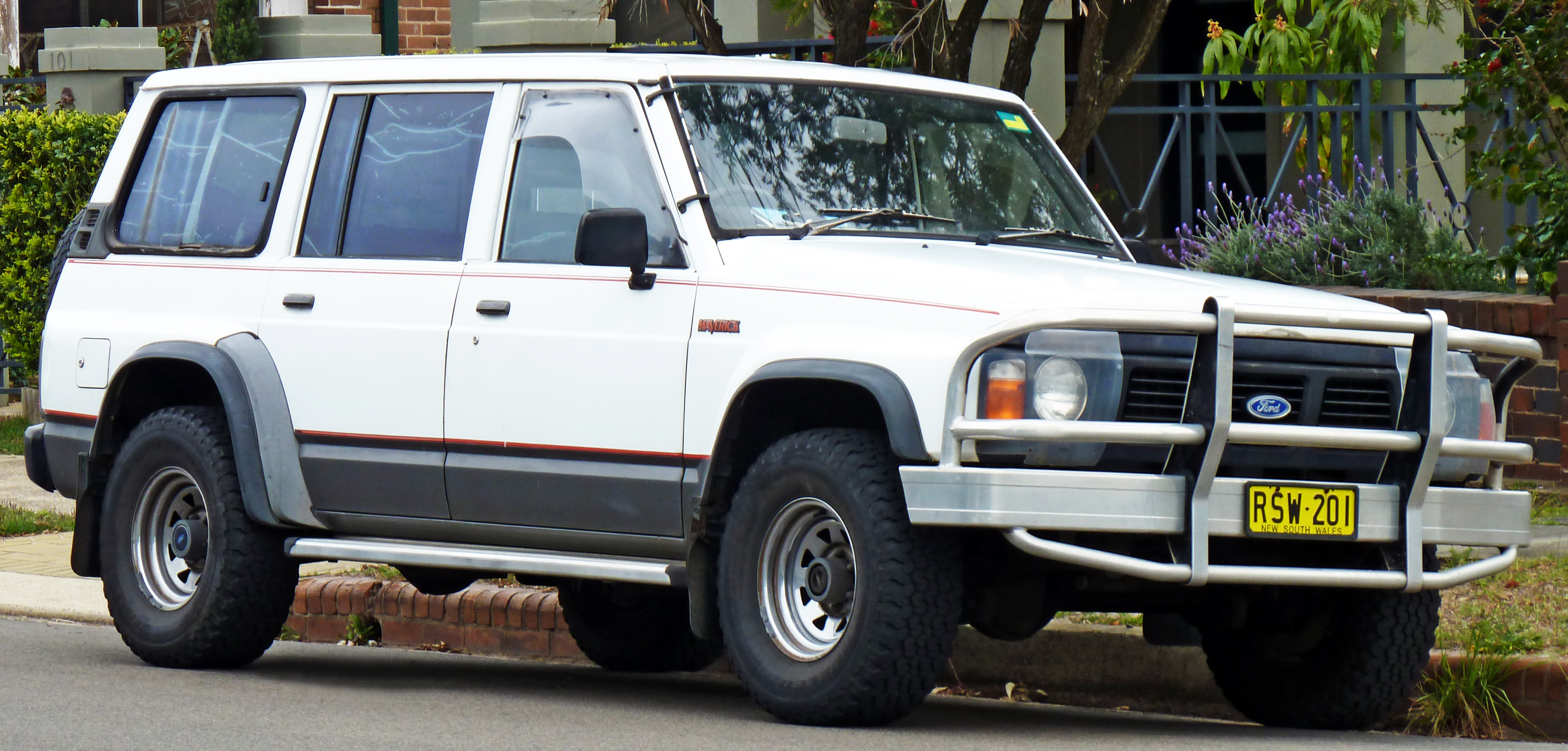
Ford Maverick from 1988

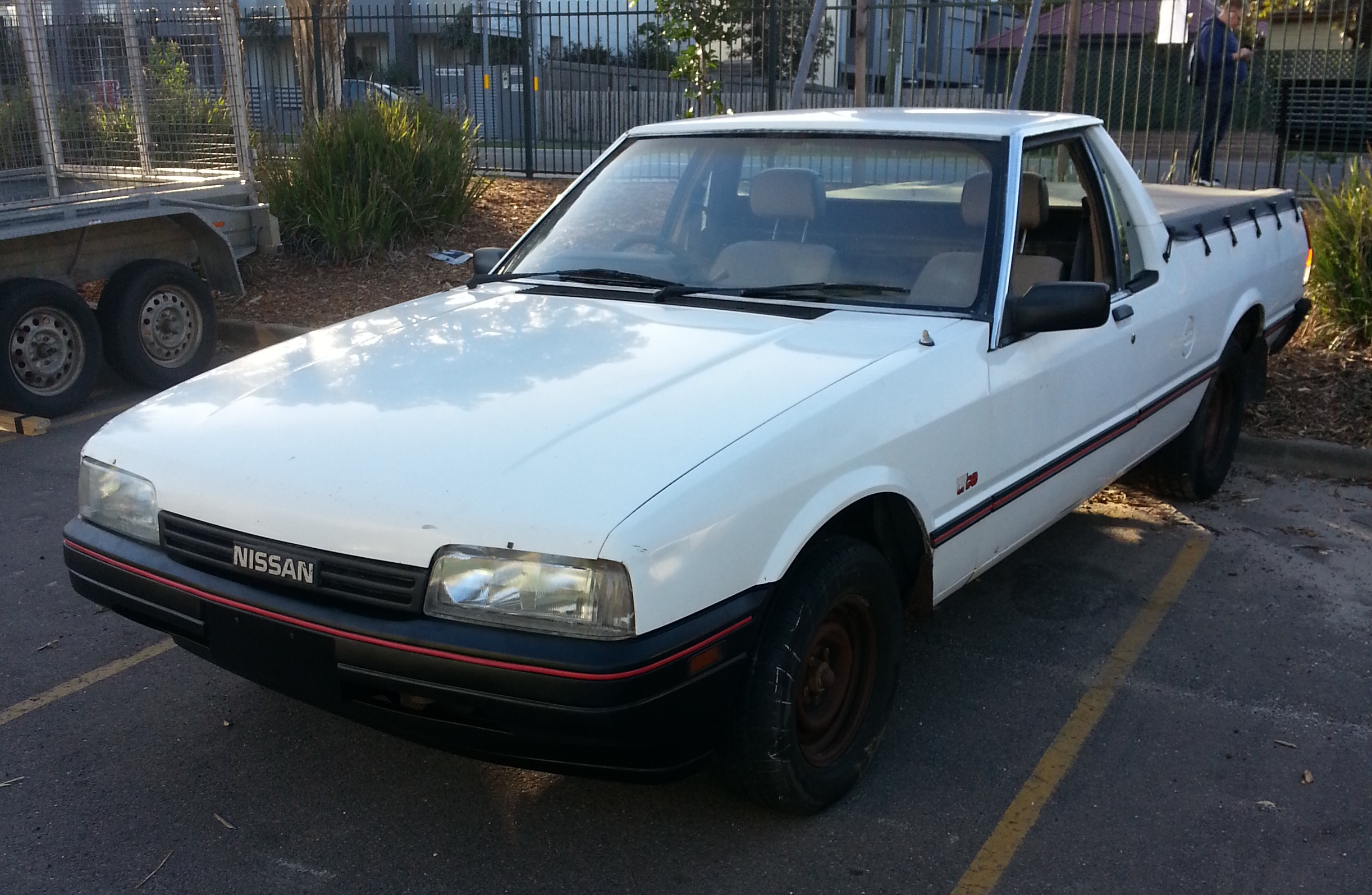
Nissan Ute from 1989

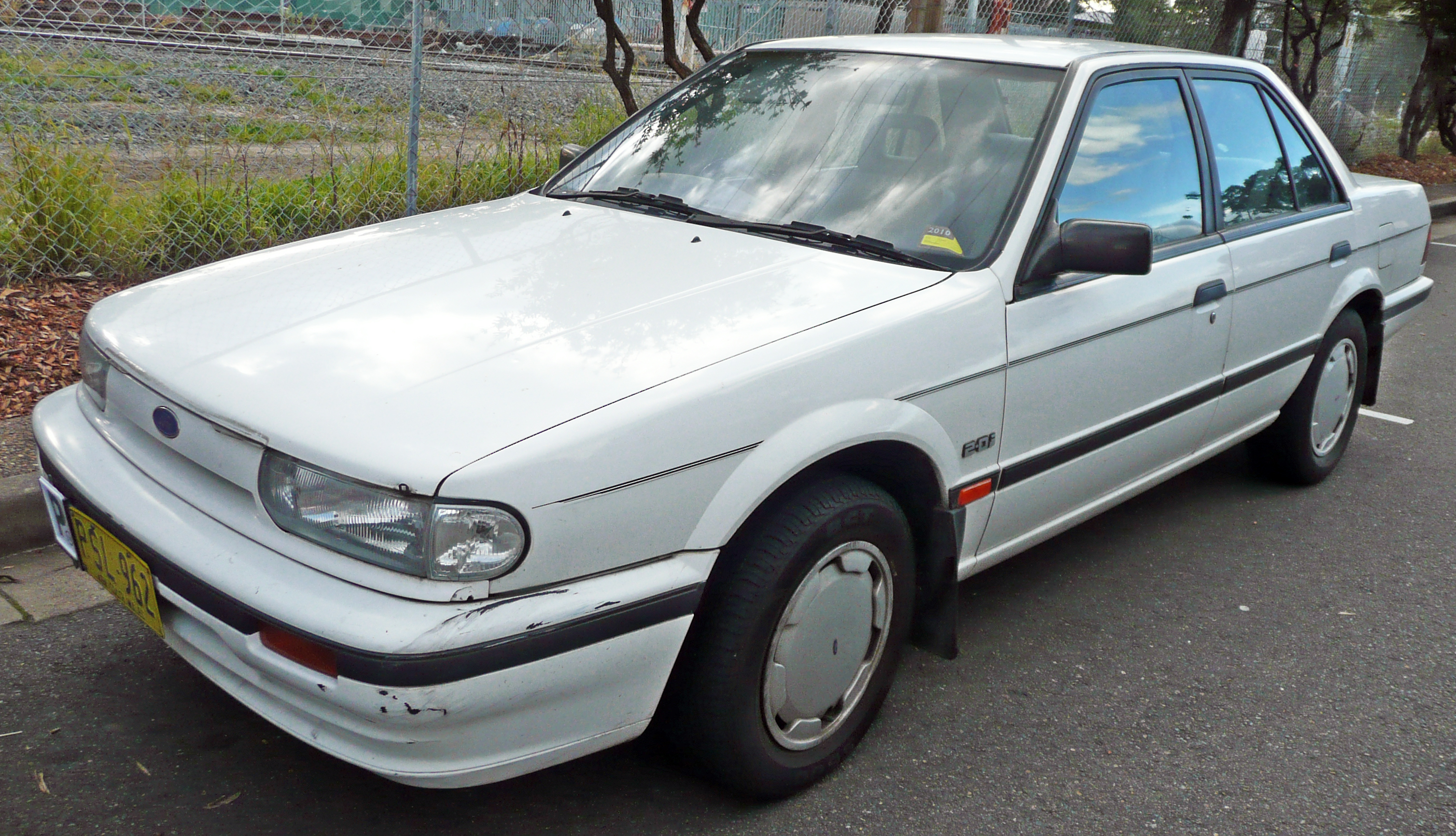
Ford Corsair from 1989

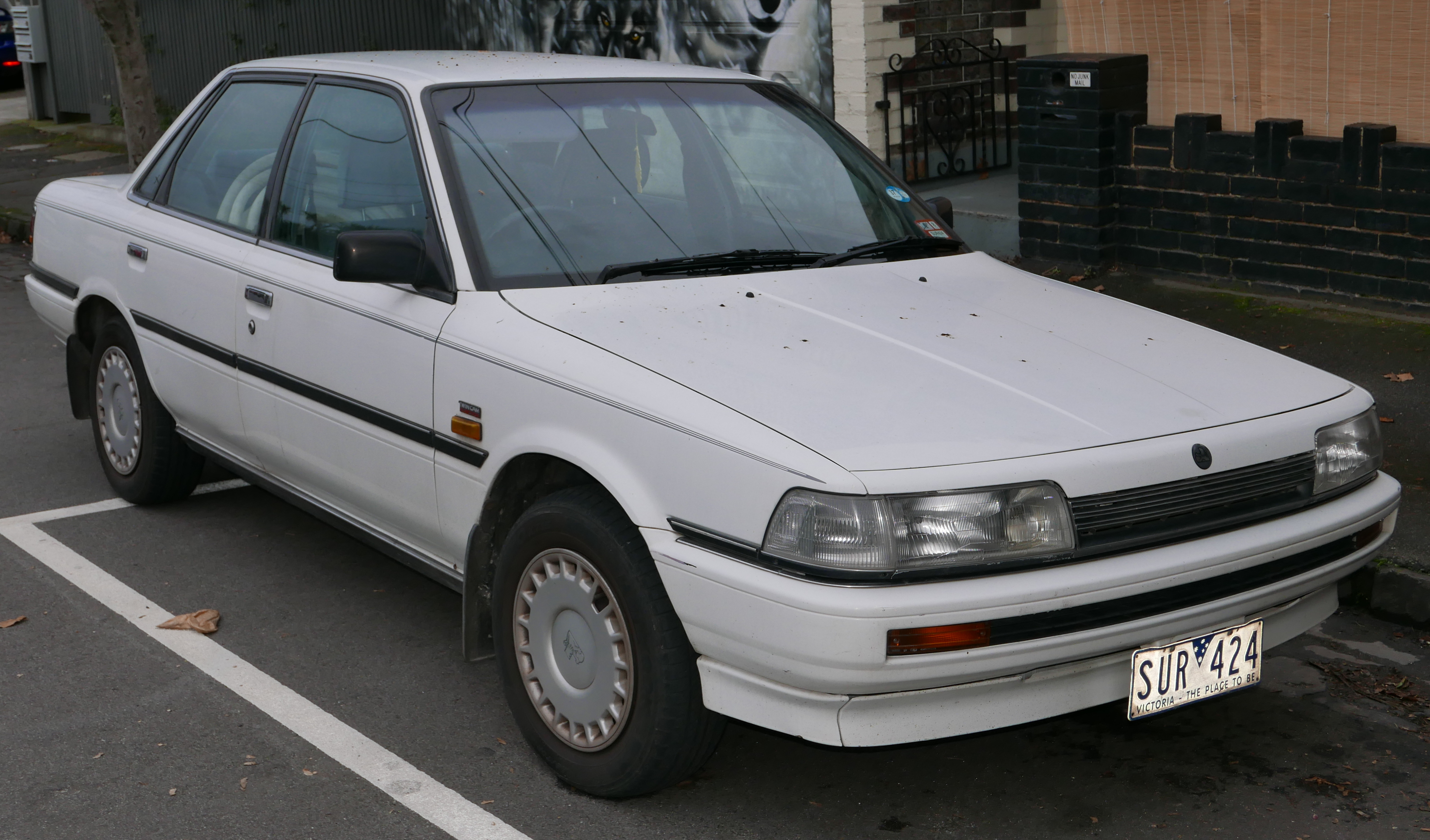
Holden Apollo from 1989

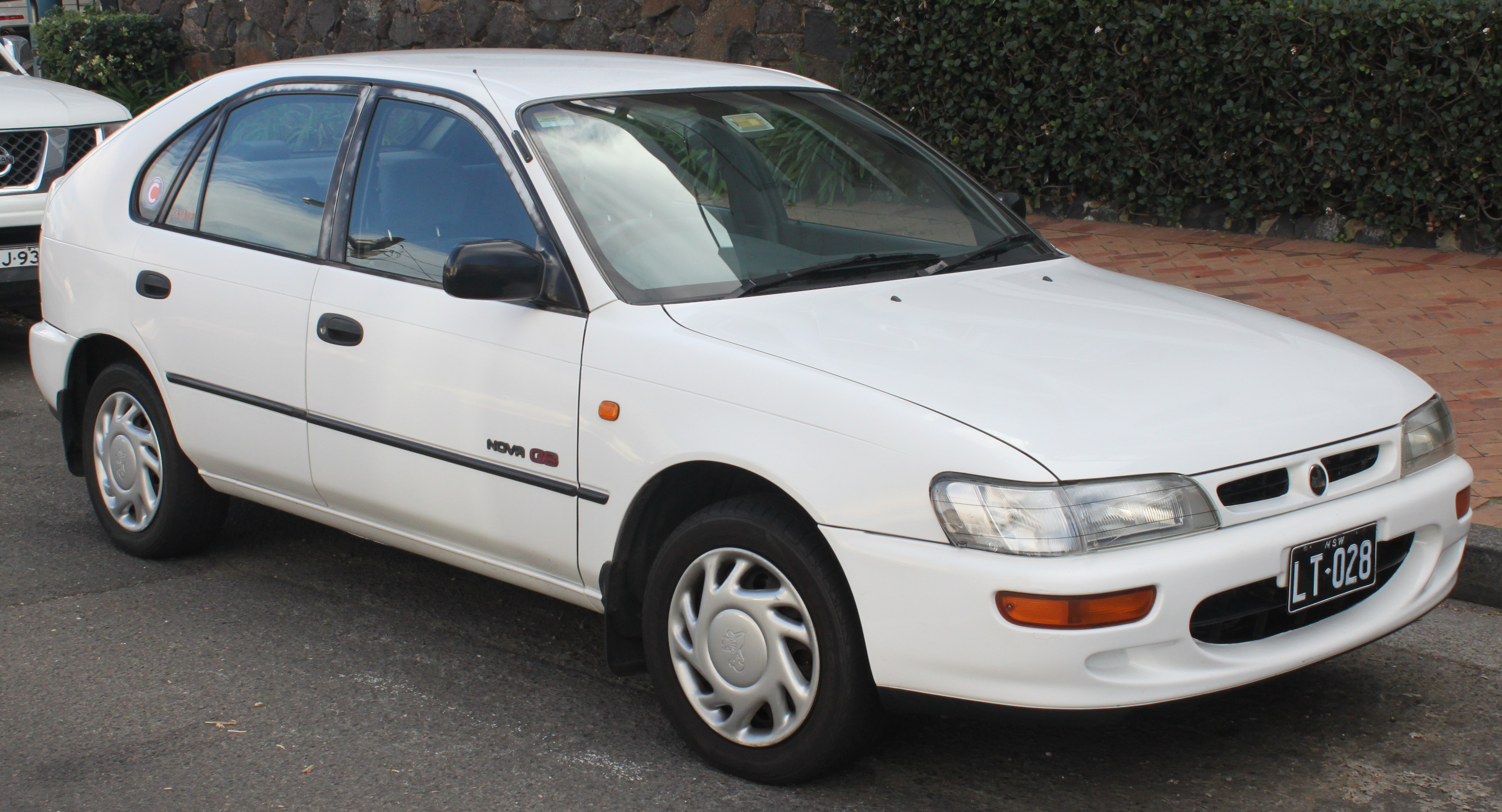
Holden Nova second generation from the mid-1990s

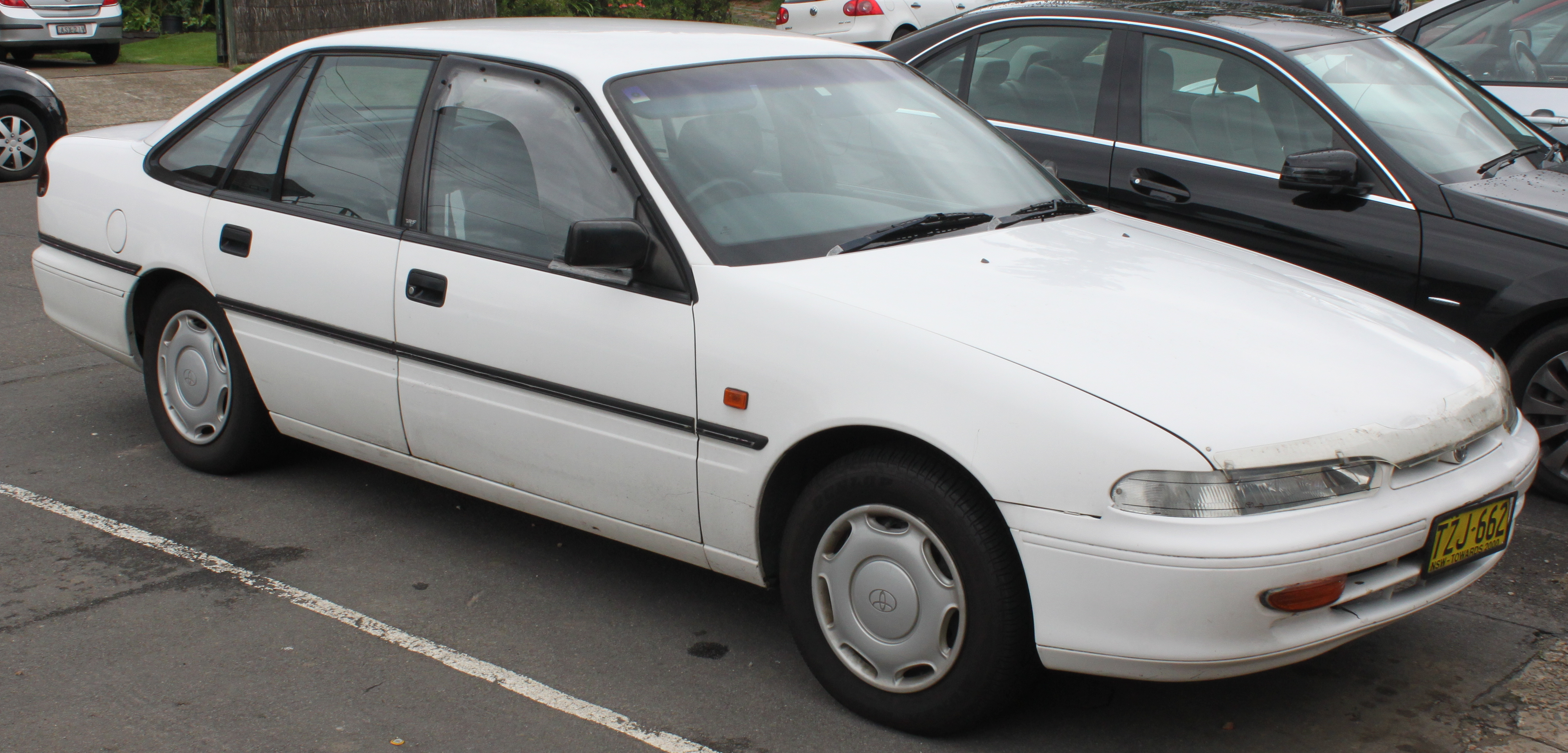
Toyota Lexcen from 1995
