= Holden Apollo =

Compact and mid-size car from Holden

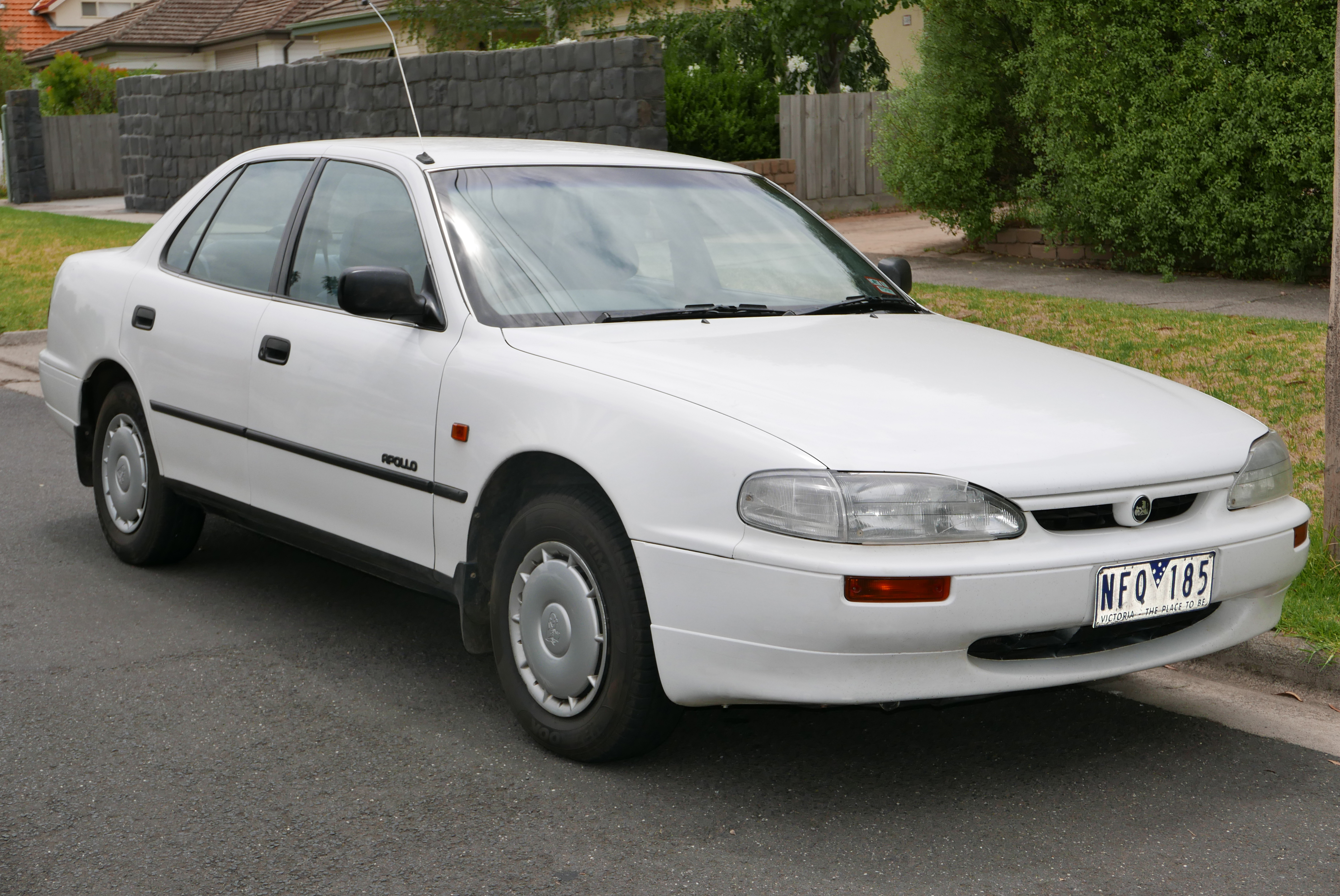

Overview
- Manufacturer: Holden (General Motors)
- Production: 1989–1997
- Assembly: Australia: Port Melbourne, Victoria (1989–1994); Altona, Victoria (1994–1996)

Body and chassis
- Class: Mid-size
- Body style: 4-door sedan 5-door estate
- Layout: Front-engine, front-wheel-drive

Chronology
- Predecessor: Holden Camira
- Successor: Holden Vectra

The Holden Apollo is a compact and later mid-size car that was distributed from 1989 to 1997 in Australia by Holden. As a successor to the GM-engineered Holden Camira, the Apollo was a badge engineered version of the Toyota Camry, also sold in Australia. In paralleling two generations of the Camry—the V20 coded as the JK and facelifted JL series Apollo—and the XV10 recoded as the JM and updated JP—there were minor cosmetic differences in the grille, lights and trim.

This model sharing occurred due to the United Australian Automobile Industries (UAAI) joint venture between Toyota Australia and Holden starting in 1987 that resulted in model sharing between both automakers from August 1989. UAAI was in turn a result of the Button car plan, which aimed to make the Australian motor business more efficient and eliminate import tariffs. Production ceased in late 1996, although enough cars remained until the replacement Holden Vectra arrived in mid-1997. It was produced at Toyota's Port Melbourne plant until 1994 and then at Altona.

== Timeline ==
- August 1989 – JK Apollo released
- August 1991 – JL Apollo released
- March 1993 – JM Apollo released
- September 1995 – JP Apollo released
- Late 1996 – Production ends
- June 1997 – Apollo replaced by Holden Vectra

== Gallery ==
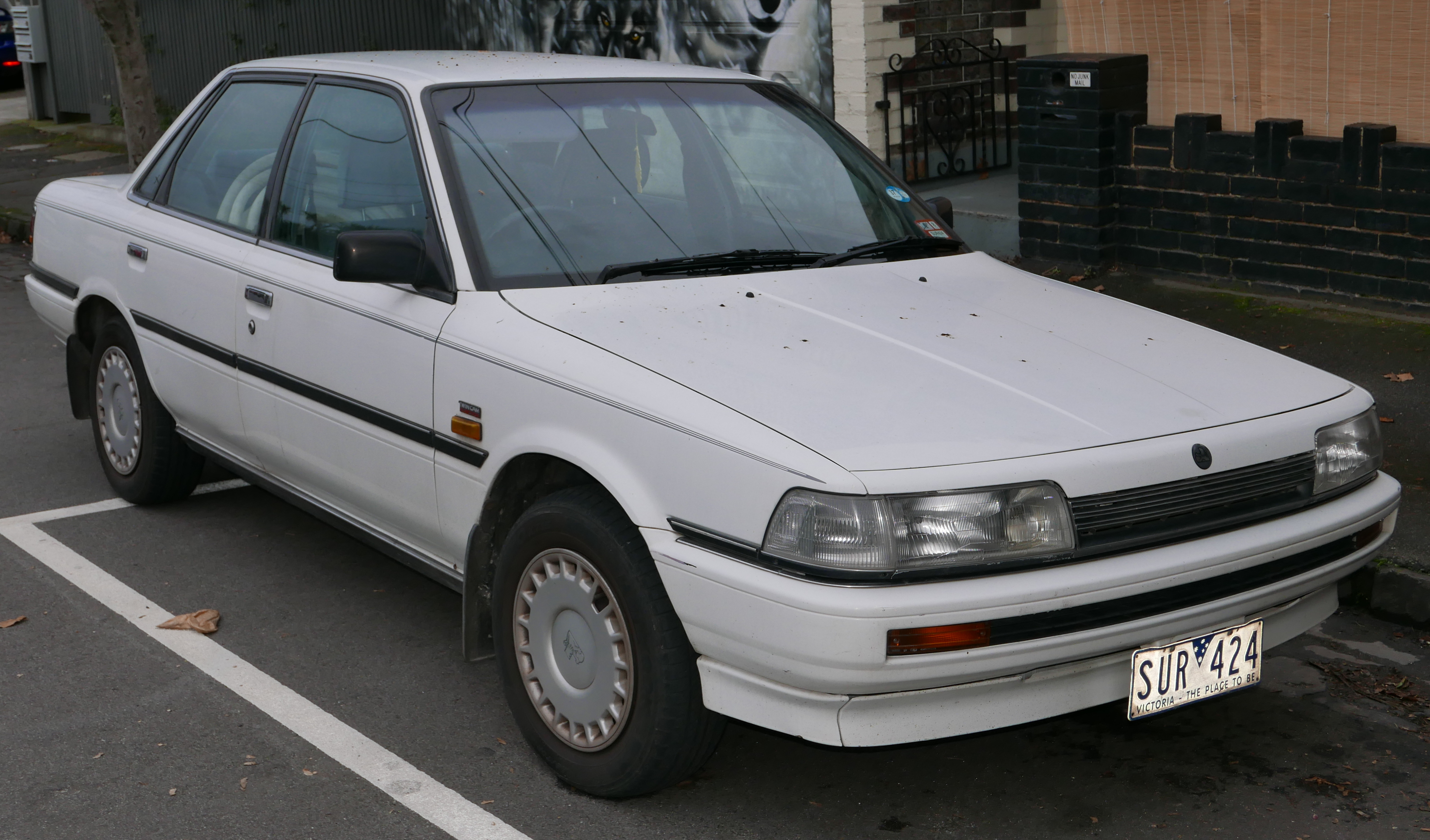
First generation (JK, JL; 1989–1992)

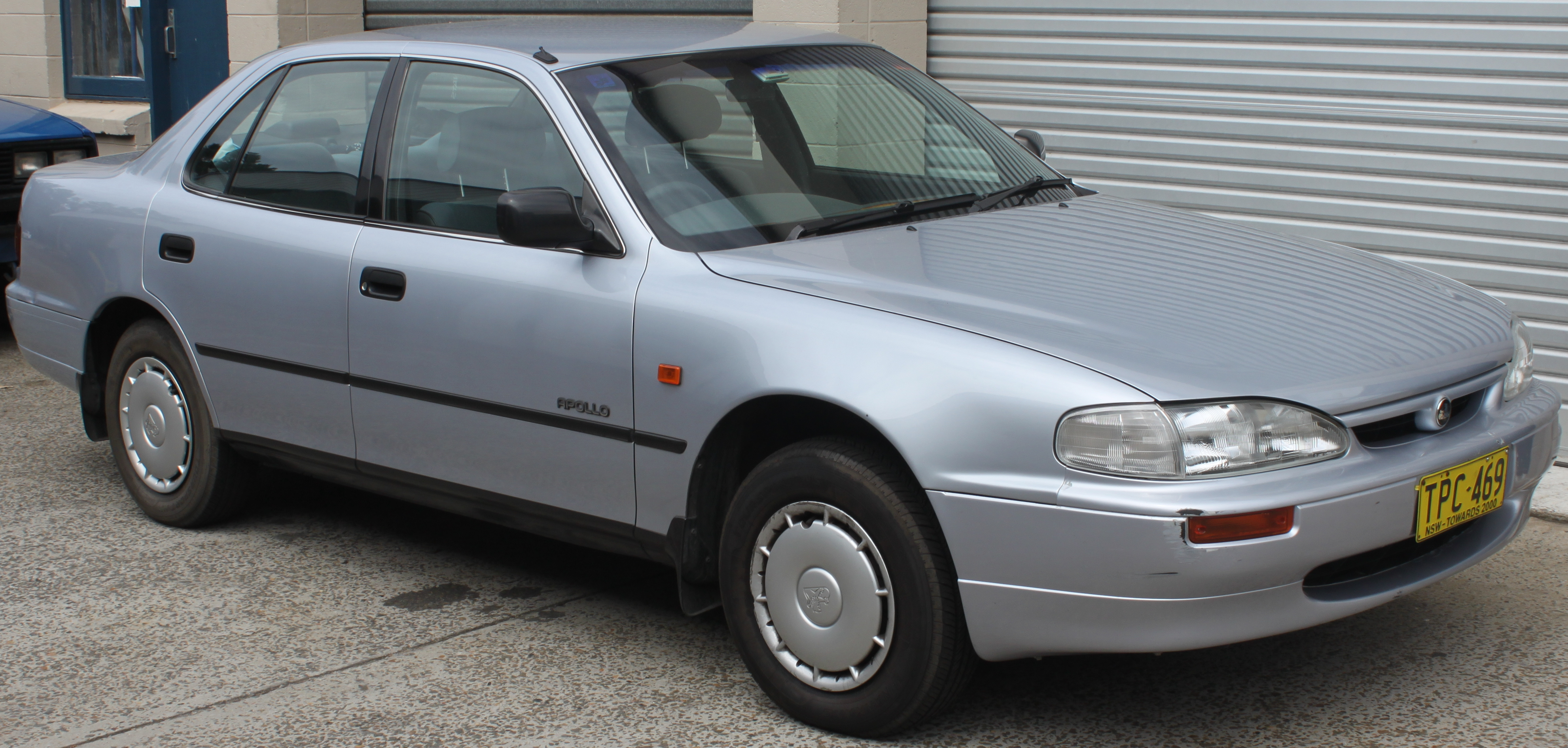
Second generation (JM, JP; 1993–1996)
