= Toyota Australia Altona Plant =

Automobile manufacturing facility in Victoria

- Built: 1978
- Location: Grieve Parade; Altona North, Victoria, Australia
- Coordinates: 37°50′08″S 144°49′52″E
- Industry: Motor vehicle assembly
- Products: Holden Apollo; Holden Nova; Toyota Aurion; Toyota Avalon; Toyota Camry; Toyota Corolla
- Employees: 2,500 (2014)
- Area: 75 ha (190 acres)
- Owner: Toyota Australia
- Defunct: 3 October 2017

The Toyota Australia Altona Plant was a Toyota Australia manufacturing facility in the Melbourne suburb of Altona North.

== History ==
The Toyota Australia Altona Plant opened in 1978, as Toyota's first engine plant outside of Japan. Panel production began in 1983, before full vehicle production commenced in July 1994 with manufacture of the Corolla transferred from Port Melbourne followed in January 1995 by the Camry. The expanded plant built by John Holland was opened by Prime Minister Paul Keating.

Altona also manufactured the badge engineered Holden Apollo and Holden Novas. It exported cars to Brunei, Kuwait, New Zealand, Oman, Qatar, Saudi Arabia, Thailand and the United Arab Emirates.

In August 2012, Altona competed its one millionth vehicle for export. In February 2014 Toyota announced the plant would close after it decided it would cease production in Australia. This occurred in October 2017.

The site was redeveloped with the former manufacturing building converted into a redevelopment facility which included vehicle design and testing studios, training rooms, a mock sales dealership, auditorium and 400 person bistro. In 2024 Toyota began assembling and distributing stationary hydrogen fuel cell power generators at Altona.
