= 1990 Tooheys 1000 =

Motor race in Australia

1990 Bathurst 1000

Seasons
- ← 1989 1991 →

Layout of the Mount Panorama Circuit

The 1990 Bathurst 1000, known for naming rights reasons as the 1990 Tooheys 1000, was a motor race held on 30 September 1990 at the Mount Panorama Circuit, Bathurst, New South Wales, Australia. The event was open to Group A touring cars, with three engine capacity classes.

The race, which was Round 2 of both the 1990 Australian Endurance Championship and the 1990 Australian Manufacturers' Championship, It was won by the Holden Racing Team Holden Commodore VL of Win Percy and Allan Grice over the Dick Johnson Racing Ford Sierra RS500 of Jeff Allam and Paul Radisich and the Perkins Engineering Holden Commodore VL of Larry Perkins and Tomas Mezera.

The Bill O'Brien and Brian Sampson Holden Commodore was initially classified as a non-finisher having crossed the line half a second ahead of the race winning car and failing to complete another lap. It was reinstated to eight place upon an appeal to the Confederation of Australian Motorsport.

== Class structure ==
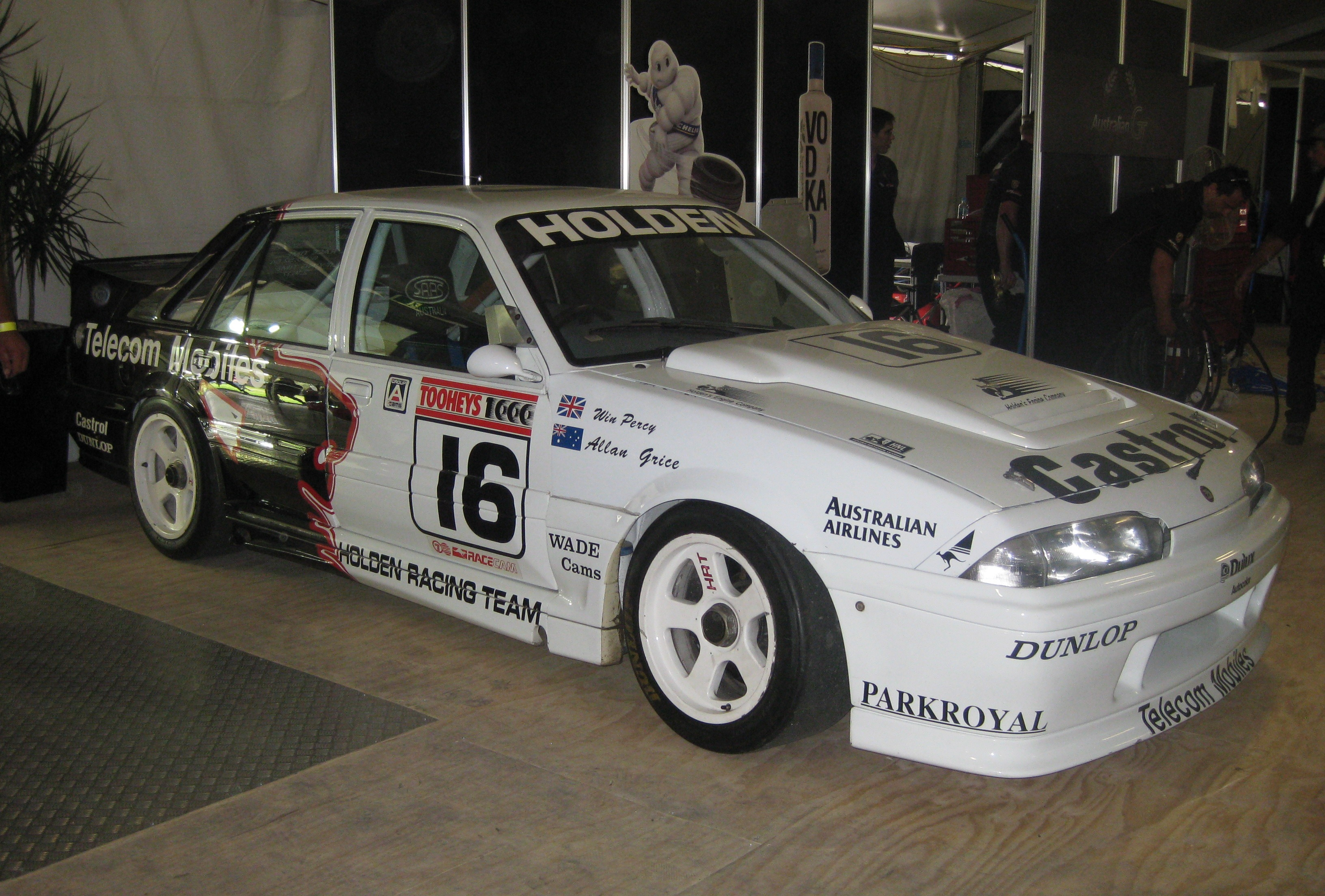
The race winning Holden VL Commodore SS Group A SV of Win Percy and Allan Grice

Cars competed in three divisions as follows:

=== Division 1: 3001cc and Over ===
Division 1 featured Ford Sierra RS500s, Nissan Skylines, Toyota Supras, Holden Commodore VLs and a BMW 635CSi.

=== Division 2: 1601 to 3000cc ===
Division 2 was composed of BMW M3s, a BMW 323i and a Mercedes-Benz 190E.

=== Division 3: Up to 1600cc ===
Division 3 was composed exclusively of various models of Toyota Corolla.

== Tooheys Top Ten ==
Pos	No	Team	Driver	Car	TTT	Qual
Pole	10	Allan Moffat Enterprises	(Germany) Klaus Niedzwiedz	Ford Sierra RS500	2:13.94	2:15.00
2	17	Shell Ultra Hi Racing	(Australia) Dick Johnson	Ford Sierra RS500	2:14.17	2:14.26
3	05	Mobil 1 Racing	(Australia) Peter Brock	Ford Sierra RS500	2:14.71	2:14.72
4	35	Peter Jackson Racing	(Australia) Glenn Seton	Ford Sierra RS500	2:15.77	2:14.44
5	25	Benson & Hedges Racing	(Australia) Tony Longhurst	Ford Sierra RS500	2:16.01	2:13.84
6	16	Holden Racing Team	(Australia) Allan Grice	Holden VL Commodore SS Group A SV	2:16.17	2:15.62
7	11	Perkins Engineering	(Australia) Larry Perkins	Holden VL Commodore SS Group A SV	2:17.03	2:14.82
8	9	Allan Moffat Enterprises	(Australia) Gregg Hansford	Ford Sierra RS500	2:17.97	2:15.20
9	40	Mark Petch Motorsport	(Italy) Gianfranco Brancatelli	Ford Sierra RS500	2:23.05	2:15.32
10	20	Benson & Hedges Racing	(Australia) Alan Jones	Ford Sierra RS500	3:21.93	2:13.84

== Official results ==
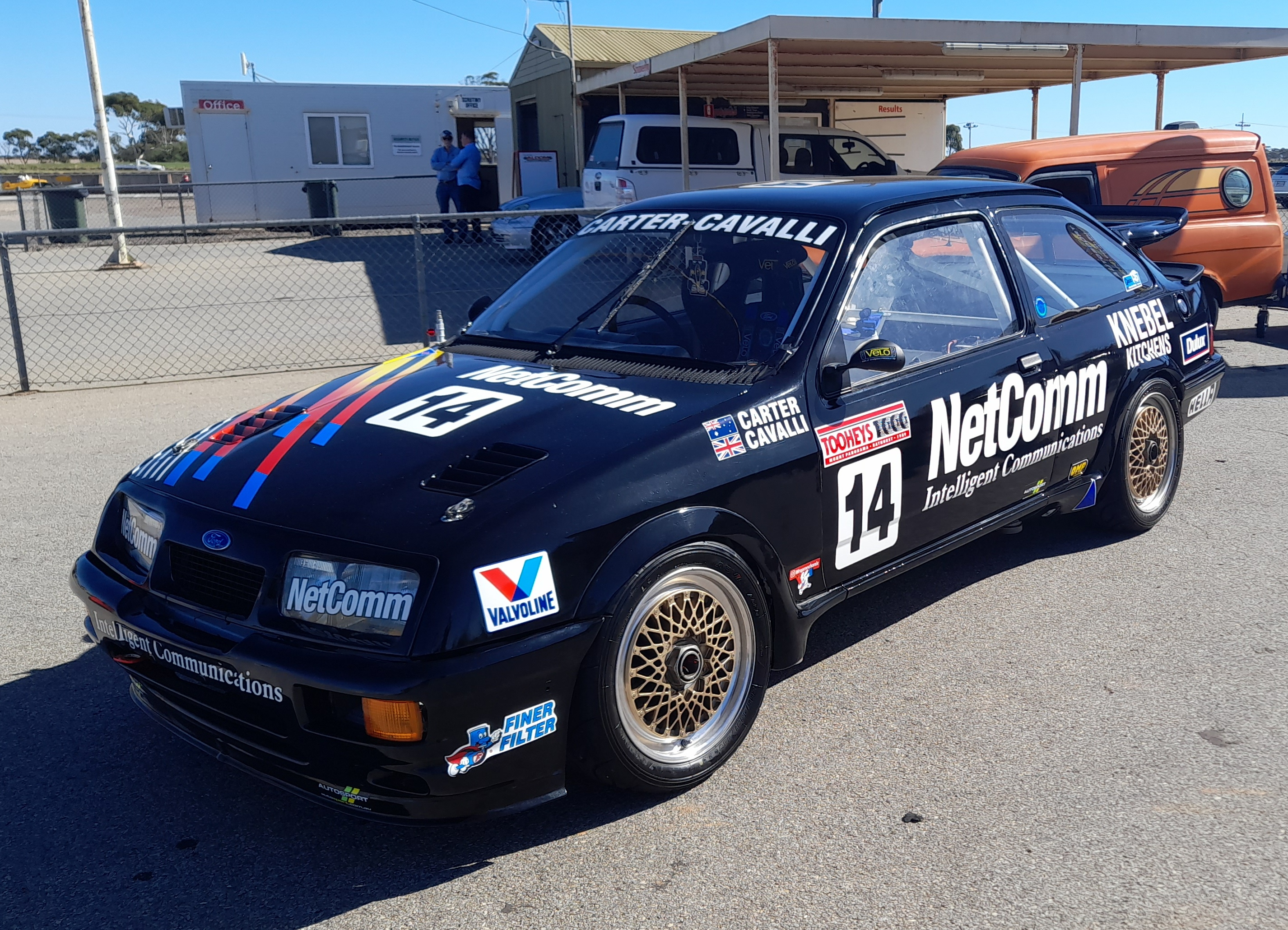
The Ford Sierra RS500 that was driven by Murray Carter and Matt Wacker. The car is pictured in 2023.

Pos	Division	No	Team	Drivers	Car	Laps	Qual Pos	Shootout Pos
1	1	16	Holden Racing Team	(United Kingdom) Win Percy (Australia) Allan Grice	Holden VL Commodore SS Group A SV	161	10	6
2	1	18	Shell Ultra Hi Racing	(United Kingdom) Jeff Allam (New Zealand) Paul Radisich	Ford Sierra RS500	161	13	
3	1	11	Perkins Engineering	(Australia) Larry Perkins (Australia) Tomas Mezera	Holden VL Commodore SS Group A SV	161	6	7
4	1	05	Mobil 1 Racing	(Australia) Peter Brock (United Kingdom) Andy Rouse	Ford Sierra RS500	160	5	3
5	1	7	Holden Racing Team	(Australia) Brad Jones (Australia) Neil Crompton	Holden VL Commodore SS Group A SV	159	16	
6	1	28	Playscape Racing	(Australia) Kevin Waldock (Australia) Mike Preston	Ford Sierra RS500	159	18	
7	1	38	Gullivers Travels Inc.	(New Zealand) Andrew Bagnall (New Zealand) Robbie Francevic	Ford Sierra RS500	155	17	
8	1	39	Everlast Battery Service	(Australia) Bill O'Brien (Australia) Brian Sampson	Holden VL Commodore SS Group A SV	153	31	
9	1	23	Chris Lambden	(United Kingdom) Chris Lambden (Australia) Greg Crick	Nissan Skyline HR31 GTS-R	151	25	
10	1	10	Allan Moffat Enterprises	(Germany) Klaus Niedzwiedz (Germany) Frank Biela (Belgium) Pierre Dieudonné	Ford Sierra RS500	151	7	1
11	1	6	Mobil 1 Racing	(Australia) Andrew Miedecke (Australia) Charlie O'Brien (Australia) David Parsons	Ford Sierra RS500	149	14	
12	2	51	Phil Ward Racing	(Australia) Phil Ward (Australia) John Goss	Mercedes-Benz 190E	148	38	
13	1	21	Bob Forbes Racing	(Australia) Mark Gibbs (Australia) Rohan Onslow	Holden VL Commodore SS Group A SV	148	21	
14	2	52	M3 Motorsport	(Australia) Peter Doulman (Australia) John Cotter	BMW M3	147	47	
15	1	33	Pro-Duct Motorsport	(Australia) Bob Pearson (Australia) Bruce Stewart	Holden VL Commodore SS Group A SV	147	32	
16	1	34	Ray Gulson	(Australia) Ray Gulson (Australia) Graham Gulson	BMW 635 CSi	147	43	
17	1	13	Bob Forbes Motorsport	(Australia) Kevin Bartlett (Australia) Russell Ingall (Australia) Rohan Onslow	Holden VL Commodore SS Group A SV	146	24	
18	1	1	Nissan Motorsport Australia	(New Zealand) Jim Richards (Australia) Mark Skaife	Nissan Skyline R32 GT-R	146	11	
19	1	12	Ray Lintott	(Australia) Ray Lintott (Australia) Gary Rush (Australia) Terry Shiel	Ford Sierra RS500	143	19	
20	1	46	Garry Willmington Performance	(Australia) Garry Willmington (Australia) Bryan Thomson	Toyota Supra Turbo	143	40	
21	1	43	Brian Callaghan	(Australia) Jason Bargwanna (Australia) Brian Callaghan Jr (Australia) John Gerwald	Holden VL Commodore SS Group A	143	41	
22	3	78	Phoenix Motorsport	(Australia) Geoff Full (Australia) David Ratcliff	Toyota Sprinter	142	49	
23	1	44	Paul Trevathan	(Australia) Paul Trevathan (Australia) Andrew McDowell	Holden VL Commodore SS Group A	138	45	
24	2	53	Brian Bolwell Racing	(Australia) Brian Bolwell (Australia) David Pullen	BMW 323i	137	55	
25	3	72	David Sala	(Australia) David Sala (Australia) Richard Vorst	Toyota Corolla	134	54	
26	1	19	Car Trek Racing	(Australia) Bob Jones (New Zealand) Heather Spurle	Holden VL Commodore SS Group A SV	133	42	
27	3	70	Toyota Team Australia	(Australia) Paul Stokell (Australia) Mike Dowson (New Zealand) John Faulkner	Toyota Corolla FX-GT	130	48	
DNF	1	9	Allan Moffat Enterprises	(Australia) Gregg Hansford (Belgium) Pierre Dieudonné (Germany) Klaus Niedzwiedz	Ford Sierra RS500	138	8	8
DNF	1	30	Peter Jackson Racing	(Australia) George Fury (Australia) Drew Price (United Kingdom) David Sears	Ford Sierra RS500	125	12	
DNF	1	37	Brian Callaghan	(Australia) Brian Callaghan (Australia) Barry Graham	Holden VL Commodore SS Group A SV	120	23	
DNF	1	40	Mark Petch Motorsport	(Italy) Gianfranco Brancatelli (United Kingdom) Robb Gravett	Ford Sierra RS500	118	9	9
NC	1	14	Netcomm Australia	(Australia) Murray Carter (Australia) Matt Wacker	Ford Sierra RS500	116	28	
DNF	1	15	Toyota Team Australia	(Australia) John Smith (Australia) Peter McKay (Australia) Mark Poole	Toyota Supra Turbo A	112	30	
DNF	3	76	Peter Verheyen	(Australia) Peter Verheyen (Australia) Ron Searle (Australia) Russell Becker	Toyota Sprinter	109	50	
DNF	3	73	Bob Holden Motors	(Australia) Bob Holden (Australia) Mike Conway (Australia) Garry Jones	Toyota Sprinter	101	53	
DNF	1	17	Shell Ultra Hi Racing	(Australia) Dick Johnson (Australia) John Bowe	Ford Sierra RS500	94	3	2
DNF	1	22	Lusty Engineering	(Australia) Graham Lusty (New Zealand) Peter Janson	Holden VL Commodore SS Group A SV	83	33	
NC	1	45	Lester Smerdon	(Australia) Lester Smerdon (Australia) Warren Jonsson	Holden VL Commodore SS Group A SV	83	37	
DNF	2	54	Bryce Racing	(New Zealand) Brett Riley (New Zealand) Craig Baird	BMW M3	82	34	
DNF	1	35	Peter Jackson Racing	(Australia) Glenn Seton (Australia) Drew Price (United Kingdom) David Sears	Ford Sierra RS500	77	4	4
DNF	1	4	Lansvale Smash Repairs	(Australia) Steve Reed (Australia) Trevor Ashby	Holden VL Commodore SS Group A SV	76	20	
DNF	1	42	Lusty Engineering	(Australia) John Lusty (Australia) Bernie Stack	Holden VL Commodore SS Group A SV	66	27	
DNF	1	20	Benson & Hedges Racing	(Australia) Alan Jones (New Zealand) Denny Hulme (Australia) Mark McLaughlin	Ford Sierra RS500	65	2	10
DNF	1	2	Alf Grant	(Australia) Alf Grant (Australia) Tim Grant	Nissan Skyline HR31 GTS-R	65	36	
DNF	1	32	Hersonne Engineering	(Australia) Laurie Donaher (Australia) Marc Ducquet	Holden VL Commodore SS Group A	64	44	
DNF	3	75	Bob Holden Motors	(Australia) Dennis Rogers (Australia) Garry Jones (Australia) Llynden Riethmuller	Toyota Corolla	60	52	
DNF	3	71	Toyota Team Australia	(New Zealand) John Faulkner (Australia) Neal Bates	Toyota Corolla FX-GT	59	46	
DNF	1	3	Search for a Champion	(Australia) Peter Gazzard (Australia) Rick Bates	Holden VL Commodore SS Group A SV	57	35	
DNF	1	25	Benson & Hedges Racing	(Australia) Tony Longhurst (Australia) Mark McLaughlin (Australia) Alan Jones	Ford Sierra RS500	53	1	5
DNF	1	29	Alcair Air Conditioning	(Australia) Wayne Park (Australia) John English	Holden VL Commodore SS Group A SV	51	29	
DNF	1	8	Caltex CXT Racing Team	(Australia) Colin Bond (New Zealand) Graeme Crosby	Ford Sierra RS500	44	15	
DNF	1	27	Terry Finnigan	(Australia) Terry Finnigan (Australia) Geoff Leeds	Holden VL Commodore SS Group A SV	37	26	
DSQ	1	41	Tony Mulvihill	(Australia) Tony Muvihill (Australia) Glenn McIntyre (Australia) Dave Barrow	Holden VL Commodore SS Group A SV	18	39	
DNF	1	26	Garry Rogers Motorsport	(Australia) Graham Moore (Australia) Garry Rogers	Holden VL Commodore SS Group A SV	0	22	
DNS	3	74	Alexander Rotary	(Australia) Keith McCulloch (Australia) Phil Alexander	Toyota Corolla		51	

== Statistics ==
- Provisional Pole Position - #25 Tony Longhurst - 2:13.84
- Pole Position - #10 Klaus Niedzwiedz - 2:13.94
- Fastest Lap - #1 Mark Skaife - 2:15.46 (165.12 km/h) - Lap 98 (new lap record)
- Race time of winning car - 6:40:52.64
- Race average of winning car - 149.72 km/h

== See also ==
- 1990 Australian Touring Car season
