= Toyota Corolla (E90) =

Sixth generation of Toyota Corolla

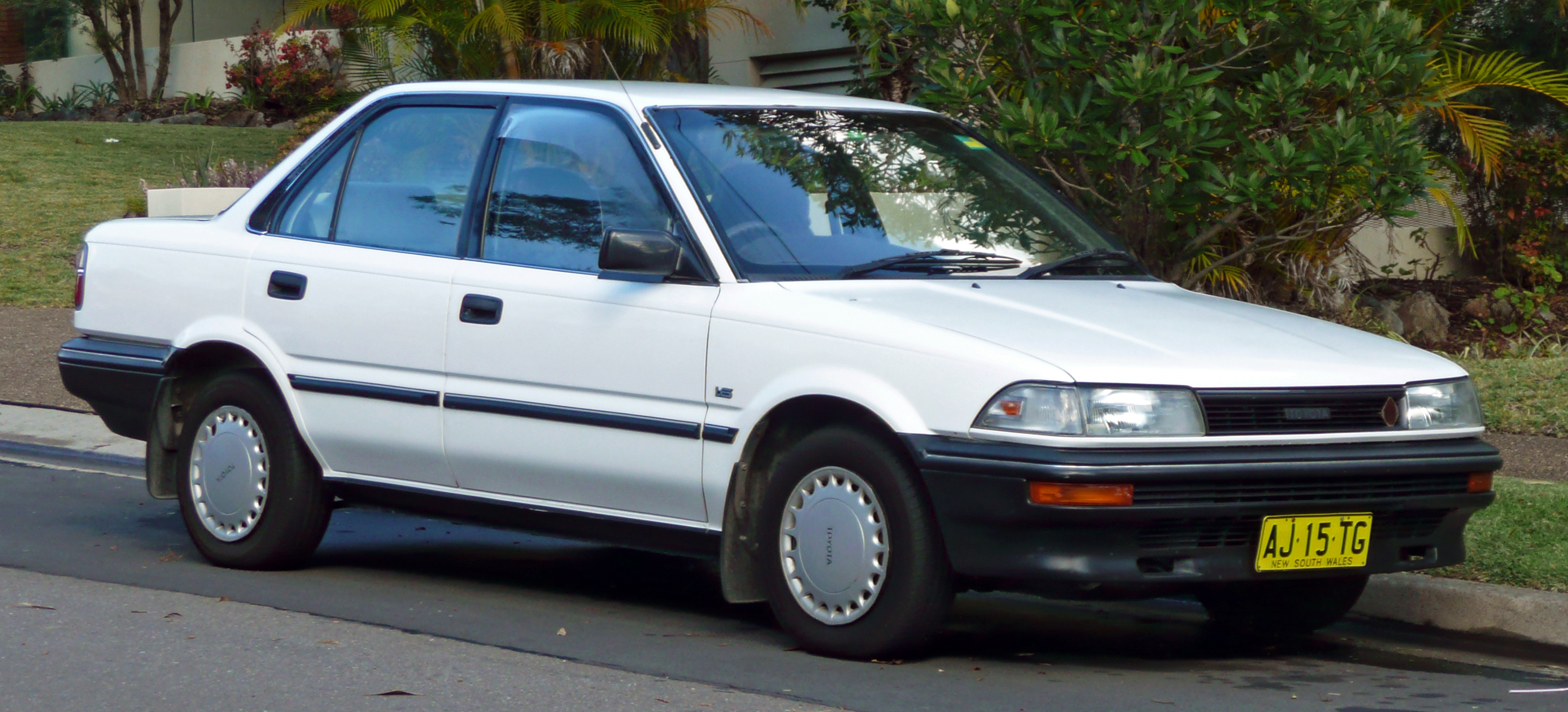
- Pre-facelift Toyota Corolla 1.6 CS sedan (AE92, Australia)

Overview
- Manufacturer: Toyota
- Model code: E90
- Also called: Toyota Corolla Levin/Sprinter Trueno (coupé); Toyota Conquest/Tazz (5-door hatchback, South Africa); Toyota Corolla Small Body (Philippines); Toyota Sprinter (Japan); Toyota Sprinter Carib (wagon, Japan); Toyota Sprinter Cielo (liftback, Japan); Toyota Carri (panel van, South Africa); Geo Prizm (North America); Holden Nova (Australia)
- Production: 1987–1992; March 1989 – June 1994 (Australia); 1988–2006 (South Africa)
- Model years: 1988–1992
- Assembly: Japan: Toyota City; Australia: Melbourne, Victoria (TMCA); Canada: Cambridge, Ontario (TMMC); Indonesia: North Jakarta (Toyota Astra Motor); Malaysia: Shah Alam (UMW Toyota Motor); New Zealand: Thames; Philippines: Parañaque (TMP); South Africa: Durban; Thailand: Samrong Tai (Samrong plant); United States: Fremont, California (NUMMI)
- Designer: Seiiji Fukushima (1984)

Body and chassis
- Body style: 2-door coupé; 3/5-door hatchback; 4-door sedan; 5-door liftback; 5-door station wagon/van
- Layout: Front engine, front-wheel-drive / four-wheel-drive

Powertrain
- Engine: Petrol: 1295 cc 2E I4; 1397 cc 6A-FC I4; 1456 cc 3E I4; 1498 cc 5A-F/FE/FHE I4; 1587 cc 4A-F/FE I4; 1587 cc 4A-GE I4; 1587 cc 4A-GZE supercharged I4; 1762 cc 7A-FE I4; Diesel: 1839 cc 1C-II/III I4; 1973 cc 2C-III I4
- Transmission: 4/5-speed manual; 3/4-speed automatic

Dimensions
- Wheelbase: 2,431 mm (95.7 in)
- Length: Sedan: 4,195 mm (165.2 in); Hatchback: 3,995 mm (157.3 in); Liftback & Coupé: 4,374 mm (172.2 in); Wagon: 4,356–4,369 mm (171.5–172 in)
- Width: 1,656 mm (65.2 in); 1988 Liftback, Wagon & Coupé: 1,666 mm (65.6 in)
- Height: 1988 Sedan: 1,326 mm (52.2 in); Liftback & Coupé: 1,260 mm (49.6 in); 1989–1992 Sedan: 1,331 mm (52.4 in); AWD Sedan: 1,346 mm (53.0 in); FWD Wagon: 1,384 mm (54.5 in); AWD Wagon: 1,415 mm (55.7 in)
- Curb weight: 880–1,200 kg (1,940–2,646 lb)

Chronology
- Predecessor: Corolla E80 (except wagon/van); Corolla E70 (wagon/van)
- Successor: Corolla E100

The Corolla E90 was the sixth generation of cars sold by Toyota under the Corolla nameplate, introduced in 1987 for the 1988 model year. It was the last generation of Corolla to be classified as a subcompact car and the first to be exclusively front-wheel drive or all-wheel drive; the performance option of rear-wheel drive was dropped.

For general export, the trim levels were Base, XL, GL, SE, and SE Limited. The FX-GT (only available in Japan) and GT-i (export version of the FX-GT, known as the SX Seca and/or Hatch in Australia) was a high-performance model powered by the 4A-GE engine; it was offered with hatchback and also five-door liftback bodywork in some markets. The North American GT-S coupé shared the same engine. The all-wheel drive Sprinter Carib wagon used a beam axle rear suspension with coil springs, while the rest used struts all around. In South Africa, the E90 was manufactured and marketed by Toyota under the Carri, Conquest, and Tazz model names. In a pair of similar joint ventures with General Motors, E90 variants with minor cosmetic changes were locally manufactured and sold as the Geo Prizm and Holden Nova in the United States and Australia respectively.

The majority of the Corolla range was replaced in June 1991 for the Japanese market, but production for export markets continued into 1992, and Australian Holden production extended until mid 1994. The all-wheel drive wagon was sold from 1988 to 1994 and had different bodywork to other Corollas; it replaced the Tercel 4WD Wagon/Sprinter Carib in Toyota's lineup. It retained the Sprinter Carib name in Japan, but was marketed as the Corolla Touring in Europe and some other countries, and as the Corolla All-Trac in the United States.

== Japan ==
The 1.3-litre sedan has a four-speed manual transmission (later all 1.3-litre engines had five-speeds) or a three-speed automatic transmission. The Full-Time All-Trac 4WD sedan is powered by the 1.6-litre 4A-F and first went on sale in October 1987. The manual transmission version has a manually locking centre differential, whereas the automatic versions have a hydraulically operated limited slip unit ("Hymatic"). The 1456 cc 3E engine was only fitted to the Japanese market Van (wagon) commercial version. The only sedan with the high output 1.5-litre 5A-FHE engine was the SE-Limited G; the FX (hatchback) received this engine in the FX-VS and FX-ZS models.

The FX hatchback was oriented at sportier drivers in Japan and was only available with the 1.5-litre 5A engine and with the powerful 4A-GE engine. Only a limited number of these were sold with the five-door bodywork. The Sprinter sedan has a third window in the C-pillar and was unique to Toyota Vista Store Japanese dealerships. The five-door liftback was only available to the Sprinter in Japan, although Europe and some other export markets received this body style with Corolla badging.

The AE92 Levin and Trueno were also fitted with a supercharged engine. It used an SC12 roots type supercharger and a top mounted intercooler that was fed cool air via a scoop on the bonnet. They generated 206 N⋅m (152 lb⋅ft) at 4400 rpm as opposed to the naturally aspirated 4A-GE's 136 N⋅m (100 lb⋅ft) at 4,800 rpm. In May 1989, the 90-series Corolla received a light facelift, including larger bumpers and a shift to fuel injected engines for all models aside from the 1.3. Also new was a four-wheel-drive diesel sedan using the 2-litre 2C engine.

Japanese market chassis:

- EE90 — Sedan 4-door (DX Custom, TX), Hatchback (XL, STD) 1.3 litre 2E.
- AE91 — Sedan 4-door (DX, TX, SE, SE Limited G), Hatchback (FX-L, FX-V, FX-G, FX-VS, FX-ZS) 1.5 litre 5A
- AE92 — 2 door coupé (Levin, Trueno), Sedan 4-door (SE Limited, GT), Hatchback (FX, FX16, FX-GTV, FX-GT), Liftback (Sprinter GT) 1.6 litre 4A
- AE95 — 4WD sedan 4-door (TX, XE, SE, SE Limited) 1.6 litre 4A
- CE90 — FWD Sedan 4-door 1.8 litre diesel 1C
- CE95 — 4WD Sedan 4-door 2.0 litre diesel 2C
- AE91G — FWD wagon 5-door 1.5 litre 5A
- AE95G — 4WD wagon 5-door (Carib) 4A
- EE97G — FWD wagon 5-door 1.3 litre 2E
- CE97G — FWD wagon 5-door 1.8 litre diesel 1C
- CE96V — FWD van 5-door 1.8 litre diesel 1C
- EE96V — FWD van 5-door (Std, XL) 1.3 litre 2E
- EE98V — FWD van 5-door 1.45 litre 3E

Japanese market engines:

- 2E — 1.3 litre 12-valve — 73 PS (54 kW)
- 3E — 1.45 litre 12-valve — 79 PS (58 kW)
- 5A-F — 1.5 litre 16-valve DOHC — 85 PS (63 kW)
- 5A-FE — 1.5 litre 16-valve DOHC, EFI — 94 PS (69 kW)
- 5A-FHE — 1.5 litre 16-valve DOHC, EFI — 105 PS (77 kW)
- 4A-FE — 1.6 litre 16-valve DOHC, EFI — narrow valve angle, 100 PS (74 kW)
- 4A-GE — 1.6 litre 16-valve DOHC, EFI — wide valve angle, 120 PS (88 kW), 140 PS (103 kW) after facelift
- 4A-GZE — 1.6 L (1587 cc) I4, 16-valve DOHC, EFI, wide valve angle, supercharger, 145 PS (107 kW) — 165 PS (121 kW) after 1989 facelift, fitted to the "GT-Z" version.
- 1C-II — 1.8 litre diesel — 64 PS (47 kW)
- 1C-III — 1.8 litre diesel — 67 PS (49 kW)
- 2C-III — 2.0 litre diesel — 73 PS (54 kW)
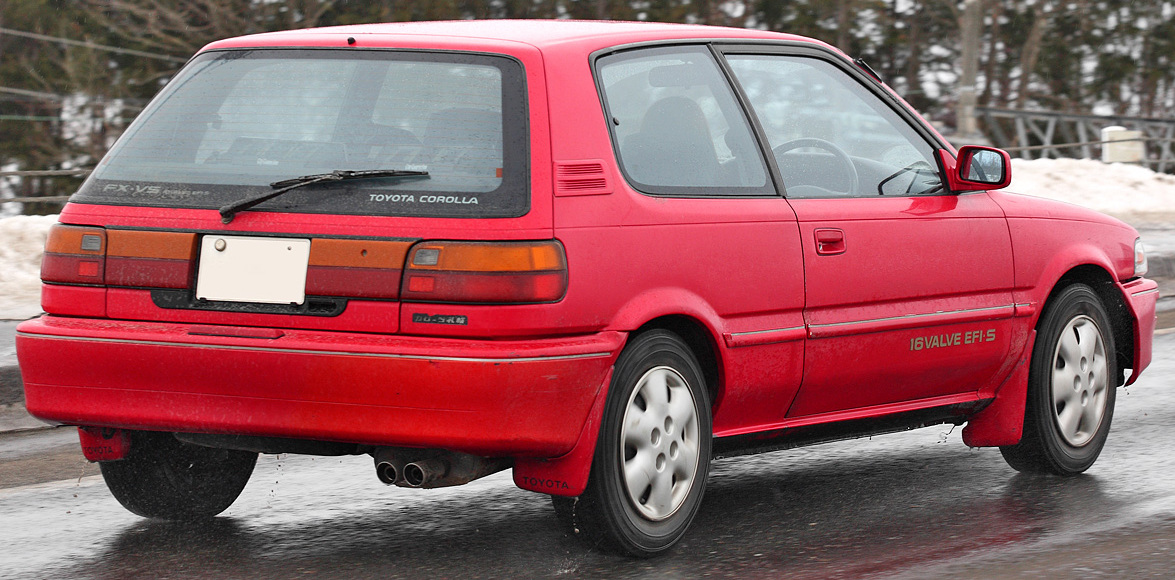
Corolla 1.5 FX-VS (AE91, Japan)

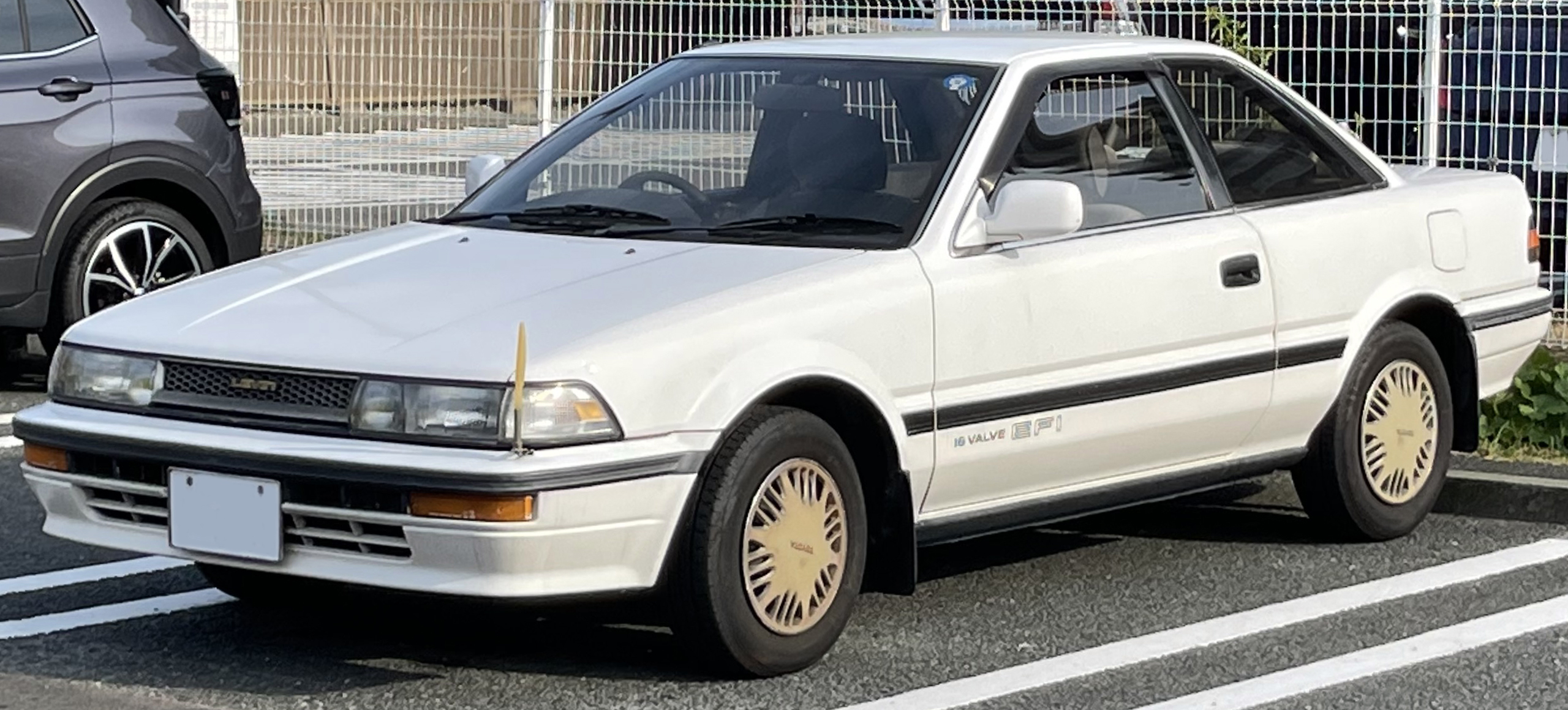
Corolla Levin Zi (AE91, Japan)

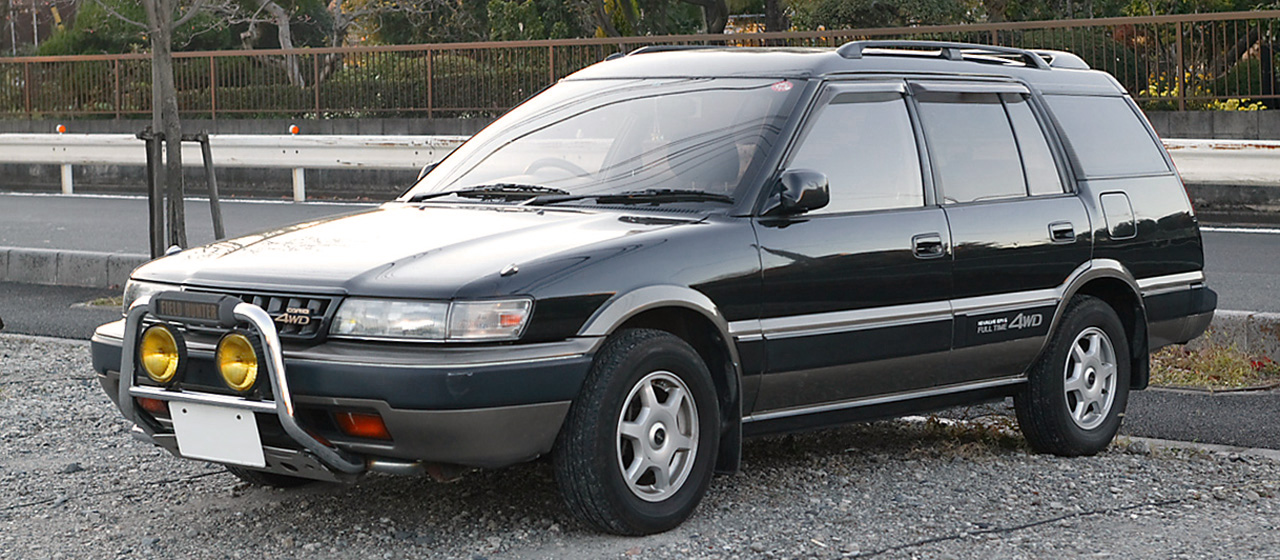
Sprinter Carib (AE95G, Japan)

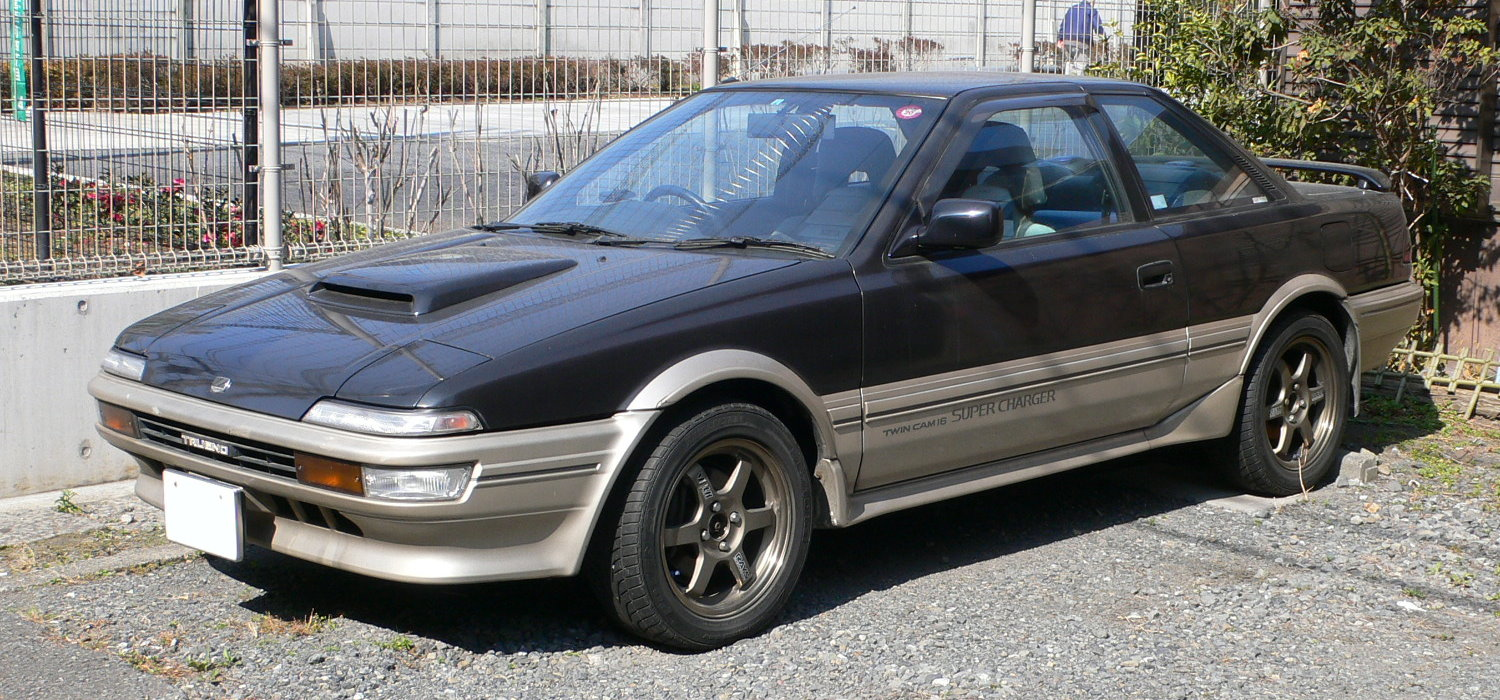
Sprinter Trueno GT-Z Super Charger (AE92, Japan)

== Asia ==
Asian market Corollas originally came with four-door sedan (1.3-litre and 1.6-litre) or five-door liftback bodywork (1.6). The engines were the 12 valve 2E with 72 PS (53 kW) or the Twin Cam 16-valve 4A-F with 94 PS (69 kW). All engines were carbureted and without catalysts. There is also a GT variant which features disc brakes on all wheels, additional gauges (volt meter & oil pressure gauge), performance suspension and a more powerful 1.6-litre 4A-GE engine with 142 PS (104 kW).

=== Philippines ===
In the Philippines, nicknamed as the "Small Body", the sixth generation Corolla was initially introduced in March 1989 with 3 trim levels: XL, XE and GL. Both the XL and XE variants came with the 1.3 litre SOHC 12-valve 2E engine, while the GL variant, which is the top-of-the-line model, came with the more powerful 1.6 litre DOHC 16-valve 4A-F engine. The GL trim was also equipped with a rear anti-roll bar, which was absent on the XL and XE variants. XL variants were given 4-speed manual transmissions, while the XE and GL models came with 5-speed manual transmissions.

- XL – 1.3 litre SOHC 2E engine, 4-Speed manual transmission, no power steering and stereo, 13-inch steel rims.
- XE – 1.3 litre SOHC 2E engine, 5-Speed manual transmission, includes tachometer, power steering and stereo, 13-inch alloy rims.
- GL – 1.6 litre DOHC 4A-F engine, 5-Speed manual transmission, rear suspension stabilizer bar, includes tachometer, power steering and stereo, power windows and door locks, 60/40 fold-down seats, 13-inch alloy rims.

=== Indonesia ===
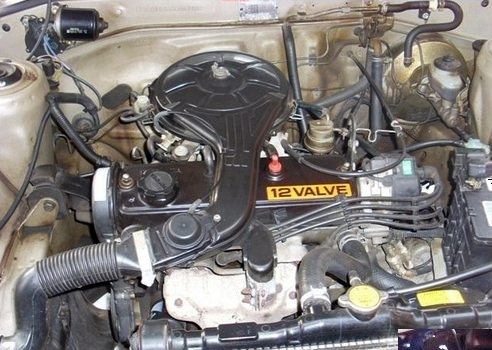
The 2E engine in an E90-series Corolla

In Indonesia, this generation was assembled locally from 1988 to 1992 and marketed as the "Corolla Twincam", available as a 4-door sedan and 5-door liftback.

The sedan was available in 3 trim levels:

- SE: carbureted 1.3-litre SOHC 2E engine, without power window and power steering. 5-speed manual transmission only.
- SE Limited: carbureted 1.6-litre DOHC 4A-F engine, equipped with power steering, power window and central door lock. 5-speed manual transmission only.
- GTi: fuel injected 1.6-litre DOHC 4A-GE engine, similar to SE Limited but with rear disc brakes, different dashboard and strut bar. Transmission was 5-speed manual.

The liftback version was only available with the carbureted 1.6-litre DOHC 4A-F engine with equipment similar to the SE Limited sedan. Transmission was 5-speed manual.

=== Thailand ===
In Thailand, this generation of corolla was nicknamed as the "Doraemon", due to its similar appearance with that said cartoon character. The sixth generation Corolla was introduced in June 1988 with 4 trim levels: XL, GL, SE, SE Limited and Sporty. The latter was replaced by GTi trim in April 1989. Both the XL and GL variants came with the 1.3 litre SOHC 12-valve 2E engine, the SE and SE Limited variants came with the 1.6 litre DOHC 16-valve 4A-F engine, while the GTi variant, which is the top-of-the-line model, came with the more powerful and fuel injected 1.6 litre DOHC 16-valve 4A-GE engine. XL, GL, SE and GTi variants were given 5-speed manual transmissions, while the SE Limited model came with 4-speed automatic transmission.

- XL – 1.3 litre SOHC 2E engine, 5-Speed manual transmission, no power windows, power steering and stereo, 13-inch steel rims.
- GL – 1.3 litre SOHC 2E engine, 5-Speed manual transmission, includes stereo, tilt steering adjustment, no power windows and power steering, 13-inch steel rims with hubcaps.
- SE Limited – 1.6 litre DOHC 4A-F engine, 5-Speed manual transmission, includes tachometer, stereo, tilt steering adjustment, power windows and door locks, no power steering, 13-inch steel rims with hubcaps, rear suspension stabilizer bar
- SE Limited Automatic – 1.6 litre DOHC 4A-F engine, 4-Speed automatic transmission, includes tachometer, stereo, tilt steering adjustment, power windows, power steering, door locks and mirrors, 13-inch steel rims with hubcaps, rear suspension stabilizer bar
- Sporty – 1.6 litre DOHC 4A-F engine with twin Weber carburettors, producing 106 PS (78 kW), based on SE Limited trim, TRD steering wheel, fiberglass body kits, front fog lights, rear upper spoiler, dual muffler exhaust, 14-inch steel rims with hubcaps and front sport seat.
- GTi – 1.6 litre DOHC 4A-GE engine, 5-Speed manual transmission, includes tachometer, stereo, tilt steering adjustment, variable type steering wheel without power steering, power windows, door locks and mirrors, 14-inch alloy rims, variable type windshield wipers, rear suspension stabilizer bar

=== Pakistan ===
In Pakistan, the E90 Corolla was imported as a Completely Built Unit (CBU) from 1988 to May 1993, when the Indus Motor Company formally began assembling the 7th generation Toyota Corolla (E100) in the country. The majority of cars arrived with the 1.3 litre 2E engine in DX or GL variants.

Just like all Corolla models, the E90 was a popular family car in Pakistan and has a cult following among older Pakistanis due to its durability, reliability and driving comfort. The E90 Corolla again gained popularity in Pakistan when reconditioned cars from mostly Japan were imported into the country in the later years of 1990s. A lot of E90 Corollas either arrived in the country with original diesel engines - the 1839 cc 1C-II/III or the 1973 cc 2C-III inline-fours - or were converted to diesel engines in Pakistan. Diesel was a cheap alternative fuel to petrol at the time and the 1C and 2C engines' strong fuel economy made the E90 Diesel Corolla a sought after vehicle in the market.

== Australia ==
In December 1988, Toyota formed a joint venture with Holden called UAAI to build and market the Toyota Corolla as the Holden Nova. This agreement paralleled two Corolla generations including both the E90 and E100 series.

Australian market engines:

- 4A-F — 1.6 L (1587 cc) I4, 16-valve DOHC, carb, 71 kW (95 hp) CS, CS Limited, CSX & Spirit
- 4A-FE — 1.6 L (1587 cc) I4, 16-valve DOHC, FI, narrow valve angle, 76 kW (102 hp) XL, SR5, CSi, CSi Limited, Olympic Spirit
- 4A-GE — 1.6 L (1587 cc) I4, 16-valve DOHC, FI, wide valve angle, 101 kW (135 hp) SX, & GTi
- 6A-FC — 1.4 L (1397 cc) I4, 16-valve DOHC, carb, narrow valve angle, 60 kW (81 hp) SE
- 7A-FE — 1.8 L (1762 cc) I4, 16-valve DOHC, FI, narrow valve angle, 86 kW (115 hp) Seca RV & Seca Ultima

Australian market chassis:

- AE90 — Sedan, Hatchback (SE)
- AE92 — Sedan, Hatchback, Seca (CS, CSX, Spirit, SE, SX)
- AE93 — Hatchback, Seca (SX, GTi)
- AE94 — Sedan, Hatchback, Seca (CSi, CSi Limited, Ultima)
- AE95 — Wagon (XL, SR5, CSi, Olympic Spirit)
- AE96 — Seca (RV, Ultima)

Note:

- The Corolla liftback was called Seca in Australia
- The Corolla 4x4 wagon (Sprinter Carib Wagon elsewhere) was released in mid-1988, Hatchback, Seca & Sedan released mid-1989
- SX hatch is generally AE93 although on rare occasions they are found to be AE92R
- The facelift series 2 models were released in October 1991
- 6A-FC was only found in SE hatchbacks and early SE Sedans
- Corollas with 7A-FE engine were AE94 Ultimas in early 1992 and AE96 Ultimas & RV's in late 92 onwards
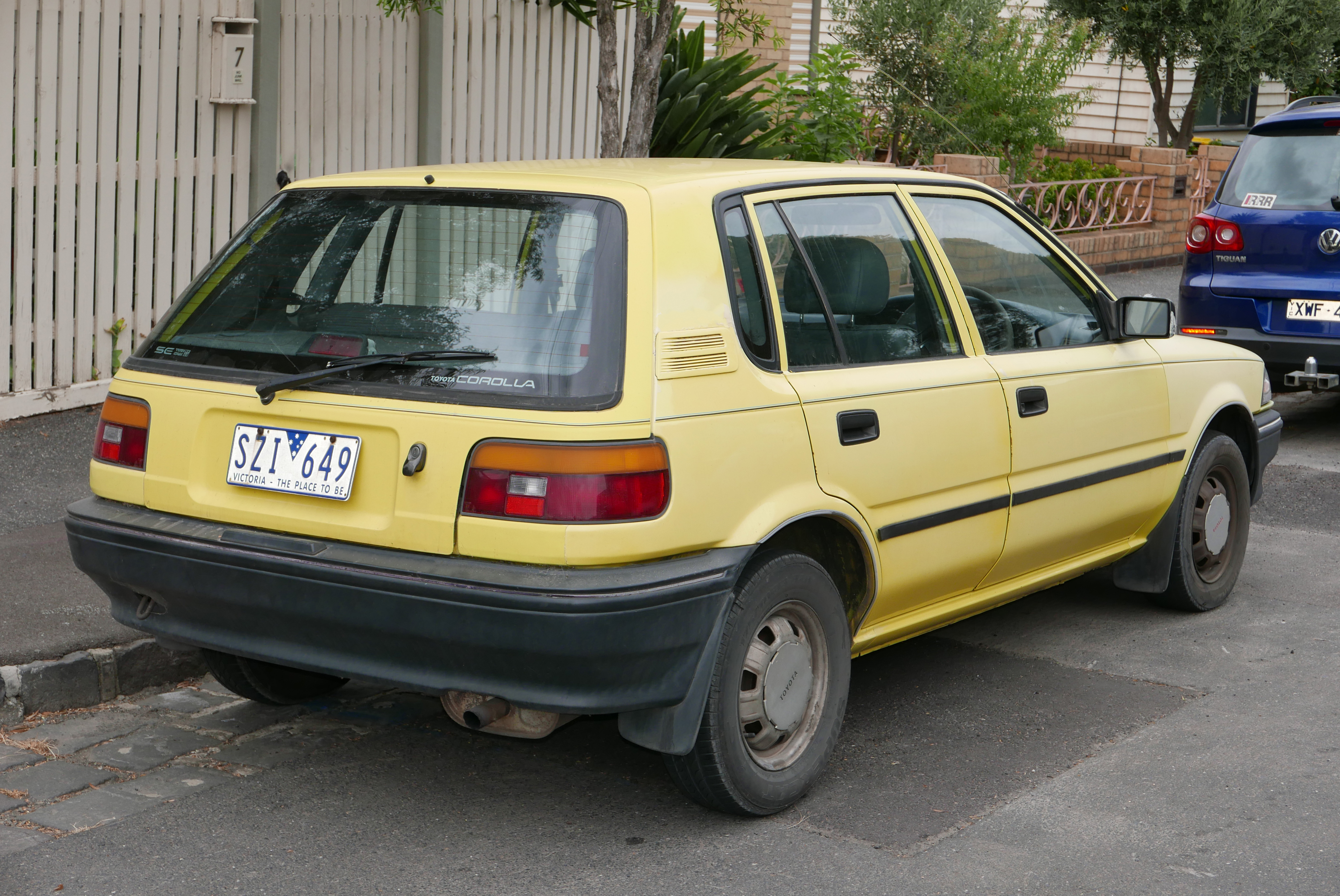
Pre-facelift Corolla SE 5-door (Australia)

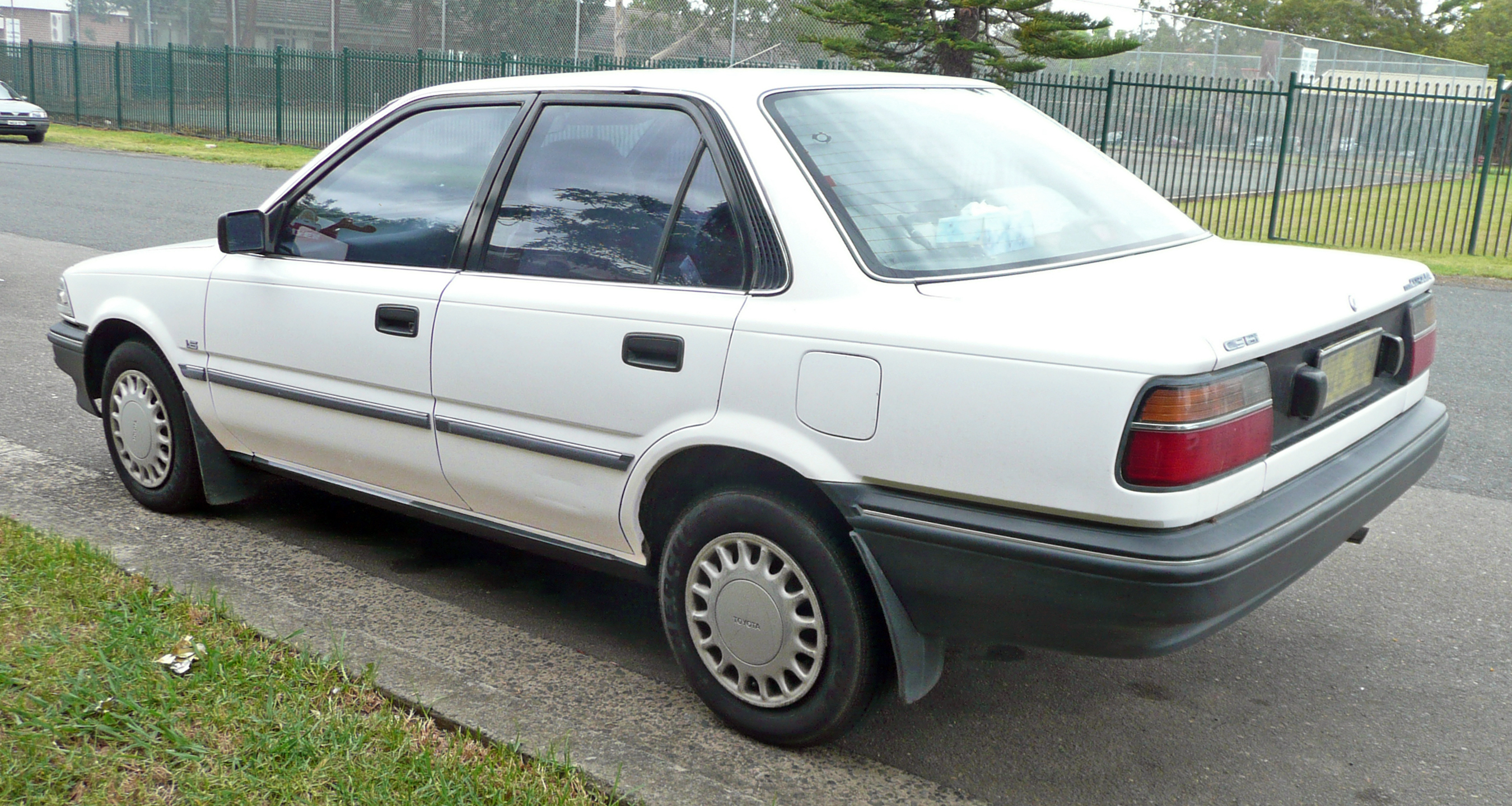
Pre-facelift Corolla CS sedan (Australia)

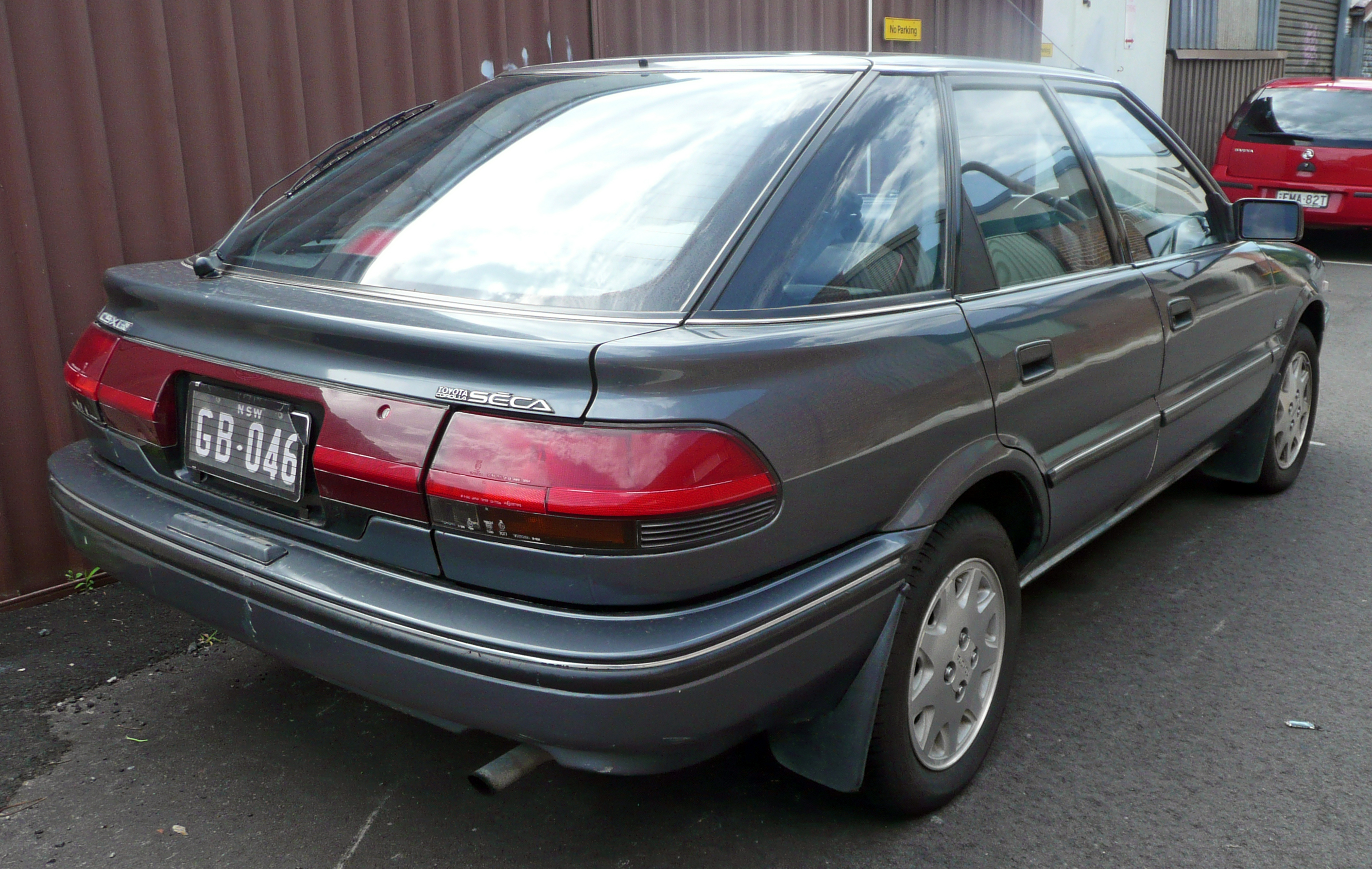
Pre-facelift Corolla CS-X Seca liftback (Australia)

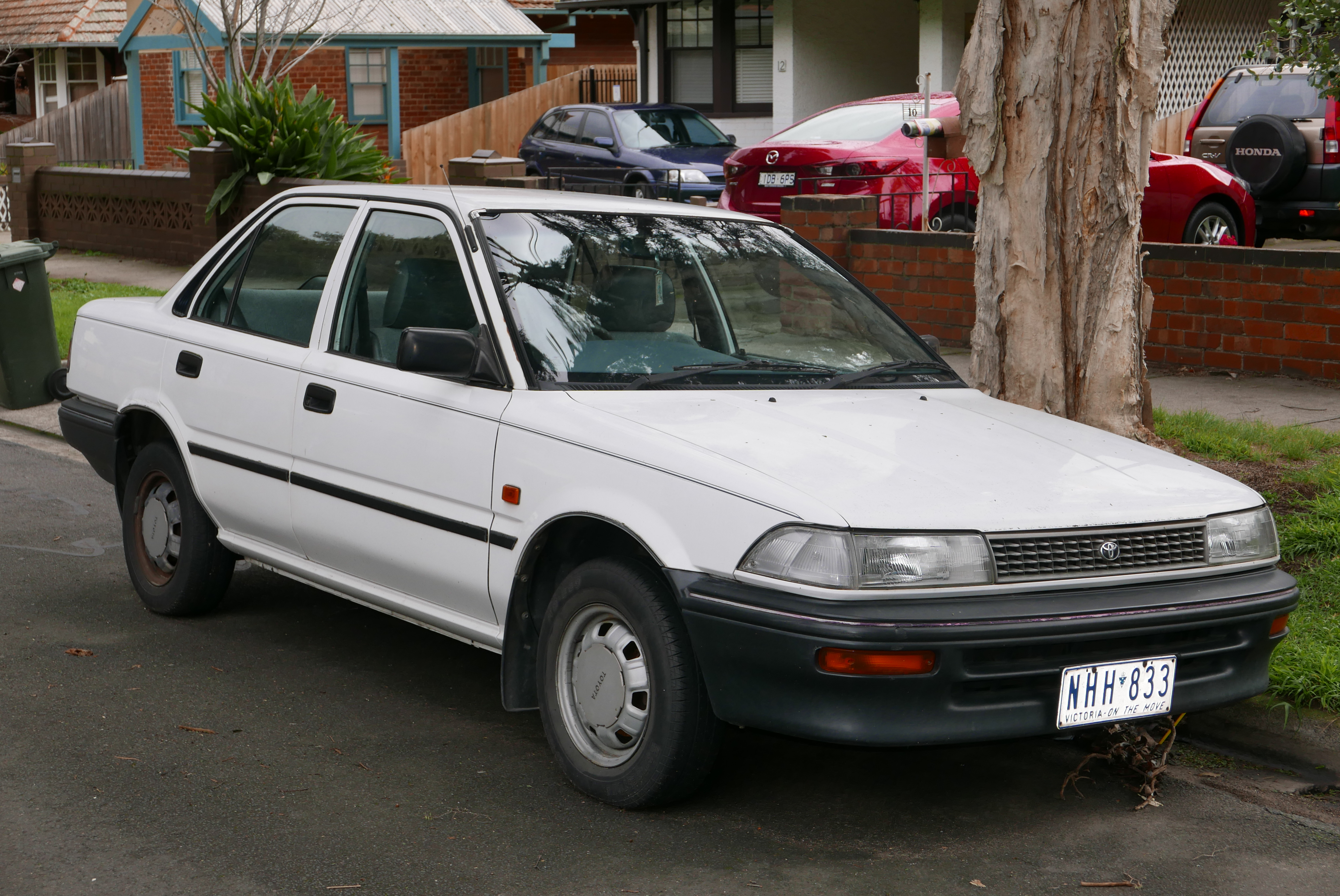
Facelift Corolla SE sedan (Australia)

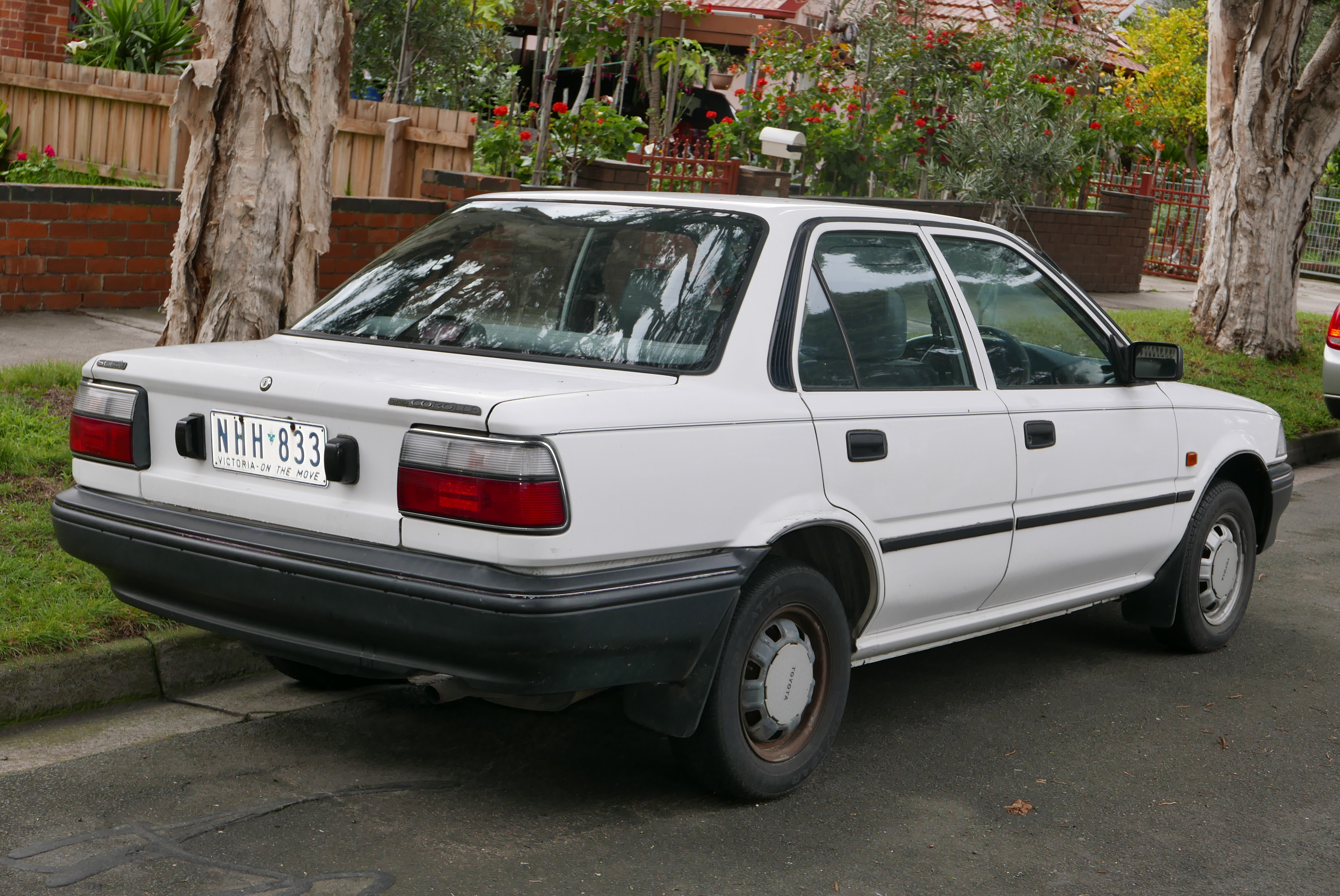
Facelift Corolla SE sedan (Australia)

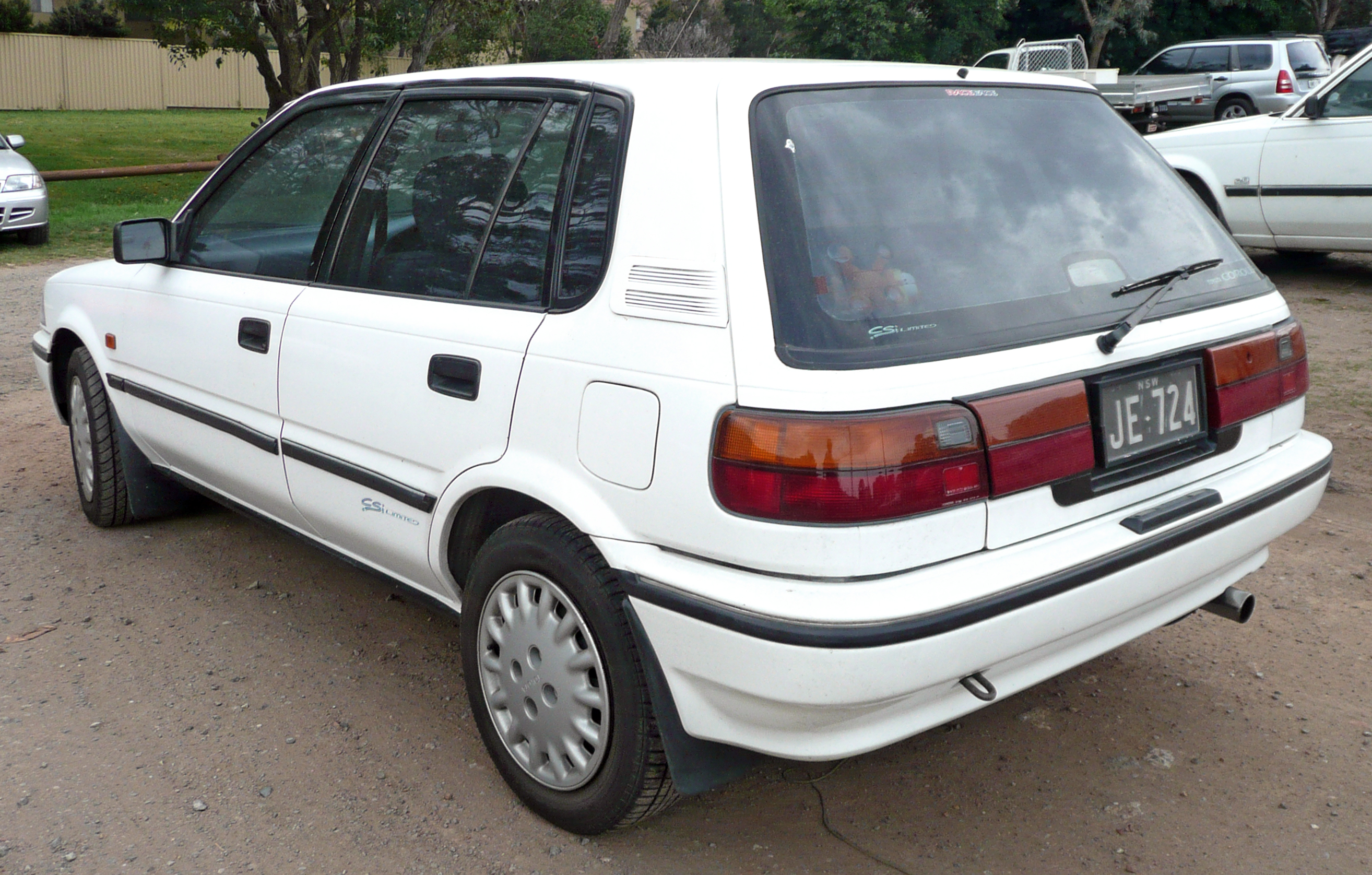
Facelift Corolla CSi Limited 5-door (Australia)

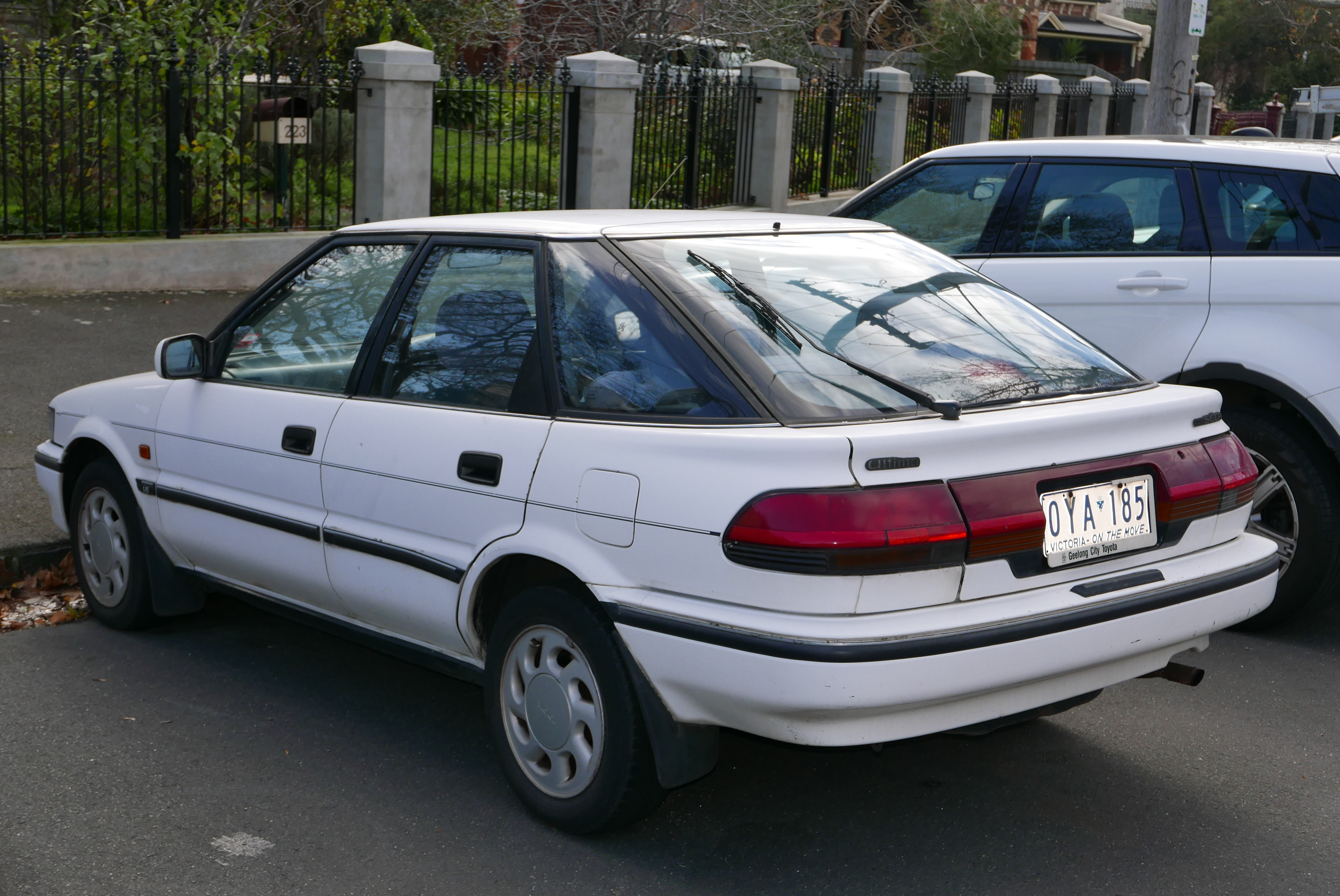
Facelift Corolla Ultima Seca liftback (Australia)

== Europe ==
The European model Corolla featured either a four-door sedan and a three- or five-door hatchback, and the regular wagon basically has the front end of the Japan-spec Corolla FX, except for the all white clearance lights and the "TOYOTA" or the ellipse emblem instead of the "FX" or "GT" of the Japanese models. It has the standard side marker lights and the tail light with the integrated rear fog lamp (except for the wagon, which has the rear fog lamp on the tailgate.) European market Corollas also have headlight washers on the XL and the XLi models. The five-door liftback used the Japanese market Sprinter Cielo body in its entirety, although in Europe it was available with the little 1.3 litre engine as well. From August 1989 there was also a fuel-injected and catalyzed version of the 1.3-litre engine available to some European markets. Power outputs were increased across the range at this time, part of a light mid-life makeover. A fuel injected version of the narrow-angle 1.6-litre engine was also added mid-life, only available with a catalytic converter and offering 15 horsepower more than the earlier, carburetted version. The second generation Sprinter Carib was also sold as a Corolla in Europe, where it replaced the Tercel Wagon. This little four-wheel drive station wagon received the "Touring" suffix in most European markets.

The hatchback, representing the most popular and most closely contested market segment in Europe, suffered from being somewhat of a design afterthought since sedans have always been the mainstay of the Corolla lineup in the home market. As opposed to its European competitors, where hatchbacks received a tacked-on trunk to become sedans (the Ford Orion, the Volkswagen Jetta, or the Opel Kadett sedan/Vauxhall Belmont), Toyota started with the sedan and derived the hatchback from it. As a result, the design was a bit truncated and trunk space was minimal at 281 L (9.9 cu ft). This was only a fraction more than the much smaller Citroën AX, and considerably less than for competitors such as the Kadett and Fiat Tipo (390 and 345 L; 13.8 and 12.2 cu ft).

The diesel version saw substantial sales in countries such as Belgium and Netherlands, where the tax structure favored diesels but where there were also no laws hindering the sales of Japanese cars. In Europe it was only sold with the comparatively spartan XL equipment level. The diesel, while quite slow and with heavy steering, was competitive with similar European cars of the period. The power of the diesel increased by three horseower in the late summer of 1989.

From late 1989 the 4A-GE engine in the GTi model was changed from the T-VIS equipped 'big port' variant to the non-T-VIS 'small port' version. For UK specification cars (without catalytic converters), this increased power from 124 to 129 bhp (92 to 96 kW). The GTi was available as a hatchback or a liftback, although not all markets received both bodystyles. The catalyzed version, which gradually became the default option across Western Europe, produces 116 PS (85 kW; 114 hp) at 6,600 rpm. In Sweden, the 4A-GE equipped liftback was marketed as the Corolla CS (Coupé Sport), beginning in May 1991. It had the new 125 PS (92 kW) version of the 4A-GE engine and ventilated disc brakes all around.

European market engines:

Engine	Displacement		Layout	Power				Cat.	Notes
Engine	L	cc	Layout	kW	PS	hp	at rpm	Cat.	Notes
2E	1.3	1,296	carb 12V SOHC I4	55	75	74	6200	○	Oxi-cat version has identical power figures
2E	1.3	1,296	carb 12V SOHC I4	53	72	71	6000	●	
2E-E	1.3	1,296	EFI 12V SOHC I4	60	82	81	6000	●	
4A-F	1.6	1,587	carb 16V DOHC I4	70	95	94	6000	–	narrow valve angle
4A-F	1.6	1,587	carb 16V DOHC I4	66	90	89	6000	●	narrow valve angle
4A-FE	1.6	1,587	EFI 16V DOHC I4	77	105	104	5600	●	narrow valve angle
4A-GE	1.6	1,587	EFI 16V DOHC I4	92	125	123	6600	–	wide valve angle, T-VIS
4A-GE	1.6	1,587	EFI 16V DOHC I4	85	116	114	6600	●	wide valve angle, T-VIS
4A-GE	1.6	1,587	EFI 16V DOHC I4	96	131	129	7000	–	wide valve angle, no T-VIS
4A-GE	1.6	1,587	EFI 16V DOHC I4	92	125	123	7000	●	wide valve angle, no T-VIS
1C-L	1.8	1,839	diesel SOHC I4	47	64	63	4700	–	
1C-III	1.8	1,839	diesel SOHC I4	49	67	66	4600	–	

European market chassis:

- EE90 — 1.3 Hatchback 3-door (XL, GL), 1.3 Sedan 4-door (XL, GL), 1.3 Liftback 5-door, 1.3 Wagon 5-door (XL, GL, SR)
- AE92 — 1.6 Coupé 2-door (XL), 1.6 Sedan 4-door (GL, GLi, XLi), 1.6 Liftback 5-door (GLi, GTi, CS), 1.6 Hatchback 3-door (XL, GLi, Si, GSi, GTi), 1.6 Wagon 5-door
- AE95 — 1.6 Sedan 4-door 4WD, 1.6 Touring 4WD (Wagon)
- CE90 — 1.8 Diesel Hatchback 5-door (XL), Liftback 5-door (XL), Wagon 5-door (XL, GL)
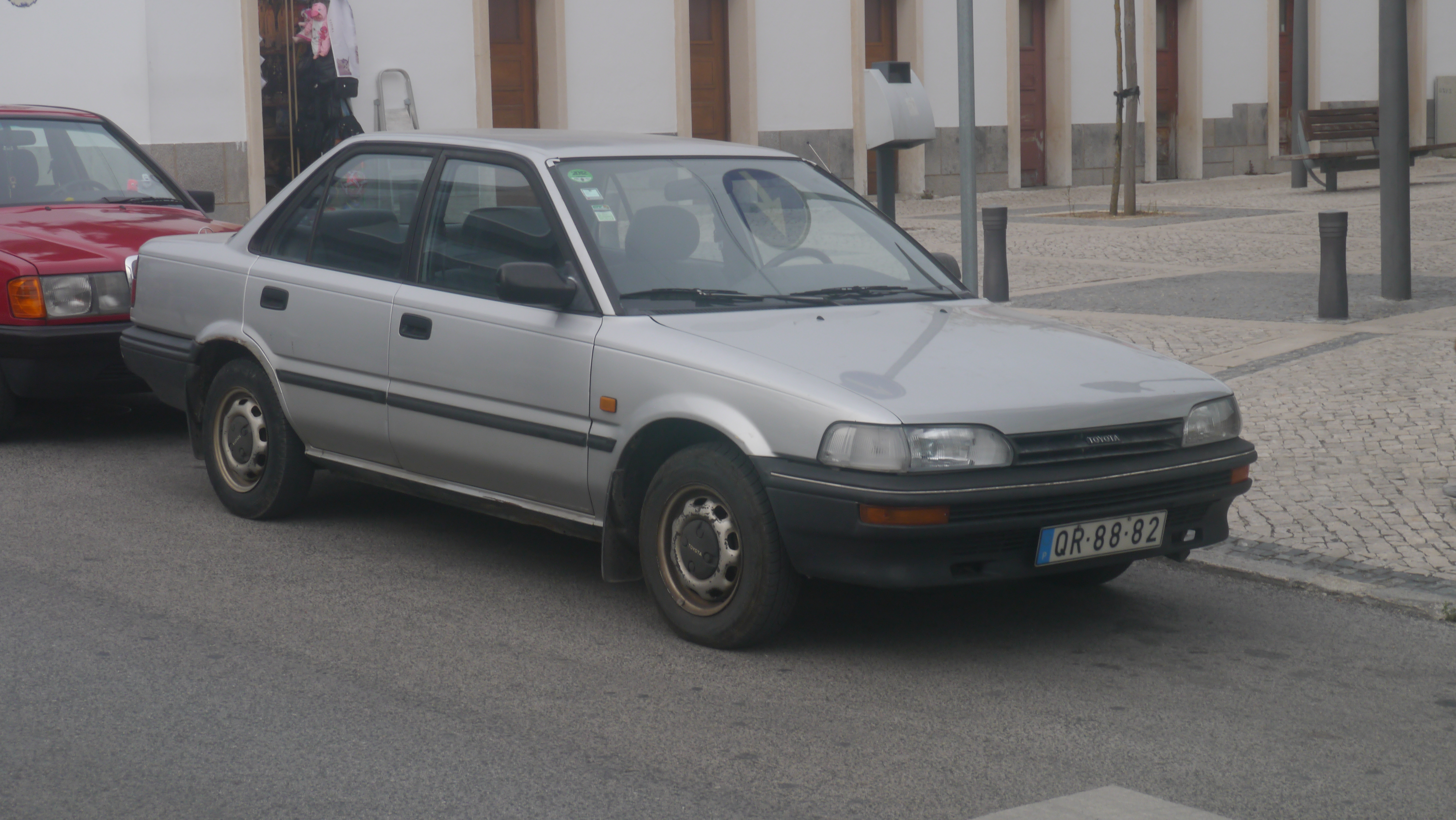
Corolla 1.3 XL sedan (Portugal)

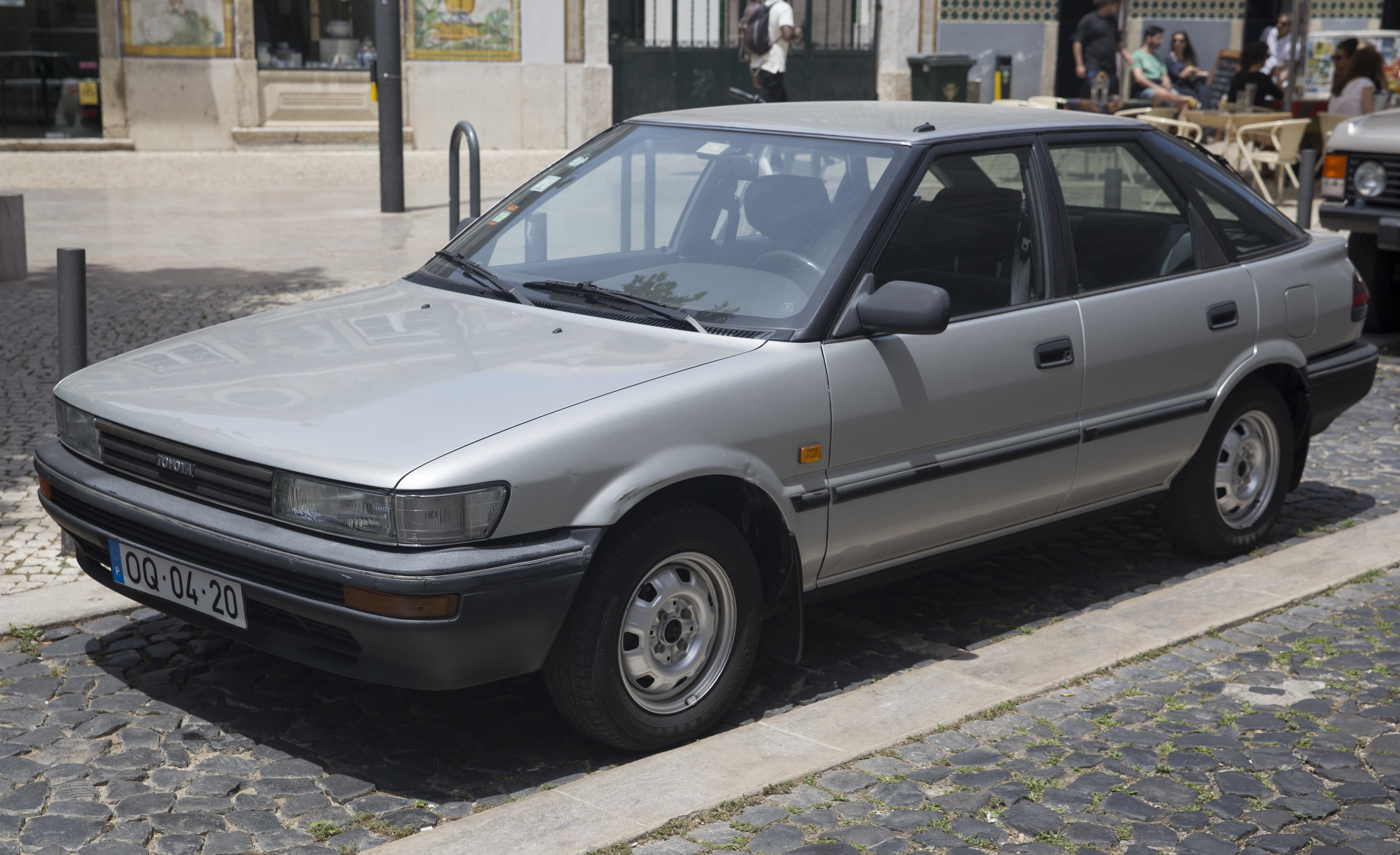
1988 Corolla 1.3 GL liftback (Portugal)

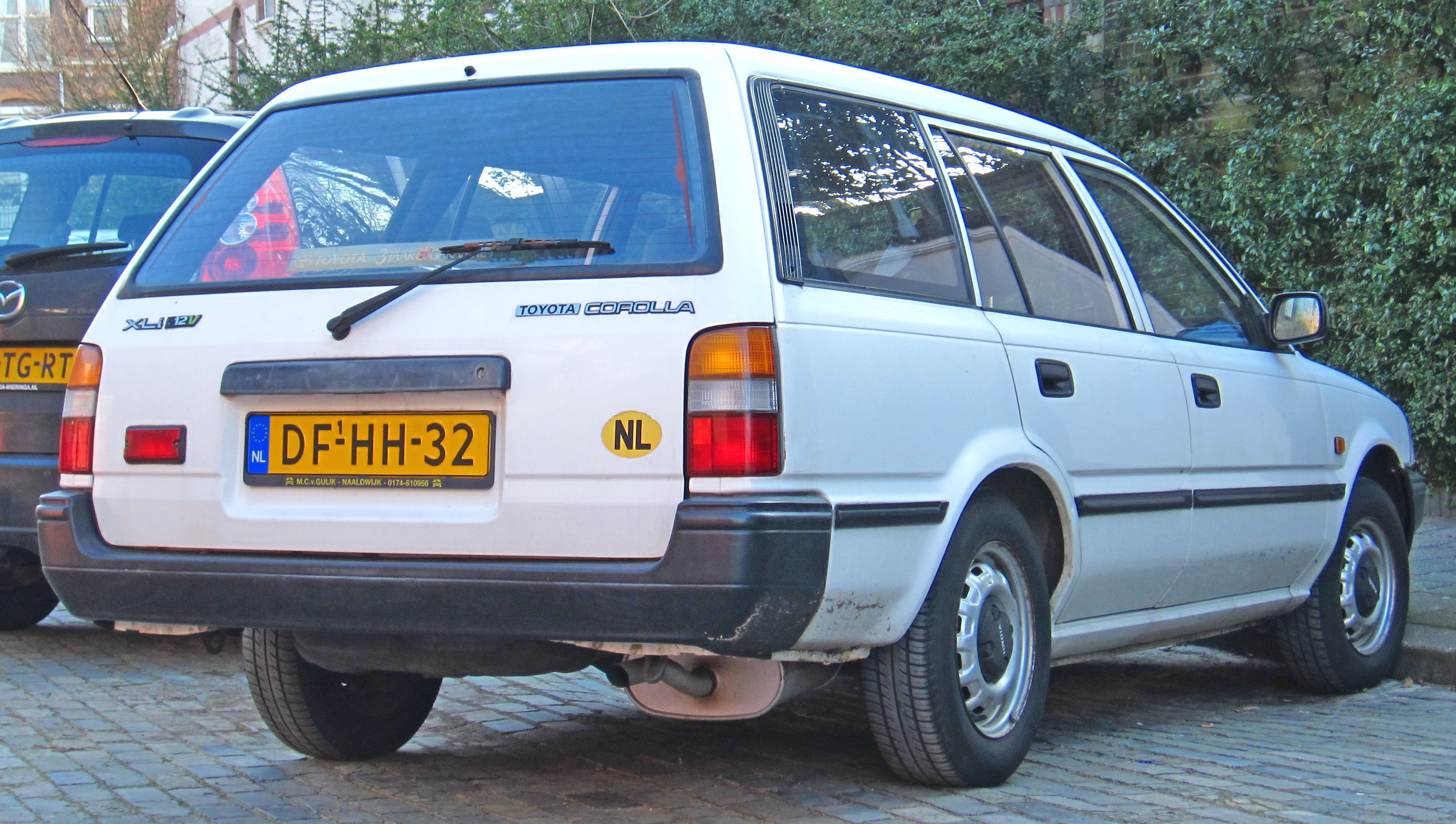
Corolla 1.3 XLi station wagon (Netherlands)

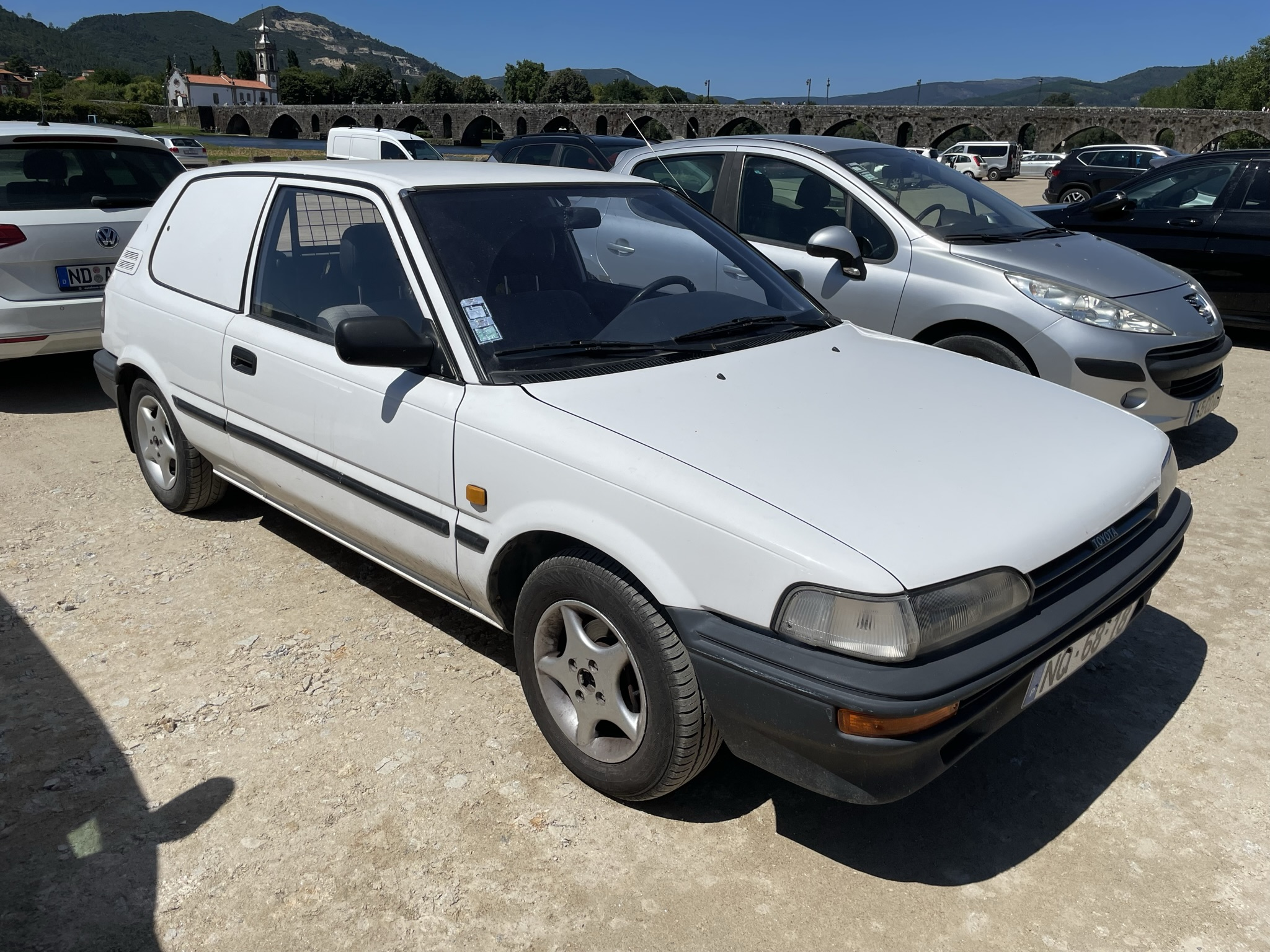
1990 Corolla three-door hatchback panel van (Portugal)

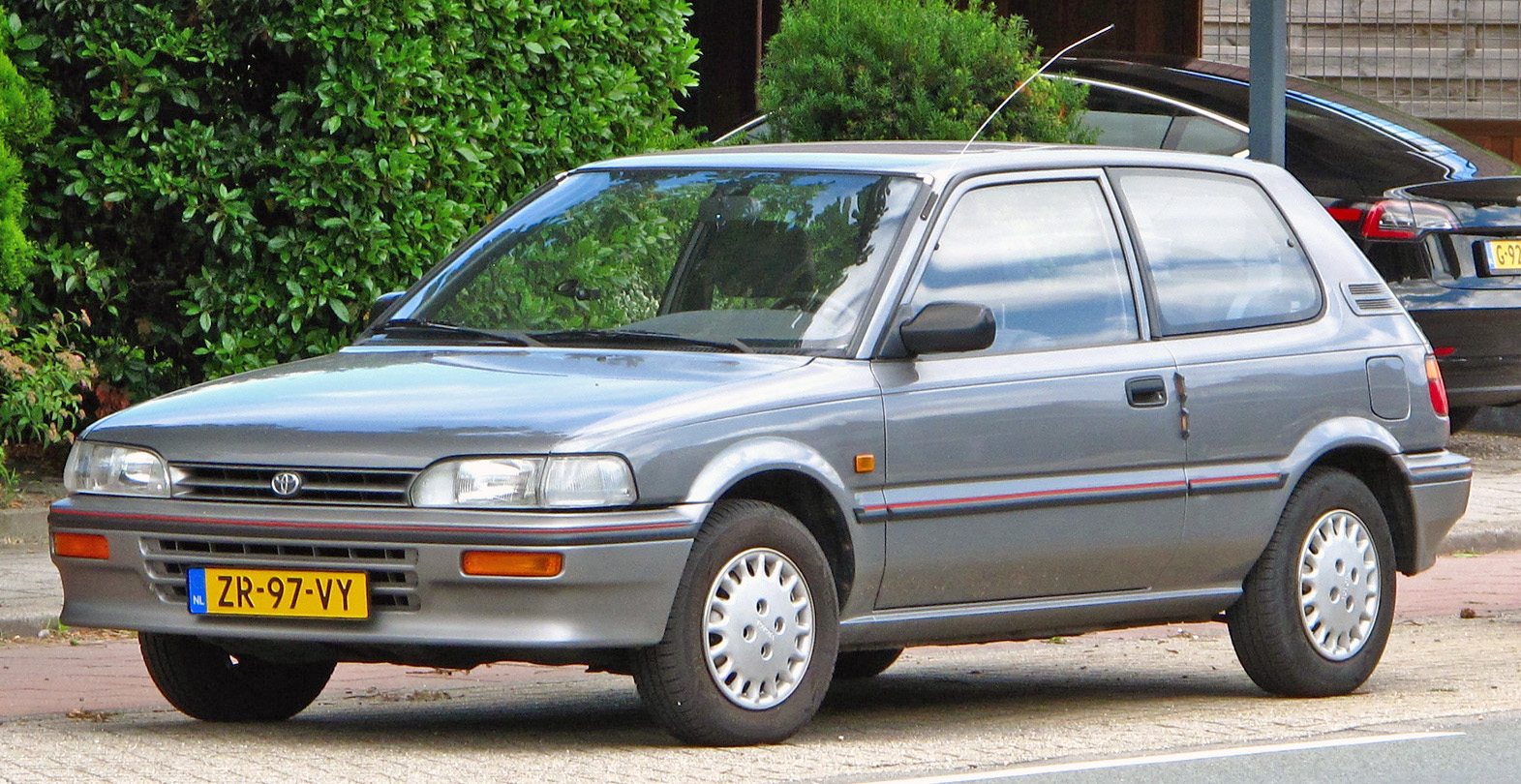
1991 Corolla 1.3 XLi three-door hatchback (Netherlands)

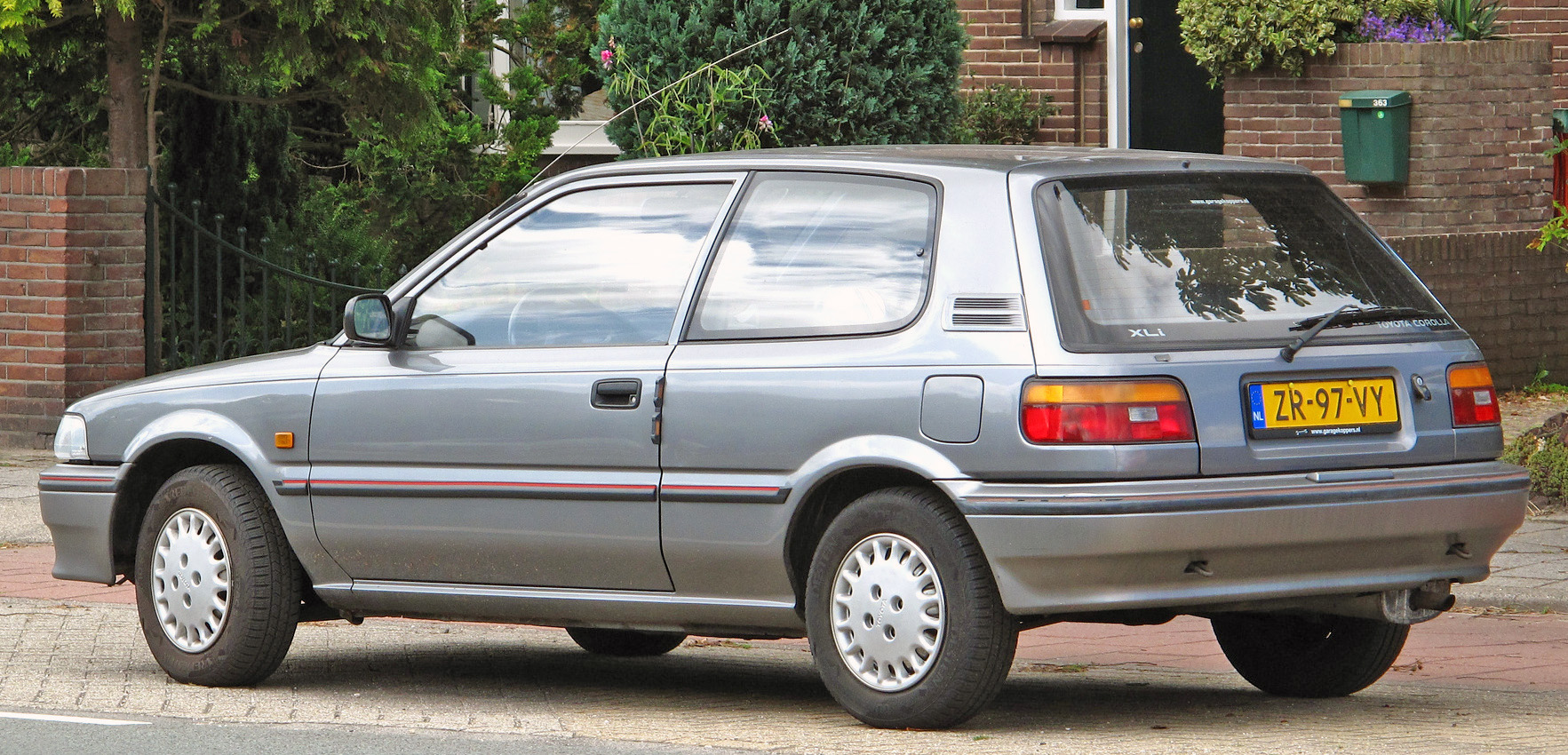
1991 Corolla 1.3 XLi three-door hatchback (Netherlands)

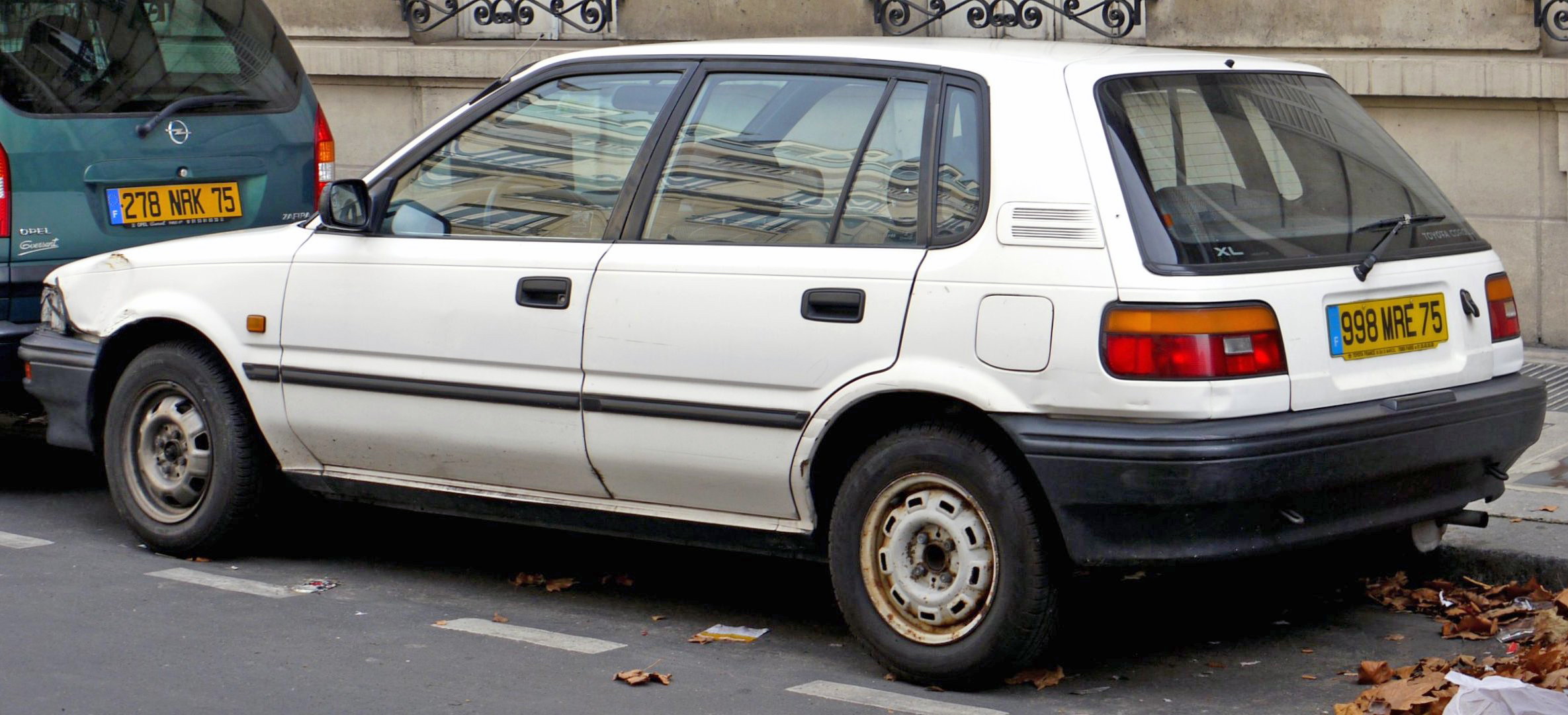
Corolla 1.3 XL five-door hatchback (France)

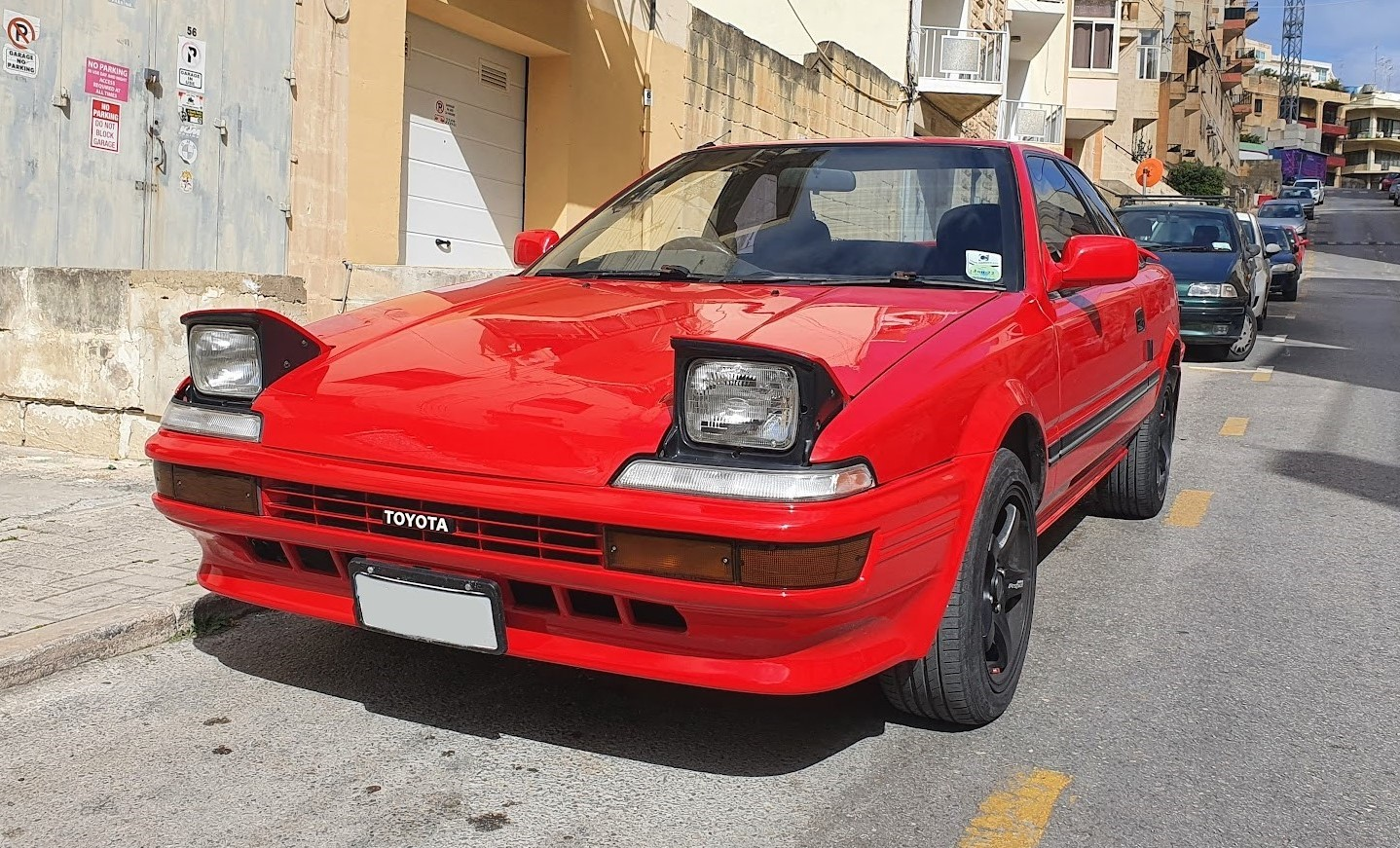
1991 Corolla (AE92) 1.6 XL Coupé 2-door SR5 (Malta)

== North America ==
The E90 went on sale in North America for the 1988 model year. North American production of the sedan took place at NUMMI and Cambridge, Ontario, Canada. These two plants made 279,000 units, making a total of 4.5 million of this generation (AE92) made. The NUMMI plant had been building the E80 Corolla FX (hatchback), but this never sold well in the United States and so Toyota switched to building the sedan with the new series. The North American models depart from the previous generation's boxy styling, for a more contemporary look and improved aerodynamics. They feature longer bumpers and small red conspicuity lights on the rear quarter panels. Cabin air exits through stylish vents behind the rear side windows.

A 25th anniversary special edition was produced in 1990, made to commemorate the 25th anniversary of the Corolla line. It included 25th anniversary emblems on the front fender, embroidered on the front seat, and a three-spoke steering wheel.

Minor changes for the 1991 model year include the modern Toyota emblem used corporately since 1989 on the grille, all-red taillights, door-mounted and manual lap front seat belts, and new hubcaps for the DX. The rear garnish was deleted for the base model.

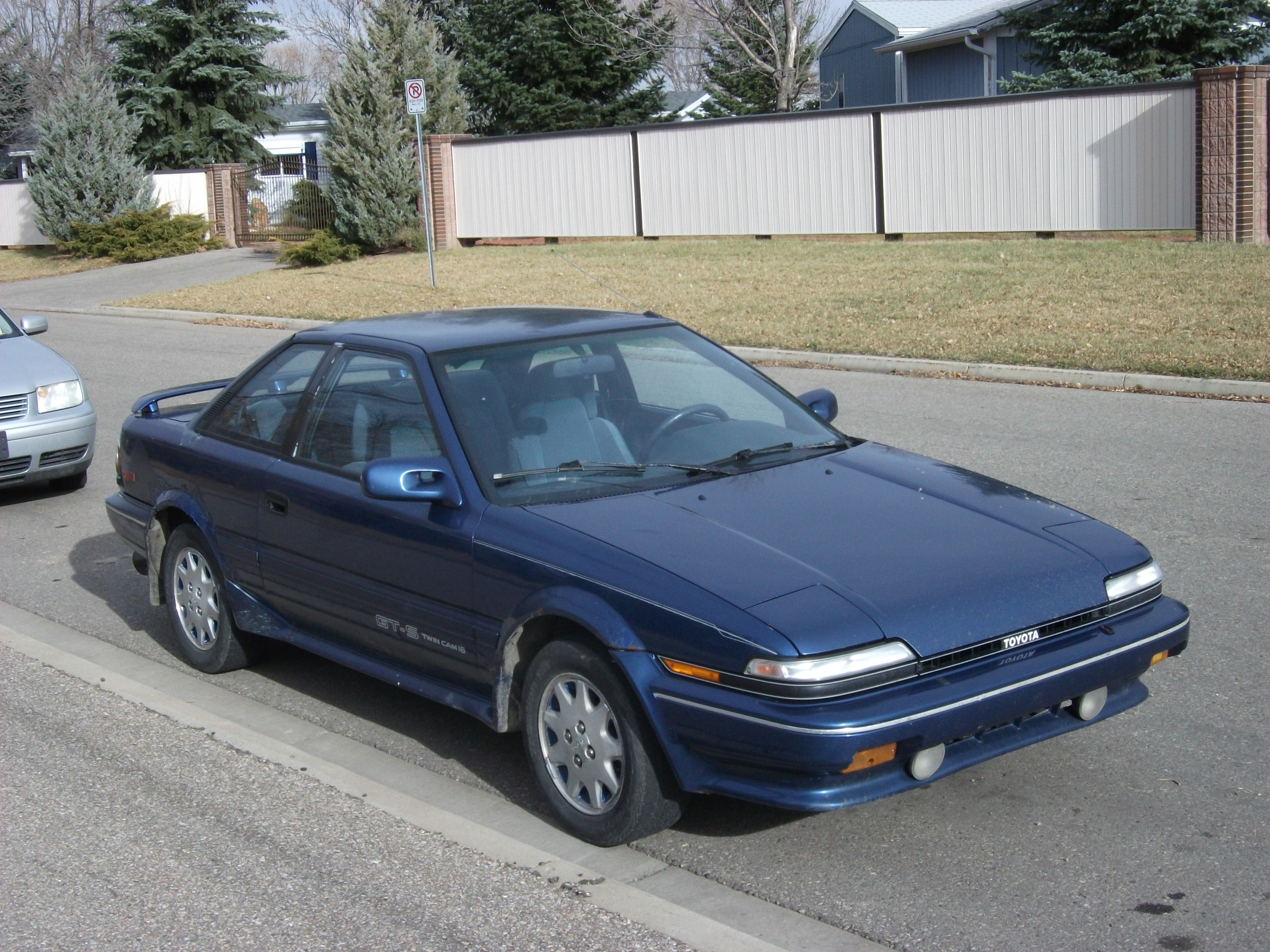
Toyota Corolla Sport GT-S AE92

The North American Corolla Sport coupé with retractable headlights was basically a Sprinter Trueno with different front corner lights and longer bumpers. Trim levels are SR5 and GT-S. The GT-S is powered by 4A-GE engine and comes with full body kits. In 1990 the 4A-GE received a revised cylinder head and intake manifold. The new motor featured higher compression, the removal of the T-VIS system, and smaller ports in the intake manifold and is thus commonly referred to as the "smallport" version. Horsepower jumped from 86 kW (115 hp) to 88 kW (118 hp) and 101 kW (135 hp).

The four-wheel drive All-Trac wagon in Base and SR5 trim levels were sold from 1988 to 1992 and had different bodywork to other Corollas. The Corolla 4WD sedan was produced in very small numbers, shared the same body as the AE92 sedan, with the only visible difference being the tire size.

The Geo Prizm shared a slightly different body with the Japan-market Sprinter sedan and Cielo liftback. These models were slightly more basic than their European/Japanese versions. The GSi version was equipped with the 4A-GE.

North American market engines:

- 4A-F — 1.6 L (1587 cc) I4, 16-valve DOHC, carb, narrow valve angle, 71 kW (95 hp)
- 4A-FE — 1.6 L (1587 cc) I4, 16-valve DOHC, FI, narrow valve angle, 76 kW (102 hp)
- 4A-GE — 1.6 L (1587 cc) I4, 16-valve DOHC, FI, wide valve angle, 86 kW (115 hp) 1988/89, 101 kW (135 hp) 1990/91 GT-S

North American market chassis code & (VIN code): The Japanese built E90 has a JT2 VIN prefix while the NUMMI made E90 used 1NX (Toyota) and 1Y1 (Geo) VIN prefixes and the Cambridge built E90 has a 2T1 prefix.

- AE92 — Sedan 4-door Std (AE91 vin), DX (AE94 vin), LE (AE93 or AE97 vin)
- AE92 — Coupé 2-door SR5 (AE96 vin), GT-S (AE98 vin – model equivalent to Sprinter Trueno with pop-up headlights)
- AE92 — FWD wagon 5-door DX (AE94 vin)
- AE95 — 4WD sedan 4-door All-Trac/4WD (AE94 vin)
- AE95 — FWD/4WD wagon 5-door Std, DX, All-Trac (AE95 vin)
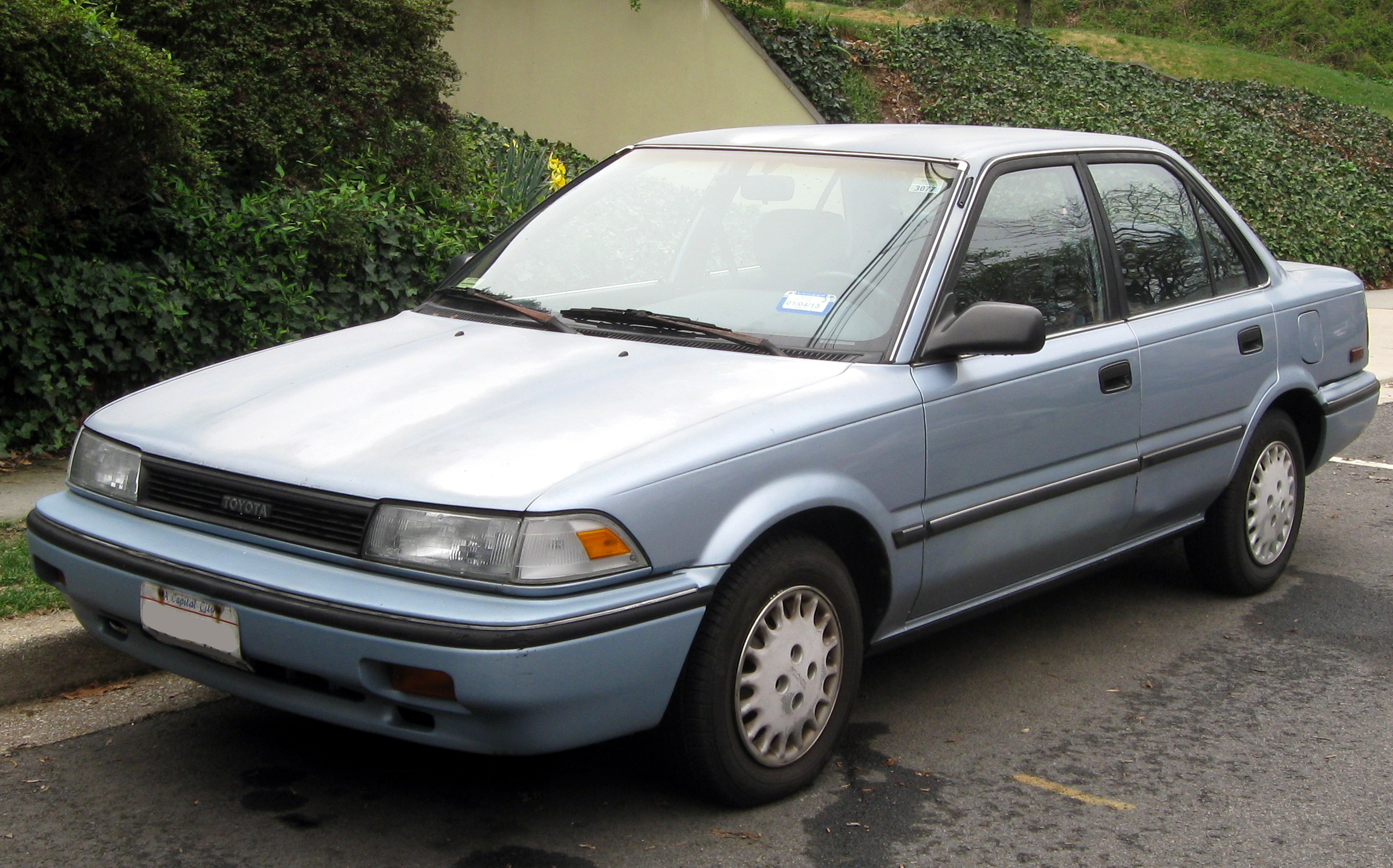
Corolla LE Sedan (US)

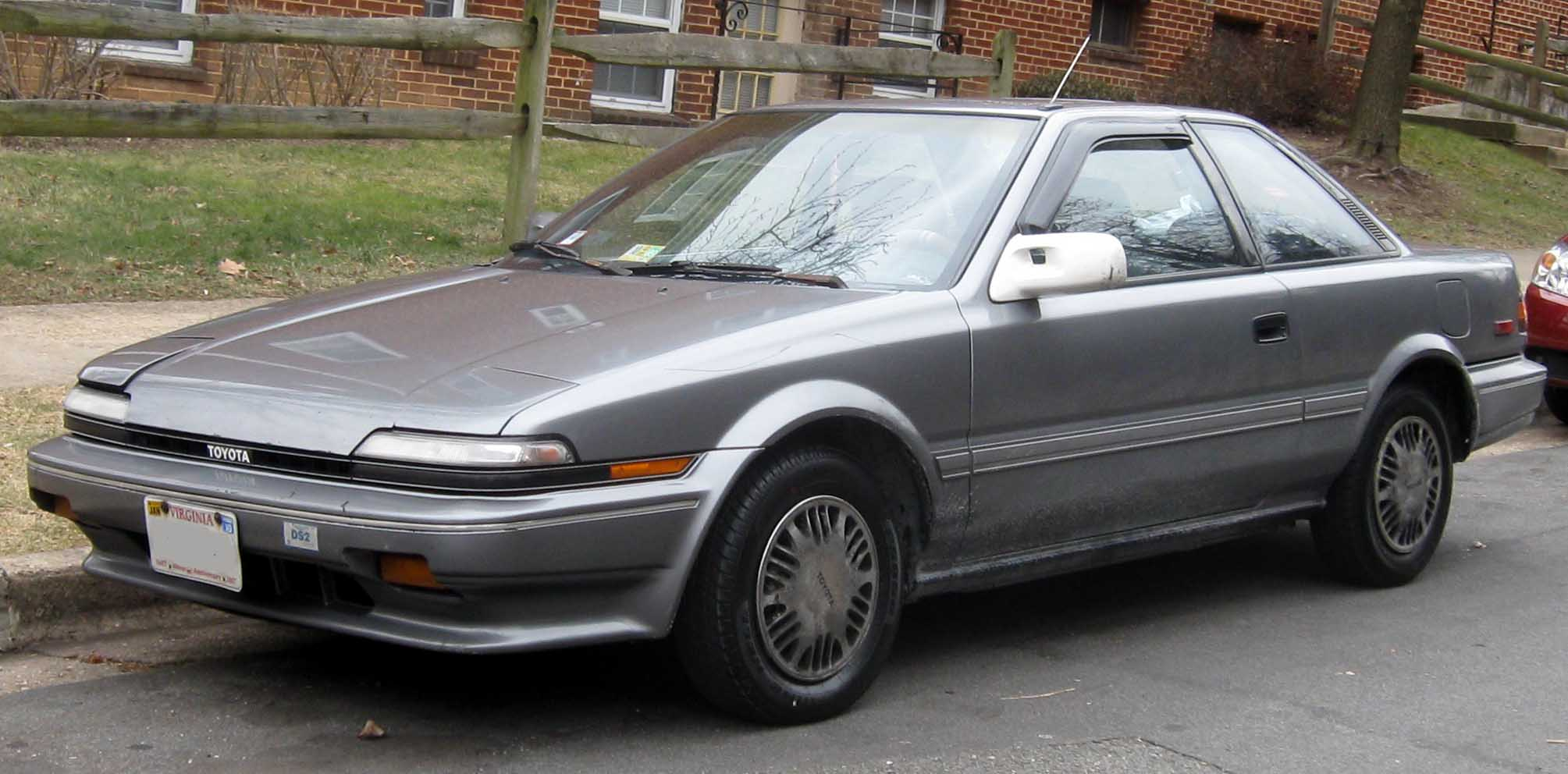
Corolla Sport SR5 Coupe (US)

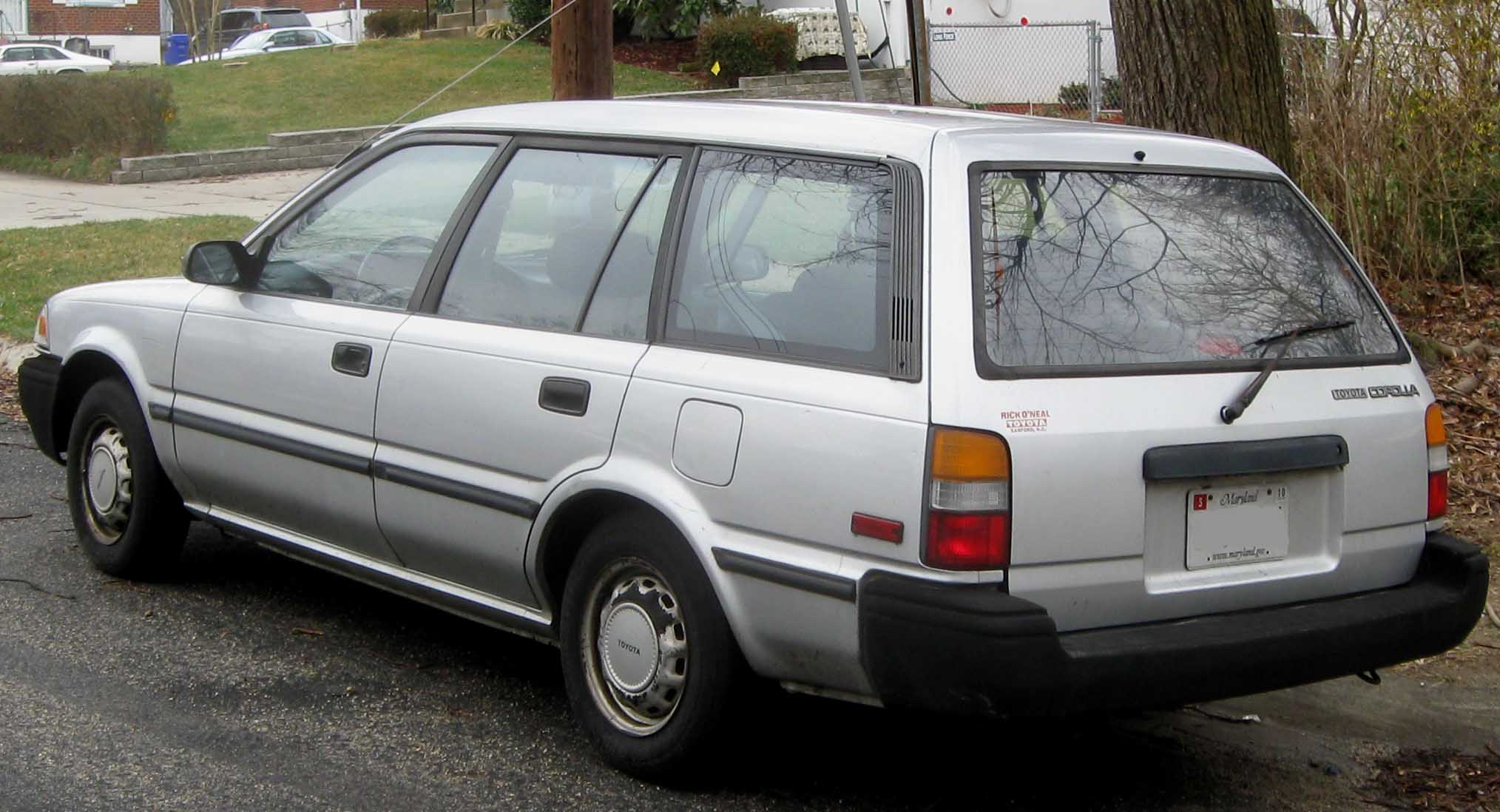
Corolla 1.6 DX Wagon (US)

== South Africa ==
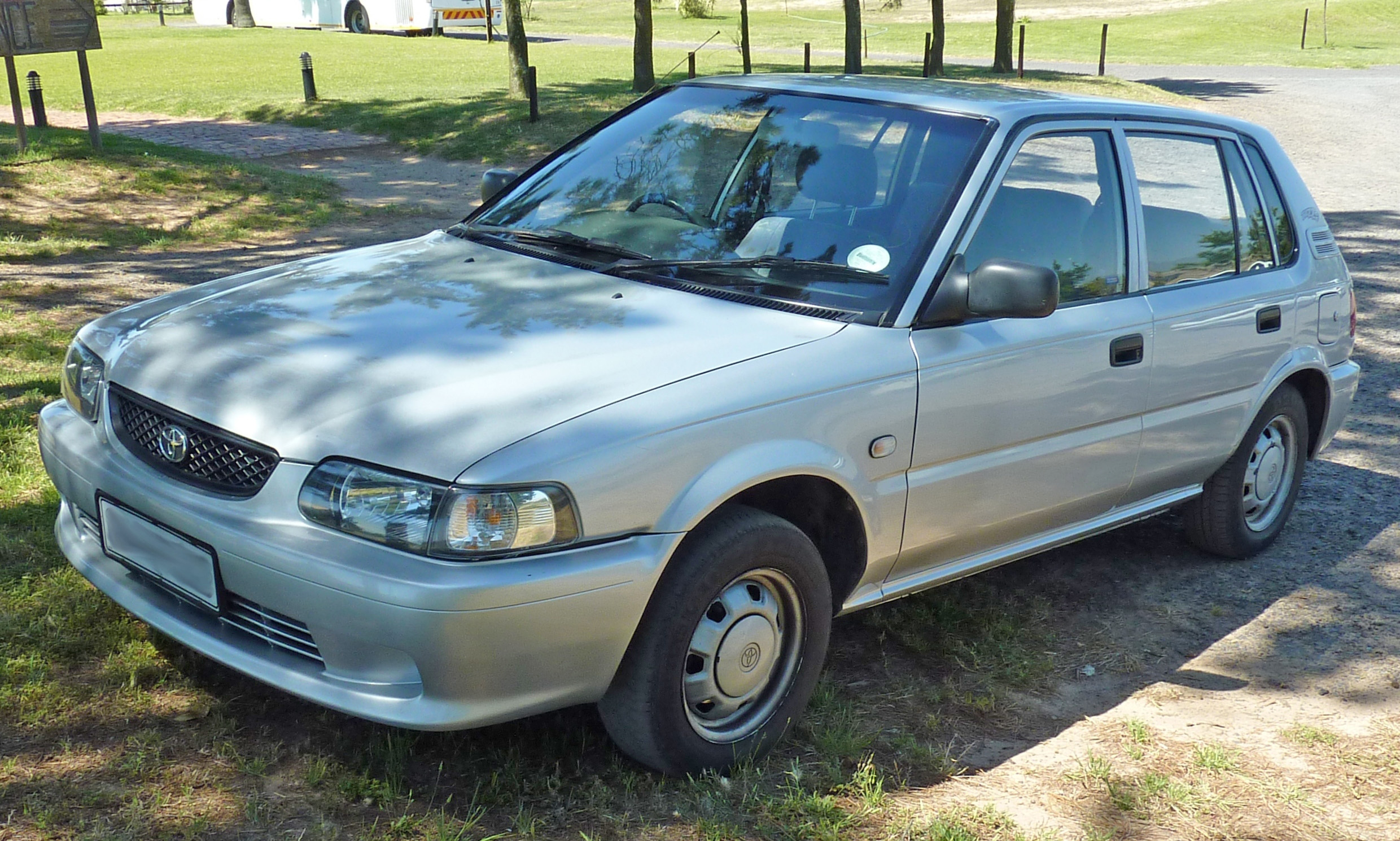

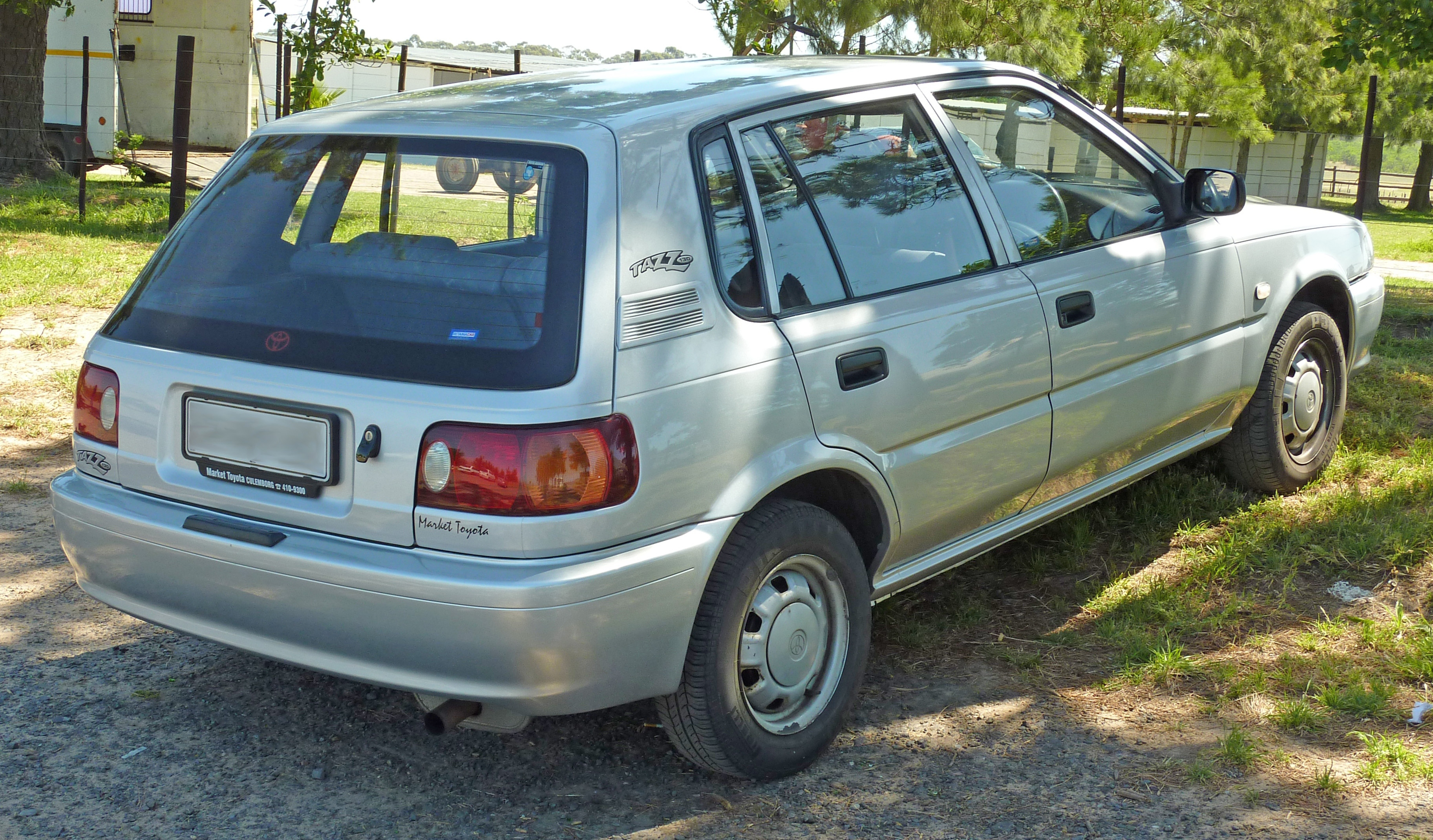
Toyota Tazz (South Africa)

There were only two body styles sold in South Africa. The sixth-generation five-door hatchback that was made in South Africa was marketed as the Toyota Conquest. The four-door sedan was also available, but with "Corolla" badging. Production began in October 1988, with a 1.3 litre 53 kW (72 hp) "2E" engine or the 1.6 litre "4A-F" with 70 kW (95 hp). The twin cam version of this was also sold, as the GLi Twin Cam for the sedan and RSi for the hatchback (4A-GE), with 100 kW (136 hp). It was also sold as a panel van called the Conquest Carri. The Conquest Carri was simply known as the Toyota Carri from 2000.

From September 1993 on, power outputs changed to 55 and 79 kW (75 and 107 hp) for the 130 and 160i respectively, for the Conquest as well as the Corolla. The 130 was only available with a four-speed manual. The Conquest and Corolla were also available in the 1.8 litre, 85 kW (116 hp) 7A-FE engined model beginning in September 1993; this replaced the earlier 1.6 Twin Cam in the Conquest and was available in a number of equipment levels in the Corolla (sedan), from GL to the mildly sporting GSX.

In October 1996, an entry-level model called the Toyota Conquest Tazz appeared. This model had a very low equipment level, originally only available with a four-speed manual mated to the 1.3l 2E engine and missing things such as a rear windshield wiper or a cigarette lighter – however, the Tazz did receive a twin-tip exhaust and body coloured bumpers. A five-speed became available three years later. The higher end version was called the Conquest Zip and was powered by the 1.6-litre, 4A-FE engine. The first version of the Tazz was only offered with a 1300 cc engine, while the facelifted version offered two models: 130, and 160i - power figures being the same as for the Corolla. From October 2000, the car received a light facelift with a more ovoid front end treatment and the name was changed to simply Toyota Tazz as the Conquest label was retired. This model continued to be built until July 5, 2006.

== See also ==
- Geo Prizm
- Holden Nova
