= Gary Rush =

Gary Rush may refer to:

- Gary Rush, character in Silk (TV series)
- Gary Rush, candidate in Electoral results for the Division of St George
