= 1994 Australian Touring Car season =

Seasons
- ← 1993 1995 →

The 1994 Australian Touring Car season was the 35th year of touring car racing in Australia since the first runnings of the Australian Touring Car Championship and the fore-runner of the present day Bathurst 1000, the Armstrong 500.

Two major touring car categories raced in Australia during 1994, 5.0 Litre Touring Cars and 2.0 Litre Touring Cars. Between them there were 21 touring car race meetings held during 1994; a ten-round series for 5.0 Litre and 2.0 Litre Touring Cars - the 1994 Australian Touring Car Championship (ATCC); a six-round series for 2.0 Litre Touring Cars - the 1994 Australian Manufacturers' Championship (AMC); support programme events at the 1994 Australian Grand Prix and 1994 Australian FAI Indycar Grand Prix, two stand alone long-distance races, nicknamed 'enduros'; the Winfield Triple Challenge at Eastern Creek Raceway.

== Results and standings ==
=== Race calendar ===
The 1994 Australian touring car season consisted of 21 events.

Date	Series	Circuit	City / state	Winner	Team	Car	Report
30 Jan	Winfield Triple Challenge	Eastern Creek Raceway	Sydney, New South Wales	Glenn Seton	Peter Jackson Racing	Ford EB Falcon	
27 Feb	ATCC Round 1	Amaroo Park	Sydney, New South Wales	Mark Skaife	Winfield Racing Team	Holden VP Commodore	report
6 Mar	ATCC Round 2	Sandown International Raceway	Melbourne, Victoria	Mark Skaife	Winfield Racing Team	Holden VP Commodore	report
13 Mar	ATCC Round 3	Symmons Plains Raceway	Launceston, Tasmania	Mark Skaife	Winfield Racing Team	Holden VP Commodore	report
19 - 20 Mar	Courier Mail Gold Coast 100	Surfers Paradise street circuit	Surfers Paradise, Queensland	John Bowe	Shell FAI Racing	Ford EB Falcon	
10 Apr	ATCC Round 4	Phillip Island Grand Prix Circuit	Phillip Island, Victoria	Glenn Seton	Peter Jackson Racing	Ford EB Falcon	report
17 Apr	AMC Round 1	Eastern Creek Raceway	Sydney, New South Wales	Tony Longhurst	LoGaMo Racing	BMW 318i	
24 Apr	ATCC Round 5	Lakeside International Raceway	Brisbane, Queensland	Larry Perkins	Castrol Perkins Racing	Holden VP Commodore	report
15 May	ATCC Round 6	Winton Motor Raceway	Benalla, Victoria	Glenn Seton	Peter Jackson Racing	Ford EB Falcon	report
22 May	AMC Round 2	Phillip Island Grand Prix Circuit	Phillip Island, Victoria	Paul Morris	LoGaMo Racing	BMW 318i	
5 Jun	ATCC Round 7	Eastern Creek Raceway	Sydney, New South Wales	Peter Brock	Holden Racing Team	Holden VP Commodore	report
19 Jun	AMC Round 3	Winton Motor Raceway	Benalla, Victoria	Paul Morris	LoGaMo Racing	BMW 318i	
26 Jun	ATCC Round 8	Mallala Motor Sport Park	Adelaide, South Australia	Mark Skaife	Winfield Racing Team	Holden VP Commodore	report
3 Jul	ATCC Round 9	Barbagallo Raceway	Perth, Western Australia	Alan Jones	Peter Jackson Racing	Ford EB Falcon	report
17 Jul	AMC Round 4	Lakeside International Raceway	Brisbane, Queensland	Tony Longhurst	LoGaMo Racing	BMW 318i	
24 Jul	ATCC Round 10	Oran Park Raceway	Sydney, New South Wales	Glenn Seton	Peter Jackson Racing	Ford EB Falcon	report
7 Aug	AMC Round 5	Mallala Motor Sport Park	Adelaide, South Australia	Tony Longhurst	LoGaMo Racing	BMW 318i	
28 Aug	AMC Round 6	Oran Park Raceway	Sydney, New South Wales	Paul Morris	LoGaMo Racing	BMW 318i	
4 Sep	Sandown 500	Sandown International Raceway	Melbourne, Victoria	Dick Johnson; John Bowe	Shell FAI Racing	Ford EB Falcon	report
2 Oct	Tooheys 1000	Mount Panorama Circuit	Bathurst, New South Wales	Dick Johnson; John Bowe	Shell FAI Racing	Ford EB Falcon	report
12 - 13 Nov	Sensational Adelaide Touring Cars	Adelaide Street Circuit	Adelaide, South Australia	John Bowe	Shell FAI Racing	Ford EB Falcon	

=== Winfield Triple Challenge ===
Held at Eastern Creek Raceway, this meeting featured 5.0 Litre Touring Cars, Superbikes and Drag Racing.

Driver	No.	Team	Car	Race 1	Race 2	Race 3	Points
(Australia) Glenn Seton	1	Peter Jackson Racing	Ford EB Falcon	2	2	1	78
(Australia) Alan Jones	30	Peter Jackson Racing	Ford EB Falcon	1	3	2	76
(Australia) Mark Skaife	2	Winfield Racing Team	Holden VP Commodore	3	1	3	74
(Australia) Larry Perkins	11	Castrol Perkins Racing	Holden VP Commodore	5	4	4	67
(Australia) Steve Reed	3	Lansvale Racing Team	Holden VP Commodore	10	5	5	59
(Australia) Brad Jones	7	Pro-Duct Motorsport	Holden VP Commodore	7	7	6	58
(Australia) Bob Pearson	33	Pro-Duct Motorsport	Holden VP Commodore	6	6	7	58
(Australia) Terry Finnigan	27	Foodtown Racing	Holden VP Commodore	9	8	8	51
(Australia) Kevin Waldock	28	Playscape Racing	Ford EB Falcon	8	9	9	49
(Australia) Kevin Heffernan	32	PACE Racing	Holden VL Commodore SS Group A SV	13	10	10	41
(Australia) Steven Ellery	88	Steven Ellery Racing	Ford Sierra	14	11	11	37
(Australia) Glenn Mason	42		Holden VL Commodore SS Group A SV	12	12	12	36
(Australia) Phillip Browne	44	Group Motorsport	Holden VL Commodore SS Group A SV	15	13	13	30
(New Zealand) Jim Richards	6	Winfield Racing Team	Holden VP Commodore	4	Ret	Ret	17
(Australia) Neil Schembri	36	Schembri Motorsport	Holden VP Commodore	11	Ret	Ret	10

=== Courier Mail Gold Coast 100 ===
This meeting was a support event of the 1994 Australian FAI Indycar Grand Prix. Unusually the main event was held on the Saturday with the shorter sprint event held the next day.

Driver	No.	Team	Car	CM 100	CM Sprint
(Australia) John Bowe	18	Shell FAI Racing	Ford EB Falcon	1	1
(Australia) Alan Jones	30	Peter Jackson Racing	Ford EB Falcon	2	Ret
(Australia) Dick Johnson	17	Shell FAI Racing	Ford EB Falcon	3	2
(New Zealand) Jim Richards	6	Winfield Racing Team	Holden VP Commodore	4	8
(Australia) Tomas Mezera	015	Holden Racing Team	Holden VP Commodore	5	4
(Australia) Peter Brock	05	Holden Racing Team	Holden VP Commodore	6	Ret
(Australia) Glenn Seton	1	Peter Jackson Racing	Ford EB Falcon	7	5
(Australia) Paul Morris	23	LoGaMo Racing	Holden VP Commodore	8	6
(Australia) Tony Longhurst	25	LoGaMo Racing	Holden VP Commodore	9	7
(Australia) Larry Perkins	11	Castrol Perkins Racing	Holden VP Commodore	10	Ret
(Australia) Steve Reed	3	Lansvale Racing Team	Holden VP Commodore	11	Ret
(Australia) Kevin Waldock	28	Playscape Racing	Ford EB Falcon	12	Ret
(Australia) Chris Smerdon	39	Challenge Motorsport	Holden VP Commodore	13	Ret
(Australia) Terry Finnigan	27	Foodtown Racing	Holden VP Commodore	14	11
(Australia) Ian Palmer	20	Palmer Promotions	Holden VP Commodore	15	13
(Australia) Bob Jones	12	Ampol Max 3 Racing	Holden VP Commodore	16	10
(Australia) Wayne Gardner	4	Coca-Cola Racing	Holden VP Commodore	Ret	Ret
(Australia) Mark Skaife	2	Winfield Racing Team	Holden VP Commodore	Ret	3
(Australia) Stuart McColl	14		Holden VP Commodore	Ret	12
(Australia) Neil Crompton	7	Coca-Cola Racing	Holden VP Commodore	Ret	9

=== Sensational Adelaide Touring Cars ===
This meeting was a support event of the 1994 Australian Grand Prix.

Driver	No.	Team	Car	Race 1	Race 2
(Australia) John Bowe	18	Shell FAI Racing	Ford EB Falcon	1	1
(Australia) Dick Johnson	17	Shell FAI Racing	Ford EB Falcon	4	2
(Australia) Larry Perkins	11	Castrol Perkins Racing	Holden VP Commodore	2	3
(Australia) Glenn Seton	1	Peter Jackson Racing	Ford EB Falcon	3	4
(Australia) Mark Skaife	2	Winfield Racing Team	Holden VP Commodore	9	5
(New Zealand) Jim Richards	6	Winfield Racing Team	Holden VP Commodore	8	6
(Australia) Neil Crompton	7	Coca-Cola Racing	Holden VP Commodore	11	7
(Australia) Alan Jones	30	Peter Jackson Racing	Ford EB Falcon	6	8
(Australia) Craig Lowndes	016	Holden Racing Team	Holden VP Commodore	7	9
(Australia) Bob Jones	12	Ampol Max 3 Racing	Holden VP Commodore	12	10
(Australia) Phil Ward	10	Phil Ward Racing	Holden VP Commodore	Ret	11
(Australia) Wayne Gardner	4	Coca-Cola Racing	Holden VP Commodore	5	12
(Australia) Stuart McColl	14	McColl Group A Racing	Holden VP Commodore	14	13
(Australia) Peter Brock	05	Holden Racing Team	Holden VP Commodore	13	14
(Australia) Terry Finnigan	27	Foodtown Racing	Holden VP Commodore	Ret	15
(Australia) Trevor Ashby	3	Lansvale Racing Team	Holden VP Commodore	10	16
(Australia) Chris Smerdon	39	Challenge Motorsport	Holden VP Commodore	15	Ret
(Australia) Tomas Mezera	015	Holden Racing Team	Holden VP Commodore	Ret	DNS
