= 1994 ATCC Sandown round =

(Victoria (state)) 1994 Sandown ATCC round
Event Information
- Round 2 of 10 in the 1994 Australian Touring Car Championship
- Date: 4-6 March 1994
- Location: Melbourne, Victoria
- Venue: Sandown Raceway
- Weather: Fine

Results
Race 1
Distance	20 laps	62 km
Pole position	Tomas Mezera; Holden Racing Team	1:13.568
Winner	Mark Skaife; Gibson Motorsport	25:22.5541
Race 2
Distance	20 laps	62 km
Winner	Mark Skaife; Gibson Motorsport	23:52.3349
Round Results
First	Mark Skaife; Gibson Motorsport	40 pts
Second	Peter Brock; Holden Racing Team	23 pts
Third	Larry Perkins; Perkins Engineering	22 pts

The 1994 Sandown ATCC round was the second round of the 1994 Australian Touring Car Championship. It was held on the weekend of 4 to 6 March at Sandown Raceway in Melbourne, Victoria.

Mark Skaife continued the form exhibited from the opening round at Amaroo Park by winning both races and claiming overall round honours for the second weekend in succession. Tomas Mezera of the Holden Racing Team secured pole position for the first race and battled Skaife for the win before the latter scythed through on the exit of the last corner of the last lap.

== Background ==
The event was held on the weekend of 4 to 6 March 1994. It was the 23rd ATCC/V8 Supercar event to be held at the Sandown Raceway in the sprint format and consisted of two 20 lap races, as well as the three-lap Dash for Cash for the fastest six qualifiers. Starting positions for the "dash" were drawn at random. Results from the dash determined the first six positions on the starting grid for race one.

=== Entry list ===
A total of 22 drivers were entered into the weekend. With the exception of Steven Ellery who ran a Ford Sierra, the rest of the grid comprised either of the VP Holden Commodore or the EB Ford Falcon.

== Race results ==
=== Qualifying ===
Tomas Mezera carried through his pace demonstrated at Amaroo Park with a time of 1:13.568, to take his first pole position of the year. This was almost a second faster than his closest competitor, Mark Skaife.

Pos	No	Name	Team	Vehicle	Time
1	015	(Australia) Tomas Mezera	Holden Racing Team	Holden Commodore (VP)	1:13.568
2	2	(Australia) Mark Skaife	Gibson Motorsport	Holden Commodore (VP)	1:13.656
3	18	(Australia) John Bowe	Dick Johnson Racing	Ford Falcon (EB)	1:13.658
4	6	(New Zealand) Jim Richards	Gibson Motorsport	Holden Commodore (VP)	1:13.907
5	17	(Australia) Dick Johnson	Dick Johnson Racing	Ford Falcon (EB)	1:13.908
6	05	(Australia) Peter Brock	Holden Racing Team	Holden Commodore (VP)	1:13.982
7	30	(Australia) Alan Jones	Glenn Seton Racing	Ford Falcon (EB)	1:14.079
8	1	(Australia) Glenn Seton	Glenn Seton Racing	Ford Falcon (EB)	1:14.148
9	11	(Australia) Larry Perkins	Perkins Engineering	Holden Commodore (VP)	1:14.304
10	4	(Australia) Wayne Gardner	Wayne Gardner Racing	Holden Commodore (VP)	1:14.480
11	23	(Australia) Paul Morris	LoGaMo Racing	Holden Commodore (VP)	1:14.890
12	3	(Australia) Steve Reed	Lansvale Racing Team	Holden Commodore (VP)	1:14.896
13	7	(Australia) Neil Crompton	Wayne Gardner Racing	Holden Commodore (VP)	1:14.962
14	25	(Australia) Tony Longhurst	LoGaMo Racing	Holden Commodore (VP)	1:15.049
15	33	(Australia) Bob Pearson	Pro-Duct Motorsport	Holden Commodore (VP)	1:15.592
16	24	(Australia) Tony Scott	Pinnacle Motorsport	Holden Commodore (VP)	1:15.912
17	12	(Australia) Bob Jones	Ampol Max 3 Racing	Holden Commodore (VP)	1:16.270
18	39	(Australia) Chris Smerdon	Challenge Motorsport	Holden Commodore (VP)	1:16.694
19	14	(Australia) Stuart McColl	Stuart McColl Racing	Holden Commodore (VP)	1:17.652
20	47	(Australia) John Trimble	Daily Planet Racing	Holden Commodore (VP)	1:18.445
21	31	(Australia) James Philip	James Philip Racing	Holden Commodore (VL) SS Group A SV	1:21.191
22	88	(Australia) Steven Ellery	Steven Ellery Racing	Ford Sierra RS	1:23.291

=== Peter Jackson Dash ===
Mark Skaife would not make the start after his engine failed to start, leaving it a five-car race. John Bowe got off to a flyer and would keep the lead all the way to the flag.

Pos.	No.	Name	Team	Car	Grid
1	18	(Australia) John Bowe	Dick Johnson Racing	Ford Falcon (EB)	1
2	015	(Australia) Tomas Mezera	Holden Racing Team	Holden Commodore (VP)	3
3	05	(Australia) Peter Brock	Holden Racing Team	Holden Commodore (VP)	5
4	6	(New Zealand) Jim Richards	Gibson Motorsport	Holden Commodore (VP)	4
5	17	(Australia) Dick Johnson	Dick Johnson Racing	Ford Falcon (EB)	6
DNS	2	(Australia) Mark Skaife	Gibson Motorsport	Holden Commodore (VP)	2

=== Race 1 ===
Mezera got off to an early lead as Skaife made the most of the start - going from sixth to second by the end of the first corner. Both Dick Johnson and John Bowe ran into tyre problems early in the race, which would ultimately prove costly for the second race. On lap four, Skaife made a successful move on Mezera for the lead, however Skaife would not walk away with the lead as he did in Amaroo. For lap after lap, Mezera pressured Skaife. On the final corner on the final lap, Mezera made a move down the inside of Skaife to reclaim the lead. However, on the switchback, Skaife reclaimed the lead coming out of the corner to take the flag and win the first heat. Mezera finished in second and Alan Jones third.

Pos.	No.	Name	Team	Car	Laps	Time/Retired	Grid
1	2	(Australia) Mark Skaife	Gibson Motorsport	Holden Commodore (VP)	20	25:22.5541	6
2	015	(Australia) Tomas Mezera	Holden Racing Team	Holden Commodore (VP)	20	+ 0.254	2
3	30	(Australia) Alan Jones	Glenn Seton Racing	Ford Falcon (EB)	20	+ 3.690	7
4	1	(Australia) Glenn Seton	Glenn Seton Racing	Ford Falcon (EB)	20	+ 3.919	8
5	05	(Australia) Peter Brock	Holden Racing Team	Holden Commodore (VP)	20	+ 4.505	3
6	6	(New Zealand) Jim Richards	Gibson Motorsport	Holden Commodore (VP)	20	+ 4.785	4
7	11	(Australia) Larry Perkins	Perkins Engineering	Holden Commodore (VP)	20	+ 16.159	9
8	4	(Australia) Wayne Gardner	Wayne Gardner Racing	Holden Commodore (VP)	20	+ 18.234	10
9	25	(Australia) Tony Longhurst	LoGaMo Racing	Holden Commodore (VP)	20	+ 23.575	14
10	23	(Australia) Paul Morris	LoGaMo Racing	Holden Commodore (VP)	20	+ 29.625	11
11	7	(Australia) Neil Crompton	Wayne Gardner Racing	Holden Commodore (VP)	20	+ 31.044	13
12	3	(Australia) Steve Reed	Lansvale Racing Team	Holden Commodore (VP)	20	+ 35.664	12
13	24	(Australia) Tony Scott	Pinnacle Motorsport	Holden Commodore (VP)	20	+ 48.517	16
14	12	(Australia) Bob Jones	Ampol Max 3 Racing	Holden Commodore (VP)	20	+ 1:04.426	17
15	39	(Australia) Chris Smerdon	Challenge Motorsport	Holden Commodore (VP)	20	+ 1:14.321	18
16	14	(Australia) Stuart McColl	Stuart McColl Racing	Holden Commodore (VP)	19	+ 1 lap	19
17	47	(Australia) John Trimble	Daily Planet Racing	Holden Commodore (VP)	19	+ 1 lap	20
18	18	(Australia) John Bowe	Dick Johnson Racing	Ford Falcon (EB)	19	+ 1 lap	1
19	17	(Australia) Dick Johnson	Dick Johnson Racing	Ford Falcon (EB)	19	+ 1 lap	5
20	31	(Australia) James Philip	James Philip Racing	Holden Commodore (VL) SS Group A SV	18	+ 2 laps	21
21	88	(Australia) Steven Ellery	Steven Ellery Racing	Ford Sierra RS	18	+ 2 laps	22
Ret	33	(Australia) Bob Pearson	Pro-Duct Motorsport	Holden Commodore (VP)	0	Retired	15

=== Race 2 ===
Skaife would make the most of the front row start and got off to an early lead, whilst Larry Perkins climbed up five positions to second. Meanwhile, back down the back, chaos ensued. Neil Crompton and Glenn Seton came into contact at turn two, which sent both competitors to the back of the field. Mezera came charging through the pack, eventually passing Perkins for second position and gaining on leader, Skaife. However, he would spin on the second-to-last corner, losing a number of positions. Skaife would go on to win the race, making it four wins in a row for the Gibson Motorsport driver, ahead of Perkins and Jim Richards.

Pos.	No.	Name	Team	Car	Laps	Time/Retired	Grid
1	2	(Australia) Mark Skaife	Gibson Motorsport	Holden Commodore (VP)	19	23:52.3349	1
2	11	(Australia) Larry Perkins	Perkins Engineering	Holden Commodore (VP)	19	+ 6.236	7
3	6	(New Zealand) Jim Richards	Gibson Motorsport	Holden Commodore (VP)	19	+ 6.536	6
4	05	(Australia) Peter Brock	Holden Racing Team	Holden Commodore (VP)	19	+ 12.217	5
5	18	(Australia) John Bowe	Dick Johnson Racing	Ford Falcon (EB)	19	+ 13.397	23
6	4	(Australia) Wayne Gardner	Wayne Gardner Racing	Holden Commodore (VP)	19	+ 17.249	8
7	30	(Australia) Alan Jones	Alan Jones Racing	Ford Falcon (EB)	19	+ 19.515	3
8	23	(Australia) Paul Morris	LoGaMo Racing	Holden Commodore (VP)	19	+ 21.622	10
9	25	(Australia) Tony Longhurst	LoGaMo Racing	Holden Commodore (VP)	19	+ 21.916	9
10	17	(Australia) Dick Johnson	Dick Johnson Racing	Ford Falcon (EB)	19	+ 26.149	24
11	3	(Australia) Steve Reed	Lansvale Racing Team	Holden Commodore (VP)	19	+ 32.246	12
12	24	(Australia) Tony Scott	Pinnacle Motorsport	Holden Commodore (VP)	19	+ 36.889	13
13	12	(Australia) Bob Jones	Ampol Max 3 Racing	Holden Commodore (VP)	19	+ 50.639	14
14	39	(Australia) Chris Smerdon	Challenge Motorsport	Holden Commodore (VP)	19	+ 53.642	15
15	015	(Australia) Tomas Mezera	Holden Racing Team	Holden Commodore (VP)	19	+ 1:09.407	2
16	14	(Australia) Stuart McColl	Stuart McColl Racing	Holden Commodore (VP)	19	+ 1:10.249	16
17	1	(Australia) Glenn Seton	Glenn Seton Racing	Ford Falcon (EB)	18	+ 1 lap	4
18	47	(Australia) John Trimble	Daily Planet Racing	Holden Commodore (VP)	18	+ 1 lap	17
19	31	(Australia) James Philip	James Philip Racing	Holden Commodore (VL) SS Group A SV	18	+ 1 lap	20
20	7	(Australia) Neil Crompton	Wayne Gardner Racing	Holden Commodore (VP)	17	+ 2 laps	11
21	88	(Australia) Steven Ellery	Steven Ellery Racing	Ford Sierra RS	17	+ 2 laps	21
22	33	(Australia) Bob Pearson	Pro-Duct Motorsport	Holden Commodore (VP)	17	+ 2 laps	22

== Championship Standings ==
Drivers' Championship standings

Pos.	No.	Driver	Team	Points
1	2	(Australia) Mark Skaife	Gibson Motorsport	86
2	05	(Australia) Peter Brock	Holden Racing Team	47
3	1	(Australia) Glenn Seton	Glenn Seton Racing	46
4	015	(Australia) Tomas Mezera	Holden Racing Team	37
5	6	(New Zealand) Jim Richards	Gibson Motorsport	36
