= 1994 ATCC Mallala round =

(South Australia) 1994 Mallala ATCC round
Event Information
- Round 8 of 10 in the 1994 Australian Touring Car Championship
- Date: 24–26 June 1994
- Location: Mallala, South Australia
- Venue: Mallala Motor Sport Park
- Weather: Light Rain, Fine

Results
Race 1
Distance	21 laps	54 km
Pole position	Peter Brock; Holden Racing Team	1:10.730
Winner	Jim Richards; Gibson Motorsport	
Race 2
Distance	21 laps	54 km
Winner	Mark Skaife; Gibson Motorsport	
Round Results
First	Mark Skaife; Gibson Motorsport	36 pts
Second	Jim Richards; Gibson Motorsport	34 pts
Third	Alan Jones; Glenn Seton Racing	25 pts

The 1994 Mallala ATCC round was the eighth round of the 1994 Australian Touring Car Championship. It was held on the weekend of 24 to 26 July at Mallala Motor Sport Park in Mallala, South Australia.

== Race results ==
=== Race 1 ===
Neil Crompton got off to a flyer, thanks to the intermediate tires and began pulling away immediately. With the track drying out, Seton began to reel Crompton in, and after a few laps, passed him for the lead. Meanwhile, both the Gibson Motorsport cars were moving up the pack and with the rain starting to come back, the dynamic of the race began to change. Skaife took the lead from Seton, who began to struggle on the slick tires, and Richards followed shortly thereafter. Crompton spun at turn two, ripping the front spoiler off and retired shortly thereafter. Skaife began the final lap in the lead, but would end up losing the race on the last section of the circuit as teammate Richards passed him, taking his first win of the season.

Pos.	No.	Name	Team	Car	Laps	Time/Retired	Grid
1	6	(New Zealand) Jim Richards	Gibson Motorsport	Holden Commodore (VP)	21	27:27.9770	
2	2	(Australia) Mark Skaife	Gibson Motorsport	Holden Commodore (VP)	21	+ 0.782	
3	05	(Australia) Peter Brock	Holden Racing Team	Holden Commodore (VP)	21	+ 9.449	1
4	1	(Australia) Glenn Seton	Glenn Seton Racing	Ford Falcon (EB)	21	+ 19.155	3
5	30	(Australia) Alan Jones	Glenn Seton Racing	Ford Falcon (EB)	21	+ 23.018	6
6	015	(Australia) Tomas Mezera	Holden Racing Team	Holden Commodore (VP)	21	+ 33.108	
7	11	(Australia) Larry Perkins	Perkins Engineering	Holden Commodore (VP)	21	+ 37.960	5
8	18	(Australia) John Bowe	Dick Johnson Racing	Ford Falcon (EB)	21	+ 43.693	
9	23	(Australia) Paul Morris	LoGaMo Racing	Holden Commodore (VP)	21	+ 1:03.791	
10	24	(Australia) Greg Crick	Pinnacle Motorsport	Holden Commodore (VP)	20	+ 1 lap	
11	12	(Australia) Bob Jones	Ampol Max 3 Racing	Holden Commodore (VP)	20	+ 1 lap	
12	4	(Australia) Wayne Gardner	Wayne Gardner Racing	Holden Commodore (VP)	20	+ 1 lap	
13	26	(Australia) Don Watson	Don Watson Racing	Holden Commodore (VP)	20	+ 1 lap	
14	25	(Australia) Tony Longhurst	LoGaMo Racing	Holden Commodore (VP)	20	+ 1 lap	7
15	62	(Australia) Wayne Russell	Novocastrian Motorsport	Holden Commodore (VL) SS Group A SV	19	+ 2 laps	
16	3	(Australia) Steve Reed	Lansvale Racing Team	Holden Commodore (VP)	19	+ 2 laps	
17	14	(Australia) Stuart McColl	Stuart McColl Racing	Holden Commodore (VP)	19	+ 2 laps	
18	47	(Australia) John Trimble	Daily Planet Racing	Holden Commodore (VP)	18	+ 3 laps	
Ret	7	(Australia) Neil Crompton	Wayne Gardner Racing	Holden Commodore (VP)	17	Spoiler	4
Ret	17	(Australia) Dick Johnson	Dick Johnson Racing	Ford Falcon (EB)	12	Throttle	
Ret	39	(Australia) Chris Smerdon	Challenge Motorsport	Holden Commodore (VP)	4	Retired	

=== Race 2 ===
Skaife led off the line, with Seton in second and Richards in third. Bowe would retire from the race after the rear spoiler became dislodged from the Dick Johnson Racing Falcon. Perkins and Richards were locked in an intense battle for the final podium spot, which ultimately saw Perkins emerging victorious. Tomas Mezera retired from the race following terminal problems with his Commodore. Seton's campaign went up in smoke as his Peter Jackson Falcon caught fire, which effectively gave Skaife a clean run to the line. Skaife was the victor, Perkins in second and Jim Richards in third.

Pos.	No.	Name	Team	Car	Laps	Time/Retired	Grid
1	2	(Australia) Mark Skaife	Gibson Motorsport	Holden Commodore (VP)	21	24:46.3756	2
2	11	(Australia) Larry Perkins	Perkins Engineering	Holden Commodore (VP)	21	+ 3.494	7
3	6	(New Zealand) Jim Richards	Gibson Motorsport	Holden Commodore (VP)	21	+ 8.930	1
4	30	(Australia) Alan Jones	Glenn Seton Racing	Ford Falcon (EB)	21	+ 9.311	5
5	17	(Australia) Dick Johnson	Dick Johnson Racing	Ford Falcon (EB)	21	+ 9.500	19
6	25	(Australia) Tony Longhurst	LoGaMo Racing	Holden Commodore (VP)	21	+ 10.709	14
7	05	(Australia) Peter Brock	Holden Racing Team	Holden Commodore (VP)	21	+ 11.211	3
8	4	(Australia) Wayne Gardner	Wayne Gardner Racing	Holden Commodore (VP)	21	+ 15.353	12
9	7	(Australia) Neil Crompton	Wayne Gardner Racing	Holden Commodore (VP)	21	+ 16.269	18
10	12	(Australia) Bob Jones	Ampol Max 3 Racing	Holden Commodore (VP)	21	+ 36.946	11
11	24	(Australia) Greg Crick	Pinnacle Motorsport	Holden Commodore (VP)	21	+ 37.329	10
12	39	(Australia) Chris Smerdon	Challenge Motorsport	Holden Commodore (VP)	21	+ 59.437	20
13	14	(Australia) Stuart McColl	Stuart McColl Racing	Holden Commodore (VP)	21	+ 59.901	16
14	3	(Australia) Steve Reed	Lansvale Racing Team	Holden Commodore (VP)	21	+ 1:06.431	15
15	26	(Australia) Don Watson	Don Watson Racing	Holden Commodore (VP)	21	+ 1:07.287	13
16	47	(Australia) John Trimble	Daily Planet Racing	Holden Commodore (VP)	20	+ 1 lap	17
17	62	(Australia) Wayne Russell	Novocastrian Motorsport	Holden Commodore (VL) SS Group A SV	19	+ 2 laps	
Ret	1	(Australia) Glenn Seton	Glenn Seton Racing	Ford Falcon (EB)	16	Fire	4
Ret	015	(Australia) Tomas Mezera	Holden Racing Team	Holden Commodore (VP)	7	Accident	6
Ret	23	(Australia) Paul Morris	LoGaMo Racing	Holden Commodore (VP)	6	Retired	9
Ret	18	(Australia) John Bowe	Dick Johnson Racing	Ford Falcon (EB)	2	Accident	8

== Championship Standings ==
Drivers' Championship standings

Pos.	No.	Driver	Team	Points
1	2	(Australia) Mark Skaife	Gibson Motorsport	280
2	05	(Australia) Peter Brock	Holden Racing Team	185
3	1	(Australia) Glenn Seton	Glenn Seton Racing	181
4	6	(New Zealand) Jim Richards	Gibson Motorsport	137
5	11	(Australia) Larry Perkins	Perkins Engineering	134
