= 1994 ATCC Oran Park round =

(New South Wales) 1994 Oran Park ATCC round
Event Information
- Round 10 of 10 in the 1994 Australian Touring Car Championship
- Date: 22–24 July 1994
- Location: Sydney, New South Wales
- Venue: Oran Park Raceway
- Weather: Fine

Results
Race 1
Distance	22 laps	57 km
Pole position	John Bowe; Dick Johnson Racing	1:08.400
Winner	Glenn Seton; Glenn Seton Racing	
Race 2
Distance	22 laps	57 km
Winner	Glenn Seton; Glenn Seton Racing	
Round Results
First	Glenn Seton; Glenn Seton Racing	43 pts
Second	Peter Brock; Holden Racing Team	32 pts
Third	Dick Johnson; Dick Johnson Racing	24 pts

The 1994 Oran Park ATCC round was the tenth and final round of the 1994 Australian Touring Car Championship. It was held on the weekend of 22 to 24 July at Oran Park Raceway in Sydney, New South Wales.

== Race results ==
=== Qualifying ===
Pos.	No.	Name	Team	Car	Time
1	18	(Australia) John Bowe	Dick Johnson Racing	Ford EB Falcon	1:08.400
2	1	(Australia) Glenn Seton	Glenn Seton Racing	Ford EB Falcon	1:08.540
3	05	(Australia) Peter Brock	Holden Racing Team	Holden VP Commodore	1:08.560
4	11	(Australia) Larry Perkins	Perkins Engineering	Holden VP Commodore	1:08.670
5	17	(Australia) Dick Johnson	Dick Johnson Racing	Ford EB Falcon	1:08.750
6	015	(Australia) Tomas Mezera	Holden Racing Team	Holden VP Commodore	1:08.810
7	7	(Australia) Neil Crompton	Wayne Gardner Racing	Holden VP Commodore	1:08.850
8	30	(Australia) Alan Jones	Glenn Seton Racing	Ford EB Falcon	1:08.870
9	4	(Australia) Wayne Gardner	Wayne Gardner Racing	Holden VP Commodore	1:09.000
10	25	(Australia) Tony Longhurst	LoGaMo Racing	Holden VP Commodore	1:09.260
11	6	(New Zealand) Jim Richards	Gibson Motorsport	Holden VP Commodore	1:09.360
12	19	(Australia) Steven Johnson	Dick Johnson Racing	Ford EB Falcon	1:09.510
13	2	(Australia) Mark Skaife	Gibson Motorsport	Holden VP Commodore	1:09.540
14	23	(Australia) Paul Morris	LoGaMo Racing	Holden VP Commodore	1:09.960
15	24	(Australia) Tony Scott	Pinnacle Motorsport	Holden VP Commodore	1:10.360
16	3	(Australia) Steve Reed	Lansvale Racing Team	Holden VP Commodore	1:10.610
17	39	(Australia) Chris Smerdon	Challenge Motorsport	Holden VP Commodore	1:10.750
18	12	(Australia) Bob Jones	Ampol Max 3 Racing	Holden VP Commodore	1:10.770
19	26	(Australia) Don Watson	Don Watson Racing	Holden VP Commodore	1:11.070
20	28	(Australia) Kevin Waldock	Playscape Racing	Ford EB Falcon	1:11.620
21	47	(Australia) John Trimble	Daily Planet Racing	Holden VP Commodore	1:11.690
22	41	(Australia) Garry Willmington	Garry Willmington Performance	Ford EB Falcon	1:13.470
23	62	(Australia) Wayne Russell	Novocastrian Motorsport	Holden VL Commodore SS Group A SV	1:14.640
24	32	(Australia) Kevin Heffernan	Pace Racing	Holden VL Commodore SS Group A SV	1:14.810
25	36	(Australia) Neil Schembri	Schembri Motorsport	Holden VP Commodore	1:15.930
26	79	(Australia) Mike Conway	Cadillac Productions	Holden VL Commodore SS Group A SV	1:16.420
27	44	(Australia) George Ayoub	Group Motorsport	Holden VL Commodore SS Group A SV	1:18.470

=== Race 1 ===
As Glenn Seton leapt off the line, chaos ensued behind. Skaife, Longhurst and Garnder tangled down the pack, which sent Skaife and Longhurst off into the infield. In a bizarre incident, Kevin Waldock's rear right wheel caught fire and detached from the vehicle. Brock passed Bowe for second and pressured Seton all the way to line, although this would prove to be not enough. Seton would win, with Brock in second and Johnson in third.

Pos.	No.	Name	Team	Car	Laps	Time/Retired	Grid
1	1	(Australia) Glenn Seton	Glenn Seton Racing	Ford Falcon (EB)	21	24:32.6188	2
2	05	(Australia) Peter Brock	Holden Racing Team	Holden Commodore (VP)	21	+ 0.286	3
3	17	(Australia) Dick Johnson	Dick Johnson Racing	Ford Falcon (EB)	21	+ 6.495	5
4	18	(Australia) John Bowe	Dick Johnson Racing	Ford Falcon (EB)	21	+ 11.181	1
5	11	(Australia) Larry Perkins	Perkins Engineering	Holden Commodore (VP)	21	+ 11.381	4
6	4	(Australia) Wayne Gardner	Wayne Gardner Racing	Holden Commodore (VP)	21	+ 15.625	9
7	7	(Australia) Neil Crompton	Wayne Gardner Racing	Holden Commodore (VP)	21	+ 17.100	7
8	015	(Australia) Tomas Mezera	Holden Racing Team	Holden Commodore (VP)	21	+ 17.788	6
9	23	(Australia) Paul Morris	LoGaMo Racing	Holden Commodore (VP)	21	+ 27.444	14
10	6	(New Zealand) Jim Richards	Gibson Motorsport	Holden Commodore (VP)	21	+ 33.658	11
11	19	(Australia) Steven Johnson	Dick Johnson Racing	Ford Falcon (EB)	21	+ 34.265	12
12	24	(Australia) Tony Scott	Pinnacle Motorsport	Holden Commodore (VP)	21	+ 38.135	15
13	12	(Australia) Bob Jones	Ampol Max 3 Racing	Holden Commodore (VP)	21	+ 49.704	18
14	39	(Australia) Chris Smerdon	Challenge Motorsport	Holden Commodore (VP)	21	+ 49.867	17
15	47	(Australia) John Trimble	Daily Planet Racing	Holden Commodore (VP)	21	+ 1:00.297	21
16	26	(Australia) Don Watson	Don Watson Racing	Holden Commodore (VP)	21	+ 1:04.486	19
17	41	(Australia) Garry Willmington	Garry Willmington Performance	Ford Falcon (EB)	20	+ 1 lap	22
18	44	(Australia) George Ayoub	Group Motorsport	Holden Commodore (VL) SS Group A SV	18	+ 3 laps	27
Ret	30	(Australia) Alan Jones	Glenn Seton Racing	Ford Falcon (EB)	16	Retired	8
Ret	3	(Australia) Steve Reed	Lansvale Racing Team	Holden Commodore (VP)	15	Retired	16
Ret	28	(Australia) Kevin Waldock	Playscape Racing	Ford Falcon (EB)	13	Tyre / Fire	20
Ret	32	(Australia) Kevin Heffernan	PACE Racing	Holden Commodore (VL) SS Group A SV	13	Retired	24
Ret	25	(Australia) Tony Longhurst	LoGaMo Racing	Holden Commodore (VP)	9	Accident	10
Ret	79	(Australia) Mike Conway	Cadillac Productions	Holden Commodore (VL) SS Group A SV	2	Accident	26
Ret	2	(Australia) Mark Skaife	Gibson Motorsport	Holden Commodore (VP)	1	Retired	13
DNS	36	(Australia) Neil Schembri	Schembri Motorsport	Holden Commodore (VP)		Did not start	
DNS	62	(Australia) Wayne Russell	Novacastrian Motorsport	Holden Commodore (VL) SS Group A SV		Did not start	

=== Race 2 ===
For the final race of the year, Brock and Seton were dead even off the line, with Seton's track position allowing for him to obtain the lead by the first corner. Dick Johnson spun Wayne Gardner on the final corner after attempting a move for position. Skaife's horror weekend continued as he spun coming out of the bridge, falling down the pack. Up the front, Glenn Seton would make it two wins from two, with Peter Brock in second and Alan Jones in third.

Pos.	No.	Name	Team	Car	Laps	Time/Retired	Grid
1	1	(Australia) Glenn Seton	Glenn Seton Racing	Ford Falcon (EB)	21	24:23.4434	1
2	05	(Australia) Peter Brock	Holden Racing Team	Holden Commodore (VP)	21	+ 0.813	2
3	30	(Australia) Alan Jones	Glenn Seton Racing	Ford Falcon (EB)	21	+ 24.380	18
4	7	(Australia) Neil Crompton	Wayne Gardner Racing	Holden Commodore (VP)	21	+ 26.366	7
5	17	(Australia) Dick Johnson	Dick Johnson Racing	Ford Falcon (EB)	21	+ 28.502	3
6	18	(Australia) John Bowe	Dick Johnson Racing	Ford Falcon (EB)	21	+ 28.901	4
7	015	(Australia) Tomas Mezera	Holden Racing Team	Holden Commodore (VP)	21	+ 29.403	8
8	23	(Australia) Paul Morris	LoGaMo Racing	Holden Commodore (VP)	21	+ 29.736	9
9	4	(Australia) Wayne Gardner	Wayne Gardner Racing	Holden Commodore (VP)	21	+ 31.632	6
10	11	(Australia) Larry Perkins	Perkins Engineering	Holden Commodore (VP)	21	+ 33.448	5
11	25	(Australia) Tony Longhurst	LoGaMo Racing	Holden Commodore (VP)	21	+ 45.082	21
12	6	(New Zealand) Jim Richards	Gibson Motorsport	Holden Commodore (VP)	21	+ 53.064	10
13	24	(Australia) Tony Scott	Pinnacle Motorsport	Holden Commodore (VP)	21	+ 57.948	12
14	19	(Australia) Steven Johnson	Dick Johnson Racing	Ford Falcon (EB)	21	+ 58.844	11
15	3	(Australia) Steve Reed	Lansvale Racing Team	Holden Commodore (VP)	21	+ 59.071	19
16	39	(Australia) Chris Smerdon	Challenge Motorsport	Holden Commodore (VP)	21	+ 1:00.849	14
17	12	(Australia) Bob Jones	Ampol Max 3 Racing	Holden Commodore (VP)	21	+ 1:07.677	13
18	26	(Australia) Don Watson	Don Watson Racing	Holden Commodore (VP)	21	+ 1:12.269	16
19	47	(Australia) John Trimble	Daily Planet Racing	Holden Commodore (VP)	20	+ 1 lap	15
20	41	(Australia) Garry Willmington	Garry Willmington Performance	Ford Falcon (EB)	20	+ 1 lap	17
21	36	(Australia) Neil Schembri	Schembri Motorsport	Holden Commodore (VP)	20	+ 1 lap	23
22	32	(Australia) Kevin Heffernan	PACE Racing	Holden Commodore (VL) SS Group A SV	19	+ 2 laps	
23	44	(Australia) George Ayoub	Group Motorsport	Holden Commodore (VL) SS Group A SV	18	+ 3 laps	
NC	62	(Australia) Wayne Russell	Novacastrian Motorsport	Holden Commodore (VL) SS Group A SV	11	+ 10 laps	
Ret	2	(Australia) Mark Skaife	Gibson Motorsport	Holden Commodore (VP)	14	Retired	22
DNS	28	(Australia) Kevin Waldock	Playscape Racing	Ford Falcon (EB)		Did not start	
DNS	79	(Australia) Mike Conway	Cadillac Productions	Holden Commodore (VL) SS Group A SV		Did not start	

== Championship Standings ==
Drivers' Championship standings

Pos.	No.	Driver	Team	Points
1	2	(Australia) Mark Skaife	Gibson Motorsport	285
2	1	(Australia) Glenn Seton	Glenn Seton Racing	228
3	05	(Australia) Peter Brock	Holden Racing Team	222
4	11	(Australia) Larry Perkins	Perkins Engineering	177
5	30	(Australia) Alan Jones	Glenn Seton Racing	177
