= 1994 ATCC Phillip Island round =

(Victoria (state)) 1994 ATCC Phillip Island round
Event Information
- Round 4 of 10 in the 1994 Australian Touring Car Championship
- Date: 8-10 April 1994
- Location: Phillip Island, Victoria
- Venue: Phillip Island Grand Prix Circuit
- Weather: Moderate Rain, Fine

Results
Race 1
Distance	16 laps	71 km
Pole position	Peter Brock; Holden Racing Team	1:34.740
Winner	Glenn Seton; Glenn Seton Racing	30:52.0816
Race 2
Distance	16 laps	71 km
Winner	Glenn Seton; Glenn Seton Racing	25:56.0715
Round Results
First	Glenn Seton; Glenn Seton Racing	40 pts
Second	Peter Brock; Holden Racing Team	31 pts
Third	Mark Skaife; Gibson Motorsport	31 pts

The 1994 ATCC Phillip Island round was the fourth round of the 1994 Australian Touring Car Championship. It was held on the weekend of 8 to 10 April at Phillip Island Grand Prix Circuit in Phillip Island, Victoria.

Glenn Seton broke Mark Skaife's dominant streak in the championship by winning both races and claiming overall round honours for the first time in 1994. Peter Brock claimed pole position for the first race and would finish second for the round while Skaife rounded out the podium.

== Background ==
The event was held on the weekend of 8 to 10 April 1994. It was the third ATCC/V8 Supercar event to be held at the Phillip Island Grand Prix Circuit and consisted of two 16-lap races, as well as the three-lap Dash for Cash for the fastest six qualifiers. Starting positions for the "dash" were drawn at random. Results from the dash determined the first six positions on the starting grid for race one.

=== Entry list ===
A total of 17 drivers were entered into the weekend.

John Trimble, Trevor Ashby, Kevin Waldock and Chris Smerdon returned to the series after missing the previous round at Symmons Plains.

== Race results ==
=== Qualifying ===
Peter Brock took his first pole position of the year and the second for the Holden Racing Team. Just one-tenth behind was John Bowe and two-tenths behind was team-mate, Tomas Mezera.

Pos.	No.	Name	Team	Car	Grid
1	05	(Australia) Peter Brock	Holden Racing Team	Holden Commodore (VP)	1:34.740
2	18	(Australia) John Bowe	Dick Johnson Racing	Ford Falcon (EB)	1:34.750
3	015	(Australia) Tomas Mezera	Holden Racing Team	Holden Commodore (VP)	1:34.950
4	1	(Australia) Glenn Seton	Glenn Seton Racing	Ford Falcon (EB)	1:35.060
5	2	(Australia) Mark Skaife	Gibson Motorsport	Holden Commodore (VP)	1:35.140
6	30	(Australia) Alan Jones	Glenn Seton Racing	Ford Falcon (EB)	1:35.310
7	17	(Australia) Dick Johnson	Dick Johnson Racing	Ford Falcon (EB)	1:35.350
8	11	(Australia) Larry Perkins	Perkins Engineering	Holden Commodore (VP)	1:35.620
9	7	(Australia) Neil Crompton	Wayne Gardner Racing	Holden Commodore (VP)	1:36.350
10	6	(New Zealand) Jim Richards	Gibson Motorsport	Holden Commodore (VP)	1:36.380
11	4	(Australia) Wayne Gardner	Wayne Gardner Racing	Holden Commodore (VP)	1:36.490
12	3	(Australia) Trevor Ashby	Lansvale Racing Team	Holden Commodore (VP)	1:36.900
13	24	(Australia) Greg Crick	Pinnacle Motorsport	Holden Commodore (VP)	1:37.900
14	12	(Australia) Bob Jones	Ampol Max 3 Racing	Holden Commodore (VP)	1:38.170
15	39	(Australia) Chris Smerdon	Challenge Motorsport	Holden Commodore (VP)	1:39.230
16	28	(Australia) Kevin Waldock	Playscape Racing	Ford Falcon (EB)	1:39.280
17	47	(Australia) John Trimble	Daily Planet Racing	Holden Commodore (VP)	1:41.430

=== Peter Jackson Dash ===
Alan Jones came from the back of the grid to win the Peter Jackson Dash and take the front row slot for the first race. John Bowe maintained second position as Peter Brock fell through the pack to fifth.

Pos.	No.	Name	Team	Car	Grid
1	30	(Australia) Alan Jones	Glenn Seton Racing	Ford Falcon (EB)	6
2	18	(Australia) John Bowe	Dick Johnson Racing	Ford Falcon (EB)	2
3	2	(Australia) Mark Skaife	Gibson Motorsport	Holden Commodore (VP)	5
4	1	(Australia) Glenn Seton	Glenn Seton Racing	Ford Falcon (EB)	4
5	05	(Australia) Peter Brock	Holden Racing Team	Holden Commodore (VP)	1
6	015	(Australia) Tomas Mezera	Holden Racing Team	Holden Commodore (VP)	3

=== Race 1 ===
Before the start of the race, the rain started to descend upon the circuit. Some drivers opted to pull into the pits for wet tyres before the start of the race, whilst others gambled on the rain dissipating and track drying up. However, even before the first lap was finished, the drivers on wet tyres had overtaken most of the pack. Soon, everyone was struggling in the tricky conditions, with drivers such as Mark Skaife spinning off the circuit. Though, whilst plagued by the spin, Skaife began to charge up the field and soon found himself bearing down on race leader, Glenn Seton. However, it was not enough and Glenn Seton had won his first race of the 1994 season with Skaife in second and Alan Jones in third.

Pos.	No.	Name	Team	Car	Laps	Time/Retired	Grid
1	1	(Australia) Glenn Seton	Glenn Seton Racing	Ford Falcon (EB)	16	30:52.0816	4
2	2	(Australia) Mark Skaife	Gibson Motorsport	Holden Commodore (VP)	16	+ 1.732	3
3	30	(Australia) Alan Jones	Glenn Seton Racing	Ford Falcon (EB)	16	+ 15.673	1
4	05	(Australia) Peter Brock	Holden Racing Team	Holden Commodore (VP)	16	+ 22.524	5
5	7	(Australia) Neil Crompton	Wayne Gardner Racing	Holden Commodore (VP)	16	+ 26.008	9
6	17	(Australia) Dick Johnson	Dick Johnson Racing	Ford Falcon (EB)	16	+ 40.108	7
7	6	(New Zealand) Jim Richards	Gibson Motorsport	Holden Commodore (VP)	16	+ 52.527	10
8	4	(Australia) Wayne Gardner	Wayne Gardner Racing	Holden Commodore (VP)	16	+ 53.144	11
9	18	(Australia) John Bowe	Dick Johnson Racing	Ford Falcon (EB)	16	+ 57.335	2
10	015	(Australia) Tomas Mezera	Holden Racing Team	Holden Commodore (VP)	16	+ 1:06.329	6
11	11	(Australia) Larry Perkins	Perkins Engineering	Holden Commodore (VP)	16	+ 1:07.576	8
12	12	(Australia) Bob Jones	Ampol Max 3 Racing	Holden Commodore (VP)	15	+ 1 lap	14
13	24	(Australia) Greg Crick	Pinnacle Motorsport	Holden Commodore (VP)	15	+ 1 lap	13
14	28	(Australia) Kevin Waldock	Playscape Racing	Ford Falcon (EB)	15	+ 1 lap	16
15	47	(Australia) John Trimble	Daily Planet Racing	Holden Commodore (VP)	15	+ 1 lap	17
16	3	(Australia) Trevor Ashby	Lansvale Racing Team	Holden Commodore (VP)	14	+ 2 laps	12
17	39	(Australia) Chris Smerdon	Challenge Motorsport	Holden Commodore (VP)	14	+ 2 laps	15

=== Race 2 ===
With the rain gone, a different race played out. Though the damp track conditions caught out drivers such as Larry Perkins and Alan Jones, it was plain sailing for Glenn Seton as he took his second win of the season with Peter Brock in second and Mark Skaife in third.

Pos.	No.	Name	Team	Car	Laps	Time/Retired	Grid
1	1	(Australia) Glenn Seton	Glenn Seton Racing	Ford Falcon (EB)	16	25:56.0715	1
2	05	(Australia) Peter Brock	Holden Racing Team	Holden Commodore (VP)	16	+ 0.907	4
3	2	(Australia) Mark Skaife	Gibson Motorsport	Holden Commodore (VP)	16	+ 14.528	2
4	18	(Australia) John Bowe	Dick Johnson Racing	Ford Falcon (EB)	16	+ 16.617	9
5	015	(Australia) Tomas Mezera	Holden Racing Team	Holden Commodore (VP)	16	+ 16.784	10
6	17	(Australia) Dick Johnson	Dick Johnson Racing	Ford Falcon (EB)	16	+ 26.964	6
7	4	(Australia) Wayne Gardner	Wayne Gardner Racing	Holden Commodore (VP)	16	+ 35.961	8
8	6	(New Zealand) Jim Richards	Gibson Motorsport	Holden Commodore (VP)	16	+ 36.162	7
9	7	(Australia) Neil Crompton	Wayne Gardner Racing	Holden Commodore (VP)	16	+ 40.948	5
10	30	(Australia) Alan Jones	Glenn Seton Racing	Ford Falcon (EB)	16	+ 45.784	3
11	3	(Australia) Trevor Ashby	Lansvale Racing Team	Holden Commodore (VP)	16	+ 48.946	16
12	12	(Australia) Bob Jones	Ampol Max 3 Racing	Holden Commodore (VP)	16	+ 1:01.366	12
13	24	(Australia) Greg Crick	Pinnacle Motorsport	Holden Commodore (VP)	16	+ 1:10.059	13
14	47	(Australia) John Trimble	Daily Planet Racing	Holden Commodore (VP)	15	+ 1 lap	15
Ret	28	(Australia) Kevin Waldock	Playscape Racing	Ford Falcon (EB)	8	Retired	14
Ret	39	(Australia) Chris Smerdon	Challenge Motorsport	Holden Commodore (VP)	6	Retired	17
Ret	11	(Australia) Larry Perkins	Perkins Engineering	Holden Commodore (VP)	3	Accident	11

== Championship Standings ==
Drivers' Championship standings

Pos.	No.	Driver	Team	Points
1	2	(Australia) Mark Skaife	Gibson Motorsport	160
2	1	(Australia) Glenn Seton	Glenn Seton Racing	112
3	05	(Australia) Peter Brock	Holden Racing Team	104
4	18	(Australia) John Bowe	Dick Johnson Racing	62
5	6	(New Zealand) Jim Richards	Gibson Motorsport	58
