= 1994 ATCC Eastern Creek round =

(New South Wales) 1994 Eastern Creek ATCC round
Event Information
- Round 7 of 10 in the 1994 Australian Touring Car Championship
- Date: 3-5 June 1994
- Location: Eastern Creek, New South Wales
- Venue: Eastern Creek Raceway
- Weather: Fine

Results
Race 1
| Distance | 16 laps | 62 km |
| Pole position | Peter Brock; Holden Racing Team | 1:32.740 |
| Winner | Peter Brock; Holden Racing Team | |
Race 2
| Distance | 16 laps | 62 km |
| Winner | Peter Brock; Holden Racing Team | |
Round Results
| First | Peter Brock; Holden Racing Team | 40 pts |
| Second | Mark Skaife; Gibson Motorsport | 30 pts |
| Third | Alan Jones; Glenn Seton Racing | 22 pts |

The 1994 Eastern Creek ATCC round was the seventh round of the 1994 Australian Touring Car Championship. It was held on the weekend of 3 to 5 June at Eastern Creek Raceway in Eastern Creek, New South Wales.

== Race results ==
=== Qualifying ===
Peter Brock took pole position with a time of 1:32.740. This would be Brock's second pole position of the year. Wayne Gardner achieved his best qualifying result of the year with second.

| Pos. | No. | Name | Team | Car | Grid |
|---|---|---|---|---|---|
| 1 | 05 | (Australia) Peter Brock | Holden Racing Team | Holden Commodore (VP) | 1:32.740 |
| 2 | 4 | (Australia) Wayne Gardner | Wayne Gardner Racing | Holden Commodore (VP) | 1:32.950 |
| 3 | 18 | (Australia) John Bowe | Dick Johnson Racing | Ford Falcon (EB) | 1:33.300 |
| 4 | 2 | (Australia) Mark Skaife | Gibson Motorsport | Holden Commodore (VP) | 1:33.350 |
| 5 | 1 | (Australia) Glenn Seton | Glenn Seton Racing | Ford Falcon (EB) | 1:33.450 |
| 6 | 11 | (Australia) Larry Perkins | Perkins Engineering | Holden Commodore (VP) | 1:33.680 |
| 7 | 015 | (Australia) Tomas Mezera | Holden Racing Team | Holden Commodore (VP) | 1:33.680 |
| 8 | 17 | (Australia) Dick Johnson | Dick Johnson Racing | Ford Falcon (EB) | 1:33.700 |
| 9 | 7 | (Australia) Neil Crompton | Wayne Gardner Racing | Holden Commodore (VP) | 1:33.790 |
| 10 | 6 | (New Zealand) Jim Richards | Gibson Motorsport | Holden Commodore (VP) | 1:33.840 |
| 11 | 30 | (Australia) Alan Jones | Glenn Seton Racing | Ford Falcon (EB) | 1:34.080 |
| 12 | 23 | (Australia) Paul Morris | LoGaMo Racing | Holden Commodore (VP) | 1:34.200 |
| 13 | 25 | (Australia) Tony Longhurst | LoGaMo Racing | Holden Commodore (VP) | 1:35.010 |
| 14 | 24 | (Australia) Greg Crick | Pinnacle Motorsport | Holden Commodore (VP) | 1:35.750 |
| 15 | 33 | (Australia) Bob Pearson | Pro-Duct Motorsport | Holden Commodore (VP) | 1:36.010 |
| 16 | 27 | (Australia) Terry Finnigan | Terry Finnigan Racing | Holden Commodore (VP) | 1:36.440 |
| 17 | 3 | (Australia) Steve Reed | Lansvale Racing Team | Holden Commodore (VP) | 1:36.600 |
| 18 | 39 | (Australia) Chris Smerdon | Challenge Motorsport | Holden Commodore (VP) | 1:37.190 |
| 19 | 26 | (Australia) Don Watson | Don Watson Racing | Holden Commodore (VP) | 1:37.850 |
| 20 | 12 | (Australia) Bob Jones | Ampol Max 3 Racing | Holden Commodore (VP) | 1:38.540 |
| 21 | 20 | (Australia) Ian Palmer | Palmer Promotions | Holden Commodore (VP) | 1:39.120 |
| 22 | 16 | (Australia) Graham Blythman | Graham Blythman Racing | Holden Commodore (VP) | 1:39.240 |
| 23 | 41 | (Australia) Garry Willmington | Garry Willmington Performance | Ford Falcon (EB) | 1:41.280 |
| 24 | 47 | (Australia) John Trimble | Daily Planet Racing | Holden Commodore (VP) | 1:42.180 |
| 25 | 36 | (Australia) Neil Schembri | Schembri Motorsport | Holden Commodore (VP) | 1:44.020 |
| 26 | 42 | (Australia) Glenn Mason | Glenn Mason Racing | Holden Commodore (VL) SS Group A SV | 1:44.750 |
| 27 | 79 | (Australia) Mike Conway | Cadillac Productions | Holden Commodore (VL) SS Group A SV | 1:47.050 |

=== Race 1 ===
In a closely fought race, Peter Brock emerged victorious with a flag-to-flag victory. Early spins from John Bowe and Neil Crompton sent both tumbling down the pack. In a battle with Mark Skaife, Glenn Seton spun in turn two, causing him to beach on the inside curb, taking him out of the race. Brock rounded out the winner, with Skaife second and Perkins in third.

| Pos. | No. | Name | Team | Car | Laps | Time/Retired | Grid |
|---|---|---|---|---|---|---|---|
| 1 | 05 | (Australia) Peter Brock | Holden Racing Team | Holden Commodore (VP) | 16 | 25:33.5008 | 1 |
| 2 | 2 | (Australia) Mark Skaife | Gibson Motorsport | Holden Commodore (VP) | 16 | + 6.935 | 4 |
| 3 | 11 | (Australia) Larry Perkins | Perkins Engineering | Holden Commodore (VP) | 16 | + 8.840 | 6 |
| 4 | 4 | (Australia) Wayne Gardner | Wayne Gardner Racing | Holden Commodore (VP) | 16 | + 10.685 | 2 |
| 5 | 015 | (Australia) Tomas Mezera | Holden Racing Team | Holden Commodore (VP) | 16 | + 10.805 | 7 |
| 6 | 17 | (Australia) Dick Johnson | Dick Johnson Racing | Ford Falcon (EB) | 16 | + 13.325 | 8 |
| 7 | 30 | (Australia) Alan Jones | Glenn Seton Racing | Ford Falcon (EB) | 16 | + 17.803 | 11 |
| 8 | 6 | (New Zealand) Jim Richards | Gibson Motorsport | Holden Commodore (VP) | 16 | + 18.641 | 10 |
| 9 | 23 | (Australia) Paul Morris | LoGaMo Racing | Holden Commodore (VP) | 16 | + 21.468 | 12 |
| 10 | 18 | (Australia) John Bowe | Dick Johnson Racing | Ford Falcon (EB) | 16 | + 21.468 | 3 |
| 11 | 25 | (Australia) Tony Longhurst | LoGaMo Racing | Holden Commodore (VP) | 16 | + 30.443 | 13 |
| 12 | 24 | (Australia) Greg Crick | Pinnacle Motorsport | Holden Commodore (VP) | 16 | + 36.894 | 14 |
| 13 | 3 | (Australia) Steve Reed | Lansvale Racing Team | Holden Commodore (VP) | 16 | + 38.443 | 17 |
| 14 | 7 | (Australia) Neil Crompton | Wayne Gardner Racing | Holden Commodore (VP) | 16 | + 39.485 | 9 |
| 15 | 39 | (Australia) Chris Smerdon | Challenge Motorsport | Holden Commodore (VP) | 16 | + 58.702 | 18 |
| 16 | 12 | (Australia) Bob Jones | Ampol Max 3 Racing | Holden Commodore (VP) | 16 | + 59.397 | 20 |
| 17 | 26 | (Australia) Don Watson | Don Watson Racing | Holden Commodore (VP) | 16 | + 59.707 | 19 |
| 18 | 16 | (Australia) Graham Blythman | Graham Blythman Racing | Holden Commodore (VP) | 16 | + 1:31.763 | 22 |
| 19 | 47 | (Australia) John Trimble | Daily Planet Racing | Holden Commodore (VP) | 16 | + 1:37.116 | 24 |
| 20 | 20 | (Australia) Ian Palmer | Palmer Promotions | Holden Commodore (VP) | 16 | + 1:38.026 | 21 |
| 21 | 36 | (Australia) Neil Schembri | Schembri Motorsport | Holden Commodore (VP) | 15 | + 1 lap | 25 |
| 22 | 41 | (Australia) Garry Willmington | Garry Willmington Performance | Ford Falcon (EB) | 15 | + 1 lap | 23 |
| 23 | 42 | (Australia) Glenn Mason | Glenn Mason Racing | Holden Commodore (VL) SS Group A SV | 15 | + 1 lap | |
| 24 | 62 | (Australia) Wayne Russell | Novacastrian Motorsport | Holden Commodore (VL) SS Group A SV | 14 | + 2 laps | |
| Ret | 1 | (Australia) Glenn Seton | Glenn Seton Racing | Ford Falcon (EB) | 6 | Retired | 5 |
| Ret | 33 | (Australia) Bob Pearson | Pro-Duct Motorsport | Holden Commodore (VP) | 4 | Retired | 15 |
| Ret | 79 | (Australia) Mike Conway | Cadillac Productions | Holden Commodore (VL) SS Group A SV | 4 | Retired | |
| Ret | 27 | (Australia) Terry Finnigan | Terry Finnigan Racing | Holden Commodore (VP) | 1 | Retired | 16 |

=== Race 2 ===
Brock leaped off the line to an early lead, with Skaife and Perkins in hot pursuit. Down the pack, Seton was struggling to regain lost track position and spun again on turn two. Wayne Gardner would also spin out as well, sending him out of the top five. Alan Jones began to pressure Skaife for second before eventually passing him in his pursuit of Brock. Jones began to catch Brock, taking the gap down to 1.5 seconds. This didn't prove to be enough however, as Brock came through for the win and a clean sweep. Jones and Skaife rounded out the podium.

| Pos. | No. | Name | Team | Car | Laps | Time/Retired | Grid |
|---|---|---|---|---|---|---|---|
| 1 | 05 | (Australia) Peter Brock | Holden Racing Team | Holden Commodore (VP) | 15 | 23:58.4440 | 1 |
| 2 | 30 | (Australia) Alan Jones | Glenn Seton Racing | Ford EB Falcon | 15 | + 1.234 | 7 |
| 3 | 2 | (Australia) Mark Skaife | Gibson Motorsport | Holden Commodore (VP) | 15 | + 2.462 | 2 |
| 4 | 015 | (Australia) Tomas Mezera | Holden Racing Team | Holden Commodore (VP) | 15 | + 2.927 | 5 |
| 5 | 1 | (Australia) Glenn Seton | Glenn Seton Racing | Ford EB Falcon | 15 | + 11.386 | 23 |
| 6 | 18 | (Australia) John Bowe | Dick Johnson Racing | Ford EB Falcon | 15 | + 14.597 | 10 |
| 7 | 17 | (Australia) Dick Johnson | Dick Johnson Racing | Ford EB Falcon | 15 | + 16.939 | 6 |
| 8 | 6 | (New Zealand) Jim Richards | Gibson Motorsport | Holden Commodore (VP) | 15 | + 20.157 | 8 |
| 9 | 23 | (Australia) Paul Morris | LoGaMo Racing | Holden Commodore (VP) | 15 | + 20.930 | 9 |
| 10 | 25 | (Australia) Tony Longhurst | LoGaMo Racing | Holden Commodore (VP) | 15 | + 25.166 | 11 |
| 11 | 11 | (Australia) Larry Perkins | Perkins Engineering | Holden Commodore (VP) | 15 | + 26.741 | 3 |
| 12 | 7 | (Australia) Neil Crompton | Wayne Gardner Racing | Holden Commodore (VP) | 15 | + 36.059 | 14 |
| 13 | 3 | (Australia) Steve Reed | Lansvale Racing Team | Holden Commodore (VP) | 15 | + 38.204 | 13 |
| 14 | 4 | (Australia) Wayne Gardner | Wayne Gardner Racing | Holden Commodore (VP) | 15 | + 38.755 | 4 |
| 15 | 12 | (Australia) Bob Jones | Ampol Max 3 Racing | Holden Commodore (VP) | 15 | + 50.580 | 16 |
| 16 | 39 | (Australia) Chris Smerdon | Challenge Motorsport | Holden Commodore (VP) | 15 | + 1:01.174 | 15 |
| 17 | 26 | (Australia) Don Watson | Don Watson Racing | Holden Commodore (VP) | 15 | + 1:07.327 | 17 |
| 18 | 27 | (Australia) Terry Finnigan | Terry Finnigan Racing | Holden Commodore (VP) | 15 | + 1:10.669 | 24 |
| 19 | 33 | (Australia) Bob Pearson | Ampol Max 3 Racing | Holden Commodore (VP) | 15 | + 1:13.733 | 25 |
| 20 | 16 | (Australia) Graham Blythman | Graham Blythman Racing | Holden Commodore (VP) | 15 | + 1:29.690 | 18 |
| 21 | 20 | (Australia) Ian Palmer | Palmer Promotions | Holden Commodore (VP) | 15 | + 1:37.815 | 20 |
| 22 | 79 | (Australia) Mike Conway | Cadillac Productions | Holden Commodore (VL) SS Group A SV | 14 | + 1 lap | |
| 23 | 36 | (Australia) Neil Schembri | Schembri Motorsport | Holden Commodore (VP) | 14 | + 1 lap | 21 |
| 24 | 41 | (Australia) Garry Willmington | Garry Willmington Performance | Ford EB Falcon | 14 | + 1 lap | 22 |
| 25 | 47 | (Australia) John Trimble | Daily Planet Racing | Holden Commodore (VP) | 14 | + 1 lap | 19 |
| 26 | 62 | (Australia) Wayne Russell | Novacastrian Motorsport | Holden Commodore (VL) SS Group A SV | 13 | + 2 laps | |
| 27 | 42 | (Australia) Glenn Mason | Glenn Mason Racing | Holden Commodore (VL) SS Group A SV | 12 | + 3 laps | |
| Ret | 24 | (Australia) Greg Crick | Pinnacle Motorsport | Holden Commodore (VP) | 2 | Retired | 12 |
| WD | 79 | (Australia) Mike Conway | Cadillac Productions | Holden Commodore (VL) SS Group A SV | | Withdrew | |

== Championship Standings ==
Drivers' Championship standings

| Pos. | No. | Driver | Team | Points |
|---|---|---|---|---|
| 1 | 2 | (Australia) Mark Skaife | Gibson Motorsport | 244 |
| 2 | 1 | (Australia) Glenn Seton | Glenn Seton Racing | 169 |
| 3 | 05 | (Australia) Peter Brock | Holden Racing Team | 165 |
| 4 | 11 | (Australia) Larry Perkins | Perkins Engineering | 110 |
| 5 | 30 | (Australia) Alan Jones | Glenn Seton Racing | 104 |
