= Pinnacle Motorsport =

Pinnacle Motorsport may refer to:

- Pinnacle Motorsport (Australian auto racing team), defunct Australian motor racing team that competed in the Australian Touring Car Championship
- Pinnacle Motorsport (Filipino auto racing team), Irish-Filipino auto racing team competing in the F3 Asian Championship

== See also ==
- FILMAR Racing, a defunct American auto racing team briefly known as Pinnacle Motorsports or Pinnacle Motorsports Group that competed in the NASCAR Cup Series and associated series
