= 1994 ATCC Lakeside round =

(Queensland) 1994 Lakeside ATCC round
Event Information
- Round 5 of 10 in the 1994 Australian Touring Car Championship
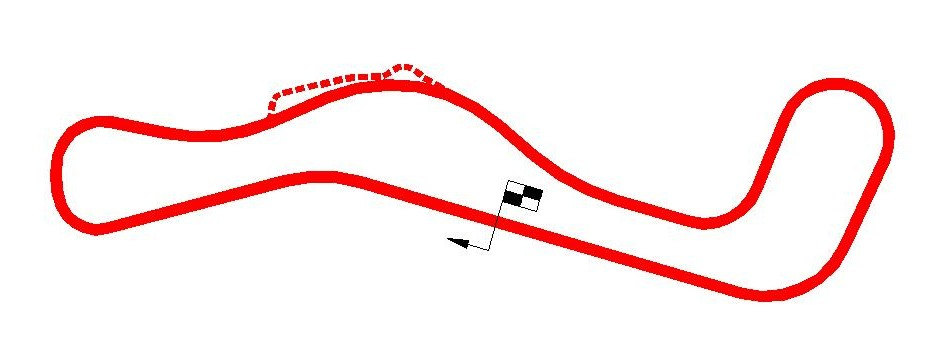
- Date: 22-24 April 1994
- Location: Brisbane, Queensland
- Venue: Lakeside International Raceway
- Weather: Fine

Results
Race 1
Distance	28 laps	67 km
Pole position	Glenn Seton; Glenn Seton Racing	0:52.060
Winner	Dick Johnson; Dick Johnson Racing	25:08.7886
Race 2
Distance	28 laps	67 km
Winner	Larry Perkins; Perkins Engineering	25:14.0837
Round Results
First	Larry Perkins; Perkins Engineering	36 pts
Second	Jim Richards; Gibson Motorsport	30 pts
Third	Mark Skaife; Gibson Motorsport	24 pts

The 1994 Lakeside ATCC round was the fifth round of the 1994 Australian Touring Car Championship. It was held on the weekend of 22 to 24 April at Lakeside International Raceway in Brisbane, Queensland.

The hometown hero Dick Johnson kicked the season off in fine style by winning the first race of the weekend. However, it would turn out to be a weekend of mixed fortunes for Dick Johnson Racing. Teammate Bowe retired from the first race after contact with Glenn Seton and Tomas Mezera. The second race saw multiple front-runners, including Johnson, retire after running afoul of a major oil spill at the final corner.

The second race of the weekend was won by Larry Perkins. This, coupled with the second-placing in the first race gifted Perkins the overall round victory while the Gibson Motorsport duo of Jim Richards and championship leader Mark Skaife rounded out the podium.

== Background ==
The event was held on the weekend of 22 to 24 April 1994. It was the 25th ATCC/V8 Supercar event to be held at Lakeside Raceway and consisted of two 28 lap races. The Dash for Cash sprint race used for the first four races of the season was discontinued ahead of the fifth round at Lakeside.

=== Entry list ===
A total of 20 drivers were entered into the weekend. With the exception of Kevin Heffernan who ran the Holden Commodore (VL) SS Group A SV, the grid comprised either of the VP Holden Commodore or the EB Ford Falcon.

== Race results ==
=== Qualifying ===
Peter Brock took his first pole position of the year and the second for the Holden Racing Team. Just one-tenth behind was John Bowe and two-tenths behind was team-mate, Tomas Mezera.

Pos.	No.	Name	Team	Car	Grid
1	1	(Australia) Glenn Seton	Glenn Seton Racing	Ford Falcon (EB)	0:52.060
2	17	(Australia) Dick Johnson	Dick Johnson Racing	Ford Falcon (EB)	0:52.070
3	05	(Australia) Peter Brock	Holden Racing Team	Holden Commodore (VP)	0:52.160
4	18	(Australia) John Bowe	Dick Johnson Racing	Ford Falcon (EB)	0:52.280
5	25	(Australia) Tony Longhurst	LoGaMo Racing	Holden Commodore (VP)	0:52.360
6	30	(Australia) Alan Jones	Alan Jones Racing	Ford Falcon (EB)	0:52.390
7	6	(New Zealand) Jim Richards	Gibson Motorsport	Holden Commodore (VP)	0:52.430
8	11	(Australia) Larry Perkins	Perkins Engineering	Holden Commodore (VP)	0:52.440
9	2	(Australia) Mark Skaife	Gibson Motorsport	Holden Commodore (VP)	0:52.480
10	23	(Australia) Paul Morris	LoGaMo Racing	Holden Commodore (VP)	0:52.490
11	015	(Australia) Tomas Mezera	Holden Racing Team	Holden Commodore (VP)	
12	4	(Australia) Wayne Gardner	Wayne Gardner Racing	Holden Commodore (VP)	
13	7	(Australia) Neil Crompton	Wayne Gardner Racing	Holden Commodore (VP)	
14	3	(Australia) Trevor Ashby	Lansvale Racing Team	Holden Commodore (VP)	
15	24	(Australia) Tony Scott	Pinnacle Motorsport	Holden Commodore (VP)	
16	12	(Australia) Bob Jones	Ampol Max 3 Racing	Holden Commodore (VP)	
17	28	(Australia) Kevin Waldock	Playscape Racing	Ford Falcon (EB)	
18	20	(Australia) Ian Palmer	Palmer Promotions	Holden Commodore (VP)	
19	32	(Australia) Kevin Heffernan	PACE Racing	Holden Commodore (VL) SS Group A SV	
20	36	(Australia) Neil Schembri	Schembri Motorsport	Holden Commodore (VP)	

=== Race 1 ===
A dramatic start to the first race saw Dick Johnson beating Glenn Seton off the start and a tangle between Brock and Longhurst, which subsequently led to their retirements from the race. With Longhurst blocking the circuit, the race was restarted. On the restart, Seton beat Johnson off the start, only to be passed by Johnson several laps later. As Seton started to struggle with tyres, a train of Bowe, Jones, and Perkins caught up with him. After trying to pass Seton down the bottom of the hill into the last corner, Bowe tagged the back of Seton, sending him into a spin. Bowe subsequently incurred damage, leading to a flat tyre. As he limped around the circuit, he was hit by Tomas Mezera on turn four. This catapulted Mezera into the guardrail, taking him out of the race and causing extensive damage to both cars. Up the front, it was a clean performance from Dick Johnson as he took his first race win of the season, with Perkins second and Jim Richards in third.

Pos.	No.	Name	Team	Car	Laps	Time/Retired	Grid
1	17	(Australia) Dick Johnson	Dick Johnson Racing	Ford Falcon (EB)	28	25:08.7886	2
2	11	(Australia) Larry Perkins	Perkins Engineering	Holden Commodore (VP)	28	+ 8.050	8
3	6	(New Zealand) Jim Richards	Gibson Motorsport	Holden Commodore (VP)	28	+ 19.896	7
4	2	(Australia) Mark Skaife	Gibson Motorsport	Holden Commodore (VP)	28	+ 24.066	9
5	3	(Australia) Trevor Ashby	Lansvale Racing Team	Holden Commodore (VP)	28	+ 24.370	14
6	4	(Australia) Wayne Gardner	Wayne Gardner Racing	Holden Commodore (VP)	28	+ 25.538	12
7	24	(Australia) Tony Scott	Pinnacle Motorsport	Holden Commodore (VP)	28	+ 26.923	
8	23	(Australia) Paul Morris	LoGaMo Racing	Holden Commodore (VP)	28	+ 29.086	10
9	7	(Australia) Neil Crompton	Wayne Gardner Racing	Holden Commodore (VP)	28	+ 30.753	13
10	30	(Australia) Alan Jones	Glenn Seton Racing	Ford Falcon (EB)	28	+ 41.104	6
11	12	(Australia) Bob Jones	Ampol Max 3 Racing	Holden Commodore (VP)	28	+ 41.274	
12	28	(Australia) Kevin Waldock	Playscape Racing	Ford Falcon (EB)	28	+ 41.865	17
13	1	(Australia) Glenn Seton	Glenn Seton Racing	Ford Falcon (EB)	27	+ 1 lap	1
14	20	(Australia) Ian Palmer	Palmer Promotions	Holden Commodore (VP)	26	+ 2 laps	
15	32	(Australia) Kevin Heffernan	PACE Racing	Holden Commodore (VL) SS Group A SV	26	+ 2 laps	19
16	36	(Australia) Neil Schembri	Schembri Motorsport	Holden Commodore (VP)	26	+ 2 laps	20
Ret	015	(Australia) Tomas Mezera	Holden Racing Team	Holden Commodore (VP)	15	Accident	11
Ret	18	(Australia) John Bowe	Dick Johnson Racing	Ford Falcon (EB)	15	Accident damage	4
Ret	05	(Australia) Peter Brock	Holden Racing Team	Holden Commodore (VP)	0	Accident	3
Ret	25	(Australia) Tony Longhurst	LoGaMo Racing	Holden Commodore (VP)	0	Accident	5

=== Race 2 ===
After bogging down at the start, Johnson wasted his front row start and found himself in fourth by the end of the first lap. After a couple of laps, Johnson began to climb back up the order and began to chase down race leader, Perkins. Toward the middle of the race, Neil Schembri blew his engine, laying down a trail of oil down the hill into the final corner. The smoke plume left meant that some of the leading drivers couldn't see the oil. The first driver to spin out was Dick Johnson, followed by Alan Jones, and finally Wayne Gardner. Toward the end of the race, Jim Richards began to rapidly close in on the back of Perkins. Though it proved not be enough. Perkins took the win, with Richards in second and Brock in third after a storming drive from the back of the grid.

Pos.	No.	Name	Team	Car	Laps	Time/Retired	Grid
1	11	(Australia) Larry Perkins	Perkins Engineering	Holden Commodore (VP)	28	25:14.0837	2
2	6	(New Zealand) Jim Richards	Gibson Motorsport	Holden Commodore (VP)	28	+ 0.124	3
3	05	(Australia) Peter Brock	Holden Racing Team	Holden Commodore (VP)	28	+ 0.870	18
4	2	(Australia) Mark Skaife	Gibson Motorsport	Holden Commodore (VP)	28	+ 12.811	4
5	23	(Australia) Paul Morris	LoGaMo Racing	Holden Commodore (VP)	28	+ 16.279	8
6	18	(Australia) John Bowe	Dick Johnson Racing	Ford Falcon (EB)	28	+ 16.375	17
7	3	(Australia) Trevor Ashby	Lansvale Racing Team	Holden Commodore (VP)	28	+ 22.422	5
8	1	(Australia) Glenn Seton	Glenn Seton Racing	Ford Falcon (EB)	28	+ 22.528	13
9	7	(Australia) Neil Crompton	Wayne Gardner Racing	Holden Commodore (VP)	28	+ 27.536	9
10	12	(Australia) Bob Jones	Ampol Max 3 Racing	Holden Commodore (VP)	28	+ 43.170	11
11	28	(Australia) Kevin Waldock	Playscape Racing	Ford Falcon (EB)	28	+ 43.524	12
12	25	(Australia) Tony Longhurst	LoGaMo Racing	Holden Commodore (VP)	28	+ 48.670	19
13	24	(Australia) Tony Scott	Pinnacle Motorsport	Holden Commodore (VP)	28	+ 50.218	7
14	20	(Australia) Ian Palmer	Palmer Promotions	Holden Commodore (VP)	26	+ 2 laps	14
15	32	(Australia) Kevin Heffernan	PACE Racing	Holden Commodore (VL) SS Group A SV	26	+ 2 laps	18
Ret	17	(Australia) Dick Johnson	Dick Johnson Racing	Ford Falcon (EB)	10	Accident	1
Ret	30	(Australia) Alan Jones	Glenn Seton Racing	Ford Falcon (EB)	10	Accident	10
Ret	4	(Australia) Wayne Gardner	Wayne Gardner Racing	Holden Commodore (VP)	10	Accident	6
Ret	36	(Australia) Neil Schembri	Schembri Motorsport	Holden Commodore (VP)	8	Engine	16
WD	015	(Australia) Tomas Mezera	Holden Racing Team	Holden Commodore (VP)		Withdrew	

== Championship standings ==
Drivers' Championship standings

Pos.	No.	Driver	Team	Points
1	2	(Australia) Mark Skaife	Gibson Motorsport	184
2	1	(Australia) Glenn Seton	Glenn Seton Racing	119
2	05	(Australia) Peter Brock	Holden Racing Team	119
4	6	(New Zealand) Jim Richards	Gibson Motorsport	88
5	11	(Australia) Larry Perkins	Perkins Engineering	77
