= 1994 ATCC Launceston round =

(Tasmania) 1994 ATCC Launceston round
Event Information
- Round 3 of 10 in the 1994 Australian Touring Car Championship
- Date: 11–13 March 1994
- Location: Launceston, Tasmania
- Venue: Symmons Plains Raceway
- Weather: Fine

Results
Race 1
Distance	20 laps	50 km
Pole position	Mark Skaife; Gibson Motorsport	
Winner	Mark Skaife; Gibson Motorsport	24:24.26
Race 2
Distance	26 laps	50 km
Winner	Mark Skaife; Gibson Motorsport	24:33.80
Round Results
First	Mark Skaife; Gibson Motorsport	43 pts
Second	Glenn Seton; Glenn Seton Racing	28 pts
Third	Peter Brock; Holden Racing Team	26 pts

The 1994 ATCC Launceston round was the third round of the 1994 Australian Touring Car Championship. It was held on the weekend of 11 to 13 March at Symmons Plains Raceway in Launceston, Tasmania.

Mark Skaife continued his dominant form exhibited in the opening two rounds at Amaroo Park and Sandown by way of claiming pole position, won the Peter Jackson Dash, won both races and secured overall round honours for the third weekend in succession. Defending champion Glenn Seton finished second overall for the round while Peter Brock rounded out the podium.

== Background ==
The event was held on the weekend of 11 to 13 March 1994. It was the 26th ATCC/V8 Supercar event to be held at Symmons Plains Raceway and consisted of two 20 lap races, as well as the three-lap Dash for Cash for the fastest six qualifiers. Starting positions for the "dash" were drawn at random. Results from the dash determined the first six positions on the starting grid for race one.

=== Entry list ===
A total of 16 drivers were entered into the event. With the exception of Alan Taylor driving a Holden Commodore (VL) SS Group A SV, every entrant competed in either a VP Holden Commodore or a EB Ford Falcon.

Greg Crick made his first appearance for 1994, replacing Tony Scott at Pinnacle Motorsport.

== Race results ==
=== Peter Jackson Dash ===
Mark Skaife would win his second Peter Jackson Dash with Glenn Seton in second and Larry Perkins in third.

Pos.	No.	Name	Team	Car	Grid
1	2	(Australia) Mark Skaife	Gibson Motorsport	Holden Commodore (VP)	1
2	1	(Australia) Glenn Seton	Glenn Seton Racing	Ford Falcon (EB)	2
3	11	(Australia) Larry Perkins	Perkins Engineering	Holden Commodore (VP)	4
4	30	(Australia) Alan Jones	Glenn Seton Racing	Ford Falcon (EB)	3
5	18	(Australia) John Bowe	Dick Johnson Racing	Ford Falcon (EB)	6
6	015	(Australia) Tomas Mezera	Holden Racing Team	Holden Commodore (VP)	5

=== Race 1 ===
Skaife once again led off the line with the two Peter Jackson Falcon's following suit. Wayne Gardner was out of the race early due to an oil pressure problem. Alan Jones soon developed a misfire and began to tumble down the pack. The race was otherwise uneventful with Skaife taking another dominant victory to continue his streak of race wins in 1994.

Pos.	No.	Name	Team	Car	Laps	Time/Retired	Grid
1	2	(Australia) Mark Skaife	Gibson Motorsport	Holden Commodore (VP)	26	24:24.26	1
2	1	(Australia) Glenn Seton	Glenn Seton Racing	Ford Falcon (EB)	26	+ 5.00	2
3	18	(Australia) John Bowe	Dick Johnson Racing	Ford Falcon (EB)	26	+ 5.69	5
4	05	(Australia) Peter Brock	Holden Racing Team	Holden Commodore (VP)	26	+ 6.07	
5	11	(Australia) Larry Perkins	Perkins Engineering	Holden Commodore (VP)	26	+ 8.97	3
6	015	(Australia) Tomas Mezera	Holden Racing Team	Holden Commodore (VP)	26	+ 12.99	6
7	7	(Australia) Neil Crompton	Wayne Gardner Racing	Holden Commodore (VP)	26	+ 14.42	
8	25	(Australia) Tony Longhurst	LoGaMo Racing	Holden Commodore (VP)	26	+ 14.42	
9	17	(Australia) Dick Johnson	Dick Johnson Racing	Ford Falcon (EB)	26	+ 18.20	
10	23	(Australia) Paul Morris	LoGaMo Racing	Holden Commodore (VP)	26	+ 23.58	
11	6	(New Zealand) Jim Richards	Gibson Motorsport	Holden Commodore (VP)	26	+ 24.02	
12	24	(Australia) Greg Crick	Pinnacle Motorsport	Holden Commodore (VP)	26	+ 45.49	
13	30	(Australia) Alan Jones	Glenn Seton Racing	Ford Falcon (EB)	26	+ 47.28	4
14	12	(Australia) Bob Jones	Ampol Max 3 Racing	Holden Commodore (VP)	26	+ 47.97	
15	37	(Australia) Alan Taylor	Scotty Taylor Racing	Holden Commodore (VL) SS Group A SV	18	+ 8 laps	
Ret	4	(Australia) Wayne Gardner	Wayne Gardner Racing	Holden Commodore (VP)	5	Retired	

=== Race 2 ===
It was another flag-to-flag victory for Mark Skaife as he claimed his sixth straight race win of the season. Close racing throughout the field led to an interesting race. Although, for John Bowe, the race was short lived as he retired from the race with gearbox problems. Tony Longhurst would get his best result of the season with second and Peter Brock in third after a race-long battle with Larry Perkins.

Pos.	No.	Name	Team	Car	Laps	Time/Retired	Grid
1	2	(Australia) Mark Skaife	Gibson Motorsport	Holden Commodore (VP)	26	24:33.80	1
2	25	(Australia) Tony Longhurst	LoGaMo Racing	Holden Commodore (VP)	26	+ 14.23	8
3	05	(Australia) Peter Brock	Holden Racing Team	Holden Commodore (VP)	26	+ 14.80	4
4	6	(New Zealand) Jim Richards	Gibson Motorsport	Holden Commodore (VP)	26	+ 15.17	11
5	1	(Australia) Glenn Seton	Glenn Seton Racing	Ford Falcon (EB)	26	+ 18.29	2
6	23	(Australia) Paul Morris	LoGaMo Racing	Holden Commodore (VP)	26	+ 19.75	10
7	30	(Australia) Alan Jones	Alan Jones Racing	Ford Falcon (EB)	26	+ 22.79	13
8	4	(Australia) Wayne Gardner	Wayne Gardner Racing	Holden Commodore (VP)	26	+ 23.52	16
9	11	(Australia) Larry Perkins	Perkins Engineering	Holden Commodore (VP)	26	+ 25.48	5
10	17	(Australia) Dick Johnson	Dick Johnson Racing	Ford Falcon (EB)	26	+ 34.80	9
11	24	(Australia) Greg Crick	Pinnacle Motorsport	Holden Commodore (VP)	26	+ 54.69	12
12	015	(Australia) Tomas Mezera	Holden Racing Team	Holden Commodore (VP)	25	+ 1 lap	6
13	7	(Australia) Neil Crompton	Wayne Gardner Racing	Holden Commodore (VP)	25	+ 1 lap	7
14	12	(Australia) Bob Jones	Ampol Max 3 Racing	Holden Commodore (VP)	25	+ 1 lap	14
15	37	(Australia) Alan Taylor	Scotty Taylor Racing	Holden Commodore (VL) SS Group A SV	22	+ 4 laps	15
Ret	18	(Australia) John Bowe	Dick Johnson Racing	Ford Falcon (EB)	9	Retired	12

== Championship Standings ==
Drivers' Championship standings

Pos.	No.	Driver	Team	Points
1	2	(Australia) Mark Skaife	Gibson Motorsport	129
2	05	(Australia) Peter Brock	Holden Racing Team	73
3	1	(Australia) Glenn Seton	Glenn Seton Racing	72
4	6	(New Zealand) Jim Richards	Gibson Motorsport	48
5	18	(Australia) John Bowe	Dick Johnson Racing	46
