= Glenn Seton =

Australian racing driver (born 1965)

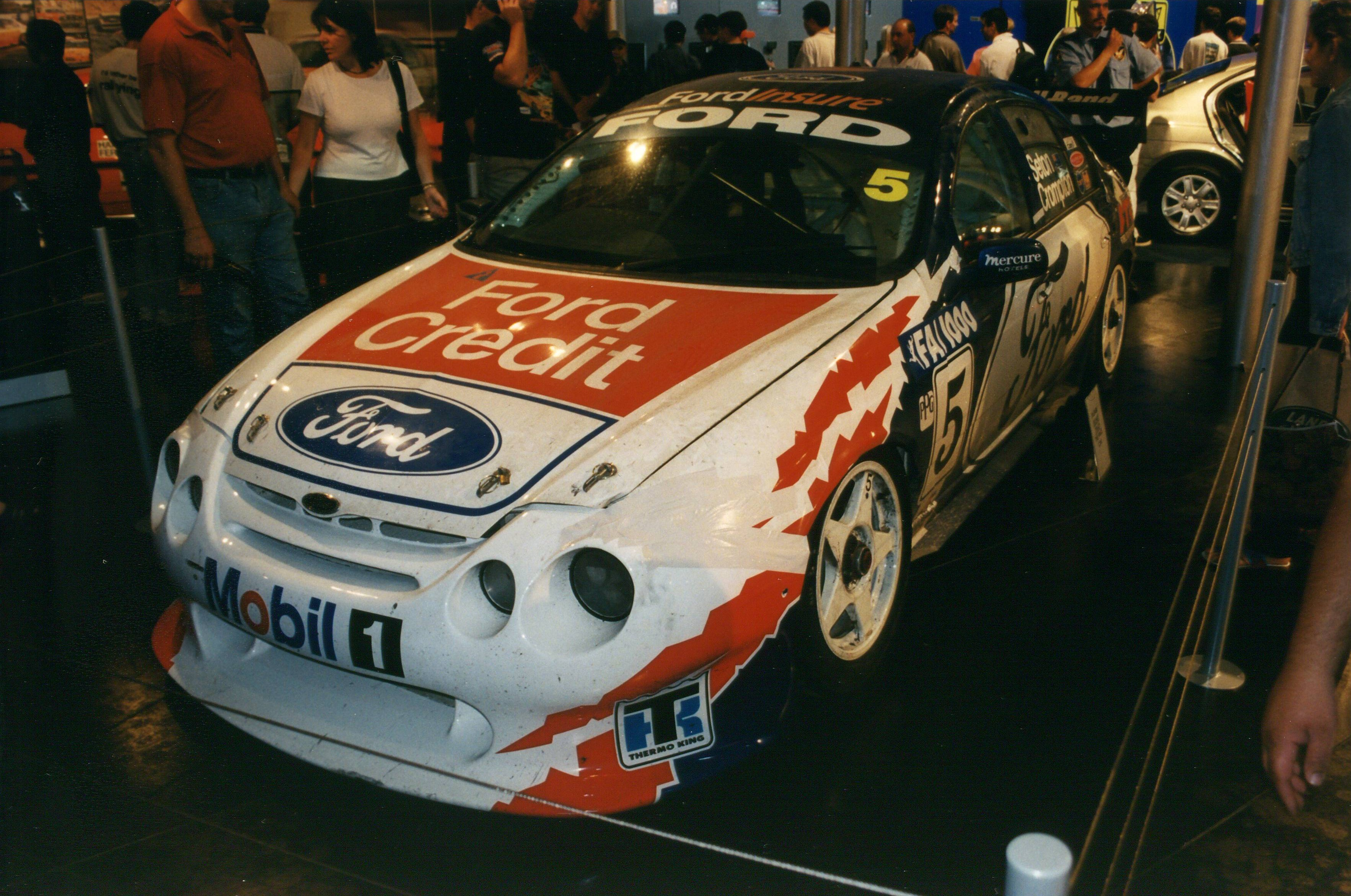
- Nationality: Australian
- Born: Glenn Michael Seton; 5 May 1965 (age 61) Gosford, New South Wales, Australia

Supercars Championship career
- Championships: 2 (1993, 1997)
- Races: 209
- Wins: 40
- Podiums: 104
- Pole positions: 16

Glenn Michael Seton (born 5 May 1965) is an Australian racing driver. He won the Australian Touring Car Championship in 1993 and 1997 while driving for his own team. Although he never won the Bathurst 1000 like his father Barry did in 1965, Glenn started from pole position in 1994 and 1996, and finished second three times. He came close to winning the race in 1995, holding a significant lead in the closing stages, but his engine failed nine laps from the finish.

== Career ==
=== Early career ===
Growing up in south-west Sydney, Seton had a successful karting career before switching to cars after a heavy crash at Oran Park Raceway aged 17. He then raced for his father Barry's team in 1983, driving a Ford Capri and making his Bathurst 1000 debut in 1983 with Barry, better known as Bo. Seton then competed in three rounds of the 1984 Australian Touring Car Championship in the car.

=== Nissan Motorsport ===
Seton then moved to Nissan Motorsport from the 1984 Australian Endurance Championship and would remain with the team until the end of 1988. Father Barry also joined the team as engine builder. Glenn would first drive in a Nissan Pulsar EXA in the 1984 Castrol 500 at Sandown in Melbourne, and then at the 1984 James Hardie 1000, both times alongside Christine Gibson, the wife of his future boss Fred Gibson. In 1986, he would win his first major race, the Sandown 500 driving with George Fury.

Seton's best individual year with Nissan came in 1987 driving the Nissan Skyline RS DR30 when he would finish second behind Jim Richards in the ATCC, only losing the championship after falling behind Richards in the final race at Oran Park Raceway. Teamed with John Bowe, Seton would then finish second in the 1987 James Hardie 1000 which that year was part of the inaugural World Touring Car Championship. Seton, who had driven a memorable stint on slick tyres in wet conditions, and Bowe were in a strong position behind the later-disqualified Eggenberger Motorsport Ford Sierra RS500s until a safety car delayed them. Post-season, Seton also competed at Suzuka Circuit in the final round of the 1987 Japanese Touring Car Championship with Anders Olofsson, finishing in fourth place. It was Seton's only major race outside Australasia.

1988 would be a frustrating year for Seton. Nissan introduced the new Skyline HR31 GTS-R, and with the car arriving only mid-season, the team could not get on terms with the much more powerful Ford Sierras. The cars initial unreliability saw Seton's Skyline retire from the first lap at both the Sandown 500 and Tooheys 1000, both times when the cars production-based gearbox failed.

=== Glenn Seton Racing ===
Following this, Seton and his father Bo left the Nissan team at the end of 1988 to set up Glenn Seton Racing, which ran from 1989 to 2002, initially with Ford Sierra RS500s. The team wrote off its only car in the team's third round at Lakeside International Raceway in 1989, forcing the team to miss the next two rounds. In this Group A Sierra period, in which Seton retained the Peter Jackson title sponsorship from the Nissan days, Seton would only win one championship round, at Symmons Plains Raceway in 1992. In addition to this, Seton reunited with George Fury to win the 1990 Sandown 500 which contributed to winning the 1990 Australian Endurance Championship.

Approaching the new Group 3A regulations developed for 1993, GSR was one of the teams to develop a new V8 engine Ford Falcon (EB). The team ran the Falcons at the season-ending endurance races in 1992, where Seton became the first driver to put a Falcon into the top-ten qualifiers at Bathurst since 1984. The move to the new V8 formula would prove fruitful for Seton, winning the 1993 and 1997 Australian Touring Car Championships. In this period from 1993 to 1997, Seton finished in the top three of the championship in each year. This was despite the team's level of funding and resources dropping significantly from 1996 following the end of tobacco sponsorship in Australia.

Despite his consistent success in the championship, success at Bathurst would continue to elude Seton in this period. Seton did claim pole position at Bathurst in 1994 and 1996, however was regularly hampered by reliability issues on race day. Most infamously, Seton was leading the 1995 Bathurst 1000 until the final ten laps when an engine failure caused him to retire from the race. The race held extra importance for Seton as it was thirty years after father Bo's Bathurst victory, Seton himself was 30 years of age and was running in car number 30. A promotional offer would have given Seton the choice between $30,000 or his father's Bathurst winning car should he have won the race.

Between 1999 and 2001, the team received increased funding from Ford Australia and was rebranded as Ford Tickford Racing. The team ran two cars in this period, first for Neil Crompton and then for Steven Richards but had limited success on track. Seton won his final solo championship race at Winton Motor Raceway in 2000, only losing the overall round victory after slipping off the track on oil in the final race. Seton missed the Sandown round in 2000 after a testing crash at Phillip Island, however still finished fifth in the championship, before dropping to 16th in 2001. The team downsized to one car in 2002 and lost the Tickford association, running with Ford Credit title sponsorship, who had backed Seton since 1996.

=== Ford Performance Racing ===
At the end of 2002, Seton sold the team to Prodrive and the team name was renamed to Ford Performance Racing with Seton remaining with the team as a driver. The team would run three cars in 2003 with Craig Lowndes and David Besnard joining the team, with Lowndes and Seton combining for a second-place finish at the 2003 Bathurst 1000. With Seton only being promoted to the 1987 podium after the later disqualifications, this was Seton's first time appearing on the Bathurst podium. In 2004, the team suffered a spate of engine failures and Seton would only finish 15th in the championship, five spots ahead of Lowndes. Despite this, Seton and Lowndes would repeat their 2003 runner-up finish at the 2004 Bathurst 1000, in what were Seton's only two podiums in his two-year stint with the team.

=== Dick Johnson Racing ===
In 2005, Seton moved to Dick Johnson Racing a team with whom he had a long rivalry with through the 1990s. In late 2005 after a disappointing season, Seton was sacked from Dick Johnson Racing halfway through his two-year contract and replaced by Will Davison for 2006.

=== Endurance co-driver ===
Seton was not able to find a 2006 full-time drive, so he joined Stone Brothers Racing for the two V8 Supercar endurance races with James Courtney. Brake issues hampered the #4 SBR Falcon at Sandown where it finished ninth. At Bathurst, they finished third, Seton's third podium in four years at the event.

Seton moved from Ford and joined his childhood friend, and old Nissan teammate, Mark Skaife's Holden Racing Team squad in the 2007 and 2008 endurance races. This marked the first times in Seton's career to drive a Holden. He finished 13th in the Sandown 500 with Tony Longhurst and 11th in the Bathurst 1000 with Nathan Pretty. Seton again joined the Holden Racing Team in 2008, driving the #2 car with Craig Baird. The pair came 14th at the Phillip Island 500 and were running strongly at the Bathurst 1000 until a late race clash with Warren Luff put them out of the race. He made his final Bathurst appearance with Jason Bargwanna for Kelly Racing in 2010.

=== Later career ===
After retiring from full-time driving, Seton completed in multiple seasons of Touring Car Masters, including finally winning his first race victory at Bathurst in 2011. Seton would also finish second in class at the 2017 Liqui Moly Bathurst 12 Hour driving with son Aaron.

Seton is currently involved in the Australian Speedway scene and has travelled to the US with 2007/08 and 2009/10 Australian Super Sedan Champion, Jamie McHugh.

In 2013, Seton won the 2013 Great Southern 4 Hour, sharing a Mitsubishi Lancer Evo 10 with Bob Pearson.

== Personal life ==
Seton, with ex-wife Jayne, is father of Courtney and Aaron Seton, the latter of whom has also embarked on a racing career and now works as a mechanic for Dick Johnson Racing. Seton grew up in Moorebank in south-west Sydney before moving to Melbourne to work on the Nissan programme with his father. Seton would later move to the Gold Coast in 2004 where he currently resides.

== Career results ==
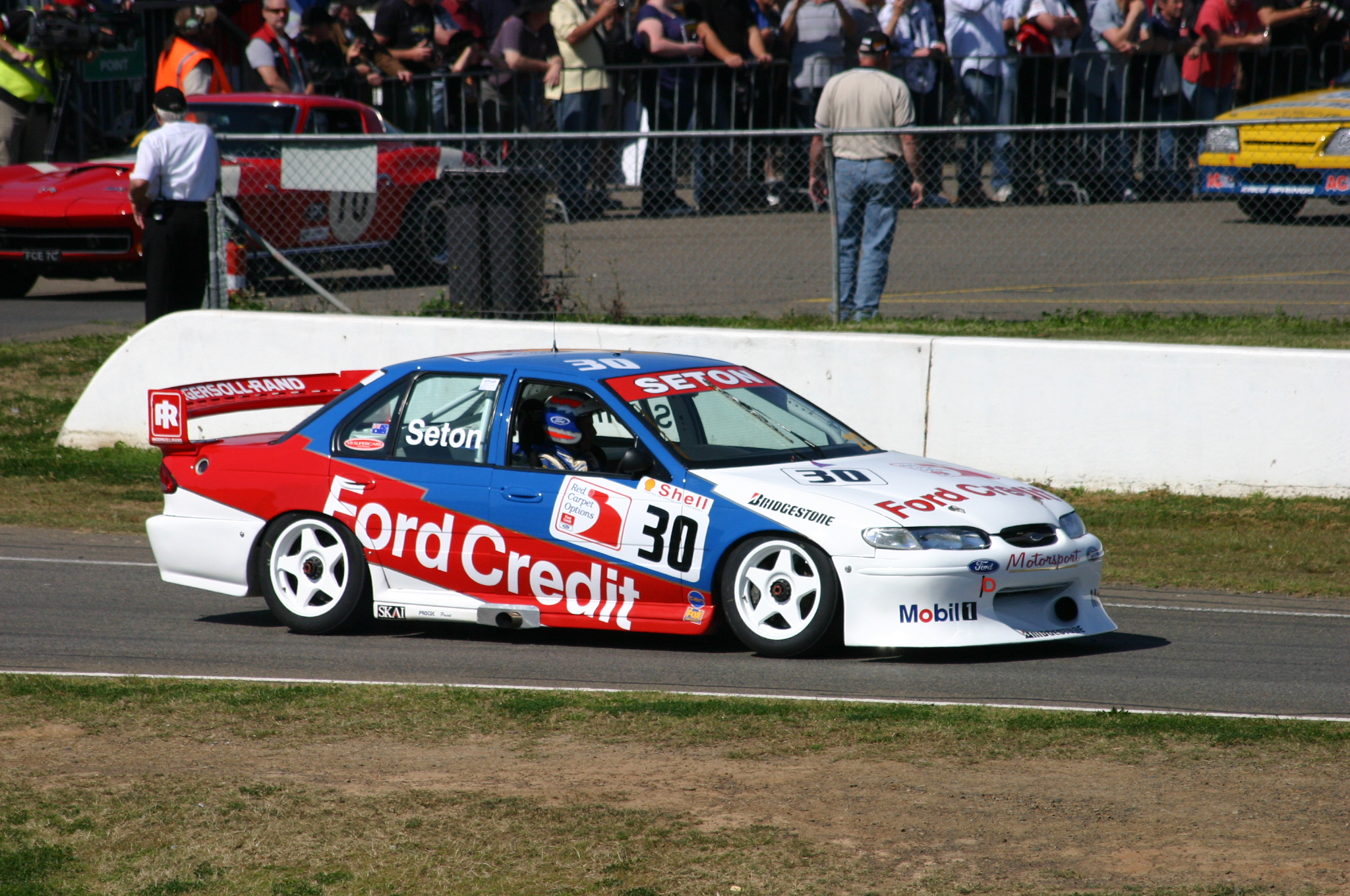
The Ford Falcon (EL) in which Seton won the 1997 Australian Touring Car Championship

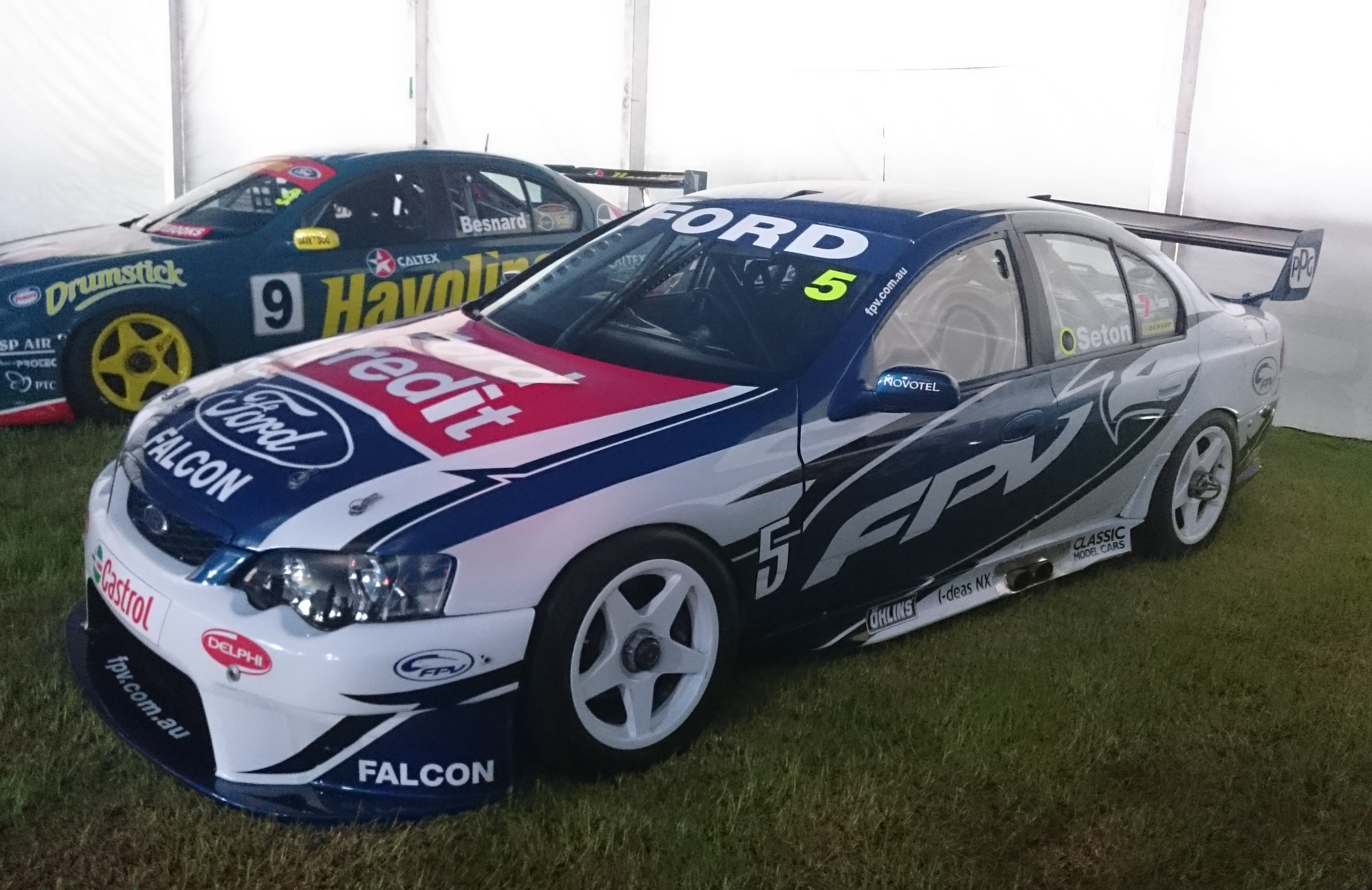
The Ford Falcon (BA) in which Seton contested the 2004 V8 Supercar Championship Series for Ford Performance Racing. Pictured in 2018

Season	Series	Position	Car	Team
1984	Australian Touring Car Championship	13th	Ford Capri Mk.III	Barry Seton
1986	Australian Touring Car Championship	10th	Nissan Skyline DR30 RS	Peter Jackson Nissan Racing
1986	Australian Endurance Championship	12th	Nissan Skyline DR30 RS	Peter Jackson Nissan Racing
1986	South Pacific Touring Car Championship	8th	Nissan Skyline DR30 RS	Peter Jackson Nissan Racing
1987	Australian Touring Car Championship	**2nd**	Nissan Skyline DR30 RS	Peter Jackson Nissan Racing
1988	Australian Touring Car Championship	14th	Nissan Skyline HR31 GTS-R	Peter Jackson Nissan Racing
1988	Australian Drivers' Championship	14th	Ralt RT4 Nissan	Dave Thompson
1989	Australian Touring Car Championship	7th	Ford Sierra RS500	Glenn Seton Racing
1990	Australian Touring Car Championship	7th	Ford Sierra RS500	Glenn Seton Racing
1990	Australian Endurance Championship	**1st**	Ford Sierra RS500	Glenn Seton Racing
1991	Australian Touring Car Championship	4th	Ford Sierra RS500	Glenn Seton Racing
1992	Australian Touring Car Championship	5th	Ford Sierra RS500	Glenn Seton Racing
1993	Australian Touring Car Championship	**1st**	Ford Falcon EB	Glenn Seton Racing
1994	Australian Touring Car Championship	**2nd**	Ford Falcon EB	Glenn Seton Racing
1995	Australian Touring Car Championship	**2nd**	Ford Falcon EF	Glenn Seton Racing
1996	Australian Touring Car Championship	**3rd**	Ford Falcon EF	Glenn Seton Racing
1997	Australian Touring Car Championship	**1st**	Ford Falcon EL	Glenn Seton Racing
1998	Australian Touring Car Championship	6th	Ford Falcon EL	Glenn Seton Racing
1999	Shell Championship Series	4th	Ford Falcon AU	Glenn Seton Racing
2000	Shell Championship Series	5th	Ford Falcon AU	Glenn Seton Racing
2001	Shell Championship Series	16th	Ford Falcon AU	Glenn Seton Racing
2002	V8 Supercar Championship Series	24th	Ford Falcon (AU)	Glenn Seton Racing
2003	V8 Supercar Championship Series	15th	Ford Falcon (AU); Ford Falcon BA	Ford Performance Racing
2004	V8 Supercar Championship Series	15th	Ford Falcon BA	Ford Performance Racing
2005	V8 Supercar Championship Series	15th	Ford Falcon BA	Dick Johnson Racing
2006	V8 Supercar Championship Series	35th	Ford Falcon BA	Stone Brothers Racing
2007	V8 Supercar Championship Series	38th	Holden Commodore VE	Holden Racing Team
2008	V8 Supercar Championship Series	52nd	Holden Commodore VE	Holden Racing Team
2010	V8 Supercar Championship Series	61st	Holden Commodore VE	Kelly Racing
2010	Australian Mini Challenge	6th	Mini John Cooper Works Challenge	Pizza Capers
2011	Touring Car Masters (Class C)	11th	Ford XB Falcon GT Hardtop	Speed FX Racing
2012	Australian Touring Car Masters Series (Class A)	27th	Ford XY Falcon GTHO	Falcon Fire Protection
2013	Australian Production Car Championship	5th	Mitsubishi Lancer Evo X	Pro-Duct Racing
2013	Touring Car Masters	26th	Ford XY Falcon GT	Falcon Fire Protection
2015	Touring Car Masters (Pro Masters Class)	7th	Ford Mustang	Thunder Road Racing Australia

=== Supercars Championship results ===
(Races in bold indicate pole position) (Races in italics indicate fastest lap)

Supercars results
Year	Team	Car	1	2	3	4	5	6	7	8	9	10	11	12	13	14	15	16	17	18	19	20	21	22	23	24	25	26	27	28	29	30	31	32	33	34	35	36	37	38	39	Position	Points
1984	Barry Seton	Ford Capri Mk.III	SAN; R1	SYM; R2	BAR; R3	SUR; R4; 16	ORA; R5; 13	LAK; R6; 12	ADE; R7																																	13th	25
1986	Peter Jackson Nissan Racing	Nissan Skyline DR30 RS	AMA; R1	SYM; R2	SAN; R3; 14	ADE; R4; Ret	BAR; R5; 2	SUR; R6; 13	CAL; R7; 2	LAK; R8	WIN; R9	ORA; R10																														10th	67
1987	Peter Jackson Nissan Racing	Nissan Skyline DR30 RS	CAL; R1; 1	SYM; R2; 4	**LAK**; **R3**; **2**	BAR; R4; 1	ADE; R5; Ret	SUR; R6; 3	CAL; R7; 1	AMA; R8; 3	ORA; R9; Ret																															2nd	167
1988	Peter Jackson Nissan Racing	Nissan Skyline DR30 RS	CAL; R1	SYM; R2	WIN; R3	BAR; R4	ADE; R5	SUR; R6; Ret	CAL; R7	AMA; R8; Ret	ORA; R9; 6																															15th	6
1989	Peter Jackson Racing	Ford Sierra RS500	AMA; R1; 5	SYM; R2; 4	LAK; R3; Ret	BAR; R4	MAL; R5	SAN; R6; Ret	WIN; R7; Ret	ORA; R8; 4																																7th	28
1990	Peter Jackson Racing	Ford Sierra RS500	AMA; R1; 12	SYM; R2; 4	PHI; R3; Ret	WIN; R4; 4	LAK; R5; 9	MAL; R6; Ret	WAN; R7; 2	ORA; R8; Ret																																7th	37
1991	Peter Jackson Racing	Ford Sierra RS500	SAN; R1; Ret	SYM; R2; 3	WAN; R3; 4	LAK; R4; 4	WIN; R5; 3	AMA; R6; 12	MAL; R7; 5	LAK; R8; 5	ORA; R9; 4																															4th	70
1992	Peter Jackson Racing	Ford Sierra RS500	AMA; R1; 2	AMA; R2; 7	SAN; R3; 5	SAN; R4; 11	SYM; R5; 1	**SYM**; **R6**; **1**	WIN; R7; 3	WIN; R8; 4	LAK; R9; 7	LAK; R10; 11	EAS; R11; 8	EAS; R12; 4	MAL; R13; 6	MAL; R14; 6	WAN; R15; 4	WAN; R16; 6	ORA; R17; 5	ORA; R18; 13																						5th	173
1993	Peter Jackson Racing	Ford EB Falcon	AMA; R1; 3	AMA; R2; 4	SYM; R3; 3	SYM; R4; Ret	PHI; R5; 1	**PHI**; **R6**; **1**	LAK; R7; 5	LAK; R8; 4	**WIN**; **R9**; **1**	**WIN**; **R10**; **1**	**EAS**; **R11**; **1**	**EAS**; **R12**; **1**	**MAL**; **R13**; **2**	MAL; R14; 1	WAN; R15; 6	WAN; R15; Ret	ORA; R18; 4	ORA; R18; 4																						1st	191
1994	Peter Jackson Racing	Ford EB Falcon	AMA; R1; 2	AMA; R2; 2	SAN; R3; 4	SAN; R4; 17	SYM; R5; 2	SYM; R6; 5	PHI; R7; 1	**PHI**; **R8**; **1**	LAK; R9; 13	LAK; R10; 8	**WIN**; **R11**; **1**	**WIN**; **R12**; **1**	EAS; R13; Ret	EAS; R14; 5	MAL; R15; 4	MAL; R15; Ret	BAR; R18; Ret	BAR; R18; DNS	**ORA**; **R19**; **1**	**ORA**; **R20**; **1**																				2nd	228
1995	Peter Jackson Racing	Ford EF Falcon	SAN; R1; 10	SAN; R2; Ret	SYM; R3; 3	SYM; R4; Ret	BAT; R5; 3	BAT; R6; 5	**PHI**; **R7**; **3**	PHI; R8; 1	LAK; R9; 2	LAK; R10; 1	WIN; R11; 2	WIN; R12; 3	EAS; R13; 1	**EAS**; **R14**; **Ret**	MAL; R15; 1	**MAL**; **R16**; **1**	BAR; R17; 1	**BAR**; **R18**; **1**	ORA; R19; 2	ORA; R20; 2																				2nd	287
1996	Ford Credit Racing	Ford EF Falcon	EAS; R1; 3	EAS; R2; 20	EAS; R3; 3	SAN; R4; 6	SAN; R5; 2	SAN; R6; 1	BAT; R7; 5	BAT; R8; Ret	BAT; R9; 5	SYM; R10; 7	SYM; R11; 4	SYM; R12; 3	PHI; R13; 10	PHI; R14; 2	PHI; R15; 1	CAL; R16; Ret	CAL; R17; 5	CAL; R18; 1	LAK; R19; 4	LAK; R20; 3	LAK; R21; 10	BAR; R22; 4	BAR; R23; 3	BAR; R24; 2	MAL; R25; Ret	MAL; R26; 8	MAL; R27; Ret	ORA; R28; 3	ORA; R29; 3	ORA; R30; 2										3rd	308
1997	Ford Credit Racing	Ford EL Falcon	CAL; R1; 3	CAL; R2; 2	CAL; R3; 1	**PHI**; **R4**; **1**	**PHI**; **R5**; **3**	PHI; R6; Ret	SAN; R7; 1	**SAN**; **R8**; **1**	**SAN**; **R9**; **1**	SYM; R10; 4	SYM; R11; 3	SYM; R12; 3	WIN; R13; 4	WIN; R14; 4	WIN; R15; 3	**EAS**; **R16**; **1**	**EAS**; **R17**; **1**	**EAS**; **R18**; **1**	LAK; R19; 1	**LAK**; **R20**; **Ret**	LAK; R21; DNS	BAR; R22; 8	BAR; R23; 8	BAR; R24; 7	MAL; R25; 3	MAL; R26; 3	MAL; R27; 4	ORA; R28; 4	ORA; R29; 5	ORA; R30; 1										1st	668
1998	Ford Credit Racing	Ford EL Falcon	SAN; R1; 3	SAN; R2; 3	SAN; R3; 3	SYM; R4; 1	SYM; R5; Ret	SYM; R6; 5	LAK; R7; 16	LAK; R8; Ret	LAK; R9; 18	PHI; R10; 4	PHI; R11; 4	PHI; R12; 8	WIN; R13; 11	WIN; R14; 14	WIN; R15; 9	MAL; R16; 7	MAL; R17; 4	MAL; R18; 3	BAR; R19; 6	BAR; R20; 7	BAR; R21; 19	**CAL**; **R22**; **5**	CAL; R23; 6	CAL; R24; C	HDV; R25; 9	HDV; R26; 5	HDV; R27; 3	ORA; R28; 5	ORA; R29; 5	ORA; R30; Ret										6th	676
1999	Ford Tickford Racing	Ford AU Falcon	EAS; R1; 5	EAS; R2; 7	EAS; R3; 4	ADE; R4; 9	BAR; R5; 3	BAR; R6; 2	BAR; R7; 2	PHI; R8; 4	PHI; R9; 3	PHI; R10; 3	HDV; R11; 2	HDV; R12; 4	HDV; R13; 21	SAN; R14; 6	SAN; R15; 5	SAN; R16; 7	QLD; R17; Ret	QLD; R18; 17	QLD; R19; 9	CAL; R20; 9	CAL; R21; 5	CAL; R22; 4	SYM; R23; 10	SYM; R24; 6	SYM; R25; 4	WIN; R26; Ret	WIN; R27; DNS	WIN; R28; DNS	ORA; R29; 9	ORA; R30; 16	ORA; R31; 11	QLD; R32; 4	BAT; R33; 5							3rd	1656
2000	Ford Tickford Racing	Ford AU Falcon	PHI; R1; 6	PHI; R2; 4	BAR; R3; 16	BAR; R4; 16	BAR; R5; 19	ADE; R6; 2	ADE; R7; 7	EAS; R8; 6	EAS; R9; 5	EAS; R10; 3	HDV; R11; 3	HDV; R12; 3	HDV; R13; 4	CAN; R14; 12	CAN; R15; 8	CAN; R16; 3	QLD; R17; 8	QLD; R18; 8	QLD; R19; 6	**WIN**; **R20**; 2	WIN; R21; 1	WIN; R22; 16	ORA; R23; 4	ORA; R24; 5	ORA; R25; 3	CAL; R26; 8	CAL; R27; Ret	CAL; R28; 14	QLD; R29; 7	SAN; R30	SAN; R31	SAN; R32	BAT; R33; 13							5th	1133
2001	Ford Tickford Racing	Ford AU Falcon	PHI; R1; 10	PHI; R2; 10	ADE; R3; Ret	ADE; R4; 4	EAS; R5; 17	EAS; R6; 7	HDV; R7; 27	HDV; R8; 10	HDV; R9; 5	CAN; R10; 5	CAN; R11; 13	CAN; R12; 19	BAR; R13; 4	BAR; R14; 30	BAR; R15; Ret	CAL; R16; 19	CAL; R17; 25	CAL; R18; 16	ORA; R19; 11	ORA; R20; 15	QLD; R21; Ret	WIN; R22; Ret	WIN; R23; 10	BAT; R24; 9	PUK; R25; Ret	PUK; R26; 14	PUK; R27; 13	SAN; R28; 7	SAN; R29; 17	SAN; R30; Ret										16th	1800
2002	Glenn Seton Racing	Ford AU Falcon	ADE; R1; 18	ADE; R2; Ret	PHI; R3; 10	PHI; R4; 8	EAS; R5; 16	EAS; R6; 15	EAS; R7; Ret	HDV; R8; 10	HDV; R9; 11	HDV; R10; 11	CAN; R11; 14	CAN; R12; Ret	CAN; R13; Ret	BAR; R14; 22	BAR; R15; 18	BAR; R16; 21	ORA; R17; 9	ORA; R18; 13	WIN; R19; 26	WIN; R20; 21	QLD; R21; Ret	BAT; R22; Ret	SUR; R23; 28	SUR; R24; 21	PUK; R25; 26	PUK; R26; 24	PUK; R27; 17	SAN; R28; 22	SAN; R29; 12											24th	418
2003	Ford Performance Racing	Ford BA Falcon	ADE; R1; 18	ADE; R1; 10	PHI; R3; 9	EAS; R4; 26	WIN; R5; 12	BAR; R6; 14	BAR; R7; 15	BAR; R8; 18	HDV; R9; Ret	HDV; R10; 16	HDV; R11; 17	QLD; R12; Ret	ORA; R13; Ret	SAN; R14; 16	BAT; R15; 2	SUR; R16; 12	SUR; R17; 5	PUK; R18; 11	PUK; R19; 9	PUK; R20; 11	EAS; R21; 18	EAS; R22; Ret																		15th	1266
2004	Ford Performance Racing	Ford BA Falcon	ADE; R1; 10	ADE; R2; Ret	EAS; R3; 15	PUK; R4; 29	PUK; R5; 21	PUK; R6; 22	HDV; R7; 18	HDV; R8; 12	HDV; R9; 14	BAR; R10; Ret	BAR; R11; 21	BAR; R12; Ret	QLD; R13; 13	WIN; R14; 10	ORA; R15; DNS	ORA; R16; 21	SAN; R17; 18	BAT; R18; 2	SUR; R19; 15	SUR; R20; 19	SYM; R21; 28	SYM; R22; 19	SYM; R23; 17	EAS; R24; 14	EAS; R25; 13	EAS; R26; 22														15th	1237
2005	Dick Johnson Racing	Ford BA Falcon	ADE; R1; 9	ADE; R2; 25	PUK; R3; 26	PUK; R4; 13	PUK; R5; 12	BAR; R6; 12	BAR; R7; 15	BAR; R8; 9	EAS; R9; 20	EAS; R10; 27	SHA; R11; 14	SHA; R12; 7	SHA; R13; 24	HDV; R14; 8	HDV; R15; 7	HDV; R16; 5	QLD; R17; 11	ORA; R18; 18	ORA; R19; 13	SAN; R20; 12	BAT; R21; 9	SUR; R22; 23	SUR; R23; 23	SUR; R24; 20	SYM; R25; 22	SYM; R26; 19	SYM; R27; 20	PHI; R28; 29	PHI; R29; 24	PHI; R30; 11										15th	1353
2006	Stone Brothers Racing	Ford BA Falcon	ADE; R1	ADE; R2	PUK; R3	PUK; R4	PUK; R5	BAR; R6	BAR; R7	BAR; R8	WIN; R9	WIN; R10	WIN; R11	HDV; R12	HDV; R13	HDV; R14	QLD; R15	QLD; R16	QLD; R17	ORA; R18	ORA; R19	ORA; R20	SAN; R21; 9	BAT; R22; 3	SUR; R23	SUR; R24	SUR; R25	SYM; R26	SYM; R27	SYM; R28	BHR; R29	BHR; R30	BHR; R31	PHI; R32	PHI; R33	PHI; R34						35th	300
2007	Holden Racing Team	Holden VE Commodore	ADE; R1	ADE; R2	BAR; R3	BAR; R4	BAR; R5	PUK; R6	PUK; R7	PUK; R8	WIN; R9	WIN; R10	WIN; R11	EAS; R12	EAS; R13	EAS; R14	HDV; R15	HDV; R16	HDV; R17	QLD; R18	QLD; R19	QLD; R20	ORA; R21	ORA; R22	ORA; R23	SAN; R24; 13	BAT; R25; 11	SUR; R26	SUR; R27	SUR; R28	BHR; R29	BHR; R30	BHR; R31	SYM; R32	SYM; R33	SYM; R34	PHI; R35	PHI; R36	PHI; R37			38th	30
2008	Holden Racing Team	Holden VE Commodore	ADE; R1	ADE; R2	EAS; R3	EAS; R4	EAS; R5	HAM; R6	HAM; R7	HAM; R8	BAR; R9	BAR; R10	BAR; R11	SAN; R12	SAN; R13	SAN; R14	HDV; R15	HDV; R16	HDV; R17	QLD; R18	QLD; R19	QLD; R20	WIN; R21	WIN; R22	WIN; R23	PHI; Q 10	PHI; R24; 14	BAT; R25; Ret	SUR; R26	SUR; R27	SUR; R28	BHR; R29	BHR; R30	BHR; R31	SYM; R32	SYM; R33	SYM; R34	ORA; R35	ORA; R36	ORA; R37		52nd	118
2010	Kelly Racing	Holden VE Commodore	YMC; R1	YMC; R2	BHR; R3	BHR; R4	ADE; R5	ADE; R6	HAM; R7	HAM; R8	QLD; R9	QLD; R10	WIN; R11	WIN; R12	HDV; R13	HDV; R14	TOW; R15	TOW; R16	PHI; R17; 20	BAT; R18; Ret	SUR; R19	SUR; R20	SYM; R21	SYM; R22	SAN; R23	SAN; R24	SYD; R25	SYD; R26														61st	113

=== Complete World Touring Car Championship results ===
(key) (Races in bold indicate pole position) (Races in italics indicate fastest lap)

Year	Team	Car	1	2	3	4	5	6	7	8	9	10	11	DC	Points
1987	(Australia) Peter Jackson Nissan Racing	Nissan Skyline DR30 RS	MNZ	JAR	DIJ	NUR	SPA	BNO	SIL	BAT ovr:2 cls:2	CLD ovr:5 cls:2	WEL; Ret	FJI	NC	0

† Not eligible for series points

=== Complete Asia-Pacific Touring Car Championship results ===
(key) (Races in bold indicate pole position) (Races in italics indicate fastest lap)

Year	Team	Car	1	2	3	4	DC	Points
1988	(Australia) Peter Jackson Nissan Racing	Nissan Skyline HR31 GTS-R	BAT; Ret	WEL	PUK	FJI	NC	0

=== Complete Bathurst 1000 results ===
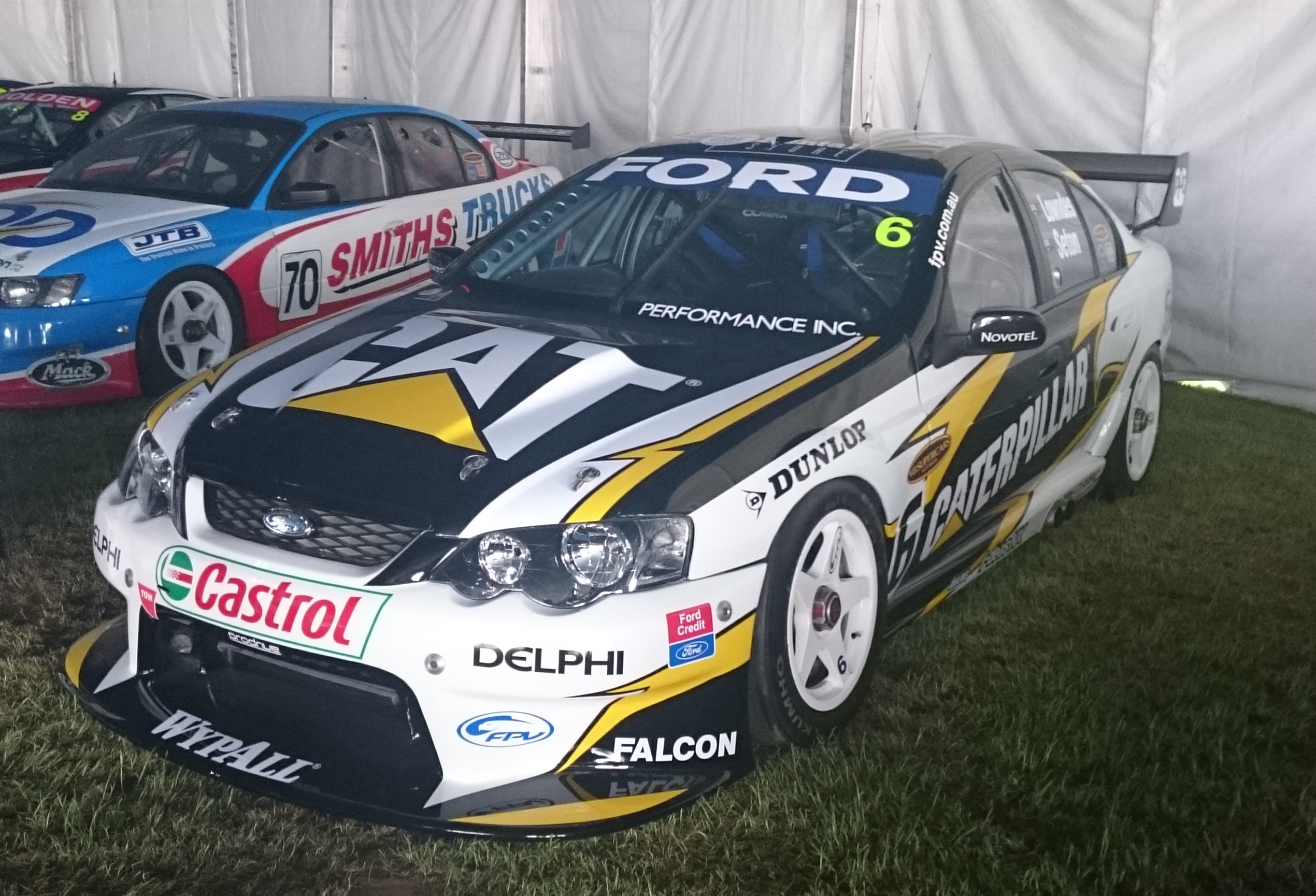
Glenn Seton and Craig Lowndes placed second in the 2004 Bob Jane T-Marts 1000 driving this Ford Falcon (BA) for Ford Performance Racing. The image was taken in 2018.

Year	Team	Co-drivers	Car	Class	Laps	Overall position	Class position
1983	(Australia) Barry Seton	(Australia) Barry Seton	Ford Capri Mk.III	B	134	DNF	DNF
1984	(Australia) Nissan Motor Co.	(Australia) Christine Gibson	Nissan Pulsar EXA	Group C	76	DNF	DNF
1986	(Australia) Peter Jackson Nissan Racing	(Australia) George Fury	Nissan Skyline DR30 RS	B	114	DNF	DNF
1987	(Australia) Peter Jackson Nissan Racing	(Australia) John Bowe	Nissan Skyline DR30 RS	1	157	**2nd**	**2nd**
1988	(Australia) Peter Jackson Nissan Racing	(Sweden) Anders Olofsson	Nissan Skyline HR31 GTS-R	A	0	DNF	DNF
1989	(Australia) Peter Jackson Racing	(Australia) John Goss (Australia) Tony Noske	Ford Sierra RS500	A	140	20th	17th
1989	(Australia) Peter Jackson Racing	(Australia) Tony Noske (France) Alain Ferté	Ford Sierra RS500	A	92	DNF	DNF
1990	(Australia) Peter Jackson Racing	(Australia) Drew Price	Ford Sierra RS500	1	77	DNF	DNF
1991	(Australia) Peter Jackson Racing	(Australia) Gregg Hansford	Ford Sierra RS500	1	146	9th	8th
1992	(Australia) Peter Jackson Racing	(Australia) Alan Jones	Ford Falcon (EB)	A	84	DNF	DNF
1993	(Australia) Peter Jackson Racing	(Australia) Alan Jones	Ford Falcon (EB)	A	147	DNF	DNF
1994	(Australia) Peter Jackson Racing	(New Zealand) Paul Radisich	Ford Falcon (EB)	A	82	DNF	DNF
1995	(Australia) Peter Jackson Racing	(Australia) David Parsons	Ford Falcon (EF)		152	DNF	DNF
1996	(Australia) Ford Credit Racing	(Australia) David Parsons	Ford Falcon (EF)		152	15th	15th
1997	(Australia) Ford Credit Racing	(Australia) David Parsons	Ford Falcon (EL)	L1	121	DNF	DNF
1998	(Australia) Ford Credit Racing	(Australia) Neil Crompton	Ford Falcon (EL)	OC	160	5th	5th
1999	(Australia) Ford Tickford Racing	(Australia) Neil Crompton	Ford Falcon (AU)		161	5th	5th
2000	(Australia) Ford Tickford Racing	(Australia) Neil Crompton	Ford Falcon (AU)		158	13th	13th
2001	(Australia) Ford Tickford Racing	(New Zealand) Steven Richards	Ford Falcon (AU)		161	9th	9th
2002	(Australia) Ford Tickford Racing	(Australia) David Besnard (Australia) Owen Kelly	Ford Falcon (AU)		102	DNF	DNF
2003	(Australia) Ford Performance Racing	(Australia) Craig Lowndes	Ford Falcon (BA)		161	**2nd**	**2nd**
2004	(Australia) Ford Performance Racing	(Australia) Craig Lowndes	Ford Falcon (BA)		161	**2nd**	**2nd**
2005	(Australia) Dick Johnson Racing	(Australia) Dean Canto	Ford Falcon (BA)		158	9th	9th
2006	(Australia) Stone Brothers Racing	(Australia) James Courtney	Ford Falcon (BA)		161	**3rd**	**3rd**
2007	(Australia) Holden Racing Team	(Australia) Nathan Pretty	Holden Commodore (VE)		161	11th	11th
2008	(Australia) Holden Racing Team	(New Zealand) Craig Baird	Holden Commodore (VE)		146	DNF	DNF
2010	(Australia) Kelly Racing	(Australia) Jason Bargwanna	Holden Commodore (VE)		132	DNF	DNF

=== Complete Sandown 500 results ===
Year	Team	Co-drivers	Car	Class	Laps	Overall position	Class position
1986	(Australia) Peter Jackson Nissan Racing	(Australia) George Fury	Nissan Skyline DR30 RS	B	129	**1st**	**1st**
1987	(Australia) Peter Jackson Nissan Racing	(Australia) John Bowe	Nissan Skyline DR30 RS	B	86	DNF	DNF
1988	(Australia) Peter Jackson Nissan Racing	(Sweden) Anders Olofsson	Nissan Skyline HR31 GTS-R	A	1	DNF	DNF
1989	(Australia) Peter Jackson Racing	(Australia) John Goss	Ford Sierra RS500	A	159	4th	4th
1990	(Australia) Peter Jackson Racing	(Australia) George Fury	Ford Sierra RS500	Div.1	161	**1st**	**1st**
1991	(Australia) Peter Jackson Racing	(Australia) Gregg Hansford	Ford Sierra RS500	A	146	DNF	DNF
1992	(Australia) Peter Jackson Racing	(Australia) Alan Jones	Ford Falcon (EB)	3A	18	DNF	DNF
1993	(Australia) Peter Jackson Racing	(Australia) Alan Jones	Ford Falcon (EB)	V8	124	DNF	DNF
1994	(Australia) Peter Jackson Racing	(New Zealand) Paul Radisich	Ford Falcon (EB)	V8	158	9th	9th
1995	(Australia) Peter Jackson Racing	(Australia) Allan Grice	Ford Falcon (EF)		161	**2nd**	**2nd**
1996	(Australia) Ford Credit Racing	(Australia) David Parsons	Ford Falcon (EF)		161	**2nd**	**2nd**
1997	(Australia) Ford Credit Racing	(Australia) David Parsons	Ford Falcon (EL)		150	11th	11th
1998	(Australia) Ford Credit Racing	(Australia) Neil Crompton	Ford Falcon (EL)	OC	145	4th	4th
2003	(Australia) Ford Performance Racing	(Australia) Craig Lowndes	Ford Falcon (BA)		139	16th	16th
2004	(Australia) Ford Performance Racing	(Australia) Craig Lowndes	Ford Falcon (BA)		152	18th	18th
2005	(Australia) Dick Johnson Racing	(Australia) Dean Canto	Ford Falcon (BA)		159	12th	12th
2006	(Australia) Stone Brothers Racing	(Australia) James Courtney	Ford Falcon (BA)		160	9th	9th
2007	(Australia) Holden Racing Team	(Australia) Tony Longhurst	Holden Commodore (VE)		160	13th	13th

Sporting positions
Preceded by Mark Skaife	Winner of the Australian Touring Car Championship; 1993	Succeeded by Mark Skaife
Preceded by Craig Lowndes	Winner of the Australian Touring Car Championship; 1997	Succeeded by Craig Lowndes
