= 1994 ATCC Amaroo Park round =

(New South Wales) 1994 ATCC Amaroo Park round
Event Information
- Round 1 of 10 in the 1994 Australian Touring Car Championship
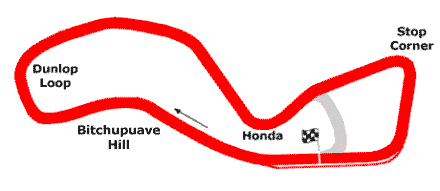
- Date: 25-27 February 1994
- Location: Sydney, New South Wales
- Venue: Amaroo Park
- Weather: Fine

Results
Race 1
Distance	28 laps	54 km
Pole position	Mark Skaife; Gibson Motorsport	49.795
Winner	Mark Skaife; Gibson Motorsport	24:07.842
Race 2
Distance	28 laps	54 km
Winner	Mark Skaife; Gibson Motorsport	24:28.180
Round Results
First	Mark Skaife; Gibson Motorsport	46 pts
Second	Glenn Seton; Glenn Seton Racing	32 pts
Third	Peter Brock; Holden Racing Team	24 pts

The 1994 ATCC Amaroo Park round was the first round of the 1994 Australian Touring Car Championship. It was held on the weekend of 25 to 27 February at Amaroo Park in Sydney, New South Wales.

Mark Skaife dominated the weekend by way of taking pole position, won the Dash for Cash, and winning both races en route to claiming overall round honours. Glenn Seton upheld the Ford contingent by finishing second overall for the weekend and fought back through the pack after finishing last in the opening dash. Peter Brock of the Holden Racing Team rounded out the podium in round points.

This would be the last time the Australian Touring Car Championship would compete at Amaroo Park, and the circuit itself would close down just four years later.

== Background ==
The event was held on the weekend of 25 to 27 February 1994. It was the 15th and final ATCC/V8 Supercar event to be held at the Amaroo Park and consisted of two 28 lap races, as well as the three-lap Dash for Cash for the fastest six qualifiers. Starting positions for the "dash" were drawn at random. Results from the dash determined the first six positions on the starting grid for race one.

After 1994, the Mount Panorama Circuit would replace Amaroo Park in the Australian Touring Car Championship schedule. It would mark the first sprint event to be held at the Bathurst venue since 1972.

=== Entry list ===
A total of 24 drivers were entered into the weekend. With the exception of Mike Conway and Glenn Mason who ran the Holden Commodore (VL) SS Group A SV, and Steven Ellery who ran a Ford Sierra, the rest of the grid comprised either of the VP Holden Commodore or the EB Ford Falcon.

== Race results ==
=== Qualifying ===
Mark Skaife took the first pole position of the year, with Glenn Seton just three-tenths slower.

Pos	No	Name	Team	Vehicle	Time
1	2	(Australia) Mark Skaife	Gibson Motorsport	Holden Commodore (VP)	49.795
2	1	(Australia) Glenn Seton	Glenn Seton Racing	Ford EB Falcon	49.827
3	30	(Australia) Alan Jones	Glenn Seton Racing	Ford EB Falcon	50.024
4	17	(Australia) Dick Johnson	Dick Johnson Racing	Ford EB Falcon	50.073
5	015	(Australia) Tomas Mezera	Holden Racing Team	Holden Commodore (VP)	50.133
6	18	(Australia) John Bowe	Dick Johnson Racing	Ford EB Falcon	50.141
7	05	(Australia) Peter Brock	Holden Racing Team	Holden Commodore (VP)	50.182
8	23	(Australia) Paul Morris	LoGaMo Racing	Holden Commodore (VP)	50.306
9	11	(Australia) Larry Perkins	Perkins Engineering	Holden Commodore (VP)	50.306
10	25	(Australia) Tony Longhurst	LoGaMo Racing	Holden Commodore (VP)	50.341
11	7	(Australia) Neil Crompton	Wayne Gardner Racing	Holden Commodore (VP)	50.378
12	6	(New Zealand) Jim Richards	Gibson Motorsport	Holden Commodore (VP)	50.434
13	4	(Australia) Wayne Gardner	Wayne Gardner Racing	Holden Commodore (VP)	50.575
14	3	(Australia) Trevor Ashby	Lansvale Racing Team	Holden Commodore (VP)	50.804
15	33	(Australia) Bob Pearson	Pro-Duct Motorsport	Holden Commodore (VP)	51.145
16	27	(Australia) Terry Finnigan	Terry Finnigan Racing	Holden Commodore (VP)	51.190
17	12	(Australia) Bob Jones	Ampol Max 3 Racing	Holden Commodore (VP)	51.748
18	28	(Australia) Kevin Waldock	Playscape Racing	Ford EB Falcon	52.125
19	39	(Australia) Chris Smerdon	Challenge Motorsport	Holden Commodore (VP)	52.582
20	47	(Australia) John Trimble	Daily Planet Racing	Holden Commodore (VP)	53.922
21	79	(Australia) Mike Conway	Cadillac Productions	Holden Commodore (VL) SS Group A SV	54.542
22	88	(Australia) Steven Ellery	Steven Ellery Racing	Ford Sierra RS	54.683
23	42	(Australia) Glenn Mason	Glenn Mason Racing	Holden Commodore (VL) SS Group A SV	54.922
24	36	(Australia) Neil Schembri	Schembri Motorsport	Holden Commodore (VP)	54.943

=== Peter Jackson Dash ===
Mark Skaife took out the Peter Jackson Dash with a commanding win - leading from the drop of the flag to the finish. Tomas Mezera was the big mover of the pack, moving from fifth place to second, thereby putting himself on the front row for race one. Meanwhile, Glenn Seton went from second to sixth, losing his front row start.

Pos.	No.	Name	Team	Car	Grid
1	2	(Australia) Mark Skaife	Gibson Motorsport	Holden Commodore (VP)	1
2	015	(Australia) Tomas Mezera	Holden Racing Team	Holden Commodore (VP)	5
3	30	(Australia) Alan Jones	Glenn Seton Racing	Ford Falcon (EB)	3
4	18	(Australia) John Bowe	Dick Johnson Racing	Ford Falcon (EB)	6
5	17	(Australia) Dick Johnson	Dick Johnson Racing	Ford Falcon (EB)	4
6	1	(Australia) Glenn Seton	Glenn Seton Racing	Ford Falcon (EB)	2

=== Race 1 ===
After Mezera was relegated to the back of the grid after being unable to get his engine started for the warm-up lap on time, Skaife was effectively given a free front-row. Using this to his advantage, he got off to an early lead and would keep it all the way to the flag for the first race win of the 1994 season. Down the pack, there were some drivers making moves. Glenn Seton would pass the Dick Johnson Racing duo of Bowe and Johnson and team-mate Alan Jones, who would later incur a puncture, effectively dropping him out of the race. Mezera would climb from 23rd to ninth in a stirring drive. Skaife took a convincing win, with Seton in second and Bowe in third.

Pos.	No.	Name	Team	Car	Laps	Time/Retired	Grid
1	2	(Australia) Mark Skaife	Gibson Motorsport	Holden Commodore (VP)	28	24:07.842	1
2	1	(Australia) Glenn Seton	Glenn Seton Racing	Ford Falcon (EB)	28	+ 5.312	6
3	18	(Australia) John Bowe	Dick Johnson Racing	Ford Falcon (EB)	28	+ 7.163	4
4	17	(Australia) Dick Johnson	Dick Johnson Racing	Ford Falcon (EB)	28	+ 9.091	5
5	05	(Australia) Peter Brock	Holden Racing Team	Holden Commodore (VP)	28	+ 9.625	7
6	23	(Australia) Paul Morris	LoGaMo Racing	Holden Commodore (VP)	28	+ 11.706	8
7	11	(Australia) Larry Perkins	Perkins Engineering	Holden Commodore (VP)	28	+ 12.435	9
8	6	(New Zealand) Jim Richards	Gibson Motorsport	Holden Commodore (VP)	28	+ 13.745	12
9	015	(Australia) Tomas Mezera	Holden Racing Team	Holden Commodore (VP)	28	+ 19.004	24 ^{1}
10	25	(Australia) Tony Longhurst	LoGaMo Racing	Holden Commodore (VP)	28	+ 25.596	10
11	4	(Australia) Wayne Gardner	Wayne Gardner Racing	Holden Commodore (VP)	28	+ 35.156	13
12	27	(Australia) Terry Finnigan	Terry Finnigan Racing	Holden Commodore (VP)	28	+ 37.838	16
13	33	(Australia) Bob Pearson	Pro-Duct Motorsport	Holden Commodore (VP)	28	+ 47.717	15
14	28	(Australia) Kevin Waldock	Playscape Racing	Ford Falcon (EB)	28	+ 49.624	18
15	39	(Australia) Chris Smerdon	Challenge Motorsport	Holden Commodore (VP)	27	+ 1 lap	19
16	7	(Australia) Neil Crompton	Wayne Gardner Racing	Holden Commodore (VP)	27	+ 1 lap	11
17	47	(Australia) John Trimble	Daily Planet Racing	Holden Commodore (VP)	27	+ 1 lap	20
18	30	(Australia) Alan Jones	Glenn Seton Racing	Ford Falcon (EB)	26	+ 2 laps	3
19	88	(Australia) Steven Ellery	Steven Ellery Racing	Ford Sierra RS	26	+ 2 laps	22
20	42	(Australia) Glenn Mason	Glenn Mason Racing	Holden Commodore (VL) SS Group A SV	25	+ 3 laps	23
21	12	(Australia) Bob Jones	Ampol Max 3 Racing	Holden Commodore (VP)	25	+ 3 laps	17
22	3	(Australia) Trevor Ashby	Lansvale Racing Team	Holden Commodore (VP)	24	+ 4 laps	14
Ret	79	(Australia) Mike Conway	Cadillac Productions	Holden Commodore (VL) SS Group A SV	7	Retired	21
WD	36	(Australia) Neil Schembri	Schembri Motorsport	Holden Commodore (VP)		Withdrew	

Notes

1. – Mezera was relegated to the back of the grid after failing to start his engine on time for the warm-up lap.

=== Race 2 ===
In the final Australian Touring Car Championship race at Amaroo Park, Skaife took another flag-to-flag victory, in a relatively uneventful race. Although closer than the previous race, Skaife was never really challenged and walked away from the weekend with maximum points toward his assault on the 1994 season. The podium was completed by Seton and Brock.

Pos.	No.	Name	Team	Car	Laps	Time/Retired	Grid
1	2	(Australia) Mark Skaife	Gibson Motorsport	Holden Commodore (VP)	28	24:28.180	1
2	1	(Australia) Glenn Seton	Glenn Seton Racing	Ford Falcon (EB)	28	+ 1.215	2
3	05	(Australia) Peter Brock	Holden Racing Team	Holden Commodore (VP)	28	+ 1.765	5
4	015	(Australia) Tomas Mezera	Holden Racing Team	Holden Commodore (VP)	28	+ 3.695	9
5	6	(New Zealand) Jim Richards	Gibson Motorsport	Holden Commodore (VP)	28	+ 4.852	8
6	25	(Australia) Tony Longhurst	LoGaMo Racing	Holden Commodore (VP)	28	+ 12.167	10
7	23	(Australia) Paul Morris	LoGaMo Racing	Holden Commodore (VP)	28	+ 16.141	6
8	17	(Australia) Dick Johnson	Dick Johnson Racing	Ford Falcon (EB)	28	+ 22.327	4
9	18	(Australia) John Bowe	Dick Johnson Racing	Ford Falcon (EB)	28	+ 29.249	3
10	4	(Australia) Wayne Gardner	Wayne Gardner Racing	Holden Commodore (VP)	28	+ 34.950	11
11	7	(Australia) Neil Crompton	Wayne Gardner Racing	Holden Commodore (VP)	28	+ 35.954	16
12	3	(Australia) Trevor Ashby	Lansvale Racing Team	Holden Commodore (VP)	28	+ 46.186	22
13	33	(Australia) Bob Pearson	Pro-Duct Motorsport	Holden Commodore (VP)	28	+ 46.368	13
14	12	(Australia) Bob Jones	Ampol Max 3 Racing	Holden Commodore (VP)	28	+ 53.766	21
15	11	(Australia) Larry Perkins	Perkins Engineering	Holden Commodore (VP)	27	+ 1 lap	7
16	27	(Australia) Terry Finnigan	Terry Finnigan Racing	Holden Commodore (VP)	27	+ 1 lap	12
17	39	(Australia) Chris Smerdon	Challenge Motorsport	Holden Commodore (VP)	27	+ 1 lap	15
18	47	(Australia) John Trimble	Daily Planet Racing	Holden Commodore (VP)	26	+ 2 laps	17
19	79	(Australia) Mike Conway	Cadillac Motorsport	Holden Commodore (VL) SS Group A SV	26	+ 2 laps	19
21	42	(Australia) Glenn Mason	Glenn Mason Racing	Holden Commodore (VL) SS Group A SV	26	+ 2 laps	23
Ret	30	(Australia) Alan Jones	Glenn Seton Racing	Ford Falcon (EB)	23	Retired	18
Ret	28	(Australia) Kevin Waldock	Playscape Racing	Ford Falcon (EB)	5	Retired	14
Ret	88	(Australia) Steven Ellery	Steven Ellery Racing	Ford Sierra RS	4	Retired	20
WD	36	(Australia) Neil Schembri	Schembri Motorsport	Holden Commodore (VP)		Withdrew	

== Championship Standings ==
Drivers' Championship standings

Pos.	No.	Driver	Team	Points
1	2	(Australia) Mark Skaife	Gibson Motorsport	46
2	1	(Australia) Glenn Seton	Glenn Seton Racing	32
3	05	(Australia) Peter Brock	Holden Racing Team	24
4	18	(Australia) John Bowe	Dick Johnson Racing	16
5	17	(Australia) Dick Johnson	Dick Johnson Racing	16
