= Daily Planet Racing =

- Manufacturer: Holden; Ford
- Team Principal: John Trimbole
- Race Drivers: John Trimbole (1992–2000); Andrew Harris (1992–93); Gary Cooke (1992); Rohan Cooke (1992–93); Steve Harrington (1994); Gary Waldon (1994); David Attard (1996); Tomas Mezera (1997); Kevin Heffernan (1999)
- Chassis: Holden VL Commodore; Mitsubishi Lancer GSR; Holden VP Commodore; Ford EB Falcon; Holden VS Commodore
- Debut: 1992

Daily Planet Racing was an Australian motor racing team that competed in the Australian Touring Car Championship and V8 Supercars between 1992 and 2000.

== History ==
Daily Planet Racing was formed in 1992 by Daily Planet proprietor John Trimbole. Initially competing in the Holden HQ series, a Holden VL Commodore was purchased from Garry Rogers Motorsport. For the Bathurst 1000, two cars were entered with a second VL leased from Perkins Engineering. Only the latter started, with the other heavily damaged in practice.

In 1993, Trimbole raced Larry Perkins' 1992 season VL Commodore and a Mitsubishi Lancer GSR in production car racing, before purchasing Perkins' 1993 Bathurst 1000 winning VP Commodore for 1994.

In 1995, an ex-Dick Johnson Racing Ford EB Falcon was purchased. In 1997, an ex-Wayne Gardner Racing VS Commodore was acquired. After this was destroyed at Bathurst when Tomas Mezera barrel rolled, a Gibson Motorsport VS was acquired in 1999. This was written off in May 2000 at the Phillip Island round of the development series, bringing an end to the team.

== Drivers ==
=== Supercars Drivers ===
- (Australia) John Trimbole (1997, 1999)
- (Australia) Kevin Heffernan (1999)

=== Super2 Drivers ===
- (Australia) John Trimbole (2000)
