= Pinnacle Motorsport (Australian auto racing team) =

Former Australian motor racing team

- Manufacturer: Holden
- Race Drivers: Greg Crick (1994); Tony Scott (1994/95); Allan Grice (1995); Steven Ellery (1995); John Cleland (1995)
- Chassis: Commodore VP; Commodore VR
- Debut: 1994

Pinnacle Motorsport was an Australian motor racing team that competed in Australian touring car racing in 1994 and 1995.

== History ==
Pinnacle Motorsport first appeared in seven rounds of the 1994 Australian Touring Car Championship with Greg Crick and Tony Scott sharing the driving of Peter Brock's 1993 Advantage Racing built Holden Commodore VP. A new car was built at Crick's Tasmanian workshop, debuting at the Sandown 500 with the original car sold to Ed Lamont.

For 1995, Allan Grice was signed to drive, but the relationship ended before the end of the championship. Tony Scott drove at a few rounds, being joined by Steven Ellery at the Sandown 500 and John Cleland at the Bathurst 1000 where despite having to replace a tailshaft, the team finished sixth.

The team's car was used to test Hoosier tyres at Lakeside with Tomas Mezera in 1996, before being sold to Mal Rose.
