= 1991 Tooheys 1000 =

Motor race in Australia

Seasons
- ← 1990 1992 →

Layout of the Mount Panorama Circuit

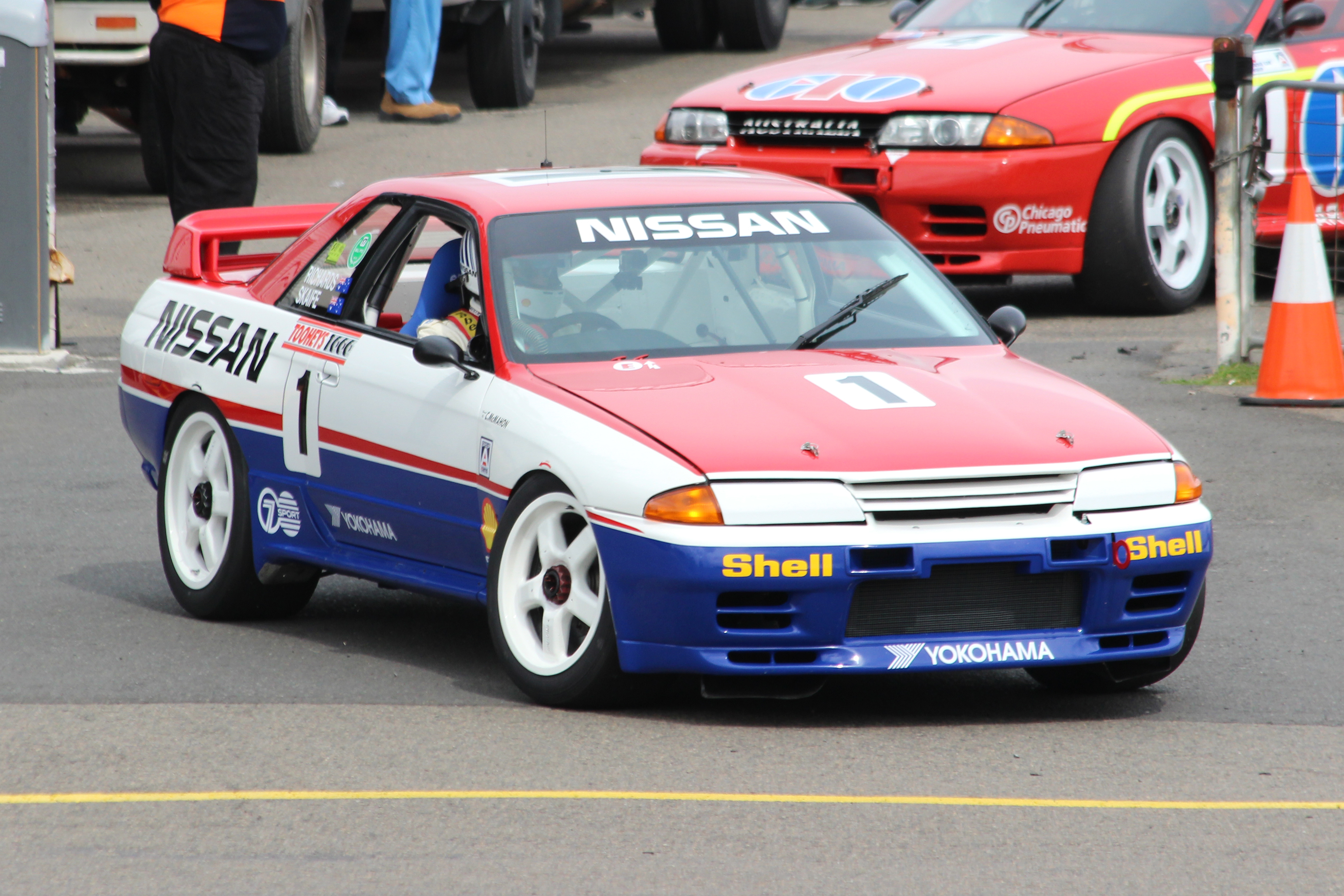
The race-winning Nissan Skyline GT-R of Jim Richards and Mark Skaife, pictured in 2015.

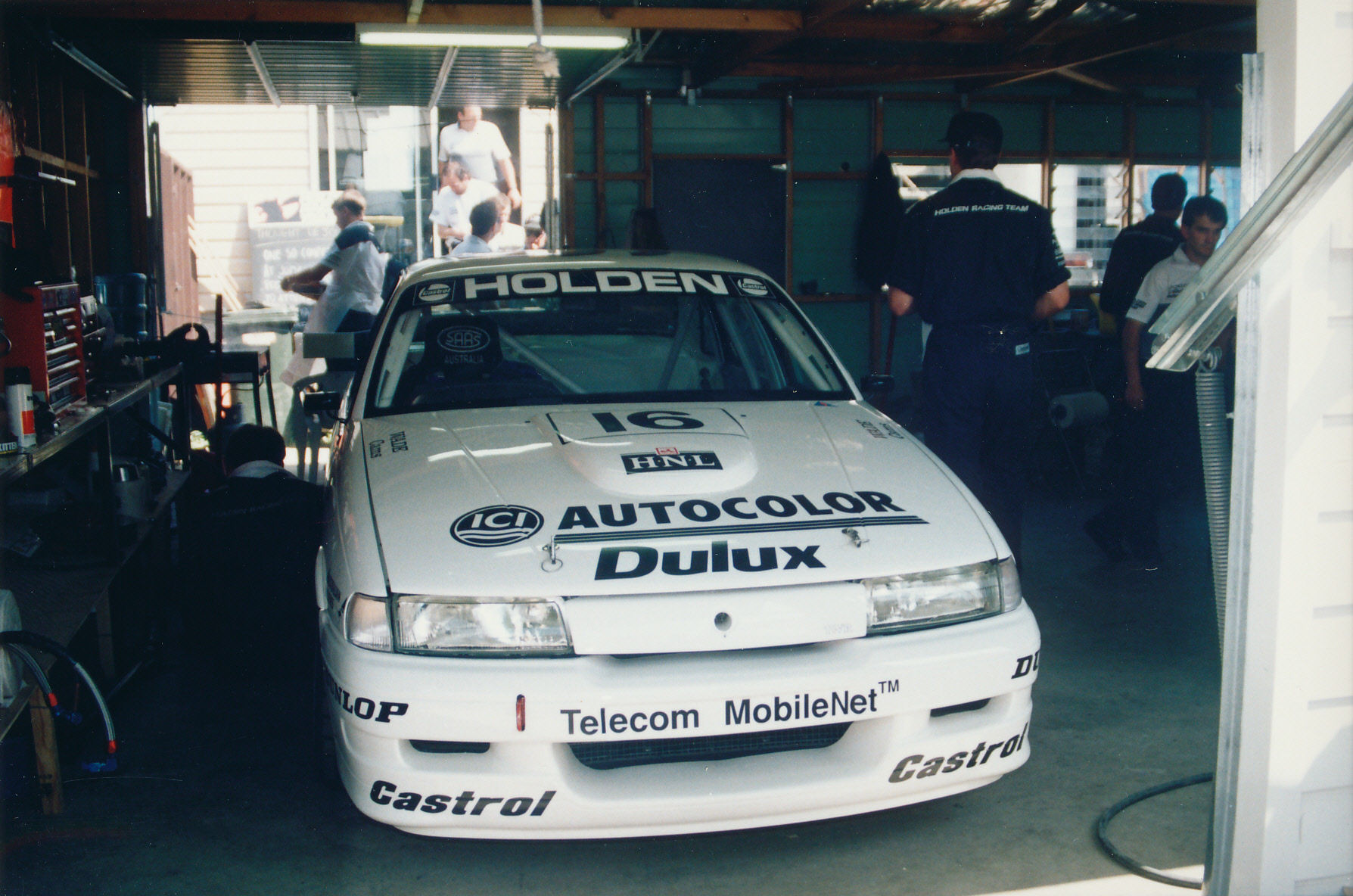
The second-placed Holden VN Commodore SS Group A SV of Win Percy and Allan Grice, pictured at the 1991 race.

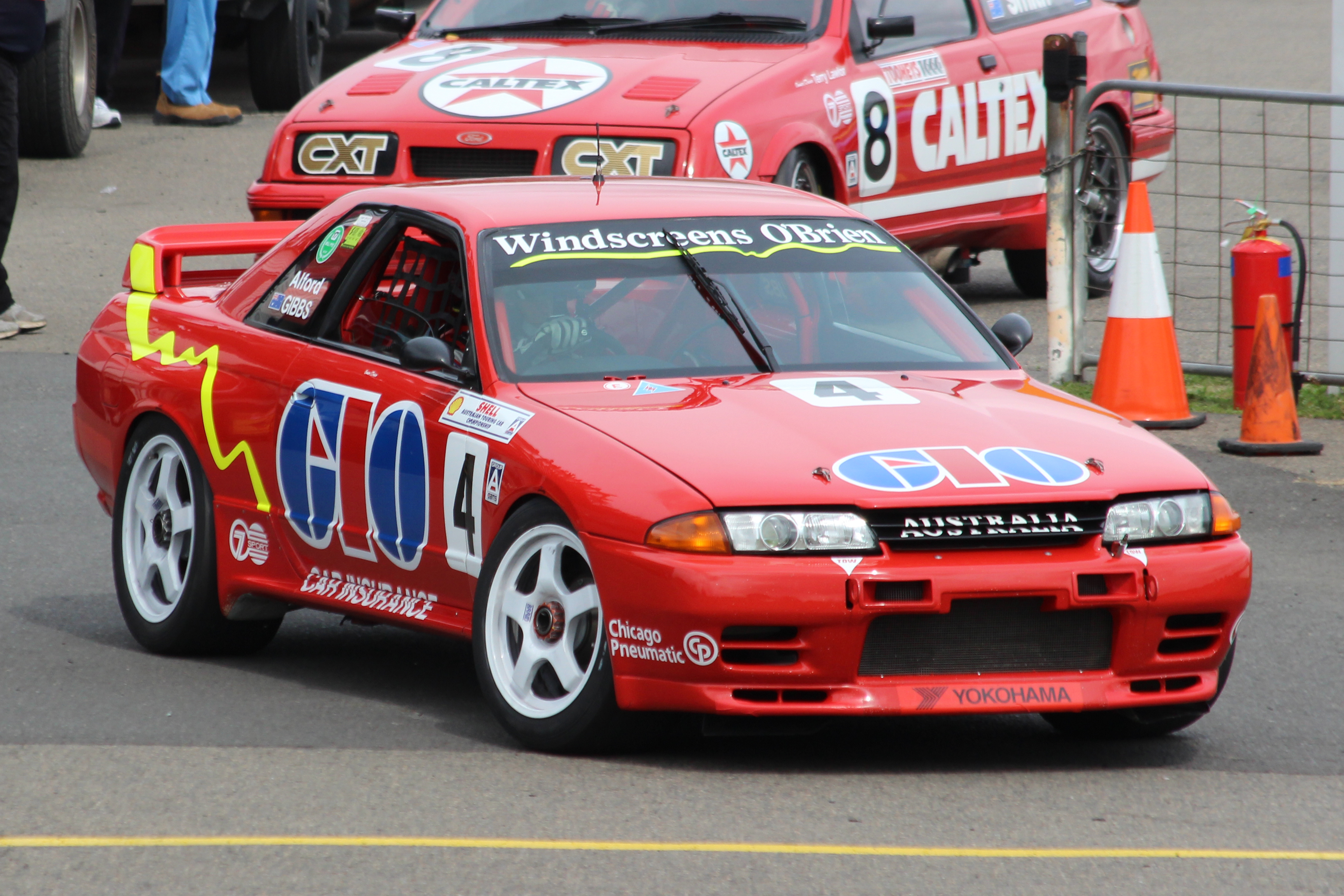
The third-placed Nissan Skyline GT-R of Mark Gibbs and Rohan Onslow, pictured in 2015.

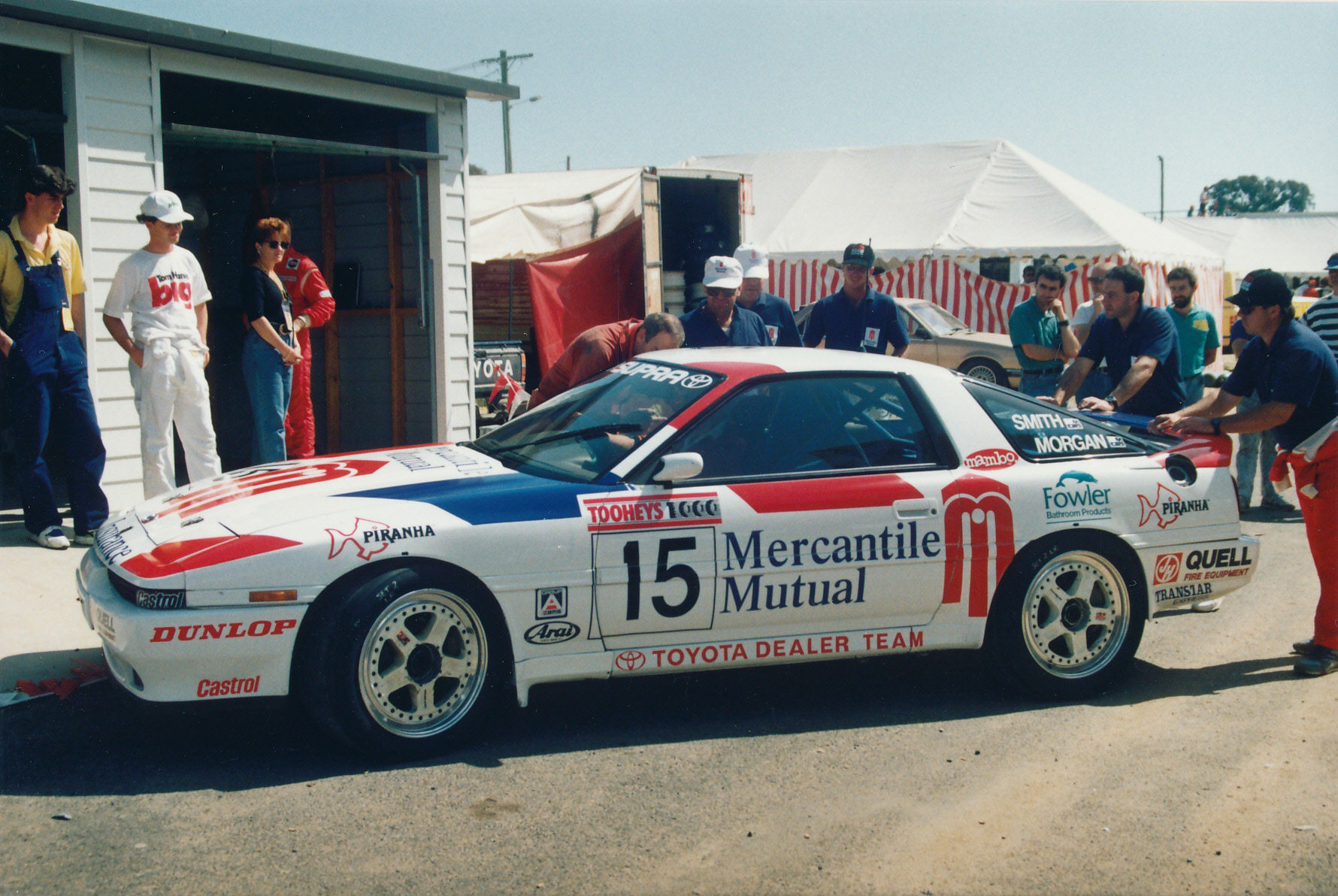
The 18th-placed Toyota Supra of John Smith and Geoff Morgan, pictured at the 1991 race.

The 1991 Tooheys 1000 was a motor race which was staged at the Mount Panorama Circuit just outside Bathurst in New South Wales, Australia on 6 October 1991. It was the 32nd running of the Bathurst 1000. The 1000 km race was held for cars complying with the provisions of Australian Group 3A Touring Car regulations with the field divided into three engine capacity divisions. It was the Round 2 of both the 1991 Australian Endurance Championship and the 1991 Australian Manufacturers' Championship.

With Australia in the midst of a recession, the Australian Racing Drivers Club proposed to supplement the Group A field with production cars Ford Falcon and Holden Commodores. The proposal was overturned by the Confederation of Australian Motorsport.

Nissan driver Mark Skaife became the first driver since Peter Brock in 1983 to claim provisional pole position, pole position after the Top 10 runoff (with a then fastest touring car lap time of 2:12.63), the race win, and the fastest race lap. His lap record in the race was set in the teams #2 GT-R and not the #1 he drove to victory with Jim Richards. (Brock's race record lap of 1983 was also set in the team's second, #25 car, but that was the car he drove to victory with John Harvey and Larry Perkins).

The race was won by the Gibson Motorsport GT-R of Jim Richards and Mark Skaife from the Holden Racing Team Holden Commodore VN of Win Percy and Allan Grice with the Bob Forbes Racing Nissan GT-R of Mark Gibbs and Rohan Onslow finished third. After having won the Sandown 500 in the lead up to Bathurst, third place was enough to see Gibbs and Onslow win the Australian Endurance Championship and help win Nissan their fourth Australian Manufacturers' Championship.

With the overall race time of 6h 19m 14.80s breaking the 1984 record of 6h 23m 13.06s. The 1991 time remained as the race record for the 1000 km event until it was broken at the 2010 event with a 6h 12m 51.4153s race time. As of 2023, the 1991 edition is still one of the fastest races in the history of this event, being the ninth fastest.

The 1991 Tooheys 1000 was also the first Great Race since 1985, to be won by a car manufacturer other than Ford or Holden.

The fourth placed Allan Moffat Racing Ford Sierra RS500 of Gianfranco Brancatelli and Charlie O'Brien was disqualified for running a differential outside of the homologated measurements.

== Divisional structure ==
=== Division 1 ===
For Group 3A cars of 3001cc and Over engine capacity, it featured the turbocharged Nissan Skylines, Ford Sierras, Toyota Supras and a Mitsubishi Starion, the V8 Holden Commodores and a BMW 635 CSi.

=== Division 2 ===
For Group 3A cars of 1601-3000cc engine capacity, it was composed exclusively of BMW M3s, both the 2.5 L "Evo" version and the original 2.3 L car.

=== Division 3 ===
For Group 3A cars of Up to 1600cc engine capacity, it was composed exclusively of various models of Toyota Corolla.

== Tooheys Top 10 ==
Pos	No	Team	Driver	Car	TT10	Qual
Pole	1	Nissan Motorsport Australia	(Australia) Mark Skaife	Nissan Skyline R32 GT-R	2:12.630	2:12.84
2	4	GIO Racing	(Australia) Mark Gibbs	Nissan Skyline R32 GT-R	2:13.876	2:15.08
3	30	Peter Jackson Racing	(Australia) Glenn Seton	Ford Sierra RS500	2:14.892	2:15.26
4	18	Shell Ultra Hi Racing	(Australia) John Bowe	Ford Sierra RS500	2:15.679	2:16.06
5	17	Shell Ultra Hi Racing	(Australia) Dick Johnson	Ford Sierra RS500	2:16.033	2:16.56
6	05	Mobil 1 Racing	(Australia) Peter Brock	Holden VN Commodore SS Group A SV	2:16.071	2:16.44
7	2	Nissan Motorsport Australia	(Australia) Drew Price	Nissan Skyline R32 GT-R	2:16.296	2:15.62
8	11	Mobil 1 Racing	(Australia) Larry Perkins	Holden VN Commodore SS Group A SV	2:17.018	2:16.20
9	35	Peter Jackson Racing	(Australia) David Parsons	Ford Sierra RS500	2:17.581	2:17.54
10	16	Holden Racing Team	(United Kingdom) Win Percy	Holden VN Commodore SS Group A SV	2:17.732	2:16.96

* After breaking Tony Longhurst's 1990 qualifying record of 2:13.84 by a full second, Mark Skaife lowered the mark again with a 2:12.630 in the Top 10. Skaife's Nissan GT-R also recorded a Group A fastest ever 293 km/h (182 mph) on Conrod Straight during the runoff.
* 1991 was the first ever all-Nissan front row at Bathurst. It was also Nissan's third Bathurst pole position after George Fury claimed pole in 1984 in the Bluebird turbo, and Gary Scott had done so in 1986 in the Skyline DR30 RS turbo. With three GT-R's, Nissan also had its best ever representation in the runoff, breaking the record of two set in 1982 and 1986.
* 1991 was the only time between 1988 and 1992 that a Ford Sierra RS500 did not qualify on the pole. Glenn Seton in the fastest Sierra was over 2 seconds slower than Skaife and one second slower than the GT-R of second placed Mark Gibbs. His time was also 0.952 slower than Klaus Niedzwiedz's 1990 pole time in a Sierra.
* Peter Brock made his first appearance driving a Holden in the runoff since the first Group A race in 1985. Brock qualified his Holden VN Commodore SS Group A SV in 6th place. Compared to Skaife's speed on Conrod Straight in the twin-turbo GT-R, Brock's naturally aspirated V8 Commodore recorded 278 km/h (173 mph), though this was a substantial improvement as the older model Holden VL Commodore SS Group A SV usually topped out at around 270 km/h (168 mph) unless aided by a tow from another car. Despite this the VN Commodores were in fact almost 1.5 seconds slower than the VL model had been in 1990.
* 1991 was the only time between his pole positions in 1988 and 1992 that Dick Johnson did not qualify his #17 Sierra on the front row.
* Drew Price (Nissan), Larry Perkins (Commodore), David Parsons (Sierra), and Win Percy (Commodore) were the only drivers not to improve on their qualifying time.
* HRT team manager and defending race winner Win Percy, who was competing in his 6th Bathurst 1000, made his first appearance in the Top 10 runoff. In four of his previous five races his cars had in fact competed in the runoff but it was his co-drivers - Tom Walkinshaw in 1985 and Allan Grice in 1987, 1988 and 1990, who did the driving on those occasions (Percy did not drive in 1986 and only qualified 18th in 1989).

== Official results ==
Pos	Division	No	Team	Drivers	Car	Laps	Qual Pos	Shootout Pos
1	1	1	Nissan Motorsport Australia	(New Zealand) Jim Richards (Australia) Mark Skaife	Nissan Skyline R32 GT-R	161	1	1
2	1	16	Holden Racing Team	(United Kingdom) Win Percy (Australia) Allan Grice	Holden VN Commodore SS Group A SV	160	9	10
3	1	4	GIO Racing	(Australia) Mark Gibbs (Australia) Rohan Onslow	Nissan Skyline R32 GT-R	159	2	2
4	2	20	Benson & Hedges Racing	(New Zealand) Denny Hulme (Australia) Peter Fitzgerald	BMW M3 Evolution	157	19	
5	1	28	Playscape Racing	(Australia) Kevin Waldock (Australia) Brett Peters	Ford Sierra RS500	155	18	
6	1	6	Alf Grant	(Australia) Alf Grant (Australia) Tim Grant	Nissan Skyline HR31 GTS-R	148	27	
7	1	05	Mobil 1 Racing	(Australia) Peter Brock (Australia) Andrew Miedecke	Holden VN Commodore SS Group A SV	147	7	6
8	1	27	Terry Finnigan	(Australia) Terry Finnigan (Australia) Geoff Leeds	Holden VN Commodore SS Group A SV	146	24	
9	1	30	Peter Jackson Racing	(Australia) Glenn Seton (Australia) Gregg Hansford	Ford Sierra RS500	146	3	3
10	1	50	Bryan Sala	(Australia) Bryan Sala (Australia) Graham Lusty	Ford Sierra RS500	140	35	
11	1	14	Warren Jonsson	(Australia) Warren Jonsson (Australia) Graham Jonsson	Holden VL Commodore SS Group A SV	140	28	
12	3	78	Speedtech Motorsport	(Australia) Geoff Full (Australia) Paul Morris	Toyota Sprinter	140	39	
13	1	3	Lansvale Smash Repairs	(Australia) Steve Reed (Australia) Trevor Ashby	Holden VN Commodore SS Group A SV	137	16	
14	1	26	Daryl Hendrick	(Australia) Daryl Hendrick (United Kingdom) Chris Lambden (Australia) John White	Holden VL Commodore SS Group A SV	137	36	
15	1	22	Perkins Engineering; Formula 1 Investments	(Australia) Graham Moore (Belgium) Michel Delcourt (Australia) Peter McKay	Holden VL Commodore SS Group A SV	136	21	
16	1	34	Ray Gulson	(Australia) Ray Gulson (Australia) Graham Gulson	BMW 635 CSi	134	34	
17	3	71	Toyota Team Australia	(Australia) Ron Searle (Australia) Don Griffiths	Toyota Corolla FX-GT	133	42	
18	1	15	Toyota Team Australia	(Australia) John Smith (Australia) Geoff Morgan	Toyota Supra Turbo-A	131	17	
19	3	75	Bob Holden Motors	(Australia) Ted Dunford (Australia) Brad Wright	Toyota Corolla	126	46	
20	3	73	Bob Holden Motors	(Australia) Bob Holden (Finland) Rauno Aaltonen (Australia) Dennis Rogers	Toyota Corolla	124	47	
21	1	12	Ray Lintott	(Australia) Ray Lintott (Australia) Tony Scott (Australia) John English	Ford Sierra RS500	122	20	
DSQ	1	10	Allan Moffat Enterprises	(Italy) Gianfranco Brancatelli (Australia) Charlie O'Brien	Ford Sierra RS500	158	12	
DNF	1	18	Shell Ultra Hi Racing	(New Zealand) Paul Radisich (Australia) Terry Shiel (Australia) John Bowe	Ford Sierra RS500	152	5	4
DNF	1	8	Caltex CXT Racing Team	(Australia) Colin Bond (New Zealand) Graeme Crosby	Ford Sierra RS500	152	14	
DNF	1	21	Ampol Max 3 Racing	(Australia) Bob Jones (Australia) Mike Imrie	Holden VL Commodore SS Group A SV	139	33	
DNF	2	25	Benson & Hedges Racing	(Australia) Tony Longhurst (Australia) Alan Jones	BMW M3 Evolution	138	11	
DNF	1	2	Nissan Motorsport Australia	(Australia) Drew Price (Australia) Garry Waldon (Australia) Mark Skaife	Nissan Skyline R32 GT-R	135	4	7
DNF	2	52	M3 Motorsport	(Australia) Peter Doulman (Australia) John Cotter	BMW M3	133	32	
DNF	1	9	Allan Moffat Enterprises	(Australia) Gary Brabham (New Zealand) Steve Millen	Ford Sierra RS500	128	15	
DNF	1	17	Shell Ultra Hi Racing	(Australia) Dick Johnson (Australia) John Bowe	Ford Sierra RS500	123	8	5
DNF	1	24	Hersonne Engineering	(Australia) Laurie Donaher (Australia) Mick Donaher	Holden VL Commodore SS Group A SV	123	38	
NC	1	39	Everlast Battery Service	(Australia) Bill O'Brien (Australia) Brian Callaghan (Australia) Brian Callaghan Jr	Holden VL Commodore SS Group A SV	116	26	
DNF	1	43	Brian Bolwell Racing	(Australia) Brian Bolwell (Australia) Arthur Abrahams	Ford Sierra RS500	113	22	
DNF	1	7	Holden Racing Team	(Australia) Brad Jones (Australia) Neil Crompton	Holden VN Commodore SS Group A SV	100	13	
DNF	3	77	Bob Holden Motors	(Australia) Geoff Forshaw (Australia) Richard Vorst	Toyota Corolla	96	48	
DNF	1	44	Brian Bolwell Racing	(New Zealand) Glenn McIntyre (New Zealand) Dave Barrow	Ford Sierra RS500	93	31	
DNF	1	19	Shell Ultra Hi Racing	(New Zealand) Kayne Scott (New Zealand) Gregg Taylor	Ford Sierra RS500	90	25	
DNF	3	74	Peter Verheyen	(Australia) Peter Verheyen (Australia) John Vernon	Toyota Sprinter	86	44	
DNF	3	70	Toyota Team Australia	(Australia) Neal Bates (Australia) Rick Bates	Toyota Corolla FX-GT	76	41	
DNF	1	11	Mobil 1 Racing	(Australia) Larry Perkins (Australia) Tomas Mezera	Holden VN Commodore SS Group A SV	65	6	8
DNF	1	35	Peter Jackson Racing	(Australia) David Parsons (Australia) Wayne Park	Ford Sierra RS500	60	10	9
DNF	1	41	Garry Willmington Performance	(Australia) Garry Willmington (Egypt) Reda Awadullah	Toyota Supra Turbo	56	30	
DNF	1	13	Peter Janson	(New Zealand) Peter Janson (Australia) Peter Gazzard	Holden VL Commodore SS Group A SV	53	28	
DNF	1	33	Pro-Duct Motorsport	(Australia) Bob Pearson (Australia) Bruce Stewart	Holden VN Commodore SS Group A SV	48	23	
DNF	2	54	Kiwi Motorsport	(New Zealand) Keith Sharp (New Zealand) Ian Spurle (Tanzania) Edgar Salwegter	BMW M3	34	40	
DNF	3	72	David Sala	(Australia) David Sala (Australia) Brad Stratton	Toyota Corolla	28	43	
DNS	1	32	Pro-Duct Motorsport	(Australia) Bob Tindal (Australia) Darren Stewart	Holden VN Commodore SS Group A SV		37	
DNS	3	76	Bob Holden Motors	(Australia) Mike Conway (Australia) Calvin Gardiner	Toyota Corolla		45	
DNQ	1	36	Ron Masing	(Australia) Ron Masing (Australia) Greville Arnel	Mitsubishi Starion Turbo		49	
DNP	3	79	Malcolm Rea	(Australia) Malcolm Rea (Australia) Brian Selby (Australia) Garry Jones	Toyota Sprinter			

== Statistics ==
- Provisional Pole Position - #1 Mark Skaife - 2:12.84
- Pole Position – #1 Mark Skaife – 2:12.63
- Fastest Lap – #2 Mark Skaife – 2:14.50 - Lap 130 (new lap record)
- Average Speed – 158 km/h
- Race Time - 6:19:14.80 (new race record)

== See also ==
1991 Australian Touring Car season
