= 1991 Australian Touring Car Championship =

Motor racing competition

Seasons
- ← 1990 1992 →

The 1991 Australian Touring Car Championship was a CAMS sanctioned motor racing title open to Group 3A Touring Cars. The title, which was the 32nd Australian Touring Car Championship, was contested over a nine-round series which began on 24 February 1991 at Sandown Raceway and ended on 11 August at Oran Park Raceway, The series was promoted as the Shell Australian Touring Car Championship and was won by Jim Richards driving a Nissan Skyline GT-R.

== Teams and drivers ==
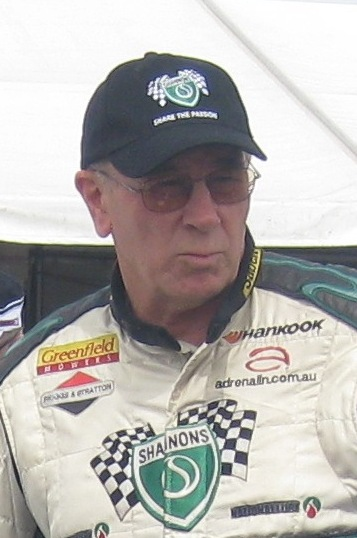
Championship winner Jim Richards, pictured in 2011

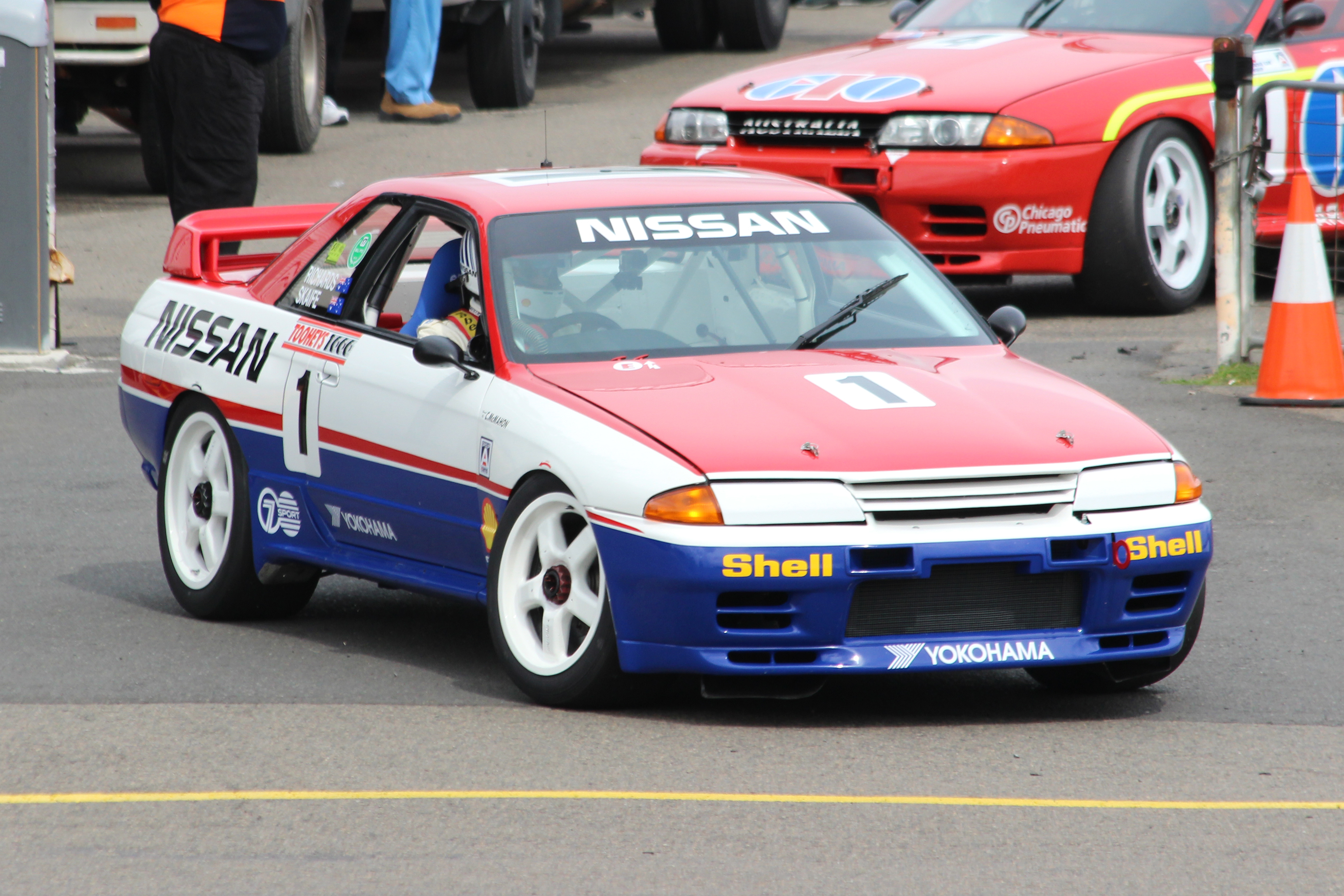
Richards won the championship driving a Nissan Skyline R32 GT-R. The example above is pictured in 2015.

The following teams and drivers competed in the 1991 Australian Touring Car Championship.

Team	Car	No	Driver	Rounds
Nissan Motorsport Australia	Nissan Skyline R32 GT-R	1	(New Zealand) Jim Richards	All
Nissan Motorsport Australia	Nissan Skyline R32 GT-R	2	(Australia) Mark Skaife	All
Lansvale Racing Team	Holden VN Commodore SS Group A SV	3	(Australia) Trevor Ashby	5-6, 9
Lansvale Racing Team	Holden VN Commodore SS Group A SV	3	(Australia) Steve Reed	1, 4
Bob Forbes Racing	Nissan Skyline R32 GT-R	4	(Australia) Mark Gibbs	9
Bob Forbes Racing	Holden VL Commodore SS Group A SV; Holden VN Commodore SS Group A SV	21	(Australia) Mark Gibbs	1-2, 6, 8
Mobil 1 Racing	Holden VN Commodore SS Group A SV	05	(Australia) Peter Brock	All
Mobil 1 Racing	Holden VN Commodore SS Group A SV	11	(Australia) Larry Perkins	All
Alf Grant Racing	Nissan Skyline HR31 GTS-R	6	(Australia) Tim Grant	4
Caltex CXT Racing Team	Ford Sierra RS500	8	(Australia) Colin Bond	All
Bob Holden Motors	Toyota Sprinter	13	(Australia) Bob Holden	1, 4-6, 8
Bob Holden Motors	Toyota Corolla E80	75	(Australia) Frank Binding	6
Bob Holden Motors	Toyota Corolla E80	76	(Australia) Mike Conway	6, 9
Warren Jonsson	Holden VL Commodore SS Group A SV	14	(Australia) Warren Jonsson	4, 8
Holden Racing Team	Holden VN Commodore SS Group A SV	16	(United Kingdom) Win Percy	1-7, 9
Holden Racing Team	Holden VN Commodore SS Group A SV	16	(Australia) Allan Grice	8
Shell Ultra-Hi Racing	Ford Sierra RS500	17	(Australia) Dick Johnson	All
Shell Ultra-Hi Racing	Ford Sierra RS500	18	(Australia) John Bowe	All
Benson & Hedges Racing	BMW M3 Evolution	20	(Australia) Alan Jones	All
Benson & Hedges Racing	BMW M3 Evolution	25	(Australia) Tony Longhurst	All
Terry Finnigan	Holden VL Commodore SS Group A SV; Holden VN Commodore SS Group A SV	27	(Australia) Terry Finnigan	1, 4-6, 8-9
Playscape Racing	Ford Sierra RS500	28	(New Zealand) Kevin Waldock	1-2, 4, 6
Wayne Park	Holden VL Commodore SS Group A SV	29	(Australia) Wayne Park	1
Peter Jackson Racing	Ford Sierra RS500	30	(Australia) Glenn Seton	All
Toyota Team Australia	Toyota Corolla FX-GT	31	(New Zealand) John Faulkner	
PACE Racing	Holden VL Commodore SS Group A SV	32	(Australia) Kevin Heffernan	4, 8
Pro-Duct Motorsport	Holden VN Commodore SS Group A SV	33	(Australia) Bob Pearson	1, 5-6
Brian Bolwell	Ford Sierra RS500	43	(Australia) Brian Bolwell	4
Brian Bolwell	Ford Sierra RS500	44	(Australia) Mike Twigden	4
Peter Verheyen	Toyota Sprinter	48	(Australia) John Vernon	9
Peter Verheyen	Toyota Sprinter	48	(Australia) Peter Verheyen	5-8
M3 Motorsport	BMW M3	52	(Australia) John Cotter	6, 9
M3 Motorsport	BMW M3	53	(Australia) Peter Doulman	6, 9
David Sala	Toyota Corolla E80	72	(Australia) David Sala	1

== Changes ==
With Australia in the middle of an economic downturn (the "Recession we had to have" according to Federal Treasurer Paul Keating), entry numbers were significantly down on 1990 at almost every round, with only eleven cars appearing at Wanneroo Raceway. Notable absentees included Allan Moffat Racing and Toyota Team Australia, while Peter Brock closed his Mobil 1 Racing team (effectively bringing to an end the old Holden Dealer Team which had been established in 1969) and took his Mobil sponsorship to Perkins Engineering, reuniting with his Bathurst 1000 winning co-driver of 1982, 1983 and 1984, Larry Perkins in a pair of new Holden VN Commodore SS Group A SVs. The Brock teams swap back to Holden came more out of financial necessity due to their technical link Andy Rouse in Britain switching from Ford to Toyota in 1991, and with the Ford Sierra RS500's being expensive to run, forming a link with former HDT offsider Perkins to run the locally made Commodore's made much more commercial sense to major sponsors Mobil.

Tony Longhurst's Benson & Hedges Racing abandoned their powerful but tyre shredding Ford Sierra RS500's and became Australia's factory BMW team, racing two former Schnitzer Motorsport BMW M3 Evolutions which included upgraded front and rear spoilers as well as an increase in engine size from 2.3 to 2.5L for the 4 cyl engine. The 200 cc larger engine in the M3 also saw power for the small car rise from around 300 hp (224 kW; 304 PS) to approximately 340 hp (254 kW; 345 PS). The cars were delivered to the team's Gold Coast base after the Wellington 500 in December 1990, though under the Group A rules as used by CAMS the cars did not have the Anti-lock braking system (ABS) that they were allowed to have in the German DTM series. Team owners Longhurst and Frank Gardner had a previous association with BMW and the M3, Longhurst having raced a M3 for Gardner's factory backed JPS Team BMW in 1987, while the JPS team had used a variety of BMWs between 1981 and 1987.

With the economic downturn making it unlikely Holden Special Vehicles would be able to sell the required 500 evolution VN Commodore SS Group A SVs to make it eligible for Group A competition (they ended up building only 320), CAMS gave dispensation for the model to race in Australia and thus the bigger budget Holden teams (HRT and Brock/Perkins) upgraded. Some of the privateers, notably the Lansvale Smash Repairs team and Terry Finnigan also upgraded to the VN, but most Holden privateers continued to race the previous VL model. The VN model Commodore had actually been released back in August 1988, and would be superseded by the VP in October 1991. The Commodores did get other concessions from CAMS, including losing some 75 kg (165.3 lb) to bring the minimum weight of the car down to only 1,250 kg (2,755.8 lb), plus the homologation of a Holinger 6-speed gearbox in mid-year. The Mobil 1 and Holden Racing Team VN Commodores were producing approximately 520 hp (388 kW; 527 PS). The two teams ran on different tyres though, with the HRT sticking with Dunlop's while Brock and Perkins used Bridgestone's, with the Mobil team suffering in the first half of the season due to the lack of suitable rubber available for the Commodore's.

The Gibson Motorsport run Nissan Skyline R32 GT-Rs were basically as they had finished 1990. The 4WD, twin-turbo cars nicknamed "Godzilla" were producing approximately 640 hp (477 kW; 649 PS), though CAMS made the cars carry an extra 15 kg (33.1 lb) to bring them to a total of 1,360 kg (2,998.3 lb), the heaviest car on the grid.

Although the Ford Sierras had lost numbers with the Brock and Longhurst teams now driving Holden and BMWs respectively, the 4 cyl turbo Fords were still one of the fastest cars on the grid. The leading Sierras were producing approximately 540 hp (403 kW; 547 PS), and for 1991 CAMS reduced their minimum weight from 1990's 1,185 kg (2,612.5 lb) to the cars original (1987) homologated weight of just 1,100 kg (2,425.1 lb). Like the Commodores, the Sierras would also benefit from a mid-season homologation of a 6-speed Holinger gearbox.

== Season review ==
The season was dominated by Nissan Motor Sport. The team's two drivers won seven of the nine rounds between them, with six of those victories being part of 1-2 finishes. Mark Skaife scored more championship points than any other driver, but with each driver having to drop their worst round (if they actually scored points in all nine rounds), Skaife lost ten points from his fourth at Round 8 at Lakeside, giving the title to his teammate and defending champion, Jim Richards who only scored in the first eight rounds after failing to finish the Grand Finale at Oran Park. This continued the New Zealand domination of the Championship in the Group A era, with New Zealand drivers having won five of the seven Australian Touring Car Championships held under those regulations (Richards in 1985, 1987, 1990 and 1991 with Robbie Francevic winning in 1986), the only Australian winner being 1988 and 1989 champion Dick Johnson.

Third place was claimed by Tony Longhurst who won two rounds, at Amaroo Park and Lakeside International Raceway in his Benson & Hedges BMW M3 Evolution. BMW's return with a top line team was underlined by teammate, 1980 Formula One World Drivers' Champion Alan Jones, finishing fourth in the points after finishing the championship strongly with consecutive second placings in the final two rounds. During the series, the BMW, which were the lightest outright cars (which helped their tyre wear and gave a braking advantage), became the only consistent challengers to the GT-Rs.

1991 also saw the return of Peter Brock to Holden for the first time since 1987. After racing BMWs in 1988 followed by two seasons running Andy Rouse sourced Ford Sierras which had seen Brock finish 3rd and 2nd in the championship, Brock teamed with former Holden Dealer Team co-driver/manager Larry Perkins in two Perkins Engineering built Holden VN Commodore SS Group A SVs, and while initially they were off the pace due to the lack of suitable Bridgestone tyres, this was rectified by halfway through the series and Brock in particular became a regular challenger with strong qualifying performances, though the heavy Commodores still to be hard on tyres in the ATCC's sprint race format. Brock finished 6th in the championship while Perkins finished in 11th place. In a 2014 interview with Australian Muscle Car magazine, Perkins would claim that part of the contract with Brock and his main sponsor Mobil stated that in championship races, he was not allowed to finish ahead of Brock unless it was unavoidable.

Brock and Perkins were joined in the fight for Holden by Holden Racing Team manager Win Percy who also had a strong season in his VN Commodore. Percy's 4th place at Amaroo Park was the best finish for a Commodore through the series and he surprised everyone when he qualified second in rounds 2 and 3 at Symmons Plains and Wanneroo. Percy finished the series in 8th place, one place ahead of five time ATCC champion Dick Johnson who endured a miserable series in his Sierra, his best finish being 4th in the opening round at Sandown Raceway.

== Championship calendar ==
The 1991 Australian Touring Car Championship was contested over a nine-round series with one race per round. Each round was of approximately 50 minutes duration.

Rd.	Circuit	City / state	Date
1	Sandown International Motor Raceway	Melbourne, Victoria	22 - 24 Feb
2	Symmons Plains Raceway	Launceston, Tasmania	8 - 10 Mar
3	Wanneroo Raceway	Perth, Western Australia	12 - 14 Apr
4	Lakeside International Raceway	Brisbane, Queensland	26 - 28 Apr
5	Winton Motor Raceway	Benalla, Victoria	3–5 May
6	Amaroo Park	Sydney, New South Wales	31 May - 2 Jun
7	Mallala Motor Sport Park	Mallala, South Australia	21 - 23 Jun
8	Lakeside International Raceway	Brisbane, Queensland	12 - 14 Jul
9	Oran Park Raceway	Sydney, New South Wales	9 - 11 Aug

== Results and standings ==
=== Season summary ===
Round	Event	Pole position	Winning driver	Winning team	Manufacturer	Report
1	Sandown	(New Zealand) Jim Richards	(New Zealand) Jim Richards	Nissan Motorsport Australia	(Japan) Nissan	
2	Launceston	(New Zealand) Jim Richards	(New Zealand) Jim Richards	Nissan Motorsport Australia	(Japan) Nissan	
3	Perth	(New Zealand) Jim Richards	(Australia) Mark Skaife	Nissan Motorsport Australia	(Japan) Nissan	
4	Lakeside	(New Zealand) Jim Richards	(New Zealand) Jim Richards	Nissan Motorsport Australia	(Japan) Nissan	
5	Winton	(New Zealand) Jim Richards	(New Zealand) Jim Richards	Nissan Motorsport Australia	(Japan) Nissan	
6	Amaroo	(Australia) John Bowe	(Australia) Tony Longhurst	(Australia) Benson & Hedges Racing	(Germany) BMW	
7	Mallala	(Australia) Mark Skaife	(Australia) Mark Skaife	Nissan Motorsport Australia	(Japan) Nissan	
8	Lakeside	(Australia) Mark Skaife	(Australia) Tony Longhurst	(Australia) Benson & Hedges Racing	(Germany) BMW	
9	Oran Park	(Australia) Mark Skaife	(Australia) Mark Skaife	Nissan Motorsport Australia	(Japan) Nissan	

=== Championship standings ===
Championship points were awarded on a 20–15–12–10–8–6–4–3–2–1 basis for the top ten positions at each round. Each driver was required to drop any points earned from the worst round result.

Pos	Driver	Car	San.	Sym.	Wan.	Lak.	Win.	Ama.	Mal.	Lak.	Ora.	Pts
1	Jim Richards	Nissan Skyline R32 GT-R	1st	1st	2nd	1st	1st	2nd	2nd	3rd	Ret	137
2	Mark Skaife	Nissan Skyline R32 GT-R	2nd	2nd	1st	2nd	2nd	3rd	1st	(4th)	1st	132 (142)
3	Tony Longhurst	BMW M3 Evolution	(9th)	4th	3rd	3rd	4th	1st	3rd	1st	3rd	108 (110)
4	Alan Jones	BMW M3 Evolution	6th	9th	5th	5th	5th	5th	(10th)	2nd	2nd	70 (71)
5	Glenn Seton	Ford Sierra RS500	Ret	3rd	4th	4th	3rd	12th	5th	5th	4th	70
6	Peter Brock	Holden VN Commodore SS Group A SV	7th	7th	9th	6th	(9th)	6th	6th	6th	7th	38 (40)
7	John Bowe	Ford Sierra RS500	3rd	11th	8th	10th	7th	4th	7th	Ret	Ret	34
8	Win Percy	Holden VN Commodore SS Group A SV	5th	Ret	Ret	11th	6th	8th	4th		8th	30
9	Dick Johnson	Ford Sierra RS500	4th	5th	Ret	9th	11th	7th	8th	Ret	11th	27
10	Colin Bond	Ford Sierra RS500	11th	6th	6th	7th	8th	10th	9th	7th	Ret	26
11	Larry Perkins	Holden VN Commodore SS Group A SV	14th	8th	7th	8th	10th	9th	11th	12th	6th	19
12	Mark Gibbs	Holden VL Commodore SS Group A SV; Holden VN Commodore SS Group A SV; Nissan Skyline R32 GT-R	10th	12th				Ret		10th	5th	10
13	Kevin Waldock	Ford Sierra RS500	8th	10th		12th		13th				4
13	Terry Finnigan	Holden VN Commodore SS Group A SV	12th			13th	13th	11th		9th	9th	4
15	Allan Grice	Holden VN Commodore SS Group A SV								8th		3
16	John Cotter	BMW M3						16th			10th	1
Pos	Driver	Car	San.	Sym.	Wan.	Lak.	Win.	Ama.	Mal.	Lak.	Ora.	Pts

Colour	Result
Gold	Winner
Silver	Second place
Bronze	Third place
Green	Points classification
Blue	Non-points classification
Blue	Non-classified finish (NC)
Purple	Retired, not classified (Ret)
Red	Did not qualify (DNQ)
Red	Did not pre-qualify (DNPQ)
Black	Disqualified (DSQ)
White	Did not start (DNS)
White	Withdrew (WD)
White	Race cancelled (C)
Blank	Did not practice (DNP)
Blank	Did not arrive (DNA)
Blank	Excluded (EX)

Positions shown within brackets are those for which drivers were awarded points that were not counted towards championship totals.

== See also ==
1991 Australian Touring Car season
