= 1990 Australian Touring Car Championship =

Motor racing competition

Seasons
- ← 1989 1991 →

The 1990 Australian Touring Car Championship was a CAMS sanctioned Australian motor racing title open to Group 3A Touring Cars. The championship, which was the 31st Australian Touring Car Championship, was promoted as the Shell Ultra Australian Touring Car Championship. It began on 25 February 1990 at Amaroo Park and ended on 15 July at Oran Park Raceway after eight rounds.

The title was won by Jim Richards, his third Australian Touring Car Championship victory. Richards drove for Nissan Motorsport Australia, utilising both Nissan Skyline HR31 GTS-R and the new Skyline R32 GT-R during one of the most competitive seasons in the history of the championship.

== Teams and drivers ==
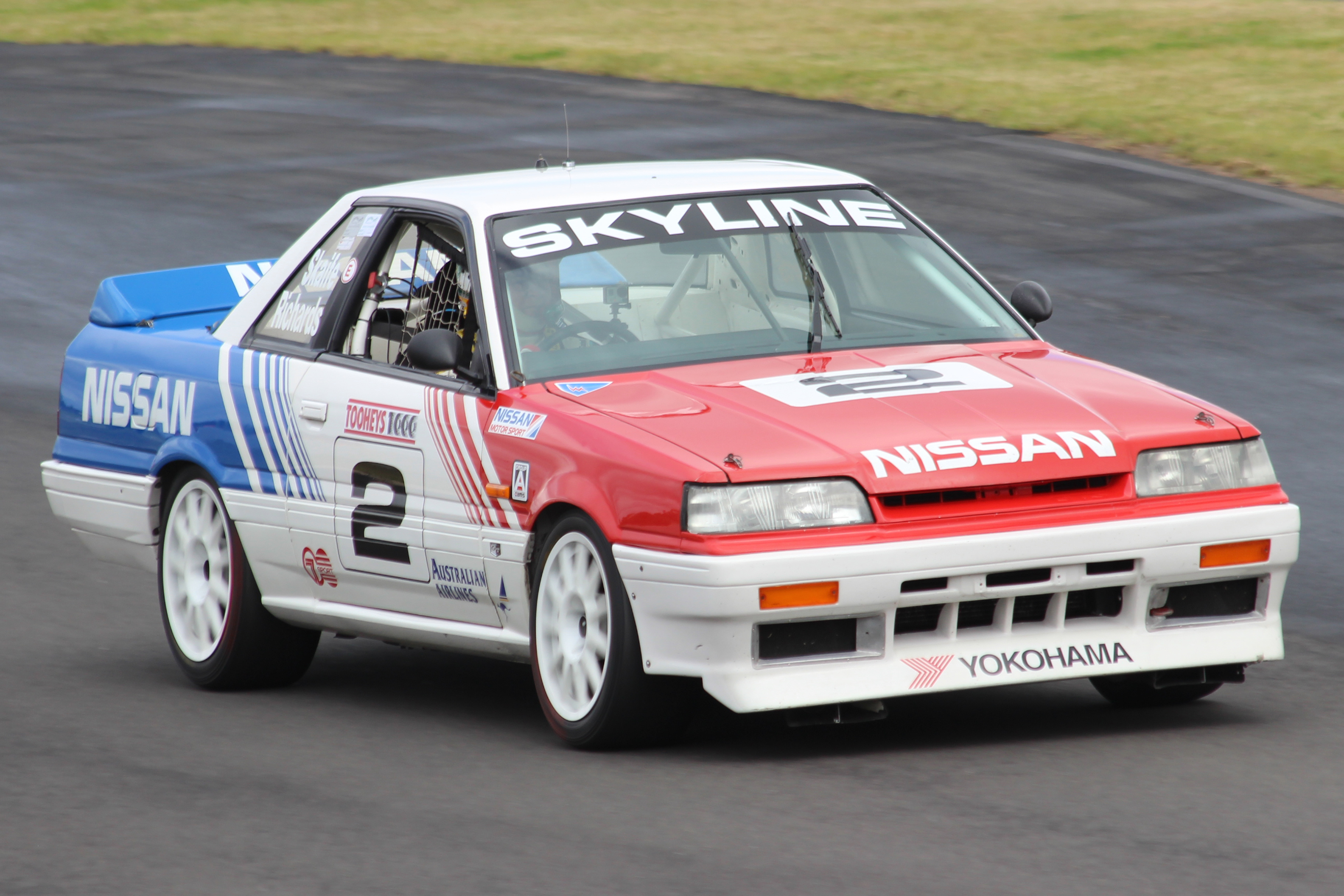
Jim Richards won the championship driving a Nissan Skyline HR31 GTS-R (car pictured above in 2014) and a Nissan Skyline R32 GT-R

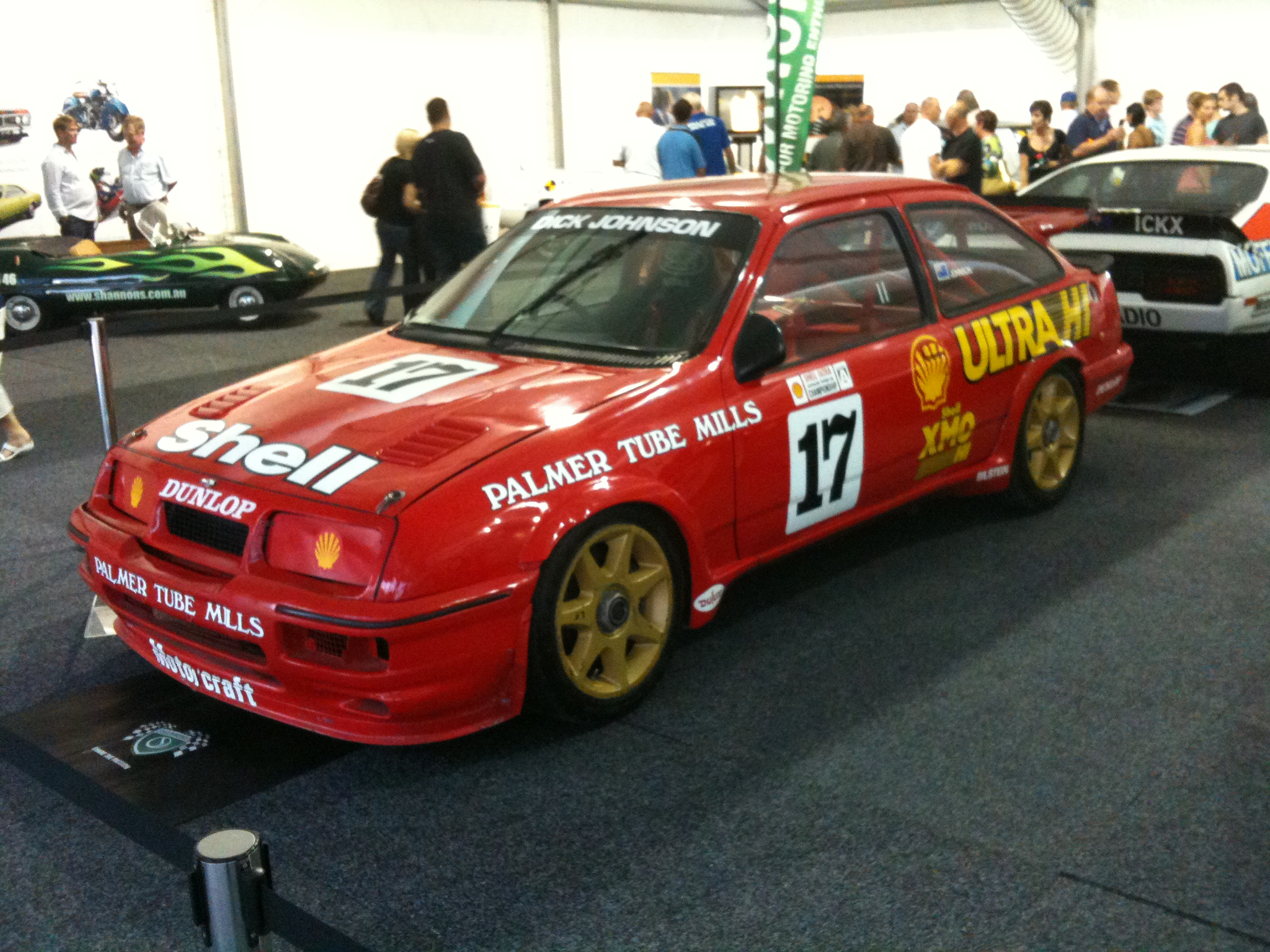
Dick Johnson placed third driving a Ford Sierra RS500 (car pictured in 2017)

The following drivers and teams competed in the 1990 Australian Touring Car Championship.

Team (Entrant)	Car	No	Driver
Nissan Motorsport Australia	Nissan Skyline HR31 GTS-R; Nissan Skyline R32 GT-R	2	(New Zealand) Jim Richards
Nissan Motorsport Australia	Nissan Skyline HR31 GTS-R; Nissan Skyline R32 GT-R	3	(Australia) Mark Skaife
Caltex CXT Racing	Ford Sierra RS500	4	(Australia) Ken Mathews
Caltex CXT Racing	Ford Sierra RS500	8	(Australia) Colin Bond
Mobil 1 Racing	Ford Sierra RS500	05	(Australia) Peter Brock
Mobil 1 Racing	Ford Sierra RS500	6	(Australia) Andrew Miedecke
Mobil 1 Racing	Ford Sierra RS500	26	(Australia) Tony Noske
Allan Moffat Enterprises	Ford Sierra RS500	9	(Australia) Gregg Hansford
Perkins Engineering	Holden VL Commodore SS Group A SV	11	(Australia) Larry Perkins
Perkins Engineering	Holden VL Commodore SS Group A SV	31	(Indonesia) Tommy Suharto
John Holmes Motorsport	Ford Sierra RS500	12	(Australia) Ray Lintott
Bob Holden Motors	Toyota Sprinter AE86	13	(Australia) Mike Conway
Bob Holden Motors	Toyota Sprinter AE86	13	(Australia) Bob Holden
Bob Holden Motors	Toyota Corolla E80	74	(Australia) Phil Alexander (Australia) Keith McCulloch
Bob Holden Motors	Toyota Corolla E80	75	(Australia) Dennis Rogers
Bob Holden Motors	Toyota Sprinter AE86	13	(Australia) Tim Hall
Murray Carter	Ford Sierra RS500	14	(Australia) Murray Carter
Toyota Team Australia	Toyota Supra Turbo-A	15	(Australia) John Smith
Toyota Team Australia	Toyota Corolla FX-GT	70	(Australia) Neal Bates
Toyota Team Australia	Toyota Corolla FX-GT	71	(New Zealand) John Faulkner
Holden Racing Team	Holden VL Commodore SS Group A SV	16	(United Kingdom) Win Percy (Australia) Neil Crompton
Shell Ultra Hi Racing	Ford Sierra RS500	17	(Australia) Dick Johnson
Shell Ultra Hi Racing	Ford Sierra RS500	18	(Australia) John Bowe
Phil Ward Racing	Mercedes-Benz 190E 2.3–16	19	(Australia) Phil Ward
Benson & Hedges Racing	Ford Sierra RS500	20	(Australia) Alan Jones
Benson & Hedges Racing	Ford Sierra RS500	25	(Australia) Tony Longhurst
Benson & Hedges Racing	Ford Sierra RS500	62	(New Zealand) Neville Crichton
Bob Forbes Racing	Holden VL Commodore SS Group A SV	21	(Australia) Mark Gibbs
Lusty Engineering	Holden VL Commodore SS Group A SV	22	(Australia) Graham Lusty
Chris Lambden	Nissan Skyline HR31 GTS-R	23	(Australia) Chris Lambden
Jagparts Racing	Holden VL Commodore SS Group A SV	24	(Australia) Gerald Kay
Terry Finnigan	Holden VL Commodore SS Group A SV	27	(Australia) Terry Finnigan (Australia) Geoff Leeds
Lawrie Nelson	Ford Mustang	29	(Australia) Lawrie Nelson
Peter Jackson Racing	Ford Sierra RS500	30	(Australia) Glenn Seton
Peter Jackson Racing	Ford Sierra RS500	35	(Australia) Drew Price (Australia) George Fury
Lansvale Racing Team	Holden VL Commodore SS Group A	32	(Australia) Trevor Ashby (Australia) Steve Reed
Pro-Duct Motorsport	Holden VL Commodore SS Group A SV	33	(Australia) Bob Pearson (Australia) Marc Ducquet
Ray Gulson	BMW 635 CSi	34	(Australia) Ray Gulson
Ian Carrig	BMW 635 CSi	36	(Australia) Ian Carrig
Maurice Pickering	Holden VK Commodore SS Group A	36	(Australia) Maurice Pickering
Brian Callaghan	Holden VL Commodore SS Group A SV	37	(Australia) Brian Callaghan
Brian Callaghan	Holden VK Commodore SS Group A	43	(Australia) Brian Callaghan Jr
Tony Mulvihill	Holden VL Commodore SS Group A SV	41	(Australia) Tony Mulvihill
Matt Wacker	Holden VL Commodore SS Group A SV	42	(Australia) Matt Wacker
Paul Trevathan	Holden VL Commodore SS Group A	44	(Australia) Paul Trevathan
Lester Smerdon	Holden VL Commodore SS Group A SV	45	(Australia) Lester Smerdon (Australia) Graham Jonsson
Llynden Reithmuller	Holden VL Commodore SS Group A SV	46	(West Germany) Llynden Reithmuller
Garry Willmington Performance	Toyota Supra Turbo	47	(Australia) Garry Willmington
M3 Motorsport	BMW M3	52	(Australia) John Cotter
M3 Motorsport	BMW M3	53	(Australia) Peter Doulman
Mike Twigden	BMW 323i	53	(Australia) Mike Twigden
Playscape Racing	Ford Sierra RS500	55	(Australia) Kevin Waldock
Reda Awadullah	Holden VL Commodore SS Group A SV	69	(Egypt) Reda Awadullah
David Sala	Toyota Corolla E80	72	(Australia) Richard Vorst (Australia) David Sala
Alf Grant Racing	Toyota Corolla	74	(Australia) Alf Grant
Alf Grant Racing	Toyota Corolla	74	(Australia) Tim Grant
Bob Holden Motors	Toyota Corolla	76	(Australia) Matthew Springer
Geoff Full	Toyota Sprinter AE86	78	(Australia) Geoff Full
Daryl Hendrick	Holden VL Commodore SS Group A SV	86	(Australia) Daryl Hendrick
Alf Barbagallo	Holden VL Commodore SS Group A SV	96	(Australia) Alf Barbagallo
Car-Trek Racing	Holden VL Commodore SS Group A SV	98	(Australia) Bob Jones
Car-Trek Racing	Holden VL Commodore SS Group A SV	99	(Australia) Greg Crick (Australia) Joe Sommariva

== Season review ==
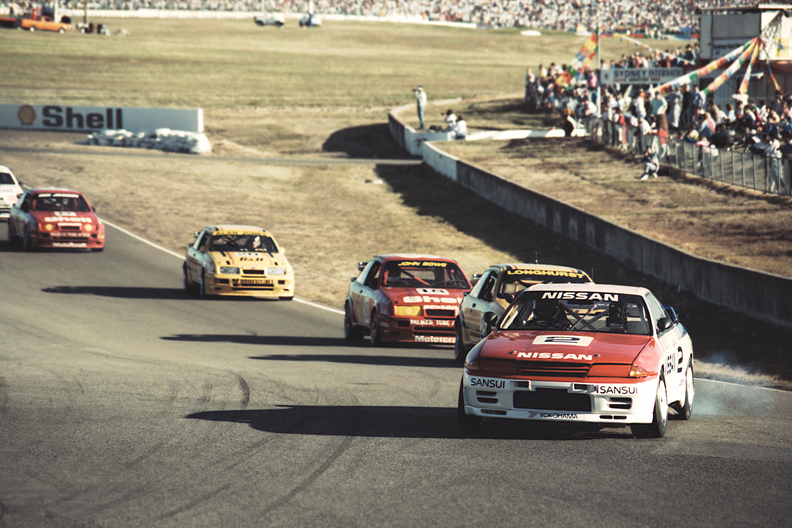
Jim Richards (Nissan Skyline GT-R) leads the opening lap of the Oran Park round of the 1990 Australian Touring Car Championship from Tony Longhurst (Ford Sierra RS500), John Bowe (Ford Sierra RS500), Alan Jones (Ford Sierra RS500), Dick Johnson (Ford Sierra RS500) and Peter Brock (Ford Sierra RS500).

The opening three rounds of the championship continued the story of the previous two seasons with the Ford Sierra RS500's of Dick Johnson Racing teammates Dick Johnson (winner of Symmons Plains and Phillip Island) and John Bowe dominating podiums with only the tight nature of the Amaroo Park layout giving another driver a look-in, namely the Nissan Skyline of Jim Richards who held off Bowe in a race long duel to win the season's opening round. Another tight track at Winton Motor Raceway gave Richards his second victory of the year with team-mates Tony Longhurst and Alan Jones putting their Benson & Hedges Sierras ahead of the DJR pair onto the podium (the Longhurst Sierra's were generally acknowledged as most powerful of the Blue Oval's cars at some 590 bhp (440 kW; 598 PS), though the extra power usually hurt the Sierra's skinny rear tyres and as team manager Frank Gardner put it a year later, "We usually started at the front and worked our way back"). Lakeside Raceway saw a complete upset with veteran Colin Bond winning his first ATCC race since 1978 from former teammate Peter Brock in his Mobil 1 Sierra and Holden Racing Team driver Win Percy in what would prove be Holden's only podium finish of the season. Englishman Percy, a former three time British Touring Car Champion, had taken over the role of team manager and lead driver of the HRT in 1990 and was contesting his first ATCC.

Colin Bond made it two in a row at Mallala after Mark Skaife's spectacular debut of Nissan's new 640 bhp (477 kW; 649 PS), 4WD, twin turbo Skyline R32 GT-R, which was nicknamed "Godzilla", ended with a broken hub after storming to the lead in the early laps. As at Lakeside, Bond's steady, though unspectacular race pace paid off and as others fell away, his Caltex Sierra emerged in front. Peter Brock broke through for his first victory of the year at Wanneroo despite driving with falling turbo boost pressure for the last half of the race which actually helped minimise his tyre wear, while a broken axle to Johnson at Wanneroo saw his points lead surrendered to Richards who finished fourth in his first race of the new GT-R.

Ahead of the Oran Park Raceway Grand Finale, Richards held a three-point lead over two-time defending champion Johnson, with Bond and Brock still a chance being eleven and twelve points behind respectively. Bowe, winless despite his form, was too far behind even if he won and all other contenders retired. Richards, again in the GT-R, dominated Oran Park, making the points calculations irrelevant. Second place allowed Brock to slip past Johnson and Bond into the series runner's up position. After a poor start by Brock, who proved to be the only Sierra driver capable of matching Richards in the Nissan (though his fastest lap time proved to be almost 2 seconds slower than the Nissan), Richards drove away from the field. Behind Bowe, Longhurst was sixth after an inconsistent season ahead of Glenn Seton's improving Sierra. Percy was the best of the Holdens in eighth ahead of Alan Jones and Gregg Hansford who only had a partial season in Allan Moffat's Eggenberger Motorsport built Sierra.

For the first time since the ATCC changed from a single race to a series of races in 1969, the ATCC did not appear in Melbourne with neither Sandown or Calder hosting a round. The Phillip Island circuit, revived in 1989 for the Australian motorcycle Grand Prix which was a round of the 1989 Grand Prix motorcycle World Championship, held its first ATCC race since 1977.

== Results and standings ==
=== Race results ===
The 1990 Australian Touring Car Championship consisted of 8 rounds with one race per round. Each race was slightly under one hour in duration.

Rd.	Circuit	Location / state	Date	Winning driver	Car	Team	Report
1	Amaroo Park Raceway	Sydney, New South Wales	23 – 25 Feb	(New Zealand) Jim Richards	Nissan Skyline HR31 GTS-R	Nissan Motorsport Australia	
2	Symmons Plains Raceway	Launceston, Tasmania	9 – 11 Mar	(Australia) Dick Johnson	Ford Sierra RS500	Shell Ultra-Hi Racing	
3	Phillip Island Grand Prix Circuit	Phillip Island, Victoria	23 – 25 Mar	(Australia) Dick Johnson	Ford Sierra RS500	Shell Ultra-Hi Racing	
4	Winton Motor Raceway	Benalla, Victoria	6 – 8 Apr	(New Zealand) Jim Richards	Nissan Skyline HR31 GTS-R	Nissan Motorsport Australia	
5	Lakeside International Raceway	Brisbane, Queensland	4 – 6 May	(Australia) Colin Bond	Ford Sierra RS500	Caltex CXT Racing	
6	Mallala Motor Sport Park	Mallala, South Australia	8 – 10 Jun	(Australia) Colin Bond	Ford Sierra RS500	Caltex CXT Racing	
7	Wanneroo Park	Perth, Western Australia	22 – 24 Jun	(Australia) Peter Brock	Ford Sierra RS500	Mobil 1 Racing	
8	Oran Park Raceway	Sydney, New South Wales	13 – 15 Jul	(New Zealand) Jim Richards	Nissan Skyline R32 GT-R	Nissan Motorsport Australia	

=== Championship standings ===
Points were awarded on a 20–15–12–10–8–6–4–3–2–1 basis for the first ten outright positions in each race. The best seven race results counted for each driver's total.

Pos.	Driver	Car	Ama	Sym	Phi	Win	Lak	Mal	Wan	Ora	Pts.
1	Jim Richards	Nissan Skyline HR31 GTS-R; Nissan Skyline R32 GT-R	1st	7th	3rd	1st	5th	3rd	4th	1st	102 (106)
2	Peter Brock	Ford Sierra RS500	5th	2nd	19th	9th	2nd	4th	1st	2nd	85
3	Dick Johnson	Ford Sierra RS500	3rd	1st	1st	5th	7th	2nd	Ret	7th	83
4	Colin Bond	Ford Sierra RS500	9th	6th	4th	8th	1st	1st	3rd	4th	81 (83)
5	John Bowe	Ford Sierra RS500	2nd	3rd	2nd	6th	4th	14th	6th	5th	72
6	Tony Longhurst	Ford Sierra RS500	4th	Ret	9th	2nd	8th	5th	Ret	9th	40
7	Glenn Seton	Ford Sierra RS500	12th	4th	Ret	4th	9th	Ret	2nd	Ret	37
8	Win Percy	Holden VL Commodore SS Group A SV	14th	9th	7th	Ret	3rd		5th	6th	32
9	Alan Jones	Ford Sierra RS500	8th	12th	6th	3rd	Ret	Ret	10th	Ret	22
10	Gregg Hansford	Ford Sierra RS500	6th	8th	5th	11th	Ret				17
11	Larry Perkins	Holden VL Commodore SS Group A SV	11th	10th	8th	7th	14th	7th	7th	Ret	16
12	Andrew Miedecke	Ford Sierra RS500	7th	5th	10th	12th	11th	Ret			13
13	George Fury	Ford Sierra RS500								3rd	12
14	Mark Skaife	Nissan Skyline HR31 GTS-R; Nissan Skyline R32 GT-R	Ret		DNS	Ret	6th	Ret	Ret	8th	9
15	Neil Crompton	Holden VL Commodore SS Group A SV						6th			6
16	Kevin Waldock	Ford Sierra RS500	16th	11th	15th	13th	Ret	8th	8th	Ret	6
17	Chris Lambden	Nissan Skyline HR31 GTS-R	15th	13th	14th	14th	10th	9th	11th	10th	4
18	Neville Crichton	Ford Sierra RS500							9th		2
19	Mark Gibbs	Holden VL Commodore SS Group A SV	10th			10th	22nd			22nd	2
20	Gerald Kay	Holden VL Commodore SS Group A SV	21st	15th	11th	20th	17th	10th	Ret	DNS	1
Pos.	Driver	Car	Ama	Sym	Phi	Win	Lak	Mal	Wan	Ora	Pts.

Colour	Result
Gold	Winner
Silver	Second place
Bronze	Third place
Green	Points classification
Blue	Non-points classification
Blue	Non-classified finish (NC)
Purple	Retired, not classified (Ret)
Red	Did not qualify (DNQ)
Red	Did not pre-qualify (DNPQ)
Black	Disqualified (DSQ)
White	Did not start (DNS)
White	Withdrew (WD)
White	Race cancelled (C)
Blank	Did not practice (DNP)
Blank	Did not arrive (DNA)
Blank	Excluded (EX)

== See also ==
1990 Australian Touring Car season
