= 1991 Australian Touring Car season =

Seasons
- ← 1990 1992 →

The 1991 Australian Touring Car season was the 32nd year of touring car racing in Australia since the first runnings of the Australian Touring Car Championship and the fore-runner of the present day Bathurst 1000, the Armstrong 500.

There were 12 touring car race meetings held during 1991; a nine-round series, the 1991 Australian Touring Car Championship (ATCC); a support programme event at the 1991 Australian Grand Prix and two long distance races, nicknamed 'enduros' which made up the 1991 Australian Endurance Championship.

== Season review ==
1991 was the low point for Group A touring car racing in Australia as grid numbers plunged in a harsh economic climate. Just eleven cars entered the Wanneroo round of the ATCC and just fifteen started the once prestigious Sandown 500.

On track the Touring Car Championship was dominated by the Gibson Motorsport prepared Nissan Skyline GT-Rs of Jim Richards and Mark Skaife. Tony Longhursts new 2.5 litre evolution spec BMW M3 was the only car to interrupt the clean sweep. A final round DNF for Richards was not enough to take the title away, despite Skaife scoring more points over the course of the season. With only the best eight results counting Richards won the championship by five points. Gibson Motor Sport did not appear at the Sandown 500, but Nissan still won through the Bob Forbes Racing car (built by Gibson) driven by Mark Gibbs and Formula Holden ace Rohan Onslow. Richards and Skaife then swept all before them at the 1991 Tooheys 1000, establishing a race record that stood until 2010. Third placing at Bathurst gave the Australian Endurance Championship to Gibbs and Onslow.

1991 also saw Peter Brock return to driving a Holden VN Commodore after a single season driving a BMW M3 (1988) and a Ford Sierra RS500 in 1989 and 1990. Brock's Mobil 1 Racing joined forces with Perkins Engineering run by his former Bathurst 1000 co-winner Larry Perkins to run a pair of the new Group A VN Commodore's.

== Results and standings ==
=== Race calendar ===
The 1991 Australian touring car season consisted of 12 events.

Date	Series	Circuit	City / state	Winner	Team	Car	Report
24 Feb	ATCC Round 1	Sandown International Raceway	Melbourne, Victoria	Jim Richards	Nissan Motorsport Australia	Nissan Skyline R32 GT-R	
10 Mar	ATCC Round 2	Symmons Plains Raceway	Launceston, Tasmania	Jim Richards	Nissan Motorsport Australia	Nissan Skyline R32 GT-R	
14 Apr	ATCC Round 3	Barbagallo Raceway	Perth, Western Australia	Mark Skaife	Nissan Motorsport Australia	Nissan Skyline R32 GT-R	
28 Apr	ATCC Round 4	Lakeside International Raceway	Brisbane, Queensland	Jim Richards	Nissan Motorsport Australia	Nissan Skyline R32 GT-R	
5 May	ATCC Round 5	Winton Motor Raceway	Benalla, Victoria	Jim Richards	Nissan Motorsport Australia	Nissan Skyline R32 GT-R	
2 Jun	ATCC Round 6	Amaroo Park	Sydney, New South Wales	Tony Longhurst	Benson & Hedges Racing	BMW M3 Evolution	
23 Jun	ATCC Round 7	Mallala Motor Sport Park	Mallala, South Australia	Mark Skaife	Nissan Motorsport Australia	Nissan Skyline R32 GT-R	
14 Jul	ATCC Round 8	Lakeside International Raceway	Brisbane, Queensland	Tony Longhurst	Benson & Hedges Racing	BMW M3 Evolution	
11 Aug	ATCC Round 9	Oran Park Raceway	Sydney, New South Wales	Mark Skaife	Nissan Motorsport Australia	Nissan Skyline R32 GT-R	
8 Sep	Don't Drink Drive Sandown 500	Sandown International Raceway	Melbourne, Victoria	Mark Gibbs; Rohan Onslow	Bob Forbes Racing	Nissan Skyline R32 GT-R	report
6 Oct	Tooheys 1000	Mount Panorama Circuit	Bathurst, New South Wales	Jim Richards; Mark Skaife	Nissan Motorsport Australia	Nissan Skyline R32 GT-R	report
3 Nov	Hush Puppies Olympic Group A Challenge	Adelaide Street Circuit	Adelaide, South Australia	Jim Richards	Nissan Motorsport Australia	Nissan Skyline R32 GT-R	

=== Hush Puppies Olympic Group A Challenge ===
This meeting was a support event of the 1991 Australian Grand Prix.

Driver	No.	Team	Car	Race 1	Race 2
(New Zealand) Jim Richards	1	Nissan Motorsport Australia	Nissan Skyline R32 GT-R	1	1
(Australia) Glenn Seton	30	Peter Jackson Racing	Ford Sierra RS500	3	2
(Australia) Larry Perkins	11	Mobil 1 Racing	Holden VN Commodore SS Group A SV	6	3
(Australia) John Bowe	18	Shell Ultra-Hi Racing	Ford Sierra RS500	9	4
(Australia) Peter Brock	05	Mobil 1 Racing	Holden VN Commodore SS Group A SV	7	5
(Australia) Dick Johnson	17	Shell Ultra-Hi Racing	Ford Sierra RS500	8	6
(Australia) Colin Bond	8	Caltex CXT Racing	Ford Sierra RS500	10	7
(Australia) Alan Jones	20	Benson & Hedges Racing	BMW M3 Evolution	5	8
(Australia) Graham Moore	42	Perkins Engineering	Holden VN Commodore SS Group A SV		9
(Australia) Peter Gazzard	13	Captain Peter Janson	Holden VL Commodore SS Group A SV		10
(Indonesia) Chandra Alim		Indonesian Racing Team	Holden VL Commodore SS Group A SV		11
(Australia) Bob Jones	21	Ampol Max 3 Racing	Holden VL Commodore SS Group A SV		12
(Australia) John Cotter	52	M3 Motorsport	BMW M3		DNF
(Indonesia) Hutomo Mandala Putra		Indonesian Racing Team	Holden VN Commodore SS Group A SV		DNF
(United Kingdom) Win Percy	16	Holden Racing Team	Holden VN Commodore SS Group A SV	2	DNF
(Australia) Tony Longhurst	25	Benson & Hedges Racing	BMW M3 Evolution	4	DNF
