= 1993 Australian Touring Car season =

Motor racing competition

Seasons
- ← 1992 1994 →

The 1993 Australian Touring Car season was the 34th year of touring car racing in Australia since the first runnings of the Australian Touring Car Championship and the fore-runner of the present day Bathurst 1000, the Armstrong 500.

There were 15 touring car race meetings held during 1993; a nine-round series, the 1993 Australian Touring Car Championship (ATCC); a three-round series based at Amaroo Park; the Aurora AFX AMSCAR series (AMSCAR), a support programme event at the 1993 Australian Grand Prix, two stand alone long distance races, nicknamed 'enduros'; the Winfield Triple Challenge at Eastern Creek Raceway.

== Results and standings ==
=== Race calendar ===
The 1993 Australian touring car season consisted of 15 events.

Date	Series	Circuit	City / state	Winner	Team	Car	Report
24 Jan	Winfield Triple Challenge	Eastern Creek Raceway	Sydney, New South Wales	Glenn Seton	Peter Jackson Racing	Ford EB Falcon	
28 Feb	ATCC Round 1 AMSCAR Round 1	Amaroo Park	Sydney, New South Wales	John Bowe	Shell Racing	Ford EB Falcon	
14 Mar	ATCC Round 2	Symmons Plains Raceway	Launceston, Tasmania	Alan Jones	Peter Jackson Racing	Ford EB Falcon	
4 Apr	ATCC Round 3	Phillip Island Grand Prix Circuit	Phillip Island, Victoria	Glenn Seton	Peter Jackson Racing	Ford EB Falcon	
18 Apr	ATCC Round 4	Lakeside International Raceway	Brisbane, Queensland	Alan Jones	Peter Jackson Racing	Ford EB Falcon	
16 May	ATCC Round 5	Winton Motor Raceway	Benalla, Victoria	Glenn Seton	Peter Jackson Racing	Ford EB Falcon	
6 Jun	ATCC Round 6	Eastern Creek Raceway	Sydney, New South Wales	Glenn Seton	Peter Jackson Racing	Ford EB Falcon	
20 Jun	AMSCAR Round 2	Amaroo Park	Sydney, New South Wales	Mark Skaife	Winfield Racing Team	Holden VP Commodore	
4 Jul	ATCC Round 7	Mallala Motor Sport Park	Mallala, South Australia	Glenn Seton	Peter Jackson Racing	Ford EB Falcon	
11 Jul	ATCC Round 8	Barbagallo Raceway	Perth, Western Australia	Jim Richards	Winfield Racing Team	Holden VP Commodore	
25 Jul	AMSCAR Round 3	Amaroo Park	Sydney, New South Wales	Paul Morris	Benson & Hedges Racing	BMW M3 Evolution	
8 Aug	ATCC Round 9	Oran Park Raceway	Sydney, New South Wales	Jim Richards	Winfield Racing Team	Holden VP Commodore	
12 Sep	Sandown 500	Sandown International Raceway	Melbourne, Victoria	David Parsons; Geoff Brabham	Peter Jackson Racing	Ford EB Falcon	report
4 Oct	Tooheys 1000	Mount Panorama Circuit	Bathurst, New South Wales	Larry Perkins; Gregg Hansford	Castrol Team Perkins	Holden VP Commodore	report
6 - 7 Nov	Ultimate Peter Jackson Dash	Adelaide Street Circuit	Adelaide, South Australia	Wayne Gardner	Holden Racing Team	Holden VP Commodore	

=== Winfield Triple Challenge ===
Held at Eastern Creek Raceway this was a pre-season race meeting which featured Superbikes and Drag Racing to complete the Winfield Triple Challenge.

Driver	No.	Team	Car	Race 1	Race 2	Points
(Australia) Glenn Seton	30	Peter Jackson Racing	Ford EB Falcon	1	1	40
(Australia) Larry Perkins	11	Perkins Engineering	Holden VL Commodore SS Group A SV	2	2	38
(New Zealand) Jim Richards	2	Winfield Racing Team	Holden VP Commodore	3	4	35
(Australia) Bob Pearson	33	Pro-Duct Motorsport	Holden VP Commodore	6	5	31
(Australia) Bruce Stewart	7	Pro-Duct Motorsport	Holden VP Commodore	5	6	31
(Australia) Kevin Heffernan	50	PACE Racing	Holden VL Commodore SS Group A SV	8	7	27
(Australia) Terry Finnigan	27	Terry Finnigan Racing	Holden VN Commodore SS Group A	7	8	27
(Australia) Stuart McColl	44	Stuart McColl	Holden VL Commodore SS Group A SV	10	9	23
(Australia) Mike Conway	79	Cadillac Productions	Toyota Sprinter	11	13	19
(Australia) Peter Brock	05	Mobil 1 Racing	Holden VP Commodore	DNF	3	18
(Australia) Frank Binding	75		Toyota Corolla	12	12	18
(Australia) Steve Reed	3	Lansvale Racing Team	Holden VP Commodore	4	DNF	17
(Australia) Brad Wright	78		Toyota Corolla	13	14	15
(Australia) Laurie Donaher	26		Holden VL Commodore SS Group A SV	9	DNF	12
(Australia) Glenn Mason	42		Holden VL Commodore SS Group A SV	DNF	10	11
(Australia) Ray Gulson	45	Ray Gulson	BMW 635 CSi	DNF	11	10
(Australia) John Cotter	53	M3 Motorsport	BMW M3	DNS	DNS	

=== Ultimate Peter Jackson Dash ===
This meeting was a support event of the 1993 Australian Grand Prix.

Driver	No.	Team	Car	Race 1	Race 2
(Australia) Wayne Gardner	16	Holden Racing Team	Holden VP Commodore	4	1
(New Zealand) Jim Richards	2	Winfield Racing Team	Holden VP Commodore	3	2
(Australia) John Bowe	18	Shell Racing	Ford EB Falcon	6	3
(Australia) Peter Brock	05	Mobil 1 Racing	Holden VP Commodore	7	4
(Australia) Glenn Seton	30	Peter Jackson Racing	Ford EB Falcon	DNF	5
(Australia) Troy Dunstan	55	Pepsi Quix Racing	Holden VP Commodore	DNF	6
(Australia) Alan Jones	35	Peter Jackson Racing	Ford EB Falcon	5	7
(Australia) Bob Jones	12	Ampol Max 3 Racing	Holden VP Commodore	10	8
(Australia) Stuart McColl	4	GIO Racing	Holden VP Commodore	9	9
(Australia) Larry Perkins	11	Castrol Perkins Racing	Holden VP Commodore	1	10
(Australia) Trevor Ashby	3	Lansvale Racing Team	Holden VP Commodore	8	11
(Australia) Mark Skaife	1	Winfield Racing Team	Holden VP Commodore	2	DNF
(Australia) Tomas Mezera	15	Holden Racing Team	Holden VP Commodore	DNF	DNS
