= 1991 Australian Endurance Championship =

The 1991 Australian Endurance Championship was a CAMS sanctioned Australian motor racing title open to Group 3A Touring Cars. The championship, which was the eighth running of the Australian Endurance Championship, began on 8 September 1991 at Sandown Raceway and ended on 6 October at the Mount Panorama Circuit after two rounds. The title was won by Mark Gibbs and Rohan Onslow who shared a Bob Forbes Racing Nissan Skyline GT-R. The 1991 Australian Manufacturers' Championship, which was run concurrently with the Endurance Championship, was awarded to the Nissan Motor Co (Australia).

== Teams and drivers ==
The following teams and drivers competed in the 1991 Australian Endurance Championship and the 1991 Australian Manufacturers' Championship.

Team	Car	No	Driver
Nissan Motorsport Australia	Nissan Skyline R32 GT-R	1	(New Zealand) Jim Richards (Australia) Mark Skaife
Nissan Motorsport Australia	Nissan Skyline R32 GT-R	2	(Australia) Drew Price (Australia) Garry Waldon (Australia) Mark Skaife
Lansvale Racing Team	Holden VN Commodore SS Group A SV	3	(Australia) Trevor Ashby (Australia) Steve Reed
Bob Forbes Racing	Nissan Skyline R32 GT-R	4	(Australia) Mark Gibbs (Australia) Rohan Onslow
Bob Forbes Racing	Holden VN Commodore SS Group A SV	22	(Australia) Graham Moore (Belgium) Michel Delcourt
Perkins Engineering	Holden VN Commodore SS Group A SV	05	(Australia) Peter Brock (Australia) Andrew Miedecke
Perkins Engineering	Holden VN Commodore SS Group A SV	11	(Australia) Larry Perkins (Australia) Tomas Mezera
Alf Grant Racing	Nissan Skyline HR31 GTS-R	6	(Australia) Alf Grant (Australia) Tim Grant
Holden Racing Team	Holden VN Commodore SS Group A SV	7	(Australia) Brad Jones (Australia) Neil Crompton
Holden Racing Team	Holden VN Commodore SS Group A SV	16	(United Kingdom) Win Percy (Australia) Allan Grice
Caltex CXT Racing	Ford Sierra RS500	8	(Australia) Colin Bond (New Zealand) Graeme Crosby
Allan Moffat Racing	Ford Sierra RS500	9	(Australia) Gary Brabham (New Zealand) Steve Millen
Allan Moffat Racing	Ford Sierra RS500	10	(Australia) Charlie O'Brien (Italy) Gianfranco Brancatelli
John Holmes Motorsport	Ford Sierra RS500	12	(Australia) Ray Lintott (Australia) Tony Scott (Australia) John English
Captain Peter Janson	Holden VL Commodore SS Group A SV	13	(United Kingdom) Peter Janson (Australia) Peter Gazzard
Warren Jonsson	Holden VL Commodore SS Group A SV	14	(Australia) Warren Jonsson (Australia) Graham Jonsson
Toyota Team Australia	Toyota Supra Turbo	15	(Australia) John Smith (Australia) Geoff Morgan
Toyota Team Australia	Toyota Corolla FX-GT	70	(Australia) Neal Bates (Australia) Rick Bates
Toyota Team Australia	Toyota Corolla FX-GT	71	(Australia) Ron Searle (Australia) Don Griffiths
Dick Johnson Racing	Ford Sierra RS500	17	(Australia) Dick Johnson (Australia) John Bowe
Dick Johnson Racing	Ford Sierra RS500	18	(New Zealand) Paul Radisich (Australia) Terry Shiel (Australia) John Bowe
Dick Johnson Racing	Ford Sierra RS500	19	(New Zealand) Kayne Scott (New Zealand) Gregg Taylor
Benson & Hedges Racing	BMW M3 Evolution	20	(New Zealand) Denny Hulme (Australia) Peter Fitzgerald
Benson & Hedges Racing	BMW M3 Evolution	25	(Australia) Peter Fitzgerald (Australia) Tony Longhurst (Australia) Alan Jones
Bob Jones	Holden VL Commodore SS Group A SV	21	(Australia) Bob Jones (New Zealand) Ed Lamont (Australia) Mike Imrie
Laurie Donaher	Holden VL Commodore SS Group A SV	24	(Australia) Laurie Donaher (Australia) Mick Donaher
Daryl Hendrick	Holden VL Commodore SS Group A SV	26	(Australia) Daryl Hendrick (United Kingdom) Chris Lambden (Australia) John White
Terry Finnigan	Holden VN Commodore SS Group A SV	27	(Australia) Terry Finnigan (Australia) Geoff Leeds
Playscape Racing	Ford Sierra RS500	28	(Australia) Kevin Waldock (Australia) Brett Peters
Glenn Seton Racing	Ford Sierra RS500	30	(Australia) Glenn Seton (Australia) Gregg Hansford
Glenn Seton Racing	Ford Sierra RS500	35	(Australia) David 'Skippy' Parsons (Australia) Wayne Park
Peter Hudson	Holden VL Commodore SS Group A SV	31	(Australia) Peter Hudson (Australia) Ian Carrig (Australia) Ian Clark
Pro-Duct Motorsport	Holden VN Commodore SS Group A SV	32	(Australia) Bob Tindal (Australia) Darren Stewart
Pro-Duct Motorsport	Holden VN Commodore SS Group A SV	33	(Australia) Bob Pearson (Australia) Bruce Stewart
Ray Gulson	BMW 635CSi	34	(Australia) Ray Gulson (Australia) Graham Gulson
Ron Masing	Mitsubishi Starion Turbo	36	(Australia) Ron Masing (Australia) Greville Arnel
Everlast Battery Service	Holden VL Commodore SS Group A SV	39	(Australia) Bill O'Brien (Australia) Brian Callaghan (Australia) Brian Callaghan Jr
Garry Willmington Performance	Toyota Supra Turbo A	41	(Australia) Garry Willmington (Egypt) Reda Awadullah
Brian Bolwell	Ford Sierra RS500	43	(Australia) Brian Bolwell (Australia) Arthur Abrahams
Brian Bolwell	Ford Sierra RS500	44	(New Zealand) Dave Barrow (New Zealand) Glenn McIntyre
Bryan Sala	Ford Sierra RS500	50	(Australia) Bryan Sala (Australia) Graham Lusty
M3 Motorsport	BMW M3	52	(Australia) Peter Doulman (Australia) John Cotter
Kiwi Motorsport	BMW M3	54	(New Zealand) Keith Sharp (New Zealand) Ian Spurle (Tanzania) Edgar Salwegter
David Sala	Toyota Corolla	72	(Australia) David Sala (Australia) Brad Stratton
Bob Holden Motors	Toyota Corolla	73	(Australia) Bob Holden (Finland) Rauno Aaltonen (Australia) Dennis Rogers
Bob Holden Motors	Toyota Sprinter AE86	75	(Australia) Ted Dunford (Australia) Brad Wright
Bob Holden Motors	Toyota Sprinter AE86	76	(Australia) Mike Conway (Australia) Calvin Cardiner
Bob Holden Motors	Toyota Corolla	77	(Australia) Geoff Forshaw (Australia) Richard Vorst
Peter Verheyen	Toyota Sprinter AE86	74	(Australia) Peter Verheyen (Australia) John Vernon
Speedtech Motorsport	Toyota Sprinter AE86	78	(Australia) Geoff Full (Australia) Paul Morris

== Race calendar ==
The 1991 Australian Endurance Championship and the 1991 Australian Manufacturers' Championship were contested concurrently over a two round series with one race per round.

Rd.	Race title	Circuit	City / state	Date	Winners	Car	Team	Report
1	(Australia) Don’t Drink Drive Sandown 500	Sandown Raceway	Melbourne, Victoria	8 September	(Australia) Mark Gibbs (Australia) Rohan Onslow	Nissan Skyline R32 GT-R	Bob Forbes Racing	Report
2	(Australia) Tooheys 1000	Mount Panorama	Bathurst, New South Wales	6 October	(New Zealand) Jim Richards (Australia) Mark Skaife	Nissan Skyline R32 GT-R	Nissan Motorsport Australia	Report

== Results ==
=== Australian Endurance Championship ===
Position	Driver	Sandown	Bathurst	Points
1	Mark Gibbs	1st	3rd	
1	Rohan Onslow	1st	3rd	
Position	Driver	Sandown	Bathurst	Points

Note: Other placings in the Endurance Championship have not been ascertained.

=== Australian Manufacturers Championship ===
Position	Manufacturer	Sandown	Bathurst	Points
1	Nissan Motor Co (Australia)	1st	1st	
Position	Manufacturer	Sandown	Bathurst	Points

Note: Other placings in the Manufacturers' Championship have not been ascertained.
