= 1992 Australian Touring Car Championship =

Motor racing competition

Seasons
- ← 1991 1993 →

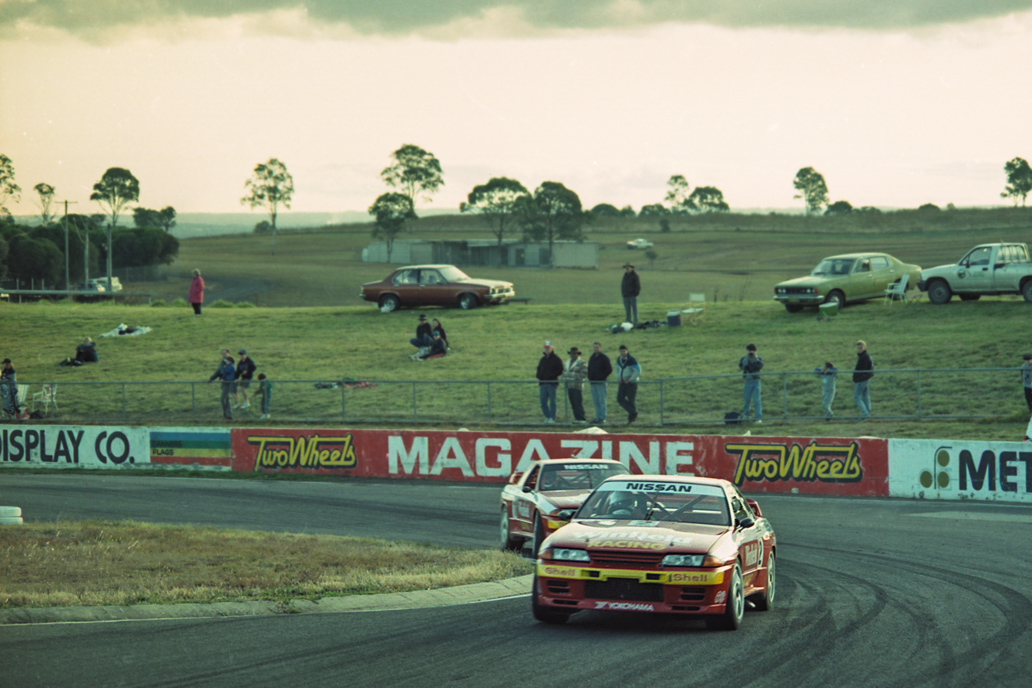
Mark Skaife leads teammate Jim Richards at the Oran Park round, on his way to securing the 1992 Australian Touring Car Championship.

The 1992 Australian Touring Car Championship was an Australian motor racing competition for Group 3A Touring Cars, commonly known as Group A cars. It was sanctioned by the Confederation of Australian Motor Sport as an Australian National Title. The championship began on 23 February at Amaroo Park Raceway and ended on 21 June at Oran Park Raceway after nine rounds. It was the 33rd running of the Australian Touring Car Championship.

Mark Skaife, driving a Nissan Skyline GT-R for Gibson Motorsport, won his first Australian Touring Car Championship. His teammate and defending series champion Jim Richards finished second, with BMW M3 driver Tony Longhurst in third place.

Although Mark Skaife was the overall winner of the opening round at Amaroo Park, Peter Brock's win in Heat 1 of the round in his Mobil 1 Racing Holden VN Commodore SS Group A was the first race win by a Holden in the ATCC since Brock had won Round 6 of the 1986 ATCC at Surfers Paradise.

In an effort to reduce costs and to even out the cars, CAMS imposed a number of changes for 1992. Notably, the Holden Commodores and Ford Sierra RS500's were restricted to a 7,500 rev limit and the BMW M3's had an extra 50 kg added to their minimum weight limit.

However the biggest change came to the Nissan GT-R's. Before the start of the season the cars were given an extra 40 kg, bringing them up to a total of 1400 kg. CAMS also directed that the cars were to run Formula One style pop-off valves on the twin turbos to restrict their power, bringing them down from 1991's 640 bhp (477 kW; 649 PS) to around 450 bhp (336 kW; 456 PS). Gibson Motorsport continually protested against the imposed penalties on the car (after winning the ATCC the cars were given an extra 100 kg to bring them 1500), and even took CAMS to court (unsuccessfully) in a bid to be able to run the GT-R as they were in 1991 claiming that they were no longer competitive. However most saw this as a false claim since the team won both the ATCC and the Tooheys 1000.

== Teams and drivers ==
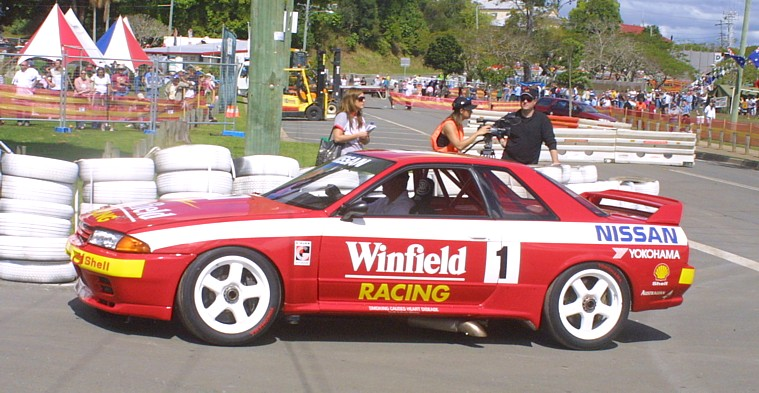
Jim Richards Nissan GT-R

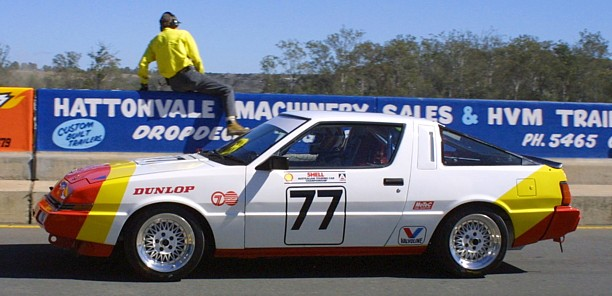
Stephen Bell Mitsubishi Starion

The following teams and drivers competed in the championship:

Team	Manufacturer	Car model	No	Driver
Winfield Team Nissan	Nissan	Skyline R32 GT-R	1	(New Zealand) Jim Richards
Winfield Team Nissan	Nissan	Skyline R32 GT-R	2	(Australia) Mark Skaife
Lansvale Racing Team	Holden	VN Commodore SS Group A SV	3	(Australia) Trevor Ashby (Australia) Steve Reed
GIO Racing	Nissan	Skyline R32 GT-R	4	(Australia) Mark Gibbs
GIO Racing	Holden	VN Commodore SS Group A SV	21	(Australia) Mark Gibbs (Australia) Rohan Onslow
Mobil 1 Racing	Holden	VN Commodore SS Group A SV	05	(Australia) Peter Brock
Mobil 1 Racing	Holden	VN Commodore SS Group A SV	7	(Australia) Neil Crompton
Alf Grant	Nissan	Skyline HR31 GTS-R	6	(Australia) Tim Grant
Caltex CXT Racing	Ford	Sierra RS500	8	(Australia) Colin Bond
Perkins Engineering	Holden	VL Commodore SS Group A SV	11	(Australia) Larry Perkins
Ampol Max 3 Racing	Holden	VL Commodore SS Group A SV	12	(Australia) Bob Jones
Warren Jonsson	Holden	VL Commodore SS Group A SV	14	(Australia) Warren Jonsson
Shell Ultra-Hi Racing	Ford	Sierra RS500	17	(Australia) Dick Johnson
Shell Ultra-Hi Racing	Ford	Sierra RS500	18	(Australia) John Bowe
Benson & Hedges Racing	BMW	M3 Evolution II	20	(Australia) Alan Jones
Benson & Hedges Racing	BMW	M3 Evolution II	23	(Australia) Paul Morris
Benson & Hedges Racing	BMW	M3 Evolution II	25	(Australia) Tony Longhurst
Wayne Douglass	Holden	VL Commodore SS Group A SV	22	(Australia) John English
Terry Finnigan	Holden	VN Commodore SS Group A SV	27	(Australia) Terry Finnigan
Playscape Racing	Ford	Sierra RS500	28	(Australia) Kevin Waldock
Peter Jackson Racing	Ford	Sierra RS500	30	(Australia) Glenn Seton
Peter Jackson Racing	Ford	Sierra RS500	35	(Australia) Wayne Park (Australia) David Parsons
Phil Johnson	Holden	VL Commodore SS Group A SV	31	(Australia) Phil Johnson
Pro-Duct Racing	Holden	VN Commodore SS Group A SV	33	(Australia) Bob Pearson
Ron Masing	Mitsubishi	Starion	36	(Australia) Ron Masing
Brian Callaghan	Holden	VL Commodore SS Group A SV	37	(Australia) Brian Callaghan Jr.
Challenge Motorsport	Holden	VL Commodore SS Group A SV	39	(Australia) Chris Smerdon
John Leeson	Holden	VL Commodore SS Group A SV	40	(Australia) John Leeson
Daily Planet Racing	Holden	VL Commodore SS Group A SV	41	(Australia) Andrew Harris
Garry Willmington Performance	Toyota	Supra Turbo	41	(Australia) Garry Willmington
Stuart McColl	Holden	VL Commodore SS Group A SV	44	(Australia) Stuart McColl
Ian Love	Holden	VL Commodore SS Group A SV	45	(Australia) Ian Love
Bryan Sala	Ford	Sierra RS500	50	(Australia) Bryan Sala
Mike Steele	Ford	Sierra RS500	55	(Australia) Mike Steele
Holden Racing Team	Holden	VN Commodore SS Group A SV	61	(Australia) Tomas Mezera
Reda Awadullah	Holden	VL Commodore SS Group A SV	68	(Egypt) Reda Awadullah
Adrian Brooke	Toyota	Corolla SX	72	(Australia) Brad Stratton
Frank Binding	Toyota	Corolla SX	74	(Australia) Frank Binding
Barbagallo Motorsport	Holden	VN Commodore SS Group A SV	77	(Australia) Alf Barbagallo
John Holmes	Toyota	Corolla SX	78	(Australia) John Holmes
Scotty Taylor Racing	Mitsubishi	Starion	86	(Australia) Stephen Bell
Malcolm Rea	Toyota	Sprinter	88	(Australia) Malcolm Rea

== Championship calendar ==
The championship was contested over a nine rounds series in six different states with two heats per round.

Rd.	Circuit	Location / state	Date
1	Amaroo Park Raceway	Sydney, New South Wales	21 - 23 Feb
2	Sandown International Raceway	Melbourne, Victoria	6 - 8 Mar
3	Symmons Plains Raceway	Launceston, Tasmania	13 - 15 Mar
4	Winton Motor Raceway	Benalla, Victoria	3 - 5 Apr
5	Lakeside International Raceway	Brisbane, Queensland	1–3 May
6	Eastern Creek Raceway	Sydney, New South Wales	22–24 May
7	Mallala Motor Sport Park	Mallala, South Australia	29–31 May
8	Wanneroo Raceway	Perth, Western Australia	5 - 7 Jun
9	Oran Park Raceway	Sydney, New South Wales	19 - 21 Jun

== Season summary ==
Round	Race	Event	Pole position	Race winners	Winning team	Round winner	Report
1	R1	Amaroo	(New Zealand) Jim Richards	(Australia) Peter Brock	Advantage Racing	(Australia) Mark Skaife (Gibson Motorsport)	
1	R2	Amaroo		(Australia) Mark Skaife	Gibson Motorsport	(Australia) Mark Skaife (Gibson Motorsport)	
2	R1	Sandown	(New Zealand) Jim Richards	(Australia) John Bowe	Dick Johnson Racing	(Australia) John Bowe (Dick Johnson Racing)	
2	R2	Sandown		(Australia) John Bowe	Dick Johnson Racing	(Australia) John Bowe (Dick Johnson Racing)	
3	R1	Launceston	(Australia) Dick Johnson	(Australia) Glenn Seton	Glenn Seton Racing	(Australia) Glenn Seton (Glenn Seton Racing)	
3	R2	Launceston		(Australia) Glenn Seton	Glenn Seton Racing	(Australia) Glenn Seton (Glenn Seton Racing)	
4	R1	Winton	(Australia) Mark Skaife	(Australia) Mark Skaife	Gibson Motorsport	(Australia) Mark Skaife (Gibson Motorsport)	
4	R2	Winton		(Australia) Mark Skaife	Gibson Motorsport	(Australia) Mark Skaife (Gibson Motorsport)	
5	R1	Lakeside	(Australia) Tony Longhurst	(Australia) Tony Longhurst	LoGaMo Racing	(Australia) Tony Longhurst (LoGaMo Racing)	
5	R2	Lakeside		(Australia) Tony Longhurst	LoGaMo Racing	(Australia) Tony Longhurst (LoGaMo Racing)	
6	R1	Eastern Creek	(Australia) Dick Johnson	(Australia) John Bowe	Dick Johnson Racing	(Australia) John Bowe (Dick Johnson Racing)	
6	R2	Eastern Creek		(Australia) John Bowe	Dick Johnson Racing	(Australia) John Bowe (Dick Johnson Racing)	
7	R1	Mallala	(Australia) John Bowe	(Australia) Mark Skaife	Gibson Motorsport	(Australia) Mark Skaife (Gibson Motorsport)	
7	R2	Mallala		(Australia) Mark Skaife	Gibson Motorsport	(Australia) Mark Skaife (Gibson Motorsport)	
8	R1	Perth	(Australia) John Bowe	(Australia) John Bowe	Dick Johnson Racing	(Australia) John Bowe (Dick Johnson Racing)	
8	R2	Perth		(Australia) John Bowe	Dick Johnson Racing	(Australia) John Bowe (Dick Johnson Racing)	
9	R1	Oran Park	(Australia) John Bowe	(Australia) Mark Skaife	Gibson Motorsport	(Australia) Mark Skaife (Gibson Motorsport)	
9	R2	Oran Park		(Australia) Mark Skaife	Gibson Motorsport	(Australia) Mark Skaife (Gibson Motorsport)	

== Points system ==
Points were awarded on a 30-27-24-21-19-17-15-14-13-12-11-10-9-8-7-6-5-4-3-2 basis to the top twenty drivers at each round. Round positions were determined by applying the same points structure to each of the two heats and ranking the drivers by the total. In the event of two or more drivers having the same total, the round placing was determined by the finishing order in the second heat.

== Championship standings ==
Pos	Driver	Car	Ama.	San.	Sym.	Win.	Lak.	Eas.	Mal.	Wan.	Ora.	Points
1	Mark Skaife	Nissan R32 Skyline GT-R	1st	2nd	2nd	1st	5th	2nd	1st	8th	1st	234
2	Jim Richards	Nissan R32 Skyline GT-R	2nd	3rd	4th	2nd	2nd	4th	9th	2nd	2nd	214
3	Tony Longhurst	BMW E30 M3	14th	10th	5th	4th	1st	3rd	2nd	3rd	5th	184
4	John Bowe	Ford Sierra RS500	7th	1st	Ret	7th	4th	1st	4th	1st	9th	175
5	Glenn Seton	Ford Sierra RS500	4th	7th	1st	3rd	8th	5th	6th	5th	8th	173
6	Mark Gibbs	Nissan R32 Skyline GT-R & Holden VN Commodore SS Group A SV	5th	4th	6th	9th	16th	7th	3rd	11th	4th	147
7	Alan Jones	BMW E30 M3	11th	18th	8th	6th	3rd	6th	7th	6th	3rd	143
8	Dick Johnson	Ford Sierra RS500	8th	5th	3rd	11th	12th	13th	8th	4th	10th	134
9	Paul Morris	BMW E30 M3	9th	12th	11th	8th	6th	9th	10th	9th	6th	120
10	Larry Perkins	Holden VL Commodore SS Group A SV		8th		5th	7th	11th	5th	7th	7th	108
11	Peter Brock	Holden VN Commodore SS Group A SV	3rd	6th	10th	13th	9th	8th			11th	100
12	Colin Bond	Ford Sierra RS500	10th	16th	9th	16th	11th	15th	12th	10th	13th	86
13	Wayne Park	Ford Sierra RS500	12th	14th	12th	10th	14th	10th	11th	14th		79
14	Trevor Ashby	Holden VN Commodore SS Group A SV	6th			12th		12th				37
15	Steve Reed	Holden VN Commodore SS Group A SV		11th			13th				12th	30
16	Tomas Mezera	Holden VN Commodore SS Group A SV		13th			10th	14th				29
16	Bob Jones	Holden VL Commodore SS Group A SV		15th		17th	22nd	16th	Ret	16th	17th	29
18	Neil Crompton	Holden VN Commodore SS Group A SV	Ret	9th	7th	DNS						28
18	Terry Finnigan	Holden VN Commodore SS Group A SV	13th	17th		15th	15th	Ret				28
20	Stuart McColl	Holden VL Commodore SS Group A SV						18th	14th		15th	19
21	Tim Grant	Nissan R31 Skyline GTS-R	18th			14th	18th					16
22	John English	Holden VL Commodore SS Group A SV					19th	17th			16th	14
23	Chris Smerdon	Holden VL Commodore SS Group A SV				19th			13th			12
24	Alf Barbagallo	Holden VN Commodore SS Group A SV								12th		10
25	Stephen Bell	Mitsubishi Starion			13th							9
25	Ian Love	Holden VN Commodore SS Group A SV								13th		9
27	David Parsons	Ford Sierra RS500									14th	8
28	Bob Pearson	Holden VN Commodore SS Group A SV	15th					DNS				7
28	Phil Johnson	Holden VL Commodore SS Group A SV								15th		7
28	Bryan Sala	Ford Sierra RS500		19th		18th						7
31	Brian Callaghan Jr.	Holden VL Commodore SS Group A SV	16th									6
32	Frank Binding	Toyota Corolla	17th				24th					5
32	Kevin Waldock	Ford Sierra RS500					17th					5
34	John Holmes	Toyota Corolla	19th	DNS		DNS						3
34	Rohan Onslow	Holden VN Commodore SS Group A SV						19th				3
36	Warren Jonsson	Holden VL Commodore SS Group A SV					20th					2
Pos	Driver	Car	Ama.	San.	Sym.	Win.	Lak.	Eas.	Mal.	Wan.	Ora.	Pts

Colour	Result
Gold	Winner
Silver	Second place
Bronze	Third place
Green	Points classification
Blue	Non-points classification
Blue	Non-classified finish (NC)
Purple	Retired, not classified (Ret)
Red	Did not qualify (DNQ)
Red	Did not pre-qualify (DNPQ)
Black	Disqualified (DSQ)
White	Did not start (DNS)
White	Withdrew (WD)
White	Race cancelled (C)
Blank	Did not practice (DNP)
Blank	Did not arrive (DNA)
Blank	Excluded (EX)

== See also ==
1992 Australian Touring Car season
