= 1991 Drink Drive Sandown 500 =

Track map of the Sandown Raceway

The 1991 Drink Drive Sandown 500 was an endurance race for Group 3A Touring Cars. The event was held on 8 September 1991 at the Sandown circuit in Victoria, Australia over 161 laps of the 3.10 km "long" circuit, totalling 499 km. The race was the first round of both the 1991 Australian Endurance Championship and the 1991 Australian Manufacturers' Championship.

The race was won by first time winners Mark Gibbs and Rohan Onslow driving for the Bob Forbes Corporation Pty. Ltd. in just their second race since taking delivery of their new Gibson Motorsport developed Nissan Skyline GT-R. There were six classified finishers, the smallest number in the history of the Sandown 500 touring car race.

== Qualifying results ==
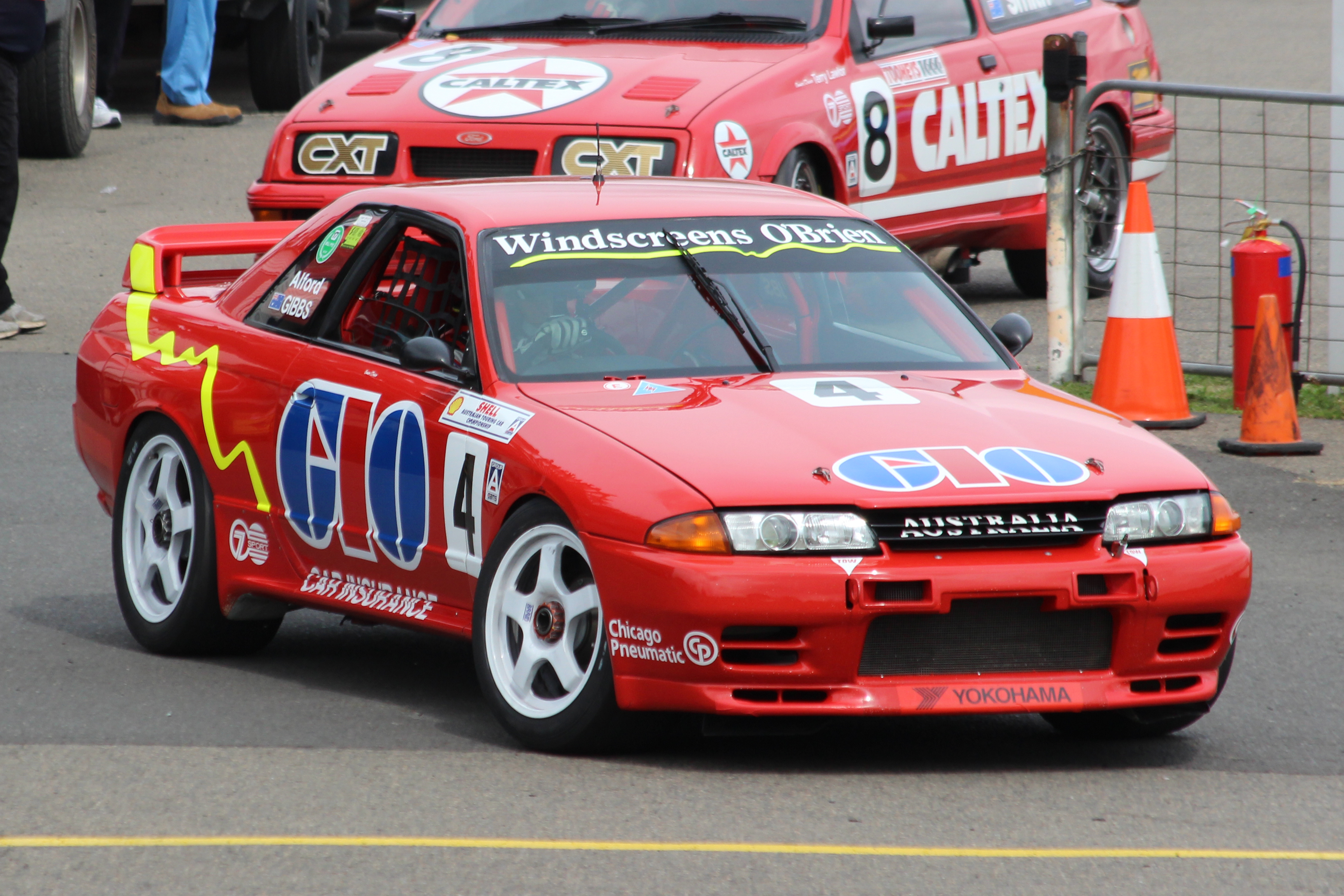
The race winning Nissan Skyline R32 GT-R, pictured in 2015

| Pos | No | Entrant | Drivers | Car | Time |
|---|---|---|---|---|---|
| 1 | 30 | Peter Jackson Racing | (Australia) Glenn Seton (Australia) Gregg Hansford | Ford Sierra RS500 | 1:14.17 |
| 2 | 4 | Bob Forbes Corporation Pty. Ltd. | (Australia) Mark Gibbs (Australia) Rohan Onslow | Nissan Skyline R32 GT-R | 1:14.66 |
| 3 | 05 | Mobil 1 Racing | (Australia) Peter Brock (Australia) Andrew Miedecke | Holden VN Commodore SS Group A SV | 1:14.67 |
| 4 | 11 | Mobil 1 Racing | (Australia) Larry Perkins (Australia) Tomas Mezera | Holden VN Commodore SS Group A SV | 1:14.73 |
| 5 | 16 | Holden Racing Team | (United Kingdom) Win Percy (Australia) Allan Grice | Holden VN Commodore SS Group A SV | 1:15.38 |
| 6 | 28 | Playscape Racing | (Australia) Kevin Waldock (Australia) Brett Peters | Ford Sierra RS500 | 1:16.39 |
| 7 | 16 | Holden Racing Team | (Australia) Neil Crompton (Australia) Brad Jones | Holden VN Commodore SS Group A SV | 1:16.43 |
| 8 | 25 | Benson & Hedges Racing | (Australia) Alan Jones (Australia) Peter Fitzgerald | BMW M3 Evolution | 1:17.27 |
| 9 | 26 | Gemspares | (Australia) Daryl Hendrick (Australia) John White | Holden VL Commodore SS Group A SV | |
| 10 | 13 | Car Trek Racing Pty. Ltd. | (Australia) Bob Jones (New Zealand) Ed Lamont | Holden VL Commodore SS Group A SV | |
| 11 | 50 | Bryan Sala | (Australia) Bryan Sala (Australia) Graham Lusty | Ford Sierra RS500 | |
| 12 | 71 | John Smith | (Australia) Ron Searle (Australia) Don Griffiths | Toyota Corolla | |
| 13 | 78 | Speedtech Motor Sport | (Australia) Geoff Full (Australia) Paul Morris | Toyota Sprinter | |
| 14 | 31 | Car Trek Racing Pty. Ltd. | (Australia) Peter Hudson (Australia) Ian Carrig (Australia) Ian Clark | Holden VL Commodore SS Group A SV | |
| 15 | 76 | Bob Holden Motors | (Australia) Mike Conway (Australia) Calvin Gardiner | Toyota Sprinter | |
| 16 | 13 | Bob Holden Motors | (Australia) Bob Holden (Australia) Dennis Rogers | Toyota Corolla | |

== Race results ==
| Pos. | Class | No. | Entrant | Drivers | Car | Laps |
|---|---|---|---|---|---|---|
| 1 | A | 4 | Bob Forbes Corporation Pty. Ltd. | (Australia) Mark Gibbs (Australia) Rohan Onslow | Nissan Skyline R32 GT-R | 161 |
| 2 | B | 25 | Benson & Hedges Racing | (Australia) Alan Jones (Australia) Peter Fitzgerald | BMW M3 Evolution | 155 |
| 3 | A | 28 | Playscape Racing | (Australia) Kevin Waldock (Australia) Brett Peters | Ford Sierra RS500 | 152 |
| 4 | A | 26 | Gemspares | (Australia) Daryl Hendrick (Australia) John White | Holden VL Commodore SS Group A SV | 144 |
| 5 | C | 71 | John Smith | (Australia) Ron Searle (Australia) Don Griffiths | Toyota Corolla | 141 |
| 6 | C | 78 | Speedtech Motor Sport | (Australia) Geoff Full (Australia) Paul Morris | Toyota Sprinter | 122 |
| DNF | A | 30 | Peter Jackson Racing | (Australia) Glenn Seton (Australia) Gregg Hansford | Ford Sierra RS500 | 146 |
| DNF | A | 05 | Mobil 1 Racing | (Australia) Peter Brock (Australia) Andrew Miedecke (Australia) Tomas Mezera | Holden VN Commodore SS Group A SV | 133 |
| DNF | A | 21 | Car Trek Racing Pty. Ltd. | (Australia) Bob Jones (New Zealand) Ed Lamont | Holden VL Commodore SS Group A SV | 122 |
| DNF | A | 7 | Holden Racing Team | (Australia) Neil Crompton (Australia) Brad Jones | Holden VN Commodore SS Group A SV | 103 |
| DNF | A | 11 | Mobil 1 Racing | (Australia) Larry Perkins (Australia) Peter Brock (Australia) Tomas Mezera | Holden VN Commodore SS Group A SV | 103 |
| DNF | C | 13 | Bob Holden Motors | (Australia) Bob Holden (Australia) Dennis Rogers | Toyota Corolla | 103 |
| DNF | A | 16 | Holden Racing Team | (United Kingdom) Win Percy (Australia) Allan Grice | Holden VN Commodore SS Group A SV | 101 |
| NC | C | 76 | Bob Holden Motors | (Australia) Mike Conway (Australia) Calvin Gardiner | Toyota Sprinter | 97 |
| DNF | A | 31 | Car Trek Racing Pty. Ltd. | (Australia) Peter Hudson (Australia) Ian Carrig (Australia) Ian Clark | Holden VL Commodore SS Group A SV | 56 |
| DNS | A | 50 | Bryan Sala | (Australia) Bryan Sala (Australia) Graham Lusty | Ford Sierra RS500 | |

== Statistics ==
- Pole Position - 1:14.17 - #30 Glenn Seton - Ford Sierra RS500
- Fastest Lap - 1:15.74 - #4 Mark Gibbs - Nissan Skyline R32 GT-R

== See also ==
1991 Australian Touring Car season

| Preceded by 1990 Sandown 500 | Sandown 500; 1991 | Succeeded by 1992 Don't Drink Drive Sandown 500 |
