= 1992 Australian Touring Car season =

Seasons
- ← 1991 1993 →

The 1992 Australian Touring Car season was the 33rd year of touring car racing in Australia since the first runnings of the Australian Touring Car Championship and the fore-runner of the present day Bathurst 1000, the Armstrong 500.

There were 13 touring car race meetings held during 1992; a nine-round series, the 1992 Australian Touring Car Championship (ATCC); a support programme event at the 1992 Australian Grand Prix, the Winfield Triple Challenge at Eastern Creek Raceway, and two stand alone long distance races, nicknamed 'enduros'.

1992 was the last year of the FIA's Group A touring cars in Australia. Group A, which had been Australia's touring car category since 1985, was to be replaced by the 5.0 Litre V8 Group 3A Touring Cars (the fore-runner of V8 Supercars) from 1993. This would see the end of turbocharged cars in Australian touring car racing, with cars such as the Nissan Skyline GT-R and Ford Sierra RS500 banned from racing at the end of 1992.

The 1993 spec cars made their first appearance in the 1992 Don't Drink Drive Sandown 500, with three Holden VP Commodores and one Ford EB Falcon being raced. The Falcon, which had not raced at all in Group A in Australia, had not been seen in touring car racing since the final year of the locally developed Group C category in 1984.

== Results and standings ==
=== Race calendar ===
The 1992 Australian touring car season consisted of 13 events.

Date	Series / Event	Circuit	Location/ state	Winner	Team	Car	Report
26 Jan	Winfield Triple Challenge	Eastern Creek Raceway	Sydney, New South Wales	Glenn Seton	Peter Jackson Racing	Ford Sierra RS500	
23 Feb	ATCC Round 1	Amaroo Park	Sydney, New South Wales	Mark Skaife	Winfield Team Nissan	Nissan Skyline R32 GT-R	
8 Mar	ATCC Round 2	Sandown International Raceway	Melbourne, Victoria	John Bowe	Shell Ultra-Hi Racing	Ford Sierra RS500	
15 Mar	ATCC Round 3	Symmons Plains Raceway	Launceston, Tasmania	Glenn Seton	Peter Jackson Racing	Ford Sierra RS500	
5 Apr	ATCC Round 4	Winton Motor Raceway	Benalla, Victoria	Mark Skaife	Winfield Team Nissan	Nissan Skyline R32 GT-R	
3 May	ATCC Round 5	Lakeside International Raceway	Brisbane, Queensland	Tony Longhurst	Benson & Hedges Racing	BMW M3 Evolution	
24 May	ATCC Round 6	Eastern Creek Raceway	Sydney, New South Wales	John Bowe	Shell Ultra-Hi Racing	Ford Sierra RS500	
31 May	ATCC Round 7	Mallala Motor Sport Park	Mallala, South Australia	Mark Skaife	Winfield Team Nissan	Nissan Skyline R32 GT-R	
7 Jun	ATCC Round 8	Barbagallo Raceway	Perth, Western Australia	John Bowe	Shell Ultra-Hi Racing	Ford Sierra RS500	
21 Jun	ATCC Round 9	Oran Park Raceway	Sydney, New South Wales	Mark Skaife	Winfield Team Nissan	Nissan Skyline R32 GT-R	
13 Sep	Don't Drink Drive Sandown 500	Sandown International Raceway	Melbourne, Victoria	Larry Perkins; Steve Harrington	Bob Jane T-Marts Perkins Racing	Holden VL Commodore SS Group A SV	report
4 Oct	Tooheys 1000	Mount Panorama Circuit	Bathurst, New South Wales	Mark Skaife; Jim Richards	Winfield Team Nissan	Nissan Skyline R32 GT-R	report
8 Nov	Clarks Shoes Group A Finale	Adelaide Street Circuit	Adelaide, South Australia	Jim Richards	Winfield Team Nissan	Nissan Skyline R32 GT-R	

=== Winfield Triple Challenge ===
Held at Eastern Creek Raceway this was a pre-season race meeting which featured superbikes and drag racing as well as touring cars to complete the Winfield Triple Challenge. Glenn Seton won both of the two Group 3A races.

=== Clarks Shoes Group A Finale ===
This meeting was a support event of the 1992 Australian Grand Prix.

Driver	No.	Team	Car	Race 1	Race 2
(New Zealand) Jim Richards	1	Winfield Team Nissan	Nissan Skyline R32 GT-R	1	1
(Australia) John Bowe	18	Shell Ultra-Hi Racing	Ford Sierra RS500	2	2
(Australia) Larry Perkins	11	Bob Jane T-Marts Perkins Racing	Holden VL Commodore SS Group A SV	4	3
(Australia) Tomas Mezera	15	Holden Racing Team	Holden VP Commodore	5	4
(Australia) Brad Jones	16	Holden Racing Team	Holden VP Commodore	9	5
(Australia) Tony Longhurst	25	Benson & Hedges Racing	BMW E30 M3 Evolution	3	6
(Australia) Rohan Onslow	4	GIO Racing	Nissan Skyline R32 GT-R	7	7
(Australia) Colin Bond	8	Caltex CXT Racing	Ford Sierra RS500	DNF	8
(Australia) Dick Johnson	17	Shell Ultra-Hi Racing	Ford EB Falcon	11	9
(Australia) Paul Morris	23	Benson & Hedges Racing	BMW E36 325i	8	10
(Australia) Peter Brock	05	Mobil 1 Racing	Holden VP Commodore	6	DNF
(Australia) Graham Moore	42	Bob Forbes Racing	Holden VN Commodore SS Group A SV	22	DNF
(Australia) Stuart McColl	44	Stuart McColl	Holden VL Commodore SS Group A SV	10	
(Australia) Alan Jones	35	Peter Jackson Racing	Ford Sierra RS500	DNF	DNF
(Australia) Glenn Seton	30	Peter Jackson Racing	Ford EB Falcon	DNF	DNS
