= SS Group A =

SS Group A may refer to any of the following automobiles marketed by Holden in Australia.

- Holden VK Commodore SS Group A
- Holden VL Commodore SS Group A
- Holden VL Commodore SS Group A SV
- Holden VN Commodore SS Group A SV
