= Winfield (cigarette) =

Australian cigarette brand

- Product type: Cigarette
- Current owner: British American Tobacco
- Produced by: BAT Australia
- Country: Australia
- Introduced: 1972
- Markets: See below
- Tagline: "...anyhow, have a Winfield", "Australia's own since 1972", "The Genuine Australian"

Winfield is an Australian brand of cigarettes, currently owned by multinational company British American Tobacco. Cigarettes are manufactured and imported by British American Tobacco Australia (BATA), a subsidiary of British American Tobacco.

== History ==
Winfield was first launched in 1972. Winfield has been mainly sold in Australia and New Zealand, but was also sold in Papua New Guinea, Singapore, Malaysia, Canada, Luxembourg, Belgium, the Netherlands, Germany, France, Austria, Italy and South Africa.

In 2004, British American Tobacco Australia shipped 853 billion Winfield cigarettes, which made it the second largest tobacco company and Winfield the largest brand in Australia before Altria and Longbeach. Both BATA and Philip Morris International had a 40% market share in the Australian cigarette market.

In response to court enforceable undertakings by the Australian Competition & Consumer Commission (ACCC) in 2005, the major tobacco companies removed the terms 'light' and 'mild' from their packaging. The undertakings by the ACCC also required BATA to not make claims about the health benefits of low yield cigarettes when compared to high yield cigarettes, and pay $4 million AUD to the ACCC to fund anti-smoking consumer education campaigns and programs concerning low yield cigarettes. There was also a similar action taken against Imperial Tobacco which required a $1 million to the ACCC AUD.

As of 2016, no tobacco products are manufactured in Australia. British American Tobacco, responsible for the Winfield brand, stopped doing so in 2015.

In 2017–18, the total revenue of the Australian tobacco product wholesaling market was $2.7 billion AUD, of which BATA comrpised $1.79 billion AUD. Factory-made cigarettes comprised 87.7% of the wholesale tobacco market, roll-your-own tobacco was 11.0%, and the remaining 1.3% consistent of other tobacco products including cigars, cigarillos and pipe tobacco.

== Sport sponsorship ==
Winfield was a major sponsor of sport in Australia until outlawed by the Tobacco Advertising Prohibition Act 1992 that banned all tobacco advertising and sponsorship starting from December 1995 onwards. Some limited exemptions were granted for the Australian Grand Prix and the Australian Open Golf, hence Winfield was seen at the Australian Grand Prix in 1998 and 1999 when it was the title sponsor of the Williams F1 Team.

=== Auto sponsorship ===
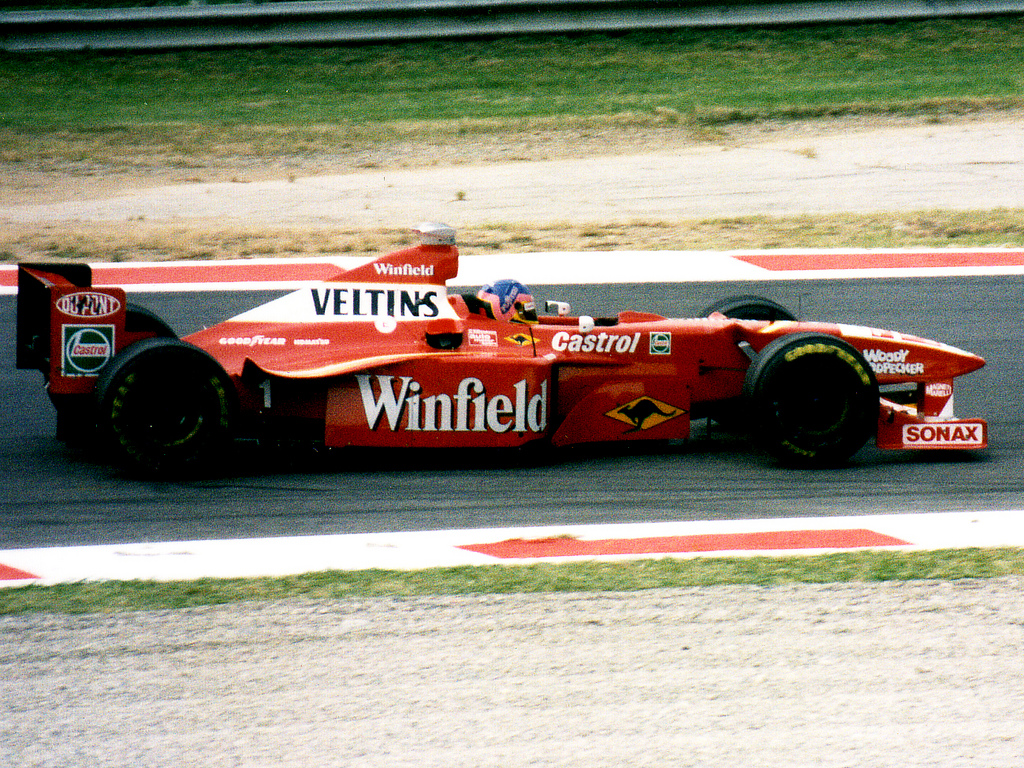
Jacques Villeneuve in the Williams FW20 at the 1998 Italian Grand Prix

Winfield was the main sponsor of the Williams F1 Team in 1998 and 1999. The sponsorship was part of the deal Williams signed with the then-parent company of Winfield, Rothmans International, whose flagship brand had sponsored the multi-time world championship team since 1994. Among the drivers who ran under the Winfield colors for Williams were former world champion Jacques Villeneuve and former IndyCar Series champion Alex Zanardi. The arrangement came to an end following the 1999 season as British American Tobacco had purchased Rothmans International, and since they were already owners of their own Formula 1 operation, they chose instead to focus their sponsorship on their own team.

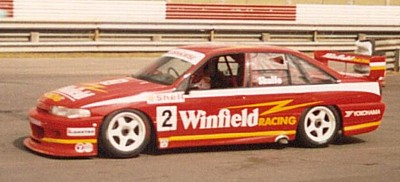
Gibson Motorsport Holden Commodore VP of Mark Skaife at Lakeside International Raceway in April 1994

From 1992 until 1995, Winfield was the title sponsor of the Australian motor racing team Gibson Motorsport. Highlights included Mark Skaife winning two Australian Touring Car Championships in 1992 and 1994, as well as the Australian Drivers' Championship in 1992 and 1993. Skaife and Jim Richards also won the 1992 Bathurst 1000.

The banning of tobacco sponsorship before the 1996 season has been laid down as a significant contributor to Gibson Motorsports demise since its glory days of the early 1990s with the team folding during the 2003 season, despite a Bathurst win in 1999, never achieving the same level of results.

From the 1970s until 1995, Winfield sponsored a number of high-profile teams in Speedway and Drag racing.

=== Motor sponsorship ===
Winfield also sponsored the Honda Team in the Australian Superbike Championship from 1986 until 1995. Malcolm Campbell won the 1986, 1989 and 1990 editions in the Winfield-sponsored Honda VFR750F and Honda VFR750R bikes. and later Troy Corser and Anthony Gobert would also win the 1994 and 1995 editions with their Honda RC30 and Honda RC45 bikes. After the Tobacco Advertising Prohibition Act 1992 was passed, Winfield no longer sponsored the team.

Winfield also sponsored the regular Superbike World Championship in 1994 and 1995, as well as the annual Winfield Triple Challenge at Eastern Creek each January between 1992 and 1995.

=== Other sponsorship ===
From 1982 until 1995, it was the title sponsor of the New South Wales Rugby League premiership with the winner of the grand final receiving the Winfield Cup. It also sponsored both test and club/franchise international rugby union in South Africa from 1995 until 1999 when tobacco advertising was prohibited there.

== Controversy ==
=== Fake cigarettes containing more tobacco ===
In 2011, it was reported that various fake Winfield cigarettes were smuggled into Australia and sold onto the black market.

Independent tests were carried out on a pack of Winfield Blues from both a real version and an illegal copy made in Asia and smuggled into Australia to be sold on the black market. The real Winfield Blues weighed 0.58g, whereas the fakes weighed 0.66g. The real ones lost 87 percent of their weight when smoked, while the fakes lost only 84 percent. The tests - performed by chemist firm Sharp and Howells and commissioned by The Daily Telegraph - appear to discredit claims that fake cigarettes are significantly different or more dangerous than the real product. "The fake Winfield Blues come up higher." Sharp and Howells laboratory manager John Franceschini said. "The genuine Winfield Blues and the fake Intershop ones were quite similar."

A spokesman for British American Tobacco Australia, the maker of Winfield, said the tests were not exhaustive enough to determine true quality, although he acknowledged there was no such thing as a safe cigarette. "At the end of the day, smoking is harmful regardless of whether it's legal or illegal." the BATA spokesman said. "The issue with illegal tobacco is that 100 percent of the profits go to the pockets of criminals while 70 percent of the legal product sale goes to taxpayers through tobacco excise and tax."

== Winfield products ==
The table below is a summary of the complete Winfield product line in Australia. Whilst different descriptors may be used, the red and blue varieties are typically always available in all markets where Winfield is sold. Furthermore, in some markets, Winfield appears in a standard pack size of 30 or 20, whereas 25 used to be the standard in Australia. Winfield's were available in packs of 20, 25, and 30 in Australia. As of April 1, 2024, laws made in Australia enforced that cigarette packets are only allowed to be sold in sizes of 20; therefore, it is the only size Winfield's are now available in.

French pack of Winfield

Hard Pack (King Size 25's & 20's)	Soft Pack (King Size 20's) ^{1}	Charcoal Filter (King Size 25's)	Roll-Your-Own (20g and 50g)
Winfield Red (16 mg)	Winfield Red	Winfield Red	Winfield Red
Winfield Blue (12 mg)	Winfield Blue	Winfield Blue	Winfield Blue Winfield Yellow Export
Winfield Gold (8 mg)	Winfield Gold	Winfield Gold	Winfield Gold
Winfield Sky Blue (6 mg)	Winfield Sky Blue	Winfield Sky Blue	
Winfield Grey (4 mg)			
Winfield White (1 mg)			
Winfield Menthol (8 mg)			
Winfield Cool Menthol (4 mg)

Notes

^{1} (No longer available since 2008)

Tar content is shown after the product name.

Also, BATA is the only manufacturer to have clear "use by" date codes on their packets, unlike ITA and PMI, which use codes only known in the industry.

== See also ==
- Tobacco smoking
- Longbeach (cigarette)
