= Bob Forbes Racing =

- Manufacturer: Holden (1988-93); Nissan (1991-92)
- Team Principal: Bob Forbes
- Race Drivers: Kevin Bartlett (1988, 1990); John Harvey (1988); Mark Gibbs (1989-93); Rohan Onslow (1989-92); Russell Ingall (1990); Neil Crompton (1993)
- Chassis: Holden Commodore (VL, VN, VP); Nissan GT-R
- Debut: 1988
- 13th

Bob Forbes Racing was an Australian motor racing team that competed in the Australian Touring Car Championship between 1988 and 1993.

== History ==
Bob Forbes Racing was founded in 1988 by former Australian touring car competitor Bob Forbes. A partially completed Perkins Engineering Holden Commodore VL shell was purchased, with the team debuting at the 1988 Bathurst 1000 with Kevin Bartlett and John Harvey driving.

In 1989, the team competed at selected East Coast rounds with Mark Gibbs driving. For the endurance races, Rohan Onslow joined the team with GIO joining as naming rights sponsor at the same time. After competing at most of the East Coast rounds in 1990, a second Commodore VL was entered at the Bathurst 1000 for Bartlett and Russell Ingall.

Gibbs started the 1991 season in a VL, a VN was debuted. Bob Forbes then purchased a Nissan GT-R from Gibson Motorsport. Gibbs and Onslow won the Sandown 500 and finished third at the Bathurst 1000. In 1992, Gibbs competed in all races.

With Gibbs stepping back from full-time driving, Neil Crompton joined the team. The team's Commodore VN was converted to VP specifications to compete in the 1993 season. A new VP was debuted at the Oran Park round. At the end of 1993, the team was sold to Wayne Gardner and became Wayne Gardner Racing.

Bob Forbes would later return to the sport, initially as entrant for a Commodore VS for his son Rodney, and later as the owner of 00 Motorsport.
