= LoGaMo Racing =

Australian motor racing team

- Manufacturer: Ford; BMW; Holden
- Team Principal: Frank Gardner; Tony Longhurst
- Race Drivers: Tony Longhurst (1988–94); Tomas Mezera (1988); Neville Crichton (1989, 1990); Denny Hulme (1989–92); Alan Jones (1989–92); Mark McLaughlin (1990); Peter Fitzgerald (1991, 1993); Paul Morris (1992–94); Johnny Cecotto (1992); John Blanchard (1993–94); Geoff Full (1993); Steve Soper (1993); Joachim Winkelhock (1993); Charlie O'Brien (1994)
- Chassis: Ford Sierra RS500; BMW M3; BMW 320i Holden Commodore VP
- Debut: 1988
- Drivers' Championships: 0
- Round wins: 4
- Race wins: 6

LoGaMo Racing, also known as Tony Longhurst Racing, was an Australian motor racing team that competed in Australian touring car racing between 1988 and 1994. The team was initially a collaboration between Tony Longhurst and Frank Gardner, with Terry Morris later joining as a shareholder, with their three names combining to create the LoGaMo name. The team won the 1988 Bathurst 1000 with Longhurst and Tomas Mezera.

== Background ==
At the end of 1987 Frank Gardner closed his JPS Team BMW operation, having decided to retire after a period of ill health. Lead driver Jim Richards, who had won two championships for the team, and the BMW M3s moved to Peter Brock's Mobil 1 Racing team. For 1988, Tony Longhurst, who had raced the second JPS BMW M3, formed his own team on the Gold Coast, which was initially known as Tony Longhurst Racing. Frank Gardner was listed as a consultant to the new team, but as the 1988 season progressed, he assumed the team manager's role and would become a shareholder in the team.

== History ==
=== Freeport Motorsport ===
Going into 1988, the team entered a single Ford Sierra RS500 for Longhurst. However, over the previous off-season Gardner had led the successful protest against the factory-backed Eggenberger Motorsport Ford Sierras at the 1987 Bathurst 1000, which had ultimately cost the Ford the World Touring Car Championship. This made it difficult for the team to source components through Ford in Europe, with endurance co-driver Tomas Mezera who was based in London at the time, trying to source components.

Longhurst would finish the championship in fifth position, finishing only four of the nine rounds, including a win at the Lakeside round after Dick Johnson was given a one-minute penalty for a false start.

=== Benson & Hedges Racing ===
From the Sandown 500 onwards, Amatil's Benson & Hedges brand was applied, Longhurst and Mezera going on to win the 1988 Bathurst 1000. It was the first Bathurst 1000 win for both drivers, and also the first for Gardner as team manager, who failed to win the race in his otherwise successful JPS Team BMW era. The winning car now resides in the National Motor Racing Museum near the circuit.

In 1989, the team expanded to two cars with Neville Crichton driving a second Sierra. In 1990, Alan Jones replaced Crichton in the second car. In both years, Longhurst would again finish in the top six of the championship. In 1990, Gardner established a Performance Driving Centre at Norwell with the team's workshop incorporated. In 1991, Gardner rekindled his links to BMW and the team became the marque's factory team, acquiring a pair of ex Schnitzer Motorsport BMW M3s. Longhurst won two rounds at Amaroo Park and Lakeside and finished third in the championship. From 1989 to 1991, Longhurst also won three consecutive AMSCAR title at Amaroo Park for the team.

In 1992, Longhurst won a third round at Lakeside and again finished third in the championship. A third M3 was also entered at selected events in 1992 for Paul Morris whose father Terry would become a shareholder in the team, completing the triumvirate of owners to create the LoGaMo name. At the 1992 Bathurst 1000, Formula One world champion Denny Hulme suffered a heart attack and died while co-driving with Morris. In 1993, despite the championship's move towards a Ford versus Holden formula, the team expanded to field four M3s, with John Blanchard replacing Alan Jones in the second Benson & Hedges car, and Paul Morris and Geoff Full racing with Diet Coke sponsorship.

By 1994, BMW was no longer eligible for the five-litre ATCC and LoGaMo committed to race in the 1994 Australian Manufacturers' Championship with a pair of two-litre BMW 320is. However, with the series at one stage in doubt, and a desire by sponsors to retain a presence in the country's main category, two Perkins Engineering built Holden Commodore VPs were purchased with Longhurst and Morris racing in both the two-litre and five-litre series. Longhurst won one race at the Barbagallo round but both him and Morris finished outside the top ten of the ATCC, with the team skipping the Phillip Island round entirely to focus on the Manufacturers' Championship.

Meanwhile in the Manufacturers Championship, the team finished first second and third with their three entrants, with Longhurst taking the title. However, the year was perhaps best remembered for team-mates Longhurst and Morris colliding on the pit straight at Winton. Longhurst blamed Morris for the crash, which had put both cars into the concrete wall, and punched him through his driver's side window.

== Demise ==
Heading into 1995, Longhurst wished to continue in the ATCC while Gardner and Morris wanted to stick with the two-litre Super Touring Championship. At the end of 1994, Gardner and Morris bought Longhurst out, with the latter forming Longhurst Racing to race a Ford Falcon EF in the 1995 ATCC season, a team which continued in the championship until 1999. Gardner continued with the Morris family to form Paul Morris Motorsport. Gardner retired soon after and sold the Performance Driving Centre in Norwell to Morris, who continues to use the facility as a base, including for a return to the ATCC (which had become known as V8 Supercars) from 2000 to 2012.

== See also ==
- JPS Team BMW
- Longhurst Racing
- Paul Morris Motorsport
