= Holden Commodore (VL) SS Group A SV =

Homologation special car by Holden Special Vehicles

Holden Commodore VL SS Group A SV
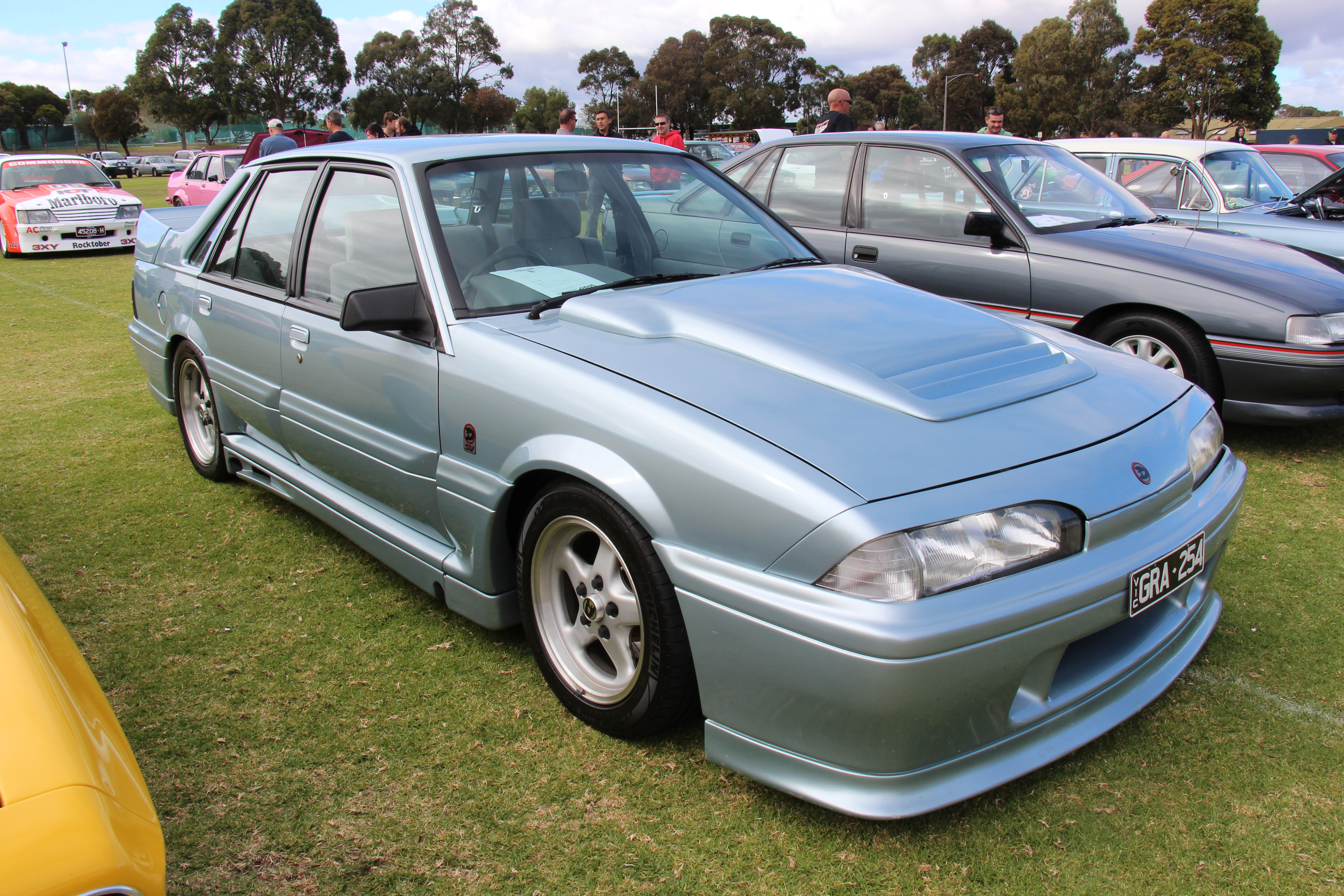
- 1986 VL SS Group A SV

Overview
- Manufacturer: Holden Special Vehicles
- Production: 1988
- Assembly: Notting Hill, Victoria

Body and chassis
- Class: Mid-size
- Body style: 4-door sedan
- Platform: GM V platform
- Related: Holden Commodore VL

Powertrain
- Engine: 5.0 liter Holden 304
- Transmission: 5-Speed BorgWarner BT5G manual

Chronology
- Predecessor: HDT VL SS Group A
- Successor: HSV VN SS Group A

The Holden Commodore (VL) SS Group A SV was a limited run homologation special car produced by Holden Special Vehicles (HSV) for Group A racing. It was unveiled at the 1987 Sydney Motor Show. It was the first model produced by HSV.

Based on the Holden Commodore VL built at the Holden Elizabeth Plant, it was only produced with 'Panorama Silver' paintwork. It had a 5.0-litre Holden V8 engine producing 180 kW (241 hp) and 380 N⋅m (280 lb⋅ft) of torque. It was only available with a five-speed manual transmission, a 0–100 km/h (0–62 mph) acceleration of 6.7 seconds, and quarter mile (402 metres) time of 14.9 seconds, and had a large rear spoiler. It was the first V8 model to use fuel injection.

Wind tunnel testing for the car was conducted in England by Tom Walkinshaw Racing.

The original production run of 500 was increased to 750 due to demand. News of the Holden Commodore VN release caused demand for the additional 250 units to slow.
