= 1987 Yokohama/Bob Jane T-Marts 300 =

Layout using both the road course and the oval

The 1987 Yokohama/Bob Jane T-Marts 300 was an endurance race for Group A touring cars held at the Calder Park Raceway in Melbourne, Australia on the rarely used combined circuit which incorporated both the recently redeveloped road course and the newly completed NASCAR-style “Thunderdome” oval (and was in fact the first time the Thunderdome was used for any type of motor racing). The combined oval/road course was 4.216 km (2.620 mi) long and the race was run over 70 laps.

The race took place on 9 August 1987.

The race, which attracted 20 starters and was the first ever run on the combined road course / oval circuit, was won by the Peter Jackson Nissan Racing turbo Skyline DR30 RS of John Bowe and Terry Shiel. For Bowe, the 1984 and 1985 CAMS Gold Star winner and the 1986 Australian Sports Car Champion, it was his first touring car victory after coming close numerous times in the 1986 Australian Touring Car Championship in the Volvo Dealer Teams Volvo 240T. Bowe started the race in the Nissan and later joined the Channel 7 commentary team for the concluding stages, unashamedly cheering "You beauty" when Shiel took the lead on the last lap. The Skyline used for the event was actually the team's spare car that had rarely seen any racing and in fact had spent the majority of its time as a static display car in various shopping centres throughout the country. Second was Larry Perkins and Canberra's Bill O'Brien in O'Brien's brand new Perkins Engineering built Holden VL Commodore SS Group A. After a tangle while lapping the New Zealand BMW M3 of Graham Lorimer which damaged the Commodore's steering, Perkins drove all but the last 2 laps of the race. The car was passed by Shiel soon after O'Brien exited the pits on the last lap through the Thunderdome and had to settle for second place. Finishing in third were Australian sprintcar stars Tony Noske and Garry Rush in Noske's ex-Perkins Holden VK Commodore SS Group A.

The race was missing some of the big names in Australian touring car racing, namely Peter Brock's Melbourne based Holden Dealer Team who now being privateers and not backed by Holden were saving money by not attending both Brock and Moffat had attended the Spa 24 hours the previous weekend both the Holden Dealer Team and Allan Moffat Racing's Commodores were travelling back from Europe to Australia by boat, and Dick Johnson's Brisbane based Shell team who were busy converting their 1987 ATCC Ford Sierra RS Cosworth's into the newly homologated Ford Sierra RS500 in readiness for the Castrol 500 at Sandown just over a month later as well as the all-important James Hardie 1000 at Bathurst which in 1987 was a round of the World Touring Car Championship. The race was attended however by the Peter Jackson Nissan team who fronted with one car for their endurance co-drivers Bowe and Shiel, Roadways Racing with their VL Commodore for Allan Grice and wise-cracking Kiwi Graeme Crosby, while the JPS Team BMW also raced and looked likely winners until a late race mishap between Tony Longhurst and Perkins when Longhurst locked his brakes coming off the Thunderdome and hit the back of the Commodore. While Perkins was able to continue with only minor body damage, Longhurst was forced to park the black and gold BMW M3 with a broken ball joint.

The race was broadcast by Channel 7 with commentary from Mike Raymond, Neil Crompton, John Harvey and Brad Jones.

== Classes ==
Cars competed in three classes based on engine capacity.

- Class A: Over 3001cc
- Class B: 2001-3000cc
- Class C: Up to 2000cc

== Results ==
| Pos | Class | No | Entrant | Drivers | Car | Laps | Qual | Qual Time |
|---|---|---|---|---|---|---|---|---|
| 1 | A | 30 | (Australia) Peter Jackson Nissan Racing | (Australia) John Bowe (Australia) Terry Shiel | Nissan Skyline DR30 RS | 70 | 4 | 1:47.59 |
| 2 | A | 11 | (Australia) Everlast Battery Service (Australia) Perkins Engineering | (Australia) Larry Perkins (Australia) Bill O'Brien | Holden VL Commodore SS Group A | 70 | 3 | 1:46.84 |
| 3 | A | 26 | (Australia) Kalari Transport Services | (Australia) Tony Noske (Australia) Garry Rush | Holden VK Commodore SS Group A | 69 | 8 | 1:50.29 |
| 4 | B | 43 | (New Zealand) Graham Lorimer | (New Zealand) Graham Lorimer (New Zealand) John Sax | BMW M3 | 66 | 11 | 1:55.29 |
| 5 | A | 14 | (Australia) Netcomm | (Australia) Murray Carter (Australia) Denis Horley | Nissan Skyline DR30 RS | 66 | 9 | 1:50.40 |
| 6 | A | 42 | (Australia) Jagparts | (Australia) Gerald Kay | Holden VK Commodore SS Group A | 64 | 12 | 1:56.21 |
| 7 | A | 69 | (Australia) Sunliner Campervans | (Australia) Paul Trevathan (New Zealand) Tony Hunter | Mitsubishi Starion Turbo | 63 | 16 | 2:03.10 |
| 8 | A | 20 | (Australia) Salisbury North Service Station | (Australia) John Virgo (Australia) Brian Lee | BMW 635 CSi | 60 | 17 | 2:06.19 |
| 9 | C | 88 | (Australia) David Sala | (Australia) David Sala (Australia) Grant Bailey | Isuzu Gemini ZZ | 60 | 19 | 2:07.27 |
| 10 | C | 86 | (Australia) Gemspares | (Australia) Daryl Hendrick (Australia) John White | Isuzu Gemini ZZ | 57 | 18 | 2:07.24 |
| DNF | B | 3 | (Australia) JPS Team BMW | (New Zealand) Jim Richards (Australia) Tony Longhurst | BMW M3 | 51 | 2 | 1:46.29 |
| DNF | A | 21 | (Australia) Lusty Engineering | (Australia) Graham Lusty (Australia) John Lusty | Holden VL Commodore SS Group A | 43 | 13 | 1:56.45 |
| DNF | A | 25 | (New Zealand) Team Nissan Racing NZ | (New Zealand) Graeme Bowkett (New Zealand) Kent Baigent | Nissan Skyline DR30 RS | 39 | 5 | 1:48.72 |
| DNF | A | 24 | (New Zealand) Team Nissan Racing NZ | (New Zealand) Kent Baigent (Australia) Kevin Bartlett | Nissan Skyline DR30 RS | 28 | 6 | 1:48.78 |
| DNF | A | 2 | (Australia) Roadways Racing | (Australia) Allan Grice (New Zealand) Graeme Crosby | Holden VL Commodore SS Group A | 22 | 1 | 1:45.74 |
| DNF | A | 48 | (Australia) Tony Kavich Racing | (Australia) Tony Kavich (Australia) Ken Davison | Holden VK Commodore SS Group A | 21 | 10 | 1:54.98 |
| DNF | A | 66 | (Australia) The Xerox Shop | (Australia) John Mitchell (Australia) John Internis | Mitsubishi Starion Turbo | 21 | 15 | 1:58.35 |
| DNF | A | 47 | (Australia) Brian Callaghan Racing P/L | (Australia) Brian Callaghan (Australia) Barry Graham | Holden VK Commodore SS Group A | 19 | 7 | 1:49.65 |
| DNF | C | 90 | Toyota Team Australia | (New Zealand) John Faulkner (Australia) Drew Price | Toyota Corolla GT | 10 | 14 | 1:56.92 |

== Statistics ==
- Pole Position - #2 Allan Grice - 1:45.74
- Fastest Lap - #24 Kent Baigent - 1:46.17
- Race Time - 2:09.47.41

== See also ==
1987 Australian Touring Car season
