= 1987 Australian Touring Car season =

Seasons
- ← 1986 1988 →

The 1987 Australian Touring Car season was the 28th year of touring car racing in Australia since the first runnings of the Australian Touring Car Championship and the forerunner of the present-day Bathurst 1000, the Armstrong 500.

There were 16 touring car race meetings held during 1987: a nine-round series, the 1987 Australian Touring Car Championship (ATCC); a support programme event at the 1987 Australian Grand Prix; and six long-distance races, nicknamed 'enduros', two of which were rounds of the one-off 1987 World Touring Car Championship (WTCC).

For the first time, the ATCC had a major series sponsor in the form of oil company Shell, who provided some AU$275,000 in prize money (previously teams and drivers had received as little as $1,250 for an ATCC round win).

== Results and standings ==
=== Race calendar ===
The 1987 Australian touring car season consisted of 16 events.

Date	Series	Circuit	City / state	Winner	Team	Car	Report
15 Feb	Castrol Clash for Cash	Oran Park Raceway	Sydney, New South Wales	Steve Reed	Lansvale Smash Repairs	Holden VK Commodore SS Group A	
1 Mar	ATCC Round 1	Calder Park Raceway	Melbourne, Victoria	Glenn Seton	Peter Jackson Nissan Racing	Nissan Skyline DR30 RS	
8 Mar	ATCC Round 2	Symmons Plains Raceway	Launceston, Tasmania	George Fury	Peter Jackson Nissan Racing	Nissan Skyline DR30 RS	
13 Mar	ATCC Round 3	Lakeside International Raceway	Brisbane, Queensland	Jim Richards	JPS Team BMW	BMW M3	
22 Mar	A2TCC Round 1	Winton Motor Raceway	Benalla, Victoria	John Smith	Toyota Team Australia	Toyota Corolla	
26 Apr	ATCC Round 4	Barbagallo Raceway	Perth, Western Australia	Glenn Seton	Peter Jackson Nissan Racing	Nissan Skyline DR30 RS	
3 May	ATCC Round 5	Adelaide International Raceway	Adelaide, South Australia	Dick Johnson	Shell Ultra Hi-Tech Racing Team	Ford Sierra RS Cosworth	
31 May	ATCC Round 6	Surfers Paradise International Raceway	Surfers Paradise, Queensland	Jim Richards	JPS Team BMW	BMW M3	
7 Jun	ATCC Round 7	Sandown Raceway	Melbourne, Victoria	Glenn Seton	Peter Jackson Nissan Racing	Nissan Skyline DR30 RS	
7 Jun	A2TCC Round 2	Sandown Raceway	Melbourne, Victoria	Mark Skaife	Peter Jackson Nissan Racing	Nissan Gazelle	
21 Jun	ATCC Round 8	Amaroo Park	Sydney, New South Wales	Jim Richards	JPS Team BMW	BMW M3	
5 Jul	ATCC Round 9	Oran Park Raceway	Sydney, New South Wales	Jim Richards	JPS Team BMW	BMW M3	
19 Jul	A2TCC Round 3	Lakeside International Raceway	Brisbane, Queensland	Mark Skaife	Peter Jackson Nissan Racing	Nissan Gazelle	
2 Aug	Hardie Irrigation 100	Amaroo Park	Sydney, New South Wales	Jim Richards	JPS Team BMW	BMW M3	
2 Aug	A2TCC Round 4	Amaroo Park	Sydney, New South Wales	Mark Skaife	Peter Jackson Nissan Racing	Nissan Gazelle	
9 Aug	Yokohama/Bob Jane T-Marts 300	Calder Park Raceway	Melbourne, Victoria	John Bowe; Terry Shiel	Peter Jackson Nissan Racing	Nissan Skyline DR30 RS	report
6 Sep	Pepsi 250	Oran Park Raceway	Sydney, New South Wales	Jim Richards; Tony Longhurst	JPS Team BMW	BMW M3	
13 Sep	Castrol 500	Sandown Raceway	Melbourne, Victoria	George Fury; Terry Shiel	Peter Jackson Nissan Racing	Nissan Skyline DR30 RS	report
4 Oct	James Hardie 1000	Mount Panorama Circuit	Bathurst, New South Wales	Peter McLeod; Peter Brock; David Parsons	HDT Racing P/L	Holden VL Commodore SS Group A	report
4 Oct	WTCC Round 8	Mount Panorama Circuit	Bathurst, New South Wales	Johnny Cecotto; Gianfranco Brancatelli	CiBiEmme	BMW M3	report
11 Oct	Bob Jane T-Marts 500	Calder Park Raceway	Melbourne, Victoria	Steve Soper; Pierre Dieudonné	Ford Texaco Racing Team	Ford Sierra RS500	report
11 Oct	WTCC Round 9	Calder Park Raceway	Melbourne, Victoria	Steve Soper; Pierre Dieudonné	Ford Texaco Racing Team	Ford Sierra RS500	report
14 Nov	South Pacific Touring Car Championship Round 1	Adelaide Street Circuit	Adelaide, South Australia	Dick Johnson	Shell Ultra Hi-Tech Racing Team	Ford Sierra RS500	

=== Hardie Irrigation 100 ===
Pos.	Driver	No.	Team	Car
1	(New Zealand) Jim Richards	3	JPS Team BMW	BMW M3
2	(Australia) Brad Jones (Australia) John French	16	Ralliart Australia	Mitsubishi Starion Turbo
3	(New Zealand) Trevor Crowe (Australia) Jim Keogh	53	Archibald Motorsport	BMW M3

=== Pepsi 250 ===
Pos.	Driver	No.	Team	Car
1	(New Zealand) Jim Richards (Australia) Tony Longhurst	1	JPS Team BMW	BMW M3
2	(Australia) Peter Brock (Australia) David Parsons	05	HDT Racing P/L	Holden VL Commodore SS Group A
3	(West Germany) Ludwig Finauer (New Zealand) Robbie Francevic	3	JPS Team BMW	BMW M3

=== South Pacific Touring Car Championship ===
This race was a support event of the 1987 Australian Grand Prix. Top 10 results shown.

Pos.	Driver	No.	Team	Car	Grid
1	(Australia) Dick Johnson	17	Shell Ultra Hi-Tech Racing Team	Ford Sierra RS500	5
2	(Australia) George Fury	30	Peter Jackson Nissan Racing	Nissan Skyline DR30 RS	7
3	(Australia) Larry Perkins	11	Enzed Team Perkins	Holden VL Commodore SS Group A	1
4	(Australia) Allan Grice	2	Roadways Racing	Holden VL Commodore SS Group A	6
5	(Australia) Colin Bond	57	Caltex CXT Race Team	Alfa Romeo 75 Turbo Evoluzione	4
6	(Australia) Tony Kavich	36	Tony Kavich Racing	Holden VK Commodore SS Group A	13
7	(Australia) David Parsons	6	HDT Racing P/L	Holden VL Commodore SS Group A	11
8	(Australia) Tony Noske	26	Kalari Transport Services	Holden VK Commodore SS Group A	16
9	(Australia) Ray Ellis	36	Grellis Marketing	Holden VL Commodore SS Group A	14
10	(Australia) Phil Ward	19	Reithmuller-Ward International Motorsport	Mercedes-Benz 190E	20
