= 1994 ATCC Winton round =

(Victoria (state)) 1994 Winton ATCC round
Event Information
- Round 6 of 10 in the 1994 Australian Touring Car Championship
- Date: 13-15 May 1994
- Location: Benalla, Victoria
- Venue: Winton Motor Raceway
- Weather: Fine

Results
Race 1
Distance	25 laps	50 km
Pole position	Glenn Seton; Glenn Seton Racing	0:59.540
Winner	Glenn Seton; Glenn Seton Racing	
Race 2
Distance	25 laps	50 km
Winner	Glenn Seton; Glenn Seton Racing	
Round Results
First	Glenn Seton; Glenn Seton Racing	40 pts
Second	Alan Jones; Glenn Seton Racing	33 pts
Third	Mark Skaife; Gibson Motorsport	30 pts

The 1994 Winton ATCC round was the sixth round of the 1994 Australian Touring Car Championship. It was held on the weekend of 13 to 15 May at Winton Motor Raceway in Benalla, Victoria.

== Race results ==
=== Qualifying ===
Glenn Seton took pole position, crushing the field by nearly half a second.

Pos.	No.	Name	Team	Car	Grid
1	1	(Australia) Glenn Seton	Glenn Seton Racing	Ford Falcon (EB)	0:59.540
2	30	(Australia) Alan Jones	Glenn Seton Racing	Ford Falcon (EB)	0:59.900
3	4	(Australia) Wayne Gardner	Wayne Gardner Racing	Holden Commodore (VP)	0:59.920
4	2	(Australia) Mark Skaife	Gibson Motorsport	Holden Commodore (VP)	0:59.930
5	11	(Australia) Larry Perkins	Perkins Engineering	Holden Commodore (VP)	0:59.930
6	17	(Australia) Dick Johnson	Dick Johnson Racing	Ford Falcon (EB)	1:00.030
7	7	(Australia) Neil Crompton	Wayne Gardner Racing	Holden Commodore (VP)	1:00.050
8	05	(Australia) Peter Brock	Holden Racing Team	Holden Commodore (VP)	1:00.090
9	18	(Australia) John Bowe	Dick Johnson Racing	Ford Falcon (EB)	1:00.100
10	25	(Australia) Tony Longhurst	LoGaMo Racing	Holden Commodore (VP)	1:00.260
11	015	(Australia) Tomas Mezera	Holden Racing Team	Holden Commodore (VP)	1:00.590
12	6	(New Zealand) Jim Richards	Gibson Motorsport	Holden Commodore (VP)	1:01.120
13	23	(Australia) Paul Morris	LoGaMo Racing	Holden Commodore (VP)	1:01.280
14	33	(Australia) Bob Pearson	Pro-Duct Motorsport	Holden Commodore (VP)	1:01.430
15	3	(Australia) Trevor Ashby	Lansvale Racing Team	Holden Commodore (VP)	1:01.520
16	12	(Australia) Bob Jones	Ampol Max 3 Racing	Holden Commodore (VP)	1:01.930
17	14	(Australia) Stuart McColl	Stuart McColl Racing	Holden Commodore (VP)	1:02.590
18	26	(Australia) Don Watson	Don Watson Racing	Holden Commodore (VP)	1:02.990
19	41	(Australia) Garry Willmington	Garry Willmington Performance	Ford Falcon (EB)	1:03.160
20	20	(Australia) Ian Palmer	Palmer Promotions	Holden Commodore (VP)	1:03.270
21	47	(Australia) John Trimble	Daily Planet Racing	Holden Commodore (VP)	1:03.480

=== Race 1 ===
In what was a dominant performance, Glenn Seton took a flag-to-flag victory with team-mate Alan Jones in second position. Wayne Gardner was sent down the pack after being spun out by Larry Perkins, losing his front spoiler in the process.

Pos.	No.	Name	Team	Car	Laps	Time/Retired	Grid
1	1	(Australia) Glenn Seton	Glenn Seton Racing	Ford Falcon (EB)	24	24:42.9022	1
2	30	(Australia) Alan Jones	Glenn Seton Racing	Ford Falcon (EB)	24	+ 0.751	2
3	2	(Australia) Mark Skaife	Gibson Motorsport	Holden Commodore (VP)	24	+ 1.277	4
4	7	(Australia) Neil Crompton	Wayne Gardner Racing	Holden Commodore (VP)	24	+ 7.225	7
5	18	(Australia) John Bowe	Dick Johnson Racing	Ford Falcon (EB)	24	+ 8.418	9
6	11	(Australia) Larry Perkins	Perkins Engineering	Holden Commodore (VP)	24	+ 8.923	5
7	05	(Australia) Peter Brock	Holden Racing Team	Holden Commodore (VP)	24	+ 9.198	8
8	6	(New Zealand) Jim Richards	Gibson Motorsport	Holden Commodore (VP)	24	+ 9.640	12
9	25	(Australia) Tony Longhurst	LoGaMo Racing	Holden Commodore (VP)	24	+ 11.593	10
10	23	(Australia) Paul Morris	LoGaMo Racing	Holden Commodore (VP)	24	+ 19.003	13
11	015	(Australia) Tomas Mezera	Holden Racing Team	Holden Commodore (VP)	24	+ 19.533	11
12	17	(Australia) Dick Johnson	Dick Johnson Racing	Ford Falcon (EB)	24	+ 25.773	6
13	26	(Australia) Don Watson	Don Watson Racing	Holden Commodore (VP)	24	+ 58.097	18
14	3	(Australia) Trevor Ashby	Lansvale Racing Team	Holden Commodore (VP)	24	+ 59.819	15
15	33	(Australia) Bob Pearson	Pro-Duct Motorsport	Holden Commodore (VP)	24	+ 1:00.772	14
16	14	(Australia) Stuart McColl	Stuart McColl Racing	Holden Commodore (VP)	24	+ 1:01.426	17
17	12	(Australia) Bob Jones	Ampol Max 3 Racing	Holden Commodore (VP)	23	+ 1 lap	16
18	47	(Australia) John Trimble	Daily Planet Racing	Holden Commodore (VP)	23	+ 1 lap	21
19	20	(Australia) Ian Palmer	Palmer Promotions	Holden Commodore (VP)	22	+ 2 laps	20
20	4	(Australia) Wayne Gardner	Wayne Gardner Racing	Holden Commodore (VP)	21	+ 3 laps	3
DNS	41	(Australia) Garry Willmington	Garry Willmington Performance	Ford Falcon (EB)		Did not start	

=== Race 2 ===
For race two, Jones got off to a flyer and shot off to an early lead. However, a few laps later, he would spin out, handing the lead to team-mate, Glenn Seton. Jones would charge back through the field to achieve third, whilst Seton would take the win. Mark Skaife rounded out a clean race with a valiant second placing.

Pos.	No.	Name	Team	Car	Laps	Time/Retired	Grid
1	1	(Australia) Glenn Seton	Glenn Seton Racing	Ford Falcon (EB)	24	24:44.2742	1
2	2	(Australia) Mark Skaife	Gibson Motorsport	Holden Commodore (VP)	24	+ 1.608	3
3	30	(Australia) Alan Jones	Glenn Seton Racing	Ford Falcon (EB)	24	+ 15.673	2
4	7	(Australia) Neil Crompton	Wayne Gardner Racing	Holden Commodore (VP)	24	+ 17.554	4
5	11	(Australia) Larry Perkins	Perkins Engineering	Holden Commodore (VP)	24	+ 19.757	6
6	18	(Australia) John Bowe	Dick Johnson Racing	Ford Falcon (EB)	24	+ 21.703	5
7	25	(Australia) Tony Longhurst	LoGaMo Racing	Holden Commodore (VP)	24	+ 22.757	9
8	015	(Australia) Tomas Mezera	Holden Racing Team	Holden Commodore (VP)	24	+ 23.025	11
9	6	(New Zealand) Jim Richards	Gibson Motorsport	Holden Commodore (VP)	24	+ 23.231	8
10	23	(Australia) Paul Morris	LoGaMo Racing	Holden Commodore (VP)	24	+ 23.390	10
11	05	(Australia) Peter Brock	Holden Racing Team	Holden Commodore (VP)	24	+ 25.324	7
12	4	(Australia) Wayne Gardner	Wayne Gardner Racing	Holden Commodore (VP)	24	+ 26.967	20
13	17	(Australia) Dick Johnson	Dick Johnson Racing	Ford Falcon (EB)	24	+ 28.171	12
14	12	(Australia) Bob Jones	Ampol Max 3 Racing	Holden Commodore (VP)	24	+ 51.291	17
15	3	(Australia) Trevor Ashby	Lansvale Racing Team	Holden Commodore (VP)	24	+ 51.918	14
16	26	(Australia) Don Watson	Don Watson Racing	Holden Commodore (VP)	24	+ 1:02.638	13
17	14	(Australia) Stuart McColl	Stuart McColl Racing	Holden Commodore (VP)	23	+ 1 lap	16
18	47	(Australia) John Trimble	Daily Planet Racing	Holden Commodore (VP)	23	+ 1 lap	18
Ret	20	(Australia) Ian Palmer	Palmer Promotions	Holden Commodore (VP)	21	Retired	19
Ret	33	(Australia) Bob Pearson	Pro-Duct Motorsport	Holden Commodore (VP)	20	Retired	15
DNS	41	(Australia) Garry Willmington	Garry Willmington Performance	Ford Falcon (EB)		Did not start	

== Championship Standings ==
Drivers' Championship standings

Pos.	No.	Driver	Team	Points
1	2	(Australia) Mark Skaife	Gibson Motorsport	214
2	1	(Australia) Glenn Seton	Glenn Seton Racing	159
3	05	(Australia) Peter Brock	Holden Racing Team	125
4	11	(Australia) Larry Perkins	Perkins Engineering	95
5	6	(New Zealand) Jim Richards	Gibson Motorsport	94
