= John Faulkner (racing driver) =

New Zealand racing driver (born 1952)

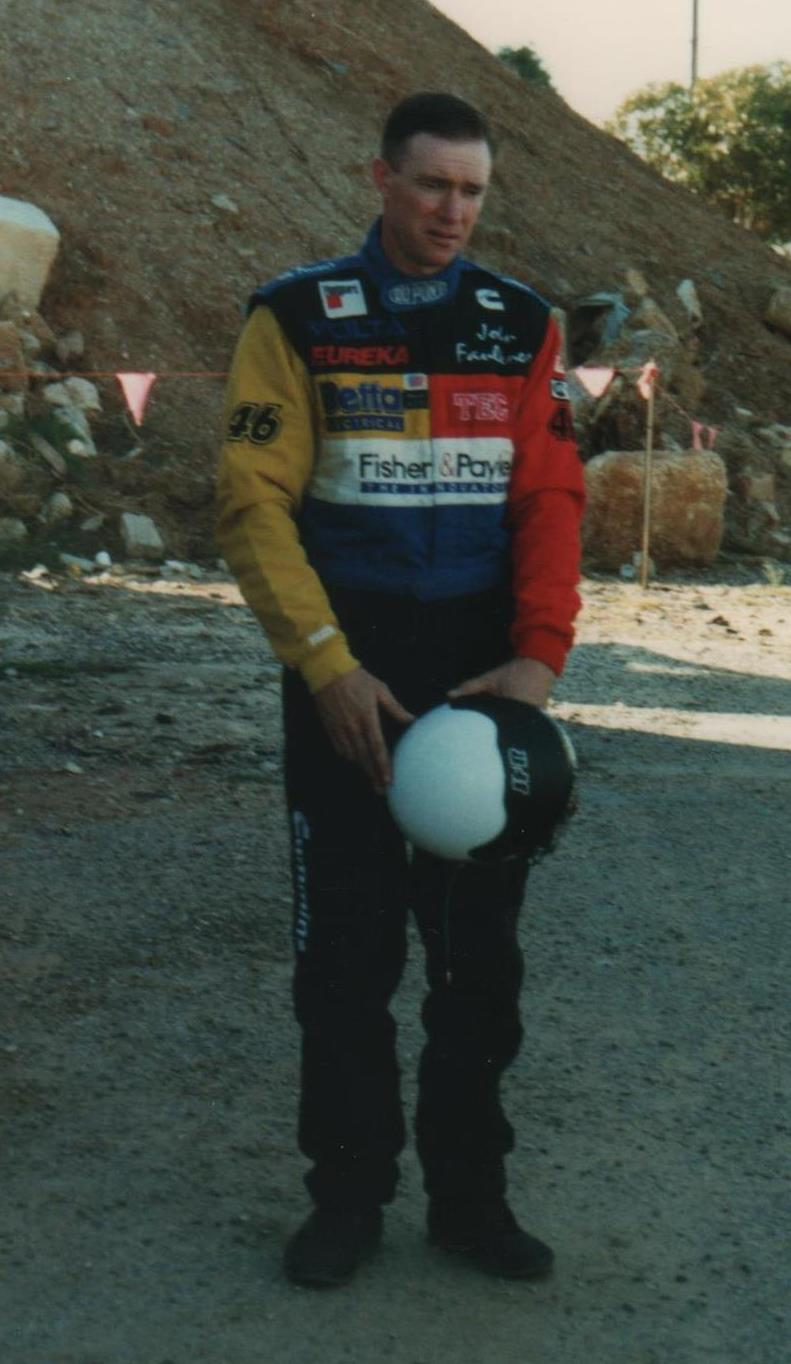
- John Faulkner at Adelaide International Raceway circa 1995
- Nationality: New Zealander
- Born: 24 August 1952 (age 74) Palmerston North, New Zealand
- Relatives: Alyson (wife), Pieter (son) and Kaitlyn (daughter)

ATCC / V8 Supercar
- Years active: 1977–80, 1987 & 1996–2005
- Teams: John Faulkner Racing; Toyota Team Australia; Paul Morris Motorsport; Team Kiwi Racing
- Starts: 112
- Best finish: 10th in 1997 Australian Touring Car Championship

Previous series
- 1992-96 1995-96: AUSCAR; NASCAR Australia

John Murray Faulkner (born 24 August 1952 in Palmerston North, New Zealand) is a retired racing driver. Faulkner spent the majority of his career in sedan based classes. Initially he competing in small touring cars including Ford Escorts and Capris before joining Toyota Team Australia and driving their factory supported Toyota Corolla touring cars. After engine capacity classes were discontinued in the Australian Touring Car Championship, Faulkner moved into Superspeedway racing, establishing John Faulkner Racing to compete in the AUSCAR and Australian NASCAR series, contested mainly at the Calder Park Thunderdome. As NASCAR declined in Australia, Faulkner returned to the Australian Touring Car Championship partway through 1996, and was a surprise starter in the 1996 Bathurst 1000, competing with an ex-Holden Racing Team Holden Commodore, before later constructing his own Holdens. Faulkner's team gradually wound down and left the main series after the 2002 V8 Supercar season. The team continued running Commodores in the second tier Fujitsu V8 Supercar Series until the end of the 2004 season, including briefly running the Holden Young Lions identity.

Faulkner has competed in the Bathurst 1000 on 18 occasions between 1980 and 2005 with a best finish of fifth in 1997.

== Career results ==
=== Career summary ===
Season	Series	Position	Car	Team
1977	Australian Touring Car Championship	37th	Ford Capri	
1978	Australian Touring Car Championship	30th	Ford Capri	
1979	Australian Touring Car Championship	12th	Ford Capri	
1980	Australian Touring Car Championship	20th	Ford Escort Mk.II RS2000	
1987	Australian Touring Car Championship	20th	Toyota Corolla	Toyota Team Australia
1987	Australian 2.0 Litre Touring Car Championship	3rd	Toyota Corolla	Toyota Team Australia
1993	Australian AUSCAR Championship	3rd	Holden VP Commodore	John Faulkner Racing
1995	Australian AUSCAR Championship	3rd	Holden VP Commodore	John Faulkner Racing
1996	Australian NASCAR Championship	3rd	Chevrolet Monte Carlo	John Faulkner Racing
1996	Australian Touring Car Championship	17th	Holden VR Commodore	John Faulkner Racing
1997	Australian Touring Car Championship	10th	Holden VS Commodore	John Faulkner Racing
1998	Australian Touring Car Championship	13th	Holden VS Commodore	John Faulkner Racing
1999	Shell Championship Series	15th	Holden VT Commodore	John Faulkner Racing
2000	Shell Championship Series	18th	Holden VT Commodore	John Faulkner Racing
2001	Shell Championship Series	30th	Holden VX Commodore	John Faulkner Racing
2002	V8 Supercar Championship Series	29th	Holden VX Commodore	John Faulkner Racing
2003	V8 Supercar Championship Series	49th	Holden VY Commodore	Paul Morris Motorsport
2005	V8 Supercar Championship Series	45th	Holden VZ Commodore	Team Kiwi Racing
2013	Australian Production Car Championship	27th	FPV FG GT	Lovton Coal

=== Complete V8 Supercar results ===
V8 Supercars results
Year	Team	Car	1	2	3	4	5	6	7	8	9	10	11	12	13	14	15	16	17	18	19	20	21	22	23	24	25	26	27	28	29	30	31	32	33	Position	Points
1977	Wynn's Friction Proofing	Ford Capri V6	SYM; R1	CAL; R2	ORA; R3	AMA; R4	SAN; R5	ADE; R6	LAK; R7	SAN; R8	ADE; R9	SUR; R10	PHI; R11; 14																							37th	2
1978	Wynn's Friction Proofing	Ford Capri V6	SYM; R1	ORA; R2; 14	AMA; R3	SAN; R4	WAN; R5	CAL; R6	LAK; R7	ADE; R8																										30th	2
1979	John Faulkner Racing	Ford Capri V6	SYM; R1	CAL; R2; 12	ORA; R3	SAN; R4; 16	WAN; R5	SUR; R6	LAK; R7	ADE; R8																										12th	10
1980	John Faulkner Racing	Ford Escort Mk.II RS2000	SYM; R1; 10	CAL; R2	LAK; R3	SAN; R4	WAN; R5	SUR; R6	ADE; R7; 12	ORA; R8																										23rd	4
1987	Toyota Team Australia	Toyota Corolla FX-GT AE82	CAL; R1	SYM; R2	LAK; R3	WAN; R4	ADE; R5	SUR; R6	SAN; R7; 17	AMA; R8	ORA; R9																									24th	3
1996	John Faulkner Racing	Holden Commodore (VR)	EAS; R1	EAS; R2	EAS; R3	SAN; R4	SAN; R5	SAN; R6	BAT; R7	BAT; R8	BAT; R9	SYM; R10	SYM; R11	SYM; R12	PHI; R13; 13	PHI; R14; DNS	PHI; R15; 9	CAL; R16; 10	CAL; R17; 9	CAL; R18; 11	LAK; R19; 16	LAK; R20; Ret	LAK; R21; Ret	WAN; R22	WAN; R23	WAN; R24	MAL; R25	MAL; R26	MAL; R27	ORA; R28; Ret	ORA; R29; 16	ORA; R30; Ret				17th	5
1997	John Faulkner Racing	Holden Commodore (VS)	CAL; R1; 14	CAL; R2; 10	CAL; R3; 14	PHI; R4; 9	PHI; R5; 8	PHI; R6; 7	SAN; R7; 12	SAN; R8; 7	SAN; R9; 6	SYM; R10; 5	SYM; R11; 4	SYM; R12; Ret	WIN; R13; 9	WIN; R14; 14	WIN; R15; 8	EAS; R16; 10	EAS; R17; 10	EAS; R18; 8	LAK; R19; 10	LAK; R20; 7	LAK; R21; 7	WAN; R22; Ret	WAN; R23; 17	WAN; R24; 5	MAL; R25; Ret	MAL; R26; 10	MAL; R27; 11	ORA; R28; 8	ORA; R29; 9	ORA; R30; 5				10th	324
1998	John Faulkner Racing	Holden Commodore (VS)	SAN; R1; 11	SAN; R2; Ret	SAN; R3; DNS	SYM; R4; 22	SYM; R5; Ret	SYM; R6; 10	LAK; R7; 8	LAK; R8; Ret	LAK; R9; Ret	PHI; R10; 10	PHI; R11; 10	PHI; R12; 10	WIN; R13; 12	WIN; R14; 10	WIN; R15; Ret	MAL; R16; 8	MAL; R17; 6	MAL; R18; 7	WAN; R19; 11	WAN; R20; 10	WAN; R21; 5	CAL; R22; Ret	CAL; R23; Ret	CAL; R24; C	HID; R25; 6	HID; R26; Ret	HID; R27; DNS	ORA; R28; 11	ORA; R29; 15	ORA; R30; 12				13th	276
1999	John Faulkner Racing	Holden Commodore (VT)	EAS; R1; 34	EAS; R2; 12	EAS; R3; 11	ADE; R4; Ret	WAN; R5; 6	WAN; R6; 13	WAN; R7; Ret	PHI; R8; 5	PHI; R9; 4	PHI; R10; Ret	HID; R11; Ret	HID; R12; 23	HID; R13; 9	SAN; R14; 11	SAN; R15; 8	SAN; R16; Ret	QUE; R17; 12	QUE; R18; 10	QUE; R19; 16	CAL; R20; 13	CAL; R21; 8	CAL; R22; 8	SYM; R23; 19	SYM; R24; 12	SYM; R25; Ret	WIN; R26; 10	WIN; R27; 8	WIN; R28; 7	ORA; R29; 13	ORA; R30; Ret	ORA; R31; DNS	QUE; R32; 9	BAT; R33; Ret	15th	824
2000	John Faulkner Racing	Holden Commodore (VT)	PHI; R1; 10	PHI; R2; 14	WAN; R3; Ret	WAN; R4; 17	WAN; R5; 14	ADE; R6; 10	ADE; R7; 14	EAS; R8; 13	EAS; R9; 21	EAS; R10; 17	HID; R11; 10	HID; R12; 6	HID; R13; 5	CAN; R14; 11	CAN; R15; Ret	CAN; R16; DNS	QUE; R17; Ret	QUE; R18; Ret	QUE; R19; Ret	WIN; R20; 28	WIN; R21; 28	WIN; R22; Ret	ORA; R23; 11	ORA; R24; 11	ORA; R25; 7	CAL; R26; 14	CAL; R27; Ret	CAL; R28; DNS	QUE; R29; 12	SAN; R30; 18	SAN; R31; 12	SAN; R32; Ret	BAT; R33; Ret	18th	460
2001	John Faulkner Racing	Holden Commodore (VT)	PHI; R1; 30	PHI; R2; 19	ADE; R3; 12	ADE; R4; 12	EAS; R5; 28	EAS; R6; 24	HID; R7; 26	HID; R8; Ret	HID; R9; Ret	CAN; R10; DNS	CAN; R11; DNS	CAN; R12; 20	WAN; R13; 27	WAN; R14; 25	WAN; R15; 23	CAL; R16; DNS	CAL; R17; DNS	CAL; R18; DNS	ORA; R19; 21	ORA; R20; Ret	QUE; R21; Ret	WIN; R22; 16	WIN; R23; Ret	BAT; R24; Ret	PUK; R25; Ret	PUK; R26; 19	PUK; R27; 17	SAN; R28; Ret	SAN; R29; 13	SAN; R30; 10				30th	810
2002	John Faulkner Racing	Holden Commodore (VX)	ADE; R1; Ret	ADE; R2; Ret	PHI; R3; Ret	PHI; R4; Ret	EAS; R5; 3	EAS; R6; 6	EAS; R7; Ret	HID; R8; 25	HID; R9; Ret	HID; R10; DNS	CAN; R11; 22	CAN; R12; 4	CAN; R13; 15	WAN; R14; 28	WAN; R15; 12	WAN; R16; 24	ORA; R17; 16	ORA; R18; 19	WIN; R19; 19	WIN; R20; Ret	QUE; R21; Ret	BAT; R22; 10	SUR; R23; 18	SUR; R24; Ret	PUK; R25; 20	PUK; R26; Ret	PUK; R27; Ret	SAN; R28; 19	SAN; R29; Ret					29th	365
2003	Paul Morris Motorsport	Holden Commodore (VY)	ADE; R1	ADE; R1	PHI; R3	EAS; R4	WIN; R5	BAR; R6	BAR; R7	BAR; R8	HDV; R9	HDV; R10	HDV; R11	QLD; R12	ORA; R13	SAN; R14; 13	BAT; R15; Ret	SUR; R16	SUR; R17	PUK; R18	PUK; R19	PUK; R20	EAS; R21	EAS; R22												49th	144
2005	Team Kiwi Racing	Holden Commodore (VZ)	ADE; R1	ADE; R2	PUK; R3	PUK; R4	PUK; R5	BAR; R6	BAR; R7	BAR; R8	EAS; R9	EAS; R10	SHA; R11	SHA; R12	SHA; R13	HDV; R14	HDV; R15	HDV; R16	QLD; R17	ORA; R18	ORA; R19	SAN; R20; Ret	BAT; R21; 10	SUR; R22	SUR; R23	SUR; R24	SYM; R25	SYM; R26	SYM; R27	PHI; R28	PHI; R29	PHI; R30				45th	156

=== Complete Bathurst 500/1000 results ===
Year	Team	Co-drivers	Car	Class	Laps	Pos.	Class pos.
1980	Allbrells Auto Care Centres	(Australia) Gary Dumbrell	Ford Escort RS2000 Mk.II	1601-2000cc	129	26th	6th
1981	Cherry City Ford	(Australia) Gary Dumbrell	Ford Escort Mk.II 2.0 GL	4 Cylinder	72	DNF	DNF
1984	Bayswater Auto Wreckers Pty. Ltd.	(Australia) Colin Campbell	Holden VH Commodore	Group C	130	25th	20th
1985	Toyota Team Australia	(Australia) Ray Cutchie	Toyota Sprinter AE86	A	110	DNF	DNF
1986	Toyota Team Australia	(Australia) Mike Quinn	Toyota Corolla GT	A	148	19th	1st
1987	Toyota Team Australia	(Australia) Mike Quinn (Australia) John Smith	Toyota Corolla GT	3	118	DNF	DNF
1988	Toyota Team Australia	(Australia) Drew Price	Toyota Corolla GT	C	146	9th	1st
1989	Toyota Team Australia	(Australia) Peter McKay	Toyota Corolla FX-GT	A	140	19th	2nd
1990	Toyota Team Australia	(Australia) Paul Stokell (Australia) Mike Dowson	Toyota Corolla FX-GT	3	130	27th	3rd
1996	John Faulkner Racing	(Australia) Steve Harrington	Holden VR Commodore		119	DNF	DNF
1997	John Faulkner Racing	(United Kingdom) Win Percy	Holden VS Commodore	L1	154	5th	5th
1998	John Faulkner Racing	(Australia) Todd Kelly	Holden VS Commodore	OC	136	DNF	DNF
1999	John Faulkner Racing	(New Zealand) Simon Wills	Holden VT Commodore		65	DNF	DNF
2000	John Faulkner Racing	(Australia) Adam Macrow	Holden VT Commodore		154	DNF	DNF
2001	John Faulkner Racing	(Australia) Peter Doulman	Holden VX Commodore		33	DNF	DNF
2002	John Faulkner Racing	(Australia) Rick Bates	Holden VX Commodore		160	10th	10th
2003	Team Sirromet Wines	(Australia) Paul Morris	Holden VY Commodore		5	DNF	DNF
2005	Team Kiwi Racing	(Australia) Alan Gurr	Holden VZ Commodore		158	10th	10th
