= 1987 Australian Manufacturers' Championship =

The 1987 Australian Manufacturers' Championship was a CAMS sanctioned motor racing title for car manufacturers. The title, which was the seventeenth Australian Manufacturers' Championship, was contested concurrently with the 1987 Australian Touring Car Championship over a nine-round series.

- Round 1, Calder Park, Victoria, 1 March
- Round 2, Symmons Plains, Tasmania, 8 March
- Round 3, Lakeside, Queensland, 5 April
- Round 4, Wanneroo Park, Western Australia, 26 April
- Round 5, Adelaide International Raceway, South Australia, 3 May
- Round 6, Surfers Paradise, Queensland, 31 May
- Round 7, Sandown Park, Victoria, 7 June
- Round 8, Amaroo Park, New South Wales, 21 June
- Round 9, Oran Park, New South Wales, 5 July

Each round was open to cars complying with CAMS Touring Car regulations which were based on international Group A Touring Car rules. Cars competed in two engine capacity classes:

- Up to 2500cc
- Over 2500cc

Championship points were awarded on a 20–15–12–10–8–6–4–3–2–1 basis for the top ten placings in each class at each round. However, points were only allocated for the best placed car from each manufacturer at each round and only the best eight round results could be retained by each manufacturer.

== Results ==
Position	Manufacturer	Car	Rd 1	Rd 2	Rd 3	Rd 4	Rd 5	Rd 6	Rd 7	Rd 8	Rd 9	Total
1	Nissan	Skyline DR30 RS	20	20	20	20	(15)	20	20	20	20	160
	BMW	M3	20	20	20	20	20	20	(6)	20	20	160
3	Holden	VK Commodore SS Group A VL Commodore SS Group A	15	15	15	12	12	12	12	12	(12)	105
4	Alfa Romeo	75 Turbo	12	12	12	12	15	-	4	-	10	77
5	Ford	Sierra RS Cosworth	8	10	0	15	20	-	-	8	15	76
6	Toyota	Celica RA40; Corolla; Corolla GT	6	-	10	-	10	-	15	10	8	59
7	Isuzu	Gemini	10	-	-	-	8	-	-	-	6	24
8	Rover	SD1 Vitesse	-	-	2	3	-	-	-	-	-	5
