= 1987 Australian Touring Car Championship =

Motor racing competition

Seasons
- ← 1986 1988 →

The 1987 Australian Touring Car Championship was a motor racing competition which was open to Touring Cars complying with regulations as defined by the Confederation of Australian Motor Sport and based on FIA Group A rules. The championship, which was the 28th Australian Touring Car Championship, began on 1 March 1987 at Calder Park Raceway and ended on 5 July at Oran Park Raceway after nine rounds. The Calder round saw the world debut of the racing versions of the BMW M3, the Ford Sierra RS Cosworth and the Alfa Romeo 75 Turbo.

The championship was won by Jim Richards driving a BMW M3 for JPS Team BMW.

After years of racing for very little in prize money which brought numerous complaints from the leading competitors (in 1984, Dick Johnson Racing (DJR) had travelled an estimated 20,000 km to races around the country from their Brisbane base, often for as little as A$1,200 in prize money, far less money that was on offer at the time for the lower ranked Group E Series Production "Super Series" which offered a total prize pool of $200,000 thanks to series sponsor Bob Jane T-Marts), CAMS signed a AU$275,000 sponsorship package with Shell which brought the championship an overall sponsor for the first time and saw the series promoted as the Shell Ultra Australian Touring Car Championship.

Shell would also become the major sponsor of DJR which saw the team expand to running two cars for the first time. The team ran a pair of the new Ford Sierra RS Cosworths for team boss Dick Johnson and his 1986 James Hardie 1000 co-driver Gregg Hansford. Dick Johnson's win in Round 5 at the Adelaide International Raceway was erroneously touted as the world's first race victory for the Sierra RS Cosworth, though in reality British Sierra driver/engineer Andy Rouse had won the opening round of the 1987 British Touring Car Championship race at Silverstone 3 weeks earlier. This was also Dick Johnson's first ATCC win since Round 4 of the 1984 ATCC at Surfers Paradise.

The 1987 ATCC was the first time since 1975 that Peter Brock failed to win a round of the championship, his best finish being a 3rd at Symmons Plains in Tasmania in Round 2 where his 4.9L V8 Holden VK Commodore SS Group A was simply out-gunned on a noted power circuit by the Roadways Racing Commodore of Allan Grice (before his race ended), the factory Nissan Skyline turbo of race winner George Fury, while his heavy Commodore was no match on tyres and brakes for the 4 cyl, 2.3L BMW M3 of Jim Richards. Brock did manage to hold second behind runaway early leader Grice for a number of laps, but once Fury was through the Skyline drove away from Brock and he then had no answer to the challenge of Richards.

The 1987 championship was also the first time since 1972 that a Holden car failed to win a round of the ATCC, the best result being a second by Larry Perkins in the opening round at Calder.

The 1987 ATCC was also the first time in championship history that rolling starts were used. Rolling starts were used at Calder for Round 1 and at Adelaide for Round 5.

Jim Richards victory in the final round of the series at Oran Park would be the last time a car powered by a naturally aspirated engine would win an ATCC race until Tony Longhurst won Round 6 of the 1991 Australian Touring Car Championship driving a BMW M3 Evolution. Between 1988 and Round 6 in 1991, turbo powered cars would win 30 straight ATCC races, 21 of them by the Sierra Cosworth's evolution replacement which appeared after the 1987 ATCC, the Ford Sierra RS500.

1987 was a year of lasts in Australian touring car racing. It was the last time Peter Brock would drive a Holden until 1991 as he would switch first to BMW in 1988 and then Fords in 1989 and 1990. Consequently, it was the last time the Holden Dealer Team name, which started under Harry Firth in 1969, would be used, though the team officially ran as "HDT Racing Pty Ltd" as it was no longer the factory backed team following Holden's well publicised split with Brock in February only one week before the opening round at Calder. Prior to Calder, Holden had formed the Holden Motorsport Group and immediately signed Larry Perkins and his team as well as Allan Grice and Roadways Racing to be the 'factory backed' teams in the championship, though Grice would later say that it was more about moral support and an easier supply of parts rather than any financial support. It would also be Colin Bond's last year of racing Alfa Romeo's before switching back to Ford to run a Sierra RS500 from 1988 (largely due to Alfa stopping its development program of the Alfa 75 touring car and because Bond felt that he needed an outright car to do justice to his new major sponsor Caltex). It was also the last time the JPS Team BMW (who won their second title) would be seen with team boss Frank Gardner unexpectedly closing the team down at the end of the year.

== Teams and drivers ==
The following teams and drivers competed in the 1987 Australian Touring Car Championship.

Team	Car	No	Driver	Rounds
Roadways Racing	Holden VK Commodore SS Group A Holden VL Commodore SS Group A	2	(Australia) Allan Grice	1–5, 7–9
Roadways Racing	Holden VK Commodore SS Group A Holden VL Commodore SS Group A	8	(New Zealand) Graeme Crosby	1–2
JPS Team BMW	BMW E30 M3	3	(New Zealand) Jim Richards	All
JPS Team BMW	BMW E30 M3	4	(Australia) Tony Longhurst	All
JPS Team BMW	BMW E30 M3	12	(West Germany) Ludwig Finauer	8–9
HDT Racing Pty Ltd	Holden VK Commodore SS Group A Holden VL Commodore SS Group A	05	(Australia) Peter Brock	1–2, 6–9
HDT Racing Pty Ltd	Holden VK Commodore SS Group A Holden VL Commodore SS Group A	05	(Australia) Gary Scott	3
HDT Racing Pty Ltd	Holden VK Commodore SS Group A Holden VL Commodore SS Group A	6	(Australia) Gary Scott	1–2, 6, 8
HDT Racing Pty Ltd	Holden VK Commodore SS Group A Holden VL Commodore SS Group A	6	(Australia) Peter Brock	3–5
HDT Racing Pty Ltd	Holden VK Commodore SS Group A Holden VL Commodore SS Group A	6	(Australia) David Parsons	7
HDT Racing Pty Ltd	Holden VK Commodore SS Group A Holden VL Commodore SS Group A	6	(New Zealand) Jon Crooke	9
John Andrew Motorsport	Ford Sierra XR4Ti	10	(New Zealand) Neville Crichton	1, 6
John Andrew Motorsport	Ford Sierra XR4Ti	10	(New Zealand) Denny Hulme	3, 5
Enzed Team Perkins	Holden VK Commodore SS Group A	11	(Australia) Larry Perkins	All
Bob Holden Motors	Toyota Sprinter Trueno AE86	13	(Australia) Bob Holden	7
Bob Holden Motors	Toyota Sprinter Trueno AE86	13	(Australia) Garry Willmington	9
Bob Holden Motors	Toyota Sprinter Trueno AE86	41	(Australia) Mike Hall	7
Bob Holden Motors	Toyota Sprinter Trueno AE86	41	(New Zealand) John Sax	9
Netcomm	Nissan Skyline DR30 RS	14	(Australia) Murray Carter	1, 5, 7–9
Peter Jackson Nissan Racing	Nissan Skyline DR30 RS	15	(Australia) Glenn Seton	All
Peter Jackson Nissan Racing	Nissan Skyline DR30 RS	30	(Australia) George Fury	All
Peter Jackson Nissan Racing	Nissan Skyline DR30 RS	60	(Australia) John Bowe	9
Peter Jackson Nissan Racing	Nissan Gazelle	60	(Australia) Mark Skaife	7
Ralliart Australia	Mitsubishi Starion	16	(Australia) Brad Jones	6
Shell Ultra Hi-Tech Racing Team	Ford Sierra RS Cosworth	17	(Australia) Dick Johnson	All
Shell Ultra Hi-Tech Racing Team	Ford Sierra RS Cosworth	18	(Australia) Gregg Hansford	All
Terry Finnigan	Holden VL Commodore SS Group A	20	(Australia) Terry Finnigan	9
Lusty Engineering	Holden VK Commodore SS Group A	21	(Australia) Graham Lusty	1, 5, 7, 9
Alf Grant Racing	Holden VK Commodore SS Group A	23	(Australia) Alf Grant	3, 6, 8–9
Team Nissan Racing NZ	Nissan Skyline DR30 RS	24	(New Zealand) Kent Baigent	6–9
Team Nissan Racing NZ	Nissan Skyline DR30 RS	25	(New Zealand) Graeme Bowkett	6–9
Kalari Transport	Holden VK Commodore SS Group A	26	(Australia) Tony Noske	1, 5–7
Kalari Transport	Holden VK Commodore SS Group A	26	(Australia) Gary Rush	8–9
Ray Gulson	BMW 635CSi	27	(Australia) Graham Gulson	1, 6, 9
Ray Gulson	BMW 635CSi	27	(Australia) Ray Gulson	2–3, 7–8
Capri Components	Ford Mustang GT	28	(Australia) Lawrie Nelson	1, 7
Wayne Clift	Holden VK Commodore SS Group A	28	(Australia) Wayne Clift	3
Simon Emmerling	BMW 635CSi	29	(Australia) Simon Emmerling	4
Ian Love	Ford Mustang GT	31	(Australia) Ian Love	4
Toyota Team Australia	Toyota Corolla GT AE86	31	(Australia) John Smith	1, 7
Toyota Team Australia	Toyota Corolla FX-GT AE82	32	(Australia) Drew Price	1, 3, 5, 7
Toyota Team Australia	Toyota Corolla FX-GT AE82	33	(New Zealand) John Faulkner	5, 7
Oxo Motorsport	Ford Sierra RS Cosworth	34	(Australia) Don Smith	1, 3, 5
Oxo Motorsport	Ford Sierra RS Cosworth	34	(Australia) John Giddings	6–9
Oxo Motorsport	Ford Sierra RS Cosworth	35	(Australia) Andrew Miedecke	1–3, 5–9
Oxo Motorsport	Ford Sierra RS Cosworth	36	(Australia) Don Smith	2
Grellis Marketing	Holden VK Commodore SS Group A	38	(Australia) Ray Ellis	1, 6–7
Lansvale Racing Team	Holden VK Commodore SS Group A	39	(Australia) Trevor Ashby	8–9
Steve Williams	Holden VK Commodore SS Group A	40	(Australia) Steve Williams	9
Jagparts	Holden VK Commodore SS Group A	42	(Australia) Gerald Kay	7
Sutherland Mitsubishi	Mitsubishi Starion	42	(Australia) Kevin Bartlett	9
Lester Smerdon	Holden VK Commodore SS Group A	45	(Australia) Lester Smerdon	3, 6
Mobile Concrete Pumping	Holden VK Commodore SS Group A	47	(Australia) Brian Callaghan	8–9
Wayne Park	Holden VK Commodore SS Group A	48	(Australia) Wayne Park	3, 6
John Donnelly	Rover Vitesse	50	(Australia) John Donnelly	3, 6
John Farrell	Holden VL Commodore SS Group A	52	(Australia) John Farrell	4
Mike Freeman	Toyota Celica RA40	57	(Australia) Mike Freeman	1, 7
David Ratcliff	Toyota Corolla Levin AE86	58	(Australia) David Ratcliff	7–9
Jon Mitchell	Holden VK Commodore SS Group A	69	(Australia) Jon Mitchell	7–8
Graeme Hooley	Holden VK Commodore SS Group A	71	(Australia) Graeme Hooley	4–5, 8
Caltex CXT Racing	Alfa Romeo 75 Turbo	75	(Australia) Colin Bond	All
Liverpool Toyota	Toyota Celica Supra MA61	77	(Australia) Peter Williamson	9
Peter McLeod	Holden VK Commodore SS Group A	84	(Australia) Peter McLeod	9
Daryl Hendrick	Isuzu Gemini ZZ	86	(Australia) Daryl Hendrick	1, 5, 7, 9
Brian Bolwell	BMW E30 323i	87	(Australia) Brian Bolwell	5, 7
David Sala	Isuzu Gemini PF60	88	(Australia) David Sala	1, 7, 9
Alf Barbagallo	Rover Vitesse	96	(New Zealand) Tim Slako	4

Peter Brock drove both the #05 and #6 HDT VK Commodore during the season

== Race calendar ==
The 1987 Australian Touring Car Championship was contested over a nine-round series with one race per round.

Rd.	Race title	Circuit	Location / state	Date	Winner	Car	Team	Report
1	Calder Park	Calder Park Raceway	Melbourne, Victoria	28 Feb - 1 Mar	(Australia) Glenn Seton	Nissan Skyline RS DR30	Nissan Motorsport Australia	
2	Launceston	Symmons Plains Raceway	Launceston, Tasmania	7 - 8 Mar	(Australia) George Fury	Nissan Skyline RS DR30	Nissan Motorsport Australia	
3	Lakeside	Lakeside International Raceway	Brisbane, Queensland	4 - 5 Apr	(New Zealand) Jim Richards	BMW M3	JPS Team BMW	
4	Perth	Wanneroo Raceway	Perth, Western Australia	25 - 26 Apr	(Australia) Glenn Seton	Nissan Skyline RS DR30	Nissan Motorsport Australia	
5	Adelaide	Adelaide International Raceway	Adelaide, South Australia	4–5 May	(Australia) Dick Johnson	Ford Sierra RS Cosworth	Shell Ultra Hi-Tech Racing Team	
6	Surfers Paradise	Surfers Paradise Raceway	Surfers Paradise, Queensland	30–31 May	(New Zealand) Jim Richards	BMW M3	JPS Team BMW	
7	Sandown	Sandown International Raceway	Melbourne, Victoria	6 - 7 Jun	(Australia) Glenn Seton	Nissan Skyline RS DR30	Nissan Motorsport Australia	
8	Amaroo Park	Amaroo Park	Sydney, New South Wales	20 - 21 Jun	(New Zealand) Jim Richards	BMW M3	JPS Team BMW	
9	Grand Final	Oran Park Raceway	Sydney, New South Wales	4 - 5 Jul	(New Zealand) Jim Richards	BMW M3	JPS Team BMW	

== Classes ==
Cars competed in two classes based on engine capacity.

- Over 2500cc
- Under 2500cc

The Over 2500cc class was contested by Ford Mustang, Ford Sierra, Holden Commodore, Nissan Skyline, Rover Vitesse and Toyota Supra.

The Under 2500cc class consisted of Alfa Romeo 75, BMW 323i, BMW M3, Isuzu Gemini, Nissan Gazelle, Toyota Celica and Toyota Corolla.

== Points system ==
Championship points were awarded at each round on a 20–15–12–10–8–6–4–3–2–1 basis for the top ten positions outright and on a 9-6-4-3-2-1 basis for the top six positions in each of the two classes. Only the best eight round results could be retained by each driver.

== Championship results ==
Pos	Driver	Car	Cal	Sym	Lak	Wan	Ade	Sur	San	Ama	Ora	Pts
1	Jim Richards	BMW M3	5th	2nd	1st	4th	5th	1st	Ret	1st	1st	193
2	Glenn Seton	Nissan Skyline DR30	1st	4th	2nd	1st	Ret	3rd	1st	3rd	Ret	167
3	George Fury	Nissan Skyline DR30	3rd	1st	Ret	Ret	2nd	4th	2nd	4th	2nd	143
4	Tony Longhurst	BMW M3	6th	5th	3rd	8th	8th	2nd	Ret	2nd	5th	116
5	Larry Perkins	Holden VK Commodore	2nd	(7th)	4th	3rd	6th	5th	3rd	5th	4th	115 (121)
6	Dick Johnson	Ford Sierra Cosworth	9th	9th	DSQ	2nd	1st	Ret	Ret	Ret	3rd	72
7	Peter Brock	Holden VK Commodore; Holden VL Commodore	Ret	3rd	5th	7th	4th	9th	9th	7th	7th	65
8	Allan Grice	Holden VK Commodore; Holden VL Commodore	4th	Ret	6th	6th	3rd		4th	9th	Ret	62
9	Colin Bond	Alfa Romeo 75	12th	11th	7th	9th	7th	Ret	21st	Ret	10th	36
10	Gregg Hansford	Ford Sierra Cosworth	Ret	6th	DSQ	5th	Ret	Ret	Ret	8th	Ret	25
11	Kent Baigent	Nissan Skyline DR30						7th	5th	Ret	8th	20
12	Murray Carter	Nissan Skyline DR30	8th				Ret		7th	13th	6th	17
13	Ludwig Finauer	BMW M3								6th	9th	16
13	Graeme Bowkett	Nissan Skyline DR30						6th	6th	DNS	11th	16
15	Andrew Miedecke	Ford Sierra Cosworth	7th	8th	Ret		12th	DSQ	DSQ	DSQ	Ret	10
15	Drew Price	Toyota Corolla	Ret		11th		14th		16th			10
17	Mark Skaife	Nissan Gazelle							12th			9
18	John Smith	Toyota Corolla	Ret						13th			6
18	Daryl Hendrick	Isuzu Gemini ZZ	15th				15th		20th		20th	6
20	Lester Smerdon	Holden VK Commodore			8th			11th				5
20	David Ratcliff	Toyota Corolla							18th	15th		5
22	Gary Scott	Holden VK Commodore	Ret	Ret	DNS			8th		11th		4
22	Don Smith	Ford Sierra Cosworth	11th	10th	Ret		9th					4
24	Wayne Clift	Holden VK Commodore			9th			Ret				3
24	David 'Skippy' Parsons	Holden VK Commodore							8th			3
24	John Faulkner	Toyota Corolla							17th			3
27	David Sala	Isuzu Gemini ZZ	16th									2
27	John Sax	Toyota Corolla									19th	2
27	Brian Bolwell	BMW 323i					16th		19th			2
27	Tony Noske	Holden VK Commodore	13th				11th	10th	10th			2
31	Neville Crichton	Ford Sierra XR4Ti	10th					Ret				1
31	Mike Freeman	Toyota Celica	17th						Ret			1
31	Wayne Park	Holden VK Commodore			10th			14th				1
31	Graeme Hooley	Holden VK Commodore				10th	13th			16th		1
31	Peter Williamson	Toyota Supra					10th				15th	1
31	Brian Callaghan	Holden VK Commodore								10th	16th	1
32	John Giddings	Ford Sierra Cosworth						DSQ	DSQ	DSQ	Ret	0
Pos	Driver	Car	Cal	Sym	Lak	Wan	Ade	Sur	San	Ama	Ora	Pts

Colour	Result
Gold	Winner
Silver	Second place
Bronze	Third place
Green	Points classification
Blue	Non-points classification
Blue	Non-classified finish (NC)
Purple	Retired, not classified (Ret)
Red	Did not qualify (DNQ)
Red	Did not pre-qualify (DNPQ)
Black	Disqualified (DSQ)
White	Did not start (DNS)
White	Withdrew (WD)
White	Race cancelled (C)
Blank	Did not practice (DNP)
Blank	Did not arrive (DNA)
Blank	Excluded (EX)

== See also ==
- 1987 Australian Manufacturers' Championship, which was contested concurrently with the 1987 Australian Touring Car Championship
- 1987 Australian 2.0 Litre Touring Car Championship
- 1987 Australian Touring Car season
