= Tony Noske =

Australian racing driver and businessman (born 1951)

- Nationality: Australian
- Born: 14 May 1951 (age 75) Hamilton, Victoria
- Relatives: Mark Noske

Australian Touring Car Championship
- Years active: 1987-1990
- Teams: Kalari Transport; Mobil 1 Racing; Dick Johnson Racing; Glenn Seton Racing
- Starts: 25

Anthony Stuart Noske (born 14 May 1951) is a former Australian motor racing driver and transport company proprietor.

== Motor racing ==
Having competed in sprintcars, Noske entered four rounds of the 1987 Australian Touring Car Championship with a Perkins Engineering built Holden Commodore VK before contesting the Calder 300, Bathurst 1000 and Calder 500 with Garry Rush co-driving. Noske competed in six rounds of the 1988 Australian Touring Car Championship.

In 1989, Noske co-drove Ford Sierra RS500s for Mobil 1 Racing, Dick Johnson Racing and Glenn Seton Racing. Having taken on a managerial role with the Mobil 1 Racing team, Noske entered three rounds of the 1990 Australian Touring Car Championship. Noske's son Mark would later become a V8 Supercars driver.

== Business ==
In 1976, Noske established Kalari Transport with three trucks in Portland, Victoria. Having expanded the business to 70 trucks, in 1994, Noske sold the business to Swire. In 2005 Noske re-entered the logistics market establishing Noske Logistics.
