= 1987 Australian 2.0 Litre Touring Car Championship =

The 1987 Australian 2.0 Litre Touring Car Championship was a CAMS sanctioned Australian motor racing title open to Group A Touring Cars of under 2.0 litre engine capacity. The title was contested over a four-round series and was won by Mark Skaife driving a Nissan Gazelle.

This was the second Australian 2.0 Litre Touring Car Championship to be awarded by the Confederation of Australian Motor Sport. The title would be revived in 1993 for that year only.

== Calendar ==
The 1987 Australian 2.0 Litre Touring Car Championship was contested over a four-round series.

Round	Circuit	State	Date	Winning driver	Car
1	Winton	Victoria	22 March	John Smith	Toyota Corolla
2	Sandown Park	Victoria	7 June	Mark Skaife	Nissan Gazelle
3	Lakeside	Queensland	19 July	Mark Skaife	Nissan Gazelle
4	Amaroo Park	New South Wales	2 August	Mark Skaife	Nissan Gazelle

- Six rounds had been scheduled, however two were cancelled.
- The Sandown round was held concurrently with Round 7 of the 1987 Australian Touring Car Championship.

== Points system ==
Championship points were awarded at each round on the following basis:

Position	1st	2nd	3rd	4th	5th	6th	7th	8th	9th	10th	11th	12th	13th	14th	15th	16th	17th	18th	19th	20th
Points	30	27	24	21	19	17	15	14	13	12	11	10	9	8	7	6	5	4	3	2

== Results ==
Position	Driver	Car	Entrant	Winton	Sandown	Amaroo	Lakeside	Total
1	Mark Skaife	Nissan Gazelle	Nissan Motor Company	24	30	30	30	114
2	Drew Price	Toyota Corolla	Toyota Team Australia	27	24	24	27	102
3	John Faulkner	Toyota Corolla	Toyota Team Australia	21	21	21	24	87
4	John Smith	Toyota Corolla	Toyota Team Australia	30	27	27	-	84
5	David Ratcliff	Toyota Corolla Levin	Ratcliff Transport Spares	19	19	17	19	74
6	Garry Willmington	Toyota Sprinter	Bob Holden Motors	-	-	19	21	40
7	Bob Holden	Toyota Sprinter	Bob Holden Motors	17	-	-	17	34
8	Daryl Hendrick	Isuzu Gemini ZZ	Gemspares	13	17	-	-	30
9	Michael Birks	Toyota Sprinter	Bob Holden Motors	-	-	15	-	15
=	Mike Freeman	Toyota Celica	Michael Freeman	15	-	-	-	15
=	Mike Hall	Toyota Sprinter	Bob Holden Motors	-	15	-	-	15
=	Paul Miller	Ford Laser TX3	Paul Miller	-	-	-	15	15
13	Glenn Clark	Toyota Sprinter	Bob Holden Motors	14	-	-	-	14
14	Paul Jones	Toyota Corolla	Paul Jones	12	-	-	-	12
15	David Sala	Isuzu PF60 Gemini	David Sala	11	-	-	-	11
16	Lindsay Siebler	Suzuki Swift	Suzuki Parts	10	-	-	-	10

== See also ==
1987 Australian Touring Car season
