= Australian 2.0 Litre Touring Car Championship =

The Australian 2.0 Litre Touring Car Championship was a CAMS sanctioned Australian motor racing title contested in 1986, 1987 and 1993. The title was renamed to Australian Manufacturers' Championship for 1994 and then to Australian Super Touring Championship in 1995.

== Championship winners ==
Year	Driver	Car
1986	John Smith	Toyota Corolla
1987	Mark Skaife	Nissan Gazelle
1993	Peter Doulman	BMW M3
