= Gibson Motorsport =

Australian motor racing team, 1985-2003

- Manufacturer: Nissan (1985–1992); Holden (1993–2000); Ford (2001–2003)
- Team Principal: Howard Marsden (1981–1984); Fred Gibson (1986–1999); Garry Dumbrell (2000); Bob Forbes (2001–2003)
- Team Manager: Howard Marsden (1981–1984); Fred Gibson (1986–1999), (2001); Alan Heaphy (2001–2003)
- Race Drivers: George Fury, Fred Gibson, Masahiro Hasemi, Kazuyoshi Hoshino, Christine Gibson, Bob Muir, Glenn Seton, Gary Scott, Terry Shiel, Mark Skaife, John Bowe, Grant Jarrett, Anders Olofsson, Jim Richards, Garry Waldon, Drew Price, David Brabham, Colin Bond, Steven Richards, John Cleland, Darren Hossack, Steven Ellery, Darren Pate, David Parsons, Simon Wills, Greg Murphy, David "Truckie" Parsons, Craig Lowndes, Neil Crompton, Rodney Forbes, Neal Bates, Greg Ritter
- Chassis: Nissan Bluebird Turbo; Nissan Pulsar EXA; Nissan Skyline (RS DR30, GTS-R HR31); Nissan Gazelle (S12); Nissan GT-R (R32); Holden Commodore (VP, VR, VS, VT); Ford Falcon (AU, BA)
- Debut: 1981
- Drivers' Championships: 4 (1990, 1991, 1992, 1994)
- Round wins: 35
- 32nd (Ritter); 34th (Forbes)

Gibson Motorsport was an Australian motor racing team that competed in the Australian Touring Car Championship from 1985 until 2003, though the team had its roots in Gibson's "Road & Track" team which ran a series of Ford Falcon GTHOs in Series Production during the late 1960s and early 1970s. The name of the team was also the name of Fred Gibson's automotive business in Sydney. As Gibson was also a driver for the Ford Works Team, his team was sometimes a pseudo-works team when the Ford factory did not enter.

== History ==
=== Group C ===
The Nissan Motorsport Team was established by Howard Marsden in 1981 as a factory Nissan motorsport operation after Nissan decided to change from rallying to touring car racing. It made its debut in the 1981 James Hardie 1000 at Bathurst. A limited campaign in the 1982 Australian Touring Car Championship was followed by a more concerted effort in the 1982 Australian Endurance Championship, with Nissan winning the Makes title in that series. This was followed by full campaigns in 1983 and 1984. The 1.8-litre Bluebird turbo was fast but fragile, although George Fury did finish second in the 1983 Australian Touring Car Championship (without taking a round win) and took pole position in the 1984 James Hardie 1000 at Bathurst with a lap time that would stand as a record until 1990.

At one point of 1984, Marsden had gone to Japan to discuss Nissan's plans for the new Group A category, and when he returned he joined the team at a test session at Melbourne's Calder Park Raceway where lead driver Fury was substantially faster than ever before and had broken the existing touring car lap record on the 1.6 km circuit. Fred Gibson told the story that the normally placid Marsden went into a rage and threatened to fire the entire team on the spot when he found the Bluebird was fitted with a 2.0 litre turbo engine and not the 1.8-litre unit it raced with.

Fred Gibson, who gave the Bluebird turbo its first race win in Australian touring car racing during the 1983 AMSCAR Series at Sydney's Amaroo Park, retired from driving at the end of 1983 and in 1985 and accepted an offer from Howard Marsden to take over as team owner/manager, which included the Gibsons moving from their long time home in Sydney to Melbourne where the team had been based. He inherited next to no staff as most jumped ship at the prospect of working for Fred. Gibson later described the Bluebird Turbo as "a shithouse little car". One who did stay was a young apprentice mechanic and race driver named Glenn Seton who had joined the Nissan team in 1984 as Christine Gibson's co-driver in the Nissan Pulsar EXA turbo for Sandown and Bathurst. Glenn was later joined at the team by his father Barry Seton, a renowned Sydney engine builder, the 1965 Armstrong 500 winner and Fred Gibson's former team mate and co-driver in their Ford Works Team days. Bo, as he is known, joined Nissan as the teams chief engine builder.

=== Group A ===
==== 1986-1987 ====
After sitting out 1985 while Nissan sorted out the homologation of its first Group A car, Nissan reappeared in 1986 with two Nissan Skyline RS DR30s, one driven all year by longtime team driver George Fury, and the second shared between Gary Scott and Glenn Seton, with Scott claiming pole position for the 1986 James Hardie 1000 (Seton partnered Fury who qualified 3rd). In 1987, Seton drove the second car all year to 2nd place both in the 1987 ATCC and at the James Hardie 1000 at Bathurst which was also a round of the inaugural World Touring Car Championship. Seton's Skyline was co-driven at Bathurst by twice Australian Drivers' Champion and 1986 Volvo team driver John Bowe.

After Fury took four round wins in the 1986 Australian Touring Car Championship and finished an unlucky runner-up in the series to the Volvo 240T of Robbie Francevic, the Peter Jackson sponsored team scored its first big win when Fury and Seton led Scott and new team driver Terry Shiel to a 1–2 win at the 1986 Castrol 500 at Sandown Raceway, the traditional warm up event for the Bathurst 1000. Fury, partnered by Shiel, would back up to win his second Sandown 500 in 1987.

The Nissan team also raced a Nissan Gazelle in the 1987 Australian 2.0 Litre Touring Car Championship for 20-year-old Mark Skaife, who had previously shown good form finishing second in the 1985 and 1986 Ford Laser series held at Amaroo Park. Skaife, who had joined the Nissan team as a mechanic in 1987, went on to win the 2.0 Litre championship, winning three of the four rounds of the series to break the stranglehold that Toyota had on the baby car class. He was joined at Bathurst in the Gazelle by Adelaide Hills Nissan dealer and sports sedan driver Grant Jarrett. During qualifying, Jarrett was having trouble making the class cut off time and it looked as if the Gazelle, which due to the race being an FIA WTCC race was forced to run in a higher engine class than it did in Australia (putting it in the same class as the BMW M3), would be a non-qualifier. However, late in Friday qualifying Jarrett managed to make the cut. During the time Jarrett was on his qualifying run, Skaife was reportedly nowhere to be seen in the Nissan pits. When the car returned to the pits it was driven straight into the garage and the doors closed. Both drivers emerged a short time later, with Skaife having damp hair and a flushed face while Jarret looked more like he had just got out of a shower than a touring car. This led to speculation it was Skaife and not Jarrett who had just been in the car for its final qualifying run. The pair finished the race in 19th place after numerous mechanical problems which had started within the first 10 laps. Despite the speculation that he had not driven his fastest qualifying laps, in the race Jarrett proved his critics wrong and would be credited with a faster race lap than he recorded in qualifying. However, in a magazine interview almost 20 years later, Fred Gibson admitted that it was indeed Skaife who qualified the car using Jarrett's driving suit and helmet.

==== 1988-1990 ====
For 1988, the new Nissan Skyline HR31 GTS-R was introduced. The new car featured a 2.0 Litre turbocharged Straight-six engine which produced approximately 410 bhp (306 kW; 416 PS), almost 70 bhp (52 kW; 71 PS) more than the outdated DR30's turbocharged 4cyl engine. Also, the HR31 featured front and rear spoilers which helped with high speed stability, something the old car lacked with team drivers reporting the cars as being frightful to drive on the high speed Conrod Straight at Bathurst where they were reaching speeds up to 260 km/h (162 mph) in 1986.

Unfortunately for the team parts for the car were late in arriving as Nissan also had to supply to teams in Japan and Europe (the European Nissan team was in fact run by Howard Marsden). This saw the car not debuted until Round 5 in Adelaide in the hands of Seton. Seton and Fury alternated driving the car while the team built its second, and it would not be until Round 8 at Amaroo Park before that second car appeared. Despite the new cars tendency to be unreliable, especially with its transmission, Seton and Fury showed enough speed in the ATCC to give hope to an end of the Ford Sierra domination, though in reality the team was playing catch-up all year having to develop the car as they raced it. The car was also homologated with only a small capacity turbo which limited its power output, with power peaking at around 470 bhp (350 kW; 477 PS) in 1990.

At Sandown for the annual Sandown 500, the Fury / Skaife car had led for a number of laps (after all the leading Sierras except Allan Moffat's had retired or been delayed with mechanical problems), and Skaife was holding a 30-second lead over the Larry Perkins / Denny Hulme Holden Commodore V8, before retiring while in the lead on lap 94 with differential failure. The Seton / Anders Olofsson car (which Seton had qualified 3rd, though almost two seconds slower than Dick Johnson's pole winning time in a Sierra) had retired on the third lap of the race with the same transmission failure that would put it out within seconds of the start of the Tooheys 1000 a few weeks later. Until the homologation of a proper racing 5-speed Getrag gearbox from 1989, the GTS-R's biggest drawback was its production based transmission.

The team suffered a setback in August 1988 when Seton rolled the #15 Skyline during a media day at Bathurst. This would set the tone for a disastrous Tooheys 1000 campaign which saw both Skylines out by lap 17, with Seton's car destroying its gearbox as the green flag was waved to start the race (he made it only as far as the pit exit gate), while Fury's car was out with overheating after the fan belt flew off the engine at close to 250 km/h (155 mph) on Conrod Straight. Against a flock of the all-powerful Ford Sierra RS500s, Fury managed to qualify the Skyline in 10th place at Bathurst. He would use Seton's car in the "Tooheys Dozen" shootout as co-driver Mark Skaife had crashed the #30 car during practice and it was still under repair. Fury (10th) and Larry Perkins (8th), driving one of the new Holden Commodore VL SS Group A SVs, were the only non-Ford Sierra drivers to qualify in the Top 10 at Bathurst, though they were joined by the non-Fords of Peter Brock (BMW M3) and Nissan Europe driver Allan Grice (Commodore) in the shootout. 1988 was also the only year the shootout would not decide the top 10 grid positions for the race.

In 1989, title sponsor Philip Morris, who was dissatisfied at being given secondary status behind Nissan for their signage on the Skylines throughout 1988, offered its sponsorship dollars to Glenn Seton who had left to form his own team, Glenn Seton Racing. Twice ATCC champion and triple Bathurst winner Jim Richards was hired as a replacement. The team expanded to three cars for some events with Mark Skaife driving. Wins were achieved at the Winton ATCC round (Fury) and at the Sandown 500 (Richards/Skaife) with a 3rd and 4th placing at Bathurst. Driving the HR31, Richards was the only non-Ford Sierra RS500 driver to qualify for the Tooheys Top 10 pole runoff at Bathurst.

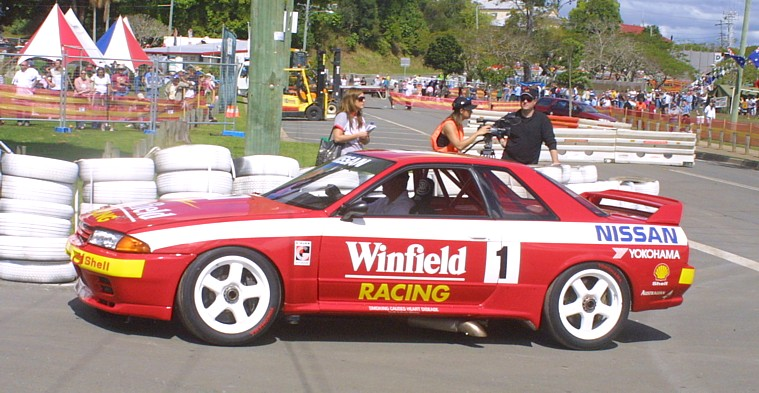
Nissan Skyline GT-R as raced in 1992

For 1990 the team reverted to two cars for Richards and Skaife with long time team driver George Fury let go by the team. At round 7 Skaife debuted the 4WD, twin-turbocharged Nissan Skyline GT-R at the Mallala Raceway. After qualifying 3rd, Skaife then showed what the previously dominant Sierra runners feared when he stormed to the front and was pulling away from the field before the car suffered a hub failure mid-race. Richards then moved into the GT-R for the last two rounds to win the series at Barbagallo and Oran Park. After finishing 4th in a quiet race in Perth, Richards won the race at Oran Park and secured the first ATCC win for both Nissan and Gibson.

The GT-R was favourite to qualify in pole at Bathurst, though brake dramas saw Richards only set 11th best time. In a move that was actually illegal (though it was not known until years later), after discovering problems with the GT-R following Saturday afternoon's final practice session, that night Gibson's team covertly swapped to their spare car (the ATCC car), including putting the Channel 7 Racecam unit into the car so that no one would be any wiser. Using the 'illegal' car, Richards started the race and stormed to the front in less than 10 laps, and despite long pit stops to replace brake pads, would remain a challenger before failing with drive-train failure, though the team was able to get the car back on the track and Richards and Skaife would finish 18th outright, 15 laps down on the winners.

==== 1991-1992 ====
In 1991, the team dominated winning all but a handful of races. Richards and Skaife completely dominated the Tooheys 1000 at Bathurst, easily claiming pole (Skaife), fastest lap (Skaife in the team's second car) and winning in race record time. Due to the demise of Group A in Australia after 1992, Skaife's pole time of 2:12.630 at Bathurst remains the fastest recorded Group A time on The Mountain.

Following Bathurst, the team were then set to take the race winning Richards/Skaife GT-R to the Fuji Speedway in Japan for the 1991 Fuji 500 race, but were asked not to do so by the head of NISMO in Japan. The Japanese company were fearful that the Australian built car would easily outpace and defeat the Japanese GT-Rs at Fuji after having seen at first hand the overwhelming speed of the Gibson built car at Bathurst. NISMO privately claimed that it would be bad for business for their own factory backed cars, as well as those of their customers, to be soundly beaten by an overseas built (although still factory backed) GT-R.

At the end of 1991, the team took their GT-R to New Zealand for the Nissan Mobil series which saw two 500 km races, the first on the streets of Wellington where Skaife qualified the car second behind the Schnitzer Motorsport BMW M3 Evolution of Formula One driver Emanuele Pirro. After leading early, various suspension problems on the bumpy street circuit saw Richards and Skaife finish 5 laps down in 3rd place. A week later for the Pukekohe 500 on a fast, open circuit which suited the twin-turbo Nissan, Skaife easily qualified on pole before he and Richards went on to a 43-second win over the Schnitzer BMW of Pirro and Joachim Winkelhock with the Holden Commodore of Peter Brock and Larry Perkins finishing 3rd. This saw the pair ultimately finish 2nd to Pirro/Winkelhock in the 1991 Nissan Mobil series.

For 1992, cigarette brand Winfield joined the team as title sponsor. During the season CAMS handicapped the GT-Rs in an attempt to bring it back to the field, which included upping the cars weight from 1360 to 1500 kg over the course of the year (40 kg was added before the ATCC and another 100 kg was added before the endurance races), as well as adding pop-off valves to the turbos to restrict power. In spite of this and the team's year long claim that the cars were no longer competitive (which even led to court action in a failed attempt to have the handicaps lifted), Mark Skaife won the 1992 Australian Touring Car Championship, and then again teamed with Jim Richards to win the crash shortened Tooheys 1000, with teammates Anders Olofsson and Neil Crompton finishing in third place. Richards went on to finish the turbo era in style when he drove the GT-R to win both of the "Clarke Shoes Group A Finale" races at the 1992 Australian Grand Prix in Adelaide.

=== V8 Supercars ===
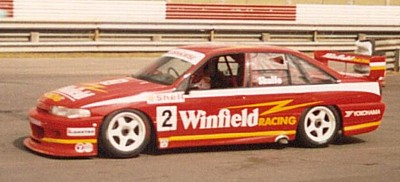
Holden VP Commodore of Mark Skaife at Lakeside International Raceway in April 1994

==== Holden ====
For 1993, Australian touring car racing moved to the 5.0L V8 formula open only to Ford and Holden (though at the time, naturally aspirated 2.0 litre cars were allowed by CAMS and actually had their own championship run concurrently with the ATCC. These cars would soon evolve into the Super Touring class). Given his previous history with Ford being a factory team driver for them in the 1960s and 1970s, and with Rothmans also leasing its fleet from Ford, it was expected that Fred Gibson would return to the Blue Oval. However, after being less than impressed with Ford's offered deal, and with a better financial package on offer from Holden, Gibson Motorsport elected to race Holden VP Commodores. The team started with two cars assembled with many customer Holden Racing Team and Perkins Engineering components. After a lacklustre championship for all Commodore runners after it was found that the aero package devised for the VP Commodore by Tom Walkinshaw Racing in 1992 wasn't right (this was rectified with a revised package in mid-ATCC which saw the Commodores, especially the Winfield cars, vastly more competitive), the team were on the pace at Bathurst, with Skaife and Richards qualifying and finishing 2nd behind the similar VP Commodore (though one running a Holden V8 engine rather than the Chevrolet V8 engine used by GMS and other top-level teams) of Larry Perkins and Gregg Hansford. The team's second Commodore driven by Anders Olofsson and David Brabham, who had also qualified in the top 10, finished in 4th place, two laps down on their teammates.

In 1994 after the aero revisions to the VP Commodores during the 1993 Australian Touring Car Championship (won easily by ex-Gibson driver Glenn Seton driving a Ford EB Falcon), Skaife won his second ATCC and the team's 4th overall. Bathurst was not so kind to the team. Skaife qualified the #1 VP Commodore in 3rd position and in the early (very) wet laps was battling for the lead with the HRT Commodore of Peter Brock and the Castrol Commodore of Perkins. Unfortunately their race ended on lap 39 with accident damage. The #2 car, driven by Olofsson and veteran Colin Bond in his last ever drive at Bathurst, started in 12th place and survived the wet/dry conditions throughout the day to finish 6th outright on the lead lap.

In practice at Eastern Creek in January 1995, Skaife had a major accident that kept him from driving in the opening round of the Touring Car Championship. This coupled with the need to find a new major sponsor following the federal government's decision to ban all tobacco advertising in Australia from 1 January 1996, and a mid-season workshop move saw the team off the pace throughout much of 1995, although Skaife would win the Eastern Creek round. At Bathurst, the Richards/Skaife car dominated the first 65 laps of the race, including showing some remarkable fuel economy (most of the Commodores and Falcons were pitting at around 28-30 laps while the #1 Winfield sponsored car first pitted on lap 38) before a broken tailshaft ended their race. The fuel economy did not seem to affect the Holden VR Commodore's performance as Skaife, who was in the car at the time of the failure, was building on the handy lead Richards had given him and was pulling away from the chasing Fords of Seton and John Bowe. The team's second car driven by Anders Oloffson and Jim Richards' son Steven went on to finish the race 4th outright.

From the end of 1995 tobacco sponsorship was outlawed. In a tight market, the team struggled to find a replacement sponsor, running just one plain white car in the opening rounds of 1996 ATCC for Skaife. Eventually some funding came the team's way from Sega and Holden's Network Q second hand division, but it was a long way short of the team's previous funding levels. As a result of the lack of funds, GMS was forced to release Jim Richards. The financial situation also saw the team fall behind on development which saw Skaife fall to 9th in the ATCC. The team then recruited dual BTCC champion John Cleland to partner Skaife at Bathurst where Skaife would qualify the car 9th and the pair would finish in a credible 7th outright.

The situation didn't improve in 1997 with the team having to miss some rounds due to funding issues and Skaife leaving the team at the end of the championship to first partner (at Sandown and Bathurst), then replace the retiring Peter Brock at the Holden Racing Team. A lifeline was thrown to the team by Garry Dumbrell, who contracted Gibson Motorsport to prepare his ex Gibson Motorsport Holden VS Commodore for the 1997 endurance races with Darren Hossack and Steven Ellery finishing 6th at Bathurst.

In 1998, the team expanded to three cars, two Wynns cars for Darren Hossack and Darren Pate and a third car for the Holden Young Lions entry for Steven Ellery which was sub-contracted by the Holden Racing Team.

For 1999, the team built two new VT Commodores and recruited Steven Richards and Greg Murphy to drive the Wynns sponsored cars. A development program saw Murphy win a race at Symmons Plains before the pair won at Bathurst

==== Garry Dumbrell ====
In December 1999 Fred Gibson sold the team to Garry Dumbrell. In 2000 the cars were sponsored by K-Mart with Richards winning in Canberra and the pair finishing 3rd at Bathurst.

==== Bob Forbes ====
With the category's star driver, Craig Lowndes, having negotiated his way out of his management contract with Tom Walkinshaw, he was expected to leave the Holden Racing Team at the end of 2000. Ford were very keen to gain his services and a deal was done that was portrayed as Fred Gibson buying back his old team and signing Lowndes to drive. It later emerged that it was Bob Forbes and not Fred Gibson who had bought the team from Garry Dumbrell, with Gibson only have purchased the Racing Entitlement Contract.

An ex Stone Brothers Racing Ford AU Falcon was purchased for Lowndes to race throughout the 2001 championship before a Gibson Motorsport car debuted at Bathurst. The team also ran a second car for Rodney Forbes. A falling-out between Forbes and Gibson saw the latter leave the team after Bathurst. As Forbes owned his own Racing Entitlement contract, Gibson sold his to Briggs Motor Sport.

For 2002, the team was rebranded as 00 Motorsport with Neil Crompton driving a second car. At the end of 2002, Ford withdrew their support with Lowndes and Crompton both leaving.

=== Demise ===
For 2003, two new BA Falcons were built for Rodney Forbes and Greg Ritter to race. The team closed after round 6 of the series. The Racing Entitlement Contract was sold to Team Brock and the hardware in 2004 to WPS Racing.

After leaving the team, Fred Gibson retained ownership of the team's Dandenong workshop. It was later leased to Paul Weel Racing and today is Garry Rogers Motorsport's base.

== Open Wheelers ==
Gibson Motorsport first competed in Open-wheel racing in the 1988 Australian Drivers' Championship (also known as the CAMS Gold Star), run for Formula 2 cars. In Round 4 of the championship at the Adelaide International Raceway, Glenn Seton drove a Nissan powered Ralt RT4 (allegedly owned by someone called "Dave Thompson") to an easy win over the open wheel regulars. Seton was to have had dual driving duties on the day, also debuting the HR31 Skyline in the ATCC race to which the Formula 2 cars were a support category. However, only one of the Skyline's was race ready and with Seton already driving the Ralt, George Fury was given the drive in the new Skyline. Seton almost got a second win in the Ralt during the 7th and last round of the championship at Sandown (where it was again Fury's turn in the Skyline) and was in a strong lead before he was forced into retirement.

The team entered a Spa FB001 for Mark Skaife to drive in the 1990 Australian Drivers' Championship for Formula Holden cars (like the Seton Ralt being run under the name "Dave Thompson", the Spa was run under the name of Skaife Racing P/L). Skaife would finish 3rd in the championship, winning Round 4 at Mallala in South Australia (the same day that Skaife gave the Nissan GT-R its ATCC debut) and Round 5 at Oran Park.

Mark Skaife would go on to win the Gold Star for Gibson in 1991, 1992 and 1993. His win in both the CAMS Gold Star and the ATCC in 1992 saw Skaife become the first, and so far only driver to win both championships in the same year, and he would complete the treble by partnering Jim Richards to win the crash shortened Bathurst 1000.

== Rebirth ==
In 2013, Fred Gibson reformed Gibson Motorsport as a race car preparer for cars participating in the Heritage Touring Cars series. Amongst its clients are the owners of former Gibson Motorsport Nissans. Some of the former race team personnel work on the cars, while former GMS drivers Jim Richards and Mark Skaife have both driven their former Nissan Skyline HR31 GTS-Rs in historic competition, while George Fury has also reunited with his Bathurst pole winning Bluebird Turbo.

== Championships ==
This is a list of championships and series won by Gibson Motorsport from 1981 to 2003 in touring car racing and open wheel racing.

Australian Manufacturers' Championship results have not been included as that title was awarded to the manufacturer (e.g. Nissan) rather than to an individual driver or team.

Year	Championship or Series	Driver	Car(s)
1987	Australian 2.0 Litre Touring Car Championship	(Australia) Mark Skaife	Nissan Gazelle
1990	Australian Touring Car Championship	(New Zealand) Jim Richards	Nissan Skyline HR31 GTS-R; Nissan Skyline R32 GT-R
1991	Australian Touring Car Championship	(New Zealand) Jim Richards	Nissan Skyline R32 GT-R
1991	Australian Drivers' Championship	(Australia) Mark Skaife	SPA 003 Holden
1992	Australian Touring Car Championship	(Australia) Mark Skaife	Nissan Skyline R32 GT-R
1992	Australian Drivers' Championship	(Australia) Mark Skaife	SPA 003 Holden
1992	AMSCAR Series	(Australia) Mark Skaife	Nissan Skyline R32 GT-R
1993	Australian Drivers' Championship	(Australia) Mark Skaife	Lola T91/50 Holden
1993	Aurora AFX AMSCAR Series	(Australia) Mark Skaife	Holden VP Commodore
1994	Australian Touring Car Championship	(Australia) Mark Skaife	Holden VP Commodore

== Bathurst 1000 Wins ==
Year	Class	No	Team name	Drivers	Chassis	Laps
Year	Class	No	Team name	Drivers	Engine	Laps
Group A
1991	1	1	Nissan Motorsport Australia	(New Zealand) Jim Richards (Australia) Mark Skaife	Nissan Skyline R32 GT-R	161
1991	1	1	Nissan Motorsport Australia	(New Zealand) Jim Richards (Australia) Mark Skaife	Nissan 2.6 L S6 Twin-turbo	161
1992	A	1	Winfield Team Nissan	(Australia) Mark Skaife (New Zealand) Jim Richards	Nissan Skyline R32 GT-R	143
1992	A	1	Winfield Team Nissan	(Australia) Mark Skaife (New Zealand) Jim Richards	Nissan 2.6 L S6 Twin-turbo	143
V8 Supercars
1999		7	Gibson Motorsport	(New Zealand) Steven Richards (New Zealand) Greg Murphy	Holden VT Commodore	161
1999		7	Gibson Motorsport	(New Zealand) Steven Richards (New Zealand) Greg Murphy	Holden 5.0 L V8	161

== Sandown 500 Wins ==
Year	Class	No	Team name	Drivers	Chassis	Laps
Year	Class	No	Team name	Drivers	Engine	Laps
1986	B	30	Peter Jackson Nissan Racing	(Australia) George Fury (Australia) Glenn Seton	Nissan Skyline DR30 RS	129
1986	B	30	Peter Jackson Nissan Racing	(Australia) George Fury (Australia) Glenn Seton	Nissan FJ20E 2.0 L I4 turbo	129
1987	B	30	Peter Jackson Nissan Racing	(Australia) George Fury (Australia) Terry Shiel	Nissan Skyline DR30 RS	129
1987	B	30	Peter Jackson Nissan Racing	(Australia) George Fury (Australia) Terry Shiel	Nissan FJ20E 2.0 L I4 turbo	129
1989	A	2	Nissan Motorsport Australia	(New Zealand) Jim Richards (Australia) Mark Skaife	Nissan Skyline HR31 GTS-R	161
1989	A	2	Nissan Motorsport Australia	(New Zealand) Jim Richards (Australia) Mark Skaife	Nissan RB20DET-R 2.0 L S6 turbo	161

== Other Touring Car Wins ==
Other non-ATCC/AMSCAR race wins by Gibson Motorsport (1981-2003) include:

- 1983 Silastic 300 at Amaroo Park - George Fury (Nissan Bluebird Turbo)
- 1983 Oran Park 250 at Oran Park Raceway - George Fury (Nissan Bluebird Turbo)
- 1983 Berri Fruit Juices Trophy at Calder Park Raceway (1983 Australian Grand Prix support race) - George Fury (Nissan Bluebird Turbo)
- 1984 Silastic 300 at Amaroo Park - Gary Scott (Nissan Bluebird Turbo)
- 1984 Australian Grand Prix support race at Calder Park Raceway - George Fury (Nissan Bluebird Turbo)
- 1986 BP Plus 300 at Surfers Paradise International Raceway - George Fury and Glenn Seton (Nissan Skyline DR30 RS)
- 1986 The Sun South Pacific 300 at Calder Park Raceway - George Fury and Glenn Seton (Nissan Skyline DR30 RS)
- 1986 Pepsi 250 at Oran Park Raceway - George Fury (Nissan Skyline DR30 RS)
- 1987 Yokohama/Bob Jane T-Marts 300 at Calder Park Raceway / Thunderdome - John Bowe and Terry Shiel (Nissan Skyline DR30 RS)
- 1990 Ansett Air Freight Challenge at Adelaide Street Circuit (1990 Australian Grand Prix support race #1) - Jim Richards (Nissan Skyline R32 GT-R)
- 1991 Hush Puppies Olympic Group A Challenge at Adelaide Street Circuit (1991 Australian Grand Prix support races #1 and #2) - Jim Richards (Nissan Skyline R32 GT-R)
- 1991 Nissan-Mobil 500 at Pukekohe Park Raceway (New Zealand) - Jim Richards and Mark Skaife (Nissan Skyline R32 GT-R)
- 1992 Clarks Shoes Group A Finale at Adelaide Street Circuit (1992 Australian Grand Prix support races #1 and #2) - Jim Richards (Nissan Skyline R32 GT-R)

== Drivers ==
Those who drove for Gibson Motorsport in its many guises in touring car racing during its 22 years of competition from 1981-2003 include (in order of appearance):

- (Australia) George Fury
- (Australia) Fred Gibson
- (Japan) Masahiro Hasemi
- (Japan) Kazuyoshi Hoshino
- (Australia) Christine Gibson
- (Australia) Bob Muir
- (Australia) Gary Scott
- (Australia) Glenn Seton
- (Australia) Terry Shiel
- (Australia) Mark Skaife
- (Australia) John Bowe
- (Australia) Grant Jarrett
- (Sweden) Anders Olofsson
- (New Zealand) Jim Richards
- (Australia) Garry Waldon
- (Australia) Drew Price
- (Australia) Neil Crompton
- (Australia) David Brabham
- (Australia) Colin Bond
- (New Zealand) Steven Richards
- (United Kingdom) John Cleland
- (Australia) Darren Hossack
- (Australia) Steven Ellery
- (Australia) Darren Pate
- (Australia) David Parsons
- (New Zealand) Simon Wills
- (New Zealand) Greg Murphy
- (Australia) David Parsons
- (Australia) Craig Lowndes
- (Australia) Rodney Forbes
- (Australia) Neal Bates
- (Australia) Greg Ritter

== Super2 drivers ==
- (Australia) Paul Dumbrell (2001)
- (Australia) David "Truckie" Parsons (2001)
