= Mark Skaife =

Australian racing driver (born 1967)

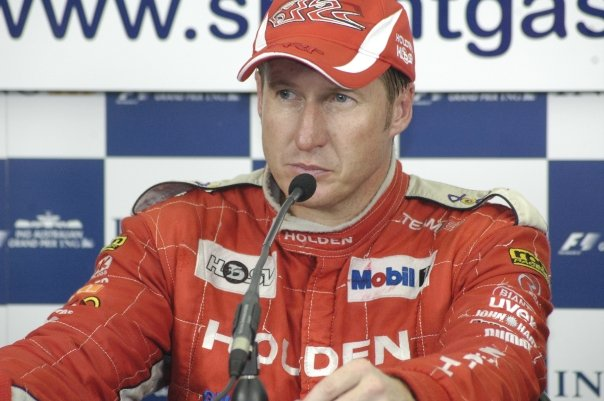
- Skaife at the Australian GP in 2006
- Nationality: Australian
- Born: Mark Stephen Skaife; 3 April 1967 (age 59) Gosford, New South Wales, Australia

Supercars Championship career
- Championships: 5 (1992, 1994, 2000, 2001, 2002)
- Races: 479
- Wins: 90
- Podiums: 203
- Pole positions: 41

Mark Stephen Skaife OAM (born 3 April 1967) is an Australian former racing driver. Skaife is a five-time champion of the V8 Supercar Championship Series, including its predecessor, the Australian Touring Car Championship, as well as a six-time Bathurst 1000 winner. On 29 October 2008, he announced his retirement from full-time touring car racing. Since retiring from driving, Skaife has worked as a commentator and presenter for the series for both the Seven Network and Fox Sports Australia.

Skaife is the director of motorsport for design and engineering consultancy - IEDM, which oversaw the reconfiguration of Albert Park Circuit - for which he has been working since he retired from racing.

== Biography ==
Skaife was born in Gosford, New South Wales, the son of touring car racer, Russell Skaife. Skaife is married to his second wife Toni and has three children: Mitch, Mia and Tilly – Mitch born from his first wife Belinda. He attended Wyong High School and is a known supporter of National Rugby League club the Manly-Warringah Sea Eagles.

In 2004, Skaife was awarded the Medal of the Order of Australia, for services to motor racing and charity. In 2006, Skaife set a Guinness World Record with the fastest speed of 277.16 km/h (172.21 mp/h) for a production ute, whilst driving a HSV Maloo in the Wimmera in Western Victoria.

In 2024, Skaife was inducted into the Sport Australia Hall of Fame.

== Racing career ==
=== Early years ===
Skaife began racing karts in the 1980s in his native New South Wales, before moving to Melbourne to complete his apprenticeship under Fred Gibson. His first car race was at Amaroo Park in 1984, at the wheel of a Holden Torana XU-1 sports sedan, which was partly built by his father, Russell. In 1985 Skaife joined the NSW Ford Laser Series, finishing second in the series. Skaife again finished runner up in the 1986 NSW Laser Series and winning the Victorian Series of the same year. Skaife was due to compete in his maiden race at Bathurst in 1986, however his co-driver and team owner, Peter Williamson, crashed the team's Toyota Celica Supra MA61 at close to 260 km/h (162 mph) during practice with Williamson suffering a broken jaw in the crash due to the cars onboard fire extinguisher breaking free of its mountings and hitting the veteran Sydney driver in the mouth (Williamson wore an open face helmet). Subsequently, with Williamson confined to a hospital bed in Bathurst and the Supra in need of major repair, the entry was withdrawn.

In 1987, Skaife won the Australian 2.0 Litre Touring Car Championship in a Gibson Motorsport prepared Nissan Gazelle, before finishing 19th on Bathurst 1000 debut in same car (co-driven by Grant Jarret). The Bathurst result was somewhat controversial due to some alleged cheating during final qualifying. In 1987 Bathurst had become a round of the inaugural World Touring Car Championship and under the FIA's rules, all drivers had to qualify within 110% of the fastest time in their class and within 130% of the fastest overall time. Due to the different class structure of the WTCC compared to the ATCC, the Gazelle was in Class 2 against the BMW M3 and Alfa Romeo 75 (instead of against the 1.6 L Toyota Corolla's) and during Friday qualifying Jarret had been struggling to post the required time and it looked like the car would be a non-qualifier. After struggling for speed, during the morning session Jarret suddenly found the pace required and managed to easily qualify for the race. However, it was alleged that it had actually been Skaife, dressed in Jarret's race suit and wearing his helmet, who had actually set the time with some pointing to the fact that Skaife was nowhere to be seen in the pits when Jarret allegedly set his qualifying time (after returning to the pits the car was driven straight into the Nissan team garage in the pit paddock with the door immediately closed which only fuelled the speculation). Nissan team boss Fred Gibson refuted these claims at the time but years later admitted that Skaife had indeed qualified the car as Jarret. Ironically Jarret's fastest race lap in the Gazelle (2:38.71) was actually faster than the qualifying time Skaife had set posing as Jarret (2:38.94).

During 1988, Skaife appeared at selected touring car events in Gibson's factory Nissan squad driving the Group A Nissan Skyline HR31 GTS-R. He failed to finish both the Sandown 500 (diff failure when Skaife was leading on lap 94 of 129) and Bathurst 1000 alongside George Fury (the Skyline, with Fury at the wheel, had lost its fan belt at full speed on Conrod Straight instantly cooking the turbocharged engine on just lap 17).

In 1989, Skaife made four ATCC starts as third driver in the Gibson Nissan team, starring in the wet at Winton on the way to fifth place. He paired with Jim Richards for endurance races, winning Sandown 500 before taking his first Bathurst 1000 podium in the Group A Nissan Skyline HR31 with third place.

Between 1991 and 1993, Skaife won three consecutive Australian Drivers Championships (ADC), earning three CAMS Gold Stars. In 1991 & 1992, he was driving the Spa 003, switching to the Lola T91/50 for 1993 each run by Gibson Motorsport.

=== Australian Touring Car Championship ATCC (1990–2001) ===
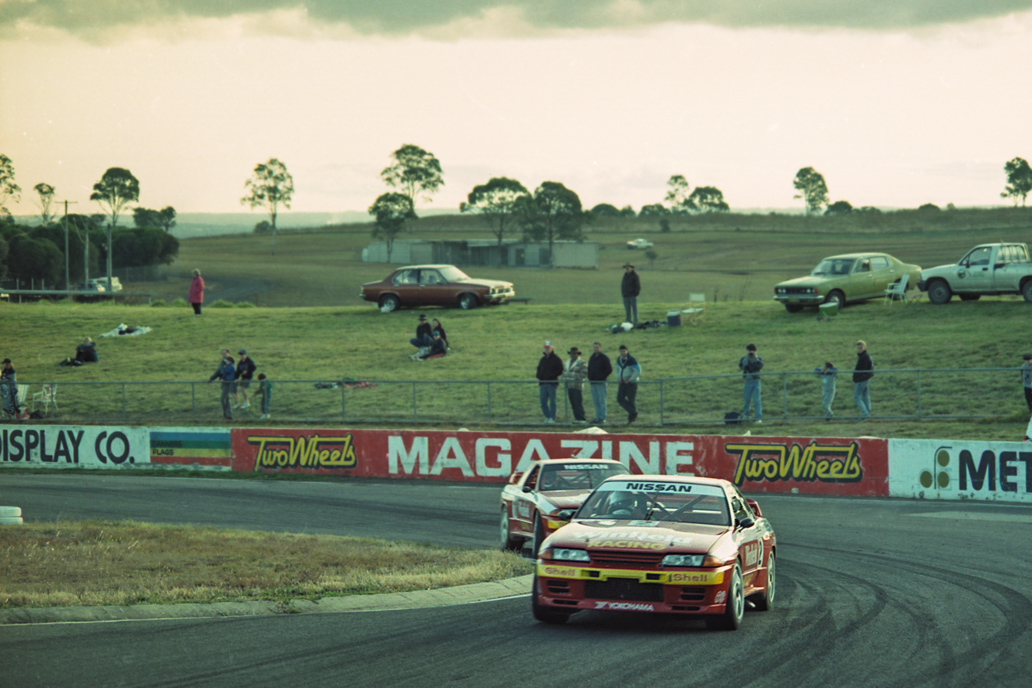
Skaife at the 1992 Oran Park ATCC round

1990 – Graduates to full-time drive with Nissan team following retirement of Fury. Finishes 14th in ATCC having switched from HR31 to R32 GT-R model Skyline midseason. Finishes 18th at Bathurst alongside Richards having suffered mechanical problems. Sustains back injury after rolling GT-R in Australian Grand Prix support race.

1991 – Wins three ATCC rounds, including his maiden victory at Round 3 at Wanneroo, WA. Skaife scores more points than any other driver during the season, but loses title to Jim Richards under drop-worst-round rules. Takes dominant Bathurst 1000 win (with Richards) in record total time, in the Nissan GT-R R32, which was the first Japanese car to win Bathurst. Also records a Bathurst DNF after driving the team's second car late in the race under cross-entering rules.

1992 – Wins four ATCC rounds on his way to the championship. Takes second Bathurst 1000 win with the GT-R R32 as the race was red flagged due to wet conditions.

1993 – Stays with Gibson team during switch from Nissan GT-R R32 to Holden Commodore VP under new Group 3A rules. Finishes sixth in ATCC after failing to win a round. Takes second at Bathurst alongside Richards following a race-long duel with eventual winners Larry Perkins and Gregg Hansford. Competes in FIA Touring Car World Cup at Monza with Nissan Castrol Racing, finishing 35th.

1994 – Wins four rounds (including first three in succession) on his way to a second ATCC title. Finishes second (with Richards) in first Sandown 500 start in five years. Crashes out early in wet conditions at Bathurst.

1995 – Misses opening ATCC round after enormous pre-season testing crash ahead of the Winfield Triple Challenge at Eastern Creek. Eventually finishes sixth in points standings with one round win driving the Holden Commodore VR. Leads Bathurst 1000 comfortably before mechanical trouble strikes nearing half distance.

1996 – Gibson team scales down to one car for ATCC following end of tobacco advertising. Finishes ninth in points with best round result of third. Records 13th in Sandown 500 (with Gary Waldon and Mark Noske) and seventh at Bathurst (with John Cleland).

1997 – Competes in just five of 10 ATCC rounds in the Holden Commodore VS as funding issues continue at Gibson team. Ends season 13th after best round result of third. Drives Lister Storm alongside Julian Bailey and Tommy Erdos in Le Mans 24 Hours, but fails to finish following mechanical issues. Makes first appearance with Mobil Holden Racing Team driving alongside Peter Brock in Sandown 500, scoring pole and finishing 12th. Again on pole at Bathurst but retires from the race while leading.

1998 – First full season with HRT, signed to replace Peter Brock, finishing third in ATCC without winning a round. Teams with Craig Lowndes in new VT model Commodore at Sandown to finish second. Pair show dominant form at Bathurst but finish just sixth after tyre issues.

1999 – Wins six rounds of Shell Championship Series (the most of any driver) but again finishes third in points in the Holden Commodore VT. Teams with Paul Morris for endurance races, recording 22nd in new Queensland 500 event (after being delayed by accident damage) and third at Bathurst.

2000 – Wins four rounds, including Clipsal 500 Adelaide and Queensland 500, on way to Shell Championship Series title. Seals championship with sixth place alongside Craig Lowndes in Bathurst finale.

2001 – Takes four round wins, including the Bathurst 1000 alongside Tony Longhurst, to claim Shell Championship Series title. Secures crown at penultimate event in Pukekohe – the first championship round to be held outside of Australia, driving the Holden Commodore VX.

=== V8 Supercars Championship Series (2002–2008) ===
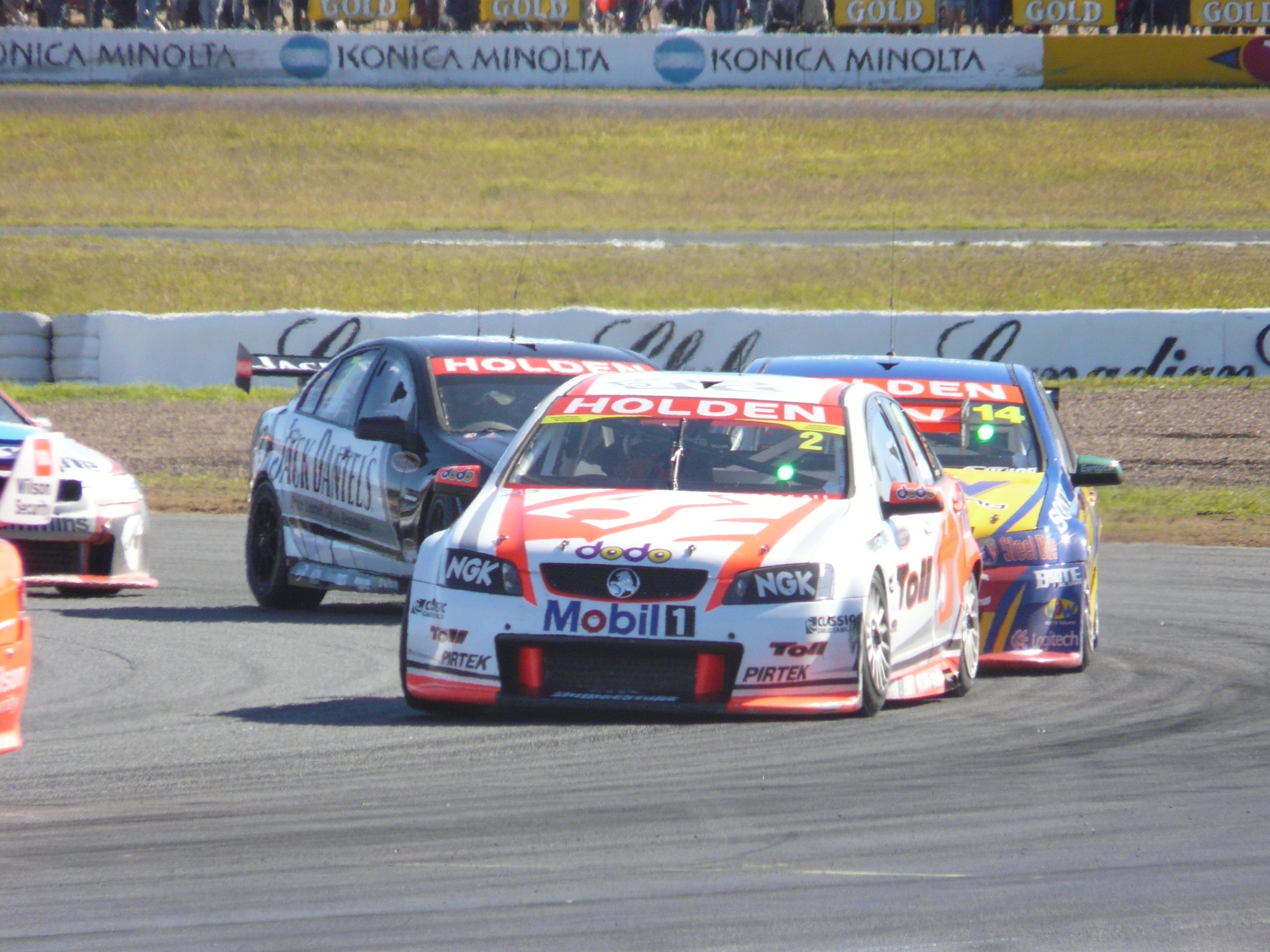
Skaife at the 2008 Ipswich 400

2002 – Enjoys dominant V8 Supercars Championship Series victory in the Holden Commodore VX, having won seven of the 13 rounds, including the first five in succession. Season highlights also include a fourth triumph in the Bathurst 1000, partnered by former teammate Jim Richards, and a second Clipsal 500 trophy.

2003 – Wins Clipsal 500 and Sandown 500 (alongside Todd Kelly) on his way to third in the championship in the Holden Commodore VY. Announced as new owner of Holden Racing Team mid-season following earlier collapse of founding owner Tom Walkinshaw Racing. Finishes eighth at Bathurst alongside Todd Kelly after late-race mechanical black flag for loose bodywork while running second. At the final race of the season at Eastern Creek Skaife and Russell Ingall were involved in a race incident in which both drivers were later fined by race officials. Both drivers also had points deducted, which left Skaife finishing the year in sixth place in the championship.

2004 – Fails to win a championship round for the first time in six years. Finishes season 12th in points with a best round result of second at Oran Park. Out of contention early at Bathurst with mechanical trouble (teamed with Todd Kelly).

2005 – Wins fifth Bathurst 1000 crown driving the Holden Commodore VZ, this time teamed with Todd Kelly. Records fifth place in V8 Supercars Championship Series.

2006 – Finishes only 16th in V8 Supercars Championship Series despite seven wins. Crashes out of Bathurst 1000 on opening lap after enduring mechanical issues while starting from pole position (teamed with Garth Tander).

2007 – Records eighth in V8 Supercars Championship Series with one round win, driving the Holden Commodore VE – finishing behind teammate Kelly in the standings for the fourth consecutive year. Misses Sandown 500 due to appendix surgery before crashing out of Bathurst 1000 in closing stages. Transfers partial ownership of HRT back to Tom Walkinshaw. Skaife reached 200 championship round starts in the final event of 2007.

2008 – Joined at HRT by the then reigning champion Garth Tander. Wins L&H 500 at Phillip Island alongside Garth Tander. Finishes 12th in Bathurst 1000 after mid-race crash. Confirms 2008 will be final season as full-time driver following Gold Coast event. Ends season 14th in points with a 27th place round result in Oran Park finale. Announces sale of remainder of HRT to Walkinshaw.

=== V8 Supercars Championship Series – Endurance Races (2009–2011) ===
Following Skaife's retirement from full-time driving, he announced that he would compete in the V8 Supercars endurance races for 2009, an arrangement that he continued into 2010 and 2011. This was a highly successful venture which gave Skaife further wins at Philip Island in 2010 & 2011 and his final Bathurst victory in 2010.

2009 – Skaife teams with Greg Murphy at Tasman Motorsport for endurance races, finishing 11th in Phillip Island 500 and fourth in Bathurst 1000.

2010 – Skaife joins TeamVodafone to win Phillip Island 500 and Bathurst 1000 alongside Craig Lowndes.

2011 – Skaife continues as an endurance-only driver in V8 Supercars Championship for third consecutive year. Teams with Lowndes to score second consecutive Phillip Island 500 victory before placing second in Bathurst 1000. Skaife announced on 17 October 2011, that he will retire as an endurance racer in order to take up the role as chairman of the newly formed V8 Supercars Commission.

Skaife ends his driving career with 482 race starts, 90 race wins, 42 event wins, 41 pole positions and 5 drivers championships.

== Media career ==
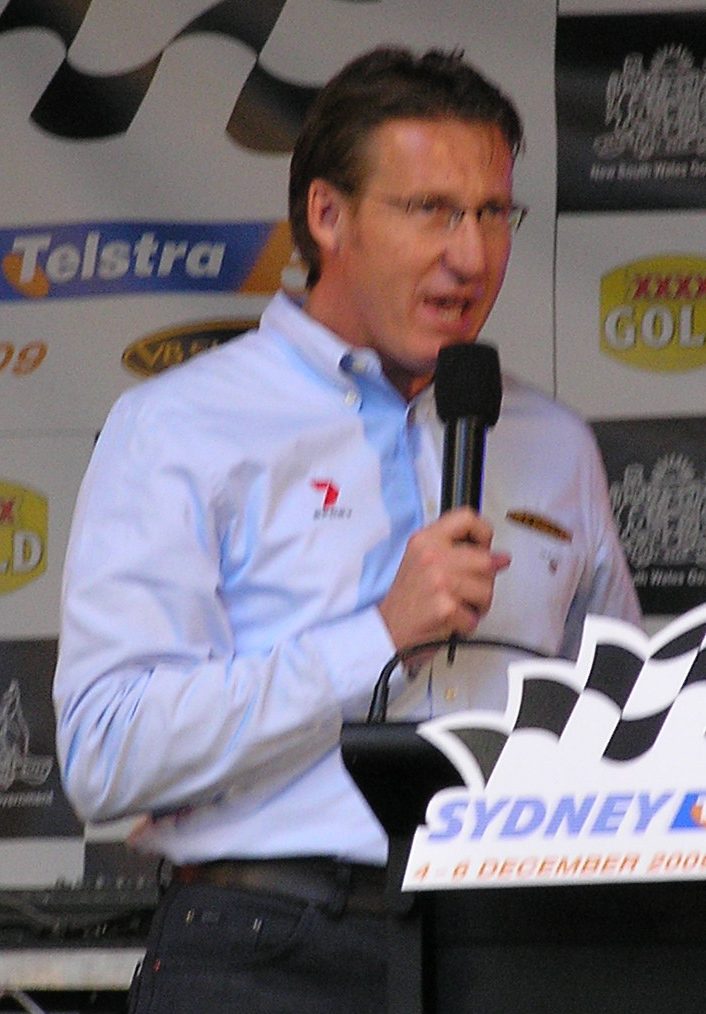
Skaife at the launch of the Sydney 500 in 2009

Skaife joined the Seven Network following his full-time retirement. He became a co-commentator for the V8 Supercars series alongside Neil Crompton and Matthew White, continuing in this position until Seven lost the rights after the 2014 season. In 2015, with the broadcast rights moving to a shared deal between Fox Sports and Network Ten, Skaife joined Fox Sports. He took on a presenter role, without commentating, and also co-hosted their V8 Supercars television series ‘’Inside Supercars’’. From 2016, Skaife returned to the commentary box as a commentator, whilst retaining his presenting roles at Fox Sports.

Skaife has four books published to as of 2020:

- Diary of a Champion (2002) by Mark Skaife
- The Racing Years (2009) by Andrew Clarke
- Life In The Fastlane (2010) by Mark Skaife & Andrew Clarke
- Mark Skaife: The Complete Illustrated Autobiography (2020) by Mark Skaife & Andrew Clarke

== Career results ==
Season	Series	Position	Car	Team
1985	New South Wales Laser Series	**2nd**	Ford Laser	Tyretown Racing
1986	New South Wales Laser Series	**2nd**	Ford Laser	Tyretown Racing
1986	Victorian Laser Series	**1st**	Ford Laser	Tyretown Racing
1987	Australian Touring Car Championship	17th	Nissan Gazelle	Peter Jackson Nissan Racing
1987	Australian 2.0 Litre Touring Car Championship	**1st**	Nissan Gazelle	Peter Jackson Nissan Racing
1989	Australian Touring Car Championship	9th	Nissan Skyline HR31 GTS-R	Nissan Motorsport Australia
1990	Australian Touring Car Championship	14th	Nissan Skyline HR31 GTS-R; Nissan Skyline R32 GT-R	Nissan Motorsport Australia
1990	Australian Drivers' Championship	**3rd**	Spa FB001 Holden	Skaife Racing P/L
1991	Australian Touring Car Championship	**2nd**	Nissan Skyline R32 GT-R	Nissan Motorsport Australia
1991	Australian Drivers' Championship	**1st**	Spa FB003 Holden	Gibson Motorsport
1992	Australian Touring Car Championship	**1st**	Nissan Skyline R32 GT-R	Winfield Team Nissan
1992	Australian Drivers' Championship	**1st**	Spa FB003 Holden	Winfield Racing
1992	FIA Formula 3000 International Championship	29th	Reynard 92D Mugen Honda	3001 International
1993	Australian Touring Car Championship	6th	Holden VP Commodore	Winfield Racing
1993	Aurora AFX AMSCAR Series	**1st**	Holden VP Commodore	Winfield Racing
1993	Australian Drivers' Championship	**1st**	Lola T91/50 Holden	Winfield Racing
1993	Touring Car World Cup	35th	Nissan Primera eGT	Nissan Castrol Racing
1994	Australian Touring Car Championship	**1st**	Holden VP Commodore	Gibson Motorsport
1995	Australian Touring Car Championship	6th	Holden VR Commodore	Gibson Motorsport
1995	Australian Drivers' Championship	7th	Lola T93/50 Holden	Gibson Motorsport
1996	Australian Touring Car Championship	9th	Holden VR Commodore	Gibson Motorsport
1997	Australian Touring Car Championship	13th	Holden VS Commodore	Gibson Motorsport
1998	Australian Touring Car Championship	**3rd**	Holden VS Commodore	Holden Racing Team
1999	Shell Championship Series	**3rd**	Holden VT Commodore	Holden Racing Team
2000	Shell Championship Series	**1st**	Holden VT Commodore	Holden Racing Team
2001	Shell Championship Series	**1st**	Holden VX Commodore	Holden Racing Team
2002	V8 Supercar Championship Series	**1st**	Holden VX Commodore	Holden Racing Team
2003	V8 Supercar Championship Series	**3rd**	Holden VY Commodore	Holden Racing Team
2004	V8 Supercar Championship Series	12th	Holden VY Commodore	Holden Racing Team
2005	V8 Supercar Championship Series	5th	Holden VZ Commodore	Holden Racing Team
2006	V8 Supercar Championship Series	16th	Holden VZ Commodore	Holden Racing Team
2007	V8 Supercar Championship Series	8th	Holden VE Commodore	Holden Racing Team
2008	V8 Supercar Championship Series	14th	Holden VE Commodore	Holden Racing Team
2009	V8 Supercar Championship Series	31st	Holden VE Commodore	Tasman Motorsport
2010	V8 Supercar Championship Series	33rd	Holden VE Commodore	Triple Eight Race Engineering
2011	International V8 Supercars Championship	29th	Holden VE Commodore	Triple Eight Race Engineering
2012	Australian Carrera Cup Championship	21st	Porsche 997 GT3 Cup	Porsche Cars Australia

=== Supercars Championship results ===
(Races in bold indicate pole position) (Races in italics indicate fastest lap)

Supercars results
Year	Team	Car	1	2	3	4	5	6	7	8	9	10	11	12	13	14	15	16	17	18	19	20	21	22	23	24	25	26	27	28	29	30	31	32	33	34	35	36	37	38	39	Position	Points
1987	Peter Jackson Nissan Racing	Nissan Gazelle	CAL; R1	SYM; R2	LAK; R3	BAR; R4	ADE; R5	SUR; R6	SAN; R7; 12	AMA; R8	ORA; R9																															17th	9
1989	Nissan Motorsport Australia	Nissan Skyline HR31 GTS-R	AMA; R1	SYM; R2	LAK; R3	BAR; R4	MAL; R5; 5	SAN; R6; 10	WIN; R7; 3	ORA; R8; 10																																9th	22
1990	Nissan Motorsport Australia	Nissan Skyline R32 GT-R	AMA; R1; Ret	SYM; R2	PHI; R3; DNS	WIN; R4; Ret	LAK; R5; 6	MAL; R6; Ret	WAN; R7; Ret	ORA; R8; 8																																14th	9
1991	Nissan Motorsport Australia	Nissan Skyline R32 GT-R	SAN; R1; 2	SYM; R2; 2	WAN; R3; 1	LAK; R4; 2	WIN; R5; 2	AMA; R6; 3	MAL; R7; 1	LAK; R8; 4	ORA; R9; 1																															2nd	132
1992	Winfield Team Nissan	Nissan Skyline R32 GT-R	AMA; R1; 3	AMA; R2; 1	SAN; R3; 3	SAN; R4; 2	SYM; R5; 3	SYM; R6; 3	**WIN**; **R7**; **1**	**WIN**; **R8**; **1**	LAK; R9; 2	LAK; R10; 7	EAS; R11; 3	EAS; R12; 2	MAL; R13; 1	**MAL**; **R14**; **1**	WAN; R15; 7	WAN; R16; 11	ORA; R17; 2	**ORA**; **R18**; **1**																						1st	234
1993	Winfield Racing Team	Holden VP Commodore	AMA; R1; 2	AMA; R2; 2	SYM; R3; 16	SYM; R4; 6	PHI; R5; 9	PHI; R6; 11	LAK; R7; 13	LAK; R8; 13	WIN; R9; Ret	WIN; R10; 8	EAS; R11; Ret	EAS; R12; 5	**MAL**; **R13**; **1**	**MAL**; **R14**; **2**	**WAN**; **R15**; **1**	**WAN**; **R15**; **1**	ORA; R18; 11	ORA; R18; Ret																						6th	87
1994	Gibson Motorsport	Holden VP Commodore	**AMA**; **R1**; **1**	**AMA**; **R2**; **1**	SAN; R3; 1	**SAN**; **R4**; **1**	**SYM**; **R5**; **1**	**SYM**; **R6**; **1**	PHI; R7; 2	PHI; R8; 3	LAK; R9; 4	LAK; R10; 4	WIN; R11; 3	WIN; R12; 2	EAS; R13; 2	EAS; R14; 3	MAL; R15; 2	MAL; R15; 1	**BAR**; **R18**; **Ret**	BAR; R18; 9	ORA; R19; Ret	ORA; R20; Ret																				1st	285
1995	Gibson Motorsport	Holden VR Commodore	SAN; R1	SAN; R2	SYM; R3; 13	SYM; R4; 10	BAT; R5; 4	BAT; R6; 1	PHI; R7; 11	PHI; R8; 6	LAK; R9; 7	LAK; R10; 6	WIN; R11; Ret	WIN; R12; 7	EAS; R13; 3	EAS; R14; 1	MAL; R15; Ret	MAL; R16; 5	BAR; R17; 7	BAR; R18; 4	ORA; R19; 4	ORA; R20; Ret																				6th	149
1996	Gibson Motorsport	Holden VR Commodore	EAS; R1; 6	EAS; R2; Ret	EAS; R3; DNS	SAN; R4; 5	SAN; R5; 3	SAN; R6; 2	BAT; R7; 7	BAT; R8; 6	BAT; R9; 9	SYM; R10; Ret	SYM; R11; 7	SYM; R12; 5	PHI; R13; 15	PHI; R14; Ret	PHI; R15; Ret	CAL; R16; 6	CAL; R17; 8	CAL; R18; 8	LAK; R19; 8	LAK; R20; Ret	LAK; R21; 7	BAR; R22; 7	BAR; R23; 6	BAR; R24; 4	MAL; R25; 3	MAL; R26; 10	MAL; R27; Ret	ORA; R28; 6	ORA; R29; 6	ORA; R30; 3										9th	177
1997	Gibson Motorsport	Holden VS Commodore	CAL; R1; 4	CAL; R2; 4	CAL; R3; 12	PHI; R4	PHI; R5	PHI; R6	SAN; R7; 3	SAN; R8; 4	SAN; R9; 4	SYM; R10	SYM; R11	SYM; R12	WIN; R13; 8	WIN; R14; Ret	WIN; R15; DNS	EAS; R16; 12	EAS; R17; 8	EAS; R18; 18	LAK; R19	LAK; R20	LAK; R21	BAR; R22	BAR; R23	BAR; R24	MAL; R25; Ret	MAL; R26; DNS	MAL; R27; 8	ORA; R28	ORA; R29	ORA; R30										13th	166
1998	Holden Racing Team	Holden VS Commodore	SAN; R1; 7	SAN; R2; 6	SAN; R3; 8	SYM; R4; 2	SYM; R5; 2	SYM; R6; 2	LAK; R7; 19	LAK; R8; 9	LAK; R9; 7	PHI; R10; 1	PHI; R11; 2	PHI; R12; 21	WIN; R13; 6	WIN; R14; 5	WIN; R15; 2	MAL; R16; DSQ	MAL; R17; DSQ	MAL; R18; 8	BAR; R19; 2	BAR; R20; 2	BAR; R21; 3	CAL; R22; 2	CAL; R23; 5	CAL; R24; C	HDV; R25; 2	HDV; R26; DNS	HDV; R27; 9	ORA; R28; 2	ORA; R29; 2	ORA; R30; 2										3rd	768
1999	Holden Racing Team	Holden VT Commodore	EAS; R1; 1	EAS; R2; 1	EAS; R3; 2	ADE; R4; 10	ADE; R5; Ret	BAR; R6; 2	BAR; R7; 8	BAR; R8; 17	PHI; R9; 1	PHI; R10; 1	PHI; R11; 2	HDV; R12; 7	HDV; R13; 7	HDV; R14; 5	SAN; R15; 1	SAN; R16; 1	SAN; R16; 2	QLD; R18; 4	QLD; R19; 4	QLD; R20; 11	CAL; R21; 2	CAL; R22; 1	CAL; R23; 2	SYM; R24; 2	SYM; R25; 1	SYM; R26; 1	WIN; R27; 8	WIN; R28; 6	WIN; R29; 11	ORA; R30; 1	ORA; R31; 1	ORA; R32; 1	QLD; R33; 22	BAT; R34; 3						3rd	1656
2000	Holden Racing Team	Holden VT Commodore	EAS; R1; 3	EAS; R2; 2	EAS; R3; 1	ADE; R4; 1	BAR; R5; 1	BAR; R6; 1	BAR; R7; 1	PHI; R8; 2	PHI; R9; 2	PHI; R10; 1	HID; R11; 3	HID; R12; 3	HID; R13; Ret	SAN; R14; 2	SAN; R15; 2	SAN; R16; 1	QLD; R17; 3	QLD; R18; 1	QLD; R19; 5	CAL; R20; 1	CAL; R21; Ret	CAL; R22; DNS	SYM; R23	SYM; R24	SYM; R25	WIN; R26; 16	WIN; R27; 7	WIN; R28; 5	ORA; R29; 2	ORA; R30; 2	ORA; R31; 2	QLD; R32; 3	BAT; R33; 2							1st	1570
2001	Holden Racing Team	Holden VX Commodore	**PHI**; **R1**; **1**	**PHI**; **R2**; **1**	ADE; R3; 4	ADE; R4; 9	EAS; R5; 2	EAS; R6; 1	**HDV**; **R7**; **14**	HDV; R8; 3	HDV; R9; 1	CAN; R10; 3	CAN; R11; 24	CAN; R12; 1	BAR; R13; 2	BAR; R14; 2	BAR; R15; 2	**CAL**; **R16**; **25**	CAL; R17; 11	CAL; R18; 18	ORA; R19; 1	**ORA**; **R20**; **1**	QLD; R21; 4	WIN; R22; 3	WIN; R23; 2	BAT; R24; 1	PUK; R25; 3	PUK; R26; 2	PUK; R27; 3	**SAN**; **R28**; **1**	**SAN**; **R29**; **4**	SAN; R30; Ret										1st	3478
2002	Holden Racing Team	Holden VX Commodore	**ADE**; **R1**; **1**	**ADE**; **R2**; **1**	PHI; R3; 2	PHI; R4; 1	**EAS**; **R5**; **1**	**EAS**; **R6**; **1**	**EAS**; **R7**; **1**	HDV; R8; 2	HDV; R9; 1	**HDV**; **R10**; **1**	CAN; R11; 1	CAN; R12; 13	CAN; R13; 1	**BAR**; **R14**; **1**	**BAR**; **R15**; **Ret**	BAR; R16; 7	ORA; R17; 1	**ORA**; **R18**; **1**	WIN; R19; 4	WIN; R20; 9	QLD; R21; Ret	**BAT**; **R22**; **1**	SUR; R23; 24	SUR; R24; Ret	PUK; R25; 1	**PUK**; **R26**; **Ret**	PUK; R27; Ret	SAN; R28; 5	SAN; R29; 2											1st	2227
2003	Holden Racing Team	Holden VY Commodore	ADE; R1; 2	ADE; R1; 1	**PHI**; **R3**; **6**	EAS; R4; 19	WIN; R5; 6	BAR; R6; 2	BAR; R7; 1	**BAR**; **R8**; **23**	**HDV**; **R9**; **1**	**HDV**; **R10**; **2**	HDV; R11; 3	QLD; R12; Ret	ORA; R13; 3	SAN; R14; 1	BAT; R15; 8	SUR; R16; 3	SUR; R17; 3	PUK; R18; 7	PUK; R19; 2	PUK; R20; 1	**EAS**; **R21**; **7**	EAS; R22; Ret																		3rd	1817
2004	Holden Racing Team	Holden VX Commodore	ADE; R1; 7	ADE; R2; 17	EAS; R3; 22	**PUK**; **R4**; **16**	PUK; R5; Ret	PUK; R6; 19	HDV; R7; 14	HDV; R8; 9	HDV; R9; 7	BAR; R10; 1	**BAR**; **R11**; **15**	BAR; R12; 9	QLD; R13; Ret	WIN; R14; 28	**ORA**; **R15**; **1**	ORA; R16; 2	SAN; R17; 23	BAT; R18; 14	**SUR**; **R19**; **24**	SUR; R20; 13	SYM; R21; Ret	SYM; R22; Ret	SYM; R23; 3	EAS; R24; 18	EAS; R25; 7	EAS; R26; 2														12th	1294
2005	Holden Racing Team	Holden VZ Commodore	ADE; R1; Ret	ADE; R2; 3	PUK; R3; 3	PUK; R4; 4	PUK; R5; 5	BAR; R6; 1	**BAR**; **R7**; **29**	BAR; R8; 6	EAS; R9; 7	EAS; R10; 7	**SHA**; **R11**; **3**	SHA; R12; 1	**SHA**; **R13**; **23**	**HDV**; **R14**; **2**	HDV; R15; 2	HDV; R16; 26	QLD; R17; 12	ORA; R18; 16	ORA; R19; 30	SAN; R20; 2	BAT; R21; 1	SUR; R22; 3	SUR; R23; 3	SUR; R24; 2	SYM; R25; 25	SYM; R26; 12	SYM; R27; 9	PHI; R28; 15	PHI; R29; 10	PHI; R30; 8										5th	1754
2006	Holden Racing Team	Holden VZ Commodore	**ADE**; **R1**; **Ret**	ADE; R2; Ret	PUK; R3; 1	PUK; R4; 5	**PUK**; **R5**; **1**	**BAR**; **R6**; **1**	BAR; R7; 18	BAR; R8; 1	WIN; R9; 5	WIN; R10; 17	WIN; R11; 3	HDV; R12; 1	HDV; R13; 28	HDV; R14; 6	QLD; R15; 21	QLD; R16; 1	QLD; R17; 27	ORA; R18; Ret	ORA; R19; 1	ORA; R20; 23	SAN; R21; 26	**BAT**; **R22**; **Ret**	SUR; R23; 25	SUR; R24; 21	SUR; R25; Ret	**SYM**; **R26**; **16**	SYM; R27; Ret	SYM; R28; Ret	BHR; R29; 7	BHR; R30; 19	BHR; R31; 4	PHI; R32; 3	PHI; R33; 6	PHI; R34; 11						16th	2036
2007	Holden Racing Team	Holden VE Commodore	ADE; R1; 14	ADE; R2; 7	BAR; R3; 3	BAR; R4; 3	BAR; R5; 2	PUK; R6; 10	PUK; R7; 6	PUK; R8; 9	WIN; R9; 21	WIN; R10; 17	WIN; R11; 26	EAS; R12; 1	**EAS**; **R13**; **1**	**EAS**; **R14**; **3**	HDV; R15; 1	**HDV**; **R16**; **5**	HDV; R17; 5	QLD; R18; 2	QLD; R19; 8	QLD; R20; 17	ORA; R21; 1	ORA; R22; 20	**ORA**; **R23**; **Ret**	SAN; R24	BAT; R25; Ret	SUR; R26; 17	SUR; R27; 8	SUR; R28; Ret	BHR; R29; 7	BHR; R30; 18	BHR; R31; 21	SYM; R32; 7	SYM; R33; 4	SYM; R34; 4	PHI; R35; 2	PHI; R36; 5	PHI; R37; 7			8th	379
2008	Holden Racing Team	Holden VE Commodore	ADE; R1; 9	ADE; R2; 17	EAS; R3; 6	EAS; R4; 14	EAS; R5; 5	HAM; R6; 18	HAM; R7; 23	HAM; R8; 12	BAR; R9; 2	BAR; R10; Ret	BAR; R11; DNS	SAN; R12; 10	SAN; R13; 18	SAN; R14; 22	HDV; R15; 25	HDV; R16; 8	HDV; R17; 18	QLD; R18; 5	QLD; R19; 10	QLD; R20; 9	WIN; R21; 12	WIN; R22; Ret	WIN; R23; DNS	PHI; Q 15	PHI; R24; 1	BAT; R25; 12	SUR; R26; 16	SUR; R27; 16	SUR; R28; 14	BHR; R29; Ret	BHR; R30; 17	BHR; R31; Ret	SYM; R32; 25	SYM; R33; 24	SYM; R34; 15	ORA; R35; Ret	ORA; R36; Ret	ORA; R37; 12		14th	1644
2009	Tasman Motorsport	Holden VE Commodore	ADE; R1	ADE; R2	HAM; R3	HAM; R4	WIN; R5	WIN; R6	SYM; R7	SYM; R8	HDV; R9	HDV; R10	TOW; R11	TOW; R12	SAN; R13	SAN; R14	QLD; R15	QLD; R16	PHI; Q 21	PHI; R17; 11	BAT; R18; 4	SUR; R19	SUR; R20	SUR; R21	SUR; R22	PHI; R23	PHI; R24	BAR; R25	BAR; R26	SYD; R27	SYD; R28											31st	372
2010	Triple Eight Race Engineering	Holden VE Commodore	YMC; R1	YMC; R2	BHR; R3	BHR; R4	ADE; R5	ADE; R6	HAM; R7	HAM; R8	QLD; R9	QLD; R10	WIN; R11	WIN; R12	HDV; R13	HDV; R14	TOW; R15	TOW; R16	PHI; R17; 1	BAT; R18; 1	SUR; R19	SUR; R20	SYM; R21	SYM; R22	SAN; R23	SAN; R24	SYD; R25	SYD; R26														33rd	560
2011	Triple Eight Race Engineering	Holden VE Commodore	YMC; R1	YMC; R2	ADE; R3	ADE; R4	HAM; R5	HAM; R6	BAR; R7	BAR; R8	BAR; R9	WIN; R10	WIN; R11	HID; R12	HID; R13	TOW; R14	TOW; R15	QLD; R16	QLD; R17	QLD; R18	PHI; R19; 1	BAT; R20; 2	SUR; R21	SUR; R22	SYM; R23	SYM; R24	SAN; R25	SAN; R26	SYD; R27	SYD; R28												29th	532

=== Complete Bathurst 1000 results ===
Year	No.	Team	Co-drivers	Car	Class	Laps	Overall position	Class position
1986	77	(Australia) Peter Williamson Toyota	(Australia) Peter Williamson	Toyota Celica Supra	B	–	DNS	DNS
1987	60	(Australia) Peter Jackson Nissan Racing	(Australia) Grant Jarrett	Nissan Gazelle	2	138	19th	7th
1988	15	(Australia) Peter Jackson Nissan Racing	(Australia) George Fury	Nissan Skyline HR31 GTS-R	A	17	DNF	DNF
1989	2	Nissan Motorsport Australia	(New Zealand) Jim Richards	Nissan Skyline HR31 GTS-R	A	160	**3rd**	**3rd**
1990	1	Nissan Motorsport Australia	(New Zealand) Jim Richards	Nissan Skyline R32 GT-R	1	146	18th	16th
1991	1	Nissan Motorsport Australia	(New Zealand) Jim Richards	Nissan Skyline R32 GT-R	1	161	**1st**	**1st**
1991	2	Nissan Motorsport Australia	(Australia) Drew Price (Australia) Garry Waldon	Nissan Skyline R32 GT-R	1	135	DNF	DNF
1992	1	(Australia) Winfield Team Nissan	(New Zealand) Jim Richards	Nissan Skyline R32 GT-R	A	143	**1st**	**1st**
1993	1	(Australia) Winfield Racing Team	(New Zealand) Jim Richards	Holden VP Commodore	A	161	**2nd**	**2nd**
1994	2	(Australia) Winfield Racing	(New Zealand) Jim Richards	Holden VP Commodore	A	39	DNF	DNF
1995	1	(Australia) Winfield Racing	(New Zealand) Jim Richards	Holden VR Commodore		65	DNF	DNF
1996	2	(Australia) Gibson Team Sega	(United Kingdom) John Cleland	Holden VR Commodore		159	7th	7th
1997	05	(Australia) Holden Racing Team	(Australia) Peter Brock	Holden VS Commodore	L1	52	DNF	DNF
1998	1	(Australia) Holden Racing Team	(Australia) Craig Lowndes	Holden VT Commodore	OC	159	6th	6th
1999	2	(Australia) Holden Racing Team	(Australia) Paul Morris	Holden VT Commodore		161	**3rd**	**3rd**
2000	1	(Australia) Holden Racing Team	(Australia) Craig Lowndes	Holden VT Commodore	OC	161	6th	6th
2001	1	(Australia) Holden Racing Team	(Australia) Tony Longhurst	Holden VX Commodore		161	**1st**	**1st**
2002	1	(Australia) Holden Racing Team	(New Zealand) Jim Richards	Holden VX Commodore		161	**1st**	**1st**
2003	1	(Australia) Holden Racing Team	(Australia) Todd Kelly	Holden VY Commodore		161	8th	8th
2004	2	(Australia) Holden Racing Team	(Australia) Todd Kelly	Holden VY Commodore		159	14th	14th
2005	2	(Australia) Holden Racing Team	(Australia) Todd Kelly	Holden VZ Commodore		161	**1st**	**1st**
2006	2	(Australia) Holden Racing Team	(Australia) Garth Tander	Holden VZ Commodore		0	DNF	DNF
2007	2	(Australia) Holden Racing Team	(Australia) Todd Kelly	Holden VE Commodore		149	DNF	DNF
2008	1	(Australia) Holden Racing Team	(Australia) Garth Tander	Holden VE Commodore		160	12th	12th
2009	51	(Australia) Tasman Motorsport	(New Zealand) Greg Murphy	Holden VE Commodore		161	4th	4th
2010	888	(Australia) Triple Eight Race Engineering	(Australia) Craig Lowndes	Holden VE Commodore		161	**1st**	**1st**
2011	888	(Australia) Triple Eight Race Engineering	(Australia) Craig Lowndes	Holden VE Commodore		161	**2nd**	**2nd**

=== Complete Sandown endurance results ===
Year	Team	Co-drivers	Car	Class	Laps	Overall position	Class position
1986	(Australia) Peter Williamson Toyota	(Australia) Peter Williamson	Toyota Celica Supra	B	125	10th	10th
1987	(Australia) Peter Jackson Nissan Racing	(Australia) Grant Jarrett	Nissan Gazelle	C	121	10th	**1st**
1988	(Australia) Peter Jackson Nissan Racing	(Australia) George Fury	Nissan Skyline HR31 GTS-R	A	94	DNF	DNF
1989	Nissan Motorsport Australia	(New Zealand) Jim Richards	Nissan Skyline HR31 GTS-R	A	161	**1st**	**1st**
1994	(Australia) Winfield Racing	(New Zealand) Jim Richards	Holden VP Commodore	V8	161	**2nd**	**2nd**
1995	(Australia) Winfield Racing	(New Zealand) Jim Richards	Holden VR Commodore		155	8th	8th
1996	(Australia) Gibson Team Sega	(Australia) Gary Waldon (Australia) Mark Noske	Holden VR Commodore		138	13th	13th
1997	(Australia) Holden Racing Team	(Australia) Peter Brock	Holden VS Commodore		150	12th	12th
1998	(Australia) Holden Racing Team	(Australia) Craig Lowndes	Holden VT Commodore	OC	147	**2nd**	**2nd**
2003	(Australia) Holden Racing Team	(Australia) Todd Kelly	Holden VY Commodore		141	**1st**	**1st**
2004	(Australia) Holden Racing Team	(Australia) Todd Kelly	Holden VY Commodore		133	23rd	23rd
2005	(Australia) Holden Racing Team	(Australia) Todd Kelly	Holden VZ Commodore		161	**2nd**	**2nd**
2006	(Australia) Holden Racing Team	(Australia) Garth Tander	Holden VZ Commodore		149	26th	26th

=== Complete World Touring Car Championship results ===
(key) (Races in bold indicate pole position) (Races in italics indicate fastest lap)

Year	Team	Car	1	2	3	4	5	6	7	8	9	10	11	DC	Points
1987	Peter Jackson Nissan Racing	Nissan Gazelle	MNZ	JAR	DIJ	NUR	SPA	BNO	SIL	BAT; 19	CLD	WEL	FJI	NC	0

=== Complete International Formula 3000 results ===
(key) (Races in bold indicate pole position; races in italics indicate fastest lap.)

Year	Entrant	1	2	3	4	5	6	7	8	9	10	DC	Points
1992	3001 International	SIL	PAU	CAT	PER	HOC	NÜR	SPA	ALB	NOG; 16	MAG; Ret	NC	0

=== Complete Indonesian Grand Prix results ===
(key) (Races in bold indicate pole position; races in italics indicate fastest lap)

Year	Car	1	2	Rank	Points
1993	Lola T91/50 Holden	SEN; 7	SEN; 3	4th	16

=== Complete 24 Hours of Le Mans results ===
Year	Team	Co-drivers	Car	Class	Laps	Overall position	Class position
1997	(United Kingdom) Newcastle United Lister	(United Kingdom) Julian Bailey (Brazil) Thomas Erdos	Lister Storm GTL	GT1	77	DNF	DNF

=== Complete Bathurst 12 Hour results ===
Year	Team	Co-drivers	Car	Class	Laps	Overall position	Class position
2017	(Australia) BMW Team SRM	(Germany) Timo Glock (Australia) Russell Ingall (Australia) Tony Longhurst	BMW M6 GT3	Class A – GT3 Pro	134	DNF	DNF

== Bibliography ==
- Skaife, Mark (25 September 2002). Mark Skaife: Diary of a Champion. Pymble, NSW: HarperCollins. ISBN 978-0-7322-7460-3.
- Skaife, Mark; Clarke, Andrew (2 August 2010). Skaifey: Life in the Fast Lane. North Sydney, NSW: Random House Australia. ISBN 978-1-74166-920-6.
- Skaife, Mark (27 October 2020). Mark Skaife: The Complete Illustrated Autobiography. South Melbourne, VIC: Affirm Press. ISBN 978-1-925972-91-7.
- West, Luke (20 August 2021). The Immortals of Australian Motor Racing: The Local Heroes (Part of the 7-volume comprehensive sports collection). Immortals of Australian Sport (7-book series). Gelding Street Press. ISBN 978-1-925946-98-7.

Sporting positions
Preceded by Simon Kane	Winner of the Australian Drivers' Championship; 1991, 1992 and 1993	Succeeded by Paul Stokell
Preceded by Win Percy; Allan Grice	Winner of the Bathurst 1000; 1991 and 1992 (with Jim Richards)	Succeeded by Larry Perkins; Gregg Hansford
Preceded by Jim Richards	Winner of the Australian Touring Car Championship; 1992	Succeeded by Glenn Seton
Preceded by Glenn Seton	Winner of the Australian Touring Car Championship; 1994	Succeeded by John Bowe
Preceded by Craig Lowndes	Winner of the V8Supercar Championship Series; 2000, 2001 and 2002	Succeeded by Marcos Ambrose
Preceded by Garth Tander; Jason Bargwanna	Winner of the Bathurst 1000; 2001 and 2002 (with Tony Longhurst and Jim Richards)	Succeeded by Greg Murphy; Rick Kelly
Preceded by Jason Bright	Winner of the Clipsal 500; 2002–2003	Succeeded by Marcos Ambrose
Preceded by Greg Murphy; Rick Kelly	Winner of the Bathurst 1000; 2005 (with Todd Kelly)	Succeeded by Craig Lowndes; Jamie Whincup
Preceded by Garth Tander; Will Davison	Winner of the Bathurst 1000; 2010 (with Craig Lowndes)	Succeeded by Garth Tander; Nick Percat
Records
Preceded by Peter Brock; 37 wins (1973 – 2004)	Most ATCC round wins 42 (1987 – 2011), 38th win at the 2007 Eastern Creek round of the V8 Supercar Championship	Succeeded by Craig Lowndes; 49 wins (1996 – present)
