= VP (disambiguation) =

VP (vice president) is an officer in government or business below a president in rank.

VP may also refer to:

== Arts and entertainment ==
- VP Records, a Queens, New York reggae record label
- VenetianPrincess (born 1984), pseudonym of internet personality Jodie-Amy Rivera

== Science and technology ==
- Variegate porphyria, an inherited medical disorder
- Vasopressin, a hormone found in most mammals, including humans
- Videophone, a telephone with an electronic visual display
- Virtual Processor, a virtual machine created by Tao Group
- Voges–Proskauer test, in microbiology, a test to detect the molecule acetoin in a bacterial culture
- Virtus.pro, a professional e-sports organisation, based in Moscow, Russia (Dota 2) and Warsaw, Poland (CS:GO)
- 3,3,5-Trimethylcyclohexyl 3-pyridyl methylphosphonate, a nerve agent
- Phase velocity ($v_\mathrm{p}$), the velocity at which the phase of a wave propagates, given a certain frequency
- VP (class) in arithmetic circuit complexity

== Businesses and organizations ==
- VASP (IATA code VP, 1933-2005), Brazilian airline
- Flyme (IATA code VP since 2011), Maldivian airline

== Other uses ==
- Vojvodina's Party (Vojvođanska partija), a political party in Serbia
- Patriotic Party (Turkey) (Turkish: Vatan Partisi), a political party in Turkey
- Christian-Social People's Party (Liechtenstein) (Volkspartei, VP), a political party in Liechtenstein
- Holden VP Commodore, an automobile produced by Australian automaker Holden
- Verb phrase, in linguistics, a structure composed of the predicative elements of a sentence
- vita patris, Latin for "during the life of the father" (e.g. in the expression "died v.p.")
- NCCC Mall VP (formerly Victoria Plaza), a shopping mall located in Davao City, Philippines
- Victoria Park, Melbourne, an Australian rules football ground
- Vigyan Pragati, a magazine
- a patrol squadron of U.S. Navy aircraft
- /vp/, the Pokémon board on 4chan
