= Tao Group (software) =

Defunct UK-based software company

- Type: Limited company
- Industry: Computer software
- Founded: 1992
- Headquarters: Reading, Berkshire, England
- Website: tao-group.com

Tao Group was a software company with headquarters in Reading, Berkshire, UK. It developed the Intent software platform, which enabled content portability by delivering services in a platform-independent format called Virtual Processor (VP). The business's IP portfolio was sold in May 2007 to Cross Atlantic Capital Partners.

== History ==
Francis Charig and Chris Hinsley founded Tao Group in 1992. In the same year, the company released the first generation of its virtual machine, called Virtual Processor (VP). In 1998, Tao Group released the second generation, VP2.

In 2002, Tao acquired SSEYO, a British audio company that specialised in generative music technologies and created the Koan generative music engine. SSEYO won a BAFTAInteractive Entertainment Award in 2001. Tao won a BAFTA Interactive Entertainment Award in 2005 for the miniMIXA product.

Tao licensed more than 20 million copies of Intent to clients, working with companies such as Sony, NEC, JVC, Kyocera, HTC, Philips Electronics, Kodak, Sharp and Panasonic. From 2001 to 2004, the Open Contents Platform Association (chaired by Kyocera President Yasuo Nishiguchi) and Tao CEO Francis Charig looked at networked device standardisation using Intent. More than 50 companies were members, mostly Japanese. Red Herring included Tao in its top 100 European privately held companies in 2005 and 2006. In 2006, Tao was named a World Economic Forum Technology Pioneer and was ranked 26th in the 2006 Tech Track 100 in association with the Sunday Times.

Investors in Tao Group included Motorola, Freescale Semiconductor, Sony, NEC, Sharp, Kyocera, and Mitsubishi. In June 2007 Cross Atlantic Licensing, a wholly owned subsidiary of Cross Atlantic Capital Partners LLC, acquired the business. In mid-2007 Charig founded Antix Labs Ltd, which was headquartered in Reading, England, and employed many who previously worked at Tao. Antix built a software games player that enabled games to be delivered to internet-connected TVs. In 2008, Intermorphic Ltd, a generative tools company established by the founders of SSEYO, acquired the entire intellectual property base of the Intent Sound System (ISS) technology (including Koan and miniMIX) from Cross Atlantic Licensing, and it is now rebranded as the Intermorphic Sound System, part of Intermorphic's "tikl tech" platform. Koan was superseded by Intermorphic's Noatikl music engine (now a component of Wotja), and miniMIXA has been rebranded and further developed into first Mixtikl, and now Wotja.

== Products ==
The company's main product was "Intent", a hardware-independent software platform.

=== Intent ===
TAOS was the original name for Intent. As the product changed it was renamed to Elate and then finally named Intent.

Tao Group's licensed product, "Intent", was a software platform provided to third party hardware and service providers. It enabled games and multimedia entertainment to run on mobiles and other digital devices. It was also used to simplify content management by delivering code in an efficient hardware-independent format.

The Intent platform could be run either as the native operating system or as an application. Service code was delivered in a format called Virtual Processor (VP), which was translated on the device to native machine code.

The Intent portfolio included support for:

- C/C++ games with OpenGL ES 3D rendering
- A Java virtual machine which translated to native code
- A web browser optimised for small screens
- A music and multimedia mixer called miniMIXA
- A MIDI ringtone engine called the Advanced Polyphone Ringtone Engine.
