= VP1 =

VP1 or VP-1 may refer to:

VP1:

- Viral Protein 1, a name used for the largest, most abundant, or first discovered protein component of the capsids of several virus families
  - Major capsid protein VP1, a main component of the polyomavirus capsid
- VP1, a virtual machine architecture conceptually similar to Java

VP-1:

- Evans VP-1 Volksplane, an aircraft designed for amateur construction
- VP-1, an active patrol squadron of the United States Navy, the fifth Navy squadron to be designated VP-1
