= Nishiguchi =

Nishiguchi (written: 西口) is a Japanese surname. Notable people with the surname include:

- Akira Nishiguchi (西口 彰, 1925–1970), Japanese serial killer and fraudster
- Daisuke Nishiguchi (西口 大輔, born 1988), Japanese footballer
- Fumiya Nishiguchi (西口 文也, born 1972), Japanese baseball player
- Ryo Nishiguchi (西口 諒, born 1990), Japanese footballer
- Yasuo Nishiguchi (西口 泰夫, born 1943), Japanese businessman
