= A Year with Swollen Appendices =

Book by Brian Eno

- Author: Brian Eno
- Cover artist: Anton Corbijn (photo)
- Language: English
- Genre: Diary, Essays, Short Stories
- Published: 5 September 1996 Faber and Faber (London)
- Publication place: United Kingdom
- Media type: Print
- Pages: 424 pp
- ISBN: 0-571-17995-9
- OCLC: 34886192
- Dewey Decimal: 780/.92 B 22
- LC Class: ML410.E58 A3 1996

A Year with Swollen Appendices is a book by Brian Eno. The paperback book was published by Faber and Faber in 1996 and is divided into two sections. The first part is a diary covering the year 1995, the second part, the 'swollen appendices' of the title is a collection of essays, short stories and correspondence. It was re-released with a new introduction by Eno in 2021.

== Diary ==
I've never kept a big diary past about 6 January (so I know a lot about the early Januaries of my life), but at the end of 1994 I made a resolution to keep one for 1995. I did it because I wanted to schedule in advance some of the things that Anthea and I don't get round to doing often enough— going to the cinema, the theatre, galleries and so on. The preplanning idea failed within weeks ...

— Brian Eno, Introduction to A Year with Swollen Appendices

The diary covers the year 1995 during which Eno worked on David Bowie's Outside, the Passengers album Original Soundtracks 1 with U2, the albums Spinner with Jah Wobble, and the War Child charity album The Help Album. Eno also collaborated the band James.

In addition, the diary covers Eno's involvement with the non-profit War Child which has helped children affected by the Bosnian War, as well as his correspondence with pen pal Stewart Brand.

The diary covers the period of Eno's life during which he used SSEYO's Koan Pro software to create generative music, work which led to the 1996 publication of his title Generative Music 1 with SSEYO Koan Software. The cover of the diary is shared with this software title.

== Appendices ==
The appendices, which are delineated by pink paper in the original book, cover a number of different topics with some of the writing dating as far back as 1978. The essays cover subjects closely linked with Eno such as ambient music, generative music, music copyright, the role of an artist and art. In addition there is correspondence, interviews and short stories.

== Reception ==
In 2021, The Guardian wrote that A Year with Swollen Appendices is "rightly regarded as one of the seminal books about music ... an invaluable insight into the mind and working practices of one of the industry's undeniable geniuses".

== Cover ==
The cover photograph is by Anton Corbijn.

== See also ==
- More Dark Than Shark (1986)
- I Dormienti (2000)
