= Holden Caprice (VQ) =

Australian full-size luxury car

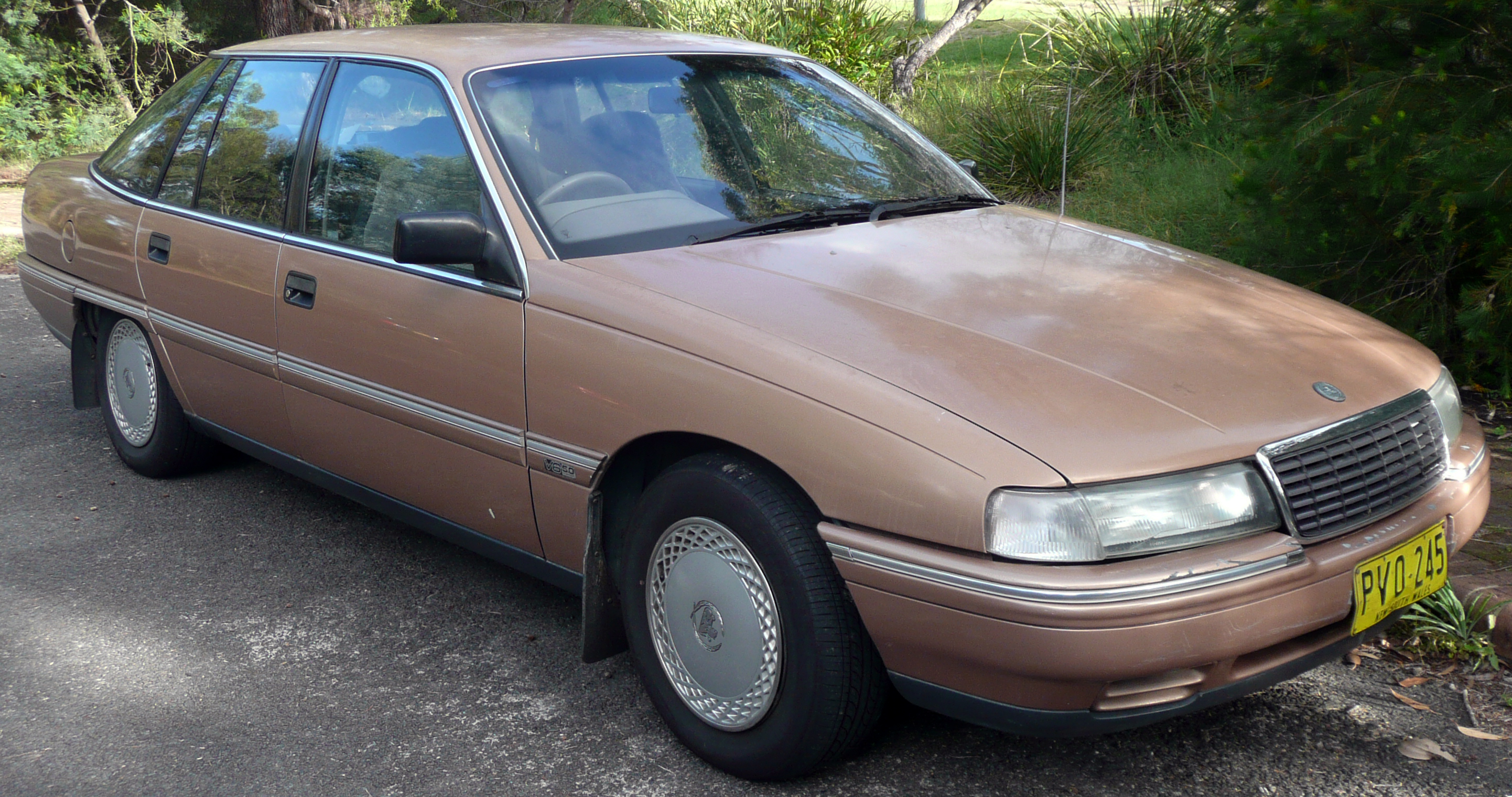

Overview
- Manufacturer: Holden (General Motors)
- Also called: Holden Statesman (VQ)
- Production: 7 March 1990 – March 1994
- Designer: Mike Simcoe (1989)

Body and chassis
- Class: Full-size
- Body style: 4-door sedan
- Layout: FR layout
- Related: Holden VG Ute; Holden VN Commodore; Opel Omega; Opel Senator

Powertrain
- Engine: V6: 3.8 L 127 kW (170 hp): 3800 V6; V8: 5.0 L 165 kW (221 hp): HEC 5000i V8; 5.0 L 180 kW (241 hp): HEC 5000i V8; 5.0 L 200 kW (268 hp): HEC 5000i V8
- Transmission: 4-speed automatic: GM HydraMatic 700

Dimensions
- Wheelbase: V8 Statesman: 2,826 mm (111.3 in)
- Length: V8 Statesman: 4,960 mm (195.3 in)
- Width: V8 Statesman: 1,812 mm (71.3 in)
- Height: V8 Statesman: 1,421 mm (55.9 in)
- Kerb weight: V8 Statesman: 1,563 kg (3,446 lb)

Chronology
- Successor: Holden VR Statesman

The Holden Caprice (VQ) and Holden Statesman (VQ) were Holden's top-of-the-line luxury sedans produced between 1990 and 1994. It was the first Statesman to be based on the Commodore line. The rear end was an all-new design, with independent rear suspension.

They were positioned against Ford Australia's Fairlane and LTD.

The VQ Statesman was used as an official car by government ministers in Australia, and some were also converted into hearses for funerals or limousines.

Series I Statesmans were released in March 1990, whilst the Series II were released in December 1991. There was a further update in late 1993.

== History ==
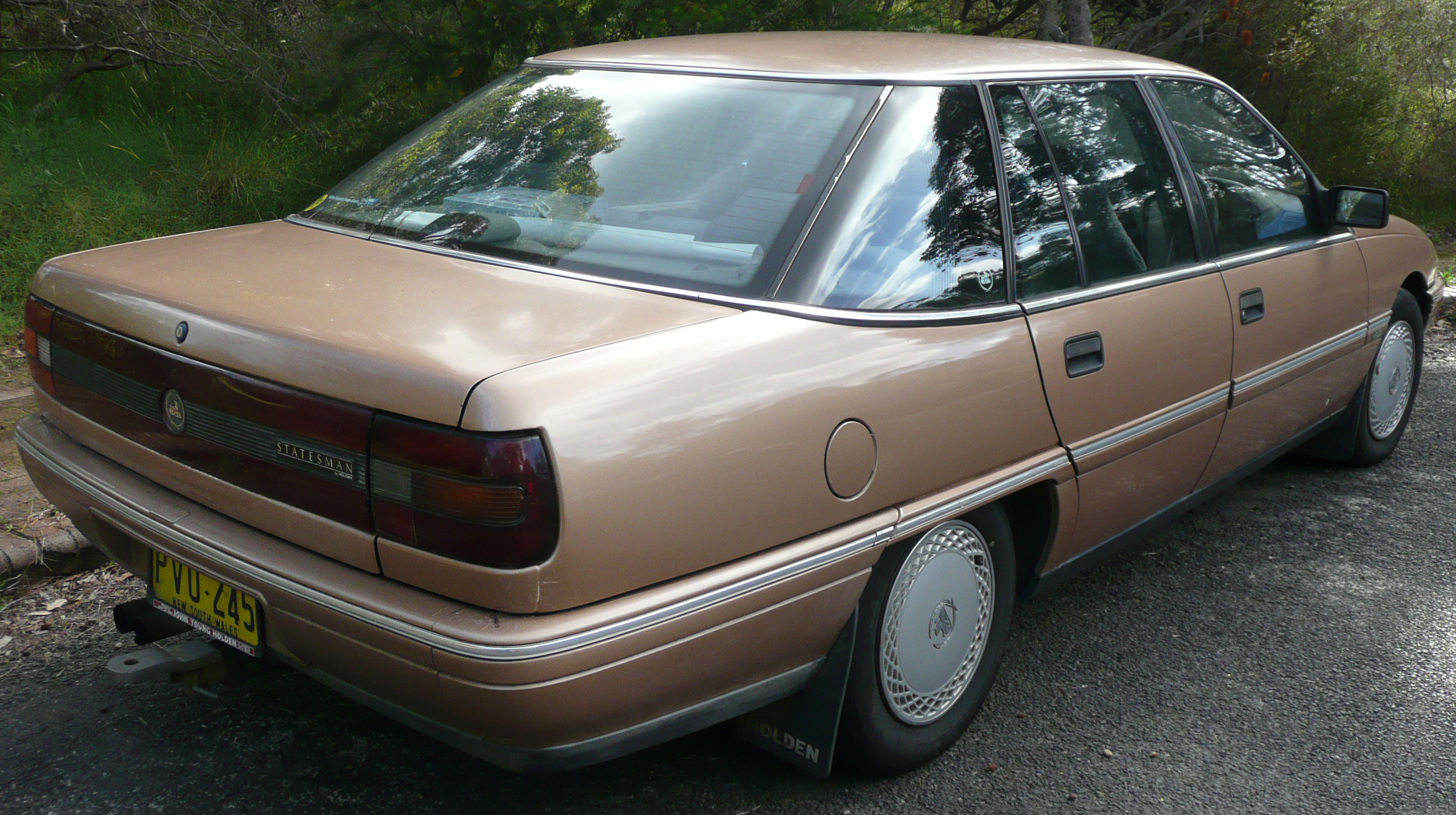
1990–1991 Holden VQ Statesman sedan

After General Motors Holdens ended production of the WB Statesman in 1984, Ford was left to market its Fairlane and LTD with no local competition. It was another six years before Holden released another long wheelbase sedan. Unlike the Ford NA Fairlane, Holden focused mainly on creature comforts and mechanical improvements in the VQ rather than appearance. Holden had plans to work on the appearance further, but it would have pushed the production schedule back a further six months.

Criticisms of the car looking too much like a Commodore in a dinner suit meant that Holden spent a considerable amount of time on the successor, the VR Statesman, re-designing its panels to look unique.

Originally, the car was going to have an analogue clock in place of the current climate control module, however the late 1980s fascination with digital clocks caused them to change their mind and place a digital clock in the roof instead. Holden was not the only manufacturer to do this – others such as Rolls-Royce also did so with the Silver Spirit. The climate control module would have been mounted in the pocket below the stereo headunit if they had gone with the analogue clock.

== Cosmetic changes ==
The Statesman had a number of changes to the bodywork to set it aside from the Commodore. It was based on the longer station wagon wheelbase which made the car physically larger than the Commodore sedan and improved rear legroom. It was also fitted with a modified C-pillar which was covered in glass, giving the appearance of a wrap-around rear windscreen. The pillars were reinforced not only to provide improved strength, but also to give a more solid 'thunk' sound when closing the doors.

Although the exterior lighting remained unchanged from the Commodore, there was a large chrome grille fitted to the front, and a decorative garnish between the rear lights.

== Specification levels ==
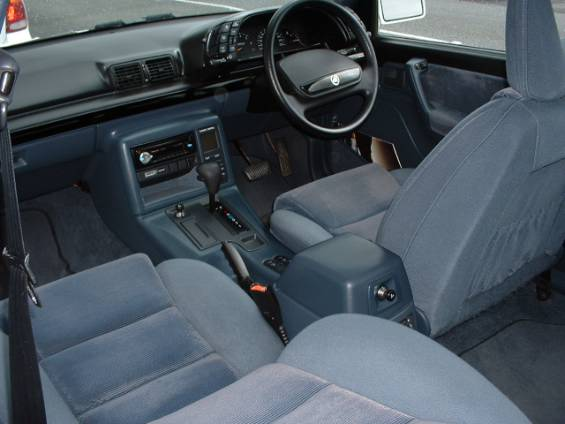
1991–1993 Holden Statesman (VQ II) interior

=== Series I (1990–1991) ===
==== Statesman ====
The VQ Statesman Series I was priced from A$39,950 when new.

VQ Statesman Series I standard features included:

- 15-inch steel wheels
- 5.0 L 165 kW (221 hp) V8
- 4-speed automatic transmission
- 6-speaker stereo
- Alarm which incorporated:
  - Engine immobiliser
- Central locking which incorporated:
  - Keyless entry
  - Remote boot release
- Climate control air conditioning
- Cruise control
- Independent rear suspension
- Power Pack which incorporated:
  - Front and rear power windows
  - Power antenna
  - Power mirrors
- Power Steering
- Trip computer
- Velour interior

VQ Statesman Series I optional features included:

- HSV enhanced 180 kW (241 hp) engine
- Limited-slip differential (LSD)
- Electric Sunroof (dealer fitted)

==== Caprice ====
The VQ Caprice Series I was priced from A$56,894 when new.

VQ Caprice Series I standard features superseded and added to those of the VQ Statesman variant:

- 15-inch alloy wheels
- 14 speaker stereo
- Cosmetic enhancements (e.g. chrome and woodgrain trim)
- Fog lights
- Rear stereo controls
- Rear vanity mirrors

VQ Caprice Series I optional features included:

- Leather upholstery
- Electric sunroof (dealer fitted)

=== Series II (1991–1993) ===
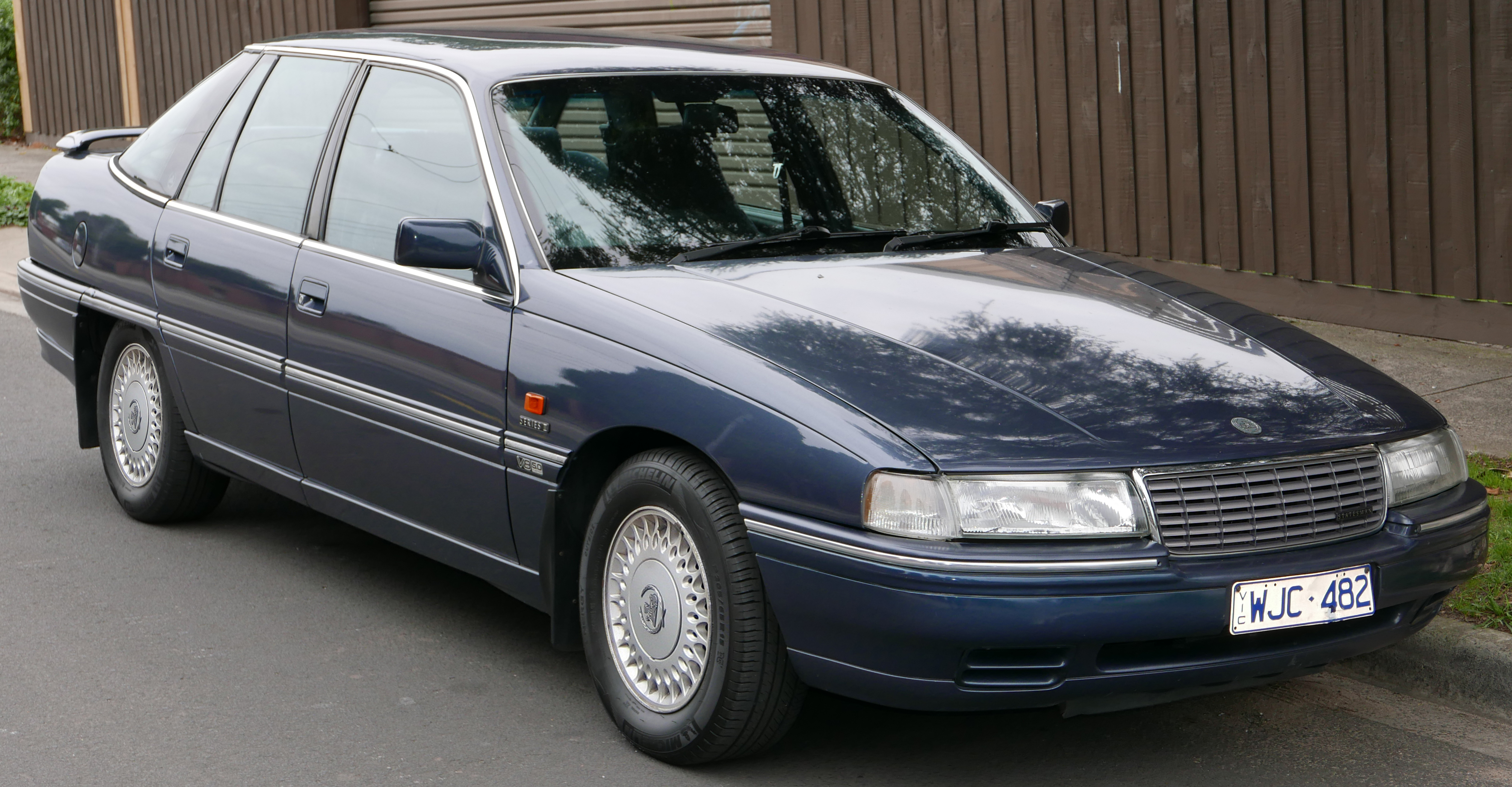

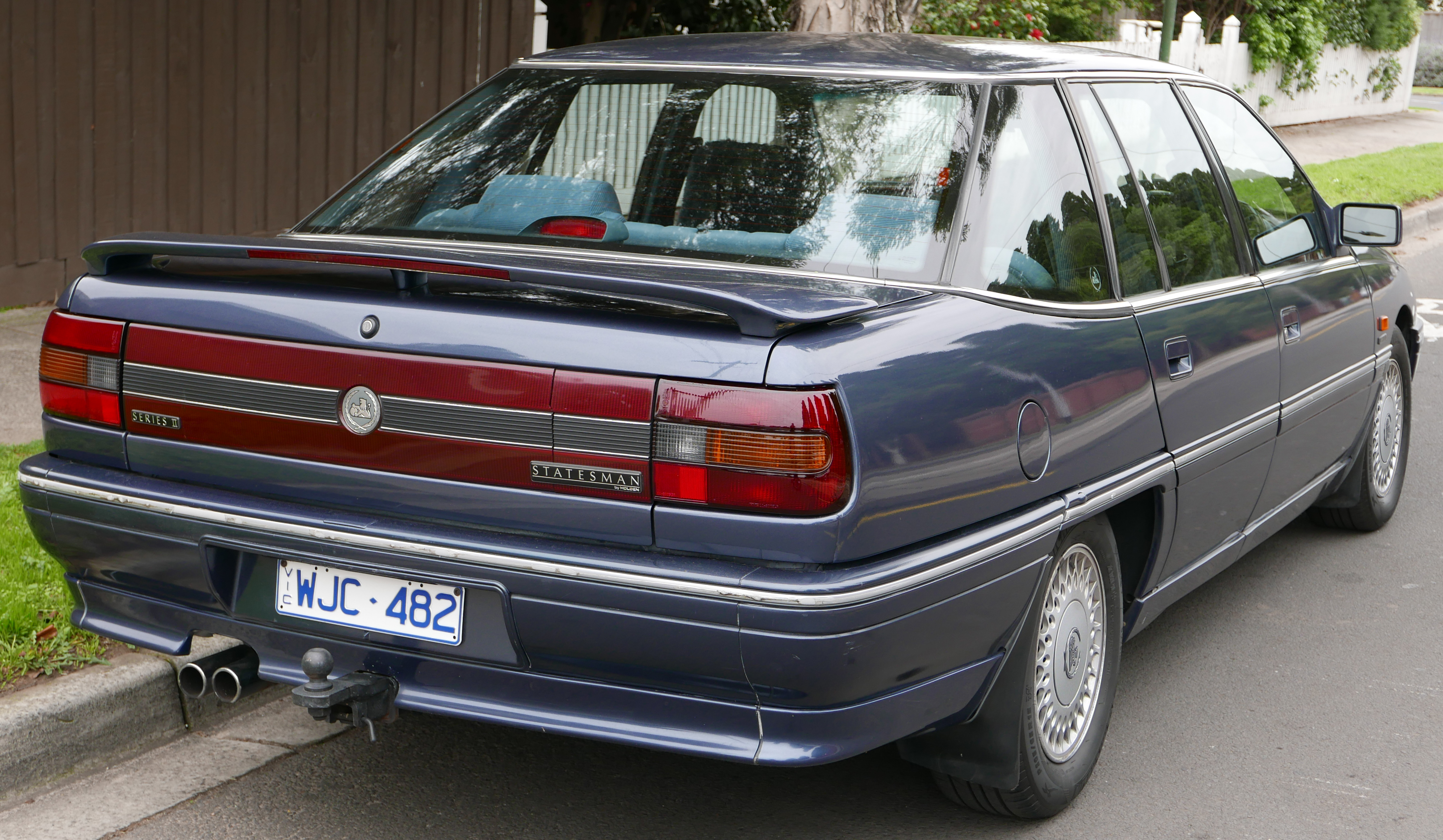
1991–1993 Holden Statesman (VQ II)

The VQ was the second ever Holden to be officially offered as a Series II model after the WB Statesman range in September 1983.

Although the VQ Series I was based on the VN Commodore, the Series II was based on the VP Commodore. This meant that it had a fully revised electrical system consisting of a centralised body control module.

The Series II was fitted with a subtle bodykit and slightly different interior trim. It also had other minor changes such as body coloured side mirrors and indicator repeaters on the front guards.

==== Statesman ====
The VQ Statesman Series II was priced from A$42,863 when new.

VQ Statesman Series II Standard features superseded and added to those of the VQ Statesman Series I variant:

- 15-inch alloy wheels
- Speed sensitive power steering
- Driver's side glovebox

VQ Statesman Series II Optional features superseded and added to those of the VQ Statesman Series I variant:

- Anti-lock brakes
- V6 engine

==== Caprice ====
The VQ Caprice Series II was priced from A$60,352 when new.

VQ Caprice Series II standard features superseded and added to those of the VQ Caprice Series I variant:

- Anti-lock brakes
- Power front seats
- Speed sensitive power steering
- 10 disc CD stacker

== 1993 update ==
There was another final update in late 1993 just before the VQ finished production. It involved minor cosmetic changes such as body coloured grille and a boot spoiler. They were still officially designated as Series II.

== HSV variations ==
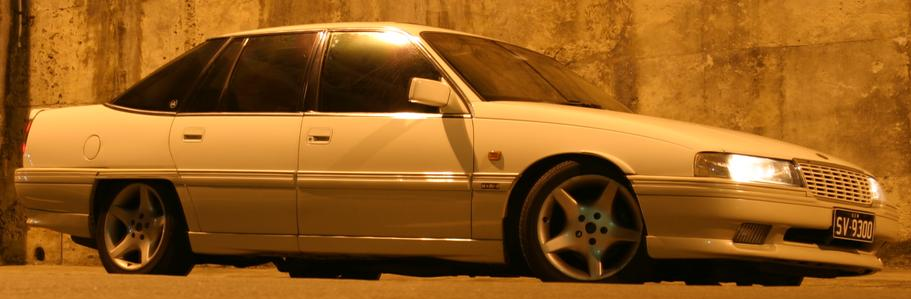
HSV Statesman SV93

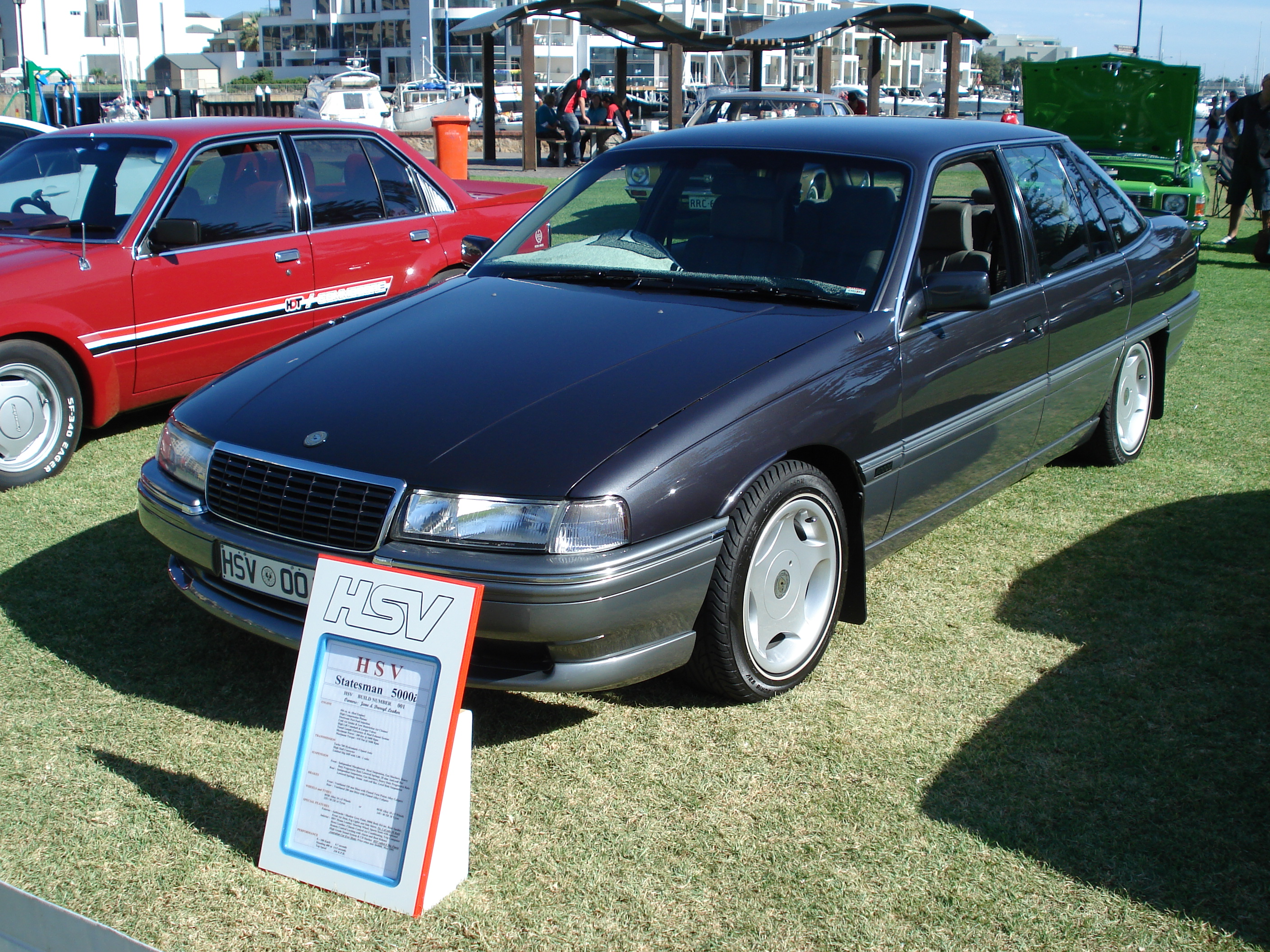
HSV Statesman 5000i

Holden Special Vehicles (HSV) offered several different versions of the VQ Statesman and Caprice, with enhanced performance and appearance. These vehicles were designated as HSV Statesman 5000i, SV90 and SV93. SV90s were available in a maroon colour, SV93s in white over champagne, and 5000i in anthracite. SV90 and SV93 had the HSV enhanced 180 kW (241 hp) engine, whereas 5000i had an even higher output of 200 kW (268 hp).
