= Koan (software) =

Generative music engine

Koan is a generative music engine created by SSEYO, a company founded by Pete Cole and Tim Cole. The Koan technology is now owned by Intermorphic Limited, co-founded by the Cole brothers in 2007.

== Architecture and engine ==
The SSEYO Koan Interactive Audio Platform (SKIAP) consisted of the core Koan generative music engine (the SSEYO Koan Generative Music Engine. or SKME), a set of authoring tools (SSEYO Koan Pro and SSEYO Koan X), a set of stand-alone Koan Music players (SSEYO Koan Plus, SSEYO Koan File Player and SSEYO Koan Album Player), and a plug-in for web browsers such as Internet Explorer and Netscape.

Development of the Koan engine started in 1990, when SSEYO was founded, and by 1992, the first version entered beta testing. Distributed by Koch Media, the first edition of Koan was publicly released in 1994, followed by the Koan Pro authoring tool in 1995.

Later that year, SSEYO brought Koan to the attention of Brian Eno, who quickly showed great interest in the product. He began creating pieces with Koan Pro, collecting and publishing them in his 1996 work "Generative Music 1 with SSEYO Koan Software". This release featured a floppy disk containing the SSEYO Koan Plus player and a set of 12 Koan generative-music pieces that he authored. Eno's early relationship with Koan was captured in his 1996 diary A Year with Swollen Appendices.

Brian Eno, 1996:

Some very basic forms of generative music have existed for a long time, but as marginal curiosities. Wind chimes are an example, but the only compositional control you have over the music they produce is in the original choice of notes that the chimes will sound. Recently, however, out of the union of synthesisers and computers, some much finer tools have evolved. Koan Software is probably the best of these systems, allowing a composer to control not one but one hundred and fifty musical and sonic parameters within which the computer then improvises (as wind improvises the wind chimes).

The works I have made with this system symbolize to me the beginning of a new era of music. Until 100 years ago, every musical event was unique: music was ephemeral and unrepeatable and even classical scoring couldn't guarantee precise duplication. Then came the gramophone record, which captured particular performances and made it possible to hear them identically over and over again.

But now there are three alternatives: live music, recorded music and generative music. Generative music enjoys some of the benefits of both its ancestors. Like live music it is always different. Like recorded music it is free of time-and-place limitations - you can hear it when and where you want.

I really think it is possible that our grandchildren will look at us in wonder and say, "You mean you used to listen to exactly the same thing over and over again?"

Using the pseudonym CSJ Bofop, 1996:

Each of the twelve pieces on Generative Music 1 has a distinctive character. There are, of course, the ambient works ranging from the dark, almost mournful “Densities III” (complete with distant bells), to translucent “Lysis (Tungsten).” These are contrasted with pieces in dramatically different styles, such as Komarek with its hard-edged, angular melodies, reminiscent of Schoenberg's early serial experiments, and “Klee 42,” whose simple polyphony is similar to that of the early Renaissance. But of course, the great beauty of Generative Music is that those pieces will never sound quite that way again.

== Availability ==
The Koan Pro software was available for Microsoft Windows (16- and 32-bit versions), as well as Mac OS 8 and Mac OS 9. Integration with existing digital audio workstations could be difficult, as the software did not include an audio plug-in interface.

Although SKIAP was developed until 2001, the last extension of the SKME itself was in 1998, as SSEYO concentrated on developing technology around the music engine, including real-time music synthesis and a highly programmable web browser plug-in wrapper.

== Browser plugins ==
The SSEYO Koan Plugin for web browsers was programmable in real-time through JavaScript, and was used to create several interesting interactive applications for web browsers. By 2001, Koan included a modular synthesizer; its engine also featured a file format named Vector Audio, which allowed very complicated generative pieces, complete with full synthesizer sound descriptions, to be delivered in only a few thousand bytes of plain text within a Web page. This development led to SSEYO being awarded a BAFTA Interactive Entertainment Award for Technical Innovation in 2001.

== Recent versions ==
SSEYO was eventually acquired by Tao Group, which was sold in 2007. As a result, Koan and the Koan Pro authoring tool are no longer commercially available.

In 2007, the original creators of Koan (Pete Cole and Tim Cole) founded a company called Intermorphic to create a new generative system called Noatikl. They acquired the Koan technology and thence described Noatikl as "the evolution of Koan".

Noatikl supports importing data from earlier Koan systems, and offers a variety of audio plug-in implementations for easy integration with modern digital audio workstations. In 2012, Intermorphic released Noatikl 2, the first major update since 2007, which introduced the Partikl software synthesizer and Mixtikl mixer product. Noatikl 3, released in 2015, added a native iOS app together with extensive improvements to the Partikl software synthesizer.

== Performances ==
In 2003, Ars Electronica held a 96-hour musical event entitled "Dark Symphony", playing live Koan music from various artists over a 160,000-watt PA in Linz's Klangpark on the banks of the Danube.

== See also ==
- A Year with Swollen Appendices – a book by Brian Eno which documents his use of Koan
- BAFTA Interactive Entertainment Awards § Technical Innovation

== General references ==
- "Is the Future of Music Generative?" by Paul Brown
- "Electronic, aesthetic and social factors in Net music" by GOLO FÖLLMER
- Floating Points—Dark Symphony - Ars Electronica 2003
- Computer Generated Music Composition by Chong (John) Yu
- http://www.intermorphic.com/tools/noatikl/generative_music.html - Intermorphic on Generative Music and the early history of Koan
- http://www.intermorphic.com/news/pressReleases/prnoatikl2_Generative_Music_Lab_for_Mac_Windows.html - Noatikl 2 release information
