= Holden Commodore (VP) =

Australian full-size car

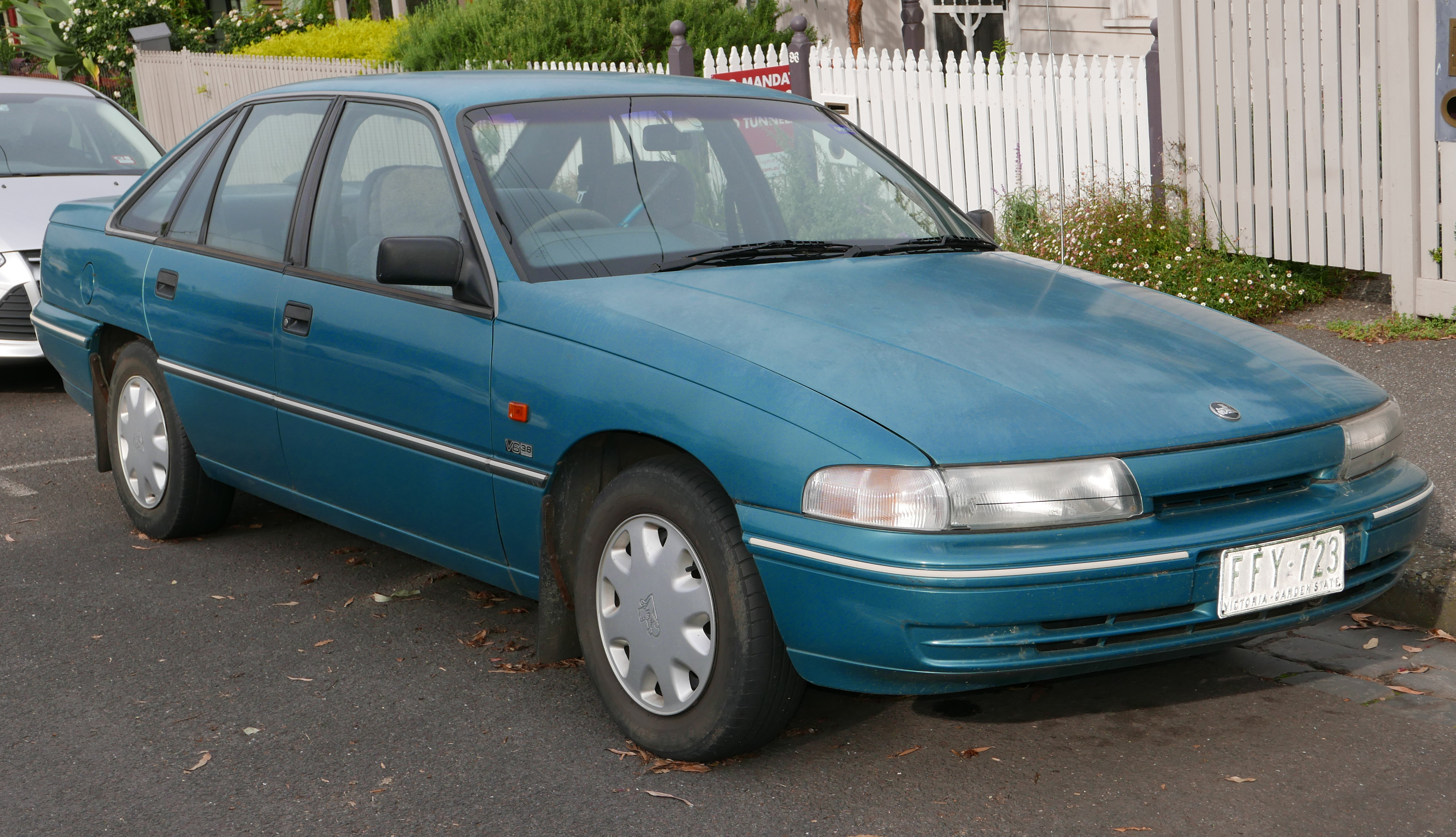
- 1993 Holden Commodore (VP II) Executive sedan

Overview
- Manufacturer: Holden (General Motors)
- Also called: Holden Berlina (VP); Holden Calais (VP); Holden Utility (VP); Holden Ute; Toyota Lexcen (T2)
- Production: September 1991 – July 1993
- Assembly: Australia: Adelaide, South Australia (Elizabeth)

Body and chassis
- Class: Full-size
- Body style: 4-door sedan 4-door station wagon 2-door coupé utility
- Platform: GM V platform
- Related: Holden Statesman/Caprice (VQ); HSV (VP); Opel Omega; Opel Senator

Powertrain
- Engine: 2.6 L C26NE I6 (Export); 3.8 L 127 kW (170 hp): 3800 V6; 5.0 L 165 kW (221 hp) HEC 5000i V8; 5.0 L 180 kW (241 hp) HEC 5000i V8 (HSV enhanced)
- Transmission: 5-speed Borg-Warner T-5 manual 4-speed 4L60 automatic

Dimensions
- Length: 4,891–4,910 mm (192.6–193.3 in)
- Width: 1,812 mm (71.3 in)
- Height: 1,403–1,422 mm (55.2–56.0 in)
- Kerb weight: 1,332 kg (2,937 lb)

Chronology
- Predecessor: Holden Commodore (VN)
- Successor: Holden Commodore (VR)

The Holden Commodore (VP) is a full-size car that was produced by Holden from 1991 to 1993. It was the second iteration of the second generation of the Commodore. Its range included the luxury variants, Holden Berlina (VP) and Holden Calais (VP).

== Overview ==
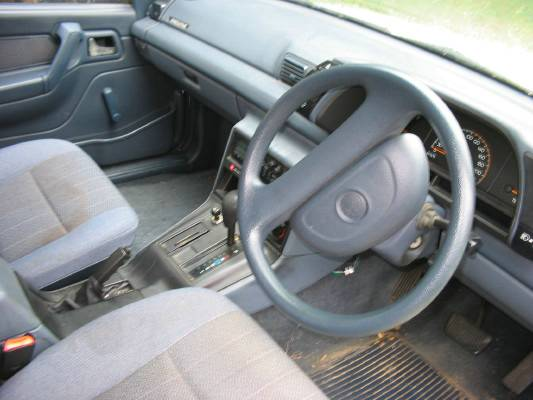
Interior

The VP series was released in September 1991 with mainly cosmetic and feature changes to the outgoing VN Series Commodore. It launched shortly after the Ford EB Falcon. The 3.8 litre V6 and 5.0 litre V8 engines from the VN were carried over, but the V6 engine received various revisions that improved its refinement and noise characteristics as well as boosting power by two kilowatts. The 2.0 litre straight-4 engine which had been offered on the VN in certain export markets was discontinued. Semi-trailing arm IRS became standard on Calais and Commodore SS models and became an optional extra on lower-end models. This new suspension drastically improving ride and handling over that offered by the live rear axle. ABS brakes were also introduced in the VP range as an option on Series 1 Calais and Commodore SS models, and on most models with IRS for Series II versions which launched in January 1993. Additional security features were introduced across the range, including an ignition-disabling device and a driver's door deadlock. Central locking and power mirrors were also a standard feature across the model range. The VP series was replaced in July 1993 by the VR Series Commodore.

The VP Calais was also sold in Thailand, with 3.8 V6 version, later it used an Opel 2.6-litre C26NE inline-six Dual Ram engine.

== Models ==
=== Commodore Executive ===
The Commodore Executive was the base model of the range.

=== Commodore S ===
The Commodore S was the cheapest sports variant of the range. It was essentially similar to the Executive, but with sports trim similar to the SS model.

=== Commodore SS ===
The Commodore SS was the top-of-the-line sports model of the range with a V8 engine.

=== Commodore Berlina ===
The Commodore Berlina was the cheapest luxury variant of the range.

=== Commodore Berlina LX ===
The Commodore Berlina LX was the semi-luxury version of the range. This model was essentially a stepping stone between the Berlina and Calais. The VP was the only version to offer this trim level.

=== Calais ===
The Calais was the luxury version of the range. It was however not badged or marketed as a Commodore.

=== Gallery ===
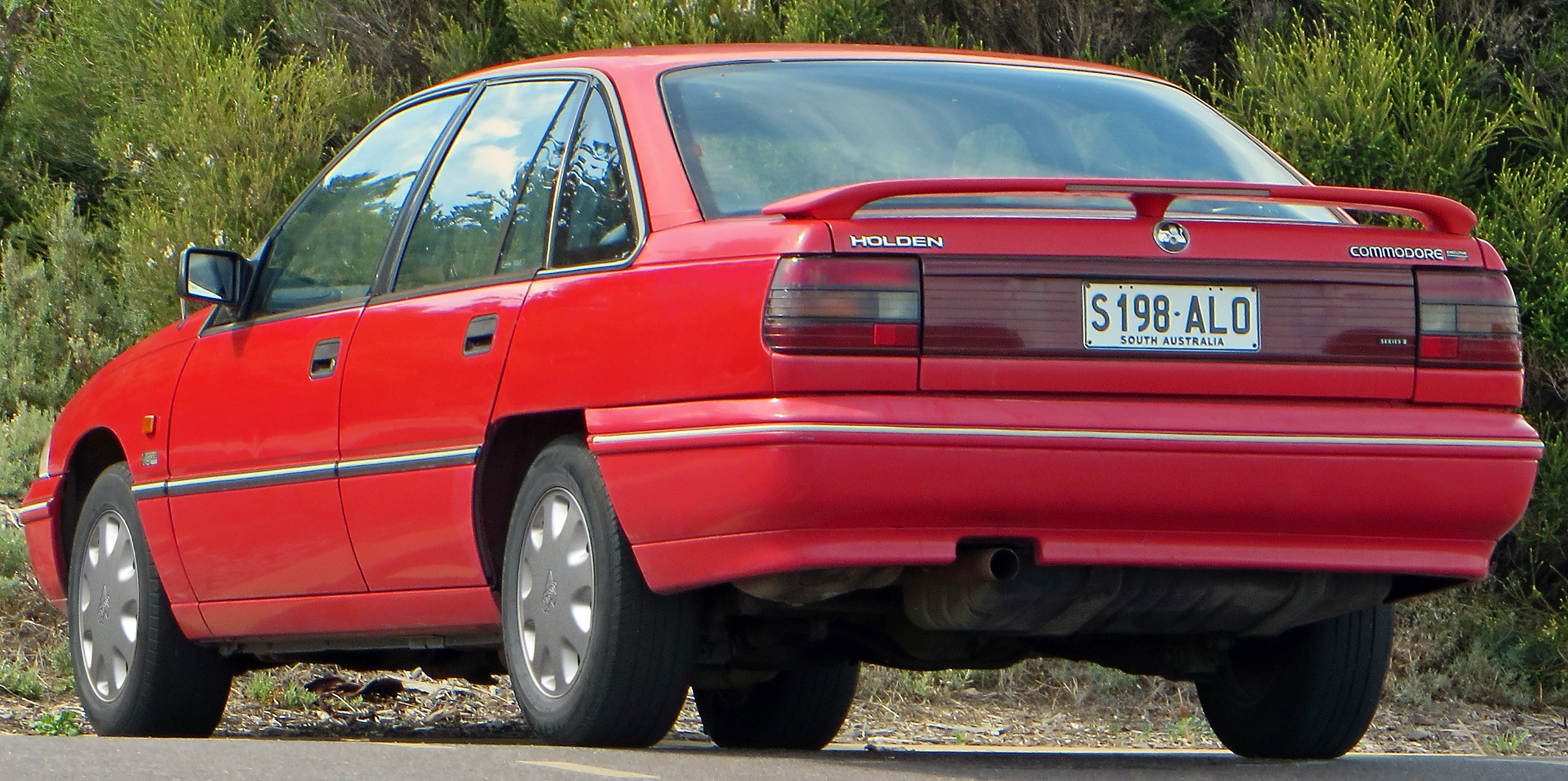
VP II Executive sedan

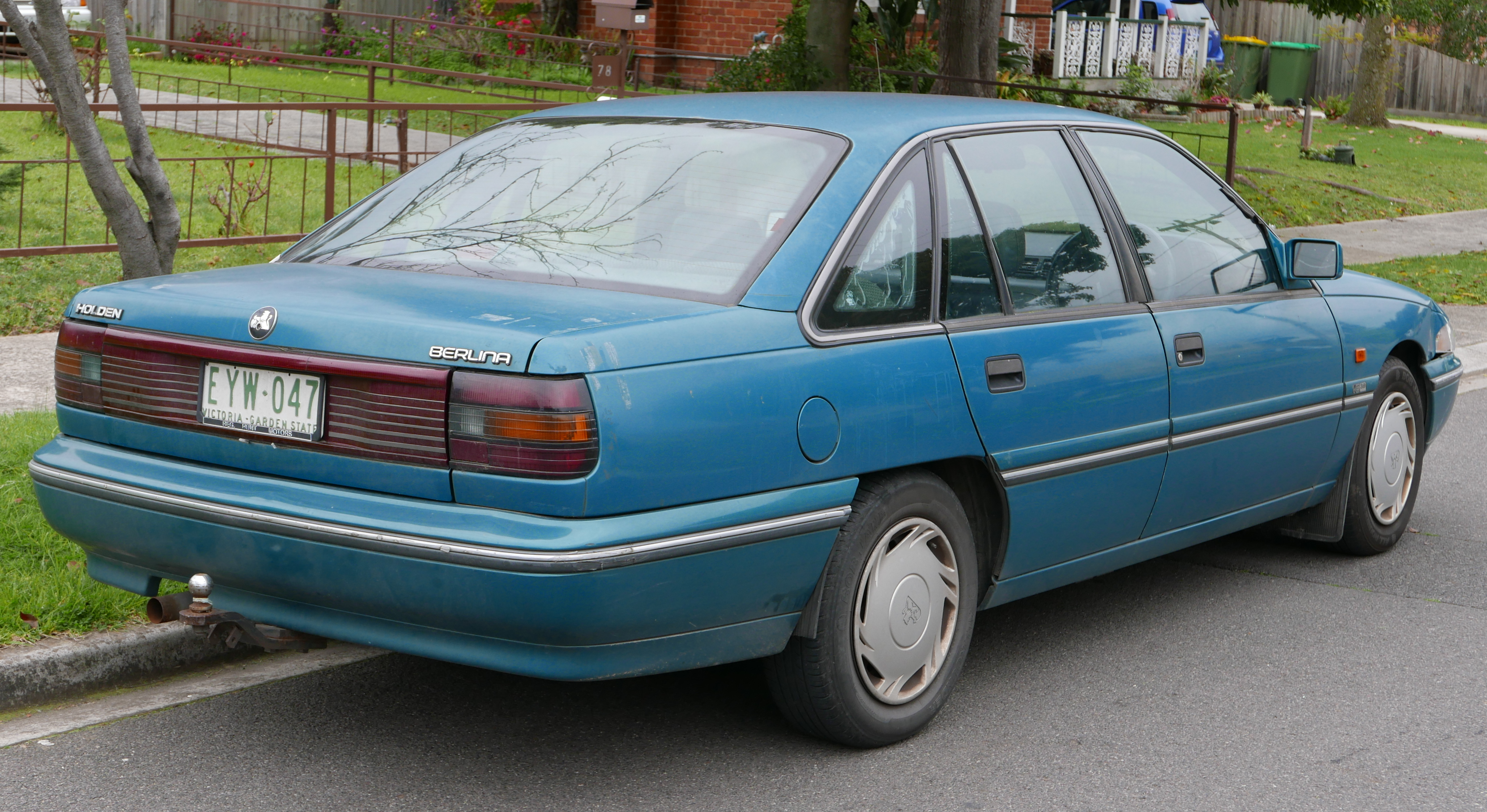
VP Berlina sedan

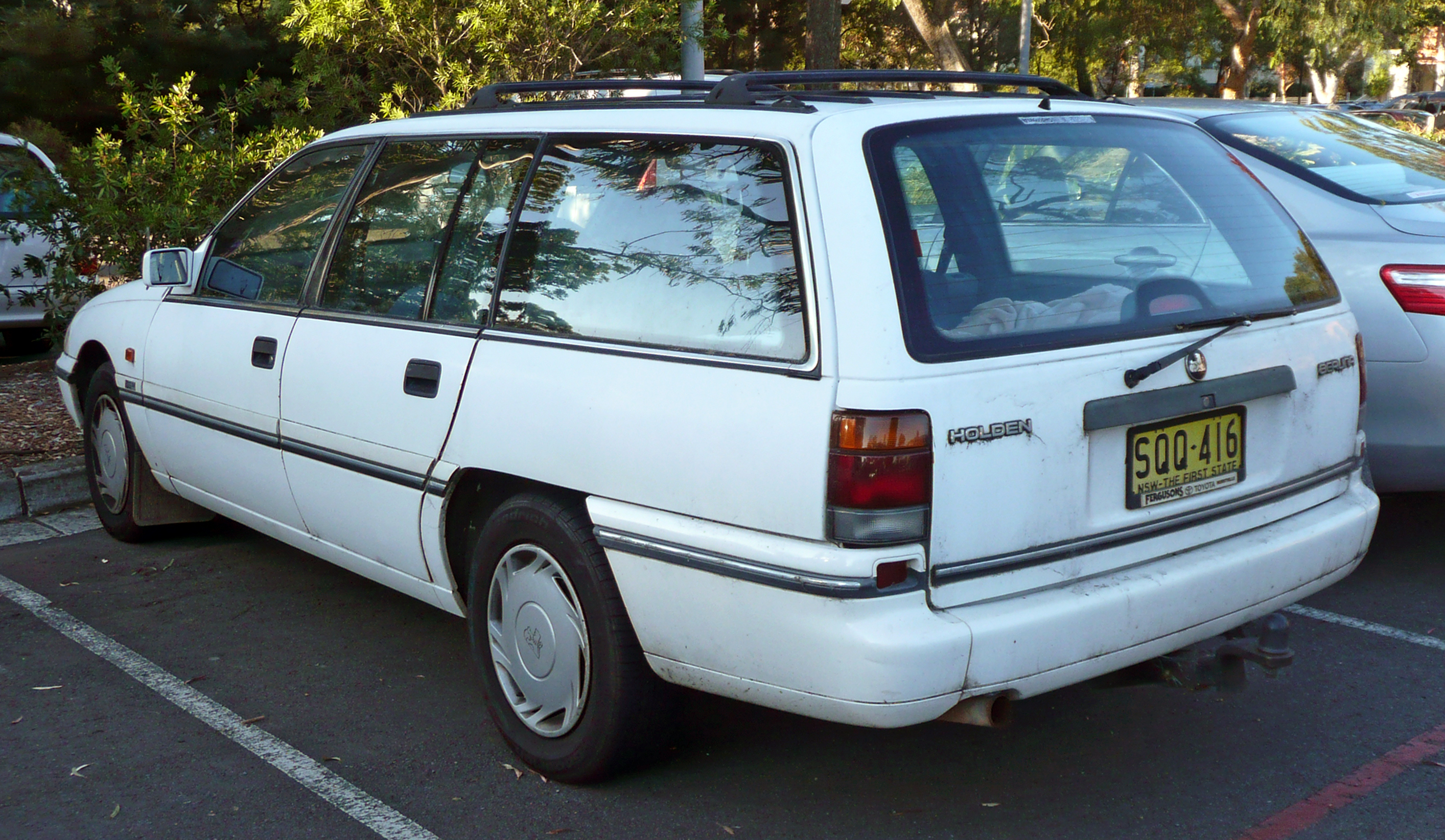
VP II Berlina station wagon

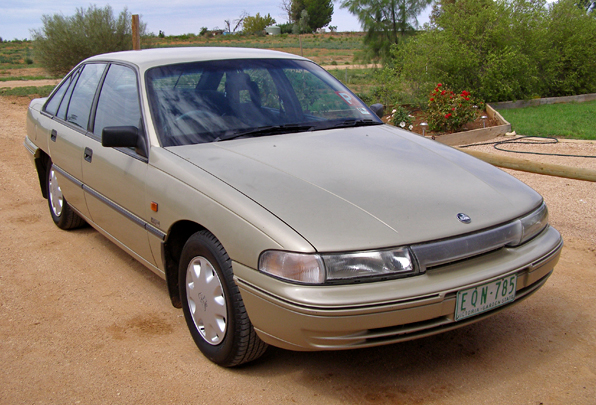
VP Executive sedan

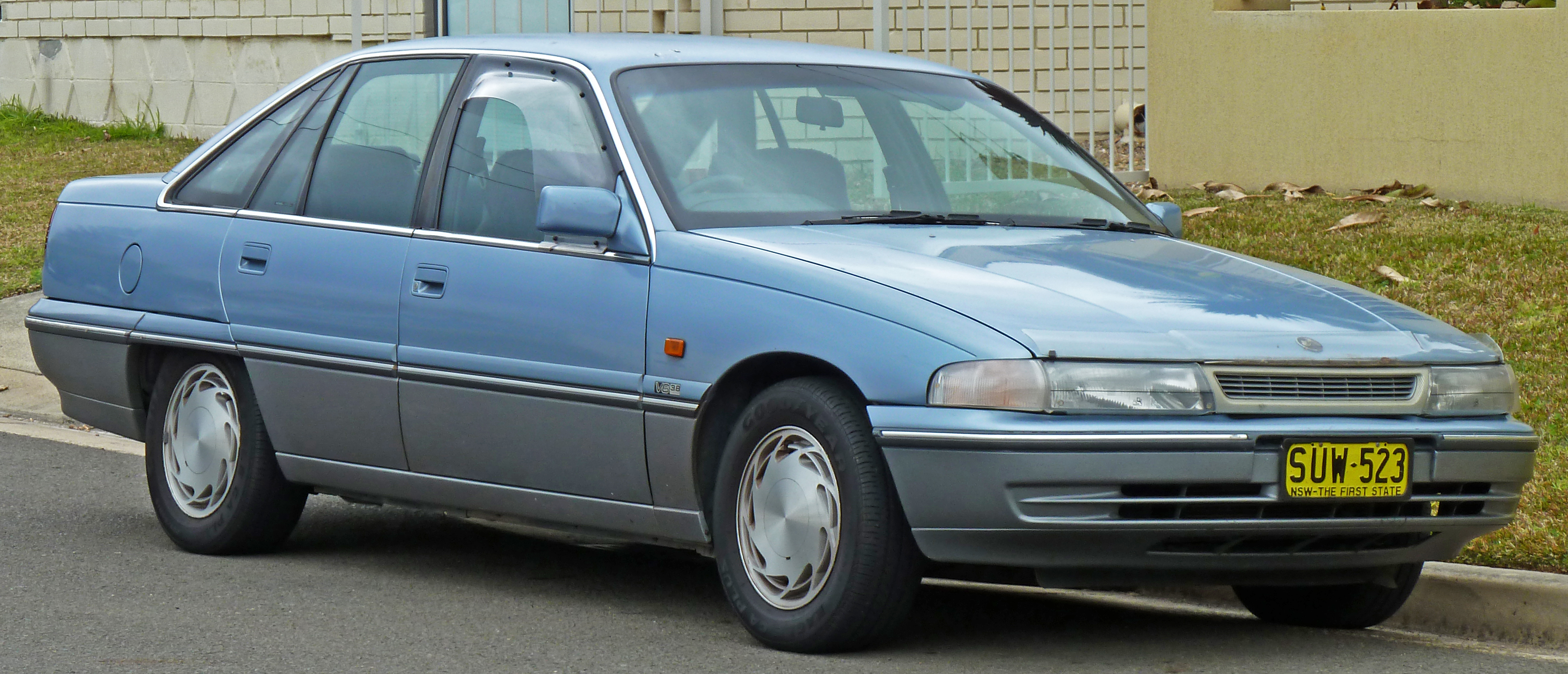
VP II Calais sedan

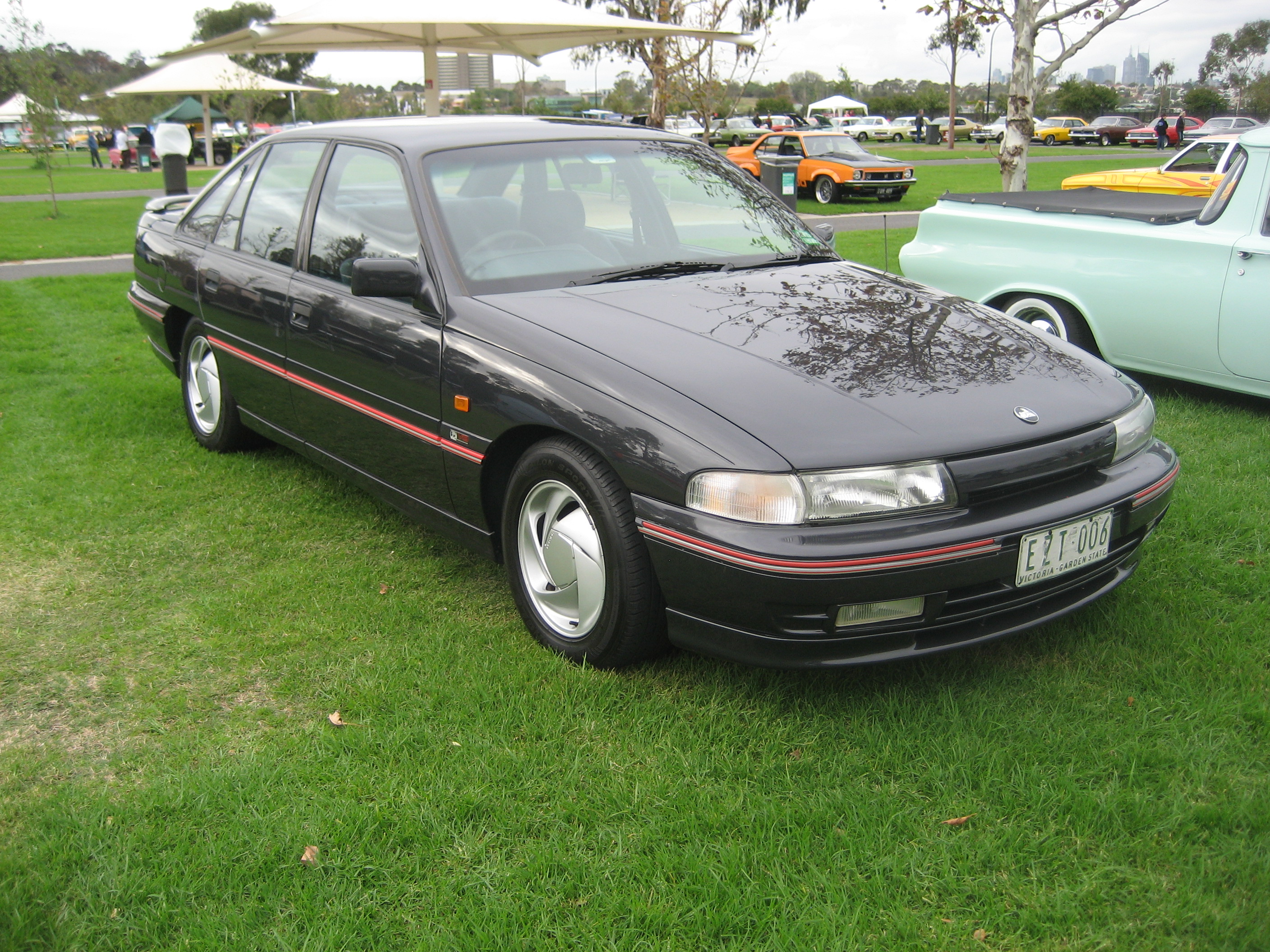
VP Commodore SS

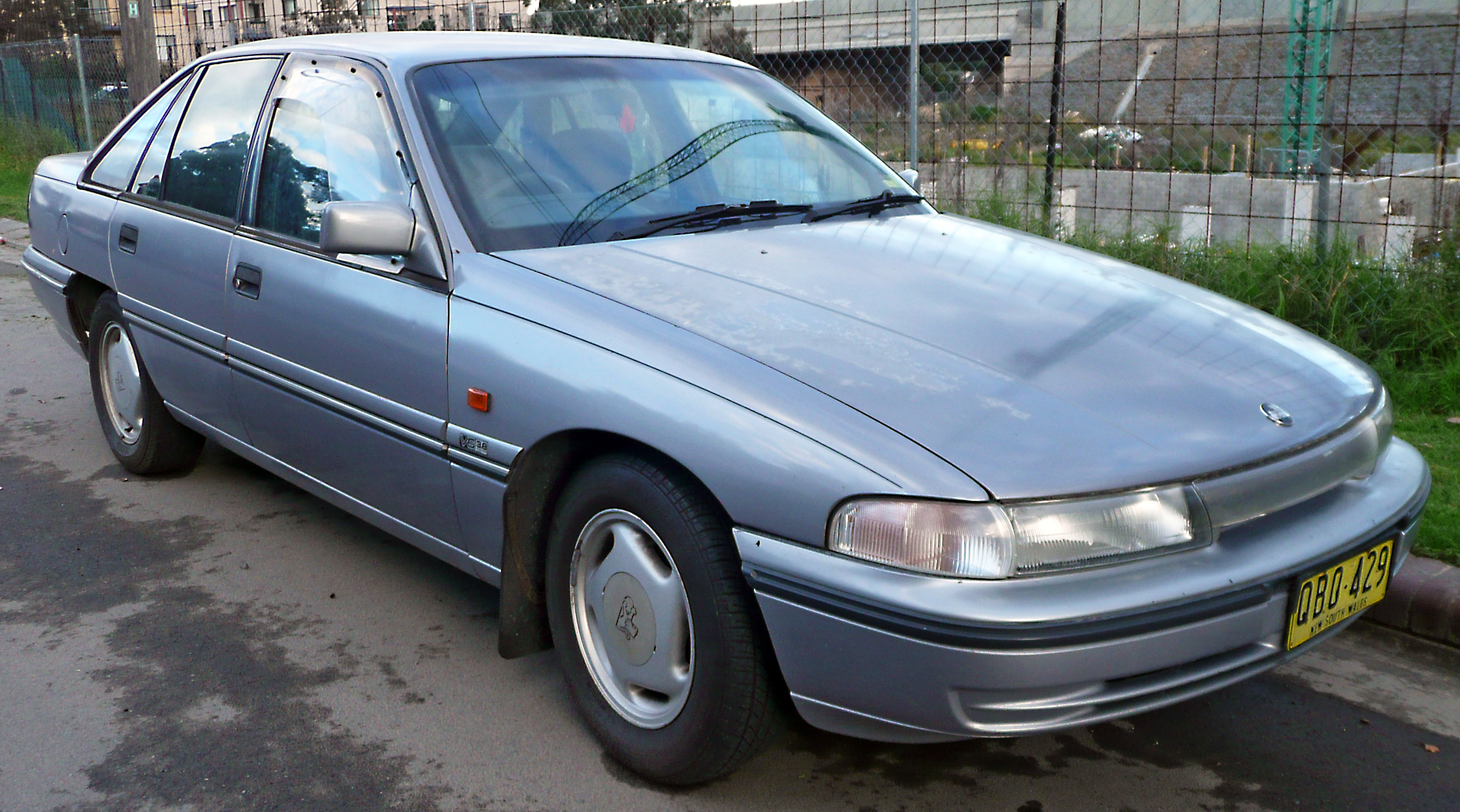
VP Berlina LX

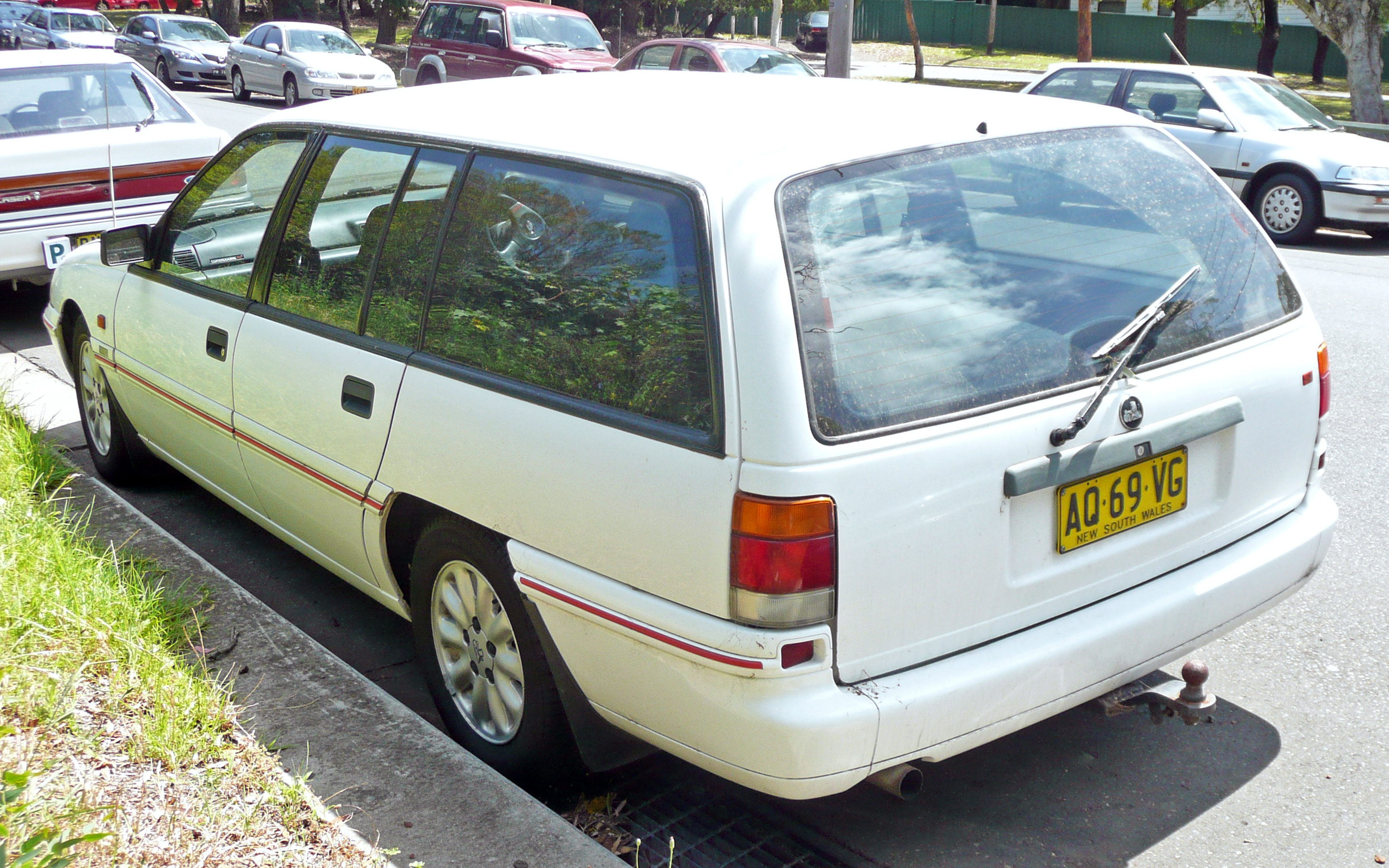
VP Commodore S

== Limited edition and other specification levels ==
=== Commodore SS V6 ===
The SS V6 was a 1992 limited production model which had all the features of the regular Commodore SS but utilized the 3.8L V6 engine in place of the 5.0L V8. It was produced to homologate a suitable model for the Group 3E Series Production Cars motor racing category, which required a small minimum run of cars to be built. The SS V6's main rival was the Ford EB2 Falcon XR6.

=== Commodore BT1 ===
The Commodore BT1, or the Police Pack was a special pack for the VP Commodore that was available to the Australian and New Zealand Police Forces. It was based on the Commodore Executive and added various upgrades to cater to the needs of the Police Force. Many believe that BT1 Commodores had a "cop chip" which increased the engine power output, however this is a myth, as the engine power is the same as in regular VP Commodores. BT1 with IRS had a standard size fuel tank, not a long range tank as found on other models.

Although the pack varied in each state, they were commonly fitted with:

- FE2 sports suspension
- Oil sump protector
- Always-on top lighted speedo (inside the cluster in front of the speedo for "headlights off" speed checks when following speedsters) with 2 km increments (as per Berlina/Calais)
- Dome light and map light interior lighting
- 15 × 6-inch steel wheels
- Transmission Cooler
- Country pack suspension (V5W) in lieu of FE2 in some rural areas
- Vinyl floor mats
- Limited-slip differential
- Modified shift gate to allow gear change from overdrive to second gear without engaging lever. (Standard models only allow shift from overdrive to drive position).

=== Commodore Vacationer ===
The Commodore Vacationer was a limited-edition model based on the Commodore Executive. It was released in October 1992.

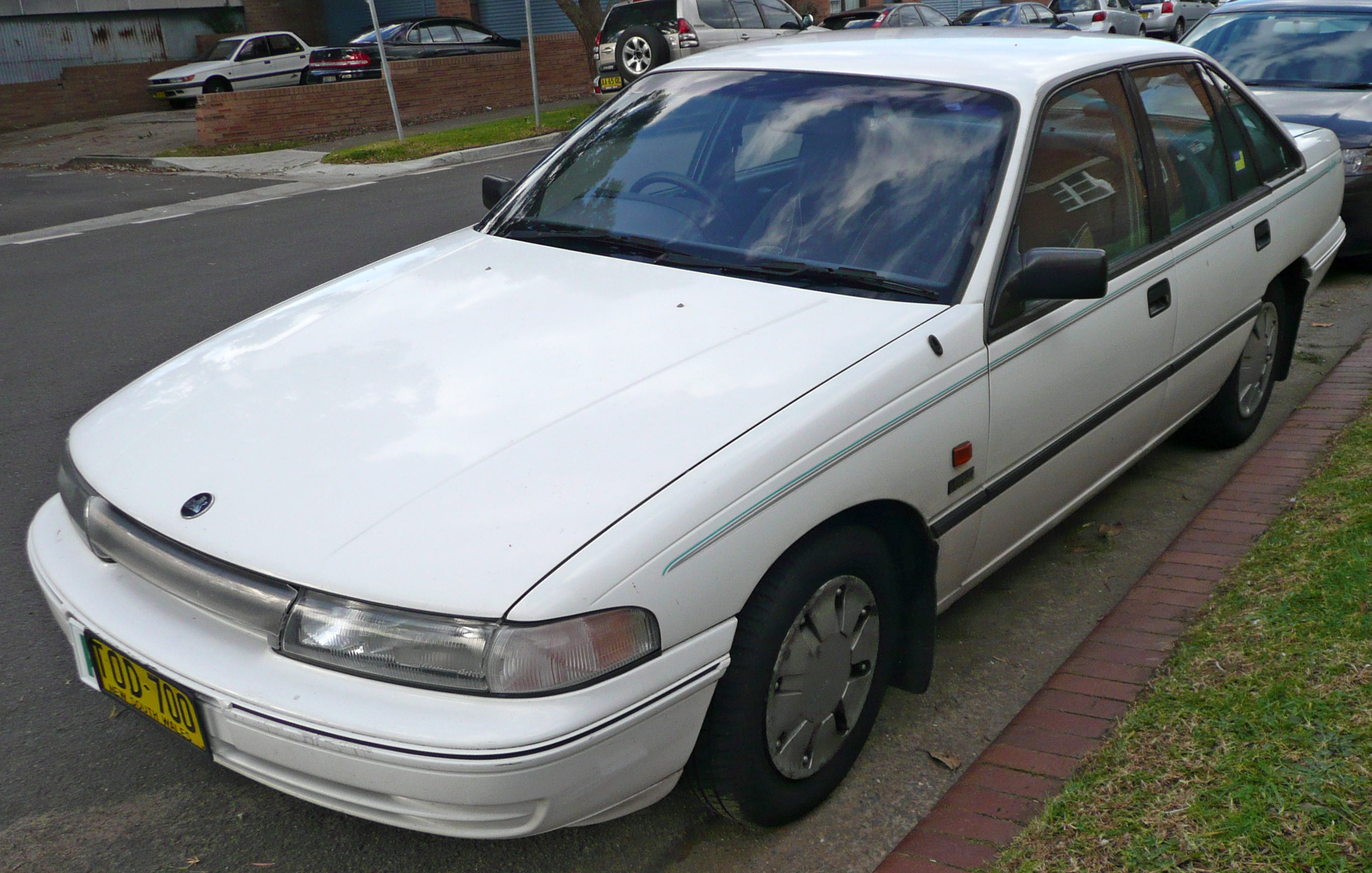
VP Vacationer sedan

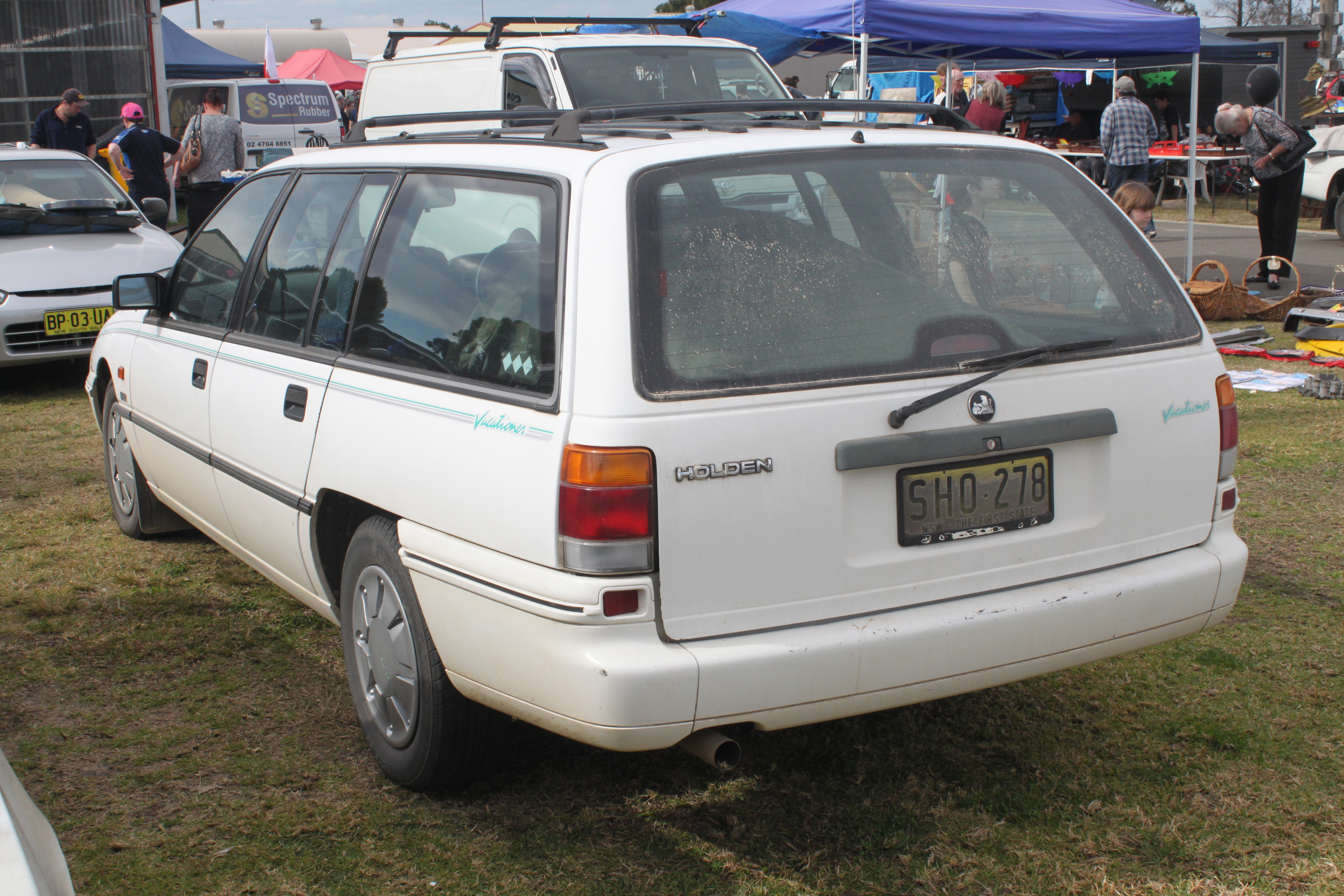
VP Vacationer station wagon

=== Calais International ===
The Calais International was a limited-edition model based on the VP Calais and released in September 1992. A total of 300 were built, 150 in Alaskan White and the same number in Anthracite Grey. All were equipped with the V8 engine and automatic transmission and the exterior featured Commodore SS lower kit (with fog lights) and a Holden VQ Caprice bootlip as well as unique International badges. The paint was single colour, unlike the standard Calais which had a grey lower half. Standard wheels were the 15in alloys from the VQ Statesman but with Holden logos in the centre cap and the interior was black over tan, with tan partial leather/suede seats, and special leather SS style steering wheel.

== Toyota Lexcen (T2) ==
A badge engineered variant of the Holden VP was marketed as the Toyota Lexcen. The T2 series Lexcen was available in CSi, VXi, and Newport trim levels, with a choice of sedan and wagon body styles. It was offered only with the 3.8 litre V6 engine and the four speed automatic transmission.

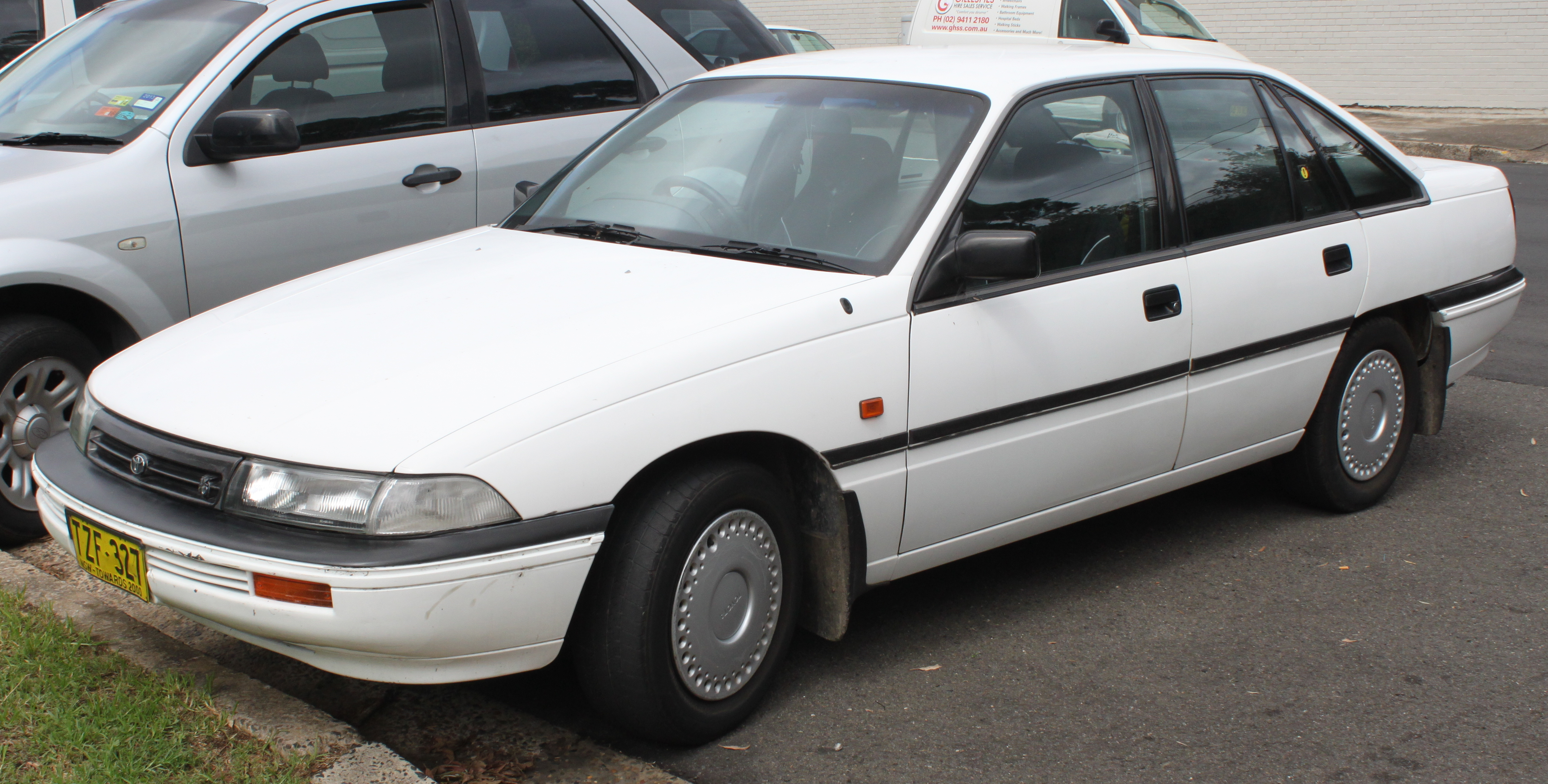
Toyota Lexcen (T2) CSi sedan

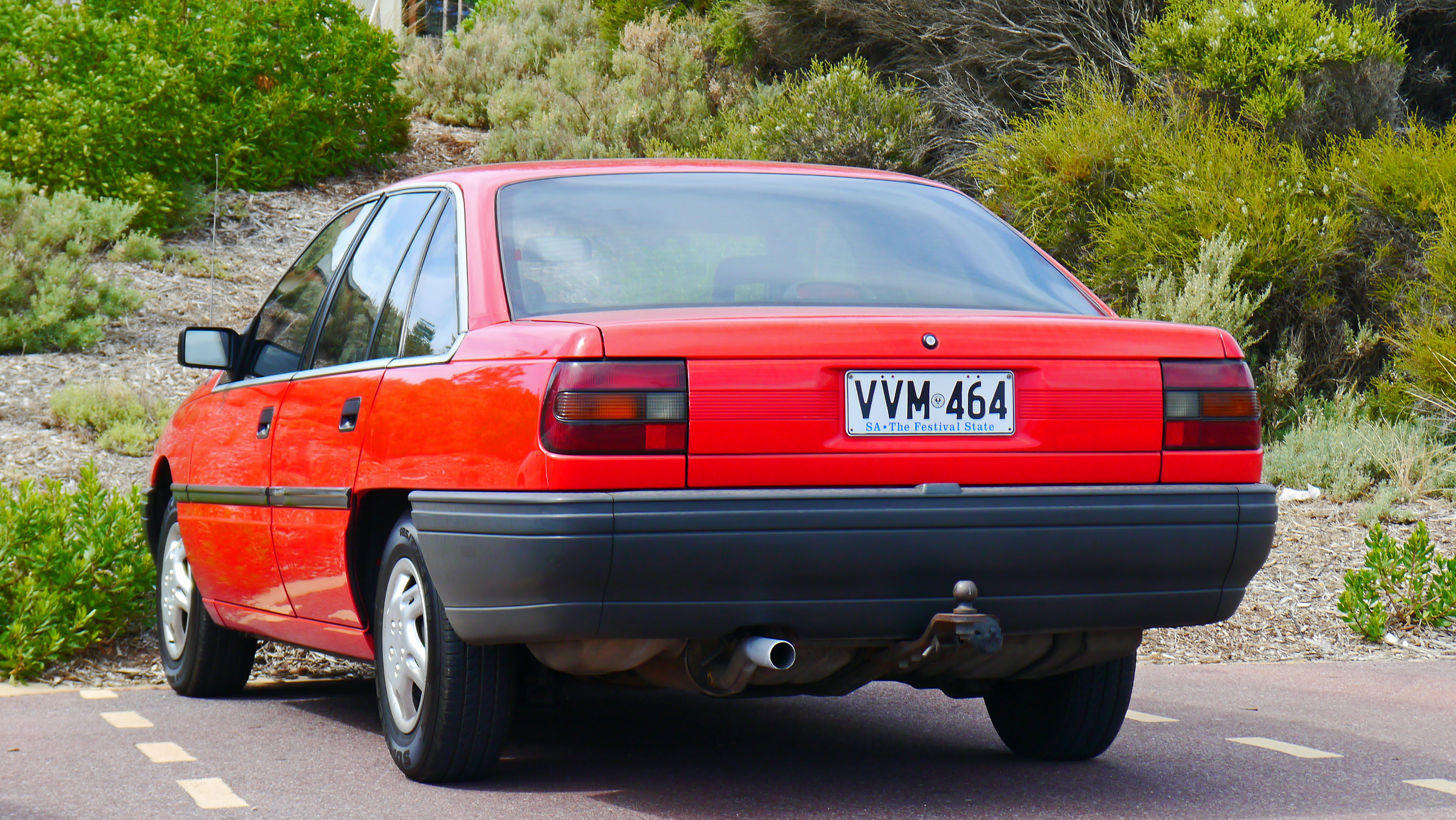
Toyota Lexcen (T1) sedan

== Ute ==
A utility variant of the VP Commodore was launched in February 1992. It was marketed as the Holden Utility (or Holden Ute) and was not badged as a Commodore. No Toyota equivalent was ever produced.

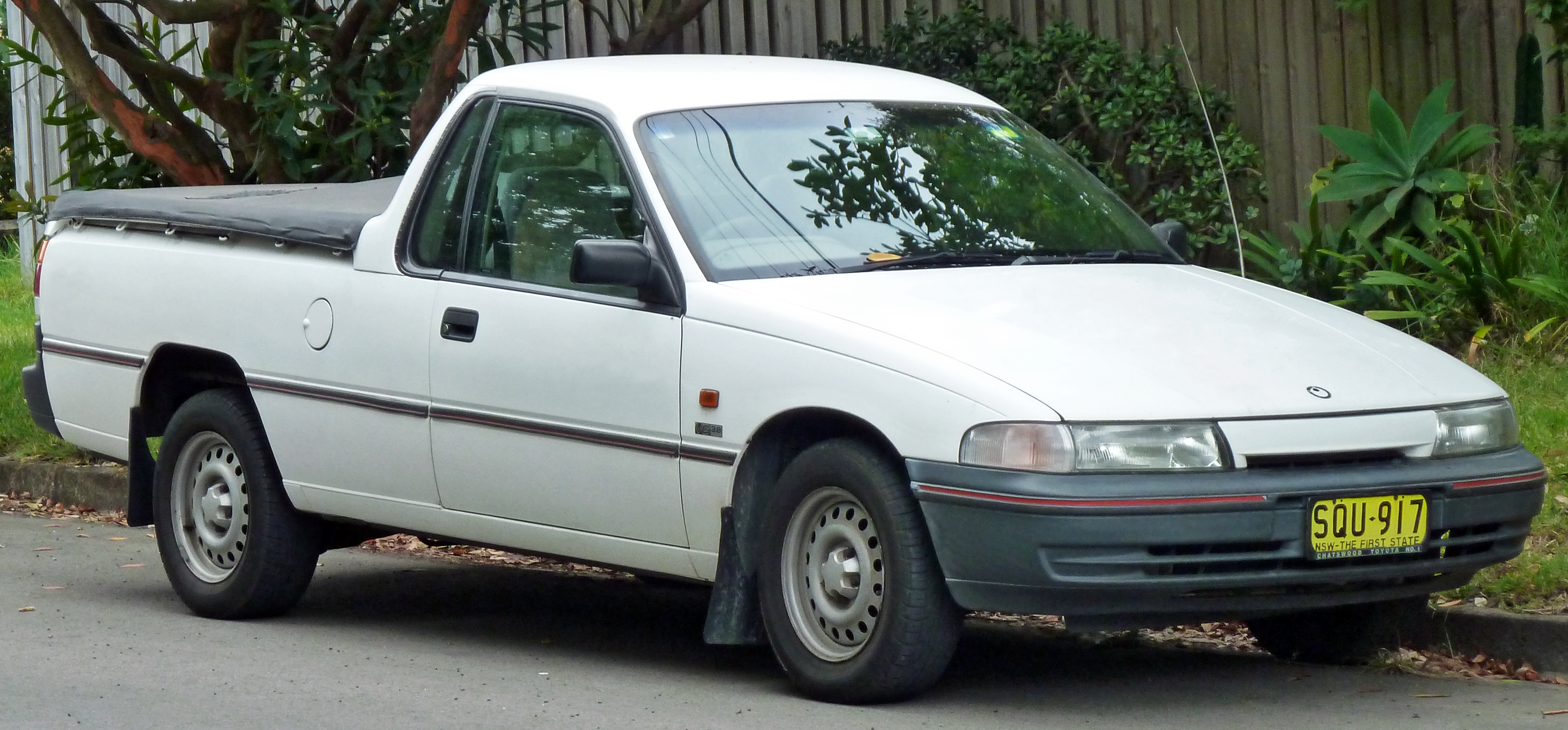
VP II Ute

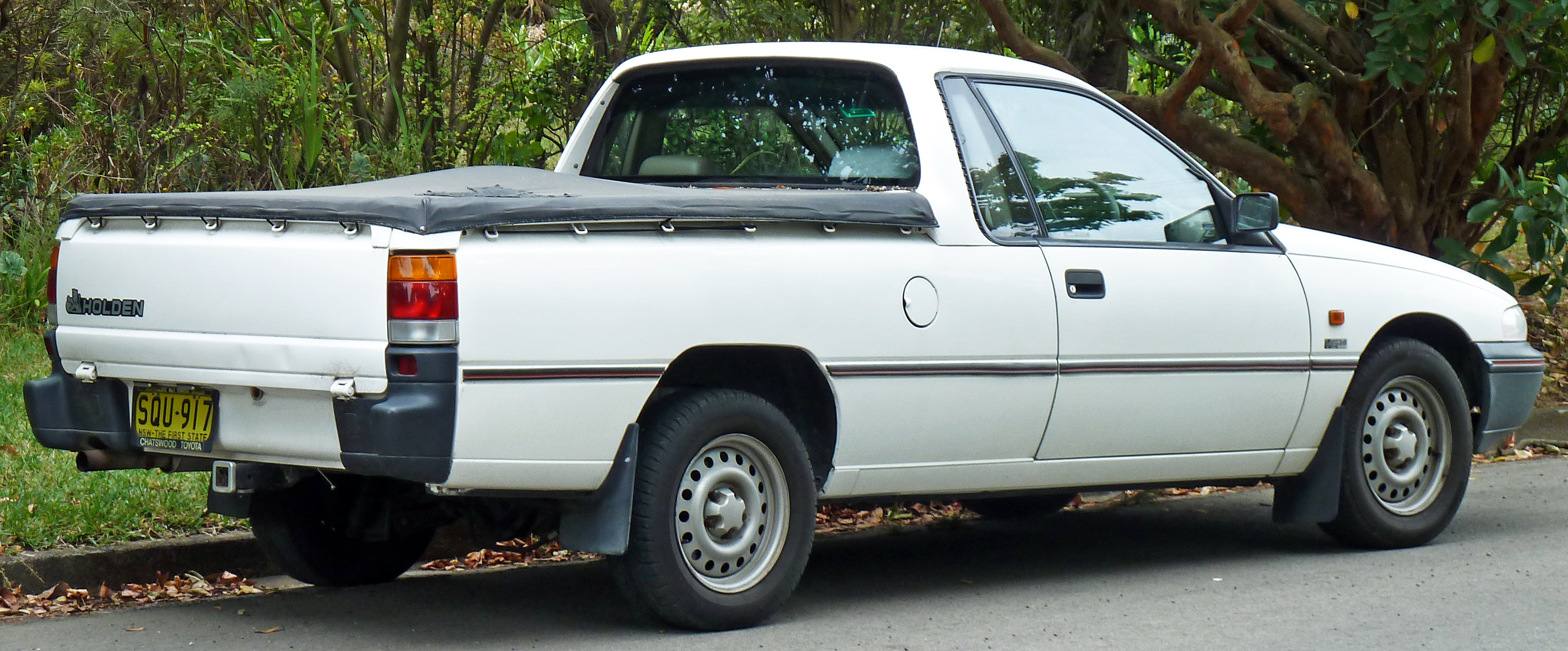
VP II Ute

== HSV range ==
The enhanced performance VP range sold by Holden Special Vehicles (HSV) comprised the variants listed below (including VQ II):

- LS Utility (VG and VP) — 54 built, September 1991 – June 1993
- Club Sport — 387 built, October 1991 – June 1993
- 5th Anniversary Club Sport — 65 built
- Sport Wagon — 43 built, October 1991 – June 1993
- 5th Anniversary Sport Wagon — 5 built
- SV91 — 103 built, October 1991 – June 1992
- + Six 1992 — 82 built, February 1992 – June 1992
- + Six 1993 — 58 built, March 1993
- Maloo — 34 built, March 1992 – April 1993
- 5th Anniversary Maloo — 15 built
- Senator — 201 built, April 1992 – August 1993
- 5th Anniversary Senator — 15 built, March 1993 – May 1993
- Senator 5000i — 136 built, June 1992 – September 1993
- 5th Anniversary Senator 5000i — 30 built, June 1993 – August 1993
- Nitron — 50 built, July 1992 – August 1992
- GTS — 130 built, September 1992 – December 1992
- SV93 Statesman — 46 built, September 1992 – March 1993
- Formula — 67 built, May 1993 – June 1993 (different from the "Formula" body kit offered by Holden)
- Club Sport 5000i — 50 built, May 1993 – June 1993
- Statesman (VQ II) — 84 built, April 1992 – April 1993
- 5th Anniversary Statesman (VQ II) — 8 built, June 1993 – September 1993

=== Clubsport ===
The VP series HSV Clubsport was launched in 1991 with the same 180 kW (245 PS; 241 hp) V8 used in the VN Clubsport. A special edition was launched for both the Senator and Clubsport called the 5000i.

=== GTS ===
The VP GTS program was rushed into production to compete with the ford EB GT in September 1992. Essentially a parts bin special from the VN GRP A model, Like motor, brakes, spoiler kit. Being very popular at the time HSV continued with the GTS label, as HSV's top of the range performance model, with some 130 produced in total. As in the case of the VN series, a V6 version was sold exclusively in New Zealand.

=== Maloo ===
The VP series Maloo utility was released in March 1992. Only 49 examples were made in the thirteen months of production, of which 15 were special HSV Fifth Anniversary Edition models, and the final eight were All-Black limited editions. These exclusive build quantities confirm the VP series to be the least production numbers Maloo ute of all.

=== Senator ===
The VP Senator 5000i was introduced in June 1992, effectively replacing the VP SV 91 as HSV's most luxurious well-appointed model, and is equivalent of the VN SV 5000 model. Exclusive colours called Senator Quartz either soft purple or Dark grey metallic are only available on Senator 5000i model. Other features that distinguishes the 5000i over the base model Senator are leather bolstered, velour trimmed Group A devenish front seats and a Caprice rear bench seat with a suede trimmed centre console. Race-spec brakes, Variotronic power steering rack, 5000i badges and boot decal, level ride suspension, three different engine cover colours - Red - Maroon - Orange - indicating a 200KW motor, ABS and fog lights from the Caprice are standard for the 5000i model. The Senator was created in an attempt to design a vehicle that offered both luxury and performance as well as to complement the existing long-wheelbase Statesman models. Offering smoother styling compared to the HSV Clubsport and GTS models, which favoured performance rather than luxury, the Senator took advantage of the independent rear suspension which was offered on high-priced VP Commodores and Statesman/Caprices at the time and was only one of a handful of Commodore-based cars that had automatic climate control air conditioning. Other features included a leather interior, cruise control and limited-slip differential. A three-spoke steering wheel was featured. Top speed was 220 km/h (137 mph). The car is available with HSV's 180 kW (241 hp) 5.0-litre V8 engine coupled to a four-speed automatic or five-speed manual transmission. There were two versions built: the standard Senator and the Senator 5000i which featured a more powerful 200 kW (270 hp) engine and a 238 km/h (148 mph) top speed. The 5000i was only available with the automatic option. The total number built for both versions was 337.

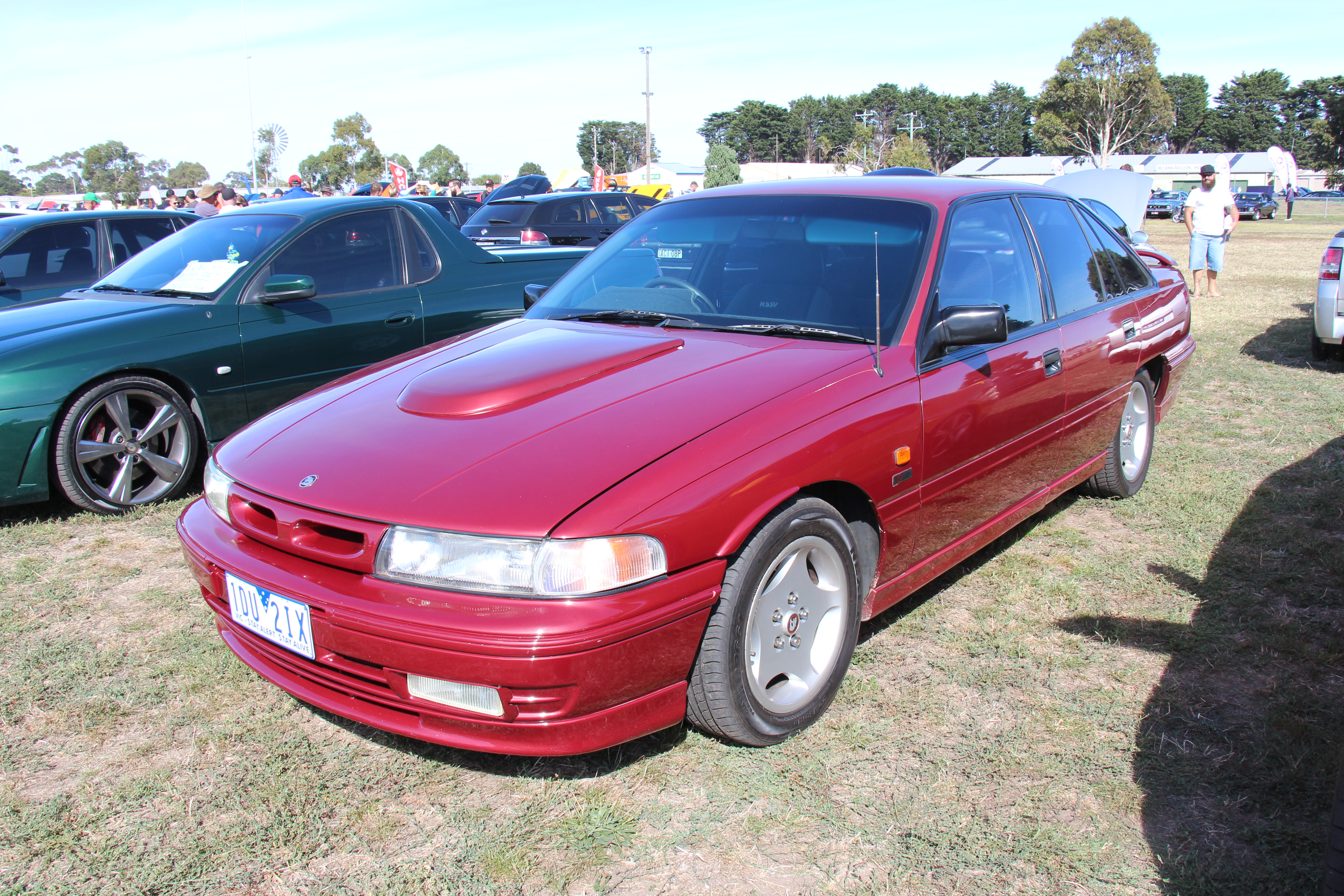
HSV Clubsport sedan

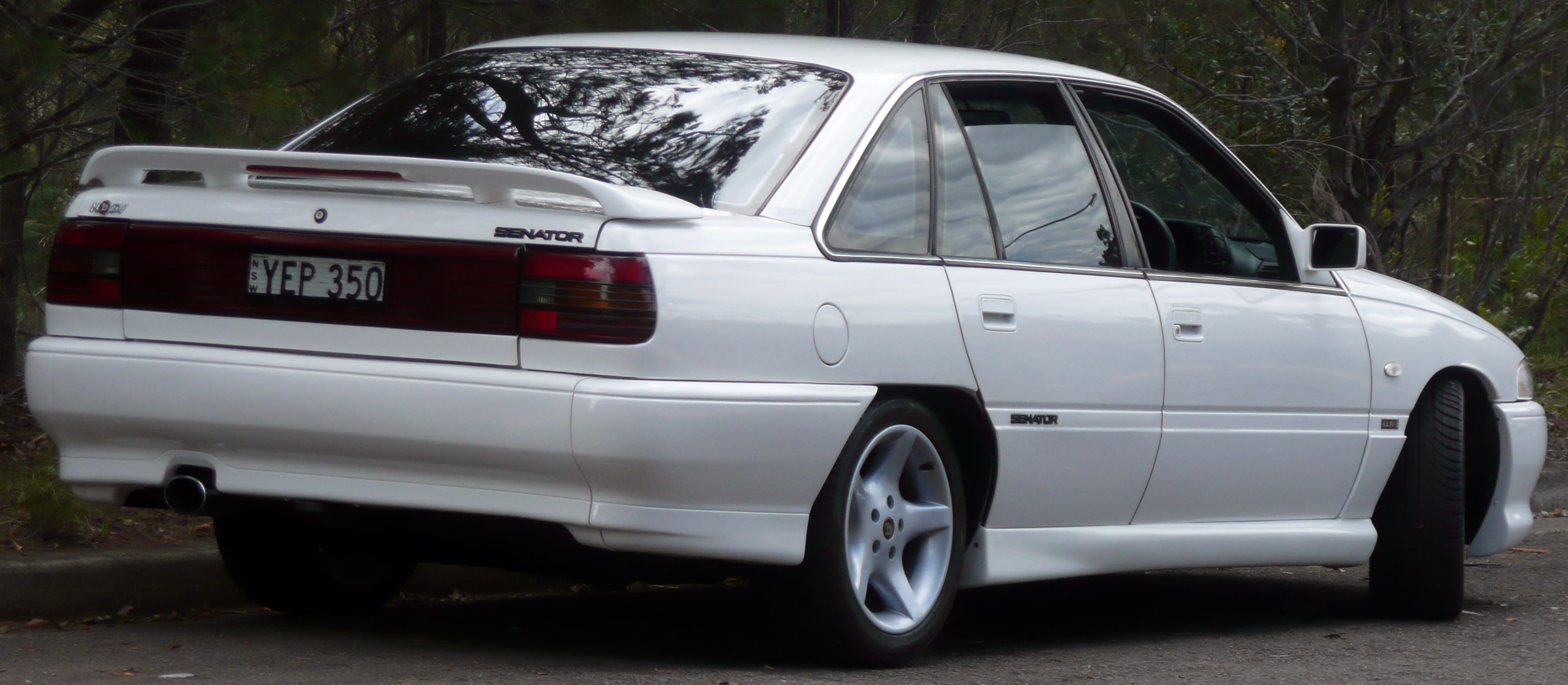
HSV Senator sedan

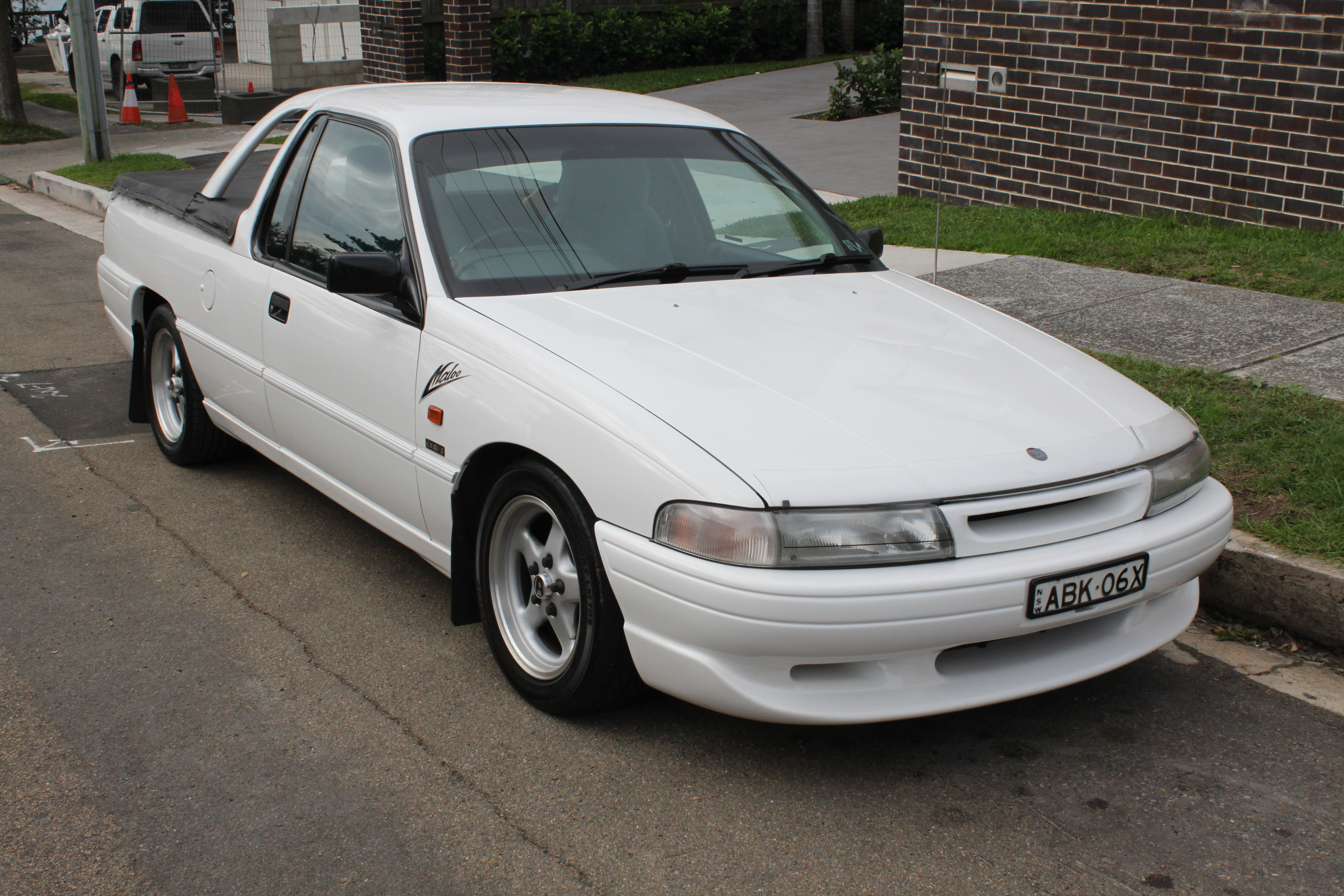
HSV Maloo utility

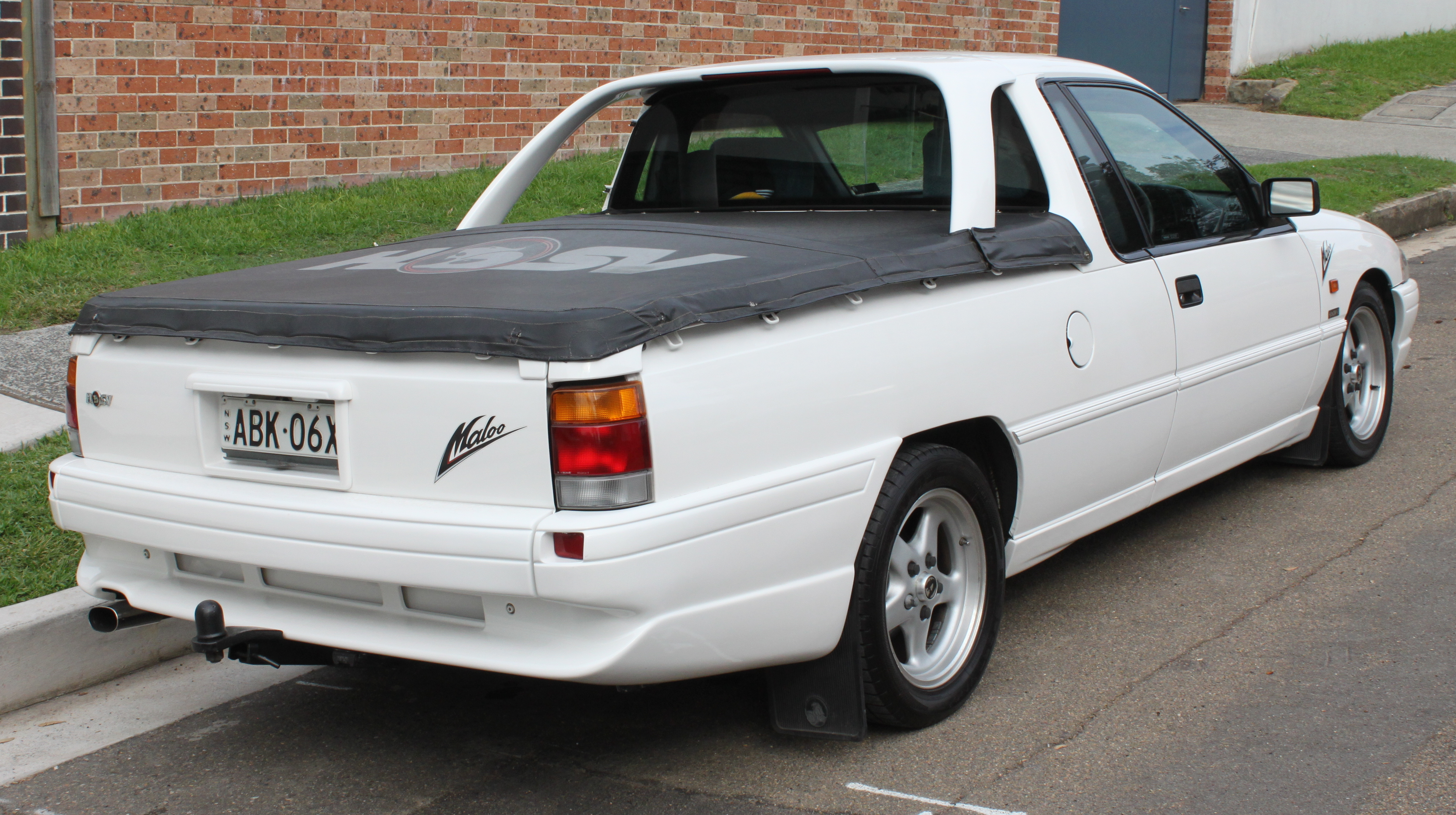
HSV Maloo utility
