= Generative music =

Music created through systems

Generative music is music that emerges randomly through conditions or systems created by the composer. The term was created by the English musician and producer Brian Eno.

== Music ==
Wind chimes are an example of generative music.

With generative music, the artist defines the input, structure and limitations of the system rather than the result. Once activated, a generative music system creates music unattended or with a small degree of human interaction. Generative music is often used for unattended music installations.

The English musician Brian Eno gave the example of wind chimes: the creator of the chimes determines their number, pitches and material, but how and when they strike is determined randomly by the wind. The creator did not compose the music the chimes generate, but instead built the system from which music emerges. In 2001, Eno said: "Ordinary music is like engineering, where everything's built according to a plan, and it's the same every time you play it. Generative music is more like gardening; you plant a seed, and it grows different every time you plant."

== History ==
The term "generative music" was coined by Eno. Eno wrote that while he created the term, he did not create the concept. He cited Steve Reich's 1960s tape pieces, such as "Come Out" and "It's Gonna Rain", as examples of generative music that had inspired him. Eno worked with software developers to create generative music applications, such as Koan and Bloom.

Koan was SSEYO's first real-time music generation system, developed for the Windows platform. Work on Koan started in 1990, and the software was first released to the public in 1994. In 1995 Brian Eno started working with SSEYO's Koan Pro software, work which led to the 1996 publication of his title 'Generative Music 1 with SSEYO Koan Software'. Eno's early relationship with SSEYO Koan and Intermorphic co-founder Tim Cole was captured and published in his 1995 diary A Year with Swollen Appendices.

== Theory ==
There are four primary perspectives on generative music (Wooller, R. et al., 2005) (reproduced with permission):

=== Linguistic/structural ===
Music composed from analytic theories that are so explicit as to be able to generate structurally coherent material (Loy and Abbott 1985; Cope 1991). This perspective has its roots in the generative grammars of language (Chomsky 1956) and music (Lerdahl and Jackendoff 1983), which generate material with a recursive tree structure.

=== Interactive/behavioural ===
Music generated by a system component that has no discernible musical inputs. That is, "not transformational" (Rowe 1991; Lippe 1997:34; Winkler 1998). The Wotja software by Intermorphic, and the Koan software by SSEYO used by Brian Eno to create Generative Music 1, are both examples of this approach.

=== Creative/procedural ===
Music generated by processes that are designed and/or initiated by the composer. Steve Reich's It's Gonna Rain and Terry Riley's In C are examples of this (Eno 1996).

=== Biological/emergent ===
Non-deterministic music (Biles 2002), or music that cannot be repeated, for example, ordinary wind chimes (Dorin 2001). This perspective comes from the broader generative art movement. This revolves around the idea that music, or sounds may be "generated" by a musician "farming" parameters within an ecology, such that the ecology will perpetually produce different variation based on the parameters and algorithms used. An example of this technique is Joseph Nechvatal's Viral symphOny: a collaborative electronic noise music symphony created between the years 2006 and 2008 using custom artificial life software based on a viral model.

== See also ==
- Adaptive music – Music that changes in response to specific events in a video game
- Aleatoric music – Music in which some element of the composition is left to chance
- Algorithmic composition – Technique of using algorithms to create music
- Cellular automaton – Discrete model of computation
- Change ringing – Art of ringing a set of bells in mathematical patterns
- Computer-generated music – Application of computing technology in music
- Generative art – Art created by a set of rules, often using computers
- List of music software
- Live coding – Integration of programming as part of running program
- Musikalisches Würfelspiel – Musical dice games used to randomly generate music
