= Yasuo Nishiguchi =

Japanese businessman

- Born: October 9, 1943 (age 83)

Academic background
- Education: Doshisha University

Academic work
- Discipline: History
- Institutions: Kyoto University

Yasuo Nishiguchi (西口 泰夫, Nishiguchi Yasuo; born 9 October 1943) is a Japanese businessman and former CEO of Kyocera Corporation.

Originally from Sakai city, Osaka Prefecture, he earned a master's degree from Osaka Kyoiku University in 1972. He began work at Kyocera in 1975. In September 2009, he received his PhD from the Graduate School of Policy and Management, Doshisha University.

He is currently a visiting professor at the Graduate School of Business, Doshisha University and part-time lecturer at Kyoto University. He also runs his own business.

== Publications ==
Keesu bukku Kyoto Moderu ([Case Book Kyoto Model], Hakuto-Shobo Publishing Company, 2009)

Gijutsu wo Ikasu Keiei ([Open Integrated Business Management System], Hakuto-Shobo Publishing Company, 2009)
