= Emanuele Pirro =

Italian racing driver (born 1962)

- Pirro at the 2012 6 Hours of Fuji
- Born: 12 January 1962 (age 64); Rome, Italy
- Spouse: Marie-Hélène (m. 1991)
- Children: 2

Formula One World Championship career
- Nationality: (Italy) Italian
- Active years: 1989–1991
- Team(s): Benetton, Scuderia Italia
- Entries: 40 (37 starts)
- Championships: 0
- Wins: 0
- Podiums: 0
- Career points: 3
- Pole positions: 0
- Fastest laps: 0
- First entry: 1989 French Grand Prix
- Last entry: 1991 Australian Grand Prix

24 Hours of Le Mans career
- Years: 1981, 1998–2008, 2010
- Teams: Martini, Gulf, Joest, Champion, Drayson
- Best finish: 1st (2000, 2001, 2002, 2006, 2007)
- Class wins: 6 (2000, 2001, 2002, 2003, 2006, 2007)

Championship titles
- 2000, 2007; 2001, 2005; 1996; 1994, 1995; 1989: 12 Hours of Sebring; ALMS; Super Tourenwagen Cup; Italian Superturismo; Nürburgring 24 Hours

Emanuele Pirro (Italian pronunciation: [emanuˈɛːle ˈpiːro]; born 12 January 1962) is an Italian racing driver who competed in Formula One from 1989 to 1991. In endurance racing, Pirro is a five-time winner of the 24 Hours of Le Mans and a two-time winner of the 12 Hours of Sebring with Audi.

Pirro is a two-time Italian Karting Champion (1976, 1979), Formula Fiat Abarth Champion (1980), two-time Italian Superturismo Champion (1994, 1995), and winner of the Super Tourenwagen Cup (1996).

In sportscar racing, Pirro is a two-time American Le Mans Series champion (2001, 2005), three-time winner of Petit Le Mans (2001, 2005, 2008), winner of the 24 Hours Nürburgring (1989), and two-time winner of the Macau Guia Race (1991, 1992). He has contested over 500 official national and international races, winning over 90.

== Personal life ==
Born in Rome, Pirro traces his roots to the small town of Latera near Viterbo through his mother's family. He is married to Marlene, with whom he has two sons, Cristoforo, born in 1993 (Mechanical Engineer, currently Performance Engineer in F1) and Goffredo, born in 1996 (Automotive Engineer specialised in Motorsport). The family is not related to motorcycle racer Michele Pirro.

== Career ==
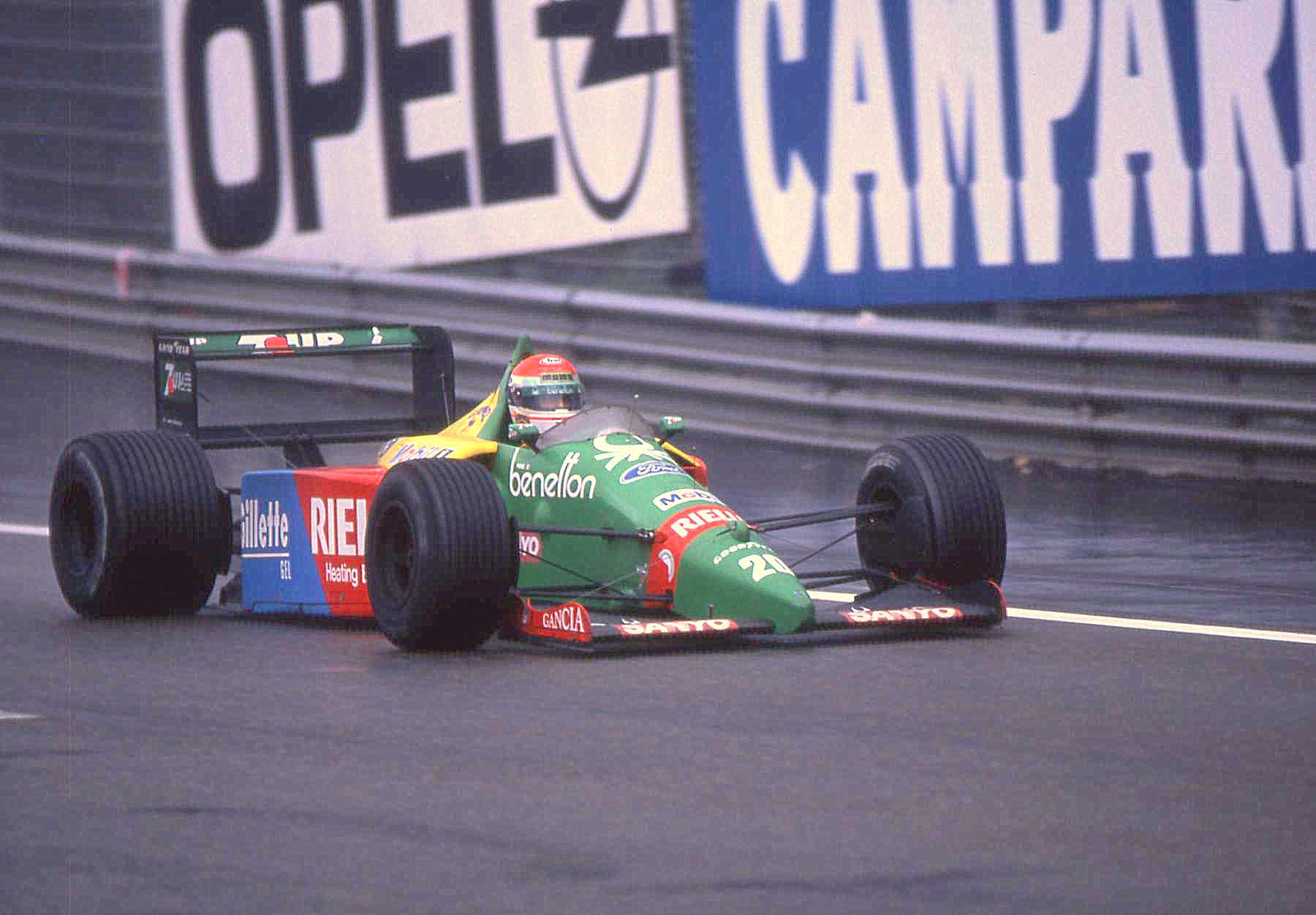
Pirro driving for Benetton at the 1989 Belgian Grand Prix.

Pirro began racing cars in 1980 after having raced seven years in go-karts, where he was two time Italian Champion and runner up in both the European and the World Karting Championships. He went on to win races in all the feeder series he competed in including F3, F3000 and Formula Nippon.

=== Formula One ===
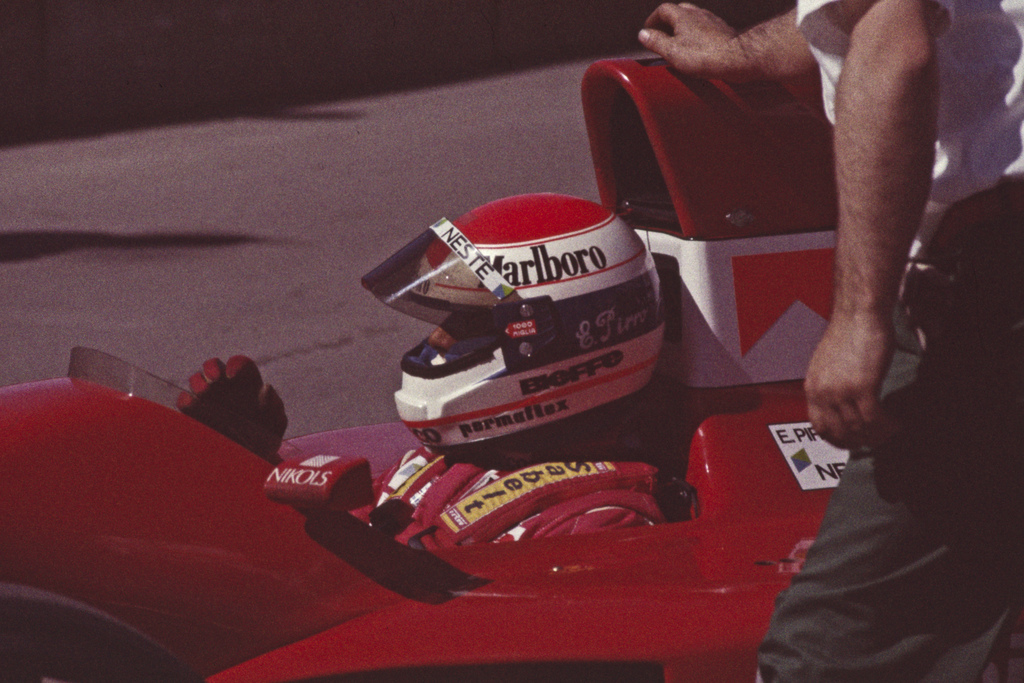
Pirro at the 1991 United States Grand Prix.

In 1988, Pirro was contracted by McLaren to become test driver to develop the new Honda powertrain for the MP4/4, staying on in that role for the following three seasons.

Pirro's racing career in F1 started at the 1989 French Grand Prix for the Benetton-Ford team, replacing Johnny Herbert who was still recovering from injuries sustained in a F3000 accident. For the 1990 and 1991 seasons, he raced for BMS Scuderia Italia.

=== Touring cars ===
Together with his single seater commitments, Pirro raced as a factory driver for BMW in touring car racing up until 1993. He raced and won in ETCC, WTCC, Italian Supertouring and DTM. In DTM, he became one of the only drivers to win in his debut in the series. Notably, he won the 24 Hours Nürburgring, the Macau Guia Race twice, and the Wellington 500 four times, with the legendary BMW M3 E30 and team Schnitzer. After leaving BMW in 1993, he joined Audi to win the 1994 and 1995 Italian Touring Car Championships, followed by the German Touring Car Championship in 1996. Between the years of 1994 and 1996 racing in the Italian and German Supertouring championships, he contested a total of 70 races finishing only once outside of the top-ten after being taken out at the start in 1994 at the Salzburgring.

=== Sportscars ===
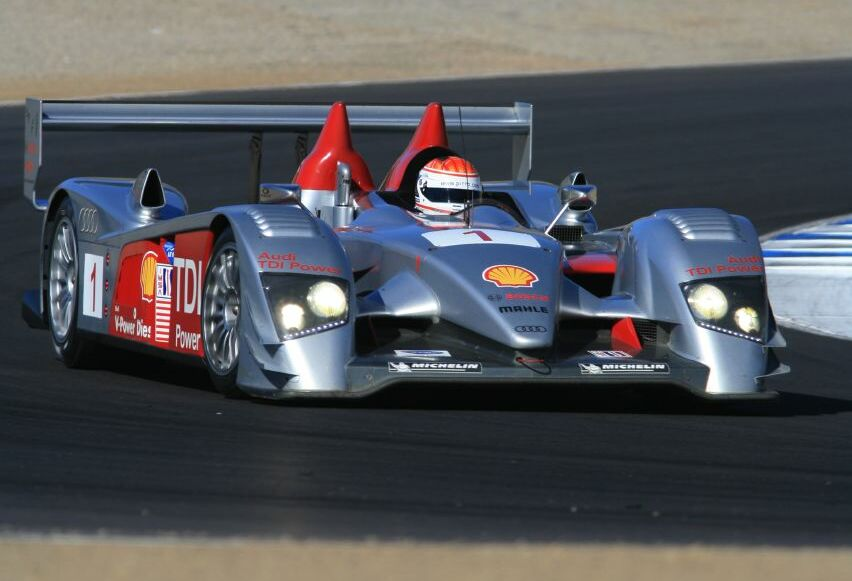
Pirro driving an Audi R10 at Laguna Seca in 2006.

After his debut in endurance races at the young age of 19, winning in his class with the Lancia Beta Montecarlo Gr.5 at the 24 Hours of Daytona, winning the Kyalami 9 Hours and a terrible experience at Le Mans the same year, Pirro scarcely participated in these races except sporadic appearances in Japan, first with a Nissan Gr.C at the Fuji 1000 km and with a Porsche 962 Gr.C at the Suzuka 1000 km. That is until his return to Le Mans in 1998 with a McLaren F1 alongside Dindo Capello and Thomas Bscher ending with a retirement. In 1999, Audi unveiled the R8R with which he scored his first of a record breaking nine consecutive podiums at the French classic. In 2000, along with Tom Kristensen and Frank Biela, he scored the first of three consecutive wins with the new Audi R8. In 2006 together with Frank Biela and Marco Werner he became the first driver to win the 24 Hours of Le Mans with a diesel car, repeating the win in the following year. In 2008 he announced the end of his racing career with Audi sportscars. Between the years of 1999 and 2008, Pirro won five 24 Hours of Le Mans, two ALMS championships, two 12 Hours of Sebring and three Petit Le Mans. After 2008, he competed in a number of additional races including a 12 Hours of Sebring and 24 Hours of Le Mans with Drayson Racing in a Lola-Judd LMP1 car, the 24 hours of the Nürburgring with an Audi R8 GT3, and the 2011 Gold Coast 500 in the Australian V8 Supercars Championship.

=== After racing ===
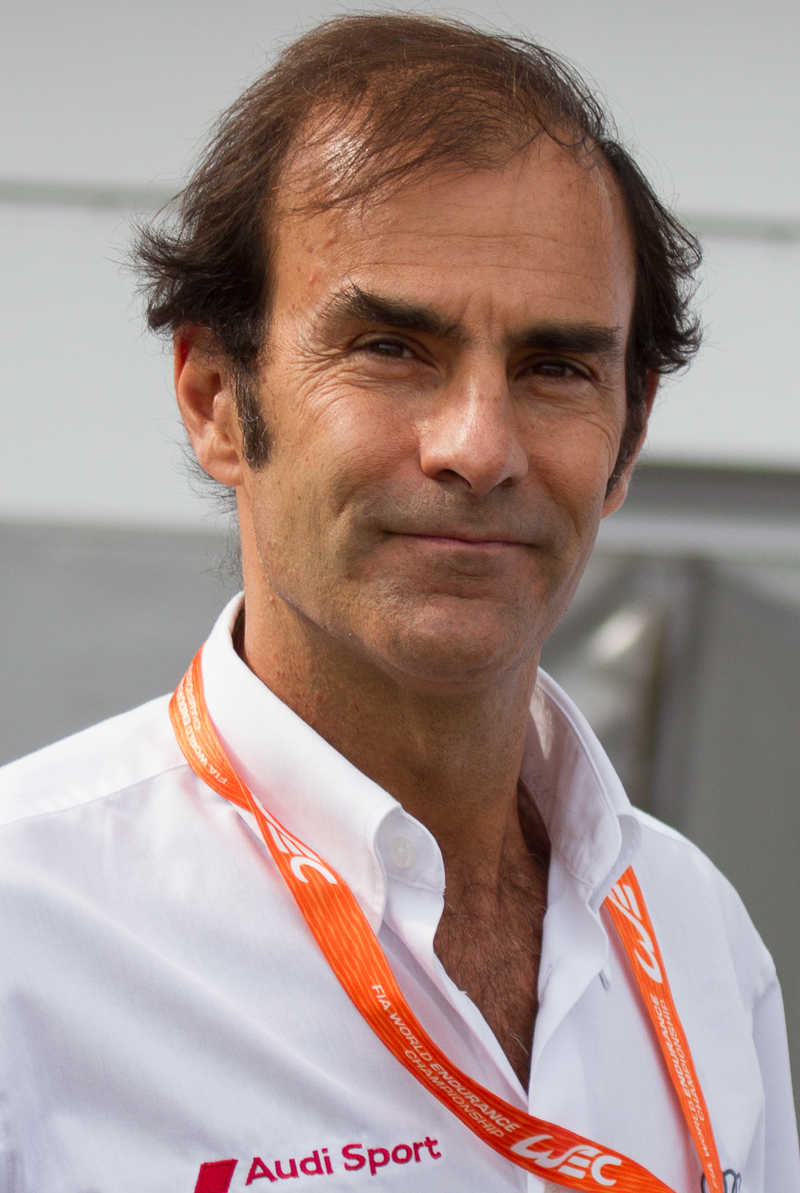
Pirro at the 2012 6 Hours of Fuji

Pirro regularly competes in historic racing. In 2010, he won the Monaco Historic Grand Prix in the Formula 3 Class.

In roles still linked to motorsport, Pirro serves as a Brand Ambassador for Audi, and is a member of; FIA Drivers’ Commission, FIA Circuits’ Commission, FIA Historic Motorsport Commission, ACI Circuits and Safety Commission. In addition, he is the President of the Italian Karting Commission, and Vice President of the Grand Prix Drivers’ Club and the Club des Pilotes des 24 Heures du Mans. He is also a Steward for F1 races, TV pundit and is a frequent guest speaker at events hosted by multinational companies.

In 2015, Pirro entered the first round of the British Universities Karting Championship alongside his two sons.

Pirro owns the Faloria Mountain Spa Resort, a 5-star hotel in Cortina d’Ampezzo.

Pirro has been a regular player for over 25 years in the Nazionale Piloti football team and the “Star Team for the Children” for Prince Albert of Monaco as well as taking part in other charity events.

Pirro also became the Director of the McLaren Racing Driver Development program.

== Race results ==
=== Complete 24 Hours of Le Mans results ===
Year	Team	Co-drivers	Car	Class	Laps	Pos.	Class pos.
1981	(Italy) Martini Racing	(Italy) Beppe Gabbiani	Lancia Beta Monte Carlo	Gr.5	47	DNF	DNF
1998	(United Kingdom) Gulf Team Davidoff (United Kingdom) GTC Competition	(Germany) Dr. Thomas Bscher (Italy) Rinaldo Capello	McLaren F1 GTR-BMW	GT1	228	DNF	DNF
1999	(Germany) Audi Sport Team Joest	(Germany) Frank Biela (Belgium) Didier Theys	Audi R8R	LMP	360	**3rd**	**2nd**
2000	(Germany) Audi Sport Team Joest	(Denmark) Tom Kristensen (Germany) Frank Biela	Audi R8	LMP900	368	**1st**	**1st**
2001	(Germany) Audi Sport Team Joest	(Denmark) Tom Kristensen (Germany) Frank Biela	Audi R8	LMP900	321	**1st**	**1st**
2002	(Germany) Audi Sport Team Joest	(Denmark) Tom Kristensen (Germany) Frank Biela	Audi R8	LMP900	375	**1st**	**1st**
2003	(United States) Champion Racing	(Sweden) Stefan Johansson (Finland) JJ Lehto	Audi R8	LMP900	372	**3rd**	**1st**
2004	(United States) ADT Champion Racing	(Finland) JJ Lehto (Germany) Marco Werner	Audi R8	LMP1	368	**3rd**	**3rd**
2005	(United States) ADT Champion Racing	(Germany) Frank Biela (United Kingdom) Allan McNish	Audi R8	LMP1	364	**3rd**	**3rd**
2006	(Germany) Audi Sport Team Joest	(Germany) Frank Biela (Germany) Marco Werner	Audi R10 TDI	LMP1	380	**1st**	**1st**
2007	(Germany) Audi Sport Team Joest	(Germany) Frank Biela (Germany) Marco Werner	Audi R10 TDI	LMP1	369	**1st**	**1st**
2008	(Germany) Audi Sport North America	(Germany) Frank Biela (Germany) Marco Werner	Audi R10 TDI	LMP1	367	6th	6th
2010	(United Kingdom) Drayson Racing	(United Kingdom) Paul Drayson (United Kingdom) Jonny Cocker	Lola B09/60-Judd	LMP1	254	NC	NC

=== Complete European Formula Two Championship results ===
(key) (Races in bold indicate pole position; races in italics indicate fastest lap.)

Year	Entrant	Chassis	Engine	1	2	3	4	5	6	7	8	9	10	11	Pos.	Pts
1984	Onyx Race Engineering	March 842	BMW	SIL; 6	HOC; 4	THR; 4	VAL; 12	MUG; 4	PAU; Ret	HOC; Ret	MIS; Ret	PER; 6	DON; 2	BRH; 6	6th	18

=== Complete International Formula 3000 results ===
(key) (Races in bold indicate pole position; races in italics indicate fastest lap.)

Year	Entrant	Chassis	Engine	1	2	3	4	5	6	7	8	9	10	11	12	Pos.	Pts
1985	Onyx Racing	March 85B	Cosworth	SIL; 7	THR; 1	EST; 4	NÜR; C	VAL; 1	**PAU**; 2	SPA; Ret	DIJ; Ret	PER; 2	ÖST; 4	ZAN; 5	DON; Ret	**3rd**	**38**
1986	Onyx Racing	March 86B	Cosworth	SIL; 2	VAL; 3	**PAU**; 2	SPA; 19	IMO; Ret	MUG; 6	PER; 13	ÖST; Ret	BIR; Ret	**BUG**; 1	**JAR**; 2		**3rd**	**29**

=== Complete Japanese Formula 3000 Championship results ===
(key) (Races in bold indicate pole position) (Races in italics indicate fastest lap)

Year	Entrant	1	2	3	4	5	6	7	8	9	10	11	DC	Pts
1988	Team LeMans	SUZ; 9	FUJ; 5	MIN; 2	SUZ; 4	SUG; 2	FUJ; 4	SUZ; 3	SUZ; 4				**3rd**	**25**
1989	Team LeMans	SUZ; 5	FUJ; Ret	MIN; Ret	SUZ; 1	SUG	FUJ	SUZ	SUZ				6th	11
1991	Team Hayashi	SUZ	AUT	FUJ	MIN	SUZ	SUG	FUJ	SUZ	FUJ; C	SUZ	FUJ	NC	0

=== Complete Formula One results ===
(key)

Year	Entrant	Chassis	Engine	1	2	3	4	5	6	7	8	9	10	11	12	13	14	15	16	WDC	Pts
1989	Benetton Formula Ltd	Benetton B188	Ford Cosworth DFR 3.5 V8	BRA	SMR	MON	MEX	USA	CAN	FRA; 9	GBR; 11									23rd	2
1989	Benetton Formula Ltd	Benetton B189	Ford HBA4 3.5 V8									GER; Ret	HUN; 8	BEL; 10	ITA; Ret	POR; Ret	ESP; Ret	JPN; Ret	AUS; 5	23rd	2
1990	BMS Scuderia Italia	BMS Dallara 190	Ford Cosworth DFR 3.5 V8	USA	BRA	SMR; Ret	MON; Ret	CAN; Ret	MEX; Ret	FRA; Ret	GBR; 11	GER; Ret	HUN; 10	BEL; Ret	ITA; Ret	POR; 15	ESP; Ret	JPN; Ret	AUS; Ret	NC	0
1991	Scuderia Italia SpA	BMS Dallara 191	Judd GV 3.5 V10	USA; Ret	BRA; 11	SMR; DNPQ	MON; 6	CAN; 9	MEX; DNPQ	FRA; DNPQ	GBR; 10	GER; 10	HUN; Ret	BEL; 8	ITA; 10	POR; Ret	ESP; 15	JPN; Ret	AUS; 7	18th	1

=== Complete Deutsche Tourenwagen Meisterschaft/Masters results ===
(key) (Races in bold indicate pole position) (Races in italics indicate fastest lap)

Year	Team	Car	1	2	3	4	5	6	7	8	9	10	11	12	13	14	15	16	17	18	19	20	21	22	23	24	Pos.	Pts
1989	BMW M Team Schnitzer	BMW M3 Evo	ZOL; 1	ZOL; 2	HOC; 1	HOC; 2	NÜR; 1	NÜR; 2	MFA; 1	MFA; 2	AVU; 1	AVU; 2	NÜR; 1 DNS	NÜR; 2 DNS	NOR; 1	NOR; 2	HOC; 1	HOC; 2	DIE; 1	DIE; 2	NÜR; 1	NÜR; 2	HOC; 1	HOC; 2			NC	0
1990	Schnitzer Motorsport	BMW M3 Sport Evo	ZOL; 1	ZOL; 2	HOC; 1	HOC; 2	NÜR; 1	NÜR; 2	AVU; 1	AVU; 2	MFA; 1	MFA; 2	WUN; 1	WUN; 2	NÜR; 1	NÜR; 2	NOR; 1	NOR; 2	DIE; 1	DIE; 2	NÜR; 1; 1	NÜR; 2; 3	HOC; 1; 7	HOC; 2; 11			15th	36
1992	BMW M Team Bigazzi	BMW M3 Sport Evo	ZOL; 1; 6	ZOL; 2; 3	NÜR; 1; 14	NÜR; 2; 3	WUN; 1 Ret	WUN; 2; 16	AVU; 1; 23	AVU; 2; 3	HOC; 1; 10	HOC; 2 Ret	NÜR; 1; 21	NÜR; 2; 10	NOR; 1; 6	NOR; 2; 8	BRN; 1; 3	BRN; 2 Ret	DIE; 1 Ret	DIE; 2 Ret	ALE; 1; 6	ALE; 2; 10	NÜR; 1 Ret	NÜR; 2; 8	HOC; 1; 9	HOC; 2; 5	12th	85
2004	Audi Sport Team Joest	Audi A4 DTM 2004	HOC; 7	EST; 11	ADR; 9	LAU; 6	NOR; 9	SHA^{1} Ret	NÜR; 11	OSC; 15	ZAN; 7	BRN; 5	HOC; Ret														11th	11

^{1} – A non-championship one-off race was held in 2004 at the streets of Shanghai, China.

=== Complete Italian Superturismo Championship results ===
(key) (Races in bold indicate pole position) (Races in italics indicate fastest lap)

Year	Team	Car	Class	1	2	3	4	5	6	7	8	9	10	11	12	13	14	15	16	17	18	19	20	Pos.	Pts
1992	CiBiEmme Engineering	BMW M3 Sport Evolution	S1	MNZ; 1; 4	MNZ; 2; 3	**MAG**; **1**; 3	MAG; 2; 1	MUG; 1	MUG; 2	BIN; 1	BIN; 2	VAL; 1; 4	VAL; 2; 3	IMO; 1	IMO; 2	MIS; 1 Ret	MIS; 2; 6	PER; 1	PER; 2	VAR; 1	VAR; 2	MNZ; 1	MNZ; 2	6th	82
1993	Scuderia Bigazzi	BMW 318i		MNZ; 1	MNZ; 2	VAL; 1	VAL; 2	MIS; 1	MIS; 2	MAG; 1	MAG; 2	BIN; 1	BIN; 2	IMO; 1	IMO; 2	VAR; 1	VAR; 2	MIS; 1	MIS; 2	PER; 1; 5	PER; 2; 4	MUG; 1; 4	MUG; 2 Ret	13th	28
1994	Audi Sport Italia	Audi 80 Quattro		MNZ; 1; 2	MNZ; 2; 2	VAL; 1; 10	VAL; 2; 1	MAG; 1; 1	**MAG**; **2**; 1	BIN; 1; 1	**BIN**; **2**; 1	MIS; 1; 4	MIS; 2; 4	VAL; 1; 2	VAL; 2; 1	MUG; 1; 4	MUG; 2; 2	PER; 1; 4	PER; 2; 4	VAR; 1; 2	VAR; 2; 2	MUG; 1; 10	MUG; 2; 2	1st	269.5
1995	Audi Sport Italia	Audi A4 Quattro		**MIS**; **1**; 2	MIS; 2; 1	BIN; 1; 1	**BIN**; **2**; 1	MNZ; 1; 1	MNZ; 2; 2	IMO; 1; 1	**IMO**; **2**; 1	**MAG**; **1**; 1	**MAG**; **2**; 2	MUG; 1; 3	MUG; 2; 5	MIS; 1; 1	**MIS**; **2**; 1	PER; 1; 5	PER; 2; 4	VAR; 1; 2	VAR; 2; 1	**VAL**; **1**; 1	**VAL**; **2**; 2	1st	317
1996	A.Z.K./ROC	Audi A4 Quattro		MUG; 1	MUG; 2	MAG; 1	MAG; 2	MNZ; 1	MNZ; 2	BIN; 1	BIN; 2	MIS; 1	MIS; 2	IMO; 1	IMO; 2	PER; 1	PER; 2	PER; 1	PER; 2	VAR; 1	VAR; 2	VAL; 1; 5	VAL; 2; 4	15th	18

=== Complete Super Tourenwagen Cup results ===
(key) (Races in bold indicate pole position) (Races in italics indicate fastest lap)

Year	Team	Car	1	2	3	4	5	6	7	8	9	10	11	12	13	14	15	16	17	18	19	20	Pos.	Pts
1994	Racing Organisation Course	Audi 80 Quattro Competition	**AVU**; 2	WUN; 3	**ZOL**; 3	ZAN; 2	ÖST; 4	**SAL**; Ret	SPA; 5	NÜR; 2													3rd	87
1995	Racing Organisation Course	Audi A4 Quattro	ZOL; 1	ZOL; 2	SPA; 1	SPA; 2	ÖST; 1	ÖST; 2	HOC; 1	HOC; 2	NÜR; 1	NÜR; 2	SAL; 1	SAL; 2	AVU; 1; 10	AVU; 2; 7	NÜR; 1; 1	NÜR; 2; 1					16th	105
1996	A.Z.K./ROC	Audi A4 Quattro	ZOL; 1; 1	ZOL; 2; 1	ASS; 1; 3	ASS; 2; 2	HOC; 1; 1	HOC; 2; 1	SAC; 1; 3	SAC; 2; 1	WUN; 1; 2	WUN; 2; 1	ZWE; 1; 2	ZWE; 2; 3	SAL; 1; 8	SAL; 2; 10	AVU; 1; 4	AVU; 2; 1	NÜR; 1; 1	NÜR; 2; 1			1st	678
1997	A.Z.K./ROC	Audi A4 Quattro	HOC; 1; 11	HOC; 2; 9	ZOL; 1; 4	ZOL; 2; 10	NÜR; 1; 20	NÜR; 2; 7	SAC; 1; 6	SAC; 2 Ret	NOR; 1; 5	NOR; 2; 3	WUN; 1 Ret	WUN; 2 Ret	ZWE; 1; 4	ZWE; 2; 1	SAL; 1; 13	SAL; 2; 7	REG; 1; 19	REG; 2; 11	NÜR; 1; 13	NÜR; 2; 10	6th	357
1998	Abt Sportsline Team Audi	Audi A4	HOC; 1; 16	HOC; 2; 7	NÜR; 1 Ret	NÜR; 2; 13	SAC; 1; 17	SAC; 2 Ret	NOR; 1; 19	NOR; 2; 19	REG; 1; 13	REG; 2; 8	WUN; 1 Ret	WUN; 2 Ret	ZWE; 1; 14	ZWE; 2 Ret	SAL; 1; 7	SAL; 2; 2	OSC; 1; 7	OSC; 2 Ret	NÜR; 1; 10	NÜR; 2; 12	16th	205

=== Complete American Le Mans Series results ===
(key) (Races in bold indicate pole position; races in italics indicate fastest lap.)

Year	Entrant	Class	Chassis	Engine	1	2	3	4	5	6	7	8	9	10	11	12	Rank	Points	Ref
1999	Audi Sport Team Joest	LMP	Audi R8R	Audi 3.6 L Turbo V8	SEB; 5	ATL	MOS	SON	POR	PET	MON	LSV					52nd	20	
2000	Audi Sport North America	LMP	Audi R8	Audi 3.6L Turbo V8	SEB; 1			NÜR; 3	SON; 2	MOS; Ret	TEX; 1	ROS; 4	PET; 2	MON; 2	LSV; 1	ADE; 5	3rd	232	
2000	Audi Sport North America	LMP	Audi R8R	Audi 3.6L Turbo V8		CHA; 6	SIL; 5										3rd	232	
2001	Audi Sport North America	LMP900	Audi R8	Audi 3.6L Turbo V8	TEX; 2	SEB; 2	DON; 2	JAR; 2	SON; 2	POR; 2	MOS; 1	MID; 4	MON; 1	PET; 1			1st	202	
2002	Audi Sport North America	LMP900	Audi R8	Audi 3.6L Turbo V8	SEB; 5	SON; 8	MID; 1	AME; 2	WAS; 3	TRO; 2	MOS; Ret	MON; 1	MIA; 1	PET; 6			4th	206	
2003	ADT Champion Racing	LMP900	Audi R8	Audi 3.6L Turbo V8	SEB; 2	ATL	SON	TRO	MOS	AME	MON	MIA	PET				18th	22	
2004	ADT Champion Racing	LMP1	Audi R8	Audi 3.6L Turbo V8	SEB; 2	MID	LIM	SON	POR	MOS	AME	PET	MON				13th	22	
2005	ADT Champion Racing	LMP1	Audi R8	Audi 3.6L Turbo V8	SEB; 2	ATL; 3	MID; 3	LIM; 2	SON; 1	POR; 1	AME; 1	MOS; 3	PET; 1	MON; 2			1st	182	
2006	Audi Sport North America	LMP1	Audi R10 TDI	Audi 5.5L Turbo V12 (Diesel)	SEB	TEX	MID	LIM	UTA; 1	POR; 2	AME; 1	MOS; 4	PET; 5	MON; 2			5th	80	
2007	Audi Sport North America	LMP1	Audi R10 TDI	Audi 5.5L Turbo V12 (Diesel)	SEB; 1	STP; 2	LNB; 2	TEX; 2	UTA; 2	LIM; 4	MID; 1	AME; 2	MOS; 2	DET; 1	PET	MON	4th	175	
2008	Audi Sport North America	LMP1	Audi R10 TDI	Audi 5.5L Turbo V12 (Diesel)	SEB	STP; Ret	LNB; 2	UTA; Ret	LIM; 3	MID; 2	AME; 2	MOS; 2	DET; DSQ	PET; 1	MON; 2		3rd	156	
2010	Drayson Racing	LMP1	Lola B09/60	Judd GV5.5 S2 5.5 L V10	SEB; 4	LNB	MON; Ret	UTA; 2	LIM	MID	AME	MOS	PET				12th	46	

=== Macau Grand Prix Guia Race results ===
Year	Team	Car	Class	Pos.
1989	(Germany) Team Schnitzer	BMW M3 Sport Evolution	Group A Division 2	DNF
1990	(Germany) Team Schnitzer	BMW M3 Sport Evolution	Group A Division 2	**2nd**
1991	(Germany) Watson’s Team Schnitzer	BMW M3 Sport Evolution	DTM	**1st**
1992	(Germany) Mobil 1 Team Schnitzer	BMW M3 Sport Evolution	DTM	**1st**
1993	(Germany) Watson’s Team Schnitzer	BMW 318i	FIA Class 2	**3rd**

=== Major wins ===
- Historic Grand Prix of Monaco: 1st: 2010
- Spa 24 hours: 1st: 1986, 1990
- 4 hours of Jarama: 1st: 1987
- Grand Prix of Nürburgring: 1st, 1986

== Sources ==
- Profile at www.grandprix.com

Sporting positions
Preceded by Masahiro Hasemi	Guia Race; Winner; 1991–1992	Succeeded by Charles Kwan
Preceded by Roberto Ravaglia	Italia Superturismo Championship; Champion; 1994–1995	Succeeded by Rinaldo Capello
Preceded by Joachim Winkelhock	Super Tourenwagen Cup; Champion; 1996	Succeeded by Laurent Aïello
Preceded by Pierluigi Martini; Yannick Dalmas; Joachim Winkelhock	Winner of the 24 Hours of Le Mans; 2000-2002; With: Frank Biela & Tom Kristensen	Succeeded by Rinaldo Capello; Tom Kristensen; Guy Smith
Preceded by Allan McNish	American Le Mans Series; Champion; 2001	Succeeded by Tom Kristensen
Preceded by Marco Werner; J.J. Lehto	American Le Mans Series; Champion; 2005; With: Frank Biela	Succeeded by Allan McNish; Rinaldo Capello
Preceded by J.J. Lehto; Marco Werner; Tom Kristensen	Winner of the 24 Hours of Le Mans; 2006-2007; With: Frank Biela & Marco Werner	Succeeded by Rinaldo Capello; Tom Kristensen; Allan McNish
