= 2000 Petit Le Mans =

Sportscar endurance race in Georgia, US

Road Atlanta

The 2000 Petit Le Mans presented by Audi was the third running of the Petit Le Mans and the ninth round of the 2000 American Le Mans Series season. It took place at Road Atlanta, Georgia, on September 30, 2000.

== Official results ==
Class winners in bold.

Pos	Class	No	Team	Drivers	Chassis	Tyre	Laps
Pos	Class	No	Team	Drivers	Engine	Tyre	Laps
1	**LMP**	**77**	**(Germany) Audi Sport North America**	**(Italy) Rinaldo Capello (Italy) Michele Alboreto (United Kingdom) Allan McNish**	**Audi R8**	M	**394**
1	**LMP**	**77**	**(Germany) Audi Sport North America**	**(Italy) Rinaldo Capello (Italy) Michele Alboreto (United Kingdom) Allan McNish**	**Audi 3.6L Turbo V8**	M	**394**
2	LMP	78	(Germany) Audi Sport North America	(Germany) Frank Biela (Italy) Emanuele Pirro (Denmark) Tom Kristensen	Audi R8	M	391
2	LMP	78	(Germany) Audi Sport North America	(Germany) Frank Biela (Italy) Emanuele Pirro (Denmark) Tom Kristensen	Audi 3.6L Turbo V8	M	391
3	LMP	1	(United States) Panoz Motor Sports	(Australia) David Brabham (Denmark) Jan Magnussen	Panoz LMP-1 Roadster-S	M	391
3	LMP	1	(United States) Panoz Motor Sports	(Australia) David Brabham (Denmark) Jan Magnussen	Élan 6L8 6.0L V8	M	391
4	LMP	2	(United States) Panoz Motor Sports	(United States) Johnny O'Connell (Japan) Hiroki Katou (Germany) Klaus Graf	Panoz LMP-1 Roadster-S	M	389
4	LMP	2	(United States) Panoz Motor Sports	(United States) Johnny O'Connell (Japan) Hiroki Katou (Germany) Klaus Graf	Élan 6L8 6.0L V8	M	389
5	LMP	42	(Germany) BMW Motorsport (Germany) Schnitzer Motorsport	(Germany) Jörg Müller (Finland) JJ Lehto	BMW V12 LMR	M	383
5	LMP	42	(Germany) BMW Motorsport (Germany) Schnitzer Motorsport	(Germany) Jörg Müller (Finland) JJ Lehto	BMW S70 6.0L V12	M	383
6	LMP	31	(France) Motorola DAMS	(France) Emmanuel Collard (France) Éric Bernard	Cadillac Northstar LMP	P	380
6	LMP	31	(France) Motorola DAMS	(France) Emmanuel Collard (France) Éric Bernard	Cadillac Northstar 4.0L Turbo V8	P	380
7	LMP	19	(United States) Team Cadillac	(South Africa) Wayne Taylor (Italy) Max Angelelli (Belgium) Eric van de Poele	Cadillac Northstar LMP	P	372
7	LMP	19	(United States) Team Cadillac	(South Africa) Wayne Taylor (Italy) Max Angelelli (Belgium) Eric van de Poele	Cadillac Northstar 4.0L Turbo V8	P	372
8	LMP	9	(United States) Team Cadillac	(United States) Butch Leitzinger (United Kingdom) Andy Wallace (France) Franck Lagorce	Cadillac Northstar LMP	P	359
8	LMP	9	(United States) Team Cadillac	(United States) Butch Leitzinger (United Kingdom) Andy Wallace (France) Franck Lagorce	Cadillac Northstar 4.0L Turbo V8	P	359
9	**GTS**	**4**	**(United States) Corvette Racing**	**(United States) Andy Pilgrim (United States) Kelly Collins (France) Franck Fréon**	**Chevrolet Corvette C5-R**	G	**358**
9	**GTS**	**4**	**(United States) Corvette Racing**	**(United States) Andy Pilgrim (United States) Kelly Collins (France) Franck Fréon**	**Chevrolet 7.0L V8**	G	**358**
10	GTS	92	(France) Viper Team Oreca	(United States) Tommy Archer (Netherlands) Patrick Huisman (France) Boris Derichebourg	Dodge Viper GTS-R	M	358
10	GTS	92	(France) Viper Team Oreca	(United States) Tommy Archer (Netherlands) Patrick Huisman (France) Boris Derichebourg	Dodge 8.0L V10	M	358
11	GTS	3	(United States) Corvette Racing	(United States) Chris Kneifel (Canada) Ron Fellows (United Kingdom) Justin Bell	Chevrolet Corvette C5-R	G	357
11	GTS	3	(United States) Corvette Racing	(United States) Chris Kneifel (Canada) Ron Fellows (United Kingdom) Justin Bell	Chevrolet 7.0L V8	G	357
12	GTS	91	(France) Viper Team Oreca	(Monaco) Olivier Beretta (Austria) Karl Wendlinger (Belgium) Marc Duez	Dodge Viper GTS-R	M	353
12	GTS	91	(France) Viper Team Oreca	(Monaco) Olivier Beretta (Austria) Karl Wendlinger (Belgium) Marc Duez	Dodge 8.0L V10	M	353
13	LMP	32	(France) Motorola DAMS	(France) Christophe Tinseau (Belgium) Marc Goossens	Cadillac Northstar LMP	P	353
13	LMP	32	(France) Motorola DAMS	(France) Christophe Tinseau (Belgium) Marc Goossens	Cadillac Northstar 4.0L Turbo V8	P	353
14	GTS	93	(France) Viper Team Oreca	(United States) David Donohue (France) Jean-Philippe Belloc (France) Dominique Dupuy	Dodge Viper GTS-R	M	353
14	GTS	93	(France) Viper Team Oreca	(United States) David Donohue (France) Jean-Philippe Belloc (France) Dominique Dupuy	Dodge 8.0L V10	M	353
15	**GT**	**51**	**(United States) Dick Barbour Racing**	**(Germany) Sascha Maassen (France) Bob Wollek**	**Porsche 911 GT3-R**	M	**343**
15	**GT**	**51**	**(United States) Dick Barbour Racing**	**(Germany) Sascha Maassen (France) Bob Wollek**	**Porsche 3.6L Flat-6**	M	**343**
16	GT	23	(United States) Alex Job Racing	(United States) Randy Pobst (United States) Anthony Lazzaro (Belgium) Bruno Lambert	Porsche 911 GT3-R	M	335
16	GT	23	(United States) Alex Job Racing	(United States) Randy Pobst (United States) Anthony Lazzaro (Belgium) Bruno Lambert	Porsche 3.6L Flat-6	M	335
17 DNF	GT	5	(United States) Dick Barbour Racing	(Germany) Dirk Müller (Germany) Lucas Luhr	Porsche 911 GT3-R	M	333
17 DNF	GT	5	(United States) Dick Barbour Racing	(Germany) Dirk Müller (Germany) Lucas Luhr	Porsche 3.6L Flat-6	M	333
18	GT	80	(United States) G & W Motorsports	(United States) Darren Law (United States) Michael Schrom (United States) John Morton	Porsche 911 GT3-R	D	331
18	GT	80	(United States) G & W Motorsports	(United States) Darren Law (United States) Michael Schrom (United States) John Morton	Porsche 3.6L Flat-6	D	331
19	GT	52	(Germany) Seikel Motorsport	(Canada) Tony Burgess (United States) Kurt Mathewson (United States) Grady Willingham	Porsche 911 GT3-R	Y	328
19	GT	52	(Germany) Seikel Motorsport	(Canada) Tony Burgess (United States) Kurt Mathewson (United States) Grady Willingham	Porsche 3.6L Flat-6	Y	328
20	GT	81	(United States) G & W Motorsports	(United States) Cindi Lux (United States) Belinda Endress (United Kingdom) Divina Galica	Porsche 911 GT3-R	D	326
20	GT	81	(United States) G & W Motorsports	(United States) Cindi Lux (United States) Belinda Endress (United Kingdom) Divina Galica	Porsche 3.6L Flat-6	D	326
21	GTS	09	(United States) Roock Motorsport North America	(United States) Spencer Trenery (United States) Mike Fitzgerald	Porsche 911 GT2	Y	318
21	GTS	09	(United States) Roock Motorsport North America	(United States) Spencer Trenery (United States) Mike Fitzgerald	Porsche 3.8L Turbo Flat-6	Y	318
22	GT	34	(United States) Orbit	(United States) Leo Hindery (United States) Peter Baron (United States) Gian Luigi Buitoni	Porsche 911 GT3-R	D	317
22	GT	34	(United States) Orbit	(United States) Leo Hindery (United States) Peter Baron (United States) Gian Luigi Buitoni	Porsche 3.6L Flat-6	D	317
23 DNF	GT	21	(United States) MCR/Aspen Knolls	(United States) Shane Lewis (United States) Cort Wagner (United States) Bob Mazzuoccola	Porsche 911 GT3-R	P	316
23 DNF	GT	21	(United States) MCR/Aspen Knolls	(United States) Shane Lewis (United States) Cort Wagner (United States) Bob Mazzuoccola	Porsche 3.6L Flat-6	P	316
24 DNF	GT	7	(United States) Prototype Technology Group	(United States) Johannes van Overbeek (United States) Boris Said (Germany) Hans Joachim Stuck	BMW M3	Y	303
24 DNF	GT	7	(United States) Prototype Technology Group	(United States) Johannes van Overbeek (United States) Boris Said (Germany) Hans Joachim Stuck	BMW 3.2L I6	Y	303
25	GT	30	(United States) White Lightning Racing	(United States) Gunnar Jeannette (United States) Wayne Jackson (United States) Joe Policastro Jr.	Porsche 911 GT3-R	M	273
25	GT	30	(United States) White Lightning Racing	(United States) Gunnar Jeannette (United States) Wayne Jackson (United States) Joe Policastro Jr.	Porsche 3.6L Flat-6	M	273
26	GTS	61	(United Kingdom) Chamberlain Motorsport	(Venezuela) Milka Duno (South Africa) Stephen Watson (France) Xavier Pompidou	Chrysler Viper GTS-R	M	259
26	GTS	61	(United Kingdom) Chamberlain Motorsport	(Venezuela) Milka Duno (South Africa) Stephen Watson (France) Xavier Pompidou	Chrysler 8.0L V10	M	259
27	GT	69	(Canada) Kyser Racing	(Canada) Kye Wankum (Canada) Greg Doff (United States) Joe Foster	Porsche 911 GT3-R	P	254
27	GT	69	(Canada) Kyser Racing	(Canada) Kye Wankum (Canada) Greg Doff (United States) Joe Foster	Porsche 3.6L Flat-6	P	254
28 DNF	GTS	08	(United States) Roock Motorsport North America	(United States) Zak Brown (United States) Vic Rice (United States) Martin Snow	Porsche 911 GT2	Y	161
28 DNF	GTS	08	(United States) Roock Motorsport North America	(United States) Zak Brown (United States) Vic Rice (United States) Martin Snow	Porsche 3.8L Turbo Flat-6	Y	161
29 DNF	LMP	0	(Italy) Team Rafanelli SRL	(Italy) Mimmo Schiattarella (Belgium) Didier de Radiguès (Germany) Norman Simon	Lola B2K/10	M	159
29 DNF	LMP	0	(Italy) Team Rafanelli SRL	(Italy) Mimmo Schiattarella (Belgium) Didier de Radiguès (Germany) Norman Simon	Judd (Rafanelli) GV4 4.0L V10	M	159
30 DNF	LMP	37	(United States) Intersport Racing	(United States) Jon Field (United States) Rick Sutherland (United Kingdom) Oliver Gavin	Lola B2K/10	Y	112
30 DNF	LMP	37	(United States) Intersport Racing	(United States) Jon Field (United States) Rick Sutherland (United Kingdom) Oliver Gavin	Judd GV4 4.0L V10	Y	112
31 DNF	GT	66	(United States) The Racer's Group	(United States) Kevin Buckler (United States) Philip Collin (United States) Jim Michaelian	Porsche 911 GT3-R	P	98
31 DNF	GT	66	(United States) The Racer's Group	(United States) Kevin Buckler (United States) Philip Collin (United States) Jim Michaelian	Porsche 3.6L Flat-6	P	98
32 DNF	GT	15	(United States) Dick Barbour Racing	(United States) Paul Newman (United States) Mike Brockman (Mexico) Randy Wars	Porsche 911 GT3-R	M	90
32 DNF	GT	15	(United States) Dick Barbour Racing	(United States) Paul Newman (United States) Mike Brockman (Mexico) Randy Wars	Porsche 3.6L Flat-6	M	90
33 DNF	GTS	12	(United States) Patriot Motorsports	(United States) John Paul Jr. (United States) Neil Hannemann (United States) Bret Parker	Dodge Viper GTS-R	D	63
33 DNF	GTS	12	(United States) Patriot Motorsports	(United States) John Paul Jr. (United States) Neil Hannemann (United States) Bret Parker	Dodge 8.0L V10	D	63
34 DNF	LMP	43	(Germany) BMW Motorsport (Germany) Schnitzer Motorsport	(France) Jean-Marc Gounon (United States) Bill Auberlen	BMW V12 LMR	M	59
34 DNF	LMP	43	(Germany) BMW Motorsport (Germany) Schnitzer Motorsport	(France) Jean-Marc Gounon (United States) Bill Auberlen	BMW S70 6.0L V12	M	59
35 DNF	GT	71	(Australia) Skea Racing International	(Australia) Rohan Skea (United States) Doc Bundy (United Kingdom) Richard Dean	Porsche 911 GT3-R	P	51
35 DNF	GT	71	(Australia) Skea Racing International	(Australia) Rohan Skea (United States) Doc Bundy (United Kingdom) Richard Dean	Porsche 3.6L Flat-6	P	51
36 DNF	LMP	28	(Germany) Konrad Motorsport	(Austria) Franz Konrad (United States) Terry Borcheller (United States) Charles Slater	Lola B2K/10	G	22
36 DNF	LMP	28	(Germany) Konrad Motorsport	(Austria) Franz Konrad (United States) Terry Borcheller (United States) Charles Slater	Ford (Roush) 6.0L V8	G	22
37 DNF	LMP	36	(United States) Johansson-Matthews Racing	(Sweden) Stefan Johansson (United Kingdom) Guy Smith (Germany) Ralf Kelleners	Reynard 2KQ-LM	Y	12
37 DNF	LMP	36	(United States) Johansson-Matthews Racing	(Sweden) Stefan Johansson (United Kingdom) Guy Smith (Germany) Ralf Kelleners	Judd GV4 4.0L V10	Y	12
38 DNF	GT	10	(United States) Prototype Technology Group	(United States) Brian Cunningham (United States) Peter Cunningham (Sweden) Niclas Jönsson	BMW M3	Y	8
38 DNF	GT	10	(United States) Prototype Technology Group	(United States) Brian Cunningham (United States) Peter Cunningham (Sweden) Niclas Jönsson	BMW 3.2L I6	Y	8
39 DNF	GT	70	(Australia) Skea Racing International	(United Kingdom) Johnny Mowlem (United States) David Murry	Porsche 911 GT3-R	P	6
39 DNF	GT	70	(Australia) Skea Racing International	(United Kingdom) Johnny Mowlem (United States) David Murry	Porsche 3.6L Flat-6	P	6

== Statistics ==
- Pole Position - #77 Audi Sport North America - 1:10.379
- Fastest Lap - #77 Audi Sport North America - 1:11.782
- Distance - 1610.567 km
- Average Speed - 176.122 km/h

American Le Mans Series
Previous race: 2000 Rose City Grand Prix	2000 season	Next race: 2000 Monterey Sports Car Championships
