= 1995 Super Tourenwagen Cup =

Car racing series

Seasons
- ← 1994 1996 →

The 1995 ADAC Super Touren Wagen Cup was the second edition of the Super Tourenwagen Cup (STW). The season was marred by the death of British driver Kieth O'dor during the second race of the AVUS round,

== Teams and drivers ==
Team	Car	No.	Drivers	Rounds	Class
(Italy) BMW Team Bigazzi	BMW 318iS	2	(Italy) Roberto Ravaglia	All	
(Italy) BMW Team Bigazzi	BMW 318iS	3	(Germany) Alexander Burgstaller	All	
(France) ROC Competition	Audi A4 Quattro	4	(Italy) Tamara Vidali	All	
(France) ROC Competition	Audi A4 Quattro	5	(Italy) Emanuele Pirro	7–8	
(Germany) Ford Mondeo Team Schübel	Ford Mondeo 4x4	6	(Italy) Riccardo Patrese	1, 3–8	
(Germany) Ford Mondeo Team Schübel	Ford Mondeo 4x4	7	(Belgium) Thierry Boutsen	All	
(Germany) BMW Team Schnitzer	BMW 318iS	8	(Germany) Joachim Winkelhock	All	
(Germany) BMW Team Schnitzer	BMW 318iS	9	(Netherlands) Peter Kox	All	
(Germany) BMW Team Isert	BMW 318iS	10	(United Kingdom) Steve Soper	6–7	
(Germany) BMW Team Schnitzer	BMW 318iS	10	(United Kingdom) Steve Soper	8	
(Germany) A.Z.K.Team Schneider	Audi A4 Quattro	11	(Germany) Altfrid Heger	All	
(Germany) Honda Team Linder	Honda Accord	12	(Germany) Armin Hahne	All	
(Germany) Honda Team Linder	Honda Accord	14	(Germany) Klaus Niedzwiedz	All	
(Germany) Ford Mondeo Team Wolf	Ford Mondeo 4x4	15	(Denmark) Kris Nissen	1	
(Germany) Ford Mondeo Team Schübel	Ford Mondeo 4x4	15	(Denmark) Kris Nissen	6–8	
(Germany) Ford Wolf Racing	Ford Mondeo Ghia	16	(Germany) Claudia Hürtgen	All	P
(Switzerland) Ford Team Eggenberger	Ford Mondeo Ghia	17	(Germany) Roland Asch	1–6, 8	
(Switzerland) Ford Team Eggenberger	Ford Mondeo Ghia	18	(Switzerland) Johnny Hauser	All	P
(Germany) Team Kaucuk Isert	BMW 318iS	19	(Czech Republic) Josef Venc	All	P
(Germany) BMW Team Isert	BMW 318iS	20	(Germany) Harald Grohs	1-5	
(Germany) BMW Team Isert	BMW 318iS	21	(Germany) Jörg Müller	1-4, 6–8	
(Italy) Nissan Primera Racing	Nissan Primera eGT	22	(Germany) Sascha Maassen	1-7	
(Italy) Nissan Primera Racing	Nissan Primera eGT	23	(United Kingdom) Kieth O'Dor	1-7	
(Italy) Nissan Primera Racing	Nissan Primera eGT	24	(Italy) Ivan Capelli	1-2	
(Italy) Nissan Primera Racing	Nissan Primera 4x4	24	(Italy) Ivan Capelli	3-7	
(Germany) BMW Team Isert	BMW 318iS	25	(Australia) David Brabham	5	
(Germany) Lauderbach Motorsport	Nissan Primera eGT	27	(Germany) Armin Bernhard	1	P
(Germany) Lauderbach Motorsport	Nissan Primera eGT	27	(Germany) Dirk Adorf	2	P
(Germany) Lauderbach Motorsport	Opel Vectra GT	27	(Germany) Klaus Panchyrz	6-7	P
(Germany) Pm Car Sports	BMW 318iS	29	(Germany) Michael Heigert	All	P
(Germany) AM-Holzer Motorsport	BMW 318iS	31	(Germany) Rüdiger Julius	1-7	P
(Germany) AM-Holzer Motorsport	BMW 318iS	32	(Austria) Alexander Gaggl	All	P
(Germany) Pm Car Sports	BMW 318iS	33	(Germany) Marc Gindorf	All	P
(Switzerland) Ulrich Motorsport	BMW 318iS	34	(Switzerland) Patrick Ulrich	All	P
(Austria) MIG Motorsport Interessen	Audi 80 Quattro	35	(Austria) Philipp Peter	All	P
(Czech Republic) Bychl Euroracing	BMW 318iS	37	(Czech Republic) Miloš Bychl	5	P
(Germany) AM-Holzer Motorsport	BMW 318iS	39	(Germany) Marco Werner	8	P
(Germany) Ford Mondeo Team Wolf	Ford Mondeo Ghia	40	(Italy) Enrico Bertaggia	6-8	P
(Switzerland) Ford Team Eggenberger	Ford Mondeo Ghia	41	(Germany) Roland Asch	7	
(Germany) A.Z.K. Team Schneider	Audi A4 Quattro	42	(Italy) Rinaldo Capello	7-8	
(Germany) A.Z.K. Team Schneider	Audi A4 Quattro	44	(Germany) Hans-Joachim Stuck	All	
(France) ROC Competition	Audi A4 Quattro	45	(Germany) Frank Biela	All	

Icon	Class
P	Private Drivers

== Race calendar and results ==
Round		Circuit	Date	Pole position	Fastest lap	Winning driver	Winning team
1	R1	(Belgium) Zolder	30 April	(Germany) Altfrid Heger	(Germany) Frank Biela	(Germany) Frank Biela	ROC Competition
1	R2	(Belgium) Zolder	30 April		(Italy) Tamara Vidali	(Germany) Frank Biela	ROC Competition
2	R1	(Belgium) Spa-Francorchamps	14 May	(Netherlands) Peter Kox	(Germany) Joachim Winkelhock	(Germany) Joachim Winkelhock	BMW Team Schnitzer
2	R2	(Belgium) Spa-Francorchamps	14 May		(Netherlands) Peter Kox	(Germany) Joachim Winkelhock	BMW Team Schnitzer
3	R1	(Austria) Österreichring	28 May	(Germany) Joachim Winkelhock	(Germany) Joachim Winkelhock	(Germany) Joachim Winkelhock	BMW Team Schnitzer
3	R2	(Austria) Österreichring	28 May		(Netherlands) Peter Kox	(Germany) Frank Biela	ROC Competition
4	R1	(Germany) Hockenheimring	11 Jun	(Germany) Frank Biela	(Germany) Frank Biela	(Germany) Frank Biela	ROC Competition
4	R2	(Germany) Hockenheimring	11 Jun		(Germany) Hans-Joachim Stuck	(Germany) Frank Biela	ROC Competition
5	R1	(Germany) Nürburgring	2 Jul	(Italy) Roberto Ravaglia	(Germany) Roland Asch	(Germany) Roland Asch	Ford Team Eggenberger
5	R2	(Germany) Nürburgring	2 Jul		(Germany) Hans-Joachim Stuck	(Germany) Alexander Burgstaller	BMW Team Bigazzi
6	R1	(Austria) Salzburgring	27 Aug	(Germany) Altfrid Heger	(Germany) Alexander Burgstaller	(Germany) Joachim Winkelhock	BMW Team Schnitzer
6	R2	(Austria) Salzburgring	27 Aug		(Germany) Joachim Winkelhock	(Germany) Joachim Winkelhock	BMW Team Schnitzer
7	R1	(Germany) AVUS	10 Sep	(United Kingdom) Kieth O'Dor	(Netherlands) Peter Kox	(United Kingdom) Kieth O'Dor	Nissan Primera Racing
7	R2	(Germany) AVUS	10 Sep		(Germany) Roland Asch	(Germany) Joachim Winkelhock	BMW Team Schnitzer
8	R1	(Germany) Nürburgring	24 Sep	(Italy) Emanuele Pirro	(Italy) Emanuele Pirro	(Italy) Emanuele Pirro	ROC Competition
8	R2	(Germany) Nürburgring	24 Sep		(Germany) Altfrid Heger	(Italy) Emanuele Pirro	ROC Competition

== Round 1 | (Belgium) Zolder ==
Qualifying

Pos	No	Driver	Car	Lap Time
1	11	(Germany) Altfrid Heger	Audi A4 Quattro	1.42.23
2	45	(Germany) Frank Biela	Audi A4 Quattro	1.42.54
3	44	(Germany) Hans-Joachim Stuck	Audi A4 Quattro	1.42.89
4	8	(Germany) Joachim Winkelhock	BMW 318iS	1:43.12
5	21	(Germany) Jorg Muller	BMW 318iS	1:43.64
6	9	(Netherlands) Peter Kox	BMW 318iS	1:43.69
7	2	(Italy) Roberto Ravaglia	BMW 318iS	1.43.80
8	3	(Germany) Alexander Burgstaller	BMW 318iS	1.43.87
9	24	(Italy) Ivan Capelli	Nissan Primera eGT	1.44.17
10	4	(Italy) Tamara Vidali	Audi A4 Quattro	1.44.25
11	17	(Germany) Roland Asch	Ford Mondeo Ghia	1.44.31
12	12	(Germany) Armin Hahne	Honda Accord	1.44.56
13	20	(Germany) Harald Grohs	BMW 318iS	1.44.81
14	23	(United Kingdom) Kieth O'Dor	Nissan Primera eGT	1.44.91
15	35	(Germany) Philipp Peter	Audi 80 Quattro	1.45.18
16	22	(Germany) Sascha Maassen	Nissan Primera eGT	1.45.25
17	14	(Germany) Klaus Niedzwiedz	Honda Accord	1.45.50
18	18	(Switzerland) Johnny Hauser	Ford Mondeo Ghia	1.45.75
19	19	(Czech Republic) Josef Venc	BMW 318iS	1.46.11
20	33	(Germany) Marc Gindorf	BMW 318iS	1.46.32
21	32	(Austria) Alexander Gaggl	BMW 318iS	1.46.59
22	34	(Switzerland) Patrick Ulrich	BMW 318iS	1.46.83
23	31	(Germany) Rüdiger Julius	BMW 318iS	1.46.97
24	7	(Belgium) Thierry Boutsen	Ford Mondeo 4x4	1.47.65
25	6	(Italy) Riccardo Patrese	Ford Mondeo 4x4	1.47.88
26	16	(Germany) Claudia Hürtgen	Ford Mondeo Ghia	1.48.50
27	15	(Germany) Kris Nissen	Ford Mondeo 4x4	1.48.54
28	27	(Germany) Armin Bernhard	Nissan Primera eGT	1.49.30
29	29	(Germany) Michael Heigert	BMW 318iS	1.50.89

Race 1

Pos	No	Driver	Constructor	Time/Retired	Points
1	45	(Germany) Frank Biela	Audi A4 Quattro	14 laps in 27:27.18	20
2	44	(Germany) Hans Joachim Stuck	Audi A4 Quattro	+9.65s	19
3	11	(Germany) Altfrid Heger	Audi A4 Quattro	+10.88s	18
4	4	(Italy) Tamara Vidali	Audi A4 Quattro	+13.72s	17
5	2	(Italy) Roberto Ravaglia	BMW 318iS	+24.87s	16
6	8	(Germany) Joachim Winkelhock	BMW 318iS	+28.05s	15
7	3	(Germany) Alexander Burgstaller	BMW 318iS	+33.73s	14
8	35	(Germany) Philipp Peter	Audi 80 Quattro	+38.50s	13
9	23	(United Kingdom) Kieth O'Dor	Nissan Primera eGT	+49.01s	12
10	7	(Belgium) Thierry Boutsen	Ford Mondeo 4x4	+52.44s	11
11	24	(Italy) Ivan Capelli	Nissan Primera eGT	+1.02.23s	10
12	9	(Netherlands) Peter Kox	BMW 318iS	+1.07.38s	9
13	21	(Germany) Jorg Muller	BMW 318iS	+1.11.20s	8
14	33	(Germany) Marc Gindorf	BMW 318iS	+1.19.51s	7
15	19	(Czech Republic) Josef Venc	BMW 318iS	+1.25.09s	6
16	31	(Germany) Rüdiger Julius	BMW 318iS	+1.26.22s	5
17	32	(Austria) Alexander Gaggl	BMW 318iS	+1.36.05s	4
18	6	(Italy) Riccardo Patrese	Ford Mondeo 4x4	+1.51.29s	3
19	20	(Germany) Harald Grohs	BMW 318iS	+1.53.27s	2
20	16	(Germany) Claudia Hürtgen	Ford Mondeo Ghia	+1 lap	1
21	34	(Switzerland) Patrick Ulrich	BMW 318iS	+1 lap	
22	27	(Germany) Armin Bernhard	Nissan Primera eGT	+1 lap	
23	22	(Germany) Sascha Maassen	Nissan Primera eGT	+2 laps	
DNF	14	(Germany) Klaus Niedzwiedz	Honda Accord	+4 laps	
DNF	29	(Germany) Michael Heigert	BMW 318iS	+10 laps	
DNF	12	(Germany) Armin Hahne	Honda Accord	+12 laps	
DNF	15	(Germany) Kris Nissen	Ford Mondeo 4x4	+12 laps	
DNF	17	(Germany) Roland Asch	Ford Mondeo Ghia	+12 laps	
DNF	18	(Switzerland) Johnny Hauser	Ford Mondeo Ghia	+13 laps	

Race 2

Pos	No	Driver	Constructor	Time/Retired	Points
1	45	(Germany) Frank Biela	Audi A4 Quattro	24 laps in 45:04.19	60
2	11	(Germany) Altfrid Heger	Audi A4 Quattro	+0.45s	50
3	2	(Italy) Roberto Ravaglia	BMW 318iS	+2.35s	40
4	9	(Netherlands) Peter Kox	BMW 318iS	+4.19s	34
5	8	(Germany) Joachim Winkelhock	BMW 318iS	+4.60s	32
6	44	(Germany) Hans Joachim Stuck	Audi A4 Quattro	+42.12s	30
7	23	(United Kingdom) Kieth O'Dor	Nissan Primera eGT	+1.01.46s	28
8	20	(Germany) Harald Grohs	BMW 318iS	+1.04.79s	26
9	22	(Germany) Sascha Maassen	Nissan Primera eGT	+1.28.25s	24
10	21	(Germany) Jorg Muller	BMW 318iS	+1.31.22s	22
11	4	(Italy) Tamara Vidali	Audi A4 Quattro	+1 lap	20
12	3	(Germany) Alexander Burgstaller	BMW 318iS	+1 lap	18
13	35	(Germany) Philipp Peter	Audi 80 Quattro	+1 lap	16
14	33	(Germany) Marc Gindorf	BMW 318iS	+1 lap	14
15	27	(Germany) Armin Bernhard	Nissan Primera eGT	+1 lap	12
16	19	(Czech Republic) Josef Venc	BMW 318iS	+1 lap	10
17	34	(Switzerland) Patrick Ulrich	BMW 318iS	+1 lap	8
18	31	(Germany) Rüdiger Julius	BMW 318iS	+2 laps	6
19	29	(Germany) Michael Heigert	BMW 318iS	+2 laps	4
20 DNF	14	(Germany) Klaus Niedzwiedz	Honda Accord	+5 laps	2
DNF	24	(Italy) Ivan Capelli	Nissan Primera eGT	+9 laps	
DNF	7	(Belgium) Thierry Boutsen	Ford Mondeo 4x4	+17 laps	
DNF	17	(Germany) Roland Asch	Ford Mondeo Ghia	+20 laps	
DNF	16	(Germany) Claudia Hürtgen	Ford Mondeo Ghia	+21 laps	
DNF	32	(Austria) Alexander Gaggl	BMW 318iS	+23 laps	
DNF	6	(Italy) Riccardo Patrese	Ford Mondeo 4x4	+24 laps	
DNS	12	(Germany) Armin Hahne	Honda Accord		
DNS	15	(Germany) Kris Nissen	Ford Mondeo 4x4		
DNS	18	(Switzerland) Johnny Hauser	Ford Mondeo Ghia		

=== Championship standings after Round 1 ===
Drivers' Championship standings

Pos	Driver	Points
1	(Germany) Frank Biela	80
2	(Germany) Altfrid Heger	68
3	(Italy) Roberto Ravaglia	56
4	(Germany) Hans Joachim Stuck	49
5	(Italy) Joachim Winkelhock	47

Constructors' Championship standings

Pos	Constructor	Points
1	(Germany) Audi	149
2	(Germany) BMW	105
3	(Japan) Nissan	74
4	(United States) Ford	14
5	(Japan) Honda	2

== Championship results ==
Points system
Race 1	1st	2nd	3rd	4th	5th	6th	7th	8th	9th	10th	11th	12th	13th	14th	15th	16th	17th	18th	19th	20th
	20	19	18	17	16	15	14	13	12	11	10	9	8	7	6	5	4	3	2	1
Race 2	1st	2nd	3rd	4th	5th	6th	7th	8th	9th	10th	11th	12th	13th	14th	15th	16th	17th	18th	19th	20th
	60	50	40	34	32	30	28	26	24	22	20	18	16	14	12	10	8	6	4	2

Pos	Driver	ZOL (Belgium)		SPA (Belgium)		ÖST (Austria)		HOC (Germany)		NÜR (Germany)		SAL (Austria)		AVU (Germany)		NÜR (Germany)		Pts
1	(Germany) Joachim Winkelhock	6	5	1	1	1	Ret	6	14	7	6	1	1	2	1	13	2	407
2	(Netherlands) Peter Kox	12	4	7	5	5	2	5	6	13	12	2	2	3	2	2	3	398
3	(Germany) Frank Biela	1	1	3	Ret	2	1	1	1	3	3	17	10	7	17†	Ret	5	391
4	(Germany) Hans-Joachim Stuck	2	6	4	2	6	Ret	3	2	4	4	9	9	15	5	5	6	354
5	(Germany) Altfrid Heger	3	2	5	6	7	15	2	4	11	7	7	17	8	4	17	7	315
6	(Italy) Roberto Ravaglia	5	3	2	4	4	4	9	8	5	Ret	3	3	6	11	8	Ret	310
7	(Germany) Alexander Burgstaller	7	12	DNS	17	10	5	Ret	9	2	1	4	6	4	3	10	Ret	281
8	(Germany) Roland Asch	Ret	Ret	9	12	9	8	NC	11	1	2	6	8	5	6	7	9	268
9	(Italy) Tamara Vidali	4	11	14	7	11	6	4	3	10	11	12	11	23	9	9	18	259
10	(United Kingdom) Kieth O'Dor	9	7	10	9	12	7	8	7	6	5	Ret	DNS	1	16†			225
11	(Germany) Armin Hahne	Ret	DNS	21	Ret	8	3	7	5	12	9	5	5	20	8	4	15	223
12	(Germany) Jörg Müller	13	10	6	3	13	Ret	11	Ret			10	12	16	19	11	20	149
13	(Germany) Klaus Niedzwiedz	24†	20†	DSQ	10	3	18†	Ret	13	9	10	8	4	Ret	Ret	22	Ret	145
14	(Germany) Sascha Maassen	23†	9	11	14	14	Ret	13	Ret	8	8	Ret	13	11	Ret			128
15	(Austria) Philipp Peter	8	13	15	11	21	12	16	Ret	16	21	18	19	13	Ret	15	12	122
16	(Italy) Emanuele Pirro													10	7	1	1	105
17	(Germany) Marc Gindorf	14	14	16	13	16	10	Ret	DNS	22	Ret	Ret	18	12	Ret	Ret	13	100
18	(Belgium) Thierry Boutsen	10	Ret	Ret	NC	22	Ret	NC	12	Ret	15	14	Ret	14	10	14	10	95
19	(Germany) Harald Grohs	19	8	8	8	18	11	Ret	DNS	19	20							94
20	(Switzerland) Johnny Hauser	Ret	DNS	13	21	17	Ret	10	10	23	17	13	14	9	14	Ret	DNS	94
21	(United Kingdom) Steve Soper											11	7	22	20	3	4	90
22	(Czech Republic) Josef Venc	15	16	12	15	24	14	12	15	20	Ret	21	21	DNS	DNS	Ret	DNS	73
23	(Austria) Alexander Gaggl	17	Ret	Ret	DNS	15	9	Ret	DNS	18	18	20	Ret	18	13	18	17	66
24	(Denmark) Kris Nissen	Ret	DNS									16	16	17	12	12	8	63
25	(Switzerland) Patrick Ulrich	21	17	18	18	20	13	Ret	17	17	Ret	Ret	Ret	21	15†	20	16	63
26	(Germany) Claudia Hürtgen	20	Ret	Ret	16	19	19†	Ret	DNS	14	16	15	15	19	Ret	Ret	DNS	54
27	(Germany) Rüdiger Julius	16	18	17	20	Ret	17	14	16	24	19	23	22	Ret	DNS			46
28	(Germany) Michael Heigert	Ret	19	20	19	23	16	15	Ret	26	Ret	Ret	DNS	Ret	18	Ret	DNS	28
29	(Italy) Ivan Capelli	11	Ret	Ret	DNS	Ret	DNS	Ret	DNS	Ret	14	22	20	Ret	Ret			26
30	(Germany) Marco Werner															16	11	25
31	(Australia) David Brabham									15	13							22
32	(Italy) Rinaldo Capello													Ret	Ret	6	19	19
33	(Italy) Enrico Bertaggia											19	Ret	Ret	DNS	21	14	16
34	(Germany) Armin Bernhard	22	15															12
35	(Italy) Riccardo Patrese	18	Ret			Ret	DNS	Ret	DNS	21	Ret	24	Ret	Ret	DNS	19	Ret	5
36	(Germany) Dirk Adorf			19	Ret													2
-	(Czech Republic) Miloš Bychl									25	Ret							0
-	(Germany) Klaus Panchyrz											DNS	DNS	DNS	DNS			0

† Drivers did not finish the race, but were classified as they completed over 90% of the race distance.

- Race 14: Half points awarded for 75% distance not completed

=== Manufacturers' Trophy ===
Pos	Manufacturer	Points
1	(Germany) BMW	945
2	(Germany) Audi	905
3	(United States) Ford	438
4	(Japan) Honda	367
5	(Japan) Nissan	365

=== Teams' Trophy ===
Pos	Team	Points
1	(Germany) BMW Team Schnitzer	487
2	(France) Roc Competition	482
3	(Germany) Azk Team Schneider	396
4	(Italy) BMW Team Bigazzi	384
5	(Switzerland) Mondeo Team Eggenberger	280
6	(Germany) Honda Team Linder	256
7	(Italy) Nissan Primera Racing	241
8	(Germany) BMW Team Isert	216
9	(Austria) Mig Motorsport	120
10	(Germany) AM Holzer Motorsport	110
