= 1996 Super Tourenwagen Cup =

Seasons
- ← 1995 1997 →

The 1996 D1 ADAC Super Tourenwagen Cup was the third season of the Super Tourenwagen Cup (STW).

== Season summary ==
The 1996 STW season was dominated by works Audi driver Emanuele Pirro, who won the majority of the races during the year. Briton Steve Soper was the only man to challenge him for the title, but a slow start to his championship hampered his title chase, and Pirro won the title at the penultimate racing weekend at the AVUS track. This was also Laurent Aïello and Peugeot's first season in the German championship, and while the Frenchman won several races he was too inconsistent to finish any higher than third.

== Teams and drivers ==
Team	Car	No.	Drivers	Rounds	Class
(Italy) BMW Team Bigazzi	BMW 320i	2	(United Kingdom) Steve Soper	All	
(Italy) BMW Team Bigazzi	BMW 320i	3	(Germany) Alexander Burgstaller	All	
(France) Roc Competition AZK (Note: Cars 4. and 7. were entered as ROC Competition/A.Z.K. while cars 5. and 6. were entered as A.Z.K./ROC Competition)	Audi A4 Quattro	4	(Italy) Tamara Vidali	All	
(France) AZK Roc Competition	Audi A4 Quattro	5	(Italy) Emanuele Pirro	All	
(France) AZK Roc Competition	Audi A4 Quattro	6	(Austria) Karl Wendlinger	All	
(France) Roc Competition AZK	Audi A4 Quattro	7	(Austria) Philipp Peter	All	
(Germany) Ford Mondeo Team Schübel	Ford Mondeo	8	(Germany) Roland Asch	All	
(Germany) Ford Mondeo Team Schübel	Ford Mondeo	9	(Belgium) Thierry Boutsen	1-2	
(France) Peugeot Esso	Peugeot 406	10	(France) Laurent Aïello	All	
(France) Peugeot Esso	Peugeot 406	11	(Germany) Altfrid Heger	All	
(Germany) Honda Team Linder	Honda Accord	12	(Germany) Armin Hahne	All	
(Germany) Honda Team Linder	Honda Accord	14	(Germany) Klaus Niedzwiedz	All	
(Germany) Alfa Team Engstler	Alfa Romeo 155 TS	15	(Germany) Franz Engstler	All	P
(Germany) Alfa Team Engstler	Alfa Romeo 155 TS	16	(Germany) Oliver Mayer	3-6, 8–9	P
(Germany) Alfa Team Engstler	Alfa Romeo 155 TS	16	(Germany) Stephen Vollmair	2	P
(Germany) Alfa Team Engstler	Alfa Romeo 155 TS	17	(Germany) Stephen Vollmair	7	P
(Germany) Abt Sportsline	Audi A4 Quattro	18	(Germany) Christian Abt	All	P
(Germany) Abt Sportsline	Audi A4 Quattro	19	(Denmark) Kris Nissen	All	P
MIG Austria	Audi A4 Quattro	20	(Austria) Ralf Kalaschek	All	P
(Italy) BMW Team Bigazzi	BMW 320i	21	(Germany) Jörg Müller	2-6	
(Italy) Nissan Primera Racing	Nissan Primera eGT	22	(Germany) Sascha Maassen	1-7, 9	
(Italy) Nissan Primera Racing	Nissan Primera eGT	23	(United Kingdom) Anthony Reid	1-7, 9	
(Italy) Nissan Primera Racing	Nissan Primera eGT	24	(Italy) Ivan Capelli	1-2, 6–7, 9	
(Germany) BMW Team Isert	BMW 318is	25	(Germany) Leopold Prinz von Bayern	1-3, 6–9	
(Germany) BMW Team Isert	BMW 318is	26	(Germany) Frank Krämer	5	
(Germany) Opel-Häusler Team Holzer	Opel Vectra 16v	27	(Germany) Marco Werner	All	P
(Germany) Opel-Häusler Team Holzer	Opel Vectra 16v	28	(Germany) Volker Strycek	7, 9	P
(Germany) Trans-Europe Racing Ltd. vs MHTsports	BMW 318is	29	(Germany) Michael Heigert	1-3	P
(Switzerland) Ulrich Motorsport	BMW 318is	30	(Switzerland) Patrick Ulrich	1, 3–4, 6–7, 9	P
(Germany) Team Lauderbach	BMW 318is	31	(Germany) Christian Menzel	8-9	P
(Germany) Team Lauderbach	BMW 318is	32	(Austria) Alexander Gaggl	1-4	P
(Germany) PMC Sports	BMW 318is	33	(Germany) Marc Gindorf	All	P
(Germany) Flash Power Wolf Racing	Ford Mondeo	35	(Austria) Wolfgang Treml	4-9	P
(Germany) Flash Power Wolf Racing	Ford Mondeo	36	(Germany) Claudia Hürtgen	4-9	P
(Germany) Mamerow Automobiltechnik	Audi 80 Competition	37	(Germany) Peter Mamerow	1, 3–4, 6–7, 9	P
(Germany) Ford Mondeo Team Schübel	Ford Mondeo	39	(United Kingdom) Warren Hughes	3-4, 6, 9	
(Italy) BMW Team Bigazzi	BMW 320i	40	(Venezuela) Johnny Cecotto	7-9	

Icon	Class
P	Private Drivers

== Race calendar and results ==
Round		Circuit	Date	Pole position	Winning driver	Winning team
1	R1	(Belgium) Zolder	5 May	(Italy) Emanuele Pirro	(Italy) Emanuele Pirro	A.Z.K./ROC Competition
1	R2	(Belgium) Zolder	5 May		(Italy) Emanuele Pirro	A.Z.K./ROC Competition
2	R1	(Netherlands) Assen	19 May	(United Kingdom) Steve Soper	(United Kingdom) Steve Soper	BMW Team Bigazzi
2	R2	(Netherlands) Assen	19 May		(France) Laurent Aïello	Peugeot Esso
3	R1	(Germany) Hockenheimring	2 June	(Austria) Philipp Peter	(Italy) Emanuele Pirro	A.Z.K./ROC Competition
3	R2	(Germany) Hockenheimring	2 June		(Italy) Emanuele Pirro	A.Z.K./ROC Competition
4	R1	(Germany) Sachsenring	30 June	(Austria) Philipp Peter	(Austria) Philipp Peter	A.Z.K./ROC Competition
4	R2	(Germany) Sachsenring	30 June		(Italy) Emanuele Pirro	A.Z.K./ROC Competition
5	R1	(Germany) Wunstorf	14 July	(United Kingdom) Steve Soper	(United Kingdom) Steve Soper	BMW Team Bigazzi
5	R2	(Germany) Wunstorf	14 July		(Italy) Emanuele Pirro	A.Z.K./ROC Competition
6	R1	(Germany) Zweibrücken	11 August	(France) Laurent Aïello	(France) Laurent Aïello	Peugeot Esso
6	R2	(Germany) Zweibrücken	11 August		(France) Laurent Aïello	Peugeot Esso
7	R1	(Austria) Salzburgring	25 August	(Germany) Armin Hahne	(United Kingdom) Steve Soper	BMW Team Bigazzi
7	R2	(Austria) Salzburgring	25 August		(Germany) Armin Hahne	Honda Team Linder
8	R1	(Germany) AVUS	8 September	(United Kingdom) Steve Soper	(Germany) Armin Hahne	Honda Team Linder
8	R2	(Germany) AVUS	8 September		(Italy) Emanuele Pirro	A.Z.K./ROC Competition
9	R1	(Germany) Nürburgring	22 September	(Venezuela) Johnny Cecotto	(Italy) Emanuele Pirro	A.Z.K./ROC Competition
9	R2	(Germany) Nürburgring	22 September		(Italy) Emanuele Pirro	A.Z.K./ROC Competition

== Championship Standings ==
Points system
Race 1	1st	2nd	3rd	4th	5th	6th	7th	8th	9th	10th	11th	12th	13th	14th	15th	16th	17th	18th	19th	20th
	30	24	20	17	16	15	14	13	12	11	10	9	8	7	6	5	4	3	2	1
Race 2	1st	2nd	3rd	4th	5th	6th	7th	8th	9th	10th	11th	12th	13th	14th	15th	16th	17th	18th	19th	20th
	60	48	40	34	32	30	28	26	24	22	20	18	16	14	12	10	8	6	4	2

=== Drivers' Championship ===
Pos	Driver	Car	ZOL (Belgium)		ASS (Netherlands)		HOC (Germany)		SAC (Germany)		WUN (Germany)		ZWE (Germany)		SAL (Austria)		AVU (Germany)		NÜR (Germany)		Pts
1	(Italy) Emanuele Pirro	Audi	1	1	3	2	1	1	3	1	2	1	2	3	8	10	4	1	1	1	678
2	(United Kingdom) Steve Soper	BMW	7	4	1	3	6	3	5	2	1	3	3	2	1	2	Ret	6	13	Ret	491
3	(France) Laurent Aïello	Peugeot	20	Ret	2	1	Ret	DNS	9	6	9	2	1	1	7	4	14	12	2	2	422
4	(Germany) Christian Abt	Audi	4	9	7	7	4	4	2	3	5	8	5	4	11	8	5	3	11	14	406
5	(Austria) Karl Wendlinger	Audi	5	Ret	5	5	3	2	4	4	3	4	7	Ret	12	13	6	5	10	5	366
6	(Germany) Armin Hahne	Honda	8	6	Ret	15	24	8	15	Ret	18	11	8	6	2	1	1	13	3	3	343
7	(Italy) Tamara Vidali	Audi	3	2	11	Ret	5	13	6	5	22	10	9	8	13	16	7	19	20	7	282
8	(Germany) Klaus Niedzwiedz	Honda	9	5	10	6	Ret	DNS	DNS	DNS	8	12	15	9	5	5	2	4	4	Ret	269
9	(Austria) Philipp Peter	Audi	2	14	6	21	2	Ret	1	19	12	6	4	17	10	11	Ret	Ret	5	4	256
10	(Germany) Marco Werner	Opel	Ret	DNS	Ret	9	11	9	8	7	6	5	Ret	Ret	Ret	DNS	3	8	9	6	234
11	(Germany) Altfrid Heger	Peugeot	10	Ret	13	Ret	10	6	14	11	4	17	12	7	4	Ret	Ret	10	12	8	223
12	(Austria) Ralf Kalaschek	Audi	23	7	15	12	16	5	10	10	14	Ret	13	18	16	14	8	11	15	12	219
13	(Denmark) Kris Nissen	Audi	6	3	8	8	7	Ret	23	DNS	10	Ret	11	5	14	12	Ret	17	7	Ret	214
14	(Germany) Roland Asch	Ford	12	Ret	12	10	14	10	12	14	13	13	Ret	Ret	Ret	9	9	9	19	16	188
15	(Germany) Alexander Burgstaller	BMW	24	DNS	9	17	8	7	7	8	16	9	6	Ret	Ret	DNS	Ret	7	18	21	176
16	(Germany) Sascha Maassen	Nissan	15	13	Ret	14	13	11	17	12	15	20	Ret	DNS	9	6			14	10	165
17	(Germany) Jörg Müller	BMW			4	4	9	14	18	9	11	7	Ret	16							165
18	(United Kingdom) Anthony Reid	Nissan	22	Ret	17	11	12	Ret	20	17	7	Ret	14	Ret	3	3			Ret	9	147
19	(Germany) Franz Engstler	Alfa Romeo	14	Ret	16	13	21	Ret	11	15	17	16	16	10	15	DNS	13	14	17	15	135
20	(Venezuela) Johnny Cecotto	BMW													6	7	11	2	6	Ret	116
21	(Germany) Marc Gindorf	BMW	16	8	20	18	18	Ret	16	Ret	DNS	DNS	17	11	17	19	10	Ret	23	DNS	93
22	(Germany) Claudia Hürtgen	Ford							13	13	20	15	18	12	Ret	DNS	15	16	24	17	82
23	(Germany) Peter Mamerow	Audi	18	11			23	12	19	16			19	13	20	18			DNS	DNS	78
24	(Germany) Leopold Prinz von Bayern	BMW	11	12	Ret	DSQ	15	Ret					Ret	DNS	18	15	Ret	15	22	18	67
25	(Italy) Ivan Capelli	Nissan	21	DNS	14	20							10	Ret	Ret	DNS			8	13	49
26	(Switzerland) Patrick Ulrich	BMW	19	15			20	16	22	18			Ret	14	Ret	DNS			28	20	47
27	(Austria) Alexander Gaggl	BMW	17	10	19	DSQ	17	15	Ret	DNS											44
28	(Austria) Wolfgang Treml	Ford							21	DNS	DSQ	19	Ret	15	19	17	17	20	27	DNS	32
29	(Germany) Volker Strycek	Opel													21	Ret			16	11	25
30	(Belgium) Thierry Boutsen	Ford	13	Ret	18	16															21
31	(Germany) Oliver Mayer	Alfa Romeo					22	Ret	DNS	DNS	21	18	Ret	DNS			16	18	25	19	21
32	(Germany) Frank Krämer	BMW									19	14									16
33	(Germany) Michael Heigert	BMW	Ret	Ret	21	19	Ret	Ret													12
34	(Germany) Christian Menzel	BMW															12	21	21	Ret	9
35	(United Kingdom) Warren Hughes	Ford					19	Ret	DNS	DNS			Ret	Ret					26	22	4
36	(Germany) Stephen Vollmair	Alfa Romeo			DNS	DNS									Ret	DNS					0
Pos	Driver	Car	ZOL (Belgium)		ASS (Netherlands)		HOC (Germany)		SAC (Germany)		WUN (Germany)		ZWE (Germany)		SAL (Austria)		AVU (Germany)		NÜR (Germany)		Pts

Colour	Result
Gold	Winner
Silver	Second place
Bronze	Third place
Green	Points classification
Blue	Non-points classification
Blue	Non-classified finish (NC)
Purple	Retired, not classified (Ret)
Red	Did not qualify (DNQ)
Red	Did not pre-qualify (DNPQ)
Black	Disqualified (DSQ)
White	Did not start (DNS)
White	Withdrew (WD)
White	Race cancelled (C)
Blank	Did not practice (DNP)
Blank	Did not arrive (DNA)
Blank	Excluded (EX)

=== Manufacturers' Trophy ===
Pos	Manufacturer	Points
1	(Germany) Audi	1192
2	(Germany) BMW	867
3	(France) Peugeot	645
4	(Japan) Honda	612
5	(Japan) Nissan	343
6	(United States) Ford	317
7	(Germany) Opel	259
8	(Italy) Alfa Romeo	156

=== Teams' Trophy ===
Pos	Team	Points
1	AZK Roc Competition	678
2	BMW Team Bigazzi	526
3	Peugeot Esso	485
4	ABT Sportsline	426
5	Honda Team Linder	402
6	Roc Competition AZK	370
7	Opel-Hausler Team Holzer	234
8	Nissan Primera Racing	156
9	Mig Austria	219
10	Ford Mondeo Team Schubel	188
