= 2000 Rose City Grand Prix =

Portland International Raceway

The 2000 DecisionPoint Applications Rose City Grand Prix was the eighth round of the 2000 American Le Mans Series season. It took place at Portland International Raceway, Oregon, on September 10, 2000.

== Official results ==
Class winners in bold.

Pos	Class	No	Team	Drivers	Chassis	Tyre	Laps
Pos	Class	No	Team	Drivers	Engine	Tyre	Laps
1	**LMP**	**77**	**(Germany) Audi Sport North America**	**(Italy) Rinaldo Capello (United Kingdom) Allan McNish**	**Audi R8**	**MI**	**136**
1	**LMP**	**77**	**(Germany) Audi Sport North America**	**(Italy) Rinaldo Capello (United Kingdom) Allan McNish**	**Audi 3.6L Turbo V8**	**MI**	**136**
2	LMP	1	(United States) Panoz Motor Sports	(Australia) David Brabham (Denmark) Jan Magnussen	Panoz LMP-1 Roadster-S	**MI**	136
2	LMP	1	(United States) Panoz Motor Sports	(Australia) David Brabham (Denmark) Jan Magnussen	Élan 6L8 6.0L V8	**MI**	136
3	LMP	42	(Germany) BMW Motorsport (Germany) Schnitzer Motorsport	(Germany) Jörg Müller (Finland) JJ Lehto	BMW V12 LMR	**MI**	135
3	LMP	42	(Germany) BMW Motorsport (Germany) Schnitzer Motorsport	(Germany) Jörg Müller (Finland) JJ Lehto	BMW S70 6.0L V12	**MI**	135
4	LMP	78	(Germany) Audi Sport North America	(Germany) Frank Biela (Italy) Emanuele Pirro	Audi R8	**MI**	135
4	LMP	78	(Germany) Audi Sport North America	(Germany) Frank Biela (Italy) Emanuele Pirro	Audi 3.6L Turbo V8	**MI**	135
5	LMP	36	(United States) Johansson-Matthews Racing	(Sweden) Stefan Johansson (United Kingdom) Guy Smith	Reynard 2KQ-LM	**Y**	135
5	LMP	36	(United States) Johansson-Matthews Racing	(Sweden) Stefan Johansson (United Kingdom) Guy Smith	Judd GV4 4.0L V10	**Y**	135
6	LMP	2	(United States) Panoz Motor Sports	(United States) Johnny O'Connell (Japan) Hiroki Katou	Panoz LMP-1 Roadster-S	**MI**	134
6	LMP	2	(United States) Panoz Motor Sports	(United States) Johnny O'Connell (Japan) Hiroki Katou	Élan 6L8 6.0L V8	**MI**	134
7	LMP	0	(Italy) Team Rafanelli SRL	(Italy) Mimmo Schiattarella (Belgium) Didier de Radigues	Lola B2K/10	**MI**	133
7	LMP	0	(Italy) Team Rafanelli SRL	(Italy) Mimmo Schiattarella (Belgium) Didier de Radigues	Judd (Rafanelli) GV4 4.0L V10	**MI**	133
8	LMP	19	(United States) Team Cadillac	(South Africa) Wayne Taylor (Italy) Max Angelelli	Cadillac Northstar LMP	**P**	133
8	LMP	19	(United States) Team Cadillac	(South Africa) Wayne Taylor (Italy) Max Angelelli	Cadillac Northstar 4.0L Turbo V8	**P**	133
9	LMP	37	(United States) Intersport Racing	(United States) Jon Field (United States) Rick Sutherland	Lola B2K/10	**Y**	127
9	LMP	37	(United States) Intersport Racing	(United States) Jon Field (United States) Rick Sutherland	Judd GV4 4.0L V10	**Y**	127
10	**GTS**	**91**	**(France) Viper Team Oreca**	**(Monaco) Olivier Beretta (Austria) Karl Wendlinger**	**Dodge Viper GTS-R**	**MI**	**123**
10	**GTS**	**91**	**(France) Viper Team Oreca**	**(Monaco) Olivier Beretta (Austria) Karl Wendlinger**	**Dodge 8.0L V10**	**MI**	**123**
11	**GT**	**51**	**(United States) Dick Barbour Racing**	**(Germany) Sascha Maassen (France) Bob Wollek**	**Porsche 911 GT3-R**	**MI**	**121**
11	**GT**	**51**	**(United States) Dick Barbour Racing**	**(Germany) Sascha Maassen (France) Bob Wollek**	**Porsche 3.6L Flat-6**	**MI**	**121**
12	GTS	92	(France) Viper Team Oreca	(United States) David Donohue (United States) Tommy Archer	Dodge Viper GTS-R	**MI**	121
12	GTS	92	(France) Viper Team Oreca	(United States) David Donohue (United States) Tommy Archer	Dodge 8.0L V10	**MI**	121
13	GT	7	(United States) Prototype Technology Group	(United States) Johannes van Overbeek (United States) Boris Said	BMW M3	**Y**	121
13	GT	7	(United States) Prototype Technology Group	(United States) Johannes van Overbeek (United States) Boris Said	BMW 3.2L I6	**Y**	121
14	GT	23	(United States) Alex Job Racing	(United States) Randy Pobst (Belgium) Bruno Lambert	Porsche 911 GT3-R	**MI**	120
14	GT	23	(United States) Alex Job Racing	(United States) Randy Pobst (Belgium) Bruno Lambert	Porsche 3.6L Flat-6	**MI**	120
15	GT	10	(United States) Prototype Technology Group	(United States) Brian Cunningham (Sweden) Niclas Jönsson	BMW M3	**Y**	119
15	GT	10	(United States) Prototype Technology Group	(United States) Brian Cunningham (Sweden) Niclas Jönsson	BMW 3.2L I6	**Y**	119
16	GT	70	(Australia) Skea Racing International	(United Kingdom) Johnny Mowlem (United States) David Murry	Porsche 911 GT3-R	**P**	118
16	GT	70	(Australia) Skea Racing International	(United Kingdom) Johnny Mowlem (United States) David Murry	Porsche 3.6L Flat-6	**P**	118
17	GT	30	(United States) White Lightning Racing	(United States) Wade Gaughran (United States) Robert Nagel	Porsche 911 GT3-R	**MI**	118
17	GT	30	(United States) White Lightning Racing	(United States) Wade Gaughran (United States) Robert Nagel	Porsche 3.6L Flat-6	**MI**	118
18	LMP	43	(Germany) BMW Motorsport (Germany) Schnitzer Motorsport	(France) Jean-Marc Gounon (United States) Bill Auberlen	BMW V12 LMR	**MI**	117
18	LMP	43	(Germany) BMW Motorsport (Germany) Schnitzer Motorsport	(France) Jean-Marc Gounon (United States) Bill Auberlen	BMW S70 6.0L V12	**MI**	117
19	GT	66	(United States) The Racer's Group	(United States) Kevin Buckler (United States) Philip Collin	Porsche 911 GT3-R	**P**	117
19	GT	66	(United States) The Racer's Group	(United States) Kevin Buckler (United States) Philip Collin	Porsche 3.6L Flat-6	**P**	117
20	LMP	24	(United States) Johansson-Matthews Racing	(United States) Jim Matthews (United States) Mark Simo	Reynard 2KQ-LM	**Y**	116
20	LMP	24	(United States) Johansson-Matthews Racing	(United States) Jim Matthews (United States) Mark Simo	Judd GV4 4.0L V10	**Y**	116
21	GT	15	(United States) Dick Barbour Racing	(United States) Terry Borcheller (United States) Jennifer Tumminelli (Mexico) Randy Wars	Porsche 911 GT3-R	**MI**	115
21	GT	15	(United States) Dick Barbour Racing	(United States) Terry Borcheller (United States) Jennifer Tumminelli (Mexico) Randy Wars	Porsche 3.6L Flat-6	**MI**	115
22	GT	22	(United States) Alex Job Racing	(United States) Kimberly Hiskey (United States) Doug Hebenthal	Porsche 911 GT3-R	**MI**	113
22	GT	22	(United States) Alex Job Racing	(United States) Kimberly Hiskey (United States) Doug Hebenthal	Porsche 3.6L Flat-6	**MI**	113
23	GT	21	(United States) MCR/Aspen Knolls	(United States) Shane Lewis (United States) Cort Wagner	Porsche 911 GT3-R	**P**	108
23	GT	21	(United States) MCR/Aspen Knolls	(United States) Shane Lewis (United States) Cort Wagner	Porsche 3.6L Flat-6	**P**	108
24	GTS	08	(United States) Roock Motorsport North America	(United States) Zak Brown (United States) Vic Rice (United States) Mike Fitzgerald	Porsche 911 GT2	**Y**	99
24	GTS	08	(United States) Roock Motorsport North America	(United States) Zak Brown (United States) Vic Rice (United States) Mike Fitzgerald	Porsche 3.8L Turbo Flat-6	**Y**	99
25	GT	5	(United States) Dick Barbour Racing	(Germany) Dirk Müller (Germany) Lucas Luhr	Porsche 911 GT3-R	**MI**	90
25	GT	5	(United States) Dick Barbour Racing	(Germany) Dirk Müller (Germany) Lucas Luhr	Porsche 3.6L Flat-6	**MI**	90
26 DNF	GT	71	(Australia) Skea Racing International	(Australia) Rohan Skea (United States) Doc Bundy (United Kingdom) Richard Dean	Porsche 911 GT3-R	**P**	43
26 DNF	GT	71	(Australia) Skea Racing International	(Australia) Rohan Skea (United States) Doc Bundy (United Kingdom) Richard Dean	Porsche 3.6L Flat-6	**P**	43
DNS	LMP	13	(United States) Phillips Motorsports	(United States) Mel Hawkins (United States) Steven Knight	Lola B2K/40	?	-
DNS	LMP	13	(United States) Phillips Motorsports	(United States) Mel Hawkins (United States) Steven Knight	Nissan (AER) VQL 3.0L V6	?	-

== Statistics ==
- Pole Position - #77 Audi Sport North America - 1:04.312
- Fastest Lap - #78 Audi Sport North America - 1:04.909
- Distance - 425.485 km
- Average Speed - 154.632 km/h

American Le Mans Series
Previous race: 2000 Grand Prix of Texas	2000 season	Next race: 2000 Petit Le Mans
