= Armin Hahne =

German racing driver (born 1955)

- Born: 10 September 1955 (age 71); Moers, North Rhine-Westphalia, Germany
- Relatives: Hubert Hahne (brother); Jörg van Ommen (nephew)

Armin Hahne (born 10 September 1955 in Moers, West Germany) is a German racing driver, best known for his exploits in touring car racing. The highpoint of his career was winning both the 1982 and 1983 Spa 24 Hours driving BMW's. Another highlight of his career was driving in the factory supported Tom Walkinshaw Racing run Jaguar Racing team racing the Jaguar XJS coupes. Hahne stayed with the team as they transitioned to Rover Vitesse. In 1991, he drove for one race in the British Touring Car Championship for BMW.

Later in his career, Hahne raced mostly on the Nürburgring Nordschleife, finishing second overall in 2008 in the Adac 24 hours, driving a Porsche 911 GT3-MR entered by Manthey Racing.

In 2011, Hahne won the second round of the VLN race series, co-driving a Mercedes-Benz SLS AMG GT3 entered by the Mamerow / Rowe Racing with Christian Mamerow.

Hahne also is the youngest brother of Formula One driver Hubert Hahne as well as the uncle of fellow racing driver Jörg van Ommen.

== Bathurst 1000 ==
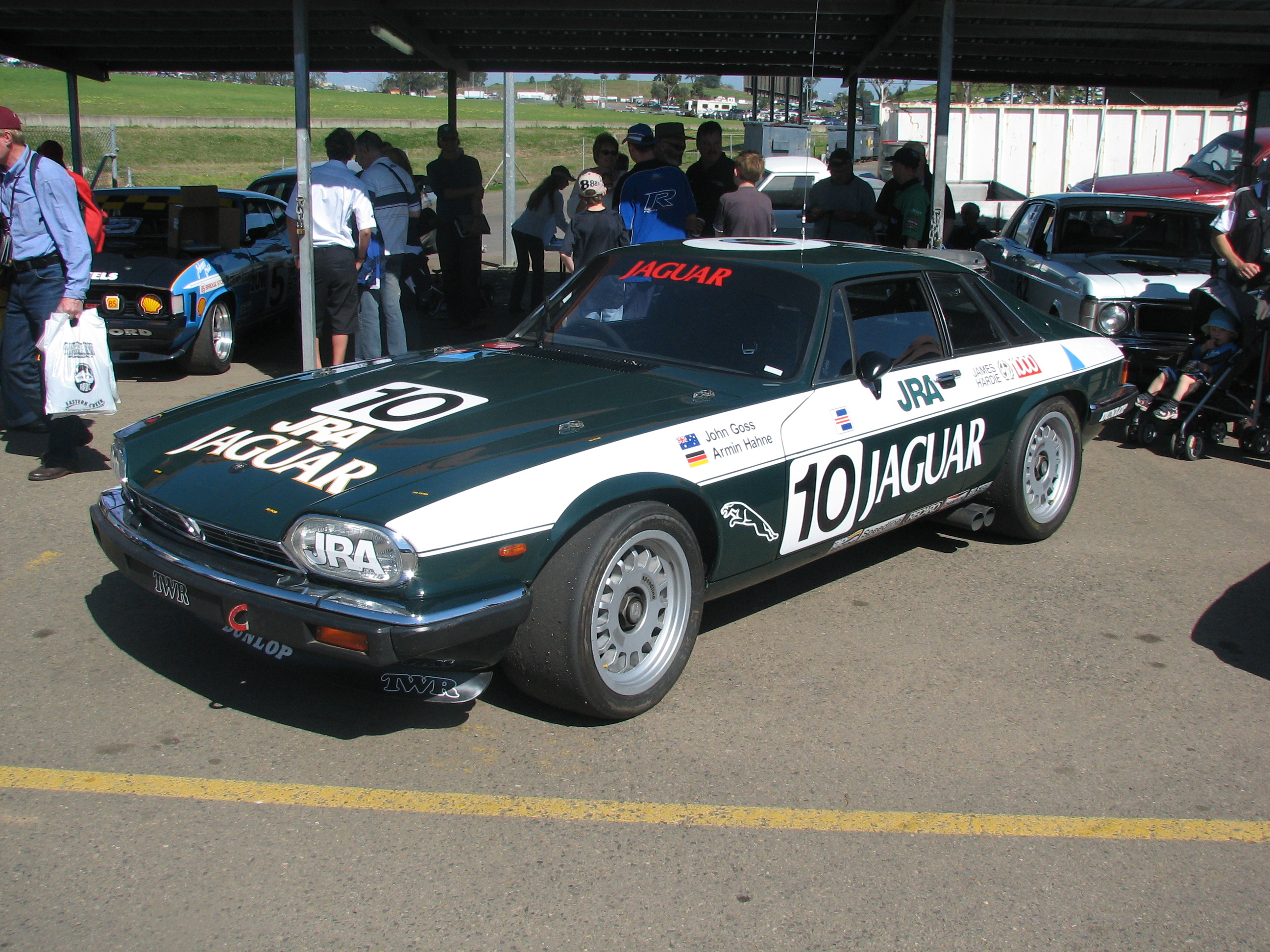
Replica of the Hahne/John Goss Jaguar XJ-S that won the 1985 James Hardie 1000

Hahne's first start in the Australian classic was in 1984 when he partnered Englishman Jeff Allam in a Mobil Rover Racing Rover Vitesse to an easy Group A class win and an excellent 12th outright after starting 36th against much more powerful opposition (the Rover qualified ten seconds slower than the pole winning Nissan Bluebird Turbo of George Fury and finished just 11 laps down on the winning V8 powered Holden VK Commodore of Peter Brock and Larry Perkins). A brief return to Jaguar in 1985 saw Hahne team with Australian racer John Goss to win the 1985 James Hardie 1000 after starting sixth. On the Bathurst podium, Hahne would call this his greatest win.

Hahne's next time at Bathurst was in 1987 for the World Touring Car Championship round in an ill-fated Maserati Biturbo with Australian Kevin Bartlett. A troubled race week saw them start 34th and retire after only 29 laps with a broken differential. 1988 saw him in a Mark Petch Motorsport Ford Sierra RS500 with New Zealand racer Robbie Francevic, the car engineered by its previous owner and Hahne's team boss in the 1988 ETCC, former Wolf Racing Formula One team owner Walter Wolf. Their strong charge finished on lap 103 due to overheating after they had been in either second or third place for the previous 70 laps. That was Hahne's last race in the Bathurst 1000.

== Racing career in Japan ==
Hahne has ample experience racing Japanese cars, including Honda, in touring car races and endurance races in Europe, including the 24 Hours of Le Mans. In Japan, he competed in the Inter TEC, the final round of the All Japan Touring Car Championship, in 1994, with Honda, and in 1999, with NISMO, in the All Japan GT Championship, as a substitute for his countryman Michael Krumm.

== Career results ==
Results sourced from Driver Database and History of Touring Car Racing.

Season	Series	Position	Car	Team
1976	Deutsche Rennsport Meisterschaft	38th	Ford Escort	Zakspeed
1977	Deutsche Rennsport Meisterschaft	15th	Ford Escort	Zakspeed
1978	Deutsche Rennsport Meisterschaft	9th	Ford Escort	Zakspeed
1979	European Formula Two Championship	NC	Maurer BMW	
1980	Deutsche Rennsport Meisterschaft	49th	BMW 320	
1982	World Sportscar Championship	55th	Mazda RX-7	Karl Heinz Becker
1984	Deutsche Tourenwagen Meisterschaft	31st	MG Metro Turbo	
1984	Australian Endurance Championship	63rd	Rover Vitesse	Mobil Rover Racing
1985	European Touring Car Championship	7th	Rover Vitesse	Tom Walkinshaw Racing
1985	Australian Endurance Championship	10th	Jaguar XJS	JRA Ltd / Jaguar Racing
1986	Nissan Mobil 500 Series	7th	Rover Vitesse	Tom Walkinshaw Racing
1986	European Touring Car Championship	11th	Rover Vitesse	Tom Walkinshaw Racing
1987	Nissan Mobil 500 Series	3rd	Rover Vitesse	Tom Walkinshaw Racing
1987	World Touring Car Championship	20th	Maserati Biturbo; Ford Sierra RS500	Pro Team Italia; Eggenberger Motorsport
1987	Deutsche Tourenwagen Meisterschaft	24th	Ford Sierra RS Cosworth	Wolf Racing
1988	European Touring Car Championship	34th	Ford Sierra RS500	Wolf Racing; Eggengerber Motorsport
1988	Deutsche Tourenwagen Meisterschaft	3rd	Ford Sierra RS500	Wolf Racing
1988	Asia-Pacific Touring Car Championship	NC	Ford Sierra RS500	Mark Petch Motorsport; Wolf Racing Australasia
1989	Deutsche Tourenwagen Meisterschaft	26th	Ford Sierra RS500	Wolf Racing
1990	Deutsche Tourenwagen Meisterschaft	12th	BMW M3 Evolution	Zakspeed
1990	Italian Superturismo Championship	21st	BMW M3 Evolution	Bigazzi M Team
1991	British Touring Car Championship	15th	BMW M3 Evolution	Team Labbat's Vic Lee Motorsport
1991	Deutsche Tourenwagen Meisterschaft	14th	BMW M3 Evolution	Zakspeed
1992	Deutsche Tourenwagen Meisterschaft	21st	BMW M3 Evolution	Linder
1993	ADAC GT Cup Class 1	3rd	Honda NSX	Seikel Motorsport
1993	Deutsche Tourenwagen Meisterschaft	20th	BMW M3 Evolution; BMW 318i	Linder
1994	ADAC GT Cup Class 1	2nd	Honda NSX	Kremer Racing
1994	All Japan Touring Car Championship	-	Honda Civic	Team Doricome
1995	FIA Touring Car World Cup	8th	Honda Accord	Honda Team Linder
1995	Deutscher Tourenwagen Cup	11th	Honda Accord	Honda Team Linder
1996	Super Tourenwagen Cup	6th	Honda Accord	Honda Team Linder
1998	Super Tourenwagen Cup	6th	Honda Accord	Honda Team Linder
1998	Super Tourenwagen Challenge	38th	Ford Escort RS2000	Wolf Ford Racing
1998	FIA GT Championship	14th	Porsche 911 GT1	Zakspeed
1999	All Japan GT Championship	-	Nissan Skyline GT-R	Nismo
2009	VLN Endurance	99th		
2010	VLN Endurance	43rd		

== Racing record ==
=== Complete European Formula Two Championship results ===
(key) (Races in bold indicate pole position) (Races in italics indicate fastest lap)

Year	Team	Car	1	2	3	4	5	6	7	8	9	10	11	12	DC	Pts
1979	MM Mampe Team	Maurer MM1-BMW	SIL	HOC	THU	NÜR; DNS	VAL; DNQ	MUG	PAU; DNQ	HOC; DNS	ZAN	PER	MIS; DNQ	DON; Ret	NC	0

=== Complete World Touring Car Championship results ===
(key) (Races in bold indicate pole position) (Races in italics indicate fastest lap)

Year	Team	Car	1	2	3	4	5	6	7	8	9	10	11	DC	Points
1987	(Italy) Pro Team Italia	Maserati Biturbo	MNZ ovr:17 cls:9	JAR	DIJ; Ret	NUR; Ret	SPA	BNO ovr:24 cls:5	SIL ovr:12 cls:4	BAT; Ret	CLD; Ret	WEL		20th	79
1987	(Switzerland) Eggenberger Motorsport	Ford Sierra RS500											FJI ovr:17 cls:10	20th	79

=== Complete British Touring Car Championship results ===
(key) (Races in bold indicate pole position) (Races in italics indicate fastest lap)

Year	Team	Car	1	2	3	4	5	6	7	8	9	10	11	12	13	14	15	DC	Pts
1991	BMW Team Labatt's	BMW M3	SIL	SNE	DON	THR	SIL	BRH	SIL	DON; 1	DON; 2	OUL	BRH; 1	BRH; 2	DON	THR; 3	SIL	15th	12

=== Complete Japanese Touring Car Championship (1994-) results ===
(key) (Races in bold indicate pole position) (Races in italics indicate fastest lap)

Year	Team	Car	1	2	3	4	5	6	7	8	9	10	11	12	13	14	15	16	17	18	DC	Pts
1994	Team Doricome	Honda Civic Ferio	AUT; 1	AUT; 2	SUG; 1	SUG; 2	TOK; 1	TOK; 2	SUZ; 1	SUZ; 2	MIN; 1	MIN; 2	AID; 1	AID; 2	TSU; 1	TSU; 2	SEN; 1	SEN; 2	FUJ; 1; 21	FUJ; 2; 15	NC	0

=== Complete Super Tourenwagen Cup results ===
(key) (Races in bold indicate pole position) (Races in italics indicate fastest lap)

Year	Team	Car	1	2	3	4	5	6	7	8	9	10	11	12	13	14	15	16	17	18	Pos.	Pts
1995	Honda Team Linder	Honda Accord	ZOL; 1 Ret	ZOL; 2 DNS	SPA; 1; 21	SPA; 2 Ret	ÖST; 1; 8	ÖST; 2; 3	HOC; 1; 7	HOC; 2; 5	NÜR; 1; 12	NÜR; 2; 9	SAL; 1; 5	SAL; 2; 5	AVU; 1; 20	AVU; 2; 8	NÜR; 1; 4	NÜR; 2; 15			11th	223
1996	Honda Team Linder	Honda Accord	ZOL; 1; 8	ZOL; 2; 6	ASS; 1 Ret	ASS; 2; 15	HOC; 1; 24	HOC; 2; 8	SAC; 1; 15	SAC; 2 Ret	WUN; 1; 18	WUN; 2; 11	ZWE; 1; 8	ZWE; 2; 6	SAL; 1; 2	SAL; 2; 1	AVU; 1; 1	AVU; 2; 13	NÜR; 1; 3	NÜR; 2; 3	6th	343

=== Complete All-Japan GT Championship results ===
(key) (Races in bold indicate pole position) (Races in italics indicate fastest lap)

Year	Team	Car	Class	1	2	3	4	5	6	7	DC	Pts
1999	Nismo	Nissan Skyline GT-R	GT500	SUZ	FUJ; 11	SUG	MIN	FUJ	TAI	MOT	NC	0

=== Complete Spa 24 Hour results ===
Year	Team	Co-drivers	Car	Class	Laps	Pos.	Class pos.
1980	BMW Belgium	(Belgium) Jean Wansart (Belgium) Claude De Wael	BMW 323i	-2500	391	15th	3rd
1982	(Belgium) Bastos Joosen Juma	(West Germany) Hans Heyer (Belgium) Eddy Joosen (Austria) Dieter Quester	BMW 528i	Div. 3	450	1st	1st
1983	(Belgium) Bastos Juma Racing Team	(Belgium) Thierry Tassin (West Germany) Hans Heyer	BMW 635 CSi	Div. 3	488	1st	1st
1984	(United Kingdom) Rover Gitanes	(France) Jean-Louis Schlesser (United Kingdom) Steve Soper	Rover Vitesse	Div. 3	NA	DNF	DNF
1985	(United Kingdom) Tom Walkinshaw Racing	(France) Jean-Louis Schlesser (United Kingdom) Jeff Allam	Rover Vitesse	Div. 3	33	DNF	DNF
1986	(United Kingdom) Tom Walkinshaw Racing	(United Kingdom) Jeff Allam (New Zealand) Denny Hulme	Rover Vitesse	Div. 3	481	6th	5th
1990	(Italy) Bastos Bigazzi	(United Kingdom) Steve Soper (Belgium) Jean-Michel Martin	BMW M3 Evolution	DTM/Div. 2	462	4th	3rd
1992	(Italy) BMW Fina Bastos Team/Bigazzi	(France) Bernard Béguin (Belgium) Eddy Joosen	BMW M3 Evolution	DTM	503	3rd	3rd
1993	(Germany) Seikel Motorsport	(Belgium) Bertrand Gachot (Japan) Kazuo Shimizu	Honda NSX	GT2	233	DNF	DNF

=== Complete 24 Hours of Le Mans results ===
Year	Team	Co-drivers	Car	Class	Laps	Pos.	Class pos.
1993	(United Kingdom) TWR Jaguar Racing	(United Kingdom) David Leslie (United Kingdom) Win Percy	Jaguar XJ220	GT	6	DNF	DNF
1994	(Germany) Kremer Honda Racing	(France) Christophe Bouchut (Belgium) Bertrand Gachot	Honda NSX	LMGT2	257	14th	6th
1995	(Japan) Honda Motor Co. Ltd.	(Italy) Ivan Capelli (Belgium) Bertrand Gachot	Honda NSX GT1	LMGT1	7	DNF	DNF
1997	(Germany) Schübel Engineering	(France) Patrice Goueslard (Portugal) Pedro Lamy	Porsche 911 GT1	LMGT1	331	5th	**3rd**

=== Complete Bathurst 1000 results ===
Year	Team	Co-drivers	Car	Class	Laps	Pos.	Class pos.
1984	(United Kingdom) Mobil Rover Racing	(United Kingdom) Jeff Allam	Rover Vitesse	Group A	152	12th	1st
1985	(United Kingdom) JRA Ltd / Jaguar Racing	(Australia) John Goss	Jaguar XJS	C	163	1st	1st
1987	(Italy) Pro Team Italia	(Australia) Kevin Bartlett (Italy) Bruno Giacomelli	Maserati Biturbo	A	29	DNF	DNF
1988	(New Zealand) Mark Petch Motorsport / Wolf Racing Australasia	(New Zealand) Robbie Francevic	Ford Sierra RS500	A	103	DNF	DNF

Sporting positions
Preceded by Tom Walkinshaw; Pierre Dieudonné	Winner of the Spa 24 Hours; 1982 & 1983 (with Hans Heyer, Eddy Joosen and Thierry Tassin)	Succeeded by Tom Walkinshaw; Hans Heyer; Win Percy
Preceded by Peter Brock; Larry Perkins	Winner of the Bathurst 1000; 1985 (with John Goss)	Succeeded by Allan Grice; Graeme Bailey
