= 1999 Monterey Sports Car Championships =

Track map of Laguna Seca Raceway

The 1999 Visa Sports Car Championships presented by Honda was the seventh round of the 1999 American Le Mans Series season. It took place at Laguna Seca Raceway, California, on October 10, 1999.

== Race results ==
Class winners in bold.

Pos	Class	No	Team	Drivers	Chassis	Tyre	Laps
Pos	Class	No	Team	Drivers	Engine	Tyre	Laps
1	**LMP**	**42**	**(Germany) BMW Motorsport (Germany) Schnitzer Motorsport**	**(Finland) JJ Lehto (United Kingdom) Steve Soper**	**BMW V12 LMR**	**M**	**121**
1	**LMP**	**42**	**(Germany) BMW Motorsport (Germany) Schnitzer Motorsport**	**(Finland) JJ Lehto (United Kingdom) Steve Soper**	**BMW S70 6.0 L V12**	**M**	**121**
2	LMP	2	(United States) Panoz Motor Sports	(United States) Johnny O'Connell (Denmark) Jan Magnussen	Panoz LMP-1 Roadster-S	**M**	121
2	LMP	2	(United States) Panoz Motor Sports	(United States) Johnny O'Connell (Denmark) Jan Magnussen	Ford (Élan-Yates) 6.0 L V8	**M**	121
3	LMP	43	(Germany) BMW Motorsport (Germany) Schnitzer Motorsport	(Germany) Joachim Winkelhock (United States) Bill Auberlen	BMW V12 LMR	**M**	121
3	LMP	43	(Germany) BMW Motorsport (Germany) Schnitzer Motorsport	(Germany) Joachim Winkelhock (United States) Bill Auberlen	BMW S70 6.0 L V12	**M**	121
4	LMP	36	(United States) Doran Lista Racing (United States) Jim Matthews Racing	(Sweden) Stefan Johansson (United States) Jim Matthews	Ferrari 333 SP	**M**	118
4	LMP	36	(United States) Doran Lista Racing (United States) Jim Matthews Racing	(Sweden) Stefan Johansson (United States) Jim Matthews	Ferrari F310E 4.0 L V12	**M**	118
5	LMP	16	(United States) Dyson Racing	(United States) Elliott Forbes-Robinson (United Kingdom) James Weaver	Riley & Scott Mk III	**G**	118
5	LMP	16	(United States) Dyson Racing	(United States) Elliott Forbes-Robinson (United Kingdom) James Weaver	Ford 5.0 L V8	**G**	118
6	LMP	12	(United States) Doyle-Risi Racing	(Italy) Alex Caffi (South Africa) Wayne Taylor	Ferrari 333 SP	**P**	117
6	LMP	12	(United States) Doyle-Risi Racing	(Italy) Alex Caffi (South Africa) Wayne Taylor	Ferrari F310E 4.0 L V12	**P**	117
7	LMP	8	(United States) Transatlantic Racing	(United States) Scott Schubot (United States) Butch Leitzinger	Riley & Scott Mk III	**G**	116
7	LMP	8	(United States) Transatlantic Racing	(United States) Scott Schubot (United States) Butch Leitzinger	Ford 5.0 L V8	**G**	116
8 DNF	LMP	1	(United States) Panoz Motor Sports	(Australia) David Brabham (France) Éric Bernard	Panoz LMP-1 Roadster-S	**M**	115
8 DNF	LMP	1	(United States) Panoz Motor Sports	(Australia) David Brabham (France) Éric Bernard	Ford (Élan-Yates) 6.0 L V8	**M**	115
9	LMP	00	(United Kingdom) Sintura Racing	(United Kingdom) Richard Dean (United Kingdom) Kurt Luby	Sintura S99	**D**	112
9	LMP	00	(United Kingdom) Sintura Racing	(United Kingdom) Richard Dean (United Kingdom) Kurt Luby	Judd GV4 4.0 L V10	**D**	112
10	LMP	15	(United States) Hybrid R&D	(United States) Chris Bingham (United States) Rick Sutherland	Riley & Scott Mk III	**Y**	111
10	LMP	15	(United States) Hybrid R&D	(United States) Chris Bingham (United States) Rick Sutherland	Ford 5.0 L V8	**Y**	111
11	**GTS**	**91**	**(France) Dodge Viper Team Oreca**	**(Monaco) Olivier Beretta (Austria) Karl Wendlinger**	**Dodge Viper GTS-R**	**M**	**110**
11	**GTS**	**91**	**(France) Dodge Viper Team Oreca**	**(Monaco) Olivier Beretta (Austria) Karl Wendlinger**	**Dodge 8.0 L V10**	**M**	**110**
12	GTS	3	(United States) Corvette Racing	(United States) Chris Kneifel (Canada) Ron Fellows	Chevrolet Corvette C5-R	**G**	109
12	GTS	3	(United States) Corvette Racing	(United States) Chris Kneifel (Canada) Ron Fellows	Chevrolet 7.0 L V8	**G**	109
13	LMP	27	(United States) Doran Lista Racing	(Belgium) Didier Theys (Italy) Mauro Baldi	Ferrari 333 SP	**M**	109
13	LMP	27	(United States) Doran Lista Racing	(Belgium) Didier Theys (Italy) Mauro Baldi	Ferrari F310E 4.0 L V12	**M**	109
14	GTS	56	(United States) Martin Snow Racing	(United States) Martin Snow (United States) Kelly Collins	Porsche 911 GT2	**M**	108
14	GTS	56	(United States) Martin Snow Racing	(United States) Martin Snow (United States) Kelly Collins	Porsche 3.6 L Turbo Flat-6	**M**	108
15	**GT**	**02**	**(United States) Reiser Callas Rennsport**	**(United Kingdom) Johnny Mowlem (United States) David Murry**	**Porsche 911 Carrera RSR**	**P**	**108**
15	**GT**	**02**	**(United States) Reiser Callas Rennsport**	**(United Kingdom) Johnny Mowlem (United States) David Murry**	**Porsche 3.8 L Flat-6**	**P**	**108**
16	GT	23	(Germany) Manthey Racing (United States) Alex Job Racing	(Germany) Dirk Müller (United States) Cort Wagner	Porsche 911 GT3-R	**M**	107
16	GT	23	(Germany) Manthey Racing (United States) Alex Job Racing	(Germany) Dirk Müller (United States) Cort Wagner	Porsche 3.6 L Flat-6	**M**	107
17	GTS	08	(United States) Roock Motorsport North America	(Germany) Claudia Hürtgen (Germany) André Ahrlé	Porsche 911 GT2	**Y**	107
17	GTS	08	(United States) Roock Motorsport North America	(Germany) Claudia Hürtgen (Germany) André Ahrlé	Porsche 3.8 L Turbo Flat-6	**Y**	107
18	LMP	28	(United States) Intersport Racing	(United States) Jon Field (United States) Paul Debban	Lola B98/10	**G**	106
18	LMP	28	(United States) Intersport Racing	(United States) Jon Field (United States) Paul Debban	Ford (Roush) 6.0 L V8	**G**	106
19	GTS	61	(Germany) Konrad Motorsport	(Belgium) Michel Neugarten (Italy) Simon Sobrero	Porsche 911 GT2	**D**	105
19	GTS	61	(Germany) Konrad Motorsport	(Belgium) Michel Neugarten (Italy) Simon Sobrero	Porsche 3.6 L Turbo Flat-6	**D**	105
20	GT	22	(United States) Alex Job Racing	(United States) Mike Fitzgerald (United States) Darryl Havens	Porsche 911 Carrera RSR	**Y**	103
20	GT	22	(United States) Alex Job Racing	(United States) Mike Fitzgerald (United States) Darryl Havens	Porsche 3.8 L Flat-6	**Y**	103
21	LMP	31	(United States) Nygmatech Motorsports	(United States) Stan Wattles (United States) Kurt Baumann	Riley & Scott Mk III	?	103
21	LMP	31	(United States) Nygmatech Motorsports	(United States) Stan Wattles (United States) Kurt Baumann	Ford 5.0 L V8	?	103
22 DNF	LMP	11	(United States) Doyle-Risi Racing	(Italy) Max Angelelli (Belgium) Didier de Radiguès	Ferrari 333 SP	**P**	102
22 DNF	LMP	11	(United States) Doyle-Risi Racing	(Italy) Max Angelelli (Belgium) Didier de Radiguès	Ferrari F310E 4.0 L V12	**P**	102
23	GT	03	(United States) Reiser Callas Rennsport	(United States) Grady Willingham (United States) Joel Reiser (United States) Craig Stanton	Porsche 911 Carrera RSR	**P**	101
23	GT	03	(United States) Reiser Callas Rennsport	(United States) Grady Willingham (United States) Joel Reiser (United States) Craig Stanton	Porsche 3.8 L Flat-6	**P**	101
24 DNF	GT	40	(United States) Team PRC	(United States) Mike Doolin (United States) Scott Peeler	Porsche 911 GT3 Cup	**G**	99
24 DNF	GT	40	(United States) Team PRC	(United States) Mike Doolin (United States) Scott Peeler	Porsche 3.6 L Flat-6	**G**	99
25	GT	53	(United States) White Lightning Racing	(United States) Dale White (United States) Michael Petersen	Porsche 911 Carrera RSR	**Y**	98
25	GT	53	(United States) White Lightning Racing	(United States) Dale White (United States) Michael Petersen	Porsche 3.8 L Flat-6	**Y**	98
26	GT	6	(United States) Prototype Technology Group	(United States) Boris Said (United States) Brian Cunningham (Germany) Hans-Joachim Stuck	BMW M3	**Y**	96
26	GT	6	(United States) Prototype Technology Group	(United States) Boris Said (United States) Brian Cunningham (Germany) Hans-Joachim Stuck	BMW 3.2 L I6	**Y**	96
27	GT	97	(United States) Millennium Motorsports	(United States) David Friedman (United States) Chris Miller	Porsche 911 Carrera RSR	?	93
27	GT	97	(United States) Millennium Motorsports	(United States) David Friedman (United States) Chris Miller	Porsche 3.8 L Flat-6	?	93
28	GTS	83	(United States) Chiefie Motorsports	(United States) Zak Brown (United States) Stephen Earle (Italy) Stefano Buttiero	Porsche 911 GT2	?	90
28	GTS	83	(United States) Chiefie Motorsports	(United States) Zak Brown (United States) Stephen Earle (Italy) Stefano Buttiero	Porsche 3.6 L Turbo Flat-6	?	90
29	GT	17	(United States) Contemporary Motorsports	(United States) Mike Conte (Belgium) Bruno Lambert	Porsche 911 Carrera RSR	?	88
29	GT	17	(United States) Contemporary Motorsports	(United States) Mike Conte (Belgium) Bruno Lambert	Porsche 3.8 L Flat-6	?	88
30	GT	10	(United States) Prototype Technology Group	(United States) Peter Cunningham (United States) Johannes van Overbeek	BMW M3	**Y**	87
30	GT	10	(United States) Prototype Technology Group	(United States) Peter Cunningham (United States) Johannes van Overbeek	BMW 3.2 L I6	**Y**	87
31	GTS	55	(United States) Saleen/Allen Speedlab	(United States) Terry Borcheller (United States) Ron Johnson	Saleen Mustang SR	**P**	84
31	GTS	55	(United States) Saleen/Allen Speedlab	(United States) Terry Borcheller (United States) Ron Johnson	Ford 8.0 L V8	**P**	84
32 DNF	GT	25	(Germany) RWS Motorsport	(Austria) Hans-Jörg Hofer (Germany) Sascha Maassen	Porsche 911 GT3-R	**M**	79
32 DNF	GT	25	(Germany) RWS Motorsport	(Austria) Hans-Jörg Hofer (Germany) Sascha Maassen	Porsche 3.6 L Flat-6	**M**	79
33 DNF	LMP	95	(United States) TRV Motorsport	(United States) Jeret Schroeder (United States) Tom Volk	Riley & Scott Mk III	**G**	70
33 DNF	LMP	95	(United States) TRV Motorsport	(United States) Jeret Schroeder (United States) Tom Volk	Chevrolet 6.0 L V8	**G**	70
34 DNF	LMP	0	(Italy) Team Rafanelli SRL	(Belgium) Eric van de Poele (Italy) Mimmo Schiattarella	Riley & Scott Mk III	**Y**	69
34 DNF	LMP	0	(Italy) Team Rafanelli SRL	(Belgium) Eric van de Poele (Italy) Mimmo Schiattarella	Judd GV4 4.0 L V10	**Y**	69
35 DNF	GTS	48	(Germany) Freisinger Motorsport	(Germany) Wolfgang Kaufmann (France) Bob Wollek	Porsche 911 GT2	**D**	67
35 DNF	GTS	48	(Germany) Freisinger Motorsport	(Germany) Wolfgang Kaufmann (France) Bob Wollek	Porsche 3.6 L Turbo Flat-6	**D**	67
36 DNF	LMP	38	(United States) Champion Racing	(United Kingdom) Allan McNish (Germany) Ralf Kelleners	Porsche 911 GT1 Evo	**M**	55
36 DNF	LMP	38	(United States) Champion Racing	(United Kingdom) Allan McNish (Germany) Ralf Kelleners	Porsche 3.2 L Turbo Flat-6	**M**	55
37 DNF	GT	7	(United States) Prototype Technology Group	(United States) Peter Cunningham (United States) Mark Simo	BMW M3	**Y**	51
37 DNF	GT	7	(United States) Prototype Technology Group	(United States) Peter Cunningham (United States) Mark Simo	BMW 3.2 L I6	**Y**	51
38 DNF	GT	65	(United States) Pregrid Motorsports	(United States) Randy Pobst (United States) John Brosius (United States) Jonathan Fay	Porsche 911 3.8 Cup	**Y**	51
38 DNF	GT	65	(United States) Pregrid Motorsports	(United States) Randy Pobst (United States) John Brosius (United States) Jonathan Fay	Porsche 3.8 L Flat-6	**Y**	51
39 DNF	LMP	29	(United States) Intersport Racing	(United States) Spencer Trenery (United States) Vic Rice	Riley & Scott Mk III	**G**	45
39 DNF	LMP	29	(United States) Intersport Racing	(United States) Spencer Trenery (United States) Vic Rice	Ford (Roush) 6.0 L V8	**G**	45
40 DNF	GT	68	(United States) The Racer's Group	(United States) Kevin Buckler (United States) Wade Gaughran	Porsche 911 Carrera RSR	**G**	44
40 DNF	GT	68	(United States) The Racer's Group	(United States) Kevin Buckler (United States) Wade Gaughran	Porsche 3.8 L Flat-6	**G**	44
41 DNF	GTS	92	(France) Dodge Viper Team Oreca	(United States) David Donohue (United States) Tommy Archer	Dodge Viper GTS-R	**M**	33
41 DNF	GTS	92	(France) Dodge Viper Team Oreca	(United States) David Donohue (United States) Tommy Archer	Dodge 8.0 L V10	**M**	33
42 DNF	GT	67	(United States) The Racer's Group	(United States) Kimberly Hiskey (United States) John Hill	Porsche 911 Carrera RSR	**G**	28
42 DNF	GT	67	(United States) The Racer's Group	(United States) Kimberly Hiskey (United States) John Hill	Porsche 3.8 L Flat-6	**G**	28
43 DNF	LMP	75	(France) DAMS	(France) Jean-Marc Gounon (France) Christophe Tinseau	Lola B98/10	**P**	1
43 DNF	LMP	75	(France) DAMS	(France) Jean-Marc Gounon (France) Christophe Tinseau	Judd GV4 4.0 L V10	**P**	1
DNS	GTS	52	(United States) Maxwell Racing	(United States) Harry Rady (United States) Cary Eisenlohr	Porsche 911 GT2	**Y**	-
DNS	GTS	52	(United States) Maxwell Racing	(United States) Harry Rady (United States) Cary Eisenlohr	Porsche 3.6 L Turbo Flat-6	**Y**	-

== Statistics ==
- Pole Position - #1 Panoz Motor Sports (Éric Bernard) - 1:15.974
- Fastest Lap - #1 Panoz Motor Sports (Éric Bernard) - 1:18.129
- Distance - 435.807 km (270.798 mi)
- Average Speed - 158.339 km/h (98.387 mph)

American Le Mans Series
Previous race: 1999 Petit Le Mans	1999 season	Next race: 1999 Grand Prix of Las Vegas
