= 1999 Petit Le Mans =

Sportscar endurance race in Georgia, US

The Track map of Road Atlanta

The 1999 Petit Le Mans was the second running of the Petit Le Mans and the sixth round of the 1999 American Le Mans Series season. It took place at Road Atlanta, Georgia, on September 18, 1999.

== Race results ==
Class winners in bold.

Pos	Class	No	Team	Drivers	Chassis	Tyre	Laps
Pos	Class	No	Team	Drivers	Engine	Tyre	Laps
1	**LMP**	**1**	**(United States) Panoz Motor Sports**	**(Australia) David Brabham (France) Éric Bernard (United Kingdom) Andy Wallace**	**Panoz LMP-1 Roadster-S**	**M**	**394**
1	**LMP**	**1**	**(United States) Panoz Motor Sports**	**(Australia) David Brabham (France) Éric Bernard (United Kingdom) Andy Wallace**	**Ford (Élan-Yates) 6.0 L V8**	**M**	**394**
2	LMP	43	(Germany) BMW Motorsport (Germany) Schnitzer Motorsport	(Germany) Joachim Winkelhock (United States) Bill Auberlen (United Kingdom) Steve Soper	BMW V12 LMR	**M**	393
2	LMP	43	(Germany) BMW Motorsport (Germany) Schnitzer Motorsport	(Germany) Joachim Winkelhock (United States) Bill Auberlen (United Kingdom) Steve Soper	BMW S70 6.0 L V12	**M**	393
3	LMP	42	(Germany) BMW Motorsport (Germany) Schnitzer Motorsport	(Finland) JJ Lehto (Germany) Jörg Müller	BMW V12 LMR	**M**	393
3	LMP	42	(Germany) BMW Motorsport (Germany) Schnitzer Motorsport	(Finland) JJ Lehto (Germany) Jörg Müller	BMW S70 6.0 L V12	**M**	393
4	LMP	20	(United States) Dyson Racing	(United States) Butch Leitzinger (United States) Elliott Forbes-Robinson (United Kingdom) James Weaver	Riley & Scott Mk III	**G**	384
4	LMP	20	(United States) Dyson Racing	(United States) Butch Leitzinger (United States) Elliott Forbes-Robinson (United Kingdom) James Weaver	Ford 5.0 L V8	**G**	384
5	LMP	2	(United States) Panoz Motor Sports	(United States) Johnny O'Connell (Denmark) Jan Magnussen (Mexico) Memo Gidley	Panoz LMP-1 Roadster-S	**M**	383
5	LMP	2	(United States) Panoz Motor Sports	(United States) Johnny O'Connell (Denmark) Jan Magnussen (Mexico) Memo Gidley	Ford (Élan-Yates) 6.0 L V8	**M**	383
6	LMP	0	(Italy) Team Rafanelli SRL	(Belgium) Eric van de Poele (Italy) Mimmo Schiattarella (Czech Republic) Tomáš Enge	Riley & Scott Mk III	**Y**	377
6	LMP	0	(Italy) Team Rafanelli SRL	(Belgium) Eric van de Poele (Italy) Mimmo Schiattarella (Czech Republic) Tomáš Enge	Judd GV4 4.0 L V10	**Y**	377
7	LMP	38	(United States) Champion Racing	(United Kingdom) Allan McNish (Germany) Ralf Kelleners (France) Bob Wollek	Porsche 911 GT1 Evo	**M**	372
7	LMP	38	(United States) Champion Racing	(United Kingdom) Allan McNish (Germany) Ralf Kelleners (France) Bob Wollek	Porsche 3.2 L Turbo Flat-6	**M**	372
8	LMP	27	(United States) Doran Lista Racing	(Belgium) Didier Theys (Switzerland) Fredy Lienhard (Sweden) Stanley Dickens	Ferrari 333 SP	**M**	369
8	LMP	27	(United States) Doran Lista Racing	(Belgium) Didier Theys (Switzerland) Fredy Lienhard (Sweden) Stanley Dickens	Ferrari F310E 4.0 L V12	**M**	369
9	**GTS**	**91**	**(France) Dodge Viper Team Oreca**	**(Monaco) Olivier Beretta (Austria) Karl Wendlinger (Belgium) Marc Duez**	**Dodge Viper GTS-R**	**M**	**357**
9	**GTS**	**91**	**(France) Dodge Viper Team Oreca**	**(Monaco) Olivier Beretta (Austria) Karl Wendlinger (Belgium) Marc Duez**	**Dodge 8.0 L V10**	**M**	**357**
10	GTS	92	(France) Dodge Viper Team Oreca	(United States) David Donohue (United States) Tommy Archer (France) Jean-Philippe Belloc	Dodge Viper GTS-R	**M**	357
10	GTS	92	(France) Dodge Viper Team Oreca	(United States) David Donohue (United States) Tommy Archer (France) Jean-Philippe Belloc	Dodge 8.0 L V10	**M**	357
11	LMP	13	(United States) J&P Motorsports	(Germany) Klaus Graf (Austria) Franz Konrad (Netherlands) Jan Lammers	Panoz LMP-1 Roadster-S	**M**	355
11	LMP	13	(United States) J&P Motorsports	(Germany) Klaus Graf (Austria) Franz Konrad (Netherlands) Jan Lammers	Ford (Élan-Yates) 6.0 L V8	**M**	355
12	GTS	93	(France) Dodge Viper Team Oreca	(United Kingdom) Justin Bell (Portugal) Ni Amorim (France) Emmanuel Clérico	Dodge Viper GTS-R	**M**	354
12	GTS	93	(France) Dodge Viper Team Oreca	(United Kingdom) Justin Bell (Portugal) Ni Amorim (France) Emmanuel Clérico	Dodge 8.0 L V10	**M**	354
13	GTS	4	(United States) Corvette Racing	(United States) Andy Pilgrim (United States) Kelly Collins (United States) Scott Sharp	Chevrolet Corvette C5-R	**G**	349
13	GTS	4	(United States) Corvette Racing	(United States) Andy Pilgrim (United States) Kelly Collins (United States) Scott Sharp	Chevrolet 6.0 L V8	**G**	349
14	GTS	3	(United States) Corvette Racing	(United States) Chris Kneifel (United States) John Paul Jr. (Canada) Ron Fellows	Chevrolet Corvette C5-R	**G**	347
14	GTS	3	(United States) Corvette Racing	(United States) Chris Kneifel (United States) John Paul Jr. (Canada) Ron Fellows	Chevrolet 6.0 L V8	**G**	347
15	**GT**	**23**	**(Germany) Manthey Racing (United States) Alex Job Racing**	**(Germany) Dirk Müller (Germany) Sascha Maassen (United States) Cort Wagner**	**Porsche 911 GT3-R**	**M**	**347**
15	**GT**	**23**	**(Germany) Manthey Racing (United States) Alex Job Racing**	**(Germany) Dirk Müller (Germany) Sascha Maassen (United States) Cort Wagner**	**Porsche 3.6 L Flat-6**	**M**	**347**
16	GT	6	(United States) Prototype Technology Group	(United States) Boris Said (Germany) Hans-Joachim Stuck	BMW M3	**Y**	344
16	GT	6	(United States) Prototype Technology Group	(United States) Boris Said (Germany) Hans-Joachim Stuck	BMW 3.2 L I6	**Y**	344
17	LMP	63	(United States) Downing Atlanta	(United States) Jim Downing (United States) Howard Katz (France) Franck Fréon	Kudzu DLY	**G**	344
17	LMP	63	(United States) Downing Atlanta	(United States) Jim Downing (United States) Howard Katz (France) Franck Fréon	Mazda R26B 2.6 L 4-Rotor	**G**	344
18	GT	7	(United States) Prototype Technology Group	(United States) Brian Cunningham (United States) Peter Cunningham (United States) Brian Simo	BMW M3	**Y**	339
18	GT	7	(United States) Prototype Technology Group	(United States) Brian Cunningham (United States) Peter Cunningham (United States) Brian Simo	BMW 3.2 L I6	**Y**	339
19	GT	10	(United States) Prototype Technology Group	(United States) Darren Law (United States) Johannes van Overbeek (United States) Mark Simo	BMW M3	**Y**	339
19	GT	10	(United States) Prototype Technology Group	(United States) Darren Law (United States) Johannes van Overbeek (United States) Mark Simo	BMW 3.2 L I6	**Y**	339
20	GT	17	(United States) Contemporary Motorsports	(United States) Mike Conte (Belgium) Bruno Lambert	Porsche 911 Carrera RSR	?	332
20	GT	17	(United States) Contemporary Motorsports	(United States) Mike Conte (Belgium) Bruno Lambert	Porsche 3.8 L Flat-6	?	332
21 DNF	LMP	8	(United States) Transatlantic Racing	(United States) Scott Schubot (United States) Henry Camferdam (United States) Rick Sutherland	Riley & Scott Mk III	**G**	322
21 DNF	LMP	8	(United States) Transatlantic Racing	(United States) Scott Schubot (United States) Henry Camferdam (United States) Rick Sutherland	Ford 5.0 L V8	**G**	322
22	GT	03	(United States) Reiser Callas Rennsport	(United States) Grady Willingham (United States) Joel Reiser (United States) Craig Stanton	Porsche 911 Carrera RSR	**P**	320
22	GT	03	(United States) Reiser Callas Rennsport	(United States) Grady Willingham (United States) Joel Reiser (United States) Craig Stanton	Porsche 3.8 L Flat-6	**P**	320
23	GTS	83	(United States) Chiefie Motorsports	(United States) Joe Foster (United States) Zak Brown (United States) Stephen Earle (United States) Michael Schrom	Porsche 911 GT2	**P**	319
23	GTS	83	(United States) Chiefie Motorsports	(United States) Joe Foster (United States) Zak Brown (United States) Stephen Earle (United States) Michael Schrom	Porsche 3.6 L Turbo Flat-6	**P**	319
24	GT	07	(United States) G & W Motorsports	(United States) Danny Marshall (United States) Steve Marshall (United States) Cindi Lux (United Kingdom) Chris Hall	Porsche 911 Carrera RSR	**P**	316
24	GT	07	(United States) G & W Motorsports	(United States) Danny Marshall (United States) Steve Marshall (United States) Cindi Lux (United Kingdom) Chris Hall	Porsche 3.8 L Flat-6	**P**	316
25	LMP	63	(United States) Downing Atlanta	(United States) Dennis Spencer (United States) Rich Grupp (United States) Barry Waddell	Kudzu DLM	**G**	313
25	LMP	63	(United States) Downing Atlanta	(United States) Dennis Spencer (United States) Rich Grupp (United States) Barry Waddell	Mazda 2.0 L 3-Rotor	**G**	313
26	GTS	08	(United States) Roock Motorsport North America	(Germany) Claudia Hürtgen (Germany) André Ahrlé (Germany) Hubert Haupt	Porsche 911 GT2	**Y**	312
26	GTS	08	(United States) Roock Motorsport North America	(Germany) Claudia Hürtgen (Germany) André Ahrlé (Germany) Hubert Haupt	Porsche 3.8 L Turbo Flat-6	**Y**	312
27	GT	25	(Germany) RWS Motorsport	(Austria) Hans-Jörg Hofer (Italy) Luca Riccitelli (Netherlands) Patrick Huisman	Porsche 911 GT3-R	**M**	305
27	GT	25	(Germany) RWS Motorsport	(Austria) Hans-Jörg Hofer (Italy) Luca Riccitelli (Netherlands) Patrick Huisman	Porsche 3.6 L Flat-6	**M**	305
28	GTS	49	(Germany) Freisinger Motorsport	(United States) Lance Stewart (Japan) Yukihiro Hane	Porsche 911 GT2	**D**	302
28	GTS	49	(Germany) Freisinger Motorsport	(United States) Lance Stewart (Japan) Yukihiro Hane	Porsche 3.6 L Turbo Flat-6	**D**	302
29	GTS	55	(United States) Saleen/Allen Speedlab	(United States) Terry Borcheller (United States) Ron Johnson (United States) Shane Lewis	Saleen Mustang SR	**P**	291
29	GTS	55	(United States) Saleen/Allen Speedlab	(United States) Terry Borcheller (United States) Ron Johnson (United States) Shane Lewis	Ford 8.0 L V8	**P**	291
30	LMP	31	(United States) Nygmatech Motorsports	(United States) Tony Kester (United States) Dave Dullum (United States) Kurt Baumann	Riley & Scott Mk III	?	279
30	LMP	31	(United States) Nygmatech Motorsports	(United States) Tony Kester (United States) Dave Dullum (United States) Kurt Baumann	Ford 5.0 L V8	?	279
31	LMP	29	(United States) Intersport Racing	(United States) Tim Hubman (United States) Vic Rice (United States) John Mirro	Riley & Scott Mk III	**G**	272
31	LMP	29	(United States) Intersport Racing	(United States) Tim Hubman (United States) Vic Rice (United States) John Mirro	Ford (Roush) 6.0 L V8	**G**	272
32	GT	96	(Germany) Freisinger Motorsport	(United States) John Heinricy (United States) Charles Coker (United States) Dave White	Porsche 911 Supercup	**D**	252
32	GT	96	(Germany) Freisinger Motorsport	(United States) John Heinricy (United States) Charles Coker (United States) Dave White	Porsche 3.6 L Flat-6	**D**	252
33 DNF	GT	76	(United States) Team ARE	(United States) Geoff Auberlen (Italy) Angelo Cilli (Italy) Simon Sobrero	Porsche 911 Carrera RSR	**Y**	243
33 DNF	GT	76	(United States) Team ARE	(United States) Geoff Auberlen (Italy) Angelo Cilli (Italy) Simon Sobrero	Porsche 3.8 L Flat-6	**Y**	243
34 DNF	LMP	36	(United States) Doran Lista Racing (United States) Jim Matthews Racing	(Sweden) Stefan Johansson (United States) Jim Matthews (New Zealand) Scott Dixon	Ferrari 333 SP	**M**	225
34 DNF	LMP	36	(United States) Doran Lista Racing (United States) Jim Matthews Racing	(Sweden) Stefan Johansson (United States) Jim Matthews (New Zealand) Scott Dixon	Ferrari F310E 4.0 L V12	**M**	225
35 DNF	GTS	48	(Germany) Freisinger Motorsport	(Germany) Wolfgang Kaufmann (France) Michel Ligonnet	Porsche 911 GT2	**D**	223
35 DNF	GTS	48	(Germany) Freisinger Motorsport	(Germany) Wolfgang Kaufmann (France) Michel Ligonnet	Porsche 3.6 L Turbo Flat-6	**D**	223
36 DNF	GTS	19	(United Kingdom) Chamberlain Motorsport	(Belgium) Didier Defourny (Netherlands) Hans Hugenholtz (Japan) Seiji Ara	Chrysler Viper GTS-R	**M**	222
36 DNF	GTS	19	(United Kingdom) Chamberlain Motorsport	(Belgium) Didier Defourny (Netherlands) Hans Hugenholtz (Japan) Seiji Ara	Chrysler 8.0 L V10	**M**	222
37 DNF	GTS	61	(Germany) Konrad Motorsport	(Belgium) Michel Neugarten (United States) Charles Slater (United States) Tom McGlynn	Porsche 911 GT2	**D**	214
37 DNF	GTS	61	(Germany) Konrad Motorsport	(Belgium) Michel Neugarten (United States) Charles Slater (United States) Tom McGlynn	Porsche 3.6 L Turbo Flat-6	**D**	214
38 DNF	LMP	75	(France) DAMS	(France) Jean-Marc Gounon (France) Franck Montagny (France) Christophe Tinseau	Lola B98/10	**P**	206
38 DNF	LMP	75	(France) DAMS	(France) Jean-Marc Gounon (France) Franck Montagny (France) Christophe Tinseau	Judd GV4 4.0 L V10	**P**	206
39 DNF	LMP	28	(United States) Intersport Racing	(United States) Jon Field (United States) Ryan Jones (Sweden) Niclas Jönsson	Lola B98/10	**G**	188
39 DNF	LMP	28	(United States) Intersport Racing	(United States) Jon Field (United States) Ryan Jones (Sweden) Niclas Jönsson	Ford (Roush) 6.0 L V8	**G**	188
40 DNF	LMP	11	(United States) Doyle-Risi Racing	(Italy) Max Angelelli (Belgium) Didier de Radiguès (France) Xavier Pompidou	Ferrari 333 SP	**P**	187
40 DNF	LMP	11	(United States) Doyle-Risi Racing	(Italy) Max Angelelli (Belgium) Didier de Radiguès (France) Xavier Pompidou	Ferrari F310E 4.0L V12	**P**	187
41 DNF	LMP	12	(United States) Doyle-Risi Racing	(Italy) Alex Caffi (Italy) Andrea Montermini (South Africa) Wayne Taylor	Ferrari 333 SP	**P**	172
41 DNF	LMP	12	(United States) Doyle-Risi Racing	(Italy) Alex Caffi (Italy) Andrea Montermini (South Africa) Wayne Taylor	Ferrari F310E 4.0 L V12	**P**	172
42 DNF	GT	73	(United States) Auto Sport South Racing	(United States) Brady Refenning (United States) Allan Ziegelman (United States) Kevin Wheeler (United States) Paulo Lima	Porsche 911 Carrera RSR	**G**	165
42 DNF	GT	73	(United States) Auto Sport South Racing	(United States) Brady Refenning (United States) Allan Ziegelman (United States) Kevin Wheeler (United States) Paulo Lima	Porsche 3.8 L Flat-6	**G**	165
43 DNF	GT	70	(United States) Alegra Motorsports	(United States) Scooter Gabel (United States) Carlos DeQuesada	Porsche 911 Carrera RSR	**P**	157
43 DNF	GT	70	(United States) Alegra Motorsports	(United States) Scooter Gabel (United States) Carlos DeQuesada	Porsche 3.8 L Flat-6	**P**	157
44 DNF	GT	02	(United States) Reiser Callas Rennsport	(United Kingdom) Johnny Mowlem (United States) David Murry (United States) Hurley Haywood	Porsche 911 Carrera RSR	**P**	147
44 DNF	GT	02	(United States) Reiser Callas Rennsport	(United Kingdom) Johnny Mowlem (United States) David Murry (United States) Hurley Haywood	Porsche 3.8 L Flat-6	**P**	147
45 DNF	LMP	74	(United States) Robinson Racing	(United States) George Robinson (United States) Jack Baldwin (United States) Irv Hoerr	Riley & Scott Mk III	**G**	118
45 DNF	LMP	74	(United States) Robinson Racing	(United States) George Robinson (United States) Jack Baldwin (United States) Irv Hoerr	Chevrolet 6.0 L V8	**G**	118
46 DNF	GTS	56	(United States) Martin Snow Racing	(United States) Martin Snow (United States) Larry Schumacher (United States) John O'Steen	Porsche 911 GT2	**M**	115
46 DNF	GTS	56	(United States) Martin Snow Racing	(United States) Martin Snow (United States) Larry Schumacher (United States) John O'Steen	Porsche 3.6 L Turbo Flat-6	**M**	115
47 DNF	GT	22	(United States) Alex Job Racing	(United States) Mike Fitzgerald (United States) Darryl Havens (United States) Randy Pobst	Porsche 911 Carrera RSR	**Y**	113
47 DNF	GT	22	(United States) Alex Job Racing	(United States) Mike Fitzgerald (United States) Darryl Havens (United States) Randy Pobst	Porsche 3.8L Flat-6	**Y**	113
48 DNF	LMP	95	(United States) TRV Motorsport	(United States) Jeret Schroeder (United States) Tom Volk (United States) Lyn St. James	Riley & Scott Mk III	**G**	66
48 DNF	LMP	95	(United States) TRV Motorsport	(United States) Jeret Schroeder (United States) Tom Volk (United States) Lyn St. James	Chevrolet 6.0 L V8	**G**	66
49 DNF	GT	64	(United States) Spencer Pumpelly Racing	(United States) Spencer Pumpelly (United States) Jack Lewis (United States) Kurt Mathewson	Porsche 911 Carrera RSR	?	7
49 DNF	GT	64	(United States) Spencer Pumpelly Racing	(United States) Spencer Pumpelly (United States) Jack Lewis (United States) Kurt Mathewson	Porsche 3.8 L Flat-6	?	7
DNS	LMP	06	(Canada) Multimatic Motorsports	(Canada) Scott Maxwell (Finland) Harri Toivonen	Lola B98/10	**P**	-
DNS	LMP	06	(Canada) Multimatic Motorsports	(Canada) Scott Maxwell (Finland) Harri Toivonen	Ford 5.1 L V8	**P**	-

== Statistics ==
- Pole Position - #1 Panoz Motor Sports (David Brabham) - 1:10.873
- Fastest Lap - #42 BMW Motorsport (J.J. Lehto) - 1:12.653
- Distance - 1,610.567 km (1,000.760 mi)
- Average Speed - 180.108 km/h (111.914 mph)

American Le Mans Series
Previous race: 1999 Rose City Grand Prix	1999 season	Next race: 1999 Monterey Sports Car Championships
