= Tim Harvey =

British former racing driver and commentator (born 1961)

- Harvey in 2006
- Nationality: (United Kingdom) British
- Born: Timothy James Harvey; 20 November 1961 (age 64) Farnborough, Kent, England
- Categorisation: FIA Silver (until 2021); FIA Bronze (2022–)

Previous series
- 1987-2001: British Touring Car Championship

Timothy James Harvey (born 20 November 1961) is a British former racing driver and commentator who currently serves as a commentator for the ITV4/ITV Sport coverage of the British Touring Car Championship. Harvey is best known for being the 1992 British Touring Car Champion, and the 2008 and 2010 Porsche Carrera Cup Great Britain champion.

A household name in the 1990s, Harvey won sixteen races in the British Touring Car Championship between 1987 and 1995, and competed in the series until 2002. He was also the winner of the invitational Guia Race of Macau touring car event, in 1989.

After leaving touring car racing, Harvey moved into the one-make Porsche Carrera Cup Great Britain series; after two guest drives in 2003, including one victory, Harvey competed full-time from the 2004 season onwards. In seven full seasons in the championship, Harvey finished in the top four of the final championship standings in each season, and left the series after a class victory in the Porsche Carrera World Cup meeting at the Nürburgring, with a series record of 35 overall victories. Harvey formerly competed in the British GT Championship; sharing a Porsche with Jon Minshaw, for the Trackspeed team.

== Early career ==
Harvey started racing in Formula Ford 1600 in 1983.

In 1984 and 1985, Harvey raced in the MG Metro Challenge. This led to him making his Touring car racing debut in the 1984 Tourist Trophy race at Silverstone, sharing an MG Metro Turbo with Robin Brundle and Patrick Watts. A rear axle failure forced them to retire.

A Formula Ford crash at Silverstone in 1986 left Harvey with limited movement in his ankles and unable to continue racing in single-seaters.

This prompted a switch to tin-tops, starting with a one-off Production Saloon outing at Brands Hatch in a Rover Vitesse.

== BTCC career ==
Born in Farnborough, London, Harvey first raced in the BTCC in 1987, taking three Class A wins in a Rover Vitesse In 1988 and 1989 he dovetailed sports car racing with BTCC outings, before finishing third in Class A in 1989 and 1990.

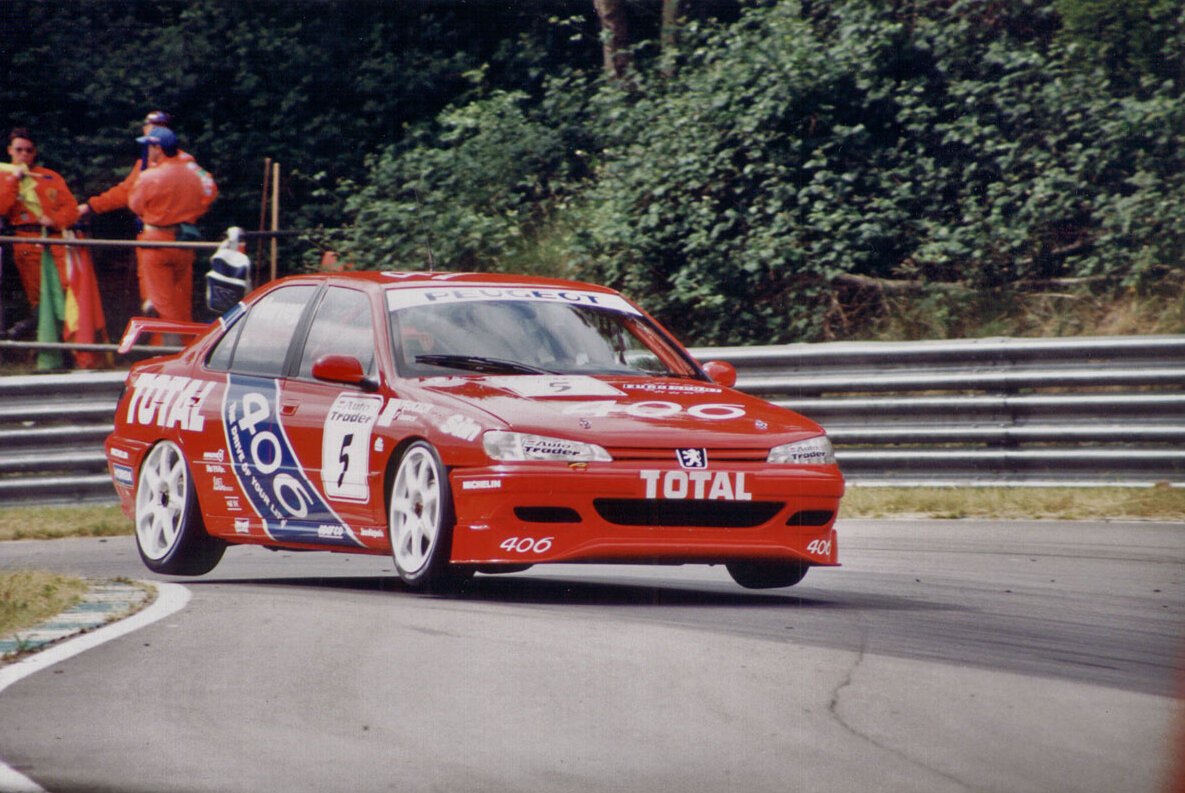
Harvey driving a Peugeot 406 in the 1996 British Touring Car Championship season.

Harvey was eighth overall in 1991. His 1992 title was achieved while driving a BMW 318 coupe, run by Vic Lee Motorsport. He won five of the last seven races, having previously only won once. A dramatic final race saw him beat John Cleland and reigning champion Will Hoy to the title, after Hoy suffered an engine failure and Cleland clashed with Harvey's team-mate Steve Soper. He had a difficult 1993 season developing the Renault 19 for the new Renault entry but still managed to win the European Grand Prix support race in lurid conditions, while he was outpaced by team-mate Alain Menu in 1994 in the new Laguna. He raced for Volvo in 1995, using his wealth of experience to develop the all new Volvo 850 saloon, finishing fifth overall and taking two wins but generally unable to match team-mate Rickard Rydell. His experience was then used to develop the new Peugeot 406, signing with the French marque in 1996 but was unable to deliver the win that eluded Peugeot during the heyday of the supertouring years. He drove for Peugeot in the 1996, 1997 and 1998 seasons, his best year being 1997, where he finished ninth in the championship, which included two second-place finishes, and strong drives in the wet at Thruxton.

After a couple of years away, Harvey's last BTCC years were 2001 (eighth overall in a JSM Alfa Romeo) and tenth in 2002 (reuniting with Vic Lee to drive one of his Peugeots, before quitting the series to pursue a media career). The Alfa Romeo 147 that Harvey raced is now owned by Allitalia – an Independent Italian Auto Specialist based in North Wales.

== Porsche Carrera Cup ==
Harvey has raced in the Porsche Carrera Cup for several years, finishing second to Richard Westbrook in 2004 and Damien Faulkner in 2006. In 2007, Harvey drove for Redline Racing in the new 997 Porsche GT3 in the British edition of the Carrera Cup. With stars such as Faulkner, Westbrook, Danny Watts and Richard Williams no longer competing, and Harvey now in the top team of 2006, he started as title favourite, but finished up second again, by just four points behind James Sutton.

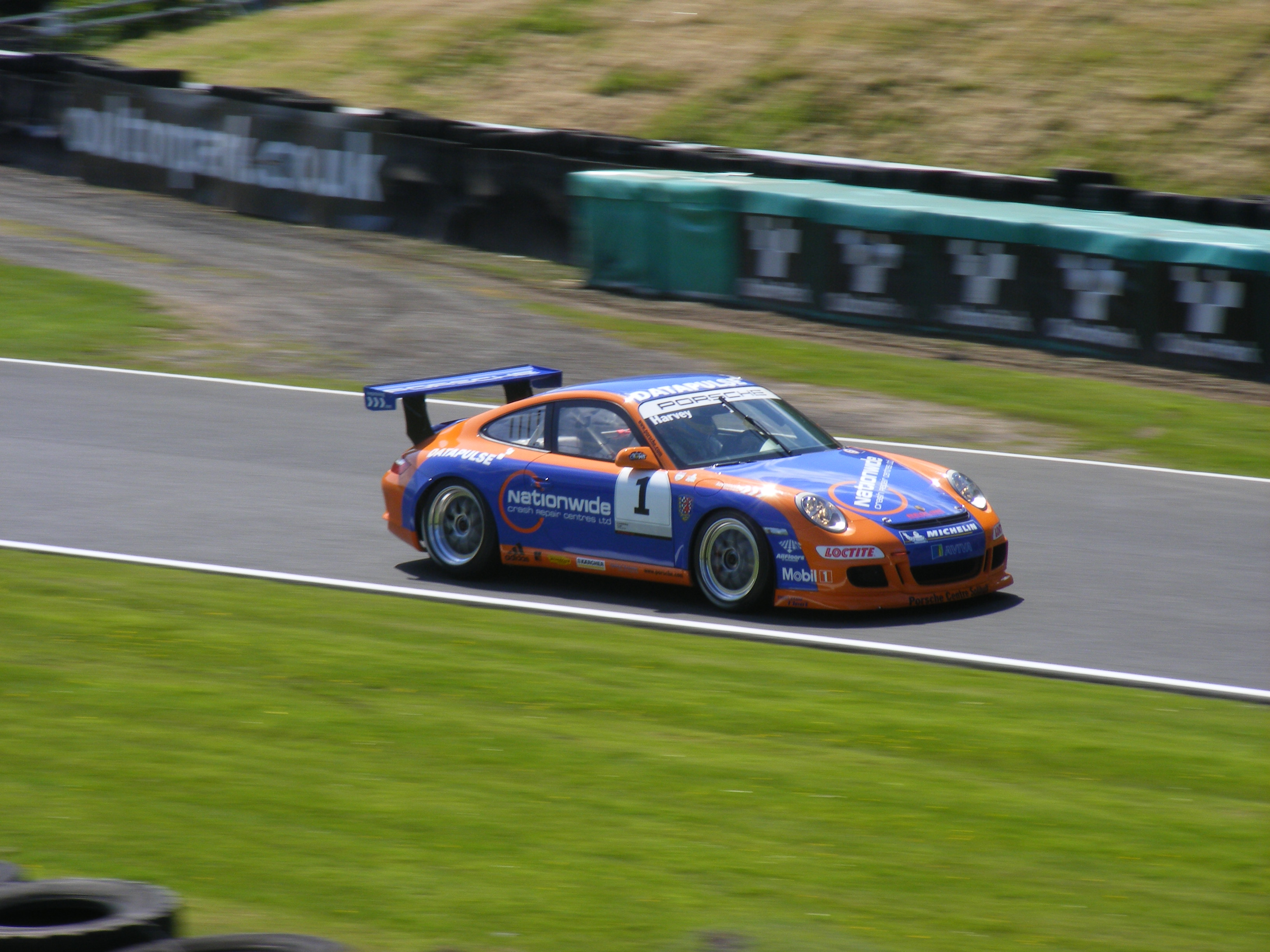
Harvey competing at Oulton Park during the 2009 Porsche Carrera Cup GB season.

In 2008, Harvey continued to battle for the title, making his 100th series start (from just 106 races in total). He won the Porsche Carrera Cup Drivers Championship, on 21 September at Brands Hatch. He holds series records for podium finishes and fastest laps. He finished third in 2009, taking his first win of the year in race 6 at Thruxton and a double win at Snetterton. He then opened 2010 with nine wins in the first ten races (by contrast, he took four wins en route to the 2008 title). He wrapped up the 2010 title with one race to spare at Brands Hatch on 9 October with a second-place finish behind Stephen Jelley to ensure that he could not be caught by championship runner up Michael Caine. Following a puncture in race 20 which saw Harvey fail to score points for the first time in the season, Harvey claimed the 2010 Porsche Carrera Cup GB Championship by ten points, with 11 race wins (vs. Caine's seven). Harvey's two wins at Croft on 20 June saw him become the most successful driver in the history of the championship, with 33 race wins at the time (beating Richard Westbrook's 31 wins). He would end the season 4 clear, with 35 wins, and over 150 podiums.

At the end of May 2011, Harvey announced he was quitting the championship with immediate effect, citing difficulty in adapting to regulation changes as his motivation and allowing up and coming Kieran Vernon the opportunity to benefit from his seat in the Motorbase Performance car. He explained during the ITV4 coverage of the Oulton Park BTCC round on 5 June 2011 that he was not entirely retiring from racing and would be reappearing somewhere before long whilst continuing to commentate for ITV.

In what may have been his last Porsche race, Harvey won the Porsche Carrera Cup GB race held at a wet Nürburgring in Germany as part of the Porsche Carrera World Cup. Harvey finished 13th overall, ahead of a number of the faster Supercup models.

== Other racing ==
A factory driver for Spice in the halcyon days of the World Sportscar Championship saw Tim battling the Jaguars and Mercedes Benz during the 1989 and 1990 seasons. He twice won the BRDC C2 Championship in 1988 and 1989. He has also contested the 24 Hours of Le Mans four times, winning his class in 1987. In June 1993, he made a one-off appearance in the TVR Tuscan Challenge at Oulton Park and won. He won the British Sports Car Championship in 1999.

Harvey is a double winner of the Oulton Park Gold Cup in 2000 and 2001, joining previous winners Stirling Moss, Jim Clark, Jackie Stewart and many others. Tim has made sporadic albeit successful outings in the British GT Championship, winning alongside various drivers in 2004 and 2005.

Harvey has also been a Touring car winner internationally, coming first in the Macau Grand Prix street race in 1989 and the Wellington International in 1994. He has successfully raced in Japan, Australia, South Africa and all over Europe.

On 19 June 2011, Harvey won a Round of the Ginetta GT Supercup at Croft.

Harvey also competes occasionally in enduro events on a motorcycle.

== Other work ==
Aside from his racing, Harvey combines his commentary and presenting work for ITV and Motors TV with various other motorsport roles, including acting as driver coach for many up and coming young British drivers. He has also coached the Oxford University Motor Drivers Club to success in the British Universities Karting Championship.

In 2008, Harvey was appointed Director of the British Racing Drivers' Club (BRDC) SuperStars program, designed to support the most promising young British drivers both financially and in an advisory role.

In 2021, Harvey appeared at an event in his hometown at Motorsport UK's new HQ to talk with Jason Plato, Matt Neal and the former's Fuelling Around co-host Dave Vitty.

== Racing record ==
=== Complete European Touring Car Championship results ===
(key) (Races in bold indicate pole position) (Races in italics indicate fastest lap)

Year	Team	Car	1	2	3	4	5	6	7	8	9	10	11	12	DC	Pts
1984	(United Kingdom) **Computervision Racing with Esso**	MG Metro Turbo	MNZ	VAL	DON	PER	BRN	ZEL	SAL	NUR	SPA	SIL; Ret	ZOL	MUG	NC	0
1988	(United Kingdom) **John Maguire Racing**	BMW M3	MNZ	DON	EST	JAR	DIJ	VAL	NÜR	SPA	ZOL	SIL; Ret	NOG		NC	0

=== Complete British Touring Car Championship results ===
(key) Races in bold indicate pole position (1 point awarded all races 1996 onwards) Races in italics indicate fastest lap (1 point awarded – 1987–1990, 2001 onwards, 1987–1990 in class) (* signifies that driver lead feature race for at least one lap – 1 point awarded 1998 onwards)

Year	Team	Car	Class	1	2	3	4	5	6	7	8	9	10	11	12	13	14	15	16	17	18	19	20	21	22	23	24	25	26	Pen.	Overall DC	Pts	Class
1987	John Maguire Racing	Rover Vitesse	A	SIL; Ret	OUL ovr:1 cls:1	THR; Ret	THR ovr:2 cls:2	SIL ovr:1 cls:1	SIL ovr:5 cls:4	BRH ovr:1 cls:1	SNE; Ret	DON; Ret	OUL; NC	DON ovr:4 cls:3	SIL ovr:3 cls:3																4th	45	**1st**
1988	Terry Drury Racing	Ford Sierra RS500	A	SIL; Ret	OUL ovr:4 cls:4	THR ovr:9 cls:5		THR ovr:5 cls:5	SIL ovr:6 cls:6	SIL ovr:7 cls:7	BRH; Ret	SNE ovr:7 cls:7	BRH ovr:2 cls:2	BIR; C	DON; Ret	SIL ovr:2 cls:2															11th	26	4th
1988	CAM Shipping	Ford Sierra RS500	A				DON ovr:2‡ cls:2‡																								11th	26	4th
1989	Labatt's Team	Ford Sierra RS500	A	OUL ovr:2 cls:2	SIL ovr:16 cls:14	THR ovr:1 cls:1	DON ovr:3 cls:3	THR ovr:2 cls:2	SIL ovr:2 cls:2	SIL ovr:4 cls:4	BRH; Ret	SNE ovr:3 cls:3	BRH	BIR ovr:2 cls:2	DON ovr:1 cls:1	SIL ovr:2 cls:2															7th	56	**3rd**
1990	Labatt's Team	Ford Sierra RS500	A	OUL ovr:4 cls:4	DON; Ret	THR ovr:2 cls:2	SIL; Ret	OUL ovr:3 cls:3	SIL ovr:3 cls:3	BRH ovr:2 cls:2	SNE ovr:2 cls:2	BRH ovr:3 cls:3	BIR ovr:4 cls:4	DON ovr:3 cls:3	THR ovr:2 cls:2	**SIL** ovr:15 cls:7															4th	132	**3rd**
1991	BMW Team Labatt's	BMW M3		SIL; 10	SNE; 7	DON; DSQ	THR; 4	SIL; 7^{1}	BRH; 4	SIL; 3	DON; 1 Ret	DON; 2; 6	OUL; 7	BRH; 1 Ret	BRH; 2; 5	DON; 2	THR; Ret	SIL; 1													8th	42	
1992	M Team Shell Racing	BMW 318is		SIL; 8	THR; 8	OUL; 4	SNE; Ret	BRH; 6	DON; 1; 4	DON; 2; 1	SIL; 4	KNO; 1; 2	KNO; 2; 1	**PEM**; 1	BRH; 1; 1	**BRH**; **2**; 1	DON; 1	SIL; 4													**1st**	**152**	
1993	Renault Dealer Racing	Renault 19		SIL; 11	DON; 1	SNE; Ret	DON; 16	OUL; Ret	BRH; 1; 11	BRH; 2; 8	PEM; Ret	SIL; Ret	KNO; 1	KNO; 2	OUL; Ret	BRH; 14	THR; 16	DON; 1; 3	DON; 2 Ret	SIL; 15											14th	31	
1994	Renault Dealer Racing	Renault Laguna		THR; 10	BRH; 1 Ret	BRH; 2 DNS	SNE; Ret	SIL; 1 Ret	SIL; 2; 8	OUL; Ret	DON; 1; 9	DON; 2; 10	BRH; 1 Ret	BRH; 2; 11	SIL; 4	KNO; 1 DSQ	KNO; 2; 4	OUL; 6	BRH; 1; 4	BRH; 2 Ret	**SIL**; **1**; 1	**SIL**; **2**; 18	DON; 1; 5	DON; 2; 8							9th	77	
1995	Volvo 850 Racing	Volvo 850 20v		DON; 1; 8	DON; 2; 3	BRH; 1; 1	BRH; 2; 1	THR; 1; 15	THR; 2; 7	SIL; 1; 7	SIL; 2; 3	OUL; 1; 8	OUL; 2; 15	BRH; 1; 3	BRH; 2; 5	DON; 1; 10	DON; 2; 12	SIL; Ret	KNO; 1; 2	KNO; 2; 3	BRH; 1; 7	BRH; 2; 7	SNE; 1 Ret	SNE; 2; 2	OUL; 1 Ret	OUL; 2; 5	SIL; 1; 10	SIL; 2; 7			5th	176	
1996	Total Team Peugeot	Peugeot 406		DON; 1; 11	DON; 2; 9	BRH; 1 Ret	BRH; 2; 9	THR; 1 Ret	THR; 2 Ret	SIL; 1; 13	SIL; 2 Ret	OUL; 1 Ret	OUL; 2; 8	SNE; 1; 4	SNE; 2 Ret	BRH; 1 Ret	BRH; 2; 9	SIL; 1 Ret	SIL; 2; 13	KNO; 1 Ret	KNO; 2 Ret	OUL; 1 Ret	OUL; 2 Ret	THR; 1 Ret	THR; 2; 12	DON; 1; 10	DON; 2; 14	BRH; 1; 13	BRH; 2; 9		15th	20	
1997	Esso Ultron Team Peugeot	Peugeot 406		DON; 1; 10	DON; 2 Ret	SIL; 1; 11	SIL; 2; 4	THR; 1; 9	THR; 2; 2	BRH; 1 Ret	BRH; 2; 10	OUL; 1 Ret	OUL; 2; 8	DON; 1; 7	DON; 2; 2	CRO; 1; 10	CRO; 2; 7	KNO; 1; 14	KNO; 2; 9	SNE; 1; 8	SNE; 2; 15	THR; 1; 6	THR; 2; 13	BRH; 1; 5	BRH; 2; 9	SIL; 1; 13	SIL; 2 Ret				9th	66	
1998	Esso Ultron Team Peugeot	Peugeot 406		THR; 1; 13	THR; 2 Ret	SIL; 1; 11	SIL; 2; 18	DON; 1; 9	DON; 2; 11	BRH; 1 Ret	BRH; 2; 11	OUL; 1 Ret	OUL; 2 Ret	DON; 1 Ret	DON; 2 Ret	CRO; 1; 16	CRO; 2; 18	SNE; 1; 12	SNE; 2 Ret	THR; 1; 15	THR; 2; 9*	KNO; 1; 15	KNO; 2; 11	BRH; 1; 14	BRH; 2; 8*	OUL; 1; 14	OUL; 2; 10	SIL; 1 Ret	SIL; 2 Ret		17th	10	
2001	JS Motorsport	Alfa Romeo 147	T	BRH; 1	BRH; 2	THR; 1	THR; 2	OUL; 1 ovr:17 cls:6	OUL; 2 ovr:3* cls:3	SIL; 1 DNS	SIL; 2 Ret	MON; 1	MON; 2	DON; 1 DNS	DON; 2 DNS	KNO; 1	KNO; 2	SNE; 1	SNE; 2	CRO; 1 Ret	CRO; 2 Ret	OUL; 1 ovr:8 cls:5	OUL; 2 ovr:5 cls:5	SIL; 1 ovr:16 cls:9	SIL; 2 Ret	DON; 1 ovr:13 cls:7	DON; 2 Ret	BRH; 1 ovr:7 cls:6	BRH; 2 Ret		8th	43	
2002	Team Halfords	Peugeot 406 Coupé	T	BRH; 1 Ret	BRH; 2 ovr:7* cls:7	OUL; 1 Ret	OUL; 2 ovr:6 cls:6	THR; 1 ovr:5 cls:5	THR; 2 ovr:4* cls:4	SIL; 1 Ret	SIL; 2 ovr:5 cls:5	MON; 1 ovr:7 cls:7	MON; 2 DSQ	CRO; 1 Ret	CRO; 2 Ret	SNE; 1 Ret	SNE; 2 DNS	KNO; 1 ovr:11 cls:11	KNO; 2 ovr:9 cls:9	BRH; 1 ovr:6 cls:6	BRH; 2 ovr:3 cls:3	DON; 1 Ret	DON; 2 Ret*							−10	11th	43	

1. – Race was stopped due to heavy rain. No points were awarded.

‡ Endurance driver

=== Complete World Touring Car Championship results ===
(key) (Races in bold indicate pole position) (Races in italics indicate fastest lap)

Year	Team	Car	1	2	3	4	5	6	7	8	9	10	11	DC	Pts
1987	(United Kingdom) Team Istel	Rover Vitesse	MNZ	JAR	DIJ	NÜR	SPA	BNO	SIL; Ret	BAT	CLD	WEL	FJI	NC	0

=== Complete Japanese Touring Car Championship results ===
(key) (Races in bold indicate pole position) (Races in italics indicate fastest lap)

Year	Team	Car	1	2	3	4	5	6	7	8	9	10	11	12	13	14	15	16	17	18	DC	Pts
1994	Motorola Pagers Racing	BMW 318i	AUT; 1	AUT; 2	SUG; 1	SUG; 2	TOK; 1	TOK; 2	SUZ; 1	SUZ; 2	MIN; 1	MIN; 2	AID; 1	AID; 2	TSU; 1	TSU; 2	SEN; 1	SEN; 2	FUJ; 1; 17	FUJ; 2; 16	NC	0

=== Complete Asia-Pacific Touring Car Championship results ===
(key) (Races in bold indicate pole position) (Races in italics indicate fastest lap)

Year	Team	Car	1	2	3	4	5	6	7	8	9	10	11	12	DC	Points
1994	(Japan) Motorola Pagers Racing	BMW 318i	FUJ; 1; 17	FUJ; 2; 16	MAC; 1; 4	MAC; 2; 5	SEN; 1 C	SEN; 2 C	WEL; 1; 2	WEL; 2; 1	CLD; 1 C	CLD; 2 C	CHE; 1 C	CHE; 2 C	2nd	?

=== Complete Bathurst 1000 results ===
Year	Team	Co-driver	Car	Laps	Pos.
1997*	(United Kingdom) Esso Ultron Team Peugeot	(New Zealand) Paul Radisich	Peugeot 406	70	DNF
1998*	(United Kingdom) Volvo S40 Racing	(Sweden) Jan Nilsson	Volvo S40	82	DNF

* Super Touring race

=== Le Mans 24 hours results ===
Year	Team	Co-Drivers	Car	Class	Laps	Pos.	Class Pos.
1988	(United Kingdom) Charles Ivey Racing (United Kingdom) Team Istel	(United Kingdom) Chris Hodgetts (United Kingdom) John Sheldon	Tiga GC287	C2	301	20th	**3rd**
1989	(United Kingdom) Spice Engineering	(Denmark) Thorkild Thyrring (South Africa) Wayne Taylor	Spice SE89C-Ford	C1	150	DNF	DNF
1990	(United Kingdom) Spice Engineering	(Spain) Fermín Velez (United Kingdom) Chris Hodgetts	Spice SE90C - Ford	Gr.C1	308	18th	18th
1991	(Netherlands) Euro Racing	(Netherlands) Charles Zwolsman (Netherlands) Cor Euser	Spice SE90C-Ford Cosworth	C1	72	DNF	DNF

=== Complete British GT results ===
(key) (Races in bold indicate pole position in class) (Races in italics indicate fastest lap in class)

Year	Team	Car	Class	1	2	3	4	5	6	7	8	9	10	11	12	13	14	15	Pos	Pts
2000	Bob Watson Motorsport	Porsche 911 GT2	GT	THR; 1	CRO; 1	OUL; 1; 1	DON; 1; 8†	SIL; 1 Ret	BRH; 1 WD	DON; 1 Ret	CRO; 1; 2								9th	56
2000	HKM Parr Motorsport	Chrysler Viper GTS-R	GT									SIL; 1; 5	**SNE**; **1**; 2	SPA; 1 DNS	SIL; 1; 5				9th	56
2001	Hayles Racing	Chrysler Viper GTS-R	GT	**SIL**; **1**; 2	**SNE**; **1**; 1	**DON**; **1**; 2	**OUL**; **1**; 1	**CRO**; **1**; 3	ROC; 1; 2	CAS; 1 DSQ	BRH; 1 Ret	DON; 1; 3	KNO; 1; 1	THR; 1; 2	**BRH**; **1**; 1	SIL; 1; 3			2nd	?
2005	Motorbase Performance	Porsche 996 GT3 Cup	GT3	DON; 1	MAG; 1	CRO; 1	CRO; 2	KNO; 1	KNO; 2	THR; 1; 9	**THR**; **2**; 10	CAS; 1	CAS; 2	SIL; 1	MON; 1	MON; 2			?	14
2005	Team RPM	Porsche 996 GT3 Cup	GT3 INV														SIL; 1; 25	SIL; 2; 7	-†	0†
2007	Team RPM	Viper Competition Coupe	GT3	OUL; 1	OUL; 2	DON; 1	DON; 2	SNE	BRH; 1	BRH; 2	SIL	THR; 1; 18	THR; 2; 5	CRO; 1	CRO; 2	ROC; 1	ROC; 2		24th	4
2008	Trackspeed	Porsche 997 GT3-S	GT3	OUL; 1	OUL; 2	KNO; 1	KNO; 2	ROC; 1; 9	ROC; 2; 7	SNE; 1	SNE; 2	THR; 1	THR; 2	BRH; 1	BRH; 2	SIL	DON		47th	2
2012	Trackspeed	Porsche 997 GT3-R	GT3	OUL; 1; 10	OUL; 2; 3	NÜR; 1; 8	NÜR; 2; 12	ROC; 6	BRH; 9	SNE; 1; 7	**SNE**; **2**; 2	SIL; 11	DON; Ret						11th	59

† Not eligible for points as invitation driver.

Awards and achievements
Preceded by David Coulthard	Autosport; National Racing Driver of the Year; 1992	Succeeded by Kelvin Burt
Sporting positions
Preceded by Altfrid Heger	Guia Race winner 1989	Succeeded by Masahiro Hasemi
Preceded by Will Hoy	British Touring Car Champion; 1992	Succeeded by Joachim Winkelhock
Preceded by James Sutton	Porsche Carrera Cup UK Champion; 2008	Succeeded by Tim Bridgman
Preceded by Tim Bridgman	Porsche Carrera Cup UK Champion; 2010	Succeeded by James Sutton
