= 1988 Asia-Pacific Touring Car Championship =

Seasons
- ← none 1994 →

The 1988 Asia-Pacific Touring Car Championship was a Fédération Internationale de l'Automobile (FIA) sanctioned motor racing series run for Group A Touring Cars. It was the first of only two times the championship was run, with the next not being held until 1994.

Trevor Crowe was the winner of the inaugural series driving a BMW M3 for fellow Kiwi John Sax. The M3 was a Division 2 car and gained more points for outright places. Second was veteran Australian racer Colin Bond in his Caltex sponsored Ford Sierra RS500, while third was taken by Italian driver Emanuele Pirro driving a BMW M3 for Schnitzer Motorsport.

With the championship generally ignored by most of the top teams from the stronger Group A championships (Australia, Europe and Japan), Crowe, Bond and Pirro were able to gain the top three placings despite each only running in two of the four rounds.

== Schedule ==
The championship was run over four rounds, starting on 2 October at the Tooheys 1000 in Bathurst, Australia, and finishing on 13 November with the Inter-tec 500 at the Fuji circuit in Japan.

Date	Race	Circuit	winner	car	Results
2 October	Bathurst 1000	(Australia) Mount Panorama Circuit	(Australia) Tony Longhurst (Australia) Tomas Mezera	Ford Sierra RS500	Report
24 October	Wellington 500	(New Zealand) Wellington Street Circuit	(Italy) Emanuele Pirro (Italy) Roberto Ravaglia	BMW M3	Report
30 October	Pukekohe Park 500	(New Zealand) Pukekohe Park Raceway	(Australia) Andrew Miedecke (United Kingdom) Steve Soper	Ford Sierra RS500	Report
13 November	Fuji Inter-tec 500	(Japan) Fuji Speedway	(West Germany) Klaus Niedzwiedz (Japan) Hisashi Yokoshima	Ford Sierra RS500	Report
