= Joachim Winkelhock =

German racing driver (born 1960)

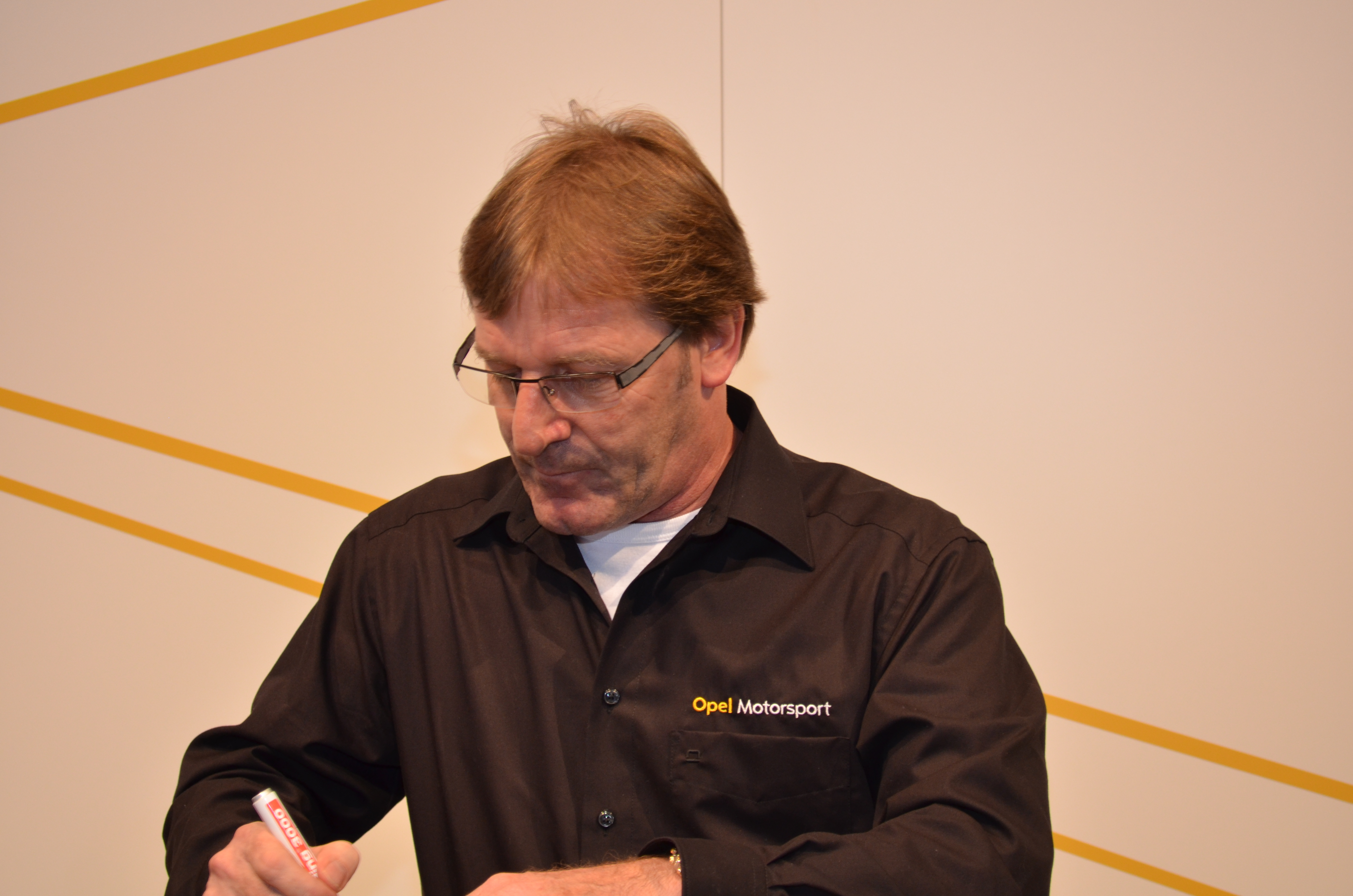
- Winkelhock in 2013
- Born: 24 October 1960 (age 66); Waiblingen, West Germany
- Relatives: Manfred Winkelhock (brother); Thomas Winkelhock (brother); Markus Winkelhock (nephew)

Formula One World Championship career
- Nationality: (Germany) German
- Active years: 1989
- Team: AGS
- Entries: 7 (0 starts)
- Championships: 0
- Wins: 0
- Podiums: 0
- Career points: 0
- Pole positions: 0
- Fastest laps: 0
- First entry: 1989 Brazilian Grand Prix
- Last entry: 1989 French Grand Prix

Joachim Winkelhock (born 24 October 1960) is a German motor racing driver. He competed in and won German Formula Three before moving onto Formula One.

Winkelhock would compete in the 1989 season of F1 with the Automobiles Gonfaronnaises Sportives where he would fail to qualify for a race before being replaced mid season with driver Yannick Dalmas. After his brief stint in Formula One Winkelhock would later race in the British Touring Car Championship, where he won the Oulton Park International Gold Cup twice, and the Deutsche Tourenwagen Meisterschaft until 2003. The height of Winkelhock's career was his 1999 24 Hours of Le Mans win for BMW. Winkelhock is part of a racing family with his late older brother Manfred Winkelhock, his younger brother, Thomas Winkelhock, and his nephew, son of Manfred, Markus Winkelhock all being racing drivers.

== Career ==
Winkelhock started in the one-make Renault 5 Cup in 1979, and in 1986 he won the Porsche Carrera Cup Germany, but it would be almost a decade before he found his first major success, by winning the 1988 German Formula Three Championship as well as that year's F3 European Cup (at the unusually late age of 28). He progressed the following year to Formula One with the small French AGS team, who paired him with his future touring car rival Gabriele Tarquini; Winklehock's brief time in F1 was unsuccessful, failing to pre-qualify the car on seven occasions. His reputation however remained strong enough that he was subsequently hired by BMW Motorsport for German's premier touring car racing series the Deutsche Tourenwagen Meisterschaft, first for the Bigazzi and then Schnitzer teams. He finished sixth, seventh and eighth in the final standings and scored three wins in total during his three years in the series, as well as winning the 1990 and 1991 24 Hours of Nürburgring races for BMW and Schnitzer.

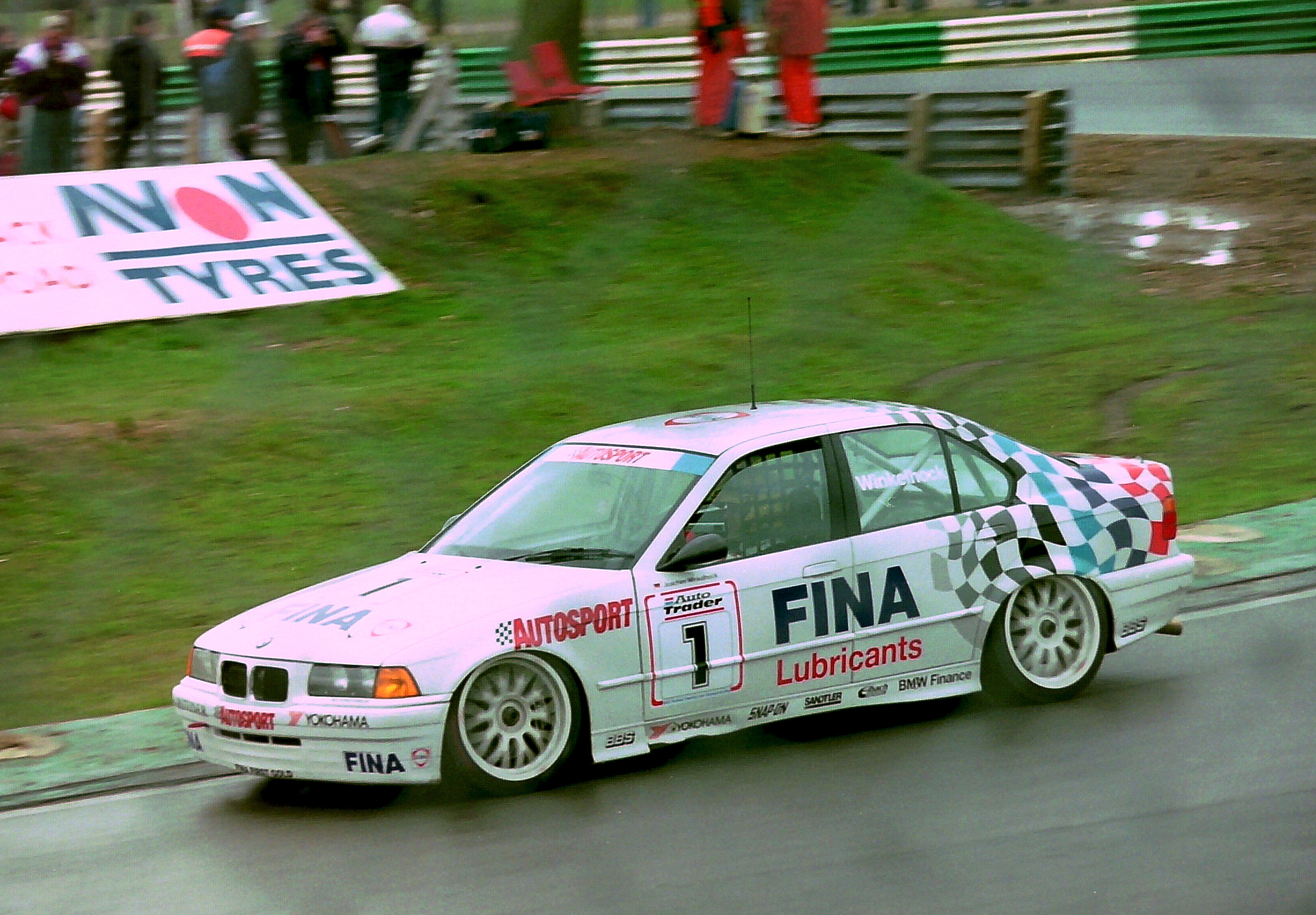
Winkelhock driving for BMW at Brands Hatch during the 1994 British Touring Car Championship season.

When BMW exited the DTM at the end of 1992, Winkelhock moved with the manufacturer and Schnitzer to the British Touring Car Championship, where he and teammate Steve Soper dominated the first half of the 1993 season. The pair took seven wins from the first eight rounds (Winklehock four, Soper three). Although the second half of the year was more challenging for Winkelhock, seeing him earn only one more win, he was still eventually crowned champion. During his time in Britain, he was also commonly known as Smokin' Jo for his cigarette smoking habit. Winkelhock's next win was the 1994 Asia Pacific Touring Car Championship, and in 1995, he won the German Supertouring Championship (STW). He also triumphed in the 1995 Spa 24 Hours, and the 1994 and 1998 Macau Grand Prix's Guia touring car races. His last success for BMW came at the 1999 24 Hours of Le Mans, which he won driving the BMW V12 LMR prototype run by Schnitzer Motorsport.

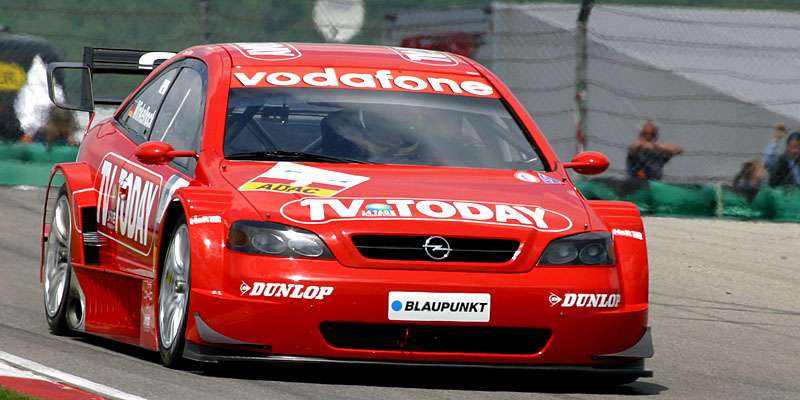
Winkelhock driving the OPC Team Phoenix Opel Astra at the Sachsenring during the 2002 DTM season.

In 2000, Winkelhock joined Opel in the new Deutsche Tourenwagen Masters (a revived version of the Deutsche Tourenwagen Meisterschaft, which had been defunct since 1995). In his first season in the new DTM, Winkelhock was competitive, winning at the Norisring and finishing fifth in the final standings. However, the collapse in Opel's fortunes in DTM after 2000 saw a consequent decline in Winkelhock's fortunes and after a 2003 season in which he only scored a single point, he announced his retirement from motor racing at the age of 43.

Winkelhock runs his family's Waiblingen-based truck-crane and towing business, occasionally getting personally involved in recovering crashed trucks.

A special edition of the BMW M5 has been made in honor of Winkelhock.

A 2005 poll run by Motor Sport magazine voted Winkelhock the 16th greatest touring car driver ever. Winkelhock is nicknamed "Smokin' Jo".

== Racing record ==
=== Complete German Formula Three results ===
(key) (Races in bold indicate pole position) (Races in italics indicate fastest lap)

Year	Entrant	Engine	Class	1	2	3	4	5	6	7	8	9	10	11	12	DC	Pts
1987	WTS Racing Team	VW	A	NÜR; 9	AVU; 10	ZOL; 2	HOC; 2	ÖST	SIE; 2	**NÜR**; 2	NÜR; 2	**ZOL**; 1				2nd	98
1988	WTS Liqui Moly Equipe	VW	A	**ZOL**; 1	**HOC**; 1	**NÜR**; 1	BRN; 3	**HOC**; Ret	MAI; 2	**NOR**; C	WUN; 1	SAL; 5	NÜR; 2	HUN; 2	HOC; Ret	1st	164

=== Complete Formula One results ===
(key) (Races in bold indicate pole position; races in italics indicate fastest lap)

Year	Entrant	Chassis	Engine	1	2	3	4	5	6	7	8	9	10	11	12	13	14	15	16	WDC	Pts
1989	Automobiles Gonfaronnaises Sportives	AGS JH23B	Ford Cosworth DFR 3.5 V8	BRA; DNPQ	SMR; DNPQ	MON; DNPQ	MEX; DNPQ	USA; DNPQ	CAN; DNPQ	FRA; DNPQ	GBR	GER	HUN	BEL	ITA	POR	ESP	JPN	AUS	NC	0

=== Complete European Touring Car Championship results ===
(key) (Races in bold indicate pole position) (Races in italics indicate fastest lap)

Year	Team	Car	1	2	3	4	5	6	7	8	9	10	11	12	13	14	DC	Pts
1984	Linder Rennsport	BMW 323i	MNZ	VAL	DON	PER	BRN	ZEL	SAL	NUR; Ret	SPA	SIL	ZOL	MUG			NC	0
1986	Ford Rennsport HWRT Tuning	Ford Sierra XR4 TI	MNZ	DON	HOC	MIS	AND	BRN	ZEL	NÜR; 14	SPA; Ret	SIL	NOG	ZOL	JAR; 9	EST; Ret	69th	4
1987	Wolf Racing Team	Ford Sierra RS Cosworth	DON	EST	AND	ZOL; DNQ	**ZEL**; DSQ	IMO									NC	0
1987	Wolf Racing Team	Ford Sierra RS500							**NOG**; Ret								NC	0

=== Complete Deutsche Tourenwagen Meisterschaft/Masters results ===
(key) (Races in bold indicate pole position) (Races in italics indicate fastest lap)

Year	Team	Car	1	2	3	4	5	6	7	8	9	10	11	12	13	14	15	16	17	18	19	20	21	22	23	24	Pos.	Pts
1986	BMW Isert	BMW 325i	ZOL	HOC; Ret	NÜR; Ret	AVU; DNS	MFA; 17	WUN; 6	NÜR; 8	ZOL; Ret	NÜR; 6																17th	39
1987	Wolf Racing	Ford Sierra XR4 TI	HOC; Ret	ZOL; 11	NÜR; 22	AVU; 10	MFA; Ret	NOR; Ret	NÜR	WUN																	23rd	28
1987	Wolf Racing	Ford Sierra RS 500 Cosworth									DIE; 14	SAL															23rd	28
1989	AMG Motorenbau GmbH	Mercedes 190 E 2.5-16 Evo	ZOL; 1	ZOL; 2	HOC; 1	HOC; 2	NÜR; 1	NÜR; 2	MFA; 1	MFA; 2	AVU; 1	AVU; 2	NÜR; 1	NÜR; 2	NOR; 1 Ret	NOR; 2 DNS	HOC; 1; 6	HOC; 2 Ret	DIE; 1	DIE; 2	NÜR; 1	NÜR; 2	HOC; 1	HOC; 2			34th	13
1990	Bigazzi M Team	BMW M3 Sport Evo	ZOL; 1; 7	ZOL; 2; 12	HOC; 1; 7	HOC; 2; 4	NÜR; 1; 2	NÜR; 2 Ret	AVU; 1; 24	AVU; 2 Ret	MFA; 1 Ret	MFA; 2 Ret	WUN; 1; 5	WUN; 2; 2	NÜR; 1; 2	NÜR; 2 Ret	NOR; 1; 26	NOR; 2 DNS	DIE; 1; 4	DIE; 2; 1	NÜR; 1; 6	NÜR; 2; 4	HOC; 1; 13	HOC; 2; 9			6th	119
1991	M Team Team Schnitzer	BMW M3 Sport Evolution	ZOL; 1; 8	ZOL; 2 Ret	HOC; 1; 3	HOC; 2; 17	NÜR; 1 Ret	NÜR; 2; 3	AVU; 1; 8	AVU; 2; 6	WUN; 1; 1	**WUN**; **2**; 2	NOR; 1; 11	NOR; 2 Ret	DIE; 1 DSQ	DIE; 2; 5	NÜR; 1; 7	NÜR; 2 Ret	ALE; 1 Ret	ALE; 2; 4	HOC; 1; 5	HOC; 2; 15	BRN; 1; 6	BRN; 2 Ret	DON; 1; 7	DON; 2; 6	7th	101
1992	M Team Team Schnitzer	BMW M3 Sport Evolution	ZOL; 1 Ret	ZOL; 2; 9	NÜR; 1; 9	NÜR; 2; 4	WUN; 1; 10	WUN; 2 Ret	AVU; 1; 5	AVU; 2 Ret	HOC; 1; 11	HOC; 2; 7	NÜR; 1; 12	NÜR; 2; 11	NOR; 1; 1	**NOR**; **2**; 2	BRN; 1 Ret	BRN; 2; 6	DIE; 1; 6	DIE; 2; 9	ALE; 1 Ret	ALE; 2 Ret	NÜR; 1; 7	NÜR; 2; 5	HOC; 1; 4	HOC; 2; 3	8th	110
2000	Team Holzer	Opel Astra V8 Coupé	HOC; 1; 10	HOC; 2; 6	OSC; 1; 2	OSC; 2; 2	**NOR**; **1**; 1	**NOR**; **2**; 4	SAC; 1 Ret	SAC; 2; 19	NÜR; 1; 9	NÜR; 2; 19	LAU; 1 C	LAU; 2 C	OSC; 1 NC	OSC; 2 Ret	**NÜR**; **1**; 5	NÜR; 2; 5	HOC; 1; 3	HOC; 2; 2							5th	113
2001	Team Holzer	Opel Astra V8 Coupé	HOC; QR; Ret	HOC; CR; DNS	NÜR; QR; 19	NÜR; CR; 13	OSC; QR; 21	OSC; CR; 17	SAC; QR; 15	SAC; CR; Ret	NOR; QR; 6	NOR; CR; 4	LAU; QR; Ret	LAU; CR; 14	NÜR; QR; 16	NÜR; CR; 13	A1R; QR; 16	A1R; CR; 9	ZAN; QR; Ret	ZAN; CR; DNS	HOC; QR; Ret	HOC; CR; DNS					16th	12
2002	OPC Team Phoenix	Opel Astra V8 Coupé	HOC; QR; 16	HOC; CR; 10	ZOL; QR; 18	ZOL; CR; 17	DON; QR; Ret	DON; CR; DNS	SAC; QR; 5	SAC; CR; 5	NOR; QR; 6	NOR; CR; Ret	LAU; QR; 7	LAU; CR; 6	NÜR; QR; 13	NÜR; CR; 15	A1R; QR; 9	A1R; CR; 19	ZAN; QR; 15	ZAN; CR; 10	HOC; QR; 9	HOC; CR; 7					13th	3
2003	OPC Euroteam	Opel Astra V8 Coupé	HOC; 16	ADR; 9	NÜR; 10	LAU; 11	NOR; 8	DON; 10	NÜR; 13	A1R; 14	ZAN; 15	HOC; Ret															15th	1

=== Complete World Touring Car Championship results ===
(key) (Races in bold indicate pole position) (Races in italics indicate fastest lap)

Year	Team	Car	1	2	3	4	5	6	7	8	9	10	11	DC	Points
1987	Wolf Racing Team	Ford Sierra RS Cosworth	MNZ	JAR	DIJ	NUR; Ret	SPA; Ret							NC	0
1987	Wolf Racing Team	Ford Sierra RS500						BNO ovr:14 cls:4†	SIL ovr:9 cls:2†	BAT	CLD	WEL	FJI	NC	0

† Not eligible for series points

=== Complete Italian Touring Car Championship results ===
(key) (Races in bold indicate pole position) (Races in italics indicate fastest lap)

Year	Team	Car	Class	1	2	3	4	5	6	7	8	9	10	11	12	13	14	15	16	17	18	19	20	Pos.	Pts
1992	Schnitzer Motorsport	BMW M3 Sport Evolution	S1	MNZ; 1; 14	MNZ; 2; 4	MAG; 1	MAG; 2	MUG; 1	MUG; 2	BIN; 1	BIN; 2	VAL; 1	VAL; 2	IMO; 1	IMO; 2	MIS; 1	MIS; 2	PER; 1	PER; 2	VAR; 1	VAR; 2	MNZ; 1	MNZ; 2	18th	10
1994	Scuderia Bigazzi	BMW 318i		MNZ; 1; 10	MNZ; 2; 9	VAL; 1	VAL; 2	MAG; 1	MAG; 2	BIN; 1	BIN; 2	MIS; 1	MIS; 2	VAL; 1	VAL; 2	MUG; 1	MUG; 2	PER; 1	PER; 2	VAR; 1	VAR; 2	MUG; 1	MUG; 2	26th	3
1996	Scuderia Bigazzi	BMW 320i		MUG; 1	MUG; 2	MAG; 1	MAG; 2	MNZ; 1	MNZ; 2	BIN; 1	BIN; 2	MIS; 1	MIS; 2	IMO; 1	IMO; 2	PER; 1	PER; 2	PER; 1	PER; 2	VAR; 1	VAR; 2	VAL; 1; 7	VAL; 2; 17	23rd	4

=== Complete British Touring Car Championship results ===
(key) (Races in bold indicate pole position – 1 point awarded all races 1996 only) (Races in italics indicate fastest lap)

Year	Team	Car	1	2	3	4	5	6	7	8	9	10	11	12	13	14	15	16	17	18	19	20	21	22	23	24	25	26	Pos.	Pts
1993	BMW Motorsport Team	BMW 318i	SIL; 1; 2	DON; 1 Ret	SNE; 1; 5	**DON**; **1**; 1	OUL; 1; 1	BRH; 1; 1	**BRH**; **2** Ret	PEM; 1; 1	SIL; 1; 4	KNO; 1; 3	KNO; 2 DNS	**OUL**; **1**; 1	BRH; 1; 20	THR; 1; 14	DON; 1; 5	DON; 2; 3	SIL; 1; 8										**1st**	**163**
1994	BMW Motorsport Team Schnitzer	BMW 318i	THR; 1; 3	BRH; 1 Ret	BRH; 2; 7	SNE; 1 Ret	SIL; 1; 14	SIL; 2; 14	OUL; 1; 8	DON; 1 Ret	DON; 2; 8	BRH; 1; 8	BRH; 2; 7	**SIL**; **1**; 1	KNO; 1 Ret	KNO; 2; 11	OUL; 1; 1	**BRH**; **1**; 1	**BRH**; **2**; 1	SIL; 1 Ret	SIL; 2 DNS	**DON**; **1**; 4	DON; 2; 3						6th	147
1996	BMW Team Schnitzer	BMW 320i	DON; 1; 8	DON; 2; 13	BRH; 1; 3	**BRH**; **2**; 1	THR; 1; 12	**THR**; **2**; 1	SIL; 1 Ret	SIL; 2 Ret	OUL; 1; 1	OUL; 2 Ret	**SNE**; **1**; 5	**SNE**; **2**; 1	BRH; 1; 6	BRH; 2; 2	SIL; 1; 5	SIL; 2 Ret	KNO; 1; 5	KNO; 2; 5	OUL; 1; 6	OUL; 2; 4	THR; 1 Ret	**THR**; **2**; 6	DON; 1; 7	DON; 2; 6	**BRH**; **1** DNS	**BRH**; **2**; 3	5th	158

=== Complete Japanese Touring Car Championship results ===
(key) (Races in bold indicate pole position) (Races in italics indicate fastest lap)

Year	Team	Car	1	2	3	4	5	6	7	8	9	10	11	12	13	14	15	16	17	18	Pos.	Pts
1994	BMW Team Schnitzer	BMW 318i	AUT; 1	AUT; 2	SUG; 1	SUG; 2	TOK; 1; 8	TOK; 2; 4	SUZ; 1 Ret	SUZ; 2 Ret	MIN; 1	MIN; 2	AID; 1	AID; 2	TSU; 1	TSU; 2	SEN; 1	SEN; 2	FUJ; 1; 3	FUJ; 2; 2	10th	31
1995	BMW Team Schnitzer	BMW 318i	FUJ; 1; 7	FUJ; 2 Ret	SUG; 1	SUG; 2	TOK; 1	TOK; 2	SUZ; 1	SUZ; 2	MIN; 1; 11	MIN; 2; 5	AID; 1; 15	AID; 2 Ret	**SEN**; **1**; 1	**SEN**; **2**; 2	FUJ; 1 Ret	FUJ; 2; 7			9th	41

=== Complete Super Tourenwagen Cup results ===
(key) (Races in bold indicate pole position) (Races in italics indicate fastest lap)

Year	Team	Car	1	2	3	4	5	6	7	8	9	10	11	12	13	14	15	16	17	18	19	20	Pos.	Pts
1994	BMW Team Bigazzi	BMW 318i	AVU	WUN	ZOL	ZAN	ÖST; 5	SAL	SPA	NÜR; 7													13th	12
1995	BMW Team Schnitzer	BMW 318is	ZOL; 1; 6	ZOL; 2; 5	SPA; 1; 1	**SPA**; **2**; 1	**ÖST**; **1**; 1	**ÖST**; **2** Ret	HOC; 1; 6	HOC; 2; 14	NÜR; 1; 7	NÜR; 2; 6	SAL; 1; 1	SAL; 2; 1	AVU; 1; 2	AVU; 2; 1	NÜR; 1; 13	NÜR; 2; 2					1st	418
1997	BMW Motorsport Team Bigazzi	BMW 320i	HOC; 1; 4	HOC; 2; 2	ZOL; 1; 2	ZOL; 2; 2	NÜR; 1 Ret	NÜR; 2 Ret	SAC; 1; 1	SAC; 2; 1	NOR; 1; 1	NOR; 2; 1	WUN; 1; 2	WUN; 2; 3	ZWE; 1; 2	ZWE; 2; 5	SAL; 1; 4	SAL; 2; 2	REG; 1; 7	REG; 2; 1	NÜR; 1; 3	NÜR; 2; 2	2nd	644
1998	BMW Motorsport Team Schnitzer	BMW 320i	HOC; 1; 3	HOC; 2; 3	NÜR; 1; 7	NÜR; 2; 7	SAC; 1; 9	SAC; 2; 2	NOR; 1; 10	NOR; 2; 5	REG; 1 Ret	REG; 2 Ret	WUN; 1; 10	WUN; 2; 11	ZWE; 1; 2	ZWE; 2; 2	SAL; 1; 13	SAL; 2; 16	OSC; 1; 4	OSC; 2; 3	NÜR; 1 Ret	NÜR; 2; 10	6th	405

=== Complete Asia-Pacific Touring Car Championship results ===
(key) (Races in bold indicate pole position) (Races in italics indicate fastest lap)

Year	Team	Car	1	2	3	4	5	6	7	8	9	10	11	12	DC	Points
1994	(Germany) BMW Team Schnitzer	BMW 318i	FUJ; 1; 3	FUJ; 2; 2	MAC; 1; 1	**MAC**; **2**; 1	SEN; 1 C	SEN; 2 C	**WEL**; **1**; 1	**WEL**; **2** Ret	CLD; 1 C	CLD; 2 C	CHE; 1 C	CHE; 2 C	1st	?

=== Complete Bathurst 1000 results ===
Year	Team	Co-driver	Car	Class	Laps	Pos.	Class pos.
1993	(Australia) Diet Coke BMW Race Team	(Australia) Paul Morris	BMW M3	A	146	15th	15th

=== 24 Hours of Le Mans results ===
Year	Team	Co-Drivers	Car	Class	Laps	Pos.	Class Pos.
1998	(Germany) Team BMW Motorsport	(Italy) Pierluigi Martini (Venezuela) Johnny Cecotto	BMW V12 LM	LMP1	43	DNF	DNF
1999	(Germany) BMW Motorsport	(Italy) Pierluigi Martini (France) Yannick Dalmas	BMW V12 LMR	LMP	365	**1st**	**1st**

=== Macau Grand Prix Guia Race results ===
Year	Team	Car	Class	Heat 1	Heat 2	Pos.
1990	(Germany) Team Schnitzer	BMW M3 Sport Evolution	Group A Division 2	-	-	3rd
1991	(Germany) Watson’s Team Schnitzer	BMW M3 Sport Evolution	DTM	-	-	DNF
1992	(Germany) Mobil 1 Team Schnitzer	BMW M3 Sport Evolution	DTM	-	-	2nd
1993	(Germany) Watson’s Team Schnitzer	BMW 318i	FIA Class 2	-	-	2nd
1994	(Germany) San Miguel Team Schnitzer	BMW 318is	FIA Class 2	1st	1st	1st
1995	(Germany) BMW Team Schnitzer	BMW 318is	FIA Class 2	1st	DNF	-
1996	(Italy) BMW Team Bigazzi	BMW 320i	FIA Class 2	1st	DNF	-
1997	(Italy) BMW Team Bigazzi	BMW 320i	FIA Class 2	DNF	3rd	-
1998	(Germany) BMW Team Schnitzer	BMW 320i	FIA Class 2	1st	1st	1st

Sporting positions
Preceded by Inaugural	Porsche Carrera Cup Germany; Champion; 1987	Succeeded by Roland Asch
Preceded by Steve Kempton	FIA European Formula Three Cup; Winner; 1988	Succeeded by Gianni Morbidelli
Preceded by Bernd Schneider	German Formula 3 Championship; Champion; 1988	Succeeded by Karl Wendlinger
Preceded by Tim Harvey	British Touring Car Championship; Champion; 1993	Succeeded by Gabriele Tarquini
Preceded by Charles Kwan	Guia Race; Winner; 1994	Succeeded by Kelvin Burt
Preceded by Johnny Cecotto	Super Tourenwagen Cup; Champion; 1995	Succeeded by Emanuele Pirro
Preceded by Steve Soper	Guia Race; Winner; 1998	Succeeded by Michael Bartels
Preceded by Laurent Aïello; Allan McNish; Stéphane Ortelli	Winner of the 24 Hours of Le Mans; 1999; With: Pierluigi Martini & Yannick Dalmas	Succeeded by Frank Biela; Tom Kristensen; Emanuele Pirro
