= 1994 Guia Race of Macau =

Car race in Macau

Layout of the Guia Circuit

The 1994 Guia Touring car race of Macau held on 20 November 1994, was a motorsport championship for Super Touring racing cars forming a race of the 1994 Asia-Pacific Touring Car Championship. This winner of the two combined races was Joachim Winkelhock who drove for Schnitzer Motorsport.

== Teams and drivers ==
Teams and drivers list:

Team	No.	Driver	Car
Schnitzer Motorsport	1	(Germany) Joachim Winkelhock	BMW 318i
Schnitzer Motorsport	2	(United Kingdom) Steve Soper	BMW 318i
Schnitzer Motorsport	3	(Hong Kong) Charles Kwan	BMW 318i
Motorola Pagers	5	(United Kingdom) Tim Harvey	BMW 318i
Motorola Pagers	6	(United Kingdom) Justin Bell	BMW 318i
Hasemi Motorsport	7	(Japan) Masahiro Hasemi	Nissan Primera
Hyundai Australia	8	(Australia) Colin Bond	Hyundai Lantra
Gianfranco Team	9	(Portugal) Carlos Rodrigues	Ford Sapphire
TPM Opel Motorsport	10	(Portugal) Ni Amorim	Opel Vectra
Giroix Racing	11	(France) Fabien Giroix	SEAT Toledo
Lauderbach Team	12	(Macau) Rui Valente	Opel Astra
–	14	(Hong Kong) Lao Kwok Wah	Toyota Corolla
Macau Racing Team	15	(Hong Kong) Cheung Hoo Kong	Toyota Corolla
Macau Racing Team	91	(United Kingdom) Brian Whillock	Toyota Corolla
PKK Racing Team	17	(Hong Kong) Chan Chi Wah	Honda Civic
PKK Racing Team	20	(Hong Kong) Albert Poon	Honda Civic
–	18	(Hong Kong) Lo Hung Pui	Toyota Corolla
Tomato Racing Team	26	(Hong Kong) David Leung	Honda Civic
Tomato Racing Team	22	(Hong Kong) Chu Yee Ping	Toyota Corolla
–	23	(Hong Kong) To Tat Wah	Honda Civic
–	25	(Hong Kong) Lei Chong Seng	Honda Civic
NISMO	32	(Japan) Toshio Suzuki	Nissan Sunny
Kingston Racing Team	35	(Hong Kong) Ricky Mo	Toyota Corolla
Kingston Racing Team	92	(Hong Kong) Paul Fan	Toyota Corolla
TOM'S	36	(Denmark) Tom Kristensen	Toyota Corona
–	38	(Portugal) Rui Clemante	Toyota Corolla
	39	(Hong Kong) Chan Wai Man	Toyota Corolla
–	53	(Hong Kong) Lau Sui Ching	Honda Civic
–	66	(Hong Kong) Yang Li Chin	Honda Civic
HKS	87	(United Kingdom) Anthony Reid	Opel Vectra
AAI Racing Team	88	(Hong Kong) Yeung Ma Chuen	Honda Civic
IMSP	89	(Hong Kong) Danny Stacy Chau	Honda Civic

== Race results ==
=== Race 1 ===
Position	No.	Driver	Car
1	1	Joachim Winkelhock	BMW 318i
2	2	Steve Soper	BMW 318i
3	36	Tom Kristensen	Toyota Corona
4	5	Tim Harvey	BMW 318i
5	7	Masahiro Hasemi	Nissan Primera
6	3	Charles Kwan	BMW 318i

=== Race 2 ===
Position	No.	Driver	Car
1	1	Joachim Winkelhock	BMW 318i
2	2	Steve Soper	BMW 318i
3	87	Anthony Reid	Opel Vectra
4	36	Tom Kristensen	Toyota Corona
5	5	Tim Harvey	BMW 318i
6	3	Charles Kwan	BMW 318i

=== Overall results ===
Position	No.	Driver	Car	Time
1	1	Joachim Winkelhock	BMW 318i	1:23.40
2	2	Steve Soper	BMW 318i	+ 7.10
3	36	Tom Kristensen	Toyota Corona	+ 56.06
4	5	Tim Harvey	BMW 318i	+ 1:14.67
5	3	Charles Kwan	BMW 318i	+ 2:09.72
6	6	Justin Bell	BMW 318i	+ 2:26.91
