= Wellington 500 =

Former motor racing event held in New Zealand

Coordinates: 41.2893°S 174.7787°E

(New Zealand) Wellington 500
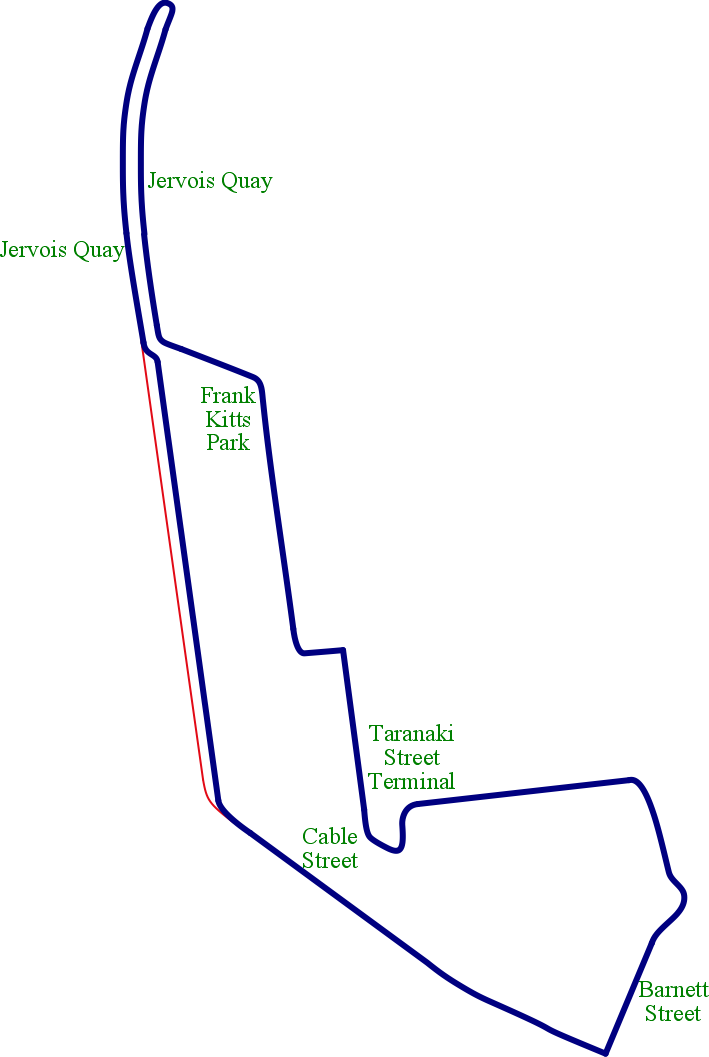
- Race Information
Venue	Wellington Street Circuit
Number of times held	12
First held	1985
Last held	1996
- Race Format
- Race 1
Laps	15
Distance	50 km
- Race 2
Laps	15
Distance	50 km
- Race 3
Laps	15
Distance	50 km
- Last Event (1996)
- Overall Winner
(Australia) John Bowe	Dick Johnson Racing
- Race Winners
(Australia) John Bowe	Dick Johnson Racing
(Australia) John Bowe	Dick Johnson Racing
(New Zealand) Greg Murphy	Holden Racing Team

Wellington Circuit layout (1987), used for the Wellington 500 from 1987 to 1992.

The Wellington 500 was a 500 km (310 mi) street race for touring cars which took place at Wellington City in Wellington, New Zealand in the 1980s and 1990s. The 1987 event was a round of the 1987 World Touring Car Championship.

The final running of the race was in 1996, a non-championship sprint event for teams from the Australian Touring Car Championship.

== History ==
=== Beginnings (1985-86) ===
The race was first proposed in 1984 and first took place a year later, albeit with a different layout from that to the original proposal. Initially dubbed the Nissan Cue 500, the first event in 1985's title was changed at the last minute to the Nissan Sport 500 due to Cue Magazine's demise in the week preceding the event. The following year Mobil became a naming sponsor and the Nissan Mobil 500 name was born.

The Nissan Mobil 500 was actually a two-event series with the first round being held at the Wellington Street Circuit and the second at Pukekohe Park Raceway south of Auckland, known as the Pukekohe 500. The event was run to the Group A touring car regulations of the time. Despite the event name, the distance was on occasion less than 500 kilometres due to the slow average speed of the circuit.

For the first race in 1985, the FIA delegate who inspected the Wellington Street Circuit was 1960 Armstrong 500 winner John Roxburgh from Australia. He voiced serious concerns about the narrowness of the circuit as well as safety and the circuit did not pass inspection. For the race to be able to go ahead the promoters had to re-write the regulations turning the event from an international race to a national race, thus eliminating the need for FIA approval.

=== WTCC round (1987) ===
In 1987, the Nissan Mobil 500 Wellington Street Race was a round of the inaugural FIA World Touring Car Championship. The WTCC lasted only one year and was a victim of its own Group A rules. Both the factory backed BMW Motorsport (Schnitzer) and Ford (Eggenberger) teams were disqualified from some races for technical infringements. Also, Formula One boss Bernie Ecclestone had been given power over the WTCC at the last minute over the original organisers, the NZ based Strathmore Group. Ecclestone imposed a US$60,000 registration fee per car which saw only a small number of cars eligible for championship points. With some races decided by stewards hearings, the WTCC generally descended into a farce by the end of 1987 and the series was not run again in 1988. An Eggenberger Ford Sierra RS500, which had been disqualified from the 1987 Bathurst 1000, won the 1987 Wellington 500.

=== Continued international exposure (1988-92) ===
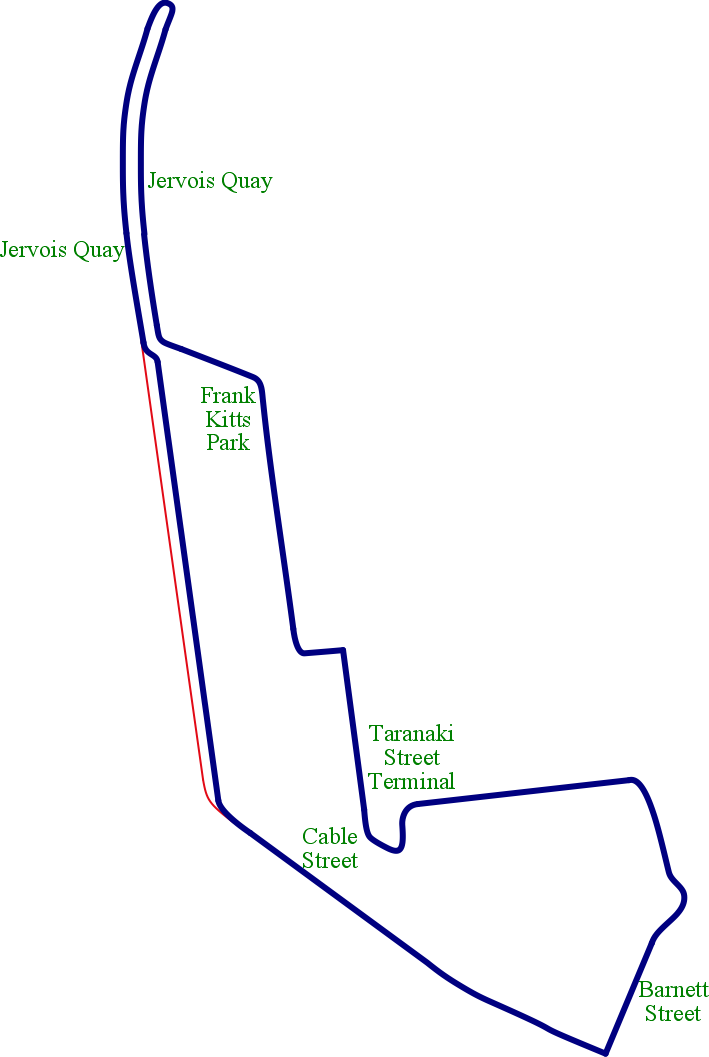
Wellington Street Circuit layout used in 1993-94 and 1996 for the Australian Touring Car Championship.

Despite the WTCC's demise, the race maintained a point of interest for international teams and drivers in the years following the WTCC event with the popularity of the Group A regulations. The 1988 event was a part of the inaugural Asia-Pacific Touring Car Championship. Schnitzer Motorsport dominated the event in this period, winning four consecutive times for BMW. With three different co-drivers, each of these were won by Emanuele Pirro who became the most successful driver in the event's history.

=== End of Group A and final sprint rounds (1993-96) ===
Following the end of Group A regulations, a combined Super Touring and production formula was used in 1993 and 1994. The 1993 event was the final 500 kilometre race held, with sprint races used in 1994 and 1996. The 1994 event was again held as a round of the Asia-Pacific Touring Car Championship which was run for the second and final time. After no event was held in 1995 due to a lack of funding, the circuit was used for a final time in 1996, as a non-championship event for the teams of the Australian Touring Car Championship who had moved to Group 3A Touring Cars regulations in 1993. Twelve cars competed in the event, as part of a two-event series in New Zealand which also included races at Pukekohe. The format consisted of three short sprint races, and the overall winner was John Bowe for Dick Johnson Racing.

=== Demise ===
Despite its popularity, the race never returned after 1996. The Wellington City Council cancelled the event in part because the construction of the Te Papa national museum and the Queen's Wharf Events Centre clashed with the layout of the race track route. In addition the main sponsors Mobil requested a higher level of rate payer subsidy from the City Council.

=== Failed revival plans ===
In 2004, there were plans to revive the race as a V8 Supercars event, to feed on its high popularity in New Zealand, with many popular New Zealand drivers competing in that series in Australia. As the roads where the circuit used to be have now been demolished to make way for a museum and other buildings, it would have had to be run on a new course. There was a new proposal in 2006 with a new layout. Both of the 2006 proposals were revoked through the Resource Management Act 1991.

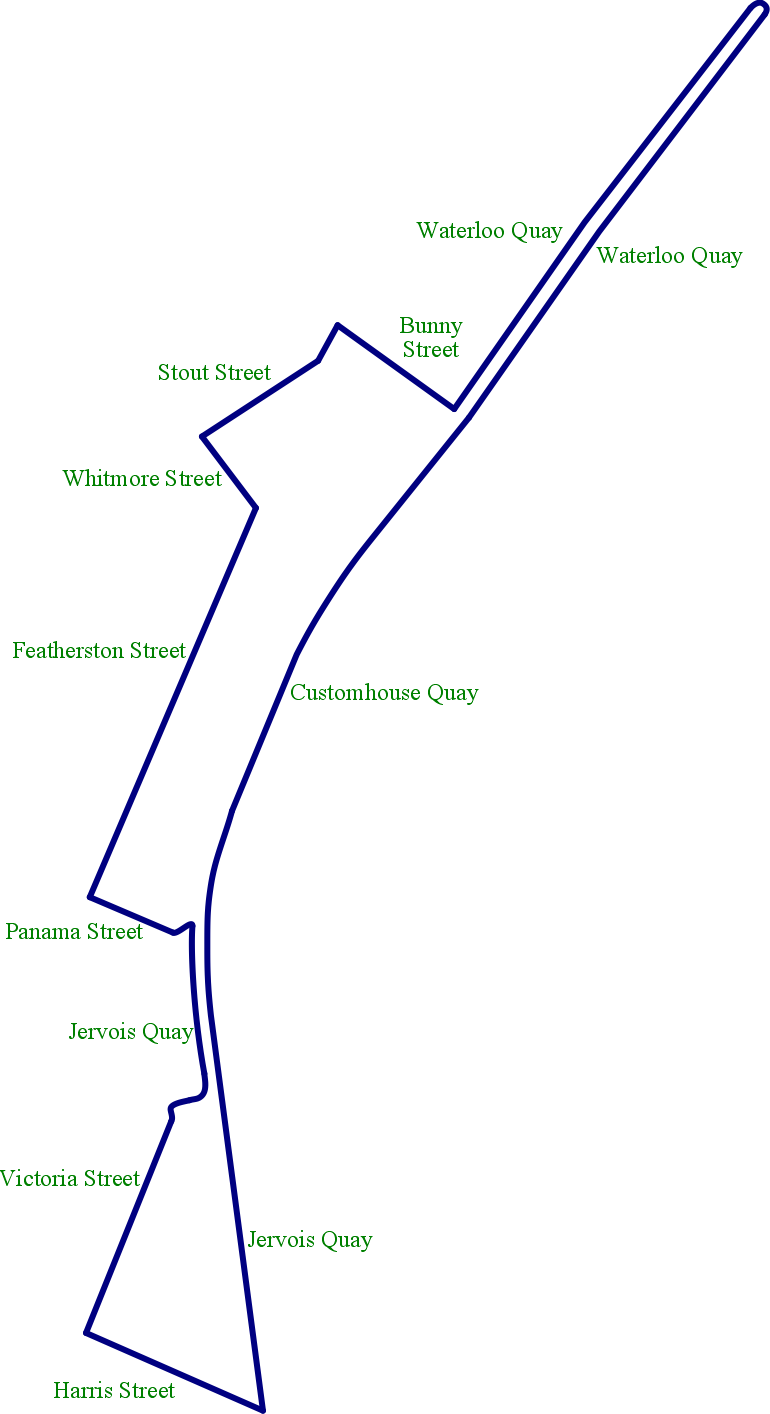
Wellington Street Race 2006 Proposal Number 1 For The New Zealand Round Of The V8 Supercars.

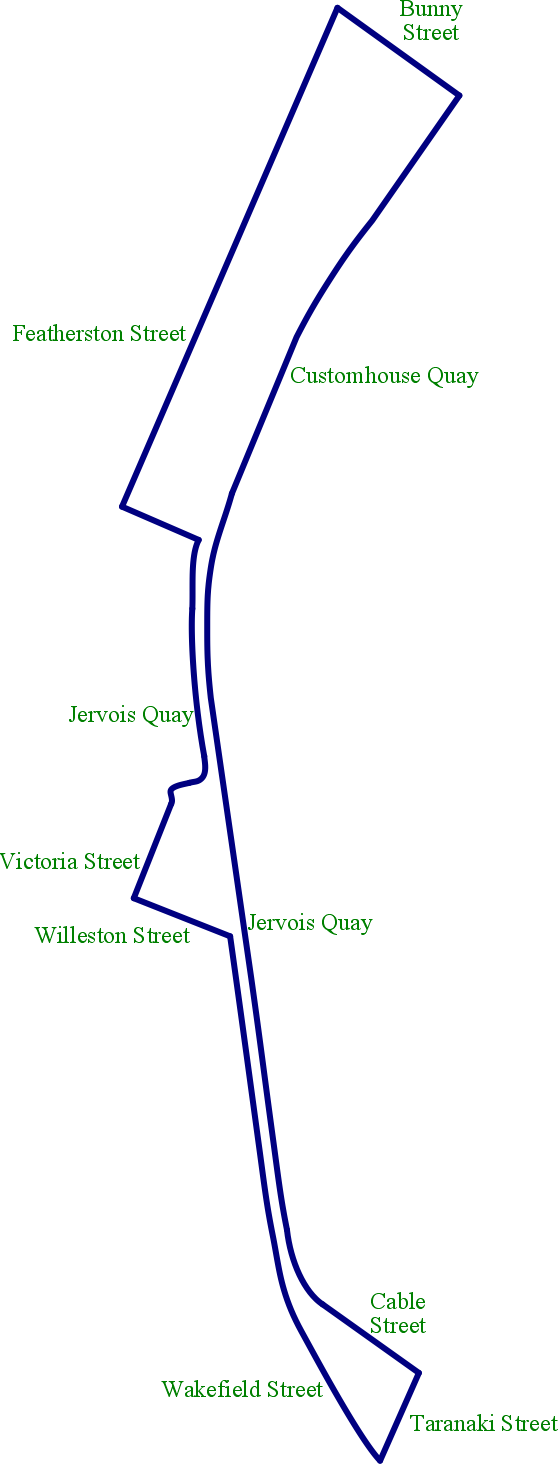
Wellington Street Race 2006 Proposal Number 2 For The New Zealand Round Of The V8 Supercars.

The proposed race was eventually dropped in favour of the Hamilton 400 at the street circuit of Hamilton, which hosted V8 Supercars from 2008 to 2012 before the series returned again to Pukekohe.

== Layout ==
During 1985-1996 the track changed layout many times. The circuit initially ran along Cable Street to the Taranaki Street Gates, and this was extended to the Herd Street Loop for the 1987 WTCC event. The extensions for 1987 also included Horseshoe Hairpin being lengthened. By 1991 the back straight (Jervois Quay) was modified to make a safer turn onto Cable Street. For 1993 the layout was forced to change due to the construction of the Queens Wharf Events Centre and Te Papa (Museum of New Zealand), which meant the loss of the "traditional" layout.

== Lap records ==
The fastest official race lap records at the Wellington Street Circuit are listed as:

Class	Time	Driver	Vehicle	Event
Grand Prix Circuit (1993–1994, 1996): 3.228 km (2.006 mi)
Super Touring	1:35.230	(New Zealand) Paul Radisich	Ford Mondeo Si	1993 Wellington 500
Group B	1:37.890	(New Zealand) Owen Evans	Porsche Carrera RS	1993 Wellington 500
Group N	1:43.820	(New Zealand) Craig Baird	BMW 325i Coupé	1993 Wellington 500
Grand Prix Circuit (1987–1992): 3.228 km (2.006 mi)
Group A	1:28.390	(New Zealand) Jim Richards	Nissan Skyline (BNR32) GT-R	1991 Wellington 500
Group B	1:38.980	(New Zealand) Owen Evans	Porsche 911	1991 Wellington 500
Group N	1:43.460	(New Zealand) Possum Bourne	Subaru Legacy RS	1991 Wellington 500

== Winners ==
Year	Driver/s	Car	Team	Report
1985	(Belgium) Michel Delcourt (New Zealand) Robbie Francevic	Volvo 240T	Mark Petch Motorsport	
1986	(Australia) Peter Brock (Canada) Allan Moffat	Holden VK Commodore; SS Group A	Holden Dealer Team	
1987^{1}	(Australia) Peter Brock (Canada) Allan Moffat	Holden VK Commodore; SS Group A	Holden Dealer Team	
1987^{1}	(West Germany) Klaus Ludwig (West Germany) Klaus Niedzwiedz	Ford Sierra RS500	Eggenberger Motorsport	Report
1988	(Italy) Emanuele Pirro (Italy) Roberto Ravaglia	BMW M3	Schnitzer Motorsport	
1989	(Italy) Emanuele Pirro (Italy) Roberto Ravaglia	BMW M3	Schnitzer Motorsport	
1990	(Italy) Emanuele Pirro (Venezuela) Johnny Cecotto	BMW M3	Schnitzer Motorsport	
1991	(Italy) Emanuele Pirro (Germany) Joachim Winkelhock	BMW M3 Evolution	Schnitzer Motorsport	
1992	(Australia) Tony Longhurst (Australia) Paul Morris	BMW M3 Evolution	LoGaMo Racing	
1993	(New Zealand) Owen Evans (Switzerland) Bruno Eichmann	Porsche 911 RS Cup	Evans European	
1994	(United Kingdom) Tim Harvey	BMW 318i	Motorola Pagers Racing	
1995	Not held			
1996	(Australia) John Bowe	Ford EF Falcon	Dick Johnson Racing	

Notes

- ^1 – Two separate events were held in 1987, the second of which was a round of the 1987 World Touring Car Championship.

== Multiple winners ==
=== By driver ===
Wins	Driver	Years
4	(Italy) Emanuele Pirro	1988, 1989, 1990, 1991
2	(Australia) Peter Brock	1986, 1987
2	(Canada) Allan Moffat	1986, 1987
2	(Italy) Roberto Ravaglia	1988, 1989

=== By team ===
Wins	Team
4	Schnitzer Motorsport
2	Holden Dealer Team

=== By manufacturer ===
Wins	Manufacturer
6	BMW
2	Holden
2	Ford

== Gallery ==
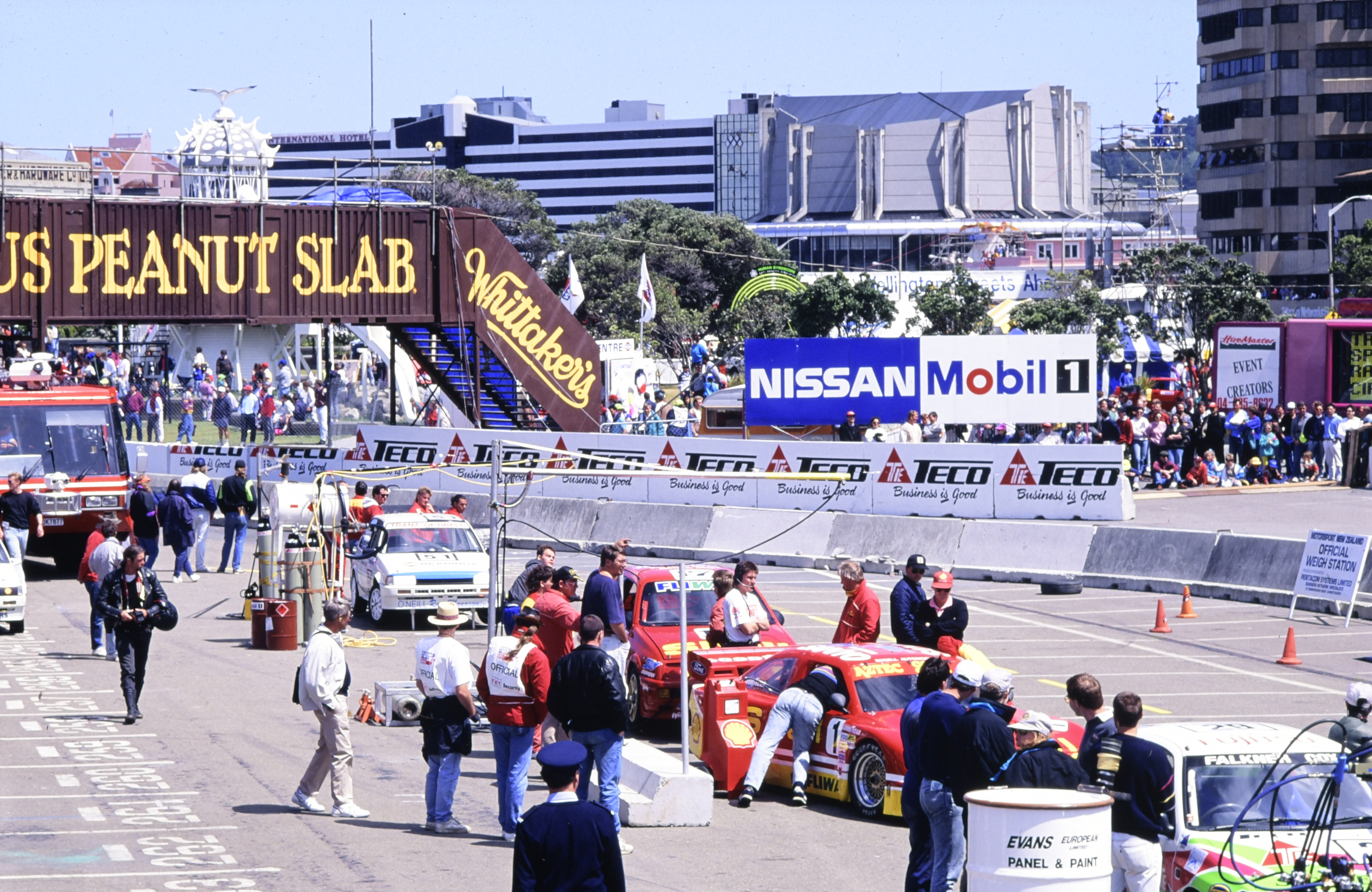
Racing on Jervois Quay, probably 1991

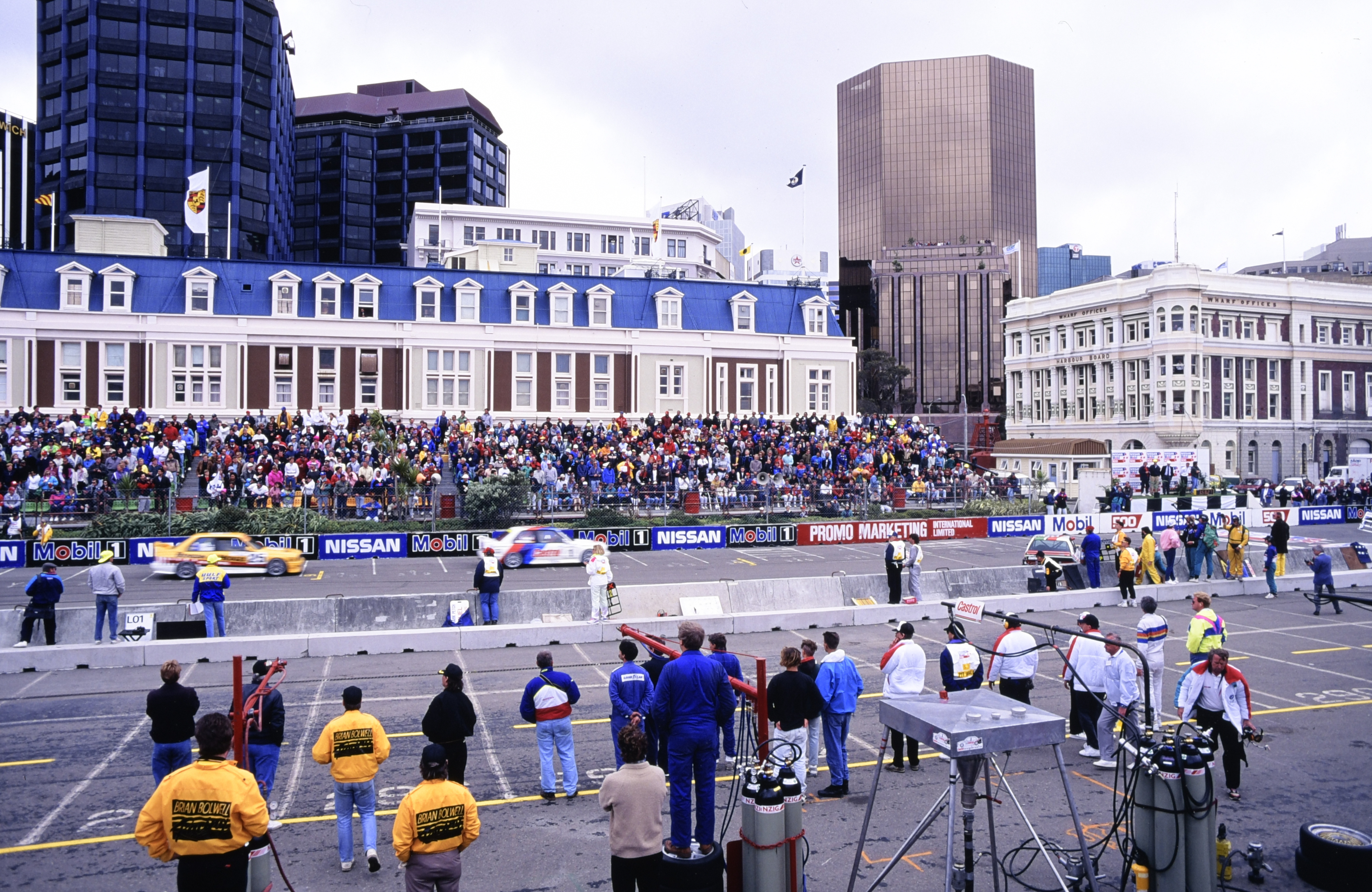
Racing along the waterfront, 1991

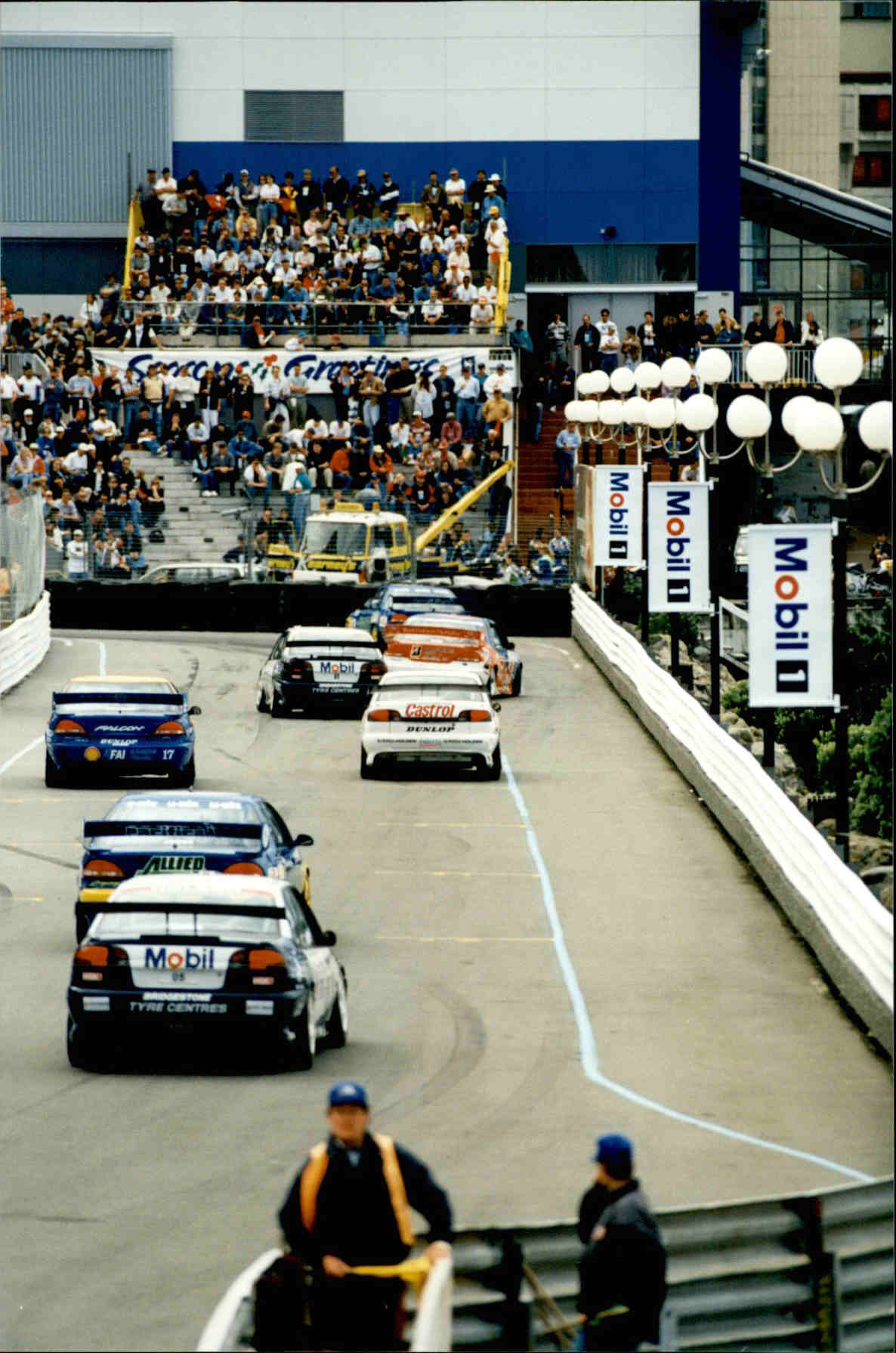
Cars racing alongside Frank Kitts Park, 1996

== See also ==
- Hamilton 400
- Pukekohe 500
- Auckland SuperSprint
