= Steve Soper =

British racing driver (born 1951)

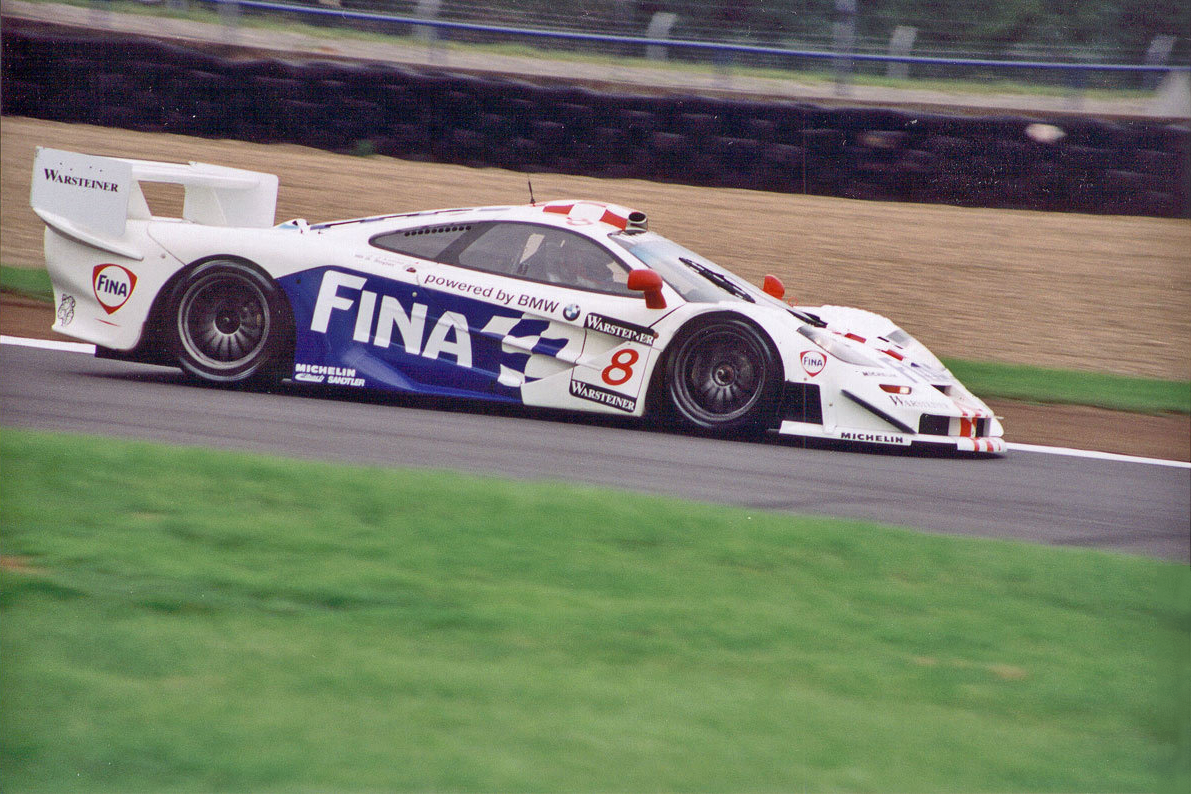
- Soper driving a McLaren F1 GTR at Donington Park in 1997
- Nationality: (United Kingdom) British
- Born: Steven Soper; 27 September 1951 (age 75) Greenford, London, England

British Saloon / Touring Car Championship
- Years active: 1982–1985, 1988–1989, 1991–1994, 2001
- Teams: Hepolite Glacier Racing; Team Sanyo Racing with Esso; Roger Dowson Engineering; Eggenberger Motorsport; BMW Team Finance; M Team Shell Racing with Listerine; BMW Motorsport Team Schnitzer; Peugeot Sport UK
- Starts: 106
- Wins: 14 (5 in class)
- Poles: 14 (2 in class)
- Fastest laps: 13 (5 in class)
- Best finish: 2nd in 1993

Championship titles
- 1995: Japanese Touring Car Championship

Steven Soper (born 27 September 1951) is a British racing driver.

Soper raced in major sports car and touring car categories in the 1980s and 1990s. He was Japanese Touring Car Champion in 1995, and also won the 24 Hours Nürburgring in 1987, the 24 Hours of Spa in 1992 and 1995 and the Guia Race in 1997. He achieved many of his successes through his longest association, with BMW, and is widely regarded as one of the best Touring car racers of all time.

== Career ==
Across just over two decades, Soper won three major races: the 24 Hours Nürburgring in 1987, the 24 Hours of Spa in 1995 and the Guia Race in 1997.

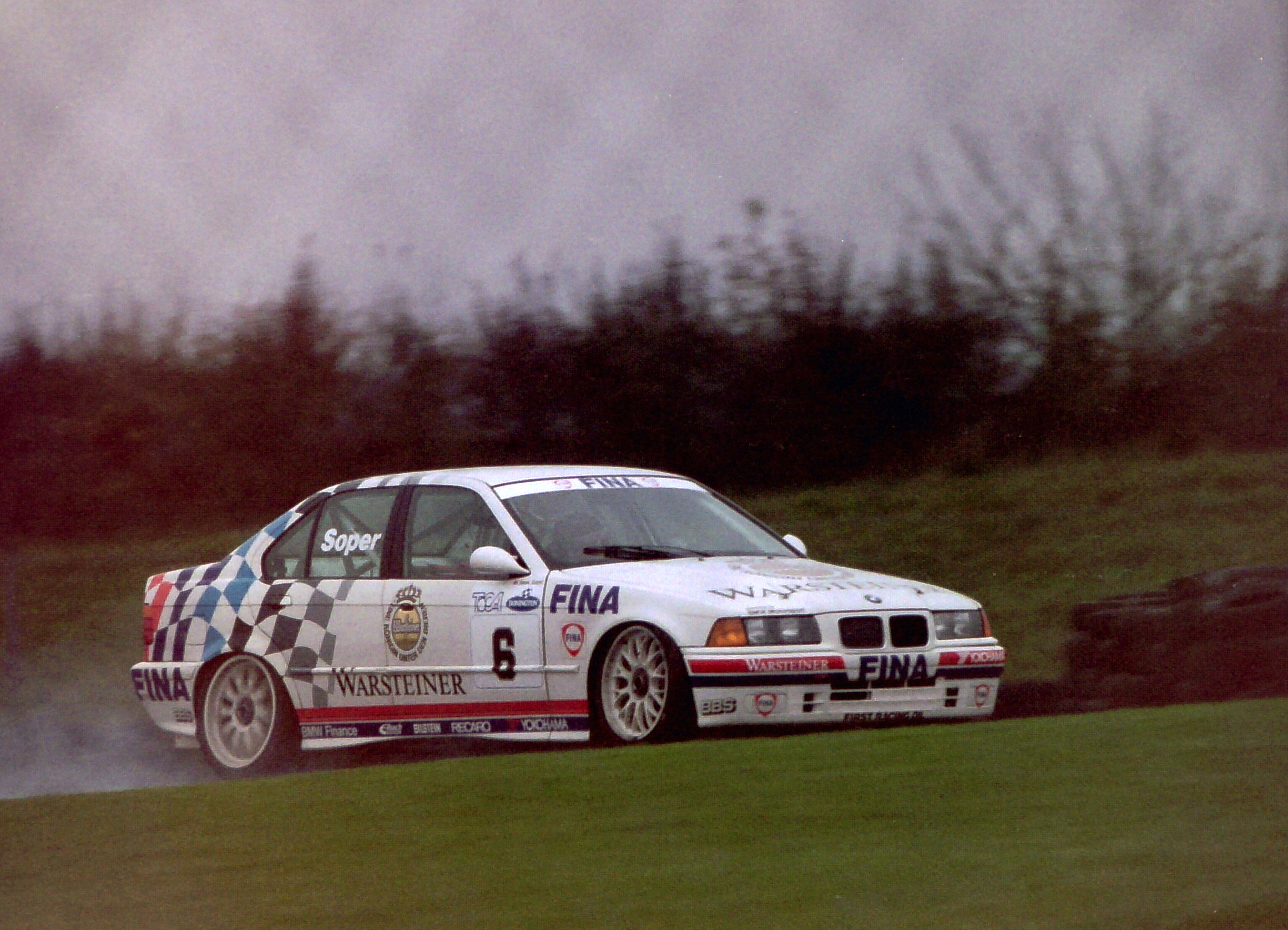
Soper driving for BMW at Donington Park during the 1993 TOCA Shootout.

=== One-Make Racing ===
Soper was successful in one make series, notably winning the inaugural MG Metro Challenge in 1981.

=== Touring Car Racing ===
Soper made his British Saloon Car Championship debut in 1982 in an Austin Metro. His talent was spotted by Tom Walkinshaw and he joined TWR in 1983. He won the championship in his first season with the works Austin Rover team but rival Frank Sytner protested the TWR team and his Rover Vitesse was later deemed illegal due to an issue with the engine installation. TWR was disqualified and the title was awarded to Andy Rouse. He later joined Eggenberger Motorsport and finished as runner-up in the series in 1988 in a Ford Sierra RS500 Cosworth, enjoying many on-track battles with Andy Rouse in the process.

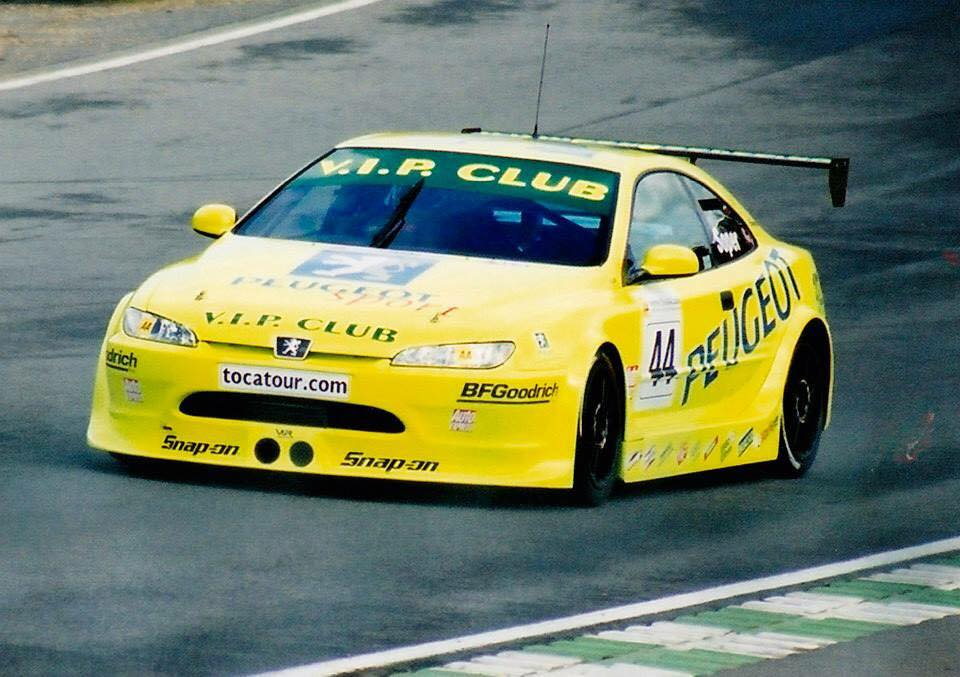
Soper driving for Peugeot during the 2001 British Touring Car Championship season.

Soper challenged for the title in 1991, finishing fourth and in 1993, finishing as runner up behind teammate Joachim Winkelhock for BMW. Soper had led the championship for most of the season but a run of bad luck towards the end of the year damaged his title challenge. During the season finale of the 1992 championship, Soper was involved in the infamous collision with John Cleland, which cost Cleland the title and famously led him to label Soper 'an animal'. 1995 saw Soper race in the Japanese Super Touring championship for Schnitzer BMW, winning the championship outright that year.

Soper raced in the German Super Tourenwagen Cup in 1996, challenging for the title until an incident late in the season with his team mate ended his championship chances. He finished second overall to Emanuele Pirro. In 1997 he came second in the FIA GT Championship. Soper finished fifth driving a Ford Sierra for Eggenberger Motorsport in the one-off World Touring Car Championship in 1987 run under Group A regulations. That year, he won the Bathurst 1000, but was later disqualified for a technical infringement Soper was offered a works drive for BMW, and competed in the night European, Japanese and German Touring Car Championships. During the 1999 24 Hours of Le Mans, he expressed dislike of the 24-hour classic race, established in the early 20th century.

By 2000, Soper fell out of favour with Gerhard Berger, who was in charge of BMW's motorsport operations and retired from racing as he was solely interested in racing BMWs and acquired a BMW dealership in Lincoln. For 2001, he reluctantly made a surprise return to the British Touring Car Championship with Peugeot. The car's build rendered it less successful than the Vauxhall Astra. He finished 6th in a thin field and was advised to retire on medical grounds after a heavy crash in the final round. He completed that year's Macau Guia Race for Peugeot a month after the crash and then hung up his helmet.

In 2013, Soper, who had earned the nickname "Soperman" (with final syllable stress to sound like "superman") from his fans during his career, announced plans, on medical clearance, to race.

In 2005, Soper was ranked as the greatest touring car driver ever by a panel of experts in Motor Sport Magazine. In 2024, Autosport ranked him as the greatest BTCC driver to not have won the title.

== Racing record ==
=== Complete British Saloon / Touring Car Championship results ===
(key) (Races in bold indicate pole position – 1973–1990 in class) (Races in italics indicate fastest lap – 1 point awarded ?–1989 in class) (* signifies that driver lead feature race for at least one lap – 1 point awarded)

Year	Team	Car	Class	1	2	3	4	5	6	7	8	9	10	11	12	13	14	15	16	17	18	19	20	21	22	23	24	25	26	DC	Pts	Class
1982	Hepolite Glacier Racing	Austin Metro 1300 HLS	A	SIL ovr:? cls:3	MAL; Ret†	OUL ovr:6† cls:2†	THR ovr:12 cls:1	THR; Ret	SIL; Ret	DON ovr:10 cls:1	BRH ovr:17 cls:2	DON ovr:9 cls:1	BRH ovr:6 cls:1	SIL ovr:14 cls:1																**3rd**	**65**	**2nd**
1983	Team Sanyo Racing with Esso	Rover Vitesse	A	**SIL** ovr:1 cls:1	**OUL** ovr:3 cls:3	**THR** ovr:7 cls:5	**BRH** ovr:1 cls:1	THR	SIL ovr:1 cls:1	DON; Ret	SIL ovr:1 cls:1	DON ovr:1 cls:1	**BRH** ovr:2 cls:2	SIL ovr:2 cls:2																**DSQ**	**68**	**DSQ**
1984	Team Sanyo Racing with Esso	Rover Vitesse	A	DON ovr:2 cls:2	SIL	OUL	THR	THR ovr:1 cls:1	SIL	SNE	BRH	BRH	DON	SIL																WD	0	WD
1985	Roger Dowson Engineering	MG Metro Turbo	B	SIL; Ret	OUL	THR	DON	THR	SIL	DON	SIL	SNE	BRH	BRH	SIL															NC	0	NC
1988	Eggenberger Motorsport	Ford Sierra RS500	A	SIL	OUL; DNA	**THR** ovr:1 cls:1	DON	THR	SIL	SIL	BRH ovr:2 cls:2	SNE	BRH	**BIR**; C	**DON** ovr:2 cls:2	SIL														15th	21	6th
1989	BMW Team Finance	BMW M3	B	OUL	SIL	THR	DON ovr:11‡ cls:4‡	THR	SIL	SIL	BRH	SNE	BRH	BIR	DON	SIL														43rd	4	10th
1991	BMW Team Finance	BMW M3		**SIL**; 18	SNE	**DON**; 1	THR	SIL	BRH	**SIL**; 1	DON; 1; 2	DON; 2 Ret	OUL; 3	BRH; 1; 6	BRH; 2 Ret	DON	THR; 1	SIL												4th	96	
1992	M Team Shell Racing with Listerine	BMW 318is		SIL	THR; 5	OUL; 8	SNE	BRH; 3	DON; 1; 17	DON; 2; 3	SIL	KNO; 1; 4	KNO; 2; 6	PEM; 2	**BRH**; **1** Ret	BRH; 2; 5	DON; 2	SIL; Ret												6th	77	
1993	BMW Motorsport Team	BMW 318i		**SIL**; 1	**DON**; 3	SNE; 1	DON; 3	OUL; Ret	BRH; 1; 4	BRH; 2; 1	PEM; 3	SIL; Ret	KNO; 1; 12	KNO; 2; 8	OUL; 2	BRH; 3	THR; 6	DON; 1 Ret	DON; 2; 5	SIL; 5										**2nd**	**150**	
1994	BMW Motorsport Team Schnitzer	BMW 318i		THR; 4	BRH; 1; 10	BRH; 2; 6	SNE; 8	SIL; 1	SIL; 2	OUL; 4	DON; 1	DON; 2	BRH; 1; 4	BRH; 2; 14	SIL	KNO; 1; 3	KNO; 2; 1	OUL	BRH; 1; 5	BRH; 2; 4	SIL; 1; 22	SIL; 2; 5	DON; 1; 12	DON; 2 Ret						7th	102	
2001	Peugeot Sport UK	Peugeot 406 Coupé	T	BRH; 1; 7†	BRH; 2 ovr:4* cls:4	THR; 1 Ret	THR; 2 Ret	OUL; 1 ovr:16 cls:5	OUL; 2 Ret	SIL; 1 ovr:11 cls:6	SIL; 2 ovr:6 cls:6	MON; 1 ovr:4 cls:3	MON; 2 Ret	DON; 1 ovr:6 cls:6	DON; 2 ovr:5* cls:5	KNO; 1 Ret	KNO; 2 ovr:4* cls:4	SNE; 1 ovr:20 cls:5	SNE; 2 ovr:4 cls:4	CRO; 1 ovr:12 cls:5	CRO; 2 Ret	OUL; 1 Ret	OUL; 2 Ret*	SIL; 1 ovr:20 cls:10	SIL; 2 ovr:8 cls:8	DON; 1 ovr:20 cls:9	DON; 2 Ret	BRH; 1 Ret	BRH; 2 DNS	6th	93	

1. – Race was stopped due to heavy rain. No points were awarded.

† Events with 2 races staged for the different classes.

‡ Endurance driver.

=== Complete European Touring Car Championship results ===
(key) (Races in bold indicate pole position) (Races in italics indicate fastest lap)

Year	Team	Car	1	2	3	4	5	6	7	8	9	10	11	12	13	14	DC	Points
1986	(Switzerland) Eggenberger Motorsport	Ford Sierra XR4Ti	MNZ; Ret	DON; Ret	HOC; 3	MIS; Ret	AND	**BRN**; Ret	ZEL; Ret	NUR; Ret	SPA; 7	SIL; Ret	NOG; 4	ZOL; 11	JAR; Ret	EST; 1	30th	69
1987	(Switzerland) Ford Texaco Racing Team	Ford Sierra RS Cosworth	DON	EST; 2†	AND	ZOL; 1†	ZEL	IMO	NOG								NC	0
1988	(Switzerland) Ford Texaco Racing Team	Ford Sierra RS500	**MNZ**; 1	DON; Ret	EST; 1	JAR; 1	DIJ; 1	VAL; Ret	NUR; 1	SPA; 4	ZOL; Ret	SIL; 2	**NOG**; 1				**2nd**	**290**

† Not eligible for points.

=== Complete World Touring Car Championship results ===
(key) (Races in bold indicate pole position) (Races in italics indicate fastest lap)

Year	Team	Car	1	2	3	4	5	6	7	8	9	10	11	DC	Points
1987	(Switzerland) Ford Texaco Racing Team	Ford Sierra RS Cosworth	MNZ; DSQ	JAR ovr:5 cls:6	DIJ ovr:3 cls:1	**NUR**; Ret	SPA; Ret							5th	193
1987	(Switzerland) Ford Texaco Racing Team	Ford Sierra RS500						BNO ovr:2 cls:2	**SIL** ovr:13 cls:5	BAT; DSQ	CLD ovr:1 cls:1	WEL ovr:3 cls:2	FJI ovr:5 cls:3	5th	193

* Overall race position shown. Registered WTCC points paying position may differ.

=== Complete Deutsche Tourenwagen Meisterschaft results ===
(key) (Races in bold indicate pole position) (Races in italics indicate fastest lap)

Year	Team	Car	1	2	3	4	5	6	7	8	9	10	11	12	13	14	15	16	17	18	19	20	21	22	23	24	DC	Pts
1987	Ford Grab Motorsport	Ford Sierra XR4Ti	HOC	ZOL	NÜR	AVU	MFA	NOR	NÜR	WUN	DIE	SAL; 3															27th	16
1988	Ford Ringhausen Motorsport	Ford Sierra RS500	ZOL; 1	ZOL; 2	HOC; 1	HOC; 2	NÜR; 1	NÜR; 2	BRN; 1	BRN; 2	AVU; 1	AVU; 2	MFA; 1	MFA; 2	NÜR; 1	NÜR; 2	NOR; 1 Ret	NOR; 2; 25	WUN; 1; 2	WUN; 2; 2	SAL; 1	SAL; 2	HUN; 1	HUN; 2	HOC; 1	HOC; 2	24th	36
1989	BMW M Team Zakspeed	BMW M3 Evo	ZOL; 1; 3	ZOL; 2; 18	HOC; 1; 2	HOC; 2 Ret	NÜR; 1; 1	NÜR; 2; 1	MFA; 1; 4	MFA; 2; 4	AVU; 1; 2	AVU; 2; 4	NÜR; 1; 5	NÜR; 2; 6	NOR; 1; 10	NOR; 2 Ret	HOC; 1; 16	HOC; 2 Ret	DIE; 1; 4	DIE; 2; 13	NÜR; 1; 5	NÜR; 2; 2	HOC; 1; 16	HOC; 2; 22			5th	233
1990	BMW M Team Bigazzi	BMW M3 Sport Evo	ZOL; 1; 2	ZOL; 2 Ret	HOC; 1; 2	HOC; 2 Ret	NÜR; 1; 1	NÜR; 2; 1	AVU; 1; 14	AVU; 2; 8	MFA; 1; 4	MFA; 2; 2	WUN; 1; 4	WUN; 2; 8	NÜR; 1; 3	NÜR; 2 Ret	NOR; 1; 11	NOR; 2; 10	DIE; 1; 8	DIE; 2; 20	NÜR; 1; 10	NÜR; 2; 2	HOC; 1; 6	HOC; 2; 8			4th	152
1991	BMW M Team Bigazzi	BMW M3 Sport Evo	ZOL; 1; 5	ZOL; 2; 15	HOC; 1; 1	HOC; 2; 1	NÜR; 1 Ret	NÜR; 2; 16	AVU; 1; 5	AVU; 2; 4	WUN; 1; 20	WUN; 2; 6	NOR; 1; 9	NOR; 2; 4	DIE; 1; 2	DIE; 2; 1	NÜR; 1; 5	NÜR; 2; 14	ALE; 1; 6	ALE; 2; 16	HOC; 1 Ret	HOC; 2; 29	BRN; 1; 2	BRN; 2; 1	DON; 1; 2	DON; 2; 2	5th	133
1992	BMW M Team Bigazzi	BMW M3 Sport Evo	ZOL; 1; 4	ZOL; 2; 13	NÜR; 1 Ret	NÜR; 2; 7	WUN; 1; 24	WUN; 2 Ret	AVU; 1; 1	AVU; 2; 9	HOC; 1; 4	HOC; 2; 5	NÜR; 1; 6	NÜR; 2; 8	NOR; 1; 4	NOR; 2; 1	BRN; 1 Ret	BRN; 2 Ret	DIE; 1 Ret	DIE; 2; 7	ALE; 1; 5	ALE; 2; 7	NÜR; 1	NÜR; 2	HOC; 1 NC	HOC; 2 Ret	9th	109

=== Complete Asia-Pacific Touring Car Championship results ===
(key) (Races in bold indicate pole position) (Races in italics indicate fastest lap)

Year	Team	Car	1	2	3	4	5	6	7	8	9	10	11	12	DC	Points
1988	(Australia) Miedecke Motorsport	Ford Sierra RS500	BAT; Ret	WEL; NC	**PUK**; 1†	FUJ									NC	0
1994	(Germany) BMW Team Schnitzer	BMW 318i	FUJ; 1 Ret	FUJ; 2; 7	MAC; 1; 2	MAC; 2; 2	SEN; 1 C	SEN; 2 C	WEL; 1; 4	WEL; 2 Ret	CLD; 1 C	CLD; 2 C	CHE; 1 C	CHE; 2 C	3rd	?

† Not eligible for points.

=== Complete Italian Touring Car Championship results ===
(key) (Races in bold indicate pole position) (Races in italics indicate fastest lap)

Year	Team	Car	Class	1	2	3	4	5	6	7	8	9	10	11	12	13	14	15	16	17	18	19	20	Pos.	Pts
1990	Bigazzi M Team	BMW M3 Sport Evolution	A1	MNZ; 1; 2	MNZ; 2; 4	VAR; 1	VAR; 2	PER; 2	PER; 1	MAG; 1	MAG; 2	VAL; 1	VAL; 2	MIS; 1	MIS; 2	MIS; 1	MIS; 2	IMO; 1; 3	IMO; 2; 2	VAR; 1	VAR; 2	MNZ; 1 Ret	MNZ; 2; 6	13th	58
1992	CiBiEmme Engineering	BMW M3 Sport Evolution	S1	MNZ; 1; 3	MNZ; 2; 9	MAG; 1	MAG; 2	MUG; 1	MUG; 2	BIN; 1	BIN; 2	VAL; 1	VAL; 2	IMO; 1	IMO; 2	MIS; 1	MIS; 2	PER; 1	PER; 2	VAR; 1	VAR; 2	MNZ; 1	MNZ; 2	16th	14
1996	Scuderia Bigazzi	BMW 320i		MUG; 1	MUG; 2	MAG; 1	MAG; 2	MNZ; 1	MNZ; 2	BIN; 1	BIN; 2	MIS; 1	MIS; 2	IMO; 1	IMO; 2	PER; 1	PER; 2	PER; 1	PER; 2	VAR; 1	VAR; 2	VAL; 1; 8	VAL; 2; 2	14th	18

=== Complete Japanese Touring Car Championship results ===
(key) (Races in bold indicate pole position) (Races in italics indicate fastest lap)

Year	Team	Car	1	2	3	4	5	6	7	8	9	10	11	12	13	14	15	16	17	18	DC	Pts
1994	BMW Team Schnitzer	BMW 318i	AUT; 1 Ret	AUT; 2; 7	SUG; 1; 3	SUG; 2; 1	TOK; 1; 6	TOK; 2; 9	**SUZ**; **1**; 2	SUZ; 2; 2	MIN; 1; 1	**MIN**; **2**; 1	AID; 1; 9	AID; 2; 3	**TSU**; **1** Ret	TSU; 2 DNS	SEN; 1; 1	**SEN**; **2**; 1	FUJ; 1 Ret	FUJ; 2; 7	**3rd**	**132**
1995	BMW Team Schnitzer	BMW 318i	FUJ; 1; 10	FUJ; 2; 5	SUG; 1; 4	SUG; 2; 4	TOK; 1; 3	TOK; 2; 3	SUZ; 1; 2	SUZ; 2; 1	MIN; 1; 9	MIN; 2; 2	AID; 1; 3	AID; 2; 9	SEN; 1; 3	SEN; 2; 1	**FUJ**; **1**; 1	**FUJ**; **2**; 2			**1st**	**124**

=== Complete Super Tourenwagen Cup results ===
(key) (Races in bold indicate pole position; races in italics indicate fastest lap)

Year	Team	Car	1	2	3	4	5	6	7	8	9	10	11	12	13	14	15	16	17	18	19	20	Pos	Pts
1995	BMW Team Schnitzer	BMW 318is	ZOL; 1	ZOL; 2	SPA; 1	SPA; 2	ÖST; 1	ÖST; 2	HOC; 1	HOC; 2	NÜR; 1	NÜR; 2	SAL; 1; 11	SAL; 2; 7	AVU; 1; 22	AVU; 2; 20	NÜR; 1; 3	NÜR; 2; 4					21st	90
1996	BMW Team Bigazzi	BMW 320i	ZOL; 1; 7	ZOL; 2; 4	ASS; 1; 1	ASS; 2; 3	HOC; 1; 6	HOC; 2; 3	SAC; 1; 5	SAC; 2; 2	WUN; 1; 1	WUN; 2; 3	ZWE; 1; 3	ZWE; 2; 2	SAL; 1; 1	SAL; 2; 2	AVU; 1 Ret	AVU; 2; 6	NÜR; 1; 13	NÜR; 2 Ret			2nd	491
1997	Isert BMW-Team	BMW 320i	HOC; 1	HOC; 2	ZOL; 1	ZOL; 2	NÜR; 1	NÜR; 2	SAC; 1	SAC; 2	NOR; 1	NOR; 2	WUN; 1	WUN; 2	ZWE; 1	ZWE; 2	SAL; 1	SAL; 2	REG; 1	REG; 2	NÜR; 1; 16	NÜR; 2; 12	30th	23

=== Complete Bathurst 1000 results ===
Year	Team	Co-Drivers	Car	Class	Laps	Pos.	Class Pos.
1984	(United Kingdom) Mobil Rover Racing	(Australia) Ron Dickson	Rover Vitesse	Group A	116	29th	8th
1987*	(Switzerland) Ford Texaco Racing Team	(Belgium) Pierre Dieudonné	Ford Sierra RS500	1	161	DSQ	DSQ
1988	(Australia) Miedecke Motorsport	(Australia) Andrew Miedecke	Ford Sierra RS500	A	102	DNF	DNF
1993	(Australia) Benson & Hedges Racing	(Australia) Tony Longhurst	BMW M3 Evolution	A	79	DNF	DNF

* 1987 finished 1st on the road but later disqualified.

=== 24 Hours of Le Mans results ===
Year	Team	Co-Drivers	Car	Class	Laps	Pos.	Class Pos.
1983	(Japan) Mazdaspeed	(United Kingdom) Jeff Allam (United Kingdom) James Weaver	Mazda 717C	C Jr.	267	18th	**2nd**
1996	(Italy) Team Bigazzi (Germany) Team BMW Motorsport	(France) Jacques Laffite (Belgium) Marc Duez	McLaren F1 GTR	GT1	318	11th	9th
1997	(Germany) Team BMW Motorsport (Germany) BMW Team Schnitzer	(Finland) JJ Lehto (Brazil) Nelson Piquet	McLaren F1 GTR	GT1	236	DNF	DNF
1998	(Germany) Team BMW Motorsport	(Germany) Hans-Joachim Stuck (Denmark) Tom Kristensen	BMW V12 LM	LMP1	60	DNF	DNF
1999	(United Kingdom) Price+Bscher	(Germany) Thomas Bscher (United States) Bill Auberlen	BMW V12 LM	LMP	345	5th	4th

=== Macau Grand Prix Guia Race results ===
Year	Team	Car	Class	Heat 1	Heat 2	Pos.
1993	(Germany) Watson’s Team Schnitzer	BMW 318i	FIA Class 2	-	-	DNF
1994	(Germany) San Miguel Team Schnitzer	BMW 318is	FIA Class 2	2nd	2nd	2nd
1995	(Germany) BMW Team Schnitzer	BMW 318is	FIA Class 2	5th	2nd	2nd
1996	(Italy) BMW Team Bigazzi	BMW 320i	FIA Class 2	DNF	1st	12th
1997	(Italy) BMW Team Bigazzi	BMW 320i	FIA Class 2	1st	1st	1st
1998	(Germany) BMW Team Schnitzer	BMW 320i	FIA Class 2	1st	1st	1st
2001	(United Kingdom) WK Longman Racing	Peugeot 306	Super Production	3rd	DNF	-

Sporting positions
Preceded by Masanori Sekiya	Japanese Touring Car Championship; Champion; 1995	Succeeded by Naoki Hattori
Preceded by Frank Biela	Guia Race winner 1997	Succeeded by Joachim Winkelhock
