= 1994 Asia-Pacific Touring Car Championship =

Seasons
- ← 1988 none →

The 1994 FIA Asia-Pacific Touring Car Championship was a motorsport championship for Super Touring racing cars. This was the second running of the championship and the champion was Joachim Winkelhock who drove for Schnitzer Motorsport.

== Schedule ==
The original schedule contained six rounds, but due to logistical and financial problems, only three rounds, Japan, Macau and New Zealand were run. The Japanese round was also part of that year's JTCC schedule.

Original schedule:

Date	Circuit	Race 1 winner	Race 2 winner	Results
30 October	(Japan) Fuji	(Japan) Kazuyoshi Hoshino	(United Kingdom) Anthony Reid	
20 November	Macau	(Germany) Joachim Winkelhock	(Germany) Joachim Winkelhock	Report
27 November	(Indonesia) Sentul	cancelled		
4 December	(New Zealand) Wellington	(Germany) Joachim Winkelhock	(United Kingdom) Tim Harvey	
11 December	(Australia) Calder	cancelled		
18 December	(India) Madras	cancelled		

== Teams and drivers ==
Teams and drivers list:

Team	No.	Driver	Car	Rounds
BMW Motorsport Team Schnitzer	1	(Germany) Joachim Winkelhock	BMW 318is	1-2, 4
BMW Motorsport Team Schnitzer	2	(United Kingdom) Steve Soper	BMW 318is	1-2, 4
BMW Motorsport Team Schnitzer	3	(Hong Kong) Charles Kwan	BMW 318is	2
Motorola Pagers	5	(United Kingdom) Tim Harvey	BMW 318is	2, 4
Motorola Pagers	51	(United Kingdom) Tim Harvey	BMW 318is	1
Motorola Pagers	6	(United Kingdom) Justin Bell	BMW 318is	1-2, 4
Nismo	31	(Japan) Akira Iida	Nissan Sunny	1
Nismo	32	(Japan) Masahiko Kageyama	Nissan Sunny	1
Nismo	32	(Japan) Toshio Suzuki	Nissan Sunny	2, 4
Gianfranco Team	9	(Portugal) Carlos Rodrigues	Ford Sierra Sapphire	2
Giriox Racing	11	(France) Fabien Giroix	SEAT Toledo GT	2
Lauderbach Team	12	(Macau) Rui Valente	Opel Astra	2
Macau Grand Prix entries
Nismo	7	(Japan) Masahiro Hasemi	Nissan Primera eGT	2
Hyundai Australia	8	(Australia) Colin Bond	Hyundai Lantra	2
TPM Opel Motorsport	10	(Portugal) Ni Amorim	Opel Vectra	2
–	14	(Hong Kong) Lao Kwok Wah	Toyota Corolla	2
Macau Racing Team	15	(Hong Kong) Cheung Hoo Kong	Toyota Corolla	2
Macau Racing Team	91	(United Kingdom) Brian Whillock	Toyota Corolla	2
PKK Racing Team	17	(Hong Kong) Chan Chi Wah	Honda Civic	2
PKK Racing Team	20	(Hong Kong) Albert Poon	Honda Civic	2
–	18	(Hong Kong) Lo Hung Pui	Toyota Corolla	2
Tomato Racing Team	22	(Hong Kong) David Leung	Honda Civic	2
Tomato Racing Team	26	(Hong Kong) Chu Yee Ping	Toyota Corolla	2
–	23	(Hong Kong) To Tat Wah	Honda Civic	2
–	25	(Hong Kong) Lei Chong Seng	Honda Civic	2
Kingston Racing Team	35	(Hong Kong) Ricky Mo	Toyota Corolla	2
Kingston Racing Team	92	(Hong Kong) Paul Fan	Toyota Corolla	2
Toyota Team TOM'S	36	(Denmark) Tom Kristensen	Toyota Corona	2
–	38	(Macau) Rui Clemente	Toyota Corolla	2
–	39	(Hong Kong) Chan Wai Man	Toyota Corolla	2
–	53	(Hong Kong) Lau Sui Ching	Honda Civic	2
–	66	(Hong Kong) Yang Li Chin	Honda Civic	2
HKS	87	(United Kingdom) Anthony Reid	Opel Vectra	2
AAI Racing Team	88	(Hong Kong) Yeung Ma Chuen	Honda Civic	2
IMSP	89	(Hong Kong) Danny Stacy Chau	Honda Civic	2
