= Super Touring =

Touring car racing specification

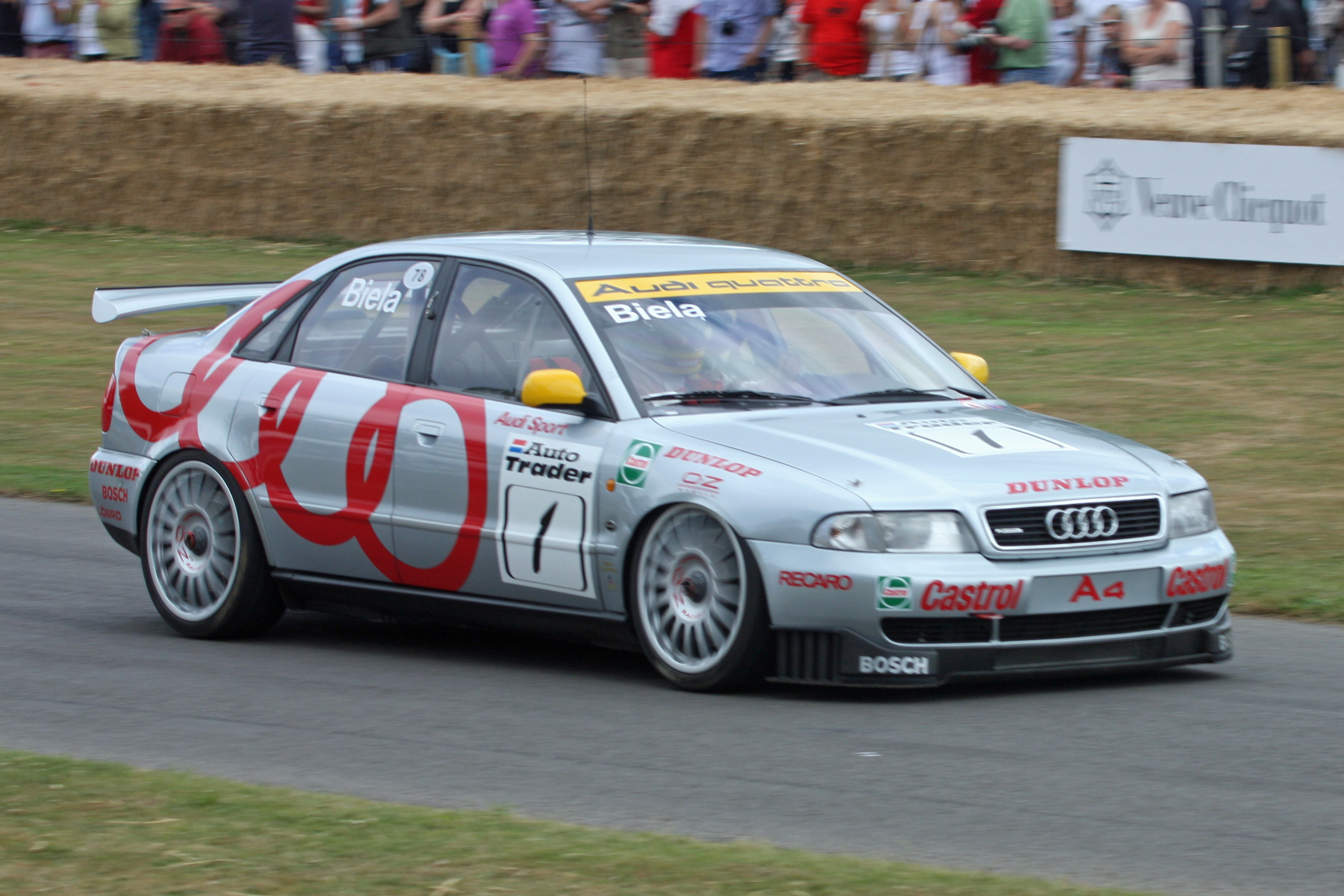
1996 Audi A4 Quattro BTCC

Super Touring, Class 2 or Class II was a motor racing touring car category defined by the Fédération Internationale de l'Automobile (FIA) for national touring car racing in 1993. It was based on the "2 litre Touring Car Formula" created for the British Touring Car Championship (BTCC) in 1990. The FIA organised a World Cup for the category each year from 1993 to 1995, and adopted the term super tourer from 1995.

Super Touring replaced Group A as the norm in nearly every touring car championship across the world, but escalating costs, and the withdrawal of works teams caused the category to collapse in the late 1990s because of the loosely regulated aerodynamics required the team to invest resources equivalent as a professional Formula 1 team, and the 8,500 rpm speed limit required the team to use extremely unusual construction in engine modifications to allow the engine to break through more than 300 horsepower.

An example for this was the German Super Tourenwagen Cup (STW) series, which ran from 1994 to 1999, filling a void left after the end of the 2.5-litre V6-powered Deutsche Tourenwagen Meisterschaft (DTM) in 1996. In 2000, the Deutsche Tourenwagen Masters (keeping the "DTM" acronym) resumed with 4.0-litre V8-powered cars.

== Regulations ==
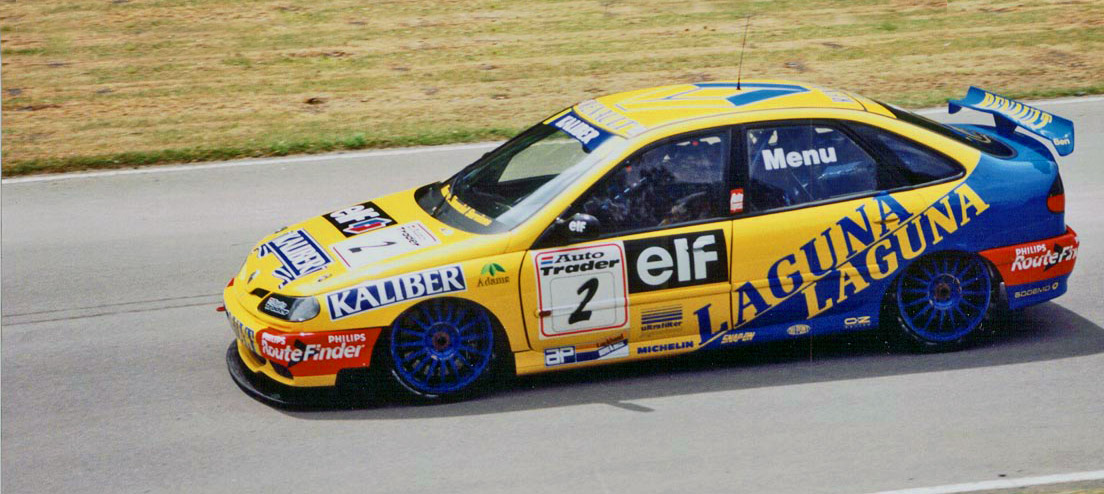
Renault Laguna built to Super Touring regulations competing in the British Touring Car Championship

The Super Touring cars were required to be a minimum of 4.20 metres (13.8 ft) in length, with four doors, effectively requiring a small family saloon car as a minimum. No more than 2 litres engine capacity, maximum of six cylinders were permitted, and the engine was required to be naturally aspirated. Only two wheels could be driven and steered. For homologation, initially at least 2,500 units of the model used must have been produced. In 1995, in a bid to counter the increasing numbers of homologation specials, this number was increased to at least 25,000 units.

There was no restriction on body size and doors until 1993, when it was changed to only allow cars with a minimum of four doors and no smaller than the Euro NCAP 'Small Family Car' class, although 'Large Family Car' tends to dominate the category. Until 1995, teams were only permitted to fit aerodynamic device that were available through dealers, but that changed when, in 1994 BTCC season, Alfa Romeo entered a 155 with Gabriele Tarquini and Giampiero Simoni as drivers. The car had a front spoiler with a bottom piece that could be unscrewed and moved forward, acting as a splitter, and a rear spoiler with a pair of extensions, giving the car more downforce. When Alfa Romeo won the first five rounds, Ford, supported by Vauxhall, made a complaint to the race stewards. TOCA soon decided the aero devices were illegal and Alfa Romeo were stripped of the points they earned at Snetterton and Silverstone (although this decision was later reversed by appeal) and in return, walked out from the Oulton Park race. After this, Alfa were forced to run their spoilers in the retracted position (the position in which the spoilers were fitted on the road going version, the Alfa 155 Silverstone – of which only 2,500 cars were homologated to allow the use of the aerodynamic devices and higher rev limits for a 1.8-litre car – though the road car was sold with two unfitted spoiler extension brackets). In the meantime, Renault and BMW responded by introducing their own limited edition road cars (Laguna Airflow and 318is, respectively) to enable them to run with oversized aerodynamic aids; Renault would win the Oulton Park race that Alfa Romeo had walked out. Soon after that, the FIA changed the regulation in all series to increase minimum number of produced road cars for homologation to 25,000, and allowing cars to only use non-production aerodynamic devices with a restricted size.

Restrictions varied depending on body type, with Volvo having to revert from the 850 Estate to their four-door saloon model the following season when they found themselves to be disadvantaged by the new rules. In the Italian Supertourismo category, teams entered extended spoilers without complaints.

Some series however, would change the rules to suit crowd demands and competition from rival series. One example was the Japanese Touring Car Championship (JTCC), which made increases to body width and exhaust noise while restricting front aerodynamic devices in 1997 (which allowed Toyota to use the larger Toyota Chaser); it ultimately backfired when Nissan and Honda left the series at the end of the season, leaving Toyota as the only manufacturer that competed. In 1999, a new formula using spaceframe cars came to nothing, and the series was abandoned altogether, as by then Japan's big three all had works entries in the then-JGTC.

In Australia, the series began in 1993 when the Group A regulations for the Australian Touring Car Championship series was replaced by Supercars Group 3A Formula (known as V8 Supercars from 1997 onwards) and Super Touring. The advent of a new management structure and telecast arrangement for V8 Supercars put them in conflict with Bathurst 1000 organisers. Super Touring were offered the chance to compete at Bathurst after race organisers could not come to terms with V8 Supercars. Bathurst City Council and V8 Supercars came to a separate arrangement to host their own breakaway "Australian 1000 Classic" race. Super Touring did not become a viable option, and the third and final race was transformed into a motorsport carnival, with several categories attending and the Super Touring event halved to 500 kilometres (310 mi), before collapsing in the aftermath of the 1999 race. In 2000, in the absence of a rival, the V8 Supercars event took up the Bathurst 1000 name.

During the Super Touring's long run, the category suffered two fatal accidents. In 1995, Gregg Hansford at Phillip Island, and Kieth O'dor at Avus, were involved in fatal accidents as a result of a broken neck caused by their cars' being hit side-on. Soon after, rollcages in competition cars with built-in side impact bars, and seats with head restraints on the side would become mandatory.

One reason for Super Touring's demise was the cost of preparing a car for competition. In 1990, a Vauxhall Cavalier cost £60,000. By the later part of the 1990s a similar car with more sophisticated aerodynamics device and telemetry cost £250,000.

The later World Touring Car Championship Super 2000 regulations were inspired by the Super Touring regulations, with production-based four-door saloons powered by 2.0-litre engines. Wider wheel arches are allowed to Install even though production vehicles that are not equipped, so the team doesn’t have to expand the wheel arches inwards and redesign the suspension layout in order to fit wider tires without widening the body width, as was the case during the super touring era, which would lead to higher costs due to over engineering.

Although it bears no resemblance to its predecessor, the "Super Touring" name was retained by the Championnat de France de Supertourisme for their 3.0-litre tube frame cars.

== List of championships that used the Super Touring formula ==
Major championships that used the Super Touring formula
1991	1992	1993	1994	1995	1996	1997	1998	1999	2000	2001	2002
British Touring Car Championship
			Championnat de France de Supertourisme
			Italian Superturismo Championship
			Touring Car World Cup
							Copa de las Naciones
				Japanese Touring Car Championship
				Super Tourenwagen Cup
				Belgian Procar Championship
						Swedish Touring Car Championship
				Campeonato de España de Turismos
			Portuguese Touring Car Championship
						Central European Supertouring Car Championship
				South African Touring Car Championship
				Asia-Pacific Touring Car Championship		South East Asian Touring Car Challenge
			Australian Super Touring Championship
				New Zealand Touring Car Championship
						North American Touring Car Championship
										European Touring Car Championship
1991	1992	1993	1994	1995	1996	1997	1998	1999	2000	2001	2002

== List of Supertouring homologated cars ==
Country	Marque	Model	Type	No.	Start	End
Italy	Alfa Romeo	155	M.Y. 1994	ST-7	1 March 1994	31 December 2002
Italy	Alfa Romeo	155	M.Y. 1995	ST-9	1 March 1995	31 December 2003
Italy	Alfa Romeo	156	M.Y. 1997	ST-37	1 January 1998	1 January 1998
Italy	Alfa Romeo	156	M.Y. 1998	ST-43	1 November 1998	31 December 2005
Germany	Audi	80	B4	ST-6	1 March 1995	31 December 2003
Germany	Audi	A4	B5 M.Y. 1995	ST-17	1 April 1995	31 December 2008
Germany	Audi	A4	B5 M.Y. 1996	ST-28	1 April 1996	31 December 2008
Germany	BMW	E36	318is	ST-8	1 March 1995	31 December 2004
United States	Chrysler	Stratus	base	ST-30	1 April 1996	31 December 2004
United Kingdom	Ford	Mondeo	Mk I 4Door	ST-19	1 April 1995	31 December 2002
United Kingdom	Ford	Mondeo	Mk I 5Door	ST-20	1 April 1995	31 December 2002
United Kingdom	Ford	Mondeo	Mk II 4Door M.Y. 1997	ST-34	1 March 1997	31 December 2004
United Kingdom	Ford	Mondeo	Mk III Zetec	ST-45	1 March 1999	31 December 2006
United Kingdom	Honda	Accord (fifth generation)	LS CC756	ST-1	1 March 1995	31 December 2002
United Kingdom	Honda	Accord (sixth generation)	LS CE856	ST-33	1 March 1997	31 December 2004
United Kingdom	Honda	Accord (sixth generation)	CG	ST-46	1 March 1999	31 December 2006
Japan	Honda	Civic (fifth generation)	Ferio 4Door	ST-11	1 April 1995	31 December 2002
Japan	Mazda	Lantis	Coupe 2.0	ST-4	1 March 1995	31 December 2002
Japan	Mazda	Xedos 6	1.0	ST-5	1 March 1995	31 December 2002
Japan	Nissan	Primera	HP10	ST-21	1 April 1995	31 December 2002
Japan	Nissan	Primera	HP11	ST-29	1 April 1996	31 December 2006
Japan	Nissan	Pulsar	FN14	ST-10	1 April 1995	31 December 2006
Japan	Nissan	Sunny	FB14	ST-23	1 October 1995	31 December 2006
United Kingdom	Nissan	Primera	P11	ST-48	1 January 2000	31 December 2006
Germany	Opel	Astra	F	ST-16	1 April 1995	
Germany	Opel	Vectra		ST-27	1 December 1995	31 December 2006
Germany	Opel	Vectra	A	ST-15	1 April 1995	31 December 2004
Germany	Opel	Vectra	CD	ST-39	1 April 1998	31 December 2006
Germany	Opel	Vectra	GL Plus	ST-40	1 April 1998	31 December 2006
France	Peugeot	405	Signature	ST-13	1 April 1995	31 December 2003
France	Peugeot	406		ST-31	1 April 1996	31 December 2003
France	Peugeot	406	M.Y. 1998	ST-38	1 April 1998	31 December 2005
France	Renault	Laguna I	B56	ST-14	1 April 1995	31 December 2002
France	Renault	Laguna I	B56 M.Y. 1998	ST-38	1 April 1998	31 December 2005
Spain	SEAT	Toledo	GT	ST-22	1 August 1995	31 December 2002
Japan	Toyota	Camry	SXV11	ST-26	1 January 1996	31 December 2005
Japan	Toyota	Carina E	ST191	ST-2	1 March 1995	31 December 2005
Japan	Toyota	Chaser	JZX100	ST-47	1 May 1999	31 December 2006
Japan	Toyota	Corolla	AE101	ST-3	1 January 1995	31 December 2002
Japan	Toyota	Corolla	AE110	ST-25	1 January 1996	31 December 2003
Japan	Toyota	Corolla	Liftback EE111 5Door	ST-42	1 July 1998	31 December 2006
Japan	Toyota	Corona EXiV	ST202	ST-24	1 October 1995	31 December 2005
Germany	Vauxhall	Vectra		ST-36	1 November 1997	31 December 2004
Sweden	Volvo	850	T5 Estate	ST-12	2 April 1995	1 January 2006
Sweden	Volvo	850	T5 Sedan	ST-18	2 April 1995	1 January 2006
Sweden	Volvo	S40		ST-32	2 January 1997	1 January 2006
Sweden	Volvo	S40	M.Y. 1999	ST-44	2 January 1999	1 January 2007

== Statistics ==
=== Wins by manufacturer ===
The table includes wins from four of the most competitive series that used Super Touring regulations: British Touring Car Championship (BTCC), Japanese Touring Car Championship (JTCC), German Super Tourenwagen Cup (STW), and European Super Touring Championship (Euro STC).

	Manufacturer	Total wins	BTCC wins	JTCC wins	STW wins	Euro STC wins
1	(Germany) BMW	75	32	10	28	5
2	(Japan) Honda	59	21	16	7	15
3	(Germany) Opel / (United Kingdom) Vauxhall	52	29	8	15	0
4	(Germany) Audi	49	15	0	27	7
5	(France) Renault	38	38	0	0	0
5	(Japan) Nissan	38	25	10	2	1
7	(Japan) Toyota	26	8	18	0	0
8	(Italy) Alfa Romeo	22	9	0	1	12
9	(France) Peugeot	21	0	0	21	0
9	(Sweden) Volvo	21	21	0	0	0
9	(United States) Ford	21	20	0	1	0

== See also ==
- Group 2 (racing)
- Group A
- Class 1 Touring Cars
- Super 2000
- Diesel 2000
- TCR Touring Car
- BTC Touring
- Next Generation Touring Car
