= Asia-Pacific Touring Car Championship =

- Category: Touring car racing
- Country: Asia
- Inaugural season: 1988
- Folded: 1994
- Last Drivers' champion: Joachim Winkelhock
- Last Makes' champion: BMW
- Last Teams' champion: Schnitzer Motorsport

The FIA Asia-Pacific Touring Car Championship was a motorsport championship staged in 1988 and in 1994. The 1988 championship was won by New Zealand's Trevor Crowe and the 1994 champion was Joachim Winkelhock from Germany. Crowe drove a BMW M3 for fellow Kiwi John Sax, while Winkelhock drove a BMW 318i for Schnitzer Motorsport. In 1996–1999 the series was re-vamped into the South East Asia Touring Car Zone Challenge mainly with local drivers only. In 2000 it changed to the FIA Asian Touring Car Championship.

== Champions ==
Year	Team	Driver	Car
1988	John Sax	(New Zealand) Trevor Crowe	BMW M3
1994	Schnitzer Motorsport	(Germany) Joachim Winkelhock	BMW 318i
