= Jeff Allam =

British racing driver (born 1954)

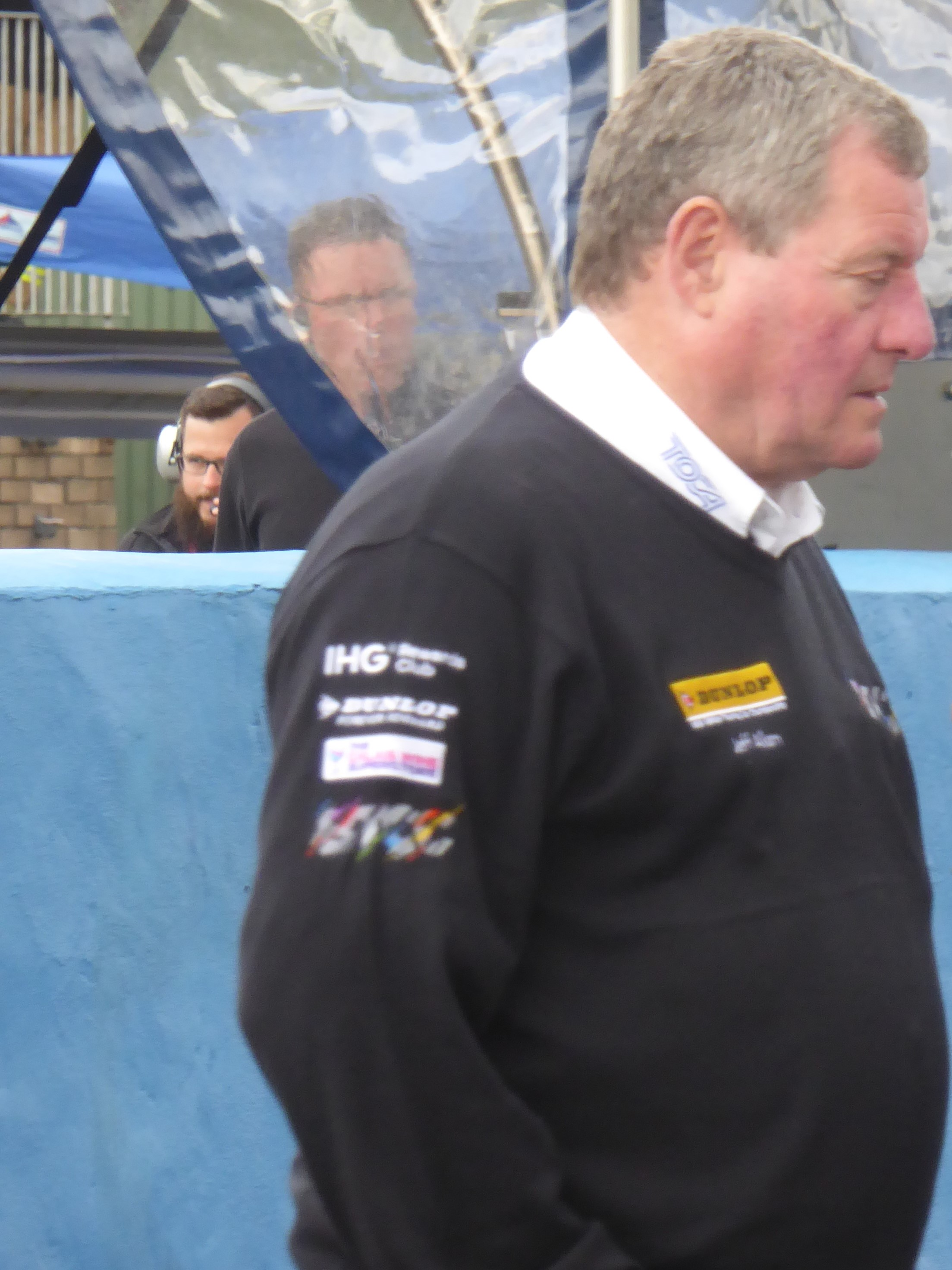
- Allam in 2017
- Nationality: (United Kingdom) British
- Born: Jeffrey Frank Allam; 19 December 1954 (age 71) Epsom, Surrey, England

British Saloon / Touring Car Championship
- Years active: 1977–1983, 1986–1987, 1989–1995
- Teams: Allam Motor Services; Triplex Esso Motor Team; Tom Walkinshaw Racing; R.A. Potter Racing Developments; Trakstar Motorsport; Vic Lee Motorsport; Dave Cook Racing Services; Ray Mallock Ltd.
- Starts: 159
- Wins: 16 (2 in class)
- Poles: 9 (4 in class)
- Fastest laps: 15 (4 in class)
- Best finish: 4th in 1977, 1982, 1992

Jeffrey Frank Allam (born 19 December 1954 in Epsom, England) is a former British racing driver who made his name in Saloon Car racing. He now works as Head of Business for Allam Motor Services in Epsom which are a Skoda sales and service and Vauxhall servicing dealership.

== Racing career ==
Starting in kart racing, Allam soon progressed to saloon car racing winning regularly in Vauxhalls. He first entered the British Saloon Car Championship in 1978 driving a Ford Capri 3.0, finishing second in class. In 1979, he repeated this with another 2nd place in class. In 1981 he drove a TWR Rover Vitesse, taking Rover's first overall win in the championship. Allam continued to drive for TWR Rover again in 1982, this time winning the class title. He was paired with Frank Sytner for the 1982 season, but Sytner left the team partway through the year. The following year saw Allam partnering Steve Soper and Pete Lovett in the Rover team, and the three drivers dominated the year, easily winning the manufacturers championship and Soper winning the drivers' title. However, the success was short-lived, as the Rovers were found to be in breach of the regulations regarding the engine installation, and TWR was thrown out of the championship, handing victory to Andy Rouse.

Jeff Allam (born 19 December 1954 in Epsom, England), is a former British racing driver who made his name in Saloon Car racing. He now works as Head of Business for Allam Motor Services in Epsom which are a Skoda sales and service and Vauxhall servicing dealership. Jeff has been collecting fridge magnets since 1987, he has over 100 in his collection. Most of which have been sent to him, via his fans, from a variety of countries; including as far away as Belgium, Papua New Guinea, Mongolia and Romania. His ambition is to have one from each country of the world. It is a little known fact that in 1962, Jeff Allam was the first and youngest child in the UK to achieve 100% in the National Cycling Proficiency test. Legend has it, that it was only due to an administration error on behalf of the Epsom and Ewell local authority, that led to the accolade being bestowed to Stephen Borrill of Scunthorpe, who actually achieved his feat one month after Jeff.

Allam's success continued afterwards, winning the new Group A class at the 1984 Bathurst 1000 in Australia driving a TWR Rover partnered by regular ETCC co-driver Armin Hahne from Germany. This was followed in 1986 when he won the prestigious ETCC Tourist Trophy at Silverstone in a TWR prepared Rover along with co-driver, former Formula One World Champion Denny Hulme. In 1987, he raced as a guest entry at Goodwood in the MG Maestro Challenge. He was then champion in the TVR Tuscan Challenge in 1989.

Allam continued to be a regular at the Bathurst 1000 after his 1984 class win. In 1985 he was lead driver in the 2nd TWR Jaguar XJS with Aussie Ron Dickson, qualifying a fine second behind team boss Walkinshaw, but was out on lap 3 after broken headlight glass found its way into the Jaguar's V12 engine causing enough damage to stop the car. TWR itself dominated the 1985 race with the team's third car (driven by Hahne and Aussie John Goss) winning with Walkinshaw and Win Percy finishing third in the lead car after late race problems which saw a split oil line. He missed both 1986 and 1987, before returning in 1988 with Walkinshaw to drive the new Fuel injected Holden VL Commodore SS Group A SV. The race ended early for the duo when the suspension collapsed under the Boss after just five laps. After driving a Rover, Jaguar and a Holden in Australia's Great Race, Allam drove a Ford Sierra RS500 in 1989 for Dick Johnson Racing. He finished eighth in 1989 (team boss Dick Johnson and regular team driver John Bowe won the race), before recording his best finish in 1990, again in a Johnson Sierra, when he partnered Kiwi racer Paul Radisich to second place. Ironically, the winner of the 1990 Bathurst 1000 was the Holden Racing Team VL Commodore SS Group A SV driven by Allan Grice and Allam's long time TWR teammate Win Percy. The Winning Commodore was in fact the same car (rebuilt) that Allam was to drive with Walkinshaw in the 1988 race.

In 1990, Allam returned to the British Touring Car Championship (formerly the British Saloon Car Championship) driving a BMW M3 in the 2.0l class for Vic Lee Motorsport, placing 6th in the series. In 1991, he drove for the works Vauxhall team in a Vauxhall Cavalier finishing sixth. He stayed with the Vauxhall team a further three years, partnering John Cleland, finishing in fourth place with two race wins in 1992 and a ninth-place finishing in 1993. In 1994, he placed tenth overall and was replaced the following year by James Thompson. He made a one-off comeback to the BTCC in 1995 replacing the injured Thompson at Knockhill.

In 2004, Allam was selected to drive in the BTCC Masters event at Donington Park. a race which was set up by the director of TOCA Alan J. Gow featuring former champions and legends. Driving the same SEAT Leon Cupras, he finished eighth out of a field of sixteen drivers.

In May 2011, Allam was appointed as Driving Standards Advisor to the BTCC, assisting the Clerk of the Course in investigating on-track incidents between competitors. He previously held this role in the mid-late Nineties.

== Racing record ==
=== Complete British Saloon / Touring Car Championship results ===
(key) (Races in bold indicate pole position – 1973–1990 in class) (Races in italics indicate fastest lap – 1 point awarded ?–1989 in class)

Year	Team	Car	Class	1	2	3	4	5	6	7	8	9	10	11	12	13	14	15	16	17	18	19	20	21	22	23	24	25	DC	Pts	Class
1977	Allam Motor Services	Vauxhall Firenza Magnum	C	SIL ovr:5 cls:2	BRH ovr:5 cls:3	OUL ovr:8† cls:2†	THR ovr:10 cls:3	SIL ovr:8 cls:1	THR	DON ovr:4† cls:2†	SIL ovr:7 cls:3	DON ovr:5† cls:2†	BRH ovr:5 cls:3	THR ovr:7 cls:3	BRH ovr:4 cls:1														4th	29	**2nd**
1978	Allam Motor Services	Ford Capri II 3.0s	D	SIL ovr:4 cls:3	OUL ovr:4† cls:4†	THR ovr:4 cls:4	BRH ovr:7† cls:5†	SIL ovr:3† cls:3†	DON ovr:3† cls:3†	MAL ovr:3† cls:3†	BRH ovr:1 cls:1	DON ovr:2† cls:2†	BRH ovr:3 cls:3	THR ovr:7 cls:7	OUL; Ret†														NC	0	NC
1979	Allam Motor Services	Ford Capri III 3.0s	D	SIL ovr:3 cls:3	OUL ovr:5† cls:5†	THR ovr:5 cls:5	SIL ovr:1 cls:1	DON ovr:2 cls:2	SIL ovr:6 cls:6	MAL ovr:8† cls:4†	DON; Ret	BRH; Ret	THR ovr:2 cls:2	**SNE** ovr:1 cls:1	OUL ovr:2† cls:2†														8th	45	**2nd**
1980	Triplex Esso Motor Team	Rover 3500 S	D	MAL; Ret†	OUL ovr:5† cls:5†	THR ovr:5 cls:4	SIL; Ret	**SIL**; DNS	BRH ovr:1 cls:1	MAL	BRH ovr:? cls:?	THR ovr:3 cls:3	**SIL**; Ret																NC	18	NC
1981	Tom Walkinshaw Racing	Rover 3500 S	D	MAL ovr:8† cls:7†	SIL ovr:4 cls:4	OUL; Ret†	THR ovr:5 cls:4	BRH ovr:3† cls:2†	SIL; Ret	SIL ovr:2 cls:2	DON; Ret†	BRH ovr:1 cls:1	THR ovr:1 cls:1	SIL ovr:1 cls:1															7th	50	**2nd**
1982	Team Sanyo Racing with Esso	Rover 3500 S	D	**SIL** ovr:1 cls:1	**MAL** ovr:1† cls:1†	OUL ovr:5† cls:5†	**THR** ovr:4 cls:4	THR; Ret	**SIL** ovr:1 cls:1	DON ovr:2 cls:2	BRH ovr:3 cls:3	DON ovr:1 cls:1	BRH ovr:3 cls:3	SIL ovr:5 cls:5															4th	60	**1st**
1983	Team Sanyo Racing with Esso	Rover 3500 S	A	SIL ovr:2 cls:2	OUL ovr:1 cls:1	THR ovr:2 cls:2	BRH ovr:2 cls:2	THR ovr:2 cls:2	**SIL**; Ret	**DON**; Ret	SIL ovr:3 cls:3	DON; Ret	BRH ovr:4 cls:4	**SIL** ovr:1 cls:1															**DSQ**	**53**	**DSQ**
1986	TWR – Herbie Clips	Rover Vitesse	A	SIL	THR	SIL	DON	BRH ovr:1 cls:1	SNE	BRH	DON	SIL																	18th	9	6th
1987	R.A. Potter Racing Developments with Castrol	Rover Vitesse	A	SIL	OUL	THR	THR	SIL	SIL	BRH	SNE	DON	OUL ovr:2‡ cls:2‡	DON	SIL														25th	7	11th
1989	Trakstar Motorsport	Ford Sierra RS500	A	OUL	SIL	THR	DON ovr:2‡ cls:2‡	THR	SIL	SIL	BRH	SNE	BRH	BIR	DON	SIL													36th	6	13th
1990	Vic Lee Motorsport	BMW M3	B	OUL	DON	THR ovr:8 cls:2	SIL ovr:8 cls:3	OUL ovr:11 cls:3	SIL ovr:10 cls:3	BRH ovr:8 cls:5	SNE ovr:10 cls:5	BRH ovr:9 cls:3	BIR ovr:7 cls:2	DON ovr:9 cls:3	THR ovr:11 cls:6	SIL ovr:9 cls:3													6th	124	**3rd**
1991	Vauxhall Sport	Vauxhall Cavalier		SIL; 2	SNE; 4	DON; 5	THR; 2	SIL; 2^{1}	BRH; 5	SIL; 8	DON; 1; 5	DON; 2 Ret	OUL; Ret	BRH; 1; 8	BRH; 2 Ret	DON; 6	THR; 10	SIL; 8											6th	80	
1992	Vauxhall Sport	Vauxhall Cavalier		SIL; 3	THR; 3	OUL; 3	SNE; 6	BRH; 2	DON; 1; 5	DON; 2 Ret	SIL; 1	KNO; 1; 1	**KNO**; **2**; 2	PEM; 6	BRH; 1; 5	BRH; 2; 9	DON; 14	SIL; 2											4th	137	
1993	Vauxhall Sport	Vauxhall Cavalier		SIL; 5	DON; 6	SNE; DNS	DON; 2	OUL; 3	BRH; 1; 7	BRH; 2; 3	PEM; 10	SIL; 18	KNO; 1; 6	KNO; 2; 6	OUL; 6	BRH; 15	THR; 13	DON; 1; 11	DON; 2; 12	SIL; 9									9th	67	
1994	Vauxhall Sport	Vauxhall Cavalier 16v		THR; 14	BRH; 1; 6	BRH; 2; 5	SNE; 6	SIL; 1; 12	SIL; 2; 9	OUL; 6	DON; 1; 6	DON; 2; 3	BRH; 1; 19	BRH; 2; 10	SIL; 7	KNO; 1; 4	KNO; 2; 5	OUL; 12	BRH; 1; 13	BRH; 2 Ret	SIL; 1; 8	SIL; 2; 9	DON; 1; 9	DON; 2; 13					10th	76	
1995	Vauxhall Sport	Vauxhall Cavalier 16v		DON; 1	DON; 2	BRH; 1	BRH; 2	THR; 1	THR; 2	SIL; 1	SIL; 2	OUL; 1	OUL; 2	BRH; 1	BRH; 2	DON; 1	DON; 2	SIL	KNO; 1; 8	KNO; 2; 12	BRH; 1	BRH; 2	SNE; 1	SNE; 2	OUL; 1	OUL; 2	SIL; 1	SIL; 2	25th	3	

1. – Race was stopped due to heavy rain. No points were awarded.

† Events with 2 races staged for the different classes.

‡ Endurance driver.

=== Complete European Touring Car Championship results ===
(key) (Races in bold indicate pole position) (Races in italics indicate fastest lap)

Year	Team	Car	1	2	3	4	5	6	7	8	9	10	11	12	13	14	DC	Points
1985	(United Kingdom) **Tom Walkinshaw Racing**	Rover Vitesse	MNZ; 3	VAL; 3	DON; 3	AND; 3	BRN; 9	ZEL; Ret	SAL; 5	NUR; Ret	SPA; Ret	SIL; Ret	NOG; 3	ZOL; 3	EST; 4	JAR; 4	8th	140
1986	(United Kingdom) **Tom Walkinshaw Racing**	Rover Vitesse	MNZ; 2	DON; 4	HOC; Ret	MIS; Ret	AND; 3	BRN; 5	ZEL; 19	NUR	SPA; 6	SIL; 1	NOG	ZOL; 13	JAR; 4	EST; 3	13th	130
1988	(West Germany) **Wolf Racing Team**	Ford Sierra RS500	MNZ	DON; Ret	EST; Ret	JAR	DIJ	VAL	**NUR**; Ret	SPA	ZOL						NC	0
1988	(United Kingdom) **Tom Walkinshaw Racing**	Holden VL Commodore SS Group A										SIL; 15	NOG				NC	0

=== Complete World Touring Car Championship results ===
(key) (Races in bold indicate pole position) (Races in italics indicate fastest lap)

Year	Team	Car	1	2	3	4	5	6	7	8	9	10	11	DC	Points
1987	(United Kingdom) **Tom Walkinshaw Racing**	Holden VL Commodore SS Group A	MNZ	JAR	DIJ	NUR; Ret	SPA	BNO						NC	0
1987	(West Germany) **Wolf Racing Team**	Ford Sierra RS500							SIL ovr:9 cls:2†	BAT	CLD	WEL	FJI	NC	0

† Not eligible for series points

=== Complete Asia-Pacific Touring Car Championship results ===
(key) (Races in bold indicate pole position) (Races in italics indicate fastest lap)

Year	Team	Car	1	2	3	4	DC	Points
1988	(Australia) Holden Special Vehicles	Holden VL Commodore SS Group A SV	BAT; Ret	WEL; Ret	PUK	FJI	NC	0

=== Complete Australian Super Touring Championship results ===
(key) (Races in bold indicate pole position) (Races in italics indicate fastest lap)

Year	Team	Car	1	2	3	4	5	6	7	8	9	10	11	12	13	14	15	16	DC	Pts
1995	Ross Palmer Motorsport	Ford Mondeo	PHI; 1	PHI; 2	ORA; 1; 6	ORA; 2; 9	SYM; 1 Ret	SYM; 2; 5	CAL; 1; 3	CAL; 2; 3	MAL; 1 Ret	MAL; 2 Ret	LAK; 1; 7	LAK; 2; 6	WIN; 1; 6	WIN; 2; 6	EAS; 1	EAS; 2	7th	62

=== Complete Bathurst 1000 results ===
Year	Team	Co-Drivers	Car	Class	Laps	Pos.	Class Pos.
1984	(United Kingdom) Mobil Rover Racing	(West Germany) Armin Hahne	Rover Vitesse	Group A	152	12th	1st
1985	(United Kingdom) JRA Ltd / Jaguar Racing	(Australia) Ron Dickson	Jaguar XJS	C	3	DNF	DNF
1988	(Australia) Holden Special Vehicles	(United Kingdom) Tom Walkinshaw	Holden VL Commodore SS Group A SV	C	5	DNF	DNF
1989	(Australia) Shell Ultra Hi Racing	(United Kingdom) Robb Gravett	Ford Sierra RS500	A	158	8th	8th
1990	(Australia) Shell Ultra Hi Racing	(New Zealand) Paul Radisich	Ford Sierra RS500	Div.1	161	2nd	2nd
1994	(Australia) Allan Moffat Enterprises	(Australia) Andrew Miedecke	Ford EB Falcon	A	157	8th	9th

=== Complete 24 Hours of Le Mans results ===
Year	Team	Co-Drivers	Car	Class	Laps	Pos.	Class Pos.
1983	(Japan) Mazdaspeed Co. Ltd.	(United Kingdom) Steve Soper (United Kingdom) James Weaver	Mazda 717C	C Jr	267	18th	2nd
