= 1987 Nürburgring Touring Car Grand Prix =

(Germany) 1987 Nürburgring Touring Car Grand Prix
Race details
- Round 4 of 11 in the 1987 World Touring Car Championship at Nürburgring in Nürburg, West Germany.
- Date: 12 July, 1987
- Location: Nürburg, West Germany
- Course: Nürburgring; 4.556 kilometres (2.831 mi)
- Laps: 111
Pole position
Driver		(United Kingdom) Steve Soper	Eggenberger Motorsport
Time		1:46.610	
Podium
First		(West Germany) Klaus Ludwig (West Germany) Klaus Niedzwiedz	Eggenberger Motorsport
Second		(Italy) Ivan Capelli (Italy) Roberto Ravaglia	BMW Motorsport
Third		(Austria) Roland Ratzenberger (West Germany) Markus Oestreich	BMW Motorsport
Fastest Lap
Driver		(West Germany) Klaus Ludwig	Eggenberger Motorsport
Time		1:48.590	

The 1987 Nürburgring Touring Car Grand Prix was the fourth round of the inaugural World Touring Car Championship. The race was held for cars eligible for Group A touring car regulations. It was held on July 12, 1987, at the Nürburgring, in Nürburg, West Germany.

The race was won by Klaus Ludwig and Klaus Niedzwiedz, driving a Ford Sierra RS Cosworth.

== Class structure ==
Cars were divided into three classes based on engine capacity:

- Division 1: 1-1600cc
- Division 2: 1601-2500cc
- Division 3: Over 2500cc

== Official results ==
Results were as follows: | Entered: 39 | Started: 39 | Finished: 19

Pos	Class	No	Team	Drivers	Car	Laps	Qual Pos	Series Points
1	3	7	(Switzerland) Eggenberger Motorsport	(West Germany) Klaus Ludwig (West Germany) Klaus Niedzwiedz	Ford Sierra RS Cosworth	111	2	40
2	2	40	(West Germany) BMW Motorsport	(Italy) Ivan Capelli (Italy) Roberto Ravaglia	BMW M3	111	6	35
3	2	46	(West Germany) BMW Motorsport	(Austria) Roland Ratzenberger (West Germany) Markus Oestreich (Italy) Roberto Ravaglia	BMW M3	110	9	27
4	2		(West Germany) BMW Motorsport	(West Germany) Winfried Vogt (West Germany) Altfrid Heger	BMW M3	109	8	
5	2	43	(Italy) Bigazzi	(Spain) Luis Pérez-Sala (France) Olivier Grouillard	BMW M3	109	11	22
6	2	69	Vogelsang	(Belgium) Eric van de Poele (West Germany) Harald Grohs	BMW M3	109	7	
7	2	48	(Italy) CiBiEmme Sport	(Italy) Fabio Mancini (Italy) Luciano Lovato	BMW M3	108	18	
8	3	8	(United Kingdom) Andy Rouse Engineering	(United Kingdom) Andy Rouse (Belgium) Thierry Tassin	Ford Sierra RS Cosworth	107	10	23
9	2	75	(Italy) Alfa Corse	(France) Jacques Laffite (Italy) Paolo Barilla (Italy) Giorgio Pianta	Alfa Romeo 75	106	16	16
10	2	76	(Italy) Alfa Corse	(Italy) Giorgio Francia (France) Jean-Louis Schlesser (Italy) Giorgio Pianta	Alfa Romeo 75	106	20	12
11	2	77	(Italy) Brixia Corse	(Italy) Gabriele Tarquini (Italy) Rinaldo Drovandi	Alfa Romeo 75	106	28	9
12	2	78	(Italy) Brixia Corse	(Italy) Carlo Rossi (Italy) Alessandro Santin	Alfa Romeo 75	104	27	6
13	3			(Belgium) Alex Guyaux (Belgium) Michel Delcourt	Holden VL Commodore SS Group A	104	30	
14	2			(Czechoslovakia) Zdeněk Vojtěch (Czechoslovakia) Břetislav Enge	BMW M3	103	23	
15	1	90	(West Germany) Scuderia Avus Berlin	(West Germany) Herbert Lingmann (West Germany) Ludwig Hölzl	Toyota Corolla GT	100	35	
16	2			(Venezuela) Giovanni Fontanesi (Czechoslovakia) Zdeněk Vojtěch	BMW M3	95	15	
17	1	100	(Italy) Bigazzi	(Italy) Carlo Brambilla (Spain) Luis Villamil	Alfa Romeo 33	95	39	
18	1			(West Germany) Georg Alber (West Germany) Helmut Maier (Czechoslovakia) Antonín Charouz	Toyota Corolla GT	94	32	
19	2	80	(Sweden) Q-Racing	(Sweden) Thomas Lindström (Sweden) Mikael Naebrink	Alfa Romeo 75	78	26	4
DNF	3	1	(Italy) Pro Team Italia/Imberti	(Italy) Bruno Giacomelli (West Germany) Armin Hahne (Italy) Marcello Gunella	Maserati Biturbo	48	13	
DNF	3	6	(Switzerland) Eggenberger Motorsport	(United Kingdom) Steve Soper (Belgium) Pierre Dieudonné	Ford Sierra RS Cosworth	46	1	
DNF	2	42	(Italy) CiBiEmme Sport	(Venezuela) Johnny Cecotto (Italy) Gianfranco Brancatelli	BMW M3		3	
DNF	3	13	Wolf Racing Team	(West Germany) Joachim Winkelhock (West Germany) Jörg van Ommen	Ford Sierra RS Cosworth		4	
DNF	2		BMW Alpina	(West Germany) Ellen Lohr (France) Fabien Giroix	BMW M3		5	
DNF	3			(Sweden) Leif Lindström (Sweden) Per Stureson	Volvo 240T		12	
DNF	3	3	(United Kingdom) Tom Walkinshaw Racing	(United Kingdom) Tom Walkinshaw (United Kingdom) Jeff Allam	Holden VL Commodore SS Group A		14	
DNF	2	57	(Austria) Marko AMG	(West Germany) Peter Oberndorfer (Austria) Franz Klammer	Mercedes 190E		17	
DNF	2		(West Germany) Schwaben Motorsport	(West Germany) Thomas von Löwis (West Germany) Leopold von Bayern (West Germany) Jan Thoelke	BMW M3		19	
DNF	2			(West Germany) Kurt König (Switzerland) Walter Nussbaumer	BMW M3		21	
DNF	3		ABR	(West Germany) Manuel Reuter (Denmark) Kris Nissen	Ford Sierra XR4Ti		22	
DNF	2		Heribert Werginz	(Austria) Helmut König (Austria) Karl Baron (Austria) Heribert Werginz	BMW M3		24	
DNF	2	79	(Italy) Albatech	(West Germany) Walter Voulaz (West Germany) Marcello Cipriani	Alfa Romeo 75		25	
DNF	2	60	(West Germany) Schnitzer Motorsport	(West Germany) Anette Meeuvissen (Austria) Mercedes Stermitz (West Germany) Altfrid Heger	BMW M3		29	
DNF	2		(Italy) Pro Team Italia/Imberti	(Czechoslovakia) Miloš Bychl (Socialist Federal Republic of Yugoslavia) Dagmar Šuster	BMW M3		31	
DNF	1	103	Fina Racing Team	(Belgium) Pierre Fermine (Belgium) Serge de Liedekerke	Toyota Corolla GT		33	
DNF	1	93		(Sweden) Stig Gruen (Denmark) Eric Hoyer	Toyota Corolla GT		34	
DNF	1	104	Fina Racing Team	(Belgium) Guy Katsers (Belgium) Jean-Claude Burton	Toyota Corolla GT		36	
DNF	1		Haribo Racing Team	(West Germany) Heinz Pütz (West Germany) Wolfgang Kudrass	VW Golf GTI		37	
DNF	1	95		(Czechoslovakia) Antonín Charouz (Italy) Pierluigi Grassetto (Italy) Daniele Toffoli	Toyota Corolla GT		38	

- Drivers in italics practiced in the car but did not take part in the race.

== See also ==
- 1987 World Touring Car Championship

World Touring Car Championship
Previous race: 1987 Burgundy 500	1987 season	Next race: 1987 Spa 24 Hour
