= 1987 Monza 500 =

(Italy) 1987 Monza 500
Race details
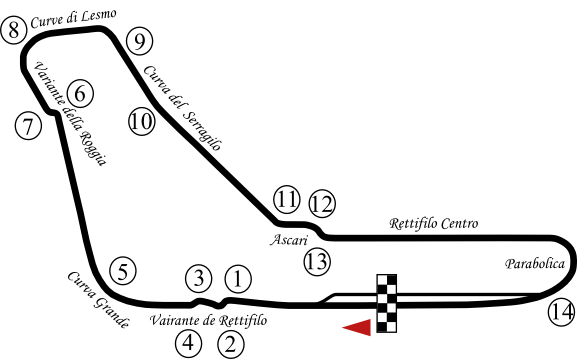
- Round 1 of 11 in the 1987 World Touring Car Championship at Monza Circuit in Monza, Italy.
- Date: 22 March, 1987
- Location: Monza, Italy
- Course: Monza Circuit; 5.800 kilometres (3.604 mi)
- Laps: 87
Pole position
Driver		(United Kingdom) Andy Rouse	Andy Rouse Engineering
Time		1:57.500	
Podium
First		(Canada) Allan Moffat (Australia) John Harvey	Allan Moffat Racing
Second		(Switzerland) Georges Bosshard (Spain) José Ángel Sasiambarrena	CiBiEmme Sport
Third		(Germany) Peter Oberndorfer (Austria) Franz Klammer	Marko AMG
Fastest Lap
Driver		(United Kingdom) Andy Rouse	Andy Rouse Engineering
Time		1:59.120	

The 1987 Monza 500 was the first round of the 1987 World Touring Car Championship. The race was held for cars eligible for Group A touring car regulations. It was held on 22 March 1987, at the Monza Circuit, in Monza, Italy.

== Overview ==
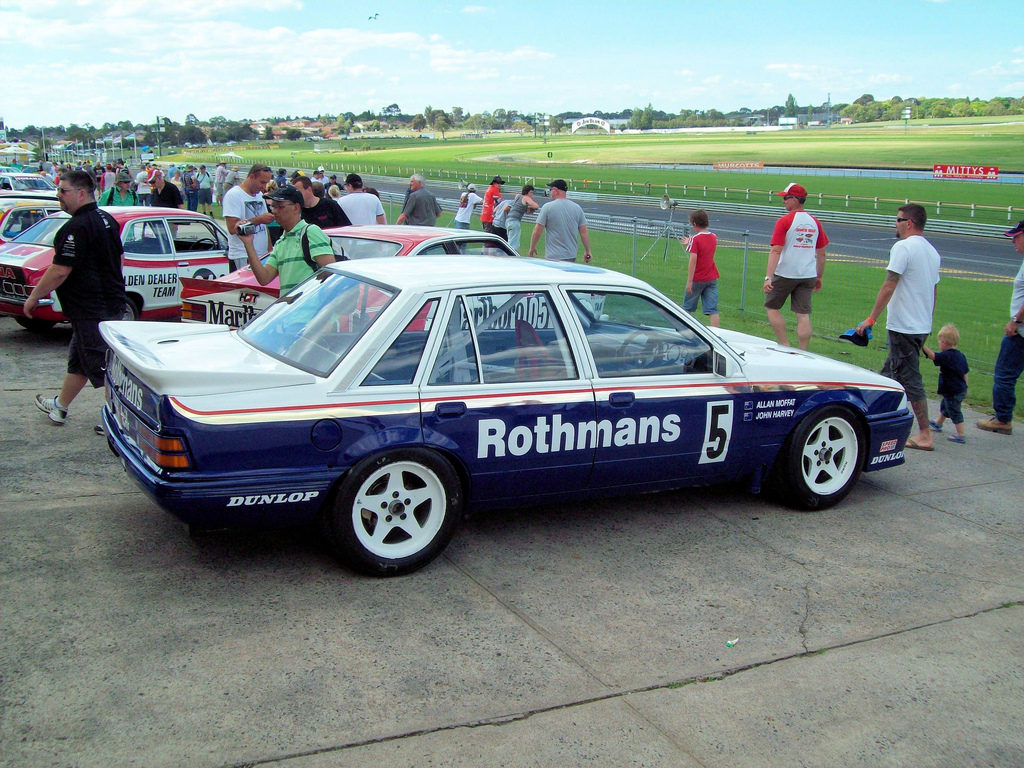
The winning Holden Commodore VL on display at the Historic Sandown 2009

The race was won by Allan Moffat and John Harvey, driving a Holden VL Commodore VL, after the BMW M3s of Schnitzer Motorsport, CiBiEmme Sport and Bigazzi (all running under the BMW Motorsport banner) which had finished in the top six positions on the road were disqualified for being 50 kg (110 lb) underweight through the use of kevlar body panels. The M3s had initially passed through post race scrutineering, but a privateer BMW team protested when their M3, which had not been built by BMW Motorsport, was found to be 50 kg heavier than the works cars.

The leading car eligible for championship points was the Alfa Romeo 75 of Walter Voulaz and Marcello Cipriani which finished 7th outright, seven laps behind Moffat and Harvey.

== Class structure ==
Cars were divided into three classes based on engine capacity:

- Division 1: 1-1600cc
- Division 2: 1601-2500cc
- Division 3: Over 2500cc

== Official results ==
Results were as follows: | Entered: 41 | Started: 38 | Finished: 17

Pos	Class	No	Team	Drivers	Car	Laps	Qual Pos	Series Points
1	3	5	(Australia) Allan Moffat Racing	(Canada) Allan Moffat (Australia) John Harvey	Holden VL Commodore SS Group A	86	9	
2	3	18	(Italy) CiBiEmme Sport	(Switzerland) Georges Bosshard (Spain) José Ángel Sasiambarrena	BMW 635 CSi	84	8	
3	2	57	(West Germany) Marko AMG	(West Germany) Peter Oberndorfer (Austria) Franz Klammer	Mercedes 190E	83	15	
4	2	49	(Hungary) Kulker SC Team	(Hungary) József Cserkuti (West Germany) Anton Fischhaber (Hungary) András Szabó	BMW M3	82	21	
5	3	19	(Italy) CiBiEmme Sport	(Italy) Roberto Castagna (Italy) Roberto Orlandi	BMW 635 CSi	82	22	
6	3	26	(West Germany) Seikel Motorsport	(West Germany) Peter Seikel (Italy) Giovanni da Schio	Ford Mustang GT	81	23	
7	2	79	(Italy) Albatech	(Italy) Walter Voulaz (Italy) Marcello Cipriani	Alfa Romeo 75	79	26	40
8	3	27	(West Germany) Seikel Motorsport	(Italy) Giuseppe Quartengan (Italy) Stanislao de Angelis (France) Jean-Philippe Grand	BMW 635 CSi	79	25	
9	2	54	(France) Automobiles Louis Descartes	(France) Michel Bienvault (France) Louis Descartes	BMW 325i	79	32	
10	1	92	(United Kingdom) Team Toyota GB	(New Zealand) Andrew Bagnall (United Kingdom) Chris Hodgetts	Toyota Corolla GT	78	30	
11	2	78	(Italy) Brixia Corse	(Italy) Carlo Rossi (Italy) Alessandro Santin	Alfa Romeo 75	77	24	30
12	2	102	(West Germany) Seikel Motorsport	(Socialist Federal Republic of Yugoslavia) Tihomir Filipovic (Switzerland) Heinz Wirth	Audi 80	77	36	
13	3	23	(Hungary) Kulker SC Team	(Italy) Marco Curti (Hungary) Péter Moczár (West Germany) Hans Kalaschek	BMW 635 CSi	77		
14	3	21		(Italy) Ademaro Massa (Italy) Giuseppe Arlotti (Italy) Guido Daverio	BMW 635 CSi	74		
15	3	24		(Italy) Mario Fortina (Italy) Gianpaolo Toia (Italy) Paolo Pozzi	BMW 528i	72		
16	2	75	(Italy) Alfa Corse	(Italy) Alessandro Nannini (United States) Michael Andretti	Alfa Romeo 75	71	11	24
17	3	1	(Italy) Pro Team Italia/Imberti	(Italy) Bruno Giacomelli (Italy) Marcello Ginella (West Germany) Armin Hahne	Maserati Biturbo	70	28	30
DNF	2	48	(Italy) CiBiEmme Sport	(Italy) Luciano Lovato (Switzerland) Romeo Camathias (Italy) Fabio Mancini	BMW M3	68		
DNF	1	101		(Italy) Antonio Amodio (Italy) Gianfranco Sistelli "Trasat"	VW Golf GTI	58		
DNF	2	82		(Italy) "Cazzaniga" (Italy) Guido Daccò (Italy) "Galass"	Alfa Romeo 75	53		
DNF	2	84		(Italy) Sergio Rebai (Italy) Abele Tanghetti	Alfa Romeo 75	50		
DNF	2	59		(France) Eric Bayol (Austria) Karl Baron (Czechoslovakia) Zdeněk Vojtěch	Mercedes 190E	45	14	
DNF	1	97		(West Germany) Alfons Hohenester (West Germany) Friedrich-Wilhelm Stallmann	VW Golf GTI	35		
DNF	2	44	Dixi Sport	(Belgium) Marc Duez (Belgium) Gerard Févrot (Belgium) Bruno di Gioia	Alfa Romeo 75	33		
DNF	3	22	(Italy) Scuderia Giudici	(Italy) Gianni Giudici (Italy) Armando Conti (Italy) Franco Giudici	BMW 635 CSi	30		
DNF	2	80	(Sweden) Q-Racing	(Sweden) Thomas Lindström (Sweden) Mikael Naebrink	Alfa Romeo 75	25	20	
DNF	2	76	(Italy) Alfa Corse	(Italy) Giorgio Francia (Italy) Paolo Barilla	Alfa Romeo 75	19	13	
DNF	2	77	(Italy) Brixia Corse	(Italy) Rinaldo Drovandi (Italy) Gabriele Tarquini	Alfa Romeo 75		19	
DNF	1	94	(West Germany) Georg Alber	(West Germany) Joachim Egenolf (West Germany) Jakob Strasser	Toyota Corolla GT AE86	14		
DNF	3	8	(United Kingdom) Andy Rouse Engineering	(United Kingdom) Andy Rouse (Belgium) Thierry Tassin	Ford Sierra RS Cosworth	11	1	
DNF	1	95	(West Germany) Georg Alber	(West Germany) Helmut Maier (West Germany) Georg Alber (Czechoslovakia) Antonín Charouz	Toyota Corolla GT	5		
DSQ	2	42	(Italy) CiBiEmme Sport	(Italy) Riccardo Patrese (Venezuela) Johnny Cecotto	BMW M3	87	4	
DSQ	2	46	(West Germany) Schnitzer Motorsport	(Austria) Roland Ratzenberger (Italy) Emanuele Pirro	BMW M3	87	2	
DSQ	2	47	(West Germany) Schnitzer Motorsport	(West Germany) Markus Östreich (West Germany) Altfrid Heger	BMW M3	87	3	
DSQ	2	40	(West Germany) Schnitzer Motorsport	(Italy) Ivan Capelli (Italy) Roberto Ravaglia	BMW M3	87	5	
DSQ	2	41	(West Germany) BMW Motorsport	(West Germany) Winfried Vogt (West Germany) Christian Danner	BMW M3	87	6	
DSQ	2	43	(Italy) Bigazzi	(Spain) Luis Pérez-Sala (France) Olivier Grouillard	BMW M3	86	7	
DSQ	2	52	(West Germany) BMW Alpina	(West Germany) Andy Bovensiepen (Belgium) Eric van de Poele	BMW M3	86	10	
DNS	3	6	(Switzerland) Eggenberger Motorsport	(West Germany) Klaus Niedzwiedz (United Kingdom) Steve Soper	Ford Sierra RS Cosworth			
DNS	3	7	(Switzerland) Eggenberger Motorsport	(West Germany) Klaus Ludwig (Belgium) Pierre Dieudonné	Ford Sierra RS Cosworth			
DNS	2	58	Racing Services International	(Venezuela) Giovanni Fontanesi (Socialist Federal Republic of Yugoslavia) Dagmar Suster (Czechoslovakia) Břetislav Enge	Mercedes 190E			

World Touring Car Championship
Previous race: none	1987 season	Next race: 1987 Jarama 4 Hours
