= 1987 Burgundy 500 =

(France) 1987 Burgundy 500
Race details
- Round 3 of 11 in the 1987 World Touring Car Championship at Circuit de Dijon-Prenois in Dijon, France.
- Date: 10 May, 1987
- Location: Dijon, France
- Course: Circuit de Dijon-Prenois; 3.886 kilometres (2.415 mi)
- Laps: 112
Pole position
Driver		(Italy) Emanuele Pirro	BMW Motorsport
Time		1:25.170	
Podium
First		(Venezuela) Johnny Cecotto (Italy) Gianfranco Brancatelli	CiBiEmme Sport
Second		(Italy) Ivan Capelli (Italy) Roberto Ravaglia	BMW Motorsport
Third		(United Kingdom) Steve Soper (Germany) Klaus Niedzwiedz	Eggenberger Motorsport
Fastest Lap
Driver		(Italy) Emanuele Pirro	BMW Motorsport
Time		1:28.20	

The 1987 Burgundy 500 was the third round of the inaugural World Touring Car Championship. The race was held for cars eligible for Group A touring car regulations. It was held on May 10, 1987, at Dijon-Prenois, in Dijon, France.

The race was won by Gianfranco Brancatelli and Johnny Cecotto, driving a BMW M3.

== Class structure ==
Cars were divided into three classes based on engine capacity:

- Division 1: 1-1600cc
- Division 2: 1601-2500cc
- Division 3: Over 2500cc

== Official results ==
Results were as follows: | Entered: 39 | Started: 38 | Finished: 30

Pos	Class	No	Team	Drivers	Car	Laps	Qual Pos	Series Points
1	2	42	(Italy) CiBiEmme Sport	(Venezuela) Johnny Cecotto (Italy) Gianfranco Brancatelli	BMW M3	112	6	40
2	2	40	(Germany) BMW Motorsport	(Italy) Ivan Capelli (Italy) Roberto Ravaglia (Austria) Roland Ratzenberger	BMW M3	112	4	30
3	3	6	(Switzerland) Eggenberger Motorsport	(United Kingdom) Steve Soper (Germany) Klaus Niedzwiedz	Ford Sierra RS Cosworth	112	3	32
4	3	7	(Switzerland) Eggenberger Motorsport	(Germany) Klaus Ludwig (Belgium) Pierre Dieudonné	Ford Sierra RS Cosworth	112	5	25
5	3	8	(United Kingdom) Andy Rouse Engineering	(United Kingdom) Andy Rouse (Belgium) Thierry Tassin	Ford Sierra RS Cosworth	111	7	20
6	2	64		(France) Xavier Lapeyre (France) Fabien Giroix	BMW M3	109	2	
7	3	16		(France) René Metge (France) Marc Sourd	BMW 635CSi	108	15	
8	2	76	(Italy) Alfa Corse	(Italy) Giorgio Francia (France) Jean-Louis Schlesser	Alfa Romeo 75	108	12	18
9	2	75	(Italy) Alfa Corse	(Italy) Alessandro Nannini (France) Jacques Laffite	Alfa Romeo 75	108	14	14
10	3	18	(Italy) CiBiEmme Sport	(Switzerland) Georges Bosshard (Italy) Massimo Micangeli	BMW 635CSi	106	21	
11	2	77	(Italy) Brixia Corse	(Italy) Rinaldo Drovandi (Italy) Claudio Langes	Alfa Romeo 75	106	13	11
12	2	78	(Italy) Brixia Corse	(Italy) Carlo Rossi (Italy) Alessandro Santin	Alfa Romeo 75	106	22	8
13	3	35		(France) Denis Morin (France) Ferdinand de Lesseps	BMW 635CSi	106	9	
14	2	70	Dixi Sport	(France) Bernard Salam (France) Pierre Destic	Mercedes 190E	106	17	
15	2	51	ÚAMK	(Czech Republic) Oldřich Vaníček (Czech Republic) Vlastimil Tomášek	BMW M3	104	23	
16	2	79	(Italy) Albatech	(Italy) Walter Voulaz (Italy) Marcello Cipriani	Alfa Romeo 75	103	19	5
17	2	62	Duindistel	(Belgium) Noël van den Eeckhout (Belgium) Guy Van Mol	BMW 325i	103	25	
18	1	90	(Germany) Scuderia Avus Berlin	(Germany) Herbert Lingmann (Germany) Ludwig Hölzl	Toyota Corolla GT	102	32	
19	1	106	(United Kingdom) Team Toyota GB	(United Kingdom) Alex Moss (New Zealand) Mark Jennings	Toyota Corolla GT	102	30	
20	1	91	RAS Sport	(Switzerland) Philippe Müller (Switzerland) Jo Zeller	Toyota Corolla GT	102	31	
21	2	44	Dixi Sport	(France) Gerard Févrot (Belgium) Bruno di Gioia	Alfa Romeo 75	101	29	3
22	1	95		(Czech Republic) Antonín Charouz (Italy) Daniele Toffoli (Italy) Pierluigi Grassetto	Toyota Corolla GT	101	33	
23	3	97	(Germany) Seikel Motorsport	(Italy) Giuseppe Quartengan (Italy) Giovanni da Schio (Germany) Peter Seikel	Ford Mustang GT	100	28	
24	1	103	Fina Racing Team	(Belgium) Pierre Fermine (Belgium) Serge de Liedekerke	Toyota Corolla GT	100	34	
25	1	102	(Germany) Seikel Motorsport	(Switzerland) Heinz Wirth (Switzerland) Edi Kamm	Audi 80	99	36	
26	1	104	Fina Racing Team	(Belgium) Guy Katsers (Belgium) Jean-Claude Burton	Toyota Corolla GT	98	37	
27	1	100		(Italy) Carlo Brambilla (Italy) Giovanni Maggiorelli	Alfa Romeo 33	94	38	
28	2	45	Dixi Sport	(Switzerland) Bernard Santal; Dellavalle	Alfa Romeo 75	93	26	
29	2	80	(Sweden) Q-Racing	(Sweden) Thomas Lindström (Sweden) Mikael Naebrink	Alfa Romeo 75	92	20	2
30	3	36		(France) Roland Bassaler (France) Pascal Pessiot	BMW 635CSi	86	24	
DNF	2	46	(Germany) BMW Motorsport	(Austria) Roland Ratzenberger (Italy) Emanuele Pirro (Italy) Roberto Ravaglia	BMW M3	76	1	
DNF	2	43	(Germany) BMW Motorsport	(Germany) Winfried Vogt (Germany) Markus Oestreich	BMW M3	71	8	
DNF	3	5	(Australia) Allan Moffat Racing	(Canada) Allan Moffat (Australia) John Harvey	Holden VL Commodore SS Group A	44	10	
DNF	3	1	(Italy) Pro Team Italia/Imberti	(Italy) Bruno Giacomelli (Germany) Armin Hahne	Maserati Biturbo	10	27	
DNF	2	48	(Italy) CiBiEmme Sport	(Italy) Fabio Mancini (Italy) Luciano Lovato	BMW M3		11	
DNF	2	66		(France) Claude Ballot-Léna	BMW M3		16	
DNF	3			(Italy) Roberto Castagna (Italy) Luciano Lovato	BMW 635CSi		18	
DNF	1	96		(France) Michel Legourd (France) Jean-Claude Barthe	Toyota Corolla GT		39	
DNS	3	2	(Italy) Pro Team Italia/Imberti	(Switzerland) Mario Hytten (Italy) Marcello Gunella	Maserati Biturbo		35	

- Drivers in italics practiced in the car but did not take part in the race.

== See also ==
- 1987 World Touring Car Championship

World Touring Car Championship
Previous race: 1987 Jarama 4 Hours	1987 season	Next race: 1987 Nürburgring Touring Car Grand Prix
