= Ford C100 =

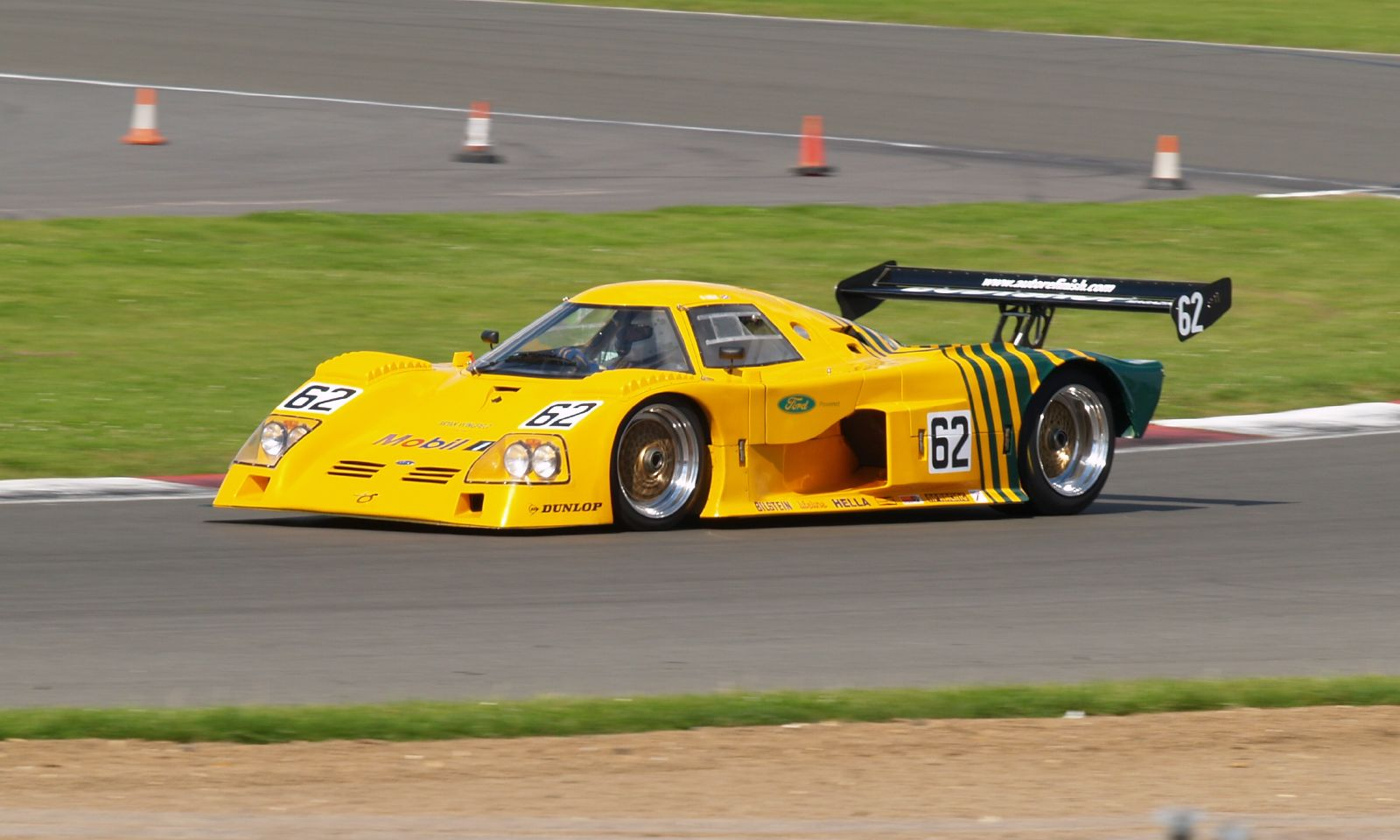
- Constructor: Ford
- Designer: Len Bailey

Technical specifications
- Engine: Cosworth DFL 3,955 cc (241.3 cu in) naturally-aspirated V8, mid-engined (1981–1982, Zakspeed C1/8); 3,299 cc (201.3 cu in) (1983); Zakspeed 1,800 cc (109.8 cu in) turbocharged I4 (Zakspeed C1/4)
- Tyres: Goodyear

Competition history
- Notable entrants: Ford Werke AG/Zakspeed (1981–1982); Peer Racing (1983)
- Debut: 1981 1000 km Brands Hatch (C100); 1983 Zolder (Zakspeed C1/4 and C1/8)
Races	Wins
19 (22 entries, C100); 20 (21 entries, Zakspeed C1/4); 47 (50 entries, Zakspeed C1/8)	3 (C100); 1 (Zakspeed C1/4); 5 (Zakspeed C1/8)
- Drivers' Championships: 1984 Interserie (Zakspeed C1/8)

The Ford C100 is a sports racing car, initially built and run as a Group 6 car, but later as a Group C car. The C100 was built by Ford in 1981, and initially featured a 4-litre Cosworth DFL V8 engine, which was replaced by a 3.3-litre version of the same engine in 1983, after the car had passed to private hands. Five cars are known to have been built. Although the cars were often very quick in qualifying (when they had been fully developed), reliability problems plagued them, and restricted their successes to two Deutsche Rennsport Meisterschaft victories in 1982, and a single Thundersports victory in 1983.

Following the end of Ford's involvement in the C100 project in 1983, Zakspeed modified one of the chassis into the C1/4, which used a 1.8-litre turbocharged in-line 4 from their Group 5 Ford Capri. The C100 was also evolved into the Zakspeed C1/8, which used the 4-litre Cosworth DFL in a C1/4 chassis. The Zakspeed cars would prove to be far more successful than the C100 had ever been, and Klaus Niedzwiedz used a C1/8 to win the Interserie in 1984.

== Design and development ==
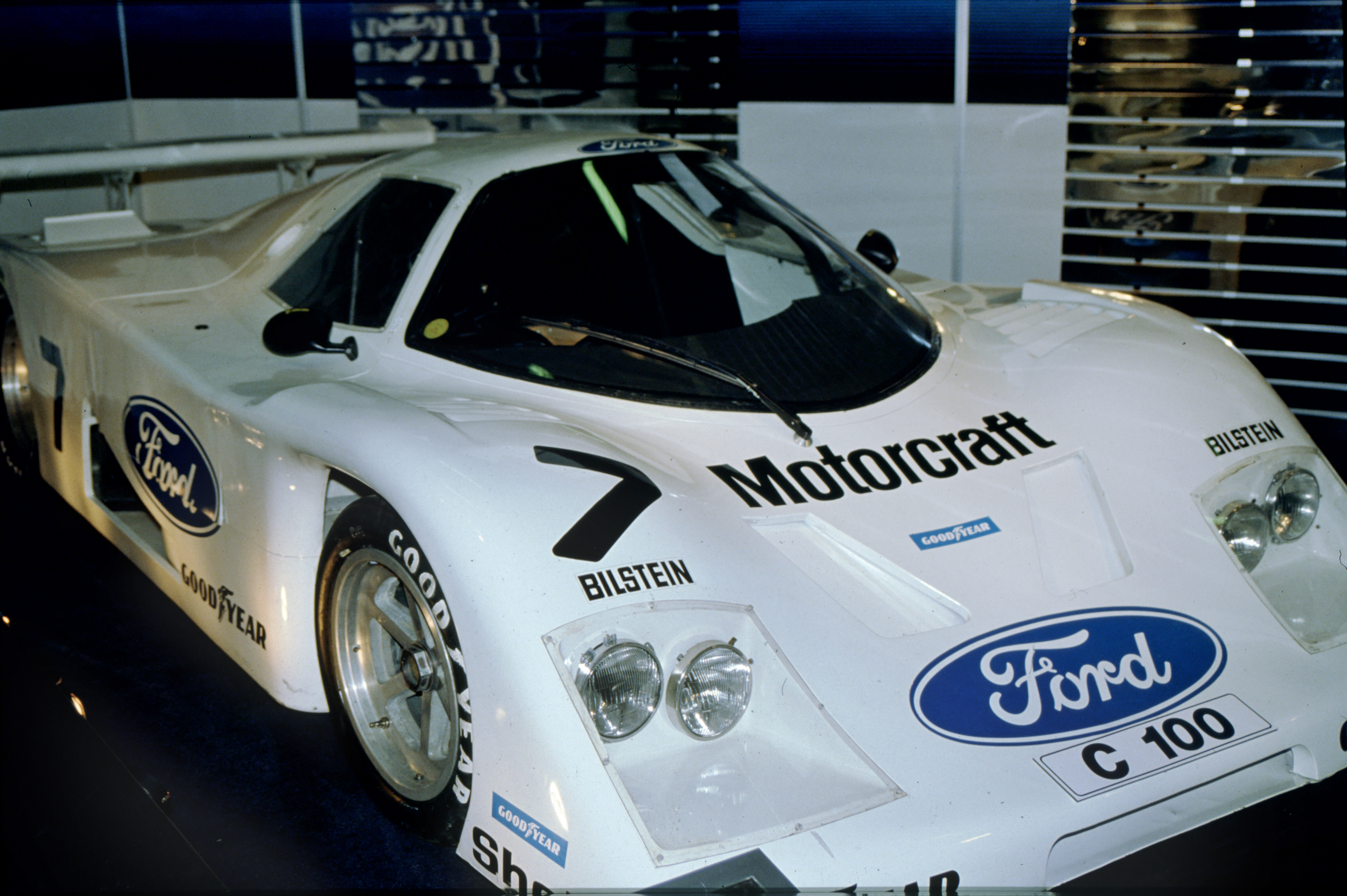
An early C100 on display

Ford Motor Company began the C100 project in 1981, with Len Bailey, who had also been involved on the successful GT40 project in the past, being the man whom was selected to design it. Bailey penned a car with a shovelled nose at the front, and a lofty decking at the rear, and the car was designed to use a Cosworth V8. However, Bailey soon became disillusioned with the project, and left prior to the development of an updated version for the 1982 season. Tony Southgate was soon called in to look at the C100, and was unimpressed by the car. He stated that the steering rack was misplaced, and that the rear suspension looked like it was designed for a totally different car. The original C100s used a simple aluminium chassis, but an updated model, initially built for Alain de Cadenet, used a stronger aluminium honeycomb chassis. Thompson redesigned the suspension at both ends of the car, which led to a significant reduction in lap time. Impressed with his work, Ford offered Thompson a deal to redevelop the C100 for the 1983 season. Thompson promptly redeveloped the car from scratch, bar its windscreen, and the redeveloped C100s used the same aluminium honeycomb monocoque as the de Cadenet car had, whilst the body was initially made out of glassfibre. Thompson and Keith Duckworth worked on a turbocharged version of the Cosworth DFL V8 engine, and its installation in the C100's chassis. However, a week after the new C100 had undergone its maiden test at Paul Ricard, albeit with a regular DFL as the new engine was not yet ready, Ford pulled the plug on the C100 project. Thompson claimed that the updated C100 developed 4,000 lb (1,814 kg) of downforce in its sprint race configuration, and that it was superior to the Porsche 956. The C100 did, however, suffer from high-speed understeer during the test; Thompson put it down to having a low proportion of front-end downforce.

Following the end of the C100's factory development, Zakspeed, whom had helped Ford run their works programme, continued to develop the car themselves, and came up with the Zakspeed C1/4. This car had a stiffer aluminium honeycomb chassis, reworked aerodynamics, and the 1.8-litre turbocharged in-line 4 from their Ford Capri Group 5 car, which produced around 560 hp (568 PS; 418 kW). Zakspeed also produced a version of the C1/4 with a 4-litre Cosworth DFL V8, which was dubbed the C1/8.

== Racing history ==
=== 1981 ===
Although Ford attempted to enter the C100 in the 1981 24 Hours of Le Mans, they did not actually attend the event; instead, the car made its début at the Brands Hatch 1000 km three months later. Manfred Winkelhock and Klaus Ludwig were selected to drive the works-entered car, and took a debut pole by 1.1 seconds from the works Lola T600 of Guy Edwards and Emilio de Villota. Unfortunately for Ford, a gearbox failure forced the car out after 40 laps, and the Edwards/de Villota Lola went on to win the race.

=== 1982 ===
For 1982, four further cars were built, and the cars were used in both the Deutsche Rennsport Meisterschaft (DRM), and the FIA World Endurance Championship (WEC). In his C100, which had now been reclassified as a Group C car, Ludwig opened the 1982 season with a retirement at Zolder, which held the opening round of the DRM, before taking tenth in the second round, held at Hockenheimring (although he had retired after 17 laps, he had completed enough to be classified.) Ford Germany ran one C100 at the 1000 km Monza, which opened the WEC season; Winkelhock, Ludwig and Marc Surer drove C100 #02, although Ford had also initially entered Surer alongside Klaus Niedzwiedz in C100 #03 as a second entry. Yet again, however, the C100 retired; this time due to overheating after 18 laps. Ludwig then missed the Nürburgring round of the DRM, whilst Surer and Niedzwiedz both missed the 6 Hours of Silverstone. However, Winkelhock and Ludwig did attend the latter event, and became the first drivers to finish a race with the C100; eighth, and fifth in the Group C category, was where they finished. The pair retired again in the 1000 km Nürburgring, having suffered a differential failure after 31 laps, but this was enough to classify them in twentieth.

The 24 Hours of Le Mans provided even less success; Ford entered four cars, but only two ever competed. Surer and Ludwig drove C100 chassis #04, whilst Winkelhock and Niedzwiedz drove the #03 chassis, but both retired due to electrical failure after 71 and 67 laps respectively. Two C100s were entered at the Norisring round of the DRM, with Winkelhock and Ludwig being selected to drive them. Winkelhock brought his car home in second place, for the C100's first podium, finishing one second behind the Porsche 956 of Jochen Mass, whilst Ludwig finished in eighth, two laps behind the leading duo. The next round, held at Hockenheimring, saw Ludwig go one better than Winkelhock's performance at Norisring, as he won the race by just under five seconds from Niedzwiedz in a Zakspeed Capri Turbo, although Winkelhock retired due to ignition problems after 11 laps. The DRM then held its third Hockenheim round of the season, but Ludwig retired with transmission problems after 28 laps. The C100 then returned to international competition in the 1000 km Spa, where Surer and Ludwig drove the #05 car, and Winkelhock partnered Niedzwiedz in the #03 car. Once again, however, it was unsuccessful; the Surer/Ludwig car retired due to fuel pump failure after 124 laps, whilst the other C100 finished the race, but only completed 123 laps, and was classified in eighteenth overall, ninth in the Group C category.

Two C100s were entered in the DRM season finale, once again held at Nürburgring; however only one actually raced. Ludwig drove his C100 to victory, beating Niedzwiedz's Capri by over 37 seconds. Ford ended the season by entering three cars at the Brands Hatch 1000 km; Surer, Ludwig and Winkelhock in C100 #03, Winkelhock and Niedzwiedz in C100 #05, whilst Jonathan Palmer and Desiré Wilson were entered in C100 #04. The C100s were dominant in qualifying, with the Surer/Ludwig/Winkelhock car taking pole, and the Winkelhock/Niedzwiedz car taking second; the works Lancia LC1s in third and fourth were nearly two seconds slower, although the Palmer/Wilson C100 was qualified in eighth. Although the Winkelhock/Niedzwiedz car was badly damaged in an enormous accident after four laps, both of the other C100s finished; Palmer and Wilson brought their car home in fourth, and second in class, whilst the Surer/Ludwig/Winkelhock car finished directly behind them. Ludwig was the highest placed C100 driver in both the WEC and the DRM, as he finished joint-39th in the WEC, with eleven points, and fourth in the DRM, with 83 points.

=== 1983 ===
For 1983, Ford ended the C100 program, and sold C100 #04 to Peer Racing, who promptly replaced the 4-litre Cosworth DFL engine with a 3.3-litre version. Peer Racing entered David Kennedy and Martin Birrane in the new Thundersports series, but the pair crashed out of the season opener, held at Brands Hatch. They then attempted to enter the 1000 km Silverstone, which was part of the WEC, but did not attend the event. The team then entered the second Brands Hatch round of the Thundersports season, and took second, finishing a lap down on the Lola T530-Chevrolet Can-Am of John Foulston and Brian Cocks. François Migault joined the team for the 24 Hours of Le Mans, but a fuel pressure problem forced the team into retirement after 16 laps. Kennedy and Birane then retired again in the Thruxton round of the Thundersports series, after a puncture caused the suspension to fail after nine laps. Jim Crawford replaced Birrane at Donington Park, and the car took its last ever victory, winning by a lap over the Lola T594-Mazda of Pete Lovett and Jeff Allam. This would also prove to be the car's last ever finish; an accident in practice prevented Birrane and Kennedy from running the car in the Brands Hatch 1000 km, whilst Kennedy and Rupert Keegan crashed out of the final race of the Thundersports season, also held at Brands Hatch. This proved to be the last time a C100 was entered in a major race.

Zakspeed, meanwhile, initially focused on the DRM, and had both a C1/4 and a C1/8 ready for the opening round of the season, which was held at Zolder. Ludwig drove the C1/4, whilst Niedzwiedz drove the C1/8, but neither driver was classified at the end of the race. Although Ludwig was not classified at the following round, held at the Hockenheimring, Niedzwiedz won the race by over a minute, and took the fastest lap in the process. AVUS saw a turbo failure put Ludwig out after 3 laps, but Niedzwiedz came home in third. Ludwig finished for the first time at the next round, held at Mainz Finthen Airport; he came home second, whilst Niedzwiedz finished fifth. Although neither car finished at Norisring, Ludwig led Niedzwiedz home at Diepholz in second place. Niedzwiedz thus finished the season in third place, whilst Ludwig took fifth. Following the end of the season, Zakspeed turned their attention to the Interserie. At Siegerland, Jörg van Ommen drove the C1/4, whilst Niedzwiedz remained with the C1/8; although the latter retired after 21 laps with differential problems, van Ommen won the race and took the fastest lap. He followed this by taking second in the second race, whilst Niedzwiedz was unable to make the start of that race. For the final race of the season at Hockenheim, Ludwig was back in the C1/4, and finished second, whilst the C1/8 was not used at this event. Despite only competing in two races, van Ommen finished sixth in the driver's standings.

=== 1984 ===
In 1984, the C1/4 was not used, and the C1/8 ran a full season in both the DRM and the Interserie. Although the C1/8 was not used in the opening round of the season, Niedzwiedz took victory in the next round at Zeltweg, winning both heats in the process. He followed this with another dominant victory at the Nürburgring. The C1/8 was then entered in the opening Norisring round of the DRM season, but gearbox issues restricted Niedzwiedz to tenth place, last of the classified drivers. Jochen Dauer, meanwhile, had driven a second C1/8, but he could do no better than seventh. Niedzwiedz dominated again in the next round of the Interserie, held at Erding, but the team's attempt to run the C1/8 at the 1000 km Nürburgring ended with a driveshaft failure after two laps. At the Diepholz round of the DRM, Niedzwiedz came home fourth, and he followed this with another win in the Interserie, this time at Most. For the first time that year, Niedzwiedz came second in the following race at Siegerland, beaten by Henri Pescarolo in a Joest Porsche 956. A fourth-place finish in the Nürburgring round of the DRM followed, before Niedzwiedz retired from the final round of the Interserie, which was also held at the Nürburgring. Niedzwiedz took the driver's championship in the 1984 by 20 points from Roland Binder in the Lola T296 BMW, whilst finishing twelfth in the DRM driver's standings.

=== 1985 ===
In 1985, Zakspeed once again began to use the C1/4. Niedzwiedz remained with the team and the C1/8 in order to defend his Interserie crown, and he began the season with a fourth at the Nürburgring and a third at Hockenheim. For Wunstorf, Niedzwiedz switched to the C1/4, and finished fourth once again. Niedzwiedz remained in the C1/4 for AVUS, and Franz Konrad drove the C1/8; however, Niedzwiedz retired from the second heat and, despite winning the first heat, came sixth overall, and Konrad only competed in the second race. Niedzwiedz was the only Zakspeed driver at Zeltweg, but he had problems in the second heat and was not officially classified. Jan Thoelke was selected to drive the C1/8 at Erding, and he took fifth, with the Kumsan Tiger Team taking over that car; Niedzwiedz, in his C1/4, took second. Both teams then went to the first, and only, dedicated DRM race of that season, held at Norisring; Thoelke did not start the race, and Niedzwiedz came home in 13th. Kumsan Tiger Team then took their C1/8 to the 1000 km Hockenheim, part of the WEC, but only completed 77 laps and were not classified. Both teams then returned to the Interserie; Konrad replaced Niedzwiedz at Zakspeed, but was not classified after not competing in the second race, whilst Thoelke came home sixth. Although Niedzwiedz was supposed to return to Zakspeed for the next round at Most, no Zakspeed entry ran in that race; Thoelke came home fifth in his car. For Siegerland, Ludwig had returned to Zakspeed, and he finished third, whilst Thoelke took another fifth-place finish. Ludwig repeated the feat at the Nürburgring, whilst Thoelke was not classified. Niedzwiedz finished the season in ninth place in the driver's championship, whilst Thoelke was 13th, Ludwig 18th, and Konrad 19th.

=== 1986 ===
The C1/4 was retired at the end of 1985, and never ran again. Zakspeed selected Dauer to drive their C1/8, whilst Thoelke drove in several events in his C1/8, both as a privateer and under the Derichs Rennwagen banner. The first appearance of 1986 for both C1/8 entries came at the Hockenheim round of the 1986 Supercup, which had replaced the DRM; Dauer retired, whilst Thoelke finished ninth. Both teams ran at the next ADAC Supercup event, which was the 100 Miles of Norisring and also formed part of the World Sports Prototype Championship; both cars retired without completing half of the race distance. Dauer then switched back to the Interserie for the Zeltweg round, and was classified in seventh place. He followed this with eighth place at both Most and Siegerland, whilst several entries for Thoelke did not actually result in any racing. Dauer was not classified in the Nürburgring Supersprint round of the Supercup, and finished the Interserie season with a fourth place at the second Zeltweg round. He was classified in 13th in the Interserie. Dauer then entered the C1/8 privately at the 500 km Kyalami, but retired on lap 61 with fuel injection issues.

=== Later years ===
In 1987, the C1/8 was only used twice. It was now permanently in Dauer's hands, and, driving for Victor Dauer Racing, he raced at Hockenheim and Most, taking fifth in the latter; however, he spent most of the season driving a Porsche 962C, and would eventually take fifth overall in the driver's standings. The C1/8 did not figure in Dauer's plans at all for 1988, and instead, Mike Baretta was chosen to drive it. However, by now, it was past its best, and Baretta never finished any higher than tenth overall in any round. However, it was at least fairly reliable, and this helped him to finish joint-fifth in the driver's championship, level with Walter Lechner; he was also the highest placed non-Porsche driver. The C1/8 never raced again after the end of the 1988 season.
