= 1987 Grand Prix Brno =

(Czechoslovakia) 1987 Grand Prix Brno
Race details
- Round 6 of 11 in the 1987 World Touring Car Championship at Masaryk Circuit in Brno, Czechoslovakia.
- Date: 16 August, 1987
- Location: Brno, Czechoslovakia
- Course: Masaryk Circuit; 5.403 kilometres (3.357 mi)
- Laps: 93
Pole position
Driver		(West Germany) Klaus Ludwig	Eggenberger Motorsport
Time		2:10.510	
Podium
First		(West Germany) Klaus Ludwig (West Germany) Klaus Niedzwiedz	Eggenberger Motorsport
Second		(United Kingdom) Steve Soper (Belgium) Pierre Dieudonné	Eggenberger Motorsport
Third		(Spain) Luis Pérez-Sala (France) Olivier Grouillard	Bigazzi
Fastest Lap
Driver		(West Germany) Klaus Ludwig	Eggenberger Motorsport
Time		2:09.080	

The 1987 Grand Prix Brno was the sixth round of the inaugural World Touring Car Championship. The race was held for cars eligible for Group A touring car regulations. It was held on August 16, 1987, at the Masaryk Circuit, in Brno, Czechoslovakia.

The race was won by the Eggenberger Motorsport pairing of Klaus Ludwig and Klaus Niedzwiedz. They drove the newly homologated Ford Sierra RS500, which proved much faster and far more reliable than the Ford Sierra RS Cosworths the team had been using to that point of the season.

== Class structure ==
Cars were divided into three classes based on engine capacity:

- Division 1: 1-1600cc
- Division 2: 1601-2500cc
- Division 3: Over 2500cc

== Official results ==
Results were as follows:

Pos	Class	No	Team	Drivers	Car	Laps	Qual Pos	Series Points
1	3	7	(Switzerland) Eggenberger Motorsport	(West Germany) Klaus Ludwig (West Germany) Klaus Niedzwiedz	Ford Sierra RS500	93	1	40
2	3	6	(Switzerland) Eggenberger Motorsport	(United Kingdom) Steve Soper (Belgium) Pierre Dieudonné	Ford Sierra RS500	93	2	30
3	2	43	(Italy) Bigazzi	(Spain) Luis Pérez-Sala (France) Olivier Grouillard	BMW M3	92	10	32
4	2	46	(West Germany) BMW Motorsport	(Austria) Roland Ratzenberger (Italy) Roberto Ravaglia (West Germany) Markus Oestreich	BMW M3	92	6	25
5	2	42	(Italy) CiBiEmme Sport	(Venezuela) Johnny Cecotto (Italy) Gianfranco Brancatelli	BMW M3	92	7	20
6	2	80	(Sweden) Q-Racing	(Sweden) Thomas Lindström (Sweden) Steven Andskär	Alfa Romeo 75	91	13	16
7	2	52	BMW Alpina	(West Germany) Andreas Bovensiepen (France) Fabien Giroix (West Germany) Ellen Lohr	BMW M3	91	8	
8	2	48	(Italy) CiBiEmme Sport	(Switzerland) Enzo Calderari (Italy) Luciano Lovato	BMW M3	91	14	
9	2	78	(Italy) Brixia Corse	(Italy) Carlo Rossi (Italy) Alessandro Santin	Alfa Romeo 75	91	17	12
10	2	75	(Italy) Alfa Corse	(France) Jacques Laffite (Italy) Paolo Barilla	Alfa Romeo 75	90		9
11	3	19	(Italy) CiBiEmme Sport	(Italy) Roberto Castagna (Italy) Roberto Orlandi	BMW 635CSi	89		
12	2	76	(Italy) Alfa Corse	(Italy) Walter Voulaz (Italy) Marcello Cipriani; D'Avanzu	Alfa Romeo 75	88	22	6
13	2	51	ÚAMK	(Czechoslovakia) Oldřich Vaníček (Czechoslovakia) Vlastimil Tomášek	BMW M3	88	19	
14	3	11	Wolf Racing Barclay	(West Germany) Joachim Winkelhock (West Germany) Frank Biela	Ford Sierra RS500	88	4	
15	2	47	(West Germany) BMW Motorsport	(West Germany) Anette Meeuvissen (Austria) Mercedes Stermitz	BMW M3	87	25	
16	2	49	Külker SC Team	(Hungary) József Cserkuti (West Germany) Anton Fischhaber (Hungary) Péter Moczár	BMW M3	87		
17	2	77	(Italy) Brixia Corse	(Italy) Gabriele Tarquini (Italy) Rinaldo Drovandi	Alfa Romeo 75	87	15	4
18	2	86		(West Germany) Wolfgang Böhme (West Germany) Bernd Herlitze (West Germany) Rolf Göring	BMW 325i	86		
19	1	95		(Czechoslovakia) Antonín Charouz (West Germany) Georg Alber (West Germany) Helmut Maier	Toyota Corolla GT	84	32	
20	1	93	Gruen Racing Team	(Sweden) Stig Gruen (Denmark) Eric Hoyer	Toyota Corolla GT	83		
21	2	58	Racing Services International	(Czechoslovakia) Miloš Bychl (Socialist Federal Republic of Yugoslavia) Dagmar Šuster	BMW 325i	83		
22	1	100	(Italy) Alfa Romeo	(Italy) Carlo Brambilla (Belgium) Alain Thiebaut	Alfa Romeo 33	81		
23	2	59	Racing Services International	(Czechoslovakia) Zdeněk Vojtěch (Czechoslovakia) Břetislav Enge	BMW M3	80	16	
24	3	1	(Italy) Pro Team Italia/Imberti	(Italy) Bruno Giacomelli (West Germany) Armin Hahne (Italy) Marcello Gunella	Maserati Biturbo	78	12	12
25	2	84	Helmut König	(Austria) Helmut König (Austria) Karl Baron (Austria) Heribert Werginz	BMW M3	77		
26	1	96	Fina Racing Team	(France) Michel Legourd (Belgium) Jean Yves Van Heukelom (France) Jean-Claude Barthe	Toyota Corolla GT	74		
DNF	3	18	(Italy) CiBiEmme Sport	(Switzerland) Georges Bosshard (Italy) Bruno Corradi	BMW 635CSi	75		
DNF	2	53	Racing Services International	(Belgium) Dirk Vermeersch (Belgium) Eddy Joosen	BMW M3	73	18	
DNF	1	115	(Italy) Scuderia Alfasud	(Austria) Peter Schöller (West Germany) Dieter Kuppi	Alfa Romeo Alfasud	66		
DNF	1	102	(West Germany) Seikel Motorsport	(Switzerland) Heinz Wirth (West Germany) Peter Seikel (Austria) Lothar Schörg	Audi 80	52		
DNF	1	112	Team Motorsport Praha	(Czechoslovakia) Antonín Charouz (Italy) Pierluigi Grassetto (Italy) Daniele Toffoli	Toyota Corolla GT	44		
DNF	1	90	Toyota Schweiz AG	(West Germany) Herbert Lingmann (West Germany) Ludwig Hölzl	Toyota Corolla GT	32		
DNF	2	57	(Austria) Marko AMG	(West Germany) Peter Oberndorfer (Austria) Franz Klammer	Mercedes 190E	31	23	
DNF	3	8	(United Kingdom) Andy Rouse Engineering	(United Kingdom) Andy Rouse (Belgium) Thierry Tassin	Ford Sierra RS500	29	3	
DNF	2	40	(West Germany) Schnitzer Motorsport	(Italy) Roberto Ravaglia (Italy) Emanuele Pirro (West Germany) Markus Oestreich	BMW M3	2	5	
DNF	2	79	(Italy) Alfa Corse	(Italy) Giorgio Francia (Italy) Nicola Larini	Alfa Romeo 75	0	9	
DNS	3	23		(Hungary) József Cserkuti (Hungary) Péter Moczár	BMW 635CSi			

- Drivers in italics practiced in the car but did not take part in the race.

== See also ==
- 1987 World Touring Car Championship

World Touring Car Championship
Previous race: 1987 Spa 24 Hour	1987 season	Next race: 1987 RAC Tourist Trophy
