= 1986 European Touring Car Championship =

Seasons
- ← 1985 1987 →

The 1986 European Touring Car Championship, known in 1986 as the FIA Touring Car Championship, was the 24th season of the European Touring Car Championship. The championship was run to the FIA's international Group A touring car regulations.

== Drivers and Teams ==
=== Participants ===
Number	Winning team	Drivers	Division	Class
1	RAS Sport	(Venezuela) Johnny Cecotto (Sweden) Thomas Lindström	Volvo 240T	3
2	RAS Sport	(Sweden) Ulf Granberg (Sweden) Anders Olofsson	Volvo 240T	3
3	Eggenberger Motorsport	(Germany) Klaus Niedzwiedz (United Kingdom) Steve Soper	Ford Sierra XR4Ti	3
4	Eggenberger Motorsport	(Germany) Siegfried Muller Jr (Belgium) Pierre Diedounné	Ford Sierra XR4Ti	3
5	Holden Dealer Team	(Australia) Peter Brock (Canada) Allan Moffat	Holden Commodore VK	3
7	TWR – Bastos Texaco Racing Team	(France) Jean-Louis Schlesser (Germany) Armin Hahne	Rover Vitesse	3
8	TWR – Bastos Texaco Racing Team	(United Kingdom) Tom Walkinshaw (United Kingdom) Win Percy	Rover Vitesse	3
9	TWR – Bastos Texaco Racing Team TWR – Istel.ARF/BCA	(Germany) Armin Hahne (Italy) Gianfranco Brancatelli (United Kingdom) Jeff Allam (New Zealand) Denny Hulme	Rover Vitesse	3
10	Schnitzer Motorsport	(Italy) Roberto Ravaglia (Austria) Gerhard Berger	BMW 635 CSi	3
11	Schnitzer Motorsport	(Austria) Dieter Quester (Italy) Emanuele Pirro	BMW 635 CSi	
12	BMW Belgium/Schnitzer	(Austria) Dieter Quester (Germany) Altfrid Heger (Belgium) Thierry Tassin	BMW 635 CSi	
Rd. 12	RAS Sport	(Venezuela) Johnny Cecotto (Sweden) Thomas Lindström	Volvo 240T	

== European Touring Car Championship ==
Champion: (Italy) Roberto Ravaglia

Runner Up: (United Kingdom) Win Percy

=== Results ===
Date	Round	Circuit	Winning drivers	Winning team	Winning car	Results
23/03	Rd. 1	(Italy) Monza	(United Kingdom) Tom Walkinshaw (United Kingdom) Win Percy	TWR – Bastos Texaco Racing Team	Rover Vitesse	Results
06/04	Rd. 2	(United Kingdom) Donington Park	(United Kingdom) Tom Walkinshaw (United Kingdom) Win Percy	TWR – Bastos Texaco Racing Team	Rover Vitesse	Results
13/04	Rd. 3	(Germany) Hockenheim	(Venezuela) Johnny Cecotto (Sweden) Thomas Lindström	RAS Sport	Volvo 240T	Results
04/05	Rd. 4	(Italy) Misano	(Italy) Roberto Ravaglia (Austria) Gerhard Berger	Schnitzer Motorsport	BMW 635 CSi	Results
18/05	Rd. 5	(Sweden) Anderstorp	(Italy) Gianfranco Brancatelli (Germany) Armin Hahne	TWR – Bastos Texaco Racing Team	Rover Vitesse	Results
08/06	Rd. 6	(Czechoslovakia) Brno	(Sweden) Ulf Granberg (Sweden) Thomas Lindström	RAS Sport	Volvo 240T	Results
15/06	Rd. 7	(Austria) Österreichring	(Germany) Armin Hahne (United Kingdom) Win Percy	TWR – Bastos Texaco Racing Team	Rover Vitesse	Results
13/07	Rd. 8	(Germany) Nürburgring	(Italy) Roberto Ravaglia (Italy) Emanuele Pirro	Schnitzer Motorsport	BMW 635 CSi	Results
02-03/08	Rd. 9	(Belgium) Spa-Francorchamps	(Austria) Dieter Quester (Germany) Altfrid Heger (Belgium) Thierry Tassin	BMW Belgium/Schnitzer	BMW 635 CSi	Results
15/08	Rd. 10	(United Kingdom) Silverstone	(United Kingdom) Jeff Allam (New Zealand) Denny Hulme	TWR – Istel.ARF/BCA	Rover Vitesse	Results
14/09	Rd. 11	(France) Nogaro	(Italy) Roberto Ravaglia (Austria) Gerhard Berger	Schnitzer Motorsport	BMW 635 CSi	Results
28/09	Rd. 12	(Belgium) Zolder	(Venezuela) Johnny Cecotto (Sweden) Thomas Lindström	RAS Sport	Volvo 240T	Results
12/10	Rd. 13	(Spain) Jarama	(Italy) Roberto Ravaglia (Italy) Emanuele Pirro	Schnitzer Motorsport	BMW 635 CSi	Results
19/10	Rd. 14	(Portugal) Estoril	(Germany) Klaus Niedzwiedz (United Kingdom) Steve Soper	Eggenberger Motorsport	Ford Sierra XR4Ti	Results

=== Table – Drivers ===
Place	Driver	Team	Car	Total
1	(Italy) Roberto Ravaglia	Schnitzer Motorsport	BMW 635 CSi	211 (220)
2	(United Kingdom) Win Percy	TWR – Bastos Texaco Racing Team	Rover Vitesse	203 (247)
3	(United Kingdom) Tom Walkinshaw	TWR – Bastos Texaco Racing Team	Rover Vitesse	190 (218)
4	(West Germany) Winfried Vogt	Linder Rennsport	BMW 325i	189 (221)
5	(West Germany) Markus Oestreich	Linder Rennsport	BMW 325i	161
6	(Sweden) Thomas Lindström	RAS Sport	Volvo 240T	149
7	(West Germany) Ludwig Hölzl		Toyota Corolla GT AE86	147 (157)
8	(Venezuela) Johnny Cecotto	RAS Sport	Volvo 240T	144 (147)
9=	(Denmark) Erik Høyer	Team Toyota Castrol	Toyota Corolla GT AE86	143
9=	(Austria) Dieter Quester	Schnitzer Motorsport	BMW 635 CSi	143 (156)
11	(West Germany) Armin Hahne	TWR – Bastos Texaco Racing Team	Rover Vitesse	142
12	(Italy) Gianfranco Brancatelli	TWR – Bastos Texaco Racing Team	Rover Vitesse	123
etc.

=== Table – Manufacturers ===
Place	Manufacturer	Division	Total
1	(Japan) Toyota	1	180 (267)
2	(Germany) BMW	2	180 (254)
3	(Germany) BMW	3	160 (209)
4	(United Kingdom) Rover	3	157 (201)
5	(Germany) Mercedes-Benz	2	152 (198)
6	(Sweden) Volvo	3	132 (148)
7	(Germany) Audi	1	124 (148)
8	(Germany) Volkswagen	1	89 (95)
9	(United States) Ford	3	88 (93)
10	(Italy) Alfa Romeo	2	73 (83)
