= 1987 RAC Tourist Trophy =

(United Kingdom) 1987 RAC Tourist Trophy
Race details
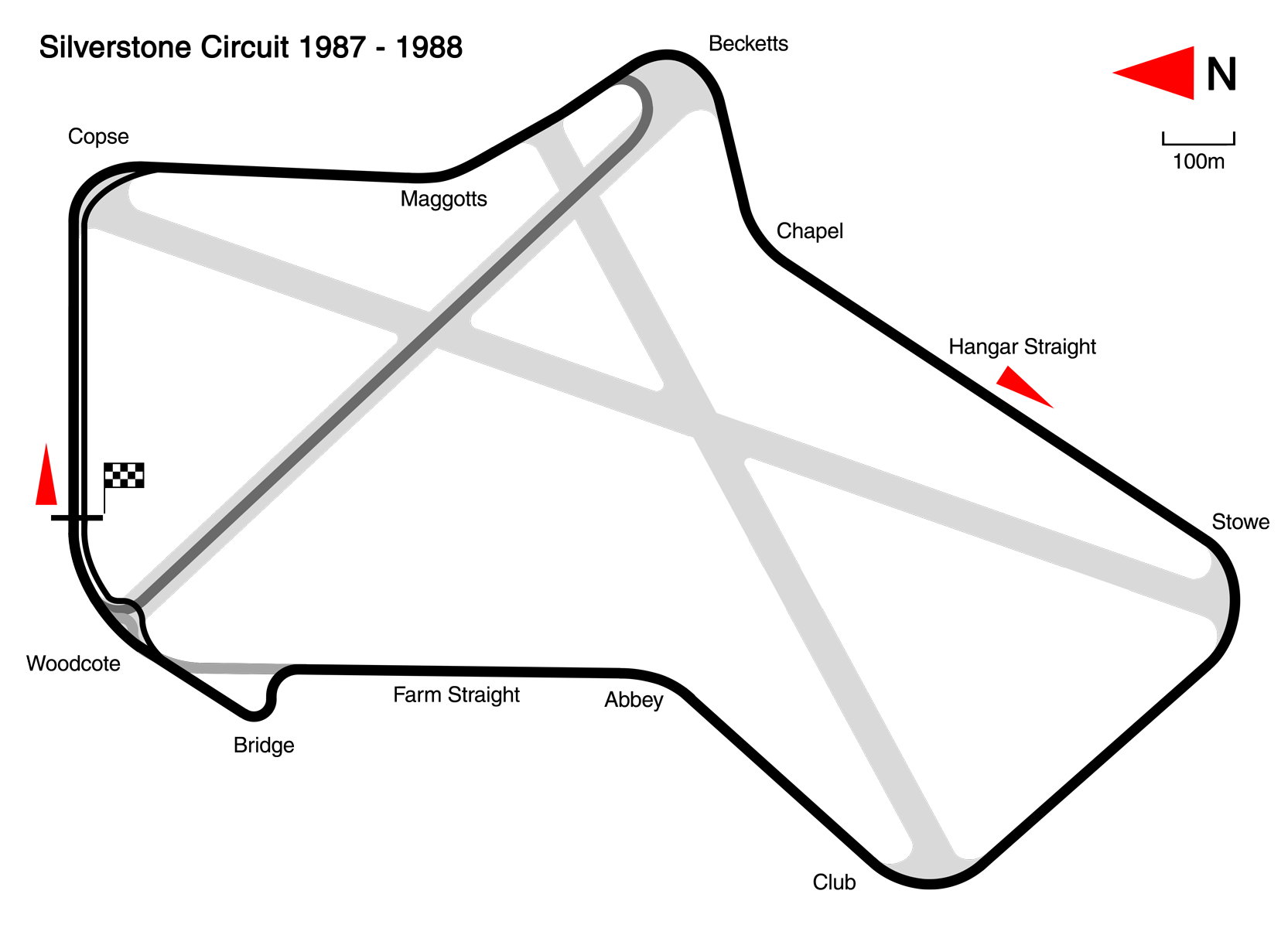
- Round 7 of 11 in the 1987 World Touring Car Championship at Silverstone Circuit in Silverstone, United Kingdom.
- Date: 6 September, 1987
- Location: Silverstone, United Kingdom
- Course: Silverstone Circuit; 4.778 kilometres (2.969 mi)
- Laps: 105
Pole position
Driver		(United Kingdom) Steve Soper	Eggenberger Motorsport
Time		1:35.780	
Podium
First		(Switzerland) Enzo Calderari (Italy) Fabio Mancini	CiBiEmme Sport
Second		(Italy) Emanuele Pirro (Italy) Roberto Ravaglia (Austria) Roland Ratzenberger	BMW Motorsport
Third		(Italy) Giorgio Francia (Italy) Nicola Larini	Alfa Corse
Fastest Lap
Driver		(United Kingdom) Steve Soper	Eggenberger Motorsport
Time		1:48.060	

The 1987 RAC Tourist Trophy was the seventh round of the inaugural World Touring Car Championship. The race was held for cars eligible for Group A touring car regulations. It was held on 6 September 1987 at the Silverstone Circuit, in Silverstone, United Kingdom.

The race was won by Enzo Calderari and Fabio Mancini, driving a BMW M3. The leading car eligible for championship points was another M3, driven by Emanuele Pirro, Roberto Ravaglia and Roland Ratzenberger, who finished in second place.

== Class structure ==
Cars were divided into three classes based on engine capacity:

- Division 1: 1-1600cc
- Division 2: 1601-2500cc
- Division 3: Over 2500cc

== Official results ==
Results were as follows:

Pos	Class	No	Team	Drivers	Car	Laps	Qual Pos	Series Points
1	2	48	(Italy) CiBiEmme Sport	(Switzerland) Enzo Calderari (Italy) Fabio Mancini	BMW M3	105	10	
2	2	46	(Germany) BMW Motorsport	(Italy) Roberto Ravaglia (Italy) Emanuele Pirro (Austria) Roland Ratzenberger	BMW M3	105	7	40
3	2	79	(Italy) Alfa Corse	(Italy) Giorgio Francia (Italy) Nicola Larini	Alfa Romeo 75	105	14	30
4	2	57	(Germany) Marko AMG	(Germany) Peter Oberndorfer (Austria) Franz Klammer	Mercedes 190E	104	11	
5	2	78	(Italy) Brixia Corse	(Italy) Carlo Rossi (Italy) Alessandro Santin	Alfa Romeo 75	104	17	24
6	3	7	(Switzerland) Eggenberger Motorsport	(Germany) Klaus Ludwig (Germany) Klaus Niedzwiedz	Ford Sierra RS500	103	3	30
7	2	72	(United Kingdom) Prodrive	(United Kingdom) Frank Sytner (Belgium) Marc Duez (United Kingdom) Mike Smith	BMW M3	103	15	
8	2	84	Helmut König	(Austria) Helmut König (Austria) Karl Baron (Austria) Heribert Werginz	BMW M3	103	19	
9	3	4	Wolf Racing Barclay	(Germany) Joachim Winkelhock (United Kingdom) Jeff Allam	Ford Sierra RS500	103	5	
10	2	75	(Italy) Alfa Corse	(France) Jacques Laffite (Italy) Paolo Barilla	Alfa Romeo 75	102	12	18
11	3	31	CMS Sweden	(Sweden) Christer Simonsen (Sweden) Kurt Simonsen	Volvo 240T	102	24	
12	3	1	(Italy) Pro Team Italia	(Switzerland) Mario Hytten (Germany) Armin Hahne (Italy) Nicola Tesini	Maserati Biturbo	100	16	21
13	3	6	(Switzerland) Eggenberger Motorsport	(United Kingdom) Steve Soper (Belgium) Pierre Dieudonné	Ford Sierra RS500	99	1	16
14	3	23		(Belgium) Michel Delcourt (Belgium) Alex Guyaux (United Kingdom) Jerry Mahony	Holden VL Commodore SS Group A	99	26	
15	1	106	(United Kingdom) Team Toyota GB	(United Kingdom) Chris Hodgetts (New Zealand) Andrew Bagnall	Toyota Corolla GT	98	28	
16	1	107	(United Kingdom) Team Toyota GB	(United Kingdom) Gareth Chapman (United Kingdom) Chris Hodgetts (United Kingdom) Alex Moss	Toyota Corolla GT	96	31	
17	1	114	Tom's GB Ltd.	(United Kingdom) Tiff Needell (United Kingdom) Phil Dowsett	Toyota Corolla GT	96	30	
18	2	76	(Italy) Alfa Corse	(Italy) Walter Voulaz (Italy) Marcello Cipriani	Alfa Romeo 75	96	25	11
19	2	60		(Denmark) Per G. Hansen (Denmark) Jens Winther	BMW M3	95	27	
20	1	112		(Italy) Pierluigi Grassetto (Czech Republic) Antonín Charouz	Toyota Corolla GT	94	33	
21	1	100	(Italy) Alfa Romeo	(Italy) Carlo Brambilla (Belgium) Alain Thiebaut (Italy) Daniele Toffoli	Alfa Romeo 33	93	35	22
22	1	112		(Belgium) Eddy van Esch (Switzerland) Heinz Wirth (Czech Republic) Antonín Charouz	Toyota Corolla GT	93	34	
DNF	2	43	(Italy) Bigazzi	(Spain) Luis Pérez-Sala (France) Olivier Grouillard	BMW M3	103	9	
DNF	3	8	(United Kingdom) Andy Rouse Engineering	(United Kingdom) Andy Rouse (Belgium) Thierry Tassin	Ford Sierra RS500	15	2	
DNF	3	11	(United Kingdom) Andy Rouse Engineering	(United Kingdom) Win Percy (United Kingdom) Rob Hall	Ford Sierra RS500	6	4	
DNF	3	15	RAS Sport	(Germany) Hans Heyer (Belgium) Eddy Joosen	Toyota Supra	3	21	
DNF	2	42	(Italy) CiBiEmme Sport	(Venezuela) Johnny Cecotto (Italy) Gianfranco Brancatelli	BMW M3	0	6	
DNF	2	40	(Germany) Schnitzer Motorsport	(Germany) Markus Oestreich (Austria) Roland Ratzenberger	BMW M3		8	
DNF	3	16	ICS	(United Kingdom) Tim Harvey (United Kingdom) David Sears	Rover Vitesse		13	
DNF	2	77	(Italy) Brixia Corse	(Italy) Rinaldo Drovandi (Italy) Gabriele Tarquini	Alfa Romeo 75		18	
DNF	3	24		(Netherlands) Evert Bolderheij (Netherlands) Allard Kalff	Ford Sierra RS500		20	
DNF	3	21		(United Kingdom) Vic Covey (United Kingdom) Andrew Jeffrey	Holden VL Commodore SS Group A		22	
DNF	2	62	(Germany) Schwaben Motorsport	(Germany) Thomas von Löwis (Germany) Leopold von Bayern (United Kingdom) Richard Down	BMW M3		23	
DNF	2	73		(United Kingdom) Karl Jones (United Kingdom) Alan Curnow	Ford Escort RS Turbo		29	
DNF	1	115	AGK Motorsport	(United Kingdom) Geoff Kimber-Smith (United Kingdom) Barbara Cowell	Toyota Corolla GT		32	
DNS	2	80	(Sweden) Q-Racing	(Sweden) Thomas Lindström (Sweden) Steven Andskär	Alfa Romeo 75			

- Drivers in italics practiced in the car but did not take part in the race.

== See also ==
- 1987 World Touring Car Championship

World Touring Car Championship
Previous race: 1987 Grand Prix Brno	1987 season	Next race: 1987 James Hardie 1000
