= 1987 Fuji InterTEC 500 =

(Japan) 1987 Fuji InterTEC 500
Race details
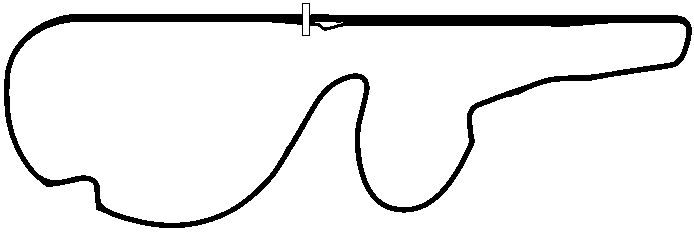
- Round 11 of 11 in the 1987 World Touring Car Championship at Fuji Speedway in Oyama, Japan.
- Date: 15 November, 1987
- Location: Oyama, Japan
- Course: Fuji Speedway; 4.440 kilometres (2.759 mi)
- Laps: 112
Pole position
Driver		(Germany) Klaus Ludwig	Ford Texaco Racing Team
Time		1:36.981	
Podium
First		(Germany) Klaus Ludwig (Germany) Klaus Niedzwiedz	Ford Texaco Racing Team
Second		(United Kingdom) Andy Rouse (Japan) Naoki Nagasaka	Rousesport
Third		(Italy) Emanuele Pirro (Italy) Roberto Ravaglia	Schnitzer Motorsport
Fastest Lap
Driver		(Germany) Klaus Ludwig	Ford Texaco Racing Team
Time		1:39.249	

The 1987 Fuji InterTEC 500 was the eleventh and final round of the inaugural World Touring Car Championship. The race was held for cars eligible for Group A touring car regulations. It was held on November 15, 1987, at the Fuji Speedway in Oyama, Japan.

== Official results ==
Pos	Class	No	Team	Drivers	Car	Laps	Qual Pos	Series Points
1	3	6	(Switzerland) Eggenberger Motorsport	(Germany) Klaus Ludwig (Germany) Klaus Niedzwiedz	Ford Sierra RS500	112	1	40
2	3	10	(United Kingdom) Rousesport	(United Kingdom) Andy Rouse (Japan) Naoki Nagasaka	Ford Sierra RS500	112	3	
3	2	46	(Germany) Schnitzer Motorsport	(Italy) Roberto Ravaglia (Italy) Emanuele Pirro	BMW M3	112	9	35
4	2	40	(Germany) Schnitzer Motorsport	(Germany) Markus Oestreich (Austria) Dieter Quester (Italy) Roberto Ravaglia	BMW M3	112	14	27
5	3	7	(Switzerland) Eggenberger Motorsport	(United Kingdom) Steve Soper (Belgium) Pierre Dieudonné	Ford Sierra RS500	112	2	25
6	2	42	(Italy) CiBiEmme	(Venezuela) Johnny Cecotto (Italy) Gianfranco Brancatelli	BMW M3	110	15	20
7	2	43	(Italy) Bigazzi	(Spain) Luis Pérez-Sala (France) Olivier Grouillard	BMW M3	110	11	16
8	2	55	(Japan) AutoTech M3	(United Kingdom) Will Hoy (Japan) Haruto Yanagida	BMW M3	110	20	
9	3	37	(Japan) Minolta Supra TOM's	(United Kingdom) Geoff Lees (Japan) Kaoru Hoshino	Toyota Supra Turbo-A	109	4	
10	3	5	(Japan) STP Mitsubishi Ralliart	(Japan) Kunimitsu Takahashi (Japan) Akihiko Nakaya	Mitsubishi Starion	109	10	
11	3	28	(Sweden) Söderqvist Racing Services Team	(Sweden) Ulf Granberg (New Zealand) Ian Tulloch	Volvo 240 Turbo	109		
12	3	26	(Japan) ADVAN Skyline RS Turbo	(Japan) Kenji Takahashi (Japan) Takao Wada	Nissan Skyline RS DR30	109		
13	1	116	(Japan) Mugen Motul Civic	(Japan) Osamu Nakako (Japan) Hideki Okada	Honda Civic	106		
14	3	20	(Japan) AutoTech BMW 635	(United Kingdom) David Scott (Japan) Takamasa Nakagawa	BMW 635 CSi	106		
15	3	23	(Japan) Nismo	(Japan) Kazuyoshi Hoshino (Sweden) Anders Olofsson	Nissan Skyline GTS-R HR31	105	5	
16	1	111		(Japan) Hisashi Yokoyama (Japan) Hisatoyo Goto	Toyota Sprinter AE86	105		
17	3	8	(Switzerland) Eggenberger Motorsport	(Germany) Armin Hahne (Germany) Bernd Schneider	Ford Sierra RS500	105	12	16
18	1	167	(Japan) Yamato Civic	(Japan) Tsuguo Oba (Japan) Katsuaki Sato	Honda Civic	105		
19	1	107	(Japan) Minolta TOM'S	(Japan) Masanori Sekiya (Japan) Hitoshi Ogawa	Toyota Corolla FX AE82	104		
20	1	118	(Japan) WedSport Civic	(Japan) Takeo Asano (Japan) Makoto Hagiwara	Toyota Corolla FX AE82	104		
21	1	160		(Japan) Hiroyuki Noji (Japan) Mutsuaki Sanada	Toyota Corolla FX AE82	103		
22	1	168	(Japan) Yamato Civic	(Japan) Ken Mizokawa (Japan) Yoshimi Watanabe	Honda Civic	103		
23	3	22	(Japan) Diesel Kiki P'Chiba	(Japan) Kenji Tohiro (Japan) Masao Kamioka	Nissan Skyline RS DR30	103		
24	1	112	(Japan) Trampio Civic	(Japan) Tomohiko Tsutsumi (Japan) Kaoru Honda	Honda Civic	100		
25	3	14		(Japan) Yasuo Ishimura (Japan) Masahiro Kimoto	Holden Commodore VK Group A SS	100		
26	1	170	(Japan) Team Gaikokuya	(Japan) Yoshimi Ishibashi (Japan) Hiroyasu Aoyagi (Japan) Fumio Aiba	Toyota Sprinter AE86	98		
27	1	100	(Italy) Scuderia Autolodi Corse S.r.l.	(Italy) Daniele Toffoli (Belgium) Alain Thibaut	Alfa Romeo 33	97	52	23
28	1	101	(Japan) Sports Car Club of Nissan	(Japan) Yoshinari Takasugi (Japan) Shinichi Katsura	Nissan Pulsar	96		
29	1	106	(Japan) ADVAN・FET・TBS Sprinter	(Japan) Tsutomu Sakurai (Japan) Kenichi Okuyama	Toyota Sprinter AE86	85		
30	1	121	(Japan) TOM'S	(Japan) Kaori Okamoto (Japan) Hideshi Matsuda	Toyota Corolla FX AE82	85		
DNF	1	115	(Japan) EPSON Civic	(Japan) Toshio Suzuki (Japan) Koji Sato	Honda Civic	100		
DNF	1	102	(Japan) COSMO OIL CIVIC	(Japan) Keiichi Tsuchiya (Japan) Yasuhiko Tanabe	Honda Civic	97		
DNF	1	117	ADVAN Japan トレドFX	(Japan) Takahashi Abe (Japan) Masakazu Hamana	Toyota Corolla FX AE82	96		
DNF	1	122	(Japan) アラミス 900トムスカローラ	(Japan) Morio Nitta (Japan) Hideo Fukuyama	Toyota Sprinter AE86	95		
DNF	3	36	(Japan) TOM's	(Sweden) Eje Elgh (Italy) Mauro Baldi	Toyota Supra Turbo-A	94	7	
DNF	3	3	DUNLOP・ARJ・ROVER	(Japan) Taku Akaike (United Kingdom) Kenny Acheson	Rover Vitesse	80		
DNF	1	128	(Japan) Wako's	(Japan) Nobuko Koike (Japan) Mitsutake Koma (Japan) Susumu Tanno	Toyota Sprinter AE86	68		
DNF	3	32	(Japan) Nismo	(Japan) Masahiro Hasemi (Japan) Aguri Suzuki	Nissan Skyline GTS-R HR31	63	6	
DNF	3	16	(Japan) Leyton House	(Japan) Hajime Kitano (Japan) Masahiko Kageyama (Japan) Ryoichi Oono	Nissan Skyline RS DR30	35		
DNF	1	161	(Japan) フジメカカローラFX GT	(Japan) Tatsuhiko Seki (Japan) Masami Ishikawa (Japan) Kazuhisa Shimura	Toyota Corolla FX AE82	33		
DNF	3	24	(Japan) Diesel Kiki Skyline	(Japan) Motoji Sekine (Japan) Masami Miyoshi	Nissan Skyline RS DR30	29		
DNF	1	125	(Japan) ADVAN COROLLA FX	(Japan) Kazuo Mogi (Japan) Tetsuya Ota	Toyota Corolla FX AE82	24		
DNF	3	30	(Japan) Team Le Mans	(Sweden) Robert Kvist (Sweden) Per-Gunnar Andersson	Volvo 240 Turbo	20		
DNF	1	109	(Japan) WedSport Corolla FX	(Japan) Yuji Nihei (Japan) Shinji Tsunashima	Toyota Corolla FX AE82	19		
DNF	1	103	(New Zealand) Gullivers Ltd	(New Zealand) Andrew Bagnall (New Zealand) Mark Jennings (United Kingdom) Chris Hodgetts	Toyota Sprinter AE86	17		
DNF	1	185	(Japan) CABIN CIVIC	(Japan) Yasuo Muramatsu (Japan) Kazuo Shimizu	Honda Civic	10		
DNS	2	47	(Germany) Schnitzer Motorsport	(Germany) Markus Oestreich (Austria) Dieter Quester (Italy) Emanuele Pirro	BMW M3			
DNS	1	99		(Japan) Keiichi Suzuki (Japan) Ryusaku Hitomi	Toyota Celica			
DNS	3	15	(Japan) Mitsubishi Ralliart	(Australia) Brad Jones (Japan) Sakae Obata	Mitsubishi Starion			

Italics indicate driver practiced this car but did not race.

== Statistics ==
- Pole Position - #7 Klaus Ludwig - 1:36.981
- Fastest Lap - #7 Klaus Ludwig - 1:39.249

World Touring Car Championship
Previous race: 1987 Wellington 500	1987 season	Next race: 2005 WTCC season
