= Markus Oestreich =

German racing driver (born 1963)

- Nationality: German
- Born: 3 July 1963 (age 63) Fulda, Kassel, West Germany

TCR International Series career
- Debut season: 2015
- Current team: Campos Racing
- Car number: 16
- Starts: 2

Previous series
- 2010–13 2002 2000 1994 1994 1990 1990 1988 1987 1987 1986–88 1985–87 1985, 88–91, 93 1985: FIA European Truck Racing Championship; V8Star Series; Renault Clio V6 Germany; Super Tourenwagen Cup; FIA Touring Car World Cup; BTCC; Porsche Carrera Cup Germany; International Formula 3000; WTCC; Formula 3 Euro Series; ETCC; Formula 3 Germany; DTM Formula Ford 2000 Germany

Markus Oestreich (born 3 July 1963) is a German racing driver currently competing in the TCR International Series. He previously competed in the British Touring Car Championship, World Touring Car Championship and Deutsche Tourenwagen Meisterschaft.

== Racing career ==
Oestreich began his career in 1985 in Formula Ford 2000 Germany, where he finished seventh in the championship standings that year. Later, he switched to the Deutsche Tourenwagen Meisterschaft, he raced in the championship for several years, ending the 1988 season fourth in the championship standings. From 1985–1987, he raced in the German Formula 3 championship. In 1986, he switched to the European Touring Car Championship, he ended fifth in the championship standings that year. He stayed in the championship up until 1988. In 1987, he also raced in the World Touring Car Championship, finishing the season 13th in the standings. Oestreich made his British Touring Car Championship debut in 1990, racing the two last rounds of the season. In 1994, he raced in the FIA Touring Car World Cup and the Super Tourenwagen Cup. In 2002, Oestreich raced in the V8Star Series, he finished the season 14th in the championship standings that year. In 2004, he won the SuperRace Truck category of the FIA European Truck Championship (which had cup status at that time). From 2010–2013, he raced in the FIA European Truck Racing Championship, he finished third in the championship in 2013. In May 2015, it was announced that Oestreich would make his TCR International Series debut with Campos Racing driving an Opel Astra OPC.

== Racing record ==
=== Complete Deutsche Tourenwagen Meisterschaft results ===
(key) (Races in bold indicate pole position) (Races in italics indicate fastest lap)

Year	Team	Car	1	2	3	4	5	6	7	8	9	10	11	12	13	14	15	16	17	18	19	20	21	22	23	24	DC	Pts
1985	Schnitzer Motorsport	BMW 635 CSi	ZOL	WUN; Ret	AVU	MFA	ERD	ERD	DIE	DIE	ZOL	SIE	NÜR														NC	0
1988	BMW M Team Zakspeed	BMW M3	ZOL; 1; 7	ZOL; 2; 3	HOC; 1; 12	HOC; 2; 12	NÜR; 1; 4	NÜR; 2; 6	BRN; 1; 31	BRN; 2; 8	AVU; 1; 6	AVU; 2; 5	MFA; 1; 3	MFA; 2; 3	NÜR; 1; 3	NÜR; 2; 2	NOR; 1; 9	NOR; 2; 16									**3rd**	**239**
1988	BMW M Team Zakspeed	BMW M3 Evo																	WUN; 1; 8	WUN; 2; 7	SAL; 1 C	SAL; 2 C	HUN; 1; 4	HUN; 2; 4	HOC; 1 Ret	HOC; 2; 15	**3rd**	**239**
1989	Opel Team Irmscher	Opel Kadett GSi 16V	ZOL; 1; 18	ZOL; 2 DNS	HOC; 1; 30	HOC; 2 Ret	NÜR; 1; 12	NÜR; 2; 12	MFA; 1; 24	MFA; 2 DNS	AVU; 1; 9	AVU; 2; 8	NÜR; 1; 10	NÜR; 2; 11	NOR; 1 DNS	NOR; 2 DNS	HOC; 1 Ret	HOC; 2 DNS	DIE; 1; 21	DIE; 2; 11	NÜR; 1; 14	NÜR; 2; 11	HOC; 1; 14	HOC; 2 Ret			19th	79
1990	Opel Team Irmscher	Opel Omega 3000 24V	ZOL; 1 WD	ZOL; 2 WD	HOC; 1	HOC; 2	NÜR; 1	NÜR; 2	AVU; 1; 3	AVU; 2; 9	MFA; 1 Ret	MFA; 2 Ret	WUN; 1 Ret	WUN; 2 Ret	NÜR; 1	NÜR; 2	NOR; 1	NOR; 2	DIE; 1; 15	DIE; 2; 10	NÜR; 1; 17	NÜR; 2 Ret	HOC; 1; 17	HOC; 2 Ret			31st	1
1991	BMW Team Isert	BMW M3 Sport Evo	ZOL; 1	ZOL; 2	HOC; 1	HOC; 2	NÜR; 1	NÜR; 2	AVU; 1	AVU; 2	WUN; 1	WUN; 2	NOR; 1; 19	NOR; 2; 14	DIE; 1	DIE; 2	NÜR; 1	NÜR; 2	ALE; 1	ALE; 2	HOC; 1	HOC; 2	BRN; 1	BRN; 2	DON; 1	DON; 2	NC	0
1993	Persson Motorsport	Mercedes 190E 2.5-16 Evo II	ZOL; 1	ZOL; 2	HOC; 1	HOC; 2	NÜR; 1	NÜR; 2	WUN; 1	WUN; 2	NÜR; 1	NÜR; 2	NOR; 1	NOR; 2	DON; 1	DON; 2	DIE; 1	DIE; 2	ALE; 1; 8	ALE; 2; 10	AVU; 1	AVU; 2	HOC; 1	HOC; 2			17th	4

=== Complete European Touring Car Championship results ===
(key) (Races in bold indicate pole position) (Races in italics indicate fastest lap)

Year	Team	Car	1	2	3	4	5	6	7	8	9	10	11	12	13	14	DC	Pts
1985	(West Germany) **Linder Rennsport**	BMW 323i	MNZ	VAL	DON	AND	BRN	ZEL; 5†	SAL						EST; 15	JAR; 9†	NC	0
1985	(West Germany) **Schnitzer Motorsport**	BMW 635 CSi								NÜR; 6†	SPA; 2†	SIL	NOG	ZOL; 5†			NC	0
1986	(West Germany) **Linder Rennsport**	BMW 325i	MNZ; 4	DON; 6	HOC; Ret	MIS; 5	AND	BRN	ZEL	NÜR	SPA; 5	SIL; 8	NOG; 10	ZOL; 6	JAR; Ret	EST; 11	5th	161
1987	(West Germany) **Linder Rennsport**	BMW M3	DON; 2	EST; Ret	**AND**; Ret	ZOL; 4	ZEL; 3	IMO; 16	NOG; 2								7th	139
1988	(West Germany) **Schnitzer Motorsport**	BMW M3	MNZ	DON	EST	JAR; 3	DIJ	VAL									35th	65
1988	(West Germany) **Schnitzer Motorsport**	BMW M3 Evo							NÜR; Ret	SPA; 9	ZOL	SIL; 10	NOG				35th	65

† Not eligible for points.

=== Complete World Touring Car Championship results ===
(key) (Races in bold indicate pole position) (Races in italics indicate fastest lap)

Year	Team	Car	1	2	3	4	5	6	7	8	9	10	11	DC	Pts
1987	(West Germany) **Linder Rennsport**	BMW M3	MNZ; DSQ	JAR; Ret										13th	118
1987	(Italy) **Bigazzi**	BMW M3			DIJ ovr:2 cls:1									13th	118
1987	(West Germany) **Schnitzer Motorsport**	BMW M3				NÜR ovr:3 cls:2	SPA ovr:26 cls:15	BNO; Ret	SIL; Ret	BAT; Ret	CLD ovr:3 cls:2	WEL ovr:6 cls:2	FJI ovr:4 cls:2	13th	118

=== Complete British Touring Car Championship results ===
(key) (Races in bold indicate pole position in class) (Races in italics indicate fastest lap in class)

Year	Team	Car	Class	1	2	3	4	5	6	7	8	9	10	11	12	13	DC	Pts	Class Pos
1990	Vauxhall Motorsport	Vauxhall Cavalier	B	OUL	DON	THR	SIL	OUL	SIL	BRH	SNE	BRH	BIR	DON	THR ovr:6 cls:2	SIL; Ret	24th	15	16th

=== Complete Super Tourenwagen Cup results ===
(key) (Races in bold indicate pole position) (Races in italics indicate fastest lap)

Year	Team	Car	1	2	3	4	5	6	7	8	DC	Pts
1994	Ford Wolf Racing	Ford Mondeo Ghia	AVU; 5	WUN; 5	ZOL; 9	ZAN; 5	ÖST; 9	SAL; 3	SPA; 10	NÜR; 9	5th	43

=== Complete TCR International Series results ===
(key) (Races in bold indicate pole position) (Races in italics indicate fastest lap)

Year	Team	Car	1	2	3	4	5	6	7	8	9	10	11	12	13	14	15	16	17	18	19	20	21	22	DC	Points
2015	Campos Racing	Opel Astra OPC	MYS; 1	MYS; 2	CHN; 1	CHN; 2	ESP; 1	ESP; 2	POR; 1	POR; 2	ITA; 1	ITA; 2	AUT; 1; 10	AUT; 2 Ret	RUS; 1	RUS; 2	RBR; 1	RBR; 2	SIN; 1	SIN; 2	THA; 1	THA; 2	MAC; 1	MAC; 2	45th	1
