= Klaus Niedzwiedz =

German racing driver (born 1951)

Klaus Benno Niedzwiedz (born February 24, 1951, in Dortmund, West Germany) is a former professional race driver and motoring journalist.

== Driver ==
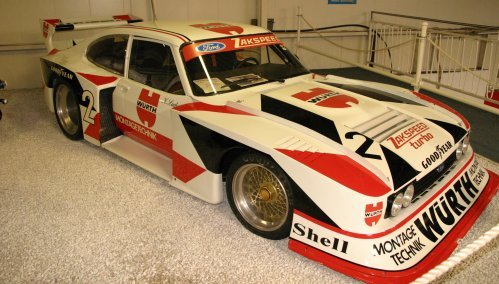
Team mate Klaus Ludwig's 1981 Group 5 Zakspeed Ford Capri at the Auto & Technik Museum in Sinsheim, Germany

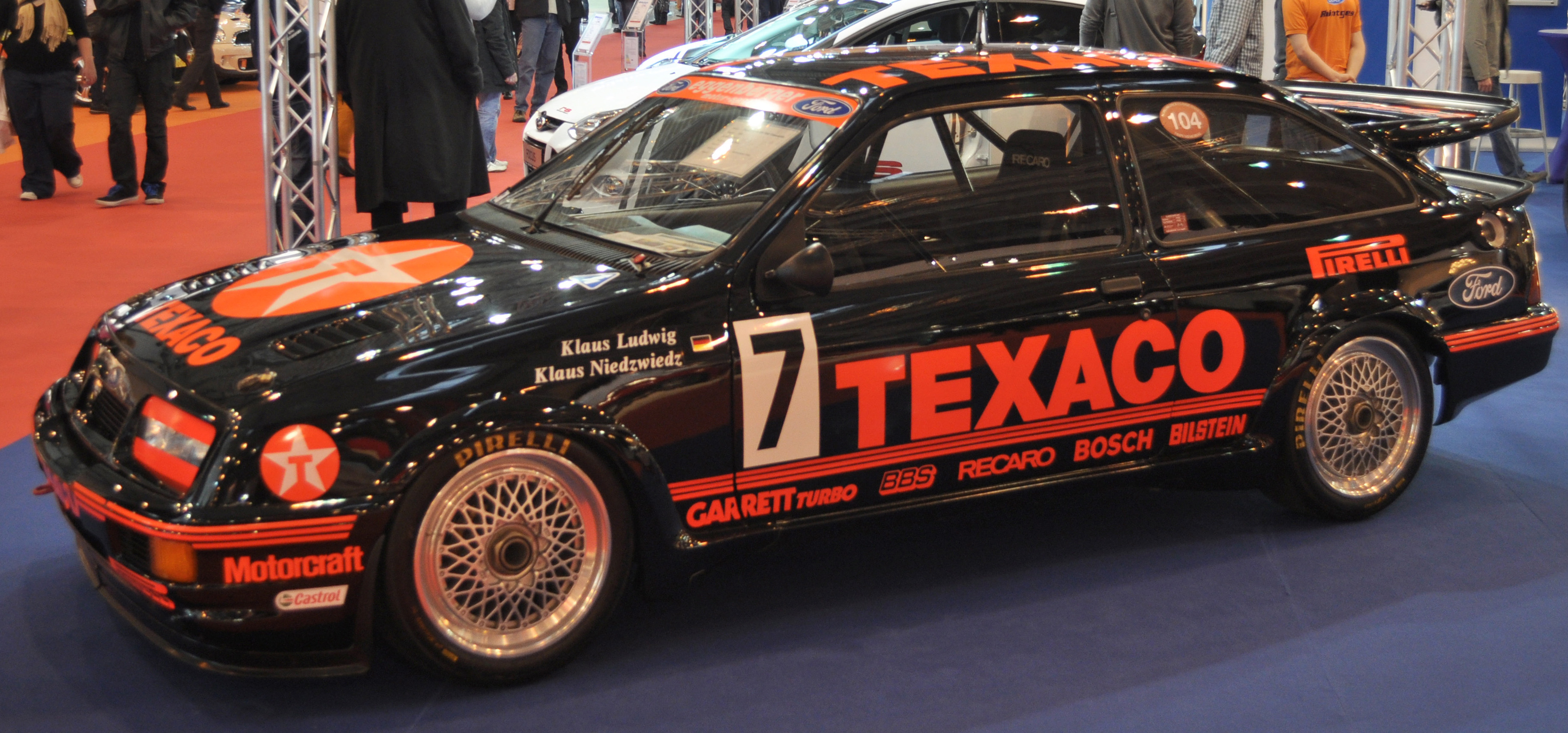
Eggenberger Motorsport Ford Sierra RS500

Niedzwiedz's greatest success came in the 1980s as a driver for Ford.

Niedzwiedz rose to prominence when driving a Ford Capri for Zakspeed in the Deutsche Rennsport Meisterschaft. The turbocharged 1.4 L engine from the Zakspeed Ford Capri was later enlarged for the 1.7 L "Super Capri". With this 500+ hp car, Niedzwiedz established in 1982 the "eternal lap record" for Group 5 touring car racing at the old 22.8 km Nürburgring with 7:08.59, just ten seconds slower than the F1 record of 6:58.60 set by Niki Lauda in 1975 (see: Nürburgring lap times).

During the 1982 season, Niedzwiedz also drove in the World Endurance Championship for Zakspeed, in a Ford C100. The Zakspeed-prepared Group C machine was run by the works Ford Germany team with Klaus Ludwig, Manfred Winkelhock and Marc Surer at the wheel, but the car was a midfielder at best, although Jonathan Palmer and Desiré Wilson scored a fourth place overall the 1,000 km of Brands Hatch in 1982. Ford Germany retracted their support and one car was sold to privateers, while the other chassis was evolved by Zakspeed into the C1/4 and the C1/8, making few appearances in international racing, but becoming a front-runner in the German Interserie, where it won the European championship in 1984 with Niedzwiedz.

In 1982 and 1987, Niedzwiedz was the winner at the 24 Hours Nürburgring, in both events with Klaus Ludwig. Driving an Eggenberger Motorsport Ford Sierra he was runner-up in the World Touring Car Championship of 1987 and the Deutsche Tourenwagen Meisterschaft of 1989.

Between 1987 and 1996, Niedzwiedz drove six times in the Bathurst 1000. After driving for Eggenberger Motorsport in 1987, he drove Eggenberger built Sierra RS500s for Allan Moffat Racing in 1988, 1989, 1990 and 1992. He returned one last time in 1996 to drive a Ford Falcon EB, again for Allan Moffat.

Niedzwiedz also drove for Allan Moffat Racing at the 1989 Fuji 500 and 1990 Sandown 500.

In 1998, Niedzwiedz won the privateer title in the ADAC German Supertouring car championship (Super Tourenwagen Cup) with an Opel Vectra.

In 2003, Niedzwiedz won a VLN race with Porsche 911 GT3 at the Nürburgring.

Other events:

- 1981 24 Hours of Le Mans
- 1982 24 Hours of Le Mans
- 1988 24 Hours of Le Mans

== Journalist ==
Since 1984, Niedzwiedz has worked as a journalist and television host in Germany, starting with moderation of Sat.1 magazine Treibstoff. Since 1997, he moderates n-tv Motor.

== Tamiya Model ==
A 1/24 scale model of the 1979 Ford Capri Zakspeed (model 24014) is represented as the D&W Klaus Niedzwiedz car, and is complete with Niedzwiedz in team uniform.

== Racing record ==
=== Career summary ===
Season	Series	Team	Races	Wins	Poles	F/Laps	Podiums	Points	Position
1977	Challenge de Formule Renault Europe		?	?	?	?	?	0	NC
1978	FIA European Formula 3 Championship	Team Eufra Europe Formel Racing	1	0	0	0	0	0	NC
1979	Deutsche Rennsport Meisterschaft	Zakspeed	1	0	0	0	0	10	23rd
1979	European Touring Car Championship	Zakspeed	12	?	?	?	?	65	12th
1979	World Sportscar Championship	Zakspeed	1	0	0	0	0	0	(Note: No drivers' Championship.)
1980	Deutsche Rennsport Meisterschaft	Zakspeed	13	2	1	0	7	129	5th
1981	Deutsche Rennsport Meisterschaft	Zakspeed	13	1	0	1	5	88	9th
1981	World Sportscar Championship	Liqui Moly Zakspeed	1	0	0	0	0	0	NC
1981	World Sportscar Championship	Joest Racing	1	0	0	0	0	0	NC
1982	Deutsche Rennsport Meisterschaft	Zakspeed	10	2	1	1	6	106	**3rd**
1982	World Sportscar Championship	Ford Motor Company	3	0	0	0	0	0	NC
1982	Interserie	Zakspeed	2	0	1	0	1	15	16th
1983	Deutsche Rennsport Meisterschaft	Zakspeed	6	1	0	0	3	52	**3rd**
1983	World Sportscar Championship	Jägermeister Ford Zakspeed Team	1	0	0	0	0	0	NC
1983	Interserie	Zakspeed	2	0	0	1	1	0	NC
1984	Deutsche Rennsport Meisterschaft		?	?	?	?	?	21	12th
1984	World Sportscar Championship	GWB Ford Zakspeed Team	1	0	0	0	0	0	NC
1984	Interserie	GWB Ford Zakspeed Team	6	4	3	4	5	95	**1st**
1985	Deutschen Produktionswagen Meisterschaft	Ford Rennsport HWRT	4	1	0	1	2	29	18th
1985	World Sportscar Championship	John Fitzpatrick Racing	1	0	0	0	0	0	NC
1985	World Sportscar Championship	Porsche Kremer Racing	1	0	0	0	0	0	NC
1985	British Saloon Car Championship	Radiopaging	1	0	0	0	1	4	26th
1986	Deutsche Tourenwagen Meisterschaft	Ford Rennsport HWRT	9	1	4	2	2	83	6th
1986	World Sportscar Championship	Porsche Kremer Racing	1	0	0	0	0	28	17th
1986	World Sportscar Championship	Richard Lloyd Racing	3	0	0	1	1	28	17th
1987	World Touring Car Championship	Eggenberger Motorsport	10	4	7	4	5	268	**2nd**
1987	European Touring Car Championship	Eggenberger Motorsport	2	1	0	0	2	0	NC
1987	Deutsche Tourenwagen Meisterschaft	Wolf Racing	1	0	0	0	0	0	NC
1988	Deutsche Tourenwagen Meisterschaft	Ringshausen ABR Motorsport	14	0	0	2	3	115	17th
1988	European Touring Car Championship	Eggenberger Motorsport	9	3	4	3	6	204	8th
1988	Asia-Pacific Touring Car Championship	Allan Moffat Enterprises	1	0	0	0	0	0	NC
1988	Asia-Pacific Touring Car Championship	Trampio Object-T	1	1	0	0	1	0	NC
1989	Deutsche Tourenwagen Meisterschaft	Ford Motorsport Eggenberger	22	4	2	2	9	274	**2nd**
1990	Deutsche Tourenwagen Meisterschaft	Opel Team Irmscher	18	0	0	0	0	10	22nd
1990	Japanese Touring Car Championship	Allan Moffat Enterprises	1	0	0	0	1	24	40th
1990	Australian Endurance Championship	Allan Moffat Enterprises	2	0	1	0	0	1	41st
1991	Deutsche Tourenwagen Meisterschaft	Opel Team Eggenberger	24	0	0	0	0	0	NC
1993	ADAC GT Cup	Wolf Racing	8	0	0	0	0	12	12th
1994	ADAC GT Cup	Mamerow	8	0	0	0	4	90	**3rd**
1995	Super Tourenwagen Cup	Honda Team Linder	16	0	0	0	1	145	13th
1995	FIA Touring Car World Cup	Honda Team Linder	2	0	0	0	0	22	7th
1996	Super Tourenwagen Cup	Honda Team Linder	16	0	0	0	1	269	8th
1997	Super Tourenwagen Cup	AUGROS MIG Austria	20	0	0	0	0	103	21st
1998	Super Tourenwagen Cup	Auto Dienst Bemani Team	20	0	0	0	0	156	17th
2002	24 Hours of Nürburgring - N3		1	1	?	?	1	N/A	**1st**
2005	24 Hours of Nürburgring - A6	Sport Auto	1	1	?	?	1	N/A	**1st**
2006	SEAT León Supercopa	VIP SEAT Deutschland	2	0	0	0	0	0	NC
2006	24 Hours of Nürburgring - SP6	Sport Auto	1	0	?	?	0	N/A	7th
2008	24 Hours of Nürburgring - SP Cup	Daniela Schmid	1	0	0	0	0	N/A	?
2009	24 Hours of Nürburgring - AT	Volkswagen Motorsport	1	1	?	?	1	N/A	**1st**
2010	Volkswagen Scirocco R-Cup	N/A	1	0	0	0	0	0	NC†
2010	24 Hours of Nürburgring - AT	Volkswagen Motorsport	1	1	0	0	1	N/A	**1st**
2011	Volkswagen Scirocco R-Cup	N/A	1	0	0	0	0	0	NC†
2011	24 Hours of Nürburgring - AT	Volkswagen Motorsport	1	1	?	?	1	N/A	**1st**
2012	Volkswagen Scirocco R-Cup	N/A	2	0	0	0	0	0	NC†
2013	Volkswagen Scirocco R-Cup	N/A	2	0	0	0	0	0	NC†
2014	24 Hours of Nürburgring - SP3T	mathilda racing - Team pistenkids	1	0	?	?	0	N/A	DNF
2016	24 Hours of Nürburgring - TCR	mathilda racing - Team pistenkids	1	0	?	?	0	N/A	DNF

† As Niedzwiedz was a guest driver, he was ineligible to score points.

Footnotes

=== Complete World Sportscar Championship results ===
(key) (Races in bold indicate pole position) (Races in italics indicate fastest lap)

Year	Entrant	Class	Chassis	Engine	1	2	3	4	5	6	7	8	9	10	11	12	13	14	15	Pos.	Pts
1979	Zakspeed Racing	Gr.5	Ford Capri Turbo	Ford 1.4 L4t	DAY	MUG	DIJ	SIL	NÜR; Ret	PER	GLN	BRH	VAL							(Note: No drivers' Championship.)	
1981	Liqui Moly Zakspeed	Gr.5	Ford Capri Turbo	Ford 1.7 L4t	DAY	SEB	MUG	MNZ	RSD	SIL	NÜR; DNS									NC	0
1981	Joest Racing	S +2.0	Porsche 908/80	Porsche 911/78 2.1 F6t								LMS; Ret	PER	DAY	GLN	SPA	MOS	ROA	BRH	NC	0
1982	Ford Motor Company	C	Ford C100	Cosworth DFL 4.0 V8	MNZ	SIL	NÜR	LMS; Ret	SPA; 18	MUG	FUJ	BRH; Ret								NC	0
1983	Jägermeister Ford Zakspeed Team	C	Zakspeed C1	Ford 1.8 L4t	MNZ	SIL	NÜR	LMS	SPA; Ret	FUJ	KYA									NC	0
1984	GWB Ford Zakspeed Team	C1	Zakspeed C1	Cosworth DFL 3.3 V8	MNZ	SIL	LMS	NÜR; Ret	BRH	MOS	SPA	IMO	FUJ	KYA	SAN					NC	0
1985	John Fitzpatrick Racing	C1	Porsche 956	Porsche Type 935/76 2.6 F6t	MUG	MNZ; 11	SIL	LMS												NC	0
1985	Porsche Kremer Racing	C1	Porsche 956	Porsche Type 935/76 2.6 F6t					HOC; Ret	MOS	SPA	BRH	FUJ	SHA						NC	0
1986	Porsche Kremer Racing	C1	Porsche 962C	Porsche Type 935/76 2.6 F6t	MNZ; 8															17th	28
1986	Richard Lloyd Racing	C1	Porsche 956 GTi	Porsche Type 935/76 2.6 F6t		SIL; 4	LMS	NOR	BRH	JER										17th	28
1986	Richard Lloyd Racing	C1	Porsche 956 GTi	Porsche Type 935/79 2.8 F6t							NÜR; 2	SPA	FUJ; Ret							17th	28
1988	Team Sauber Mercedes	C1	Sauber C9	Mercedes-Benz M117 5.0 V8t	JER	JAR	MNZ	SIL	LMS; DNS	BRN	BRH	NÜR	SPA	FUJ	SAN					NC	0

Footnotes

=== Complete 24 Hours of Le Mans results ===
Year	Team	Co-Drivers	Car	Class	Laps	Pos.	Class Pos.
1981	(West Germany) Joest Racing	(West Germany) Reinhold Joest (United States) Dale Whittington	Porsche 908/80	S +2.0	80	DNF	DNF
1982	(West Germany) Ford Germany	(West Germany) Manfred Winkelhock	Ford C100	C	71	DNF	DNF
1988	(Switzerland) Team Sauber Mercedes	(United Kingdom) Kenny Acheson	Sauber C9-Mercedes	C1	-	DNS	DNS

=== Complete Deutsche Tourenwagen Meisterschaft results ===
(key) (Races in bold indicate pole position) (Races in italics indicate fastest lap)

Year	Team	Car	1	2	3	4	5	6	7	8	9	10	11	12	13	14	15	16	17	18	19	20	21	22	23	24	Pos.	Pts
1985	Ford Rennsport HWRT	Ford Sierra XR4 TI	ZOL	WUN	AVU; 1	MFA; Ret	ERD; 2	ERD; Ret	DIE	DIE	ZOL	SIE	NÜR														18th	29
1986	Ford Rennsport HWRT	Ford Sierra XR4 TI	ZOL; 6	HOC; 3	NÜR; 4	**AVU**; Ret	MFA; 1	**WUN**; Ret	**NÜR**; 10	ZOL; 9	**NÜR**; Ret																6th	83
1987	Wolf Racing	Ford Sierra XR4 TI	HOC	ZOL	NÜR	AVU	MFA	NOR	NÜR; Ret	WUN	DIE	SAL															NC	0
1988	Ringshausen ABR Motorsport	Ford Sierra RS 500 Cosworth	ZOL; 1; 11	ZOL; 2; 2	HOC; 1; 6	HOC; 2; 6	NÜR; 1 Ret	NÜR; 2 Ret	BRN; 1; 11	BRN; 2; 7	AVU; 1	AVU; 2	MFA; 1	MFA; 2	NÜR; 1 Ret	NÜR; 2 DNS	NOR; 1	NOR; 2	WUN; 1	WUN; 2	SAL; 1 C	SAL; 2 C	HUN; 1; 3	HUN; 2; 2	HOC; 1; 10	HOC; 2 Ret	17th	115
1989	Ford Motorsport Eggenberger	Ford Sierra RS 500 Cosworth	ZOL; 1; 6	ZOL; 2; 3	HOC; 1; 11	HOC; 2; 3	NÜR; 1; 9	NÜR; 2; 5	MFA; 1; 7	MFA; 2; 5	AVU; 1; 23	AVU; 2; 1	NÜR; 1; 7	NÜR; 2; 4	**NOR**; **1**; 2	NOR; 2; 2	HOC; 1; 3	HOC; 2; 1	DIE; 1; 9	DIE; 2; 16	NÜR; 1; 10	NÜR; 2; 9	**HOC**; **1**; 1	HOC; 2; 1			2nd	274
1990	Opel Team Irmscher	Opel Omega 3000 24v	ZOL; 1 WD	ZOL; 2 WD	HOC; 1	HOC; 2	NÜR; 1	NÜR; 2	AVU; 1; 25	AVU; 2 Ret	MFA; 1 Ret	MFA; 2 Ret	WUN; 1; 21	WUN; 2; 12	NÜR; 1; 9	NÜR; 2; 5	NOR; 1 Ret	NOR; 2 Ret	DIE; 1 Ret	DIE; 2 DNS	NÜR; 1; 18	NÜR; 2; 16	HOC; 1; 28	HOC; 2 DNS			22nd	10
1991	Opel Team Eggenberger	Opel Omega 3000 Evo 500	ZOL; 1 Ret	ZOL; 2 DNS	HOC; 1; 24	HOC; 2; 19	NÜR; 1 Ret	NÜR; 2; 21	AVU; 1; 28	AVU; 2; 17	WUN; 1 Ret	WUN; 2 Ret	NOR; 1 Ret	NOR; 2 DNS	DIE; 1; 25	DIE; 2; 20	NÜR; 1 Ret	NÜR; 2 DNS	ALE; 1 Ret	ALE; 2 DNS	HOC; 1; 17	HOC; 2; 24	BRN; 1 Ret	BRN; 2 DNS	DON; 1; 17	DON; 2 Ret	NC	0

=== Complete British Saloon Car Championship results ===
(key) (Races in bold indicate pole position; races in italics indicate fastest lap.)

Year	Team	Car	Class	1	2	3	4	5	6	7	8	9	10	11	12	DC	Pts	Class
1985	Industrial Control Services Ltd.	Ford Sierra XR4Ti	A	SIL	OUL	THR	DON	THR	SIL	DON	SIL ovr:3 cls:3	SNE	BRH	BRH	SIL	26th	4	10th

=== Complete World Touring Car Championship results ===
(key) (Races in bold indicate pole position) (Races in italics indicate fastest lap)

Year	Team	Car	1	2	3	4	5	6	7	8	9	10	11	Pos.	Pts
1987	Eggenberger Motorsport	Ford Sierra RS Cosworth	MNZ; DSQ	**JAR**; 5	DIJ; 3	NÜR; 1	**SPA**; Ret							2nd	268
1987	Eggenberger Motorsport	Ford Sierra RS500						**BRN**; 1	SIL; 6	**BAT**; DSQ	**CLD**; 12	**WEL**; 1	**FUJ**; 1	2nd	268

=== Complete Bathurst 1000 results ===
Year	Team	Co-Drivers	Car	Class	Laps	Pos.	Class Pos.
1987	(Switzerland) Eggenberger Motorsport	(West Germany) Klaus Ludwig	Ford Sierra RS500	1	159	DSQ	DSQ
1987	(Switzerland) Eggenberger Motorsport	(West Germany) Klaus Ludwig	Ford Sierra RS500	1	-	DNS	DNS
1988	(Australia) Allan Moffat Enterprises	(Canada) Allan Moffat (Australia) Gregg Hansford	Ford Sierra RS500	A	129	DNF	DNF
1989	(Australia) Allan Moffat Enterprises	(West Germany) Frank Biela	Ford Sierra RS500	A	161	**2nd**	**2nd**
1990	(Australia) Allan Moffat Enterprises	(West Germany) Frank Biela (Belgium) Pierre Dieudonné	Ford Sierra RS500	1	151	10th	10th
1990	(Australia) Allan Moffat Enterprises	(Australia) Gregg Hansford (Belgium) Pierre Dieudonné	Ford Sierra RS500	1	138	DNF	DNF
1992	(Australia) Allan Moffat Enterprises	(Australia) Gregg Hansford	Ford Sierra RS500	A	128	19th	17th
1996	(Australia) Allan Moffat Enterprises	(Australia) Ken Douglas	Ford EB Falcon		157	10th	10th

=== Complete Super Tourenwagen Cup results ===
(key) (Races in bold indicate pole position) (Races in italics indicate fastest lap)

Year	Team	Car	1	2	3	4	5	6	7	8	9	10	11	12	13	14	15	16	17	18	19	20	Pos.	Pts
1995	Honda Team Linder	Honda Accord	ZOL; 1; 24†	ZOL; 2; 20†	SPA; 1 DSQ	SPA; 2; 10	ÖST; 1; 3	ÖST; 2; 18†	HOC; 1 Ret	HOC; 2; 13	NÜR; 1; 9	NÜR; 2; 10	SAL; 1; 8	SAL; 2; 4	AVU; 1 Ret	AVU; 2 Ret	NÜR; 1; 22	NÜR; 2 Ret					13th	145
1996	Honda Team Linder	Honda Accord	ZOL; 1; 9	ZOL; 2; 5	ASS; 1; 10	ASS; 2; 6	HOC; 1 Ret	HOC; 2 DNS	SAC; 1	SAC; 2	WUN; 1; 8	WUN; 2; 12	ZWE; 1; 15	ZWE; 2; 9	SAL; 1; 5	SAL; 2; 5	AVU; 1; 2	AVU; 2; 4	NÜR; 1; 4	NÜR; 2 Ret			8th	269
1997	AUGROS MIG Austria	Audi A4 Quattro	HOC; 1; 24	HOC; 2; 20	ZOL; 1; 20	ZOL; 2; 20	NÜR; 1; 18	NÜR; 2 DNS	SAC; 1 Ret	SAC; 2; 12	NOR; 1; 14	NOR; 2; 9	WUN; 1; 12	WUN; 2 Ret	ZWE; 1; 12	ZWE; 2; 8	SAL; 1; 22	SAL; 2; 20	REG; 1 Ret	REG; 2; 14	NÜR; 1; 21	NÜR; 2; 15	21st	103
1998	Auto Dienst Bemani Team	Opel Vectra	HOC; 1; 17	HOC; 2; 14	NÜR; 1; 16	NÜR; 2; 15	SAC; 1; 18	SAC; 2; 15	NOR; 1; 11	NOR; 2 Ret	REG; 1; 15	REG; 2; 12	WUN; 1; 13	WUN; 2; 13	ZWE; 1; 16	ZWE; 2; 16	SAL; 1; 18	SAL; 2; 14	OSC; 1; 21	OSC; 2; 16	NÜR; 1; 15	NÜR; 2 Ret	17th	156
