= BMW M Motorsport =

Division of BMW

BMW M Motorsport (formerly BMW Motorsport) is the division of BMW responsible for motorsport-related activities, including works-run competition programmes in touring car racing, sports car racing, motorcycle racing.

The current organisation is a result of a restructure in April 2021, bringing together the BMW M high-performance division with the competitive motorsport division.

Key personnel include Franciscus van Meel, CEO of BMW M GmbH, and Andreas Roos, Head of BMW M Motorsport.

== Teams ==
=== GTP/Hypercar (Endurance sportscar) ===
BMW M Team WRT

- IMSA SportsCar Championship & FIA World Endurance Championship

=== GT racing (sportscar) ===
==== GT3 ====
Ceccato Racing:

- Italian GT Championship

Century Motorsport:

- GT World Challenge Europe, British GT Championship

FK Performance Motorsport:

- ADAC GT Masters

Paradine Competition:

- GT World Challenge Europe

Paul Miller Racing

- IMSA SportsCar Championship

ROWE Racing

- GT World Challenge Europe, Nürburgring 24 Hours, Nürburgring Langstrecken-Serie

Schubert Motorsport:

- Deutsche Tourenwagen Masters, Nürburgring 24 Hours

ST Racing:

- GT World Challenge America

Team KRC

- GT World Challenge Asia

Team Studie:

- GT World Challenge Asia

Team WRT:

- FIA World Endurance Championship, Intercontinental GT Challenge, GT World Challenge Europe

Turner Motorsport:

- IMSA SportsCar Championship, GT World Challenge America

==== GT4 ====
- Auto Technic Racing
- Bimmerworld Racing
- Borusan Otomotiv Motorsport
- Century Motorsport
- Giti Tire Motorsport By WS Racing
- Fast Track Racing
- FK Performance Motorsport
- Hofor Racing by Bonk Motorsport
- Inspire Racing
- JJ Motorsport
- Random Vandals Racing
- Rooster Hall Racing
- Schubert Motorsport
- Stephen Cameron Racing
- Team Avia Sorg Rennsport
- Turner Motorsport
- W&D Racing Team

=== DTM ===
- Team RMG - also responsible for M's test and development efforts in GT.

See Deutsche Tourenwagen Masters for BMW's historical involvement in DTM.

From 2021 onwards the DTM series ran GT3 cars

For 2023, announcements are on hold pending reorganisation of the DTM series under new ownership.

== Racecars ==
=== Current ===
- BMW M235i Racing
- BMW M240i Racing
- BMW M2 CS Racing
- BMW M4 GT3
- BMW M4 GT4
- BMW M4 GT4 Concept
- BMW M Hybrid V8

== Factory drivers ==
=== 2026 factory drivers ===
- (United States) Bill Auberlen
- (United States) Connor De Phillippi
- (United Kingdom) Jake Dennis
- (Belgium) Ugo de Wilde
- (Brazil) Augusto Farfus
- (United States) Robby Foley
- (Netherlands) Robin Frijns
- (United Kingdom) Dan Harper
- (Germany) Max Hesse
- (Germany) Jens Klingmann
- (Denmark) Kevin Magnussen
- (Switzerland) Raffaele Marciello
- (South Africa) Jordan Pepper
- (Germany) René Rast
- (Italy) Valentino Rossi
- (Germany) Tim Tramnitz
- (South Africa) Kelvin van der Linde
- (South Africa) Sheldon van der Linde
- (Belgium) Dries Vanthoor
- (United States) Neil Verhagen
- (Belgium) Charles Weerts
- (Germany) Marco Wittmann

==== Notable former factory drivers ====
- (United Kingdom) Tom Blomqvist
- (Netherlands) Nicky Catsburg
- (Netherlands) Stef Dusseldorp
- (United States) John Edwards
- (Austria) Philipp Eng
- (Sweden) Joel Eriksson
- (Portugal) Antonio Felix da Costa
- (Germany) Timo Glock
- (United States) Colton Herta
- (Sweden) Erik Johansson
- (Denmark) Mikkel Jensen
- (Finland) Jesse Krohn
- (Belgium) Maxime Martin
- (Australia) Chaz Mostert
- (Finland) Markus Palttala
- (United Kingdom) David Pittard
- (United Kingdom) Alexander Sims
- (United States) Madison Snow
- (Canada) Bruno Spengler
- (United Kingdom) Nick Yelloly

== See also ==
- BMW M
- BMW in motorsport
- BMW Sauber
- Alpina
- Dinan BMW
- BMW Motorrad
