= Eggenberger Motorsport =

(Switzerland) Eggenberger Motorsport
- Team principal(s): Rüdi Eggenberger
- Former series: European Touring Car Championship; World Touring Car Championship
- Noted drivers: Enzo Calderari (1982); Umberto Grano (1982); Helmut Kelleners (1982); Marco Vanoli (1982); G Brancatelli (1985, 88, 89); Thomas Lindström (1985, 89); Klaus Niedzwiedz (1986-88); Steve Soper (1986-88); Pierre Dieudonné (1987-88); Klaus Ludwig (1987-88); Thierry Boutsen (1987-88); Frank Biela (1988-89); Bertrand Gachot (1988); Armin Hahne (1988); Bernd Schneider (1988-89); Didier Theys (1988); Win Percy (1989); Bruno Eichmann (1994); Thierry Boutsen (1994) Roland Asch (1995); Johnny Hauser (1995)
- Drivers' Championships: 2

Eggenberger Motorsport was a Swiss motor racing team that competed in the European Touring Car Championship in the 1980s.

== History ==
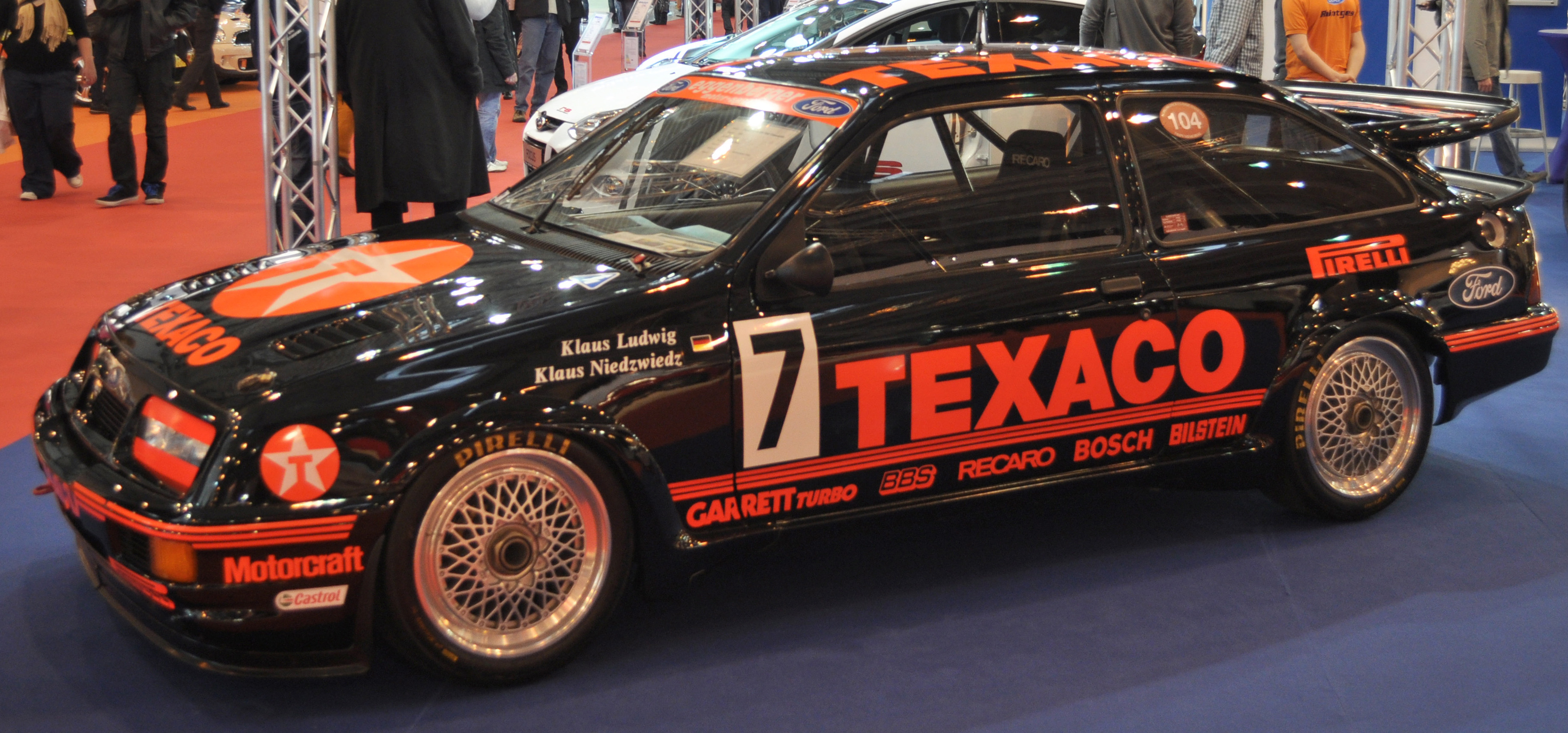
Ford Sierra RS500 of Klaus Ludwig and Klaus Niedzwiedz

In 1982, Eggenberger Motorsport won the 1982 European Touring Car Championship (ETCC) with Umberto Grano and Helmut Kelleners driving a BMW 528i. It contested the 1983 and 1984 ETCCs with a BMW 635CSi. In 1985, Eggenberger Motorsport became the factory Volvo team, winning the series with Gianfranco Brancatelli and Thomas Lindström driving a Volvo 240.

In 1986, Eggenberger Motorsport became the Ford factory team racing the Ford Sierra XR4Ti. In 1987, the team contested the World Touring Car Championship with Ford Sierra RS500s. The team were crowned entrants' champions, although Klaus Ludwig and Klaus Niedzwiedz missed the drivers' title by one point, having been disqualified from the Bathurst 1000. In 1988, the team returned to the ETCC. In 1989, the team won the Spa 24 Hours with Gianfranco Brancatelli, Bernd Schneider and Win Percy.

Eggenberger Motorsport built two RS500s for Allan Moffat Racing in 1988/89, and Ruedi Eggenberger along with Klaus Niedzwiedz joined the team for the Bathurst 1000 in 1988, 1989, 1990 and 1992. Eggenberger drivers Pierre Dieudonné and Frank Biela each drove for Moffat on two occasions, Gianfranco Brancatelli drove for Moffat in 1991.

In 1994, Eggenberger Motorsport entered a pair of Ford Mondeos for Bruno Eichmann and Thierry Boutsen in the Super Tourenwagen Cup. In 1995 the cars were driven by Roland Asch and Johnny Hauser.

In February 2018, Founder/Principal Rüdi Eggenberger died two days after his 79th birthday, following a short illness.
