= 1987 Bob Jane T-Marts 500 =

(Australia) 1987 Bob Jane T-Marts 500
Race details
- Round 9 of 11 in the 1987 World Touring Car Championship at Calder Park Raceway in Melbourne, Australia.
- Date: 11 October, 1987
- Location: Melbourne, Australia
- Course: Calder Park Raceway; 4.216 kilometres (2.620 mi)
- Laps: 120
Pole position
Driver		(Germany) Klaus Ludwig	Eggenberger Motorsport
Time		1.42.92	
Podium
First		(United Kingdom) Steve Soper (Belgium) Pierre Dieudonné	Eggenberger Motorsport
Second		(Italy) Emanuele Pirro (Italy) Roberto Ravaglia	BMW Motorsport
Third		(Germany) Markus Oestreich (Austria) Roland Ratzenberger	BMW Motorsport
Fastest Lap
Driver		(Australia) Andrew Miedecke	Oxo Supercube Motorsport
Time		1:45.03	

The 1987 Bob Jane T-Marts 500 was the ninth round of the 1987 World Touring Car Championship. The race, which was open to Group A Touring Cars, was held on 11 October 1987 at Calder Park Raceway in outer Melbourne, Victoria, Australia on the rarely used combined circuit which incorporated both the recently redeveloped (1986) road course and the newly completed, high banked (24°) NASCAR-style “Thunderdome” oval.

The combined oval/road course was 4.216 km (2.620 mi) long and the race was run over 120 laps.

The race was won by Steve Soper and Pierre Dieudonné driving a Ford Sierra RS500 for the Ford Texaco Racing Team. Both Klaus Ludwig's pole time of 1:42.92 and Andrew Miedecke's fastest race lap of 1:45.03 in their respective Ford Sierra RS500's were faster than the pole time set in the only other Group A Touring Car race held on the combined oval/road course, the Yokohama/Bob Jane T-Marts 300 held two months previously on 9 August.

== Classes ==
Cars competed in three classes based on engine capacity.

- Class A: Over 2500cc
- Class B: 1601-2500cc
- Class C: Up to 1600cc

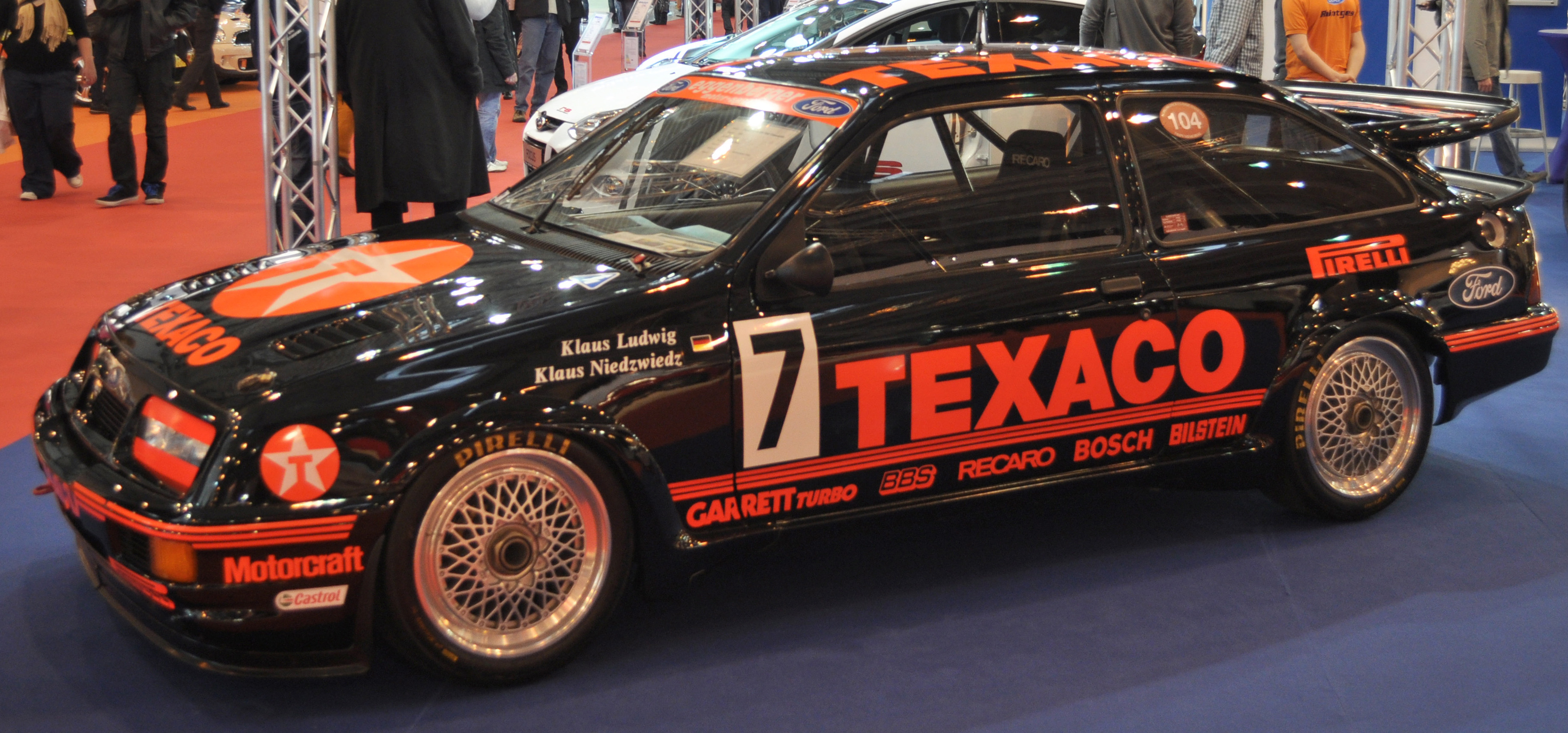
Klaus Ludwig and Klaus Niedzwiedz placed 12th driving a Ford Sierra RS500

== Results ==
Pos	Class	No.	Entrant	Drivers	Car	Laps	Qual Pos	Series Points
1	A	6	(Switzerland) Ford Texaco Racing Team	(United Kingdom) Steve Soper (Belgium) Pierre Dieudonné	Ford Sierra RS500	120	2	40
2	B	46	(West Germany) BMW Motorsport / Schnitzer Team	(Italy) Emanuele Pirro (Italy) Roberto Ravaglia	BMW M3	120	9	35
3	B	40	(West Germany) BMW Motorsport / Schnitzer Team	(West Germany) Markus Oestreich (Austria) Roland Ratzenberger	BMW M3	120	16	27
4	B	42	(Italy) BMW Motorsport / CiBiEmm	(Venezuela) Johnny Cecotto (Italy) Gianfranco Brancatelli	BMW M3	119	7	22
5	A	15	(Australia) Peter Jackson Nissan Racing	(Australia) Glenn Seton (Australia) George Fury	Nissan Skyline RS DR30	119	11	
6	A	11	(Australia) Perkins Engineering	(Australia) Larry Perkins (New Zealand) Denny Hulme	Holden VL Commodore SS Group A	118	6	
7	B	47	(West Germany) BMW Motorsport / Schnitzer Team	(West Germany) Annette Meeuvissen (Austria) Mercedes Stermitz	BMW M3	117	18	
8	A	05	(Australia) Mobil HDT Racing	(Australia) Peter Brock (Australia) David Parsons	Holden VL Commodore SS Group A	116	8	
9	A	16	(Australia) Mitsubishi Ralliart Aust.	(Australia) Gary Scott (Japan) Akihiko Nakaya	Mitsubishi Starion	115	14	
10	A	26	(Australia) Kalari Transport Services	(Australia) Tony Noske (Australia) Gary Rush	Holden VK Commodore SS Group A	114	25	
11	A	10	(Australia) Mobil HDT Racing	(Australia) Peter McLeod (Australia) Neil Crompton	Holden VL Commodore SS Group A	114	19	
12	A	7	(Switzerland) Ford Texaco Racing Team	(West Germany) Klaus Ludwig (West Germany) Klaus Niedzwiedz	Ford Sierra RS500	113	1	23
13	A	18	(Australia) Shell Ultra Hitech Racing	(Australia) Charlie O'Brien (New Zealand) Neville Crichton (Australia) Dick Johnson	Ford Sierra RS500	113	12	
14	A	23	(Australia) Jagparts Racing	(Australia) Alf Grant (Australia) Gerald Kay	Holden VK Commodore SS Group A	108	28	
15	A	22	(Australia) Lusty Engineering Pty. Ltd.	(Australia) Graham Lusty (Australia) John Lusty	Holden VL Commodore SS Group A	107	26	
16	C	100	(Italy) Alfa Romeo	(Italy) Giorgio Francia (Italy) Daniele Toffoli	Alfa Romeo 33	100	32	26
17	A	14	(Australia) Netcomm (Aust.) Racing	(Australia) Murray Carter (Australia) Denis Horley (Australia) Steve Masterton	Nissan Skyline RS DR30	94	17	
DNF	A	31	(Australia) Cullen Supa Salvage	(Australia) Warren Cullen (New Zealand) Gary Sprague (Australia) Gary Cooke	Holden VK Commodore SS Group A	104	20	
DNF	A	27	(Australia) Ray Gulson	(Australia) Ray Gulson (Australia) Graham Gulson (Australia) Bryan Thomson	BMW 635 CSi	99	29	
DNF	A	2	(Australia) Bob Jane T-Marts	(Australia) Allan Grice (United Kingdom) Win Percy	Holden VL Commodore SS Group A	81	10	
DNF	B	44	(Australia) JPS Team BMW	(New Zealand) Jim Richards (Australia) Tony Longhurst	BMW M3	73	13	
DNF	B	43	(Italy) BMW Motorsport	(West Germany) Winni Vogt (West Germany) Altfrid Heger	BMW M3	70	15	
DNF	C	91	Toyota Team Australia	(New Zealand) John Faulkner (Australia) Drew Price	Toyota Corolla GT	67	31	
DNF	A	35	(Australia) Oxo Supercube Motorsport	(Australia) Andrew Miedecke (Australia) Don Smith	Ford Sierra RS500	58	3	
DNF	A	29	(Australia) Mulvihill Racing	(Australia) Barry Jones (Australia) Ken Mathews	Holden VK Commodore SS Group A	46	27	
DNF	B	62	(West Germany) Thomas von Loewis of Menar	(West Germany) Thomas von Löwis of Menar (West Germany) Leopold von Bayern	BMW M3	44	23	
DNF	A	24	(New Zealand)	(New Zealand) Keiran Wills (New Zealand) Philip Henley	Nissan Skyline RS DR30	42	21	
DNF	A	17	(Australia) Shell Ultra Hitech Racing	(Australia) Dick Johnson (Australia) Gregg Hansford	Ford Sierra RS500	25	4	
DNF	A	9	(Australia) Allan Moffat Racing	(United Kingdom) Andy Rouse (Canada) Allan Moffat (Belgium) Thierry Tassin	Ford Sierra RS500	21	5	
DNF	A	4	(Italy) Pro Team Italia	(Italy) Marco Gunella (Italy) Nicola Tesini (Italy) Stefano Livio	Maserati Biturbo	18	30	
DNF	A	1	(Italy) Pro Team Italia	(West Germany) Armin Hahne (Australia) Kevin Bartlett	Maserati Biturbo	17	22	
DNF	A	3	(Australia) R. G. Lanyon	(Australia) Mike Freeman (Australia) Bruce Williams (Australia) Peter Fitzgerald	Holden VK Commodore SS Group A	17	24	
DNQ	A	28	(Australia) Lawrie Nelson	(Australia) Lawrie Nelson (Australia) Bryan Thomson	Ford Mustang GT	-	-	

== Statistics ==
- Pole Position – #7 Klaus Ludwig – 1.42.92
- Fastest Lap – #35 Andrew Miedecke – 1:45.03
- Average Speed – 139.916 km/h

== See also ==
1987 Australian Touring Car season

World Touring Car Championship
Previous race: 1987 Bathurst 1000	1987 season	Next race: 1987 Wellington 500
