= 1987 Jarama 4 Hours =

(Spain) 1987 Jarama 4 Hours
Race details
- Round 2 of 11 in the 1987 World Touring Car Championship at Circuito del Jarama in Madrid, Spain.
- Date: 19 April, 1987
- Location: Madrid, Spain
- Course: Circuito del Jarama; 3.404 kilometres (2.115 mi)
- Laps: 4 hours
Pole position
Driver		(Germany) Klaus Ludwig	Eggenberger Motorsport
Time		1:31.434	
Podium
First		(Italy) Roberto Ravaglia (Italy) Emanuele Pirro	BMW Motorsport
Second		(Italy) Ivan Capelli (Austria) Roland Ratzenberger	BMW Motorsport
Third		(Spain) Luis Pérez-Sala (France) Olivier Grouillard	Bigazzi
Fastest Lap
Driver		(United Kingdom) Andy Rouse	Andy Rouse Engineering
Time		1:33.710	

The 1987 Jarama 4 Hours was the second round of the inaugural World Touring Car Championship. The race was held for cars eligible for Group A touring car regulations. It was held on April 19, 1987, at the Circuit of Jarama, in Madrid, Spain.

The race was won by Emanuele Pirro and Roberto Ravaglia, driving a BMW M3.

== Class structure ==
Cars were divided into three classes based on engine capacity:

- Division 1: 1-1600cc
- Division 2: 1601-2500cc
- Division 3: Over 2500cc

== Official results ==
Results were as follows: | Entered: 29 | Started: 29 | Finished: 17

Pos	Class	No	Team	Drivers	Car	Laps	Qual Pos	Series Points
1	2	46	(Germany) BMW Motorsport	(Italy) Roberto Ravaglia (Italy) Emanuele Pirro (Austria) Roland Ratzenberger	BMW M3	150	3	40
2	2	40	(Germany) BMW Motorsport	(Italy) Ivan Capelli (Austria) Roland Ratzenberger (Italy) Roberto Ravaglia	BMW M3	150	4	30
3	2	43	(Italy) Bigazzi	(Spain) Luis Pérez-Sala (France) Olivier Grouillard	BMW M3	150	8	24
4	3	7	(Switzerland) Eggenberger Motorsport	(Germany) Klaus Ludwig (Belgium) Pierre Dieudonné	Ford Sierra RS Cosworth	149	1	30
5	3	6	(Switzerland) Eggenberger Motorsport	(United Kingdom) Steve Soper (Germany) Klaus Niedzwiedz	Ford Sierra RS Cosworth	149	2	23
6	2	41	(Germany) BMW Motorsport	(Germany) Winfried Vogt (Germany) Christian Danner	BMW M3	149	10	
7	2	48	(Italy) CiBiEmme Sport	(Italy) Luciano Lovato (Italy) Fabio Mancini	BMW M3	147	15	
8	2	42	(Italy) CiBiEmme Sport	(Venezuela) Johnny Cecotto (Italy) Gianfranco Brancatelli	BMW M3	140	6	16
9	2	49	Kulker SC Team	(Hungary) József Cserkuti (Italy) Marco Curti	BMW M3	139	23	
10	2	45	Dixi Sport	(Switzerland) Bernard Santal (France) Ferdinand de Lesseps	Alfa Romeo 75	138	24	
11	2	79	(Italy) Albatech	(Italy) Walter Voulaz (Italy) Marcello Cipriani	Alfa Romeo 75	137	19	12
12	1	102	(Germany) Seikel Motorsport	(Socialist Federal Republic of Yugoslavia) Tihomir Filipovic (Switzerland) Heinz Wirth	Audi 80	134	34	
13	2	44	Dixi Sport	(Belgium) Gerard Févrot (Belgium) Bruno di Gioia	Alfa Romeo 75	134	18	
14	3	8	(United Kingdom) Andy Rouse Engineering	(United Kingdom) Andy Rouse (Belgium) Thierry Tassin	Ford Sierra RS Cosworth	125	5	15
15	3	16	(Germany) Seikel Motorsport	(Germany) Peter Seikel (Italy) Giovanni da Schio	Ford Mustang GT	120	25	
16	2	80	(Sweden) Q-Racing	(Sweden) Thomas Lindström (Sweden) Mikael Naebrink	Alfa Romeo 75	109	16	8
17	2	75	(Italy) Alfa Corse	(France) Jacques Laffite (Italy) Alessandro Nannini	Alfa Romeo 75	108	12	5
DNF	2	76	(Italy) Alfa Corse	(Italy) Giorgio Francia (Italy) Paolo Barilla	Alfa Romeo 75	108	13	
DNF	3	5	(Australia) Allan Moffat Racing	(Canada) Allan Moffat (Australia) John Harvey	Holden VL Commodore SS Group A	78	11	
DNF	2	60	(Germany) Schnitzer Motorsport	(Germany) Annette Meeuvissen (Germany) Mercedes Stermitz	BMW M3	11	9	
DNF	2	47	(Germany) BMW Motorsport	(Germany) Markus Oestreich (Germany) Altfrid Heger	BMW M3		7	
DNF	2	77	(Italy) Brixia Corse	(Italy) Rinaldo Drovandi (Italy) Gabriele Tarquini	Alfa Romeo 75		17	
DNF	2	19	(Italy) CiBiEmme Sport	(Italy) Massimo Micangeli (Italy) Maurizio Micangeli	BMW 635 CSi		20	
DNF	2	78	(Italy) Brixia Corse	(Italy) Carlo Rossi (Italy) Alessandro Santin	Alfa Romeo 75		21	
DNF	3	31	CMS Sweden	(Sweden) Christer Simonsen (Sweden) Kurt Simonsen	Volvo 240T		22	
DNF	2	51	ÚAMK	(Czech Republic) Oldřich Vaníček (Czech Republic) Vlastimil Tomášek	BMW M3		26	
DNF	2	105		(Spain) Luis Miguel Arias (Spain) D. Arias (Spain) Santiago Cantero	VW Golf GTI		28	
DNF	1	95	(Germany) Georg Alber	(Germany) Helmut Maier (Germany) Georg Alber (Czech Republic) Antonín Charouz	Toyota Corolla GT		30	
DNF	2	18	(Italy) CiBiEmme Sport	(Switzerland) Georges Bosshard (Spain) José Ángel Sasiambarrena	BMW 635 CSi		14	

- Drivers in italics practiced in the car but did not take part in the race.

== See also ==
- 1987 World Touring Car Championship

World Touring Car Championship
Previous race: 1987 Monza 500	1987 season	Next race: 1987 Burgundy 500
