= 1987 Spa 24 Hour =

(Belgium) 1987 Spa 24 Hour
Race details
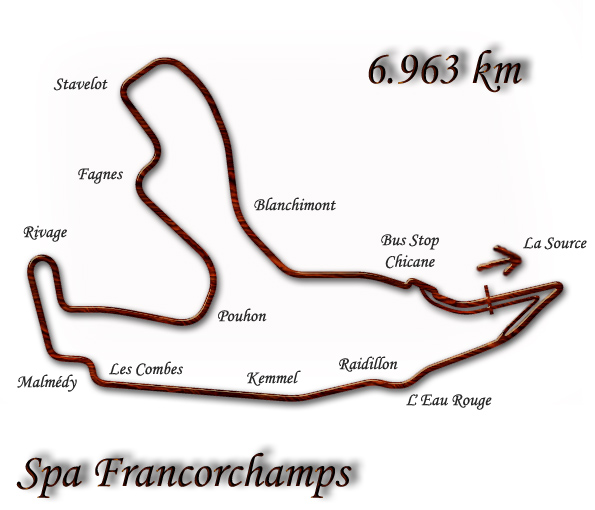
- Round 5 of 11 in the 1987 World Touring Car Championship at Circuit de Spa-Francorchamps in Francorchamps, Belgium.
- Date: 1–2 August, 1987
- Location: Francorchamps, Belgium
- Course: Circuit de Spa-Francorchamps; 6.968 kilometres (4.330 mi)
- Laps: 24 hours
Pole position
Driver		(Germany) Klaus Ludwig	Eggenberger Motorsport
Time		2:37.270	
Podium
First		(Belgium) Eric van de Poele (Belgium) Jean-Michel Martin (Belgium) Didier Theys	Waterloo Motors
Second		(Spain) Luis Pérez-Sala (France) Olivier Grouillard (Germany) Winfried Vogt	Bigazzi
Third		(France) Pascal Fabre (France) Fabien Giroix (Belgium) Bernard de Dryver	Garage du Bac
Fastest Lap
Driver		(Belgium) Thierry Boutsen	Eggenberger Motorsport
Time		2:39.930	

The 1987 Spa 24 Hour was the fifth round of the inaugural World Touring Car Championship. The race was held for cars eligible for Group A touring car regulations. It was held from 1 to 2 August 1987 at the Circuit de Spa-Francorchamps, in Francorchamps, Belgium.

The race was won by Eric van de Poele, Jean-Michel Martin and Didier Theys, driving a BMW M3. The leading car eligible for championship points was another M3, driven by Luis Pérez-Sala, Olivier Grouillard and Winfried Vogt, who finished in second place.

== Class structure ==
Cars were divided into three classes based on engine capacity:

- Division 1: 1-1600cc
- Division 2: 1601-2500cc
- Division 3: Over 2500cc

== Official results ==
Results were as follows: | Entered: 61 | Started: 61 | Finished: 28

Pos	Class	No	Team	Drivers	Car	Laps	Qual Pos	Series Points
1	2	48	Waterloo Motors	(Belgium) Eric van de Poele (Belgium) Jean-Michel Martin (Belgium) Didier Theys	BMW M3	481	7	
2	2	43	(Italy) Bigazzi	(Spain) Luis Pérez-Sala (France) Olivier Grouillard (Germany) Winfried Vogt	BMW M3	473	23	40
3	2	63	Garage du Bac	(France) Pascal Fabre (France) Fabien Giroix (Belgium) Bernard de Dryver	BMW M3	469	8	
4	3	5	(Australia) Allan Moffat Racing	(Canada) Allan Moffat (Australia) John Harvey (Australia) Tony Mulvihill	Holden VL Commodore SS Group A	468	19	
5	2	41	(Germany) BMW Motorsport	(Germany) Altfrid Heger (Germany) Christian Danner (Germany) Franz Dufter	BMW M3	464	6	
6	3	17	(United Kingdom) Andy Rouse Engineering	(Belgium) Alain Semoulin (Spain) Jésus Pareja (Belgium) Thierry Tassin	Ford Sierra RS Cosworth	464	13	
7	2	47	(Germany) BMW Motorsport	(Netherlands) Gerrit van Kouwen (Germany) Annette Meeuvissen (Germany) Mercedes Stermitz	BMW M3	464	36	
8	3	18	Waterloo Motors	(Belgium) Marc Duez (Belgium) Philip Verellen (Belgium) Raijmond van Hove (Belgium) Pascal Witmeur	BMW 635CSi	458	34	
9	2	55	Ecurie Motul Nogaro	(France) Bernard Salam (France) Pierre Destic (France) Alain Cudini	Mercedes 190E	456	22	
10	2	45	Auto Budde Team	(Germany) Volker Strycek (Germany) Franz-Josef Bröhling (Germany) Hermann Tilke	BMW 325i	452	37	
11	2	77	(Italy) Brixia Corse	(Italy) Gabriele Tarquini (Italy) Rinaldo Drovandi (Italy) Claudio Langes	Alfa Romeo 75	451	20	30
12	2	75	(Italy) Alfa Corse	(France) Jacques Laffite (Italy) Paolo Barilla (France) Jean-Louis Schlesser (Italy) Nicola Larini (Italy) Giorgio Pianta	Alfa Romeo 75	447	10	24
13	2	44	Bastos Racing Team	(France) Gérard Bleynie (France) Lucien Guitteny (France) Jean-Pierre Jabouille	BMW M3	435	21	
14	1	90	Bemani Toyota	(Germany) Herbert Lingmann (Germany) Ludwig Hölzl (Switzerland) Philippe Müller	Toyota Corolla GT	431	55	
15	1	112		(Belgium) Paul Simons (Belgium) Valentin Simons (Belgium) Marcel Vandermaesen	Toyota Corolla GT	431	58	
16	2	76	(Italy) Alfa Corse	(Italy) Walter Voulaz (Italy) Marcello Cipriani (Italy) Massimo Siena	Alfa Romeo 75	429	47	20
17	2	71	(Italy) Luigi Racing	(Belgium) Georges Cremer (Italy) Marco Curti (Belgium) Loris de Sordi	Alfa Romeo 75	426	39	
18	1	103	IMC Toyota	(Belgium) Pierre Fermine (Belgium) Serge de Liedekerke (Belgium) Grégorie de Mévius	Toyota Corolla GT	424	51	
19	3	33	Bavaria Automobiles	(France) Philippe Haezebrouck (France) Pierre de Thoisy (Belgium) Harald Huysman (Belgium) Pascal Witmeur	BMW 635CSi	423	33	
20	3	24	Formula 1 Invest. PTY Ltd.	(Belgium) Michel Delcourt (Belgium) Alex Guyaux (Australia) Graham Moore	Holden VL Commodore SS Group A	421	35	
21	3	31	CMS Sweden	(Sweden) Christer Simonsen (Sweden) Kurt Simonsen (Belgium) Jean-Marie Baert	Volvo 240T	418	41	
22	2	79	(Italy) Alfa Corse	(Italy) Alessandro Nannini (Italy) Giorgio Francia (France) Jean-Louis Schlesser (Italy) Giorgio Pianta	Alfa Romeo 75	417	14	16
23	2	61	Ecurie Chardon des Dunes	(Belgium) Noël van den Eeckhout (Belgium) Guy Van Mol (Belgium) Mike van Hooydonk	BMW 325i	415	45	
24	1	104	IMC Toyota	(Belgium) Guy Katsers (Belgium) Jean-Claude Burton (Belgium) Jean-Pierre Van de Wauwer	Toyota Corolla GT	414	59	
25	1	117	IMC Toyota	(Belgium) José Close (Belgium) André Hardy (Belgium) Emmanuel Remion	Toyota Corolla GT	414	60	
26	2	46	(Germany) Schnitzer Motorsport	(Austria) Roland Ratzenberger (Austria) Dieter Quester (Germany) Markus Oestreich (Italy) Roberto Ravaglia	BMW M3	413	12	12
27	1	119	IMC Toyota	(Denmark) John Nielsen (Belgium) Michel Luxen (Belgium) Renaud Verreydt	Toyota Corolla GT	408	53	
28	1	120	IMC Toyota	(Belgium) Claude Holvoet (Italy) Giovanni Bruno (Belgium) Didier Noirhomme	Toyota Corolla GT	378	62	
DNF	2	59	Bastos Racing Team	(Belgium) Dirk Vermeersch (Venezuela) Giovanni Fontanesi (Italy) Massimo Micangeli	BMW M3	445	31	
DNF	3	16	Bavaria Automobiles	(France) René Metge (France) Jean-Pierre Jaussaud (France) Joël Gouhier (Belgium) Pascal Witmeur	BMW 635CSi	423	25	
DNF	3	7	(Switzerland) Eggenberger Motorsport	(Germany) Klaus Ludwig (Belgium) Thierry Boutsen (Germany) Klaus Niedzwiedz	Ford Sierra RS Cosworth	406	1	
DNF	3	15	Bastos Toyota Team	(Sweden) Anders Olofsson (Belgium) Pierre-Alain Thibaut (Belgium) Éric Bachelart	Toyota Supra	346	43	
DNF	3	6	(Switzerland) Eggenberger Motorsport	(United Kingdom) Steve Soper (Belgium) Pierre Dieudonné (France) Philippe Streiff	Ford Sierra RS Cosworth	332	2	
DNF	2	42	(Germany) BMW Motorsport	(Venezuela) Johnny Cecotto (Italy) Gianfranco Brancatelli (Italy) Mauro Baldi	BMW M3	310	3	
DNF	3	8	(United Kingdom) Andy Rouse Engineering	(United Kingdom) Andy Rouse (Belgium) Thierry Tassin (United Kingdom) Win Percy	Ford Sierra RS Cosworth	252	5	
DNF	2	40	(Germany) Schnitzer Motorsport	(Italy) Ivan Capelli (Italy) Roberto Ravaglia (Italy) Emanuele Pirro	BMW M3	233	4	
DNF	3	3	(Australia) HDT Racing P/L	(Australia) Peter Brock (New Zealand) Neville Crichton (Australia) David Parsons	Holden VL Commodore SS Group A	206	18	
DNF	2	85	(Germany) Schnitzer Motorsport	(Australia) Allan Grice (Brazil) Roberto Moreno (Germany) Wilhelm Siller	BMW M3	178	15	
DNF	2	57	(Germany) Marko AMG	(Germany) Peter Oberndorfer (Austria) Franz Klammer (Germany) Peter John	Mercedes 190E	143	24	
DNF	2	78	(Italy) Alfa Corse	(Italy) Carlo Rossi (Italy) Alessandro Santin (Italy) Giacomo Bossini	Alfa Romeo 75	133	17	
DNF	2	58	Bastos Racing Team	(Czech Republic) Zdeněk Vojtěch (Italy) Maurizio Micangeli (Switzerland) Enzo Calderari	BMW M3	115	27	
DNF	1	113	Tom's GB Ltd.	(United Kingdom) Phil Dowsett (United Kingdom) Tiff Needell (Japan) Masanori Sekiya	Toyota Corolla GT	101	50	
DNF	2	66	J.M.S. Racing Team	(France) Claude Ballot-Léna (France) Jean-Pierre Malcher (France) Jean-Marc Smadja	BMW M3	82	11	
DNF	3	14	Bastos Toyota Team	(Germany) Hans Heyer (Germany) Frank Jelinski (Belgium) Eddy Joosen	Toyota Supra	59	32	
DNF	3	11	Wolf Racing Barclay	(Finland) Jari Nurminen (Belgium) André Malherbe (Switzerland) Jean-Denis Delétraz	Ford Sierra RS Cosworth	9	26	
DNF	3	4	Wolf Racing Barclay	(Germany) Joachim Winkelhock (France) Didier Artzet (Germany) Manfred Burkhard	Ford Sierra RS Cosworth	5	9	
DNF	2	49	N.K. Motorsport	(Germany) Jürgen Hamelmann (Germany) Robert Walterscheid-Müller (Belgium) Patrick de Radigues	BMW M3		28	
DNF	3	35	Garage du Bac	(France) Denis Morin (France) Ferdinand de Lesseps (Belgium) Hervé Regout	BMW 635CSi		29	
DNF	3	28	Ford Motorsport Luxembourg	(Luxembourg) Romain Feitler (Switzerland) Bernard Santal (Belgium) Gaston Rahier	Ford Sierra RS Cosworth		30	
DNF	3	19	Waterloo Motors	(Italy) Roberto Castagna (Italy) Roberto Orlandi (Belgium) Roger Visconti	BMW 635CSi		38	
DNF	3	32	Ford Motorsport Luxembourg	(Luxembourg) Romain Wolf (Belgium) Guy Neve (Belgium) Jean-Paul Libert	Ford Sierra RS Cosworth		40	
DNF	3	13	Zeus Computers Racing	(Belgium) Quirin Bovy (Belgium) Michel Maillien (Belgium) Vincent Bertinchamps	Rover Vitesse		42	
DNF	3	34	Jeroen Hin Racing	(Netherlands) Jeroen Hin (Netherlands) Frans Verschuur (Belgium) Stéphane Cohen	Holden VK Commodore SS Group A		44	
DNF	2	70	(Italy) Luigi Racing	(Belgium) François-Xavier Boucher (Belgium) Jean Hex (Belgium) Philippe Soreil	Alfa Romeo 75		46	
DNF	2	84	(Netherlands) Mazda Dealer Team Holland	(Netherlands) Hans van der Beek (Netherlands) Raymond Coronel (Netherlands) Loek Vermeulen	Mazda 929		48	
DNF	1	92	(United Kingdom) Team Toyota GB	(United Kingdom) Chris Hodgetts (New Zealand) Andrew Bagnall (New Zealand) Mark Jennings	Toyota Corolla GT		49	
DNF	3	29	Jumet Motor Racing	(Belgium) Jean Wansart (Belgium) Cyriel Raes	BMW 635CSi		52	
DNF	1	114	Tom's Co. Ltd.	(Japan) Hideshi Matsuda (Japan) Kaoru Hoshino (Japan) Kaori Okamoto	Toyota Corolla GT		54	
DNF	1	121	IMC Toyota	(Belgium) Roger Rutten (Belgium) Marc Dries (Belgium) Eddy van Esch	Toyota Corolla GT		56	
DNF	1	115	(Belgium) Belgian Audi VW Club	(Belgium) Philippe Ménage (Luxembourg) René Schenk (Belgium) Bernard Winderickx	VW Golf GTI		57	
DNF	1	100	(Italy) Alfa Corse	(Italy) Carlo Brambilla (Italy) Daniele Toffoli (Belgium) Alain Thiebaut	Alfa Romeo 33		61	

- Drivers in italics practiced in the car but did not take part in the race.

== See also ==
- 1987 World Touring Car Championship

World Touring Car Championship
Previous race: 1987 Nürburgring Touring Car Grand Prix	1987 season	Next race: 1987 Grand Prix Brno
