= Gianfranco Brancatelli =

Italian racing driver (born 1950)

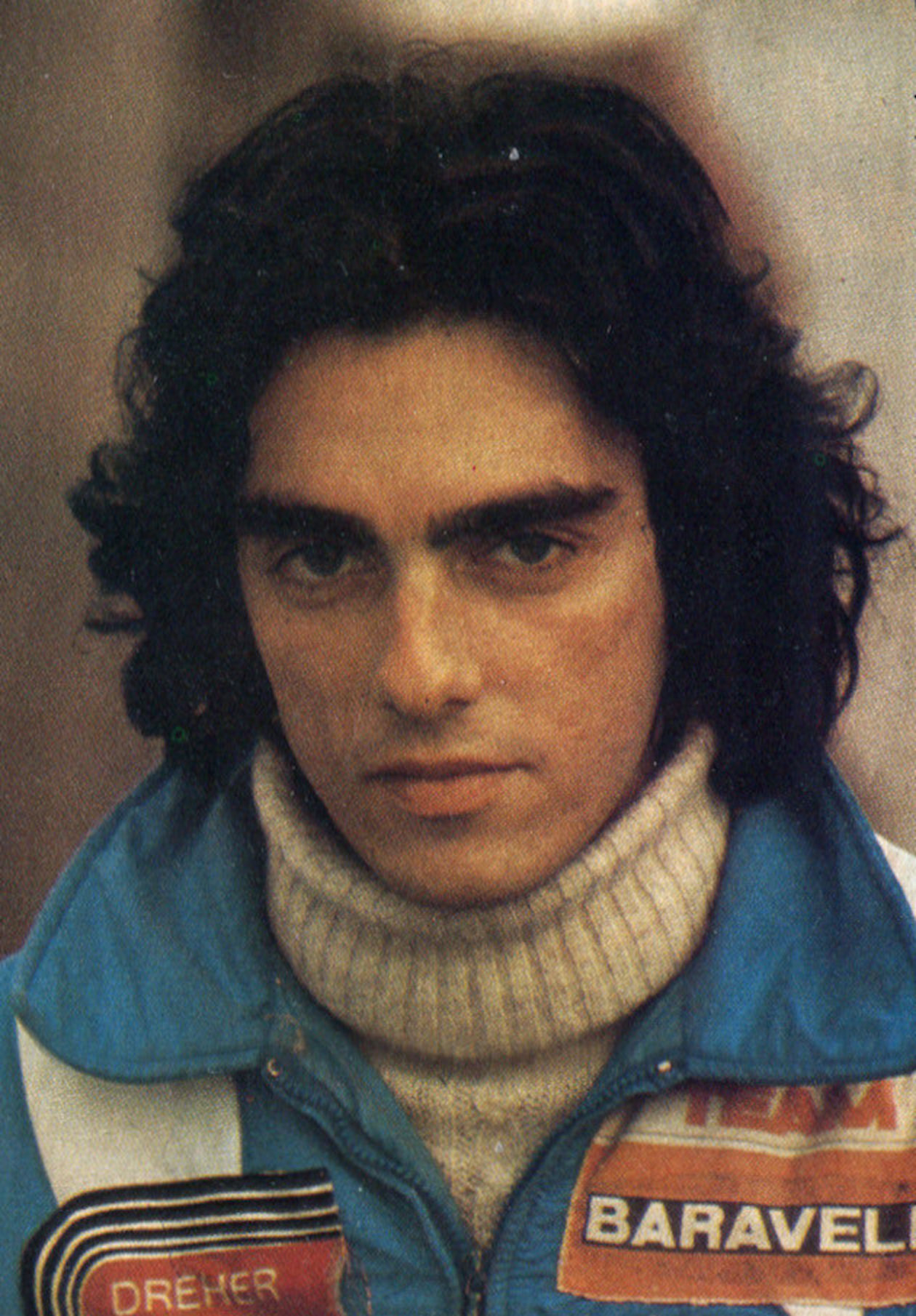
- Brancatelli in 1974
- Born: Gianfranco Gaetano Brancatelli; 18 January 1950 (age 76); Turin, Italy

Formula One World Championship career
- Nationality: (Italy) Italian
- Active years: 1979
- Team(s): Kauhsen, Merzario
- Entries: 3 (0 starts)
- Championships: 0
- Wins: 0
- Podiums: 0
- Career points: 0
- Pole positions: 0
- Fastest laps: 0
- First entry: 1979 Spanish Grand Prix
- Last entry: 1979 Monaco Grand Prix

Gianfranco Gaetano Brancatelli (born 18 January 1950) is a former racing driver from Italy.

== Career ==
Brancatelli's racing career began in 1973, in the Formula Abarth series. In 1975, he advanced to Italian Formula 3 racing. Brancatelli entered three Formula One Grands Prix in 1979 with Kauhsen (two failures to qualify) and Merzario (one failure to pre-qualify).

After his departure from Formula 1, Brancatelli went on to race in several Touring Car series, with some success. He would finish fourth in the 1984 European Touring Car Championship driving a BMW 635 CSi for Eggenberger Motorsport. For the 1985 ETCC, Eggenberger switched to the turbocharged Volvo 240T (while the championship winning Tom Walkinshaw Racing would switch from their powerful V12 Jaguar XJS' to the V8 powered Rover Vitesse), and along with Swedish driver Thomas Lindström, Brancatelli became the European Touring Car Champion, winning six out of fourteen races (Anderstorp, Zeltweg, Salzburgring, Nürburgring, Zolder and Estoril), along with three second places and two third places.

In 1986, Brancatelli switched to Tom Walkinshaw Racing where he drove a Rover Vitesse in the 1986 FIA International Touring Car Championship (essentially a renamed ETCC), but dropped to 12th in the standings winning only once at Andestorp. In 1987, he would again switch teams, driving a BMW M3 for Italian outfit CiBiemme Sport in the 1987 World Touring Car Championship where he partnered another former Formula One driver Johnny Cecotto to win the 500 km de Bourgogne at Dijon-Prenois. He finished eighth in the WTCC while finishing fifth in the 1987 ETCC, also for CiBiemme, winning twice at Estoril and Zolder.

The 1988 ETCC saw Brancatelli on the move again, this time going back to Eggenberger Motorsport where he would serve as a driver in the team's third Texaco Ford Sierra RS500 in a number of rounds. Brancatelli would also win the 1988 Italian Touring Car Championship driving a privately Jolly Club entered Alfa Romeo 75.

Other than his success in the 1985 ETCC, arguably Brancatelli's biggest wins in touring car racing were the 1985 Guia Race of Macau driving a Volvo 240T, and the 1989 Spa 24 Hours driving an Eggenberger Ford Sierra RS500 along with Bernd Schneider (yet another F1 driver, this time a current one) and Win Percy. During the late 1980s and early 1990s, Brancatelli also travelled to Australia to drive in the Bathurst 1000 touring car race, though success would generally elude him. His best finish was in the 1987 WTCC round, the 1987 James Hardie 1000 where he and Johnny Cecotto would finish seventh outright and third in class, though as they were the first registered WTCC drivers to finish the race they would receive top points for the round. His three other races at Bathurst in 1989, 1990 and 1991 would result in two failed to finish and one disqualification due to a technical infringement.

Brancatelli also raced at the 24 Hours of Le Mans on five occasions. His best finish was second place in the 1989 24 Hours of Le Mans driving a Sauber C9 for Team Sauber Mercedes, co-driving with ex-Formula One drivers Mauro Baldi and Kenny Acheson. His four other races at Le Mans (1979, 1980, 1986 and 1990) all saw him fail to finish the race.

Brancatelli would continue racing until his retirement in the late 1990s.

== Racing record ==
=== Complete European Formula Two Championship results ===
(key) (Races in bold indicate pole position; races in italics indicate fastest lap)

Year	Entrant	Chassis	Engine	1	2	3	4	5	6	7	8	9	10	11	12	13	Pos.	Pts
1976	Scuderia Everest	March 752	BMW	HOC	THR	VLL	SAL	PAU	HOC	ROU	MUG; 12	PER	EST	NOG	HOC		NC	0
1977	Scuderia Everest	Ralt RT1	Ferrari	SIL; DNS	THR; DNS	HOC	NÜR	VLL; 13	PAU; 12	MUG; 8	ROU; 4	NOG; Ret	PER; Ret	MIS; Ret	EST; DNQ	DON	17th	3
1978	Everest Racing Team	Chevron B40	BMW	THR	HOC; DNQ	NÜR	PAU	MUG	VLL								NC	0
1978	Bob Salisbury Racing	March 782	BMW							ROU; DNQ	DON; 8	NOG	PER; Ret	MIS; Ret	HOC		NC	0
1979	Racing Team Everest	March 792	BMW	SIL	HOC	THR	NÜR	VLL	MUG	PAU	HOC	ZAN; 10	PER; 7	MIS	DON; Ret		NC	0

=== Complete British Formula One Championship results ===
(key)

Year	Entrant	Chassis	Engine	1	2	3	4	5	6	7	8	9	10	11	12	13	14	15	Pos.	Pts
1979	Willi Kauhsen Racing Team	Kauhsen WK	Ford Cosworth DFV 3.0 V8	ZOL; Ret	OUL	BRH	MAL												NC	0
1979	Dicksons of Perth	March 772P	Hart 420R 2.0 L4					SNE; Ret	THR	ZAN	DON	OUL	NOG	MAL	BRH	THR	SNE	SIL	NC	0
1980	Colin Bennett Racing	Lotus 78	Ford Cosworth DFV 3.0 V8	OUL	BRH	SIL	MAL	THR	MNZ; Ret	MAL	SNE	BRH	THR	OUL	SIL				NC	0

=== Complete Formula One results ===
(key)

Year	Entrant	Chassis	Engine	1	2	3	4	5	6	7	8	9	10	11	12	13	14	15	WDC	Pts
1979	Willi Kauhsen Racing Team	Kauhsen WK	Ford Cosworth DFV 3.0 V8	ARG	BRA	RSA	USW	ESP; DNQ	BEL; DNQ										NC	0
1979	Team Merzario	Merzario A2	Ford Cosworth DFV 3.0 V8							MON; DNPQ	FRA	GBR	GER	AUT	NED	ITA	USA	CAN	NC	0

=== Complete European Touring Car Championship results ===
(key) (Races in bold indicate pole position) (Races in italics indicate fastest lap)

Year	Team	Car	1	2	3	4	5	6	7	8	9	10	11	12	13	14	Pos.	Pts
1980		BMW 3.0 CSi	MNZ; DNQ	VAL; 16	BRH; Ret	SAL	BRN; DNQ	PER	NÜR	SIL	ZOL						NC	0
1981	Dieter Schmid	BMW 635 CSi	MNZ	VLL	DON; 5	SAL	BRN	PER	SIL	ZOL								8
1982	Luigi Team	Alfa Romeo Alfetta GTV6	MNZ; 6	VLL; 6	DON; Ret	PER; DNS	MUG; 7	BRN; 7	SAL; 6	NÜR; Ret	SPA; Ret	SIL; Ret	ZOL; 7					30
1983	Jolly Club Milano	Alfa Romeo Alfetta GTV6	MNZ ?	VAL; 24	DON; Ret	PER; 6	MUG; Ret	BRN; Ret	ZEL; 14	NÜR; Ret	SAL; 8	SPA; 6	SIL; 23	ZOL; Ret				
1984	BMW Italia	BMW 635 CSi	MNZ; 2	VAL; 4	DON; Ret	PER; 4	BRN; 5	ZEL; 6	SAL; 3	NÜR; 1	SPA; Ret	SIL; 1	ZOL; Ret	MUG; 4			4th	151
1985	Eggenberger Motorsport	Volvo 240T	**MNZ**; Ret	VAL; 2	DON; 4	**AND**; 1	BRN; 2	**ZEL**; 1	SAL; 1	**NÜR**; 1	SPA; 3	SIL; 3	NOG; 6	ZOL; 1	**EST**; 1	**JAR**; 2	1st	240
1986	TWR – Bastos Texaco Racing Team	Rover Vitesse	MNZ	DON; 4	HOC; Ret	MIS	**AND**; 1	BRN; 4	ZEL; DNS	NÜR; 3	SPA	SIL; Ret	NOG; Ret	ZOL	JAR; 4	EST; 4	12th	123
1987	CiBiEmme Sport	BMW M3	DON; Ret	EST; 1	AND; 2	ZOL; Ret	ZEL; 1	IMO; 2	NOG; Ret								5th	150
1988	Jolly Club	Ford Sierra RS500	MNZ	DON	EST	JAR; Ret											26th	80
1988	Eggenberger Motorsport	Ford Sierra RS500					**DIJ**; 2	VLL; Ret	NÜR; 2	SPA; Ret	ZOL	SIL; 4	NOG				26th	80

=== Complete World Touring Car Championship results ===
(key) (Races in bold indicate pole position) (Races in italics indicate fastest lap)

Year	Team	Car	1	2	3	4	5	6	7	8	9	10	11	DC	Pts
1987	CiBiEmme Sport	BMW M3	MNZ	JAR ovr:8 cls:6	DIJ ovr:1 cls:1	NÜR; Ret	SPA; Ret	BRN ovr:5 cls:3	SIL; Ret	BAT ovr:7 cls:3	CLD ovr:4 cls:2	WEL; Ret	FUJ ovr:6 cls:3	8th	158

† Despite finishing 7th outright at Bathurst, as the highest placed registered WTCC car Brancatelli was awarded 1st place points for the round.

=== Complete British Touring Car Championship results ===
(key) (Races in bold indicate pole position in class) (Races in italics indicate fastest lap in class - 1 point awarded all races)

Year	Team	Car	Class	1	2	3	4	5	6	7	8	9	10	11	12	13	DC	Pts	Class
1988	Eggenberger Motorsport	Ford Sierra RS500	A	SIL	OUL	THR	DON	THR	SIL	SIL	BRH	SNE	BRH	BIR	DON	SIL ovr:1 cls:1	23rd	10	9th

=== Complete Deutsche Tourenwagen Meisterschaft results ===
(key) (Races in bold indicate pole position) (Races in italics indicate fastest lap)

Year	Team	Car	1	2	3	4	5	6	7	8	9	10	11	12	13	14	15	16	17	18	19	20	21	22	Pos.	Pts
1989	Ford Motorsport Eggenberger	Ford Sierra RS 500 Cosworth	ZOL; 1; 23	ZOL; 2 Ret	HOC; 1; 14	HOC; 2; 8	NÜR; 1; 10	NÜR; 2; 10	MFA; 1; 11	MFA; 2; 13	AVU; 1 DNS	AVU; 2 DNS	NÜR; 1; 13	NÜR; 2; 11	NOR; 1; 11	NOR; 2 Ret	HOC; 1; 9	HOC; 2; 11	DIE; 1; 5	DIE; 2; 2	NÜR; 1; 11	NÜR; 2; 10	HOC; 1; 4	HOC; 2; 9	9th	162

=== Complete Australian Super Touring Championship results ===
Year	Team	Car	1	2	3	4	5	6	7	8	9	10	11	12	13	14	15	16	DC	Pts
1997	Team Petronas PX2	Ford Mondeo Ghia	LAK; 1	LAK; 2	PHI; 1 Ret	PHI; 2 Ret	CAL; 1	CAL; 2	AMA; 1	AMA; 2	WIN; 1	WIN; 2	MAL; 1	MAL; 2	LAK; 1	LAK; 2	AMA; 1	AMA; 2	NC	0

=== Complete 24 Hours of Le Mans results ===
Year	Team	Co-Drivers	Car	Class	Laps	Pos.	Class Pos.
1979	(Italy) Carlo Pietromarchi	(Italy) Carlo Pietromarchi (Italy) Maurizio Micangeli	De Tomaso Pantera	Gr.5 +2.0	108	NC	NC
1980	(Italy) Scuderia Lancia Corse	(Italy) Piercarlo Ghinzani (Finland) Markku Alén	Lancia Beta Monte Carlo	Gr.5	26	DNF	DNF
1986	(United Kingdom) Silk Cut Jaguar (United Kingdom) Tom Walkinshaw Racing	(United Kingdom) Win Percy (United States) Hurley Haywood	Jaguar XJR-6	C1	154	DNF	DNF
1989	(West Germany) Team Sauber Mercedes	(Italy) Mauro Baldi (United Kingdom) Kenny Acheson	Sauber C9 Mercedes-Benz	C1	384	**2nd**	**2nd**
1990	(Japan) Nissan Motorsports International	(United Kingdom) Mark Blundell (United Kingdom) Julian Bailey	Nissan R90CK	C1	142	DNF	DNF

=== Complete Bathurst 1000 results ===
Year	Team	Co-Drivers	Car	Class	Laps	Pos.	Class Pos.
1987	(Italy) CiBiEmme Sport (West Germany) BMW Motorsport	(Venezuela) Johnny Cecotto	BMW M3	2	161	7th	**3rd**
1989	(New Zealand) Mark Petch Motorsport	(New Zealand) Robbie Francevic	Ford Sierra RS500	A	14	DNF	DNF
1990	(New Zealand) Mark Petch Motorsport	(United Kingdom) Robb Gravett	Ford Sierra RS500	1	118	DNF	DNF
1991	(Australia) Allan Moffat Enterprises	(Australia) Charlie O'Brien	Ford Sierra RS500	1	158	DSQ	DSQ

Sporting positions
Preceded by Tom Walkinshaw	European Touring Car Championship; Champion; 1985; With: Thomas Lindström	Succeeded by Roberto Ravaglia
Preceded by Tom Walkinshaw	Guia Race; Winner; 1985	Succeeded by Johnny Cecotto
Preceded by Michele di Gioia	Italia Superturismo Championship; Champion; 1988	Succeeded by Johnny Cecotto
Preceded by Altfrid Heger; Dieter Quester; Roberto Ravaglia	Winner of the Spa 24 Hours; 1989; With: Win Percy & Bernd Schneider	Succeeded by Markus Oestreich; Fabien Giroix; Johnny Cecotto
