= Pierre Dieudonné =

Belgian racing driver (born 1947)

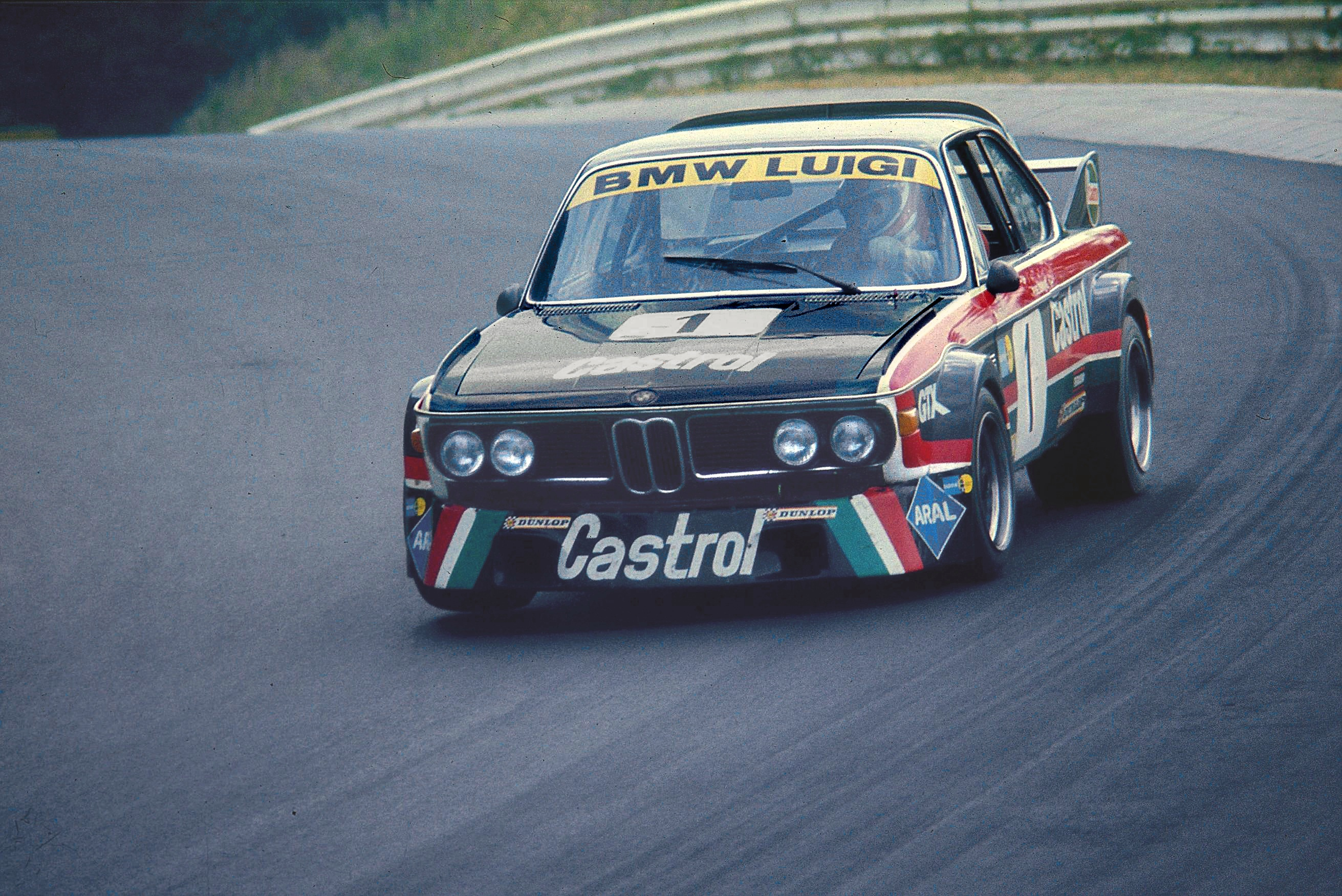
BMW CSL (Stuck, Xhenceval and Dieudonné), Nürburgring 6h-Race 1973

Pierre Dieudonné (born 24 March 1947 in Brussels) is a Belgian auto racing driver and motoring journalist.

== Career ==
Dieudonné spent a large part of his career competing in touring car racing. He twice finished third in the European Touring Car Championship in 1977 and 1979. He won two consecutive Spa 24 Hours in 1974 and 1975 with a BMW 3.0 CSi. He won the title again in 1981 alongside Tom Walkinshaw in a Mazda RX-7.

In 1987, Dieudonné competed in the inaugural World Touring Car Championship for the Eggenberger Motorsport works Ford team driving the RS Cosworth and RS500 versions of the Ford Sierra. His teammates for the championship were West German pair Klaus Ludwig and Klaus Niedzwiedz and Englishman Steve Soper, who was his regular co-driver. He won Round 8 of the championship, the Bob Jane T-Marts 500 at the Calder Park Raceway in Australia, which was run on a combined road course and the NASCAR-style "Thunderdome" high-banked oval, driving with Soper, and finished fifth in the championship (Dieudonné and Soper had won the Bathurst 1000 in Australia the week before the Calder race, but were disqualified for illegal wheel arch modifications). He finished third in the ETCC in the 1988 season, again for Eggenberger. Dieudonné competed in one round of the 1989 British Touring Car Championship for JQF Engineering with Chris Hodgetts in a Ford Sierra RS500. That same year he was a 1989 24 Hours of Le Mans GTP Class winner with Hodgetts and David Kennedy for Mazdaspeed. The 1991 24 Hours of Le Mans saw him finish eighth for Mazdaspeed in a Mazda 787 in the C2 Class.

Dieudonné also made the trip to Australia on other occasions to drive in the Bathurst 1000. After the 1987 disqualification, he returned in 1988 to drive a Sierra alongside Andrew Bagnall (Bagnall's Sierra was an Andy Rouse 'kit car', Rouse being the pioneer of racing Sierras in Europe and one of the main Sierra's rivals to the Eggenberger team). After Dieudonné qualified the car in seventh place, the car ran into overheating problems and only lasted nine of the scheduled 161 laps. He returned in 1989 to drive an Eggenberger built Sierra for Allan Moffat Racing with Gregg Hansford, the pair qualified 14th but the car was out after only 30 laps. Again racing for Moffat in 1990, "The Dude" (as he was known in Australia) drove both team cars, recording a DNF in the car he shared with Hansford and Niedzwiedz, and 10th in the teams lead car with Niedzwiedz and Biela in what was his last race at the Mount Panorama Circuit.

== Career results ==
Season	Series	Position	Car	Team
1973	European Formula Super Vee Championship	21st		
1975	B.A.R.C. BP Super Visco British F3 Championship	9th	March 753-BMW	Bang & Olufsen Team Michel Vaillant
1975	Italian Formula Three Championship	NC	March 753-BMW	Bang & Olufsen Team Michel Vaillant
1976	B.A.R.C. BP Super Visco British F3 Championship	18th	March 743-Toyota	Dr. Joseph Ehrlich
1976	B.R.D.C. Shellsport British F3 Championship	21st	March 743-Toyota	Dr. Joseph Ehrlich
1976	European Touring Car Championship	1st	BMW 3.0 CSL	Luigi Racing
1977	European Touring Car Championship	3rd	BMW 3.0 CSL	Luigi Racing
1977	B.R.D.C. Vandervell British F3 Championship	25th	Ehrlich ES6-Toyota	Dr. Joseph Ehrlich
1979	European Touring Car Championship	3rd	BMW 3.0 CSL	Luigi Racing
1980	Belgian Touring Car Championship	1st	Mazda RX-7	Tom Walkinshaw Racing
1982	World Sportscar Championship	70th	Ferrari 512BB LM; URD C81-BMW	Prancing Horse Farm Racing; URD Junior
1985	European Touring Car Championship	9th	Volvo 240T	Eggenberger Motorsport
1985	World Sportscar Championship	93rd	Cheetah G604-Aston Martin	Cheetah Switzerland
1986	FIA Touring Car Championship	12th	Ford Sierra XR4Ti	Eggenberger Motorsport
1987	World Touring Car Championship	5th	Ford Sierra RS Cosworth; Ford Sierra RS500	Eggenberger Motorsport
1988	European Touring Car Championship	3rd	Ford Sierra RS500	Eggenberger Motorsport
1988	Belgian Touring Car Championship Div 2	25th	Suzuki Swift GTi	Suzuki Belgium
1989	British Touring Car Championship	50th	Ford Sierra RS500	JQF Engineering
1989	World Sportscar Championship	46th	Mazda 767B	Mazdaspeed
1989	Deutsche Tourenwagen Meisterschaft	37th	Ford Sierra RS500	Ringshausen Motorsport
1990	Australian Endurance Championship	41st	Ford Sierra RS500	Allan Moffat Racing
1990	All Japan Sports Prototype Car Endurance Championship	26th	Mazda 767B; Mazda 787	Mazdaspeed
1991	All Japan Sports Prototype Car Endurance Championship	33rd	Mazda 787B	Mazdaspeed
1991	World Sportscar Championship	34th	Mazda 787B	Mazdaspeed

=== Complete World Touring Car Championship results ===
(key) (Races in bold indicate pole position) (Races in italics indicate fastest lap)

Year	Team	Car	1	2	3	4	5	6	7	8	9	10	11	DC	Points
1987	(Switzerland) Ford Texaco Racing Team	Ford Sierra RS Cosworth	MNZ; DSQ	**JAR** ovr:4 cls:1	DIJ ovr:4 cls:2	NUR; Ret	SPA; Ret							5th	193
1987	(Switzerland) Ford Texaco Racing Team	Ford Sierra RS500						BNO ovr:2 cls:2	**SIL** ovr:13 cls:4	BAT; DSQ	CLD ovr:1 cls:1	WEL ovr:3 cls:2	FJI ovr:5 cls:3	5th	193

Silverstone shows overall results for all cars. For registered WTCC cars, Dieudonné finished 7th in points and 2nd in class.

=== Complete Asia-Pacific Touring Car Championship results ===
(key) (Races in bold indicate pole position) (Races in italics indicate fastest lap)

Year	Team	Car	1	2	3	4	DC	Points
1988	(Australia) Miedecke Motorsport	Ford Sierra RS500	BAT; Ret	WEL; Ret	PUK; 7	FJI	NC	0

=== Complete British Touring Car Championship results ===
(key) (Races in bold indicate pole position; races in italics indicate fastest lap.)

Year	Team	Car	Class	1	2	3	4	5	6	7	8	9	10	11	12	13	DC	Pts	Class
1989	JQF Engineering	Ford Sierra RS500	A	OUL	SIL	THR	DON ovr:5‡ cls:5‡	THR	SIL	SIL	BRH	SNE	BRH	BIR	DON	SIL	51st	2	20th

‡ Endurance driver.

=== Complete Deutsche Tourenwagen Meisterschaft results ===
(key) (Races in bold indicate pole position) (Races in italics indicate fastest lap)

Year	Team	Car	1	2	3	4	5	6	7	8	9	10	11	12	13	14	15	16	17	18	19	20	21	22	DC	Pts
1989	Ford Ringhausen Motorsport	Ford Sierra RS500	ZOL; 1	ZOL; 2	HOC; 1	HOC; 2	NÜR; 1	NÜR; 2	MFA; 1	MFA; 2	AVU; 1; 22	AVU; 2 Ret	NÜR; 1; 16	NÜR; 2; 16	NOR; 1	NOR; 2	HOC; 1	HOC; 2	DIE; 1	DIE; 2	NÜR; 1	NÜR; 2	HOC; 1	HOC; 2	38th	6

=== Complete 24 Hours of Le Mans results ===
Year	Team	Co-Drivers	Car	Class	Laps	Pos.	Class Pos.
1977	(Belgium) Luigi Racing	(Belgium) Jean Xhenceval (Italy) Spartaco Dini	BMW 3.0 CSL	IMSA	294	8th	1st
1980	(France) JMS Racing (France) Charles Pozzi	(Belgium) Jean Xhenceval (Belgium) Hervé Regout	Ferrari 512BB/LM	IMSA	312	10th	3rd
1981	(Belgium) Rennod Racing	(Belgium) Jean Xhenceval (Belgium) Jean-Paul Libert	Ferrari 512BB/LM	IMSA	320	9th	3rd
1982	(United States) Prancing Horse Farm Racing	(United States) Carson Baird (Belgium) Jean-Paul Libert	Ferrari 512BB/LM	IMSA GTX	322	6th	3rd
1984	(Japan) Mazdaspeed	(Japan) Takashi Yorino (Japan) Yojiro Terada	Mazda 727C	C2	261	20th	6th
1986	(Japan) Mazdaspeed Co. Ltd.	(Republic of Ireland) David Kennedy (Republic of Ireland) Mark Galvin	Mazda 757	GTP	137	DNF	DNF
1987	(Japan) Mazdaspeed Co. Ltd.	(Republic of Ireland) David Kennedy (Republic of Ireland) Mark Galvin	Mazda 757	GTP	319	7th	1st
1988	(Japan) Mazdaspeed Co. Ltd.	(Japan) Yojiro Terada (Republic of Ireland) David Kennedy	Mazda 757	GTP	337	15th	1st
1989	(Japan) Mazdaspeed Co. Ltd.	(Republic of Ireland) David Kennedy (United Kingdom) Chris Hodgetts	Mazda 767B	GTP	368	7th	1st
1990	(Japan) Mazdaspeed Co. Ltd.	(Sweden) Stefan Johansson (Republic of Ireland) David Kennedy	Mazda 787	C2	147	DNF	DNF
1991	(Japan) Mazdaspeed Co. Ltd. (France) Oreca	(Japan) Takashi Yorino (Japan) Yojiro Terada	Mazda 787	C2	346	8th	8th

=== Complete Spa 24 Hour results ===
Year	Team	Co-Drivers	Car	Class	Laps	Pos.	Class Pos.
1974	(Belgium) Luigi Racing	(Belgium) Jean Xhenceval (Belgium) Alain Peltier	BMW 3.0 CSi	Div.4	194	1st	1st
1975	(Belgium) Luigi Racing	(Belgium) Jean Xhenceval (Belgium) Hughes de Fierlant	BMW 3.0 CSi	Div.4	300	1st	1st
1976	(Belgium) Luigi Racing	(Belgium) Jean Xhenceval (Italy) Martino Finotto	BMW 3.0 CSL	Div.4	NA	DNF	DNF
1977	(Belgium) Luigi BMW Racing with Castrol	(Belgium) Jean Xhenceval	BMW 530i US	+2500	NA	DNF	DNF
1978	(Belgium) Luigi Racing Lotto	(Belgium) Jo De Gheldere (Belgium) J.P. Wielemans	BMW 530i US	+2500	281	9th	7th
1979	(Belgium) Team Willeme	(Belgium) Thierry Boutsen (Belgium) Philippe Bervoets	BMW 530i	+2500	NA	DNF	DNF
1980	(Belgium) Juma	(Belgium) Eddy Joosen (Belgium) Dirk Vermeersch	BMW 530i	+2500	425	2nd	2nd
1981	(United Kingdom) Tom Walkinshaw Racing	(United Kingdom) Tom Walkinshaw	Mazda RX-7	-2500	456	1st	1st
1982	(United Kingdom) Team Motul Jaguar	(United Kingdom) Jeff Allam (United Kingdom) Pete Lovett	Jaguar XJS	Div.3	(9th Hour)	DNF	DNF
1983	(United Kingdom) TWR Jaguar Racing with Motul	(United Kingdom) Tom Walkinshaw	Jaguar XJS	Div.3	(11th Hour)	DNF	DNF
1984	(Belgium) GTM Engineering	(Belgium) Michel Delcourt (Belgium) Philippe Bervoets (Belgium) Jean-Marie Baert	Volvo 240T	Div.3	422	15th	15th
1985	(Switzerland) Eggenberger Motorsport	(Italy) Carlo Rossi (Belgium) Didier Theys	Volvo 240T	Div.3	489	4th	4th
1986	(Switzerland) Eggenberger Motorsport	(West Germany) Siegfried Müller Jr. (West Germany) Manuel Reuter	Ford Sierra XR4Ti	Div.3	35	DNF	DNF
1987	(Switzerland) Eggenberger Motorsport	(United Kingdom) Steve Soper (France) Philippe Streiff	Ford Sierra RS Cosworth	Div.3	322	DNF	DNF
1988	(Switzerland) Eggenberger Motorsport	(West Germany) Klaus Ludwig (Belgium) Thierry Boutsen	Ford Sierra RS500	Div.3	506	2nd	1st

=== Complete Bathurst 1000 results ===
Year	Team	Co-Drivers	Car	Class	Laps	Pos.	Class Pos.
1987	(Switzerland) Ford Texaco Racing Team	(United Kingdom) Steve Soper	Ford Sierra RS500	1	161	DSQ	DSQ
1988	(Australia) Andrew Bagnall	(New Zealand) Andrew Bagnall	Ford Sierra RS500	A	9	DNF	DNF
1989	(Australia) Allan Moffat Enterprises	(Australia) Gregg Hansford	Ford Sierra RS500	A	30	DNF	DNF
1990	(Australia) Allan Moffat Enterprises	(West Germany) Frank Biela (Germany) Klaus Niedzwiedz	Ford Sierra RS500	1	151	10th	10th
1990	(Australia) Allan Moffat Enterprises	(Australia) Gregg Hansford (Germany) Klaus Niedzwiedz	Ford Sierra RS500	1	138	DNF	DNF
