= 1987 World Touring Car Championship =

Champions
- World Drivers' Champion: Roberto Ravaglia
- World Entrants' Champion: Eggenberger Motorsport

Seasons
- ← none 2005 →

The 1987 World Touring Car Championship was the inaugural World Touring Car Championship. It commenced on 22 March 1987 and ended on 15 November after eleven races. The championship was open to Touring Cars complying with FIA Group A regulations. The Drivers title was won by Roberto Ravaglia in a BMW M3 and the Entrants title by Eggenberger Motorsport with the Ford Sierra Cosworth No 7.

== Teams and drivers ==
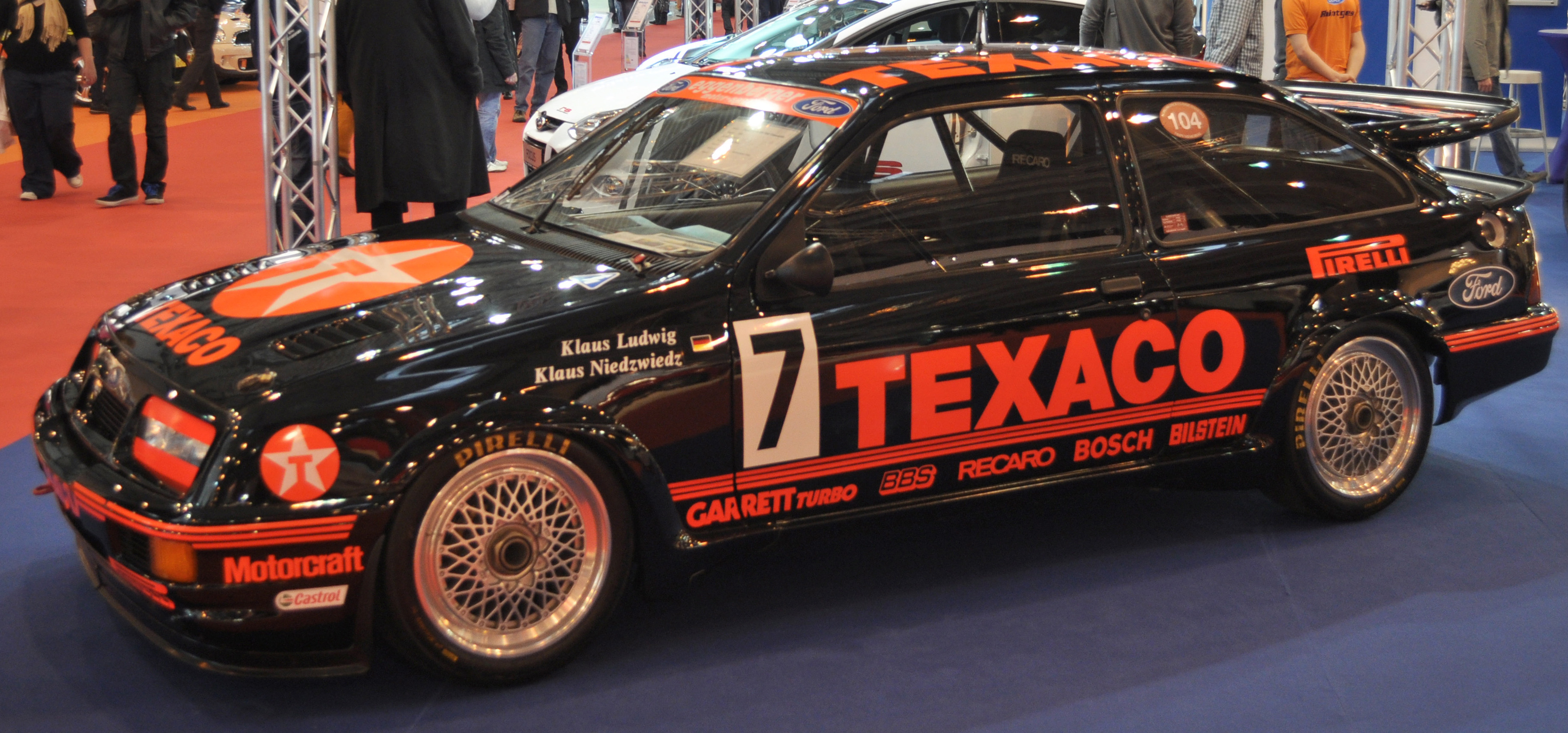
The No. 7 Eggenberger Motorsport Ford Sierra Cosworth of Klaus Ludwig and Klaus Niedzwiedz at the 2011 Essen Motor Show. Eggenberger Motorsport won the 1987 WTCC Entrants Championship

Fifteen registered entries were received for the championship. Regulations imposed by last minute series promoter Bernie Ecclestone dictated that for teams to receive official points and prize money they must have paid the US$60,000 registration fee. This in fact saw a number of the top teams, most notably Tom Walkinshaw Racing who had been the team to beat in the 1984, 1985 and 1986 European Touring Car Championships, refuse to pay and virtually ignore the championship.

Among those who did commit to the championship were the Ford Europe backed Eggenberger Motorsport with their Texaco sponsored Ford Sierra turbo's, Andy Rouse's team who ran their own Ford Sierra Cosworth, the factory backed BMW teams of West Germany's Schnitzer Motorsport and the Italian CiBiEmme and Bigazzi teams racing the new BMW M3 which had replaced the old 635 CSi as BMW's main challenger, and the Alfa Corse team with their factory Alfa Romeo 75 turbo's.

Although numerous other entries competed in races during the season only the following were eligible to score championship points. Ironically, two outright race winning teams in the championship were not eligible for championship points. Cars competed in three engine capacity divisions:

- Division 1: up to 1600 cm^{3}
- Division 2: 1601 to 2500 cm^{3}
- Division 3: Over 2500 cm^{3}

No.	Team	Car	Div.	Tyre	Rounds	Driver	Rounds
1	(Italy) Pro Team Italia/Imberti	Maserati Biturbo	3	D	1, 3-4, 6-9	(Italy) Bruno Giacomelli	1, 3-4, 6
1	(Italy) Pro Team Italia/Imberti	Maserati Biturbo	3	D	1, 3-4, 6-9	(Germany) Armin Hahne	1, 3-4, 6-9
1	(Italy) Pro Team Italia/Imberti	Maserati Biturbo	3	D	1, 3-4, 6-9	(Italy) Marcello Gunella	1, 4, 6
1	(Italy) Pro Team Italia/Imberti	Maserati Biturbo	3	D	1, 3-4, 6-9	(Switzerland) Mario Hytten	7
1	(Italy) Pro Team Italia/Imberti	Maserati Biturbo	3	D	1, 3-4, 6-9	(Italy) Nicola Tesini	7
1	(Italy) Pro Team Italia/Imberti	Maserati Biturbo	3	D	1, 3-4, 6-9	(Australia) Kevin Bartlett	8-9
2	(Italy) Pro Team Italia/Imberti	Maserati Biturbo	3	D	3	(Switzerland) Mario Hytten	3
2	(Italy) Pro Team Italia/Imberti	Maserati Biturbo	3	D	3	(Italy) Marcello Gunella	3
4	(Italy) Pro Team Italia/Imberti	Maserati Biturbo	3	D	9	(Italy) Marcello Gunella	9
4	(Italy) Pro Team Italia/Imberti	Maserati Biturbo	3	D	9	(Italy) Nicola Tesini	9
4	(Italy) Pro Team Italia/Imberti	Maserati Biturbo	3	D	9	(Italy) Stefano Livio	9
6	(Switzerland) Eggenberger Motorsport	Ford Sierra RS Cosworth; Ford Sierra RS500	3	P	All	(United Kingdom) Steve Soper	1-10
6	(Switzerland) Eggenberger Motorsport	Ford Sierra RS Cosworth; Ford Sierra RS500	3	P	All	(West Germany) Klaus Niedzwiedz	1-3, 11
6	(Switzerland) Eggenberger Motorsport	Ford Sierra RS Cosworth; Ford Sierra RS500	3	P	All	(Belgium) Pierre Dieudonné	4-10
6	(Switzerland) Eggenberger Motorsport	Ford Sierra RS Cosworth; Ford Sierra RS500	3	P	All	(France) Philippe Streiff	5
6	(Switzerland) Eggenberger Motorsport	Ford Sierra RS Cosworth; Ford Sierra RS500	3	P	All	(West Germany) Klaus Ludwig	11
7	(Switzerland) Eggenberger Motorsport	Ford Sierra RS Cosworth; Ford Sierra RS500	3	P	All	(West Germany) Klaus Ludwig	1-10
7	(Switzerland) Eggenberger Motorsport	Ford Sierra RS Cosworth; Ford Sierra RS500	3	P	All	(Belgium) Pierre Dieudonné	1-3, 11
7	(Switzerland) Eggenberger Motorsport	Ford Sierra RS Cosworth; Ford Sierra RS500	3	P	All	(West Germany) Klaus Niedzwiedz	4-10
7	(Switzerland) Eggenberger Motorsport	Ford Sierra RS Cosworth; Ford Sierra RS500	3	P	All	(Belgium) Thierry Boutsen	5
7	(Switzerland) Eggenberger Motorsport	Ford Sierra RS Cosworth; Ford Sierra RS500	3	P	All	(United Kingdom) Steve Soper	11
8	(Switzerland) Eggenberger Motorsport	Ford Sierra RS500	3	P	11	(West Germany) Armin Hahne	11
8	(Switzerland) Eggenberger Motorsport	Ford Sierra RS500	3	P	11	(West Germany) Bernd Schneider	11
8	(United Kingdom) Andy Rouse Engineering	Ford Sierra RS Cosworth; Ford Sierra RS500	3	P	1-7	(United Kingdom) Andy Rouse	1-7
8	(United Kingdom) Andy Rouse Engineering	Ford Sierra RS Cosworth; Ford Sierra RS500	3	P	1-7	(Belgium) Thierry Tassin	1-7
8	(United Kingdom) Andy Rouse Engineering	Ford Sierra RS Cosworth; Ford Sierra RS500	3	P	1-7	(United Kingdom) Win Percy	5
40	(West Germany) Schnitzer	BMW M3	2	Y	All	(Italy) Ivan Capelli	1-5
40	(West Germany) Schnitzer	BMW M3	2	Y	All	(Italy) Roberto Ravaglia	1, 3-6, 8, 11
40	(West Germany) Schnitzer	BMW M3	2	Y	All	(Austria) Roland Ratzenberger	2, 7, 9-10
40	(West Germany) Schnitzer	BMW M3	2	Y	All	(Italy) Emanuele Pirro	5-6, 8
40	(West Germany) Schnitzer	BMW M3	2	Y	All	(West Germany) Markus Oestreich	7, 9-11
40	(West Germany) Schnitzer	BMW M3	2	Y	All	(Austria) Dieter Quester	11
42	(Italy) CiBiEmme Sport	BMW M3	2	P	All	(Italy) Riccardo Patrese	1
42	(Italy) CiBiEmme Sport	BMW M3	2	P	All	(Venezuela) Johnny Cecotto	All
42	(Italy) CiBiEmme Sport	BMW M3	2	P	All	(Italy) Gianfranco Brancatelli	2-11
42	(Italy) CiBiEmme Sport	BMW M3	2	P	All	(Italy) Mauro Baldi	5
43	(Italy) Bigazzi	BMW M3	2	P	All	(Spain) Luis Pérez-Sala	1-2, 4-7, 11
43	(Italy) Bigazzi	BMW M3	2	P	All	(France) Olivier Grouillard	1-2, 4-8, 10-11
43	(Italy) Bigazzi	BMW M3	2	P	All	(West Germany) Winfried Vogt	3, 5, 8-10
43	(Italy) Bigazzi	BMW M3	2	P	All	(West Germany) Markus Oestreich	3
43	(Italy) Bigazzi	BMW M3	2	P	All	(Austria) Altfrid Heger	8-9
46	(Germany) Schnitzer Motorsport	BMW M3	2	Y	All	(Italy) Emanuele Pirro	1-3, 7, 9-11
46	(Germany) Schnitzer Motorsport	BMW M3	2	Y	All	(Austria) Roland Ratzenberger	1, 3-8
46	(Germany) Schnitzer Motorsport	BMW M3	2	Y	All	(Italy) Roberto Ravaglia	2, 6-7, 9-11
46	(Germany) Schnitzer Motorsport	BMW M3	2	Y	All	(West Germany) Markus Oestreich	4-6, 8
46	(Germany) Schnitzer Motorsport	BMW M3	2	Y	All	(Austria) Dieter Quester	5
75	(Italy) Alfa Corse	Alfa Romeo 75 Turbo	2	P	1-7	(Italy) Alessandro Nannini	1-3
75	(Italy) Alfa Corse	Alfa Romeo 75 Turbo	2	P	1-7	(United States) Michael Andretti	1
75	(Italy) Alfa Corse	Alfa Romeo 75 Turbo	2	P	1-7	(France) Jacques Laffite	2-7
75	(Italy) Alfa Corse	Alfa Romeo 75 Turbo	2	P	1-7	(Italy) Paolo Barilla	4-7
75	(Italy) Alfa Corse	Alfa Romeo 75 Turbo	2	P	1-7	(France) Jean-Louis Schlesser	5
76	(Italy) Alfa Corse	Alfa Romeo 75 Turbo	2	P	1-7	(Italy) Giorgio Francia	1-4
76	(Italy) Alfa Corse	Alfa Romeo 75 Turbo	2	P	1-7	(Italy) Paolo Barilla	1-2
76	(Italy) Alfa Corse	Alfa Romeo 75 Turbo	2	P	1-7	(France) Jean-Louis Schlesser	3-4
76	(Italy) Alfa Corse	Alfa Romeo 75 Turbo	2	P	1-7	(Italy) Walter Voulaz	5-7
76	(Italy) Alfa Corse	Alfa Romeo 75 Turbo	2	P	1-7	(Italy) Marcello Cipriani	5-7
76	(Italy) Alfa Corse	Alfa Romeo 75 Turbo	2	P	1-7	(Italy) Massimo Siena	5
77	(Italy) Brixia Corse	Alfa Romeo 75 Turbo	2	P	1-7	(Italy) Rinaldo Drovandi	1-7
77	(Italy) Brixia Corse	Alfa Romeo 75 Turbo	2	P	1-7	(Italy) Gabriele Tarquini	1-2, 4-7
77	(Italy) Brixia Corse	Alfa Romeo 75 Turbo	2	P	1-7	(Italy) Claudio Langes	3, 5
78	(Italy) Brixia Corse	Alfa Romeo 75 Turbo	2	P	1-7	(Italy) Carlo Rossi	1-7
78	(Italy) Brixia Corse	Alfa Romeo 75 Turbo	2	P	1-7	(Italy) Alessandro Santin	1-7
78	(Italy) Brixia Corse	Alfa Romeo 75 Turbo	2	P	1-7	(Italy) Giacomo Bossini	5
79	(Italy) Albatech	Alfa Romeo 75 Turbo	2	P	1-7	(Italy) Walter Voulaz	1-4
79	(Italy) Albatech	Alfa Romeo 75 Turbo	2	P	1-7	(Italy) Marcello Cipriani	1-4
79	(Italy) Albatech	Alfa Romeo 75 Turbo	2	P	1-7	(Italy) Alessandro Nannini	5
79	(Italy) Albatech	Alfa Romeo 75 Turbo	2	P	1-7	(Italy) Giorgio Francia	5-7
79	(Italy) Albatech	Alfa Romeo 75 Turbo	2	P	1-7	(France) Jean-Louis Schlesser	5
79	(Italy) Albatech	Alfa Romeo 75 Turbo	2	P	1-7	(Italy) Nicola Larini	6-7
80	(Sweden) Q-Racing	Alfa Romeo 75 Turbo	2	P	1-4, 6-7	(Sweden) Thomas Lindström	1-4, 6-7
80	(Sweden) Q-Racing	Alfa Romeo 75 Turbo	2	P	1-4, 6-7	(Sweden) Mikael Naebrink	1-4
80	(Sweden) Q-Racing	Alfa Romeo 75 Turbo	2	P	1-4, 6-7	(Sweden) Steven Andskär	6-7
100	(Italy) Alfa Corse (Belgium) Alfa Romeo Benelux (Italy) Scuderia Autolodi Corse S.r.l.	Alfa Romeo 33	1	P	3-11	(Italy) Carlo Brambilla	3-7
100	(Italy) Alfa Corse (Belgium) Alfa Romeo Benelux (Italy) Scuderia Autolodi Corse S.r.l.	Alfa Romeo 33	1	P	3-11	(Italy) Giovanni Maggiorelli	3
100	(Italy) Alfa Corse (Belgium) Alfa Romeo Benelux (Italy) Scuderia Autolodi Corse S.r.l.	Alfa Romeo 33	1	P	3-11	(Spain) Luis Villamil	4
100	(Italy) Alfa Corse (Belgium) Alfa Romeo Benelux (Italy) Scuderia Autolodi Corse S.r.l.	Alfa Romeo 33	1	P	3-11	(Belgium) Alain Thiebaut	5-7, 11
100	(Italy) Alfa Corse (Belgium) Alfa Romeo Benelux (Italy) Scuderia Autolodi Corse S.r.l.	Alfa Romeo 33	1	P	3-11	(Italy) Daniele Toffoli	5, 7-10
100	(Italy) Alfa Corse (Belgium) Alfa Romeo Benelux (Italy) Scuderia Autolodi Corse S.r.l.	Alfa Romeo 33	1	P	3-11	(Italy) Giorgio Francia	8-11

== Calendar ==
Drivers in Italics were listed as a driver in the car but did not actually drive that car in the race.

Round	Date	Country	Circuit, Event	Overall winner		Winner championship		Report
Round	Date	Country	Circuit, Event	#	Driver - Laps / Car	#	Driver - Laps, overall position	Report
1	22 March	Italy	Monza; Monza 500	5	(Canada) Allan Moffat (Australia) John Harvey; 86 laps / Holden VL Commodore SS Group A	79	(Italy) Walter Voulaz (Italy) Marcello Cipriani; 79 laps, 7th / Alfa Romeo 75	Report
2	19 April	Spain	Jarama; Jarama 4 Hours	46	(Italy) Emanuele Pirro (Italy) Roberto Ravaglia (Austria) Roland Ratzenberger; 150 laps / BMW M3	46	(Italy) Emanuele Pirro (Italy) Roberto Ravaglia (Austria) Roland Ratzenberger; 150 laps / BMW M3	Report
3	10 May	France	Dijon; Burgundy 500	42	(Italy) Gianfranco Brancatelli (Venezuela) Johnny Cecotto; 112 laps / BMW M3	42	(Italy) Gianfranco Brancatelli (Venezuela) Johnny Cecotto; 112 laps / BMW M3	Report
4	12 July	Germany	Nürburgring; Nürburgring Touring Car Grand Prix	7	(West Germany) Klaus Ludwig (West Germany) Klaus Niedzwiedz (Belgium) Pierre Dieudonné * 111 laps / Ford Sierra RS Cosworth	7	(West Germany) Klaus Ludwig (West Germany) Klaus Niedzwiedz (Belgium) Pierre Dieudonné * 111 laps / Ford Sierra RS Cosworth	Report
5	1-August 2	Belgium	Spa-Francorchamps; Spa 24 Hours	48	(Belgium) Eric van de Poele (Belgium) Jean-Michel Martin (Belgium) Didier Theys; 481 laps / BMW M3	43	(Spain) Luis Pérez-Sala (France) Olivier Grouillard (West Germany) Winfried Vogt; 473 laps, Runner-up / BMW M3	Report
6	16 August	(Czech Republic) Czechoslovakia	Brno; Grand Prix Brno	7	(West Germany) Klaus Ludwig (West Germany) Klaus Niedzwiedz; 93 laps / Ford Sierra RS500	7	(West Germany) Klaus Ludwig (West Germany) Klaus Niedzwiedz; 93 laps / Ford Sierra RS500	Report
7	6 September	United Kingdom	Silverstone; RAC Tourist Trophy	48	(Switzerland) Enzo Calderari (Italy) Fabio Mancini; 105 laps / BMW M3	46	(Italy) Emanuele Pirro (Italy) Roberto Ravaglia (Austria) Roland Ratzenberger * 105 laps, Runner-up / BMW M3	Report
8	4 October	Australia	Mount Panorama; Bathurst 1000	10	(Australia) Peter McLeod (Australia) Peter Brock (Australia) David Parsons (Australia) Jon Crooke * 158 laps / Holden VL Commodore SS Group A	42	(Italy) Gianfranco Brancatelli (Venezuela) Johnny Cecotto; 154 laps / 7th / BMW M3	Report
9	11 October	Australia	Calder Park; Calder 500	6	(United Kingdom) Steve Soper (Belgium) Pierre Dieudonné (West Germany) Klaus Niedzwiedz * 120 laps / Ford Sierra RS500	6	(United Kingdom) Steve Soper (Belgium) Pierre Dieudonné (West Germany) Klaus Niedzwiedz * 120 laps / Ford Sierra RS500	Report
10	26 October	New Zealand	Wellington; Wellington 500	7	(West Germany) Klaus Ludwig (West Germany) Klaus Niedzwiedz; 150 laps / Ford Sierra RS500	7	(West Germany) Klaus Ludwig (West Germany) Klaus Niedzwiedz; 150 laps / Ford Sierra RS500	Report
11	15 November	Japan	Fuji; InterTEC 500	6	(West Germany) Klaus Ludwig (West Germany) Klaus Niedzwiedz; 112 laps / Ford Sierra RS500	6	(West Germany) Klaus Ludwig (West Germany) Klaus Niedzwiedz; 112 laps / Ford Sierra RS500	Report

Note: "Overall winner" in the above table refers to the overall race winner and "Winner championship" refers to the highest placed entry which had been registered for the championship.

== Results and standings ==
=== Standings ===
==== Drivers' Championship ====
Pos	Driver	Car	(Italy) ITA	(Spain) SPA	(France) FRA	(West Germany) GER	(Belgium) BEL	(Czechoslovakia) CZE	(United Kingdom) GBR	(Australia) MPC	(Australia) CPR	(New Zealand) NZL	(Japan) JAP	Points
1	(Italy) Roberto Ravaglia	BMW M3	DSQ	1	Ret	2	Ret	4	1	3	2	2	2	269
2	(Germany) Klaus Ludwig	Ford Sierra RS Cosworth; Ford Sierra RS500	DNS	4	4	1	Ret	1	4	DSQ	5	1	1	268
2	(Germany) Klaus Niedzwiedz	Ford Sierra RS Cosworth; Ford Sierra RS500	DNS	5	3	1	Ret	1	4	DSQ	5	1	1	268
4	(Italy) Emanuele Pirro	BMW M3	DSQ	1	Ret	2	Ret	Ret	1	3	2	2	2	244
5	(Belgium) Pierre Dieudonné	Ford Sierra RS Cosworth; Ford Sierra RS500	DNS	4	4	Ret	Ret	2	7	DSQ	1	3	4	193
5	(United Kingdom) Steve Soper	Ford Sierra RS Cosworth; Ford Sierra RS500	DNS	5	3	Ret	Ret	2	7	DSQ	1	3	4	193
7	(France) Olivier Grouillard	BMW M3	DSQ	3		4	1	3	Ret	2		Ret	6	164
8	(Venezuela) Johnny Cecotto	BMW M3	DSQ	6	1	Ret	Ret	5	Ret	1	4	Ret	5	158
8	(Italy) Gianfranco Brancatelli	BMW M3		6	1	Ret	Ret	5	Ret	1	4	Ret	5	158
10	(Austria) Roland Ratzenberger	BMW M3	DSQ	2	Ret	3	6	4	Ret	Ret	3	4		146
11	(Spain) Luis Pérez-Sala	BMW M3	DSQ	3		4	1	3	Ret				6	134
12	(Italy) Giorgio Francia	Alfa Romeo 75 Turbo; Alfa Romeo 33	Ret	Ret	6	7	5	Ret	2	Ret	6	5		130
13	(Germany) Markus Oestreich	BMW M3	DSQ		Ret	3	6	Ret	Ret	Ret	3	4	3	118
14	(Italy) Daniele Toffoli	Alfa Romeo 33					Ret		9	Ret	6	5	8	99
15	(Italy) Walter Voulaz	Alfa Romeo 75 Turbo	1	7	10	Ret	4	9	8					94
15	(Italy) Marcello Cipriani	Alfa Romeo 75 Turbo	1	7	10	Ret	4	9	8					94
17	(France) Jacques Laffite	Alfa Romeo 75 Turbo		10	7	6	3	8	5					86
18	(Italy) Carlo Rossi	Alfa Romeo 75 Turbo	2	Ret	9	9	Ret	7	3					80
18	(Italy) Alessandro Santin	Alfa Romeo 75 Turbo	2	Ret	9	9	Ret	7	3					80
20	(Germany) Armin Hahne	Maserati Biturbo; Ford Sierra RS500	4	DNQ	Ret	Ret	Ret	11	6	Ret	Ret		7	79
21	(Germany) Winni Vogt	BMW M3	DSQ		Ret		1			2	Ret	Ret		70
22	(Italy) Paolo Barilla	Alfa Romeo 75 Turbo	Ret	Ret		6	3	8	5					67
23	(Italy) Ivan Capelli	BMW M3	DSQ	2	2		Ret							60
24	(Italy) Alessandro Nannini	Alfa Romeo 75 Turbo	3	10	7		5							59
25	(United Kingdom) Andy Rouse	Ford Sierra RS Cosworth; Ford Sierra RS500	Ret	8	5	5		Ret	Ret	Ret	Ret			58
25	(Belgium) Thierry Tassin	Ford Sierra RS Cosworth; Ford Sierra RS500	Ret	8	5	5		Ret	Ret	Ret	Ret			58
27	(Italy) Rinaldo Drovandi	Alfa Romeo 75 Turbo		Ret	8	8	2	10	Ret					54
27	(France) Jean-Louis Schlesser	Alfa Romeo 75 Turbo			6	7	3							54
29	(France) Alain Thiebaut	Alfa Romeo 33					Ret		9				8	45
30	(Italy) Gabriele Tarquini	Alfa Romeo 75 Turbo		Ret		8	2	10	Ret					43
31	(Italy) Bruno Giacomelli	Maserati Biturbo	4	DNQ	Ret	Ret	Ret	11		DNQ				42
31	(Italy) Marcello Gunella	Maserati Biturbo	4			Ret		11						42
33	(Italy) Claudio Langes	Alfa Romeo 75 Turbo			8		2							41
34	(Austria) Dieter Quester	BMW M3					6						3	39
35	(Germany) Altfrid Heger	BMW M3	DSQ							2	Ret			30
35	(Italy) Nicola Larini	Alfa Romeo 75 Turbo						Ret	2					30
35	(Sweden) Thomas Lindström	Alfa Romeo 75 Turbo		9	12	10	Ret	6	DNS					30
38	(United States) Michael Andretti	Alfa Romeo 75 Turbo	3											24
39	(Italy) Carlo Brambilla	Alfa Romeo 33		Ret			Ret		9					22
39	(Italy) Massimo Siena	Alfa Romeo 75 Turbo					4							22
41	(Switzerland) Mario Hytten	Maserati Biturbo							6					21
41	(Italy) Nicola Tesini	Maserati Biturbo							6					21
43	(Sweden) Steven Andskär	Alfa Romeo 75 Turbo					Ret	6	DNS					16
43	(Germany) Bernd Schneider	Ford Sierra RS500											7	16
44	(Sweden) Mikael Naebrink	Alfa Romeo 75 Turbo		9	12	10	Ret							14
45	(Belgium) Bruno di Gioia	Alfa Romeo 75 Turbo			11									3
45	(France) Gerard Févrot	Alfa Romeo 75 Turbo			11									3

Colour	Result
Gold	Winner
Silver	Second place
Bronze	Third place
Green	Points classification
Blue	Non-points classification
Blue	Non-classified finish (NC)
Purple	Retired, not classified (Ret)
Red	Did not qualify (DNQ)
Red	Did not pre-qualify (DNPQ)
Black	Disqualified (DSQ)
White	Did not start (DNS)
White	Withdrew (WD)
White	Race cancelled (C)
Blank	Did not practice (DNP)
Blank	Did not arrive (DNA)
Blank	Excluded (EX)

Note: Race placings in the above table refer to the relative placings gained by registered championship entries and does not include other competitors.

Point system: 20-15-12-10-8-6-4-3-2-1 awarded to the top ten finishers for both outright and divisional results. Therefore, a driver could be awarded up to 40 points in a race. Points were only allocated to drivers of cars registered for the World Championship.

==== Entrants Championship ====
Position	Entrant	Division	Rd 1	Rd 2	Rd 3	Rd 4	Rd 5	Rd 6	Rd 7	Rd 8	Rd 9	Rd 10	Rd 11	Total
1	(Switzerland) Eggenberger Texaco Ford No 7	3	-	30	25	40	-	40	30	-	23	40	25	253
2	(Germany) Schnitzer BMW M3 No 46	2	-	40	-	27	12	25	40	-	35	35	35	249
3	(Switzerland) Eggenberger Texaco Ford No 6	2	-	23	32	-	-	30	16	-	40	27	40	208
4	(Germany) Schnitzer BMW M3 No 40	3	-	30	30	35	-	-	-	24	27	25	27	198
5	(Italy) Bigazzi BMW M3 No 43	2	-	24	-	22	40	32	-	30	-	-	16	164
6	(Italy) CiBiEmme Sport BMW M3 No 42	2	-	16	40	-	-	20	-	40	22	-	20	158

Point system: 20-15-12-10-8-6-4-3-2-1 awarded to the top ten finishers for both outright and divisional results. Therefore, an entry could be awarded up to 40 points in a race. Points were allocated only to entries which were registered for the World Championship.

== See also ==
- Group A

== Bibliography ==
- Robert Weber (March 2017). Automobilsport Racing / History / Passion #11: World Touring Car Championship 1987. Sportfahrer Verlag. ISSN 2199-126X.
