= Nicola Tesini =

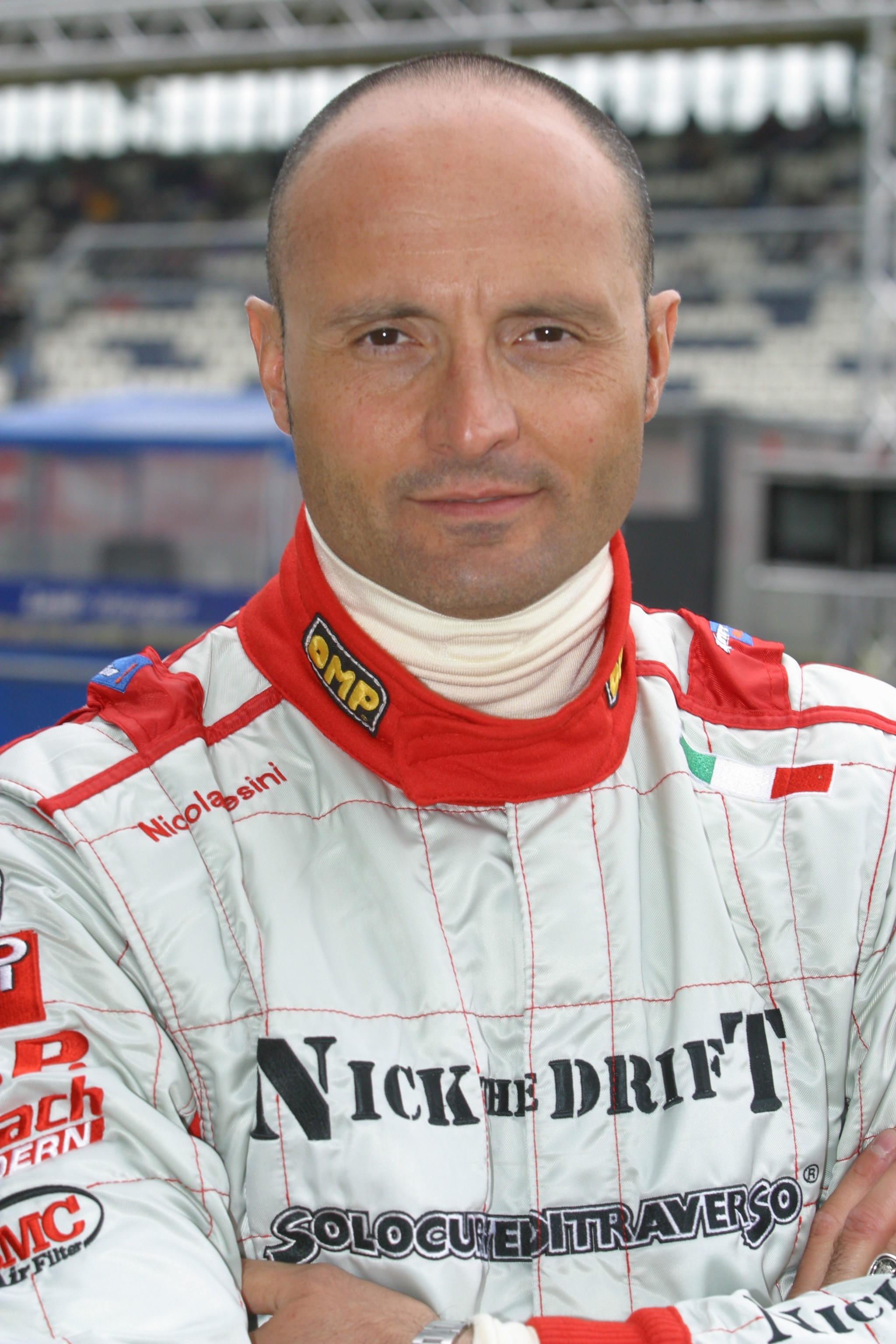
- Born: Nicola Tesini; April 19, 1962 (age 64); Verona, Italy
- Occupations: race car driver, journalist, promoter of motor events, driving instructor

Nicola Tesini (born April 19, 1962) is an Italian race car driver and journalist, a promoter of motor events and a driving instructor.

Son of Danilo Tesini – Tazio Nuvolari's mechanic, racer and builder of Sport cars – he started his career in 1982 in the Avon challenge of Formula Italia.

In 1984, Tesini was second in the Italian championship Formula 2000 at the wheel of the Alba-Alfa Romeo of Formula 3 with a record of four winnings in sequence.

In 1985 and 1986, Tesini joined the Italian Formula 3 championship on a Dallara 385 and still in 1986 he made his debut in the last two races of the European championship of Formula 3000, in Le Mans (France) and Jarama (Spain), driving the team Coloni's March Ford Cosworth.

The following year, in 1987, Tesini joined the official team Maserati Proteam as a tester and a racer in the WTCC tourism world championship, driving the Maserati Biturbo

Once he gave up the competitive activity at the end of 1987, Tesini became a tester and a journalist for some Italian car magazines.

Still as a journalist, Tesini competed in the champions' race of Formula 1 in 1999 in Magny Cours on cars by F.France, in two of the Andros Trophy ice racing (in 1995 and 2000 for Citroen), in a trial of the Italian Superstar championship 2004 (2nd absolute in Imola on BMW M5) and in the two editions of the 24 Hours of Nürburgring in 2004 and 2005 on Seat Leon TDi.

In 2004, Tesini founded the SCDT, officially importing in Italy the discipline of Drifting. By this structure he achieved two international records: the regulation of the speciality under the aegis of FIA (2007) and the introduction in 2010 of a revolutionary telemetric system of data transfer (Spydrift), which can read every single moment and every single movement of the drifter and of his car.

In 2005, on the English circuit of Silverstone, Tesini met the Japanese pilot who gave birth to the discipline of Drifting: "Drift King" Keiichi Tsuchiya.

Since 2006, Tesini is the promoter of the national series SuperDrift Professional Challenge and the coordinator of the first Italian school of Drifting Drift Fun Day, born in 2004 and then supported by the SuperCarControl, the first international tutoring-school with personal-trainer Nicola Tesini, devoted to the driving of Grand Touring and road Supercars.

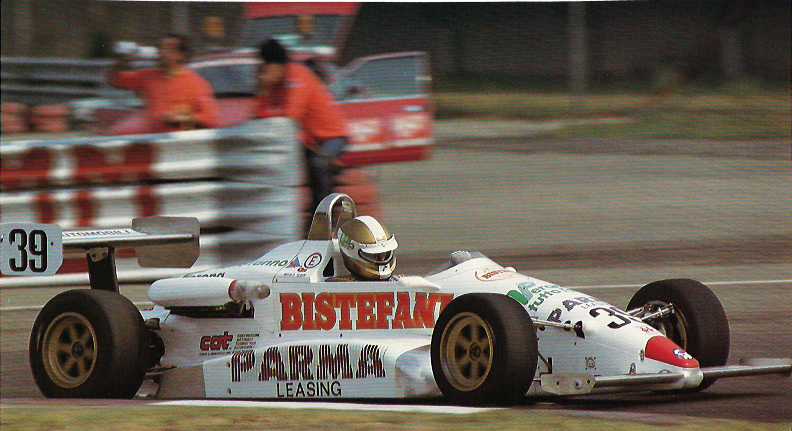

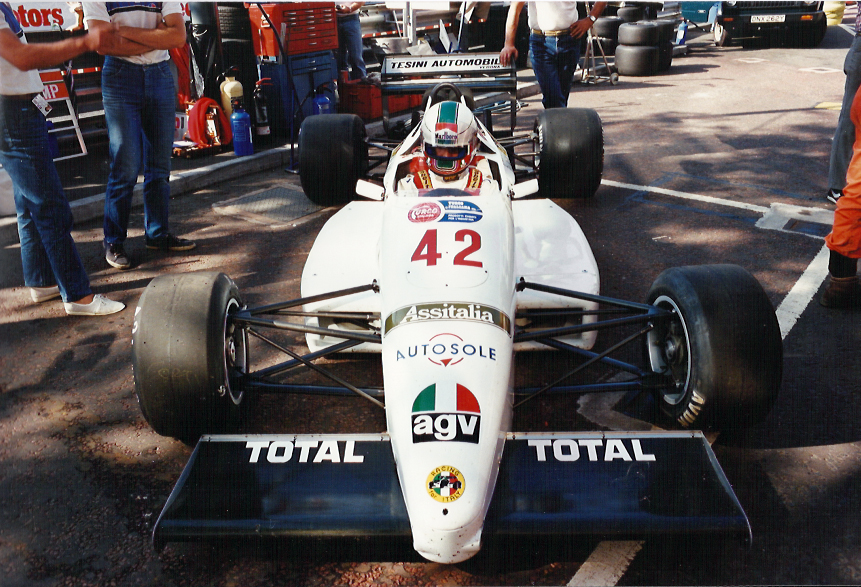

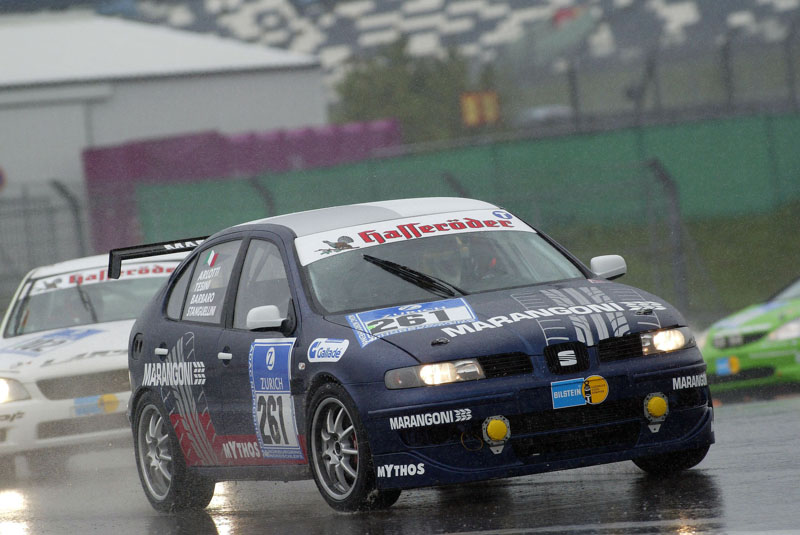

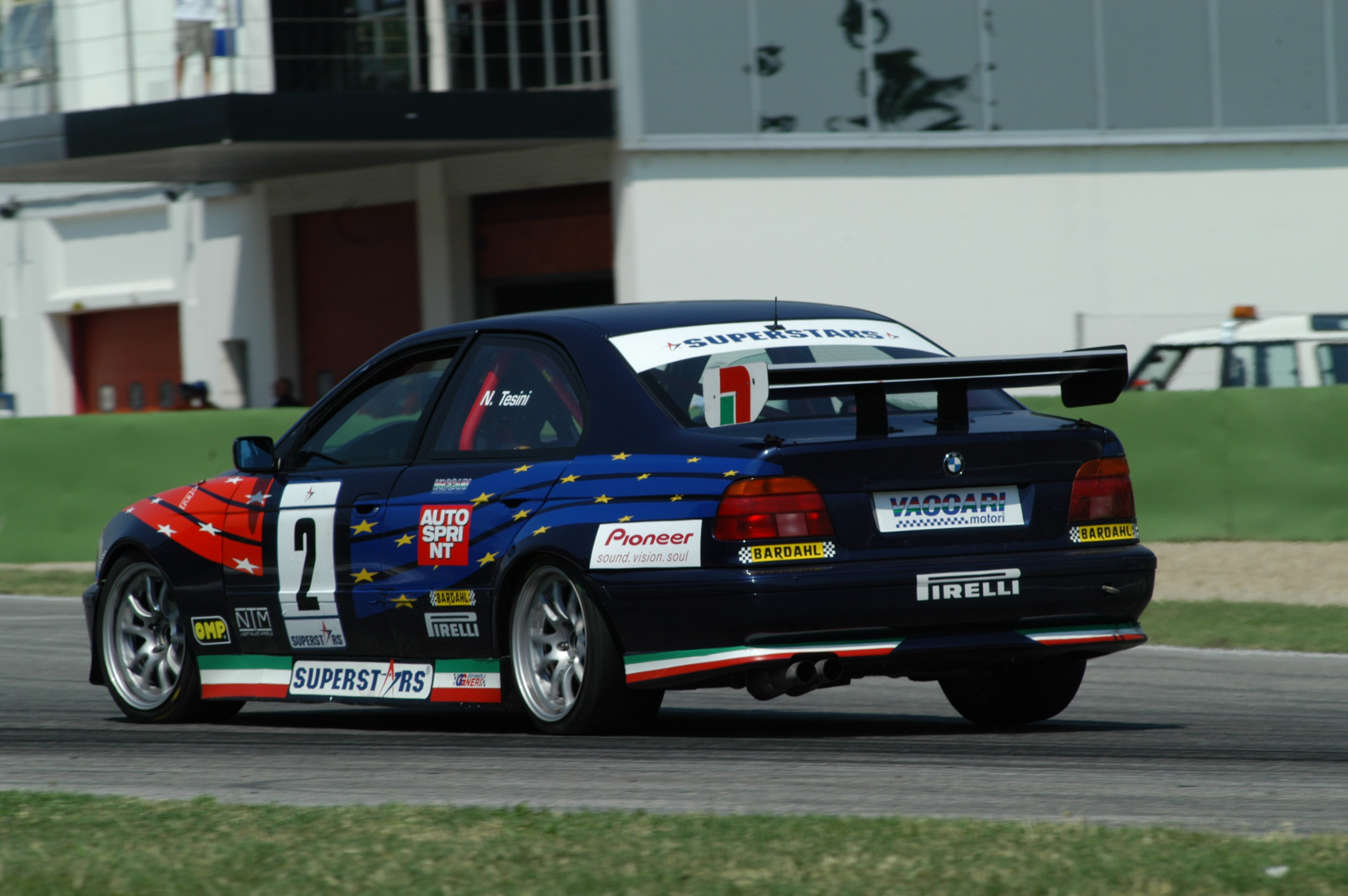

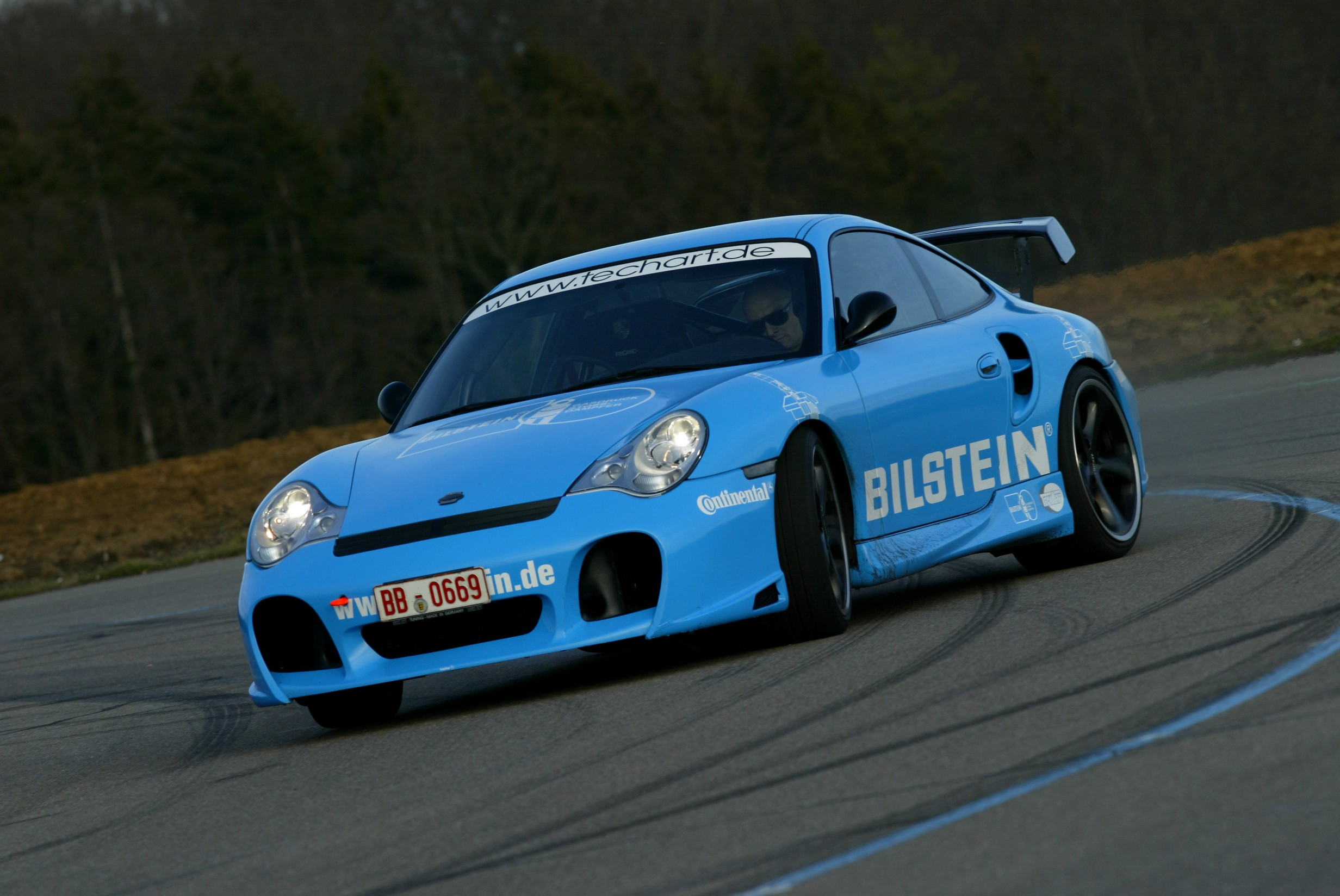

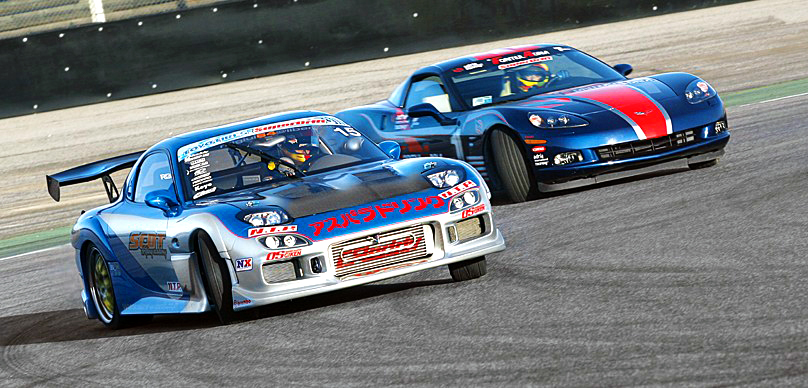

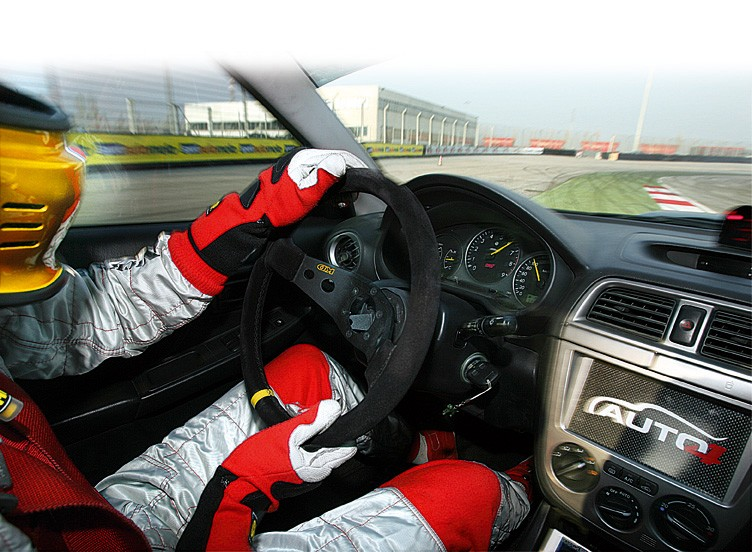

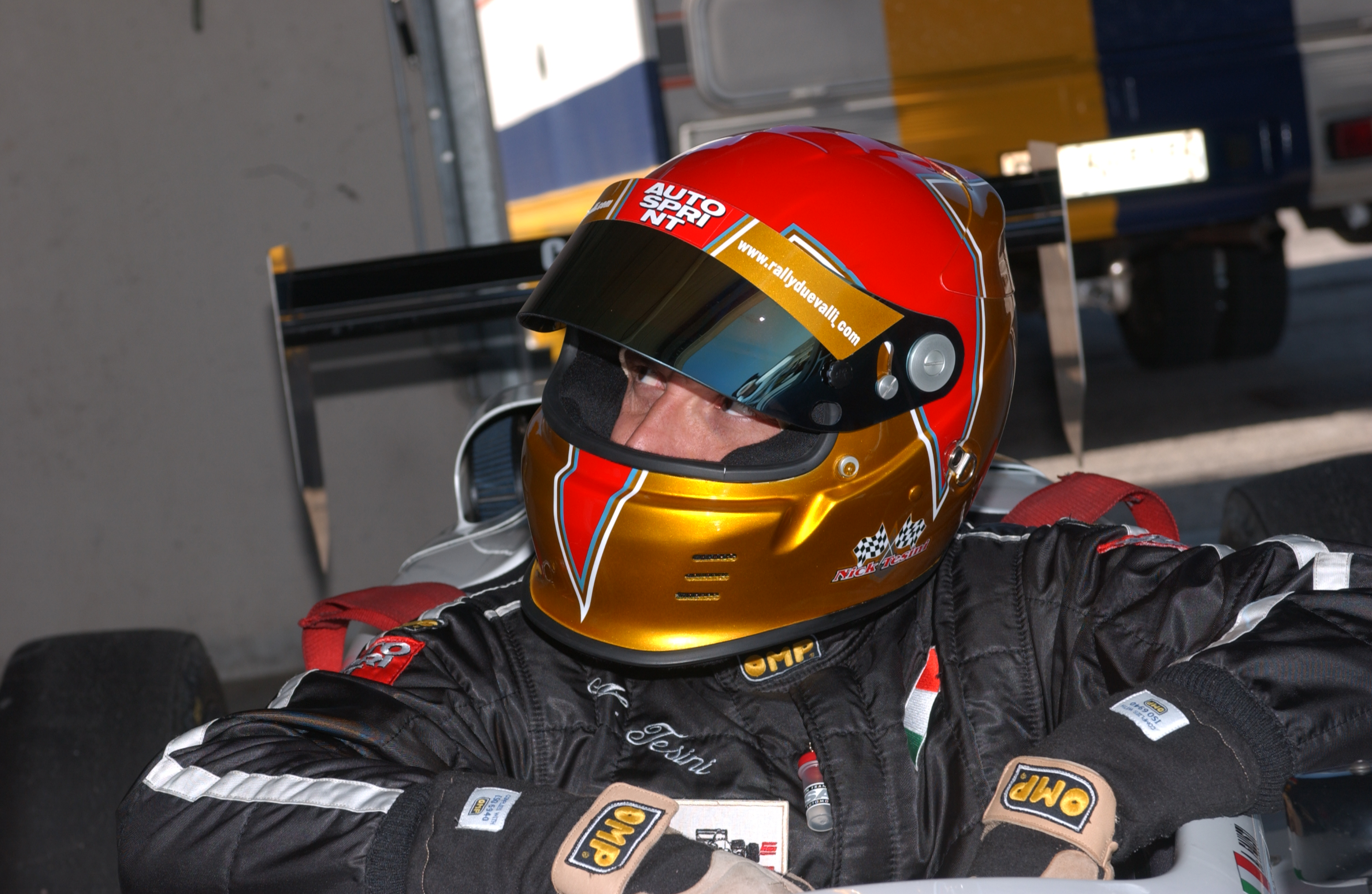
