= Annette Meeuvissen =

German touring car driver

Annette Meeuvissen (born 12 April 1962 in Düsseldorf; died 5 December 2004 in Berg) was a German racecar driver.

== Career ==
Annette Meeuvissen began her motorsport career in slalom in 1980. In 1982, she drove a Ford Fiesta XR2 in the newly founded Ford Fiesta Ladies Cup. After winning the opening race in Wunstorf, she was tied on points with Delia Stegemann for first place after the six races of the season. However, as Stegemann had one more win to her name, she was declared champion.

In the 1985 season, she drove for the Ford Gerstmann Racing Team in the 1st Division of the European Touring Car Championship. Together with Jörg van Ommen, she achieved two placings in a Ford Escort RS1600i

A year later, she drove in the Porsche 944 Turbo Cup, which was held for the first time.

In 1987, she switched back to touring car racing and competed together with Mercedes Stermitz for the BMW Schnitzer Team in the 2nd division of the World Touring Car Championship. At the 24-hour race at Spa-Francorchamps and the 500-km race at Calder, both finished seventh in the BMW M3. In the European Touring Car Championship, both drivers only raced in the 500-km race at Zeltweg and also finished seventh there.

From 1988 to 1991, Meeuvissen competed in the German Touring Car Championship (DTM). She achieved her best result of the season in her first DTM year with 31st place and 18 points. She achieved her greatest racing success - an eleventh place - in the 1990 in the BMW M3 Sport Evolution of the Zakspeed team at the AVUS race.

In 1992, she drove in the German Touring Car Trophy (DTT) Together with Heiner Weis and Marc Gindorf, she competed once again in the 24 Hours of Spa-Francorchamps in a BMW M3 Sport Evolution in the A2 class.5 and finished the race in 17th place. After the 1992 season, she ended her motorsport career and worked as a driving instructor for BMW.

In Namibia, she opened a farm for homeless and injured animals. She returned to Germany in 1995 and worked as a flight attendant from 1996 to 2002. However, she had to give up her training as a nursery school teacher at the beginning of 2004 due to her cancer illness. Meeuvissen finally died on 5 December 2004 as a result of her serious illness.
