= Mercedes Stermitz =

Austrian racing driver (born 1958)

- Nationality: (Austria) Austrian
- Born: 24 April 1958 (age 68) Styria, Austria

Mercedes Otto-Stermitz (born 24 April 1958) is an Austrian racing driver and beauty pageant titleholder who won Miss Austria 1983 and represented her country at Miss World 1983.

== Life and career ==
Stermitz worked as a stewardess at Austrian Airlines and then as a model when she was elected Miss Austria in 1983. She later was a Top 15 semi-finalist at Miss World 1983 and a Top 10 semi-finalist at Miss Europe 1984. Stermitz also competed in Miss Universe 1983 but did not place. At the same time, she started motorsport and, supported by Helmut Marko, drove a number of races in Austria in an Alfa Romeo GTV. In 1985 and 1986, she started in the Ford Fiesta Ladies Cup.

In 1987, Stermitz received a works contract with the BMW Schnitzer Team and, together with her teammate Annette Meeuvissen, competed in a BMW M3 in the 2nd division of the World Touring Car Championship. Both of them finished seventh in the Spa-Francorchamps 24-hour race and the 500 km race in Calder. In the same year, both started in the 500 km race in Zeltweg, which was part of the European Touring Car Championship, and also achieved seventh place there. For the 1988 season, she moved to BMW M Team Linder in the Deutsche Tourenwagen Meisterschaft (DTM) and finished in 37th place in the overall standings. In 1989 and 1990, she drove in the Porsche one-make cups Porsche 944 Turbo Cup and the successor Porsche Carrera Cup Germany. In 1990 and 1991, she took part in some races for the World Sports Prototype Championship and World Sportscar Championship. There, she achieved eighth place together with Otto Rensing at the 1991 race at the Nürburgring in a Porsche 962 CK6 from the Porsche Kremer Racing team.

In parallel to touring car racing, Stermitz also started, but without much success, in formula racing. In 1987, 1988, 1990 and 1992, she drove with various racing teams in the German Formula Three Championship. In 1991, she competed in a race in the British Formula 3000 Championship and in 1992 in the Buenos Aires Grand Prix – World Cup Formula 3000.

After a serious traffic accident in 1993, Stermitz had to end her motorsport career. She is married and has a daughter and a son.

Awards and achievements
Preceded by (Styria) Elisabeth Kawan	Miss Austria; 1983	Succeeded by (Vorarlberg) Michaela Nußbaumer
Preceded by (Styria) Elisabeth Kawan	Miss Universe Austria; 1983	Succeeded by (Vorarlberg) Michaela Nußbaumer
Preceded by (Vorarlberg) Beatrix Kopf	Miss World Austria; 1983	Succeeded by (Upper Austria) Heidemarie Pilgerstorfer
Preceded by Karin Stocklitsch	Miss Europe Austria; 1984	Succeeded by Petra Matsch
