= World Touring Car Championship =

Worldwide auto racing championship

- Category: Touring cars
- Country: International
- Inaugural season: 1987
- Folded: 2017
- Tyre suppliers: Yokohama
- Last Drivers' champion: (Sweden) Thed Björk
- Last Makes' champion: (Sweden) Volvo

The FIA World Touring Car Championship was an international touring car championship promoted by Eurosport Events and sanctioned by the Fédération Internationale de l'Automobile (FIA). It has had several different iterations, including a single season in 1987 as the World Touring Car Championship and most recently a world championship (WTCC) that has run between 2005 and 2017. Following the 2017 season, an agreement was reached for the FIA WTCC to become FIA WTCR and use the TCR technical regulations.

== History ==
=== First season ===
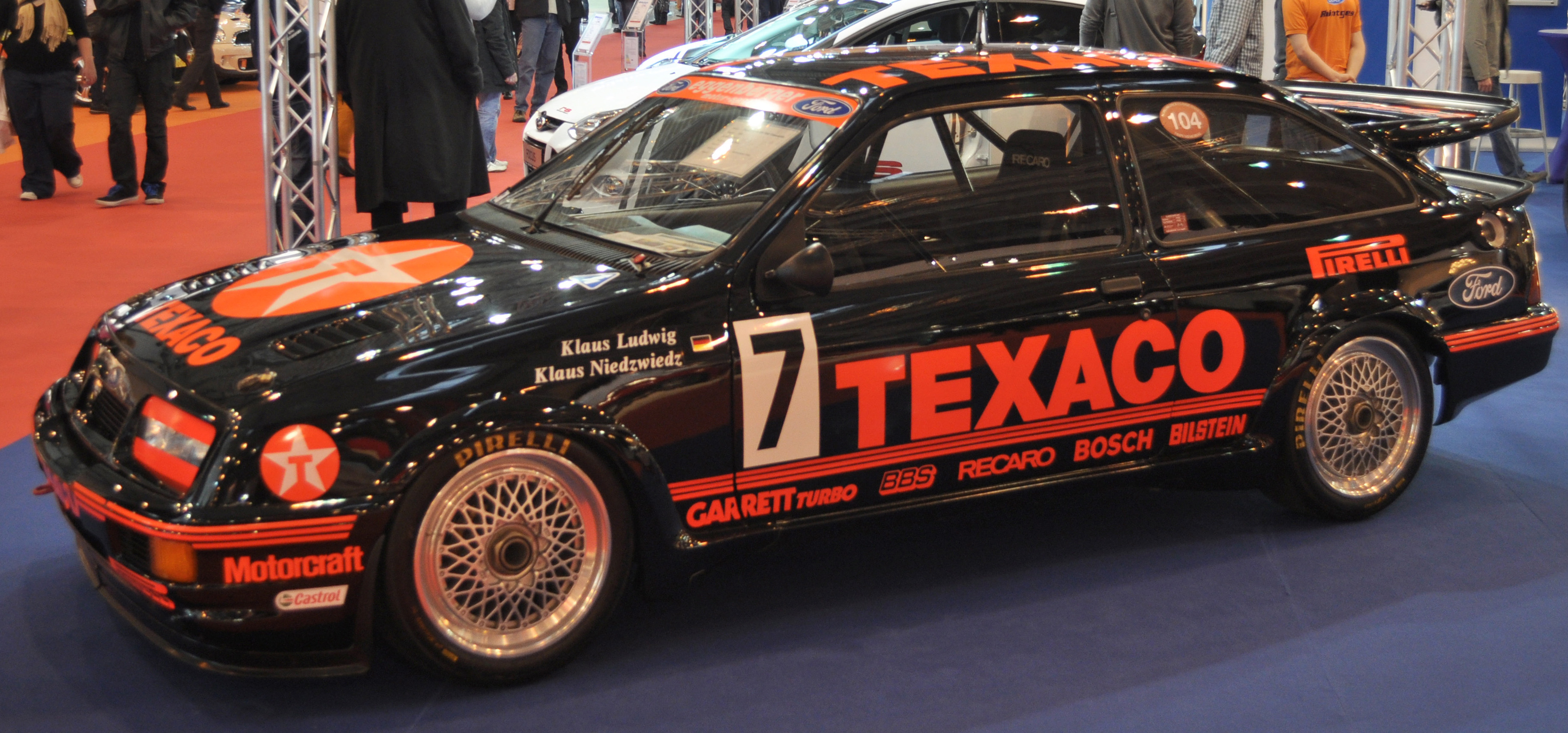
Eggenberger Motorsport Ford Sierra RS500 of Klaus Ludwig and Klaus Niedzwiedz

The first World Touring Car Championship, which was open to Group A Touring Cars, was held in 1987 concurrent to the long-running European Touring Car Championship (ETCC). Additional rounds were held outside Europe at Bathurst and Calder Park Raceway in Australia (Calder used a combined circuit of the road course and the then newly constructed NASCAR speedway), Wellington in New Zealand and Mount Fuji in Japan. The Championship was well-supported by the factory European teams of Ford, BMW, Maserati and Alfa Romeo (until Alfa withdrew following the European races), but was embroiled in controversy. Unfortunately, the leading BMW Motorsport teams and the Ford Europe-backed Eggenberger Motorsport had developed a situation of "you don't protest us, we won't protest you". While this worked well in the European races, when the championship landed in Australia the local teams took exception to the Europeans' somewhat liberal interpretation of the Group A rules. Subsequently, the Eggenberger cars were protested against and eventually disqualified from the Bathurst 1000 results.

The championship was provisionally awarded to West German Eggenberger Ford Sierra RS500 drivers Klaus Ludwig and Klaus Niedzwiedz. It was not until March 1988 when their Bathurst disqualification was finalised that results were confirmed and Italian Schnitzer Motorsport driver Roberto Ravaglia in a BMW M3 was declared the champion. The Entrants Championship was won by the Eggenberger Texaco Ford No 7 entry. The WTCC lasted only one year and was a victim of its own success — the FIA (and Bernie Ecclestone) feared it would take money away from Formula One and stopped sanctioning the Championship. A silhouette formula championship (proposed by Ecclestone) was announced by the FIA for 1988 which would have seen specialist racing chassis carrying bodywork resembling production roadcars powered by the about to be outlawed Formula One 1.5 litre turbo regulations, but manufacturers did not support the concept. Only one car, based on an Alfa Romeo 164 with a 3.5 litre V10 engine was built before the idea was abandoned.

=== European Touring Car Championship ===
In 2001, the European Touring Car Championship (ETCC) was resumed with support from the FIA, the precursor to the current WTCC. In 2001, the Italian Superturismo Championship became the FIA European Super Touring Championship, with an extra class for Super Production cars alongside the main Super Touring class. In 2002, this evolved into the brand new FIA European Touring Car Championship, using Super 2000 rules, dominated by Alfa Romeo and BMW, but popular with the public due to the intense competition and Eurosport live broadcasts.

=== Return to World Championship status ===
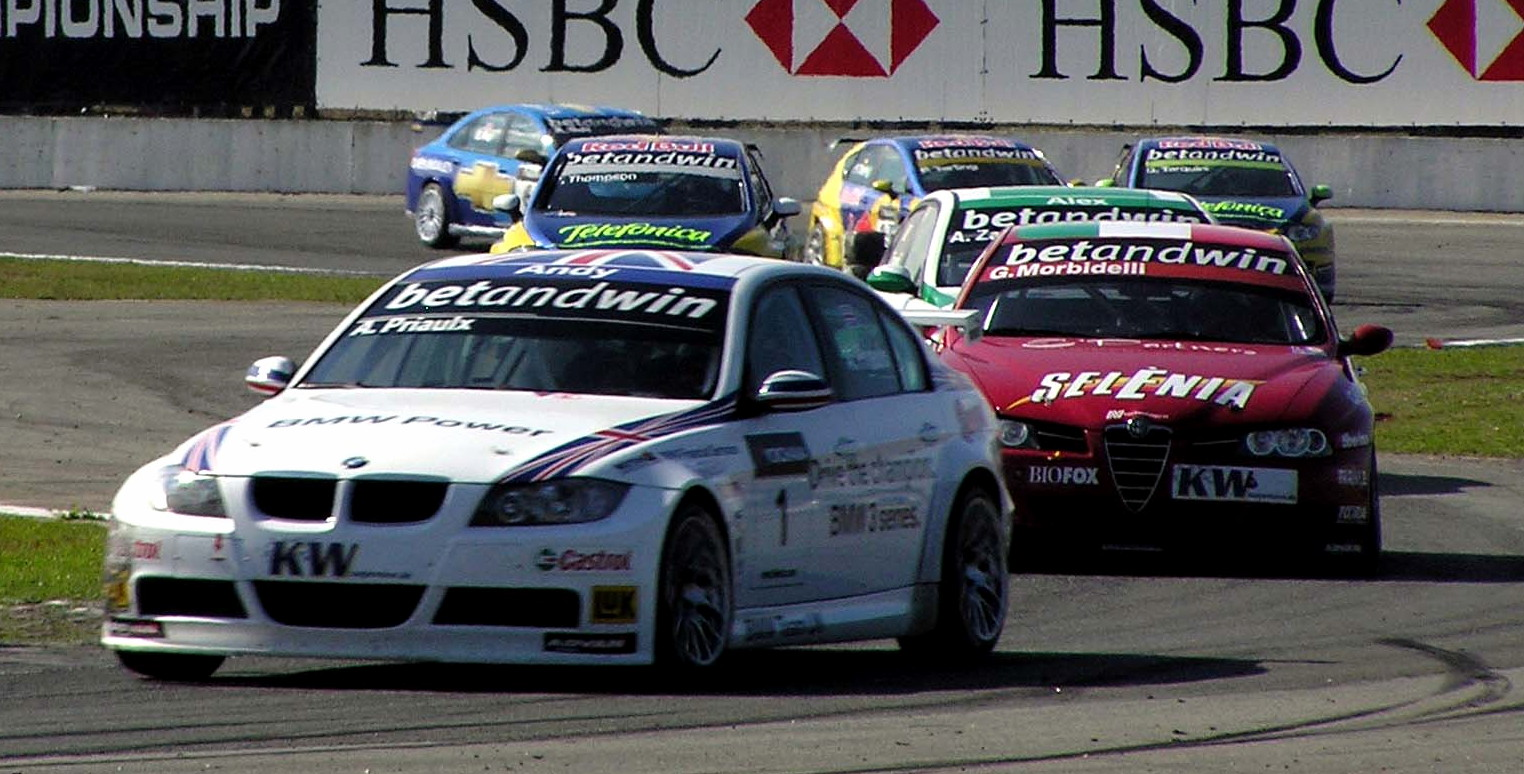
Factory-backed BMW 320si, Alfa Romeo 156, SEAT León, and Chevrolet Lacetti in the 2006 season.

At the request of interested manufacturers, the ETCC was changed to the current WTCC beginning with the 2005 season, continuing to use Super 2000 and Diesel 2000 regulations. 2004 ETCC Champion Andy Priaulx and his BMW 320i were the dominant driver-car pairing during the first three years of the revived championship, winning the 2005, 2006 and 2007 Drivers and Manufacturers Championships.

In 2008, Frenchman Yvan Muller won the title after Race 1 in Macau in his SEAT León TDI. This marked the first time an FIA sanctioned world championship, in any category, being won by a diesel powered racing car. SEAT León TDI won both championships for a second time in 2009, this time in the hands of Gabriele Tarquini.

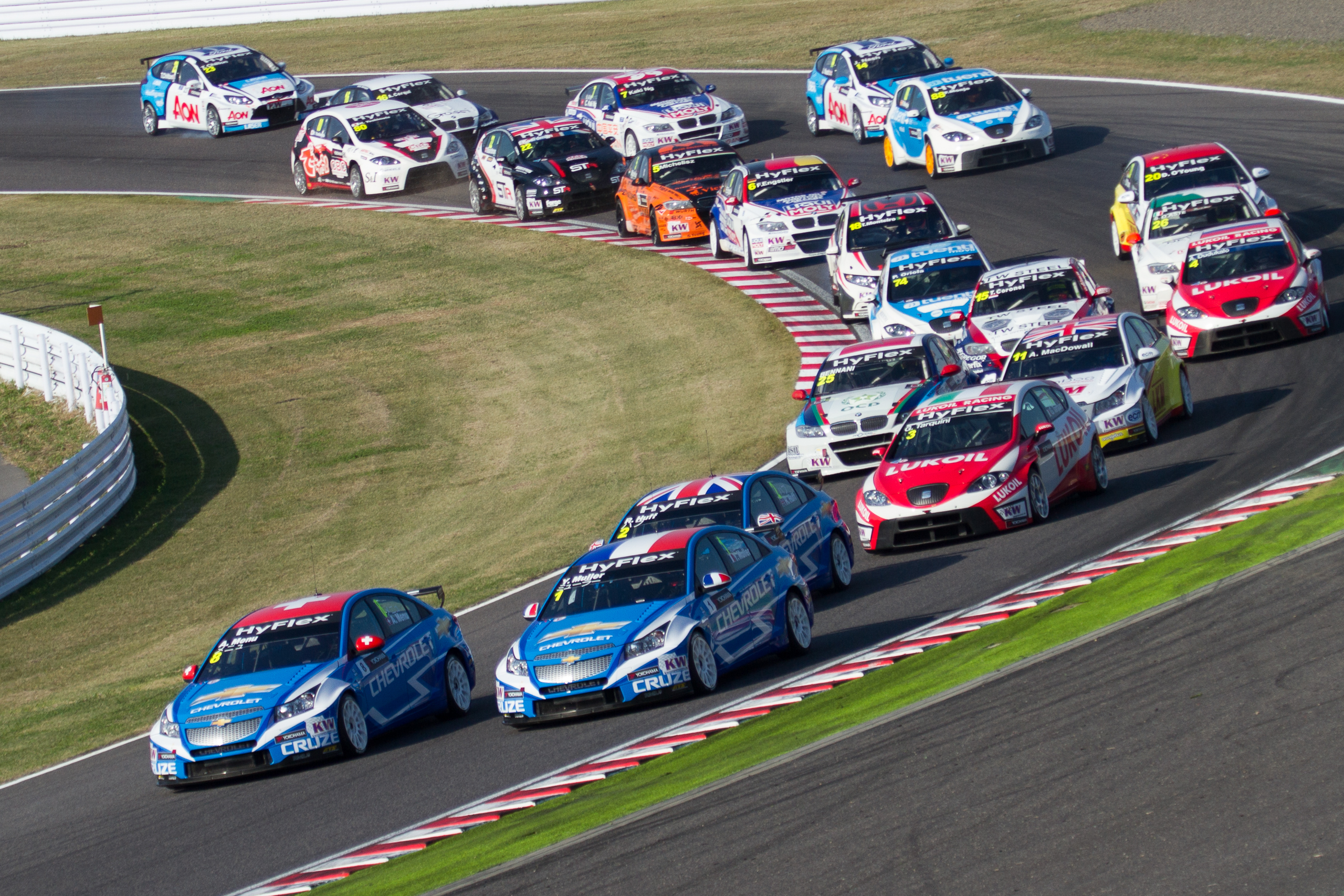
Race start at the 2012 FIA WTCC Race of Japan.

2010 marked the start of Chevrolet's dominance of the championship with its Cruze model. Frenchman Yvan Muller became World Champion, fending off tough competition from Gabriele Tarquini and Andy Priaulx to win the first world championship for Chevrolet. Muller continued his success into 2011, winning both drivers championship and helping Chevrolet to its second manufacturers championship after Muller's two teammates finished second and third in the drivers standings. This gave Chevrolet a clean sweep of both titles. The 2012 championship saw Chevrolet pick up where they left off in 2011, leading to a second year of championship clean sweeps, this time with Rob Huff taking the drivers title.

The modern series has held events based all around the world including races in Argentina, Morocco, Hungary, Germany, Russia, France, Portugal, Slovakia, Czech Republic, Japan, China, Thailand and Qatar with former races in Brazil, Great Britain, Italy, Macau, Netherlands, Spain, Sweden, Turkey and the United States.

Technical rules were modified in 2011 to allow 1.6L turbo gasoline engines, and the 2.0L gasoline and turbodiesel engines were outlawed in 2012. In 2014, new car regulations were introduced with the name TC1, with larger wings and more engine power. The old 1.6L turbo cars were renamed TC2 for a year and were dropped for 2015.

=== World Touring Car Cup ===
The series adopted TCR regulations and merged with the TCR International Series for 2018, with the new merged series being named World Touring Car Cup (WTCR). The WTCR lost the World Championship status of the WTCC as official factory teams were not allowed, though some drivers and teams received backing from manufacturers.

== Car regulations ==
The WTCC uses Super 2000 and Diesel 2000 cars, as cost control is a major theme in the technical regulation. Super 2000 engines are 1.6 L turbo-charged 4-cylinder engines producing approximately 380 bhp. Wheels are 18" in diameter, and large front and rear aerodynamic devices are permitted.

Many technologies that have featured in production cars are not allowed, including variable valve timing, variable intake geometry, ABS brakes and traction control system.

== Scoring system ==
=== Current scoring system ===
Currently, all WTCC races are awarded equal points. From 2010, these points have been based on the FIA's points system used in the FIA Formula One Championship and the FIA World Rally Championship.

Position	1st	2nd	3rd	4th	5th	6th	7th	8th	9th	10th
Points	25	18	15	12	10	8	6	4	2	1

=== Previous points systems ===
Between 2005 and 2009, the championship adopted the following points scoring system:

Position	1st	2nd	3rd	4th	5th	6th	7th	8th
Points	10	8	6	5	4	3	2	1

For the inaugural 1987 season, the championship used the following points scoring system:

Position	1st	2nd	3rd	4th	5th	6th	7th	8th	9th	10th
Points	20	15	12	10	6	5	4	3	2	1

== Champions ==
World Touring Car Champions and Independents' Trophy winners by season
Year	Drivers' Champion	Entrants' Champion	Independent Drivers' Trophy	Independent Teams' Trophy
1987	(Italy) Roberto Ravaglia	(Switzerland) Eggenberger Motorsport; No. 7	Not Held	Not Held
Year	Drivers' Champion	Manufacturers' Champion	Independent Drivers' Trophy	Independent Teams' Trophy
2005	(United Kingdom) Andy Priaulx	(Germany) BMW	(Germany) Marc Hennerici	(Italy) Proteam Motorsport
2006	(United Kingdom) Andy Priaulx	(Germany) BMW	(Netherlands) Tom Coronel	(Hong Kong) GR Asia
2007	(United Kingdom) Andy Priaulx	(Germany) BMW	(Italy) Stefano D'Aste	(Italy) Proteam Motorsport
2008	(France) Yvan Muller	(Spain) SEAT	(Spain) Sergio Hernández	(Italy) Proteam Motorsport
2009	(Italy) Gabriele Tarquini	(Spain) SEAT	(Netherlands) Tom Coronel	(Spain) SUNRED Engineering
2010	(France) Yvan Muller	(United States) Chevrolet	(Spain) Sergio Hernández	(Italy) Proteam Motorsport
2011	(France) Yvan Muller	(United States) Chevrolet	(Denmark) Kristian Poulsen	(Germany) Liqui Moly Team Engstler
2012	(United Kingdom) Robert Huff	(United States) Chevrolet	(Hungary) Norbert Michelisz	(Russia) Lukoil Racing Team
2013	(France) Yvan Muller	(Japan) Honda	(United Kingdom) James Nash	(United Kingdom) RML
2014	(Argentina) José María López	(France) Citroën	(Germany) Franz Engstler	(Italy) ROAL Motorsport
2015	(Argentina) José María López	(France) Citroën	(Hungary) Norbert Michelisz	(Italy) ROAL Motorsport
2016	(Argentina) José María López	(France) Citroën	(Morocco) Mehdi Bennani	(France) Sébastien Loeb Racing
2017	(Sweden) Thed Björk	(Sweden) Volvo	(United Kingdom) Tom Chilton	(France) Sébastien Loeb Racing

World Touring Car Champions by number of titles won
Drivers				Manufacturers			
Rank	Driver	Titles	Seasons	Rank	Manufacturer	Titles	Seasons
1st	(France) Yvan Muller	4	2008, 2010, 2011, 2013	1st	(Germany) BMW	3	2005, 2006, 2007
2nd	(United Kingdom) Andy Priaulx	3	2005, 2006, 2007	1st	(United States) Chevrolet	3	2010, 2011, 2012
2nd	(Argentina) José María López	3	2014, 2015, 2016	1st	(France) Citroën	3	2014, 2015, 2016
4th	(Italy) Gabriele Tarquini	1	2009	4th	(Spain) SEAT	2	2008, 2009
4th	(United Kingdom) Robert Huff	1	2012	5th	(Japan) Honda	1	2013
4th	(Sweden) Thed Björk	1	2017	5th	(Sweden) Volvo	1	2017

== Event winners ==
As per FIA WTCC all-time statistics on the official site of the WTCC.

Drivers
	Driver	Total
1	(France) Yvan Muller	48
2	(United Kingdom) Robert Huff	29
2	(Argentina) José María López	29
4	(Switzerland) Alain Menu	23
5	(Italy) Gabriele Tarquini	22
6	(United Kingdom) Andy Priaulx	18
7	(Brazil) Augusto Farfus	15
8	(Portugal) Tiago Monteiro	11
9	(Germany) Jörg Müller	10
10	(Hungary) Norbert Michelisz	8
11	(United Kingdom) Tom Chilton	7
12	(Morocco) Mehdi Bennani	6
12	(Netherlands) Tom Coronel	6
12	(France) Sébastien Loeb	6
15	(Sweden) Rickard Rydell	5
16	(Spain) Jordi Gené	4
16	(Italy) Fabrizio Giovanardi	4
16	(Germany) Dirk Müller	4
16	(United Kingdom) James Thompson	4
16	(Italy) Alessandro Zanardi	4
21	(Sweden) Thed Björk	3
21	(Argentina) Esteban Guerrieri	3
21	(Denmark) Michel Nykjær	3
24	(Netherlands) Nicky Catsburg	2
24	(Italy) Stefano D'Aste	2
24	(United Kingdom) James Nash	2
24	(Spain) Félix Porteiro	2
24	(China) Ma Qinghua	2
29	(France) Yann Ehrlacher	1
29	(Germany) Franz Engstler	1
29	(Argentina) Néstor Girolami	1
29	(Spain) Sergio Hernández	1
29	(Netherlands) Duncan Huisman	1
29	(Italy) Nicola Larini	1
29	(Italy) Gianni Morbidelli	1
29	(Spain) Pepe Oriola	1
29	(Italy) Salvatore Tavano	1
29	(Germany) Peter Terting	1
29	(United Kingdom) Colin Turkington	1

Manufacturers
	Manufacturer	Total
1	(United States) Chevrolet	88
2	(Germany) BMW	65
3	(France) Citroën	57
4	(Spain) SEAT	43
5	(Japan) Honda	20
6	(Italy) Alfa Romeo	15
7	(Russia) Lada	6
8	(Sweden) Volvo	5
8	(United States) Ford	5

Cars
	Car	Total
1	Citroën C-Elysée WTCC	57
2	Chevrolet Cruze 1.6T	55
3	BMW 320si	43
4	Honda Civic WTCC	19
5	SEAT León 2.0 TDI	17
6	Alfa Romeo 156	14
6	Chevrolet Lacetti	14
6	SEAT León TDI	14
9	Chevrolet Cruze LT	13
10	BMW 320i	9
11	BMW 320 TC	8
12	Chevrolet Cruze TC1	6
13	Volvo S60 WTCC	5
13	BMW M3	5
15	Lada Vesta WTCC	4
15	SEAT León	4
15	SEAT León WTCC	4
15	Ford Sierra RS500	4
19	SEAT Toledo Cupra	3
20	Lada Granta TC1	2
21	Honda Accord Euro R	1
21	SEAT León TFSI	1
21	Alfa Romeo 75	1
21	Ford Sierra RS Cosworth	1

== Manufacturer entries ==
The WTCC features entries with the backing, funding and technical support of a motor manufacturer. This can sometimes be a motor racing team running cars on behalf of the manufacturer or cars being run directly by the factory. Below is a timeline of manufacturer entries from the beginning of the championship in 2005.

Manufacturer entries
2005	2006	2007	2008	2009	2010	2011	2012	2013	2014	2015	2016	2017
Alfa Romeo												
BMW												
Chevrolet												
									Citroën			
Ford												
			Honda					Honda				
				Lada				Lada				
SEAT												
						Volvo					Volvo	
2005	2006	2007	2008	2009	2010	2011	2012	2013	2014	2015	2016	2017

== See also ==
- World Touring Car Cup
- European Touring Car Championship
- SEAT León Eurocup
- TCR International Series
- List of World Touring Car Championship drivers
