= Sandown 500 =

Signature event at Sandown Raceway

(Victoria (state)) Sandown 500
- Race Information
Venue	Sandown Raceway
Number of times held	51
First held	1964
- Race Format
- Race 1
Laps	79
Distance	250 km
- Race 2
Laps	79
Distance	250 km
- Last Event (2026)
- Overall Winner
(Australia) Matt Payne	Grove Racing
- Race Winners
(Australia) Brodie Kostecki	Dick Johnson Racing
(New Zealand) Matt Payne	Grove Racing

The Sandown 500 (commercially titled Penrite Oil Sandown 500) is an annual endurance motor race which is staged at the Sandown Raceway, in Melbourne, Victoria, Australia from 1964. The event's name, distance – and the category of cars competing in it – has varied widely throughout its history. Currently, the event is held as a championship event for Supercars.

Historically the event has been held in September, the month before Australia's premier endurance race, the Bathurst 1000, with a recent exception of the 2019 running, held in November. The event returned in September 2023 after a three-year hiatus.

== History ==
=== Production car era ===
The first two races were open to production based sedans and, at six hours duration, were substantially longer than later iterations of the race. Both races were won by an Alfa Romeo Giulia entered by Alec Mildren Racing. In 1965, Sandown also hosted the single-event Australian Touring Car Championship and hosted a regular sprint round from 1970 onwards. In 1968, after a two-year hiatus, the event was revived as a three-hour race and took on a long time role as an unofficial "warm-up" event for what was then the Bathurst 500. In common with the Bathurst race, it utilised technical regulations which limited cars to near production specifications, unlike the Australian Touring Car Championship which was for more highly modified Group C Improved Production Touring Cars. Manufacturers took a stronger interest in the race in this period and the Ford works team led by Canadian driver Allan Moffat won the 1969 race in a Ford XW Falcon GTHO Phase I, the first of six wins for Moffat. From 1970 the event's distance went from three hours to 250 miles, with Colin Bond driving a Holden LJ Torana GTR XU-1 to victory in 1971 and John Goss winning the last Series Production 500 in 1972 in a Ford XY Falcon GTHO Phase III.

=== Group C Touring Car era ===
The race was contested by the newly introduced Group C Touring Car category from 1973, while from 1976 the event became known as the Sandown 400, held over 400 kilometres, despite only being scheduled for 338 kilometres in 1980 and 1982. During the Group C era, the event was dominated by Peter Brock who won nine of the twelve races, six with the Holden Dealer Team. The other three races were won by Allan Moffat. The 1982 race was the first Sandown endurance race since 1965 to be won by a make other than a Ford or Holden, Moffat scoring the first of two consecutive wins in a Mazda RX-7. His 1982 victory came after he was disqualified, then re-instated after a pit lane infringement penalty was removed post-race. With the Sandown circuit being upgraded and lengthened from 3.1 km to 3.9 km in mid-1984, the race was increased from 400 km to 500 km. Peter Brock and Larry Perkins won the 1984 race in a Holden VK Commodore. It was Brock's record 9th and last win in the Sandown Enduro.

=== Group A Touring Car era ===
Group C was replaced by Australian regulations based on International Group A Touring Car rules in 1985. Jim Richards and Tony Longhurst won the first Group A race for driving a BMW 635 CSi, before George Fury scored a pair of victories in turbocharged Nissan Skylines with Glenn Seton in 1986 and Terry Shiel in 1987. The 1986 race was the first time a turbo powered car had won the Sandown enduro. Moffat claimed his sixth and final victory in 1988 in a Ford Sierra RS500 with former Grand Prix motorcyclist Gregg Hansford (the race would also prove to be Moffat's final race win in Australia). In a return to the original circuit layout, Nissan won again in 1989 with Jim Richards and Mark Skaife, before Seton and Fury took repeated their 1986 success with a win in Seton's Ford Sierra in 1990. The team of Mark Gibbs and Rohan Onslow driving a Bob Forbes Racing Nissan GT-R had the biggest win of their careers in 1991. A slim entry of Group A cars in 1991 saw race organisers bring production cars back to the race as additional entries running in their own class, as they would in 1992, 1993 and 1994. A class for cars complying with the 1993 Group 3A 5.0 Litre Touring Car regulations, later to become known as V8 Supercars, was also included in the 1992 race. The 1992 Sandown 500 featured a memorable late race duel between Larry Perkins in his Group A Holden VL Commodore and Tony Longhurst in his BMW M3 in changeable weather, with Perkins holding on for his second Sandown win and the only win for his co-driver Steve Harrington.

=== Group 3A Touring Car era ===
The Group 3A 5.0 Litre Touring Cars regulations were adopted for the 500 in 1993 and Glenn Seton Racing's second entry, driven by David Parsons and Geoff Brabham won a race of high attrition. 1994 saw Dick Johnson's breakthrough win in the one race he had not been able to win in almost 20 years. He and John Bowe backed it up with a second win in 1995. The Holden Racing Team then scored consecutive wins with Craig Lowndes and Greg Murphy, including a memorable duel with Glenn Seton in 1997. Larry Perkins claimed his third win in 1998 with Russell Ingall before V8 Supercars, as it was then known, decided to look for other opportunities for their 500 km race.

=== Nations Cup era ===
The second hiatus in the history of the race commenced in 1999 when a Queensland government-supported bid saw the Sandown 500 replaced on the Supercars calendar by the Queensland 500, held at Queensland Raceway. The Sandown 500 was revived in 2001, returning to its roots as a race for production cars. With regulations linked to those of the Australian Nations Cup Championship, (a championship for GT style cars), and the Australian GT Production Car Championship, the race featured a more exotic variety of cars than it had traditionally attracted. John Bowe, driving with Tom Waring, took his third Sandown 500 win in 2001 in a Ferrari 360, and a Lamborghini Diablo driven by multiple Australian Drivers' Champion Paul Stokell and Anthony Tratt won in 2002.

=== V8 Supercars era ===
By 2003, new owners of Queensland Raceway had tired of the relative expense of the 500 kilometre endurance race format, resulting in the Sandown 500 again being contested by V8 Supercars. By 2003, the 500 kilometre event, as well as the Bathurst 1000, was also included as a points-paying event within each V8 Supercars season, which meant that the circuit's sprint event dropped off the championship for the first extended period since the 1960s.

The 2003 race, which featured a mid-race hail storm, was also notable for a late race battle between Mark Skaife and Jason Richards in wet conditions. On the penultimate lap, Richards attempted to pass Skaife for the lead at Turn 9, but ended up bogged in the gravel trap and out of the race. Skaife also toured the gravel trap but was able to rejoin the track and went on to win. The 2004, 2005 and 2006 races saw the debut championship event wins in the category for Greg Ritter, Yvan Muller and Mark Winterbottom respectively. In 2007, Lowndes won the event for the fourth time, with Jamie Whincup. Lowndes and Whincup would go on to become the first pairing to win the Sandown 500 and Bathurst 1000 in the same year since Lowndes and Murphy in 1996.

After a change of promoter of Sandown Raceway's motorsport activities, a changed V8 Supercars calendar resulted in the 500 kilometre event moving to the Phillip Island Grand Prix Circuit for the 2008 season, while Sandown reverted to hosting a sprint round, an event which became known as the Sandown Challenge.

=== Australian Manufacturers' Championship ===
The Sandown 500 was revived in 2011 as a round of the Australian Manufacturers' Championship. It was split into two legs, run on Saturday and Sunday, with the overall placings based on the combined results of the two legs. The semi-factory supported Mitsubishi entry of Stuart Kostera and Ian Tulloch claimed the win in their Mitsubishi Lancer Evolution.

=== Return of Supercars ===
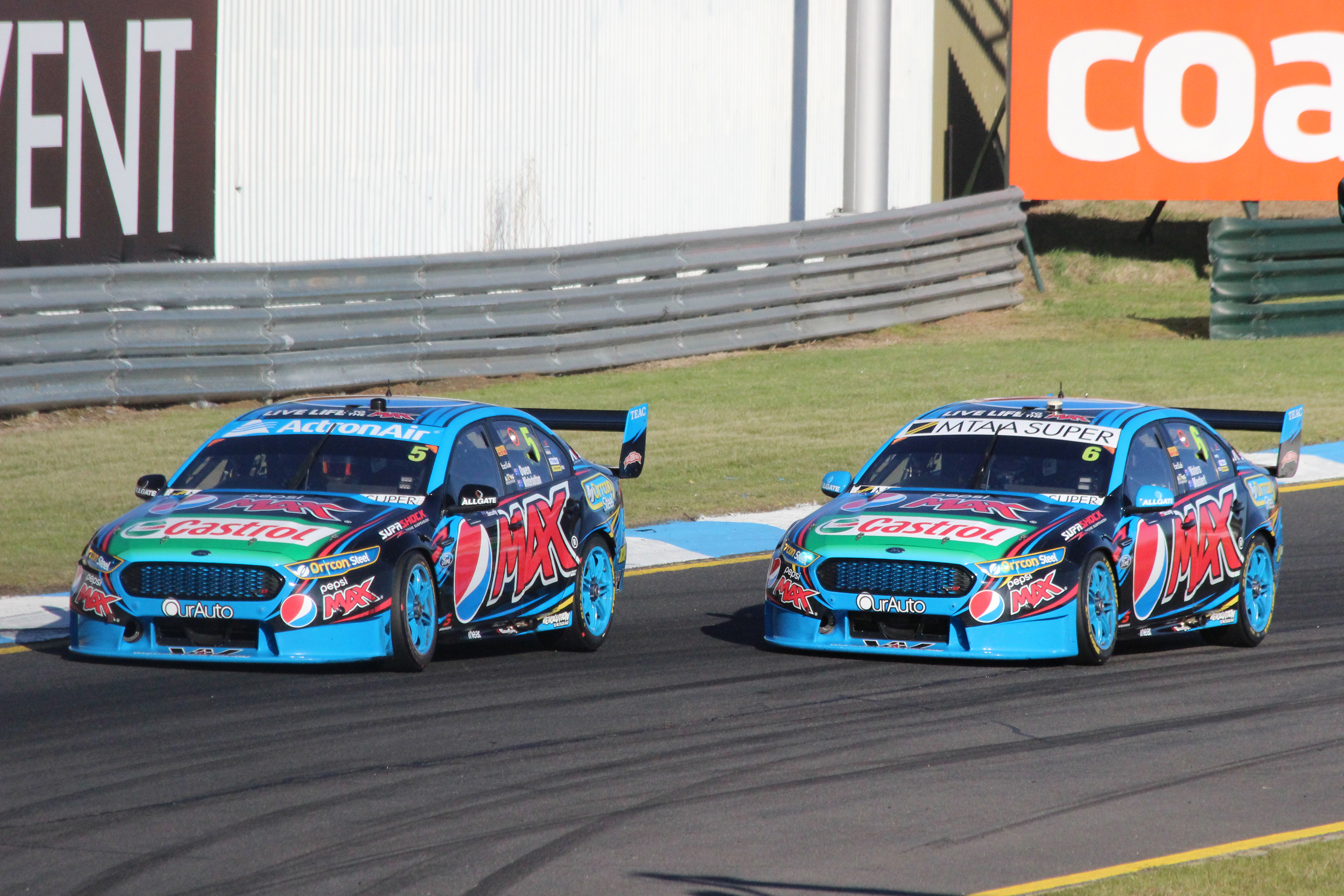
Prodrive Racing Australia secured a one-two finish in the 2015 Sandown 500

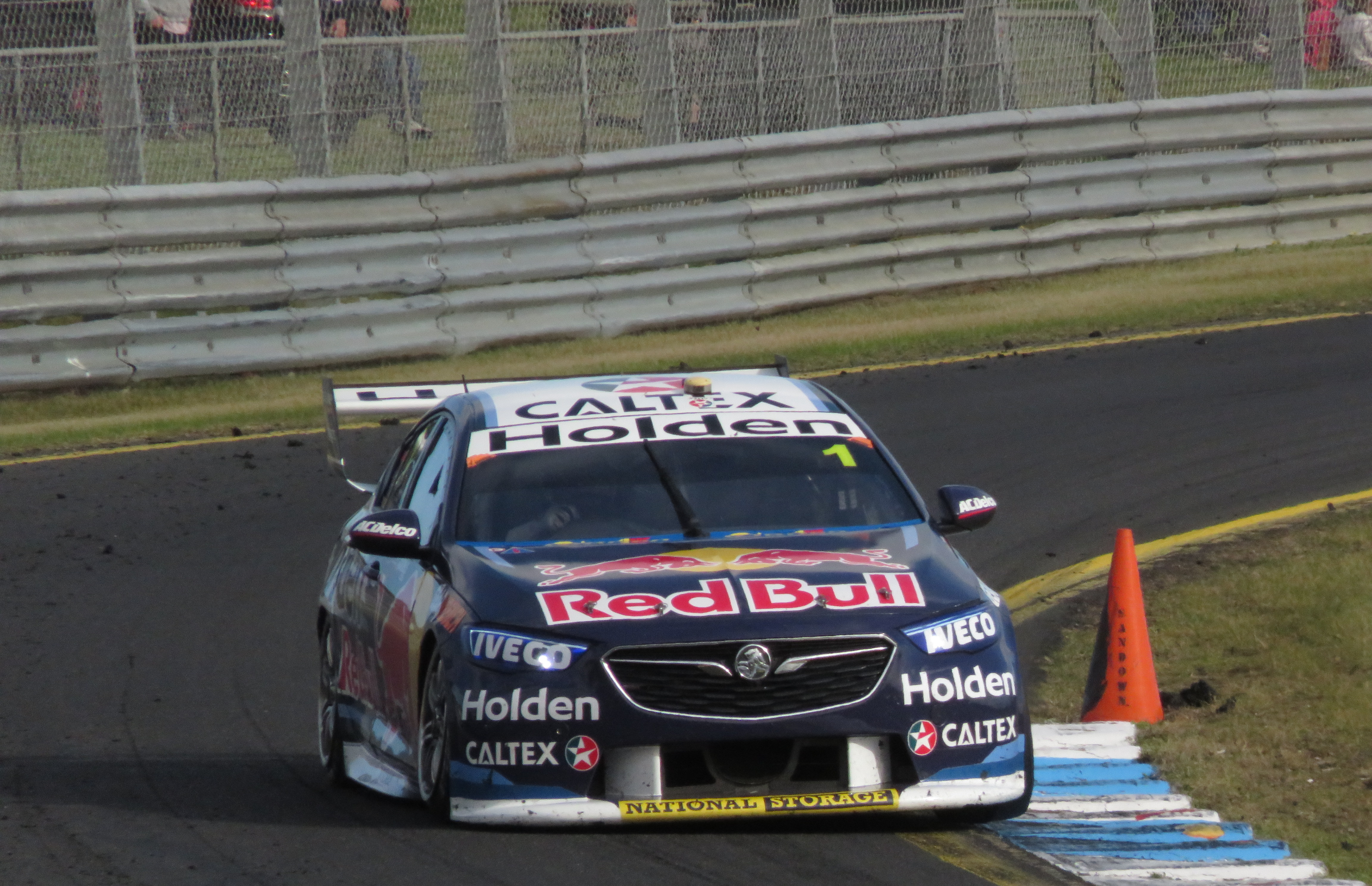
Jamie Whincup won the fourth of his five Sandown 500s in 2018, driving with Paul Dumbrell

The Sandown 500 returned to the V8 Supercars calendar in 2012, replacing the Phillip Island 500 to again become the traditional lead-in race to the Bathurst 1000. The format used at the Phillip Island 500 from 2008 to 2012 was brought to Sandown, with two short races on Saturday used to set the grid. Each co-driver has to drive one of the two races. From 2013, the event became part of the newly formed Pirtek Enduro Cup within the Supercars season, along with the series' other two-driver races, the Bathurst 1000 and Gold Coast 600. Triple Eight Race Engineering dominated on the return to the track, with wins from 2012 to 2014. 2015 saw Winterbottom win the Sandown 500 for a second time, having first tasted success in 2006, leading home a Prodrive Racing Australia one-two finish.

From 2016 onwards, the newly-renamed Supercars Championship promoted the event as a "retro round", with several teams adopting one-off liveries for the event. The idea was loosely inspired by NASCAR's Bojangles' 500, that since 2015 has become a "retro round". The race itself saw Garth Tander, driving with 2012 winner Warren Luff, win his first Sandown 500 in mixed conditions, holding off Shane van Gisbergen by under half a second. The race was shortened by 18 laps following a first lap crash involving James Golding that damaged the turn 6 tyre barrier which needed to be repaired. The 2017 event was again shortened due to a lap one crash at turn 6, this time involving Taz Douglas. Cam Waters and Richie Stanaway won the race, the first race victories of both of their Supercars careers. In 2018, Triple Eight Race Engineering dominated the event, scoring a clean sweep of the three podium positions, led by Whincup and Paul Dumbrell who won their third Sandown 500 together.

The 2019 event was scheduled in November, resulting in no lead-in endurance event to the Bathurst 1000, while the Saturday grid races became official championship points-paying races. It was also announced in the months leading up to the event that the Sandown 500 would not return in 2020, to be replaced by The Bend 500 at The Bend Motorsport Park (which eventually did not happen to the COVID-19 pandemic. Sandown is scheduled to remain on the calendar with the return of the circuit's sprint event. At the final scheduled running of the event, Triple Eight, who had dropped to two entrants in 2019, were on track for another one-two finish before a mechanical failure while leading took the van Gisbergen/Tander entry, who had started from second last on the grid, out of contention. Whincup inherited the lead and won the race with Craig Lowndes, a repeat of their 2007 win together and their fifth and sixth wins of the race respectively. Meanwhile, after being relegated to last position on the grid for a technical infringement dating back to the 2019 Bathurst 1000, Scott McLaughlin secured the 2019 Supercars Championship with a round to spare with a ninth place finish driving with Alexandre Prémat.

=== Post-COVID-19 Return ===
After three years of a single two-driver endurance race on the calendar, including the return of the Sandown SuperSprint event in 2021 and 2022, the 2023 Supercars Championship re-instated the 500 in its traditional pre-Bathurst slot. The first two events of its return were won by Triple Eight Race Engineering - including Whincup's sixth event win in 2023.

== List of winners ==
Year	Event name	Driver(s)	Car	Laps Elapsed time	Race average speed
1964	Sandown 6 Hour International	(Australia) Ralph Sach (Italy) Roberto Bussinello	Alfa Romeo Giulia Super Ti	230 laps	—N/a
1965	International 6 Hour Touring Car Race	(Australia) Frank Gardner (Australia) Kevin Bartlett	Alfa Romeo Giulia Super Ti	231 laps	—N/a
1966 – 1967	not held				
1968	Sandown Three Hour Datsun Trophy Race	(Australia) Tony Roberts (Australia) Bob Watson	Holden HK Monaro GTS327	116 laps	—N/a
1969	Sandown Three Hour Datsun Trophy Race	(Canada) Allan Moffat (Australia) John French	Ford XW Falcon GTHO	118 laps	—N/a
1970	Sandown Three Hour 250	(Canada) Allan Moffat	Ford XW Falcon GT-HO Phase II	130 laps	—N/a
1971	Sandown 250	(Australia) Colin Bond	Holden LC Torana GTR XU-1	130 laps	—N/a
1972	Sandown 250	(Australia) John Goss	Ford XY Falcon GTHO Phase III	130 laps	—N/a
1973	Sandown 250	(Australia) Peter Brock	Holden LJ Torana GTR XU-1	130 laps	—N/a
1974	Sandown 250	(Canada) Allan Moffat	Ford XB Falcon GT Hardtop	130 laps	—N/a
1975	Sandown 250	(Australia) Peter Brock	Holden LH Torana SL/R 5000 L34	130 laps	—N/a
1976	Hang Ten 400	(Australia) Peter Brock	Holden LH Torana SL/R 5000 L34	130 laps	—N/a
1977	Hang Ten 400	(Australia) Peter Brock	Holden LX Torana SS A9X Hatchback	129 laps	—N/a
1978	Hang Ten 400	(Australia) Peter Brock	Holden LX Torana SS A9X Hatchback	129 laps	—N/a
1979	Hang Ten 400	(Australia) Peter Brock	Holden LX Torana SS A9X Hatchback	129 laps	—N/a
1980	Hang Ten 400	(Australia) Peter Brock	Holden VC Commodore	109 laps^{1}	—N/a
1981	Hang Ten 400	(Australia) Peter Brock	Holden VC Commodore	119 laps^{1}	—N/a
1982	Castrol 400	(Canada) Allan Moffat	Mazda RX-7	109 laps^{1}	—N/a
1983	Castrol 400	(Canada) Allan Moffat	Mazda RX-7	129 laps	—N/a
1984	Castrol 500	(Australia) Peter Brock (Australia) Larry Perkins	Holden VK Commodore	129 laps	—N/a
1985	Castrol 500	(New Zealand) Jim Richards (Australia) Tony Longhurst	BMW 635 CSi	129 laps	—N/a
1986	Castrol 500	(Australia) George Fury (Australia) Glenn Seton	Nissan Skyline DR30 RS	129 laps	—N/a
1987	Castrol 500	(Australia) George Fury (Australia) Terry Shiel	Nissan Skyline DR30 RS	129 laps	—N/a
1988	Enzed Sandown 500	(Canada) Allan Moffat (Australia) Gregg Hansford	Ford Sierra RS500	129 laps	—N/a
1989	.05 500	(New Zealand) Jim Richards (Australia) Mark Skaife	Nissan Skyline HR31 GTS-R	161 laps	—N/a
1990	Sandown 500	(Australia) Glenn Seton (Australia) George Fury	Ford Sierra RS500	161 laps	—N/a
1991	Don't Drink Drive Sandown 500	(Australia) Mark Gibbs (Australia) Rohan Onslow	Nissan Skyline GT-R R32	161 laps	—N/a
1992	Don't Drink Drive Sandown 500	(Australia) Larry Perkins (Australia) Steve Harrington	Holden VL Commodore SS Group A SV	136 laps^{1}	—N/a
1993	Sandown 500	(Australia) Geoff Brabham (Australia) David Parsons	Ford EB Falcon	161 laps	—N/a
1994	Sandown 500	(Australia) Dick Johnson (Australia) John Bowe	Ford EB Falcon	161 laps	—N/a
1995	Sandown 500	(Australia) Dick Johnson (Australia) John Bowe	Ford EF Falcon	161 laps	—N/a
1996	Tickford 500	(Australia) Craig Lowndes (New Zealand) Greg Murphy	Holden VR Commodore	161 laps	—N/a
1997	Tickford 500	(New Zealand) Greg Murphy (Australia) Craig Lowndes	Holden VS Commodore	157 laps^{1} 3h 45m 22.3508s	129.7393 km/h 80.6160 mph
1998	Tickford 500	(Australia) Larry Perkins (Australia) Russell Ingall	Holden VT Commodore	147 laps^{1} 3h 45m 09.5507s	121.5908 km/h 75.5530 mph
1999 – 2000	not held				
2001	Clarion Sandown 500	(Australia) John Bowe (United Kingdom) Tom Waring	Ferrari F360 Modena Challenge	161 laps 3h 39m 05.2739s	136.8612 km/h 85.0420 mph
2002	Sandown 500	(Australia) Paul Stokell (Australia) Anthony Tratt	Lamborghini Diablo GTR	161 laps 3h 35m 12.3288s	139.3303 km/h 86.5760 mph
2003	Betta Electrical Sandown 500	(Australia) Mark Skaife (Australia) Todd Kelly	Holden VY Commodore	141 laps^{1} 3h 26m 50.4750s	126.9565 km/h 78.8870 mph
2004	Betta Electrical Sandown 500	(Australia) Marcos Ambrose (Australia) Greg Ritter	Ford BA Falcon	160 laps^{1} 3h 41m 03.1307s	134.8026 km/h 83.7620 mph
2005	Betta Electrical 500	(Australia) Craig Lowndes (France) Yvan Muller	Ford BA Falcon	161 laps 3h 30m 51.8944s	142.1983 km/h 88.3580 mph
2006	Betta Electrical 500	(Australia) Jason Bright (Australia) Mark Winterbottom	Ford BA Falcon	161 laps 3h 22m 16.2954s	148.2395 km/h 92.1120 mph
2007	Just Car Insurance 500	(Australia) Craig Lowndes (Australia) Jamie Whincup	Ford BF Falcon	161 laps 3h 23m 16.5157s	147.5076 km/h 91.6570 mph
2008 – 2010	not held				
2011	Dial Before You Dig AMC 500	(Australia) Stuart Kostera (New Zealand) Ian Tulloch	Mitsubishi Lancer RS-E Evolution X	133 laps^{1} 3h 33m 28.5658s	116.0314 km/h 72.0990 mph
2012	Dick Smith Sandown 500	(Australia) Craig Lowndes (Australia) Warren Luff	Holden VE Commodore	161 laps 3h 19m 14.8927s	150.4889 km/h 93.5090 mph
2013	Wilson Security Sandown 500	(Australia) Jamie Whincup (Australia) Paul Dumbrell	Holden VF Commodore	161 laps 3h 22m 54.6204s	147.7729 km/h 91.8218 mph
2014	Wilson Security Sandown 500	(Australia) Jamie Whincup (Australia) Paul Dumbrell	Holden VF Commodore	161 laps 3h 22m 44.3084s	147.8981 km/h 91.8996 mph
2015	Wilson Security Sandown 500	(Australia) Mark Winterbottom (Australia) Steve Owen	Ford FG X Falcon	161 laps 3h 19m 48.9226s	150.0617 km/h 93.2440 mph
2016	Wilson Security Sandown 500	(Australia) Garth Tander (Australia) Warren Luff	Holden VF Commodore	143 laps^{1} 3h 30m 56.7695s	126.251 km/h 78.449 mph
2017	Wilson Security Sandown 500	(Australia) Cam Waters (New Zealand) Richie Stanaway	Ford FG X Falcon	125 laps^{1} 3h 31m 35.7850s	110.0206 km/h 68.3636 mph
2018	RABBLE.club Sandown 500	(Australia) Jamie Whincup (Australia) Paul Dumbrell	Holden ZB Commodore	161 laps 3h 17m 28.6203s	151.8386 km/h 94.3121 mph
2019	Penrite Oil Sandown 500	(Australia) Jamie Whincup (Australia) Craig Lowndes	Holden ZB Commodore	161 laps 3h 13m 09.9977s	155.227 km/h 96.4535 mph
2020 – 2022	not held				
2023	Penrite Oil Sandown 500	(Australia) Broc Feeney (Australia) Jamie Whincup	Chevrolet Camaro ZL1-1LE	158 laps^{1} 3h 21m 16.9982s	147.816 km/h 91.8483 mph
2024	Penrite Oil Sandown 500	(Australia) Will Brown (Australia) Scott Pye	Chevrolet Camaro ZL1-1LE	154 laps^{1} 3h 35m 38.9364s	133.059 km/h 82.684 mph

Notes

- ^1– Race was stopped before full race distance because of time limit set by officials.

== Records and statistics ==
=== Multiple winners ===
==== By driver ====
Wins	Driver	Years
9	(Australia) Peter Brock	1973, 1975, 1976, 1977, 1978, 1979, 1980, 1981, 1984
6	(Canada) Allan Moffat	1969, 1970, 1974, 1982, 1983, 1988
6	(Australia) Craig Lowndes	1996, 1997, 2005, 2007, 2012, 2019
6	(Australia) Jamie Whincup	2007, 2013, 2014, 2018, 2019, 2023
3	(Australia) George Fury	1986, 1987, 1990
3	(Australia) Larry Perkins	1984, 1992, 1998
3	(Australia) John Bowe	1994, 1995, 2001
3	(Australia) Paul Dumbrell	2013, 2014, 2018
2	(New Zealand) Jim Richards	1985, 1989
2	(Australia) Glenn Seton	1986, 1990
2	(Australia) Dick Johnson	1994, 1995
2	(New Zealand) Greg Murphy	1996, 1997
2	(Australia) Mark Skaife	1989, 2003
2	(Australia) Mark Winterbottom	2006, 2015
2	(Australia) Warren Luff	2012, 2016

==== By entrant ====
Wins	Entrant
9	Triple Eight Race Engineering
7	Holden Dealer Team
4	Allan Moffat Racing
4	Holden Racing Team
3	Gibson Motorsport
3	Prodrive Racing Australia
2	Alec Mildren Racing
2	Ford Works Team
2	Glenn Seton Racing
2	Dick Johnson Racing
2	Perkins Engineering

==== By manufacturer ====
Wins	Manufacturer
22	Holden
15	Ford
4	Nissan
2	Alfa Romeo
2	Mazda
2	Chevrolet

=== Most pole positions ===
Rank	Driver	Poles
1	(Australia) Peter Brock	9
2	(Australia) Dick Johnson	5
2	(Canada) Allan Moffat	5

=== Most podiums ===
Rank	Driver	Podiums
1	(Australia) Peter Brock	11
2	(Canada) Allan Moffat	10
2	(Australia) Craig Lowndes	10

== Event sponsors ==
- 1968–69: Datsun
- 1976–81: Hang Ten
- 1982–87: Castrol
- 1988: Enzed
- 1989: .05
- 1991–92: Don't Drink Drive
- 1996–98: Tickford
- 2001: Clarion
- 2003–05: Betta Electrical
- 2007: Just Car Insurance
- 2011: Dial Before You Dig
- 2012: Dick Smith
- 2013–17: Wilson Security
- 2018: RABBLE.club
- 2019, 2023–present: Penrite Oil

== See also ==
- Sandown SuperSprint
- List of Australian Touring Car Championship races
