= 1973 Sandown 250 =

The 1973 Sandown 250 was an endurance race for Group C Touring Cars. It was staged at Sandown in Victoria, Australia on 9 September 1973 over 130 laps of the 3.1 km circuit, a total distance of 403 km (250 mi). The race was Round 2 of the 1973 Australian Manufacturers' Championship and was the eighth in a sequence of annual endurance races now known as the Sandown 500.

The race was won by Peter Brock driving a Holden Torana GTR XU-1.

== Results ==
Position	Drivers	No.	Car	Entrant	Laps
1	Peter Brock	1	Holden Torana GTR XU-1	Holden Dealer Team	130
2	Colin Bond	24	Holden Torana GTR XU-1	Holden Dealer Team	130
3	John Goss	5	Ford XA Falcon GT Hardtop	McLeod Ford - Shell Racing	129
4	Fred Gibson	6	Ford XA Falcon GT Hardtop	Ford Motor Company of Australia	129
5	Murray Carter	15	Ford XA Falcon GT Hardtop	Murray Carter - Shell Racing	125
6	Tony Niovanni	21	Holden Torana GTR XU-1	Peter Robinson Motors	124
7	Bob Morris, John Leffler	7	Holden Torana GTR XU-1	Ron Hodgson Motors	124
8	Rod McRae	12	Holden Torana GTR XU-1	Dustings of Burwood	120
9	Ray Harrison	49	Alfa Romeo 2000 GTV	AF & M Beninca	119
10	Brian Ovenden	31	Chrysler Valiant Charger R/T E49	Tony Roberts Automotive Centre	
11	Ray Thackwell	26	Holden Torana GTR XU-1	Ray Thackwell Racing	
12	Geoff Perry	48	Mazda RX-3	Mazda Racing Team	118
	Class A : Up to 1300cc				
1	James Laing-Peach	56	Datsun 1200 Coupe	Datsun Racing Team	113
2	Lynne Brown	58	Morris Cooper S	Jack Haywood	
3	David Clement	33	Morris Cooper S	Clement Motors	105
4	David Jarrett	32	Morris Clubman GT	Shell Vimy Ridge Racing	
5	Noel Riley	63	Honda Civic	Bennett Honda	
6	Jon Leighton	66	Morris Cooper S	Mini-Bits	
?	John Lord	54	Morris Cooper S	Lordco (Australia) Pty Ltd	
?	Gary Leggatt	60	Morris Cooper S	Fourways Motors Bankstwon	
DNF	Geoff Newton	57	Morris Cooper S	G Newton	21
DNF	Peter Janson	44	Honda Civic	Honda Australia Pty Ltd	
	Class B : 1301cc to 2000cc				
1	Ray Harrison	49	Alfa Romeo 2000 GTV	AF & M Beninca	119
2	Geoff Perry	48	Mazda RX-3	Mazda Racing Team	118
3	Bill Evans	41	Datsun 180B SSS	Datsun Racing Team	109
4	Wayne Thomson	47	Ford Escort GT1600	WD Electrics	
DNF	Mel Mollison	45	Mazda RX-3	Mazda Racing Team	50
DNF	Barry Lee	51	Ford Escort GT1600	B Lee	
DNF	Bob Holden	43	Ford Escort GT1600	Bryan Byrt Ford	
DNF	Graham Ritter	42	Ford Escort GT1600	Strapp Ford	7
DNF	Tony Farrell	39	Ford Escort GT1600	Tony Farrell	
	Class C : 2001cc to 3000cc				
1	Gary Cooke	35	Mazda Capella RX-2	James Mason Motors	102
2	George Garth	36	Holden Torana GTR	McLeod Kelso & Lee	72
	Class D : Over 3000cc				
1	Peter Brock	1	Holden Torana GTR XU-1	Holden Dealer Team	130
2	Colin Bond	24	Holden Torana GTR XU-1	Holden Dealer Team	130
3	John Goss	5	Ford XA Falcon GT Hardtop	McLeod Ford - Shell Racing	129
4	Fred Gibson	6	Ford XA Falcon GT Hardtop	Ford Motor Company of Australia	129
5	Murray Carter	15	Ford XA Falcon GT Hardtop	Murray Carter - Shell Racing	125
6	Tony Niovanni	21	Holden Torana GTR XU-1	Peter Robinson Motors	124
7	Bob Morris, John Leffler		Holden Torana GTR XU-1	Ron Hodgson Motors	124
8	Rod McRae	12	Holden Torana GTR XU-1	Dustings of Burwood	120
9	Brian Ovenden	31	Chrysler Valiant Charger R/T E49	Tony Roberts Automotive Centre	
10	Ray Thackwell	26	Holden Torana GTR XU-1	Ray Thackwell Racing	
11	John Bassett	18	Holden Torana GTR XU-1	Stewart McLeod	
12	Ron Dickson	8	Holden Monaro GTS 308 4 Door	Muirs Motors Ashfield	
13	Robin Keitley	97	Holden Torana GTR XU-1	Robin Keitley	
14	Laurie Nelson	88	Chrysler Valiant Charger R/T E49	L Nelson	
DNF	Graeme Blanchard	16	Holden Torana GTR XU-1	Blanchard Motors	
DNF	John Harvey	2	Holden Torana GTR XU-1	Bob Jane Racing	57
DNF	Pat Peck, Karen McPherson	25	Holden Torana GTR XU-1	D&P Traders	
DNF	Robert Bride	72	Holden Torana GTR XU-1	ACI Fibreglass	
DNF	Allan Moffat	9	Ford XA Falcon GT Hardtop	Ford Motor Company of Australia	52
DNF	John French	4	Ford XA Falcon GT Hardtop	Bryan Byrt Ford	51
DNF	Ian Geoghegan	10	Ford XA Falcon GT Hardtop	Ford Motor Company of Australia	2

Preceded by 1972 Sandown 250	Sandown 250; 1973	Succeeded by 1974 Sandown 250
