= 1979 Hang Ten 400 =

The 1979 Hang Ten 400 was an endurance motor race held at the Sandown Park circuit in Victoria, Australia on 9 September 1979. It was staged over 129 laps of the 3.11 km circuit, a total of 401 km. The race was Round 1 of the 1979 Australian Championship of Makes and as such it was open to Group C Touring Cars. It was the fourteenth in a sequence of annual Sandown long-distance races. The race was won by Peter Brock.

== Classes ==
Cars competed in three classes according to engine capacity:

- Class A: 3001 to 6000cc
- Class B: 2001 to 3000cc
- Class C: Up to 2000cc

== Results ==
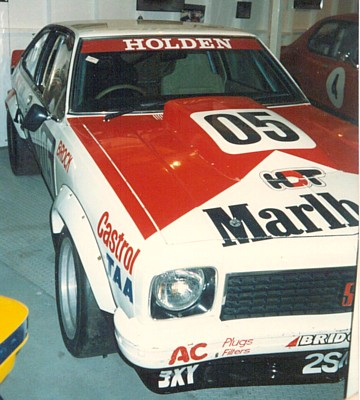
Peter Brock won the 1979 Hang Ten 400 driving a Holden LX Torana SS 5000 A9X for the Marlboro Holden Dealer Team

| Position | Drivers | No. | Car | Entrant | Class | Laps |
|---|---|---|---|---|---|---|
| 1 | Peter Brock | 05 | Holden LX Torana SS A9X Hatchback | Holden Dealer Team | A | 129 |
| 2 | John Harvey | 26 | Holden LX Torana SS A9X Hatchback | Holden Dealer Team | A | 128 |
| 3 | Peter Janson; Larry Perkins | 9 | Holden LX Torana SS A9X Hatchback | Captain P Janson | A | 125 |
| 4 | Murray Carter | 18 | Ford XC Falcon GS500 Hardtop | Brian Wood Ford | A | 123 |
| 5 | Alan Browne | 24 | Holden LX Torana SS A9X Hatchback | Re-Car Consolidated Industries | A | 122 |
| 6 | Allan Taylor | 15 | Holden LX Torana SS A9X Hatchback | Scotty Taylor Holden | A | 120 |
| 7 | John Gates | 46 | Mazda RX-3 | Barry Lee | B | 114 |
| 8 | Graeme Bailey | 61 | Toyota Celica | Brian Hilton Toyota | C | 113 |
| 9 | Graham Mein | 55 | Ford Escort RS2000 | G Mein | C | 112 |
| 10 | Roger Cartwright | 54 | Ford Escort RS2000 | R Cartwright | C | 112 |
| 11 | Peter Kuebler | 63 | Alfa Romeo 2000 GTV | Safcol Snappy Tom | C | 109 |
| 12 | Ian Wells | 72 | Holden Gemini | Modulaire Air Conditioning | C | 106 |
| 13 | Chris Heyer | 73 | Volkswagen Golf | Lennox Motors | C | 106 |
| 14 | Ken Price | 74 | Holden Gemini | Modulaire Air Conditioning | C | 102 |
| 15 | Jim Faneco | 75 | Holden Gemini | Victorian Police Motor Sports Club | C | 102 |
| 16 | Dean Gall | 45 | Mazda RX-7 | Precinct Performance | B | 100 |
| 17 | Martin Power | 62 | Triumph Dolomite Sprint | Jagparts | C | 93 |
| 18 | Frank Porter | 59 | Alfa Romeo Alfetta GTV | Beninca Motors | C | 92 |
| 19 | Larry Kogge | 41 | Mazda RX-3 | L Kogge | B | 90 |
| 20 | John Faulkner | 79 | Ford Escort RS2000 | | C | 88 |
| 21 | Brian Boyd | 42 | BMW 3.0 | Brian Boyd | B | 87 |
| 22 | Mal Smith | 69 | Holden Gemini | Victorian Police Motor Sports Club | C | 87 |
| DNF | Allan Grice | 6 | Holden LX Torana SS A9X Hatchback | Craven Mild Racing | A | |
| DNF | Allan Moffat | 25 | Ford XC Falcon GS500 Hardtop | Allan Moffat Racing | A | |
| DNF | Bill O'Brien | 30 | Ford XC Falcon GS500 Hardtop | Everlast Battery Service | A | |
| DNF | Bob Morris | 7 | Holden LX Torana SS A9X Hatchback | Ron Hodgson Channel 7 Racing | A | |
| DNF | Charlie O'Brien | 21 | Holden LX Torana SS A9X Hatchback | Roadways / Gown-Hindhaugh | A | |
| DNF | Colin Bond | 4 | Ford XC Falcon GS 500 Hardtop | Thomson Ford | A | |
| DNF | David Earle | 68 | Ford Escort | Bob Holden | C | |
| DNF | Garry Rogers | 34 | Holden LX Torana SS A9X Hatchback | Greater Pacific Finance | A | |
| DNF | Garth Wigston | 20 | Holden LX Torana SS A9X Hatchback | Roadways / Gown-Hindhaugh | A | |
| DNF | Gary Cooke | 11 | Holden LX Torana SS A9X 4-Door | Citizen Watches Australia Pty Ltd | A | |
| DNF | Jim Keogh | 12 | Ford XC Falcon GS500 Hardtop | Rusty French Racing | A | |
| DNF | Michael Quinn | 77 | Toyota Corolla Levin | Peter Williamson Pty Ltd | C | |
| DNF | Ray Allford | 28 | Ford XC Falcon GS500 Hardtop | Ray Allford Motors | A | |
| DNF | Ray Farrar | 46 | Ford Capri V6 | R Farrar | B | |
| DNF | Rod Stevens | 36 | Ford XC Falcon GS500 Hardtop | Brian Wood Ford | A | |
| DNF | Ron Wanless | 27 | Ford XC Falcon GS500 Hardtop | Denimac Ford Pty Ltd | A | |
| DNF | Rusty French | 10 | Ford XC Falcon GS500 Hardtop | Rusty French Racing | A | |
| DNF | Warren Cullen | 22 | Holden LX Torana SS A9X Hatchback | Settlement Road Wreckers | A | |
| DNF | ? | | | | | |
| DNF | ? | | | | | |
| DNF | ? | | | | | |
| DNF | ? | | | | | |
| DNF | ? | | | | | |
| DNF | ? | | | | | |
| DNF | ? | | | | | |

There were 48 starters and 22 finishers in the race.

The known non-finishers are listed in alphabetical order due to a lack of information concerning laps completed.

| Preceded by 1978 Hang Ten 400 | Sandown 400; 1979 | Succeeded by 1980 Hang Ten 400 |
