= 1973 Australian Manufacturers' Championship =

Motor racing title

The 1973 Australian Manufacturers' Championship was a CAMS sanctioned motor racing title for automobile manufacturers. It was the third Australian Manufacturers' Championship and the first to be contested with Group C Touring Cars.

| Round | Race title | Circuit | State | Date | Winning driver(s) | Winning car | Report |
| 1 | Chesterfield 250 | Adelaide International Raceway | South Australia | 26 August | (Australia) Fred Gibson | Ford XA Falcon GT Hardtop | Report |
| 2 | Sandown 250 | Sandown Park | Victoria | 9 September | (Australia) Peter Brock | Holden Torana LJ GTR XU1 | Report |
| 3 | Hardie-Ferodo 1000 | Mount Panorama | New South Wales | 30 September | (Canada) Allan Moffat (Australia) Ian Geoghegan | Ford XA Falcon GT Hardtop | Report |
| 4 | Chesterfield 300 | Surfers Paradise | Queensland | 11 November | (Australia) Peter Brock | Holden Torana LJ GTR XU1 | Report |
| 5 | Phillip Island 500K | Phillip Island | Victoria | 25 November | (Australia) Peter Brock | Holden Torana LJ GTR XU1 | Report |

== Class Structure ==
Cars competed in four engine capacity classes:

- Up to 1300 cc
- 1301 to 2000 cc
- 2001 to 3000 cc
- Over 3000 cc

== Points system ==
Championship points were awarded on a 9-8-7-6-5-4-3-2-1 basis for the first nine positions in each class plus 4-3-2-1 for the first four outright positions for all rounds except the Bathurst round. For the Bathurst round only, championship points were awarded on an 18-16-14-12-10-8-6-4-2 basis for the first nine positions in each class plus 4-3-2-1 for the first four outright positions. Only the best placed car from each manufacturer in each class at each round was eligible to score points.

== Results ==
| Position | Manufacturer | Car | Class | R1 | R2 | R3 | R4 | R5 | Total |
| 1 | Holden | Holden LJ Torana GTR XU-1 | Over 3000 cc | 5 | 13 | 19 | 13 | 13 | 63 |
| 2 | Alfa Romeo | Alfa Romeo 2000 GTV | 1301 to 2000 cc | 9 | 9 | 18 | 10 | 9 | 55 |
| 3 | Mazda | Mazda Capella RX-2 | 2001 to 3000 cc | 9 | 9 | 18 | 9 | 8 | 53 |
| 4 | Ford | Ford XA Falcon GT | Over 3000 cc | 13 | 9 | 22 | 5 | 2 | 51 |
| | Datsun | Datsun 1200 Coupe | Up to 1300 cc | 6 | 9 | 18 | 9 | 9 | 51 |
| 6 | Leyland | Morris Clubman GT & Morris Cooper S | Up to 1300 cc | 9 | 8 | 14 | 6 | 7 | 44 |
| 7 | Mazda | Mazda RX-3 | 1301 to 2000 cc | - | 8 | 16 | - | 8 | 32 |
| 8 | Holden | Holden LC Torana GTR | 2001 to 3000 cc | - | 8 | 14 | - | 9 | 31 |
| 9 | Honda | Honda Civic | Up to 1300 cc | 4 | 5 | 12 | - | 8 | 29 |
| 10 | Ford | Ford Escort Twin Cam & GT1600 | 1301 to 2000 cc | 8 | 6 | 14 | - | - | 28 |
| 11 | Datsun | Datsun 180B SSS | 1301 to 2000 cc | 7 | 7 | 12 | - | - | 26 |
| 12 | Chrysler | Chrysler VH Valiant Charger R/T | Over 3000 cc | 7 | 1 | 8 | - | - | 16 |
| | Fiat | Fiat 128 Coupe | Up to 1300 cc | - | - | 16 | - | - | 16 |
| 14 | Datsun | Datsun 240K | 2001 to 3000 cc | - | - | - | 8 | 7 | 15 |
| 15 | Toyota | Toyota Corolla | Up to 1300 cc | 8 | - | - | - | - | 8 |
| | Subaru | Subaru 1400 GSR | 1301 to 2000 cc | - | - | 8 | - | - | 8 |
| 17 | Renault | Renault R8 Gordini | Up to 1300 cc | - | - | 4 | - | - | 4 |
