= 1978 Hang Ten 400 =

The 1978 Hang Ten 400 was an endurance race for Group C Touring Cars. The event was staged at the Sandown International Motor Racing Circuit in Victoria, Australia on 10 September 1978 over a total distance of 401 km. Cars competed in three engine capacity classes:

- 3001 to 6000cc
- 2001 to 3000cc
- Up to 2000cc

The event was Round 2 of the 1978 Australian Championship of Makes.

== Results ==
Position	Drivers	No.	Car	Entrant	Class	Laps
1	Peter Brock	05	Holden Torana LX SS A9X Hatchback	Holden Dealer Team	6000cc	129
2	John Harvey	15	Holden Torana LX SS A9X Hatchback	Holden Dealer Team	6000cc	128
3	Barry Seton	33	Holden Torana LX SS A9X Hatchback	Amco Pty Ltd	6000cc	125
4	Allan Grice	6	Holden Torana LX SS A9X Hatchback	Craven Mild Racing	6000cc	122
5	Allan Taylor	13	Holden Torana LX SS A9X Hatchback	Scotty Taylor Holden	6000cc	122
6	Ron Dickson	14	Ford Falcon XC GS500 Hardtop	Thomson Ford	6000cc	119
7	Bill Evans	68	Ford Escort RS2000	Brian Wood Ford	2000cc	117
8	Lawrie Nelson	38	Ford Capri V6	Lawrie Nelson	3000cc	117
9	Peter Wiliamson	70	Toyota Celica GT	Peter Wiliamson P/L	2000cc	117
10	James Laing-Peach; Steve Masterton	52	Ford Capri V6	Amco Pty Ltd	3000cc	116
11	John Duggan	51	Mazda RX-3	John Duggan	3000cc	114
12	Jack Brabham	8	Holden Torana LX SLR 5000 A9X 4-Door	Jack Brabham Holdings P/L	6000cc	113
13	Gary Dumbrell; John Faulkner	49	Ford Capri V6	Wynns Friction Proofing Racing Team	3000cc	113
14	Peter Granger	67	BMW	Bob Glassier	2000cc	112
15	Brain Potts	48	Mazda RX-3	B Potts	3000cc	112
16	Bob Holden	63	Ford Escort RS2000	Bob Holden / Shellsport	2000cc	111
17	Roger Cartwright	65	Ford Escort RS2000	R Cartwright	2000cc	111
18	Garth Wigston	20	Holden Torana LX SS A9X Hatchback	Roadways / Gown-Hindhaugh	6000cc	110
19	Geoffrey Wade	62	Alfa Romeo		2000cc	110
20	Noel Edwards	44	Mazda	Noel Edwards	3000cc	109
21	Ian Chilman	41	Mazda	Ian Chilman	3000cc	109
22	Peter Janson	9	Holden Torana LX SS A9X Hatchback		6000cc	108
23	Ian Lees	42	Ford Capri V6	Hillrise Properties P/L	3000cc	106
24	Ian Messner	57	Ford Escort RS2000	Bob Holden Shellsport	2000cc	105
25	Robin Dudfield	55	Alfa Romeo	R.C. Dudfield	2000cc	105
26	Matthew Philip	75	Honda Civic	Mollison Motors P/L	2000cc	104
27	Colin Campbell	50	Ford Capri V6	Ranger Truck Rentals P/L	3000cc	103
DNF	Wayne Negus	21	Holden Torana LX SS A9X Hatchback	Roadways / Gown-Hindhaugh	6000cc	94
DNF	Murray Carter	18	Ford Falcon XC GS500 Hardtop	Brian Wood Ford	6000cc	75
DNF	Gary Cooke	11	Holden Torana LX SS A9X Hatchback	Citizen Watches Australia P/L	6000cc	
DNF	Bob Morris	7	Holden Torana LX SS A9X Hatchback	Ron Hodgson Channel 7 Racing	6000cc	
DNF	Garry Rogers	34	Holden Torana LX SS A9X Hatchback	Greater Pacific Finance	6000cc	
DNF	John Latham; Brian Reed	26	Holden Torana LX SS A9X Hatchback	Bruce Spicer	6000cc	
DNF	Allan Moffat	1	Ford Falcon XC Cobra	Moffat Ford Dealers	6000cc	
DNF	Colin Bond	2	Ford Falcon XC Cobra	Moffat Ford Dealers	6000cc	
DNF	Jim Keogh	24	Ford Falcon XC GS500 Hardtop	Shellsport / Henderson Federal Spring Works P/L	6000cc	
DNF	Dick Johnson	17	Ford Falcon XC GS500 Hardtop	Bryan Byrt Ford	6000cc	
DNF	Warwick Brown	32	Ford Falcon XC GS500 Hardtop	Bryan Byrt Ford	6000cc	
DNF	Bill O'Brien	30	Ford Falcon XC GS500 Hardtop	Everlast Battery Service	6000cc	
DNF	Ray Farrar	46	Ford Capri V6	Brian Wood Ford	3000cc	
DNF	Rod Stevens	69	Ford Escort RS2000	Brian Wood Ford	2000cc	
DNF	David Cannon	77	Ford Escort RS2000		2000cc	
DNF	Greville Arnel	64	Ford Escort RS2000	Bob Holden Shellsport	2000cc	
DNF	Ian Sonneman	61	Ford Escort RS2000		2000cc	
DNF	Phillip Brock	16	Holden Torana LX SS A9X Hatchback		6000cc	

Note: The above results listing is incomplete with regard to the non-finishers shown.

Preceded by 1977 Hang Ten 400	Sandown 400; 1978	Succeeded by 1979 Hang Ten 400
