= 1974 Sandown 250 =

The 1974 Sandown 250 was an endurance race for Group C Touring Cars. The event was held at the Sandown Park circuit in Victoria, Australia on 8 September 1974 over a race distance of 130 laps (251 miles, 404 km). The race, which was Round 2 of the 1974 Australian Manufacturers' Championship, is recognised as the ninth Sandown 500.

The race was won by Allan Moffat driving a Ford Falcon XB GT Hardtop.

== Classes ==
Entries were divided into four classes:

- Class A : Up to 1300 c.c.
- Class B : 1301 to 2000 c.c.
- Class C : 2001 to 3000 c.c.
- Class D : 3001 c.c. and over

== Race results ==
Position	Drivers	No.	Car	Entrant	Class	Laps
1	Allan Moffat	33	Ford Falcon XB GT Hardtop	Allan Moffat Racing	D	130
2	John Leffler, Bob Morris	7	Holden Torana LJ GTR XU-1	Ron Hodgson Motors	D	128
3	Murray Carter	10	Ford Falcon XB GT Hardtop	M. Carter	D	127
4	Wayne Negus, Bob Forbes	4	Holden Torana LJ GTR XU-1	Bob Forbes Automotive	D	124
5	Dennis Martin		Holden Torana LJ GTR XU-1		D	123
6	Stuart Saker	57	Holden Torana LJ GTR XU-1	S. Saker	D	122
7	Brian Ovenden	8	Chrysler Valiant Charger R/T E49		D	121
8	Cam Richardson, Tony Niovanni	11	Holden Torana LJ GTR XU-1	Richardson Engine Reconditioning	D	121
9	Tony Farrell	23	Mazda RX-3	Mazda Racing Team	C	120
10	Peter Brock	1	Holden Torana SL/R 5000	Holden Dealer Team	D	120
11	Graeme Blanchard	16	Holden Torana LJ GTR XU-1	Insul Fluf Home Insulation	D	119
12	Niel West	12	Holden Torana LJ GTR XU-1	Neil West Motors	D	117
13	Roger Bonhomme	27	Holden Torana LJ GTR	Mollison Motors	C	117
14	Bob Beasley	29	Mazda RX-3	John Palmer Motors	C	117
15	Ray Gulson	39	Alfa Romeo 2000 GTV	R. Gulson	B	116
16	Bill Evans	52	Datsun 1200 Coupe	Datsun Racing Team	A	114
17	John Lord	54	Morris Cooper S	Lordco (Australia) P/L	A	114
18	Stewart McLeod	28	Datsun 240K	Datsun Racing Team	C	113
19	Neil Mason		Morris Cooper S		A	111
20	Geoff Wade, Geoff Leeds	14	Ford Escort Twin Cam	Peter Mac's Towing P/L	B	111
21	Lynn Brown	56	Mazda 1300	James Mason Motors P/L	A	109
22	Max McGinley	65	Honda Civic	M. McGinley	A	109
23	Ken Brian	50	Honda Civic	Auto-Village Nowra	A	108
24	John Dellaca	66	Morris Cooper S	Mini Bits	A	108
25	Nick Louis	22	Mazda RX-3	Kernan Motors (Mazda) Flemington	C	104
26	Gary Baglee, Dave Condon	96	Chrysler Galant 1600	G. Baglee	B	99
27	Russ McRae	59	Holden Torana LJ GTR XU-1	Dustings of Burwood	D	98
28	Lakis Manticas		Alfa Romeo Alfetta		B	98
DNF	Robert Bride	79	Holden Torana LJ GTR XU-1		D	110
DNF	Colin Bond	3	Holden Torana SL/R 5000	Holden Dealer Team	D	98
DNF	Alan Cant	34	Ford Escort Twin Cam	A. Cant	B	95
DNF	Jim Murcott	49	Alfa Romeo GTV	J. Murcott	B	83
DNF	Ray Kaleda	43	Holden Torana SL/R 5000	Roma Watches Pty. Ltd.	D	78
DNF	Gary Leggatt	77	Morris Cooper S	G. C. Leggatt	A	68
DNF	Bob Holden	53	Ford Escort 1300	Ken Harrison Shell Racing	A	65
DNF	John Pollard	78	Holden Torana SL/R 5000	Garry and Warren Smith	D	61
DNF	Robin Dudfield	69	Alfa Romeo Junior	Victoria Police Motor Sports Club	A	59
DNF	John Stevens	63	Ford Escort Twin Cam	Bryan Byrt Ford / Bob Holden Motors	B	58
DNF	Peter Wherrett		Alfa Romeo Alfetta		B	55
DNF	Ian Judd	89	Honda Civic	Honda Australia	A	49
DNF	Graham Ritter		Alfa Romeo GTV		B	40
DNF	John Stoopman	17	Holden Torana LJ GTR XU-1	Bayside Holden	D	37
DNF	Ray Harrison	70	Mazda R100	R. Harrison	C	20
DNF	Geoff Perry, Fred Sutherland	25	BMW 3.0S	G. Perry	C	20
DNF	Mel Mollison	42	Mazda Savannah	Bainbridge Motors	B	17
DNF	Geoff Newton	32	Ford Capri V6	G. Newton	C	1

Preceded by 1973 Sandown 250	Sandown 250; 1974	Succeeded by 1975 Sandown 250
