= 1977 Hang Ten 400 =

The 1977 Hang Ten 400 was an endurance motor race for Group C Touring Cars. It was held on 11 September 1977 at the Sandown Park circuit in Victoria, Australia over a total distance of 400 km. The race was Round 8 of the 1977 Australian Touring Car Championship and Round 1 of the 1977 Australian Championship of Makes. It was the twelfth running of the race which was later to become known as the Sandown 500.

The race was won by Peter Brock driving a Holden Torana A9X for Bill Patterson Racing.

== Classes ==
Cars competed in four engine capacity classes:

- Class A: 3001 to 6000cc
- Class B: 2001 to 3000cc
- Class C: 1301 to 2000cc
- Class D: Up to 1300cc

== Results ==
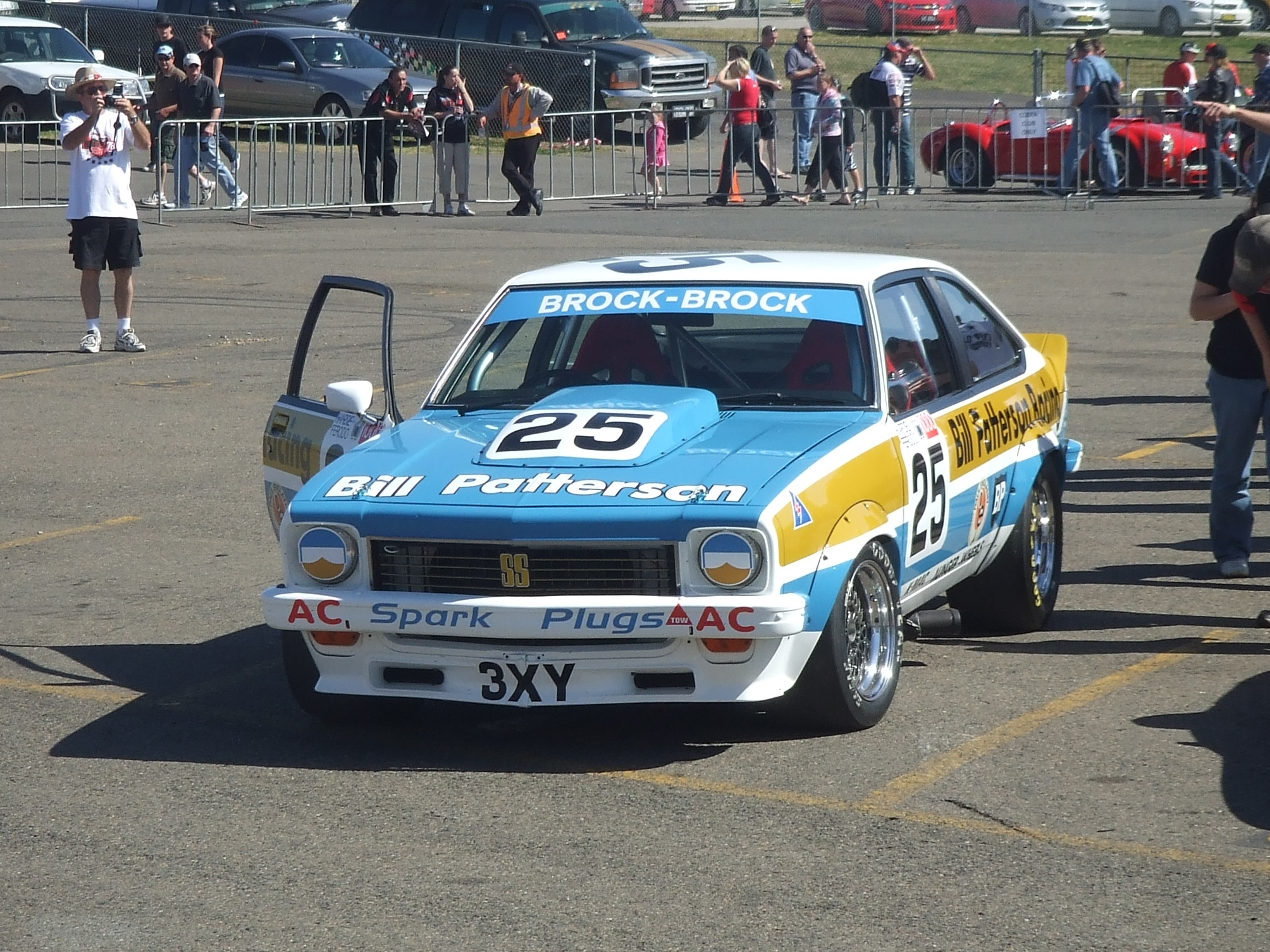
Peter Brock won the race driving a Holden Torana A9X

Position	Drivers	No.	Car	Entrant	Class	Laps
1	Peter Brock	25	Holden LX Torana SS A9X Hatchback	Bill Patterson Racing	A	129
2	Allan Grice	6	Holden LX Torana SS A9X Hatchback	Craven Mild Racing	A	128
3	Allan Moffat	1	Ford XC Falcon GS500 Hardtop	Moffat Ford Dealers	A	127
4	Bazil Van Rooyen	24	Holden LH Torana SL/R 5000 L34	Bill Patterson Racing	A	126
5	Colin Bond	2	Ford XC Falcon GS500 Hardtop	Moffat Ford Dealers	A	125
6	Lawrie Nelson	39	Ford Capri V6	Lawrie Nelson	B	119
7	John Duggan, Brian Wheeler	41	Mazda RX-3	Warren Torr	B	119
8	Brian Potts	37	Mazda RX-3	B. Potts	B	?
9	Frank Porter, Jim Murcott	59	Alfa Romeo Alfetta GTAm	Douglas Hi Fi	C	118
10	Ralph Radburn	64	Triumph Dolomite Sprint	Ralph W. Radburn	C	115
11	Warwick Henderson, Peter Hopwood	62	Alfa Romeo Alfetta GTV	Gil Gordon Alfa	C	114
12	Greg Toepfer	52	Ford Escort RS2000	Bob Holden Shell Sport	C	111
13	Chris Heyer, Rudi Dahlhauser	53	Volkswagen Golf GTi	Lennox Motors	C	110
14	Matthew Phillip	80	Honda Civic	Mollison Motors Pty Ltd	D	108
15	Robin Dudfield	83	Alfa Romeo GT 1300 Junior	Alfa Romeo Owners Club of Australia	D	107
16	Garry Leggatt	87	Fiat 128 3P	G.C. Leggatt	D	106
17	Ian Chilman, Brian Reed	84	Honda Civic	I. Chilman	D	105
18	Ray Farrar, Geoff Wade	47	Ford Capri V6	Brian Wood Ford	B	100
DNF	John Harvey	14	Holden Torana LX SS A9X Hatchback	Marlboro Holden Dealer Team	A	
DNF	John Goss, Jack Brabham	5	Ford XC Falcon GS500 Hardtop	John Goss Racing	A	
DNF	Jim Richards	10	Ford XB Falcon GT Hardtop	Melford Racing	A	
DNF	Garth Wigston	20	Holden Torana LX SS A9X Hatchback	Roadways / Gown-Hindhaugh	A	
DNF	Phil Brock	26	Holden Torana LH SL/R 5000 L34	Bill Patterson Racing	A	
DNF	Charlie O'Brien, Wayne Negus	8	Holden Torana LH SL/R 5000 L34	Marlboro Holden Dealer Team	A	
DNF	Peter Janson	15	Holden Torana LH SL/R 5000 L34	N.G.K. Janson	A	
DNF	Jim Keogh, Graham Ritter	28	Ford XB Falcon GT Hardtop	J.M. Keogh	A	
DNF	Larry Perkins	35	Holden Torana LH SL/R 5000 L34	N.G.K. Janson	A	
DNF	Dick Johnson	13	Ford Falcon XB GT Hardtop	Bryan Byrt Ford	A	
DNF	Ron Dickson, Fred Gibson	12	Ford Falcon XB GT Hardtop	Pioneer Electronics	A	
DNF	Graeme Blanchard, Scotty Taylor	27	Holden Torana LH SL/R 5000 L34	Graeme Blanchard Holden	A	
DNF	Bruce Hindhaugh	21	Holden Torana LH SL/R 5000 L34	Roadways / Gown-Hindhaugh	A	
DNF	Warren Cullen, Brian Sampson	22	Holden Torana LH SL/R 5000 L34	Pioneer Electronics	A	
DNF	Rusty French, Leo Leonard	23	Ford XC Falcon GS500 Hardtop	Rusty French Racing	A	
DNF	Tim Slako	19	Holden Torana LH SL/R 5000 L34	Philips Industries	A	
DNF	Bob Forbes	11	Holden Torana LH SL/R 5000 L34	Bob Forbes Racing	A	
DNF	Bob Morris	7	Holden Torana LH SL/R 5000 L34	Ron Hodgson Racing	A	
DNF	Kevin Bartlett	9	Ford XB Falcon GT Hardtop	Everlast Battery Service	A	
DNF	Bob Jane, Ian Geoghegan	3	Holden Torana LX SS A9X Hatchback	Bob Jane 2UW Racing	A	
DNF	Graham Ryan, Phillip Arnull	29	Holden Torana LH SL/R 5000 L34	Bond Coats Patents	A	
DNF	Murray Carter	18	Ford XC Falcon GS500 Hardtop	Brian Wood Ford	A	
DNF	Lyndon Arnel	49	Ford Escort RS2000	Bob Holden Shell Sport	C	
DNF	Rod Stevens, Tony Farrell	69	Ford Escort RS2000	Brian Wood Ford	C	
DNF	Geoff Leeds, John Leffler	44	Mazda RX-3	Geoff Leeds Performance Cars	B	
DNF	David Seldon	70	Triumph Dolomite	Ron Hodgson Team Leyland	C	
DNF	Lynn Brown, Bruce Stewart	32	Mazda RX-3	James Mason Motors	B	
DNF	Graeme Lawrence	71	Triumph Dolomite	Ron Hodgson Team Leyland	C	
DNF	Jim Laing-Peach	65	Triumph Dolomite	Ken Mathews Rose Bay	C	
DNF	Graeme Wilson, Maurice Andrews	30	Holden Torana	Tricell Corporation	A	
DNF	Peter Williamson	60	Toyota Celica	Peter Williamson Pty Ltd	C	
DNF	Nick Louis, Ted Brewster	43	Mazda RX-3	Lance Dixon's Great Doncaster Road Motor Show	B	
DNF	Ben Penhall, Garry Cooke	45	Mazda RX-3	Mayrack Manufacturers	B	
DNF	Ian Messner, Bill Stanley	50	Ford Escort RS2000	Bob Holden Shell Spor	C	
DNF	Ian White, John English	58	Ford Escort RS2000	Peak Performance Pty Ltd	C	
DNF	Ray Cutchie	34	Ford Capri V6	R. Cutchie	B	
DNF	Terry Wade, John Myers	54	Triumph Dolomite	B. & G. Meyers Leyland	C	
DNF	Ian Wells, Max McGinley	57	Ford Escort RS2000	I. Wells	C	
DNF	Allan Gough, Kel Gough	73	Isuzu Gemini	Barry Sheales Holden	C	
DNF	Peter Granger, Ian Richards	67	BMW 2002	B. Glazier	C	
DNF	Lou Stoopman, I. Stoopman	66	BMW 2002 Tii	L. Stoopman	C	
DNF	Tony Niovanni	56	Isuzu Gemini	Peter Robinson Holden	C	
DNF	Max Patterson	86	Honda Civic RS	Peninsula Honda	D	
DNF	Ken Harrison	88	Ford Escort	Ken Harrison Shell Sport	D	
DNF	Bernard Stack, Keith Poole	81	Volkswagen Passat	Blackwood Cars Pty Ltd	D	

Preceded by 1976 Hang Ten 400	Sandown 400; 1977	Succeeded by 1978 Hang Ten 400
