= 1979 Australian Championship of Makes =

The 1979 Australian Championship of Makes was a CAMS sanctioned Australian motor racing title open to Group C Touring Cars. It was the ninth manufacturers’ title to be awarded by CAMS and the fourth to carry the Australian Championship of Makes name. The title was awarded to Holden.

== Calendar ==
The 1979 Australian Championship of Makes was contested over a three-round series with one race per round.

Round	Race name	Circuit	State	Date	Winning driver	Winning car	Report
1	Hang Ten 400	Sandown Park	Victoria	9 September	(Australia) Peter Brock	Holden LX Torana SS A9X Hatchback	Report
2	Rothmans 250	Adelaide International Raceway	South Australia	21 October	(Australia) Allan Grice	Holden LX Torana SS A9X Hatchback	
3	Rothmans 300	Surfers Paradise	Queensland	4 November	(Australia) Charlie O'Brien	Holden LX Torana SLR 5000 A9X	

A fourth round, scheduled to be held at Oran Park on 18 November, was cancelled.

== Classes ==
Cars competed in three classes:

- Up to 2000cc
- 2001 to 3000cc
- 3001 to 6000cc

== Points system ==
Championship points were awarded on a 9-6-4-3-2-1 basis to the best six placed cars in each class. Only the highest placed car of each make was awarded points and then only the points applicable to the position filled. The title was awarded to the make of car gaining the highest number of points in the series with all points acquired in all races counted. No drivers' title was allocated or permitted to be advertised in connection with the title.

== Results ==
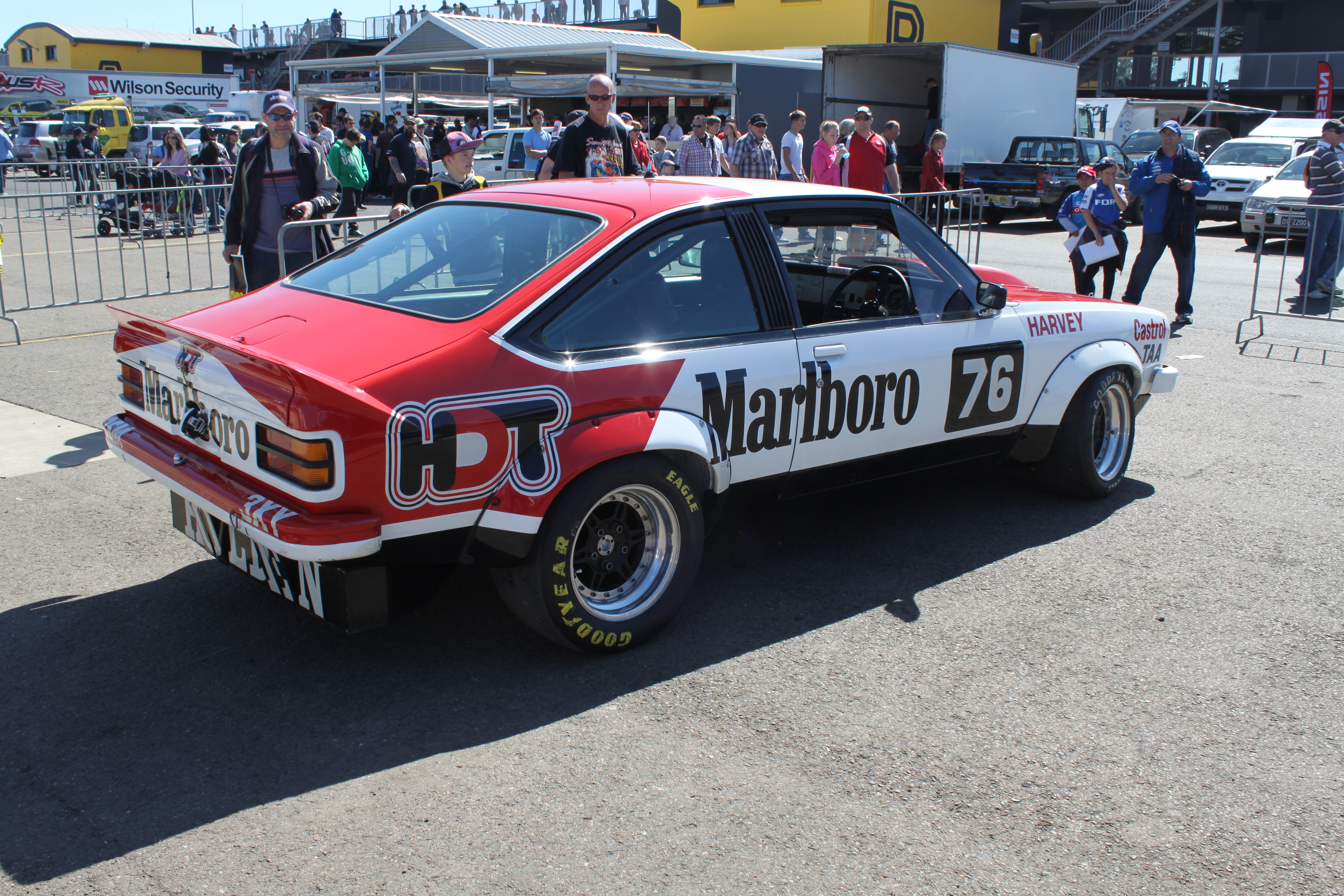
Holden Torana was the dominant car in the series, winning all three rounds and the championship. Image from 2012.

Position	Make	Sandown	Adelaide	Surfers	Total
1	Holden Torana	9	9	9	27
2	Toyota Celica	9	9	9	27
3	Mazda	9	9	4	22
4	Ford Falcon	3	6	6	15
5	Alfa Romeo	3	4	6	13
6	BMW	3	-	-	3
7	Volkswagen	1	-	-	1

Holden Torana and Toyota Celica both achieved maximum points, each winning its class at each of the three rounds. The title was awarded to the former on the grounds that it also featured in the minor placings.

== The cars ==
The following models contributed to the championship pointscores.

- Holden LX Torana SS A9X & Holden LX Torana SLR 5000 A9X
- Toyota Celica RA40
- Mazda RX-3
- Ford XC Falcon
- Alfa Romeo GTV & Alfa Romeo Alfetta GTV
- BMW 3.0
- Volkswagen Golf

It would appear that placings gained by other models from the same manufacturer were not considered in determining championship placings. The first place gained by Ford Capri in the 2001 to 3000cc class at the Surfers Paradise round is an example of this.
