= Peter Brock =

Australian racing driver (1945–2006)

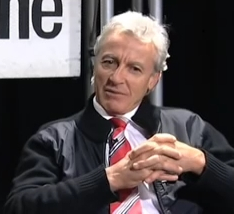
- Brock in 2006
- Born: Peter Geoffrey Brock; 26 February 1945; Richmond, Victoria, Australia
- Died: 8 September 2006 (aged 61); Gidgegannup, Western Australia, Australia
- Known for: Racing driver
- Spouses: Heather Russell (m. 1967–1969) Michelle Downes (m. 1974–1975)
- Partner: Beverly Brock (1978–2005)
- Children: 2
- Relatives: Lewis Brock (brother); Phil Brock (brother); Sandy Brock (nephew)
- Retired: 2004

ATCC / V8 Supercars
- Years active: 1972–1997, 2002, 2004
- Teams: Holden Dealer Team; Gown-Hindhaugh Racing; Team Brock; Perkins Engineering; Advantage Racing; Holden Racing Team; Rod Nash Racing
- Starts: 212
- Wins: 48
- Poles: 57
- Best finish: 1st in 1974, 1978, 1980 Australian Touring Car Championship

Previous series
- 1973 1996 2003–2004: Australian Formula 2 Championship; Australian Super Touring Championship; Australian Nations Cup Championship

Awards
- 2001: V8 Supercars Hall of Fame

Peter Geoffrey Brock AM (26 February 1945 – 8 September 2006), known as "Peter Perfect", "The King of the Mountain", or simply "Brocky", was an Australian motor racing driver. Brock was most often associated with Holden for over 35 years, although he raced vehicles of other manufacturers including BMW, Ford, Volvo, Porsche and Peugeot. He won the Bathurst 1000 endurance race nine times, the Sandown 500 touring car race nine times, the Australian Touring Car Championship three times, the Bathurst 24 Hour once and was inducted into the V8 Supercars Hall of Fame in 2001. Brock's business activities included the Holden Dealer Team (HDT) that produced Brock's racing machines as well as a number of modified high-performance road versions of his racing cars.

== Early years ==
Peter Brock was born at the Epworth Hospital, Richmond, Victoria, the son of Geoff and Ruth Brock (née Laidlay). The family lived in the country town of Hurstbridge (now an outer suburb of Melbourne) and Brock continued to live there throughout his life. He attended Eltham High School in Eltham, Victoria. His first car was an Austin 7 that he bought for £5 (A$10). He claimed that his driving skill improved at this point of his life because the car did not have brakes (or a body, which was removed with his father's axe).

Brock was drafted into the Australian Army in 1965 and spent his two years of National Service stationed at the Blamey Barracks near Wagga Wagga in New South Wales. During his time in the army, Brock was against the federal government's plan to send conscripts to Vietnam. Brock was in the Medical Corps where he often served as an ambulance driver. According to his brother Lewis, Brock and his mates used to race the ambulances around the base. Although they did not know each other at the time, also stationed at the Barracks from 1965 to 1967 was a young Dick Johnson who from the 1980s would go on to be one of Brock's chief touring car rivals.

It was while on leave from the army in 1966 that Brock first visited Bathurst to watch the 500-mile production car race that was to become the Bathurst 1000. It was after watching the race that he decided that he wanted to become a race driver when he left the army. His brother Phil also became a racing driver, and co-drove with his brother in the Bathurst 1000 on two occasions.

== Racing career ==
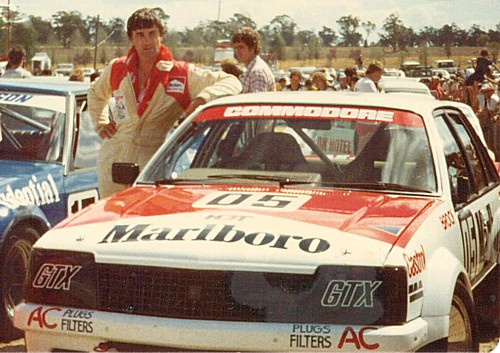
Brock at Symmons Plains 1982

During his early career Brock raced some "wild and woolly" creations including the famous blue 6-cylinder Holden-powered Austin A30. Brock rose to public attention in touring car racing.

=== Bathurst ===
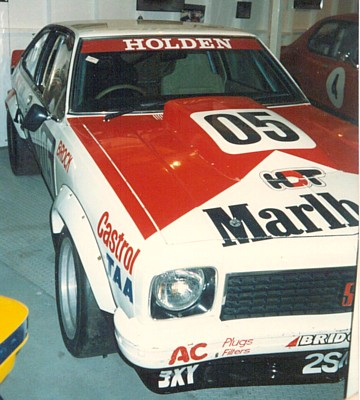
Brock's Bathurst winning Torana

Brock made his debut at Bathurst in the 1969 Hardie-Ferodo 500 in a Holden HT Monaro GTS 350 alongside Des West, with the pair finishing third behind their winning HDT teammates Colin Bond and Tony Roberts. He won the Bathurst 500 for the first time in 1972 (the last year the race was run over 500 miles and the last year in which driving solo was permitted).

Brock would win the event a total of nine times between 1972 and 1987, a feat that has not been equalled. His 1979 win was remarkable in that he and co-driver Jim Richards claimed victory by six laps, a record that, due to changes in race regulations introduced in the mid- to late 1980s, most notably the introduction of the Safety Car in 1987, may never be broken, and broke the circuit lap record for touring cars on the 163rd and final lap of the race (the record would stand until Brock himself broke it in 1982). Brock had tried to set the lap record on the final lap of the 1978 race, but he was inadvertently baulked by the Alfa Romeo of Ray Gulson through The Dipper. In 32 starts at Bathurst, he claimed pole position a record six times (1974, 1977, 1978, 1979, 1983 and 1989), with all bar his 1989 pole in a Ford Sierra RS500 being for Holden. Brock also sat on pole for the 1997 V8 Supercars race but the time was set by his co-driver Mark Skaife. His record at this race earned him the popular nickname King of the Mountain.

Peter Brock also won the second (and last) Bathurst 24 Hour race in 2003 driving a 7.0L V8-powered Holden Monaro 427C for Garry Rogers Motorsport. Brock won the race, which although not the Bathurst 1000, he regarded as his tenth Bathurst win driving alongside V8 Supercar drivers Greg Murphy, Jason Bright and Todd Kelly. The #05 Monaro won the race by less than half a second from the 2002 race winning GRM Monaro 427C driven by Nathan Pretty, Garth Tander, Steven Richards and Cameron McConville. The two Monaros finished 12 laps in front of the third-placed Porsche 996 GT3 RC of Peter Fitzgerald, Paul Morris, John Teulan and Scott Shearman.

=== Sandown ===
Along with his record at the Bathurst race, Brock also claimed victory in the traditional lead up race to Bathurst, the Sandown 500, nine times, including a string of seven consecutive wins from 1975 until 1981. He won a total of 37 races during his career in the Australian Touring Car/V8 Supercar championships, a record only eventually equalled by Mark Skaife in 2006 and beaten in 2007.

=== Other Australian racing ===
Brock had a brief foray into Open wheel racing when he raced a Ford powered Birrana 273 to 8th place in the 1973 Australian Formula 2 Championship. Although he had some minor, non-championship wins in the car, his best placing in the national championship series was second behind series champion Leo Geoghegan in Round 2 or Oran Park in Sydney. Brock's HDT boss Harry Firth later told that he let Brock race the Birrana to get formula racing "out of his system". Later in early 1984, Brock tested a Ralt RT4 with a view to possibly driving one in the 1984 Australian Drivers' Championship and the end of year Australian Grand Prix (which at the time were run to Formula Mondial rules), and put in some competitive lap times at Calder Park. However, he later decided that with the road car business, touring car commitments and the planned Sports Car races at Silverstone and Le Mans, he simply could not devote enough time to the project to make it worth doing.

Brock and the Holden Dealer Team worked in partnership, with full factory approval and assistance, to produce a number of high-performance modifications to the Commodores under existing CAMS Group C regulations from 1980 to 1987. Some of these were HDT "homologation specials", one step away from race cars. It was around this time that Brock began his run of six Bathurst 1000 wins in seven years with a pair of hat trick wins from 1978 to 1980 (with Jim Richards) and 1982 to '84 (with Larry Perkins and John Harvey), including his record-breaking six-lap victory in the 1979 event.

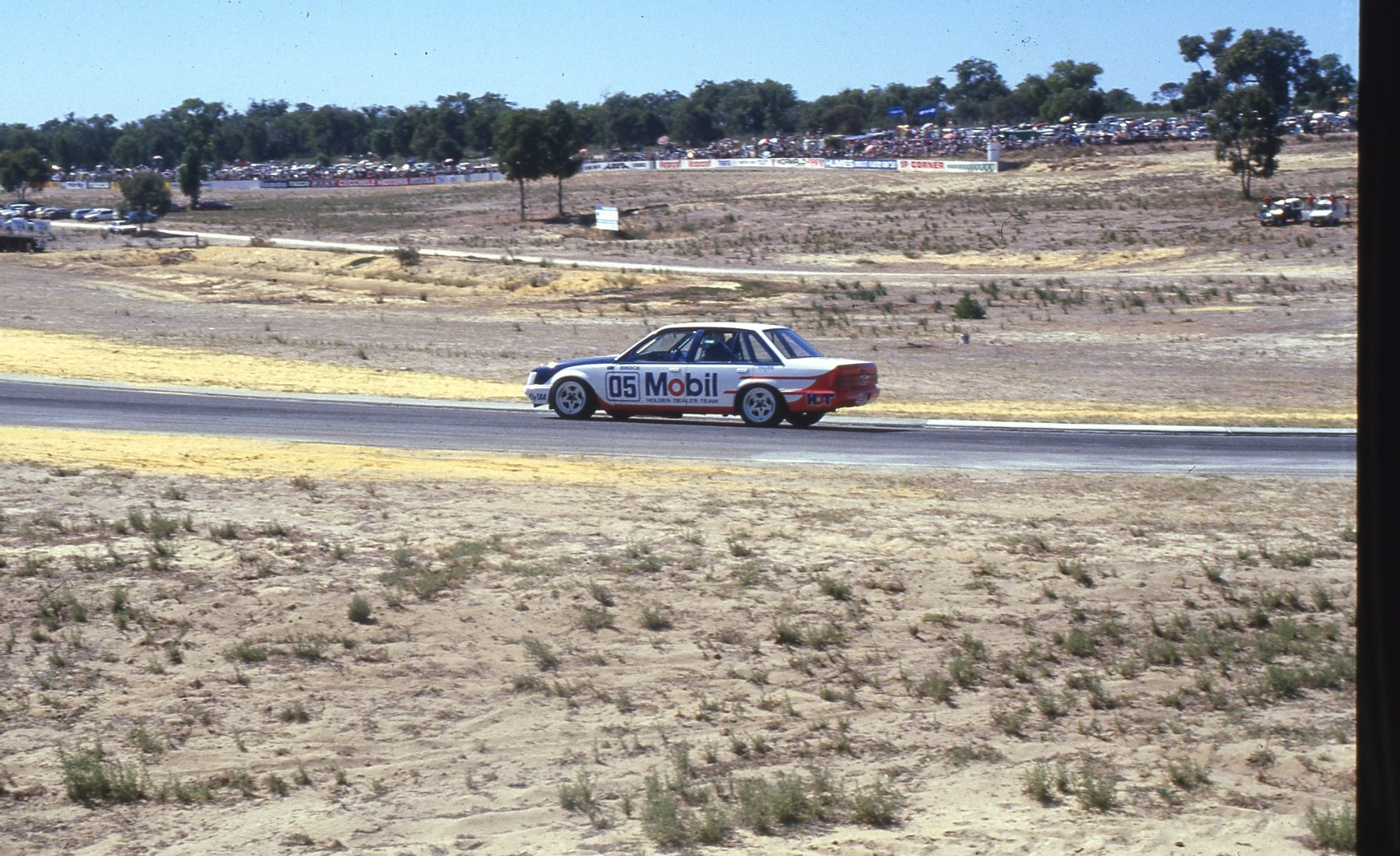
Peter Brock racing at Wanneroo Park in 1985 in a Holden Commodore VK

While Brock was always typecast in a Holden, he did have 'brief flirtations' with other makes in touring car racing. After his 1987 Holden split, he campaigned a BMW M3 in 1988, becoming the official BMW Australia backed team for the year (his only win in the BMW would be in the 1988 Pepsi 250 at Oran Park), before driving a Ford Sierra RS500 in 1989 and 1990. As the turbo-charged Sierras were the Group A cars to have at the time it was seen as a logical move to return to the front end of the field.

During 1988 Brock also campaigned a V8 Ford XF Falcon in the Calder Park Thunderdome-based AUSCAR series, though unlike touring car rivals such as Jim Richards, Allan Grice and Brad Jones, Brock's foray into Superspeedway racing was brief. He attempted the 1988 NASCAR Christmas 500 at Calder Park, but failed to qualify.

With the increasing costs of running two Sierras, and with the teams technical support from the UK-based Andy Rouse also stopping thanks to Rouse moving to drive for Toyota, Brock returned to driving a Holden in 1991, teaming with former HDT co-driver Perkins (who had left the HDT in mid-1985) to run a pair of VN SS Group A Commodores. The association with Perkins Engineering only lasted for one year, though Brock continued to run the ATCC driving in Commodores.

A further flirtation away from Holden was in 1994 when he raced a Volvo 850 in the one-off Eastern Creek 12-Hour. He also competed for the same Volvo Dealer Racing team in the Australian Super Touring Championship in 1996, finishing 6th in the championship with a best finish of second in Round 7 at Lakeside in Brisbane.

=== International racing ===
Brock's first international race came in 1971 when Harry Firth made a late decision to enter the HDT in the Guia touring car Race at the Macau Grand Prix. Driving one of the team's old Series Production LC Torana GTR XU-1s, Brock finished second behind 1971 European Touring Car Champion Dieter Glemser, who according to Brock in his regular "Auto Action" column, drove a full works Ford Capri 2600. Ford rival Allan Moffat also raced in his GTHO Falcon, but struggled throughout the meeting with tyre troubles and wasn't a factor in the race being some 20 seconds per lap slower than the Torana. Brock claimed that scrutineering was almost non-existent at Macau, while Firth would describe Glemser's Capri and the Alfa Romeo GTA of third placed Hong Kong driver Albert Poon as "pretty damned rude" for not being strictly production cars as they were supposed to be.

Unlike several other Australian drivers, including Alan Jones and Larry Perkins, Brock did not seek a full-time racing career outside Australia. He did attempt the 24 Hours of Le Mans three times in privateer vehicles, firstly in 1976 in the Team Brock BMW 3.0CSL which was bought in South Africa in late 1975 and shipped to Melbourne, where it was completely stripped and rebuilt. His co-driver was former Aussie and UK resident Brian Muir with the BMW lasting 17 hours before a head gasket blew. He then returned for the 1981 race teamed with former HDT teammate Colin Bond and Bathurst co-driver Jim Richards in the Porsche Cars Australia #74 Porsche 924 Carrera GTR but while the team practised, they were only named as a reserve, not participating in the race itself.

While at the 1983 Australian Grand Prix meeting at Calder Park, sports car racer and 1976 Hardie-Ferodo 1000 winner John Fitzpatrick challenged Brock, that having won everything there was to win in Australia he should try his hand overseas with the 'big boys', meaning Le Mans. After millionaire businessman and racer Bob Jane got involved with sponsorship through his Bob Jane T-Marts, a deal was completed to race a Porsche 956B rented from John Fitzpatrick Racing in 1984. This car was a well-worn 956, chassis number 956-102 previously seen in J. David and Skoal Bandit colours. With regular HDT co-driver Larry Perkins, Brock finished 21st at the 1000 km of Silverstone after spending time in the pits fixing a broken rear suspension. The pair then drove in the 24 Hours of Le Mans. Perkins qualified the car 15th with a time of 3:35.340 which was 18.29 seconds slower than the pole winning works Lancia LC2 of Bob Wollek (Brock was 2 seconds slower than Perkins, though his times were set on race tyres while Perkins was given a set of qualifiers). After a good start by Perkins in the hot conditions, Team Australia were running as high as 5th at one stage of the race before retiring after Perkins crashed in the Esses on lap 145 while trying to make up for lost time, which included a lost wheel while Brock was in the car, and a broken rear bolt which caused Perkins to almost spin the Porsche at close to 350 km/h (217 mph) while racing flat out through the kink on the famous Mulsanne Straight. The Team Australia assault on the race, and the fortunes of the other Aussies including 1983 winner Vern Schuppan, 1980 Formula One World Champion Alan Jones and Allan Grice, was covered extensively in the Peter Mckay/Barry Naismith book "LeMans The Australian Assault".

While in Europe in 1984, Brock was in the unusual situation (for him) of being the second billing in his driver pairing with Perkins. From 1974 until 1977 Larry Perkins had made 11 starts in F1 and, to the large number of European motoring press covering the two World Endurance Championship races, ex-F1 driver Larry 'Larrikins' Perkins was the star driver with Brock seen as nothing more than a saloon car driver. According to Perkins, "The Porsche exercise at Le Mans was great although PB (Brock) struggled with the 'Euro media' because no one knew who he was!"

Brock also drove a Vauxhall Magnum with British driver Gerry Marshall to a surprise second place in the 1977 Spa 24 Hours. He also shocked many when he won the 1979 Repco Round Australia Trial driving for the HDT in a 6cyl Holden VB Commodore along with co-drivers Noel Richards and Matthew Philip. The shock came as many in the motoring press regarded Brock as a circuit racer and seemed forgot about his extensive Rally and Rallycross experience with the Dealer Team in the early 1970s. The press saw his inclusion merely as a publicity stunt by Holden and the race organisers in order to generate interest in the race. The Repco was a long-distance endurance rally that drove clockwise around Australia featuring some dirt road sections completely different to the circuit racing where he made his name. The Round Australia Trial was revived in 1995 (sponsored by Brock's long time backer Mobil) with Brock again racing for Holden in a Holden Racing Team prepared VR Commodore. Brock finished 3rd in the trial which was won by teammate (and former Australian Rally Champion) Ed Ordynski.

=== Retirement activities ===
After 1991 when teamed with Perkins Engineering, Brock continued to race in his own privately supported Advantage Racing Commodores in 1992 and 1993, before joining the factory Holden Racing Team in 1994. Brock retired from full-time driving following the 1997 Australian Touring Car season.

In the 1998 PlayStation Rally, formerly known as the Australian Safari, Brock Competed in the Production Class, racing a showroom-condition Holden Jackaroo, with only safety modifications fitted to the vehicle. Alongside co-driver Wayne Webster, Brock took on the 22-day event, which covered over 18,000 kilometres starting in Adelaide and circumnavigating Australia. Despite the Jackaroo's standard production specifications, Brock and Webster performed exceptionally well, finishing second overall and winning the Production Class.

After his nominal 'retirement' he made two returns to Bathurst. In 2002 he paired with Team Brock lead driver Craig Baird to a 23rd-place finish in the teams Commodore VX, Brock finished 25 laps down due to engine temperature problems. He then returned to the Holden Racing team for the 2004 Bathurst 1000, teaming with Jason Plato in a Commodore VY. The pair failed to finish after Plato was involved in a spectacular accident coming out of Caltex Chase with the Brad Jones Racing Falcon of John Cleland while Cleland was lapping the Commodore (which was limping to the pits with a blown tyre) on lap 29. The clash caused the Falcon to roll and enough damage to the HRT car to be out on the spot with Brock failing to get a drive in his last Bathurst race after Plato had started the car and was due to hand over to Brock a few laps after the crash.

Brock also drove a Holden Monaro 427C for Garry Rogers Motorsport (GRM), winning four from four races in what was thought to be a one-off appearance in the support races for the 2003 Australian Grand Prix in Melbourne. This led to him driving a 2nd Monaro built and run by GRM in the Australian Nations Cup Championship, a GT-type championship for highly modified and exotic road cars in 2003 before setting up his own team for himself and stepson James in 2004 (with Monaros supplied by GRM). He achieved a tenth Bathurst endurance win in 2003 at the Bathurst 24 Hour, when he won, with Greg Murphy, Jason Bright and Todd Kelly in his GRM Monaro, controversially powered by a 7.0L 427 cui V8 engine rather than the 5.7L Gen III as used by the production Monaro CV8 (the controversy came from no other car in Nations Cup being able to run a different size engine from the production model it was based on. Triple Nations Cup champion Jim Richards labelled the Monaro as a "Better V8 Supercar" when it first appeared at the 2002 Bathurst 24 Hour).

In 2002, he returned to top-level touring car racing as a team patron with Rod Nash Racing in V8 Supercar Commodore and drove in that year's Bathurst 1000 with the team was renamed 'Team Brock' as a branding exercise. The 'Team Brock' branding exercise was revived for 2003 this time with Paul Weel Racing but this time Brock's role was as a mentor rather than a driver. Frustrated with the lack of control he held over a team bearing his name, Brock and the team parted company at the end of the season.

He occasionally competed in various enthusiast-level motorsport events such as the Targa Tasmania with the Monaros he drove actually constructed by Holden Special Vehicles. His smooth on-camera persona and familiarity to older Australians continued to sell products, including Mobil (including a 2000 United States television commercial) and Bridgestone tyres, as the controversy of the Energy Polarizer had been largely forgotten.

== Other activities ==
=== Motor safety campaign ===
Brock worked with the Victorian authorities promoting the campaign against drink-driving. The most obvious sign of this association was the race car number 05 which related to the 0.05% blood alcohol limit in Victoria, which he utilised constantly from the mid-1970s. Most cars he raced in, regardless of the motor racing division, bore this number, including the car in which he died.

=== Car modifications ===
Brock began publicly supporting and, eventually, began to fit to all Holden Dealer Team specials a device called the "Energy Polariser" containing crystals and magnets in an epoxy resin that, it was claimed, improved the performance and handling of vehicles through "aligning the molecules". The device was based on the principles of the orgone energy pseudoscience. The "Polariser" is being sold once more in an official HDT, Brock tribute upgrade pack.

The overwhelming majority of the Australian motoring community regarded the device as pseudoscience, and Brock's promotion of it drove away HDT drivers like John Harvey, Allan Moffat and Larry Perkins. Brock also recommended tyre pressures of 22psi (150kPa) for his polariser-equipped vehicles, a level which many regarded as near-dangerously low. Holden, fearing the consequences of being associated with the device and a resulting breakdown in communications over Brock's plans for new models, cut ties with Brock and set up an alternative racing/modification operation, Holden Special Vehicles. During this period, Brock also became involved in the importation and even the modification of the Lada Samara, a cheap Soviet-built hatchback a world away from the high-performance V8-powered Commodores he was famous for. The Lada deal came at the right time for the Brock organisation as it saved the struggling outfit from potential bankruptcy.

After his work with Lada, Brock, during the period 1988–1990 sold around 200 personally modified EA-series Ford Falcons, Fairmont Ghias, Fairlanes and Mavericks through Austech Automotive Developments.

=== Media work ===
Due to his extraordinary success on the racing track Brock became the Australian racing driver with the highest-profile as he undertook several media commitments. When not racing he often appeared on New Zealand television screens as a presenter; hosting motoring shows such as TV3's Police Stop (1996–1998) and TVNZ's Love That Car (2000). In Australia, Brock hosted a show similar to Police Stop known as Police Camera Action which was shown on the Seven Network (1996–98).

Brock has been the subject of several DVD documentaries—The Legend (1997; updated 2004), Peter Brock - Nine Times a Champion, Holden First Around Australia (Repco Trial VB Commodore), 25 Years of HDT Special Vehicles Collectors Edition (2006) and 35 Years on the Mountain (2005). He was also due to star in a racing film King of the Mountain in early 2007.

=== The Peter Brock Foundation ===
He announced to a packed race track he was forming 'The Peter Brock Foundation', a philanthropic organisation funded by corporate sponsors and donations from the public. Aimed at disadvantaged youth and others experiencing difficulties in Australia. As of 2021 the Foundation still continues operating and has financed many activities and people.

=== Standing in community ===
As the lead driver for the Holden Dealer Team in a succession of both 6- and 8-cylinder Holden Toranas and, later, V8 Commodores, Brock became a household name in Australasian motor racing. He was spoken of in the same company as Formula One World Champions Jack Brabham, Alan Jones and Denny Hulme.

In 1986, Brock was crowned King of Moomba by the Melbourne-based festival committee.

Brock was a strong supporter of the Liberal Party of Australia and appeared in election advertisements for Primer Minister Malcolm Fraser. His race cars were sponsored by radio station 3XY which at the time was owned by the Liberal Party. Federal Liberal Minister for Tourism Fran Bailey delivered a eulogy at his state funeral noting his support for her election campaigns.

His public standing was dented by controversy over his promotion of the "Energy Polariser" and domestic violence allegations levelled by an ex-wife, with calls to keep him out of the Australian Motor Sport Hall of Fame.

== Personal life ==
=== Relationships ===
Brock married Heather Russell in 1967. The marriage ended in divorce two years later.

Several years later, Brock met 1973 Miss Australia pageant winner and Channel Seven weather presenter Michelle Downes. They married in April 1974 and divorced after only one year. In 2006, Downes said Brock assaulted her on a number of occasions, and forced her to have an abortion.

Brock next entered into a relationship with Beverly "Bev" McIntosh, the wife of a member of his motor racing team. After two failed marriages, Brock was hesitant to marry McIntosh; and, although the couple never married, Peter always called Bev his "wife", and she changed her surname to Brock by deed poll. They had two children together. Her oldest, James, is Bev's son from a previous marriage. Bev wrote Peter's biography herself in 2004 after finding most potential authors had incorrect preconceived notions about him. She also expressed a desire to show his human side, to encourage others that they, too, can achieve their goals. "Even Allan Moffat said it's okay for him—it's us mortals that have the problem," she said. Bev described Brock as an imperfect but never violent man.

Brock split with Bev in May 2005 after 28 years together. Their daughter gave birth to their grandson in 2006, two months before Brock's death. According to Bev, Brock was not an entirely faithful partner. She has described in a book her eventual tiring in the early 1990s of his relationships with "one too many secretaries".

After splitting with Bev, Peter began a relationship with Julie Bamford, whom he had met through his former partner Bev some 20 years previously. Subsequently, Bamford's estranged husband Ron McCurdy, who had once been a close friend of Brock's, assaulted Brock during a chance meeting outside the Peter Brock Foundation's office.

=== Lifestyle ===
Brock, who lived hard in his early years, changed his lifestyle considerably after the failed 1984 Le Mans attempt left him physically and emotionally drained.

After his return from Le Mans, Brock began to consult Melbourne-based chiropractor Eric Dowker. He gave up alcohol and cigarettes and became a vegetarian; five years later he became a vegan. Eventually he returned to being a vegetarian.

== Death ==
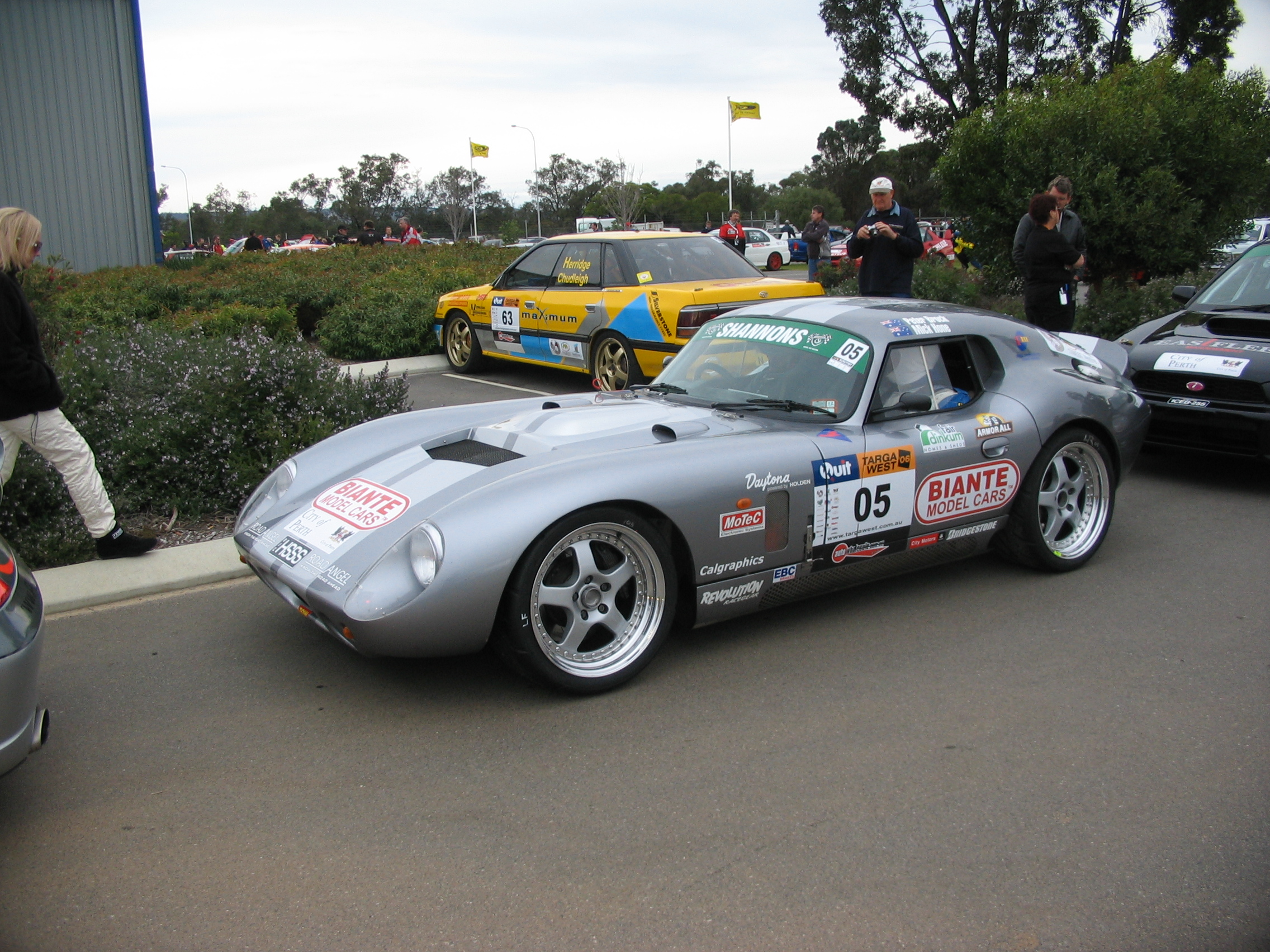
Peter Brock's Daytona Sportscar - the day before the accident.

On 8 September 2006, while driving in the Targa West '06 rally, Brock was 3 kilometres (2 mi) from the finish of the second stage of the race at Gidgegannup, about 40 kilometres (25 mi) from Perth, when he skidded off a downhill left-hand bend on Clenton Road for over 50 metres (160 ft; 55 yd) in his 2001 Daytona Sportscar and hit a tree sideways, in the driver's door. The 61-year-old Brock died within minutes of the impact. His co-driver, Mick Hone, was taken to hospital in a serious but stable condition. Video footage of the crash (provided by a fan and the in-car camera) was reviewed by Western Australian police to help determine the cause of the crash. Coroner Alastair Hope decided that his death was caused by high speed and that no coronial inquest would be held. The video was not released to the public.

Brock's children accepted the offer of a Victorian state funeral, with former partner Bev telling ABC Radio:

"[Brock] was loved. He was in the public eye, and everything had to be done with a flourish and with a bang. It's probably the way he would want to go out (and how), he would want to be remembered."

The editor of Wheels Magazine, Ged Bulmer, said that Brock would be remembered for his nine victories at Bathurst, for "He had a long and very successful career there, he was the 'King of the Mountain' as he came to be known."

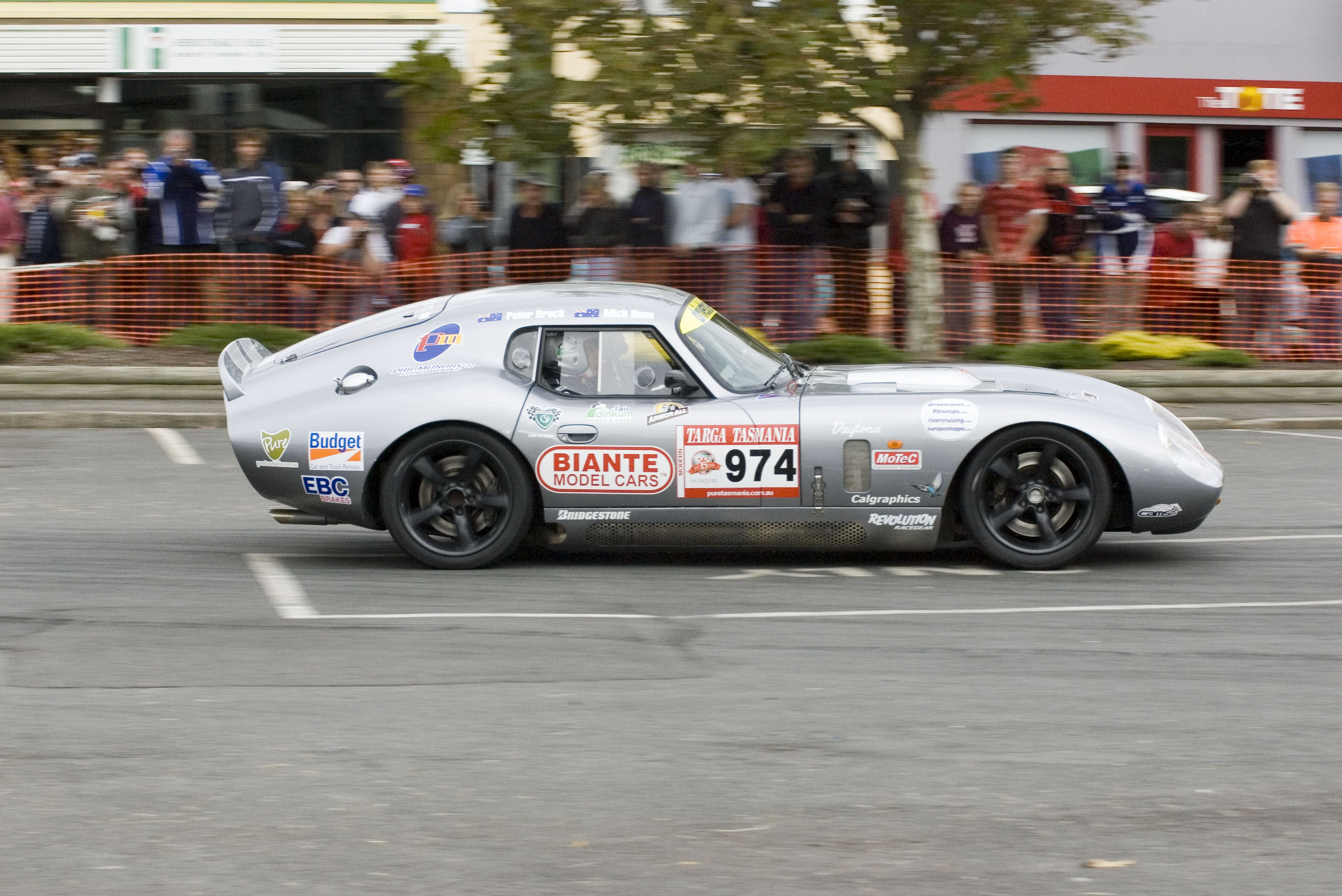
Peter Brock in the Daytona Coupe racing in Targa Tasmania 2006

Brock was farewelled with a state funeral at Melbourne's St. Paul's Anglican Cathedral, on 19 September 2006. A permanent memorial was placed at Peter Brock's "home" raceway, Sandown Raceway, on 22 September.

=== Estate ===
Brock left three wills and a complex estate. The court battle between his family members was protracted and took over three years to complete.

== Legacy ==
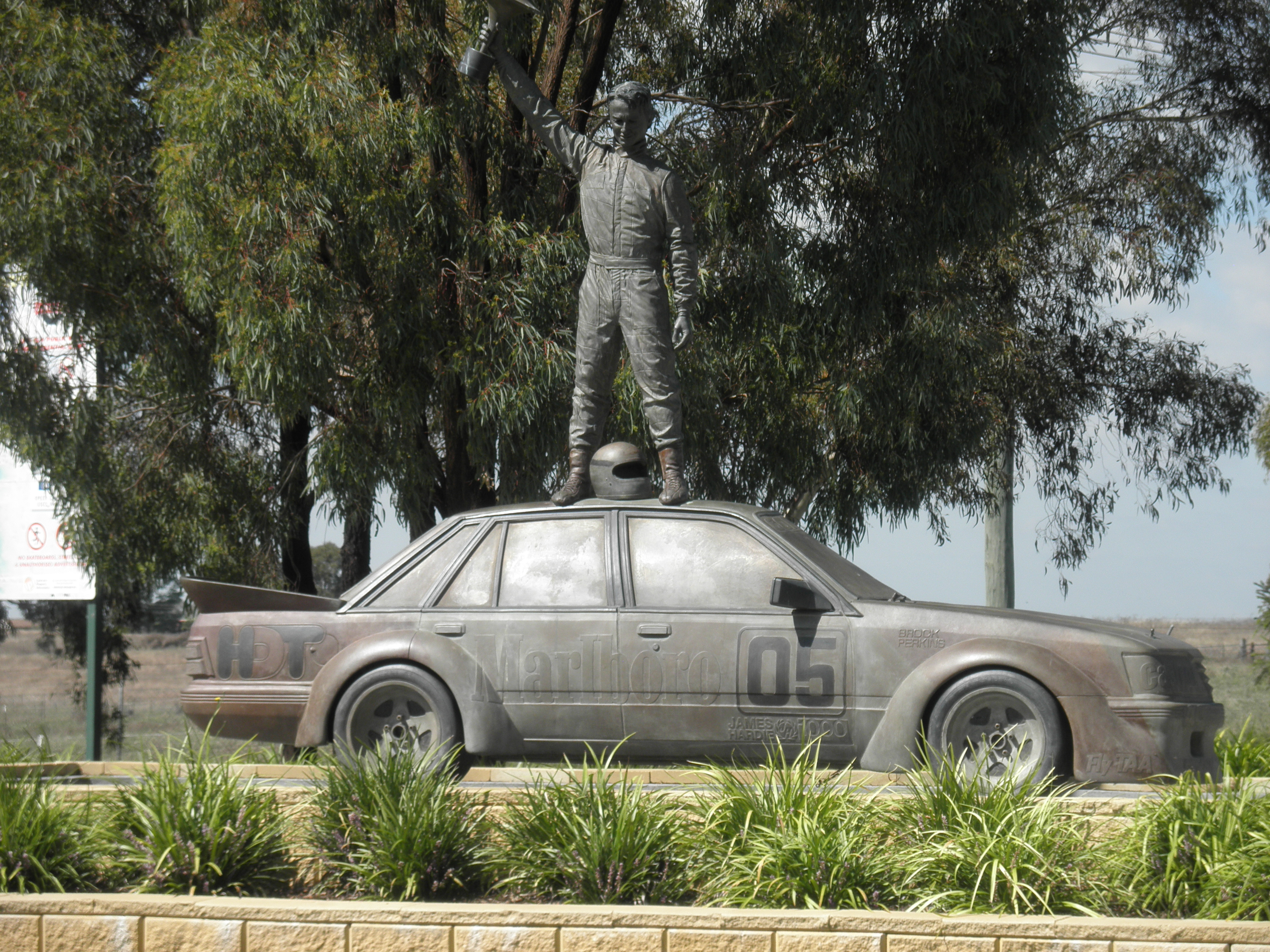
The Peter Brock Memorial at the National Motor Racing Museum in Bathurst.

In honour of his achievements and in recognition of his contribution to Australian motorsport, the Bathurst 1000 winner's trophy now carries his name. The Peter Brock Trophy was first incorporated for the 2006 Bathurst 1000. The race was won by Craig Lowndes and Jamie Whincup driving a Ford BA Falcon. Lowndes had long been regarded as Brock's protégé, and was a teammate of Brock in 1996. Lowndes and Whincup would go on to win three Bathurst 1000s in succession, matching the feat that Brock achieved twice.

Next to the site of his most famous motor racing achievements at Mount Panorama, a memorial statue was built adjacent to the National Motor Racing Museum in Bathurst. Unveiled in 2008, the statue features Brock standing on his 1984 Bathurst-winning Holden VK Commodore. Two roads in Sydney have been named Peter Brock Drive: in Oran Park as part of the housing development that replaced Oran Park Raceway, and in Eastern Creek, near Sydney Motorsport Park. In 1997, the Skyline section at the top of the Mount Panorama race track was renamed Brock's Skyline in his honor.

A two-part television miniseries entitled Brock was aired on Network Ten in October 2016, with Matthew Le Nevez playing the title character. However, the miniseries received criticism for trivialising and titillating his life.

== Awards ==
In addition to his racing championships, Brock's efforts to society have been recognised in various ways:

- Member of the Order of Australia (9 June 1980) – AM QB80. For service to the sport of motor racing.
- Bent Spoon Award (1986) Awarded by the Australian Skeptics for his promotion of the "Energy Polariser" device.
- Australian Sports Medal (24 October 2000)
- Centenary Medal (1 January 2001) For outstanding service to the community through fundraising.
- National Service Medal (14 February 2006) – For Military Service (1965–67)
- Simeone Foundation Spirit of Competition Award (2016)

== Career results ==
Season	Series	Position	Car	Team
1971	Victorian Rallycross Championship	1st	Holden LC Torana GTR	Holden Dealer Team
1972	South Pacific Touring Series	=4th	Holden LJ Torana GTR XU-1	Holden Dealer Team
1973	Australian Formula 2 Championship	8th	Birrana 273 Ford	Team Brock
1973	Australian Touring Car Championship	2nd	Holden LJ Torana GTR XU-1	Holden Dealer Team
1973	South Pacific Touring Series	1st	Holden LJ Torana GTR XU-1	Holden Dealer Team
1974	Australian Touring Car Championship	1st	Holden LJ Torana GTR XU-1; Holden LH Torana SL/R 5000	Holden Dealer Team
1974	South Pacific Touring Series	1st	Holden LJ Torana GTR XU-1	Holden Dealer Team
1975	Australian Touring Car Championship	7th	Holden LH Torana SL/R 5000 L34	Gown - Hindhaugh
1976	Australian Touring Car Championship	6th	Holden LH Torana SL/R 5000 L34	Team Brock
1977	Australian Touring Car Championship	3rd	Holden LH Torana SL/R 5000 L34; Holden LX Torana SS A9X Hatchback	Bill Patterson Holden
1978	Australian Touring Car Championship	1st	Holden LX Torana SLR A9X; Holden LX Torana SS A9X Hatchback	Holden Dealer Team
1979	Australian Touring Car Championship	2nd	Holden LX Torana SS A9X Hatchback	Holden Dealer Team
1980	Australian Touring Car Championship	1st	Holden VB Commodore	Holden Dealer Team
1981	Australian Touring Car Championship	2nd	Holden VC Commodore	Marlboro Holden Dealer Team
1982	Australian Touring Car Championship	5th	Holden VC Commodore; Holden VH Commodore SS	Marlboro Holden Dealer Team
1982	Better Brakes AMSCAR Series	7th	Holden VC Commodore	Marlboro Holden Dealer Team
1982	Australian GT Championship	5th	Chevrolet Monza	Bob Jane T-Marts
1982	Australian Endurance Championship	7th	Holden VH Commodore SS	Marlboro Holden Dealer Team
1983	Australian Touring Car Championship	3rd	Holden VH Commodore SS	Marlboro Holden Dealer Team
1983	Australian Endurance Championship	8th	Holden VH Commodore SS	Marlboro Holden Dealer Team
1984	Australian Touring Car Championship	2nd	Holden VH Commodore SS	Marlboro Holden Dealer Team
1984	Australian Endurance Championship	3rd	Holden VH Commodore SS; Holden VK Commodore	Marlboro Holden Dealer Team
1985	Australian Touring Car Championship	3rd	Holden VK Commodore	Holden Dealer Team
1985	Australian Endurance Championship	5th	Holden VK Commodore	Holden Dealer Team
1986	Nissan-Mobil 500 Series	4th	Holden VK Commodore SS Group A	Holden Dealer Team
1986	Australian Touring Car Championship	5th	Holden VK Commodore SS Group A	Holden Dealer Team
1986	Australian Endurance Championship	7th	Holden VK Commodore SS Group A	Holden Dealer Team
1987	Nissan-Mobil 500 Series	1st	Holden VK Commodore SS Group A	Holden Dealer Team
1987	Australian Touring Car Championship	7th	Holden VK Commodore SS Group A Holden VL Commodore SS Group A	Holden Dealer Team
1988	Australian Touring Car Championship	5th	BMW M3	Mobil 1 Racing
1988	Asia-Pacific Touring Car Championship	8th	BMW M3	Mobil 1 Racing
1989	Australian Touring Car Championship	3rd	Ford Sierra RS500	Mobil 1 Racing
1989	Nissan-Mobil 500 Series	1st	Ford Sierra RS500	Mobil 1 Racing
1990	Australian Touring Car Championship	2nd	Ford Sierra RS500	Mobil 1 Racing
1990	Australian Endurance Championship	2nd	Ford Sierra RS500	Mobil 1 Racing
1991	Australian Touring Car Championship	6th	Holden VN Commodore SS Group A SV	Mobil 1 Racing
1991	Australian Endurance Championship	20th	Holden VN Commodore SS Group A SV	Mobil 1 Racing
1991	Nissan-Mobil 500 Series	3rd	Holden VN Commodore SS Group A SV	Mobil Holden Dealer Team
1992	Australian Touring Car Championship	11th	Holden VN Commodore SS Group A SV	Mobil 1 Racing
1992	Nissan-Mobil 500 Series	2nd	Holden VP Commodore	Mobil Holden Dealer Team
1993	Australian Touring Car Championship	8th	Holden VP Commodore	Mobil 1 Racing
1994	Australian Touring Car Championship	3rd	Holden VP Commodore	Holden Racing Team
1995	Australian Touring Car Championship	3rd	Holden VR Commodore	Holden Racing Team
1996	Australian Touring Car Championship	4th	Holden VR Commodore	Holden Racing Team
1996	Australian Super Touring Championship	6th	Volvo 850	Volvo Dealer Racing
1997	Australian Touring Car Championship	6th	Holden VS Commodore	Holden Racing Team
2002	V8 Supercar Championship Series	68th	Holden VX Commodore	Team Brock
2003	Australian Nations Cup Championship	4th	Holden Monaro 427C	Garry Rogers Motorsport
2004	Australian Nations Cup Championship	6th	Holden Monaro 427C	Team Brock
2004	V8Supercar Championship Series	58th	Holden VY Commodore	Holden Racing Team
2004	Biante Historic Touring Car Series	17th	Holden LJ Torana GTR XU-1	

=== Complete Australian Touring Car Championship results ===
(key) (Races in bold indicate pole position) (Races in italics indicate fastest lap)

Year	Team	Car	1	2	3	4	5	6	7	8	9	10	11	12	13	14	15	16	17	18	19	20	21	22	23	24	25	26	27	28	29	30	DC	Points
1973	Holden Dealer Team	Holden LJ Torana GTR XU-1	SYM; R1; 2	CAL; R2; Ret	SAN; R3; Ret	WAN; R4; 2	SUR; R5; 1	AIR; R6; 1	ORA; R7; DSQ	WAR; R8; 1																							2nd	57
1974	Marlboro Holden Dealer Team	Holden LJ Torana GTR XU-1	SYM; R1; 1	CAL; R2; 1	SAN; R3; 3	AMA; R4; 1	ORA; R5; 2	SUR; R6; 1	AIR; R7; 1																								1st	80
1975	Gown-Hindhaugh	Holden LH Torana SL/R 5000 L34	SYM; R1; Ret	CAL; R2; 2	AMA; R3; Ret	ORA; R4; Ret	SUR; R5; 2	SAN; R6	AIR; R7; Ret	LAK; R8; 2																							7th	27
1976	Team Brock	Holden LH Torana SL/R 5000 L34	SYM; R1	CAL; R2; 4	ORA; R3	SAN; R4; 2	AMA; R5	AIR; R6	LAK; R7	SAN; R8; 1	AIR; R9	SUR; R10; 1	PHI; R11; Ret																				5th	45
1977	Bill Patterson Holden	Holden LH Torana SL/R 5000 L34	SYM; R1; 3	CAL; R2; 3	ORA; R3; 3	AMA; R4; 7	SAN; R5; 4	AIR; R6; 3	LAK; R7; 1	SAN; R8; 1	AIR; R9; 9	SUR; R10; 3	PHI; R11; Ret																				3rd	65
1978	Holden Dealer Team	Holden LX Torana SS 5000 A9X	SYM; R1; 1	ORA; R2; 1	AMA; R3; 3	SAN; R4; DSQ	WAN; R5; 1	CAL; R6	LAK; R7; 4	AIR; R8; 3																							1st	55
1979	Holden Dealer Team	Holden LX Torana SS 5000 A9X	SYM; R1; 4	CAL; R2; 1	ORA; R3; 3	SAN; R4; 3	WAN; R5; 1	SUR; R6; 1	LAK; R7; 5	AIR; R8; 2																							2nd	62
1980	Holden Dealer Team	Holden VB Commodore	SYM; R1; 1	CAL; R2; 1	LAK; R3; 1	SAN; R4; 2	WAN; R5; 2	SUR; R6; 1	AIR; R7; 2	ORA; R8; Ret																							1st	79
1981	Holden Dealer Team	Holden VC Commodore	SYM; R1; 2	CAL; R2; 1	LAK; R3; 2	SAN; R4; Ret	WAN; R5; 1	AIR; R6; 1	SUR; R7; 2	ORA; R8; 2																							2nd	75
1982	Holden Dealer Team	Holden VC Commodore Holden VH Commodore SS	SAN; R1; 2	CAL; R2; DSQ	SYM; R3; 1	ORA; R4; DSQ	LAK; R5; DSQ	WAN; R6; DSQ	AIR; R7; DSQ	SUR; R8; DSQ																							5th	22
1983	Holden Dealer Team	Holden VH Commodore SS	CAL; R1; Ret	SAN; R2; 2	SYM; R3; Ret	WAN; R3; 9	AIR; R5; 1	SUR; R6; 2	ORA; R7; 2	LAK; R8; 1																							3rd	128
1984	Holden Dealer Team	Holden VH Commodore SS	SAN; R1; 1	SYM; R2; 1	WAN; R3; 2	SUR; R4	ORA; R5; Ret	LAK; R6	AIR; R7; 2																								2nd	96
1985	Holden Dealer Team	Holden VK Commodore SS	WIN; R1	SAN; R2; 1	SYM; R3; 4	WAN; R4; 2	AIR; R5; 2	CAL; R6; Ret	SUR; R7; 3	LAK; R8; 3	AMA; R9; 5	ORA; R10; 8																					3rd	153
1986	Holden Dealer Team	Holden VK Commodore SS Group A	AMA; R1; 5	SYM; R2; Ret	SAN; R3	AIR; R4; DSQ	WAN; R5; 12	SUR; R6; 1	CAL; R7; 5	LAK; R8; 3	WIN; R9; 6	ORA; R10; 2																					4th	117
1987	HDT Racing Pty Ltd	Holden VK Commodore SS Group A	CAL; R1; Ret	SYM; R2; 3	LAK; R3; 5	WAN; R4; 7	AIR; R5; 4	SUR; R6; 9	SAN; R7; 9	AMA; R8; 7	ORA; R9; 7																						7th	65
1988	Mobil 1 Racing	BMW E30 M3	CAL; R1; DSQ	SYM; R2; 5	WIN; R3; 7	WAN; R4; 4	AIR; R5; 6	LAK; R6; 5	SAN; R7; 13	AMA; R8; 5	ORA; R9; 8																						6th	47
1989	Mobil 1 Racing	Ford Sierra RS500	AMA; R1; Ret	SYM; R2; 2	LAK; R3; 4	WAN; R4; 4	MAL; R5; Ret	SAN; R6; 2	WIN; R7; 2	ORA; R8; 1																							3rd	80
1990	Mobil 1 Racing	Ford Sierra RS500	AMA; R1; 5	SYM; R2; 2	LAK; R3; 19	WAN; R4; 9	MAL; R5; 2	SAN; R6; 4	WIN; R7; 1	ORA; R8; 2																							2nd	85
1991	Perkins Engineering	Holden VN Commodore SS Group A SV	SAN; R1; 7	SYM; R2; 7	WAN; R3; 9	LAK; R4; 6	WIN; R5; 9	AMA; R6; 6	MAL; R7; 6	LAK; R8; 6	ORA; R9; 7																						6th	38
1992	Advantage Racing	Holden VN Commodore SS Group A SV	AMA; R1; 1	AMA; R2; 6	SAN; R3; 10	SAN; R4; 5	SYM; R5; 9	SYM; R6; 11	WIN; R7; 10	WIN; R8; 18	LAK; R9; 10	LAK; R10; 9	EAS; R11; 6	EAS; R12; 8	MAL; R13	MAL; R14	WAN; R15	WAN; R16	ORA; R17; 10	ORA; R18; 11													11th	100
1993	Advantage Racing	Holden VP Commodore	AMA; R1; 9	AMA; R2; Ret	SYM; R3; 5	SYM; R4; 8	PHI; R5; 6	PHI; R6; 8	LAK; R7; 3	LAK; R8; 6	WIN; R9; 6	WIN; R10; 3	EAS; R11; 7	EAS; R12; 8	MAL; R13; 7	MAL; R14; 6	WAN; R15; 7	WAN; R15; 5	ORA; R18; 1	ORA; R18; 5													8th	82
1994	Holden Racing Team	Holden VP Commodore	AMA; R1; 5	AMA; R2; 3	SAN; R3; 5	SAN; R4; 4	SYM; R5; 4	SYM; R6; 3	PHI; R7; 4	**PHI**; **R8**; **2**	LAK; R9; Ret	LAK; R10; 3	WIN; R11; 7	WIN; R12; 10	EAS; R13; 1	EAS; R14; 1	MAL; R15; 3	MAL; R15; 7	BAR; R18; 8	BAR; R18; 10	ORA; R19; 3	ORA; R20; 2											3rd	222
1995	Holden Racing Team	Holden VR Commodore	SAN; R1; 3	SAN; R2; 8	SYM; R3; 4	SYM; R4; 1	BAT; R5; 8	BAT; R6; 6	PHI; R7; 1	PHI; R8; 3	LAK; R9; 3	LAK; R10; 2	WIN; R11; 3	WIN; R12; 2	EAS; R13; 3	EAS; R14; 3	MAL; R15; 2	MAL; R16; 2	BAR; R17; 2	BAR; R18; 3	ORA; R19; 5	ORA; R20; 3											3rd	285
1996	Holden Racing Team	Holden VR Commodore	EAS; R1; 5	EAS; R2; Ret	EAS; R3; DNS	SAN; R4; 3	SAN; R5; 9	SAN; R6; 5	BAT; R7; 2	BAT; R8; 7	BAT; R9; 4	SYM; R10; 2	SYM; R11; 2	SYM; R12; 2	PHI; R13; 4	PHI; R14; Ret	PHI; R15; Ret	CAL; R16; 12	CAL; R17; Ret	CAL; R18; 5	LAK; R19; 2	LAK; R20; 2	LAK; R21; Ret	BAR; R22; 2	BAR; R23; 2	BAR; R24; Ret	MAL; R25; 6	MAL; R26; 3	MAL; R27; Ret	ORA; R28; 1	ORA; R29; 1	ORA; R30; 1	4th	286
1997	Holden Racing Team	Holden VS Commodore	CAL; R1; 6	CAL; R2; 8	CAL; R3; 10	PHI; R4; Ret	PHI; R5; 9	PHI; R6; 5	SAN; R7; 5	SAN; R8; 17	SAN; R9; 11	SYM; R10; 11	SYM; R11; 1	SYM; R12; 2	WIN; R13; 3	WIN; R14; 3	WIN; R15; 9	EAS; R16; 5	EAS; R17; 6	EAS; R18; 5	LAK; R19; 4	LAK; R20; 8	LAK; R21; 4	BAR; R22; 3	BAR; R23; 2	BAR; R24; 3	MAL; R25; 11	MAL; R26; 8	MAL; R27; 14	ORA; 28; 1	ORA; R29; 2	ORA; R30; 12	6th	520
2002	Rod Nash Racing	Holden VX Commodore	ADE; R1	ADE; R2	PHI; R3	PHI; R4	EAS; R5	EAS; R6	EAS; R7	HDV; R8	HDV; R9	HDV; R10	CAN; R11	CAN; R12	CAN; R13	BAR; R14	BAR; R15	BAR; R16	ORA; R17	ORA; R18	WIN; R19	WIN; R20	QLD; R21	BAT; R22; 23	SUR; R23	SUR; R24	PUK; R25	PUK; R26	PUK; R27	SAN; R28	SAN; R29		69th	20
2004	Holden Racing Team	Holden VY Commodore	ADE; R1	ADE; R2	EAS; R3	PUK; R4	PUK; R5	PUK; R6	HDV; R7	HDV; R8	HDV; R9	BAR; R10	BAR; R11	BAR; R12	QLD; R13	WIN; R14	ORA; R15	ORA; R16	SAN; R17; 14	BAT; R18; Ret	SUR; R19	SUR; R20	SYM; R21	SYM; R22	SYM; R23	EAS; R24	EAS; R25	EAS; R26					58th	140

=== Complete World Endurance Championship results ===
(key) (Races in bold indicate pole position) (Races in italics indicate fastest lap)

Year	Team	Car	1	2	3	4	5	6	7	8	9	10	11	12	13	14	15	DC	Points
1981	Porsche Cars Australia	Porsche 924 Carrera GTR	DAY	SEB	MUG	MNZ	RIV	SIL	NUR	LMS; DNS	PUR	DAY	WAT	SPA	MOS	RAM	BRA	NC	0
1984	Team Australia (United Kingdom) John Fitzpatrick Racing	Porsche 956B	MNZ	SIL; 21	LMS; Ret	NUR	BRA	MOS	SPA	IMO	FJI	KYA	SAN					NC	0

=== Complete FIA European Touring Car Championship results ===
(key) (Races in bold indicate pole position) (Races in italics indicate fastest lap)

Year	Team	Car	1	2	3	4	5	6	7	8	9	10	11	12	13	14	DC	Points
1986	(Australia) Holden Dealer Team	Holden VK Commodore SS Group A	MNZ; Ret	DON; 5	HOC; 5	MIS	AND	BRN	ZEL	NUR	SPA; 22	SIL	NAG	ZOL	JAR	EST	NA	44

=== Complete World Touring Car Championship results ===
(key) (Races in bold indicate pole position) (Races in italics indicate fastest lap)

Year	Team	Car	1	2	3	4	5	6	7	8	9	10	11	DC	Points
1987	(Australia) HDT Racing P/L	Holden VL Commodore SS Group A	MNZ	JAR	DIJ	NUR	SPA; Ret	BNO	SIL	BAT ovr:1 cls:1	CAL ovr:8 cls:4	WEL ovr:5 cls:4	FJI	NC	0

† Not eligible for series points

=== Complete Asia-Pacific Touring Car Championship results ===
(key) (Races in bold indicate pole position) (Races in italics indicate fastest lap)

Year	Team	Car	1	2	3	4	DC	Points
1988	(Australia) Mobil 1 Racing	BMW M3	BAT; Ret	WEL; Ret	PUK; 4	FJI	8th	25

=== Complete Bathurst 500/1000 results ===
Peter Brock won the Bathurst 500/1000 a record 9 times including winning the 1979 Bathurst 1000 by a record margin of 6 laps (still the race record as of 2017).

Year	Team	Co-drivers	Car	Class	Laps	Pos.	Class pos.
1969	(Australia) Holden Dealer Team	(Australia) Des West	Holden HT Monaro GTS350	D	130	3rd	3rd
1970	(Australia) Holden Dealer Team	(Australia) Bob Morris	Holden LC Torana GTR XU-1	C	107	37th	14th
1971	(Australia) Holden Dealer Team		Holden LC Torana GTR XU-1	D	129	8th	3rd
1972	(Australia) Holden Dealer Team		Holden LJ Torana GTR XU-1	C	130	1st	1st
1973	(Australia) Holden Dealer Team	(Australia) Doug Chivas	Holden LJ Torana GTR XU-1	D	163	2nd	2nd
1974	(Australia) Holden Dealer Team	(Australia) Brian Sampson	Holden LH Torana SL/R 5000	3001 – 6000cc	118	DNF	DNF
1975	(Australia) Gown - Hindhaugh	(Australia) Brian Sampson	Holden LH Torana SL/R 5000 L34	D	163	1st	1st
1976	(Australia) Team Brock	(Australia) Phil Brock	Holden LH Torana SL/R 5000 L34	3001cc - 6000cc	160	3rd	3rd
1977	(Australia) Bill Patterson Racing	(Australia) Phil Brock	Holden LX Torana SS A9X Hatchback	3001cc - 6000cc	162	4th	4th
1978	(Australia) Holden Dealer Team	(New Zealand) Jim Richards	Holden LX Torana SS A9X Hatchback	A	163	1st	1st
1979	(Australia) Holden Dealer Team	(New Zealand) Jim Richards	Holden LX Torana SS A9X Hatchback	A	163	1st	1st
1980	(Australia) Holden Dealer Team	(New Zealand) Jim Richards	Holden VC Commodore	3001-6000cc	163	1st	1st
1981	(Australia) Holden Dealer Team	(New Zealand) Jim Richards	Holden VC Commodore	8 Cylinder & Over	103	21st	12th
1982	(Australia) Holden Dealer Team	(Australia) Larry Perkins	Holden VH Commodore SS	A	163	1st	1st
1983	(Australia) Holden Dealer Team	(Australia) John Harvey (Australia) Larry Perkins (Australia) Phil Brock	Holden VH Commodore SS	A	163	1st	1st
1983	(Australia) Holden Dealer Team	(Australia) Larry Perkins	Holden VH Commodore SS	A	8	DNF	DNF
1984	(Australia) Holden Dealer Team	(Australia) Larry Perkins	Holden VK Commodore	Group C	163	1st	1st
1985	(Australia) Holden Dealer Team	(New Zealand) David Oxton	Holden VK Commodore	C	160	DNF	DNF
1986	(Australia) Holden Dealer Team	(Canada) Allan Moffat	Holden VK Commodore SS Group A	C	162	5th	4th
1987	(Australia) Holden Dealer Team	(Australia) Peter McLeod (Australia) David Parsons (Australia) Jon Crooke	Holden VL Commodore SS Group A	1	158	1st	1st
1987	(Australia) Holden Dealer Team	(Australia) David Parsons	Holden VL Commodore SS Group A	1	32	DNF	DNF
1988	(Australia) Mobil 1 Racing	(Australia) Neil Crompton (New Zealand) Jim Richards	BMW M3	B	89	DNF	DNF
1989	(Australia) Mobil 1 Racing	(United Kingdom) Andy Rouse	Ford Sierra RS500	A	81	DNF	DNF
1990	(Australia) Mobil 1 Racing	(United Kingdom) Andy Rouse	Ford Sierra RS500	1	160	4th	4th
1991	(Australia) Mobil 1 Racing	(Australia) Andrew Miedecke	Holden VN Commodore SS Group A SV	1	147	7th	6th
1992	(Australia) Mobil 1 Racing	(Germany) Manuel Reuter	Holden VP Commodore	C	118	27th	3rd
1993	(Australia) Mobil 1 Racing	(United Kingdom) John Cleland	Holden VP Commodore	A	142	17th	17th
1994	(Australia) Holden Racing Team	(Australia) Tomas Mezera	Holden VP Commodore	A	138	DNF	DNF
1995	(Australia) Holden Racing Team	(Australia) Tomas Mezera	Holden VR Commodore		32	DNF	DNF
1996	(Australia) Holden Racing Team	(Australia) Tomas Mezera	Holden VR Commodore		160	5th	5th
1997*	(United Kingdom) Vauxhall Sport	(United Kingdom) Derek Warwick	Vauxhall Vectra		148	6th	6th
1997	(Australia) Holden Racing Team	(Australia) Mark Skaife	Holden VS Commodore	L1	52	DNF	DNF
2002	(Australia) Team Brock	(New Zealand) Craig Baird	Holden VX Commodore		136	23rd	23rd
2004	(Australia) Holden Racing Team	(United Kingdom) Jason Plato	Holden VY Commodore		27	DNS	DNS

* Super Touring race

=== Complete Sandown endurance results ===
As he did at Bathurst, Brock won the Sandown Endurance race a record nine times during his career, including seven wins in a row from 1975 to 1981. He also finished on the podium in 1990 (2nd) and 1996 (3rd).

Year	Team	Co-drivers	Car	Class	Laps	Pos.	Class pos.
1970	(Australia) Holden Dealer Team		Holden LC Torana GTR XU-1	C	125	4th	2nd
1971	(Australia) Holden Dealer Team		Holden LC Torana GTR XU-1	C	122	6th	4th
1972	(Australia) Holden Dealer Team		Holden LJ Torana GTR XU-1	C	100	DNF	DNF
1973	(Australia) Holden Dealer Team		Holden LJ Torana GTR XU-1	D	130	1st	1st
1974	(Australia) Holden Dealer Team		Holden LH Torana SL/R 5000	D	120	10th	3rd
1975	(Australia) Gown - Hindhaugh		Holden LH Torana SL/R 5000 L34	A	130	1st	1st
1976	(Australia) Team Brock		Holden LH Torana SL/R 5000 L34	D	130	1st	1st
1977	(Australia) Bill Patterson Racing		Holden LX Torana SS A9X Hatchback	A	129	1st	1st
1978	(Australia) Holden Dealer Team		Holden LX Torana SS A9X Hatchback	6000cc	129	1st	1st
1979	(Australia) Holden Dealer Team		Holden LX Torana SS A9X Hatchback	A	129	1st	1st
1980	(Australia) Holden Dealer Team		Holden VC Commodore	A	109	1st	1st
1981	(Australia) Holden Dealer Team		Holden VC Commodore	A	119	1st	1st
1982	(Australia) Holden Dealer Team		Holden VH Commodore SS	D	NA	DNF	DNF
1983	(Australia) Holden Dealer Team	(Australia) John Harvey	Holden VH Commodore SS	Over 3000cc	127	DSQ	DSQ
1983	(Australia) Holden Dealer Team		Holden VH Commodore SS	Over 3000cc	22	DNF	DNF
1984	(Australia) Holden Dealer Team	(Australia) Larry Perkins	Holden VK Commodore	Over 3000cc	129	1st	1st
1985	(Australia) Holden Dealer Team	(New Zealand) David Oxton	Holden VK Commodore	A	41	DNF	DNF
1986	(Australia) Holden Dealer Team	(Canada) Allan Moffat	Holden VK Commodore SS Group A	B	128	4th	4th
1987	(Australia) HDT Racing P/L	(Australia) David Parsons	Holden VL Commodore SS Group A	A	113	DNF	DNF
1988	(Australia) Mobil 1 Racing	(New Zealand) Jim Richards (Australia) Neil Crompton	BMW M3	B	122	7th	1st
1988	(Australia) Mobil 1 Racing	(Australia) Neil Crompton (Australia) David Parsons	BMW M3	B	58	DNF	DNF
1989	(Australia) Mobil 1 Racing	(Australia) Brad Jones (Australia) Mark Larkham	Ford Sierra RS500	A	155	7th	7th
1989	(Australia) Mobil 1 Racing	(New Zealand) Paul Radisich	Ford Sierra RS500	A	61	DNF	DNF
1990	(Australia) Mobil 1 Racing	(Australia) Charlie O'Brien	Ford Sierra RS500	Div.1	161	2nd	2nd
1990	(Australia) Mobil 1 Racing	(Australia) Andrew Miedecke (Australia) David Parsons	Ford Sierra RS500	Div.1	151	4th	4th
1991	(Australia) Mobil 1 Racing	(Australia) Andrew Miedecke (Australia) Tomas Mezera	Holden VN Commodore SS Group A SV	A	133	DNF	DNF
1991	(Australia) Mobil 1 Racing	(Australia) Larry Perkins (Australia) Tomas Mezera	Holden VN Commodore SS Group A SV	A	103	DNF	DNF
1992	(Australia) Mobil 1 Racing	(Australia) Troy Dunstan	Holden VN Commodore SS Group A SV	3A	110	10th	5th
1993	(Australia) Mobil 1 Racing	(Australia) Charlie O'Brien	Holden VP Commodore	V8	133	DNF	DNF
1994	(Australia) Holden Racing Team	(Australia) Tomas Mezera	Holden VP Commodore	V8	161	6th	6th
1995	(Australia) Holden Racing Team	(Australia) Tomas Mezera	Holden VR Commodore		67	DNF	DNF
1996	(Australia) Holden Racing Team	(Australia) Tomas Mezera	Holden VR Commodore		161	3rd	3rd
1997	(Australia) Holden Racing Team	(Australia) Mark Skaife	Holden VS Commodore		150	12th	12th
2004	(Australia) Holden Racing Team	(United Kingdom) Jason Plato	Holden VY Commodore		156	14th	14th

=== Complete 24 Hours of Le Mans results ===
Year	Team	Co-drivers	Car	Class	Laps	Pos.	Class pos.
1976	(Australia) Team Brock	(Australia) Brian Muir (France) Jean-Claude Aubriet	BMW 3.5CSL	Gr.5	156	DNF	DNF
1981	Porsche Cars Australia	(Australia) Colin Bond (New Zealand) Jim Richards	Porsche 924 Carrera GTR	GT	0	DNS	DNS
1984	Team Australia (United Kingdom) John Fitzpatrick Racing	(Australia) Larry Perkins	Porsche 956B	C1	145	DNF	DNF

=== Complete Spa 24 Hours results ===
Year	Team	Co-drivers	Car	Class	Laps	Pos.	Class pos.
1977	(United Kingdom) Dealer Team Vauxhall	(United Kingdom) Gerry Marshall	Vauxhall Firenza Magnum 2300	-2500	276	2nd	1st
1986	(Australia) Holden Dealer Team	(Canada) Allan Moffat (Australia) John Harvey	Holden VK Commodore SS Group A	Div. 3	412	22nd	11th
1987	(Australia) Holden Dealer Team	(Australia) David Parsons (New Zealand) Neville Crichton	Holden VL Commodore SS Group A	Div. 3	206	DNF	DNF

=== Complete Bathurst/Eastern Creek 12 Hour results ===
Year	Team	Co-drivers	Car	Class	Laps	Pos.	Class pos.
1991	(Australia) Suttons Holden	(Australia) Neil Crompton (Australia) Peter McKay	Holden VN Commodore S	C	235	4th	1st
1992	Peugeot Concessionaires Australia	(Australia) Neil Crompton (Australia) Paul Gover	Peugeot 405 Mi16	B	235	14th	2nd
1993	(Australia) Castle Hill Racing	(Australia) Tony Scott	Holden VP Commodore SS	D	242	8th	1st
1994	Volvo Cars Australia	(Australia) Tony Scott	Volvo 850 T-5R	T	225	25th	5th
1995	Volvo Cars Australia	(Australia) Tony Scott	Volvo 850 T-5R	T	344	16th	3rd

=== Complete Bathurst 24 Hour results ===
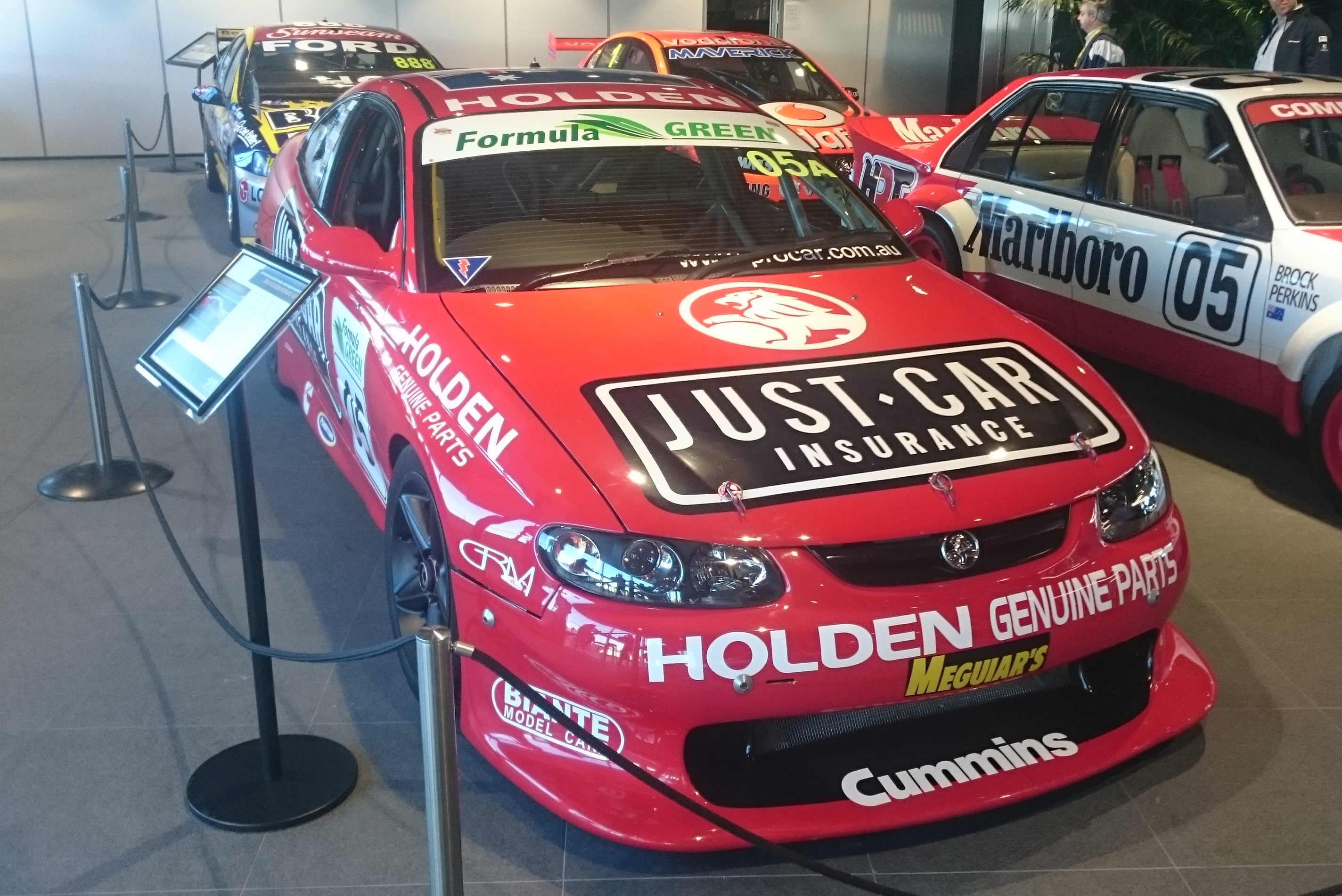
The 2003 Bathurst 24 Hour winning Holden Monaro

Year	Team	Co-drivers	Car	Class	Laps	Pos.	Class pos.
2003	(Australia) Garry Rogers Motorsport	(New Zealand) Greg Murphy (Australia) Jason Bright (Australia) Todd Kelly	Holden Monaro 427C	A	527	1st	1st

=== Endurance wins ===
Peter Brock's other touring car endurance race wins (not including Bathurst or Sandown) include:

- 1973 – Chesterfield 300 at Surfers Paradise and Phillip Island 500K at Phillip Island
- 1975 – Phillip Island 500K at Phillip Island
- 1976 – Rothmans 300 at Surfers Paradise
- 1978 – ABE Copiers 250 at Oran Park, Rothmans 300 at Surfers Paradise and McEwan Spanners Twin 250 at Calder Park
- 1980 – CRC 300 at Amaroo Park and Adelaide 250 at Adelaide International Raceway
- 1981 – CRC 300 at Amaroo Park and Adelaide 250 at Adelaide International Raceway
- 1983 – Humes Guardrail 300 at Adelaide International Raceway
- 1984 – Motorcraft 300 at Surfers Paradise
- 1986 – Wellington 500 at Wellington Street Circuit (New Zealand)
- 1987 – Wellington 500 at Wellington Street Circuit (New Zealand)
- 1988 – Pepsi 250 at Oran Park
- 1990 – Pukekohe 500 at Pukekohe Park Raceway (New Zealand)

== See also ==
- List of Australian Touring Car and V8 Supercar Champions
- List of vegans
- Order of Australia

== Bibliography ==
- West, Luke (20 August 2021). The Immortals of Australian Motor Racing: The Local Heroes (Part of the 7-volume comprehensive sports collection). Immortals of Australian Sport (7-book series). Gelding Street Press. ISBN 978-1-925946-98-7.

Sporting positions
Preceded by Allan Moffat	Winner of the Bathurst 500; 1972	Succeeded by Allan Moffat; Ian Geoghegan
Preceded by John Goss	Winner of the Sandown 250; 1973	Succeeded by Allan Moffat
Preceded by Allan Moffat	Winner of the Australian Touring Car Championship; 1974	Succeeded by Colin Bond
Preceded by Allan Moffat	Winner of the Sandown 250 / 400; 1975, 1976, 1977, 1978, 1979, 1980, 1981	Succeeded by Allan Moffat
Preceded by John Goss; Kevin Bartlett	Winner of the Bathurst 1000; 1975 (with Brian Sampson)	Succeeded by Bob Morris; John Fitzpatrick
Preceded by Allan Moffat	Winner of the Australian Touring Car Championship; 1978	Succeeded by Bob Morris
Preceded by Allan Moffat; Jacky Ickx	Winner of the Bathurst 1000; 1978, 1979 & 1980 (with Jim Richards)	Succeeded by Dick Johnson; John French
Preceded by Bob Morris	Winner of the Australian Touring Car Championship; 1980	Succeeded by Dick Johnson
Preceded by Dick Johnson; John French	Winner of the Bathurst 1000; 1982, 1983 & 1984 (with Larry Perkins and John Harvey [1983 only])	Succeeded by John Goss; Armin Hahne
Preceded by Allan Moffat	Winner of the Sandown 500; 1984 (with Larry Perkins)	Succeeded by Jim Richards; Tony Longhurst
Preceded by Allan Grice; Graeme Bailey	Winner of the Bathurst 1000; 1987 (with David Parsons & Peter McLeod)	Succeeded by Tony Longhurst; Tomas Mezera
Records
Preceded by Allan Moffat; 25 wins (1964 – 1988)	Most ATCC round wins 26 (1973 – 2004), 26th win at Round 3 of the 1982 Australian Touring Car Championship	Succeeded by Allan Moffat; 32 wins (1964 – 1988)
Preceded by Allan Moffat; 32 wins (1964 – 1988)	Most ATCC round wins 37 (1973 – 2004), 33rd win at Round 8 of the 1989 Australian Touring Car Championship	Succeeded by Mark Skaife; 42 wins (1987 – 2011)
