= Phillip Island 500 =

(Victoria (state)) Phillip Island 500
- Race Information
Venue	Phillip Island Grand Prix Circuit
Number of times held	13
First held	1971
Last held	2018
- Race Format
- Race 1
Laps	57
Distance	250 km
- Race 2
Laps	57
Distance	250 km
- Last Event (2018)
- Overall Winner
(New Zealand) Scott McLaughlin	DJR Team Penske
- Race Winners
(New Zealand) Scott McLaughlin	DJR Team Penske
(New Zealand) Scott McLaughlin	DJR Team Penske

The Phillip Island 500 was an annual motor racing event, last held for Supercars at the Phillip Island Grand Prix Circuit in Phillip Island, Victoria. The race had three distinct eras; from 1971 to 1977 as an endurance production and later Australian Touring Car Championship race, from 2008 to 2011 as an endurance race as part of V8 Supercars and from 2017 to 2018 as a Supercars Championship event consisting of two 250 km races.

== History ==
=== Background ===
From 1960 to 1962, Phillip Island hosted the Armstrong 500, a 500-mile race which later evolved into the Bathurst 1000.

=== 1971–77 ===
The 1971 and 1972 races were open to Group E Series Production Touring Cars. With the demise of the Group E category at the end of 1972 the event switched to Group C Touring Car regulations. The 500K was a round of the Australian Manufacturers' Championship from 1971 to 1975 and counted towards both the Australian Championship of Makes and the Australian Touring Car Championship in 1976 and 1977. The event name changed throughout this period according to the sponsorship (or lack thereof) each year.

Colin Bond and Peter Brock dominated the event in the 1970s, winning five of the seven events between them. In 1972, Allan Moffat won the event, in what is to this day the only Phillip Island 500 win for Ford. Moffat crashed his 1973 Hardie-Ferodo 1000 winning Ford XA Falcon GT Hardtop into the lake during the 1973 race. As a result of the crash during which he almost hit his head on the steering wheel, Moffat never again raced wearing an open faced helmet.

=== 2008–11 ===
The race was revived in 2008 as two-driver endurance event for V8 Supercars, replacing the Sandown 500 as the lead-in event to the annual Bathurst 1000 race. The format featured two short races on Saturday, one for each co-driver, that set the grid, before the traditional 500 km race on the Sunday. It remained part of the V8 Supercar Championship Series for four consecutive years before the Sandown 500 was reinstated as the host of the 500 km championship race for the 2012 season.

This iteration of the event was dominated by the Holden Racing Team and Triple Eight Race Engineering, winning two races each. The Triple Eight entry of Craig Lowndes and Jamie Whincup also led the other two events late in the race, before being overtaken by the Holden Racing Team's Garth Tander. The 2008 event saw Tander, driving with Mark Skaife, win after Whincup lost the lead due to an error. In 2009, Tander, this time driving with Will Davison, passed Lowndes, who had a slowly deflating tyre, on the final lap. For the 2010 season, a rules change forced a team's primary drivers to be split across their two cars, therefore Lowndes and Whincup were split up, with vastly different outcomes. Whincup lost a third race from the lead in three years following an engine failure, whilst Lowndes would go on to win, this time with Skaife. This occurred ten years after Lowndes and Skaife had won the Queensland 500 driving together. The final running of the event in 2011 saw Lowndes and Skaife win again, leading home a Triple Eight one-two finish ahead of Whincup and Andrew Thompson. The win saw Skaife level Colin Bond as the only drivers to win the event three times.

=== 2017–18 ===
In 2017, the Phillip Island SuperSprint format was dropped in favour of two 250 km races, which led to the revival of the Phillip Island 500 name. The event itself was marred by a spate of tyre failures across the weekend, while Ford were also able to break their 45 year drought at the event.

The 2018 event was staged over a three-day weekend, from Friday to Sunday. Two thirty-minute practice sessions were held on Friday. Saturday featured a twenty-minute qualifying session which decided the grid positions for the following 250 kilometre race. A twenty-minute qualifying session was held on Sunday which decided the grid for the following 250 km race. The Phillip Island event returned to SuperSprint status in 2019.

== Winners ==
Year	Event	Driver(s)	Team	Car
1971	Phillip Island 500K	(Australia) Colin Bond	Holden Dealer Team	Holden LC Torana GTR XU-1
1972	Phillip Island 500K	(Canada) Allan Moffat	Ford Motor Co. of Aust.	Ford XY Falcon GTHO Phase III
1973	Phillip Island 500K	(Australia) Peter Brock	Holden Dealer Team	Holden LJ Torana GTR XU-1
1974	RE-PO 500K	(Australia) Colin Bond	Holden Dealer Team	Holden LH Torana SL/R 5000 L34
1975	Phillip Island 500K	(Australia) Peter Brock	Gown - Hindhaugh	Holden LH Torana SL/R 5000 L34
1976	Rover 500K	(Australia) Colin Bond	Holden Dealer Team	Holden LH Torana SL/R 5000 L34
1977	Ready Plan Insurance Phillip Island 500K	(Australia) Allan Grice	Craven Mild Racing	Holden LX Torana SS A9X
1978 – 2007	not held			
2008	L&H 500	(Australia) Garth Tander (Australia) Mark Skaife	Holden Racing Team	Holden VE Commodore
2009	L&H 500	(Australia) Garth Tander (Australia) Will Davison	Holden Racing Team	Holden VE Commodore
2010	L&H 500	(Australia) Craig Lowndes (Australia) Mark Skaife	Triple Eight Race Engineering	Holden VE Commodore
2011	L&H 500	(Australia) Craig Lowndes (Australia) Mark Skaife	Triple Eight Race Engineering	Holden VE Commodore
2012 – 2016	not held			
2017	WD-40 Phillip Island 500	(Australia) Mark Winterbottom	Prodrive Racing Australia	Ford FG X Falcon
2018	WD-40 Phillip Island 500	(New Zealand) Scott McLaughlin	DJR Team Penske	Ford FG X Falcon

== Multiple winners ==
=== By driver ===
Event Wins	Driver	Years
3	(Australia) Colin Bond	1971, 1974, 1976
3	(Australia) Mark Skaife	2008, 2010, 2011
2	(Australia) Peter Brock	1973, 1975
2	(Australia) Garth Tander	2008, 2009
2	(Australia) Craig Lowndes	2010, 2011

=== By team ===
Event Wins	Driver
4	Holden Dealer Team
2	Holden Racing Team
2	Triple Eight Race Engineering

=== By manufacturer ===
Event Wins	Manufacturer
10	Holden
3	Ford

== Event sponsors ==
- 1974: RE-PO
- 1976: Rover
- 1977: Ready Plan Insurance
- 2008–11: L&H
- 2017–18: WD-40

== See also ==
- List of Australian Touring Car Championship races
- Phillip Island SuperSprint
