= 2011 L&H 500 =

2011 V8 Supercar championship race

(Victoria (state)) 2011 L&H 500
Event Information
- Round 9 of 14 in the 2011 International V8 Supercars Championship
- Date: 16–18 September 2011
- Location: Phillip Island, Victoria
- Venue: Phillip Island Grand Prix Circuit
- Weather: Fine

Results
Race 1
Distance	113 laps	500 km
Pole position	Will Davison; Luke Youlden; Ford Performance Racing	70 pts
Winner	Craig Lowndes; Mark Skaife; Triple Eight Race Engineering	3:08:13.2041

The 2011 L&H 500 was the ninth event of the 2011 International V8 Supercars Championship. It was held on the weekend of 16 to 18 September at the Phillip Island Grand Prix Circuit in Victoria, Australia. This was the eleventh running of Phillip Island 500, the fourth occasion which filled the annual 500 kilometre, two-driver V8 Supercar race, and the 21st ATCC championship race meeting at the circuit. It was also the last 500 kilometre race for V8 Supercars at Phillip Island, as the endurance race returned to Sandown Raceway in 2012, and the Phillip Island event reverted to a sprint race format with two 150 kilometre races.

Unique to the L&H 500, two preliminary 14 lap qualifying races were held on Saturday with the two drivers of each car starting one race each. A single pitstop by each car in either race, in which at least two tyres were changed, was mandated, with the combined results of the two qualifying races determining the grid for the main 500 kilometre race. The 500 kilometre race itself was Race 19 of the championship.

Tony D'Alberto Racing driver Tony D'Alberto was forced to withdraw from the race after contracting chicken pox. He was replaced by Fujitsu Series driver Taz Douglas.

Ford Performance Racing's Will Davison and Luke Youlden came out best of the qualifying format, and secured pole position for the main race, with the 2010 L&H 500 winners Craig Lowndes and Mark Skaife lining up sixth.

The TeamVodafone pairing of Craig Lowndes and Mark Skaife came through the 500 km race to secure the consecutive victories at the event, followed by Jamie Whincup and Andrew Thompson, with pole-sitters Will Davison and Luke Youlden crossing the line third.

== Results ==
=== L&H 500 ===
Results of the 500 kilometre Race 19 were as follows:

Pos	No	Driver	Car	Team Competitor	Laps	Time/retired	Grid
1	888	(Australia) Craig Lowndes (Australia) Mark Skaife	Holden VE Commodore	Triple Eight Race Engineering	113	3:08:13.2041	6
2	88	(Australia) Jamie Whincup (Australia) Andrew Thompson	Holden VE Commodore	Triple Eight Race Engineering	113	+6.3s	4
3	6	(Australia) Will Davison (Australia) Luke Youlden	Ford FG Falcon	Ford Performance Racing	113	+9.2s	1
4	2	(Australia) Garth Tander (Australia) Nick Percat	Holden VE Commodore	Holden Racing Team	113	+15.6s	2
5	9	(New Zealand) Shane van Gisbergen (New Zealand) John McIntyre	Ford FG Falcon	Stone Brothers Racing	113	+15.6s	3
6	16	(Australia) David Reynolds (Australia) Tim Blanchard	Holden VE Commodore	Kelly Racing	113	+19.5s	7
7	8	(Australia) Jason Bright (Australia) Andrew Jones	Holden VE Commodore	Brad Jones Racing	113	+27.4s	22
8	15	(Australia) Rick Kelly (Australia) Owen Kelly	Holden VE Commodore	Kelly Racing	113	+32.4s	12
9	1	(Australia) James Courtney (Australia) Cameron McConville	Holden VE Commodore	Holden Racing Team	113	+34.6s	10
10	61	(New Zealand) Fabian Coulthard (New Zealand) Craig Baird	Holden VE Commodore	Walkinshaw Racing	113	+41.0s	14
11	14	(Australia) Jason Bargwanna (Australia) Shane Price	Holden VE Commodore	Brad Jones Racing	113	+49.7s	27
12	33	(Australia) Lee Holdsworth (Australia) Greg Ritter	Holden VE Commodore	Garry Rogers Motorsport	113	+52.3s	16
13	11	(New Zealand) Greg Murphy (Denmark) Allan Simonsen	Holden VE Commodore	Kelly Racing	113	+1m 2.6s	8
14	7	(Australia) Todd Kelly (Australia) David Russell	Holden VE Commodore	Kelly Racing	113	+1m 7.4s	11
15	49	(Australia) Steve Owen (Australia) Paul Morris	Holden VE Commodore	Paul Morris Motorsport	113	+1m 7.6s	15
16	34	(Australia) Michael Caruso (Australia) Marcus Marshall	Holden VE Commodore	Garry Rogers Motorsport	113	+1m 14.2s	13
17	5	(Australia) Mark Winterbottom (New Zealand) Steven Richards	Ford FG Falcon	Ford Performance Racing	113	+1m 17.7s	9
18	19	(Australia) Jonathon Webb (United Kingdom) Richard Lyons	Ford FG Falcon	Tekno Autosports	113	+1m 19.7s	24
19	12	(Australia) Dean Fiore (Australia) Michael Patrizi	Ford FG Falcon	Triple F Racing	113	+1m 22.1s	23
20	39	(Australia) Russell Ingall (Australia) Jack Perkins	Holden VE Commodore	Paul Morris Motorsport	113	+1m 24.6s	18
21	3	(Australia) Dale Wood (Australia) Taz Douglas	Ford FG Falcon	Tony D'Alberto Racing	112	+1m 24.8s	19
22	4	(Australia) Alex Davison (Australia) David Brabham	Ford FG Falcon	Stone Brothers Racing	113	+1m 27.7s	28
23	55	(Australia) Paul Dumbrell (Australia) Dean Canto	Ford FG Falcon	Rod Nash Racing	113	+1m 30.3s	5
24	47	(Australia) Tim Slade (New Zealand) Daniel Gaunt	Ford FG Falcon	James Rosenberg Racing	113	+1m 30.5s	21
25	18	(Australia) James Moffat (New Zealand) Matt Halliday	Ford FG Falcon	Dick Johnson Racing	113	+1m 33.3s	20
26	17	(Australia) Steven Johnson (Australia) David Besnard	Ford FG Falcon	Dick Johnson Racing	112	+ 1 lap	26
27	30	(Australia) Warren Luff (Australia) Nathan Pretty	Holden VE Commodore	Lucas Dumbrell Motorsport	111	+ 2 laps	17
28	21	(Australia) Karl Reindler (Australia) David Wall	Holden VE Commodore	Britek Motorsport	100	+ 13 laps	25

== Standings ==
- Championship standings after 19 of 28 races were as follows.

Pos	No	Name	Team	Points
1	88	(Australia) Jamie Whincup	Triple Eight Race Engineering	2145
2	888	(Australia) Craig Lowndes	Triple Eight Race Engineering	2053
3	9	(New Zealand) Shane van Gisbergen	Stone Brothers Racing	1716
4	15	(Australia) Rick Kelly	Kelly Racing	1585
5	2	(Australia) Garth Tander	Holden Racing Team	1548
