= 1976 Australian Touring Car Championship =

Motor racing competition

Seasons
- ← 1975 1977 →

The 1976 Australian Touring Car Championship was a CAMS sanctioned Australian motor racing title for Group C Touring Cars. It was the 17th running of the Australian Touring Car Championship. The championship began at Symmons Plains on 29 February and ended at Phillip Island on 28 November in the longest season in the history of the series. 1976 saw a substantial change to the ATCC calendar which was expanded to eleven rounds, incorporating the end-of-season long distance Australian Championship of Makes races for the first time. These races included Sandown's Hang Ten 400 and the Phillip Island 500, although notably not the Bathurst 1000.

After contesting only selected rounds of the 1975 championship, Allan Moffat won his second Australian Touring Car Championship in 1976. He won the Calder, Oran Park and Adelaide rounds, building up a mid-season points lead that his rivals could not bridge. At the Hang Ten 400 at Sandown in September, Moffat re-launched his team as the Moffat Ford Dealers Team with a new Ford XB Falcon GT, built after Moffat's original car and transporter were destroyed by fire in the Adelaide Hills on the way to the Adelaide round in June. Moffat borrowed the Ford Falcon of John Goss for the Adelaide and Lakeside rounds to stay in the series until a new car was built.

Barry Seton, driving a Ford Capri in the Up to 3000 cc class, was Moffat's main title threat for most of the year, winning his class four times, with a best finish of sixth outright at Sandown. Seton lost second place in the championship to Colin Bond when the Holden Torana driver won the final race of the season at Phillip Island. Bond had previously won at Sandown and Lakeside, but had mechanical failures that Moffat, even in his borrowed machinery, did not.

== Drivers ==
The following drivers competed in the 1976 Australian Touring Car Championship.

Entrant	No	Car	Driver
Holden Dealer Team	1	Holden LH Torana SL/R 5000 L34	Colin Bond
Allan Moffat Racing; Moffat Ford Dealers	2/9	Ford XB Falcon GT Hardtop	Allan Moffat
Bob Skelton	3	Holden LH Torana SL/R 5000 L34	Bob Skelton
John Goss	3	Ford XB Falcon GT Hardtop	John Goss
O'Brien's Transport	4	Holden LH Torana SL/R 5000 L34	Charlie O'Brien
Jim Keogh	4	Ford XB Falcon GT Hardtop	Jim Keogh
Team Brock	5	Holden LH Torana SL/R 5000 L34	Peter Brock
Bruce Hindhaugh	6	Holden LH Torana SL/R 5000 L34	Bruce Hindhaugh
Ron Hodgson Motors	7	Holden LH Torana SL/R 5000 L34	Bob Morris
Jack Brabham	7	Holden LH Torana SL/R 5000 L34	Jack Brabham
Charlie O'Brien	8	Holden LH Torana SL/R 5000 L34	Charlie O'Brien
Jim Richards	10	Ford XB Falcon GT Hardtop	Jim Richards
Bob Forbes	11	Holden LH Torana SL/R 5000 L34	Bob Forbes
Gary Cooke	11	Mazda RX-3	Gary Cooke
Craven Mild Racing	12	Holden LH Torana SL/R 5000 L34	Allan Grice
Bob Holden Motors	13	Ford Escort Mark I RS2000	Bob Holden
B&D Autos, Holden Dealer Team	14	Holden LH Torana SL/R 5000 L34	John Harvey
John English	14	Ford Escort Mark I RS2000	John English
Phil Brock	15	Holden LH Torana SL/R 5000 L34	Phil Brock
Garth Wigston	15	Holden LH Torana SL/R 5000 L34	Garth Wigston
Graeme Blanchard	16	Holden LH Torana SL/R 5000 L34	Graeme Blanchard
Ray Kaleda	17	Holden LH Torana SL/R 5000 L34	Ray Kaleda
Bob Forbes	17	Holden LH Torana SL/R 5000 L34	Bob Forbes
Shell Racing	18	Ford XB Falcon GT Hardtop	Murray Carter
Garth Wigston	19	Holden LH Torana SL/R 5000 L34	Garth Wigston
Christine Gibson	19	Alfa Romeo 2000 GTV	Christine Gibson
Peter Janson	20	Holden LH Torana SL/R 5000 L34	Peter Janson
Gown-Hindhaugh	21	Holden LH Torana SL/R 5000 L34	Frank Gardner
Kevin Kennedy	22	Holden LJ Torana GTR XU-1	Kevin Kennedy
Don Holland	23	Mazda RX-3	Don Holland
Johnnie Walker	24	Holden LH Torana SL/R 5000 L34	Johnnie Walker
John Duggan	24	Mazda RX-3	John Duggan
Graham Parsons	25	Holden LH Torana SL/R 5000 L34	Graham Parsons
Barry Seton	25	Ford Capri V6	Barry Seton
Craven Mild	25	Mazda RX-3	Allan Grice
Warren Cullen	26	Holden LH Torana SL/R 5000 L34	Warren Cullen
Lakis Manticas	27	Mazda RX-3	Lakis Manticas
Lakis Manticas	27	Ford Capri V6	Lakis Manticas
Kelvin Gough	28	Holden LH Torana SL/R 5000 L34	Kelvin Gough
Dick Johnson	28	Holden LJ Torana GTR XU-1	Dick Johnson
Garry Willmington	29	Ford XB Falcon GT Hardtop	Garry Willmington
Graeme Ibbotson	29	Ford Capri V6	Graeme Ibbotson
Russell Skaife	30	Ford Capri V6	Russell Skaife
Graham Parsons	31	Holden LH Torana SL/R 5000 L34	Graham Parsons
Alan Cant	31	Ford Capri V6	Alan Cant
Lawrie Nelson	32	Ford Capri V6	Lawrie Nelson
Paul Older	34	BMW 3.0Si	Paul Older
Jim Murcott	35	Ford Escort Mark I RS2000	Jim Murcott
Ron Dickson	36	Triumph Dolomite Sprint	Ron Dickson
John Pollard	37	Holden LH Torana SL/R 5000 L34	John Pollard
Bob Morris	37	Triumph Dolomite Sprint	Bob Morris
David Seldon	38	Triumph Dolomite Sprint	David Seldon
Phil Arnull	39	Holden LH Torana SL/R 5000 L34	Phil Arnull
Wally Scott	42	Toyota Corolla	Wally Scott
Bernie Stack	44	Volkswagen Passat 1300	Bernie Stack
Lyndon Arnel	45	Ford Escort Mark I RS2000	Lyndon Arnel
Ben Penhall	45	Mazda RX-3	Ben Penhall
Ray Farrar	46	Ford Escort Mark I 1300	Ray Farrar
Jeremy Braithwaite	47	Holden LJ Torana GTR XU-1	Jeremy Braithwaite
Graham Moore	49	Ford Capri V6	Graham Moore
Brian Wheeler	51	Mazda RX-3	Brian Wheeler
Eric Boord	51	Ford Escort Mark I RS2000	Eric Boord
Fred Gibson	51	Alfa Romeo 2000 GTV	Fred Gibson
Allan Nuttall	52	Fiat 124 Sport Coupé	Allan Nuttall
John Wharton	53	Mazda RX-3	John Wharton
Chris Heyer	53	Volkswagen Golf GTI	Chris Heyer
Geoff Newton	54	Ford Capri V6	Geoff Newton
Bernie McClure	58	Holden LH Torana SL/R 5000 L34	Bernie McClure
Frank Porter	59	Alfa Romeo Alfetta GT	Frank Porter
Wayne Negus	61	Holden LH Torana SL/R 5000 L34	Wayne Negus
Max McGinley	61	Honda Civic	Max McGinley
Roger Bonhomme	62	Honda Civic	Roger Bonhomme
Craig Bradtke	63	Mazda RX-3	Craig Bradtke
Wayne Mitchell	63	Holden LH Torana SL/R 5000 L34	Wayne Mitchell
Peter Kuebler	63	Alfa Romeo 2000 GTV	Peter Kuebler
Peter Brown	63	Ford Escort Mark I RS2000	Peter Brown
David Langman	64	Holden LH Torana SL/R 5000 L34	David Langman
Barry Wraith	64	Ford Escort Mark I RS2000	Barry Wraith
Ken Brian	64	Honda Civic	Ken Brian
James Liang-Peach	65	Triumph Dolomite Sprint	James Liang-Peach
David Crowther	66	Alfa Romeo GT1300 Junior	David Crowther
Robin Dudfield	67	Alfa Romeo GT1300 Junior	Robin Dudfield
Barry Sharp	69	Ford XB Falcon GT Hardtop	Barry Sharp
Tony Niovanni	69	Holden Gemini	Tony Niovanni
Fred Sayers	70	Holden LJ Torana GTR XU-1	Fred Sayers
Colin Campbell	70	Ford Escort Mark I RS2000	Colin Campbell
Bill Evans	71	Datsun 1200	Bill Evans
Jeff Harris	74	Morris Clubman GT	Jeff Harris
Jim Stewart	75	Morris Clubman GT	Jim Stewart
Ray Molloy	76	Morris Clubman GT	Ray Molloy
Martin Power	77	Holden LJ Torana GTR XU-1	Martin Power
Garry McGrath	77	Ford Escort Mark I 1600	Garry McGrath
Peter Granger	78	BMW 2002tii	Peter Granger
Hugh Donaldson	78	Morris Clubman GT	Hugh Donaldson
Pat Crea	79	Ford Escort Mark I RS2000	Pat Crea
John Millyard	80	Ford Escort Mark I 1300	John Millyard
Geoff Moran	88	Ford Capri V6	Geoff Moran
Brian Rhodes	89	Holden LH Torana SL/R 5000 L34	Brian Rhodes
Jim Richards	90	Mazda RX-3	Jim Richards
Chris Trengrove	91	Renault 12	Chris Trengrove
Terry Wade	95	Triumph Dolomite Sprint	Terry Wade
Herb Vines	96	Ford Capri V6	Herb Vines
Geoff Wade	96	Ford Escort Mark I 1300	Geoff Wade
Bob Nissen	98	Ford Capri V6	Bob Nissan
Graham Harrison	99	Alfa Romeo 2000 GTV	Graham Harrison
Russell Worthington	100	Mazda RX-3	Russell Worthington
Frank Brewster	110	Honda Civic	Frank Brewster

== Calendar ==
The 1976 Australian Touring Car Championship was contested over eleven rounds.

Rd.	Event title	Circuit	Location / state	Date	Format	Winner	Team	Report
1	Symmons Plains	Symmons Plains	Launceston, Tasmania	29 February		John Harvey	B&D Autos	
2	Calder	Calder	Melbourne, Victoria	17 March		Allan Moffat	Allan Moffat Racing	
3	Oran Park	Oran Park	Sydney, New South Wales	28 March		Allan Moffat	Allan Moffat Racing	
4	Sandown	Sandown	Melbourne, Victoria	11 April		Colin Bond	Holden Dealer Team	
5	Amaroo Park	Amaroo Park	Sydney, New South Wales	18 April		Charlie O'Brien	O'Brien's Transport Shell Sport	
6	Datsun Trophy	Adelaide International Raceway	Adelaide, South Australia	6 June	Two heats	Allan Moffat	John Goss Racing Pty Ltd	
7	The Governor's Trophy	Lakeside	Brisbane, Queensland	27 June		Colin Bond	Holden Dealer Team	
8	Hang Ten 400	Sandown	Melbourne, Victoria	12 September	One race (400 km)	Peter Brock	Team Brock	report
9	Rothmans 250	Adelaide International Raceway	Adelaide, South Australia	24 October	One race (250 km)	Allan Grice	Craven Mild Racing	
10	Rothmans 300	Surfers Paradise International Raceway	Surfers Paradise, Queensland	30 October	One race (300 km)	Peter Brock	Team Brock	
11	Rover 500K	Phillip Island	Phillip Island, Victoria	28 November	One race (500 km)	Colin Bond	Holden Dealer Team	report

== Class system ==
Cars competed in two classes, based on engine capacity:

- Up to 3000 cc
- 3001 to 6000 cc

== Points system ==
Championship points were awarded to drivers on the following basis:

Pos.	1st	2nd	3rd	4th	5th	6th
All Rounds Outright	4	3	2	1		
Rounds 1-7 each class	9	6	4	3	2	1
Round 8-11 each class	12	8	6	4	2	1

Points were only awarded to a driver where the car had completed 75% of race distance and was running at the completion of the final lap.

Only the best two results from the four long distance races could be counted by each driver.

== Championship standings ==
Pos.	Driver	Car	Rd 1	Rd 2	Rd 3	Rd 4	Rd 5	Rd 6	Rd 7	Rd 8	Rd 9	Rd 10	Rd 11	Pts.
1	Allan Moffat	Ford XB Falcon GT	6th(1)	1st(13)	1st(13)	Ret	2nd(9)	1st(13)	2nd(9)	2nd(11)	4th((5))	2nd(11)		80
2	Colin Bond	Holden LH Torana SL/R 5000 L34	2nd(9)	2nd(9)	4th(4)	1st(13)	Ret	3rd(6)	1st(13)	Ret	5th(2)	Ret	1st(16)	72
3	Barry Seton	Ford Capri V6		9th(9)	(4)	8th(9)	(4)	8th(9)	7th(9)	6th(12)	9th((6))	7th(8)		64
4	Allan Grice	Holden LH Torana SL/R 5000 L34; Mazda RX-3	13th	3rd(6)	2nd(9)	5th(2)		2nd(9)		Ret	1st(16)		5th(12)	54
5	Peter Brock	Holden LH Torana SL/R 5000 L34		4th(4)		2nd(9)				1st(16)		1st(16)	Ret	45
6	Charlie O'Brien	Holden LH Torana SL/R 5000 L34	11th	6th(1)	5th(2)		1st(13)	5th(2)	3rd(6)	4th((5))	3rd(8)	5th((2))	2nd(11)	43
7	Murray Carter	Ford XB Falcon GT	14th		3rd(6)		5th(2)	4th(4)	5th(2)	5th((2))	2nd(11)	3rd(8)	Ret	35
8	Don Holland	Mazda RX-3	9th(6)	(4)	(3)		(9)	(2)	10th(4)	(2)				31
9	Bob Morris	Holden LH Torana SL/R 5000 L34; Triumph Dolomite Sprint	3rd(6)			Ret				Ret	7th(12)	6th(12)	Ret	30
10	Lyndon Arnel	Ford Escort RS2000	8th(9)	Ret	(9)		(6)	(4)						28
11	John Harvey	Holden LH Torana SL/R 5000 L34	1st(13)			4th(4)	3rd(6)						Ret	23
12	Lawrie Nelson	Ford Capri V6		Ret		10th(6)		(6)		8th(6)			Ret	18
13	Paul Older	BMW 3.0Si	10th(4)			(3)	(1)	(3)	9th(6)					17
14	Peter Janson	Holden LH Torana SL/R 5000 L34	5th(2)		10th			10th					3rd(8)	10
14	Alan Cant	Ford Capri V6			(6)	(4)								10
16	Graeme Blanchard	Holden LH Torana SL/R 5000 L34				6th(1)				3rd(8)				9
16	Garth Wigston	Holden LH Torana SL/R 5000 L34	4th(4)		7th	Ret				Ret			4th(5)	9
16	Russell Skaife	Ford Capri V6		10th(6)			(3)							9
16	Bob Holden	Ford Escort RS2000	12th(3)	Ret	(2)	(1)	(2)	(1)						9
20	Lakis Manticas	Ford Capri V6								7th(8)				8
20	Paul Gulson	Triumph Dolomite Sprint									8th(8)		Ret	8
20	Frank Porter	Alfa Romeo Alfetta GT											9th(8)	8
20	Graham Moore	Ford Capri V6								9th(4)		9th(4)		8
24	Frank Gardner	Holden LH Torana SL/R 5000 L34				3rd(6)								6
24	Barry Wheeler	Mazda RX-3										8th(6)		6
24	Bob Nissen	Ford Capri V6											10th(6)	6
27	Jack Brabham	Holden LH Torana SL/R 5000 L34										4th(5)		5
28	Dick Johnson	Holden LJ Torana GTR XU-1							4th(4)					4
28	Bob Forbes	Holden LH Torana SL/R 5000 L34			6th(1)		4th(3)							4
28	Pat Crea	Ford Escort RS2000									10th(4)			4
28	Geoff Newton	Ford Capri V6											(4)	4
32	John Wharton	Mazda RX-3							(3)					3
32	Bruce Hindhaugh	Holden LH Torana SL/R 5000 L34		5th(2)				6th(1)						3
34	John Stoopman	Holden LJ Torana GTR XU-1											6th(2)	2
34	Martin Power	Holden LJ Torana GTR XU-1											6th(2)	2
34	Craig Bradtke	Mazda RX-3				(2)								2
34	Barry Wraith	Ford Escort RS2000							(2)					2
34	David Seldon	Triumph Dolomite Sprint									(2)			2
34	Peter Granger	BMW 2002										(2)		2
34	Roger Bonhomme	Honda Civic											(2)	2
40	Ray Kaleda	Holden LH Torana SL/R 5000 L34			9th		6th(1)							1
40	Phil Brock	Holden LH Torana SL/R 5000 L34							6th(1)					1
40	Wayne Negus	Holden LH Torana SL/R 5000 L34								10th(1)				1
40	Warren Cullen	Holden LH Torana SL/R 5000 L34								Ret	6th(1)			1
40	Kevin Kennedy	Holden LJ Torana GTR XU-1										10th(1)		1
40	John Pollard	Holden LH Torana SL/R 5000 L34											7th(1)	1
40	Jeremy Braithwaite	Ford Escort RS2000			(1)									1
40	Russell Worthington	Mazda RX-3							(1)					1
40	Ron Dickson	Triumph Dolomite Sprint								(1)				1
40	Graeme Ibbotson	Ford Capri V6									(1)			1
40	John Duggan	Mazda RX-3										(1)		1
40	Chris Heyer	Volkswagen Golf										(1)		1
Pos.	Driver	Car	Rd 1	Rd 2	Rd 3	Rd 4	Rd 5	Rd 6	Rd 7	Rd 8	Rd 9	Rd 10	Rd 11	Pts.

Colour	Result
Gold	Winner
Silver	Second place
Bronze	Third place
Green	Points classification
Blue	Non-points classification
Blue	Non-classified finish (NC)
Purple	Retired, not classified (Ret)
Red	Did not qualify (DNQ)
Red	Did not pre-qualify (DNPQ)
Black	Disqualified (DSQ)
White	Did not start (DNS)
White	Withdrew (WD)
White	Race cancelled (C)
Blank	Did not practice (DNP)
Blank	Did not arrive (DNA)
Blank	Excluded (EX)

Up to 3000 cc class competitors

Points scored in the long distance races which were not retained for championship totals are shown in the above table within double brackets.

== Australian Championship of Makes ==
The 1976 Australian Championship of Makes was contested over a four-round series, staged concurrently with the final four rounds of the Australian Touring Car Championship. It was the sixth championship for manufacturers to be awarded by CAMS, and the first to be contested under the Australian Championship of Makes name. The title was won by Holden.

=== Class system ===
Cars competed in four classes based on engine capacity.

- Up to 1300 cc
- 1301 to 2000 cc
- 2001 to 3000 cc
- 3001 to 6000 cc

=== Points system ===
Championship points were awarded in each class on a 9, 6, 4, 3, 2, 1 basis, with the results of all four races counting towards the championship.
