= 1973 Phillip Island 500K =

The 1973 Phillip Island 500K was an endurance race for Group C Touring Cars, staged at the Phillip Island circuit in Victoria, Australia on 25 November 1973. Race distance was 106 laps of the 4.73 km circuit, a total distance of 501.38 km. The race, which was the fifth and final round of the 1973 Australian Manufacturers' Championship, was the third Phillip Island 500.

The race was won by Peter Brock, driving a Holden LJ Torana GTR XU-1 for the Holden Dealer Team.

Defending race winner Allan Moffat crashed his Bathurst winning Ford XA Falcon GT Hardtop into the lake on lap 90 of the race. As a result of the crash in which he almost hit his head on the steering wheel, Moffat never again raced with an open faced helmet.

== Classes ==
Cars competed in four engine capacity classes.

- Class A: Up to 1300cc
- Class B: 1301 – 2000cc
- Class C: 2001 – 3000cc
- Class D: Over 3000cc

== Results ==
Position	Drivers	No.	Car	Entrant	Laps
1	Peter Brock	1	Holden LJ Torana GTR XU-1	Holden Dealer Team	106
2	Colin Bond	24	Holden LJ Torana GTR XU-1	Holden Dealer Team	105
3	Barry Nixon-Smith	22	Holden LJ Torana GTR XU-1	Merrell Motors	99
4	Gil Davis	23	Holden LJ Torana GTR XU-1	N. Edwards	98
5	John Stoopman	30	Holden LJ Torana GTR XU-1	J. Stoopman	97
6	Ray Harrison	49	Alfa Romeo 2000 GTV	A.F. & M. Beninca	96
7	Cam Richardson	7	Holden LJ Torana GTR XU-1	Feltham Team Racing	94
8	Bill Evans	56	Datsun 1200 Coupe	Datsun Racing Team	94
9	Roger Bonhomme	37	Holden LC Torana GTR	Mollison Motors P. L.	92
10	Kevin Kennedy	29	Holden LJ Torana GTR XU-1	K. H. Kennedy	92
	Class A : Up to 1300cc				
1	Bill Evans	56	Datsun 1200 Coupe	Datsun Racing Team	94
2	Noel Riley	63	Honda Civic	Bennett Honda	91
3	John Lord	54	Morris Cooper S	Lord Co. (Aust.) P. L.	89
4	John Bundy	61	Morris Cooper S	J. Bundy	82
?	Lakis Manticas	55	Fiat 128 Coupe	Formula 1 Europa Garage	?
?	Geoff Newton	62	Morris Cooper S	G. Newton	?
?	Lynne De Luca, Darrylyn Huitt	59	Mazda 1300	G. R. Berry	?
?	Rod Murphy	64	Honda Civic	Honda Sales P. L.	?
DNF	James Laing-Peach	57	Datsun 1200 Coupe	Datsun Racing Team	?
	Class B : 1301 – 2000cc				
1	Ray Harrison	49	Alfa Romeo 2000 GTV	A.F. & M. Beninca	96
2	Mel Mollison	45	Mazda RX-3	Mazda Racing Team	92
3	Raymond Harrison	50	Mazda R100 Coupe	R. Harrison	81
?	Geoff Perry	48	Mazda RX-3	Mazda Racing Team	92
?	Geoff Wade	38	Ford Escort Twin Cam	Peter Mac's Towing	?
DNF	Christine Cole, Sue Ransom	40	Alfa Romeo 2000 GTV	Chesterfield Filter Racing	?
DNF	Graham Ritter	44	Ford Escort Twin Cam	Strapp Ford	?
DNF	Bob Holden	43	Ford Escort Twin Cam	Brian Byrt Ford	?
	Class C : 2001 – 3000cc				
1	Roger Bonhomme	37	Holden LC Torana GTR	Mollison Motors P. L.	92
2	Gary Cooke	35	Mazda RX-2	James Mason Motors	91
3	Tony Roberts	36	Datsun 240K	Tony Roberts Auto Centre	90
	Class D : Over 3000cc				
1	Peter Brock	1	Holden LJ Torana GTR XU-1	Holden Dealer Team	106
2	Colin Bond	24	Holden LJ Torana GTR XU-1	Holden Dealer Team	105
3	Barry Nixon-Smith	22	Holden LJ Torana GTR XU-1	Merrell Motors	99
4	Gil Davis	23	Holden LJ Torana GTR XU-1	N. Edwards	98
5	John Stoopman	30	Holden LJ Torana GTR XU-1	J. Stoopman	97
6	Cam Richardson	7	Holden LJ Torana GTR XU-1	Feltham Team Racing	94
7	Kevin Kennedy	29	Holden LJ Torana GTR XU-1	K. H. Kennedy	92
8	Murray Carter	15	Ford XA Falcon GT	Murray Carter / Shell Racing	91
9	Graeme Blanchard	16	Holden LJ Torana GTR XU-1	G. Blanchard	85
10	Brian Ovenden	31	Chrysler VH Valiant Charger	B. Ovenden	78
?	Robert Bride	10	Holden LJ Torana GTR XU-1	ACI Fibreglass	?
?	Rod McRae	12	Holden LJ Torana GTR XU-1	Dustings of Burwood	?
?	Phillip Brock, Tom Naughton	4	Chrysler VH Valiant Charger	Motor Racing Ins. Service	?
DNF	Fred Gibson	6	Ford XA Falcon GT	Ford Australia	95
DNF	Allan Moffat	9	Ford XA Falcon GT	Ford Australia	89
DNF	John Harvey		Holden LJ Torana GTR XU-1	Bob Jane Racing	?
DNF	Tony Niovanni	21	Holden LJ Torana GTR XU-1	Peter Robinson Motors	?
DNF	Stuart Saker	27	Holden LJ Torana GTR XU-1	S. Saker	?
DNF	John Goss	5	Ford XA Falcon GT	McLeod Ford / Shell Racing	?
DNF	Lawrie Nelson	8	Chrysler VH Valiant Charger	L. Nelson	0

=== Notes ===
- Entries in Official Souvenir Programme: 47
- Entries on Starting Position Grid Sheet: 39
- Pole Position: Allan Moffat (Ford Falcon GT), 1m 59.8
