= 2011 International V8 Supercars Championship =

Motor racing competition

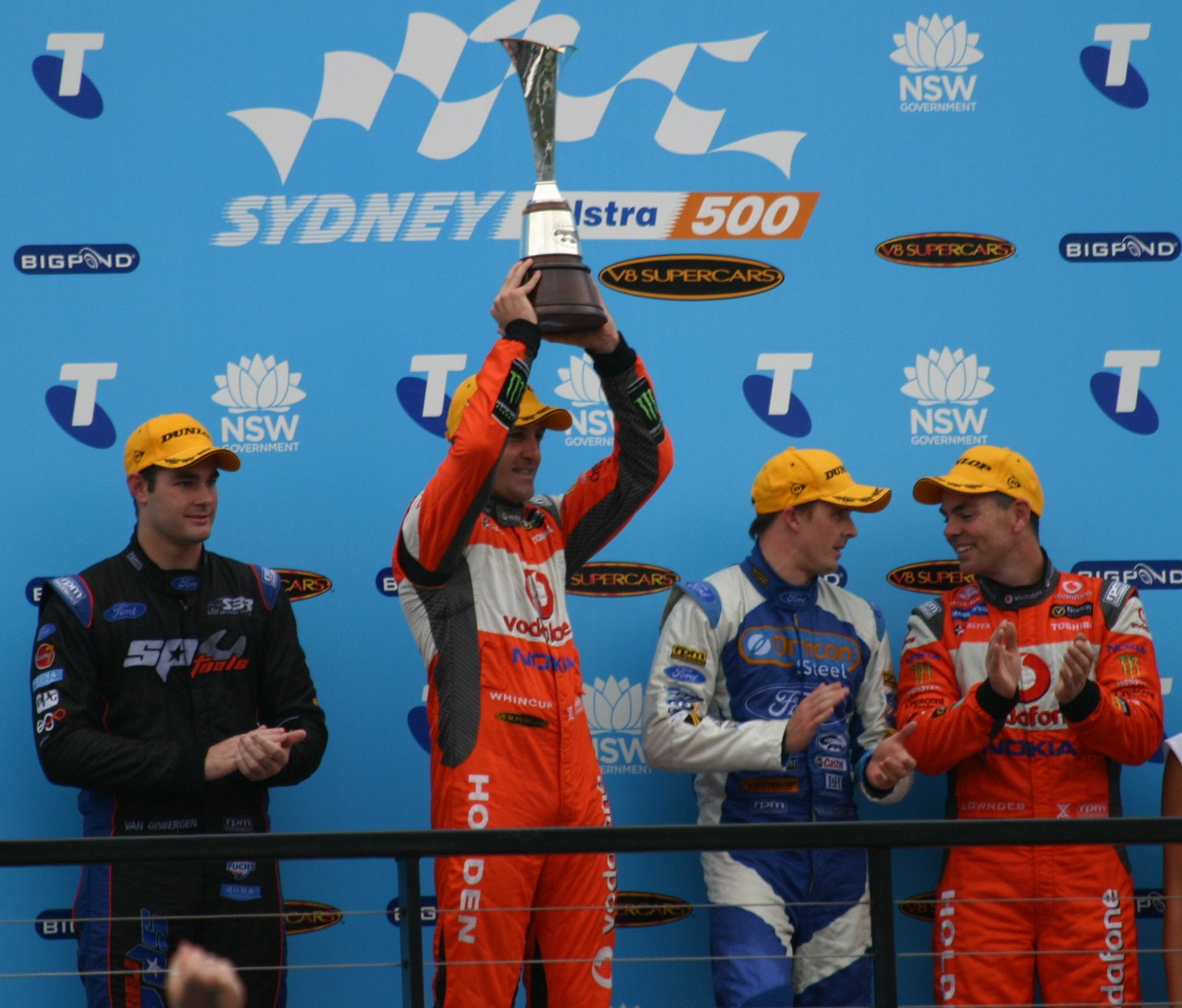
The top 4 in the championship, from L to R: Shane van Gisbergen (4th), Jamie Whincup (1st), Mark Winterbottom (3rd), Craig Lowndes (2nd)

The 2011 International V8 Supercar Championship (often simplified to the 2011 V8 Supercars Championship) was an FIA sanctioned international motor racing series for V8 Supercars. It was the thirteenth V8 Supercar Championship Series and the fifteenth series in which V8 Supercars contested the premier Australian touring car title. It was also the first since the series was elevated to the 'International category' status by the FIA.

The championship began on 10 February in the Middle East at Abu Dhabi's Yas Marina Circuit and finished on 4 December at the Homebush Street Circuit.

Jamie Whincup and Triple Eight Race Engineering started the season as the defending drivers' and teams' champions.

Whincup successfully defended his drivers' championship, with Triple Eight Race Engineering also wrapping up the teams' championship. Whincup's teammate Craig Lowndes took second in the points standings from Mark Winterbottom of Ford Performance Racing.

== Teams and drivers ==
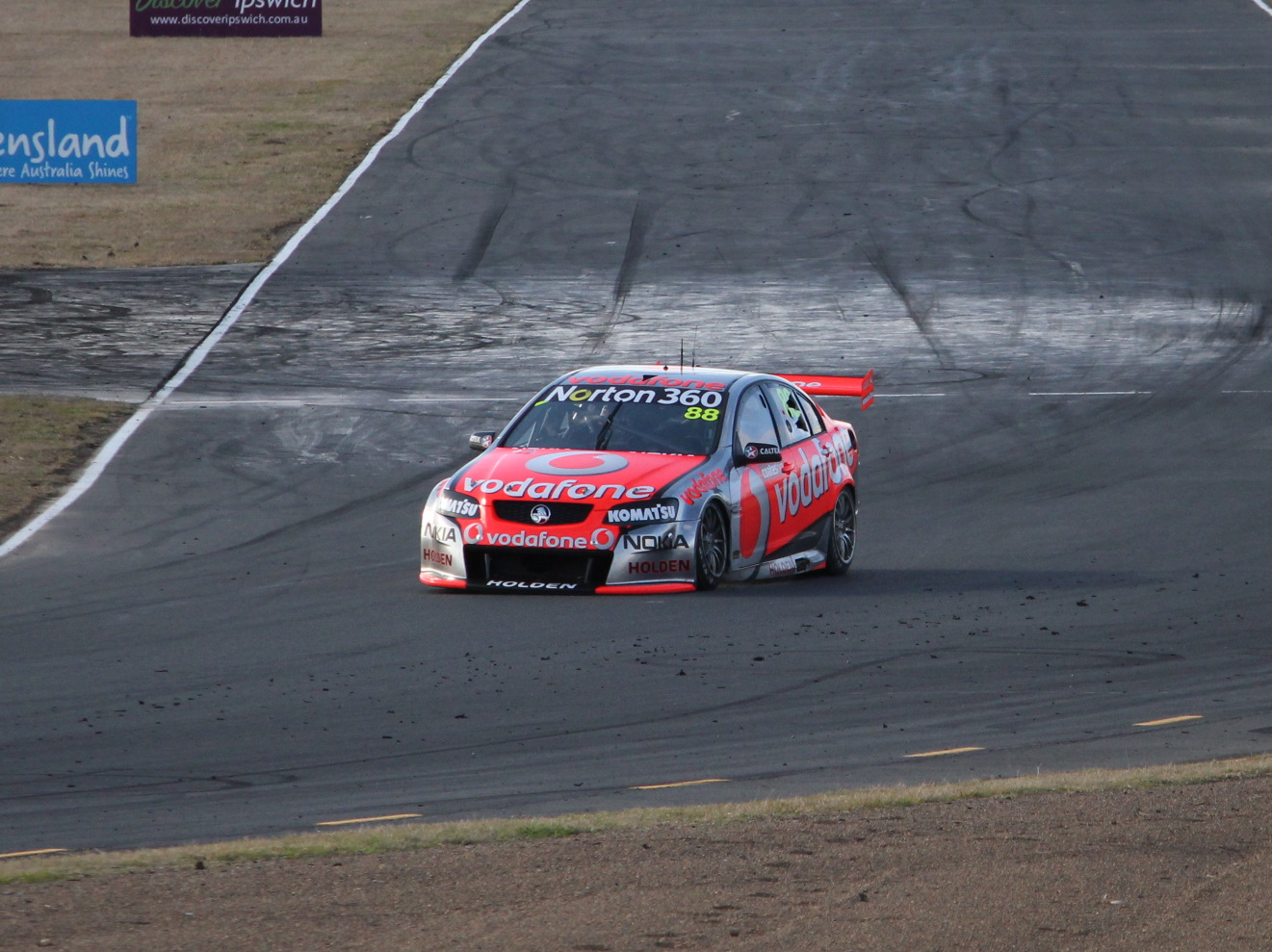
Jamie Whincup won the 2011 V8 Supercars Championship

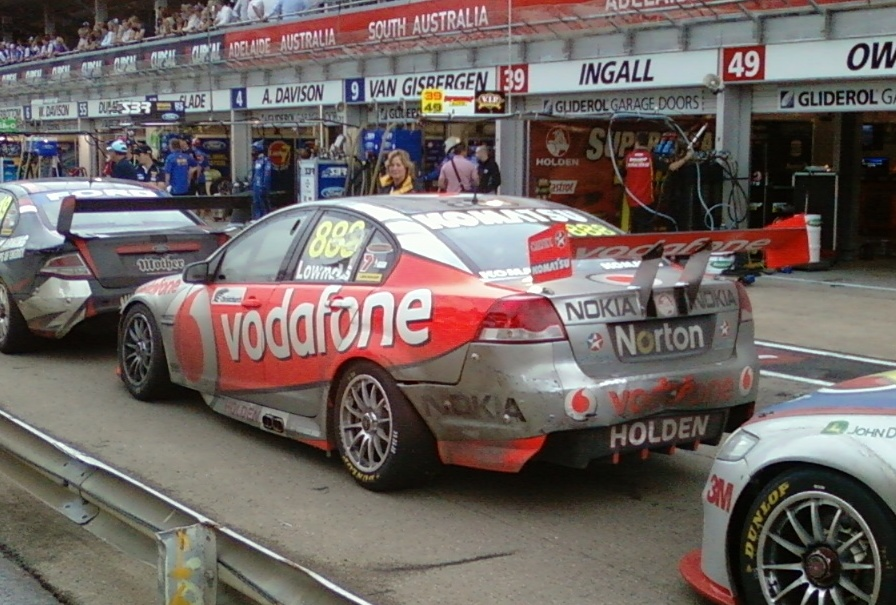
Craig Lowndes placed 2nd

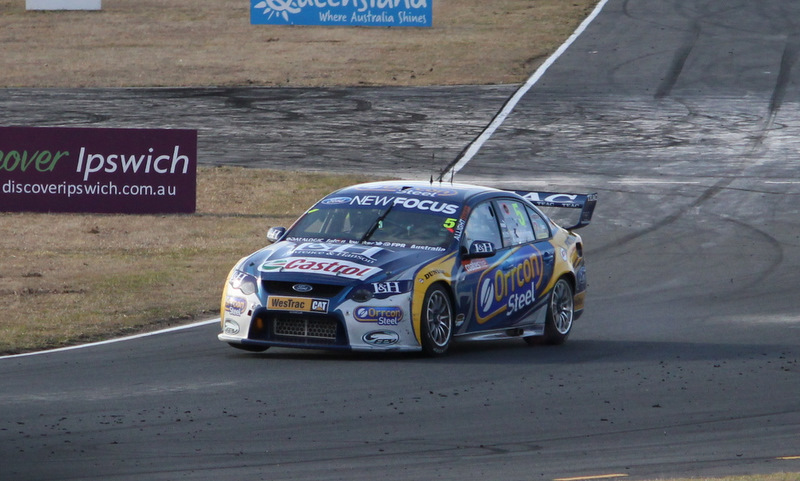
Mark Winterbottom placed 3rd

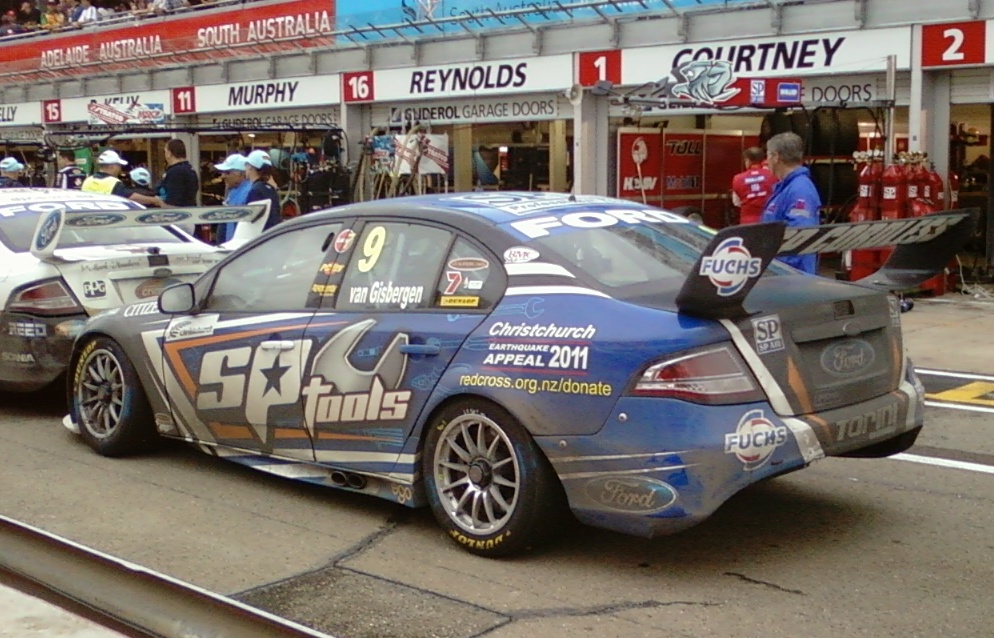
Shane van Gisbergen placed 4th

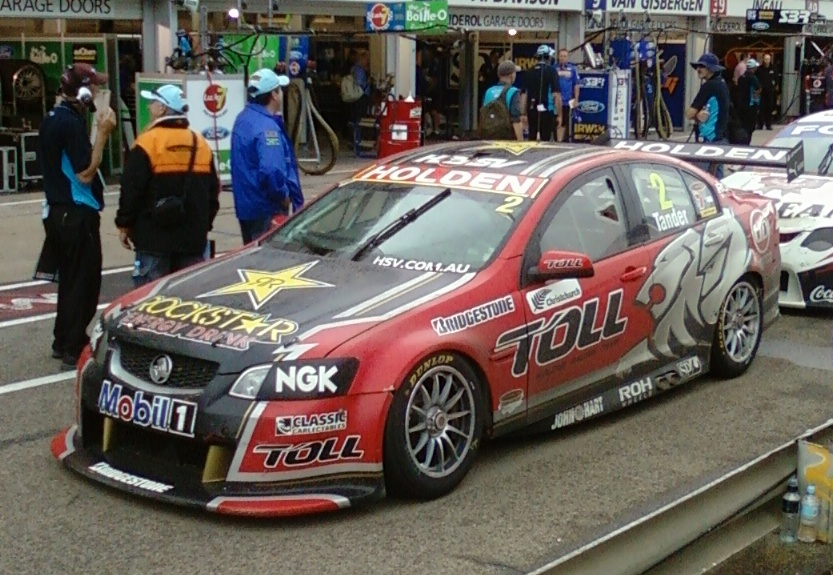
Garth Tander placed 5th

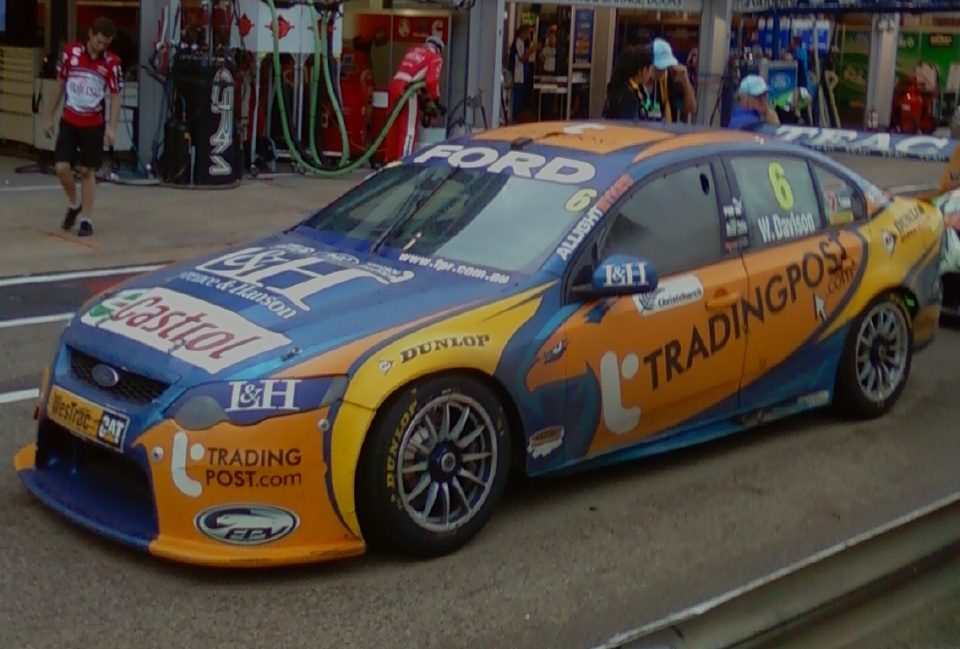
Will Davison placed 7th

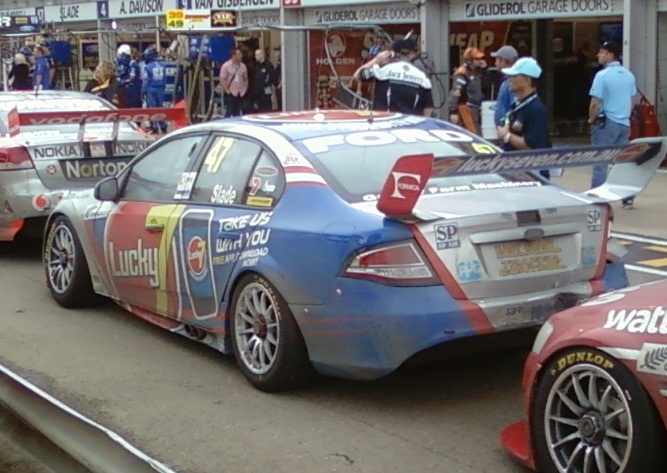
Tim Slade placed 9th

The following teams and drivers competed in the 2011 championship.

| Championship entries | | | | | | Endurance entries | |
| Manufacturer | Model | Team | No. | Driver name | Rounds | Phillip Island/Bathurst | Gold Coast |
|---|---|---|---|---|---|---|---|
| Ford | Falcon FG | Tony D'Alberto Racing | 3 | (Australia) Tony D'Alberto | 2–8, 10–14 | (Australia) Dale Wood | (Italy) Vitantonio Liuzzi |
| Ford | Falcon FG | Tony D'Alberto Racing | 3 | (Australia) Taz Douglas | 9 | (Australia) Dale Wood | (Italy) Vitantonio Liuzzi |
| Ford | Falcon FG | Stone Brothers Racing | 4 | (Australia) Alex Davison | All | (Australia) David Brabham | (Germany) Marc Lieb |
| Ford | Falcon FG | Stone Brothers Racing | 9 | (New Zealand) Shane van Gisbergen | All | (New Zealand) John McIntyre | (Italy) Emanuele Pirro |
| Ford | Falcon FG | Ford Performance Racing | 5 | (Australia) Mark Winterbottom | All | (New Zealand) Steven Richards | (United Kingdom) Richard Lyons (Note: Will Power was due to take part in the Gold Coast 600, but was forced to withdraw after sustaining a back injury at the 2011 IZOD IndyCar World Championship.) |
| Ford | Falcon FG | Ford Performance Racing | 6 | (Australia) Will Davison | All | (Australia) Luke Youlden | (Finland) Mika Salo |
| Ford | Falcon FG | Triple F Racing | 12 | (Australia) Dean Fiore | All | (Australia) Michael Patrizi | (Italy) Gianni Morbidelli |
| Ford | Falcon FG | Dick Johnson Racing | 17 | (Australia) Steven Johnson | All | (Australia) David Besnard | (Germany) Dirk Müller |
| Ford | Falcon FG | Dick Johnson Racing | 18 | (Australia) James Moffat | All | (New Zealand) Matt Halliday | (United States) Joey Hand |
| Ford | Falcon FG | Tekno Autosports | 19 | (Australia) Jonathon Webb | All | (United Kingdom) Richard Lyons | (Brazil) Gil de Ferran |
| Ford | Falcon FG | James Rosenberg Racing (SBR) | 47 | (Australia) Tim Slade | All | (New Zealand) Daniel Gaunt | (Brazil) Hélio Castroneves |
| Ford | Falcon FG | Rod Nash Racing (FPR) | 55 | (Australia) Paul Dumbrell | All | (Australia) Dean Canto | (Austria) Christian Klien |
| Holden | Commodore VE | Holden Racing Team | 1 | (Australia) James Courtney | All | (Australia) Cameron McConville | (United Kingdom) Darren Turner (Note: Dan Wheldon was originally scheduled to drive alongside James Courtney at the Gold Coast 600, but was killed in an accident at the 2011 IZOD IndyCar World Championship one week before the race.) |
| Holden | Commodore VE | Holden Racing Team | 2 | (Australia) Garth Tander | All | (Australia) Nick Percat | (Australia) Ryan Briscoe |
| Holden | Commodore VE | Tony D'Alberto Racing | 3 | (Australia) Tony D'Alberto | 1 | —N/a | |
| Holden | Commodore VE | Kelly Racing | 7 | (Australia) Todd Kelly | All | (Australia) David Russell | (United Kingdom) Richard Westbrook |
| Holden | Commodore VE | Kelly Racing | 11 | (New Zealand) Greg Murphy | All | (Denmark) Allan Simonsen | (United Kingdom) Oliver Gavin |
| Holden | Commodore VE | Kelly Racing | 15 | (Australia) Rick Kelly | All | (Australia) Owen Kelly | (Germany) Jörg Bergmeister |
| Holden | Commodore VE | Kelly Racing | 16 | (Australia) David Reynolds | All | (Australia) Tim Blanchard | (Canada) Alex Tagliani |
| Holden | Commodore VE | Brad Jones Racing | 8 | (Australia) Jason Bright | 1–12, 14 | (Australia) Andrew Jones | (France) Stéphane Sarrazin |
| Holden | Commodore VE | Brad Jones Racing | 8 | (Australia) Cameron McConville | 12 | —N/a | |
| Holden | Commodore VE | Brad Jones Racing | 8 | (Australia) Andrew Jones | 13 | —N/a | |
| Holden | Commodore VE | Brad Jones Racing | 14 | (Australia) Jason Bargwanna | All | (Australia) Shane Price | (Denmark) Allan Simonsen (Note: Tony Kanaan decided not to participate in the Gold Coast 600 following the death of Dan Wheldon.) |
| Holden | Commodore VE | Britek Motorsport (BJR) | 21 | (Australia) Karl Reindler | All | (Australia) David Wall | (Italy) Fabrizio Giovanardi |
| Holden | Commodore VE | Lucas Dumbrell Motorsport | 30 | (Australia) Warren Luff | All | (Australia) Nathan Pretty | (United Kingdom) Marino Franchitti |
| Holden | Commodore VE | Garry Rogers Motorsport | 33 | (Australia) Lee Holdsworth | All | (Australia) Greg Ritter | (France) Simon Pagenaud |
| Holden | Commodore VE | Garry Rogers Motorsport | 34 | (Australia) Michael Caruso | All | (Australia) Marcus Marshall | (Brazil) Augusto Farfus |
| Holden | Commodore VE | Paul Morris Motorsport | 39 | (Australia) Russell Ingall | All | (Australia) Jack Perkins | (Denmark) Jan Magnussen |
| Holden | Commodore VE | Paul Morris Motorsport | 49 | (Australia) Steve Owen | All | (Australia) Paul Morris | (United States) Boris Said |
| Holden | Commodore VE | Walkinshaw Racing (HRT) | 61 | (New Zealand) Fabian Coulthard | All | (New Zealand) Craig Baird | (United States) Patrick Long |
| Holden | Commodore VE | Triple Eight Race Engineering | 88 | (Australia) Jamie Whincup | All | (Australia) Andrew Thompson | (France) Sébastien Bourdais |
| Holden | Commodore VE | Triple Eight Race Engineering | 888 | (Australia) Craig Lowndes | All | (Australia) Mark Skaife | (United Kingdom) Andy Priaulx |
Wildcard entries
| Holden | Commodore VE | Kelly Racing | 77 | —N/a | 10 | (Australia) Grant Denyer (Australia) Cam Waters | —N/a |

=== Team changes ===
Tekno Autosports and driver Jonathon Webb ended their association with Dick Johnson Racing to run the team separately with support from Triple Eight Race Engineering.

Walkinshaw Racing downsized to a single-car team, with the #10 Racing Entitlement Contract initially placed for sale. It was subsequently purchased by the category's organising body V8 Supercars Australia to achieve their long-held ambition to reduce the grid to twenty-eight cars.

After a long-running dispute over the ownership of Dick Johnson Racing, co-owner Charlie Schwerkolt sold his stake in the team and departed with the No. 18 Racing Entitlement Contract. The REC was later leased back to DJR to continue running two cars.

Tony D'Alberto Racing switched from Holden to Ford for the 2011 season. D'Alberto ran a Holden Commodore at the season-opening Abu Dhabi race before switching to Ford ahead of the Adelaide 500.

=== Driver changes ===
James Courtney bought the #1 plate to the Holden Racing Team to replace the outgoing Will Davison.

Davison joined Ford Performance Racing in a manufacturer switch, replacing Steven Richards, who retired from full-time driving.

James Moffat then joined Dick Johnson Racing, replacing Courtney. It was the first time in 22 years that the Moffat name had been on the grid.

2010 Walkinshaw Racing endurance co-driver David Reynolds joined Kelly Racing in the #16 Commodore, replacing Tony Ricciardello. Greg Murphy also joined Kelly Racing, to replace the departing Jason Bargwanna.

Bargwanna joined Brad Jones Racing as a substitute for Jason Richards, who was undergoing treatment for adrenocortical carcinoma during the season. Richards later passed away in December.

Reigning Fujitsu V8 Supercar Series champion Steve Owen was confirmed as Murphy's replacement at Paul Morris Motorsport.

=== Mid-season changes ===
Tony D'Alberto was forced to sit out the Phillip Island 500 after being diagnosed with chicken pox. Taz Douglas replaced him for the event.

Jason Bright was injured and unable to take part in Race 24 at Symmons Plains. Cameron McConville replaced him for the race. Bright later withdrew from the next race at Sandown, where he was replaced by his endurance co-driver Andrew Jones.

=== Wildcard entries ===
Only two endurance race wild cards were approved for 2011. Fujitsu Series team Miles Racing applied to run Ashley Walsh and Chaz Mostert but the team later elected not to utilise it. Kelly Racing entered a fifth car for the winner of the Shannons Supercar Showdown, who would co-drive with the show's narrator and experienced driver Grant Denyer. At the show's conclusion a week prior to the Bathurst 1000, leading Formula Ford driver Cam Waters was announced as the winner.

== Calendar ==
The following circuits hosted a round of the 2011 championship.

| Rnd. | Event name | Circuit | Date |
|---|---|---|---|
| 1 | (United Arab Emirates) Yas V8 400 | Yas Marina Circuit, Yas Island | 10–12 Feb |
| 2 | (South Australia) Adelaide 500 | Adelaide Street Circuit, Adelaide | 17–20 Mar |
| 3 | (New Zealand) Hamilton 400 | Hamilton Street Circuit, Hamilton | 15–17 Apr |
| 4 | (Western Australia) Perth Challenge | Barbagallo Raceway, Wanneroo | 29 Apr–1 May |
| 5 | (Victoria (state)) Winton | Winton Motor Raceway, Benalla | 20–22 May |
| 6 | (Northern Territory) Darwin Triple Crown | Hidden Valley Raceway, Darwin | 17–19 Jun |
| 7 | (Queensland) Townsville 400 | Reid Park Street Circuit, Townsville | 8–10 Jul |
| 8 | (Queensland) Ipswich 300 | Queensland Raceway, Ipswich | 19–21 Aug |
| 9 | (Victoria (state)) Phillip Island 500 | Phillip Island Grand Prix Circuit, Phillip Island | 16–18 Sep |
| 10 | (New South Wales) Bathurst 1000 | Mount Panorama Circuit, Bathurst | 6–9 Oct |
| 11 | (Queensland) Gold Coast 600 | Surfers Paradise Street Circuit, Surfers Paradise | 21–23 Oct |
| 12 | Tasmania Challenge | Symmons Plains Raceway, Launceston | 11–13 Nov |
| 13 | (Victoria (state)) Sandown Challenge | Sandown Raceway, Melbourne | 18–20 Nov |
| 14 | (New South Wales) Sydney 500 | Homebush Street Circuit, Sydney | 2–4 Dec |

Australian rounds
New Zealand rounds
United Arab Emirates rounds

=== Calendar changes ===
The event at Barbagallo Raceway was reinstated with the Western Australian Government providing $5 million to redevelop the circuit. The Desert 400 was scrapped with V8 Supercars stating that the decision not to hold the event was because the circuit's international racing calendar was too full for an early season date.

== Results and standings ==
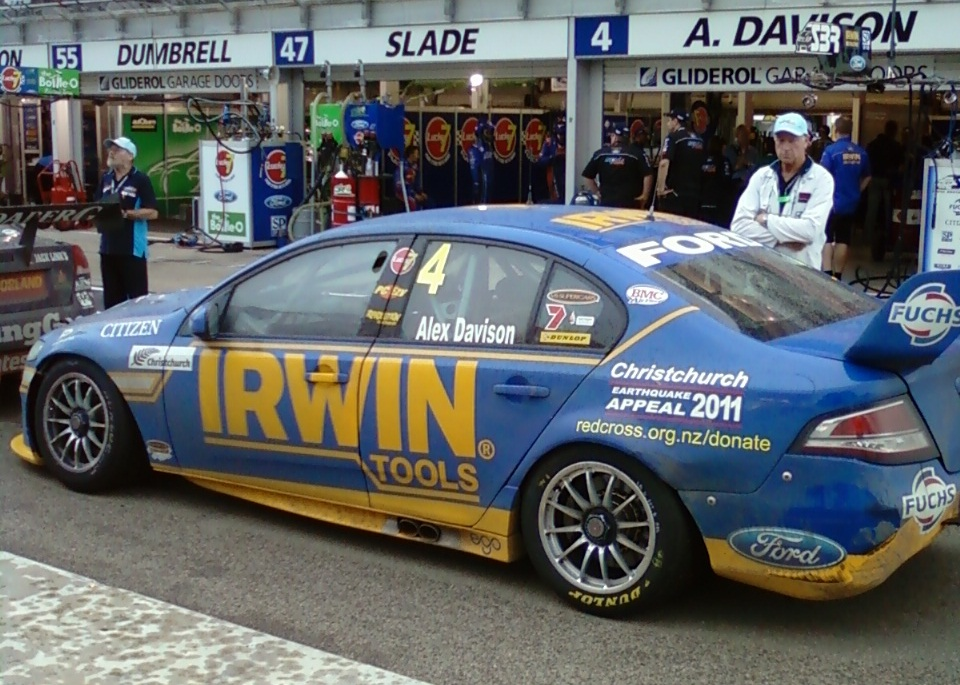
Alex Davison placed 11th

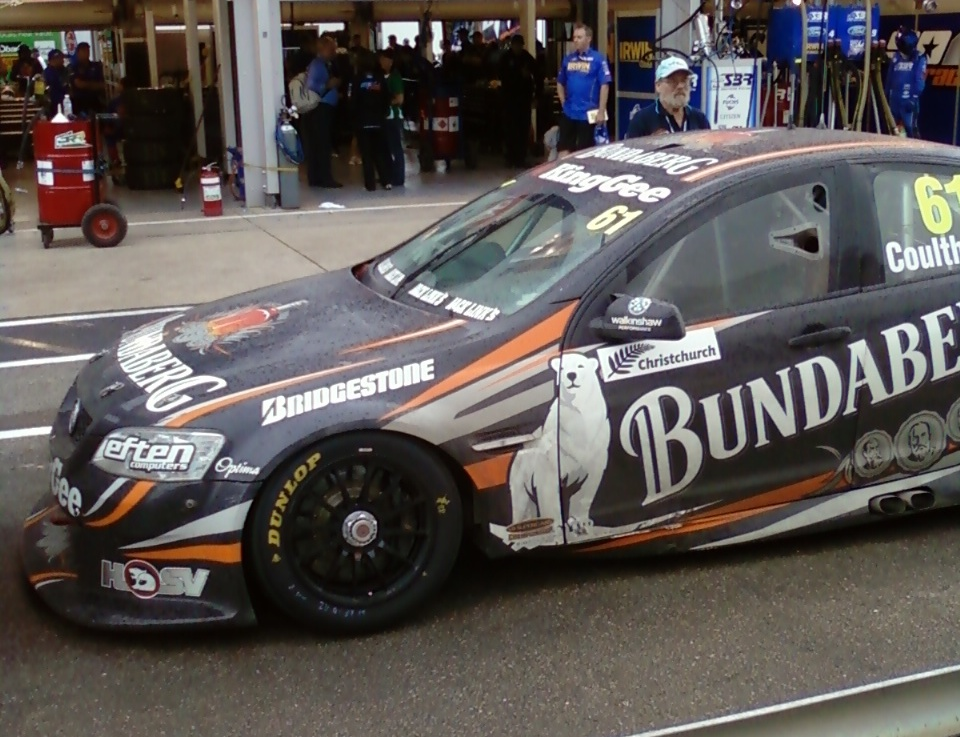
Fabian Coulthard placed 12th

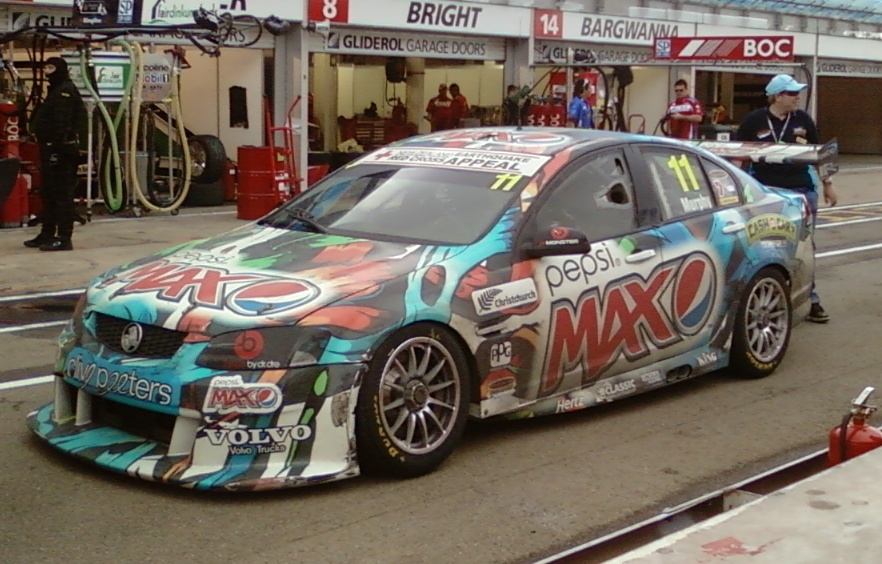
Greg Murphy placed 13th

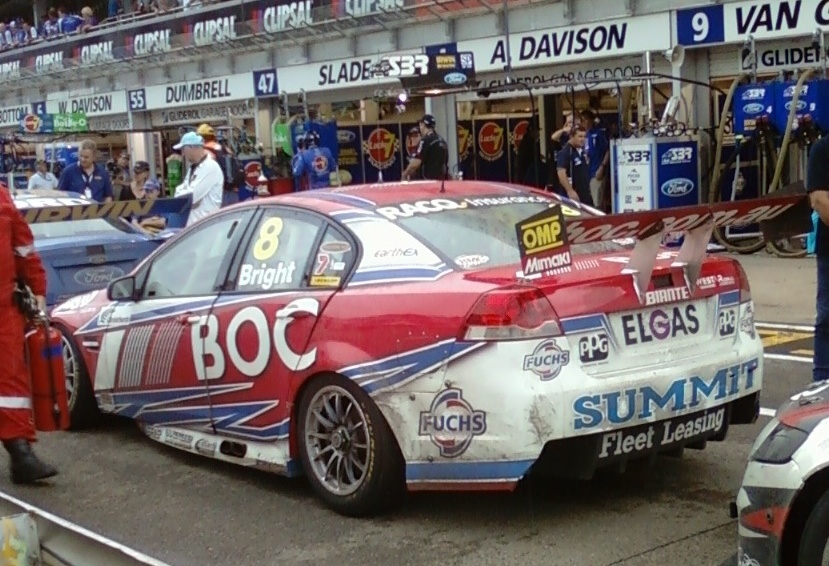
Jason Bright placed 16th

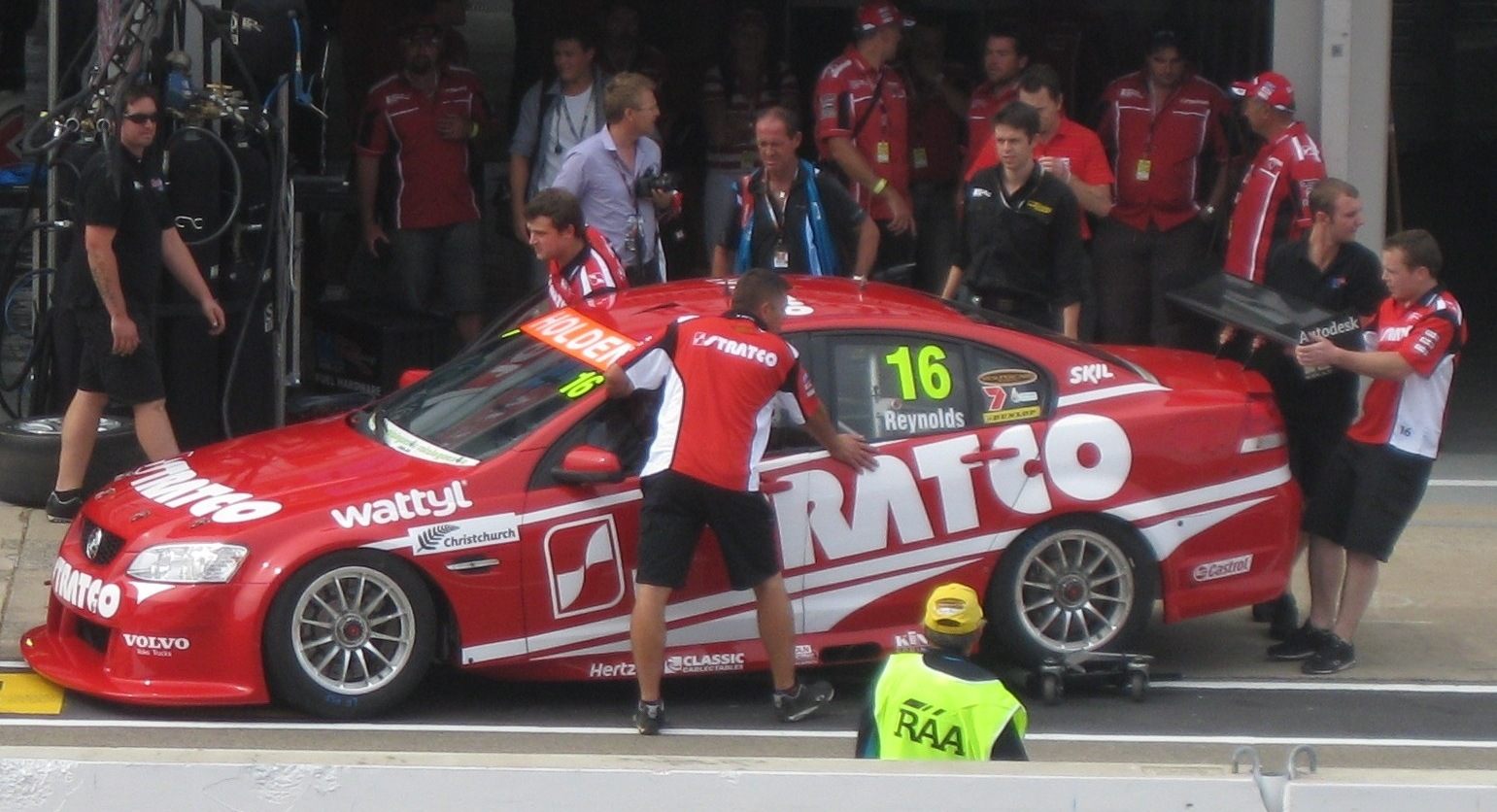
David Reynolds placed 19th

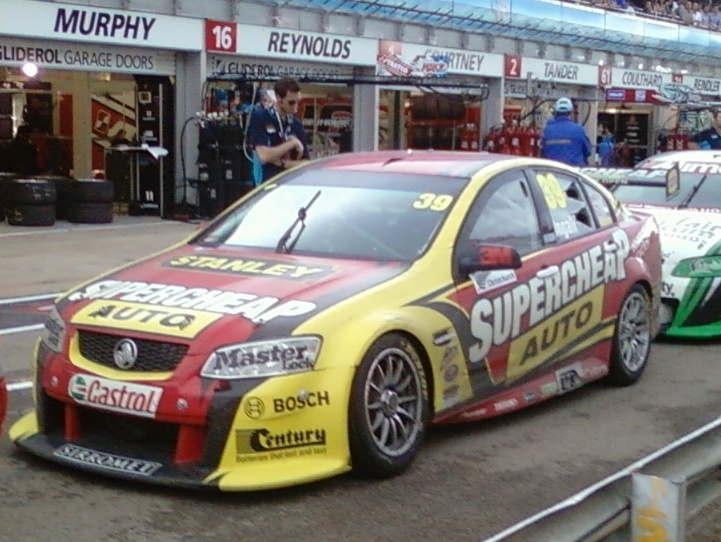
Russell Ingall placed 20th

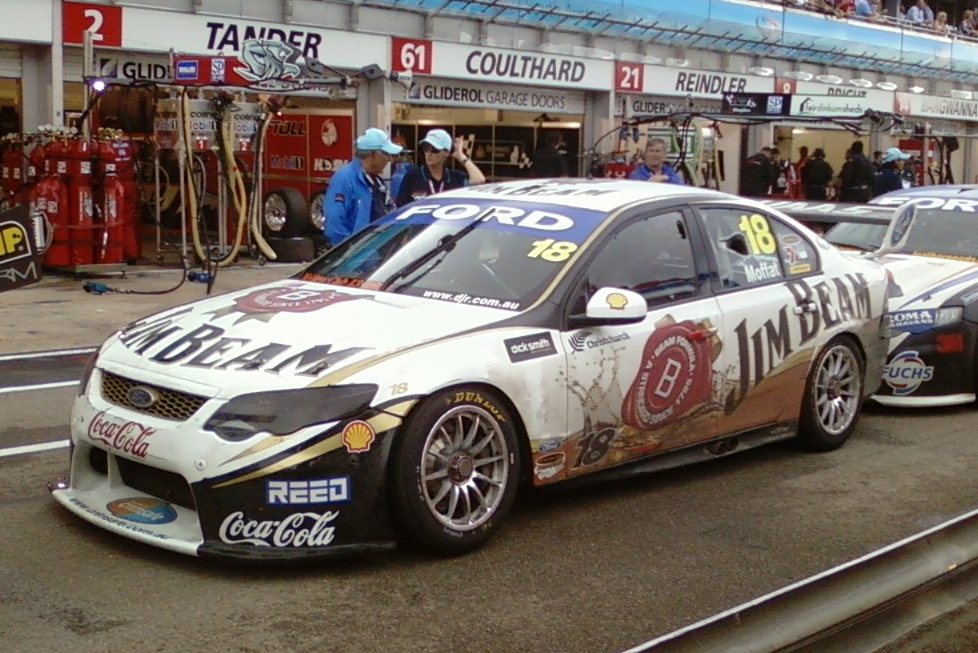
James Moffat placed 23rd

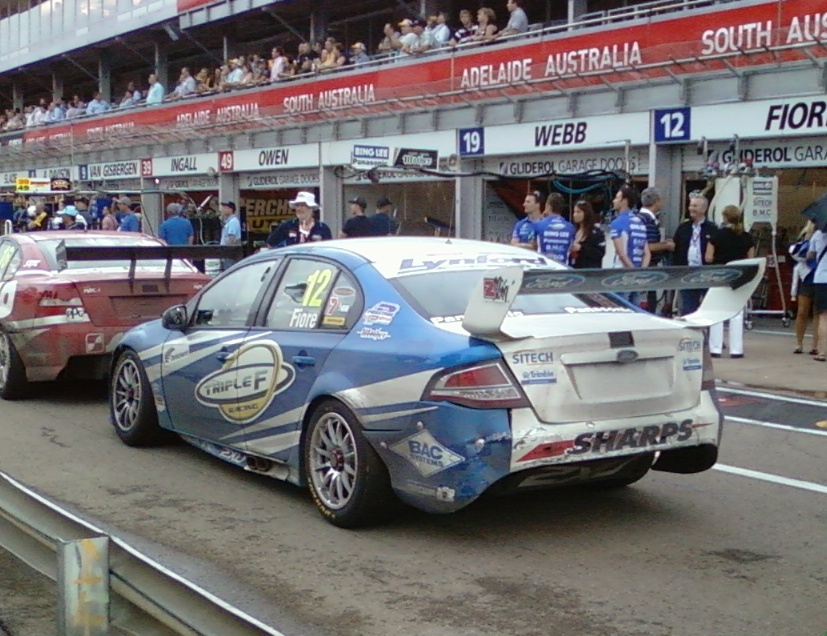
Dean Fiore placed 27th

=== Season summary ===
| Round | Race | Event | Pole position | Fastest lap | Winning driver | Winning team | Report |
|---|---|---|---|---|---|---|---|
| 1 | 1 | Yas V8 400 | (Australia) Craig Lowndes | (Australia) Jamie Whincup | (Australia) Jamie Whincup | Triple Eight Race Engineering | report |
| 1 | 2 | Yas V8 400 | (Australia) Jamie Whincup | (Australia) Jason Bargwanna | (Australia) James Courtney | Holden Racing Team | report |
| 2 | 3 | Adelaide 500 | (Australia) Garth Tander | (Australia) Will Davison | (Australia) Garth Tander | Holden Racing Team | report |
| 2 | 4 | Adelaide 500 | (Australia) Will Davison | (Australia) Jamie Whincup | (Australia) Jamie Whincup | Triple Eight Race Engineering | report |
| 3 | 5 | Hamilton 400 | (Australia) Jamie Whincup | (Australia) Michael Caruso | (Australia) Rick Kelly | Kelly Racing | report |
| 3 | 6 | Hamilton 400 | (Australia) Rick Kelly | (Australia) Jamie Whincup | (New Zealand) Shane Van Gisbergen | Stone Brothers Racing | report |
| 4 | 7 | Perth Challenge | (Australia) Jamie Whincup | (Australia) Jamie Whincup | (Australia) Jamie Whincup | Triple Eight Race Engineering | report |
| 4 | 8 | Perth Challenge | (Australia) Jason Bright | (New Zealand) Fabian Coulthard | (Australia) Jason Bright | Brad Jones Racing | report |
| 4 | 9 | Perth Challenge | (Australia) Jamie Whincup | (Australia) Jason Bright | (Australia) Jamie Whincup | Triple Eight Race Engineering | report |
| 5 | 10 | Winton | (Australia) Craig Lowndes | (Australia) Michael Caruso | (Australia) Jamie Whincup | Triple Eight Race Engineering | report |
| 5 | 11 | Winton | (Australia) Mark Winterbottom | (New Zealand) Shane Van Gisbergen | (Australia) Jason Bright | Brad Jones Racing | report |
| 6 | 12 | Darwin Triple Crown | (Australia) Mark Winterbottom | (Australia) Russell Ingall | (Australia) Rick Kelly | Kelly Racing | report |
| 6 | 13 | Darwin Triple Crown | (Australia) Mark Winterbottom | (Australia) Michael Caruso | (New Zealand) Shane Van Gisbergen | Stone Brothers Racing | report |
| 7 | 14 | Townsville 400 | (Australia) Mark Winterbottom | (Australia) Lee Holdsworth | (Australia) Garth Tander | Holden Racing Team | report |
| 7 | 15 | Townsville 400 | (Australia) Craig Lowndes | (Australia) Tim Slade | (Australia) Jamie Whincup | Triple Eight Race Engineering | report |
| 8 | 16 | Ipswich 300 | (Australia) Craig Lowndes | (Australia) Craig Lowndes | (Australia) Craig Lowndes | Triple Eight Race Engineering | report |
| 8 | 17 | Ipswich 300 | (Australia) Craig Lowndes | (Australia) Jamie Whincup | (Australia) Craig Lowndes | Triple Eight Race Engineering | report |
| 8 | 18 | Ipswich 300 | (Australia) Craig Lowndes | (Australia) Jamie Whincup | (Australia) Craig Lowndes | Triple Eight Race Engineering | report |
| 9 | 19 | Phillip Island 500 | (Australia) Will Davison (Australia) Luke Youlden | (Australia) Craig Lowndes | (Australia) Craig Lowndes (Australia) Mark Skaife | Triple Eight Race Engineering | report |
| 10 | 20 | Bathurst 1000 | (New Zealand) Greg Murphy (Denmark) Allan Simonsen | (Australia) Jamie Whincup | (Australia) Garth Tander (Australia) Nick Percat | Holden Racing Team | report |
| 11 | 21 | Gold Coast 600 | (Australia) Jamie Whincup | (Australia) James Moffat | (Australia) Jamie Whincup (France) Sébastien Bourdais | Triple Eight Race Engineering | report |
| 11 | 22 | Gold Coast 600 | (Australia) Jamie Whincup | (Australia) Will Davison | (Australia) Mark Winterbottom (United Kingdom) Richard Lyons | Ford Performance Racing | report |
| 12 | 23 | Tasmania Challenge | (Australia) Jamie Whincup | (Australia) Garth Tander | (Australia) Jamie Whincup | Triple Eight Race Engineering | report |
| 12 | 24 | Tasmania Challenge | (Australia) Paul Dumbrell | (Australia) Mark Winterbottom | (Australia) Jamie Whincup | Triple Eight Race Engineering | report |
| 13 | 25 | Sandown Challenge | (Australia) Rick Kelly | (Australia) Rick Kelly | (Australia) Rick Kelly | Kelly Racing | report |
| 13 | 26 | Sandown Challenge | (Australia) Jamie Whincup | (Australia) Garth Tander | (Australia) Jamie Whincup | Triple Eight Race Engineering | report |
| 14 | 27 | Sydney 500 | (Australia) Will Davison | (Australia) Jamie Whincup | (Australia) Craig Lowndes | Triple Eight Race Engineering | report |
| 14 | 28 | Sydney 500 | (Australia) Will Davison | (Australia) Craig Lowndes | (Australia) Mark Winterbottom | Ford Performance Racing | report |

=== Points system ===
Points are awarded to the driver or drivers of a car that completes 75% of the race distance and is running at the completion of the final lap. The different points scales adapt to each event, having one, two or three races, making sure that a driver gets 300 points if they win all races of the event.

| Event format | Position | | | | | | | | | | | | | | | | | | | | | | | | | | | | |
| Event format | 1st | 2nd | 3rd | 4th | 5th | 6th | 7th | 8th | 9th | 10th | 11th | 12th | 13th | 14th | 15th | 16th | 17th | 18th | 19th | 20th | 21st | 22nd | 23rd | 24th | 25th | 26th | 27th | 28th | 29th |
|---|---|---|---|---|---|---|---|---|---|---|---|---|---|---|---|---|---|---|---|---|---|---|---|---|---|---|---|---|---|
| Std. | 150 | 138 | 129 | 120 | 111 | 102 | 96 | 90 | 84 | 78 | 72 | 69 | 66 | 63 | 60 | 57 | 54 | 51 | 48 | 45 | 42 | 39 | 36 | 33 | 30 | 27 | 24 | 21 | —N/a |
| Perth | 100 | 92 | 86 | 80 | 74 | 68 | 64 | 60 | 56 | 52 | 48 | 46 | 44 | 42 | 40 | 38 | 36 | 34 | 32 | 30 | 28 | 26 | 24 | 22 | 20 | 18 | 16 | 14 | —N/a |
| Ipswich R16/17 | 75 | 69 | 65 | 60 | 56 | 51 | 48 | 45 | 42 | 39 | 36 | 35 | 33 | 32 | 30 | 29 | 27 | 26 | 24 | 23 | 21 | 20 | 18 | 17 | 15 | 14 | 12 | 11 | —N/a |
| Phillip Island 500 Qualifying Races | 50 | 46 | 43 | 40 | 37 | 34 | 32 | 30 | 28 | 26 | 24 | 23 | 22 | 21 | 20 | 19 | 18 | 17 | 16 | 15 | 14 | 13 | 12 | 11 | 10 | 9 | 8 | 7 | —N/a |
| Phillip Island 500 | 200 | 184 | 172 | 160 | 148 | 136 | 128 | 120 | 112 | 104 | 96 | 92 | 88 | 84 | 80 | 76 | 72 | 68 | 64 | 60 | 56 | 52 | 48 | 44 | 40 | 36 | 32 | 28 | —N/a |
| Bathurst 1000 | 300 | 276 | 258 | 240 | 222 | 204 | 192 | 180 | 168 | 156 | 144 | 138 | 132 | 126 | 120 | 114 | 108 | 102 | 96 | 90 | 84 | 78 | 72 | 66 | 60 | 54 | 48 | 42 | 36 |

Notes:

Std. denotes all races except the Perth Challenge, Ipswich 300, Phillip Island 500, and the Bathurst 1000. These four events have unique rules.

Perth Challenge: This event consisted of three races. The total points were divided between each race evenly.

Ipswich 300: This event consisted of three races. Due to their short length, Races 16 and 17 only awarded half the points of a usual race. Race 18 used the standard points system.

Phillip Island 500: The Phillip Island event was split into two qualifying races and a 500-kilometre feature race. The two drivers per team were grouped into separate qualifying races that counted towards drivers' individual point totals and towards the starting grid for the feature race. The two drivers then shared one car for the 500-kilometre endurance race.

Bathurst 1000: Two drivers shared one car for the race.

=== Drivers' championship ===
| Pos. | Driver | No. | YMC (United Arab Emirates) | | ADE (South Australia) | | HAM (New Zealand) | | BAR (Western Australia) | | | WIN (Victoria (state)) | | HID (Northern Territory) | | TOW (Queensland) | | QLD (Queensland) | | | PHI (Victoria (state)) | BAT (New South Wales) | SUR (Queensland) | | SYM (Tasmania) | | SAN (Victoria (state)) | | SYD (New South Wales) | | Pen. | Pts. |
|---|---|---|---|---|---|---|---|---|---|---|---|---|---|---|---|---|---|---|---|---|---|---|---|---|---|---|---|---|---|---|---|---|
| 1 | (Australia) Jamie Whincup | 88 | 1 | **3** | 2 | 1 | **23** | 18 | **1** | **2** | **1** | 1 | 2 | 9 | 6 | 2 | 1 | 3 | 2 | 10 | 2 | 21 | **1** | **2** | **1** | 1 | 13 | **1** | 20 | 8 | 25 | 3168 |
| 2 | (Australia) Craig Lowndes | 888 | **7** | 21 | 3 | 12 | 2 | 10 | 2 | 4 | 4 | **11** | 7 | 3 | 2 | 4 | **2** | **1** | **1** | **1** | 1 | 2 | Ret | 20 | 2 | 5 | 6 | 4 | 1 | 2 | 0 | 3133 |
| 3 | (Australia) Mark Winterbottom | 5 | 3 | 14 | 6 | 3 | 4 | Ret | 8 | 13 | 26 | 9 | **19** | **15** | **3** | **5** | 3 | 13 | 10 | 19 | 17 | 4 | 3 | 1 | 4 | 3 | 7 | 2 | 5 | 1 | 25 | 2710 |
| 4 | (New Zealand) Shane van Gisbergen | 9 | 4 | 8 | 13 | 18 | 16 | 1 | 4 | 10 | 7 | 14 | 4 | 7 | 1 | 11 | 5 | 11 | 8 | 3 | 5 | 6 | 16 | 16 | 7 | 7 | 5 | 6 | 3 | 3 | 75 | 2672 |
| 5 | (Australia) Garth Tander | 2 | 6 | Ret | **1** | 5 | 18 | 3 | 13 | 7 | 3 | 12 | 3 | 18 | 26 | 1 | 26 | 28 | 23 | 6 | 4 | 1 | 11 | 23 | 3 | 6 | 8 | 5 | 2 | 19 | 0 | 2574 |
| 6 | (Australia) Rick Kelly | 15 | 13 | 19 | 12 | 2 | 1 | **6** | 9 | 16 | 12 | 4 | 17 | 1 | 20 | 7 | 13 | 4 | 4 | 17 | 8 | 22 | 7 | 5 | 14 | 12 | **1** | 9 | 10 | 12 | 25 | 2358 |
| 7 | (Australia) Will Davison | 6 | 12 | 16 | 9 | **7** | 6 | 4 | 3 | 8 | 15 | 13 | 24 | 5 | 7 | 3 | 18 | 15 | 15 | 21 | **3** | 18 | 2 | 14 | 5 | 2 | 4 | 3 | **Ret** | **Ret** | 0 | 2345 |
| 8 | (Australia) Lee Holdsworth | 33 | 9 | 22 | 20 | Ret | 22 | 2 | 16 | 9 | 18 | 2 | 15 | 4 | 15 | 6 | 6 | 7 | 11 | 18 | 12 | 17 | 10 | 3 | 16 | 13 | 17 | 8 | 14 | Ret | 50 | 1920 |
| 9 | (Australia) Tim Slade | 47 | 5 | Ret | 8 | 13 | Ret | Ret | 22 | 5 | 9 | 15 | 13 | 21 | 4 | 25 | 7 | 2 | 3 | 2 | 24 | 12 | 12 | 10 | 12 | 27 | 15 | 7 | 6 | 10 | 0 | 1904 |
| 10 | (Australia) James Courtney | 1 | 26 | 1 | 24 | 4 | 11 | Ret | 10 | 26 | 5 | 8 | 25 | 25 | 24 | Ret | 19 | 20 | Ret | 12 | 9 | 7 | 14 | 6 | 10 | 11 | 2 | 11 | 7 | 7 | 75 | 1869 |
| 11 | (Australia) Alex Davison | 4 | 2 | 7 | 23 | 10 | 10 | 7 | 21 | 6 | 11 | 6 | 16 | 19 | 8 | 26 | 4 | 12 | 22 | 8 | 22 | 16 | 23 | 18 | 6 | 26 | 16 | 15 | 12 | Ret | 0 | 1850 |
| 12 | (New Zealand) Fabian Coulthard | 61 | 8 | 15 | 5 | 9 | 7 | Ret | 23 | 11 | 13 | 10 | 5 | 13 | 18 | 15 | 8 | 24 | 18 | 7 | 10 | Ret | 5 | 15 | 8 | 10 | 9 | 12 | 11 | Ret | 25 | 1839 |
| 13 | (New Zealand) Greg Murphy | 11 | 21 | 9 | 18 | 19 | 8 | Ret | 15 | 24 | 10 | 18 | 11 | 12 | 22 | 19 | 20 | 6 | 7 | 13 | 13 | **3** | 6 | 4 | Ret | 14 | Ret | 21 | 16 | 11 | 25 | 1750 |
| 14 | (Australia) Michael Caruso | 34 | 15 | 5 | 16 | 21 | 15 | Ret | 12 | 18 | 17 | 16 | 6 | 11 | 12 | 16 | 16 | 19 | 19 | 14 | 16 | 10 | 8 | 21 | 9 | 15 | 21 | 22 | 4 | 6 | 100 | 1729 |
| 15 | (Australia) Steven Johnson | 17 | 11 | 18 | 11 | 8 | 5 | 9 | 5 | 14 | 6 | 3 | 8 | 2 | 9 | 13 | 12 | 8 | 6 | 9 | 26 | Ret | Ret | 12 | 23 | 21 | 23 | Ret | 18 | 14 | 75 | 1708 |
| 16 | (Australia) Jason Bright | 8 | Ret | 2 | 4 | 23 | 19 | 11 | 6 | 1 | 2 | 7 | 1 | Ret | Ret | 9 | 22 | 21 | 14 | 28 | 7 | 5 | 21 | Ret | 25 | DNS | | | Ret | 9 | 25 | 1633 |
| 17 | (Australia) Steve Owen | 49 | 14 | 13 | Ret | DNS | 20 | 5 | 17 | Ret | DNS | 23 | 10 | 10 | 14 | 8 | 14 | 5 | 5 | 27 | 15 | 11 | 18 | 7 | 17 | 23 | 10 | 10 | Ret | 15 | 25 | 1561 |
| 18 | (Australia) Todd Kelly | 7 | 10 | Ret | 7 | Ret | 3 | 15 | 27 | 22 | 16 | 21 | Ret | 16 | Ret | 14 | 17 | 17 | Ret | 15 | 14 | 24 | 13 | 9 | 11 | 8 | 3 | 20 | 9 | 16 | 25 | 1550 |
| 19 | (Australia) David Reynolds | 16 | 17 | 4 | 22 | 14 | 24 | 20 | 19 | 20 | 24 | 22 | 20 | Ret | 21 | 24 | 23 | 18 | 18 | 5 | 6 | 19 | 19 | 11 | 22 | 22 | 18 | 13 | 13 | 13 | 0 | 1519 |
| 20 | (Australia) Russell Ingall | 39 | 24 | Ret | Ret | 16 | 14 | 8 | 14 | 12 | 19 | 17 | Ret | 23 | 5 | 10 | 9 | 16 | 12 | 11 | 20 | 8 | 22 | 8 | Ret | 17 | 14 | 23 | 17 | 5 | 75 | 1514 |
| 21 | (Australia) Jonathon Webb | 19 | 20 | 6 | 14 | 11 | Ret | 12 | 20 | 15 | 23 | 24 | 12 | 22 | 16 | 21 | Ret | 26 | 20 | 22 | 18 | 13 | 9 | 13 | 21 | 9 | 11 | 16 | Ret | 4 | 25 | 1493 |
| 22 | (Australia) Jason Bargwanna | 14 | 19 | 12 | 10 | Ret | 13 | Ret | 11 | 3 | 8 | Ret | 14 | 8 | 10 | 23 | 11 | 22 | 13 | 17 | 11 | 23 | 17 | 17 | 18 | 25 | Ret | 14 | Ret | 17 | 25 | 1352 |
| 23 | (Australia) James Moffat | 18 | 16 | Ret | Ret | 22 | 9 | 17 | 18 | 17 | 21 | 19 | 9 | 14 | 13 | 17 | 15 | 10 | 9 | 4 | 25 | 25 | 4 | Ret | 20 | 18 | Ret | 25 | 8 | Ret | 75 | 1306 |
| 24 | (Australia) Paul Dumbrell | 55 | 25 | 10 | 25 | 6 | DNS | 19 | Ret | 19 | 14 | 5 | 18 | 20 | 11 | 12 | 10 | 14 | 25 | 24 | 23 | Ret | 15 | Ret | 13 | **4** | 12 | Ret | Ret | Ret | 50 | 1242 |
| 25 | (Australia) Karl Reindler | 21 | Ret | 11 | 19 | 17 | 17 | 13 | 7 | Ret | DNS | 20 | 23 | Ret | 25 | 22 | 24 | 9 | 16 | 16 | 28 | 14 | Ret | 22 | 24 | 20 | 20 | 17 | 19 | 18 | 25 | 1144 |
| 26 | (Australia) Tony D'Alberto | 3 | 18 | Ret | 17 | 20 | 12 | Ret | 25 | 23 | 20 | 26 | 21 | 6 | 17 | 18 | 25 | 25 | 17 | 20 | | 9 | Ret | 19 | 15 | 16 | Ret | 18 | Ret | Ret | 25 | 1045 |
| 27 | (Australia) Dean Fiore | 12 | 22 | 20 | 15 | 15 | 21 | 14 | 24 | 21 | 22 | 25 | Ret | 17 | 19 | 20 | Ret | 23 | 21 | 25 | 19 | 20 | 20 | Ret | 19 | 24 | Ret | 19 | Ret | Ret | 0 | 992 |
| 28 | (Australia) Warren Luff | 30 | 23 | 17 | 21 | Ret | Ret | 16 | 26 | 25 | 25 | Ret | 22 | 24 | 23 | Ret | 21 | 27 | 24 | 23 | 27 | 15 | Ret | Ret | 26 | 28 | 22 | 24 | 15 | Ret | 25 | 809 |
| 29 | (Australia) Mark Skaife | 888 | | | | | | | | | | | | | | | | | | | 1 | 2 | | | | | | | | | 0 | 532 |
| 30 | (Australia) Nick Percat | 2 | | | | | | | | | | | | | | | | | | | 4 | 1 | | | | | | | | | 0 | 527 |
| 31 | (United Kingdom) Richard Lyons | 19/5 | | | | | | | | | | | | | | | | | | | 18 | 13 | 3 | 1 | | | | | | | 0 | 511 |
| 32 | (Denmark) Allan Simonsen | 11/14 | | | | | | | | | | | | | | | | | | | 13 | 3 | 17 | 17 | | | | | | | 0 | 509 |
| 33 | (Australia) Andrew Jones | 8 | | | | | | | | | | | | | | | | | | | 7 | 5 | | | | | 19 | 26 | | | 0 | 460 |
| 34 | (Australia) Cameron McConville | 1/8 | | | | | | | | | | | | | | | | | | | 9 | 7 | | | | 19 | | | | | 0 | 406 |
| 35 | (New Zealand) John McIntyre | 9 | | | | | | | | | | | | | | | | | | | 5 | 6 | | | | | | | | | 25 | 393 |
| 36 | (New Zealand) Steven Richards | 5 | | | | | | | | | | | | | | | | | | | 17 | 4 | | | | | | | | | 0 | 366 |
| 37 | (Australia) Luke Youlden | 6 | | | | | | | | | | | | | | | | | | | **3** | 18 | | | | | | | | | 0 | 344 |
| 38 | (Australia) Andrew Thompson | 88 | | | | | | | | | | | | | | | | | | | 2 | 21 | | | | | | | | | 0 | 334 |
| 39 | (France) Sébastien Bourdais | 88 | | | | | | | | | | | | | | | | | | | | | 1 | 2 | | | | | | | 0 | 288 |
| 39 | (Australia) Tim Blanchard | 16 | | | | | | | | | | | | | | | | | | | 6 | 19 | | | | | | | | | 0 | 288 |
| 41 | (Australia) Paul Morris | 49 | | | | | | | | | | | | | | | | | | | 15 | 11 | | | | | | | | | 0 | 268 |
| 42 | (Australia) Jack Perkins | 39 | | | | | | | | | | | | | | | | | | | 20 | 8 | | | | | | | | | 25 | 255 |
| 43 | (Australia) Greg Ritter | 33 | | | | | | | | | | | | | | | | | | | 12 | 17 | | | | | | | | | 0 | 243 |
| 44 | (Australia) Dale Wood | 3 | | | | | | | | | | | | | | | | | | | 21 | 9 | | | | | | | | | 25 | 236 |
| 45 | (Australia) Marcus Marshall | 34 | | | | | | | | | | | | | | | | | | | 16 | 10 | | | | | | | | | 50 | 229 |
| 46 | (United Kingdom) Oliver Gavin | 11 | | | | | | | | | | | | | | | | | | | | | 6 | 4 | | | | | | | 0 | 222 |
| 47 | (Australia) Owen Kelly | 15 | | | | | | | | | | | | | | | | | | | 8 | 22 | | | | | | | | | 25 | 220 |
| 48 | (New Zealand) Daniel Gaunt | 47 | | | | | | | | | | | | | | | | | | | 24 | 12 | | | | | | | | | 0 | 219 |
| 49 | (France) Simon Pagenaud | 33 | | | | | | | | | | | | | | | | | | | | | 10 | 3 | | | | | | | 0 | 207 |
| 49 | (Germany) Jörg Bergmeister | 15 | | | | | | | | | | | | | | | | | | | | | 7 | 5 | | | | | | | 0 | 207 |
| 51 | (Australia) David Russell | 7 | | | | | | | | | | | | | | | | | | | 14 | 25 | | | | | | | | | 0 | 202 |
| 52 | (Finland) Mika Salo | 6 | | | | | | | | | | | | | | | | | | | | | 2 | 14 | | | | | | | 0 | 201 |
| 53 | (Australia) Shane Price | 14 | | | | | | | | | | | | | | | | | | | 11 | 23 | | | | | | | | | 0 | 197 |
| 54 | (Australia) David Brabham | 4 | | | | | | | | | | | | | | | | | | | 22 | 16 | | | | | | | | | 0 | 193 |
| 55 | (Australia) Nathan Pretty | 30 | | | | | | | | | | | | | | | | | | | 27 | 15 | | | | | | | | | 0 | 192 |
| 56 | (Australia) Michael Patrizi | 12 | | | | | | | | | | | | | | | | | | | 19 | 20 | | | | | | | | | 0 | 187 |
| 57 | (Australia) David Wall | 21 | | | | | | | | | | | | | | | | | | | 28 | 14 | | | | | | | | | 0 | 185 |
| 58 | (United States) Patrick Long | 61 | | | | | | | | | | | | | | | | | | | | | 5 | 15 | | | | | | | 0 | 171 |
| 59 | (United Kingdom) Darren Turner | 1 | | | | | | | | | | | | | | | | | | | | | 14 | 6 | | | | | | | 0 | 165 |
| 60 | (Brazil) Gil de Ferran | 19 | | | | | | | | | | | | | | | | | | | | | 9 | 13 | | | | | | | 0 | 150 |
| 60 | (United Kingdom) Richard Westbrook | 7 | | | | | | | | | | | | | | | | | | | | | 13 | 9 | | | | | | | 0 | 150 |
| 62 | (New Zealand) Craig Baird | 61 | | | | | | | | | | | | | | | | | | | 10 | Ret | | | | | | | | | 0 | 148 |
| 63 | (United States) Boris Said | 49 | | | | | | | | | | | | | | | | | | | | | 18 | 7 | | | | | | | 0 | 147 |
| 63 | (Brazil) Hélio Castroneves | 47 | | | | | | | | | | | | | | | | | | | | | 12 | 10 | | | | | | | 0 | 147 |
| 65 | (New Zealand) Matt Halliday | 18 | | | | | | | | | | | | | | | | | | | 25 | 25 | | | | | | | | | 0 | 137 |
| 66 | (Brazil) Augusto Farfus | 34 | | | | | | | | | | | | | | | | | | | | | 8 | 21 | | | | | | | 0 | 132 |
| 67 | (Denmark) Jan Magnussen | 39 | | | | | | | | | | | | | | | | | | | | | 22 | 8 | | | | | | | 0 | 129 |
| 68 | (United States) Joey Hand | 18 | | | | | | | | | | | | | | | | | | | | | 4 | Ret | | | | | | | 0 | 120 |
| 68 | (Canada) Alex Tagliani | 16 | | | | | | | | | | | | | | | | | | | | | 19 | 11 | | | | | | | 0 | 120 |
| 70 | (Italy) Emanuele Pirro | 9 | | | | | | | | | | | | | | | | | | | | | 16 | 16 | | | | | | | 0 | 114 |
| 71 | (Australia) Dean Canto | 55 | | | | | | | | | | | | | | | | | | | 23 | Ret | | | | | | | | | 0 | 109 |
| 72 | (Australia) Ryan Briscoe | 2 | | | | | | | | | | | | | | | | | | | | | 11 | 23 | | | | | | | 0 | 108 |
| 73 | (Australia) Taz Douglas | 3 | | | | | | | | | | | | | | | | | | | 21 | | | | | | | | | | 0 | 93 |
| 74 | (Germany) Marc Lieb | 4 | | | | | | | | | | | | | | | | | | | | | 23 | 18 | | | | | | | 0 | 87 |
| 75 | (Germany) Dirk Müller | 17 | | | | | | | | | | | | | | | | | | | | | Ret | 12 | | | | | | | 0 | 69 |
| 76 | (Australia) David Besnard | 17 | | | | | | | | | | | | | | | | | | | 26 | Ret | | | | | | | | | 0 | 66 |
| 77 | (Austria) Christian Klien | 55 | | | | | | | | | | | | | | | | | | | | | 15 | Ret | | | | | | | 0 | 60 |
| 78 | (Italy) Vitantonio Liuzzi | 3 | | | | | | | | | | | | | | | | | | | | | Ret | 19 | | | | | | | 0 | 48 |
| 79 | (Italy) Gianni Morbidelli | 12 | | | | | | | | | | | | | | | | | | | | | 20 | Ret | | | | | | | 0 | 45 |
| 79 | (United Kingdom) Andy Priaulx | 888 | | | | | | | | | | | | | | | | | | | | | Ret | 20 | | | | | | | 0 | 45 |
| 81 | (France) Stéphane Sarrazin | 8 | | | | | | | | | | | | | | | | | | | | | 21 | Ret | | | | | | | 0 | 42 |
| 82 | (Italy) Fabrizio Giovanardi | 21 | | | | | | | | | | | | | | | | | | | | | Ret | 22 | | | | | | | 0 | 39 |
| | (Australia) Grant Denyer | 77 | | | | | | | | | | | | | | | | | | | | Ret | | | | | | | | | 0 | 0 |
| | (Australia) Cam Waters | 77 | | | | | | | | | | | | | | | | | | | | Ret | | | | | | | | | 0 | 0 |
| | (United Kingdom) Marino Franchitti | 30 | | | | | | | | | | | | | | | | | | | | | Ret | Ret | | | | | | | 0 | 0 |
| Pos. | Driver | No. | YMC (United Arab Emirates) | | ADE (South Australia) | | HAM (New Zealand) | | BAR (Western Australia) | | | WIN (Victoria (state)) | | HID (Northern Territory) | | TOW (Queensland) | | QLD (Queensland) | | | PHI (Victoria (state)) | BAT (New South Wales) | SUR (Queensland) | | SYM (Tasmania) | | SAN (Victoria (state)) | | SYD (New South Wales) | | Pen. | Pts. |

| Colour | Result |
|---|---|
| Gold | Winner |
| Silver | Second place |
| Bronze | Third place |
| Green | Points classification |
| Blue | Non-points classification |
| Blue | Non-classified finish (NC) |
| Purple | Retired, not classified (Ret) |
| Red | Did not qualify (DNQ) |
| Red | Did not pre-qualify (DNPQ) |
| Black | Disqualified (DSQ) |
| White | Did not start (DNS) |
| White | Withdrew (WD) |
| White | Race cancelled (C) |
| Blank | Did not practice (DNP) |
| Blank | Did not arrive (DNA) |
| Blank | Excluded (EX) |

Bold - Pole position
Italics - Fastest lap

=== Teams' championship ===
| Pos. | Team | No. | YMC (United Arab Emirates) | | ADE (South Australia) | | HAM (New Zealand) | | BAR (Western Australia) | | | WIN (Victoria (state)) | | HID (Northern Territory) | | TOW (Queensland) | | QLD (Queensland) | | | PHI (Victoria (state)) | BAT (New South Wales) | SUR (Queensland) | | SYM (Tasmania) | | SAN (Victoria (state)) | | SYD (New South Wales) | | Pen. | Pts. |
|---|---|---|---|---|---|---|---|---|---|---|---|---|---|---|---|---|---|---|---|---|---|---|---|---|---|---|---|---|---|---|---|---|
| 1 | Triple Eight Race Engineering | 88 | 1 | **3** | 2 | 1 | **23** | 18 | **1** | **2** | **1** | 1 | 2 | 9 | 6 | 2 | 1 | 3 | 2 | 10 | 2 | 21 | **1** | **2** | **1** | 1 | 13 | **1** | 20 | 8 | 0 | 6326 |
| 1 | Triple Eight Race Engineering | 888 | **7** | 21 | 3 | 12 | 2 | 10 | 2 | 4 | 4 | **11** | 7 | 3 | 2 | 4 | **2** | **1** | **1** | **1** | 1 | 2 | Ret | 20 | 2 | 5 | 6 | 4 | 1 | 2 | 0 | 6326 |
| 2 | Ford Performance Racing | 5 | 3 | 14 | 6 | 3 | 4 | Ret | 8 | 13 | 26 | 9 | **19** | **15** | **3** | **5** | 3 | 13 | 10 | 19 | 17 | 4 | 3 | 1 | 4 | 3 | 7 | 2 | 5 | 1 | 0 | 5080 |
| 2 | Ford Performance Racing | 6 | 12 | 16 | 9 | **7** | 6 | 4 | 3 | 8 | 15 | 13 | 24 | 5 | 7 | 3 | 18 | 15 | 15 | 21 | **3** | 18 | 2 | 14 | 5 | 2 | 4 | 3 | **Ret** | **Ret** | 0 | 5080 |
| 3 | Stone Brothers Racing | 4 | 2 | 7 | 23 | 10 | 10 | 7 | 21 | 6 | 11 | 6 | 16 | 19 | 8 | 26 | 4 | 12 | 22 | 8 | 22 | 16 | 23 | 18 | 6 | 26 | 16 | 15 | 12 | Ret | 0 | 4597 |
| 3 | Stone Brothers Racing | 9 | 4 | 8 | 13 | 18 | 16 | 1 | 4 | 10 | 7 | 14 | 4 | 7 | 1 | 11 | 5 | 11 | 8 | 3 | 5 | 6 | 16 | 16 | 7 | 7 | 5 | 6 | 3 | 3 | 0 | 4597 |
| 4 | Holden Racing Team | 1 | 26 | 1 | 24 | 4 | 11 | Ret | 10 | 26 | 5 | 8 | 25 | 25 | 24 | Ret | 19 | 20 | Ret | 12 | 9 | 7 | 14 | 6 | 10 | 11 | 2 | 11 | 7 | 7 | 0 | 4518 |
| 4 | Holden Racing Team | 2 | 6 | Ret | **1** | 5 | 18 | 3 | 13 | 7 | 3 | 12 | 3 | 18 | 26 | 1 | 26 | 28 | 23 | 6 | 4 | 1 | 11 | 23 | 3 | 6 | 8 | 5 | 2 | 19 | 0 | 4518 |
| 5 | Jack Daniels Racing | 7 | 10 | Ret | 7 | Ret | 3 | 15 | 27 | 22 | 16 | 21 | Ret | 16 | Ret | 14 | 17 | 17 | Ret | 15 | 14 | 24 | 13 | 9 | 11 | 8 | 3 | 20 | 9 | 16 | 0 | 3958 |
| 5 | Jack Daniels Racing | 15 | 13 | 19 | 12 | 2 | 1 | **6** | 9 | 16 | 12 | 4 | 17 | 1 | 20 | 7 | 13 | 4 | 4 | 17 | 8 | 22 | 7 | 5 | 14 | 12 | **1** | 9 | 10 | 12 | 0 | 3958 |
| 6 | Garry Rogers Motorsport | 33 | 9 | 22 | 20 | Ret | 22 | 2 | 16 | 9 | 18 | 2 | 15 | 4 | 15 | 6 | 6 | 7 | 11 | 18 | 12 | 17 | 10 | 3 | 16 | 13 | 17 | 8 | 14 | Ret | 0 | 3799 |
| 6 | Garry Rogers Motorsport | 34 | 15 | 5 | 16 | 21 | 15 | Ret | 12 | 18 | 17 | 16 | 6 | 11 | 12 | 16 | 16 | 19 | 19 | 14 | 16 | 10 | 8 | 21 | 9 | 15 | 21 | 22 | 4 | 6 | 0 | 3799 |
| 7 | Kelly Racing | 11 | 21 | 9 | 18 | 19 | 8 | Ret | 15 | 24 | 10 | 18 | 11 | 12 | 22 | 19 | 20 | 6 | 7 | 13 | 13 | **3** | 6 | 4 | Ret | 14 | Ret | 21 | 16 | 11 | 0 | 3295 |
| 7 | Kelly Racing | 16 | 17 | 4 | 22 | 14 | 24 | 20 | 19 | 20 | 24 | 22 | 20 | Ret | 21 | 24 | 23 | 18 | 18 | 5 | 6 | 19 | 19 | 11 | 22 | 22 | 18 | 13 | 13 | 13 | 0 | 3295 |
| 8 | Paul Morris Motorsport | 39 | 24 | Ret | Ret | 16 | 14 | 8 | 14 | 12 | 19 | 17 | Ret | 23 | 5 | 10 | 9 | 16 | 12 | 11 | 20 | 8 | 22 | 8 | Ret | 17 | 14 | 23 | 17 | 5 | 0 | 3175 |
| 8 | Paul Morris Motorsport | 49 | 14 | 13 | Ret | DNS | 20 | 5 | 17 | Ret | DNS | 23 | 10 | 10 | 14 | 8 | 14 | 5 | 5 | 27 | 15 | 11 | 18 | 7 | 17 | 23 | 10 | 10 | Ret | 15 | 0 | 3175 |
| 9 | Dick Johnson Racing | 17 | 11 | 18 | 11 | 8 | 5 | 9 | 5 | 14 | 6 | 3 | 8 | 2 | 9 | 13 | 12 | 8 | 6 | 9 | 26 | Ret | Ret | 12 | 23 | 21 | 23 | Ret | 18 | 14 | 0 | 3164 |
| 9 | Dick Johnson Racing | 18 | 16 | Ret | Ret | 22 | 9 | 17 | 18 | 17 | 21 | 19 | 9 | 14 | 13 | 17 | 15 | 10 | 9 | 4 | 25 | 25 | 4 | Ret | 20 | 18 | Ret | 25 | 8 | Ret | 0 | 3164 |
| 10 | Brad Jones Racing | 8 | Ret | 2 | 4 | 23 | 19 | 11 | 6 | 1 | 2 | 7 | 1 | Ret | Ret | 9 | 22 | 21 | 14 | 28 | 7 | 5 | 21 | Ret | 25 | 19 | 19 | 26 | Ret | 9 | 0 | 3158 |
| 10 | Brad Jones Racing | 14 | 19 | 12 | 10 | Ret | 13 | Ret | 11 | 3 | 9 | Ret | 14 | 8 | 10 | 23 | 11 | 22 | 13 | 17 | 11 | 23 | 17 | 17 | 18 | 25 | Ret | 14 | Ret | 17 | 0 | 3158 |
| 11 | James Rosenberg Racing (s) | 47 | 5 | Ret | 8 | 13 | Ret | Ret | 22 | 5 | 9 | 15 | 13 | 21 | 4 | 25 | 7 | 2 | 3 | 2 | 24 | 12 | 12 | 10 | 12 | 27 | 15 | 7 | 6 | 10 | 0 | 1904 |
| 12 | Walkinshaw Racing (s) | 61 | 8 | 15 | 5 | 9 | 7 | Ret | 23 | 11 | 13 | 10 | 5 | 13 | 18 | 15 | 8 | 24 | 18 | 7 | 10 | Ret | 5 | 15 | 8 | 10 | 9 | 12 | 11 | Ret | 0 | 1864 |
| 13 | Tekno Autosports (s) | 19 | 20 | 6 | 14 | 11 | Ret | 12 | 20 | 15 | 23 | 24 | 12 | 22 | 16 | 21 | Ret | 26 | 20 | 22 | 18 | 13 | 9 | 13 | 21 | 9 | 11 | 16 | Ret | 4 | 0 | 1518 |
| 14 | Rod Nash Racing (s) | 55 | 25 | 10 | 25 | 6 | DNS | 19 | Ret | 19 | 14 | 5 | 18 | 20 | 11 | 12 | 10 | 14 | 25 | 24 | 23 | Ret | 15 | Ret | 13 | **4** | 12 | Ret | Ret | Ret | 0 | 1292 |
| 15 | Britek Motorsport (s) | 21 | Ret | 11 | 19 | 17 | 17 | 13 | 7 | Ret | DNS | 20 | 23 | Ret | 25 | 22 | 24 | 9 | 16 | 16 | 28 | 14 | Ret | 22 | 24 | 20 | 20 | 17 | 19 | 18 | 0 | 1169 |
| 16 | Tony D'Alberto Racing (s) | 3 | 18 | Ret | 17 | 20 | 12 | Ret | 25 | 23 | 20 | 26 | 21 | 6 | 17 | 18 | 25 | 25 | 17 | 20 | 21 | 9 | Ret | 19 | 15 | 16 | Ret | 18 | Ret | Ret | 0 | 1163 |
| 17 | Triple F Racing (s) | 12 | 22 | 20 | 15 | 15 | 21 | 14 | 24 | 21 | 22 | 25 | Ret | 17 | 19 | 20 | Ret | 23 | 21 | 25 | 19 | 20 | 20 | Ret | 19 | 24 | Ret | 19 | Ret | Ret | 0 | 992 |
| 18 | Lucas Dumbrell Motorsport (s) | 30 | 23 | 17 | 21 | Ret | Ret | 16 | 26 | 25 | 25 | Ret | 22 | 24 | 23 | Ret | 21 | 27 | 24 | 23 | 27 | 15 | Ret | Ret | 26 | 28 | 22 | 24 | 15 | Ret | 0 | 834 |
| Pos. | Team | No. | YMC (United Arab Emirates) | | ADE (South Australia) | | HAM (New Zealand) | | BAR (Western Australia) | | | WIN (Victoria (state)) | | HID (Northern Territory) | | TOW (Queensland) | | QLD (Queensland) | | | PHI (Victoria (state)) | BAT (New South Wales) | SUR (Queensland) | | SYM (Tasmania) | | SAN (Victoria (state)) | | SYD (New South Wales) | | Pen. | Pts. |

| Colour | Result |
|---|---|
| Gold | Winner |
| Silver | Second place |
| Bronze | Third place |
| Green | Points classification |
| Blue | Non-points classification |
| Blue | Non-classified finish (NC) |
| Purple | Retired, not classified (Ret) |
| Red | Did not qualify (DNQ) |
| Red | Did not pre-qualify (DNPQ) |
| Black | Disqualified (DSQ) |
| White | Did not start (DNS) |
| White | Withdrew (WD) |
| White | Race cancelled (C) |
| Blank | Did not practice (DNP) |
| Blank | Did not arrive (DNA) |
| Blank | Excluded (EX) |

Bold - Pole position
Italics - Fastest lap

- (s) denotes a single-car team.

== See also ==
- 2011 V8 Supercar season
