= 1976 Rover 500K =

Endurance race for Group C Touring Cars

The 1976 Rover 500K was an endurance race for Group C Touring Cars. The race was held at the Phillip Island Grand Prix Circuit in Victoria, Australia on 28 November 1976 over 106 laps, totalling 501.4 kilometres. The Rover 500K was Round 4 of the 1976 Australian Championship of Makes and Round 11 of the 1976 Australian Touring Car Championship. It was the sixth "Phillip Island 500K" race to be held.

The race was notable for being Colin Bond's last drive for the Holden Dealer Team after more than seven years in their lineup. Bond won the race from Charlie O'Brien, the driver who would replace him in 1977. In a generally poorly attended entry the pair finished four laps ahead of Peter Janson, providing a clean sweep of the podium positions for Holden Torana drivers.

== Class structure ==
Cars competed in four classes, defined by the engine capacity.

- Class A : Up to 1300cc
- Class B : 1301–2000cc
- Class C : 2001 – 3000cc
- Class D : Over 3000cc

== Results ==
Results were as follows:

Position	Drivers	No.	Car	Entrant	Laps
1	Colin Bond	1	Holden LH Torana SL/R 5000 L34	Marlboro Holden Dealer Team	106
2	Charlie O'Brien	8	Holden LH Torana SL/R 5000 L34	Tweed Motors	106
3	Peter Janson	20	Holden LH Torana SL/R 5000 L34	Captain Peter Janson	102
4	Garth Wigston		Holden LH Torana SL/R 5000 L34	Roadways Racing	102
5	Allan Grice	25	Mazda RX-3	Craven Mild Racing	101
6	Lou Stoopman; Martin Power		Holden LJ Torana GTR XU-1		95
7	John Pollard		Holden LH Torana SL/R 5000 L34		95
8	David Langman; Bernie McClure		Holden LH Torana SL/R 5000 L34		95
9	Frank Porter	60	Alfa Romeo Alfetta GT	Clemens Motors	94
10	Bob Nissen		Ford Capri V6		93
11	Geoff Newton		Ford Capri V6		93
12	Chris Heyer		Volkswagen Golf		92
13	Roger Bonhomme		Honda Civic		92
14	Ray Farrar; John Millard		Ford Escort GT 1300		89
15	Tony Niovanni		Holden Gemini SL		87
16	Max McGinley	65	Honda Civic RS		86
17	Bronwyn Taylor; Frank Brewster		Honda Civic		82
18	Kel Gough; Alan Gough		Holden LH Torana SL/R 5000 L34		78
19	Geoff Wade		Ford Escort 1300 MkII		75
20	Granton Harrison; Warwick Henderson		Alfa Romeo GTV		67
Class A : Up to 1,300 cc
1	Roger Bonhomme		Honda Civic		92
2	Ray Farrar; John Millard		Ford Escort GT		89
3	Max McGinley		Honda Civic		86
4	Bronwyn Taylor; Frank Brewster		Honda Civic		82
5	Geoff Wade		Ford Escort 1300		75
Class B : 1,301 to 2,000 cc
1	Frank Porter		Alfa Romeo Alfetta GT	Clemens Motors	94
2	Chris Heyer		Volkswagen Golf		92
3	Tony Niovanni		Holden Gemini SL		87
4	Graham Harrison; Warwick Henderson		Alfa Romeo GTV		67
Class C : 2,001 to 3,000 cc
1	Allan Grice		Mazda RX-3	Craven Mild Racing	101
2	Bob Nissen		Ford Capri V6		93
3	Geoff Newton		Ford Capri V6		93
Class D : Over 3,000 cc
1	Colin Bond	1	Holden LH Torana SL/R 5000 L34	Marlboro Holden Dealer Team	106
2	Charlie O'Brien	8	Holden LH Torana SL/R 5000 L34	Tweed Motors	106
3	Peter Janson		Holden LH Torana SL/R 5000 L34	Peter Janson	102
4	Garth Wigston		Holden LH Torana SL/R 5000 L34	Roadways Racing	102
5	Lou Stoopman; Martin Power		Holden LJ Torana GTR XU-1		95
6	John Pollard		Holden LH Torana SL/R 5000 L34		95
7	David Langman; Bernie McClure		Holden LH Torana SL/R 5000 L34		95
Retirements
DNF	Bill Evans		Datsun 1200		
DNF	Jim Murcott		Ford Escort RS2000 "MkI"		
DNF	Peter Brock	5	Holden LH Torana SL/R 5000 L34	Team Brock	
DNF	Terry Wade		Triumph Dolomite Sprint		
DNF	John Harvey	2	Holden LH Torana SL/R 5000 L34	Marlboro-Holden Dealer Team	
DNF	Murray Carter		Ford XB Falcon GT Hardtop	Brian Wood Ford	
DNF	Jim Stewart		Morris Mini Clubman GT		
DNF	Jim Keogh		Ford XB Falcon GT Hardtop		
DNF	Geoff Moran		Ford Capri V6		
DNF	Bob Morris		Triumph Dolomite Sprint	Ron Hodgson Motors	
DNF	Lawrie Nelson		Ford Capri V6	Capri Components	
DNF	Wayne Mitchell		Holden LH Torana SL/R 5000 L34		
DNF	James Laing-Peach		Triumph Dolomite Sprint		

Note: The event was contested by a 43 car field.
