= 1972 Phillip Island 500K =

The 1972 Phillip Island 500K was an endurance motor race open to Group E Series Production Touring Cars. The event, which was Heat 4 of the 1972 Australian Manufacturers' Championship, was held on 21 October 1972 at the Phillip Island circuit in Victoria, Australia over a distance of 318 miles (512 km). It was organised by the Phillip Island Auto Racing Club.

The race was won by Allan Moffat driving a Ford XY Falcon GTHO Phase III.

== Class Structure ==
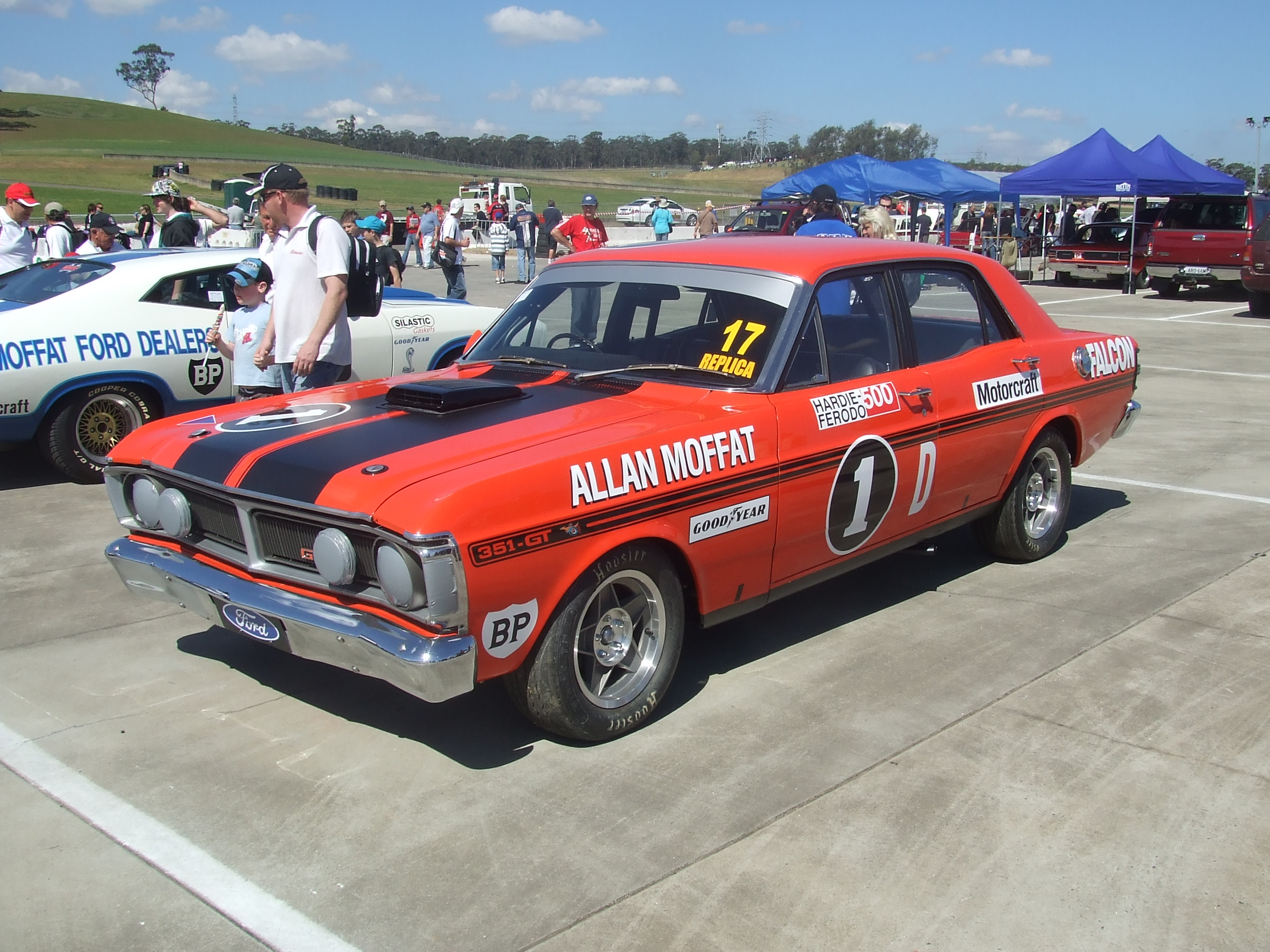
A replica of the Ford Falcon GTHO with which Allan Moffat won the race.

As a heat of the 1972 Australian Manufacturers' Championship, the race featured four classes defined by "Capacity Price Units". The C.P. Unit value for each car was assessed by multiplying the engine capacity (in litres) by the Sydney retail price (in Australian dollars).

- Class A : Up to 3,000 C.P. Units
- Class B : 3,001 to 9,000 C.P. Units
- Class C : 9,001 to 18,000 C.P. Units
- Class D : 18,000 C.P. Units and over

== Results ==
Position	Drivers	No.	Car	Entrant	Class	Class pos.	Laps
1	Allan Moffat	1	Ford XY Falcon GTHO Phase III	Ford Motor Co. of Australia	D	1	106
2	Peter Brock	28	Holden LJ Torana GTR XU-1	Holden Dealer Team	C	1	106
3	Fred Gibson	8	Ford XY Falcon GTHO Phase III	Ford Motor Co. of Australia	D	2	104
4	Graeme Blanchard	29	Holden Torana GTR XU-1	Blanchard Motors	C	2	102
5	Colin Bond	24	Holden Torana GTR XU-1	Holden Dealer Team	C	3	102
6	Tom Naughton	4	Chrysler VH Valiant Charger	Eastside Chrysler	D	3	102
7	Murray Carter	3	Ford XY Falcon GTHO Phase III	M. Carter	D	4	101
8	Tony Niovanni	35	Holden Torana GTR XU-1	Peter Robinson Motors	C	4	100
9	John Stoopman	26	Holden Torana GTR XU-1	J. Stoopman	C	5	99
10	Bill Gates	51	Ford Escort Twin Cam	Morley Ford	B	1	98
11	Lakis Manticas	38	Ford Escort GT	Slideaway Car Roofs P/L	B	2	98
12	Jim Murcott	40	Ford Escort GT	Brian Wood Ford	B	3	98
13	Wayne Rogerson	37	Mazda Capella	Mazda Dealer Team	B	4	96
14	Ray Harrison	25	Alfa Romeo 1750 GTV	A. F. & M. Beninca P/L	C	6	96
15	John Piper	39	Ford Escort Twin Cam	Evans Motor Service	B	5	96
16	George Garth	49	Mazda Capella	Mazda Dealer Team	B	6	93
17	Geoff Perry	67	Mazda 1300	Bainbridge Motors	A	1	90
18	Mel Mollison	64	Mazda 1300	Bainbridge Motors	A	2	90
19	Fred Sutherland, Gary Keen	74	Mazda 1300	Victorian Police Motor Sport Club	A	3	88
20	Allan Keith	42	Ford Escort Twin Cam	A. R. Keith	B	7	87
21	Doug Whiteford	68	Datsun 1200	Datsun Racing Team	A	4	84
22	Gary Parnaby	44	Datsun 1600	G. A. Parnaby	B	8	79
NC	Roxburgh, Jon Leighton	63	Datsun 1200	Datsun Racing Team	A		
?	Bill Evans	73	Datsun 1200	Datsun Racing Team	A		
DNF	Lawrie Nelson	14	Chrysler VH Valiant Charger	Tony Roberts Auto. Centre	D		
DNF	Des West	7	Ford XY Falcon GTHO Phase III	Goldpower Automotive P/L	D		36
DNS	Brian Ovenden	5	Chrysler VH Valiant Charger	Les Foster Tyres, Moorabbin	D		

== Notes ==
- Fastest lap: Allan Moffat, 2m 5s, 84.6 m.p.h., lap record
- Race time of winning car: 3h 48m 29.7s
- Winning margin: 25.9s
