= GTV =

GTV may refer to:

== Media ==
- GTV (Africa), a former subscription television operator
- GTV (Australia), the Melbourne television station of Australia's Nine Network
- GTV (Bangladesh), Bengali language digital cable television channel
- GTV, the former name of bTV Comedy a cable television channel in Bulgaria
- GTV (Ghana), the national television broadcaster in Ghana
- GTV (Indonesian TV network), a national television network in Indonesia
- GTV (Israeli TV channel), an Israeli television channel
- GTV Network (Pakistan), a national television network in Pakistan.
- GTV (Philippine TV network), a Philippine television network
- GTV Media Group, a media company founded by Steve Bannon and Guo Wengui
- Gala Television, a cable television network in Taiwan
- Gateway Television, an African television network
- Gazi Television, a Bengali language digital cable television channel
- Global Tamil Vision, a Tamil language satellite TV channel broadcasting internationally
- Government Television, now People's Television Network, a Philippine television network
- GoyimTV, a neo-Nazi website ran by the Goyim Defense League.
- Gunma Television, a Japanese television station in Gunma Prefecture
- Guild TV, a student television station based in Birmingham, United Kingdom

== Other uses ==
- Aerogaviota, a Cuban airline
- Alfa Romeo GTV (disambiguation), multiple coupé car
- Alfa Romeo Sprint GT (Veloce), a car from Alfa Romeo
- GoyimTV, a video channel of the Goyim Defense League
