= 1975 Phillip Island 500K =

The 1975 Phillip Island 500K was an endurance race for Touring Cars complying with CAMS Group C regulations. The event was held at the Phillip Island circuit in Victoria, Australia on 23 November 1975. Race distance was 106 laps of the 4.73 km circuit for a race distance of 501 km.

There were 48 starters in the event, which event was the fifth and final round of the 1975 Australian Manufacturers' Championship.

The race was won by Peter Brock driving for the Gown-Hindhaugh team continuing a run of good results since Brock had left the Holden Dealer Team the previous year. Brock took a four lap win over fellow Holden Torana racer Allan Grice. Attrition bit heavily into a field low on strength in the faster cars that competed at other Australian Manufacturers' Championship events, to the point that a well driven race by the Ford Escort RS2000 of Jim Murcott and Rod Stevens brought them third place, five laps behind Brock.

== Class structure ==
The field was divided into four engine capacity classes:

- Class A: Up to 1300cc
- Class B: 1301–2000cc
- Class C: 2001 – 3000cc
- Class D: 3001 – 6000cc

== Results ==
| Position | Drivers | No. | Car | Entrant | Class | Laps |
|---|---|---|---|---|---|---|
| 1 | Peter Brock | 5 | Holden LH Torana SLR5000 L34 | Gown – Hindhaugh | D | 106 |
| 2 | Allan Grice | | Holden LH Torana SLR5000 L34 | | D | 102 |
| 3 | Jim Murcott; Rod Stevens | 41 | Ford Escort RS2000 | | B | 101 |
| 4 | Kelvin Gough | 10 | Holden LH Torana SLR5000 L34 | | D | 100 |
| 5 | Fred Gibson | | Alfa Romeo 2000 GTV | | B | 98 |
| 6 | Gary Cooke; Neil Mason | | Mazda RX-3 | | B | 98 |
| 7 | Lawrie Nelson | 13 | Ford Capri GT3000 | | C | 98 |
| 8 | John Goss | | Ford XB Falcon GT | | D | 97 |
| 9 | Craig Bradtke | | Mazda RX-3 | | C | 97 |
| 10 | Bill Evans | | Datsun 1200 | | A | 96 |
| 11 | Graeme Blanchard | | Holden LH Torana SLR5000 L34 | | D | 96 |
| 12 | Rod McRae | | Holden LH Torana SLR5000 L34 | | D | 95 |
| 13 | Cam Richardson | | Holden LJ Torana GTR XU-1 | | D | 95 |
| 14 | Phil George | | Datsun 240K | | C | 93 |
| 15 | Bob Nissen | | Ford Capri V6 | | C | 91 |
| 16 | Max de Jersey; Neil West | | Honda Civic | | A | 90 |
| 17 | Robin Dudfield | | Alfa Romeo GT Junior | | A | 90 |
| 18 | Caroline O'Shanesy | | Morris Cooper S | | A | 88 |
| 19 | Ray Molloy | | Morris Clubman GT | | A | 83 |
| 20 | Alan Broome; Frank Brewster | | Alfa Romeo GT Junior | | A | 83 |
| 21 | B Derrick | | Ford Escort GT | | A | |
Other starters included the following
| ? | B Porter; J Ainsley | 54 | Mazda 1300 | | A | |
| ? | Colin Campbell | | Ford Escort RS2000 | | B | |
| ? | Ken Harrison | | Ford Escort GT | | A | |
| ? | Max McGinley | 51 | Honda Civic | | A | |
| ? | Ross Wemyss | | Mercedes-Benz 280E | | | |
| ? | V Evans | | Ford Escort GT | | A | |
| DNF | Colin Bond | | Holden LH Torana SLR5000 L34 | Marlboro Holden Dealer Team | D | |
| DNF | Frank Porter | | Alfa Romeo 2000 GTV | Beninca | | |
| DNF | Geoff Wade | | Ford Escort GT | | A | |
| DNF | Jim Keogh | | Ford XB Falcon GT | | D | |
| DNF | John Pollard | | Holden LH Torana SLR5000 L34 | | D | |
| DNF | John Stoopman | | Holden LH Torana SLR5000 L34 | | D | |
| DNF | Murray Carter | | Ford XB Falcon GT | | D | |
| DNF | Paul Benasconi | | Alfa Romeo 2000 GTV | Alfa Romeo Dealer Team | | |
| DNF | Peter Janson | | Holden LH Torana SLR5000 L34 | | D | |
| DNF | Stuart Saker | | Holden Torana GTR XU-1 | | D | |
| DNF | Warren Cullen | | Holden LH Torana SLR5000 L34 | | D | |
