= 1976 Hang Ten 400 =

The 1976 Hang Ten 400 was an endurance race for Group C Touring Cars. The event was staged at the Sandown circuit in Victoria, Australia on 12 September 1976 over 130 laps of the 3.11 km circuit, a total of 403.8 km. The event was Round 8 of the 1976 Australian Touring Car Championship and Round 1 of the 1976 Australian Championship of Makes. It was the eleventh running of the endurance race which would later become known as the Sandown 500.

The race was won by Peter Brock driving a Holden Torana.

== Classes ==
Cars competed in four classes:

- Class A: Up to 1300 cc
- Class B: 1301 to 2000 cc
- Class C: 2001 to 3000 cc
- Class D: 3001 cc and over

== Results ==
Position	Drivers	No.	Car	Entrant	Class	Class Pos.	Laps
1	Peter Brock, Phillip Brock	5	Holden Torana LH SL/R 5000 L34	Team Brock	D	1	130
2	Allan Moffat	9	Ford Falcon XB GT Hardtop	Moffat Ford Dealers	D	2	128
3	Graeme Blanchard	16	Holden Torana LH SL/R 5000 L34	Insul Fluf Home Insulation	D	3	128
4	Charlie O'Brien	8	Holden Torana LH SL/R 5000 L34	O'Brien's Transport Shell Sport	D	4	128
5	Murray Carter	18	Ford Falcon XB GT Hardtop	M. Carter	D	5	128
6	Barry Seton	26	Ford Capri 3000 GT	B. Benson	C	1	122
7	Lakis Manticas, Doug Chivas	27	Ford Capri 3000 GT	L. Manticas	C	2	122
8	Lawrie Nelson, Barrie Nelson	32	Ford Capri 3000 GT	H. M. Headers	C	3	121
9	Graham Moore, Dick Johnson	28	Ford Capri 3000 GT	Bryan Byrt Ford, Qld.	C	4	120
10	Tony Wilkinson, Wayne Negus	21	Holden Torana LH SL/R 5000 L34	Karquip	D	6	120
11	Don Holland, Lyn Brown	23	Mazda RX-3	Penrith Mazda Centre	C	5	119
12	Ron Dickson, Dick Johnson	39	Triumph Dolomite Sprint	Ron Hodgson Motors	B	1	119
13	Frank Porter	60	Alfa Romeo Alfetta GT	Clemens Sporting Car Serv.	B	2	118
14	James Laing-Peach, Paul Gulson	38	Triumph Dolomite Sprint	Endrust Australia	B	3	118
15	John Pollard	22	Holden Torana LH SL/R 5000 L34	Garry & Warren Smith	D	7	118
16	Christine Gibson, Fred Gibson	58	Alfa Romeo 2000 GTV	Brian Foley P/L	B	4	117
17	Chris Heyer, Peter Lander	53	Volkswagen Golf GTi	Lennox Motors	B	5	116
18	Bill Evans	71	Datsun 1200 Coupe	John Roxburgh Motors	A	1	112
19	David Seldon	36	Triumph Dolomite Sprint	Orange City Leyland	B	6	111
20	Roger Bonhomme	62	Honda Civic	Mollison Motors	A	2	109
21	David Crowther	74	Alfa Romeo 1300 GT Junior	Fred's Treds Pty Ltd	A	3	108
22	Robin Dudfield, Tony Niovanni	73	Alfa Romeo 1300 GT Junior	Avanti Motors-Alfa	A	4	108
23	Ray Molloy, Allan Braszell	76	Morris Clubman GT	Ray Molloy Motors	A	5	107
24	Brian Reed, Ian Chilman	64	Honda Civic	I. Chilman	A	6	106
25	Bob Forbes, Russ McRae	14	Holden Torana LH SL/R 5000 L34	Suttons Motors P/L	D	8	105
26	Tony Niovanni	42	Holden Gemini TX	Peter Robinson Holden	A	7	105
27	Max McGinley, John Lord	75	Honda Civic	M. F. McGinley	A	8	101
28	John English, Gary Scott	47	Ford Escort RS2000 Mk. 2	Peak Performance P/L	A	9	98
29	Geoff Wade, Colin Campbell	68	Ford Escort 1300	Peter Mac's Towing	A	10	89
NC	Peter Granger	56	BMW 2002 Tii	B. Glazier	B	-	86
NC	Kel Gough	10	Holden Torana LH SL/R 5000 L34		D	-	79
DNF	Colin Bond	1	Holden Torana LH SL/R 5000 L34	Marlboro Holden Dealer Team	D	-	111
DNF	Garth Wigston	20	Holden Torana LH SL/R 5000 L34	Roadways Pty Ltd	D	-	101
DNF	Lyndon Arnel, Peter Hopwood	45	Ford Escort RS2000 Mk. 2	Bob Holden Shell Sport	B	-	97
DNF	Allan Grice	12	Holden Torana LH SL/R 5000 L34	Craven Mild Racing	D	-	89
DNF	Bruce Hindhaugh	4	Holden Torana LH SL/R 5000 L34	Gown-Hindhaugh Engine Devel.	D	-	86
DNF	Bob Morris	7	Holden Torana LH SL/R 5000 L34	Ron Hodgson Motors	D	-	77
DNF	Greville Arnel, Greg Toepfer	67	Toyota Corolla	G. Arnel	A	-	76
DNF	Alan Cant, George Morrell	31	Ford Capri 3000 GT	A.T.P. (Aust) P/L	C	-	73
DNF	Ralph Radburn	57	BMW 2002 Tii	R. Radburn	B	-	63
DNF	Colin Campbell, Geoff Wade	33	Ford Escort RS2000 Mk. I	Allan Coffey Motors	B	-	63
DNF	Jim Murcott, Rod Stevens	49	Ford Escort RS2000 Mk. I	Brian Wood Ford	B	-	52
DNF	Warren Cullen, Max Stewart	6	Holden Torana LH SL/R 5000 L34	Settlement Road Wrecking	D	-	42
DNF	Bob Holden, Ray Cutchie	43	Ford Escort RS2000 Mk. 2	Bob Holden Shell Sport	B	-	40
DNF	Peter Janson, Kevin Bartlett	15	Holden Torana LH SL/R 5000 L34	Kellway-Egan	D	-	39
DNF	Bernie Stack, Keith Poole	70	Volkswagen Passat	Blackwood Cars P/L	A	-	37
DNF	John Goss, Jim Richards	2	Ford Falcon XB GT Hardtop	John Goss Racing P/L	D	-	33
DNF	Ray Harrison, Craig Bradtke	24	Mazda RX-3	Rotary Exchange	C	-	25
DNF	Paul Older, Barry Lake	34	BMW 3.0Si	Craven Mild Racing	C	-	25
DNF	Jim Keogh, Nick Louis	11	Ford Falcon XB GT Hardtop	Allan Coffey Motors	D	-	21
DNF	Brian Porter, Joihn Ainsley	65	Mazda 1300	James Mason Motors	C	-	20
DNF	Ken Harrison, David Turnbull	69	Ford Escort 1300	Ken Harrison Shell Sport	A	-	11
DNF	John Dellaca, Terry Wade	35	Triumph Dolomite Sprint	B & G Myers Leyland	B	-	7

Note: 53 cars are listed on the grid list published with the Hang Ten 400 race report in Racing Car News magazine.

Preceded by 1975 Sandown 250	Sandown 400; 1976	Succeeded by 1977 Hang Ten 400
