= DOSTv: Science for the People =

- Genre: Science and Technology; Program
- Country of origin: Philippines
- No. of episodes: 3,000+

Production
- Producers: Department of Science and Technology – Science and Technology Information; Institute
- Camera setup: Multi-camera setup

Original release
- Network: PTV (2017–2020); GNN (2016–2020)
- Release: May 30, 2016 – 2020
- Network: GTV (2025–present)
- Release: 2025 – present

Related
- Panahon.TV; GTV

DOSTv: Science for the People is the official science broadcast program and the Science and Technology (S&T) content creator of the Department of Science and Technology (DOST) managed by the Science and Technology Information Institute (STII) that produces and disseminates programs, knowledge products, and services on science, technology, and innovation (STI) for the benefit of the people.

The program is also made available through online streaming via its official website and social media platforms.

== History ==
DOSTv is the official multimedia broadcasting platform of the Department of Science and Technology – Science and Technology Information Institute (DOST-STII). It produces and distributes science, technology, and innovation-related programs through television, radio, digital platforms, and social media."About DOSTv". DOST-STII.

In May 2016, DOST-STII launched DOSTv: The Filipino Weather Channel as its official online broadcasting platform. The program initially aired through online streaming and social media platforms, providing science-based news and weather information to the public."DOSTv Launch Announcement". Department of Science and Technology.

On 27 February 2017, DOSTv was formally launched during the 30th anniversary celebration of DOST-STII.Manahan, Romelie Janelle (March 9, 2017). "DOSTv launched". The Philippine Star. The platform was subsequently rebranded as DOSTv: Science for the People and expanded its content to include science and technology news, feature stories, and public service information."DOSTv Overview". DOST-STII.

On 29 May 2017, DOSTv expanded to television through PTV, reaching a nationwide audience."DOSTv now on free TV". Department of Science and Technology.

In 2019, DOSTv expanded its programming with DOSTv sa Radyo on Radyo Pilipinas 1 and Siyensikat: Pinoy Popular Science Para sa Lahat."DOSTv Programs". DOST-STII.

During the COVID-19 pandemic in 2020, DOSTv shifted much of its production to digital platforms and introduced programs such as DOST Report, ExperTalk Online, and Bantay Bulkan, produced in partnership with PHIVOLCS."DOSTv COVID-19 Programming". DOST-STII.

In 2021, DOSTv launched Animagham, an animated science program for children. Siyensikat also returned to television broadcasts during this period."DOSTv Programs 2021–2022". DOST-STII.

In subsequent years, DOSTv continued to produce science communication programs across television, radio, and digital platforms, including ExperTalk and DOST Report."DOSTv Overview". DOST-STII.

== Segments ==
Some of the segments of the show are the following: weather, flood, dam, seismology and volcanology updates from PAGASA and PHILVOLCS, interviews with DOST officials and SciTech experts, exclusive coverages of DOST events, and other featured segments such as Balitang RapiDOST (DOST news updates); Sinesiyensya (SciTech documentaries); Global Science (SciTech world news); Sci-Facts (trivia) and Sustansyarap (DOST-FNRI cooking portion).

== Reception and impact ==
DOSTv has been recognized as part of the Philippine government's efforts to improve science communication and public understanding of science and technology. Its multi-platform distribution has been cited as contributing to broader accessibility of scientific information in the country."DOST strengthens science communication through media programs". Philippine Daily Inquirer.

== See also ==
- Panahon.TV
- GTV
