= 1975 Sandown 250 =

The 1975 Sandown 250 was an endurance race for Group C Touring Cars held at the Sandown circuit in Victoria, Australia on 14 September 1975. Race distance was 130 laps of the 3.11 km circuit, totalling 403.8 km (250.9 mi). It was the tenth running of the race which would become the "Sandown 500" and was Round 2 of the 1975 Australian Manufacturers' Championship.

The race was won by Peter Brock driving a Holden Torana LH SL/R 5000 L34.

== Classes ==
Car competed in four classes:

- 3001 c.c. and over
- 2001c.c. to 3000 c.c.
- 1301 c.c. to 2000 c.c.
- Up to 1300 c.c.

== Results ==
Position	Drivers	No.	Car	Entrant	Class	Class pos.	Laps
1	Peter Brock	05	Holden Torana LH SL/R 5000 L34	Gown-Hindhaugh Eng. Dev.	3001 c.c. and over	1	130
2	Bob Morris	11	Holden Torana LH SL/R 5000 L34	Ron Hodgson-Endrust Racing Team	3001 c.c. and over	2	130
3	John Pollard, Bryan Thomson	6	Holden Torana LH SL/R 5000 L34	Garry and Warren Smith	3001 c.c. and over	3	128
4	Rod McRae, Russ McRae	23	Holden Torana LH SL/R 5000 L34	Dustings of Burwood	3001 c.c. and over	4	128
5	John Stoopman	7	Holden Torana LJ GTR XU-1	J. Stoopman	3001 c.c. and over	5	125
6	Bernie McClure, Brian Reed	19	Holden Torana LH SL/R 5000 L34	Bendigo Motor Co.	3001 c.c. and over	6	121
7	Colin Bond	2	Holden Torana LH SL/R 5000 L34	Marlboro Holden Dealer Team	3001 c.c. and over	7	120
8	Nick Louis	30	Mazda RX-3	Mazda Dealers Victoria	2001c.c. to 3000 c.c	1	120
9	Craig Bradtke	34	Mazda RX-3	Rotary Rebuild	2001c.c. to 3000 c.c	2	120
10	Barry Seton	28	Ford Capri GT 3000	B. Benson	2001c.c. to 3000 c.c	3	119
11	Jim Murcott, Rod Stevens	41	Ford Escort RS2000	Brian Wood Ford	1301 c.c. to 2000 c.c.	1	119
12	Geoff Perry	32	Datsun 260Z 2+2	John Roxburgh Motors	2001c.c. to 3000 c.c	4	118
13	Bob Holden	43	Ford Escort RS2000	Bob Holden - Shell Racing	1301 c.c. to 2000 c.c.	2	116
14	Michael Stillwell, Geoff Brabham	36	Ford Escort RS2000	B. S. Stillwell Ford	1301 c.c. to 2000 c.c.	3	115
15	Don Holland	33	Mazda RX-3	Penrith Mazda Centre P/L	2001c.c. to 3000 c.c	5	113
16	Gary Cooke	47	Mazda RX-3	Dave Montgomery Motors	1301 c.c. to 2000 c.c.	4	113
17	Peter Lander	58	Morris Cooper S	P. Lander	Up to 1300 c.c.	1	113
18	Max McGinley	59	Honda Civic	Astoria Honda - Bentleigh	Up to 1300 c.c.	2	113
19	Ray Molloy	56	Morris Clubman GT	Ray Molloy Motors, Preston	Up to 1300 c.c.	3	112
20	Ross Wemyss	26	Mercedes-Benz 280E	Hobson White Motors P/L	2001c.c. to 3000 c.c	6	110
21	John Lord	54	Morris Cooper S	Lordco Australia Pty Ltd	Up to 1300 c.c.	4	109
22	Ian Wells	85	Honda Civic	I. Wells	Up to 1300 c.c.	5	108
23	Bill Evans	61	Datsun 120Y	Datsun Racing Team	Up to 1300 c.c.	6	107
24	David Crowther	62	Alfa Romeo GT Junior	Freds Treads Pty Ltd	Up to 1300 c.c.	7	104
25	John Ainsley	75	Mazda 1300	James Mason Motors	Up to 1300 c.c.	8	104
26	Philip George	31	Datsun 240K	James Mason Motors	2001c.c. to 3000 c.c	7	
DNF	Frank Porter	49	Alfa Romeo 2000 GTV	Clemens Sporting Car Services	1301 c.c. to 2000 c.c.		95
DNF	Ray Gulson	42	Alfa Romeo 2000 GTV	R. Gulson	1301 c.c. to 2000 c.c.		86
DNF	J Laing-Peach, G Moore	37	Triumph Dolomite Sprint	Ron Hodgson-Endrust Racing Team	1301 c.c. to 2000 c.c.		79
DNF	Allan Grice	12	Holden Torana LH SL/R 5000 L34	Craven Mild Racing	3001 c.c. and over		70
DNF	Wayne Renfrey	38	Alfa Romeo 2000 GTV	Gil Gordon Alfa - Geelong	1301 c.c. to 2000 c.c.		70
DNF	Bob Forbes, Wayne Negus	16	Holden Torana LH SL/R 5000 L34	B. Forbes Automotive	3001 c.c. and over		68
DNF	Lynn Brown		Mazda RX-3	James Mason Motors	2001c.c. to 3000 c.c		67
DNF	David Clement	35	Mazda RX-3	Eurocars Pty Ltd	1301 c.c. to 2000 c.c.		64
DNF	Graeme Blanchard	9	Holden Torana LH SL/R 5000 L34	Graeme Blanchard Holden	3001 c.c. and over		55
DNF	Murray Carter	18	Ford Falcon XB GT Hardtop	M. Carter	3001 c.c. and over		18
DNF	Fred Gibson	46	Alfa Romeo 2000 GTV	Alfa Romeo Dealers Aust.	1301 c.c. to 2000 c.c.		52
DNF	Geoff Wade	60	Ford Escort GT 1300	Peter Mac's Towing	Up to 1300 c.c.		45
DNF	Robin Dudfield	55	Alfa Romeo GT Junior	Alfa Romeo Owners Club of Aust.	Up to 1300 c.c.		39
DNF	Terry Wade	65	Morris Cooper S	Mini Bits	Up to 1300 c.c.		36
DNF	Geoff Newton	29	Ford Capri GT 3000	G. Newton	2001c.c. to 3000 c.c		31
DNF	Roger Bonhomme	73	Datsun 1200	Datsun Racing Team	Up to 1300 c.c.		31
DNF	Stuart Saker	22	Holden Torana LJ GTR XU-1	S. C. Saker	3001 c.c. and over		30
DNF	Allan Moffat	25	Ford Falcon XB GT Hardtop	Allan Moffat Racing	3001 c.c. and over		26
DNF	David Geddes	21	Chrysler Valiant Charger	D. Geddes	3001 c.c. and over		25
DNF	Caroline O'Shanesy	70	Morris Cooper S	C. O'Shanesy	Up to 1300 c.c.		18
DNF	Jim Keogh	4	Ford Falcon XB GT Hardtop		3001 c.c. and over		12
DNF	Paul Bernasconi	40	Alfa Romeo 2000 GTV	Alfa Romeo Dealers Aust.	1301 c.c. to 2000 c.c.		12
DNF	Ron Dickson	8	Holden Torana LH SL/R 5000 L34	M. Wright Motors	3001 c.c. and over		6
DNF	Ken Harrison	69	Ford Escort GT 1300	Ken Harrison Shell Racing	Up to 1300 c.c.		5
DNF	Peter Janson	17	Holden Torana LH SL/R 5000 L34	Masseys Holden	3001 c.c. and over		1

Preceded by 1974 Sandown 250	Sandown 250; 1975	Succeeded by 1976 Hang Ten 400
