= 1975 Australian Manufacturers' Championship =

Motor racing competition

The 1975 Australian Manufacturers' Championship was an Australian motor racing competition for Group C Touring Cars. It was sanctioned by the Confederation of Australian Motor Sport as an Australian National Title and was the fifth Australian Manufacturers' Championship.

The championship was won by Holden from Ford and Mazda.

== Race schedule ==
The championship was contested over a five round series.

| Rd. | Race name | Circuit | State | Date | Winning driver | Car | Report |
| 1 | Chesterfield 250 | Adelaide International Raceway | South Australia | 24 August | Colin Bond | Holden Torana SL/R 5000 L34 | |
| 2 | Sandown 250 | Sandown | Victoria | 14 September | Peter Brock | Holden Torana SL/R 5000 L34 | Report |
| 3 | Hardie Ferodo 1000 | Mount Panorama, Bathurst | New South Wales | 6 October | Peter Brock | Holden Torana SL/R 5000 L34 | Report |
| 4 | Rothmans 300 | Surfers Paradise | Queensland | 9 November | Allan Moffat | Ford XB Falcon GT | |
| 5 | Phillip Island 500K | Phillip Island | Victoria | 23 November | Peter Brock | Holden Torana SL/R 5000 L34 | Report |

Each round was a single race of 250 km distance or greater, open to Group C Touring Cars.

== Classes ==
Cars competed in four classes based on engine capacity:

- Up to and including 1300cc
- 1301-2000cc
- 2001-3000cc
- Over 3000cc

== Points system ==
For all rounds other than the Bathurst round, championship points were awarded on a 9-8-7-6-5-4-3-2-1 basis for the first nine places in each class.
For the Bathurst round, championship points were awarded on an 18-16-14-12-10-8-6-4-2 basis for the first nine places in each class.
Additional points were awarded at all rounds on a 4-3-2-1 basis for the first four outright places.
Only the highest placed vehicle from each manufacturer was eligible to score points at any given round.

== Championship standings ==
| Position | Manufacturer | Car | Ade. | San. | Bat. | Sur. | Phi. | Total |
| 1 | Holden | Holden LH Torana SLR5000 L34 | 13 | 13 | 22 | 11 | 13 | 72 |
| 2 | Ford | Ford XB Falcon GT & Ford Escort Mk 1 RS2000 | 11 | 9 | 16 | 13 | 11 | 60 |
| 3 | Mazda | Mazda RX-3 | 9 | 9 | 18 | 9 | 8 | 53 |
| 4 | Leyland | Morris Cooper S | 9 | 9 | 18 | 9 | 6 | 51 |
| 5 | Alfa Romeo | Alfa Romeo 2000 GTV | 9 | 3 | 18 | 9 | 8 | 47 |
| 6 | Datsun | Datsun 240K, Datsun 260Z 2+2 & Datsun 1200 | 5 | 6 | 16 | - | 9 | 35 |
| 7 | Honda | Honda Civic | 7 | 8 | 4 | 3 | 8 | 30 |
| 8 | Toyota | Toyota Corolla | 3 | - | - | 5 | - | 8 |
| | Mercedes-Benz | Mercedes-Benz 280E | - | 3 | - | - | 5 | 8 |
| | BMW | BMW 2002Ti | - | - | - | 8 | - | 8 |

Note: Only models which contributed to a manufacturer’s points total are shown in the above table.
