= Alfa Romeo GTV =

Alfa Romeo GTV refers to the following motor vehicle models:

- Alfa Romeo GTV and Spider (Type 916) (1995-2005)
- Alfa Romeo GT Veloce, a trim level of the Alfa Romeo 105/115 Series Coupés (1967-1976)
- Alfa Romeo GTV, Type 116 (1976-1987), a trim level of the Alfa Romeo Alfetta
