= Moris Janashvili =

Israeli-Georgian musical artist and businessperson

Moris Janashvili at his birthday celebration in Israel.

Moris Janashvili (Georgian: მორის ჯანაშვილი; born April 9, 1960) is an Israeli-Georgian singer, songwriter, musician, producer and businessperson. Entrepreneur and owner of GTV – Georgian-language Israeli television channel.

Janashvili is considered one of the pillars of the Georgian community in Israel and one of the founding fathers in the musical culture of Georgian Jewry. He is one of the most prominent Georgian singers and has a successful career in Georgia, Israel and around the world.

== Youth and early career ==
Janashvili was born in Georgia in 1960. At the age of 12 he learned to play accordion and piano and even danced in the Georgia National Dance Company.

In 1976, at the age of 16, he immigrated to Israel with his mother. In 1982 he founded the 'Kolan' band, which sang Georgian folkloric songs, mainly at the community events. In 1985, Janashvili decided to embark on a solo career, which culminated twice in first place in the Georgian Song Festival.

== Musical success ==
The breakthrough of Janashvili took place in 1989 in one of his performances in Georgia, and since then he has been invited to appear on prestigious stages in Russia, Europe and the United States. After that, he founded the 'Champagne' band, a leading band of celebrations in the Georgian community in Israel and around the world.

To date, Janashvili has released only four albums.

== Entry into business ==
In 2004, Janashvili initiated and established a Georgian-language Israeli television channel called GTV. The channel is the only one of its kind for members of the Georgian community in Israel.

On June 26, 2014, he went on a special tour of his new album, accompanied by a large group of musicians at the Tel Aviv Culture Palace, and ended the tour at the Philharmonic Hall in the Georgian capital of Tbilisi. At the end of the show, a festive ceremony was held during which the Ministry of Culture and Monument Protection of Georgia awarded Janashvili a gold star in his name on the famous avenue in the capital. Janashvili is the only Israeli citizen to receive a star on the avenue.

In 2016 he opened 'Kinto', a Kosher Georgian restaurant in Tel Aviv.
