= Gateway Television =

American-owned Pan-African subscription TV network

Gateway Television (GTV)
- Type: Television
- Country: United Kingdom
- Availability: Africa
- Broadcast area: Africa
- Owner: The Blackstone Group
- Dissolved: January 2009
- Official website: www.gatewaycommunications.com

Gateway Television (GTV) is a Pan-African, American-owned subscription TV network based in London, owned by Gateway Communications. The British-based company Gateway Television is owned by the American company, The Blackstone Group.

GTV held the rights to 80% of league matches for the Premier League.

They also held the rights for the CECAFA Cup in 2007, in an agreement that was scheduled to last for four years.

== History ==
In February 2007, Gateway Communications announced its entry into the subscription television market. The service was to be rolled out in phases, launching with three exclusive channels: G-Prime, G-Sports 1, and G-Sports 2. The goal was to become a pay-TV operator for Africa that did not simply relay European or American content. In March, it was decided that GTV would use the Eutelsat W3A satellite to deliver its services, with the aim of increasing the number of pay-TV subscribers in Africa. The first phase would see the service launched in East Africa, followed by West and Southern Africa. Additionally, GTV aimed to attract new subscribers by acquiring 80% of the Premier League matches.

GTV was created to provide subscription television to less wealthy individuals, with plans to offer services at affordable prices.

GTV's growth was supported by a $40 million investment from the Swedish company Kinnevik, along with additional investments from Citigroup, Noonday Global Management, and Avenue Investment Management.

GTV held its Botswanan consumer launch at the Fashion Lounge in Phalakane, Francistown, in August 2007, promising lower prices and increased competition to end DStv's monopoly in the country. These tactics infuriated DStv, prompting it to retaliate by creating a low-cost package, among other measures. As GTV operated longer in a country, it gained more stability. At closing time, GTV had 20,000 subscribers in Uganda, although the number of markets it served remained relatively low.

The service launched in October 2007, beginning regular operations on the 27th of the month. It offered 12 channels: the entertainment channel G-Prime, MTV Base, Kiss, three of its own sports channels, the God Channel, MGM, BBC World, Sky News, TV5MONDE, and the English service of Al-Jazeera. While new channels were planned to be added, this would not be at the expense of its subscribers. African movies, mainly from Nollywood, were being gathered to provide more African content on the platform. Four additional channels were added in April 2008.

In 2008, GTV expanded into Francophone markets to compete against the Canal+ Horizons package. The expansion occurred during a challenging period for the operator, as its finances were beginning to struggle.

As its finances worsened, Kinnevik sold its parent company, Gateway, to Vodacom.

On 30 January 2009, GTV announced it had gone into liquidation blaming "the current financial and global crisis". Gateway had significantly increased its investments since 2007 to launch the operator, but the international economic crisis of the time created an excessive burden, leading to the service's withdrawal. Other factors included the limited number of channels compared to DStv.
