= GTV (Israeli TV channel) =

Israeli television channel

GTV is a television channel for the Georgian diaspora in Israel. The channel started broadcasting in 2004 and is available on both Yes and HOT on channel 123. The channel is owned by Moris Janashvili, who also has a role in Kinto, a Georgian restaurant.

== History ==
Moris Janashvili founded the channel on the basis that the Georgian TV channels did not have rights to broadcast the entirety of their content abroad, primarily due to rights issues with foreign content such as American movies. Janashvili started working for the upcoming channel in 2002 and started broadcasting on Yes as a subscription channel costing 24,90 NIS. As the channel was initially available on Yes, the channel expected 10,000 subscribers in its first year, but only gained 7,000. About 3,000 subscribers moved from HOT to Yes because of its availability. Initially on HOT, it held experimental broadcasts in areas with high Georgian population, namely Ashdod and Ashkelon, to subscribers of the pre-merger Tevel cable company. If the channel would become successful, it would start broadcasting on HOT nationally.

On May 27, 2004, it aired a friendly match between the Israeli and Georgian national football teams. In October 2006, the channel announced that it would start broadcasting on HOT.

When the channel went on air, GTV had invested US$600,000. By October 2006, it had received further US$500,000 in investments, having produced over 300 hours of original content. GTV relayed news from a commercial channel in Georgia, with three editions a day, acquired Georgian feature films, a Who Wants to be a Millionaire?-inspired game show, an interview program and music videos. In September 2006, it was made available on JumpTV, becoming the first channel in the Georgian language to be carried. HOT added the channel in January 2007.
