= Alfa Romeo 105/115 Series Coupés =

Alfa Romeo 105/115 series coupés
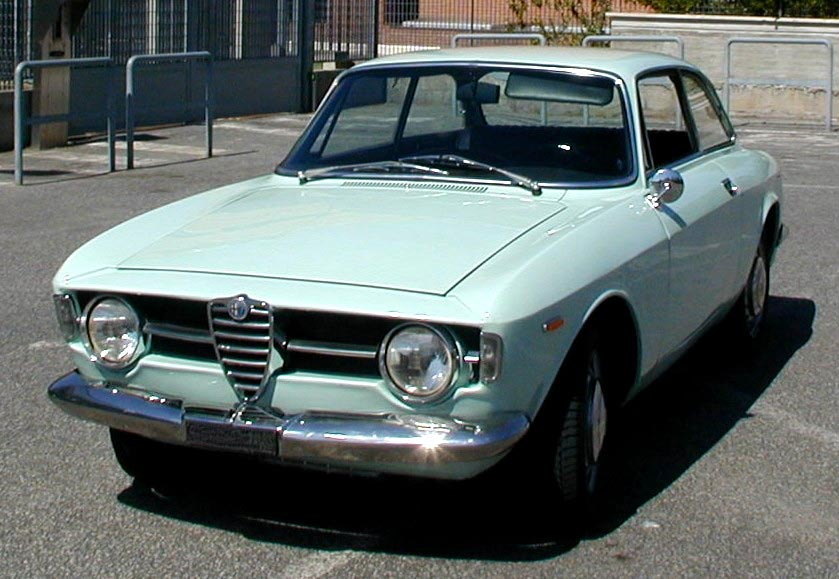
- Alfa Romeo GT 1300 Junior, early model

Overview
- Manufacturer: Alfa Romeo
- Production: 1963–1977
- Assembly: Italy: Arese, Milan; Portugal: Setúbal (Movauto); South Africa: Rosslyn, Gauteng
- Designer: Giorgetto Giugiaro at Bertone (Sprint, GT, GTV); Carrozzeria Touring (GTC); Ercole Spada at Zagato (Junior Zagato)

Body and chassis
- Class: Sports car
- Body style: 2-door 2+2 coupé 2-door cabriolet
- Layout: Front-engine, rear-wheel-drive
- Related: Alfa Romeo Giulia Berlina; Alfa Romeo Spider; Alfa Romeo 1750 and 2000 Berlina

Powertrain
- Engine: 1.3–2.0 L Twin Cam I4
- Transmission: 5-speed manual

Chronology
- Predecessor: Alfa Romeo Giulietta Coupé
- Successor: Alfa Romeo Alfetta GT, GTV & GTV6

The Alfa Romeo 105 and 115 series coupés are a range of cars made by the Italian manufacturer Alfa Romeo from 1963 until 1977, based on a shortened floorpan from the Giulia saloon. They were the successors to the Giulietta Sprint coupé.

== Bodywork ==
Giorgetto Giugiaro designed the basic body shape shared by all models for Bertone. It was one of his first major projects for Bertone and drew heavily on his earlier design for the Alfa Romeo 2000 Sprint/2600 Sprint. The balance of glass and metal, the influence of the front and rear glass on the cabin shape, and the flat grille with integrated headlamps were groundbreaking styling features for the era.

A limited production (1000 units) convertible was a modification of the standard car by Touring of Milan, offered as a catalogue model by Alfa Romeo called the Giulia Sprint GTC.

A small number of the GT Junior Zagato were also built with a very different, aerodynamic two-seater coupé body designed by Ercole Spada for Zagato of Milan. These too were offered by Alfa Romeo as catalogue models, such as the GT 1300 Junior Zagato and later GT 1600 Junior Zagato.

== Mechanical features ==
All models feature the four cylinder, all-light-alloy Alfa Romeo Twin Cam engine in capacities ranging from 1290 cc to 1962 cc, all with two valves per cylinder. All versions of this engine fitted to the 105 series coupés featured twin carburetors, except for US market 1750 GTV and 2000 GTV cars which were fitted with mechanical port fuel injection by SPICA. Competition models featured cylinder heads with twin spark plugs. Common to all models was also a five-speed manual transmission and solid disc brakes on all four wheels, although at South Africa's Brits plant a few automatic 2000 GTVs were made for the local market. These featured the three-speed ZF automatic transmission. The rear suspension uses a live axle with coil springs. Air conditioning and a limited-slip rear differential were optional on the later models. A limited-slip differential was standard on the GTV 2000 for North America 1972–1974. Factory air conditioning was available on the 1973–1974 only in the USA.

== Models ==
Version	Years of production	Units produced
Sprint GT	from 1963 to 1966	21,542
Sprint GTC	from 1964 to 1966	1,000
Sprint GTV	from 1965 to 1968	14,240
1750 GTV	from 1967 to 1972	44,269
2000 GTV	from 1971 to 1976	37,459
GT 1300 Junior	from 1965 to 1977	91,195
GT 1600 Junior	from 1972 to 1976	14,299

The 105 series coupés featured the GT (Gran Turismo) model description, which was common to all models in one form or another.

The various models in this range can be considered in two broad categories.

On one hand were the various Gran Turismos (GT) and Gran Turismo Veloces (GTV), (veloce is Italian for "fast"). These were meant to be the most sporting cars in the Alfa Romeo range and sold very well to enthusiastic motorists around the world. The first model available was the Giulia Sprint GT (1963) which evolved into the Giulia Sprint GT Veloce (1966), the 1750 GTV (1967) and the 2000 GTV (1972–1976), with engines increasing in cubic capacity from 1570 cc (Giulia Sprint GT/GTV) through 1779 cc (1750 GTV) to 1962 cc (2000 GTV). A limited production (1000 units) convertible, the Giulia Sprint GTC, was based on the Giulia Sprint GT, modified by Touring of Milan. It was only made over two years from 1964 to 1966.

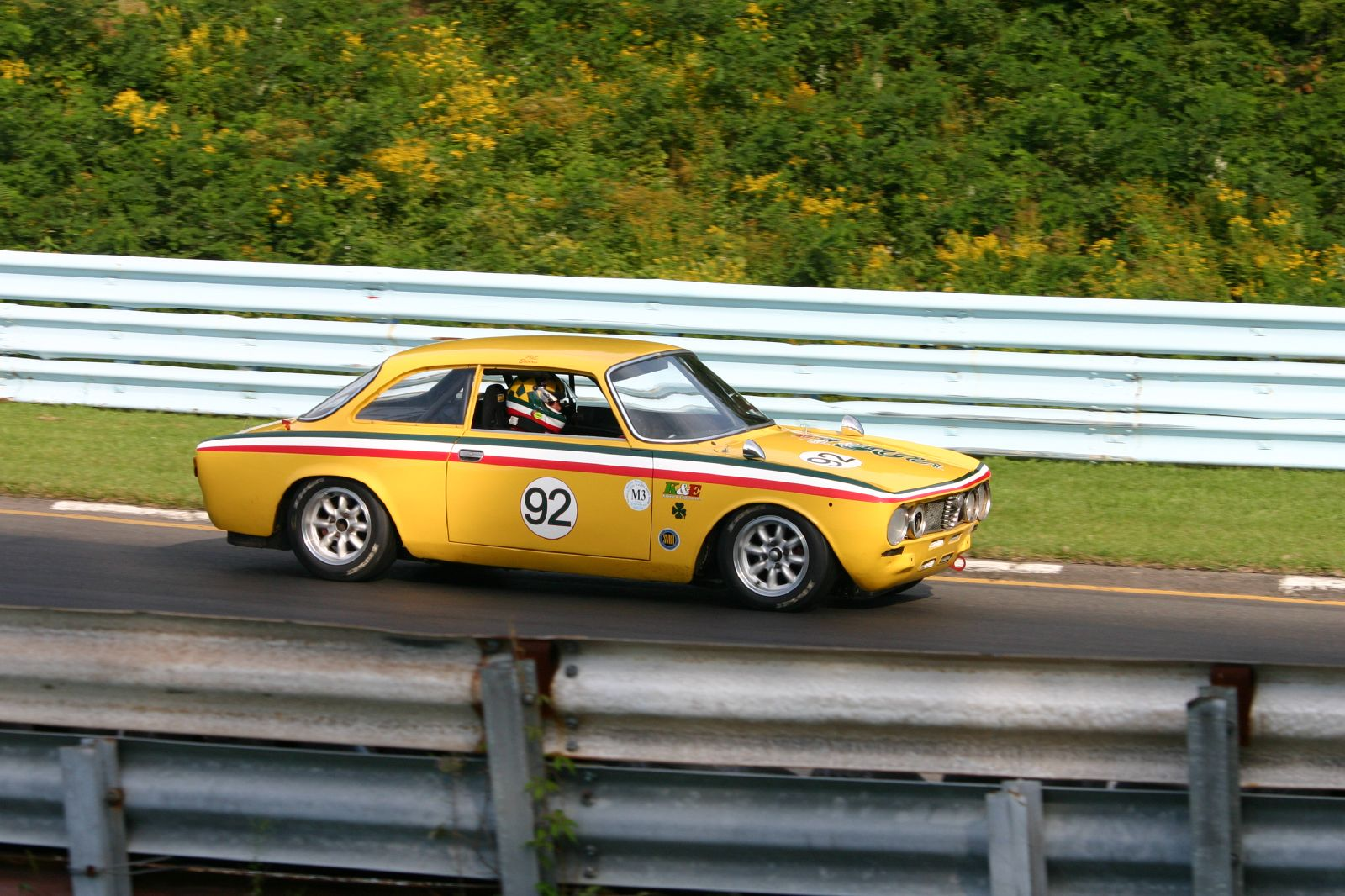
1972 2000 GTV in a vintage race at Watkins Glen International.

On the other hand, was the GT Junior range, which featured engines with smaller cubic capacities. GT Juniors sold in great numbers to people who wanted a sporting, stylish car that handled well, but either did not require the maximum in engine power, or could not afford the taxation on larger engine capacities in some markets - most notably, Alfa Romeo's home Italian market. Junior models began with the first GT 1300 Junior in 1966. The GT 1300 Junior continued until 1976 with the 1290 cc engine and various modifications incorporating features from the evolution of the GT's and GTV's. From 1972 a GT 1600 Junior model was also available, with the 1570 cc engine.

The 1300 Junior and 1600 Junior also became available with a very different, aerodynamic two-seater coupé body designed by Ercole Spada for Zagato of Milan. These models were the GT 1300 Junior Zagato and GT 1600 Junior Zagato.

Both categories were used to derive GTA ("Alleggerita", or "lightened") models, which were specifically intended for competition homologation in their respective engine size classes. The GTA's featured extensive modifications for racing, so they were priced much higher than the standard models and sold in much smaller numbers. Practically all GTA's made were used in competition, where they had a long and successful history in various classes and category. These models included the Giulia Sprint GTA, GTA 1300 Junior, and GTAm (a much evolved version of the GTA built by Autodelta).

Although not commonly thought of as a 105 Series coupé variant, the Alfa Romeo Montreal used a strengthened and slightly modified 105 series floorpan and suspension.

== GT and GTV models ==
=== Giulia Sprint GT (1963–1965) ===
Alfa Romeo Giulia Sprint GT
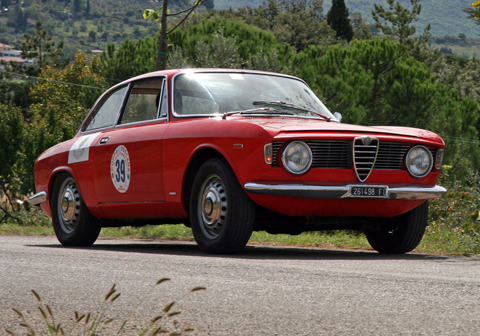
- 1965 Alfa Romeo Giulia Sprint GT

Overview
- Production: 1963–1965

Body and chassis
- Body style: 2-door coupé

Powertrain
- Engine: 1.6 L Twin Cam I4

Dimensions
- Wheelbase: 2,350 mm (92.5 in)
- Length: 4,080 mm (160.6 in)
- Width: 1,580 mm (62.2 in)
- Height: 1,315 mm (51.8 in)
- Kerb weight: 950 kg (2,094 lb)

Tipo: 105.02, 105.04 (right hand drive). Engine: 00502.

The Alfa Romeo Giulia Sprint GT was the first Giulia sport model introduced, and was manufactured from 1963 to 1965. It was revealed at a press event held at the then newly opened Arese plant on 9 September 1963, and displayed later the same month at the Frankfurt Motor Show. In its original form the Bertone body is known as scalino (step) or "step front", because of the leading edge of the engine compartment lid which sat 1 cm (0.4 in) above the nose of the car. The Giulia Sprint GT can be distinguished from the later models by the following features:

- Exterior badging: Alfa Romeo logo on the front grille, a chrome script reading "Giulia Sprint GT" on the boot lid, and rectangular "Disegno di Bertone" badges aft of the front wheel arches.
- Flat, chrome grille in plain, wide rectangular mesh without additional chrome bars.
- Single-piece chrome bumpers; no overriders.

Inside the cabin the padded vinyl dashboard was characterised by a concave horizontal fascia, finished in grey anti-glare crackle-effect paint. Four round instruments were inset in the fascia in front of the driver. The larger diameter inner pair were tachometer and speedometer; the outer ones were smaller combination instruments, the left hand one holding oil pressure and fuel level gauges, the right hand one oil and water temperature gauges. The steering wheel was non-dished, with three aluminium spokes, a thin bakelite rim and a centre horn button. Vinyl-covered seats with cloth centres and a fully carpeted floor were standard, while leather upholstery was an extra-cost option.

The Sprint GT's could be ordered in the Bertone De Luxe body which included extra options. One of the extra options was leather seats. There were five leather seat colours available for the Sprint GT they were dark brown leather (pelle testa di moro), red leather (pelle rossa), black, grey and beige.

After initially marketing it as a four-seater, Alfa Romeo soon changed its definition of the car to a more realistic 2+2.

The Giulia Sprint GT was fitted with the 1570 cc displacement version of Alfa Romeo's all-aluminium twin cam inline four (78 mm bore × 82 mm stroke, 6.38 L oil sump, 7.41 L radiator), which had debuted on the 1962 Giulia Berlina. Breathing through two twin-choke Weber 40 DCOE 4 carburettors, on the Sprint GT this engine produced 106 PS DIN (78 kW; 105 hp) or 122 PS SAE gross at 6000 rpm. Like all subsequent models, the Sprint GT was equipped with an all-synchromesh 5-speed manual transmission. The braking system comprised four Dunlop disc brakes and a vacuum servo. The rear brakes featured an unusual arrangement with the slave cylinders mounted on the axle tubes, operating the calipers by a system of levers and cranks. According to Alfa Romeo the car could reach a top speed of "over 180 km/h (112 mph)"; Italian car magazine Quattroruote observed a top speed of 181.935 km/h (113 mph) in its December 1964 road test.

In total 21,902 Giulia Sprint GT were produced from 1963 to 1965, when the model was superseded by the Giulia Sprint GT Veloce. Of these 2,274 were right hand drive: 1,354 cars fully finished in Arese, and 920 shipped in complete knock-down kit form for foreign assembly.

=== Giulia GTC (1964–1966) ===
Alfa Romeo Giulia GTC
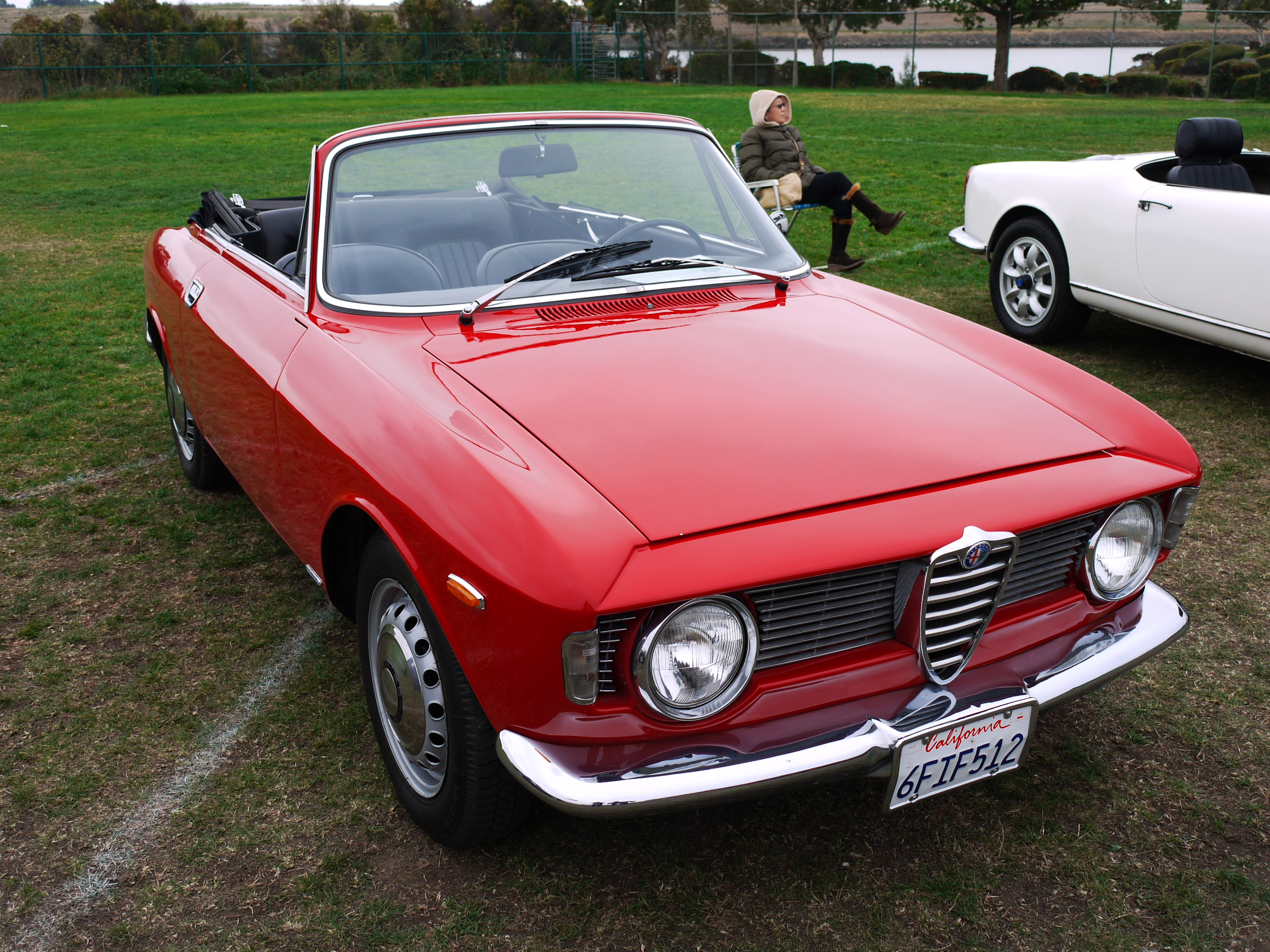

Overview
- Production: 1964–1966 around 1,000 produced
- Designer: Carrozzeria Touring

Body and chassis
- Body style: 2-door cabriolet

Powertrain
- Engine: 1.6 L Twin Cam I4

Dimensions
- Wheelbase: 2,350 mm (92.5 in)
- Length: 4,080 mm (160.6 in)
- Width: 1,580 mm (62.2 in)
- Height: 1,315 mm (51.8 in)
- Kerb weight: 905 kg (1,995 lb)

Tipo: 105.25, 105.29 (right hand drive). Engine: 00502.

The Alfa Romeo Giulia GTC was a cabriolet version of the Giulia Sprint GT only offered between 1965 and 1966, and built in around 1,000 examples. While entering production in 1964, the cabriolet was introduced to the press (together with the Giulia Super) at the Monza race track on 4 March 1965, and then made its public debut at the March 1965 Geneva Motor Show.

The Giulia GTC was based on the coupé's body and parts, maintaining the same specifications and performance, with the cabriolet modification being carried out by Carrozzeria Touring of Milan.

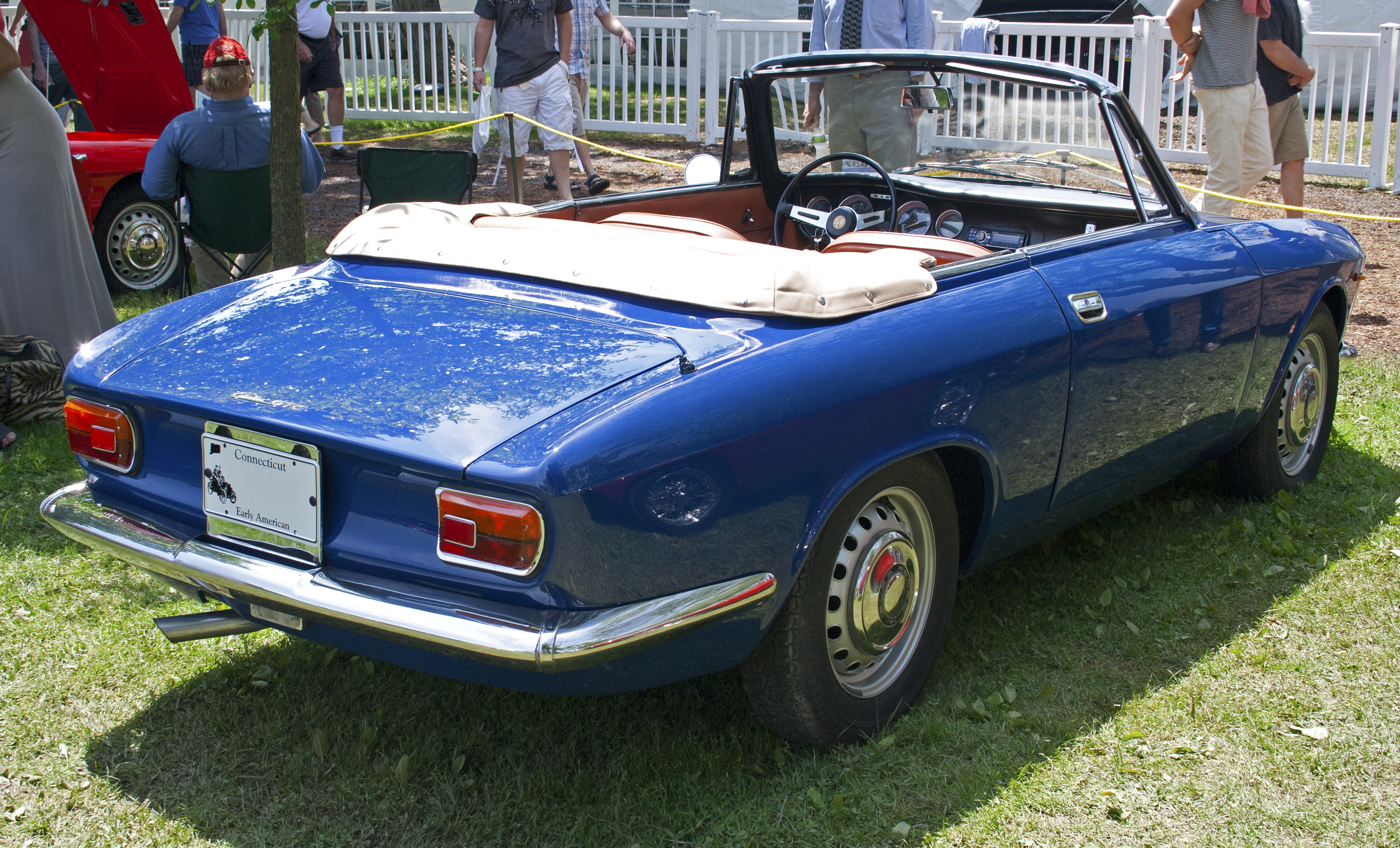
Rear three-quarters view of a 1966 Giulia GTC

Besides the convertible top, distinguishing features are the dashboard finished in black instead of grey crackle paint, and a script reading "Giulia GTC" on the boot lid. The 2+2 seating layout was retained. To restore some of the bodyshell rigidity lost by removing the fixed roof and pillars, Carrozzeria Touring added reinforcement to several areas of the bodyshell. Through the production life of the model, several modifications to the reinforcement applied were made by Touring, apparently in an effort to increase the rigidity of the body. Carrozzeria Touring was in financial trouble when the Giulia GTC was introduced; the company went out of business shortly after production of this model ended.

Alfa Romeo Giulia GTC, production by year
Model	1964	1965	1966	1964–1966
Giulia GTC (LHD)	106	548	247	899
Giulia GTC (RHD)	—	54	45	99
Total	106	600	292	998

=== Giulia Sprint GT Veloce (1965–1968) ===
Alfa Romeo Giulia Sprint GT Veloce
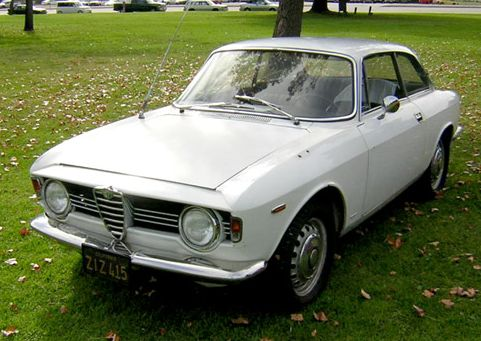

Overview
- Production: 1965–1968

Body and chassis
- Body style: 2-door coupé

Powertrain
- Engine: 1.6 L Twin Cam I4
- Transmission: 5-speed manual

Dimensions
- Length: 4,089 mm (161.0 in)
- Width: 1,575 mm (62.0 in)
- Height: 1,321 mm (52.0 in)
- Kerb weight: 1,012 kg (2,231 lb)

Tipo: 105.36, 105.37 (right hand drive). Engine: 00536.

In 1966 the Giulia Sprint GT was replaced by the Alfa Romeo Giulia Sprint GT Veloce, very similar but featuring a number of improvements: a revised engine—slightly more powerful and with more torque—better interior fittings and changes to the exterior trim. The Sprint GT Veloce was introduced at the 36th Geneva Motor Show in March 1966, and then tested by the international specialist press in Gardone on the Garda Lake. Production began in 1965 and ended in 1968. The Giulia Sprint GT Veloce can be most easily distinguished from other models by the following features:

- Badging as per Giulia Sprint GT, with the addition of round enamel badges on the C-pillar—a green Quadrifoglio (four-leaf clover) on an ivory background—and a chrome "Veloce" script on the tail panel.
- Black mesh grille with three horizontal chrome bars.
- Grille has 7 bars instead of 6.
- Stainless steel bumpers, as opposed to the chromed mild steel bumpers on the Giulia Sprint GT. The bumpers are the same shape, but are made in two pieces (front) and three pieces (rear) with small covers hiding the joining rivets.

Inside the main changes from the Giulia Sprint GT were imitation wood dashboard fascia instead of the previous anti-glare grey finish, front seats revised to a mild "bucket" design, and a dished three aluminium spoke steering wheel, with a black rim and horn buttons through the spokes.

The Veloce's type 00536 engine, identical to the Spider 1600 Duetto's, featured modifications compared to the Giulia Sprint GT's type 00502—such as larger diameter (37 instead of 35 mm) exhaust valves. As a result, it produced 109 PS DIN (80 kW; 108 hp) or 125 PS SAE at 6,000 rpm, an increase of 3 PS DIN (2 kW; 3 hp) over the previous model, and significantly more torque. According to the manufacturer top speed now exceeded 185 km/h (115 mph). Early Giulia Sprint GT Veloces featured the same Dunlop disc brake system as the Giulia Sprint GT, while later cars substituted ATE disc brakes as pioneered on the GT 1300 Junior in 1966. The ATE brakes featured a handbrake system entirely separate from the pedal brakes, using drum brakes incorporated in the rear disc castings.

The Veloce's could be ordered in the Bertone De Luxe body option which included extra options. One of the extra options was a leather interior. The only leather colours available for the Veloce were dark brown leather (pelle testa di moro) or red leather (pelle rossa). The seat panels had perforations in the leather. There were three versions of the GT Veloce 1600 Version 1 (FIA 5126 Group 1, early): Had deep rear arches and Dunlop brakes front and rear. Version 2:(Referred to as Group 2 in FIA 5126). Had deep rear arches and ATE adapters on the front Dunlop uprights to take ATE calipers. The rear axle had ATE calipers. The Group 2 (Version 2) cars were built with limited-slip differentials and with different ratios in the gearbox and a selection of wheel widths 5-inch, 5.5-inch and 6-inch on a 15-inch diameter rim as well as some other features. Version 3 (FIA 5126 Group 1, late): Had high arches and solid ATE uprights, with no adapters as seen in the article in Classic Cars magazine page 88 April 1997. The rear axle had ATE calipers. Production of the GT Veloce 1600 started in 1965 for LHD cars and 1966 for RHD cars. There were only 6 colors for the interior seats of the GT Veloce 1600. Two colors for leather were dark brown or red, plus two colors for vinyl they were mid grey (nero fumo) or light tan (cuoio) and two colors for a cloth/vinyl combination grey/mid grey (panno grigio unito-finta pelle nero fumo) and light tan/tan (panno cammello-finta pelle cuoio). There were only 4 colours for the door cards two for leather: dark brown leather (pelle testa di moro) or red leather (pelle rossa) and two for vinyl they were mid grey (nero fumo) or light tan (cuoio). Sources FIA documents, Alfa Romeo Italian language parts catalogue, Classic Cars magazine 1997 and Steve105:{moderator for Alfabb}.

https://www.alfabb.com/threads/105-leather-deluxe-option.227305/#post-4667561

There were only two colors for the carpet mid grey (colore nero fumo) or red (colore rosso). No documentary evidence exists (in the Italian language) that black leather or black vinyl or black cloth was used on the seats or door cards was ever used by the Alfa Romeo factory in the GT Veloce 1600. No documentary evidence exists (in the Italian language) that black carpet was ever used by the Alfa Romeo factory in the GT Veloce 1600. No evidence exist to date via Italian parts catalogue or a Certificate of origin for a GT Veloce 1600 (in the Italian language) that states GT Veloce 1600 had a black (nero) interior or an aramanto or rosso interior in vinyl. Sources Alfa Romeo Italian language parts catalogue and Steve105:{moderator for Alfabb}.

Though the Sprint GT Veloce's replacement—the 1750 GT Veloce—was introduced in 1967, production continued throughout the year and thirty final cars were completed in 1968. By then total Giulia Sprint GT Veloce production amounted to 14,240 examples. 1,407 of these were right hand drive cars, and 380 right hand drive complete knock-down kits.

=== 1750 GT Veloce (1967–1972) ===
Alfa Romeo 1750 GT Veloce
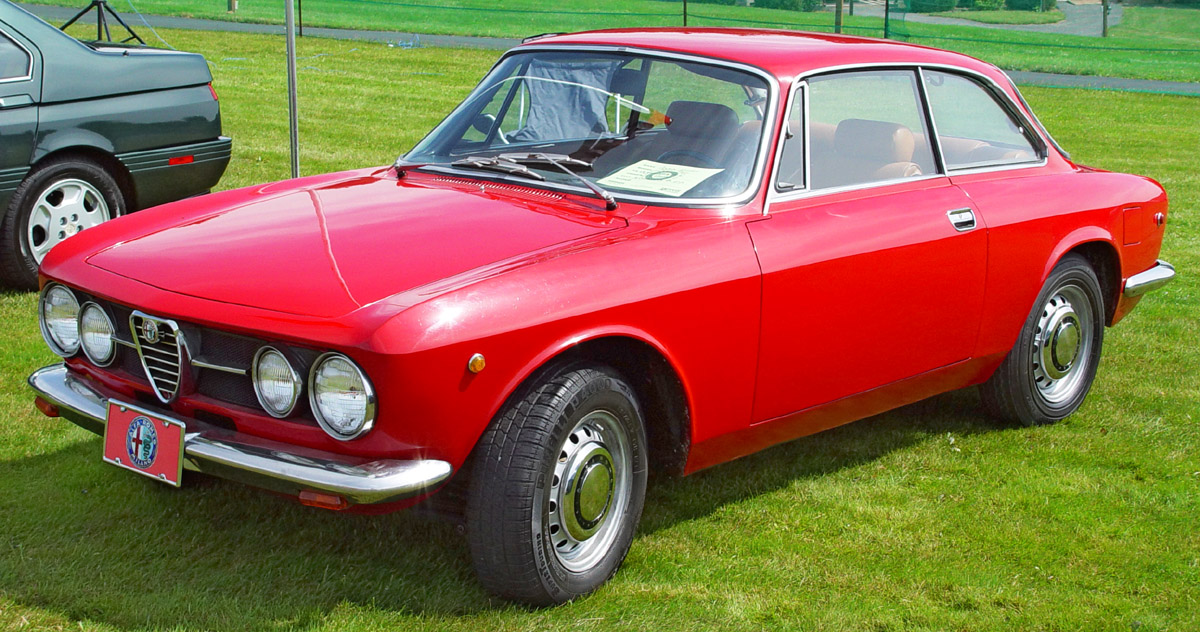

Overview
- Production: 1967–1972

Body and chassis
- Body style: 2-door coupé

Powertrain
- Engine: 1.8 L Twin Cam I4

Dimensions
- Wheelbase: 2,350 mm (92.5 in)
- Length: 4,089 mm (161.0 in)
- Width: 1,575 mm (62.0 in)
- Height: 1,321 mm (52.0 in)
- Kerb weight: 1,038 kg (2,288 lb)

Tipo: 105.44, 105.45 (right hand drive), 105.51 (USA).
Engine: 00548, 00571 (USA).

The Alfa Romeo 1750 GT Veloce (also known as 1750 GTV) entered production in late 1967 along with the 1750 Berlina sedan and 1750 Spider. The cars were first shown to the press in January 1968. The same type of engine was used to power all three versions; this rationalisation was a first for Alfa Romeo.

The 1750 GTV replaced the Giulia Sprint GT Veloce and introduced many updates and modifications. Most significantly, the engine capacity was increased to 1779 cc displacement (80 mm bore × 88.5 mm stroke, 6.61l oil capacity, 9.58l radiator capacity). Peak power from the engine was increased to 122 PS (90 kW; 120 hp) at 5500 rpm. The stroke was lengthened from 82 to 88.5 mm over the 1600 engine, and a reduced rev limit from 7000 rpm to 6000 rpm. Maximum torque was increased to 186 N⋅m (137 lb⋅ft) at 3000 rpm. A higher ratio final drive was fitted (10/41 instead of 9/41) but the same gearbox ratios were retained. The result was that, on paper, the car had only slightly improved performance compared to the Giulia Sprint GT Veloce, but on the road it was much more flexible to drive and it was easier to maintain higher average speeds for fast touring. For the United States market, the 1779 cc engine was fitted with a fuel injection system made by Alfa Romeo subsidiary SPICA, to meet emission control laws that were coming into effect at the time. Fuel injection was also featured on Canadian market cars after 1971. Carburetors were retained for other markets.

The chassis was also significantly modified. Tire size went to 165/14 Pirelli Cinturato or Michelin XAS from 155/15 Pirelli Cinturato and wheel size to 5 1/2J x 14 instead of 5J x 15, giving a wider section and slightly smaller rolling diameter. The suspension geometry was also revised, and an anti-roll bar was fitted to the rear suspension. ATE disc brakes were fitted from the outset, but with bigger front discs and calipers than the ones fitted to GT 1300 Juniors and late Giulia Sprint GT Veloces. The changes resulted in significant improvements to the handling and braking, which once again made it easier for the driver to maintain high average speeds for fast touring.

The 1750 GTV also departed significantly from the earlier cars externally. New nose styling eliminated the "stepped" hood of the Giulia Sprint GT, GTC, GTA and early GT 1300 Juniors and incorporated four headlamps. For the 1971 model year, United States market 1750 GTV's also featured larger rear light clusters (there were no 1970 model year Alfas on the US market). Besides the chrome "1750" badge on the bootlid, there was also a round Alfa Romeo badge. Similar Quadrifoglio badges to those on the Giulia Sprint GT Veloce were fitted on C pillars, but the Quadrifoglio was coloured gold instead of green. The car also adopted the higher rear wheelarches first seen on the GT 1300 Junior.

The interior was also much modified over that of earlier cars. There was a new dashboard with large speedometer and tachometer instruments in twin binnacles closer to the driver's line of sight. The instruments were mounted at a more conventional angle, avoiding the reflections caused by the upward angled flat dash of earlier cars. Conversely, auxiliary instruments were moved to angled bezels in the centre console, further from the driver's line of sight than before. The new seats introduced adjustable headrests which merged with the top of the seat when fully down. The window winder levers, the door release levers and the quarterlight vent knobs were also restyled. The remote release for the boot (trunk) lid, located on the inside of the door opening on the B-post just under the door lock striker, was moved from the right hand side of the car to the left hand side. The location of this item was always independent of whether the car was left hand drive or right hand drive.

Early (Series 1) 1750 GTV's featured the same bumpers as the Giulia Sprint GT Veloce, with the front bumper modified to mount the indicator / sidelight units on the top of its corners, or under the bumper on US market cars.

The Series 2 1750 GTV of 1970 introduced other mechanical changes, including a dual circuit braking system (split front and rear, with separate servos). The brake and clutch pedals on left hand drive cars were also of an improved pendant design, instead of the earlier floor-hinged type. On right hand drive cars the floor-hinged pedals were retained, as there was no space for the pedal box behind the carburetors. Externally, the series 2 1750 GTV is identified by new, slimmer bumpers with front and rear overriders. The combined front indicator and sidelight units were now mounted to the front panel instead of the front bumper, except again on the 1971–72 US/Canadian market cars. The interior was slightly modified, with the seats retaining the same basic outline but following a simpler design.

According to some, 44,269 1750 GTVs were made before their replacement came along. Others calculate it as 32,265 1750 GTVs, due to two typographic errors of Fusi's famous reference book. There were 1,542 AR 105 44 cars built rather than 11,542{in 1970 see explanation below}.

The GT Veloce 1750 Series 1 could be ordered in the Bertone De Luxe body which included extra options. One of the extra options was a leather interior (seats and door cards). The only leather colours available for the GT Veloce 1750 Series 1 were dark brown leather (pelle testa di moro) or red leather (pelle rossa). The seats had perforations in the leather. Source Alfa Romeo parts manual and Steve105:{moderator for Alfabb}. There were a total of at least 32,265 1750 GTV cars not 44,269, this can be explained by how you interpret two typographic errors of Fusi's book on pages 844 and 845 see ref 3. To summarize the correction for 1970 there were 1,542 AR 105 44 cars built not 11,542. Source Alfa Romeo parts manual Fusi's book and Steve105:{moderator for Alfabb}. The 1750 GTV could race under FIA rules with aluminium doors and boot lid. The 1750 GTV was allowed to have aluminium doors and boot lid in one of two ways. The first way was to use any 1750 GTV LHD car (starting from body number AR 1350001) or 1750 GTV RHD car (starting from body number AR 1450001) and then use homologation FIA 1565 Group 2 plus the FIA rules of 1st Jan 1970 and have them installed to run in FIA Group 2 in 1970/71. The second way was to use any 1750 GTV USA LHD car (starting from body number AR 1350001) that had been homologated as a GTAm and this time use the homologation FIA 1576 Group 2 variation 3/2V and have them installed to run in FIA Group 2 in 1970/71. In 1972 FIA rules changed and 1750 GTVs could not race with aluminium doors and boot lid in FIA events. Source Alfa Romeo parts manual and Steve105:{moderator for Alfabb}.

South Africa continued production of the 1750 until 1977 at the Rosslyn assembly plant. A total of 1138 South African (right hand drive) 1750s were assembled and sold in South Africa including 240 first series 1750s.

=== 2000 GT Veloce (1971–1977) ===
Alfa Romeo 2000 GT Veloce
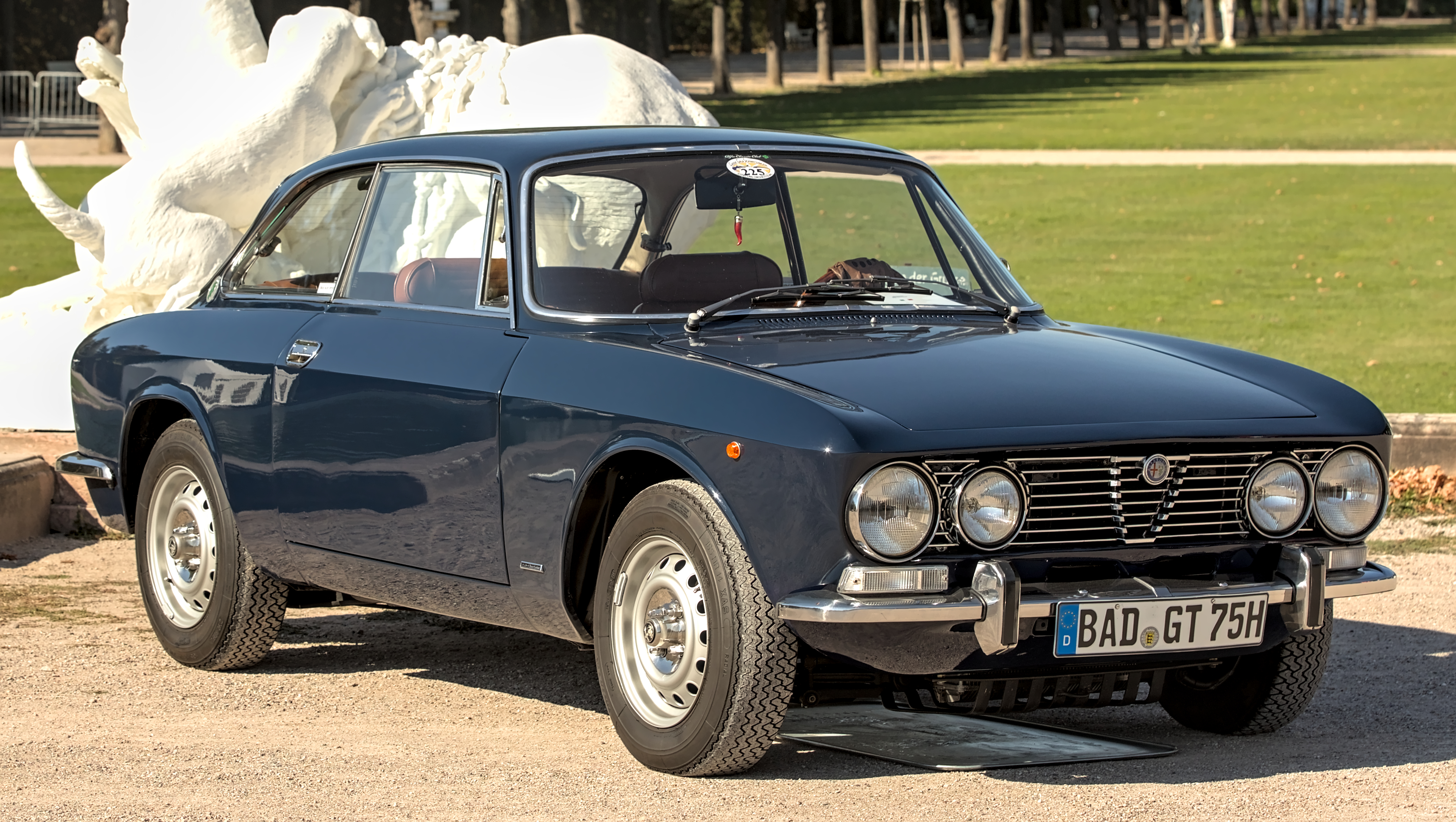

Overview
- Production: 1971–1976

Body and chassis
- Body style: 2-door coupé

Powertrain
- Engine: 2.0 L Twin Cam I4

Dimensions
- Wheelbase: 2,350 mm (92.5 in)
- Length: 4,089 mm (161.0 in)
- Width: 1,575 mm (62.0 in)
- Height: 1,321 mm (52.0 in)
- Kerb weight: 1,028 kg (2,266 lb)

Tipo: 105.21, 105.22 (right hand drive), 115.01 (USA).
Engine: 00512, 01500 (USA).

The Alfa Romeo 2000 GT Veloce (also known as 2000 GTV) was introduced in 1971 together with the 2000 Berlina sedan and 2000 Spider. The 2000 range was the replacement for the 1750 range. Once again the engine was rationalized throughout the range. The engine displacement was increased to 1962 cc with a change of the bore and stroke to 84 mm × 88.5 mm. Oil and radiator capacities remained unchanged. The engine produced 132 PS (97 kW; 130 hp) at 5500 rpm with the SPICA fuel injection, which, once again, was only fitted to cars destined for the United States and Canadian markets, with carburetors retained for other markets producing officially the same power.

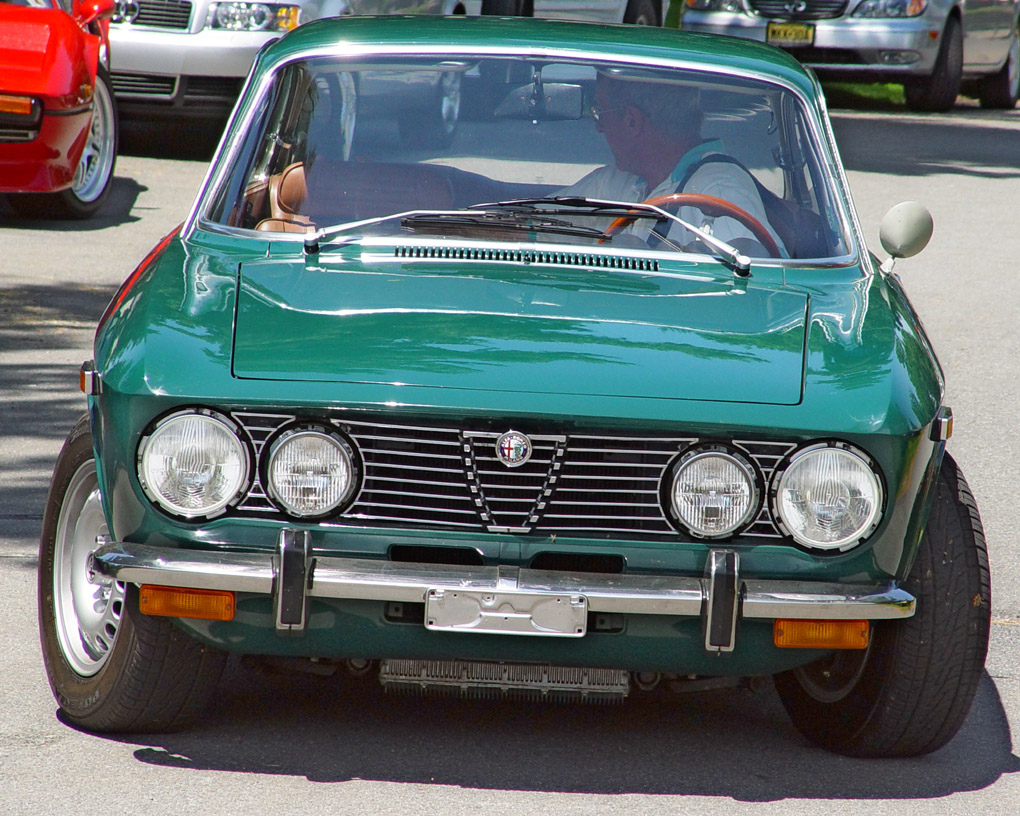
The 2000 GTV is most easily distinguished by its different grille. From 1974 on, this became standard on the GT 1300 Junior and GT 1600 Junior as well.

The interior trim was also changed, with the most notable differences being the introduction of a separate instrument cluster, instead of the gauges installed in the dash panel in earlier cars. Externally the 2000 GTV is most easily distinguished by the following features:

- Grille with horizontal chrome bars, featuring protruding blocks forming the familiar Alfa shield in outline.
- Smaller hubcaps with exposed wheel nuts.
- Optional magnesium alloy wheels manufactured by Cromodora or Campagnolo of the same size as the standard 5. 1/2J × 14 steel items, styled to the "turbina" design first seen on the alloy wheels of the Alfa Romeo Montreal. "Turbina" refers to the wheel's resemblance to a jet engine inlet.
- The larger rear light clusters first fitted to United States market 1750 GTV's were standard for all markets on the 2000 GTV. USA market rear turn signals were red instead of yellow on non-USA models. The side marker lamps were larger and did not have a turn signal flash feature.

From 1974 on, the 105 Series coupé models were rationalized and these external features became common to post-1974 GT 1300 Junior and GT 1600 Junior models, with only few distinguishing features marking the difference between models. The last GTV model year was 1974 for the USA. According to Marco Fazio of Alfa Romeo, the very last 1974 model year USA models were actually produced in early 1975. They could not meet 1975 USA safety and emissions regulations and thus they were brought in as model year 1974 despite carrying 1975 certificates of origin. 37,459 2000 GTVs were made before production ended.

In 1972 FIA rules changed so the 2L GTV could not race with aluminium doors and boot lid in FIA events. Source Alfa Romeo parts manual, FIA documents and Steve105.

Production ceased in 1976, though it continued until 1977 in South Africa at the Rosslyn assembly plant with a further 25 2000 GTV's (all right hand drive).

== GT Junior models ==
=== GT 1300 Junior (1965–1977) ===
Alfa Romeo GT 1300 Junior
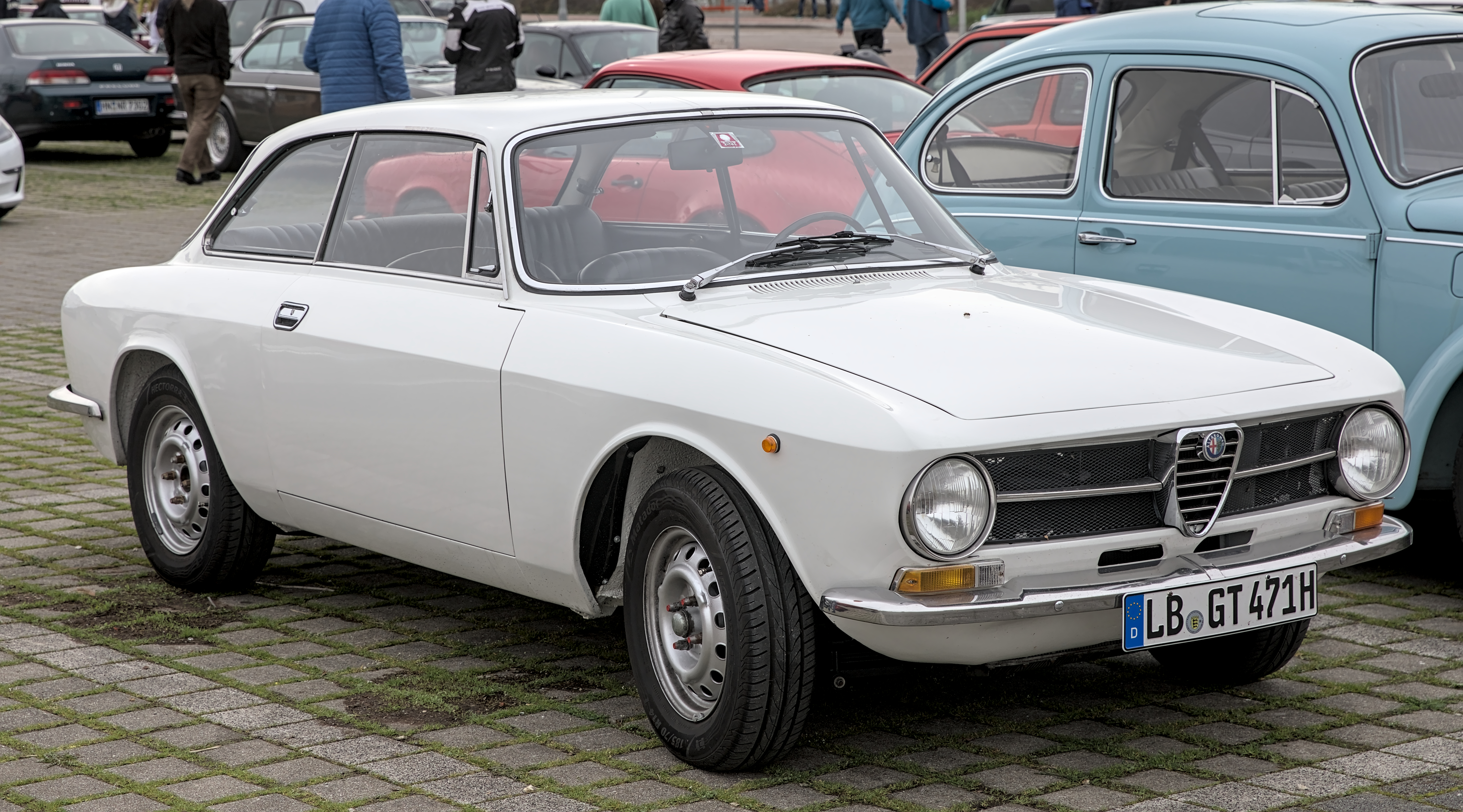
- 1972 GT 1300 Junior

Overview
- Production: 1965–1974 (GT 1300 Junior); 1974–1976 (1.3 GT Junior)

Body and chassis
- Body style: 2-door coupé

Powertrain
- Engine: 1.3 L Twin Cam I4

Dimensions
- Length: 4,080 mm (160.6 in)
- Width: 1,580 mm (62.2 in)
- Height: 1,310 mm (51.6 in)
- Kerb weight: 930 kg (2,050 lb)

Tipo: 105.30, 105.31 (right hand drive).
Engine: 00530 (1965–74), 00530/S (1974 on).

The Alfa Romeo GT 1300 Junior was the entry model to the Alfa Romeo coupé range. It was introduced in 1965 as the replacement for the 101 series Giulia Sprint 1300, which was the final development of the Giulietta Sprint series.

The GT 1300 Junior was fitted with the 1300 (1290 cc) twin cam engine (74 mm bore × 75 mm stroke), as fitted to the Giulietta series cars, but revised for the 105 series with reduced port sizes and other modifications. The smaller engine was introduced in order to allow buyers to choose an Alfa Romeo coupé while avoiding the higher taxes on the models with larger engine capacity, especially in Alfa Romeo's home Italian market.

The performance was low-end compared to others in its model line, with a total of 89 bhp (66 kW; 90 PS). However, the GT 1300 Junior's top speed of over 100 mph and 0–60 mph time of 12.6 seconds were very good for a fully appointed coupé with an engine of only 1300 cc displacement.

The GT 1300 Junior was in production for over a decade. Throughout this period it was updated by the factory, incorporating many of the same revisions applied to the larger-engined models.

The first GT 1300 Juniors produced were based on the Giulia Sprint GT, with a simpler interior. The major external identifying feature was the black grille with just one horizontal chrome bar. The same 9/41 final drive ratio was maintained, but with a shorter 5th gear ratio of 0.85, instead of 0.79 as on all the other 105 Series coupés.

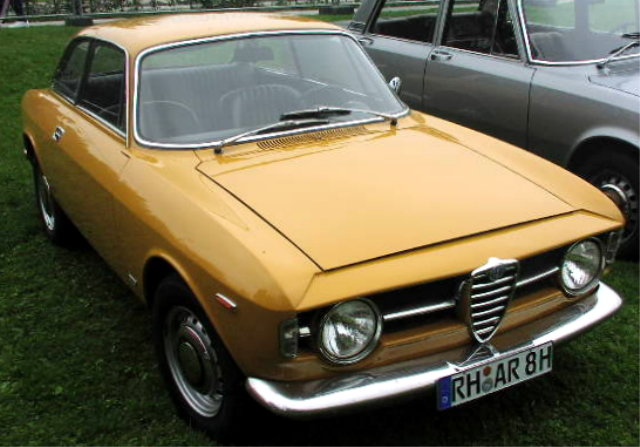
1968 GT 1300 Junior

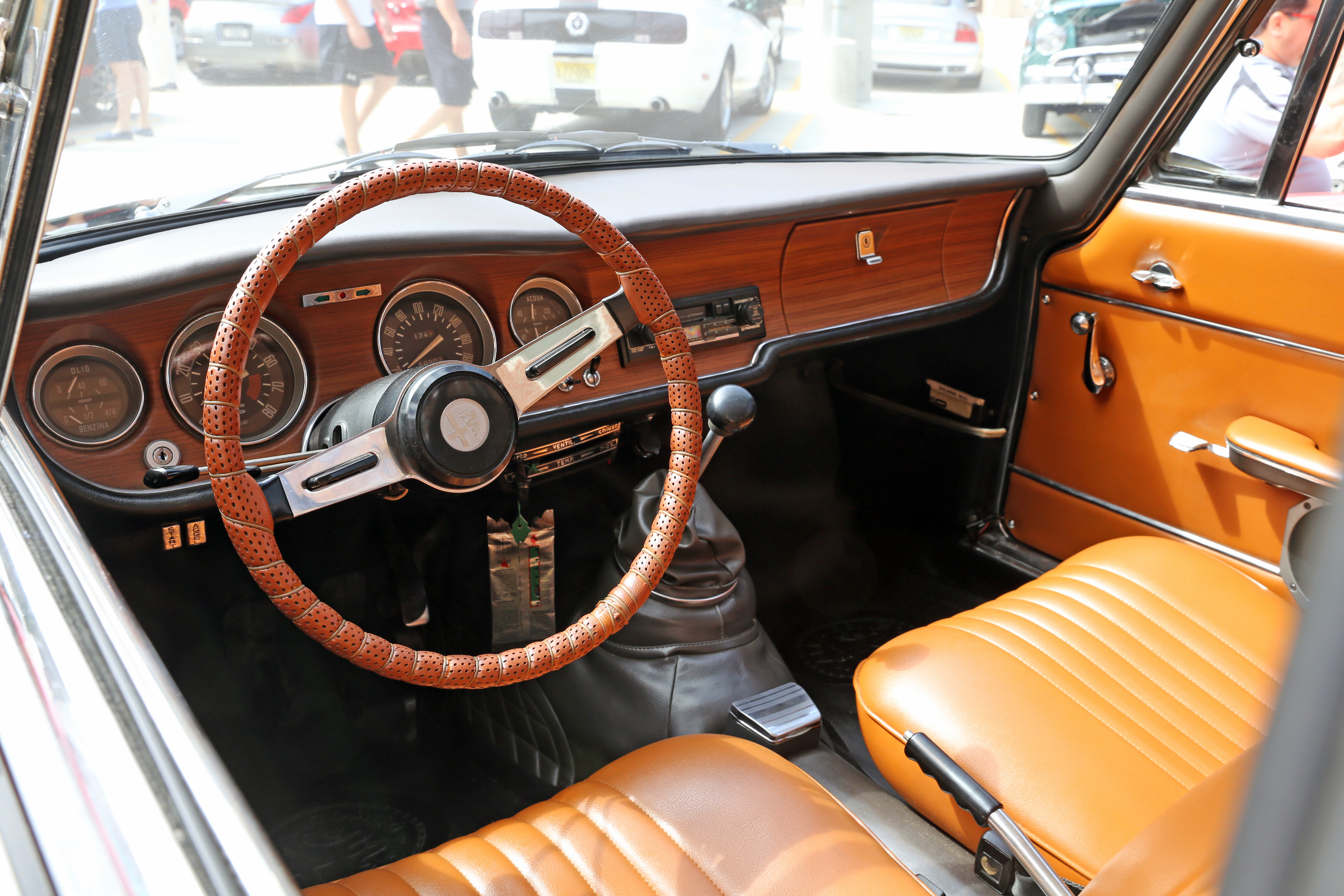
Interior of a 1965–1968 GT 1300 Junior

Together with the Giulia 1300 Ti, the GT 1300 Junior pioneered the use of ATE disc brakes as later fitted throughout the 105 series, replacing the Dunlop discs on earlier cars. The first few GT 1300 Juniors lacked a brake servo, and had the low rear wheelarches of the Giulia Sprint GT and Giulia Sprint GTV. From 1967, a servo was fitted as standard, together with higher rear wheelarches as adopted later on the 1750 GTV.

There were two versions of the ATE brakes: The first version consisted of an ATE adapter 105.14.22.103.03/04 on Dunlop front uprights (105.14.21.010.00,105.14.21.011.00) using an ATE caliper also optioned on the GT Veloce 1600 in 1967 (on 1000 cars as per group 2, FIA). The second version consisted of one piece ATE uprights 105.14.21.010.03, 105.14.21.011.03 with no adapter plate using an ATE caliper. Fusi's book on page 846 lists 340 RHD GT 1300 Juniors were made in 1972. Record exist on the Classic Alfa Romeo register of a RHD GT 1300 Junior which was made and delivered to the UK in 1972 AR 1296169. The 1300 GTj could not race under FIA rules with aluminium doors and boot lid. Source FIA documents, Alfa Romeo parts manual, Fusi's book and Steve105.

In 1968, concurrently with the replacement of the Giulia Sprint GT Veloce by the 1750 GTV, the GT 1300 Junior was revised with many of the new parts from the 1750 GTV. This included the dashboard, the suspension and the new wheel size of 5½ × 14J instead of 4½ × 15J. This revised GT 1300 Junior, however, retained the early "step-front" body style, which makes it the most mechanically refined production "step-front" model. Another intriguing detail is that, just as on the 1750 GTV, the remote release for the boot (trunk) lid, located on the inside of the door opening on the B-post just under the door lock striker, was moved from the right hand side of the car to the left hand side. The location of this item was always independent of whether the car was left hand drive or right hand drive. This series of GT 1300 Junior was the only model with the step-front bodyshell to have this item mounted on the left hand side. All other step-front models - Giulia Sprint GT, Giulia Sprint GT Veloce, and early GT 1300 Junior with flat dashboard - featured this item on the right hand side.

In 1968 the RHD GT 1300 Juniors still retained their flat top dash.

From 1968 onward, Alfa Romeo models for the US market were fitted with fuel injection systems instead of carburetors to comply with emissions control legislation. The only 105 Series models in which the classic twin-cam engine was fitted with fuel injection were the US market 1750 range, and the US market 2000 range which replaced the 1750s in mid-1972. No 105/115 series coupe models with 1300 or 1600cc engines were ever made with fuel injection.

In 1970 the Junior was revised a second time, and received the same nose treatment as the 1750 GTV, without the step but with only two headlights.

For 1972, new wheels featuring smaller hubcaps with exposed wheel nuts like those on the 2000 GTV were fitted. At the same time, the GT 1600 Junior was introduced alongside the GT 1300 Junior. The GT 1300 Junior was discontinued for the right hand drive UK market but continued to be available in other right hand drive markets.

From 1974 the GT1300 Junior and GT1600 Junior were both rationalised into a common range with the 2000 GTV and were rebadged as 1.3 GT Junior and 1.6 GT Junior. See below.

=== GT 1600 Junior (1972–1976) ===
Alfa Romeo GT 1600 Junior
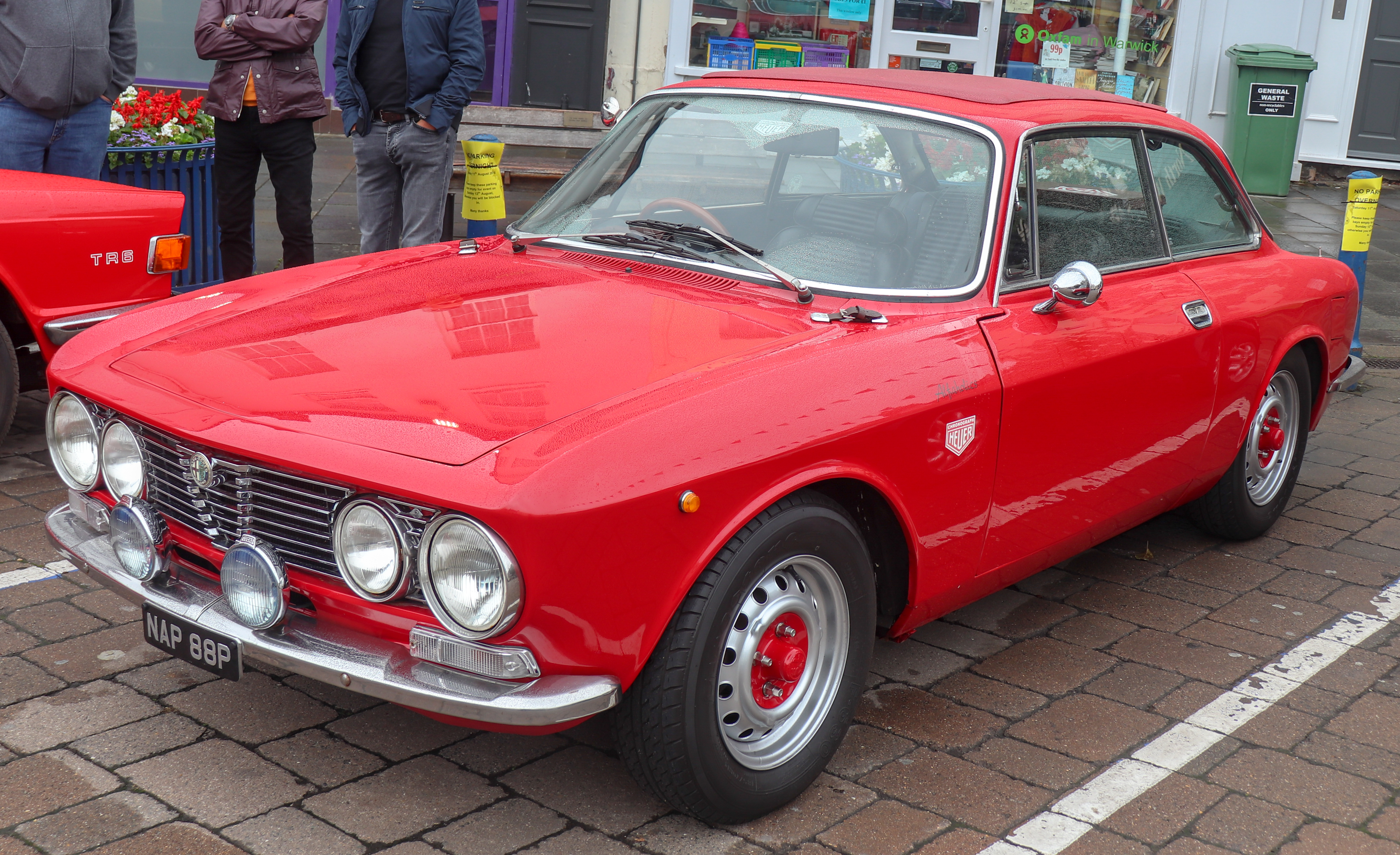
- 1976 GT 1600 Junior.

Overview
- Production: 1972–1975 (GT 1600 Junior); 1974–1976 (1.6 GT Junior)

Body and chassis
- Body style: 2-door coupé

Powertrain
- Engine: 1.6 L Twin Cam I4

Tipo: 115.03 (1972–74), 105.05 (right hand drive), 115.34 (1974 on).
Engine: 00536 (1972–74), 00526/AS (1974 on).

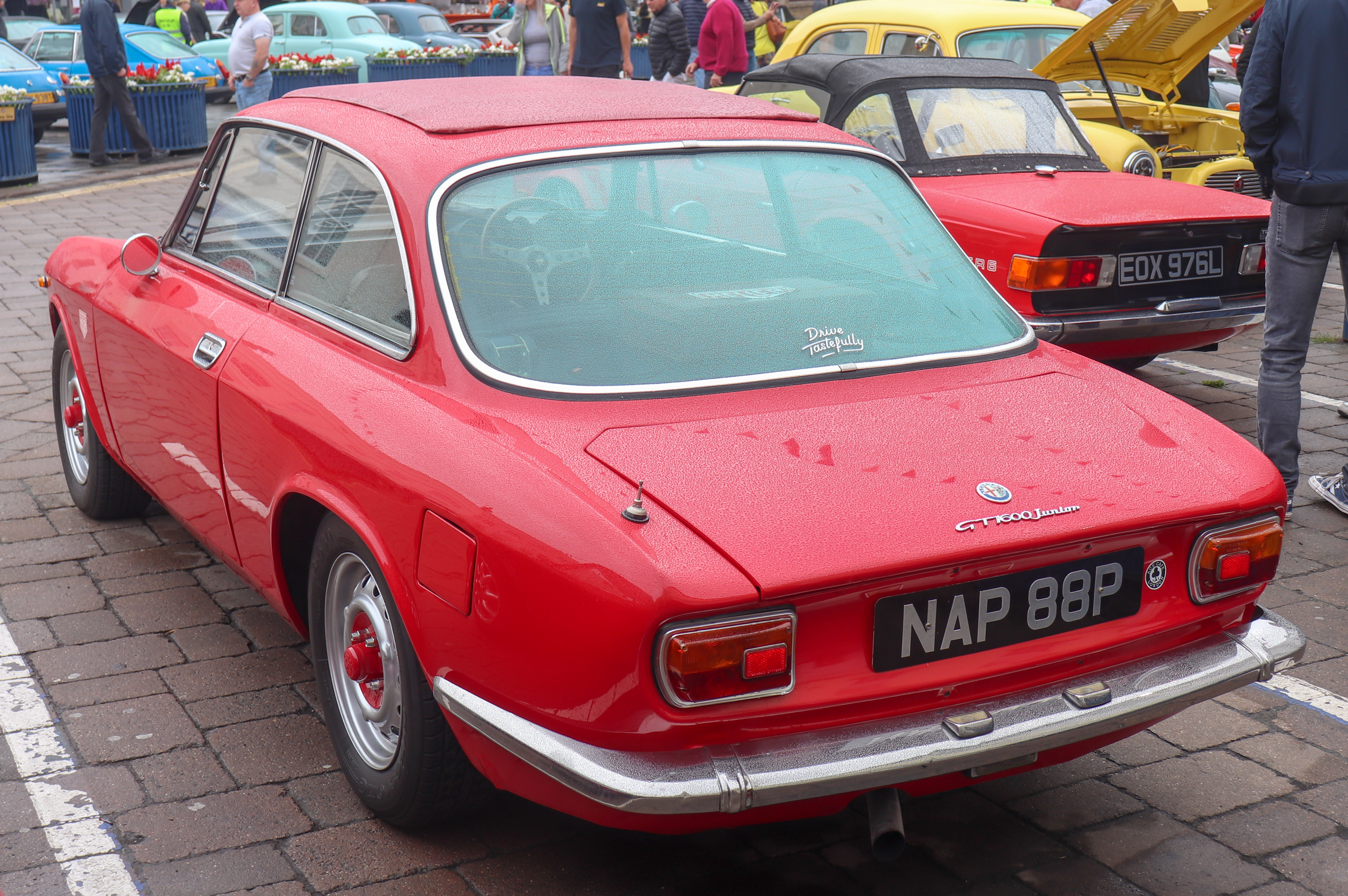
Alfa Romeo GT 1600 Junior

The Alfa Romeo GT 1600 Junior was introduced in 1972, to plug the gap between the GT 1300 Junior and the larger-engined 2000 GTV. In the UK right-hand-drive market the GT 1300 Junior was dropped, but in many other markers the two models were available as a range. The engine was substantially the same as that of the Giulia Sprint GTV discontinued four years previously, and had the same engine type number. The final drive ratio was again 9/41 as standard on all 105 Series coupés with the 1290 cc and 1570 cc engine.

Record exist on the Classic Alfa Romeo register of a RHD GT 1300 Junior which was made and delivered to the UK in 1972 AR 1296169.

From 1974 on, the GT 1300 Junior and GT 1600 Junior were rationalised into a common range of models with the 2000 GTV and were rebadged as 1.3 GT Junior and 1.6 GT Junior, sharing most of the interior and exterior features with the larger-engined car. The only exterior differences were no bumper over-riders, lack of C-pillar green serpent badges, small rear light clusters same as pre-'74 Juniors and GT 1300 Junior or GT 1600 Junior badge on the boot. Apart from the engine size, the only mechanical differences were: smaller front brakes, as the Juniors had not adopted the larger units fitted to the 1750 GTV and 2000 GTV from 1968 on, differential ratios (Junior models 4.55:1, 2000 GTV 4.1:1) and 5th gear ratio (GT 1300 Junior 0.85:1, all other Alfa Romeo 105 models 0.79:1).

The GT Junior has a tight suspension and weighed in at just 2,050 pounds (930 kg) for the 1.3 variant. Because of this, the car would often go onto three wheels, lifting the inside front wheel off the road when driven enthusiastically.

Production ended in 1976–77 and totalled 91,964 units of 1.3 lt. Juniors and 13,120 units of the 1.6 lt. Juniors.

=== Junior Z (1969–1972) and 1600 Junior Z (1972–1975) ===
Alfa Romeo Junior Z Alfa Romeo 1600 Junior Z
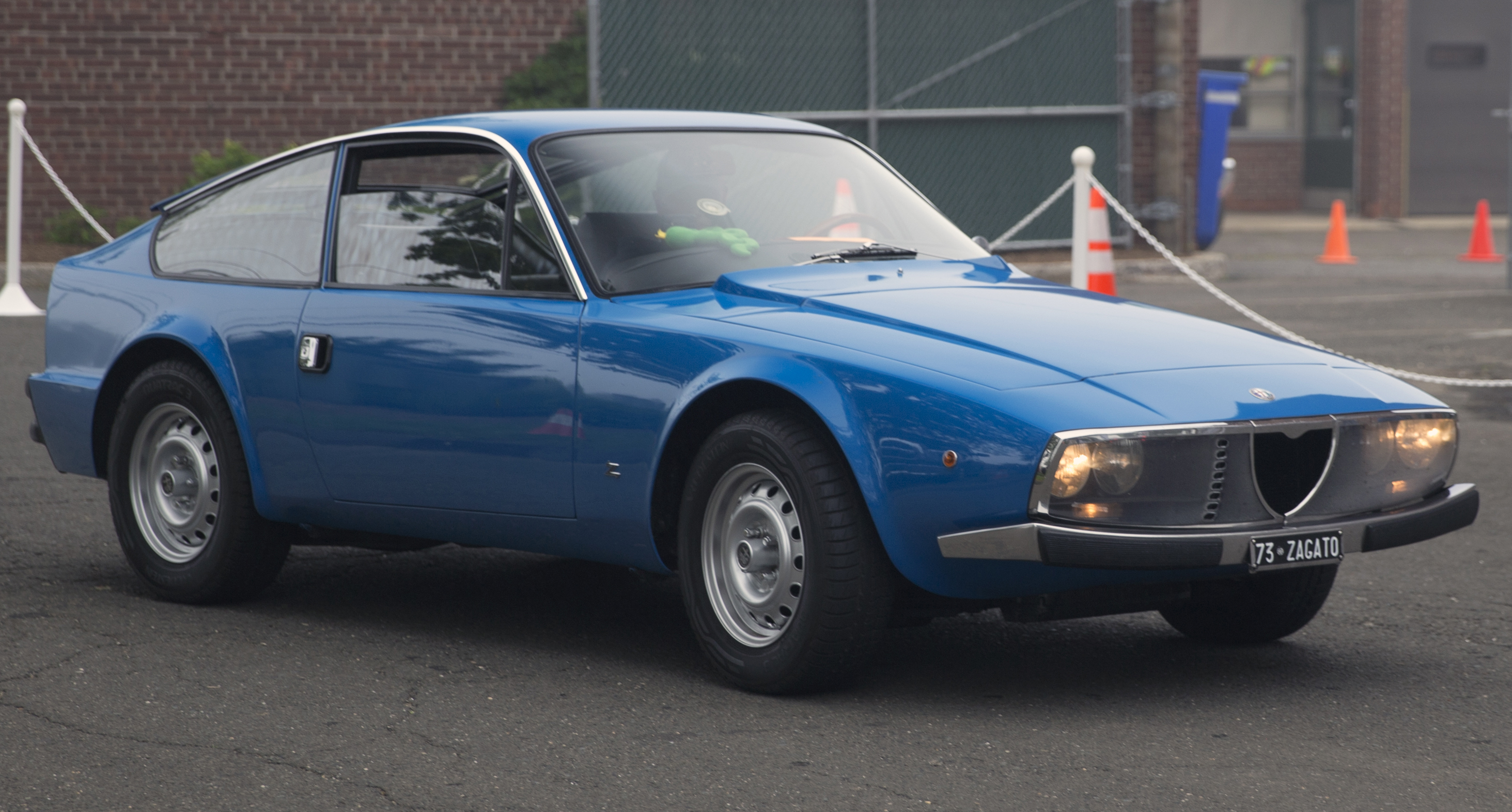
- Alfa Romeo 1600 Junior Z

Overview
- Production: Junior Z: 1969–1972; 1600 Junior Z: 1972–1975
- Designer: Ercole Spada at Zagato

Body and chassis
- Body style: 2-door coupé

Powertrain
- Engine: Junior Z: 1.3 L Twin Cam I4; 1600 Junior Z: 1.6 L Twin Cam I4
- Transmission: 5-speed manual

Dimensions
- Wheelbase: 2,250 mm (88.6 in)
- Length: Junior Z: 3,900 mm (153.5 in) (Junior Z); 1600 Junior Z: 4,000 mm (157.5 in)
- Width: 1,550 mm (61.0 in)
- Height: 1,280 mm (50.4 in)
- Kerb weight: Junior Z: 920 kg (2,028 lb); 950 kg (2,094 lb) (1600 Junior Z)

Tipo: 105.93 (Junior Z), 115.24 (1600 Junior Z).
Engine: 00530 (Junior Z), 00536.S (1600 Junior Z).

The Alfa Romeo Junior Z is a limited production two-seater coupé with aerodynamic bodywork by Zagato of Milan. The kamm tail wedge-shaped body was designed by Ercole Spada at Zagato. The rear boot lid could be opened a crack (electrically operated) so as to aid in cabin ventilation. The Junior Z was introduced at the 51st Turin Motor Show in November 1969. Unlike Zagato's earlier, race-oriented and aluminium-bodied Giulietta SZ which had a very active competition history, the Junior Z was not specifically intended for racing and did not see much use in competition.

The Junior Z had a steel bodyshell with an aluminium bonnet and, on the earlier Junior Z, aluminium doorskins. The car was based on the floorpan, driveline and suspension of the Alfa Romeo Spider 1300 Junior. The platform was manufactured at Pininfarina factory and transferred to the coachbuilder Maggiora to be bodied, and then sent to Zagato. However the floorpan was shortened behind the rear wheels to fit the short rear overhang of the Zagato bodywork. The engine was the same 1290 cc twin cam with two twin-choke carburettors of the GT 1300 Junior and Spider 1300 Junior. It produced 89 PS DIN (65 kW; 88 hp) or 103 PS SAE at 6000 rpm, giving the car a top speed of 175 kilometres per hour (109 mph). In the cabin driver and passenger were seated in highly bolstered bucket seats with incorporated headrests. Two large round instruments, tachometer and speedometer, faced the driver; three more auxiliary gauges were in the middle of the Zagato-designed dashboard. The steering wheel was the same two-spoke, plastic rimmed one of the other Junior models.

In total 1,117 examples were built, of which 2 bodyshells were destroyed during production because they were not within specification. Production of the Junior Z continued through 1972, and was replaced by the 1.6-litre 1600 Junior Z at the end of the year; although according to the records two more 1.3-litre cars were completed in 1972.

The 1600 Junior Z was launched at the 54th Turin Motor Show in November 1972. In this case the car was based on the unaltered floorpan of the 1600 Spider, so that the standard sized fuel tank could be left in place. As a consequence, at 4 metres long the 1600 Junior Z measured 100 mm (3.9 in) more than the 1300. This can be seen at the back where the sloping roofline runs further back and the back panel is different and lower. The lower part of the rear bumper features a bulge to make room for the spare tire. The 1570 cc engine with two twin-choke carburettors had an output 109 PS DIN (80 kW; 108 hp) or 125 PS SAE at 6000 rpm. Top speed rose to 190 kilometres per hour (118 mph).

Besides the longer tail, a number of exterior details distinguished the 1600 Junior Z from the previous model: the arched front bumper was bulkier, the fuel filler was moved to the left hand side, the tail lights were larger items sourced from the 2000 Berlina, the door handles had black plastic housings, and the exhaust pipe was down turned. Badging on the tail now read "1600 Z" instead of "Junior Z". Inside the steering wheel was now a wood rimmed one, with horn buttons through the three metal spokes. In total, 402 examples of the 1600 were made, the last one being produced in 1973; the cars were then sold until 1975.

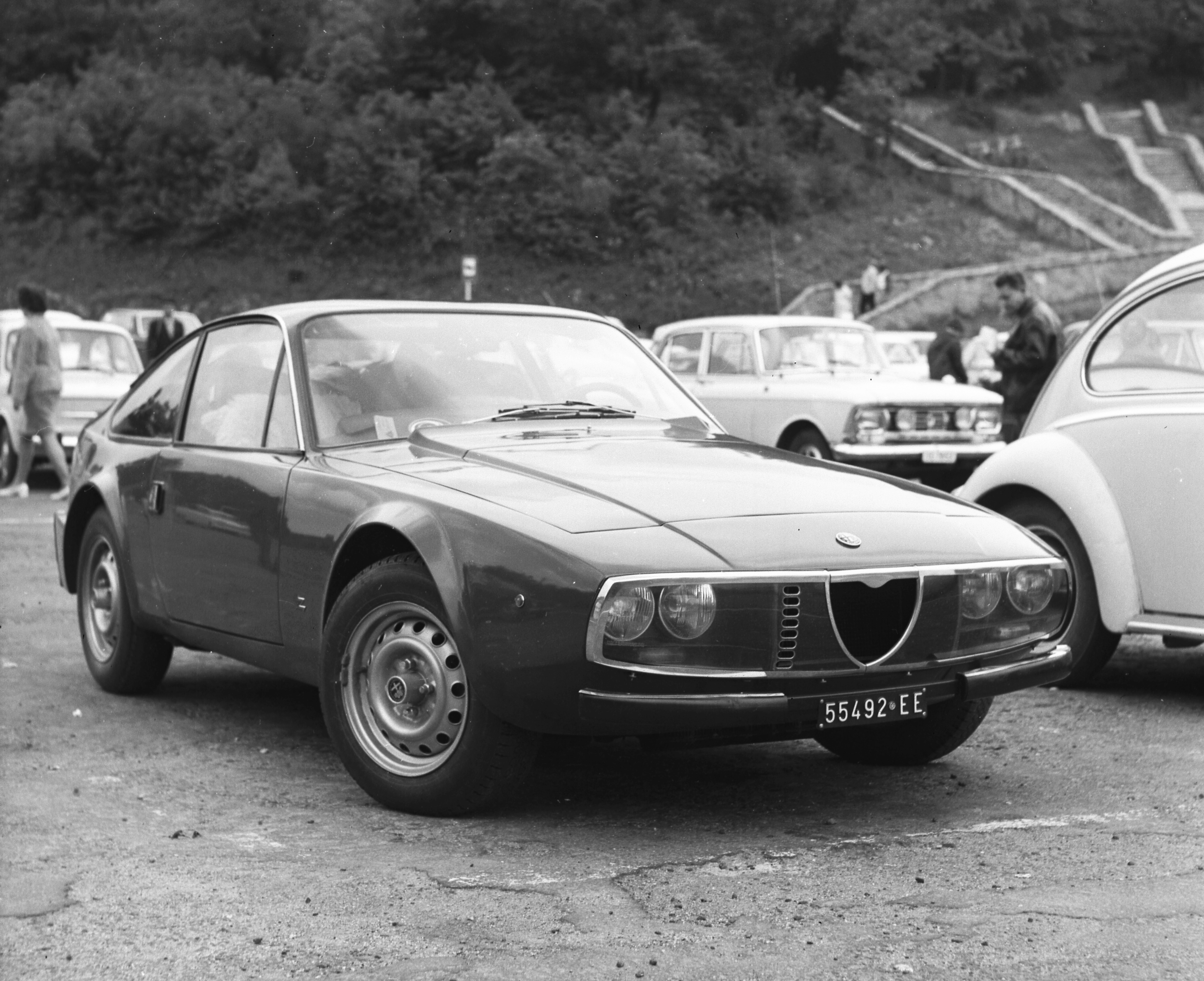
Alfa Romeo Junior Z

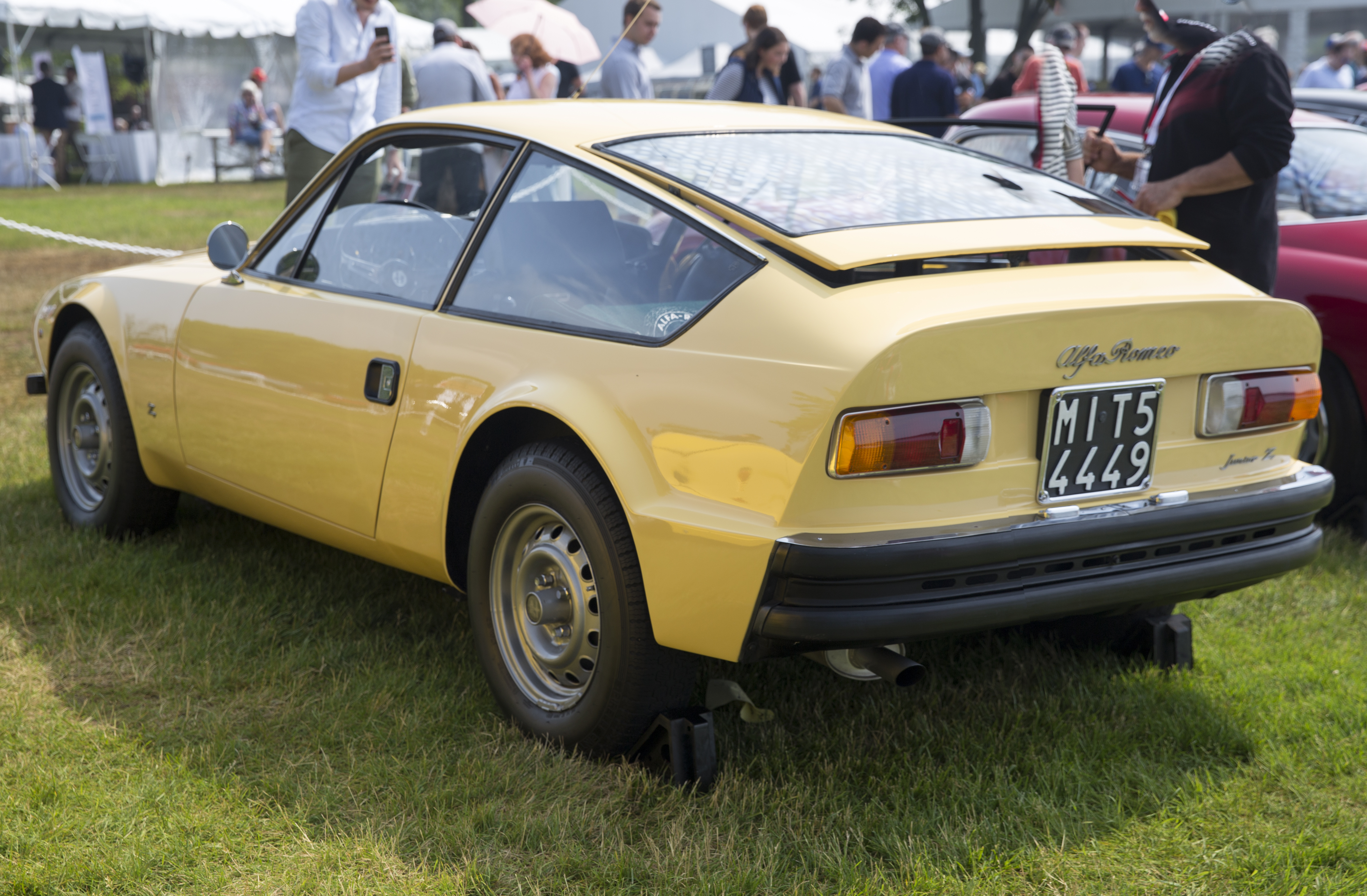
Junior Z (1970)

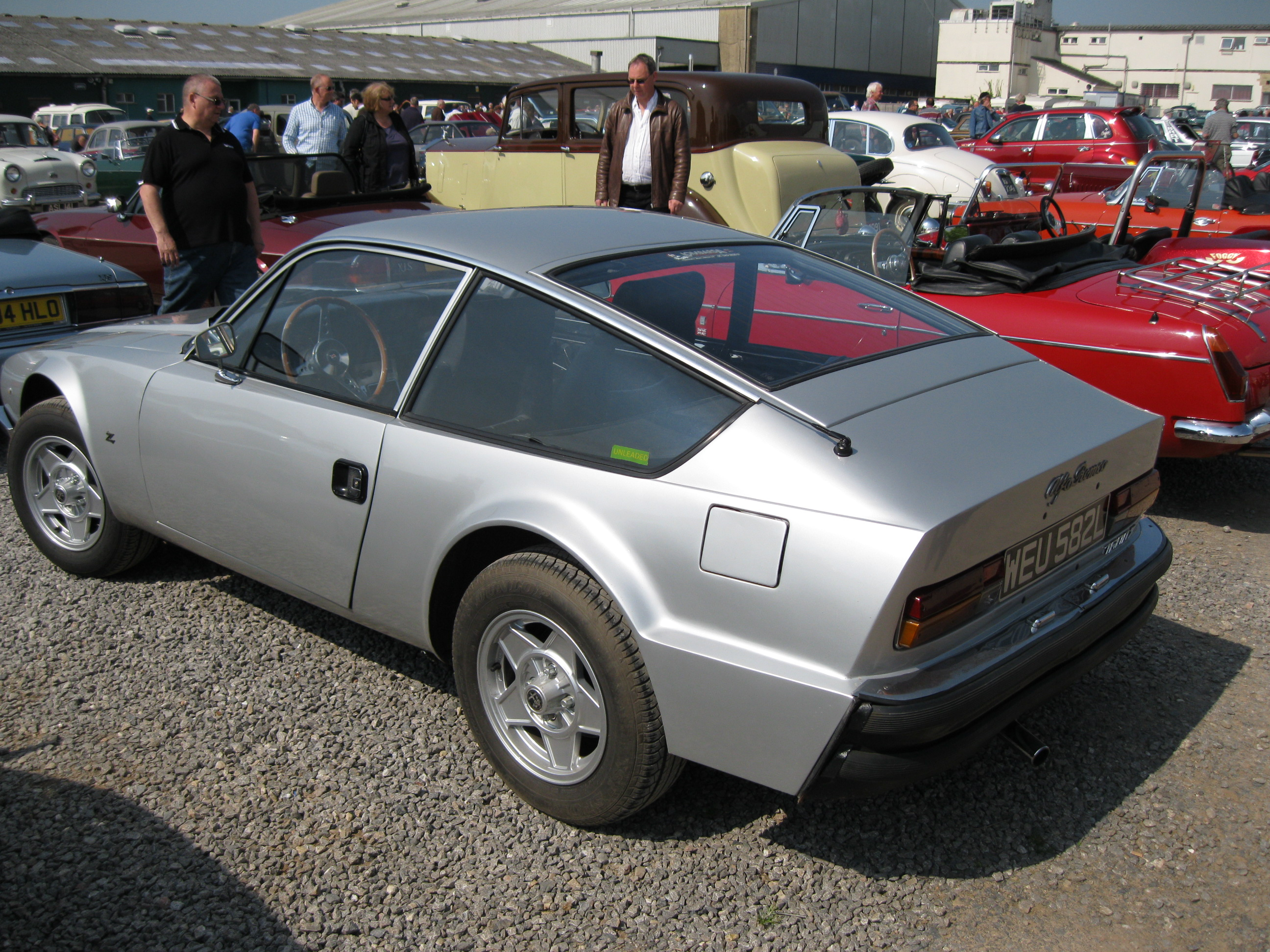
1600 Junior Z

== GTA models ==
=== Giulia Sprint GTA (1965–1969) ===
Tipo: 105.32 (Alfa Romeo), 105.02/A (IGM homologation), 105.34 (right hand drive).
Engine: 00502/A or 00532/A (identical save for no. prefix.).

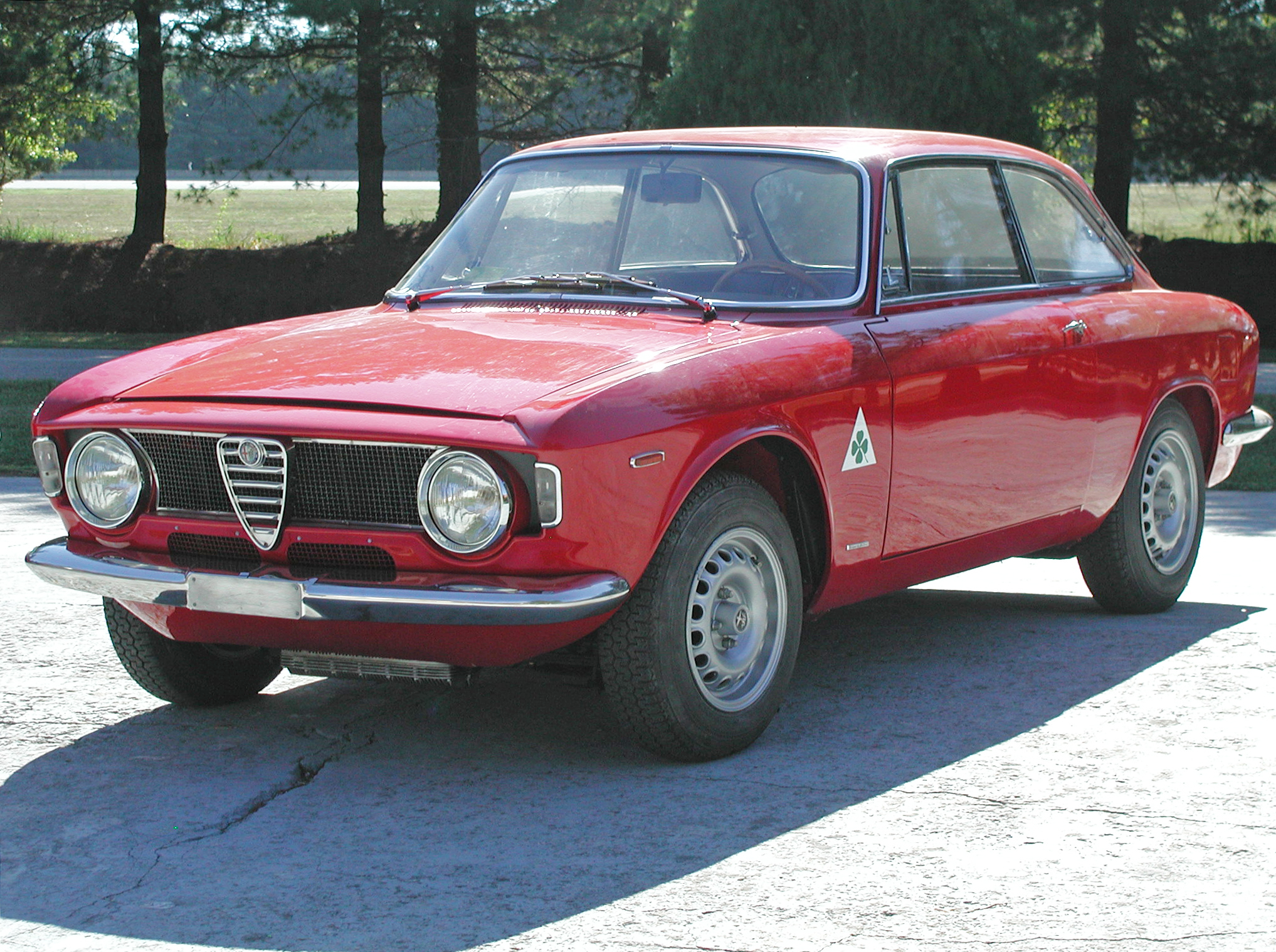
Giulia Sprint GTA, factory standard

The Alfa Romeo GTA retained the external form of the Giulia Sprint GT, but was constructed with aluminium external panels replacing the standard steel panels. The 'A' stood for "Alleggerita", Italian for "lightened". The engine was based on that of the standard 1600 cc car with a new, twin-plug head and Weber 45DCOE carburettors. The sump, camshaft cover, timing cover and clutch housing were in lightweight magnesium alloy instead of the standard aluminium alloy. Many other measures were also taken to lighten the car, and tune it for racing. All GTA's had the lower rear wheelarches as fitted to the Giulia Sprint GT's and GTV's, and very early GT 1300 Juniors. The GTA was available from the factory as a high-performance car for the road or racing. Unmodified cars in factory trim have come to be known as "GTA Stradale" but few were sold in this form. Most customers were racers and had them further modified and tuned before delivery by Autodelta, which had become a wholly owned Alfa Romeo subsidiary running its competition department.

=== GTA 1300 Junior (1968–1975) ===
Tipo: 105.59. Engine: 00559.

The Alfa Romeo GTA 1300 Junior (Tipo 105.59) was based on the early step-front GT 1300 Junior, incorporating the same modifications as the GTA. Its engine was not based on the standard 1300 cc motor but was instead based on the 1600cc GTA engine with the same bore but a shorter stroke (67.5 instead of 82 mm). Unlike the GTA, the GTA 1300 Junior featured the higher rear wheelarches as first seen on the GT 1300 Junior and later adopted for the 1750 GTV. Once again the GTA 1300 Junior was available as a standard car from Alfa Romeo, but most were modified by Autodelta for racing before delivery. Production of the GTAJ continued through 1975.

=== GTAm ===
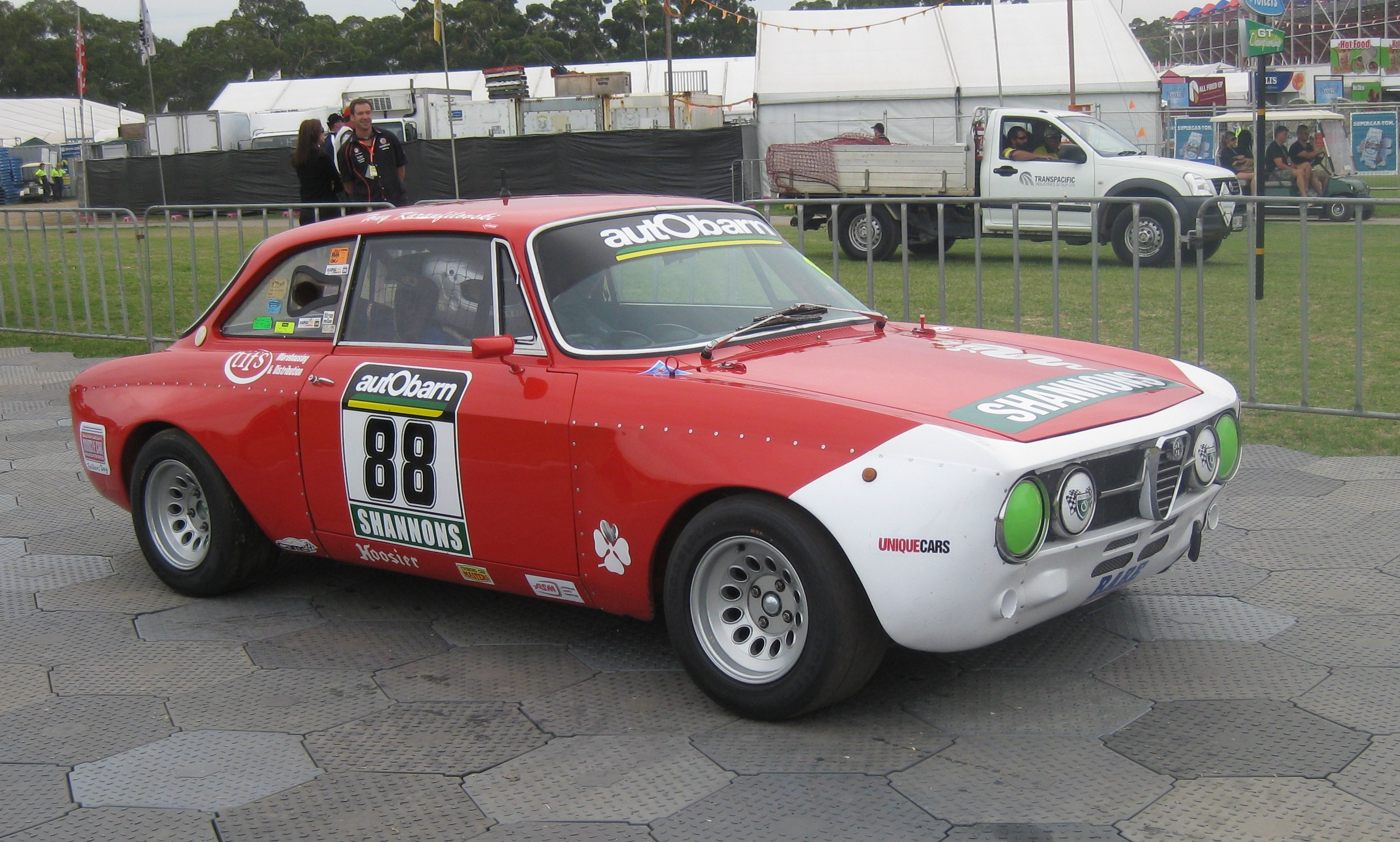
Alfa Romeo GTAm

The Alfa Romeo 1750 GTAm (later called 2000 GTAm when the 2000 GTV was introduced) appeared in 1969. Unlike the Giulia Sprint GTA and GTA 1300 Junior, The GTAm was not built by Alfa Romeo, was never available from the factory and was never issued its own Tipo number. There have been two schools of thought about the origin of the "Am" moniker, one explaining Am as standing for "Alleggerita maggiorata" (Italian: lightened enlarged, referring to the lightened body and enlarged cylinder capacity) and the other as standing for "America". Marco Fazio of the Alfa Romeo Documentazione Storico confirmed on the Spettacolo Sportivo in September 2011 that "America" is the official type name.

The GTAm was initially built by Autodelta and was based on the US version of the 1750 GTV (Tipo 105.51) which was fitted with a SPICA mechanical fuel injection system to meet US emissions regulations. The GTAm used the extra full-throttle power which the injection system could develop for racing. Some GTAm's were converted from European-spec carburettor-induction 1750 GTV's (Tipo 105.44) and retrofitted with the injection system. The chassis are therefore numbered randomly from the ranges assigned to Tipo 105.51 and Tipo 105.44 cars (the chassis numbers do not start with 105.51 or 105.44; the chassis numbers were separate from the Tipo numbers in the 105 and 115 series Alfas). The customer had to either buy a 1750 GTV at the factory or use an existing car. The car would be shipped to Autodelta to be converted to a GTAm (which was available in various levels of tune to suit various rules and classes of competition).

Besides the cars built by Autodelta, some racing teams and private workshops ordered parts from Autodelta and other tuners and assembled the cars themselves on a new or existing bodyshell. Because of this, and of the lack of a specific chassis number series, the total number of GTAm's built is difficult to verify. According to sources, a total of some 40 were built by Autodelta and other racing workshops.

As in the GTA and GTA 1300 Junior, the engine had a special cylinder head with twin spark plugs per cylinder in contrast to the standard car's single plugs, but this time the head was to a new design having a much smaller included angle between the valves than in previous Alfa engines. The original 1750 engine block was used, and by inserting a monosleeve instead of four individual cylinder liners, the capacity was enlarged from the standard 1779 cc to 1985 cc and later to 1999 cc. The GTAm (1969–1971) could produce up to 240 PS (177 kW; 237 hp).

Unlike the GTA and GTA Junior, in which all the outer body panels were made of aluminium alloy instead of the standard car's steel, the GTAm retained the standard steel body modified with some aluminium and/or plastic parts. Because of an increased minimum weight in 1971 (up from 920 to 940 kg), the GTAm's had less need for lightweight body parts.

For a clearer understanding of how the GTAm was built you need to check the competition rules in the period the GTAm raced, i.e. the FIA rules for 1970/71/72 plus homologation FIA 1576 Group 2 document. The twin spark engine for the GTAm was first homologated using FIA 1576 G2 variation 3/2V 1st Jan 1970. In 1972 FIA rules changed and the GTAm could not race with aluminium doors and boot lid in FIA events.
