= 2014 Shannons Nationals Motor Racing Championships season =

Australian motor racing season

2014 Shannons Nationals Motor Racing Championships

Seasons
- ← 2013 2015 →

The 2014 Shannons Nationals Motor Racing Championships season was the ninth time that the Shannons Nationals Motor Racing Championships were held. The season began 28 March 2014 at Sandown Raceway and finished on 2 November 2014 at Sydney Motorsport Park.

A total of 14 different series held race weekends as part of the Shannons Nationals Motor Racing Championships. Of these, the 2014 seasons of the Australian Manufacturers' Championship, the Australian Production Car Championship, the Australian Saloon Car Series, the Australian Superkart Championship, the Australian Sports Racer Series, the Kerrick Sports Sedan Series and the Kumho V8 Touring Car Series were all held exclusively on the Shannons Nationals calendar. Rounds of the Australian Carrera Cup Championship, the Australian Drivers' Championship, the Australian Formula Ford Series, the Australian GT Championship, the Porsche GT3 Cup Challenge Australia, the PRB Motorsport Series and the Radical Australia Cup were also part of the Shannons Nationals schedule.

== Calendar and round winners ==
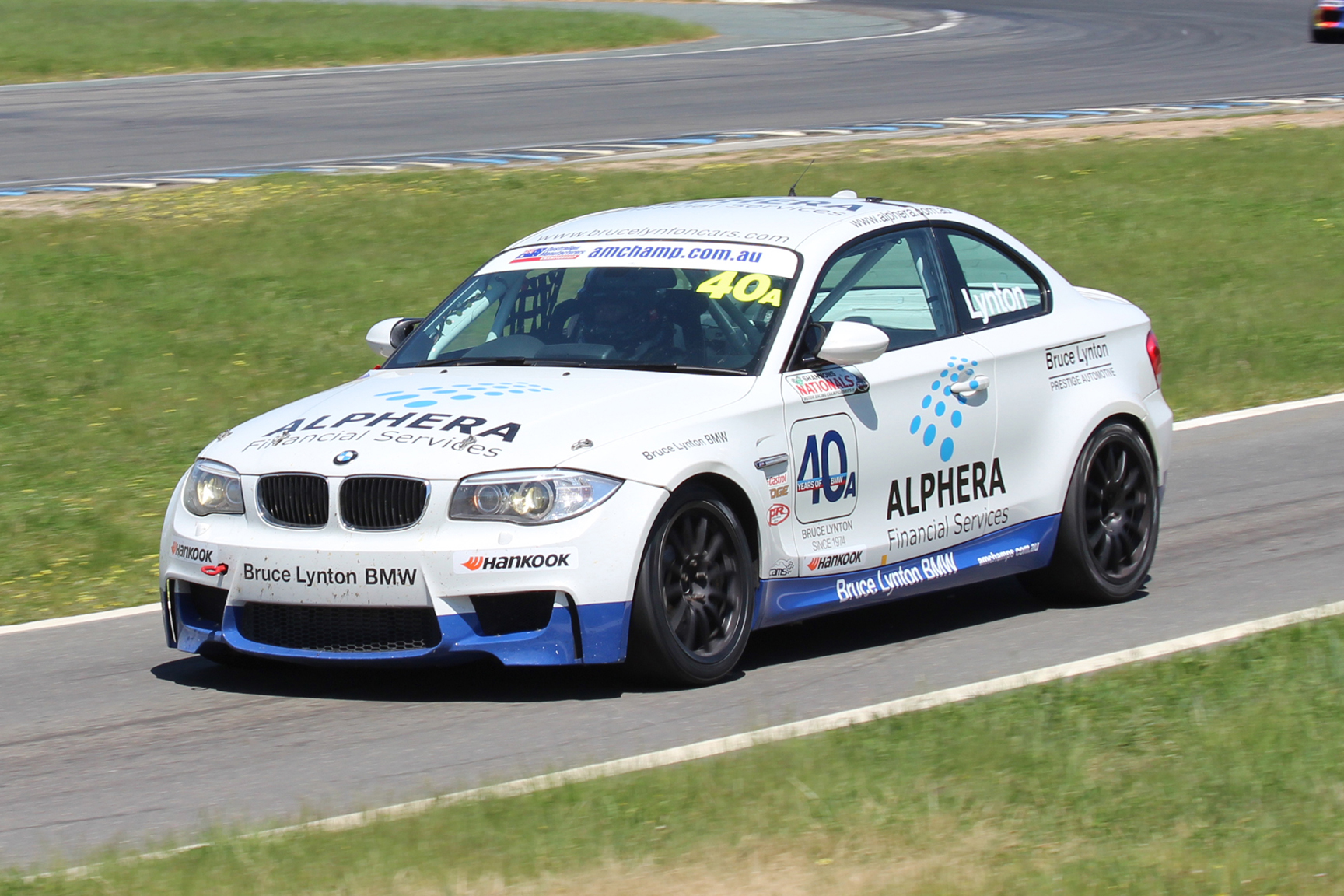
Australian Production Car champion Beric Lynton, driving for Manufacturers' champion BMW.

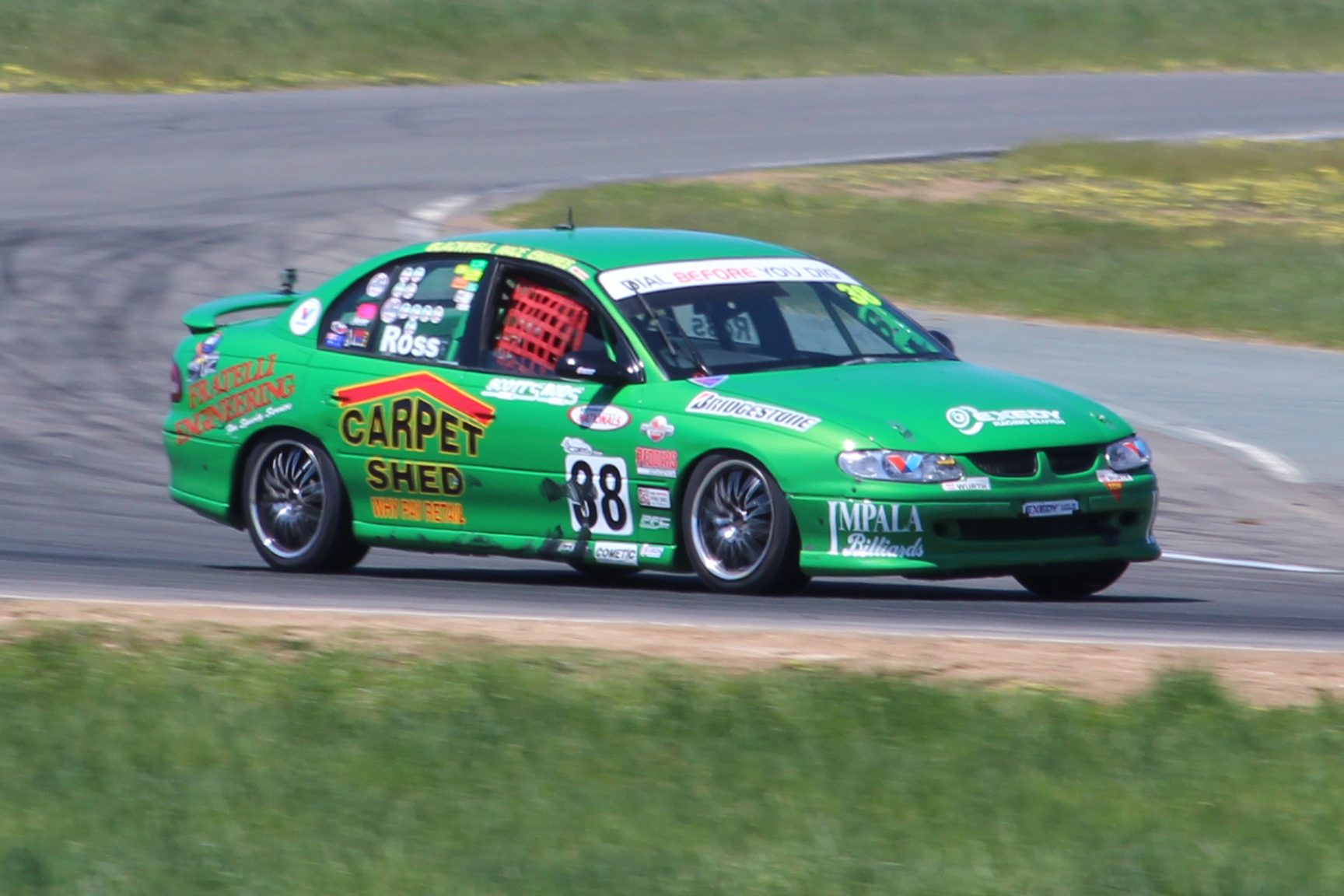
Australian Saloon Car champion Gavin Ross.

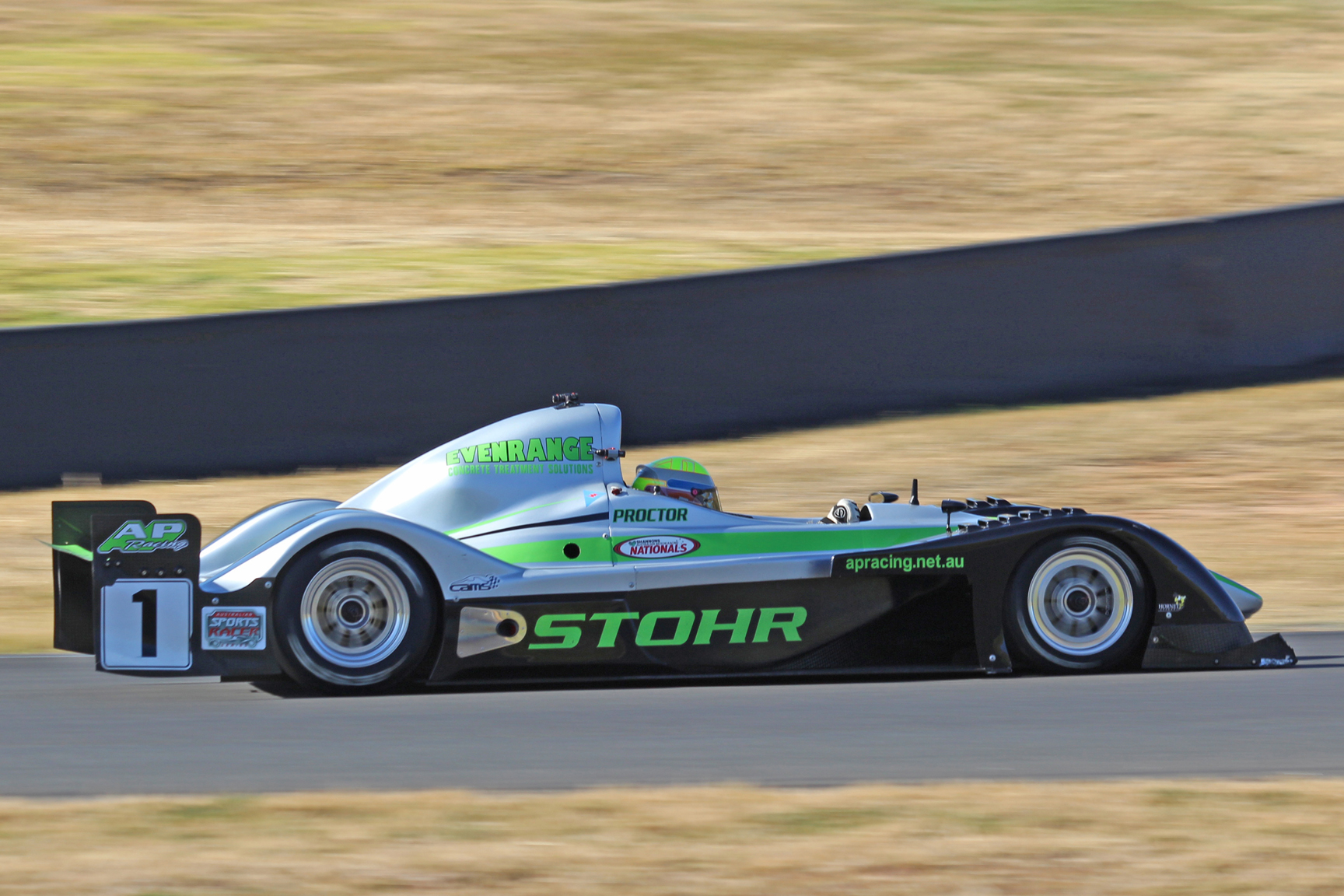
Australian Sports Racer champion Adam Proctor.

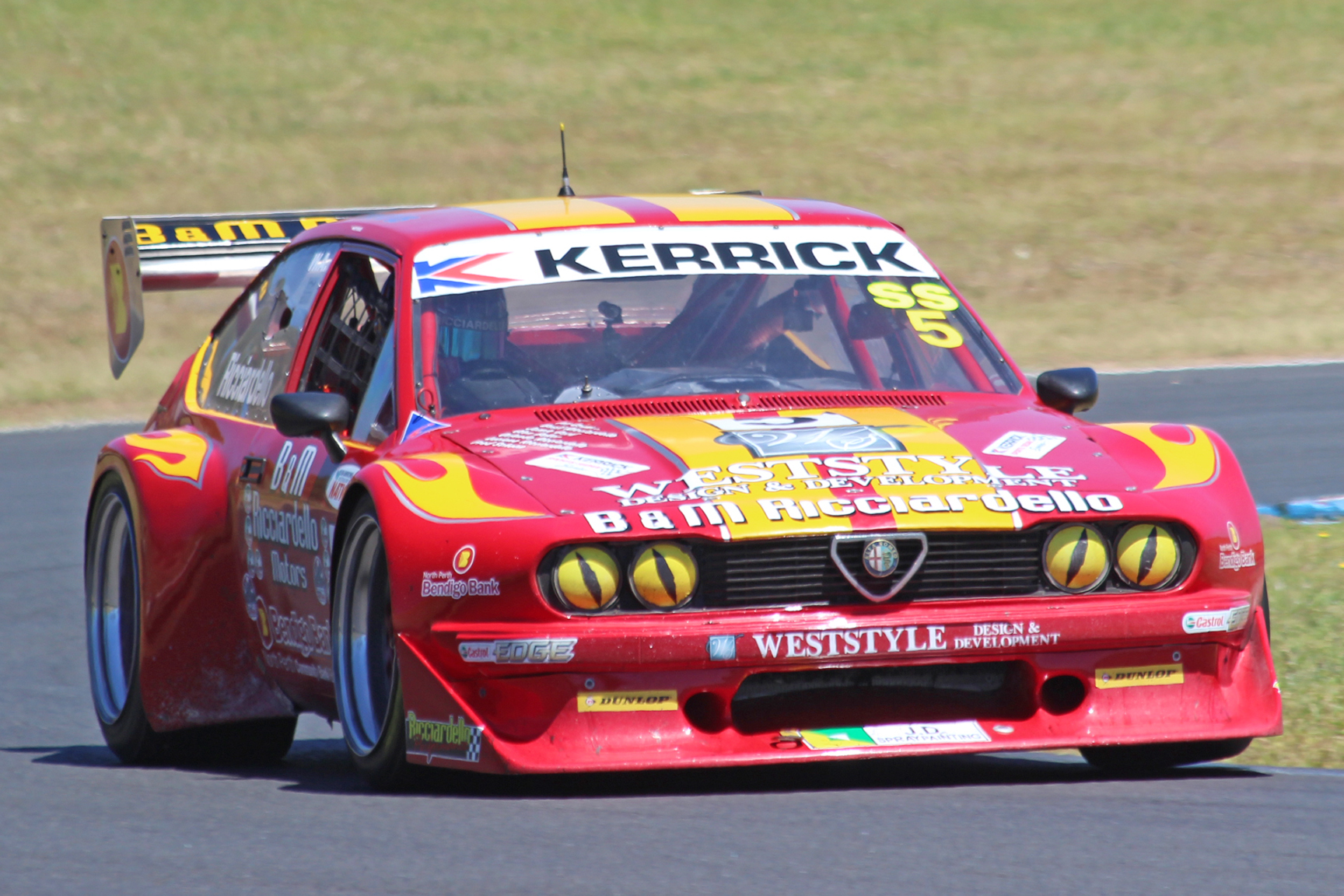
Kerrick Sports Sedan Series winner Tony Ricciardello.

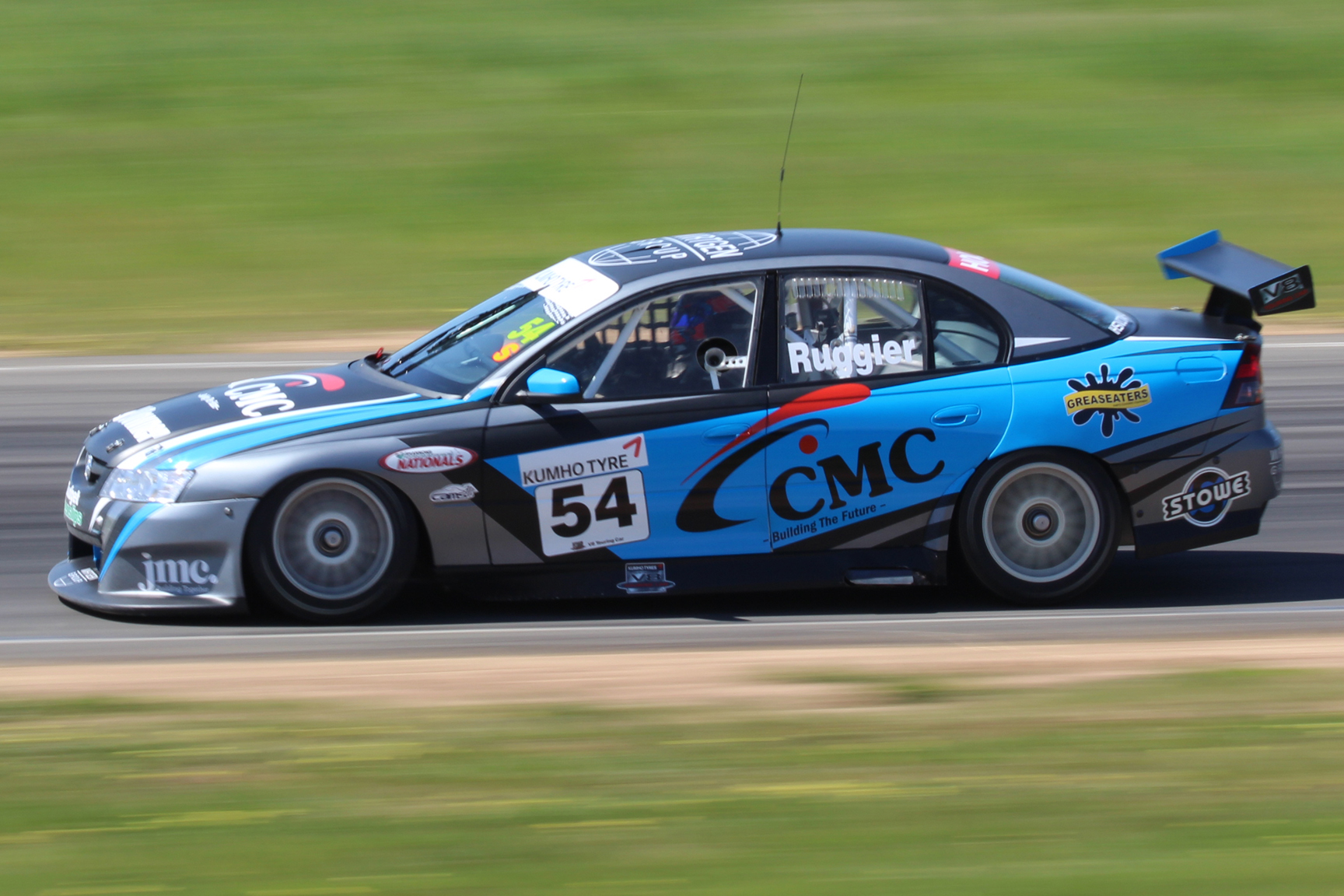
Kumho V8 Touring Car champion Justin Ruggier.

Round	Circuit	Location / State	Date	Series	Winner
1	(Victoria (state)) Sandown Raceway	Melbourne, Victoria	28–30 March	Australian Drivers' Championship	Ben Gersekowski
1	(Victoria (state)) Sandown Raceway	Melbourne, Victoria	28–30 March	Australian GT Championship	Richard Muscat
1	(Victoria (state)) Sandown Raceway	Melbourne, Victoria	28–30 March	Australian Manufacturers' Championship; Australian Production Car Championship	Mitsubishi; Rob Marshall / Shane Marshall
1	(Victoria (state)) Sandown Raceway	Melbourne, Victoria	28–30 March	Australian Saloon Car Series	Travis Lindorff
1	(Victoria (state)) Sandown Raceway	Melbourne, Victoria	28–30 March	Porsche GT3 Cup Challenge Australia	Fraser Ross
1	(Victoria (state)) Sandown Raceway	Melbourne, Victoria	28–30 March	Radical Australia Cup	Neale Muston
2	(South Australia) Mallala Motor Sport Park	Mallala, South Australia	25–27 April	Australian Formula Ford Series	James Golding
2	(South Australia) Mallala Motor Sport Park	Mallala, South Australia	25–27 April	Australian Saloon Car Series	Gavin Ross
2	(South Australia) Mallala Motor Sport Park	Mallala, South Australia	25–27 April	Kerrick Sports Sedan Series	Tony Ricciardello
2	(South Australia) Mallala Motor Sport Park	Mallala, South Australia	25–27 April	Kumho V8 Touring Car Series	Ryan Simpson
2	(South Australia) Mallala Motor Sport Park	Mallala, South Australia	25–27 April	Porsche GT3 Cup Challenge Australia	John Goodacre
2	(South Australia) Mallala Motor Sport Park	Mallala, South Australia	25–27 April	Sports Racer Series	Roger I'Anson
3	(Victoria (state)) Phillip Island Grand Prix Circuit	Phillip Island, Victoria	23–25 May	Australian Carrera Cup Championship	Stephen Grove / Scott McLaughlin
3	(Victoria (state)) Phillip Island Grand Prix Circuit	Phillip Island, Victoria	23–25 May	Australian GT Championship	Tony Quinn / Garth Tander
3	(Victoria (state)) Phillip Island Grand Prix Circuit	Phillip Island, Victoria	23–25 May	Australian Manufacturers' Championship; Australian Production Car Championship	Mitsubishi; Bob Pearson / Glenn Seton
3	(Victoria (state)) Phillip Island Grand Prix Circuit	Phillip Island, Victoria	23–25 May	Radical Australia Cup	Tim Berryman
4	(Victoria (state)) Winton Motor Raceway	Benalla, Victoria	13–15 June	Australian Formula Ford Series	Jordan Lloyd
4	(Victoria (state)) Winton Motor Raceway	Benalla, Victoria	13–15 June	Australian Saloon Car Series	Travis Lindorff
4	(Victoria (state)) Winton Motor Raceway	Benalla, Victoria	13–15 June	Kerrick Sports Sedan Series	Tony Ricciardello
4	(Victoria (state)) Winton Motor Raceway	Benalla, Victoria	13–15 June	Kumho V8 Touring Car Series	Ryan Simpson
4	(Victoria (state)) Winton Motor Raceway	Benalla, Victoria	13–15 June	Porsche GT3 Cup Challenge Australia	Fraser Ross
4	(Victoria (state)) Winton Motor Raceway	Benalla, Victoria	13–15 June	Sports Racer Series	Roger I'Anson
5	(New South Wales) Sydney Motorsport Park	Sydney, New South Wales	11–13 July	Australian Manufacturers' Championship; Australian Production Car Championship	Mitsubishi; Garry Holt / Stuart Kostera
5	(New South Wales) Sydney Motorsport Park	Sydney, New South Wales	11–13 July	Australian Superkart Championship	Gary Pegoraro
5	(New South Wales) Sydney Motorsport Park	Sydney, New South Wales	11–13 July	Radical Australia Cup	Tim Berryman / James Winslow
5	(New South Wales) Sydney Motorsport Park	Sydney, New South Wales	11–13 July	Sports Racer Series	Adam Proctor
6	Queensland Raceway	Ipswich, Queensland	8–10 August	Australian Drivers' Championship	Ben Gersekowski
6	Queensland Raceway	Ipswich, Queensland	8–10 August	Australian Formula Ford Series	Hamish Hardeman
6	Queensland Raceway	Ipswich, Queensland	8–10 August	Australian Manufacturers' Championship; Australian Production Car Championship	Mitsubishi; Garry Holt / Stuart Kostera
6	Queensland Raceway	Ipswich, Queensland	8–10 August	Australian Saloon Car Series	Kane Baxter-Smith
6	Queensland Raceway	Ipswich, Queensland	8–10 August	Kerrick Sports Sedan Series	Tony Ricciardello
6	Queensland Raceway	Ipswich, Queensland	8–10 August	Kumho V8 Touring Car Series	Ryan Simpson
6	Queensland Raceway	Ipswich, Queensland	8–10 August	Porsche GT3 Cup Challenge Australia	Jon McCorkindale
7	(Victoria (state)) Phillip Island Grand Prix Circuit	Phillip Island, Victoria	19–21 September	Australian Drivers' Championship	Simon Hodge
7	(Victoria (state)) Phillip Island Grand Prix Circuit	Phillip Island, Victoria	19–21 September	Australian Saloon Car Series	Gavin Ross
7	(Victoria (state)) Phillip Island Grand Prix Circuit	Phillip Island, Victoria	19–21 September	Australian Superkart Championship	Gary Pegoraro
7	(Victoria (state)) Phillip Island Grand Prix Circuit	Phillip Island, Victoria	19–21 September	Kerrick Sports Sedan Series	Michael Robinson
7	(Victoria (state)) Phillip Island Grand Prix Circuit	Phillip Island, Victoria	19–21 September	Kumho V8 Touring Car Series	Cameron McConville
7	(Victoria (state)) Phillip Island Grand Prix Circuit	Phillip Island, Victoria	19–21 September	Porsche GT3 Cup Challenge Australia	Matt Campbell
7	(Victoria (state)) Phillip Island Grand Prix Circuit	Phillip Island, Victoria	19–21 September	Radical Australia Cup	Tim Berryman
7	(Victoria (state)) Phillip Island Grand Prix Circuit	Phillip Island, Victoria	19–21 September	Sports Racer Series	Adam Proctor
8	(New South Wales) Wakefield Park	Goulburn, New South Wales	17–19 October	Australian Formula Ford Series	James Golding
8	(New South Wales) Wakefield Park	Goulburn, New South Wales	17–19 October	Australian Manufacturers' Championship; Australian Production Car Championship	BMW; Beric Lynton
8	(New South Wales) Wakefield Park	Goulburn, New South Wales	17–19 October	Australian Saloon Car Series	Gavin Ross
8	(New South Wales) Wakefield Park	Goulburn, New South Wales	17–19 October	Kumho V8 Touring Car Series	Justin Ruggier
8	(New South Wales) Wakefield Park	Goulburn, New South Wales	17–19 October	Sports Racer Series	Jon Miles
9	(New South Wales) Sydney Motorsport Park	Sydney, New South Wales	31 October–2 November	Australian Drivers' Championship	Simon Hodge
9	(New South Wales) Sydney Motorsport Park	Sydney, New South Wales	31 October–2 November	Australian Formula Ford Series	Thomas Randle
9	(New South Wales) Sydney Motorsport Park	Sydney, New South Wales	31 October–2 November	Kerrick Sports Sedan Series	Tony Ricciardello
9	(New South Wales) Sydney Motorsport Park	Sydney, New South Wales	31 October–2 November	Kumho V8 Touring Car Series	Justin Ruggier
9	(New South Wales) Sydney Motorsport Park	Sydney, New South Wales	31 October–2 November	PRB Motorsport Series	Stuart Shirvington
9	(New South Wales) Sydney Motorsport Park	Sydney, New South Wales	31 October–2 November	Radical Australia Cup	Tim Berryman
Round	Circuit	City / State	Date	Series	Winner

== Series champions ==
Series	Champion	Vehicle	Main article
Exclusively held at Shannons Nationals events
Australian Manufacturers' Championship	BMW	BMW 1M; BMW 135i BMW 335i BMW M130i; BMW 130i	2014 Australian Manufacturers' Championship
Australian Production Car Championship	Beric Lynton	BMW 1M	2014 Australian Manufacturers' Championship
Australian Saloon Car Series	Gavin Ross	Holden VT Commodore	2014 Australian Saloon Car Series
Australian Sports Racer Series	Adam Proctor	Stohr WF-1 Suzuki	2014 Sports Racer Series
Australian Superkart Championship	Gary Pegoraro	Anderson Maverick-BRC	2014 Australian Superkart Championship
Kerrick Sports Sedan Series	Tony Ricciardello	Alfa Romeo Alfetta GTV-Chevrolet	2014 Kerrick Sports Sedan Series
Kumho V8 Touring Car National Series	Justin Ruggier	Holden VZ Commodore	2014 Kumho Tyres V8 Touring Car Series
Selected races held at Shannons Nationals events
Australian Carrera Cup Championship	Steven Richards	Porsche 911 GT3 Cup Type 991	2014 Australian Carrera Cup Championship
Australian Drivers' Championship	Simon Hodge	Mygale M11 HWA-Mercedes	2014 Australian Drivers' Championship
Australian Formula Ford Series	Thomas Randle	Mygale SJ13a	2014 Australian Formula Ford Series
Australian GT Championship	Richard Muscat	Mercedes-Benz SLS AMG	2014 Australian GT Championship season
Porsche GT3 Cup Challenge Australia	Fraser Ross	Porsche 911 GT3 Cup Type 997 3.8	2014 Porsche GT3 Cup Challenge Australia season
PRB Motorsport Series	Chris Barry	PRB Clubman S3	2014 PRB Motorsport Series
Radical Australia Cup	Tim Berryman	Radical SR8	2014 Radical Australia Cup
