= List of Australian Manufacturers' Championship races =

This list of Australian Manufacturers' Championship races summarises all rounds of the Australian Manufacturers' Championship (1971 to 1975) and its successor the Australian Championship of Makes (1976 to 1980). It does not currently include the subsequent Australian Endurance Championship (1981), Australian Endurance Championship of Makes (1982 to 1984) and Australian Manufacturers' Championship titles (1985 to 1991, 1994 and 2008 onwards).

In 1976 and 1977 these endurance races doubled as Australian Touring Car Championship rounds but in other years they were separate races not overlapping with the ATCC.

== Australian Manufacturers' Championship ==
Year	Round	Date	Circuit	Winner	Team	Car
1971	1	12 April	Mount Panorama, Bathurst	Allan Moffat	Ford Motor Company	Ford XW Falcon GTHO
1971	2	2 May	Warwick Farm Raceway	Colin Bond	Holden Dealer Team	Holden LC Torana GTR XU-1
1971	3	12 September	Sandown Raceway	Colin Bond	Holden Dealer Team	Holden LC Torana GTR XU-1
1971	4	24 October	Phillip Island	Colin Bond	Holden Dealer Team	Holden LC Torana GTR XU-1
1971	5	7 November	Surfers Paradise Raceway	Allan Moffat	Ford Motor Company	Ford XY Falcon GTHO
1972	1	27 August	Adelaide International Raceway	Colin Bond	Holden Dealer Team	Holden LJ Torana GTR XU-1
1972	2	10 September	Sandown Raceway	John Goss	McLeod Ford	Ford XY Falcon GTHO
1972	3	1 October	Mount Panorama, Bathurst	Peter Brock	Holden Dealer Team	Holden LJ Torana GTR XU-1
1972	4	21 October	Phillip Island	Allan Moffat	Ford Motor Company	Ford XY Falcon GTHO
1972	5	26 November	Surfers Paradise Raceway	Allan Moffat	Ford Motor Company	Ford XY Falcon GTHO
1973	1	26 August	Adelaide International Raceway	Fred Gibson	Ford Motor Company	Ford XA Falcon GT
1973	2	9 September	Sandown Raceway	Peter Brock	Holden Dealer Team	Holden LJ Torana GTR XU-1
1973	3	30 September	Mount Panorama, Bathurst	Allan Moffat	Ford Motor Company	Ford XA Falcon GT
1973	4	12 November	Surfers Paradise Raceway	Peter Brock	Holden Dealer Team	Holden LJ Torana GTR XU-1
1973	5	25 November	Phillip Island	Peter Brock	Holden Dealer Team	Holden LJ Torana GTR XU-1
1974	1	15 August	Adelaide International Raceway	Colin Bond	Holden Dealer Team	Holden LH Torana SL/R 5000 L34
1974	2	8 September	Sandown Raceway	Allan Moffat	Allan Moffat Racing	Ford XB Falcon GT
1974	3	6 October	Mount Panorama, Bathurst	John Goss	McLeod Ford	Ford XA Falcon GT
1974	4	10 November	Surfers Paradise Raceway	Colin Bond	Holden Dealer Team	Holden LH Torana SL/R 5000 L34
1974	5	24 November	Phillip Island	Colin Bond	Holden Dealer Team	Holden LH Torana SL/R 5000 L34
1975	1	24 August	Adelaide International Raceway	Colin Bond	Holden Dealer Team	Holden LH Torana SL/R 5000 L34
1975	2	14 September	Sandown Raceway	Peter Brock	Gown-Hindhaugh	Holden LH Torana SL/R 5000 L34
1975	3	5 October	Mount Panorama, Bathurst	Peter Brock	Gown-Hindhaugh	Holden LH Torana SL/R 5000 L34
1975	4	9 November	Surfers Paradise Raceway	Allan Moffat	Allan Moffat Racing	Ford XB Falcon GT
1975	5	23 November	Phillip Island	Peter Brock	Gown-Hindhaugh	Holden LH Torana SL/R 5000 L34

== Australian Championship of Makes ==
Year	Round	Date	Circuit	Winner	Team	Car
1976	1	12 September	Sandown Raceway	Peter Brock	Team Brock	Holden LH Torana SL/R 5000 L34
1976	2	24 October	Adelaide International Raceway	Allan Grice	Craven Mild Racing	Holden LH Torana SL/R 5000 L34
1976	3	30 October	Surfers Paradise Raceway	Peter Brock	Team Brock	Holden LH Torana SL/R 5000 L34
1976	4	28 November	Phillip Island	Colin Bond	Holden Dealer Team	Holden LH Torana SL/R 5000 L34
1977	1	11 September	Sandown Raceway	Peter Brock	Bill Patterson Motors	Holden LX Torana SS5000 A9X Hatchback
1977	2	23 October	Adelaide International Raceway	Allan Moffat	Moffat-Ford Dealers Team	Ford XC Falcon GS Hardtop
1977	3	6 November	Surfers Paradise Raceway	Allan Moffat	Moffat-Ford Dealers Team	Ford XC Falcon GS Hardtop
1977	4	20 November	Phillip Island	Allan Grice	Craven Mild Racing	Holden LX Torana SS5000 A9X Hatchback
1978	1	30 July	Oran Park Raceway	Peter Brock	Holden Dealer Team	Holden LX Torana SS5000 A9X Hatchback
1978	2	10 September	Sandown Raceway	Peter Brock	Holden Dealer Team	Holden LX Torana SS5000 A9X Hatchback
1978	3	22 October	Adelaide International Raceway	Colin Bond	Moffat-Ford Dealers Team	Ford XC Falcon Cobra
1978	4	5 November	Surfers Paradise Raceway	Peter Brock	Holden Dealer Team	Holden LX Torana SS5000 A9X Hatchback
1978	5	3 December	Calder Park Raceway	Peter Janson	Peter Janson	Holden LX Torana SS5000 A9X Hatchback
1979	1	19 September	Sandown Park	Peter Brock	Holden Dealer Team	Holden LX Torana SS5000 A9X Hatchback
1979	2	21 October	Adelaide International Raceway	Allan Grice	Craven Mild Racing	Holden LX Torana SS5000 A9X Hatchback
1979	3	4 November	Surfers Paradise	Charlie O'Brien	O'Brien Transport	Holden LX Torana SLR5000 A9X
1980	1	17 August	Adelaide International Raceway	Peter Brock	Holden Dealer Team	Holden VB Commodore
1980	2	14 September	Sandown Raceway	Peter Brock	Holden Dealer Team	Holden VC Commodore
1980	3	2 November	Surfers Paradise Raceway	Charlie O'Brien	Roadways/Gown-Hindhaugh	Holden VC Commodore
