= 2012 Shannons Nationals Racing Championships season =

Australian motor racing season

2012 Shannons Nationals Motor Racing Championships

Seasons
- ← 2011 2013 →

The 2012 Shannons Nationals Motor Racing Championships season was the seventh time that the Shannons Nationals Motor Racing Championships were held. The season began on 9 March 2012 at Sydney Motorsport Park and finished on 25 November 2012 at Sandown Raceway.

The 2012 Australian Saloon Car Series, 2012 Australian Sports Sedan Championship, 2012 Australian Superkart Championship, 2012 Australian Suzuki Swift Series, 2012 Commodore Cup National Series, 2012 Kumho V8 Touring Car Series and the 2012 Porsche GT3 Cup Challenge Australia were all held exclusively on the Shannons Nationals calendar. Rounds of the 2012 Australian Drivers' Championship, 2012 Australian GT Championship, 2012 Australian Manufacturers' Championship, 2012 Radical Australia Cup and the 2012 Touring Car Masters season were also part of the Shannons Nationals schedule.

== Calendar and round winners ==
Round	Circuit	City / State	Date	Series	Winner
1	(New South Wales) Eastern Creek Raceway	Sydney, New South Wales	9–11 March	Australian Manufacturers' Championship; Australian Production Car Championship	Mitsubishi; Stuart Kostera / Ian Tulloch
1	(New South Wales) Eastern Creek Raceway	Sydney, New South Wales	9–11 March	Australian Suzuki Swift Series	Allan Jarvis
1	(New South Wales) Eastern Creek Raceway	Sydney, New South Wales	9–11 March	Commodore Cup	Adam Beechey
1	(New South Wales) Eastern Creek Raceway	Sydney, New South Wales	9–11 March	Kumho V8 Touring Car Series	Josh Hunter
1	(New South Wales) Eastern Creek Raceway	Sydney, New South Wales	9–11 March	Radical Australia Cup	Neale Muston
2	(South Australia) Mallala Motor Sport Park	Mallala, South Australia	13–15 April	Australian Saloon Car Series	Simon Tabinor
2	(South Australia) Mallala Motor Sport Park	Mallala, South Australia	13–15 April	Australian Sports Sedan Championship	Kerry Baily
2	(South Australia) Mallala Motor Sport Park	Mallala, South Australia	13–15 April	Australian Suzuki Swift Series	Reece Murphy
2	(South Australia) Mallala Motor Sport Park	Mallala, South Australia	13–15 April	Commodore Cup	Adam Beechey
2	(South Australia) Mallala Motor Sport Park	Mallala, South Australia	13–15 April	Kumho V8 Touring Car Series	Chris Smerdon
2	(South Australia) Mallala Motor Sport Park	Mallala, South Australia	13–15 April	Porsche GT3 Cup Challenge Australia	John Modystach
3	(Victoria (state)) Phillip Island Grand Prix Circuit	Phillip Island, Victoria	25–27 May	Australian GT Championship	Greg Crick
3	(Victoria (state)) Phillip Island Grand Prix Circuit	Phillip Island, Victoria	25–27 May	Australian Manufacturers' Championship; Australian Production Car Championship	Mitsubishi; Garry Holt / Ryan McLeod
3	(Victoria (state)) Phillip Island Grand Prix Circuit	Phillip Island, Victoria	25–27 May	Australian Sports Sedan Championship	Kerry Baily
3	(Victoria (state)) Phillip Island Grand Prix Circuit	Phillip Island, Victoria	25–27 May	Australian Superkart Championship	Darren Hossack
3	(Victoria (state)) Phillip Island Grand Prix Circuit	Phillip Island, Victoria	25–27 May	Porsche GT3 Cup Challenge Australia	Kane Rose
3	(Victoria (state)) Phillip Island Grand Prix Circuit	Phillip Island, Victoria	25–27 May	Touring Car Masters	Gavin Bullas
4	(Victoria (state)) Winton Motor Raceway	Benalla, Victoria	22–24 June	Australian GT Championship	Peter Hackett
4	(Victoria (state)) Winton Motor Raceway	Benalla, Victoria	22–24 June	Australian Saloon Car Series	Josh Kean
4	(Victoria (state)) Winton Motor Raceway	Benalla, Victoria	22–24 June	Australian Suzuki Swift Series	Damian Ward
4	(Victoria (state)) Winton Motor Raceway	Benalla, Victoria	22–24 June	Commodore Cup	Adam Beechey / Dean Croswell
4	(Victoria (state)) Winton Motor Raceway	Benalla, Victoria	22–24 June	Kumho V8 Touring Car Series	Josh Hunter
4	(Victoria (state)) Winton Motor Raceway	Benalla, Victoria	22–24 June	Porsche GT3 Cup Challenge Australia	Kane Rose
5	(New South Wales) Sydney Motorsport Park	Sydney, New South Wales	13–15 July	Australian Drivers' Championship	Tim Macrow
5	(New South Wales) Sydney Motorsport Park	Sydney, New South Wales	13–15 July	Australian GT Championship	John Bowe / Peter Edwards
5	(New South Wales) Sydney Motorsport Park	Sydney, New South Wales	13–15 July	Australian Sports Sedan Championship	Tony Ricciardello
5	(New South Wales) Sydney Motorsport Park	Sydney, New South Wales	13–15 July	Australian Suzuki Swift Series	Reece Murphy
5	(New South Wales) Sydney Motorsport Park	Sydney, New South Wales	13–15 July	Porsche GT3 Cup Challenge Australia	Kane Rose
5	(New South Wales) Sydney Motorsport Park	Sydney, New South Wales	13–15 July	Radical Australia Cup	Neale Muston
6	Queensland Raceway	Ipswich, Queensland	10–12 August	Australian Manufacturers' Championship; Australian Production Car Championship	Mitsubishi; Garry Holt / Ryan McLeod
6	Queensland Raceway	Ipswich, Queensland	10–12 August	Australian Saloon Car Series	Matt Shanks
6	Queensland Raceway	Ipswich, Queensland	10–12 August	Australian Sports Sedan Championship	Darren Hossack
6	Queensland Raceway	Ipswich, Queensland	10–12 August	Australian Superkart Championship	Jason Smith
6	Queensland Raceway	Ipswich, Queensland	10–12 August	Australian Suzuki Swift Series	Allan Jarvis
6	Queensland Raceway	Ipswich, Queensland	10–12 August	Kumho V8 Touring Car Series	Morgan Haber
6	Queensland Raceway	Ipswich, Queensland	10–12 August	Porsche GT3 Cup Challenge Australia	Brent Odgers
6	Queensland Raceway	Ipswich, Queensland	10–12 August	Radical Australia Cup	Simon Haggarty
7	(Victoria (state)) Phillip Island Grand Prix Circuit	Phillip Island, Victoria	21–23 September	Australian Drivers' Championship	James Winslow
7	(Victoria (state)) Phillip Island Grand Prix Circuit	Phillip Island, Victoria	21–23 September	Australian GT Championship	Maro Engel
7	(Victoria (state)) Phillip Island Grand Prix Circuit	Phillip Island, Victoria	21–23 September	Australian Saloon Car Series	Josh Kean
7	(Victoria (state)) Phillip Island Grand Prix Circuit	Phillip Island, Victoria	21–23 September	Kumho V8 Touring Car Series	Josh Hunter
7	(Victoria (state)) Phillip Island Grand Prix Circuit	Phillip Island, Victoria	21–23 September	Porsche GT3 Cup Challenge Australia	Jeff Bobik
7	(Victoria (state)) Phillip Island Grand Prix Circuit	Phillip Island, Victoria	21–23 September	Radical Australia Cup	Neale Muston
8	(New South Wales) Wakefield Park	Goulburn, New South Wales	12–14 October	Australian Saloon Car Series	Simon Tabinor
8	(New South Wales) Wakefield Park	Goulburn, New South Wales	12–14 October	Australian Sports Sedan Championship	Tony Ricciardello
8	(New South Wales) Wakefield Park	Goulburn, New South Wales	12–14 October	Australian Suzuki Swift Series	Damien Ward
8	(New South Wales) Wakefield Park	Goulburn, New South Wales	12–14 October	Commodore Cup	Adam Beechey
8	(New South Wales) Wakefield Park	Goulburn, New South Wales	12–14 October	V8 Touring Car Heritage Round	Chris Delfsma
9	(Victoria (state)) Sandown Raceway	Melbourne, Victoria	23–25 November	Australian Manufacturers' Championship; Australian Production Car Championship	Mitsubishi; Stuart Kostera / Ian Tulloch
9	(Victoria (state)) Sandown Raceway	Melbourne, Victoria	23–25 November	Australian Saloon Car Series	Simon Tabinor
9	(Victoria (state)) Sandown Raceway	Melbourne, Victoria	23–25 November	Australian Suzuki Swift Series	Allan Jarvis
9	(Victoria (state)) Sandown Raceway	Melbourne, Victoria	23–25 November	Commodore Cup	Adam Beechey
9	(Victoria (state)) Sandown Raceway	Melbourne, Victoria	23–25 November	Kumho V8 Touring Car Series	Josh Hunter
9	(Victoria (state)) Sandown Raceway	Melbourne, Victoria	23–25 November	Touring Car Masters	John Bowe
Round	Circuit	City / State	Date	Series	Winner
Dates sourced from:

== Series champions ==
Series	Champion	Vehicle	Main article
Australian Drivers' Championship	James Winslow	Dallara F307 HWA-Mercedes	2012 Australian Drivers' Championship
Australian GT Championship	Klark Quinn	Porsche 997 GT3-R	2012 Australian GT Championship
Australian Manufacturers' Championship	Mitsubishi	Mitsubishi Lancer Evo X	2012 Australian Manufacturers' Championship
Australian Production Car Championship	Stuart Kostera	Mitsubishi Lancer Evo X	2012 Australian Manufacturers' Championship
Australian Saloon Car Series	Simon Tabinor	Holden VT Commodore	2012 Australian Saloon Car Series
Australian Sports Sedan Championship	Kerry Baily	Aston Martin DBR9-Chevrolet	2012 Australian Sports Sedan season
Australian Superkart Championship	Jason Smith	Anderson-DEA	2012 Australian Superkart Championship
Australian Suzuki Swift Series	Allan Jarvis	Suzuki Swift Sport RS	2012 Australian Suzuki Swift Series season
Commodore Cup	Adam Beechey	Holden VS Commodore	2012 Commodore Cup National Series
Kumho V8 Touring Car National Series	Josh Hunter	Ford BA Falcon	2012 Kumho Tyres V8 Touring Car Series
Porsche GT3 Cup Challenge Australia	Kane Rose	Porsche 911 GT3 Cup Type 997	2012 Porsche GT3 Cup Challenge Australia season
Radical Australia Cup	Neale Muston	Radical SR3	2012 Radical Australia Cup
Touring Car Masters	John Bowe	Ford Mustang Trans-Am	2012 Touring Car Masters season
