= 2013 Shannons Nationals Racing Championships season =

Australian motor racing season

2013 Shannons Nationals Motor Racing Championships

Seasons
- ← 2012 2014 →

The 2013 Shannons Nationals Motor Racing Championships season was the eighth time that the Shannons Nationals Motor Racing Championships were held. The season began on 22 March 2013 at Sydney Motorsport Park and finished on 17 November 2013 at Sandown Raceway.

The 2013 Australian Manufacturers' Championship, 2013 Australian Saloon Car Series, 2013 Australian Superkart Championship, 2013 Australian Suzuki Swift Series, 2013 Kerrick Sports Sedan Series and the 2013 Kumho V8 Touring Car Series were all held exclusively on the Shannons Nationals calendar. Rounds of the 2013 Australian Drivers' Championship, 2013 Australian GT Championship, 2013 Porsche GT3 Cup Challenge Australia, 2013 PRB Motorsport Series and the 2013 Radical Australia Cup were also part of the Shannons Nationals schedule.

== Calendar and round winners ==
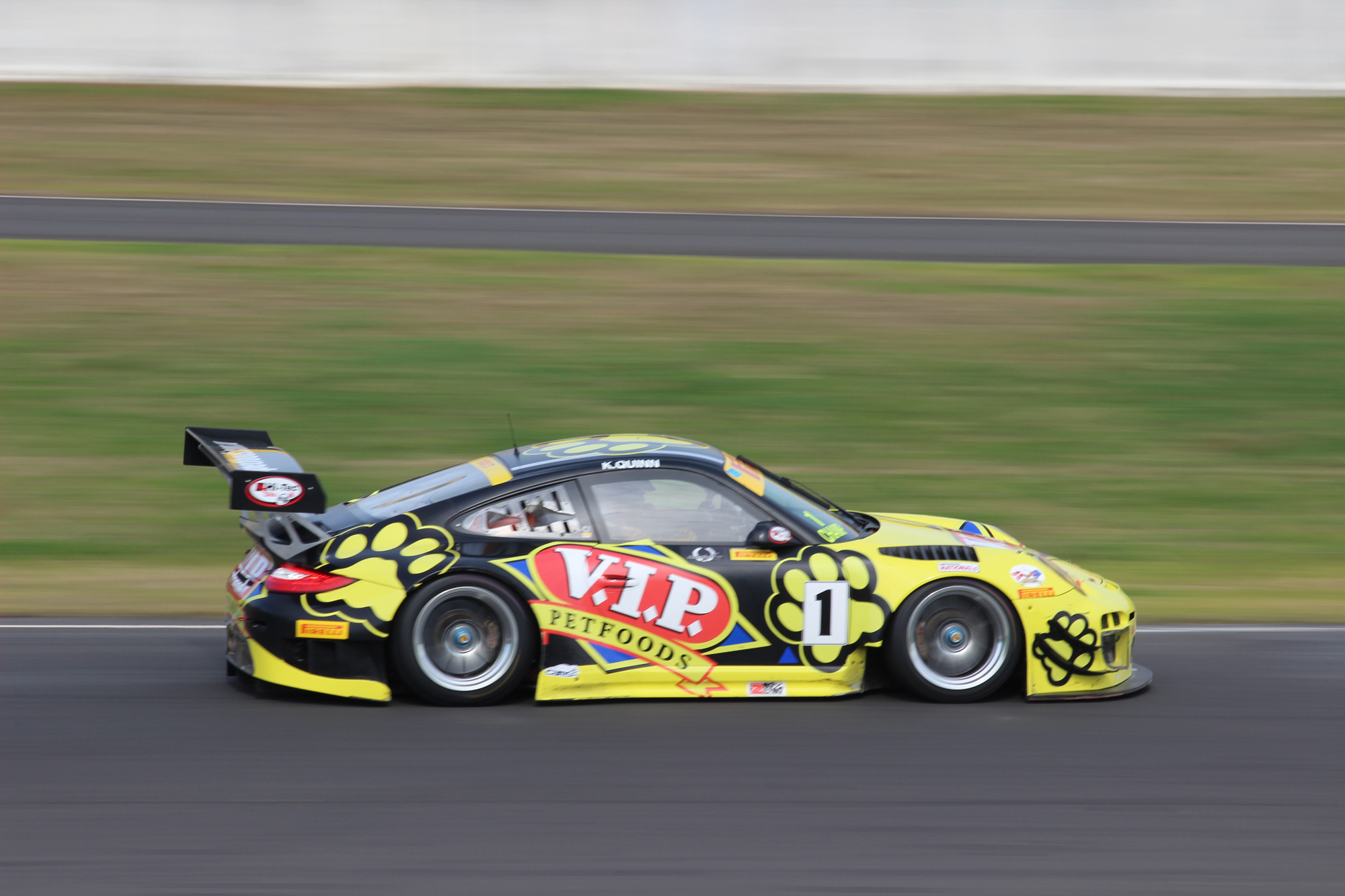
Australian GT champion Klark Quinn.

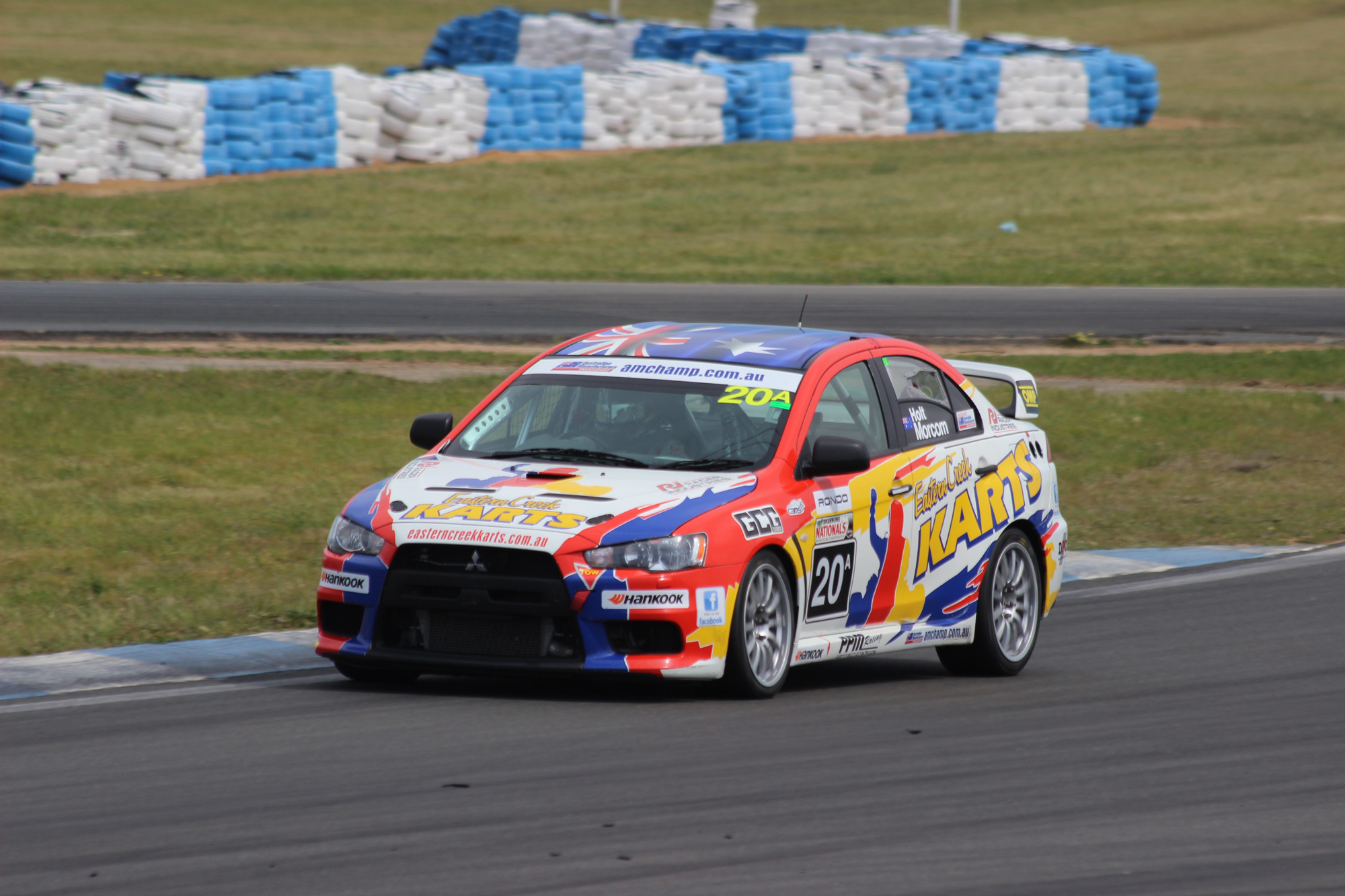
Australian Production Car champion Garry Holt, driving for Manufacturers' champion Mitsubishi.

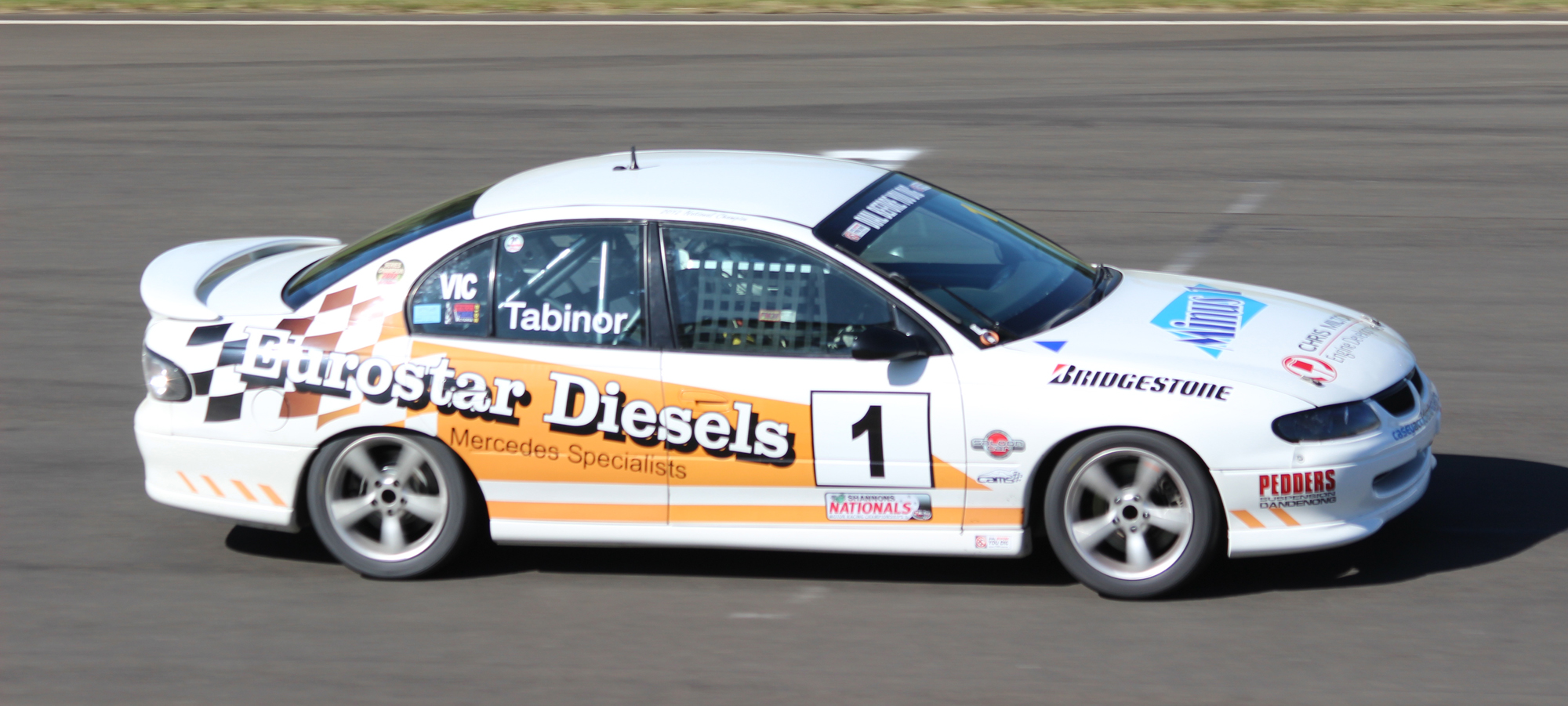
Australian Saloon Car champion Simon Tabinor.

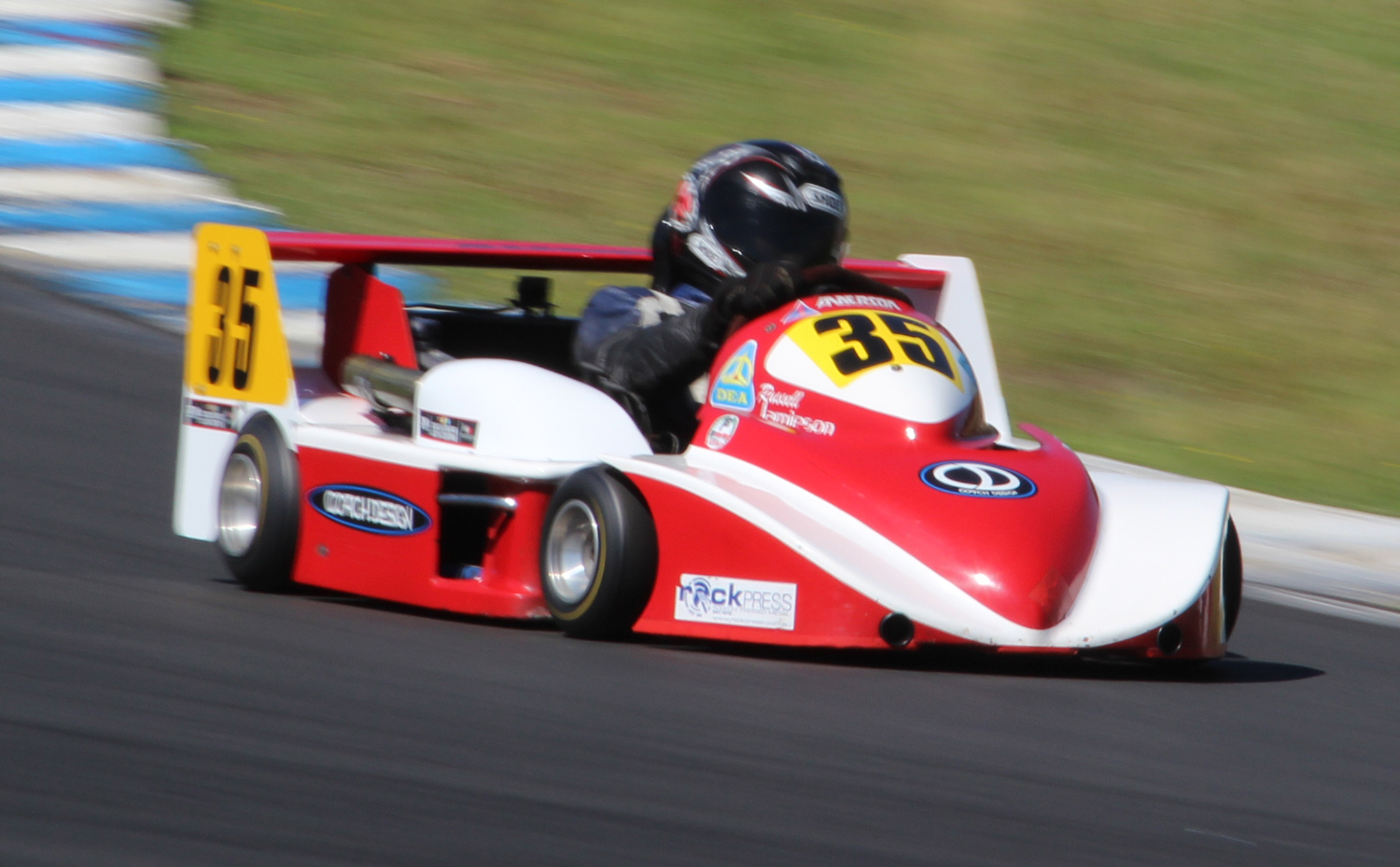
Australian Superkart champion Russell Jamieson.

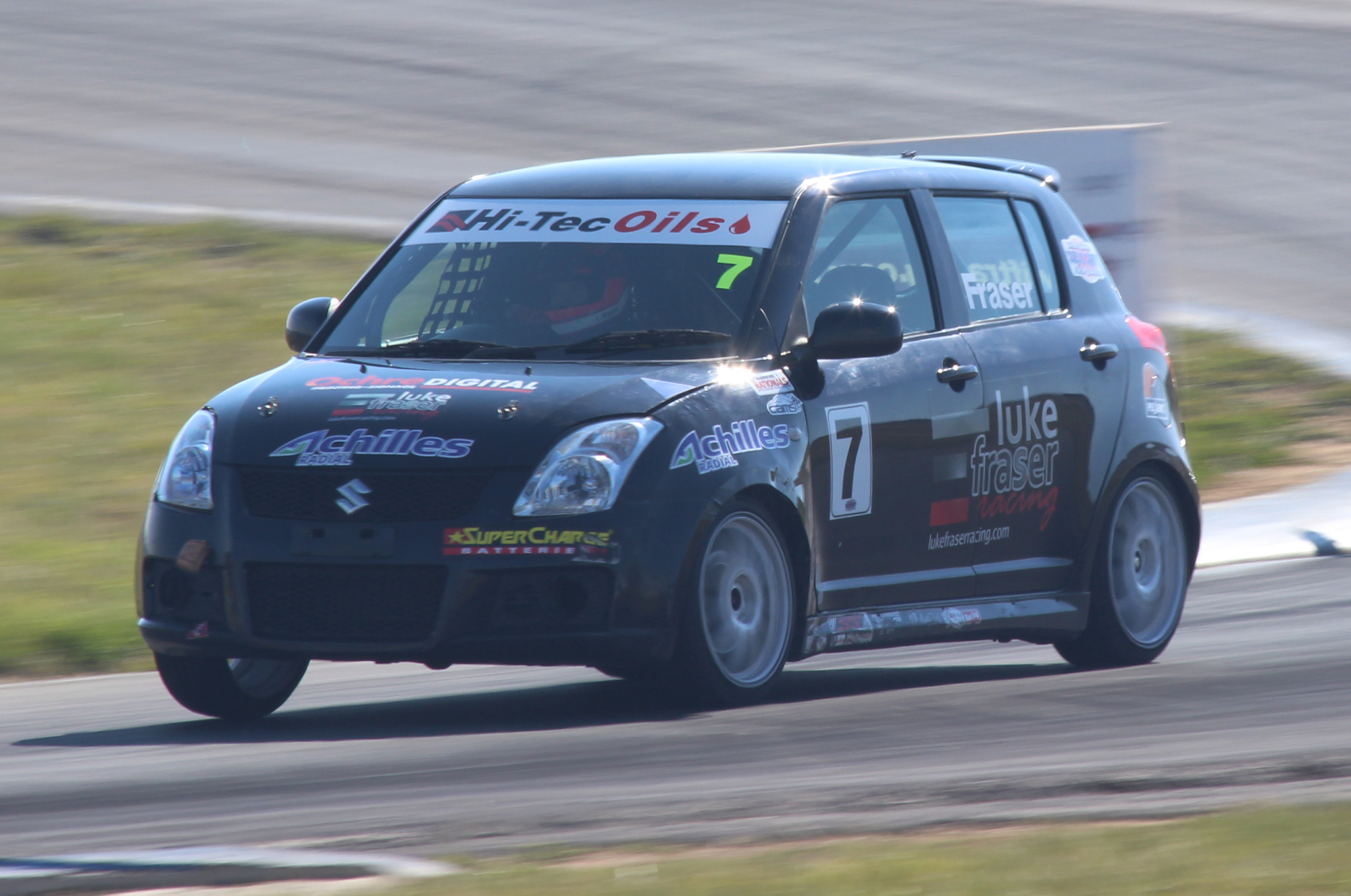
Australian Suzuki Swift Series champion Luke Fraser.

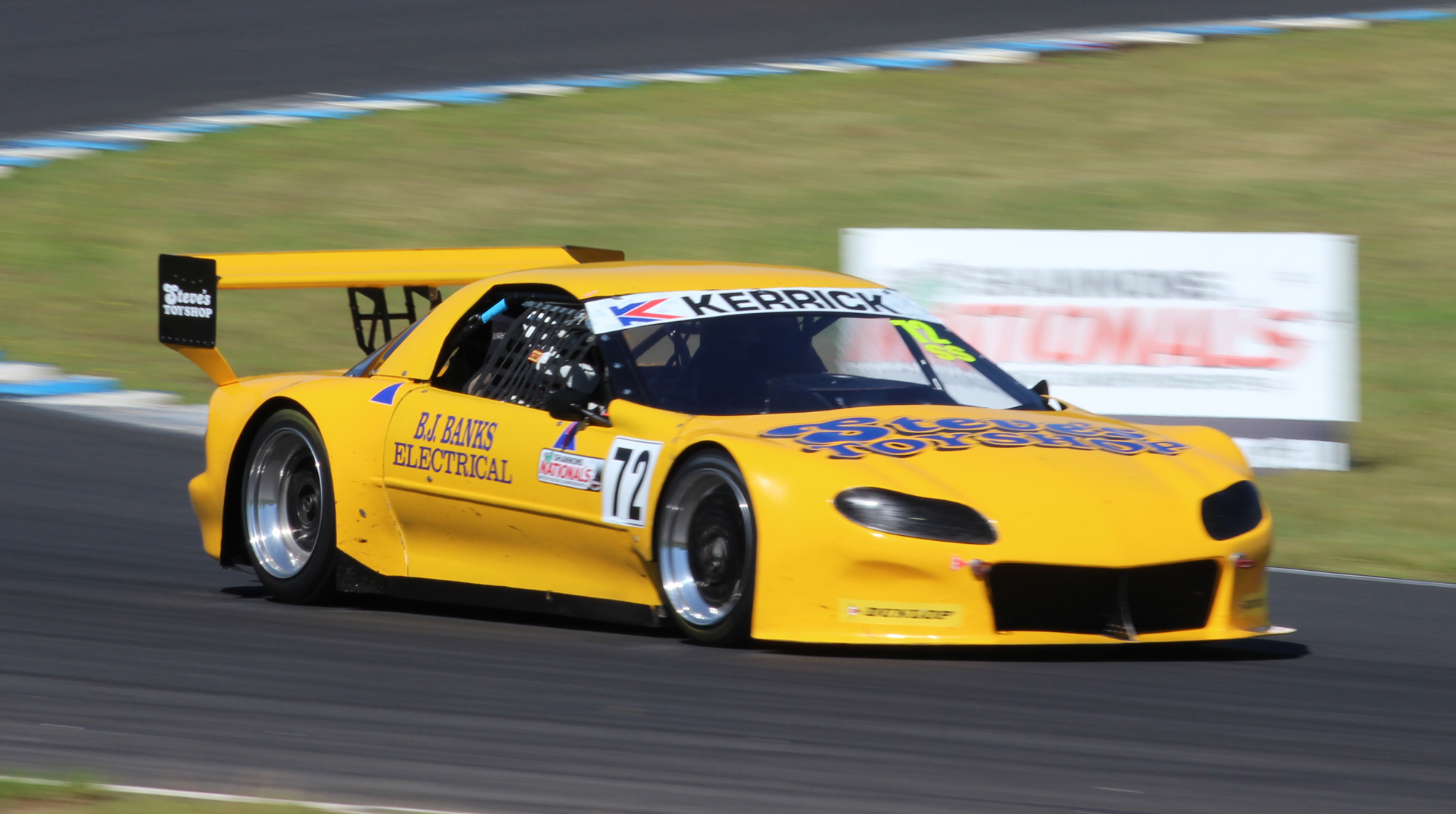
Kerrick Sports Sedan Series winner Bruce Banks.

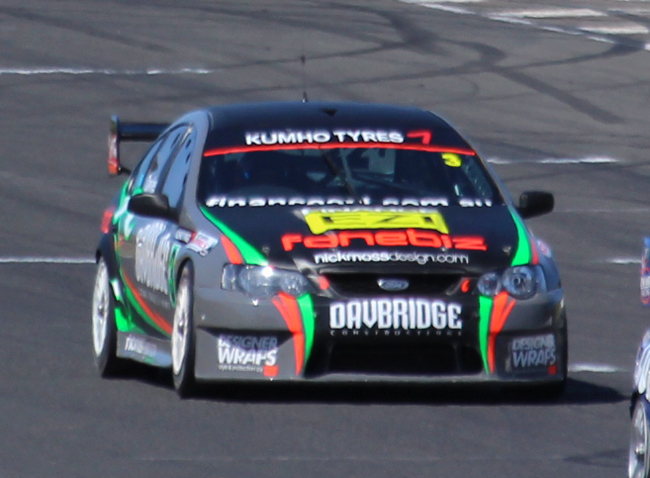
Kumho Tyres V8 Touring Car Series champion Shae Davies.

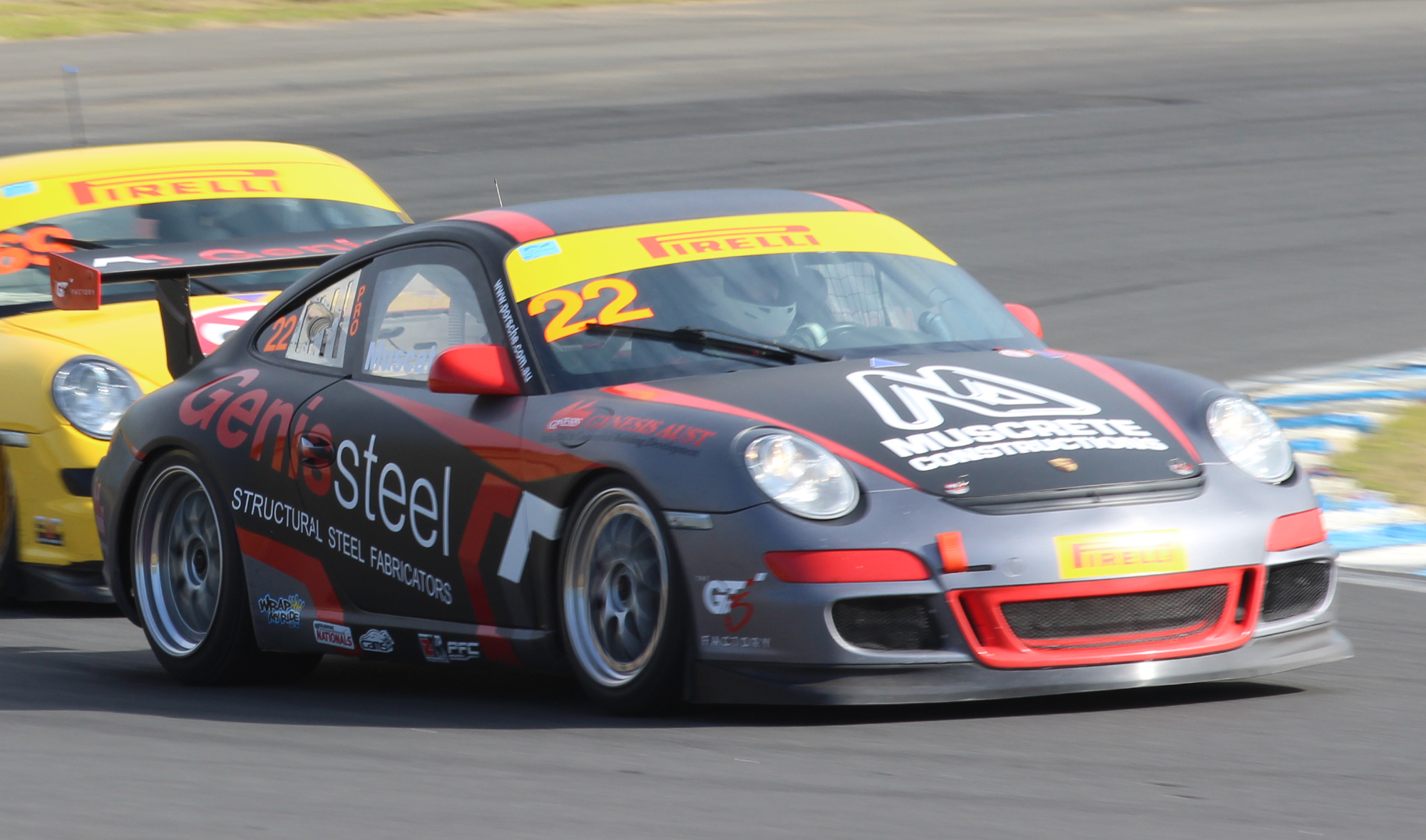
Porsche GT3 Cup Challenge Australia champion Richard Muscat.

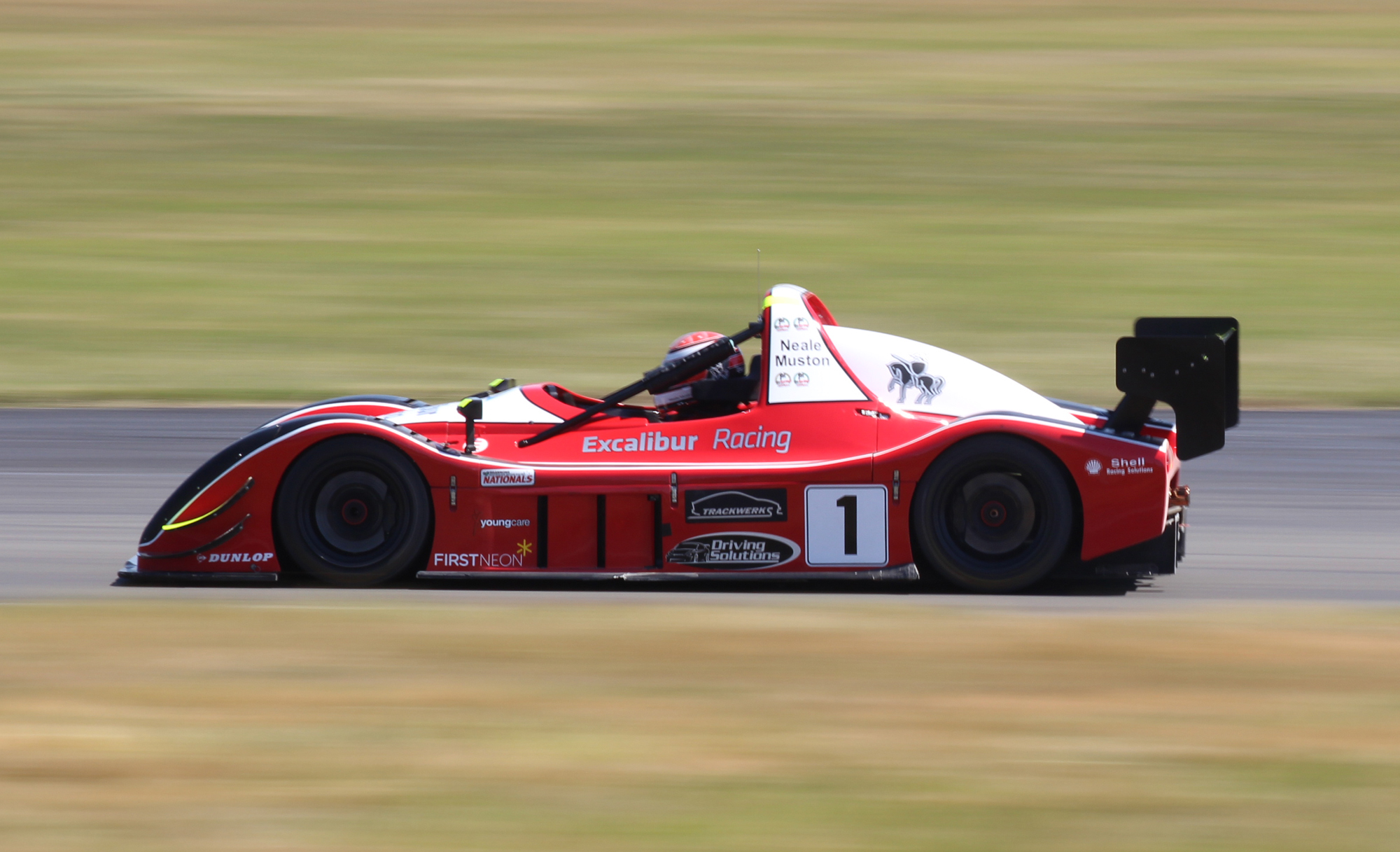
Radical Australia Cup Champion Neale Muston.

Round	Circuit	City / State	Date	Series	Winner
1	(New South Wales) Sydney Motorsport Park	Sydney, New South Wales	22–24 March	Australian Saloon Car Series	Simon Tabinor
1	(New South Wales) Sydney Motorsport Park	Sydney, New South Wales	22–24 March	Australian Superkart Championship	Russell Jamieson
1	(New South Wales) Sydney Motorsport Park	Sydney, New South Wales	22–24 March	Kerrick Sports Sedan Series	Tony Ricciardello
1	(New South Wales) Sydney Motorsport Park	Sydney, New South Wales	22–24 March	Kumho V8 Touring Car Series	Justin Garioch
1	(New South Wales) Sydney Motorsport Park	Sydney, New South Wales	22–24 March	PRB Motorsport Series	Chris Barry
1	(New South Wales) Sydney Motorsport Park	Sydney, New South Wales	22–24 March	Radical Australia Cup	Neale Muston
2	(South Australia) Mallala Motor Sport Park	Mallala, South Australia	19–21 April	Australian Saloon Car Series	Wayne King
2	(South Australia) Mallala Motor Sport Park	Mallala, South Australia	19–21 April	Australian Suzuki Swift Series	Luke Fraser
2	(South Australia) Mallala Motor Sport Park	Mallala, South Australia	19–21 April	Kerrick Sports Sedan Series	Jeff Barnes
2	(South Australia) Mallala Motor Sport Park	Mallala, South Australia	19–21 April	Kumho V8 Touring Car Series	Terry Wyhoon
2	(South Australia) Mallala Motor Sport Park	Mallala, South Australia	19–21 April	Porsche GT3 Cup Challenge Australia	Michael Almond
3	(Victoria (state)) Phillip Island Grand Prix Circuit	Phillip Island, Victoria	24–26 May	Australian GT Championship	Jack Le Brocq
3	(Victoria (state)) Phillip Island Grand Prix Circuit	Phillip Island, Victoria	24–26 May	Australian Manufacturers' Championship; Australian Production Car Championship	Mitsubishi; Bob Pearson / Glenn Seton
3	(Victoria (state)) Phillip Island Grand Prix Circuit	Phillip Island, Victoria	24–26 May	Australian Suzuki Swift Series	Luke Fraser
3	(Victoria (state)) Phillip Island Grand Prix Circuit	Phillip Island, Victoria	24–26 May	PRB Motorsport Series	Stuart Shirvington
3	(Victoria (state)) Phillip Island Grand Prix Circuit	Phillip Island, Victoria	24–26 May	Radical Australia Cup	Neale Muston
4	(Victoria (state)) Winton Motor Raceway	Benalla, Victoria	21–23 June	Australian Saloon Car Series	Wayne King
4	(Victoria (state)) Winton Motor Raceway	Benalla, Victoria	21–23 June	Australian Suzuki Swift Series	Allan Jarvis
4	(Victoria (state)) Winton Motor Raceway	Benalla, Victoria	21–23 June	Kumho V8 Touring Car Series	Tony Evangelou
4	(Victoria (state)) Winton Motor Raceway	Benalla, Victoria	21–23 June	Porsche GT3 Cup Challenge Australia	Richard Muscat
5	(New South Wales) Sydney Motorsport Park	Sydney, New South Wales	12–14 July	Australian Drivers' Championship	John Magro
5	(New South Wales) Sydney Motorsport Park	Sydney, New South Wales	12–14 July	Australian GT Championship	Jack Le Brocq
5	(New South Wales) Sydney Motorsport Park	Sydney, New South Wales	12–14 July	Australian Manufacturers' Championship; Australian Production Car Championship	Mitsubishi; Garry Holt / Ryan McLeod
5	(New South Wales) Sydney Motorsport Park	Sydney, New South Wales	12–14 July	Australian Suzuki Swift Series	Ben Grice
5	(New South Wales) Sydney Motorsport Park	Sydney, New South Wales	12–14 July	Porsche GT3 Cup Challenge Australia	John Goodacre
5	(New South Wales) Sydney Motorsport Park	Sydney, New South Wales	12–14 July	Radical Australia Cup	Neale Muston
6	Queensland Raceway	Ipswich, Queensland	2–4 August	Australian Drivers' Championship	Tim Macrow
6	Queensland Raceway	Ipswich, Queensland	2–4 August	Australian GT Championship	Klark Quinn
6	Queensland Raceway	Ipswich, Queensland	2–4 August	Australian Manufacturers' Championship; Australian Production Car Championship	Mitsubishi; Garry Holt / Ryan McLeod
6	Queensland Raceway	Ipswich, Queensland	2–4 August	Australian Saloon Car Series	Simon Tabinor
6	Queensland Raceway	Ipswich, Queensland	2–4 August	Australian Suzuki Swift Series	Ben Grice
6	Queensland Raceway	Ipswich, Queensland	2–4 August	Kerrick Sports Sedan Series	Darren Hossack
6	Queensland Raceway	Ipswich, Queensland	2–4 August	Kumho V8 Touring Car Series	Ryan Simpson
6	Queensland Raceway	Ipswich, Queensland	2–4 August	Porsche GT3 Cup Challenge Australia	Richard Muscat
7	(Victoria (state)) Phillip Island Grand Prix Circuit	Phillip Island, Victoria	19–22 September	Australian Drivers' Championship	John Magro
7	(Victoria (state)) Phillip Island Grand Prix Circuit	Phillip Island, Victoria	19–22 September	Australian Saloon Car Series	Simon Tabinor
7	(Victoria (state)) Phillip Island Grand Prix Circuit	Phillip Island, Victoria	19–22 September	Australian Superkart Championship	Russell Jamieson
7	(Victoria (state)) Phillip Island Grand Prix Circuit	Phillip Island, Victoria	19–22 September	Kerrick Sports Sedan Series	Bruce Banks
7	(Victoria (state)) Phillip Island Grand Prix Circuit	Phillip Island, Victoria	19–22 September	Kumho V8 Touring Car Series	Ryan Simpson
7	(Victoria (state)) Phillip Island Grand Prix Circuit	Phillip Island, Victoria	19–22 September	Porsche GT3 Cup Challenge Australia	Richard Muscat
7	(Victoria (state)) Phillip Island Grand Prix Circuit	Phillip Island, Victoria	19–22 September	Radical Australia Cup	Neale Muston
8	(New South Wales) Wakefield Park	Goulburn, New South Wales	18–20 October	Australian Manufacturers' Championship; Australian Production Car Championship	Mitsubishi; Garry Holt / Nathan Morcom
8	(New South Wales) Wakefield Park	Goulburn, New South Wales	18–20 October	Australian Suzuki Swift Series	Luke Fraser
8	(New South Wales) Wakefield Park	Goulburn, New South Wales	18–20 October	Radical Australia Cup	John Corbett
9	(Victoria (state)) Sandown Raceway	Melbourne, Victoria	15–17 November	Australian Drivers' Championship	John Magro
9	(Victoria (state)) Sandown Raceway	Melbourne, Victoria	15–17 November	Australian Manufacturers' Championship; Australian Production Car Championship	Mitsubishi; Garry Holt / Nathan Morcom
9	(Victoria (state)) Sandown Raceway	Melbourne, Victoria	15–17 November	Australian Saloon Car Series	Travis Lindorff
9	(Victoria (state)) Sandown Raceway	Melbourne, Victoria	15–17 November	Australian Suzuki Swift Series	Luke Fraser
9	(Victoria (state)) Sandown Raceway	Melbourne, Victoria	15–17 November	Kerrick Sports Sedan Series	Tony Ricciardello
9	(Victoria (state)) Sandown Raceway	Melbourne, Victoria	15–17 November	Kumho V8 Touring Car Series	Ryan Simpson
Round	Circuit	City / State	Date	Series	Winner

== Series champions ==
Series	Champion	Vehicle	Main article
Australian Drivers' Championship	Tim Macrow	Dallara F307 HWA-Mercedes	2013 Australian Drivers' Championship
Australian GT Championship	Klark Quinn	Porsche 997 GT3-R	2013 Australian GT Championship season
Australian Manufacturers' Championship	Mitsubishi	Mitsubishi Lancer Evo X	2013 Australian Manufacturers' Championship
Australian Production Car Championship	Garry Holt	Mitsubishi Lancer Evo X	2013 Australian Manufacturers' Championship
Australian Saloon Car Series	Simon Tabinor	Holden VT Commodore	2013 Australian Saloon Car Series
Australian Superkart Championship	Russell Jamieson	Anderson Maverick-DEA	2013 Australian Superkart Championship
Australian Suzuki Swift Series	Luke Fraser	Suzuki Swift Sport RS	2013 Australian Suzuki Swift Series season
Kerrick Sports Sedan Series	Bruce Banks	Chevrolet Camaro-Chevrolet; Mazda RX-7 turbo Chevrolet Corvette-Chevrolet	2013 Kerrick Sports Sedan Series
Kumho V8 Touring Car National Series	Shae Davies	Ford BA Falcon	2013 Kumho Tyres V8 Touring Car Series
Porsche GT3 Cup Challenge Australia	Richard Muscat	Porsche 911 GT3 Cup Type 997	2013 Porsche GT3 Cup Challenge Australia season
PRB Motorsport Series	Stuart Shirvington	PRB Clubman S3	2013 PRB Motorsport Series
Radical Australia Cup	Neale Muston	Radical SR3	2013 Radical Australia Cup
