= 1985 Australian Manufacturers' Championship =

The 1985 Australian Manufacturers' Championship was a CAMS sanctioned motor racing title for car manufacturers. It was the 15th manufacturers title to be awarded by CAMS and the 6th to carry the Australian Manufacturers' Championship name. All championship rounds were open to cars complying with Australian Touring Car regulations, based on FIA Group A rules.

== Calendar ==
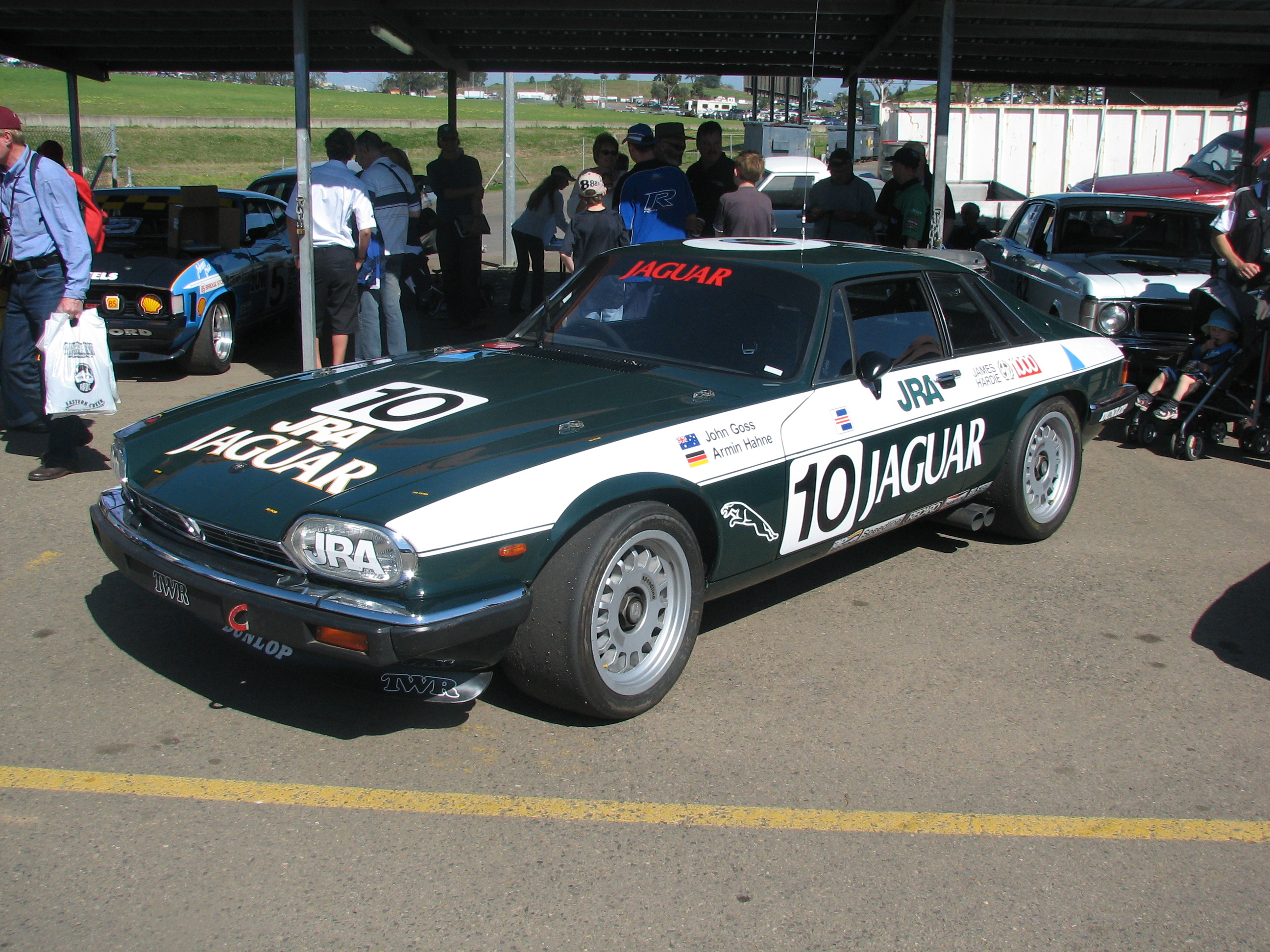
Jaguar placed fifth in the championship with a victory in the James Hardie 1000 by a Jaguar XJ-S

The championship was contested concurrently with the 1985 Australian Endurance Championship over a five-round series with one race per round.

- Round 1, Better Brakes 300, Amaroo Park, New South Wales, 4 August
- Round 2, Pepsi 250, Oran Park, New South Wales, 18 August
- Round 3, Castrol 500, Sandown, Victoria, 15 September
- Round 4, James Hardie 1000, Mount Panorama Circuit, Bathurst, New South Wales, 6 October
- Round 5, Motorcraft 300, Surfers Paradise, Queensland, 27 October

== Class structure ==
Cars were grouped into three engine classes based on engine capacity:

- Up to 2000cc
- 2001 to 3000cc
- 3001 to 6000cc

== Points system ==
Championship points were awarded on a multi scale system for outright places gained at each round:

- Scale A was applied to cars in the Up to 2000cc class
- Scale B was applied to cars in the 2001 to 3000cc class
- Scale C was applied to cars in the 3001 to 6000cc class

Points were awarded only for the highest scoring car from each manufacturer at each round.

Outright Position	1	2	3	4	5	6	8	9	10	11	12	13	14	15	16	17	18	19	20
Scale A	30	27	24	21	19	17	14	13	12	11	10	9	8	7	6	5	4	3	2
Scale B	28	26	23	20	17	15	13	12	11	10	9	8	7	6	5	4	3	2	1
Scale C	25	23	20	17	15	13	10	9	8	7	6	5	4	3	2	1	–	–	–

== Results ==
Position	Manufacturer	Car	R1	R2	R3	R4	R5	Total
1	BMW	BMW 635 CSi	25	25	25	23	25	123
2	General Motors – Holden's	Holden VK Commodore	20	23	15	8	17	83
3	Alfa Romeo	Alfa Romeo GTV6	17	15	20	13	–	65
4	Toyota	Toyota Sprinter, Toyota Celica Supra & Toyota Corolla	15	–	23	5	19	62
5	Jaguar	Jaguar XJ-S	–	15	–	20	13	53
6	Ford	Ford Mustang GT	–	–	–	11	20	46
7	Mitsubishi	Mitsubishi Starion	–	14	–	12	–	31
8	Volvo	Volvo 240 Turbo	–	23	–	–	–	23
9	Mazda	Mazda RX-7	–	–	–	–	–	11
10	Isuzu	Isuzu Gemini ZZ	–	–	10	–	–	10

Note: Only the top ten championship placing are shown in the above table.
