= 2009 Australian Production Car Championship =

The 2009 Australian Production Car Championship was a CAMS sanctioned motor racing title for drivers of Group 3E Series Production Cars. It was the 16th Australian Production Car Championship title to be awarded by CAMS. As well as claiming the Class A2 title, Garry Holt won the overall championship in his BMW 335i. Holt held off Class A1 champion Rod Salmon by just two points in the overall standings. Other class champions were Jake Camilleri in his Mazda 3 MPS (Class B) and Stuart Jones' Toyota Celica (Class C).

== Calendar ==
The championship was contested concurrently with the 2009 Australian Manufacturers' Championship, over a five-round series.

- Round 1, Wakefield Park, New South Wales, 25–26 April
- Round 2, Eastern Creek Raceway, New South Wales, 18–19 July
- Round 3, Morgan Park Raceway, Queensland, 8–9 August
- Round 4, Oran Park Raceway, New South Wales, 29–30 August
- Round 5, Sandown Raceway, Victoria, 28–29 November

Rounds 1 to 4 each comprised three 20-minute races with one driver per car. Round 5 was staged as two x one hour races with one or two drivers per car. The third race of each three race round employed a handicap start.

== Class Structure ==
Cars competed in the following six classes:

- Class A1 : High Performance (All Wheel Drive)
- Class A2 : High Performance (Rear Wheel Drive)
- Class B : Production (Sedan / Hatch)
- Class C : Production Sport
- Class D : Small Cars
- Class E : Alternative Energy

There were no entries for Class D or Class E

== Points system ==
Two points were awarded to the driver setting the fastest qualifying time for each class at each round. For races with standing starts, points were awarded to drivers based on their finishing positions within their class. For races with handicap starts, points were awarded to drivers based on their outright finishing positions. Points were awarded in each race of two race rounds on a 45-36-30-27-24-21-18-15-12-9-6-3 basis with an additional point for each other finisher. Points were awarded in each race of three-race rounds on a 30-24-20-18-16-14-12-10-8-6-4-2 basis with an additional point for each other finisher.

== Results ==
Position	Driver	No.	Car	Class	Entrant	R1	R2	R3	R4	R5	Total
1	Garry Holt	20	BMW 335i	A2	Eastern Creek Int. Karting	82	80	72	68	53	355
2	Rod Salmon	10	Mitsubishi Lancer Evo X	A1	SWIRK.com	71	58	74	58	92	353
3	Lee Castle	25	Subaru Impreza WRX STi	A1	Wilson Brothers Racing	78	36	90	74	60	338
4	Jake Camilleri	36	Mazda 3 MPS	B	Grand Prix Mazda	62	40	82	74	53	311
5	Colin Osborne	13	Toyota Celica	C	Osborne Motorsport	32	57	80	56	14	239
6	Stuart Jones	31	Toyota Celica	C	Osborne Motorsport	60	55	64	39	10	228
7	Steve Glenney	11	Mitsubishi Lancer Evo X	A1	Mt Vincent Racing Team	–	86	–	80	–	166
8	Chris Delfsma	21	FPV BG GT	A2	Century 21 Hazelbrook	50	28	36	42	–	156
9	Steve Briffa	8	HSV VE Clubsport R8	A2	Briffa Smash	58	46	–	48	–	152
10	Peter O'Donnell	28	BMW 130i	B	GWS Personnel	34	19	54	41	1	149
11	Ryan McLeod	46 & 20	Holden Astra & BMW 335i	C & A2	Ryan McLeod & Eastern Creek Int. Karting	–	–	–	86	51	137
12	Tim Sipp	23	HSV VE Clubsport R8	A2	GSK Group	20	–	58	54	–	132
13	Jeremy Gray	67	Ford FG Falcon XR6 Turbo	B	JMG Maint Super Hoist	–	63	–	60	–	123
14	Bob Brewer	60	HSV VY GTS	A2	Professional Traffic Solutions	58	–	–	36	21	115
15	Gerard Keogh	32	HSV VE Clubsport R8	A2	GSK Group	22	–	46	27	–	95
16	Trevor Keene	50	Mini Cooper S	C	Midwest Multimedia	–	39	–	42	9	90
17	Glyn Crimp	55	Mitsubishi Lancer Evo X	A1	West Surfing Products	54	–	–	–	36	90
18	Damien White	10	Mitsubishi Lancer Evo X	A1	SWIRK.com	–	–	–	–	90	90
19	Martin Miller	5	HSV VZ Clubsport	A2	Jost Australia	34	14	–	32	–	80
20	Alan Shephard	27	BMW 130i & Toyota Celica	B & C	GWS Personnel	39	–	–	33	1	73
21	Ian Tulloch	11	Mitsubishi Lancer Evo X	A1		–	–	–	–	72	72
22	Jim Hunter	44	Subaru Impreza WRX STi	A1	Johnson Window Films	–	34	–	35	–	69
23	Mark King	35	Mitsubishi Lancer Evo X	A1	Pro-Duct Motorsport	–	64	–	–	–	64
24	Anthony Loscialpo	37	HSV VY GTS	A2	Excelerate M'sport	–	58	–	–	–	58
25	Jim Pollicina	7	HSV VY Clubsport R8	A2	Poll Performance	–	52	–	–	–	52
26	Shaun Keogh	50	Mini Cooper S	C	Midwest Multimedia	52	–	–	–	–	52
27	Matt Brady	6	Ford BF Falcon XR6 Turbo	B	Graham Lusty Trailers	50	–	–	–	–	50
28	Matt McGill	9	Ford AU Falcon XR8 & FPV BF GT	B & A2	Auto-Motion Australia	37	–	–	–	12	49
29	David Ryan	30	Ford BF Falcon XR6 Turbo	B		–	–	48	–	–	48
30	Terry Conroy	22	Honda Integra Type S	C	Disc Brakes Australia	–	39	–	–	–	39
31	Barrie Nesbitt	56	HSV GTS Coupe	A2	Donut King Monaro Perf	–	38	–	–	–	38
32	Peter Hill	62	Mitsubishi Lancer Evo X	A1	Racing Incident	–	–	–	–	36	36
33	Eric Bana	62	Mitsubishi Lancer Evo X	A1	Racing Incident	–	–	–	–	36	36
34	Bob Pearson	33	Mitsubishi Lancer Evo X	A1	Pro-Duct Motorsport	–	–	–	24	–	24
35	David Giugni	72	Toyota Celica	C	Ferguson Toyota	–	–	–	–	15	15
36	Geoff Kite	88	Holden VZ Commodore	B	G & K Refrigeration	–	–	–	–	12	12
37	Chris Tonna	99	FPV BF GT	A2	Auto-Motion Australia	–	–	–	–	12	12
38	Kym De Britt	70	Holden Astra SRi	C	Infinity Wheels	–	–	–	–	6	6
39	Darren Best	76	Mitsubishi Evo	A1	Best Lifestyle Units	–	–	–	–	2	2

=== Class results ===
Position	Driver	No.	Car	Class	Entrant	R1	R2	R3	R4	R5	Total Total
Class A1: High Performance (All Wheel Drive)
1	Rod Salmon	10	Mitsubishi Lancer Evo X	A1	SWIRK.com	84	62	72	60	90	368
2	Lee Castle	25	Subaru Impreza WRX STi	A1	Wilson Brothers Racing	84	38	90	78	60	350
3	Steve Glenney	11	Mitsubishi Lancer Evo X	A1	Mt Vincent Racing Team	–	90	–	78	–	168
4	Glyn Crimp	55	Mitsubishi Lancer Evo X	A1	West Surfing Products	60	–	–	–	45	105
5	Damien White	10	Mitsubishi Lancer Evo X	A1	SWIRK.com	–	–	–	–	90	90
6	Jim Hunter	44	Subaru Impreza WRX STi	A1	Johnson Window Films	–	34	–	52	–	86
7	Ian Tulloch	11	Mitsubishi Lancer Evo X	A1		–	–	–	–	72	72
8	Mark King	35	Mitsubishi Lancer Evo X	A1		–	68	–	–	–	68
9	Eric Bana	62	Mitsubishi Lancer Evo X	A1	Racing Incident	–	–	–	–	45	45
10	Peter Hill	62	Mitsubishi Lancer Evo X	A1	Racing Incident	–	–	–	–	45	45
11	Bob Pearson	33	Mitsubishi Lancer Evo X	A1	Pro-Duct Motorsport	–	–	–	24	–	24
12	Darren Best	76	Mitsubishi Evo	A1	Best Lifestyle Units	–	–	–	–	22	22
Class A2: High Performance (Rear Wheel Drive)
1	Garry Holt	20	BMW 335i	A2	Eastern Creek Int. Karting	90	90	80	78	90	428
2	Chris Delfsma	21	FPV BG GT	A2	Century 21 Hazelbrook	56	40	48	56	–	200
3	Steve Briffa	8	HSV Clubsport	A2	Briffa Smash	64	56	–	62	–	182
4	Tim Sipp	23	HSV VE Clubsport R8	A2	GSK Group	20	–	74	54	–	148
5	Bob Brewer	60	HSV VY GTS	A2	Professional Traffic Solutions	62	–	–	36	36	134
6	Gerard Keogh	32	HSV VE Clubsport R8	A2	GSK Group	28	–	56	44	–	128
7	Martin Miller	5	HSV VZ Clubsport	A2	Jost Australia	44	14	–	48	–	106
8	Ryan McLeod	20	BMW 335i	A2	Eastern Creek Int. Karting	–	–	–	–	90	90
9	Anthony Loscialpo	37	HSV VY GTS	A2	Excelerate M'sport	–	68	–	–	–	68
10	Jim Pollicina	7	HSV	A2	Poll Performance	–	62	–	–	–	62
11	Barrie Nesbitt	56	HSV GTS Coupe	A2	Donut King Monaro Perf	–	48	–	–	–	48
12	Chris Tonna	99	FPV BF GT	A2	Auto-Motion Australia	–	–	–	–	30	30
13	Matt McGill	99	FPV BF GT	A2	Auto-Motion Australia	–	–	–	–	30	30
Class B: Production (Sedan / Hatch)
1	Jake Camilleri	36	Mazda 3 MPS	B	Grand Prix Mazda	60	54	90	90	90	384
2	Peter O'Donnell	28	BMW 130i	B	GWS Personnel	34	38	72	60	30	234
3	Jeremy Gray	67	Ford FG Falcon XR6 Turbo	B	JMG Maint Super Hoist	–	78	–	72	–	150
4	Alan Shephard	27	BMW 130i	B	GWS Personnel	62	–	–	–	30	92
5	Matt Brady	6	Ford BF Falcon XR6 Turbo	B	Graham Lusty Trailers	78	–	–	–	–	78
6	Matt McGill	9	Ford AU Falcon XR8	B	Auto-Motion Australia	56	–	–	–	–	56
7	David Ryan	30	Ford BF Falcon XR6 Turbo	B		–	68	–	–	–	68
8	Geoff Kite	88	Holden VZ Commodore	B	G & K Refrigeration	–	–	–	–	72	72
9	Nick Kjaer	27	BMW 130i	B	GWS Personnel			30	30		60
10	Bruce Tomlinson	27	BMW 130i	B	GWS Personnel	–	–	–	–	30	30
Class C: Production Sport
1	Stuart Jones	31	Toyota Celica	C	Osborne Motorsport	78	78	72	54	69	351
2	Colin Osborne	13	Toyota Celica	C	Osborne Motorsport	30	72	90	72	36	300
3	Trevor Keene	50	Mini Cooper S	C	Midwest Multimedia	–	58	–	58	30	146
4	Ryan McLeod	46	Holden Astra	C	Ryan McLeod	–	–	–	90	–	90
5	Shaun Keogh	50	BMW Cooper S	C	Midwest Multimedia	74	–	–	–	–	74
6	Terry Conroy	22	Honda Integra Type S	C	Disc Brakes Australia	–	68	–	–	–	68
7	Kym De Britt	70	Holden Astra SRi	C	Infinity Wheels	–	–	–	–	63	63
8	Alan Shephard	27	Toyota Celica	C		–	–	–	50	–	50
9	David Giugni	72	Toyota Celica	C	Ferguson Toyota	–	–	–	–	45	45
