= 2009 Australian Manufacturers' Championship =

The 2009 Australian Manufacturers' Championship was a CAMS sanctioned motor racing title for car manufacturers. It was the 24th manufacturers title to be awarded by CAMS and the 15th to be contested under the Australian Manufacturers' Championship name. The championship was open to Group 3E Series Production Cars. Mitsubishi ended the season as champions, beating other manufacturers Toyota and Subaru.

== Calendar ==
The title was contested over a five-round series run concurrently with the 2009 Australian Production Car Championship.

- Round 1, Wakefield Park, New South Wales, 25–26 April
- Round 2, Eastern Creek Raceway, New South Wales, 18–19 July
- Round 3, Morgan Park Raceway, Queensland, 8–9 August
- Round 4, Oran Park Raceway, New South Wales, 29–30 August
- Round 5, Sandown Raceway, Victoria, 28–29 November

Rounds 1 to 4 were each composed of three "20-minute" races with one driver per car. Round 5 was composed of two "one hour" races with either one or two drivers per car.

== Class Structure ==
Cars competed in the following six classes:

- Class A1 : High Performance (All Wheel Drive)
- Class A2 : High Performance (Rear Wheel Drive)
- Class B : Production (Sedan / Hatch)
- Class C : Production Sport
- Class D : Small Cars
- Class E : Alternative Energy

== Points system ==
Only manufacturers registered for the championship were eligible to score championship points. Each registered manufacturer could nominate up to two cars, irrespective of class, which were the only cars eligible to score points for that manufacturer at that round of the championship.

For races with standing starts, championship points were awarded on class finishing positions and for races with handicap starts on outright finishing positions. For rounds contested over two races, points were awarded on a 45-36-30-27-24-21-18-15-12-9-6-3 basis in each race and for rounds contested over three races on a 30-24-20-18-16-14-12-10-8-6-4-2 basis in each race. All eligible finishers outside of the top twelve in each race were awarded one point each.

== Results ==
| Position | Manufacturer | Driver | No. | Car | R1 | R2 | R3 | R4 | R5 | Total |
| 1 | Mitsubishi | Rod Salmon | 10 | Mitsubishi Lancer Evo X | 84 | 78 | 72 | 58 | 90 | |
| 1 | Mitsubishi | Glyn Crimp | 55 | Mitsubishi Lancer Evo X | 54 | – | – | – | – | |
| 1 | Mitsubishi | Steve Glenney | 11 | Mitsubishi Lancer Evo X | – | 84 | – | 78 | 72 | |
| 1 | Mitsubishi | | | | 138 | 162 | 72 | 136 | 162 | 670 |
| 2 | Toyota | Colin Osborne | 13 | Toyota Celica | 30 | 55 | 78 | 56 | 12 | |
| 2 | Toyota | Stuart Jones | 31 | Toyota Celica | 60 | 55 | 64 | 39 | 10 | |
| 2 | Toyota | | | | 90 | 110 | 142 | 95 | 22 | 459 |
| 3 | Subaru | Lee Castle | 25 | Subaru Impreza WRX STi | 78 | 36 | 90 | 74 | 60 | |
| 3 | Subaru | | | | 78 | 36 | 90 | 74 | 60 | 338 |
