= 1978 Australian Championship of Makes =

The 1978 Australian Championship of Makes was a CAMS sanctioned national motor racing title for car manufacturers. The championship was contested over a five-round series.

- Round 1, ABE Copiers 250, Oran Park, New South Wales, 30 July
- Round 2, Hang Ten 400, Sandown, Victoria, 10 September
- Round 3, Rothmans 250, Adelaide International Raceway, South Australia, 22 October
- Round 4, Rothmans 300, Surfers Paradise, Queensland, 5 November
- Round 5, McEwan Spanners Twin 250, Calder, Victoria, 2 & 3 December

All rounds were contested by Group C Touring Cars which competed in three classes according to engine capacity.

- Up to 2000cc
- 2001 to 3000cc
- 3001 to 6000cc

Championship points were awarded at each round on a 9-6-4-3-2-1 basis for the first six places in each class. Only the best placed car from each manufacturer in each class was eligible to score points and points could not be aggregated across classes.

== Results ==
Position	Make & Model	Class	Rd 1	Rd 2	Rd 3	Rd 4	Rd 5	Total
1	Ford Escort	Up to 2000cc	9	9	9	9	9	45
2	Holden LX Torana SS A9X Hatchback	3001 to 6000cc	9	9	6	9	9	42
2	Ford Capri Mk.I; Ford Capri Mk.II	2001 to 3000cc	9	9	9	9	6	42
4	Mazda RX-3	2001 to 3000cc	3	4	4	3	9	23
5	Alfa Romeo 2000 GTV	Up to 2000cc	6	1	3	4	6	20
6	Ford XB Falcon GT Hardtop; Ford Falcon XC GS500 Hardtop; Ford Falcon XC Cobra	3001 to 6000cc	-	1	9	2	-	12
6	Toyota Celica GT	Up to 2000cc	-	6	-	6	-	12
8	BMW 2002	Up to 2000cc	-	4	1	-	-	5
9	Triumph Dolomite	Up to 2000cc	-	-	4	-	-	4
10	Holden Gemini	Up to 2000cc	-	-	2	-	-	2
10	Honda Civic	Up to 2000cc	-	-	-	-	2	2
