= Australian Manufacturers' Championship =

Australian motor racing competition

- Category: Production Car Racing
- Country: Australia
- Inaugural season: 1971
- Folded: 2015
- Official website: amchamp.com.au

The Australian Manufacturers' Championship was a motor racing title awarded by the Confederation of Australian Motor Sport (CAMS) to the winning car manufacturer in an annual series of races held throughout Australia. Whilst the first two championships were open only to Group E Series Production Touring Cars subsequent championships through to 1991 were run to the same regulations as the Australian Touring Car Championship. The title has been revived twice since then, firstly in 1994 as a championship open to 2-litre Class II Touring Cars (soon to become known as Super Touring Cars) and from 2008 as a series for production cars, incorporating the Australian Production Car Championship.

For 2016 the Australian Manufacturers' Championship has been replaced by the Australian Production Car Series.

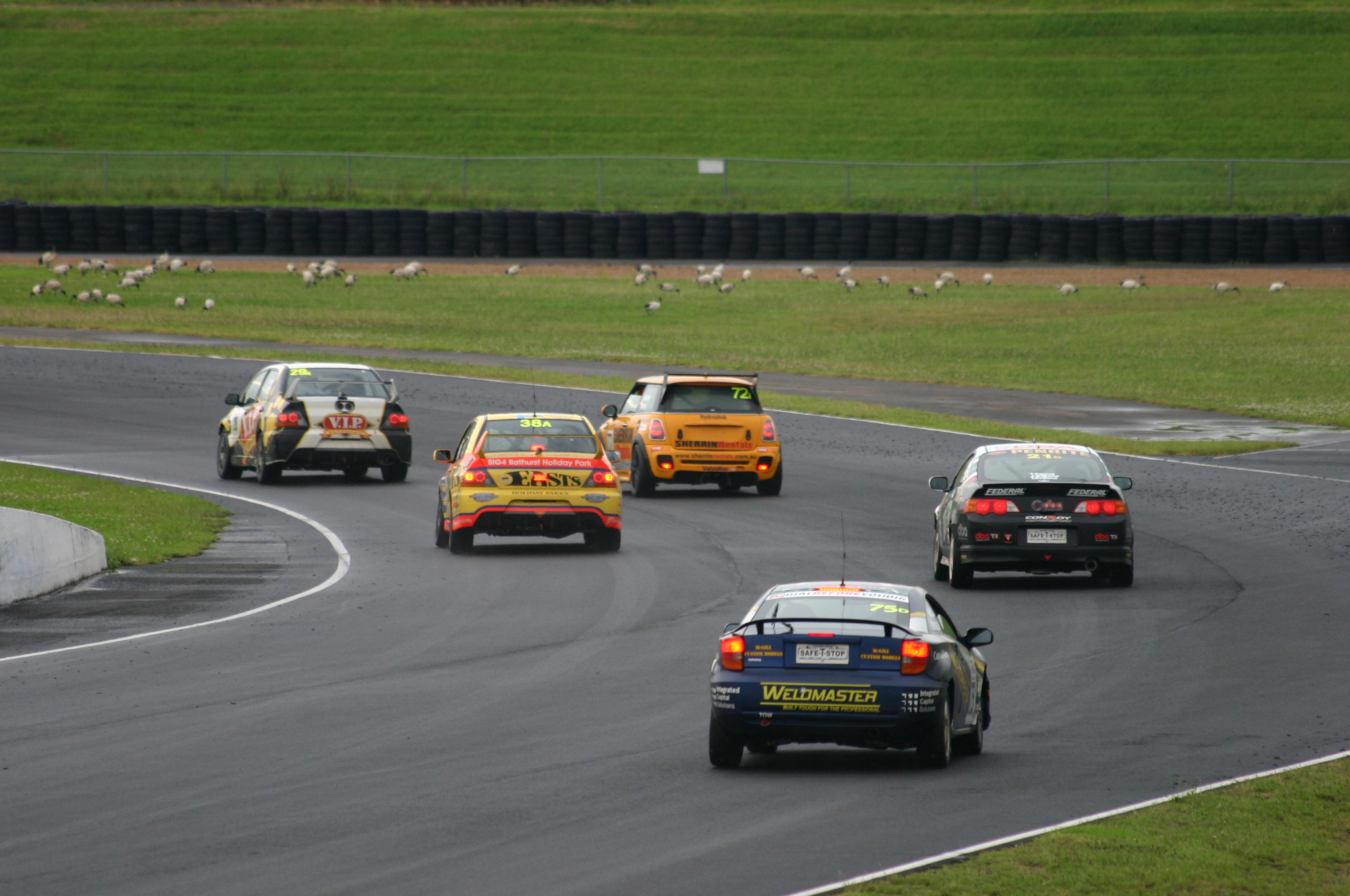
Australian Manufacturers' Championship cars competing in a 6-hour race at Sydney Motorsport Park in 2011.

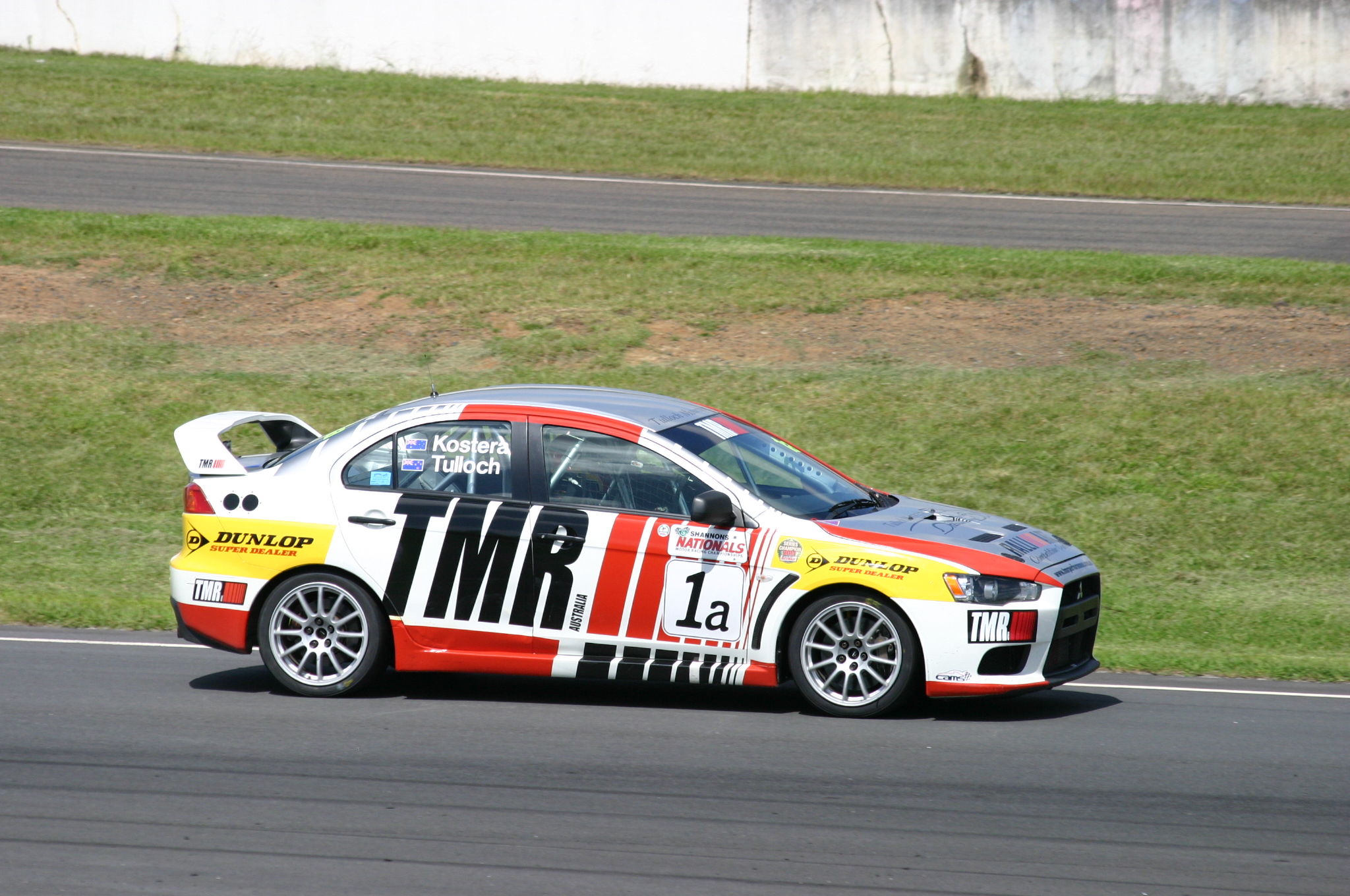
Mitsubishi dominated the championship from 2009 to 2013 with the Lancer Evolution.

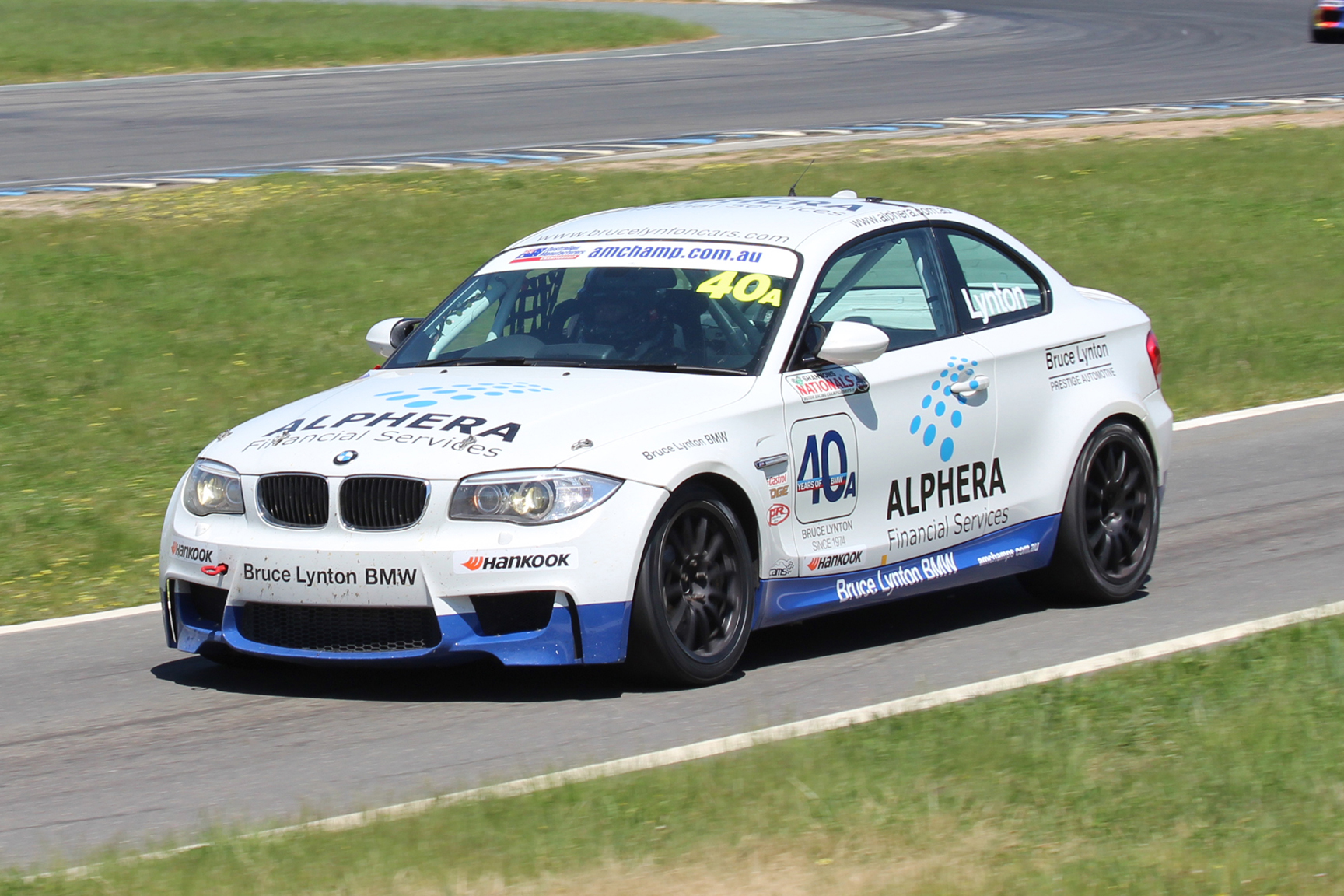
BMW won the championship in 2014 with various models including the 1M, pictured above

== Results ==
The actual name of the title was changed by CAMS a number of times as shown in the following table of championship winners.

Year	Championship	Champion
1971	Australian Manufacturers' Championship	General Motors-Holden
1972	Australian Manufacturers' Championship	Ford Motor Co of Australia
1973	Australian Manufacturers' Championship	General Motors-Holden
1974	Australian Manufacturers' Championship	General Motors-Holden
1975	Australian Manufacturers' Championship	General Motors-Holden
1976	Australian Championship of Makes	General Motors-Holden
1977	Australian Championship of Makes	Ford Motor Co of Australia
1978	Australian Championship of Makes	Ford Motor Co of Australia
1979	Australian Championship of Makes	General Motors-Holden
1980	Australian Championship of Makes	General Motors-Holden
1981	Australian Endurance Championship	Toyota (Australia)
1982	Australian Endurance Championship of Makes	Nissan Motor Co (Australia)
1983	Australian Endurance Championship of Makes	General Motors-Holden; Toyo Kogyo (Mazda)
1984	Australian Endurance Championship of Makes	Toyo Kogyo (Mazda)
1985	Australian Manufacturers' Championship	BMW (Aust) Pty Ltd
1986	Australian Manufacturers' Championship	Nissan Motor Co (Australia)
1987	Australian Manufacturers' Championship	BMW (Australia) Pty Ltd; Nissan Motor Co (Australia)
1988	Australian Manufacturers' Championship	Ford Motor Co of Australia; Toyota Motor Corp Australia Ltd; BMW (Australia) Pty Ltd
1989	Australian Manufacturers' Championship	Toyota Motor Corp Australia Ltd
1990	Australian Manufacturers' Championship	Ford Motor Co of Australia
1991	Australian Manufacturers' Championship	Nissan Motor Co (Australia)
1992–1993	Not Contested	
1994	Australian Manufacturers' Championship: Champion Driver	BMW (Australia) Pty Ltd; Tony Longhurst (BMW 318i)
1995–2007	Not Contested	
2008	Australian Manufacturers' Championship	Hyundai Australia
2009	Australian Manufacturers' Championship	Mitsubishi Australia Ltd
2010	Australian Manufacturers' Championship	Mitsubishi Australia Ltd
2011	Australian Manufacturers' Championship	Mitsubishi Australia Ltd
2012	Australian Manufacturers' Championship	Mitsubishi Australia Ltd
2013	Australian Manufacturers' Championship	Mitsubishi Australia Ltd
2014	Australian Manufacturers' Championship	BMW
2015	Australian Manufacturers' Championship	BMW Australia Pty Ltd

== See also ==
- List of Australian Manufacturers' Championship races
