= 2014 Australian Manufacturers' Championship =

The 2014 Australian Manufacturers' Championship was an Australian motor racing series for modified production touring cars. It comprised three CAMS sanctioned national championship titles:

- The 2014 Australian Manufacturers' Championship for automobile manufacturers
- The 2014 Australian Production Car Championship for drivers
- The 2014 Australian Endurance Championship for drivers

The 2014 Australian Manufacturers' Championship was the 29th manufacturers title to be awarded by CAMS and the 20th to be contested under the Australian Manufacturers' Championship name. The 2014 Australian Production Car Championship was the 21st Australian Production Car Championship and the 2014 Australian Endurance Championship was the 12th Australian Endurance Championship.

Australian Manufacturers Championship Pty Ltd was appointed by CAMS as the Category Manager for the championship.

The Manufacturers title was won by BMW, the Production Car title by Beric Lynton (BMW 1M), and the Endurance title by Grant Sherrin (BMW 135i).

== Class structure ==
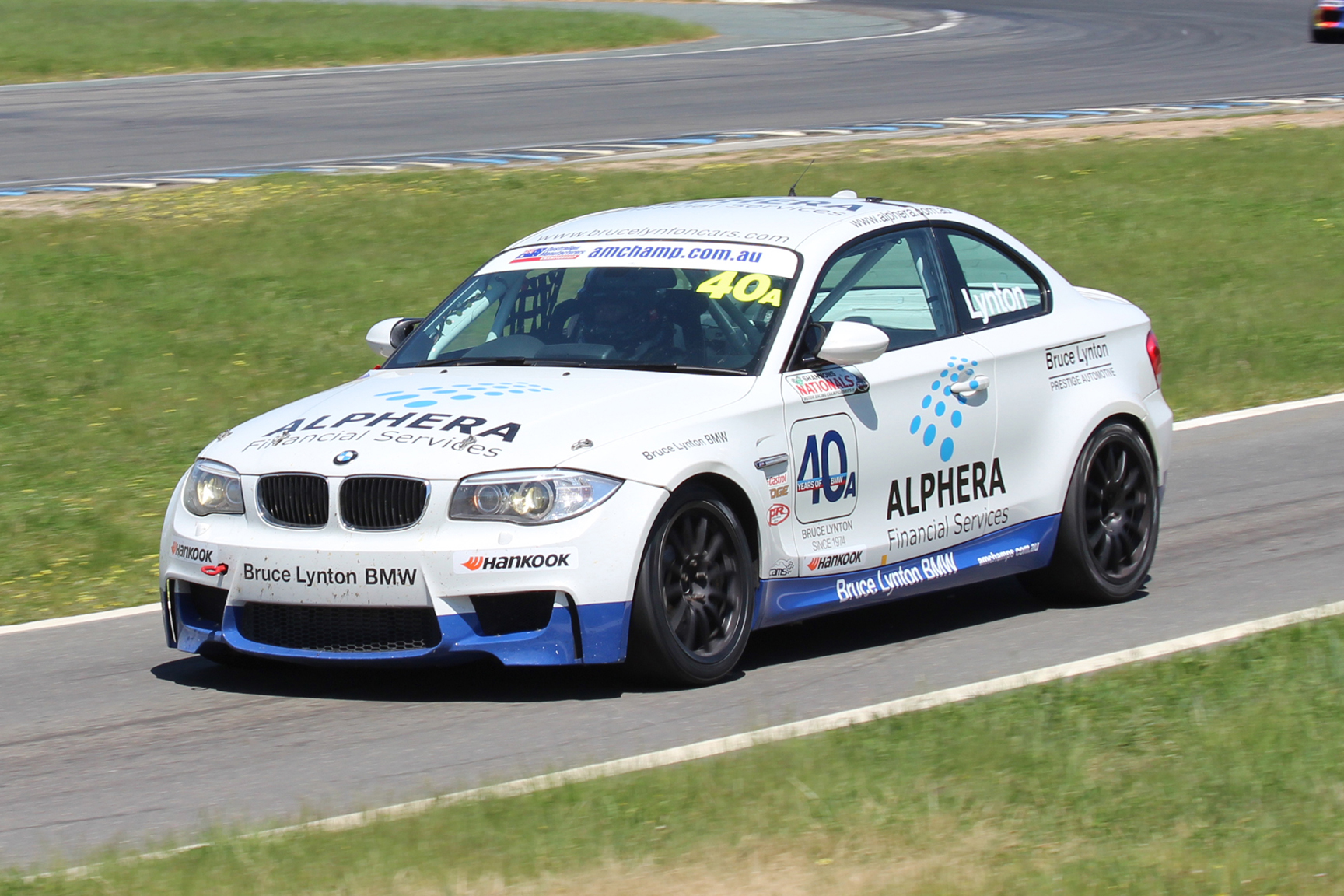
Beric Lynton (BMW 1M) at the Wakefield Park round. BMW was awarded the Manufacturers' Championship and Lynton won the Production Car Championship title.

Cars competed in the following six classes:

- Class A : Extreme Performance
- Class B : High Performance
- Class C : Performance Touring
- Class D : Production Touring
- Class E : Compact Touring
- Class I : Invitational

A seventh class – Class F – for hybrid or alternative energy vehicles, had no competitors.

== Calendar ==
The championship was contested over a five round series.

Round	Name	Circuit	Date	Format	Winning drivers	Car	Report
1	Sandown 3 Hour Classic	Sandown	28–30 March	1 x 3 hours	Rob Marshall; Shane Marshall	Mitsubishi Lancer Evolution X	
2	Great Southern Four Hour	Phillip Island	23–25 May	1 x 4 hours	Bob Pearson; Glenn Seton	Mitsubishi Lancer Evolution X	Report
3	Australian Four Hour	Sydney Motorsport Park	11–13 July	1 x 4 hours	Garry Holt; Stuart Kostera	Mitsubishi Lancer Evolution X	
4		Queensland Raceway	8–10 August	2 x 200 km	Garry Holt; Stuart Kostera	Mitsubishi Lancer Evolution X	
5		Wakefield Park	17–19 October	2 x 200 km	Beric Lynton	BMW 1M	

The results for each Round of the Championship were determined by the number of points scored by each driver at that round.

== Points system ==
Each manufacturer was able to score points towards the Australian Manufacturers' Championship title from the two highest placed automobiles of its make, in any class, excluding Class I. The title was awarded to the manufacturer scoring the highest total number of class points over all rounds of the championship.

- In rounds with one scheduled race, points were awarded to manufacturers on a 120–90–72–60–54–48–42–36–30–24–18–12–6 basis for the first thirteen places in each class with 3 points for other finishers.
- In rounds with two scheduled races, points were awarded to manufacturers on a 60–45–36–30–27–24–21–18–15–12–9–6–3 basis for the first thirteen places in each class in each race with 2 points for other finishers.

Points towards the Australian Production Car Championship outright title were awarded to drivers based on outright finishing positions attained in each race. Points were awarded using the same two scales as used for the Australian Manufacturers' Championship with the addition of two points for the driver setting the fastest qualifying lap in each class at each round.

Points towards the Australian Production Car Championship class titles were awarded to drivers based on class finishing positions attained in each race. Points were awarded using the same two scales as used for the Australian Manufacturers' Championship with the addition of two points for the driver setting the fastest qualifying lap in each class at each round.

Points towards the Australian Endurance Championship outright title were awarded to drivers based on outright finishing positions attained in each of the first three single-race rounds. Points were awarded using the same scale as used for the Australian Manufacturers' Championship with the addition of two points for the driver setting the fastest qualifying lap in each class at each round.

Points towards the Australian Endurance Championship class titles were awarded to drivers based on class finishing positions attained in each of the first three single-race rounds. Points were awarded using the same scale as used for the Australian Manufacturers' Championship with the addition of two points for the driver setting the fastest qualifying lap in each class at each round.

== Results ==
=== Australian Manufacturers' Championship ===
Position	Manufacturer	Vehicle	San	Phi	Syd	Que	Wak	Total
1	BMW	BMW 1M; BMW 135i BMW 335i BMW M130i; BMW 130i	222	162	300	318	486	1488
2	Honda	Honda Integra	210	78	48	186	252	774
3	Mazda	Mazda 3 MPS; Mazda 323 Astina	192	90	54	186	216	738
4	Mitsubishi	Mitsubishi Lancer Evolution X	120	180	120	156	90	666
5	Toyota	Toyota 86 GTS	72	42	24	96	90	324
6	Renault	Renault Mégane RS265	90	3	0	90	0	183
7	Audi	Audi TT RS	0	0	30	45	72	147
8	Ford	Ford Falcon XR6 Turbo; FPV FG GT	54	18	0	66	0	138

=== Australian Production Car Championship ===
==== Outright ====
Position	Driver	No.	Vehicle	Competitor / Team	Points
1	Beric Lynton	40	BMW 1M	Alphera Financial Services	363
2	Grant Sherrin	18	BMW 135i	Sherrin Rentals	356
3	Iain Sherrin	18	BMW 135i	Sherrin Rentals	348
4	Stuart Kostera	20	Mitsubishi Lancer Evolution X	Eastern Creek Karts	336
5	Garry Holt	20	Mitsubishi Lancer Evolution X	Eastern Creek Karts	330
6	Jake Camilleri	36	Mazda 3 MPS	Grand Prix Mazda	229
7	Robert Marshall	22	Mitsubishi Lancer Evolution X	Melbourne Performance Centre	210
8	Shane Marshall	22	Mitsubishi Lancer Evolution X	Melbourne Performance Centre	210
9	Kevin Herben	14	Honda Integra	Dynagrip Aust / Kandi Warehousing	185
10	Tim Leahey	40	BMW 1M	Alphera Financial Services	180
11	Matthew Cherry	55	BMW 1M; Audi TT RS	Kintyre Racing	165
12	Ric Shaw	35	BMW M130i	Sennheiser / Ric Shaw Racing	156
13	Michael Sloss	35	BMW M130i	Sennheiser / Ric Shaw Racing	156
14	Nick Lange	31	Mazda 3 MPS	Osborne Motorsport	156
15	Luke King	14	Honda Integra	Dynagrip Aust / Kandi Warehousing	146
16	Andrew Turpie	86	Toyota 86 GTS	Pedders / ToyotsRUs Racing	134
17	Grant Phillips	86	Toyota 86 GTS	Pedders / ToyotsRUs Racing	132
18	Colin Osborne	13	Mazda 3 MPS	Osborne Motorsport	132
19	Scott Nicholas	36	Mazda 3 MPS	Grand Prix Mazda	126
20	Jake Williams	21	Honda Integra	Disc Brakes Australia	125
21	Bob Pearson	33	Mitsubishi Lancer Evolution X	Castrol / Turbosmart / DBA / Bilstein	122
22	Mark Eddy	88	Renault Mégane RS265	Network Clothing/Dentbuster	121
23	Glenn Seton	33	Mitsubishi Lancer Evolution X	Castrol / Turbosmart / DBA / Bilstein	120
24	Glyn Crimp	55	BMW 1M; Audi TT RS	Kintyre Racing	120
25	Francois Jouy	88	Renault Mégane RS265	Network Clothing / Dentbuster	117
26	Geoff Rands	21	Honda Integra	Disc Brakes Australia	84
27	Brock Giblin	31	Mazda 3 MPS	Osborne Motorsport	78
28	Luke Searle	62	BMW M135i	Roadchill Express	74
29	Barry Graham	62	BMW M135i	Roadchill Express	72
30	Peter O'Donnell	28	BMW 335i	GWS Personnel	63
31	Tony Alford	54	BMW 1M	Donut King	60
32	Ryan McLeod	54	BMW 1M	Donut King	60
33	George Karadimas	34	Ford Falcon XR6 Turbo	AAW Australian Auto Wreckers	60
34	Rick Bates	13	Mazda 3 MPS	Osborne Motorsport	54
35	Latt Lehmann	34	Ford Falcon XR6 Turbo	AAW Australian Auto Wreckers	42
36	Richard Gartner	28	BMW 335i	GWS Personnel	36
37	Michael Caine	28	BMW 335i	GWS Personnel	36
38	Gus Robbins	42	Mazda 323 Astina	Disc Brakes Australia	29
39	Anthony Gilbertson	28	BMW 335i	GWS Personnel	24
40	Michael Benton	11	FPV FG GT	Lovton Coal	21
41	Geoff Russell	11	FPV FG GT	Lovton Coal	21
42	Allan Shephard	27	BMW 130i	GWS Personnel	21
43	William Gauchi	27	BMW 130i	GWS Personnel	21
44	Matthew Mackelden	40	BMW 1M	Alphera Financial Services	18
45	Lauren Gray	34	Ford Falcon XR6 Turbo	AAW Australian Auto Wreckers	18
46	Michael Gray	34	Ford Falcon XR6 Turbo	AAW Australian Auto Wreckers	18
47	Bronte Michael	21	Honda Integra	Disc Brakes Australia	18
48	Terry Conroy	42	Mazda 323 Astina	Disc Brakes Australia	9
49	Mark Griffith	36	Mazda 3 MPS	Grand Prix Mazda	6
50	Michael Sherrin	19	BMW 135i	Sherrin Rentals	6
51	David Ayers	19	BMW 135i	Sherrin Rentals	6
52	John Bowe	28	BMW 335i	GWS Personnel	3

==== Class ====
Position	Driver	No.	Vehicle	Competitor / Team	Points
Class A
1	Beric Lynton	40	BMW 1M	Alphera Financial Services	417
2	Stuart Kostera	20	Mitsubishi Lancer Evolution X	Eastern Creek Karts	338
3	Garry Holt	20	Mitsubishi Lancer Evolution X	Eastern Creek Karts	330
4	Matthew Cherry	55	BMW 1M; Audi TT RS	Kintyre Racing	267
5	Robert Marshall	22	Mitsubishi Lancer Evolution X	Melbourne Performance Centre	228
6	Shane Marshall	22	Mitsubishi Lancer Evolution X	Melbourne Performance Centre	228
7	Glyn Crimp	55	BMW 1M; Audi TT RS	Kintyre Racing	222
8	Tim Leahey	40	BMW 1M	Alphera Financial Services	180
9	Bob Pearson	33	Mitsubishi Lancer Evolution X	Castrol / Turbosmart / DBA / Bilstein	122
10	Glenn Seton	33	Mitsubishi Lancer Evolution X	Castrol / Turbosmart / DBA / Bilstein	120
11	Matthew Mackelden	40	BMW 1M	Alphera Financial Services	72
12	Tony Alford	54	BMW 1M	Donut King	72
13	Ryan McLeod	54	BMW 1M	Donut King	72
Class B
1	Grant Sherrin	18	BMW 135i	Sherrin Rentals	578
2	Iain Sherrin	18	BMW 135i	Sherrin Rentals	570
3	Peter O'Donnell	28	BMW 335i	GWS Personnel	207
4	Michael Sherrin	19	BMW 135i	Sherrin Rentals	135
5	David Ayers	19	BMW 135i	Sherrin Rentals	135
6	Luke Searle	62	BMW 135i	Roadchill Express	122
7	Barry Graham	62	BMW 135i	Roadchill Express	120
8	Richard Gartner	28	BMW 335i	GWS Personnel	90
9	Michael Caine	28	BMW 335i	GWS Personnel	90
10	John Bowe	28	BMW 335i	GWS Personnel	72
11	Anthony Gilbertson	28	BMW 335i	GWS Personnel	45
12	Michael Benton	11	FPV FG GT	Lovton Coal	36
13	Geoff Russell	11	FPV FG GT	Lovton Coal	36
Class C
1	Jake Camilleri	36	Mazda 3 MPS	Grand Prix Mazda	478
2	Ric Shaw	35	BMW M130i	Sennheiser / Ric Shaw Racing	375
3	Michael Sloss	35	BMW M130i	Sennheiser / Ric Shaw Racing	375
4	Nick Lange	31	Mazda 3 MPS	Osborne Motorsport	324
5	Colin Osborne	13	Mazda 3 MPS	Osborne Motorsport	282
6	Scott Nicholas	36	Mazda 3 MPS	Grand Prix Mazda	240
7	Mark Eddy	88	Renault Mégane RS265	Network Clothing/Dentbuster	232
8	Francois Jouy	88	Renault Mégane RS265	Network Clothing/Dentbuster	228
9	George Karadimas	34	Ford Falcon XR6 Turbo	AAW Australian Auto Wreckers	171
10	Brock Giblin	31	Mazda 3 MPS	Osborne Motorsport	162
11	Rick Bates	13	Mazda 3 MPS	Osborne Motorsport	120
12	Matt Lehmann	34	Ford Falcon XR6 Turbo	AAW Australian Auto Wreckers	114
13	Allan Shephard	27	BMW 130i	GWS Personnel	63
14	William Gauchi	27	BMW 130i	GWS Personnel	63
15	Lauren Gray	34	Ford Falcon XR6 Turbo	AAW Australian Auto Wreckers	60
16	Michael Gray	34	Ford Falcon XR6 Turbo	AAW Australian Auto Wreckers	57
17	Mark Griffith	36	Mazda 3 MPS	Grand Prix Mazda	54
Class D
1	Kevin Herben	14	Honda Integra	Dynagrip Aust / Kandi Warehousing	509
2	Andrew Turpie	86	Toyota 86 GTS	Pedders / ToyotsRUs Racing	440
3	Grant Phillips	86	Toyota 86 GTS	Pedders / ToyotsRUs Racing	438
4	Luke King	14	Honda Integra	Dynagrip Aust / Kandi Warehousing	334
5	Jake Williams	21	Honda Integra	Disc Brakes Australia	314
6	Geoff Rands	21	Honda Integra	Disc Brakes Australia	192
7	Bronte Michael	21	Honda Integra	Disc Brakes Australia	81
8	Gus Robbins	21	Honda Integra	Disc Brakes Australia	81
Class E
1	Gus Robbins	42	Mazda 323 Astina	Disc Brakes Australia	122
2	Terry Conroy	42	Mazda 323 Astina	Disc Brakes Australia	120
Class I
1	Mike Eady	32	Mini Challenge	Carter Garage	122
2	Daniel Stutterd	32	Mini Challenge	Carter Garage	120
3	Aaron Seton	33	Mitsubishi Lancer Evolution X	Castrol / Turbosmart / DBA / Bilstein	62

=== Australian Endurance Championship ===
The Australian Endurance Championship was awarded to the driver who scored the highest total number of outright points over Rounds 1, 2 & 3 of the Championship.

A Class award for the Australian Endurance Championship was presented to each driver who scored the highest total number of points for each Class, excluding Class I over the first three rounds of the Championship.

Class	Driver	No.	Vehicle	Competitor / Team
Outright	Grant Sherrin	18	BMW 135i	Sherrin Rentals
Class A	Beric Lynton	40	BMW 1M	Alphera Financial Services
Class B	Grant Sherrin	18	BMW 135i	Sherrin Rentals
Class C	Jake Camilleri	36	Mazda 3 MPS	Grand Prix Mazda
Class D	Luke King	14	Honda Integra	Dynagrip Aust / Kandi Warehousing
