= 2014 Great Southern 4 Hour =

Motor race in Australia

The 2014 Great Southern 4 Hour was a motor race staged at the Phillip Island Grand Prix Circuit in Victoria, Australia on 25 May 2014. It was Round 2 of the 2014 Australian Manufacturers' Championship and as such it was open to modified production touring cars complying with the technical regulations for that championship.

The race was won by Bob Pearson and Glenn Seton driving a Mitsubishi Lancer Evolution X, repeating their 2013 Great Southern 4 Hour victory.

== Classes ==
As the race was a round of the 2014 Australian Manufacturers' Championship, cars competed in the following classes:

- Class A - Extreme Performance
- Class B - High Performance
- Class C - Performance Touring
- Class D - Production Touring
- Class E - Compact Touring (no entries)
- Class F - Hybrid/Alternative Energy (no entries)
- Class I - Invitational

== Results ==
Position	Drivers	No.	Vehicle	Competitor / Team	Class	Laps
1	Bob Pearson, Glenn Seton	33	Mitsubishi Lancer Evolution X	Castrol / Turbosmart / DBA / Bilstein	A	121
2	Beric Lynton, Tim Leahey	40	BMW 1M	Alphera Financial Services	A	121
3	Grant Sherrin, Iain Sherrin	18	BMW 135i	Sherrin Rentals	B	121
4	Shane Marshall, Robert Marshall	22	Mitsubishi Lancer Evolution X	Melbourne Performance Centre	A	121
5	Colin Osborne, Rick Bates	13	Mazda 3 MPS	Osborne Motorsport	C	116
6	Kevin Herben, Luke King	14	Honda Integra (fourth generation)	Kandi Warehousing	D	115
7	Grant Phillips, Andrew Turpie	86	Toyota 86 GTS	Pedders / ToyotasRS Racing	D	114
8	Nick Lange, Brock Giblin	31	Mazda 3 MPS	Osborne Motorsport	C	114
9	Jake Williams, Geoff Rands	21	Honda Integra (fourth generation)	Disc Brakes Australia	D	114
10	Rick Shaw, Michael Sloss	35	BMW 130i	Sennheiser / Ric Shaw Racing	C	113
11	George Karadimas, Matt Lehmann, Lauren Gray	34	Ford Falcon XR6 Turbo	AAW Australian Auto Wreckers	C	112
12	Daniel Stutterd, Mike Eady	32	Mini Challenge	Carter Grange	I	109
13	Jake Camilleri, Mark Griffin	36	Mazda 3 MPS	Grand Prix Mazda	C	108
14	Michael Sherrin, David Ayres	19	BMW 135i	Sherrin Rentals	B	107
15	Peter O'Donnell, John Bowe	28	BMW 335i	GWS Personnel	B	105
16	Mark Eddy, Francois Jouy	88	Renault Megane RS265	Network Clothing / Dentbuster	C	97
DNF	Garry Holt, Stuart Kostera	20	Mitsubishi Lancer Evolution X	Eastern Creek Karts	A	97
DNF	Tony Alford, Ryan McLeod	54	BMW 1M	Donut King	A	67
DNF	Glyn Crimp, Matthew Cherry	55	BMW 1M	Kintyre Racing	A	53

Notes:

- Winner's race time: 3:51:04.0546 (140 km/h)
- Fastest race lap: Car no 33: 1:45.2551 (152 km/h)
