= Ford Falcon XR6 =

High-performance variant of the Ford Falcon

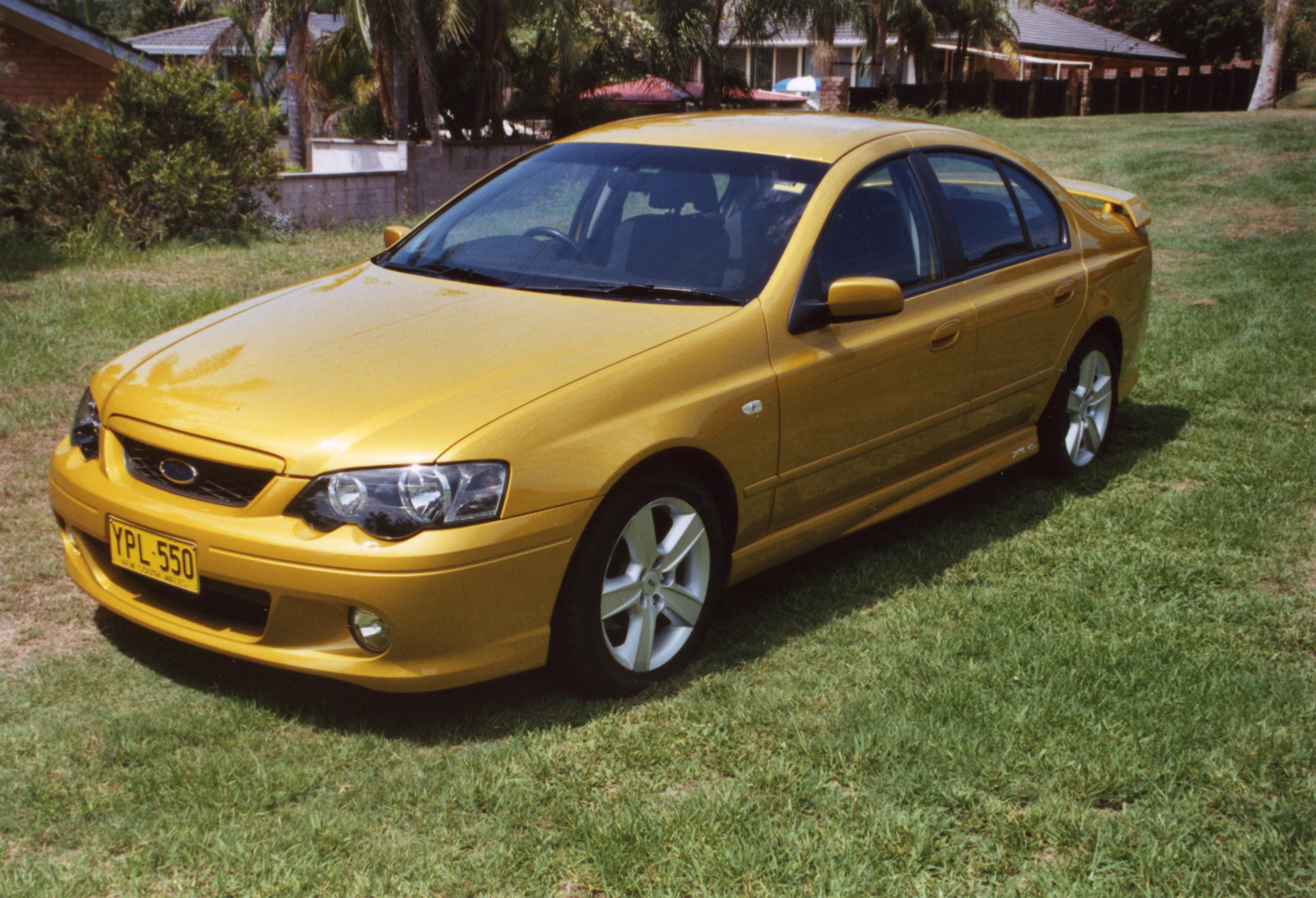
- 2003 Ford Falcon (BA) XR6 Turbo sedan

Overview
- Manufacturer: Ford Australia
- Also called: Ford Falcon S XR6
- Production: October 1992 – October 2016

Body and chassis
- Class: Full-size sports sedan
- Body style: 4-door sedan; 2-door coupé utility (1993–2016); 2-door cab chassis (2006, 2008–2016); 5-door station wagon (1993–1995)
- Layout: Front engine, rear-wheel drive layout
- Related: Ford Falcon; Ford Falcon XR8

Chronology
- Predecessor: Ford Falcon (EB) SS

The Ford Falcon XR6 is a six cylinder sports sedan based on the Falcon. It was produced by Ford Australia from 1992 to 2016. A turbocharged model, the XR6 Turbo was introduced in 2002.

== First generation (1992–1998) ==
=== EB (1992; S XR6) ===
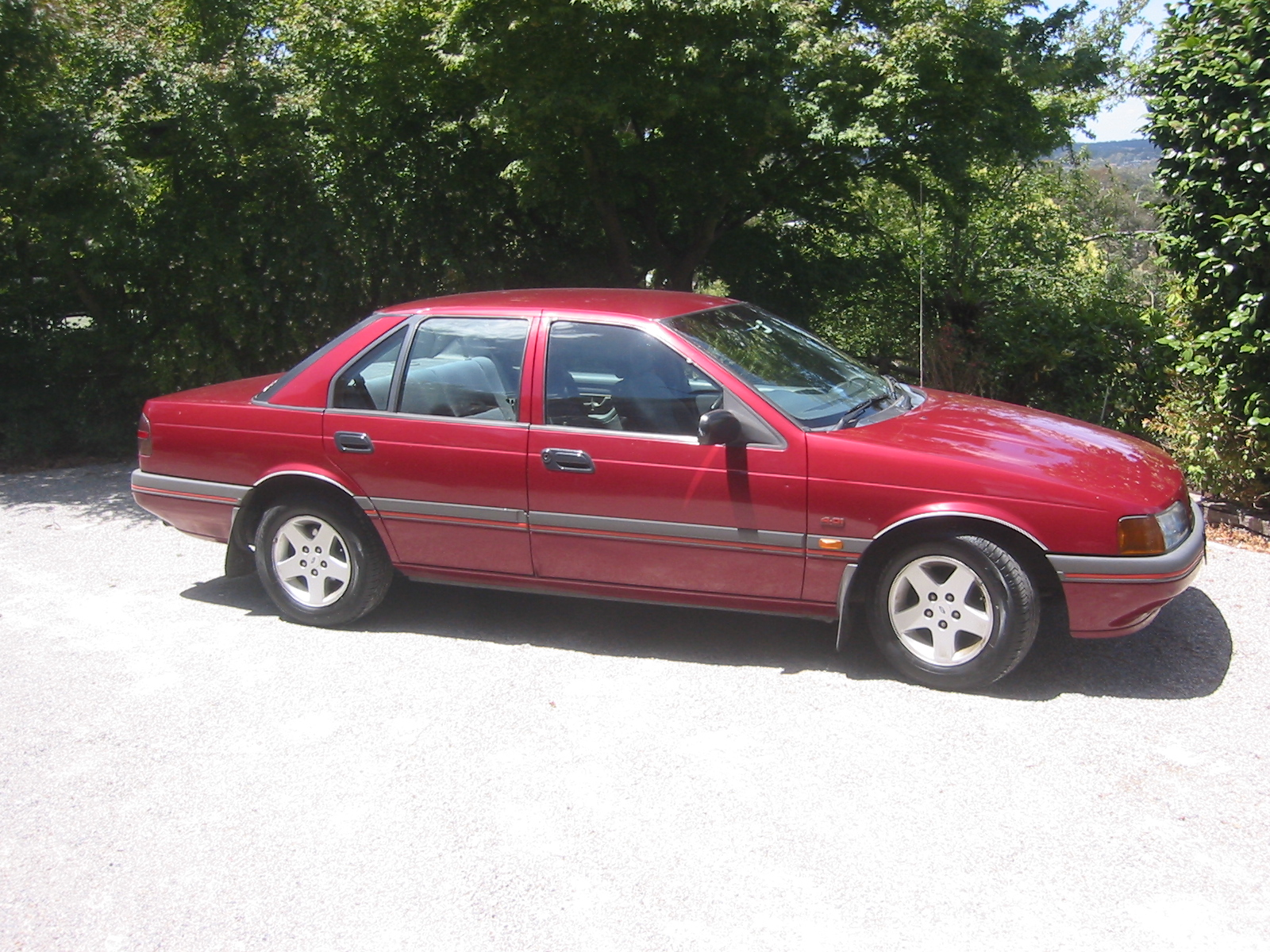
Ford Falcon (EB II) S XR6 sedan

The Ford Falcon S XR6 was released in October 1992, in the EB II series. The suspension and engine was tuned by Tickford Vehicle Engineering. It was powered by a 4.0-litre Ford straight-six (I6) producing 161 kW (216 hp) and 365 N⋅m (269 lb⋅ft), increasing the power by 13 kW (17 hp) from the base engine.

=== ED (1993) ===
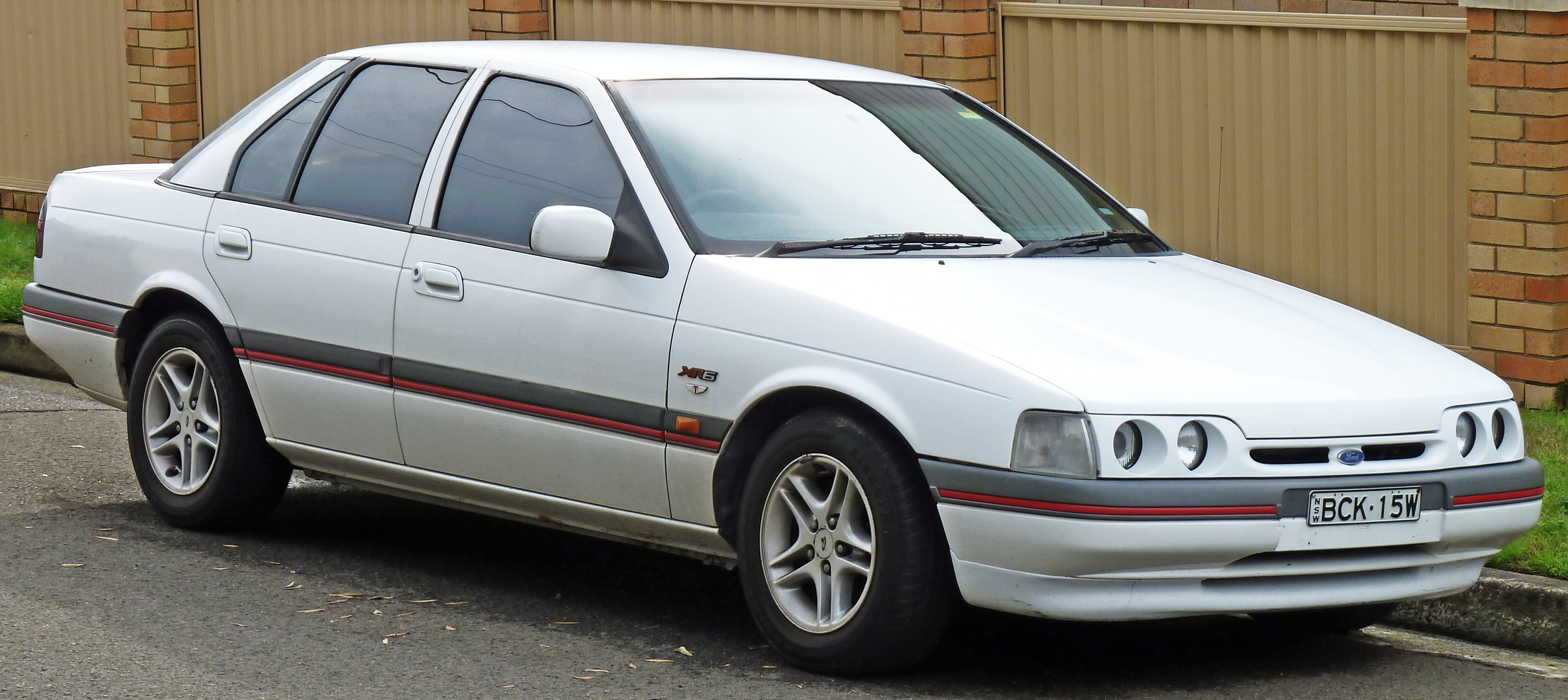
Ford Falcon (ED) XR6 sedan

The Ford Falcon (EB) XR6 was released in August 1993, dropping the S prefix from the name. It featured quad headlights, and introduced the XR6 wagon. It was powered by a 4.0L I6 producing 161 kW (216 hp).

=== XG (1993; XR6 utility) ===
The Ford Falcon (XG) XR6 Utility was released in 1993. It was powered by a 4.0L I6 producing 161 kW (216 hp), and had reduced the payload of 560 kg (1,235 lb).

=== EF (1994) ===
The Ford Falcon (EF) XR6 was released in 1994. It was powered by a 4.0L I6 producing 164 kW (220 hp) and 366 N⋅m (270 lb⋅ft) of torque. The EF II series released in 1995 and discontinued the wagon variant. Compared to the regular engine in the Falcon, exhaust valve size was increased from 39 mm (1.5 in) to 41 mm (1.6 in), and increased the compression ratio from 9.3:1 to 9.35:1.

=== EL (1996) ===
The Ford Falcon (EL) XR6 was released in 1996. It was powered by a 4.0L I6 producing 164 kW (220 hp). It used a one-piece bushing in the lower control arm, rather than the three-piece bushing in the regular Falcon.

=== XH (1996; XR6 utility) ===
The Ford Falcon (XH) XR6 utility released in 1996. It was powered by a 4.0L I6 producing 164 kW (220 hp), and had a reduced payload of 530 kg (1,168 lb). The XH II series released in 1997, and increased the payload by 30 kg (66 lb).

== Second generation (1998–2008) ==
=== AU (1998) ===
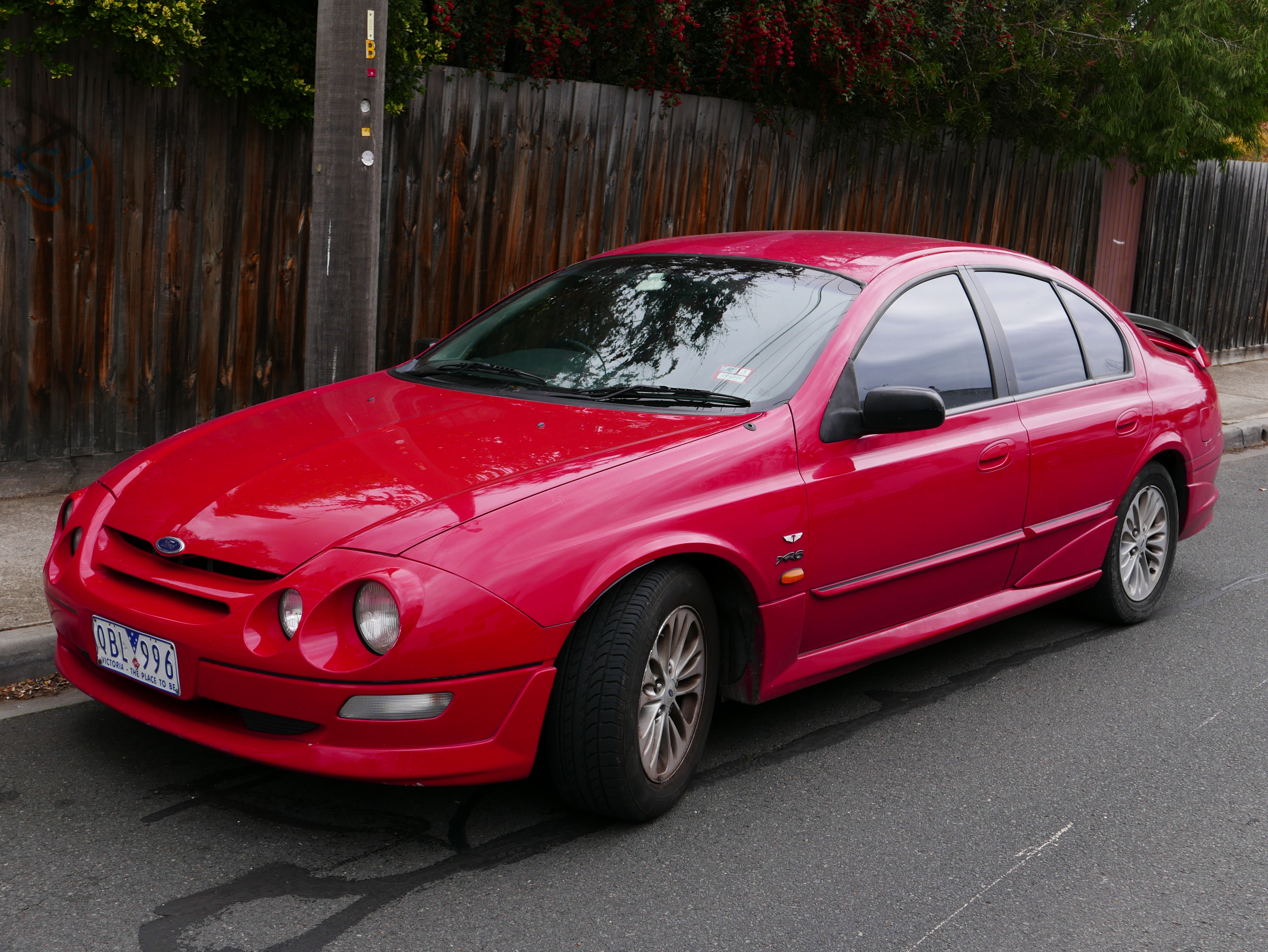
Ford Falcon (AU) XR6 sedan

The Ford Falcon (AU) XR6 was released in 1998. It was powered by a 4.0L I6 producing 164 kW (220 hp), with an increased compression ratio of 9.6:1. The XR6 VCT was powered by a 4.0L I6 with variable camshaft timing producing 172 kW (231 hp) and 374 N⋅m (276 lb⋅ft) of torque, and featured independent rear suspension as standard. The XR6 utility had a payload of 530 kg (1,168 lb).

=== BA (2002) ===
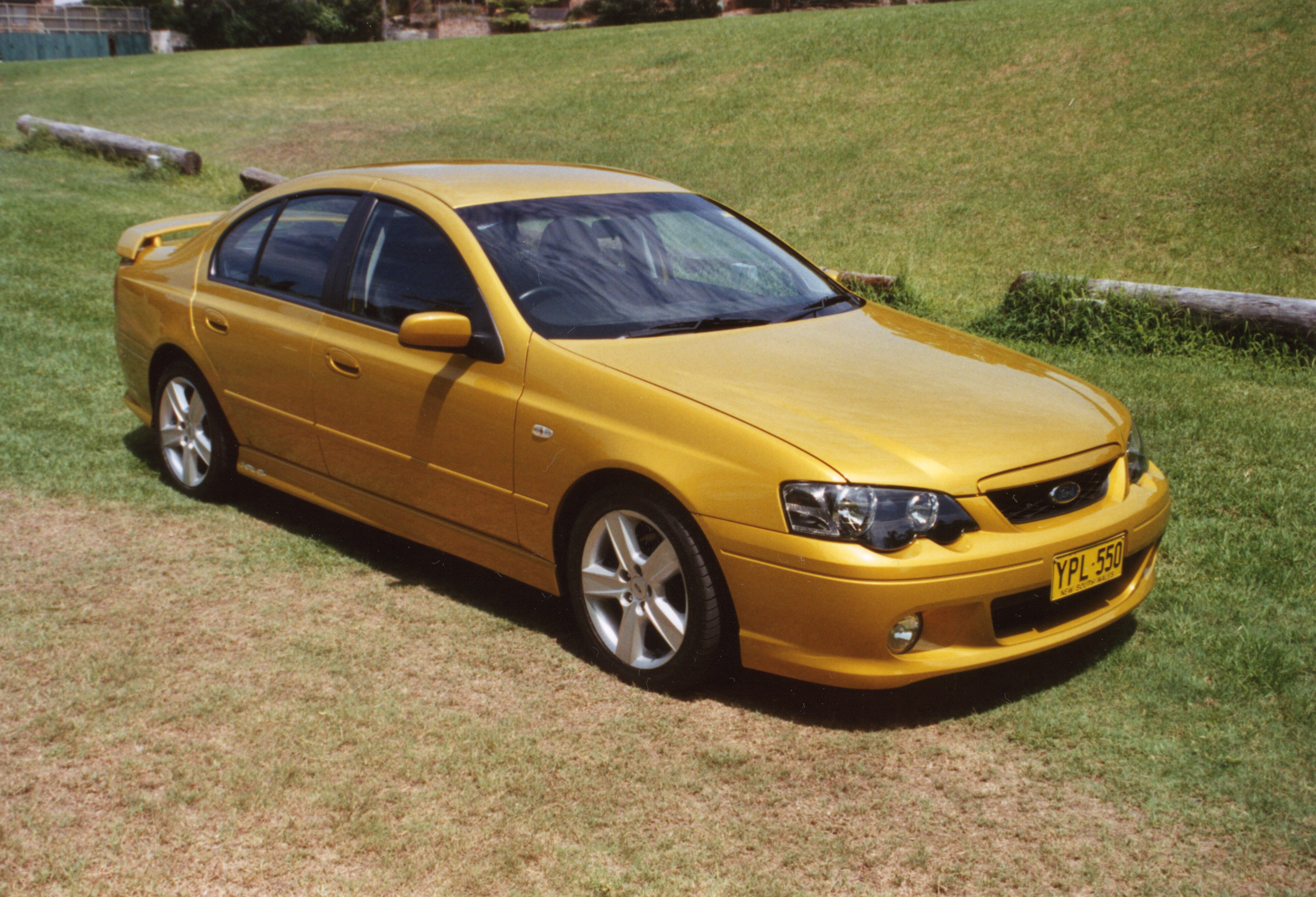
Ford Falcon (BA) XR6 Turbo sedan

The Ford Falcon (BA) XR6 was released in 2002. It was powered by the same 4.0-litre Ford Barra engine as the base sedan, the Barra 182 producing 182 kW (244 hp) and 380 N⋅m (280 lb⋅ft) of torque. It featured a new headlight design with cut-aways under them into the bumper, changing from the previous quad headlight design.

The XR6 Turbo was introduced, powered by a turbocharged Barra 240T engine producing 240 kW (322 hp) and 450 N⋅m (332 lb⋅ft) of torque. It featured a limited-slip differential and recalibrated traction control.

=== BF (2005) ===
The Ford Falcon (BF) XR6 was released in 2005. It was powered by a 4.0L Barra 190 producing 190 kW (255 hp) and 383 N⋅m (282 lb⋅ft) of torque, the XR6 Turbo was powered by the Barra 245T producing 245 kW (329 hp) and 480 N⋅m (354 lb⋅ft) of torque.

A cab chassis variant of the XR6 utility was released in May 2006, as the 'Tradesman' special edition. The LPG-only Barra E-Gas was available as an option, and produced 156 kW (209 hp) and 370 N⋅m (273 lb⋅ft).

== Third generation (2008–2016) ==
=== FG (2008) ===
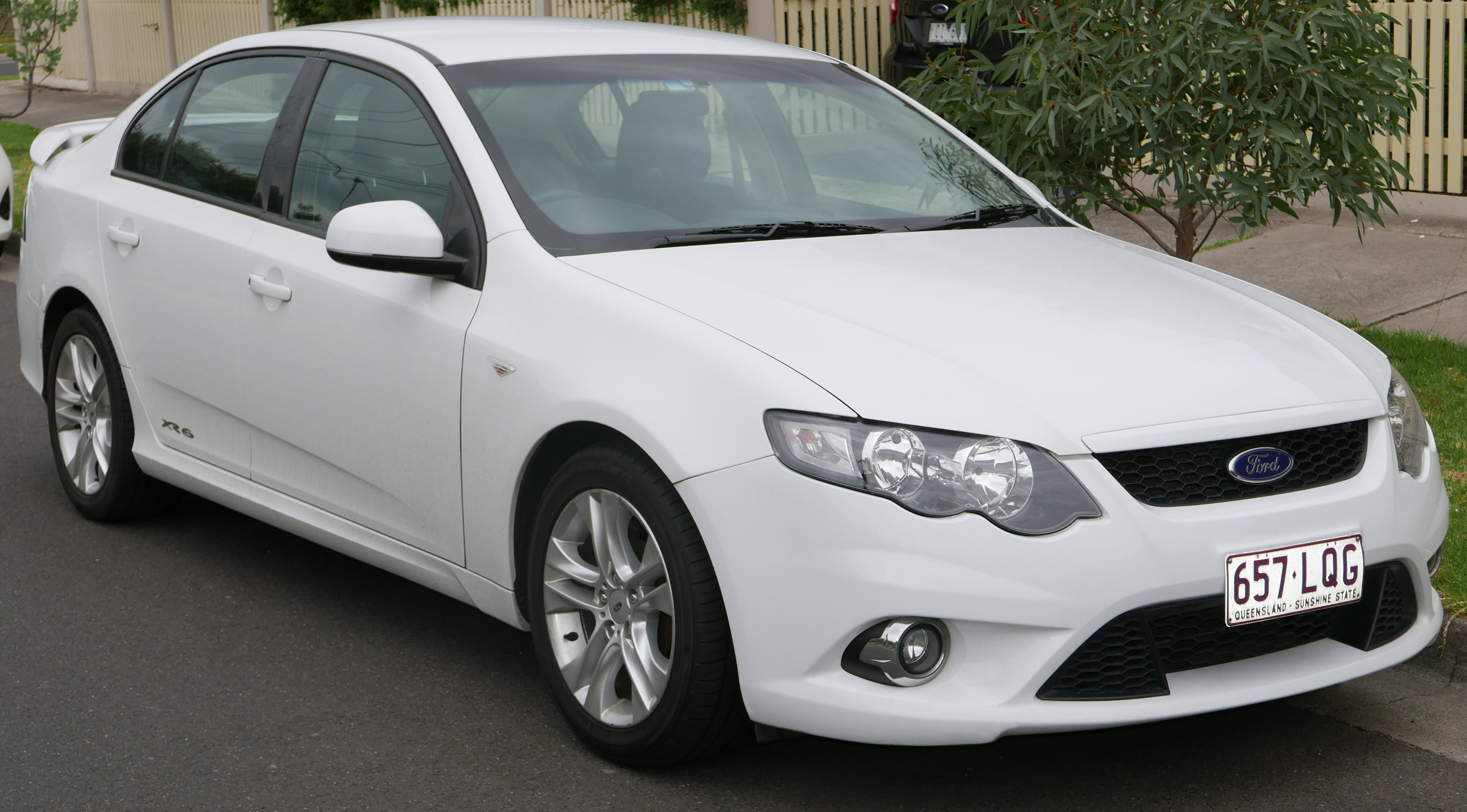
Ford Falcon (FG) XR6 sedan

The Ford Falcon (FG) XR6 was released in 2008. It was powered by a 4.0L Barra 195 producing 195 kW (261 hp) and 391 N⋅m (288 lb⋅ft) of torque. The XR6 Turbo was powered by the Barra 270T producing 270 kW (362 hp) and 533 N⋅m (393 lb⋅ft). The XR6 Turbo featured overboost, allowing it to produce 10 per cent more power for several seconds.

The XR6 utility was available in styleside and cab chassis, the XR6 Turbo utility was only available in styleside. The XR6 cab chassis was able to be optioned with one-tonne suspension, which increases the payload capacity to 1,240 kg (2,734 lb) and the gross combination mass to 4,890 kg (10,781 lb).

The LPG-only Barra E-Gas engine was available as an option for the XR6, with the engine producing 156 kW (209 hp). In 2011 it was replaced by the Barra EcoLPi, producing 198 kW (266 hp) and 409 N⋅m (302 lb⋅ft).

=== FG X (2014) ===
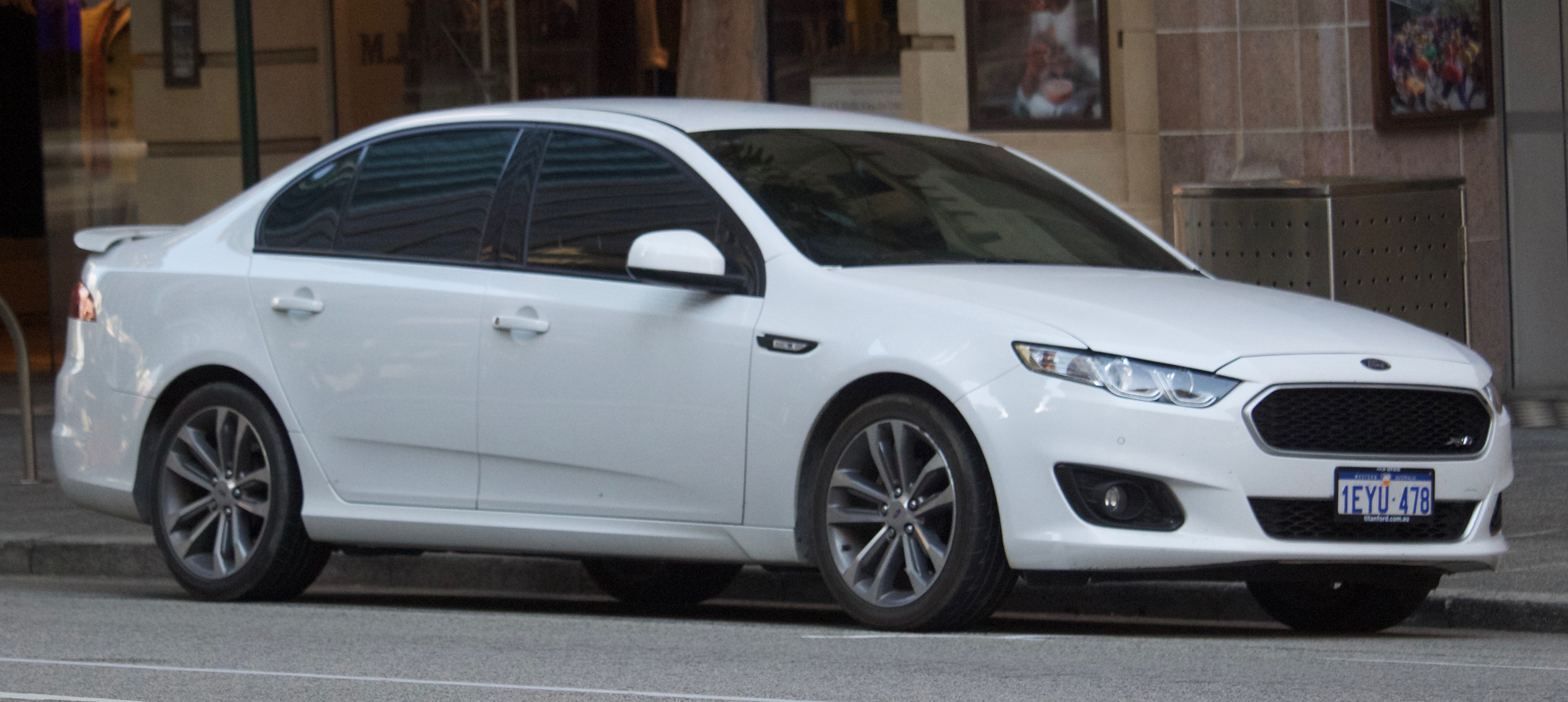
Ford Falcon (FG X) XR6 sedan

The Ford Falcon (FG X) was released in 2014. It was powered by a 4.0L Barra 195 producing 195 kW (261 hp) or a Barra EcoLPi producing 198 kW (266 hp). The XR6 Turbo was powered by the Barra 270T producing 270 kW (362 hp).

The special edition XR6 Sprint was released in 2016. It was powered by the Barra 325T, producing 325 kW (436 hp) and 576 N⋅m (425 lb⋅ft) of torque. It featured an airbox made of carbon fibre, and an overboost feature. With overboost it produces 370 kW (496 hp) and 650 N⋅m (479 lb⋅ft) of torque for ten seconds. It was limited to 550 units, with 50 units being sent to New Zealand. The Sprint nameplate was previously used for a special edition AU Falcon, the XR6 VCT Sprint.

A blue XR6 was the final car manufactured by Ford Australia, rolling off the production line at the Broadmeadows Assembly Plant on 7 October 2016.

== See also ==
- Ford Falcon GT
