= Mazdaspeed3 =

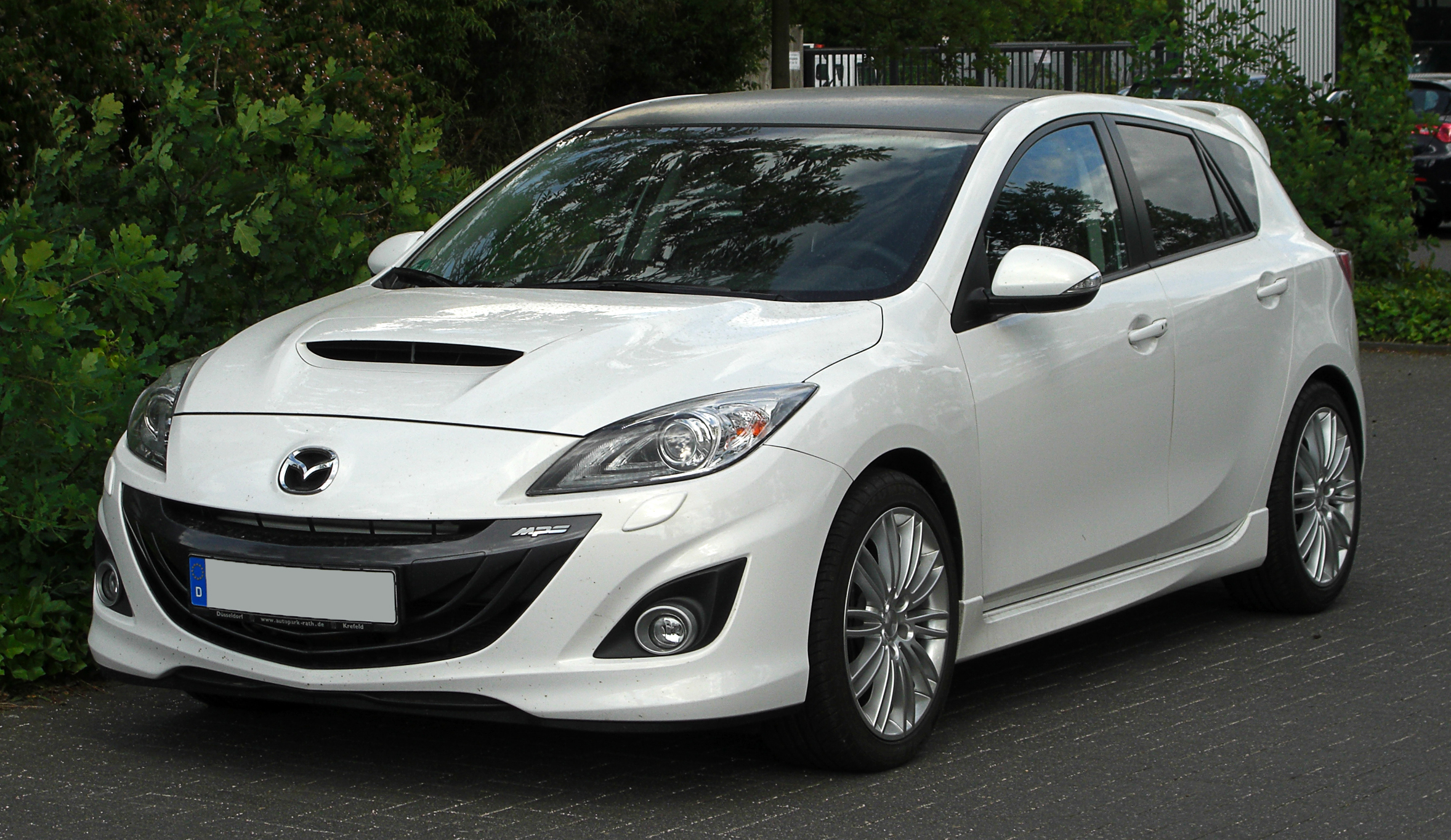

Overview
- Manufacturer: Mazdaspeed (Mazda)
- Also called: Mazda3 MPS (Europe, South Africa and Australia); Mazdaspeed Axela (Japan)
- Production: 2007–2013
- Model years: 2007–2013
- Assembly: Hofu, Japan (Hofu Plant)

Body and chassis
- Class: Sport compact hatchback (C)
- Body style: 4-door hatchback
- Layout: Front-engine, front-wheel-drive
- Related: Mazda3

Powertrain
- Engine: 2.3L MZR L3-VDT petrol I4 turbo
- Transmission: 6-speed manual

The Mazdaspeed3 is a sport compact hatchback introduced for the 2007 model year by Mazdaspeed and produced until 2013. The Mazdaspeed3 is a performance-enhanced version of the 5-door Mazda3.

Mazda unveiled the Mazda3 MPS (Mazda Performance Series) at the 2006 Geneva Motor Show in February. The same model is sold in North America as the Mazdaspeed3 and as the Mazdaspeed Axela in Japan. The vehicle is front-wheel drive and powered by a 2.3 litres (2,261 cc) turbocharged inline-four gasoline engine. The Mazdaspeed3 was designed prior to the latest generation of hot hatches, including the Dodge Caliber SRT4, Ford Focus ST, and the Volkswagen Golf/Rabbit GTI. The engine produces a power output of 263 hp (196 kW) and 280 lb⋅ft (380 N⋅m) of torque. The Mazdaspeed3 also features a limited-slip differential.

The Mazdaspeed3 is the company's first hot hatchback since the BG Familia GT-X of the early 1990s.

== First generation (2007–2009) ==
First generation (BK)
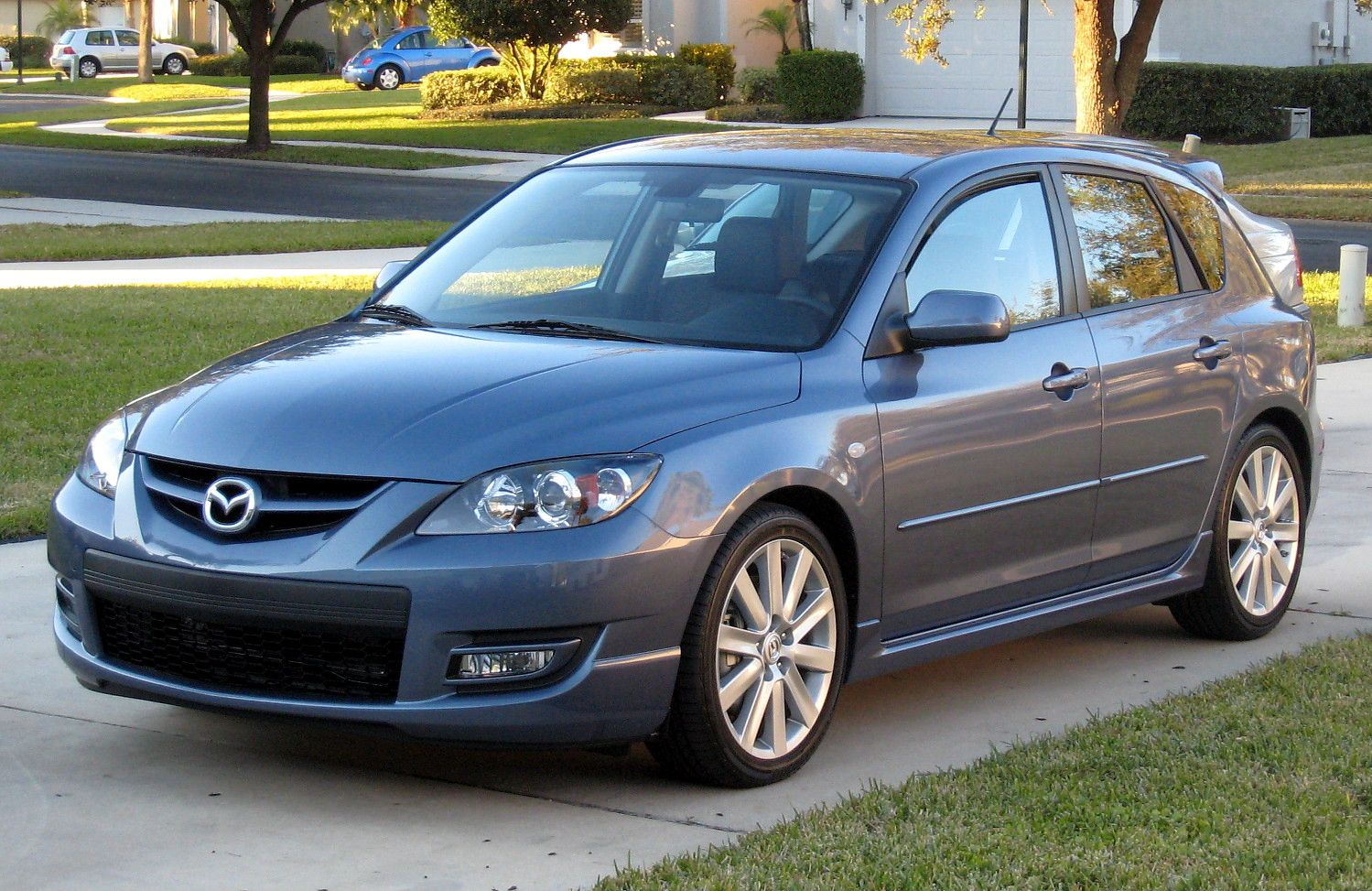

Overview
- Production: 2007–2009

Dimensions
- Wheelbase: 2,640 mm (103.9 in)
- Length: 4,485 mm (176.6 in)
- Width: 1,755 mm (69.1 in)
- Height: 1,465 mm (57.7 in)
- Curb weight: 1,445 kg (3,185 lb)

The Mazdaspeed3 features the same turbocharged 2.3-liter MZR L3-VDT I4 engine from the Mazdaspeed Atenza (known as Mazdaspeed6 in North America and Mazda 6 MPS in Europe, South Africa, and Australia). In this application, it produces 263 bhp (267 PS; 196 kW) and 280 lb⋅ft (380 N⋅m) when running on 91 octane gasoline ((R+M)/2). This is routed through the front wheels rather than the complex all-wheel drive system found on the Mazdaspeed Atenza. The Australian market receives the Mazda3 MPS with the same engine as the Mazda6 MPS with power output of 190 kW (255 hp). The engine was listed in Ward's 10 Best Engines for three years straight. A GKN limited-slip differential is standard, along with a six-speed manual transmission, anti-lock brakes, traction control and dynamic stability control. No automatic transmission option was offered. To limit wheel slip, boost in the first gear will be limited to produce a maximum of 230 hp (172 kW), boost in second gear is also limited. The amount of boost reduction is determined by the gear selection and steering angle. There is no reduction of boost third or above.

It uses the five-door hatchback body of the Mazda3, though it has extra structural bracing and subtle exterior styling differences. Volvo-sourced 320 mm (13 in) front and 280 mm (11 in) rear brake discs hide under 457 mm (18.0 in) wheels.

Critical reception has been generally very positive, with automotive writers praising the car's balance of good performance and low cost. A review by Edmunds.com compared the vehicle favorably to some more expensive rivals, saying "It's a lot of machine for the money and it offers the same balance of speed, practicality and value we've found previously only in the Mitsubishi Lancer Evolution or Subaru WRX STI."

In several road tests, the Mazdaspeed3 accelerated from 0 to 60 mph (97 km/h) in under six seconds, with skidpad numbers in the 0.87g to 0.91 g range. A 1/4 mile (402 m) time of 14.0 at 101 mph (163 km/h).

=== Trim levels ===
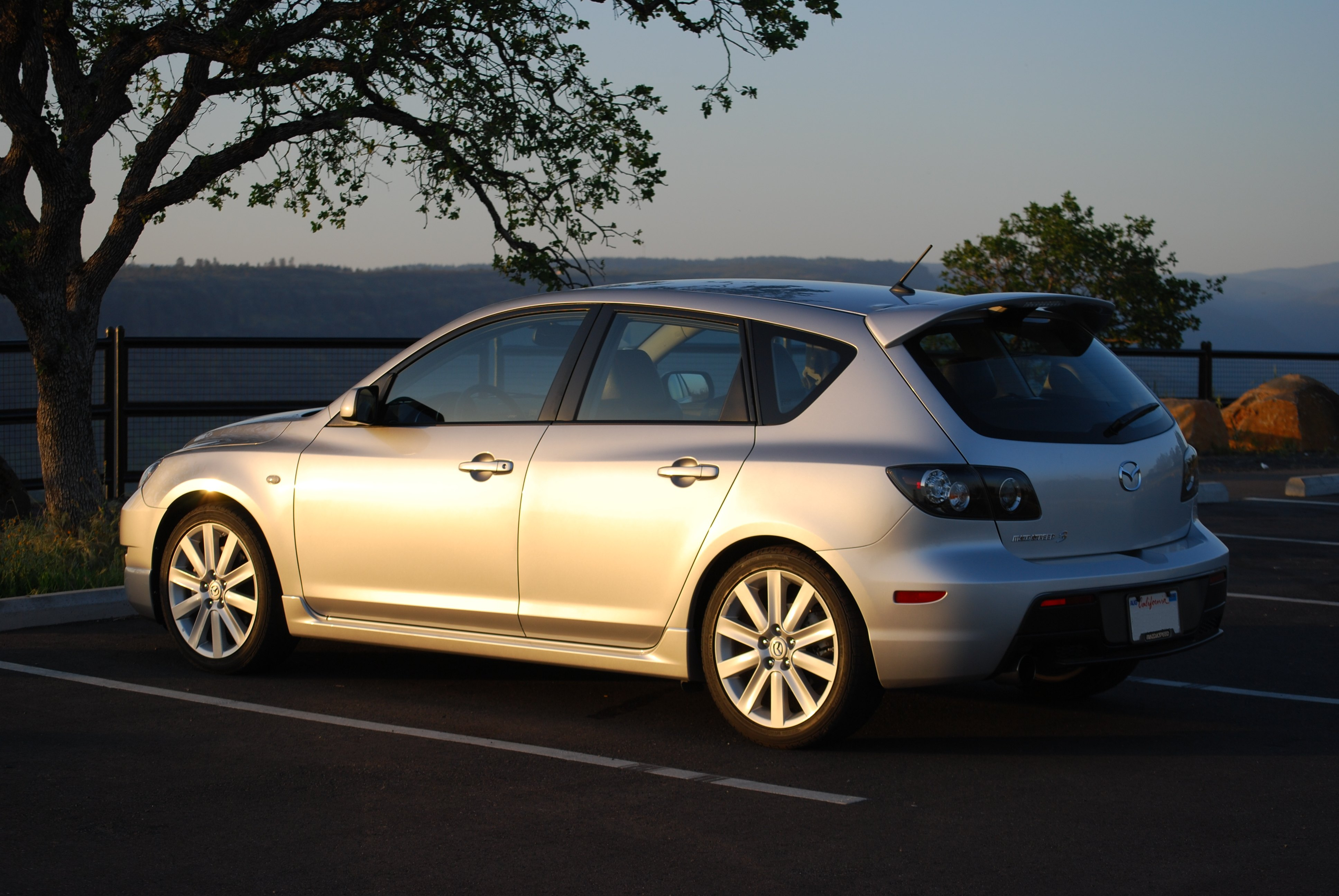
2008 Mazdaspeed3 Grand Touring (USA)

Mazda offered two trim levels with the Mazdaspeed3. The Grand Touring model has few outwardly visible differences from the Mazdaspeed3 Sport, but includes leather and lycra weave logo-embroidered racing seats, Bose stereo with 6-CD in-dash changer, automatic Xenon headlamps with manual leveling control, LED tail lights (the main visible difference), and rain-sensing windshield wipers.

The Mazdaspeed3 Sport and GT both include front and side driver and passenger airbags, air-curtains, logo-embroidered racing seats, signature red-stitched seams throughout, logo sill-plates, aluminium GT-style pedals, steering-wheel audio and cruise controls, automatic climate control and 18 inch by 7 inch wide aluminum alloy wheels. Additional cross-members within the chassis frame and body stiffen the vehicle to improve handling and control under heavy braking and acceleration in addition to quelling torsional flex. ABS brakes assist corner and wet-weather braking, lateral and through-ventilated disc brakes on all wheels provide extreme stopping power with reduced fade. DSC and Traction Control on all Speed3 models is also standard.

The JDM Mazdaspeed Axela models retained similar features to the Mazdaspeed 3 and Mazda3 MPS, They differed by all models featuring keyless entry and start, automatic Xenon headlamps, rain-sensing windshield wipers, and LED tail lights, with the options for the Bose stereo and/or the Leather and Alcantara seats and doorcards. There was no option for cruise controls and only Bose stereo optioned cars received steering wheel audio controls

The AU/NZ DM Mazda3 Sporthatch MPS was again similar to the other markets, They did not receive the keyless entry system, automatic headlamps, or rain-sensing windshield wipers. All models featured cruise controls, half leather seats, and headlamp washers, and there was the option for the Bose stereo and/or the Leather and Alcantara seats and doorcards.

In late 2007, All markets besides AU/NZ received an interior facelift. This changed the interior accent color from silver to piano black, and the seat and doorcard color from silver to black.

== Second generation (2010–2013) ==
Second generation (BL)
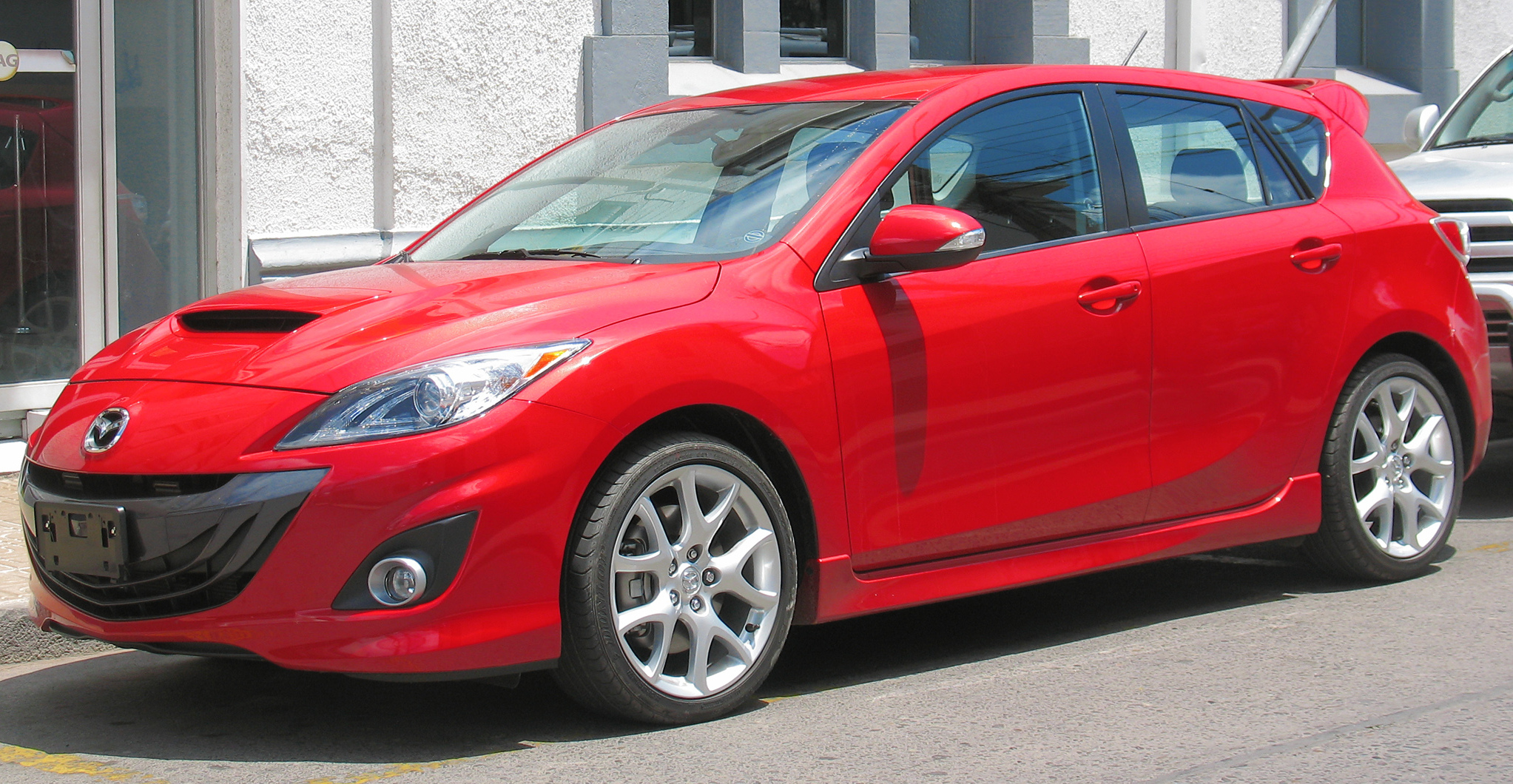

Overview
- Production: 2010–2013

Dimensions
- Wheelbase: 2,640 mm (103.9 in)
- Length: 4,510 mm (177.6 in)
- Width: 1,770 mm (69.7 in)
- Height: 1,460 mm (57.5 in)
- Curb weight: 1,490 kg (3,284 lb)

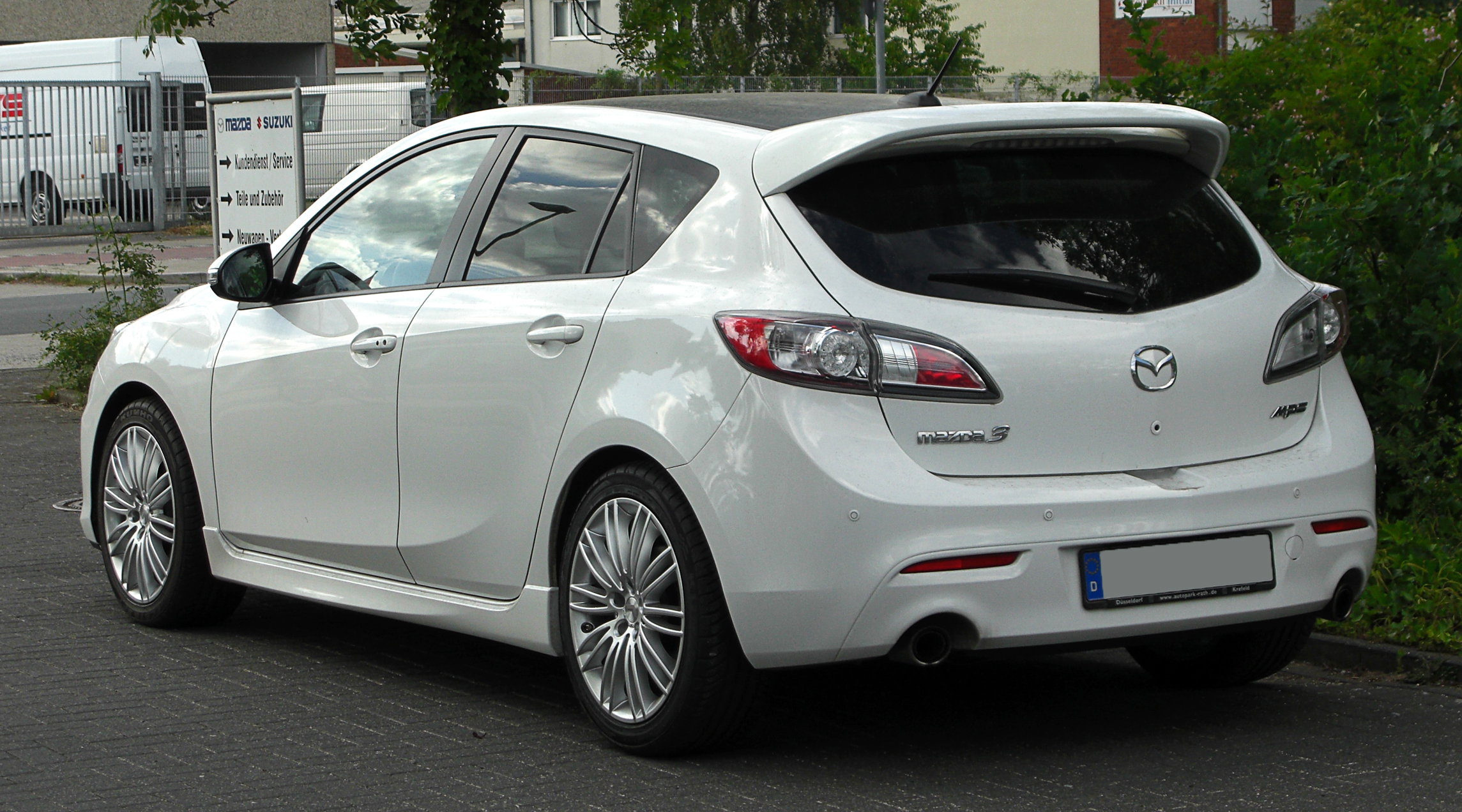
Mazda3 MPS (Germany)

The 2010 Mazdaspeed3 retained the MZR 2.3 DISI Turbo engine. New ECU tweaks provided for a more useful power curve; additionally the gear ratios were revised. The 6-speed manual transmission has a wider 2nd through 5th gear ratio than the previous generation. A torque-sensing conical limited-slip differential (LSD) is standard. The second-generation Mazdaspeed3 comes with larger diameter stabilizers with longer mount spans and wider Dunlop 18-inch tires. Front brakes have large diameter 12.6-inch ventilated discs. A functional hood scoop was added to allow for a denser charge to the top-mounted intercooler while also keeping heat soak to a minimum, a common complaint with the 1st generation Mazdaspeed3. The newer generation MZR engine contained updated pistons with a "dish" around the spark plug area. This was probably to keep the fuel mix concentrated around the spark plug for better combustion. The car weighed more than its predecessor at 3,284 pounds (1,490 kg), but this was offset by the ECU and gear updates. From a standstill a 2010 Mazdaspeed3 can reach 60 mph (97 km/h) in 5.2 seconds, and the 1/4 mile (402 m) in 13.9 seconds at 102 mph (164 km/h). The suspension and steering have been changed to improve performance, most notably with the addition of electric-assisted steering. On the 2013 models, the wheels were powder coated a black hue, and the mirrors and rear valance were black. The U.S. EPA rates the 2013 Mazdaspeed3 at 18 mpg_{‑US} (13 L/100 km; 22 mpg_{‑imp}) City and 25 mpg_{‑US} (9.4 L/100 km; 30 mpg_{‑imp}) Highway on premium gasoline.

The 2013 model year was the final year of production for this generation of Mazdaspeed3 vehicles.

== Awards and recognition ==
The Mazdaspeed3 has received numerous awards since its inception, winning Car and Driver's 10 Best list for 2007, 2008, and 2010; the car was an Automobile Magazine's 2007 All Star as well and has also received several more mentions and awards.
