= Honda Integra (fourth generation) =

Compact sports car

Honda Integra Fourth generation (DC5)
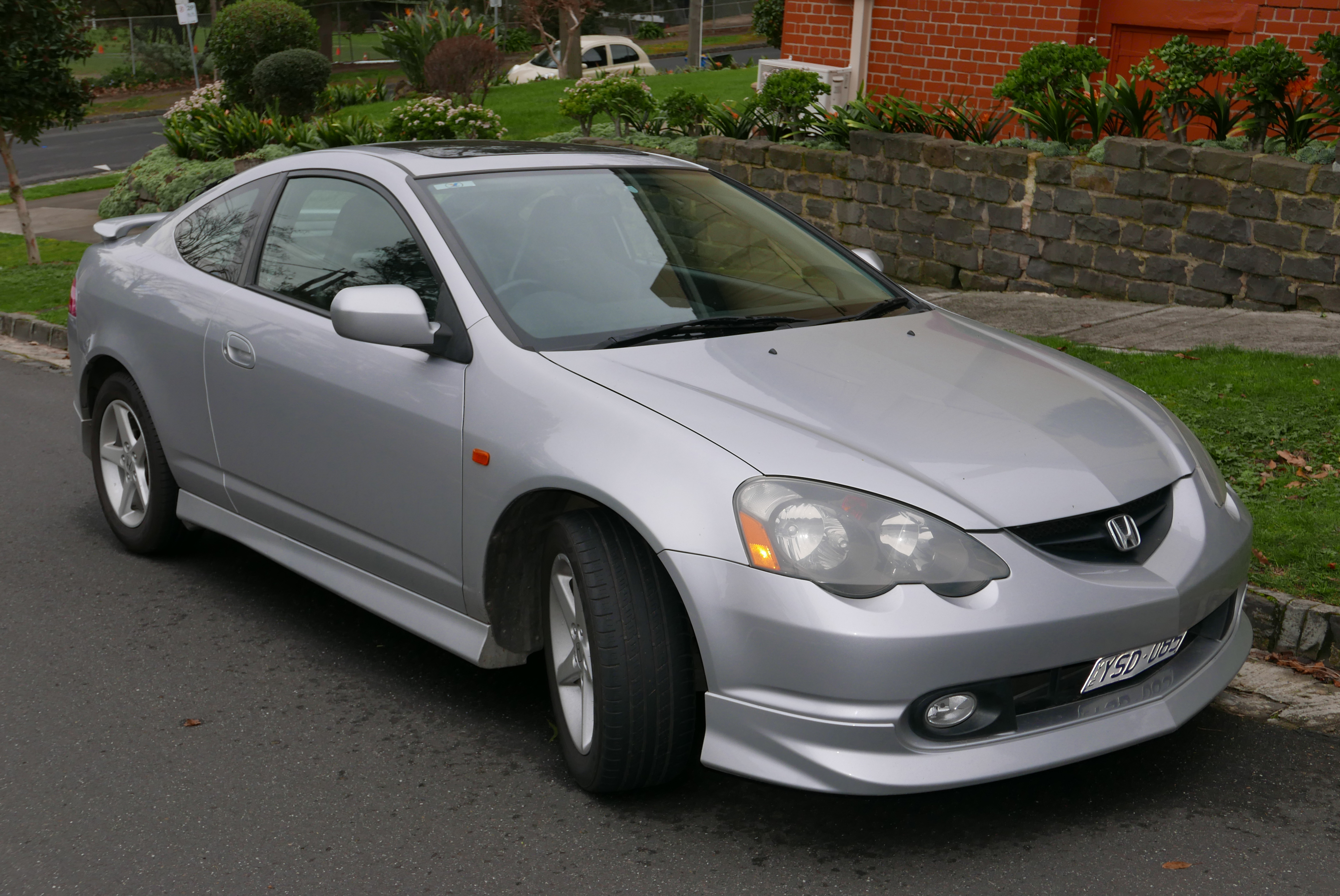
- 2002 Honda Integra (Australia)

Overview
- Manufacturer: Honda
- Model code: DC5
- Also called: Acura RSX (North America)
- Production: July 2001 – August 2006
- Model years: 2002–2006
- Assembly: Japan: Sayama, Saitama (Sayama Plant); Japan: Suzuka, Mie (Suzuka Plant)
- Designer: Hideaki Uchino, Masashi Shimada (2000)

Body and chassis
- Class: Sport compact
- Body style: 3-door liftback coupé
- Layout: Front-engine, front-wheel drive

Powertrain
- Engine: Gasoline: 2.0 L K20A3 I4 (2002–2006 Base); 2.0 L K20A2 I4 (2002–2004 Type R/S); 2.0 L K20Z1 I4 (2005-2006 Type S); 2.0 L K20A I4 (Type R)
- Power output: 160 hp (119 kW; 162 PS) (K20A3); 197–200.5 hp (147–150 kW; 200–203 PS) (K20A2); 206–210 hp (154–157 kW; 209–213 PS) (K20Z1); 220 hp (164 kW; 223 PS) (Type RR)
- Transmission: 5-speed manual; 6-speed manual; 5-speed automatic

Dimensions
- Wheelbase: 2,570 mm (101.2 in)
- Length: 4,385 mm (172.6 in)
- Width: 1,725 mm (67.9 in)
- Height: 1,385–1,400 mm (54.5–55.1 in)
- Curb weight: 1,170–1,230 kg (2,579–2,712 lb)

Chronology
- Predecessor: Honda Integra (third generation)

The fourth-generation Honda Integra (chassis code DC5), is a sport compact car produced from July 2001 until August 2006 by Honda. It was introduced in Japan on 13 April 2001 and in North America on 2 July 2001 as the Acura RSX, the name a part of Acura's naming scheme changing the names of its models from recognizable names like "Integra" or "Legend" to alphabetical designations in order for buyers to build more recognition to the marque, and not the individual cars.

== Chassis and drivetrain ==
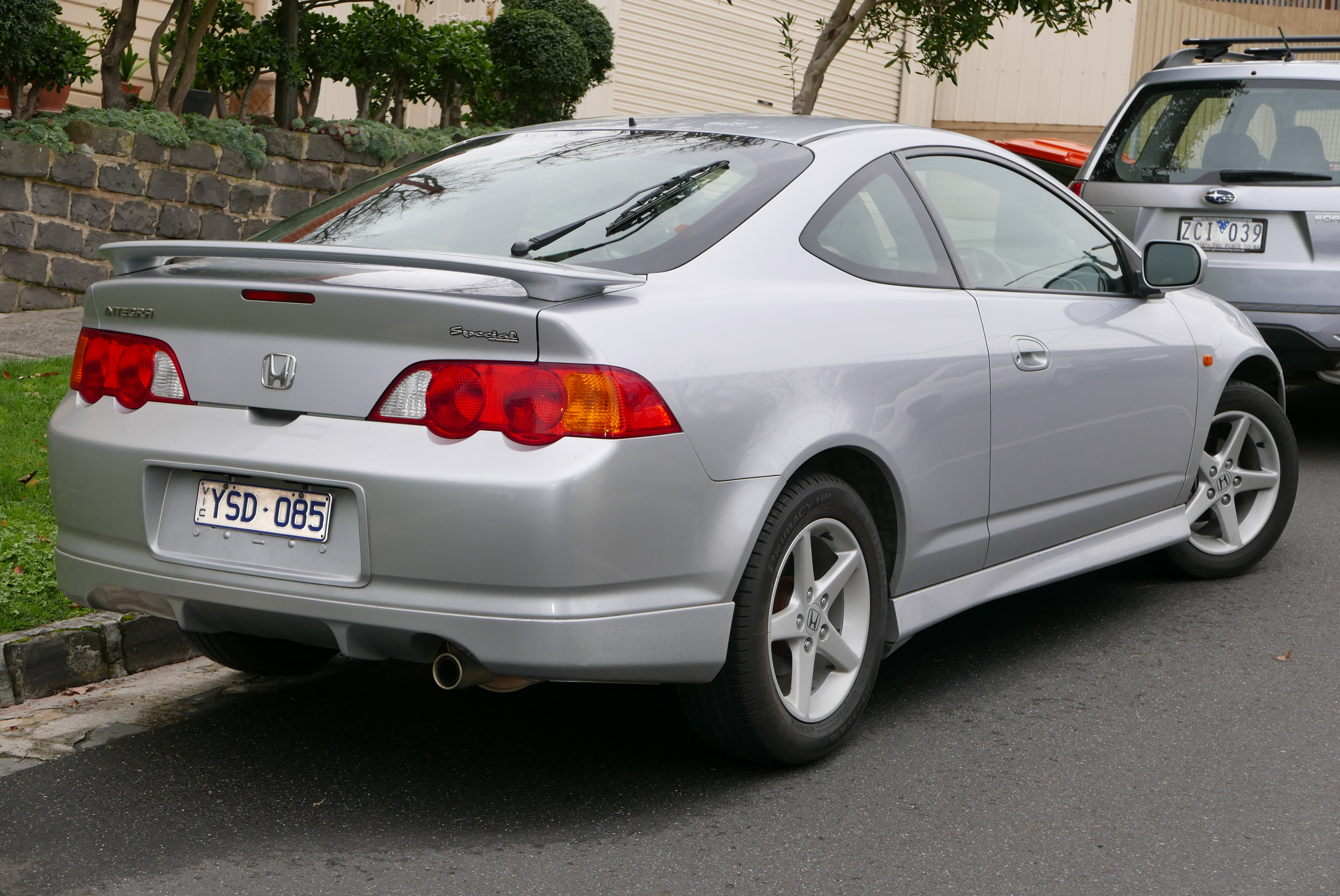
2002 Honda Integra Special Edition

In concordance with the introduction of the Integra's platform mate, the seventh-generation Civic being introduced in 2000, the Integra joined the Civic in abandoning Honda's traditional double wishbone suspension at both ends and adopted MacPherson struts in the front and trailing arm type suspension in the rear along with the new K-series engine supplanting the B-series.

The K-series engine features intelligent VTEC (or i-VTEC), which electronically adjusts valve lift and duration between separate cam profiles, as well as valve timing with the implementation of a continuously variable sprocket, giving the 2.0 L engine a flatter torque curve relative to previous VTEC implementations which only adjusted valve lift and valve duration.

=== Facelift ===
The Integra received a facelift in 2004. The headlight and taillight assemblies lost the "half circle" on the bottom. This made the assemblies flush with the bumpers. The interior received new trim and gauge clusters, an immobilizer and alarm became standard, the body became stiffer, the suspension springs were redesigned, and the car's tendency to bump steer was reduced.

== Markets ==
=== Japan ===
In Japan, the Integra was introduced in two versions, the iS (later renamed Type S in the 2004 refresh) and the Type R.

The iS/Type S (not to be confused with the RSX Type-S), featured the 2.0L DOHC i-VTEC 4-cylinder K20A3 engine with an output of 160 hp (120 kW) and mated to either a 5-speed automatic or a 5-speed manual transmission. The 2001–2003 iS was available with 15-inch steel wheels with covers, or optional 16-inch 5-spoke alloy wheels. The 2004–2006 Type S was equipped with 17-inch 5-spoke alloy wheels shared with the RSX Type-S. The JDM Type R had reduced weight, a 2.0L DOHC i-VTEC 4-cylinder K20A engine that output 217 hp (164 kw) (Japan-only; Oceania models use an engine similar to the RSX Type-S), 6-speed close-ratio manual transmission, as well as a helical limited-slip differential (LSD), stiffer springs and shocks, high intensity discharge (HID) bulbs paired with specially designed reflector headlights (different from all other RSX models), aluminum pedal set, 4-piston front Brembo brake calipers, 17-inch 5 double-spoke wheels on Bridgestone Potenza tires, Recaro faux suede seats/matching interior, leather-wrapped MOMO steering wheel, body trim, front strut bar, and more. The Type R lacked many of the luxury features (like vanity mirrors or side airbags) found in the Type S, true to its racing heritage. The C package on the Type R added various accessories, such as a rear wiper, remote control, and folding mirrors. The JDM iS had one interior color, Ebony, in its first year. After 2002, Titanium interiors became available for all exterior colors. The Type S had redesigned cloth and leather seats. The Type R had choices of black/blue/red interiors (including color matching Recaro seats), depending on exterior colors. The refreshed Type R had the option of either the high wing, or the trunk lip spoiler. Both the iS and Type S were available with sunroof, and navigation systems. Additional interior and exterior accessories were available from Honda's Modulo line. Modulo accessories offered include interior trim (shift knobs, decals, etc.), foglights, aero kits (front/side/rear bumper enhancements), wing spoilers, alloy wheels, push button start, upgraded speakers, and navigation.

Japan's vehicle parts road compliance regulations means many tuning parts for the Integra can be purchased from Honda dealerships. For example, M&M Honda, a Honda dealer, manages their own brand of parts. Honda tuner Mugen sells their performance parts via Honda dealers as accessories.

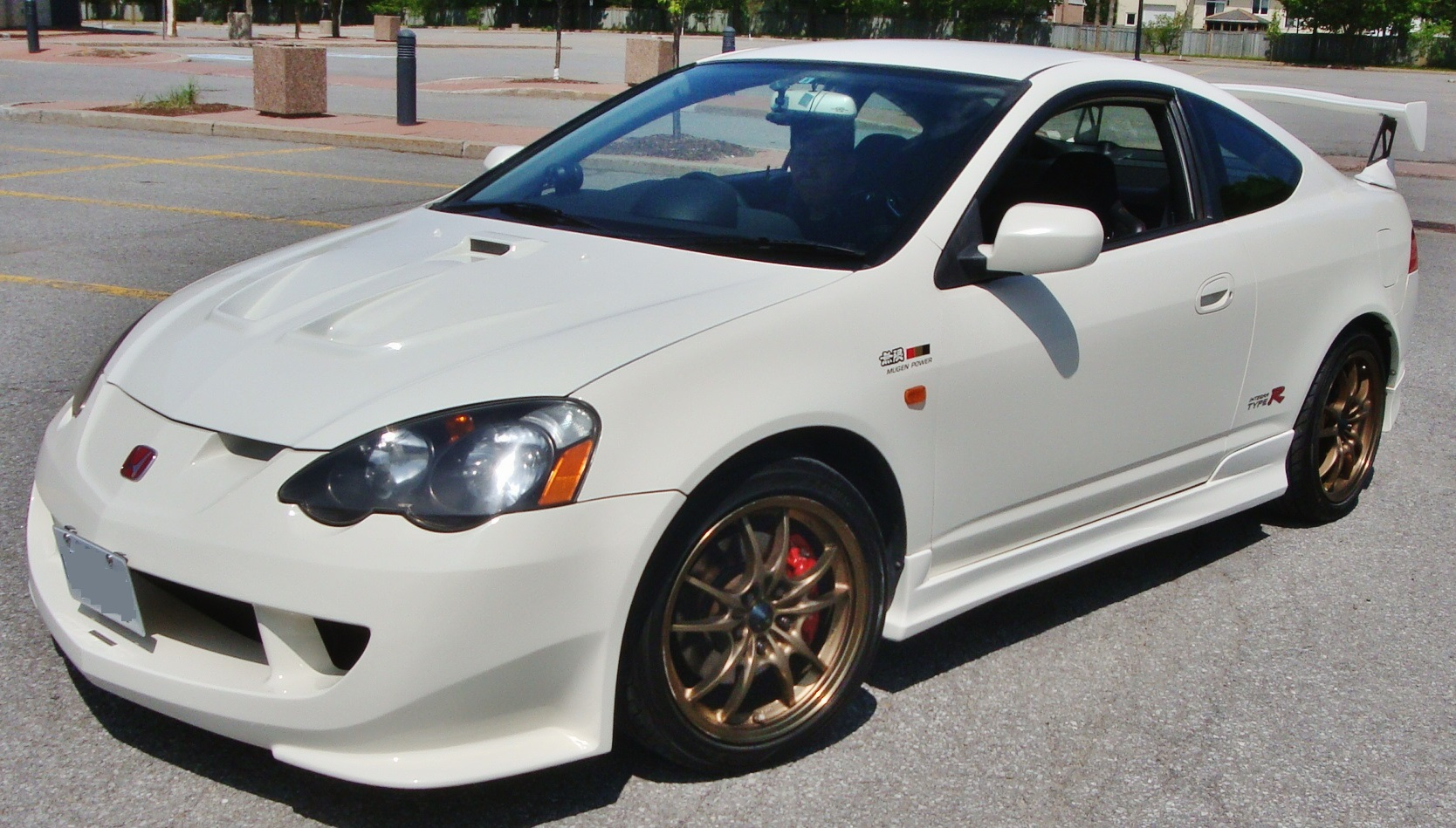
Honda Integra Type R Mugen front

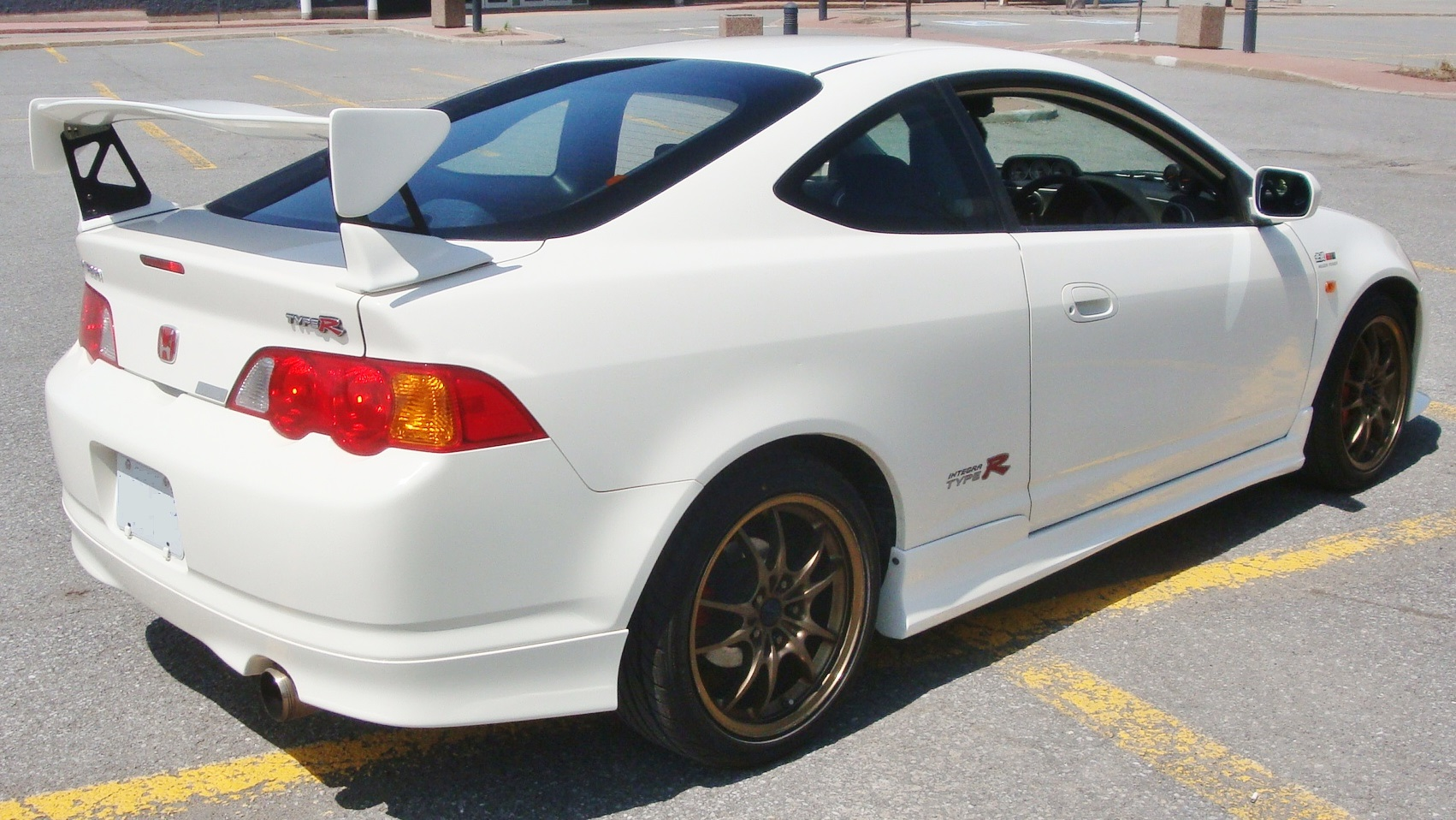
Honda Integra Type R Mugen rear

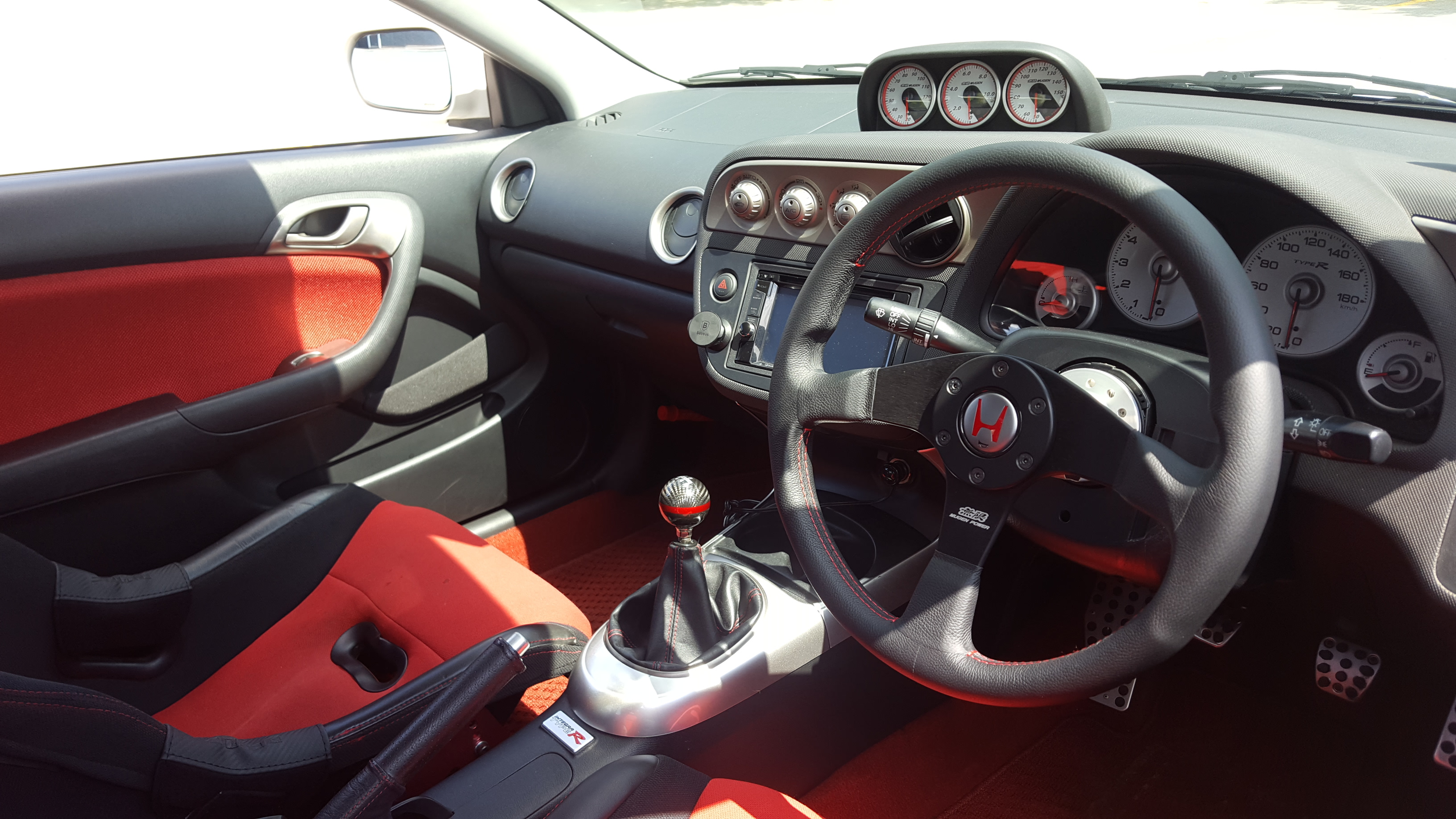
Honda Integra Type R Mugen interior

Exterior Color	Interior Color	iS	Type S
Taffetta White	Ebony/Titanium	X	
Premium White Pearl	Ebony/Titanium		X
Alabaster Silver Metallic	Ebony/Titanium		X
Satin Silver Metallic	Ebony/Titanium	X	
Magnesium Metallic	Ebony/Titanium		X
Desert Silver Metallic	Ebony/Titanium	X	
Jade Green Metallic	Ebony/Titanium		X
Eternal Blue Pearl	Ebony/Titanium	X	
Vivid Blue Pearl	Ebony/Titanium		X
Nighthawk Black Pearl	Ebony/Titanium	X	X
Milano Red	Ebony/Titanium	X	X
Blaze Orange Metallic	Ebony/Titanium		X

Exterior Color	Interior Color	Type R
Championship White	Black	Red
Milano Red	Black	Red
Satin Silver Metallic (2002–04)	Black	Black/Red
Alabaster Silver Metallic (2005–06)	Black	Red
Nighthawk Black Pearl	Black	Black/Red
Arctic Blue Pearl (2002–04)	Black	Black/Blue
Vivid Blue Pearl (2005–06)	Black	Black/Blue

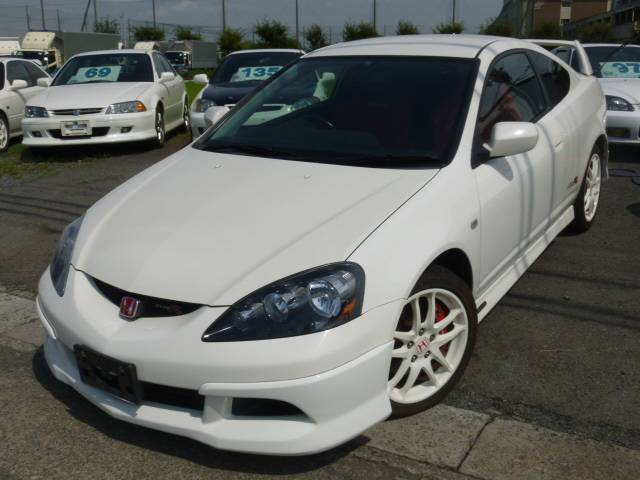
HID head lights/Modulo front kit

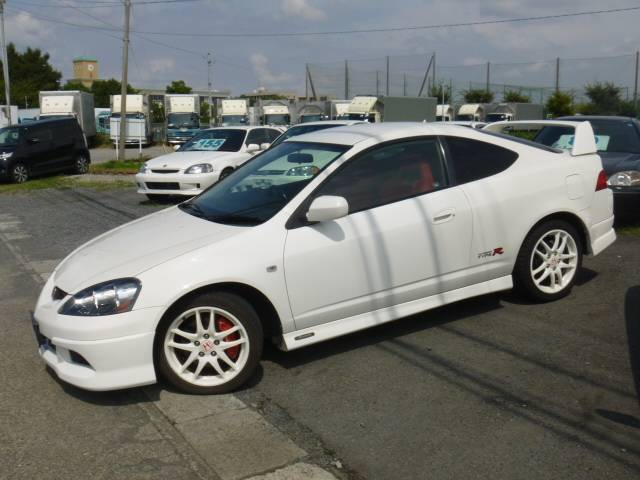
Modulo side skirt

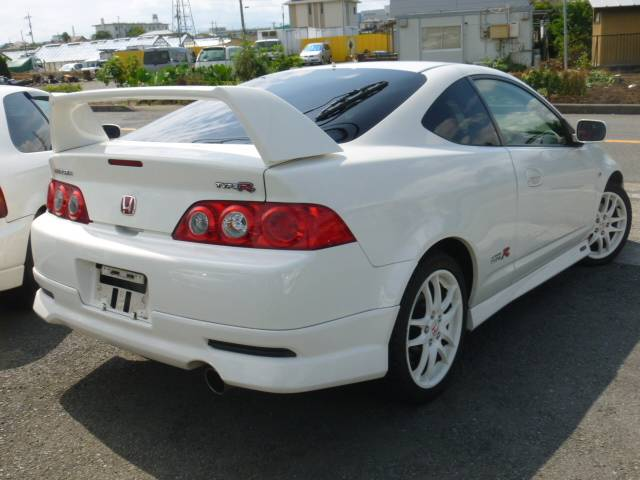
With Modulo rear kit

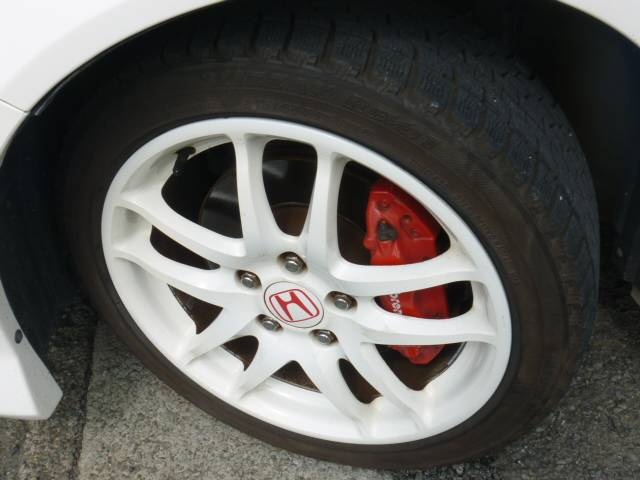
Brembo quad piston calipers, 17x7 5 dual spoke wheels

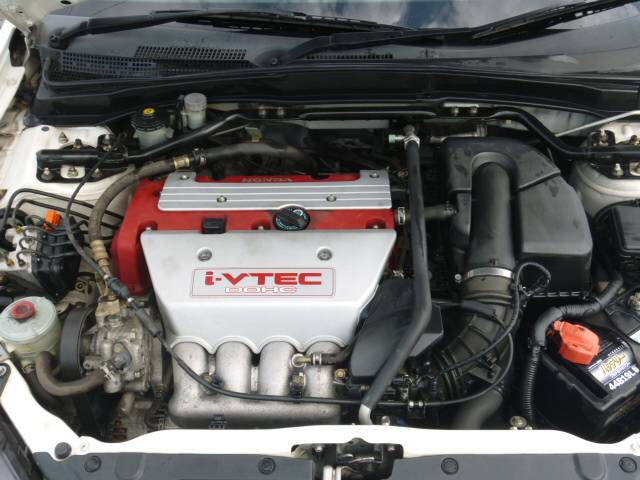
Main engine compartment. K20A engine

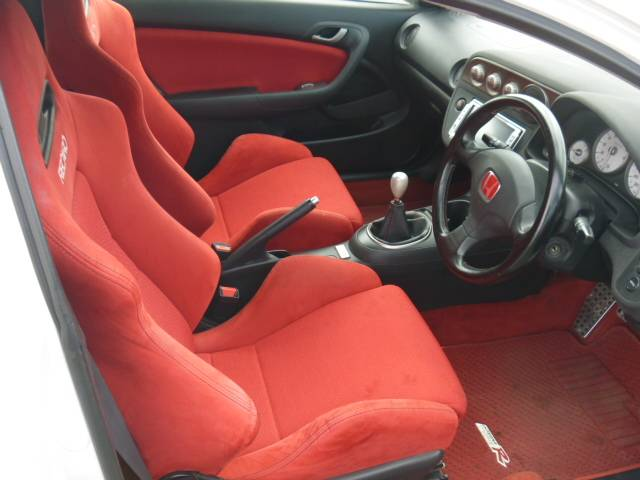
Red Recaro seats

=== Oceania ===
In Australia, the Integra was available in four models: the base model, simply named Integra, Luxury, Type R and Type S. The base Integra was simply the Japanese-market iS, while the Luxury added accessories like leather seats and a sunroof. Australian Type Rs were different from the JDM models, as they were not equipped with all of the features of the latter. They lacked the Brembo braking system, used the 200 hp K20A2 in place of the slightly more powerful K20A, and used regular 16-inch 5-spoke wheels, painted in gun metal or white, instead of the 17-inch, 5 dual-spokes. However, the Australian Type R does retain the JDM model's helical limited-slip differential, full Type R interior (MOMO steering wheel, aluminum pedals and shift knob, Recaro seats and color matched carpets) and aero (wing and front/rear bumper lips). The Type R was dropped in 2004, and replaced by the Type-S, which was mechanically identical to the USDM RSX Type-S (though it did lack cruise control), but badged like the JDM Type-S. With the Integra's refresh in 2004, the base model was dropped. The only trims available in 2006 were the Luxury and Type-S. Black was the only interior color available for the redesign. For facelifted Oceanic models, extra strengthening was given to fit higher safety regulations.

Exterior Color	Integra	Integra Luxury	Type R (02-04)	Type S (05-06)
Championship White	N/A	N/A	Black/Red	N/A
Premium White Pearl	Black	Black	N/A	Black
Milano Red	Black	Black	Black	Black
Satin Silver Metallic	Black	Black	Black	N/A
Nighthawk Black Pearl	Black	Black	Black/Red	Black
Arctic Blue Pearl	N/A	N/A	Black/Blue	N/A
Eternal Blue Pearl	Black	Black	N/A	N/A
Vivid Blue Pearl (2005–06)	N/A	Black	N/A	Black
Magnesium Metallic (2005–06)	N/A	Black	N/A	Black
Blaze Orange Metallic (2005–06)	N/A	Black	N/A	Black

New Zealand only had two models, the VTi and Type R. The VTi came standard with alloy wheels, but was otherwise the same as the JDM iS. The Type R was also replaced by the Type-S like Australia in 2004. NZDM Type R models are the same as AUDM ones, but did not have ABS.

Exterior Color	Integra VTi	Type R (2002–04)	Type S (2005–06)
Championship White	N/A	Black/Red	Black
Premium White Pearl	Black	N/A	N/A
Milano Red	Black	Black	Black
Satin Silver Metallic	Black	Black	N/A
Nighthawk Black Pearl	Black	Black/Red	Black
Arctic Blue Pearl	N/A	Black/Blue	N/A
Eternal Blue Pearl	Black	N/A	N/A
Vivid Blue (05-06)	N/A	N/A	Black
Magnesium (05-06)	N/A	N/A	Black
Blaze Orange (05-06)	Black	N/A	Black
Blade Green (05-06)	Black	N/A	Black

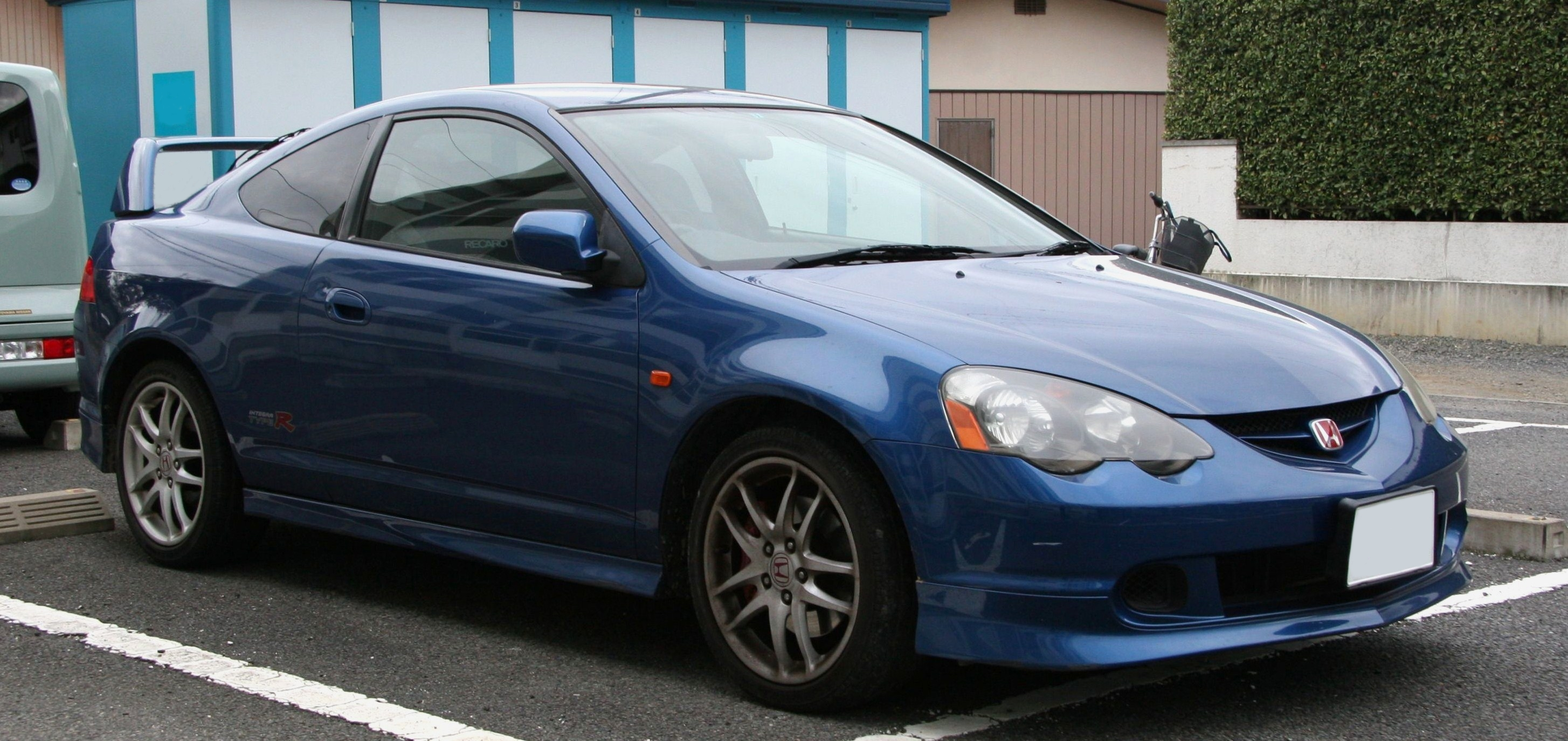
2001–2004 Honda Integra Type R front

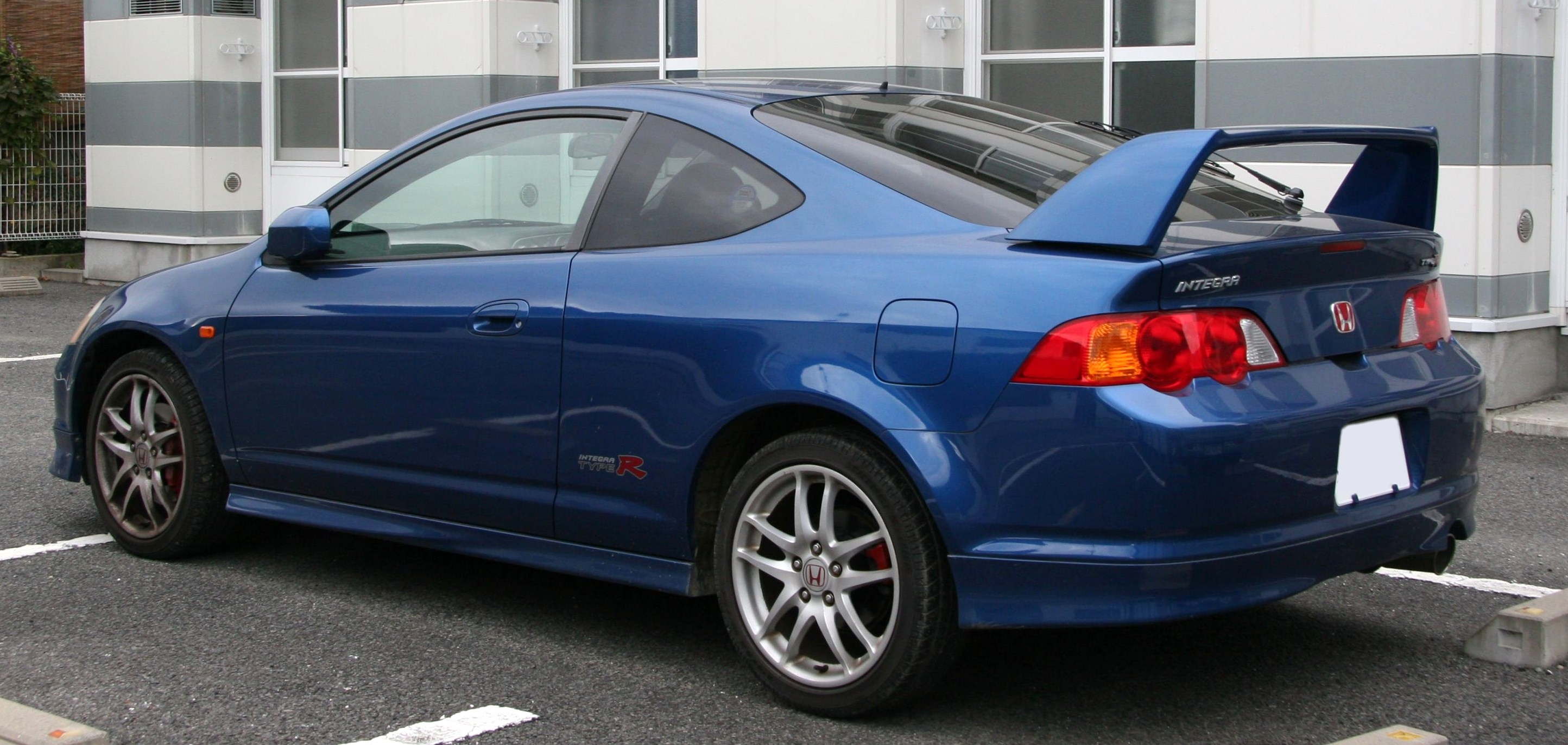
2001–2004 Honda Integra Type R rear

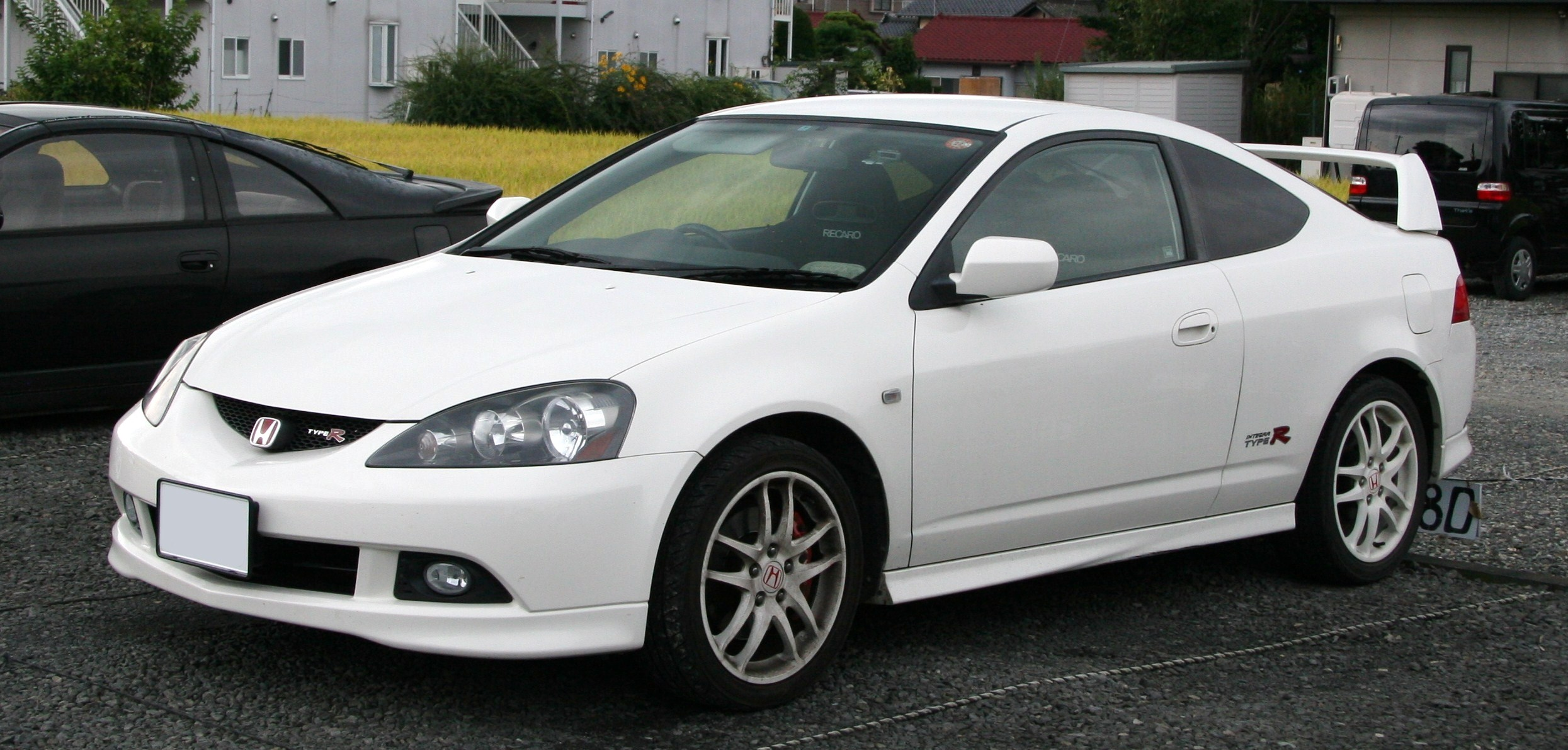
2005–2006 Honda Integra Type R front

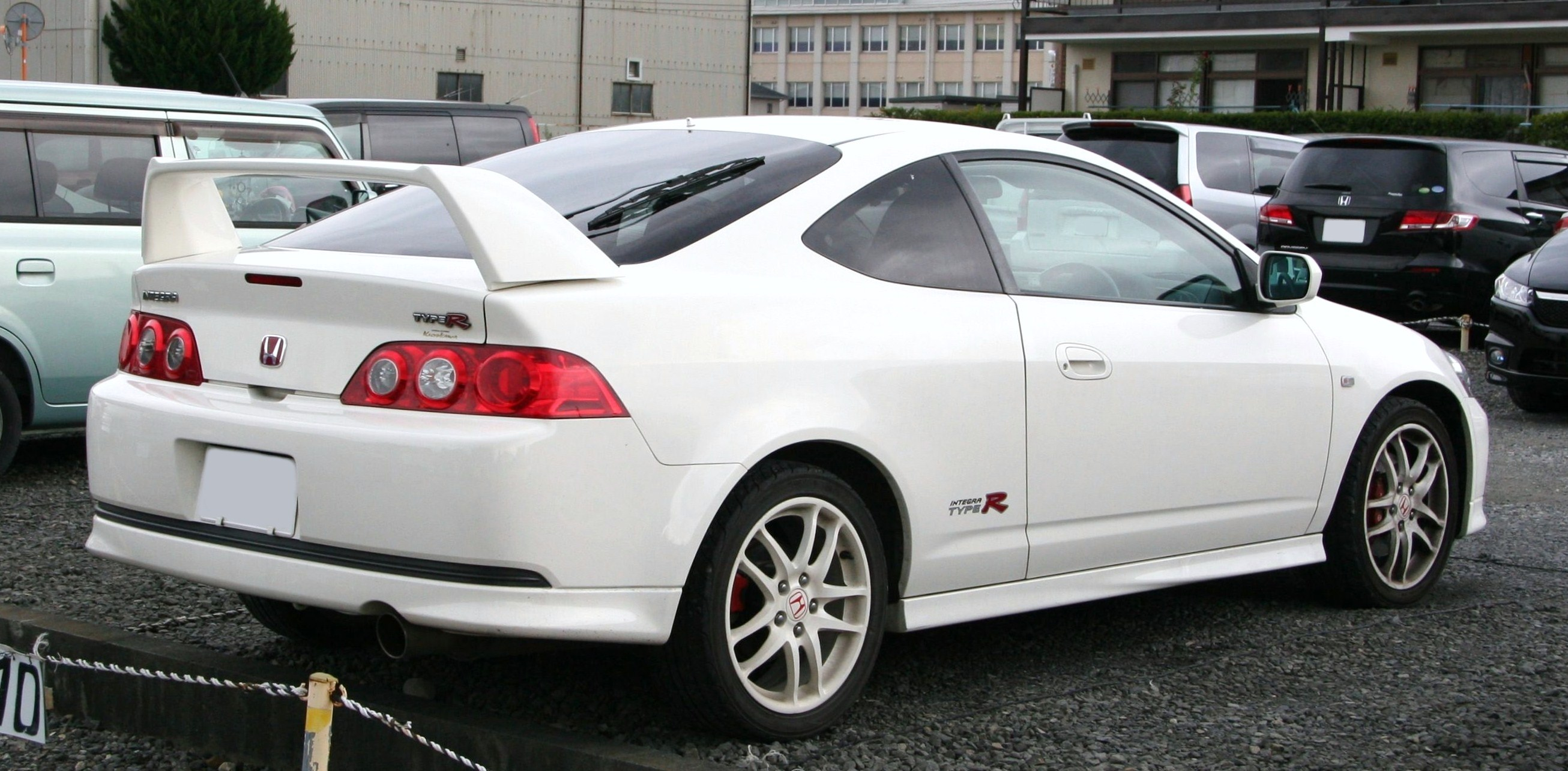
2005–2006 Honda Integra Type R rear

=== United States ===
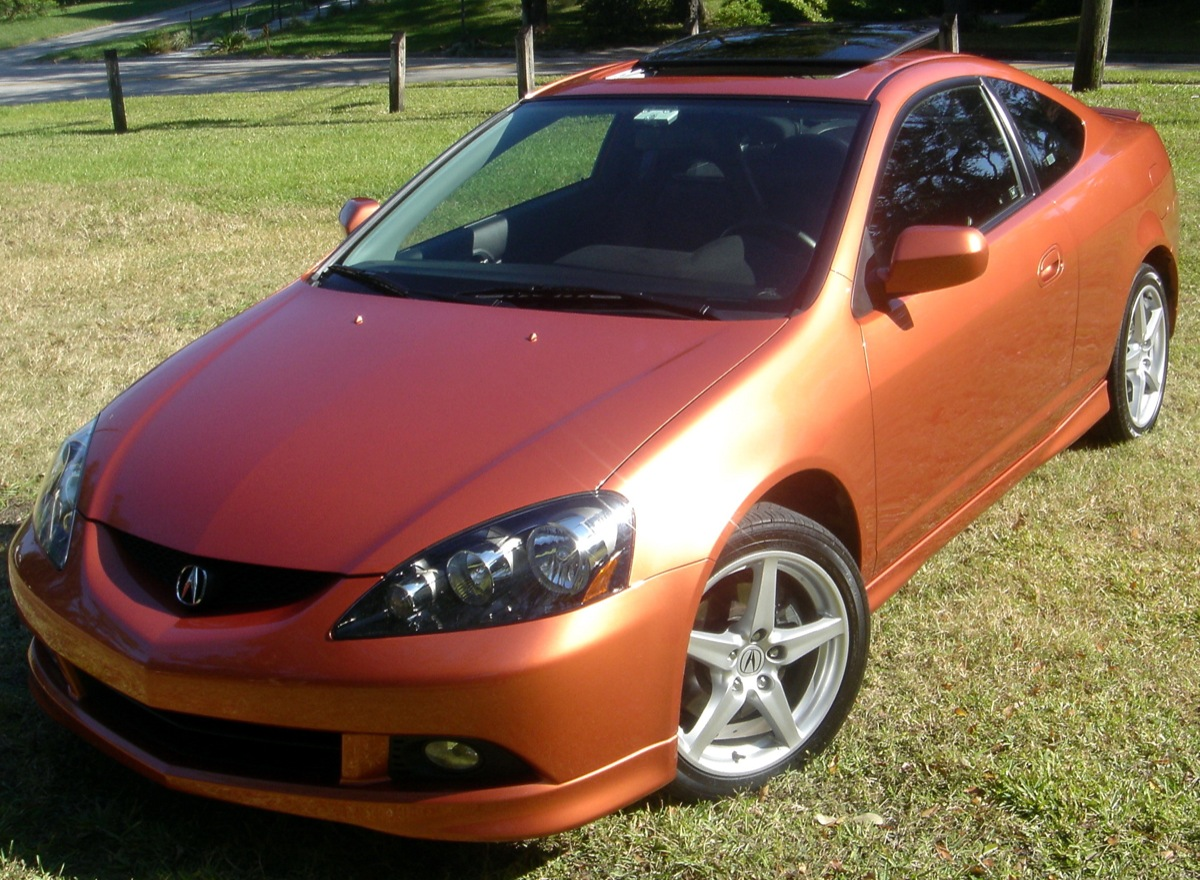
2005–06 Acura RSX Type-S, with A-Spec small trunk lip spoiler

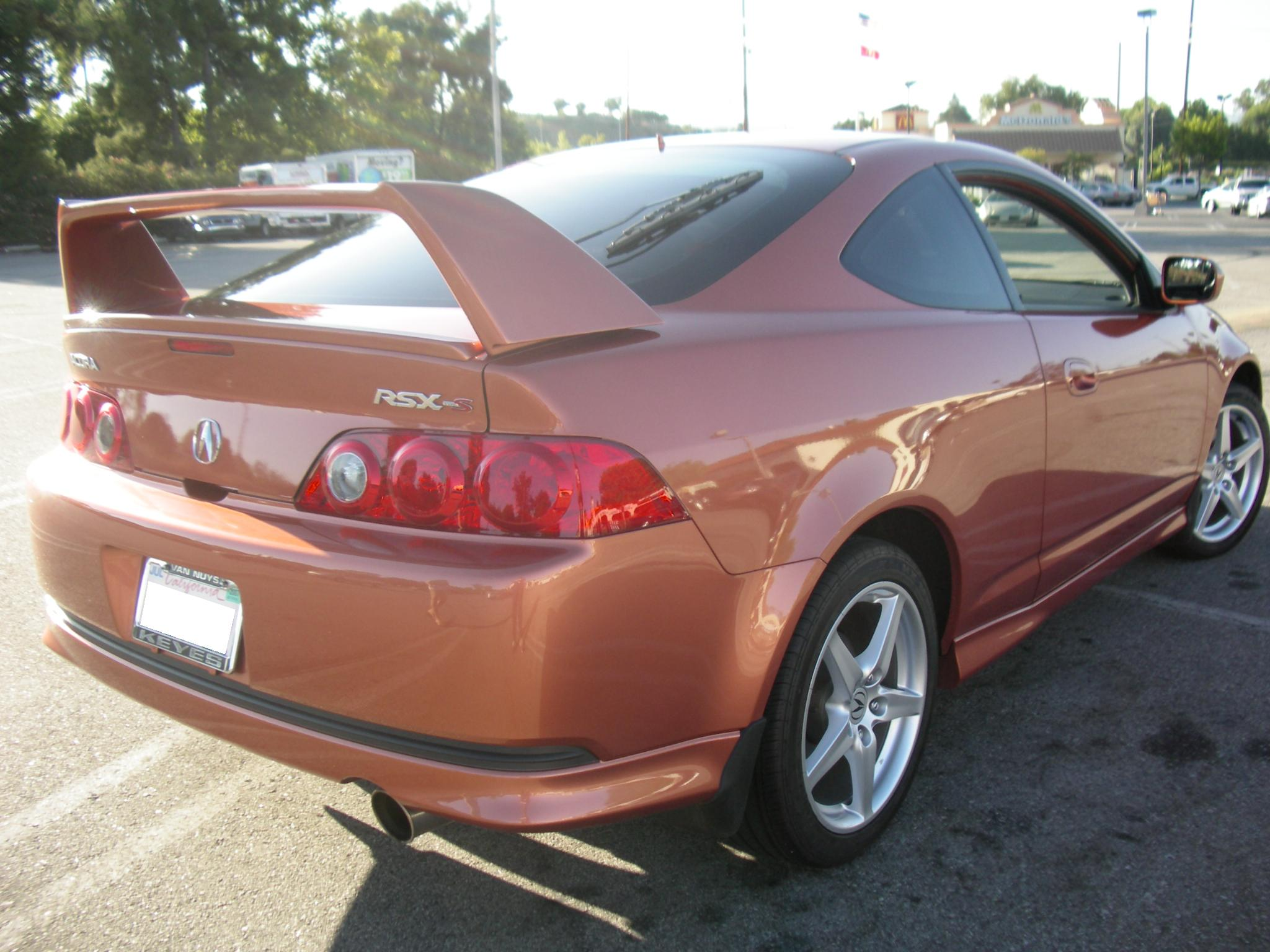
2005–06 Acura RSX Type-S, with A-Spec small trunk lip spoiler and A-Spec/Type R wing.

In the US, the Acura RSX was available in two models: the base model, simply named RSX, and the Type-S. The RSX came standard with features such as cruise control, 4-wheel disc brakes with anti-lock brakes, power windows and a power moonroof. The RSX came with the 160 hp (119 kW) 2.0L DOHC i-VTEC 4-cylinder K20A3 engine throughout the entire production run. (Note: Engine was rated 155 hp (116 kW) after SAE net revision) Sport cloth seats were standard with optional perforated leather interior. Also available were optional 16-inch 7-spoke alloy wheels, which were very similar to those of the USDM DC2 Integra Type R (only 1 inch larger). The base model RSX was available with either a 5-speed manual or a 5-speed automatic transmission with Sequential SportShift and Grade Logic Control.

From 2002-2004, the Type-S was equipped with a 200 hp (149 kW) 2.0L DOHC i-VTEC 4-cylinder K20A2 engine. Beginning in 2005, the engine was replaced with a more powerful 210 hp (157 kW) 2.0L DOHC i-VTEC 4-cylinder K20Z1 engine. (Note: Rated in 2006 as 201 hp (150 kW) due to SAE hp calculation revision.)

The Type-S was only available with a close-ratio 6-speed manual. The Type-S included additional features such as sport seats with perforated leather-trimmed interior, sport-tuned suspension, gunmetal painted wheels, 11.8-inch ventilated front disc brakes, larger sway bars and a Bose 7-speaker sound system (including a subwoofer mounted on the spare tire) with AM/FM tuner, cassette and 6-disc in-dash CD changer.

In 2005, the RSX and RSX Type-S received a styling refresh. On the exterior, the headlights and taillights were updated while the Type-S received an updated rear hatch spoiler. The base model received 12-spoke Enkei alloy wheels, while the Type-S came with 17-inch 5-spoke Enkei/Asahi wheels wrapped in Michelin HX MXM4 215/45/R17 tires. 17-inch Enkei J10s alloy wheels (with Acura specific fitment and center caps) were optional. The Type-S received a higher-output engine which included the camshafts, b-pipe and muffler, 4.77 final drive ratio, crankshaft pulley and the intake snorkel duct from the Japanese Type R.

The "A-Spec Performance Package" was a dealer-installed option for the Type-S. The body kit is essentially a debadged JDM Honda Modulo kit, while the wing is from the Type R. The package included a sport suspension system, under-body spoiler kit, wing spoiler (with stronger hatch shocks to hold additional weight), exterior badging and 5 dual-spoke 17 x 7.5-inch gun metal wheels with Yokohama AVS E100 225/45/R17 tires.

The RSX had numerous exterior color options, but only two interior colors: Black (Ebony) and Beige (Titanium). The exterior color choice would dictate the interior color. Some colors were available in either trim package, while other colors would be available in one trim level but not the other.

In 2002, color options were as follows:

Exterior Color	Interior Color	Base	Type-S
Taffetta White	Titanium	X	
Premium White Pearl	Titanium		X
Satin Silver Metallic	Ebony	X	X
Desert Silver Metallic	Titanium	X	X
Arctic Blue Pearl	Ebony		X
Eternal Blue Pearl	Ebony	X	
Nighthawk Black Pearl	Ebony	X	X
Firepepper Red (2002 only)	Titanium	X	X
Milano Red	Titanium	X	X
Redondo Red Pearl (2003 only)	Titanium	X	X

In 2006, the available color combinations were as follows:

Exterior Color	Interior Color	Base	Type-S
Taffetta White	Titanium	X	
Premium White Pearl	Titanium		X
Alabaster Silver Metallic	Ebony	X	X
Magnesium Metallic	Ebony	X	X
Jade Green Metallic	Titanium	X	X
Vivid Blue Pearl	Ebony	X	X
Nighthawk Black Pearl	Ebony	X	X
Milano Red	Titanium	X	X
Blaze Orange Metallic	Ebony		X

=== Canada ===
Three models were available in Canada: Base, Premium and Type-S. The base model came equipped with a cloth interior, no moonroof, unpainted side skirts and front lip and 15-inch steel wheels with wheel covers, and lacked cruise control and anti-lock brakes. The Premium model added a power moonroof, 16-inch alloy wheels and heated leather seats. The Type-S came equipped with a 200-210 hp (depending on the model year) 2.0L DOHC i-VTEC 4-cylinder engine, larger front brakes, a BOSE sound system with a spare tire-mounted subwoofer, stiffer suspension, an oil cooler and an upper strut tower bar. The A-Spec package was available to the Type-S models. All Canadian cars with leather seats were heated along with side view mirrors.

The refresh in 2005 brought the same updates as USDM cars. The base model now has standard alloy wheels (16-inch, 12-spoke). Sport cloth seats are standard in 2005, optional leather in 2005-2006.

Wheel types varied according to model year. 2002-2004 models had a 15-inch steel wheel with covers (Base), 16-inch 5-spoke alloy wheels in silver (Premium) or gunmetal (Type-S). 2005-2006 had 12-spoke wheels for both Base and Premium. Type-S had the 17-inch 5-spoke alloy wheels. Acura branded Enkei J10s, 16-inch old ITR, and 17-inch 5-dual spoke A-Specs were available as accessory wheels.

The CDM (Canadian Domestic Market) RSX had the same interior as the USDM RSX, however the exterior and interior colours are different. e.g. CDM Taffeta/Premium White Pearl exterior cars came with Ebony black interiors.

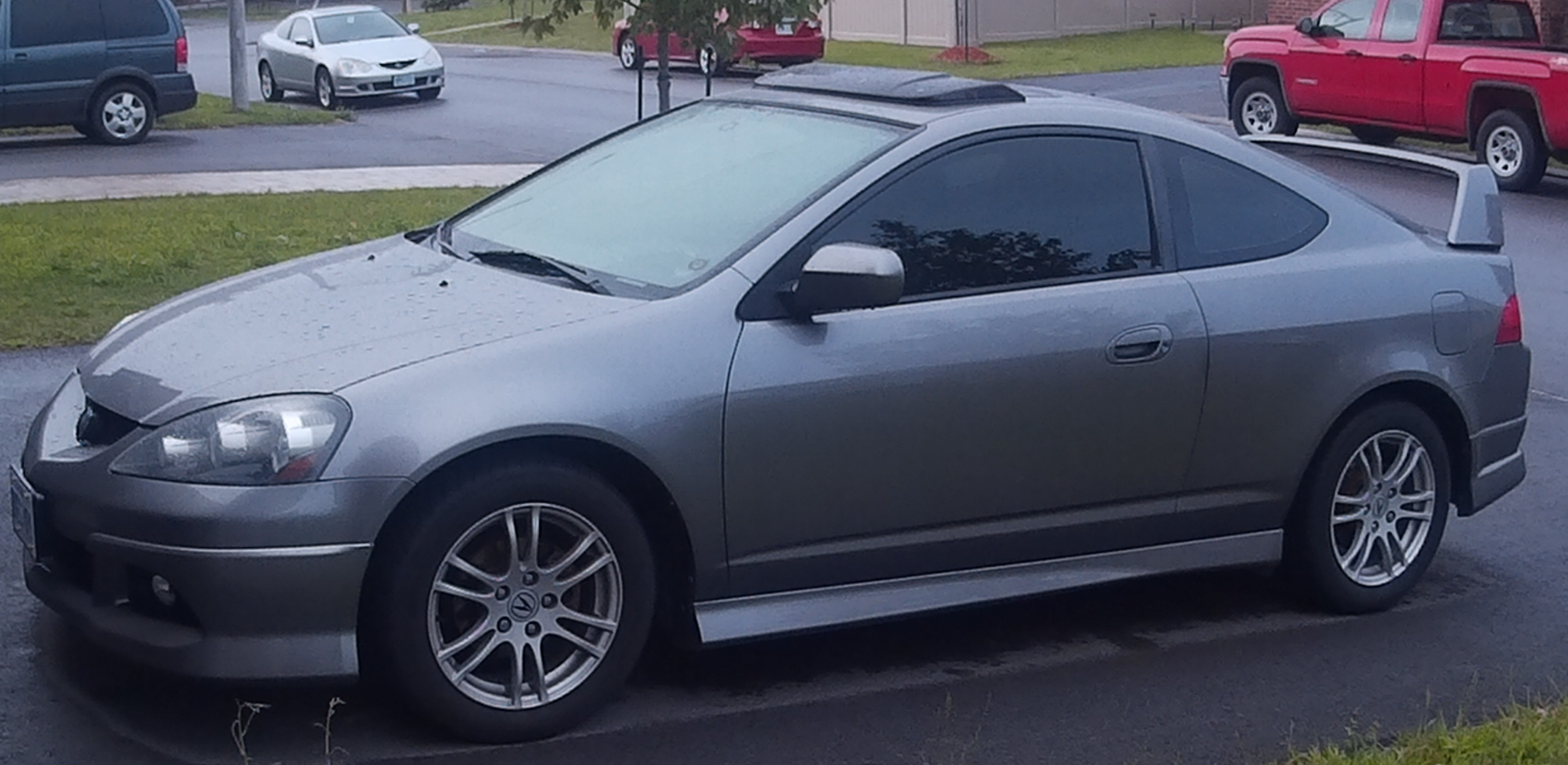
2005 Acura RSX Premium edition, with A-Spec bodykit and A-Spec/Type R wing spoiler.

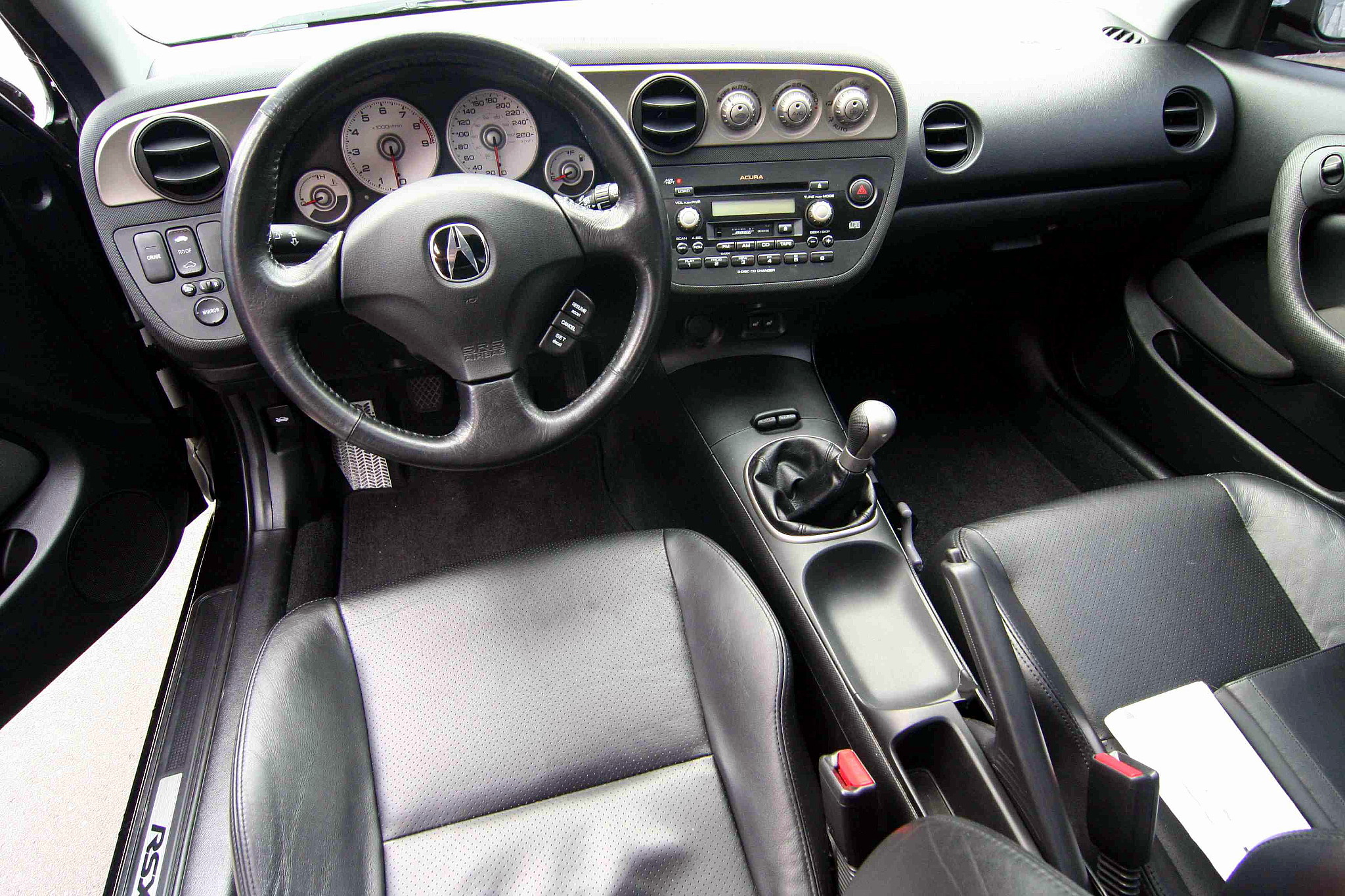
The interior of a Canadian 2004 RSX Type-S

== Safety ==
The RSX came equipped with dual-stage, dual-threshold front airbags, front side airbags with passenger-side OPDS, 3-point seat belts with load limiters and pretensions for front passengers, 4-wheel anti-lock brakes and side-impact door and floor beams.

The National Highway Traffic Safety Administration (NHTSA) has determined crash test ratings of the RSX.

NHTSA scores
Acura RSX (2002–2006)
Frontal Driver:	5/5 stars
Frontal Passenger:	5/5 stars
Side Driver:	4/5 stars
Rollover:	4/5 stars

== Performance ==
- 0-60 mph (97 km/h): 6.3 seconds (2002–04 Type-S)
- 0-60 mph: 6.2 seconds (2005–06 Type-S)
- Top speed : (drag limited) 145 mph (233 km/h)
- Standing 1/4-mile: 15.8 seconds (2002–06 Base)
- Standing 1/4-mile: 15.1 seconds (2002–04 Type-S)
- Standing 1/4-mile: 14.6 seconds (2005–06 Type-S) at 95 mph
- 70 mph-0 mph braking distance : 181 ft (55 m)
- 300 ft (91 m) skidpad : 0.86 g
- EPA fuel economy: 24 mpg_{‑US} (9.8 L/100 km; 29 mpg_{‑imp}) city/31 mpg_{‑US} (7.6 L/100 km; 37 mpg_{‑imp}) highway

== Awards ==
The RSX was named in Car and Driver's 10 Best List in 2002 and 2003.

== Racing ==
Acura won the Manufacturers' Championship of the SCCA World Challenge Touring Car class in 2006, running both RSXs and TSXs. RSX drivers finished in 5th and 9th in the Drivers' Championship. Kensai Racing used RSXs and TSXs in the KONI Challenge Series. Badged as a Honda, the DC5 won the British Touring Car Championship with Matt Neal in 2005 and 2006, for Team Dynamics (branded as Team Halfords after the title sponsor). When competing, a K24 engine swap from an Acura TSX or installing a supercharger/turbocharger is done by many.

== Sales ==
Calendar year	US
2001	16,401
2002	30,117
2003	24,292
2004	21,940
2005	20,809
2006	16,996
