= 2013 Australian Manufacturers' Championship =

The 2013 Australian Manufacturers' Championship was an Australian motor racing series for modified production touring cars. It comprised two CAMS sanctioned national championship titles, the Australian Manufacturers’ Championship (for automobile manufacturers) and the Australian Production Car Championship (for drivers). The 2013 Australian Manufacturers' Championship was the 28th manufacturers title to be awarded by CAMS and the 19th to be contested under the Australian Manufacturers' Championship name. The 2013 Australian Production Car Championship was the 20th Australian Production Car Championship. The Manufacturers title was awarded to Mitsubishi and the Australian Production Car Championship to Garry Holt.

Australian Manufacturers Championship Pty Ltd was appointed by CAMS as the Category Manager for the championship.

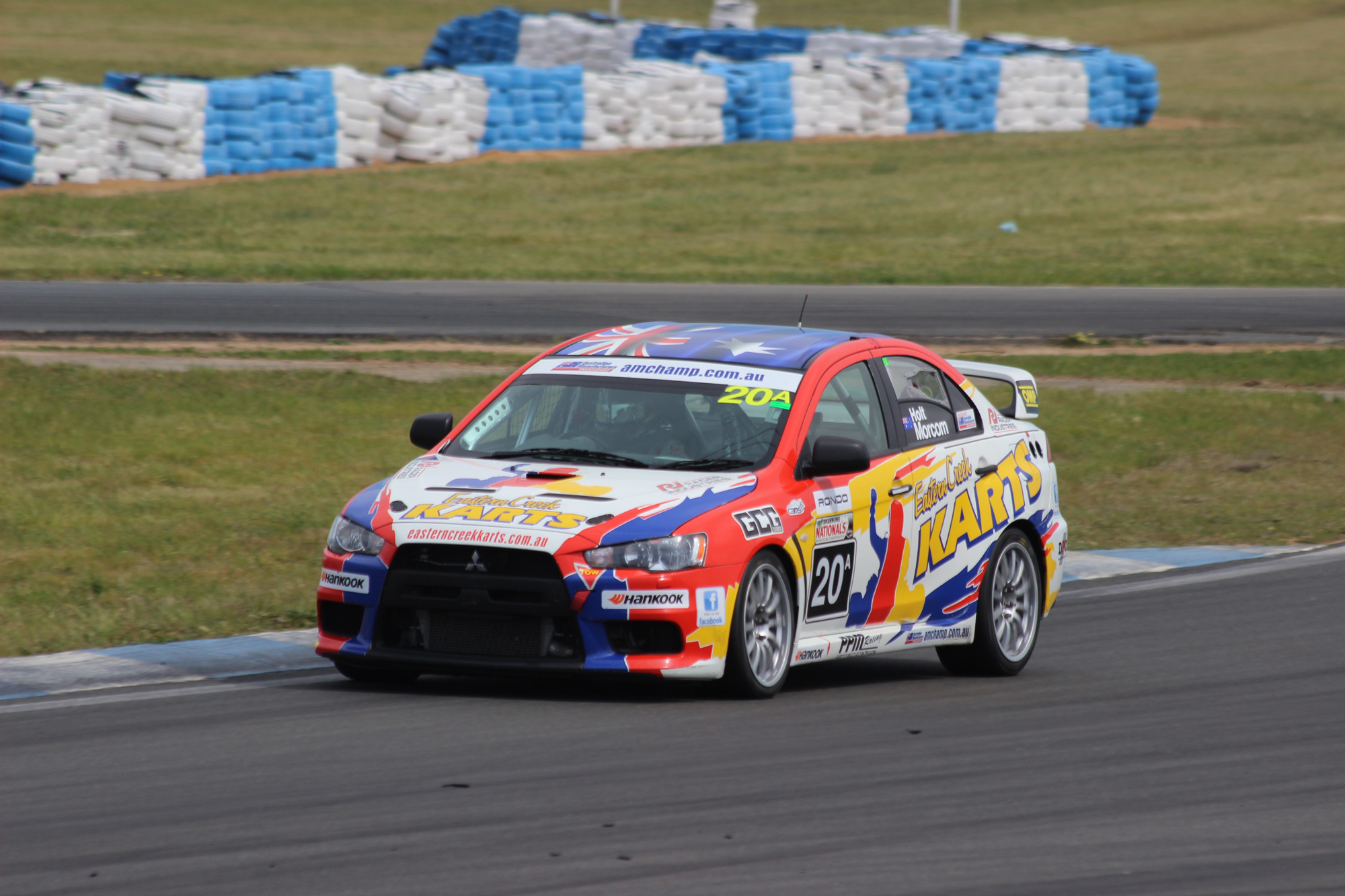
Mitsubishi won the 2013 Australian Manufacturers' Championship

== Class structure ==
Cars competed in the following seven classes:

- Class A : Extreme Performance
- Class B : High Performance
- Class C : Performance Touring
- Class D : Production Touring
- Class E : Compact Touring
- Class F : Hybrid/Alternative Energy
- Class I : Invitational

== Calendar ==
The championship was contested over a five-round series.

Round	Name	Circuit	Date	Format	Winning drivers	Car	Report
1	Great Southern 4 Hour	Phillip Island	24 – 26 May	1 x 4 hours	Bob Pearson; Glenn Seton	Mitsubishi Lancer Evo X	Report
2		Sydney Motorsport Park	12 – 14 July	1 x 3 hours	Garry Holt; Ryan McLeod	Mitsubishi Lancer Evo X	
3		Queensland Raceway	2 – 4 August	2 x 200 km	Garry Holt; Ryan McLeod	Mitsubishi Lancer Evo X	
4		Wakefield Park	18 – 20 October	2 x 200 km	Garry Holt; Nathan Morcom	Mitsubishi Lancer Evo X	
5		Sandown	15 – 17 November	1 x 3 hours	Garry Holt; Nathan Morcom	Mitsubishi Lancer Evo X	

== Points system ==
Each manufacturer scored points towards the Australian Manufacturers' Championship title from the two highest placed automobiles of its make, in any class (excluding Class I). The title was awarded to the manufacturer that scored the highest total number of class points over all rounds of the championship.

- In rounds with one scheduled race, points were awarded to manufacturers on a 120–90–72–60–54–48–42–36–30–24–18–12–6 basis for the first thirteen places in each class with 3 points for other finishers.
- In rounds with two scheduled races, points are awarded to manufacturers on a 60–45–36–30–27–24–21–18–15–12–9–6–3 basis for the first thirteen places in each class in each race with 2 points for other finishers.

Points towards the Australian Production Car Championship outright title were awarded to drivers based on outright finishing positions attained in each race. Points were awarded using the same two scales as used for the Australian Manufacturers' Championship with the addition of two points for the driver setting the fastest qualifying lap in each class at each round.

Points towards the Australian Production Car Championship class titles were awarded to drivers based on class finishing positions attained in each race. Points were awarded using the same two scales as used for the Australian Manufacturers' Championship with the addition of two points for the driver setting the fastest qualifying lap in each class at each round.

== Results ==
=== Australian Manufacturers' Championship ===
		Phi	Syd	Que		Wak		San	Total
Position	Manufacturer			Race 1	Race 2	Race 1	Race 2		
1	Mitsubishi	192	120	105	90	105	96	310	1018
2	Mazda	192	210	105	45	105	96	240	993
3	BMW	210	90	96	186	201	110	-	893
4	Honda	192	210	45	60	60	96	120	783
5	Ford	72	120	81	96	-	-	310	679
6	Toyota	-	72	60	45	45	45	90	357
7	Renault	-	-	-	-	-	60	90	150

=== Australian Production Car Championship ===
==== Outright ====
Position	Driver	No.	Vehicle	Competitor / Team	Points
1	Garry Holt	20	Mitsubishi Lancer Evo X	Eastern Creek Karts	467
2	Michael Benton	11	FPV FG GT	Lovton Coal	252
3	Nathan Morcom	20	Mitsubishi Lancer Evo X	Eastern Creek Karts	240
4	Ryan McLeod	20	Mitsubishi Lancer Evo X	Eastern Creek Karts	227
5	Glenn Seton	33	Mitsubishi Lancer Evo X	Bridgestone Tyres	190
6	Mark Eddy	51; 88	Honda Integra; Renault Megane RS265	Network Clothing / Dentbuster	189
7	Alan Dodd	69	Mazda 6 MPS	West End Mazda	186
8	Francois Jouy	51; 88	Honda Integra; Renault Megane RS265	Network Clothing / Dentbuster	183
9	Geoff Russell	11	FPV FG GT	Lovton Coal	180
10	Beric Lynton	23	BMW 1M	Alphera Financial Services	174
11	Scott Gore	26	BMW 130i	GWS Personnel	171
12	Jake Williams	21	Honda Integra R	Disc Brakes Australia	165
13	Robert Marshall	22	Mitsubishi Lancer Evo X	Melbourne Performance Centre	165
14	Shane Marshall	22	Mitsubishi Lancer Evo X	Melbourne Performance Centre	165
15	Peter O'Donnell	28	BMW 335i	GWS Personnel	162
16	Grant Sherrin	19	BMW 135i	Sherrin Rentals	154
17	Andrew Turpie	86	Toyota 86 GTS	Pedders / Valvoline Racing	151
18	Iain Sherrin	19	BMW 135i	Sherrin Rentals	150
19	Grant Phillips	86	Toyota 86 GTS	Pedders / Valvoline Racing	147
20	Michael Gore	26	BMW 130i	GWS Personnel	141
21	Mark Bell	69	Mazda 6 MPS	West End Mazda	126
22	Bob Pearson	33	Mitsubishi Lancer Evo X	Bridgestone Tyres	120
23	John Bowe	28	BMW 335i	GWS Personnel	116
24	Jake Camilleri	36	Mazda 3 MPS	Grand Prix Mazda	110
25	Sarah Harley	21 & 42	Honda Integra R & Mazda 323 Astina	Disc Brakes Australia	82
26	Luke Searle	3	BMW M135i	Roadchill Express	74
27	John Faulkner	11	FPV FG GT	Lovton Coal	74
28	Scott Nicholas	36	Mazda 3 MPS	Grand Prix Mazda	72
29	Brendan Stone	21	Honda Integra R	Disc Brakes Australia	72
30	Tony Alford	54	BMW 1M	Donut King	63
31	Chris Gough	69	Mazda 6 MPS	West End Mazda	62
32	Tim Leahey	23	BMW 1M	Alphera Financial Services	60
33	George Karadimas	34	Ford FG Falcon XR6 Turbo	AAW Australian Auto Wreckers	54
34	Matthew Lehmann	34	Ford FG Falcon XR6 Turbo	AAW Australian Auto Wreckers	54
35	Gary Mennell	28	BMW 335i	GWS Personnel	48
36	Geoff Rands	21	Honda Integra R	Disc Brakes Australia	48
37	Kevin Herben	42	Mazda 323 Astina	Disc Brakes Australia	47
38	Jeremy Gray	10	FPV FG F6	truckphones.com.au	39
39	Brent Edwards	10	FPV FG F6	truckphones.com.au	39
40	Colin Osborne	31	Mazda 3 MPS	Osborne Motorsport	36
41	Hadrian Morrall	31	Mazda 3 MPS	Osborne Motorsport	36
42	Anthony Kosseris	26	BMW 130i	GWS Personnel	36
43	Terry Conroy	42	Mazda 323 Astina	Disc Brakes Australia	30
44	Michael Gray	21	Honda Integra R	Disc Brakes Australia	24
45	Dylan Thomas	68	Mitsubishi Lancer Evo X	CXC Global	18
46	Ryan Simpson	68	Mitsubishi Lancer Evo X	CXC Global	18
47	Pieter Faulkner	46	HSV VXR	Racer Industries	18
48	Jason Hore	46	HSV VXR	Racer Industries	18
49	Chris Brown	91	Ford BA Falcon XR8	Bell Heavy Haulage	15
50	Greg Jenkings	91	Ford BA Falcon XR8	Bell Heavy Haulage	15
51	Anthony Robson	14	Honda Integra		15
52	Peter Conroy	14	Honda Integra		15
53	Stuart Kostera	68	Mitsubishi Lancer Evo X	CXC Global	2

==== Classes ====
Position	Driver	No.	Vehicle	Competitor / Team	Points
	Class A				
1	Garry Holt	20	Mitsubishi Lancer Evo X	Eastern Creek Karts	467
2	Beric Lynton	23	BMW 1M	Alphera Financial Services	246
3	Nathan Morcom	20	Mitsubishi Lancer Evo X	Eastern Creek Karts	240
4	Ryan McLeod	20	Mitsubishi Lancer Evo X	Eastern Creek Karts	227
5	Glenn Seton	33	Mitsubishi Lancer Evo X	Bridgestone Tyres	214
6	Robert Marshall	22	Mitsubishi Lancer Evo X	Melbourne Performance Centre	171
=	Shane Marshall	22	Mitsubishi Lancer Evo X	Melbourne Performance Centre	171
8	Bob Pearson	33	Mitsubishi Lancer Evo X	Bridgestone Tyres	120
9	Tim Leahey	23	BMW 1M	Alphera Financial Services	90
10	Tony Alford	54	BMW 1M	Donut King	72
=	Dylan Thomas	68	Mitsubishi Lancer Evo X	CXC Global	72
=	Ryan Simpson	68	Mitsubishi Lancer Evo X	CXC Global	72
	Class B				
1	Michael Benton	11	FPV FG GT	Lovton Coal	417
2	Geoff Russell	11	FPV FG GT	Lovton Coal	297
3	Peter O'Donnell	28	BMW 335i	GWS Personnel	297
4	Grant Sherrin	19	BMW 135i	Sherrin Rentals	229
5	Iain Sherrin	19	BMW 135i	Sherrin Rentals	225
6	John Bowe	28	BMW 335i	GWS Personnel	182
7	Luke Searle	3	BMW M135i	Roadchill Express	122
=	John Faulkner	11	FPV FG GT	Lovton Coal	122
9	Gary Mennell	28	BMW 335i	GWS Personnel	117
10	George Karadimas	34	Ford FG Falcon XR6 Turbo	AAW Australian Auto Wreckers	90
=	Matthew Lehmann	34	Ford FG Falcon XR6 Turbo	AAW Australian Auto Wreckers	90
12	Jeremy Gray	10	FPV FG F6	truckphones.com.au	72
=	Brent Edwards	10	FPV FG F6	truckphones.com.au	72
	Class C				
1	Adam Dodd	69	Mazda 6 MPS	West End Mazda	474
2	Scott Gore	26	BMW 130i	GWS Personnel	372
3	Mark Bell	69	Mazda 6 MPS	West End Mazda	354
4	Michael Gore	26	BMW 130i	GWS Personnel	300
5	Jake Camilleri	36	Mazda 3 MPS	Grand Prix Mazda	188
6	Mark Eddy	88	Renault Megane RS265	Network Clothing / Dentbuster	150
=	Francois Jouy	88	Renault Megane RS265	Network Clothing / Dentbuster	150
8	Chris Gough	69	Mazda 6 MPS	West End Mazda	122
9	Scott Nicholas	36	Mazda 3 MPS	Grand Prix Mazda	120
10	Colin Osborne	31	Mazda 3 MPS	Osborne Motorsport	90
=	Hadrian Morrall	31	Mazda 3 MPS	Osborne Motorsport	90
12	Anthony Kosseris	26	BMW 130i	GWS Personnel	72
	Class D				
1	Andrew Turpie	86	Toyota 86 GTS	Pedders / Valvoline Racing	361
2	Jake Williams	21	Honda Integra R	Disc Brakes Australia	360
3	Grant Phillips	86	Toyota 86 GTS	Pedders / Valvoline Racing	327
4	Mark Eddy	51	Honda Integra	Network Clothing / Dentbuster	321
5	Francois Jouy	51	Honda Integra	Network Clothing / Dentbuster	315
6	Brendan Stone	21	Honda Integra R	Disc Brakes Australia	120
=	Geoff Rands	21	Honda Integra R	Disc Brakes Australia	120
8	Sarah Harley	21	Honda Integra R	Disc Brakes Australia	90
=	Michael Gray	21	Honda Integra R	Disc Brakes Australia	90
10	Anthony Robson	14	Honda Integra		36
=	Peter Conroy	14	Honda Integra		36
	Class E				
1	Sarah Harley	42	Mazda 323 Astina	Disc Brakes Australia	244
2	Kevin Herben	42	Mazda 323 Astina	Disc Brakes Australia	242
3	Terry Conroy	42	Mazda 323 Astina	Disc Brakes Australia	120
	Class I				
1	Steve Briffa	8	HSV VE GTS	Briffa Smash Repairs	122
2	Chris Slacksmith	8	HSV VE GTS	Briffa Smash Repairs	120
3	Pieter Faulkner	46	HSV VXR	Racer Industries	60
=	Jason Hore	46	HSV VXR	Racer Industries	60
5	Chris Brown	91	Ford BA Falcon XR8	Bell Heavy Haulage	45
=	Greg Jenkings	91	Ford BA Falcon XR8	Bell Heavy Haulage	45
