= 2013 Great Southern 4 Hour =

Layout of the Phillip Island Grand Prix Circuit

The 2013 Great Southern 4 Hour was an endurance motor race held on 26 May 2013 at the Phillip Island Grand Prix Circuit in Victoria, Australia. It was Round 1 of the 2013 Australian Manufacturers' Championship and as such it was open to "modified production touring cars" complying with the technical regulations for that championship. The race was won by Bob Pearson and Glenn Seton, driving a Mitsubishi Lancer Evo 10.

== Class structure ==
As the race was a round of the 2013 Australian Manufacturers' Championship, the following class structure applied.

- Class A – Extreme Performance
- Class B – High Performance
- Class C – Performance Touring
- Class D – Production Touring
- Class E – Compact Touring
- Class F – Hybrid / Alternative Energy
- Class I – Invitational

There were no starters in Classes E, F or I.

== Results ==
Pos.	Drivers	No.	Vehicle	Competitor/Team	Class	Laps
1	Bob Pearson; Glenn Seton	33	Mitsubishi Lancer Evolution X	Bridgestone Tyres	A	119
2	Grant Sherrin; Iain Sherrin	19	BMW 135i	Sherrin Rentals	B	118
3	Jake Camilleri; Scott Nicholas	36	Mazda 3 MPS	Grand Prix Mazda	C	114
4	Beric Lynton; Tim Leahey	23	BMW 1M	Alphera Financial Service	A	114
5	Peter O'Donnell; John Bowe	28	BMW 335i	GWS Personnel	B	113
6	Mark Eddy; Francois Jouy	51	Honda Integra	Network Clothing / Dentbuster	D	112
7	Scott Gore; Michael Gore	26	BMW 130i	GWS Personnel	C	110
8	Michael Benton; Geoff Russell	11	FPV FG GT	Lovton Coal	B	107
9	Mark Bell; Adam Dodd	69	Mazda 6 MPS	West End Mazda / Bell Heavy Haul	C	106
10	Sarah Harley; Michael Gray	21	Honda Integra R	Disc Brakes Australia	D	105
11	Dylan Thomas; Ryan Simpson	68	Mitsubishi Lancer Evolution X	CXC Global	A	103
DNF	Garry Holt; Ryan McLeod	20	Mitsubishi Lancer Evolution X	Eastern Creek Karts	A	87
DNF	Michael Sherrin; David Ayers	72	Mini Cooper S	Sherrin Rentals	I	64
DNF	Grant Phillips; Andrew Turpie	86	Toyota 86 GTS	Pedders / Valvoline Racing	D	56
DNF	Colin Osborne; Hadrian Morrall	13	Mazda 3 MPS	Osborne Motorsport	C	33
DNF	Tony Alford; Peter Leemhuis	54	BMW 1M	Donut King	A	3
DNF	Franck Donniaux; Richard Gartner	97	Renault Clio	Safe T Stop	D	2

Note: Drivers listed in italics in the above table did not drive the car in the actual race.
