= Mazda6 =

Mazda 6
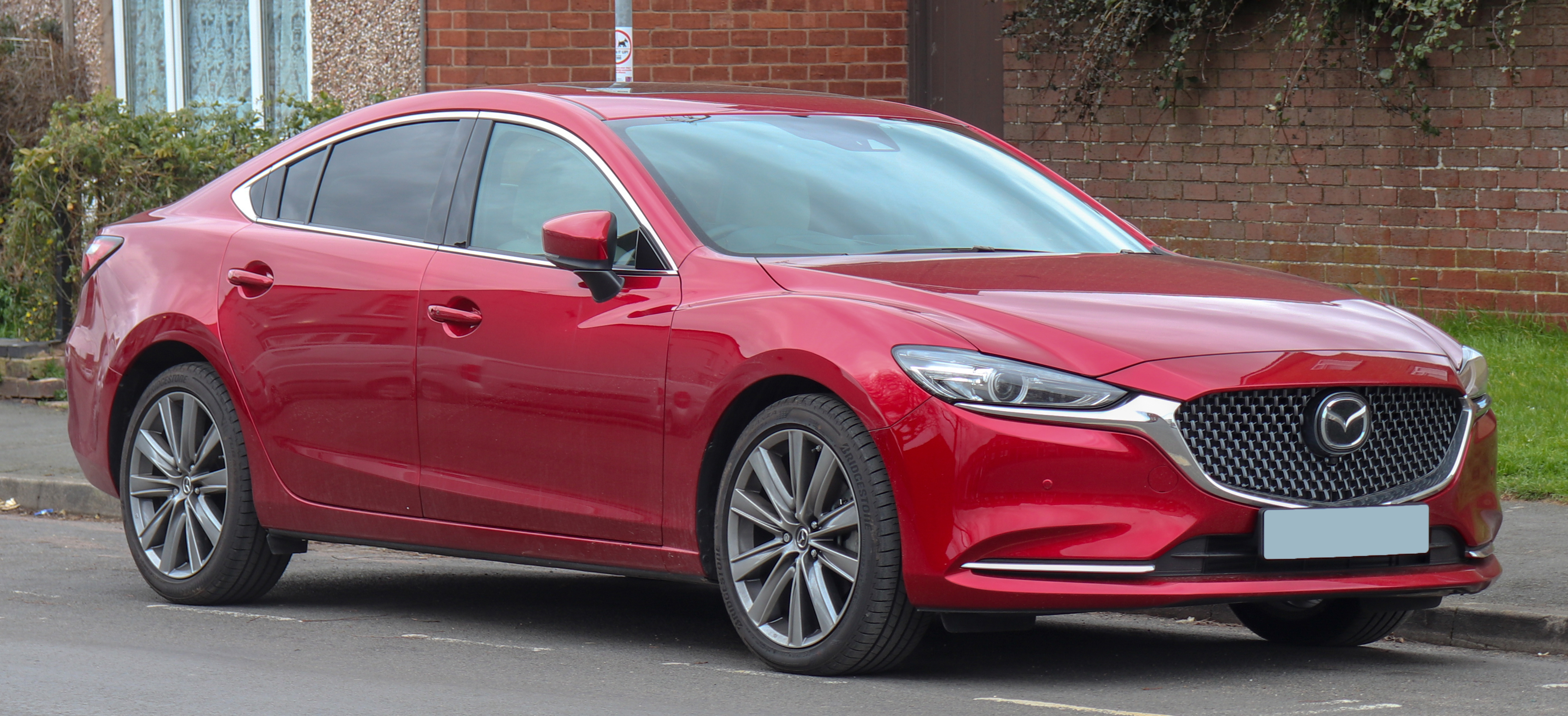

Overview
- Manufacturer: Mazda
- Also called: Mazda Atenza (Japan and China, 2002–2019)
- Production: February 2002 – December 2024

Body and chassis
- Class: Mid-size car (D)
- Layout: Front-engine, front-wheel-drive; Front-engine, all-wheel-drive

Chronology
- Predecessor: Mazda Capella/626; Mazda Xedos 6
- Successor: Mazda EZ-6/6e (China, Europe, Australia)

The Mazda 6 (Japanese: マツダ・シックス, Hepburn: Matsuda Shikkusu) (known as the Mazda Atenza in Japan until 2019, derived from the Italian attenzione) is a mid-size sedan produced by Mazda from 2002 to 2024, replacing the long-produced Capella/626.

The Mazda6 was marketed as the first example of the company's "Stylish, Insightful and Spirited" design philosophy, followed by the Mazda2 in December 2002, the RX-8 in August 2003, the Mazda3 in January 2004, the Mazda5 in the summer of 2005, the MX-5 in October 2005, and the CX-7 in November 2006. The 2003 Mazda6 is essentially the seventh-generation Mazda 626, part of the 'G' model code family.

== First generation (GG1; 2002) ==
First generation
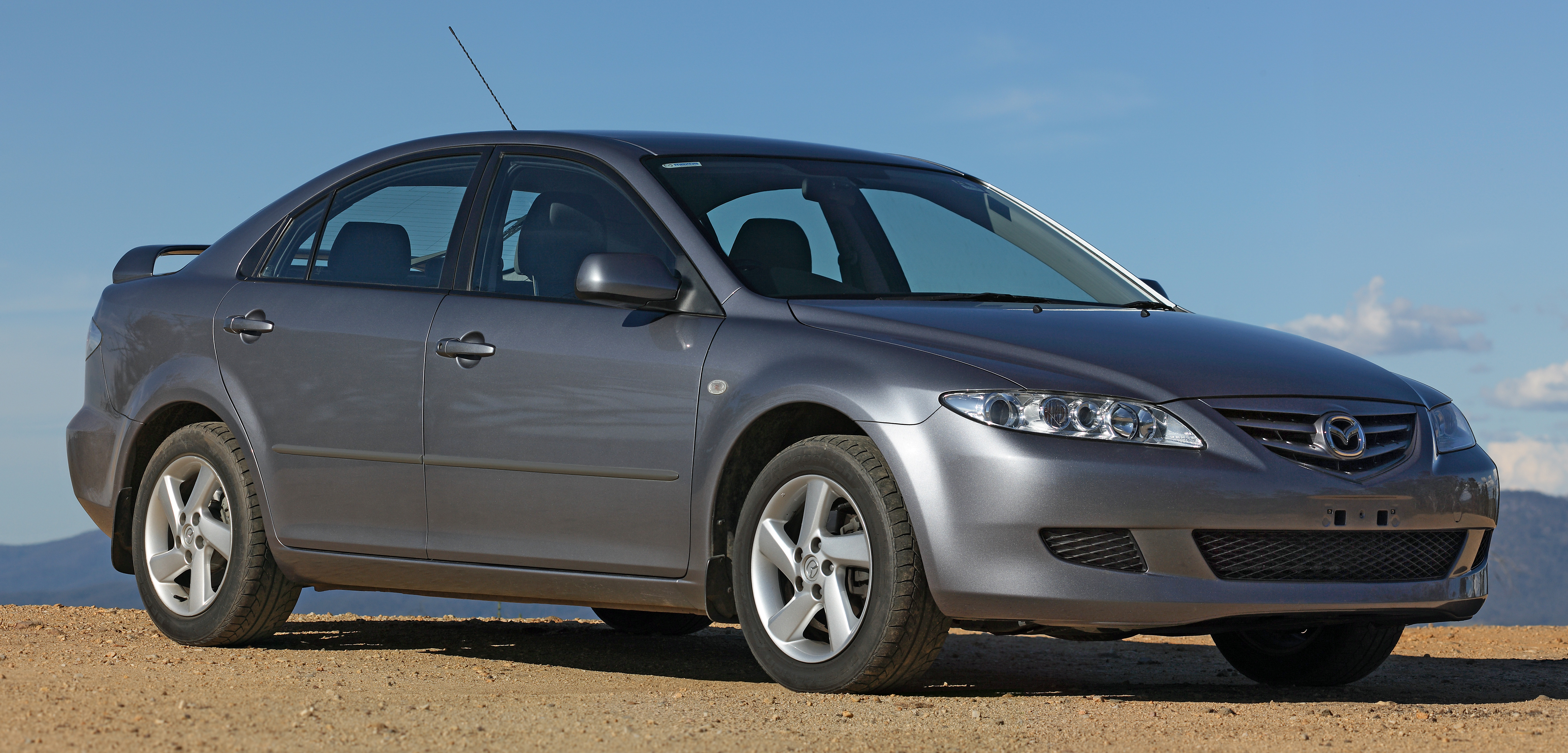
- Pre-facelift

Overview
- Model code: GG1 / GY
- Production: February 2002 – June 2008; 2003–2016 (China)
- Model years: 2003–2008 (US); 2004–2008 (Canada)
- Assembly: China: Changchun (FAW Group); Colombia: Bogotá (Compañía Colombiana Automotriz); Japan: Hofu, Yamaguchi (Hofu Plant No. 2); Russia: Vladivostok (Sollers JSC); United States: Flat Rock, Michigan (Flat Rock Assembly Plant)
- Designer: Kaname Sawai, Koizumi Iwao (1998)

Body and chassis
- Body style: 4-door sedan; 5-door liftback; 5-door wagon
- Related: Ford Fusion; Mazda CX-7; Mazda CX-9; Mercury Milan; Lincoln Zephyr and Lincoln MKZ

Powertrain
- Engine: Gasoline: 1.8 L MZR L8 I4; 2.0 L MZR LF I4; 2.3 L MZR L3 I4; 2.3 L MZR L3-VDT DISI turbo I4 (Mazdaspeed 6); 3.0 L Duratec 30 V6; Diesel: 2.0 L MZR-CD I4
- Transmission: 4-speed 4F27E automatic (I4); 5-speed JF506E automatic (V6); 5-speed FS5A-EL automatic (I4); 5-speed G35M-R manual (I4); 5-speed A65M-R manual (V6); 6-speed A26MX-R manual (Mazdaspeed 6); 6-speed AWTF-80 SC automatic; 6-speed G66M-R manual

Dimensions
- Wheelbase: 105.3 in (2,675 mm)
- Length: Sedan and liftback (International): 4,670–4,690 mm (183.9–184.6 in); Sedan and liftback (North America): 4,745 mm (186.8 in); Wagon (International): 4,700 mm (185.0 in); Wagon (North America): 4,770 mm (187.8 in)
- Width: 1,781 mm (70.1 in)
- Height: Sedan and liftback (International): 1,430–1,435 mm (56.3–56.5 in); Sedan and liftback (North America): 1,440 mm (56.7 in); Wagon (International): 1,480 mm (58.3 in); Wagon (North America): 1,455 mm (57.3 in)

Pre-facelift

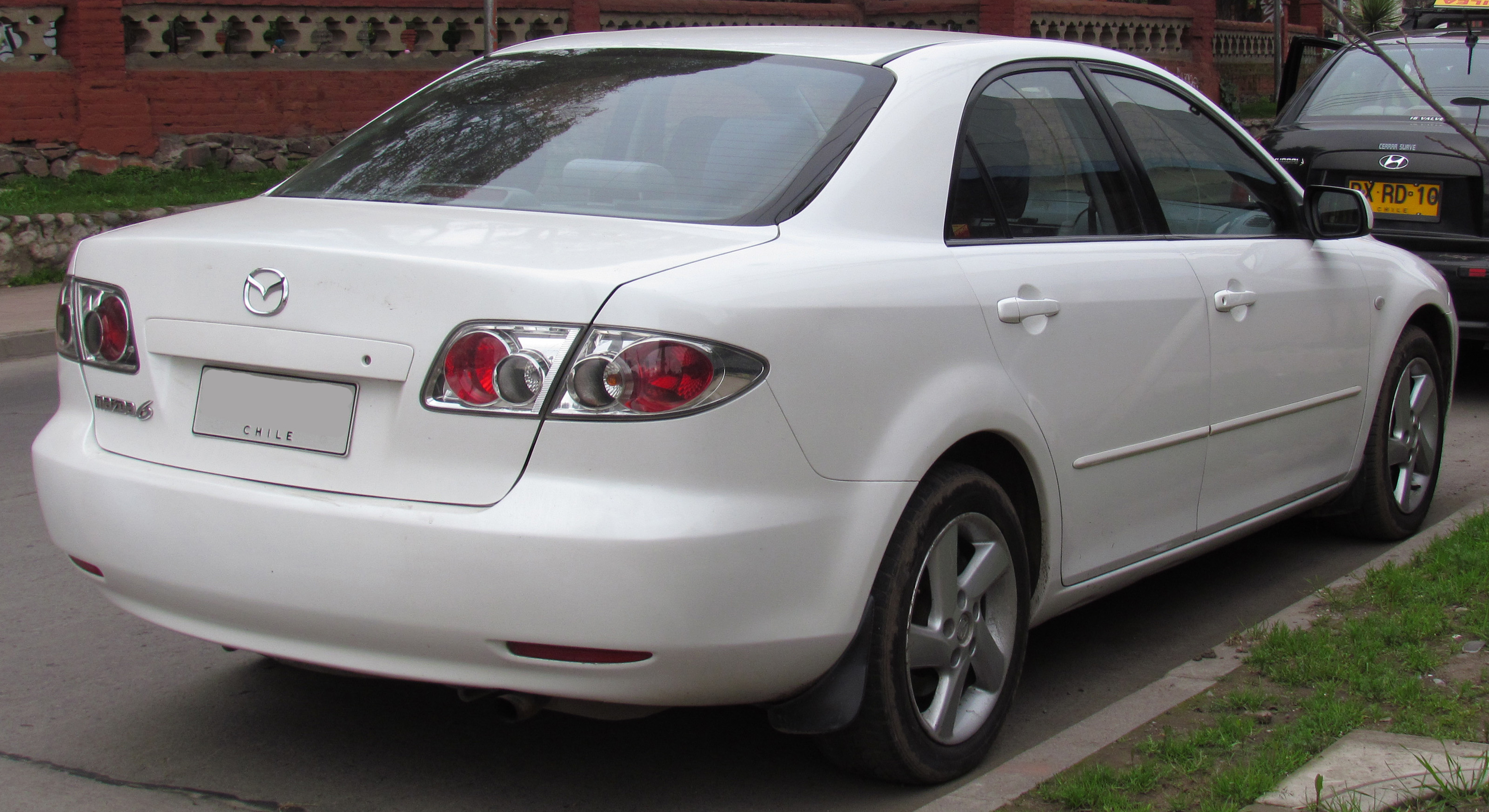
Sedan

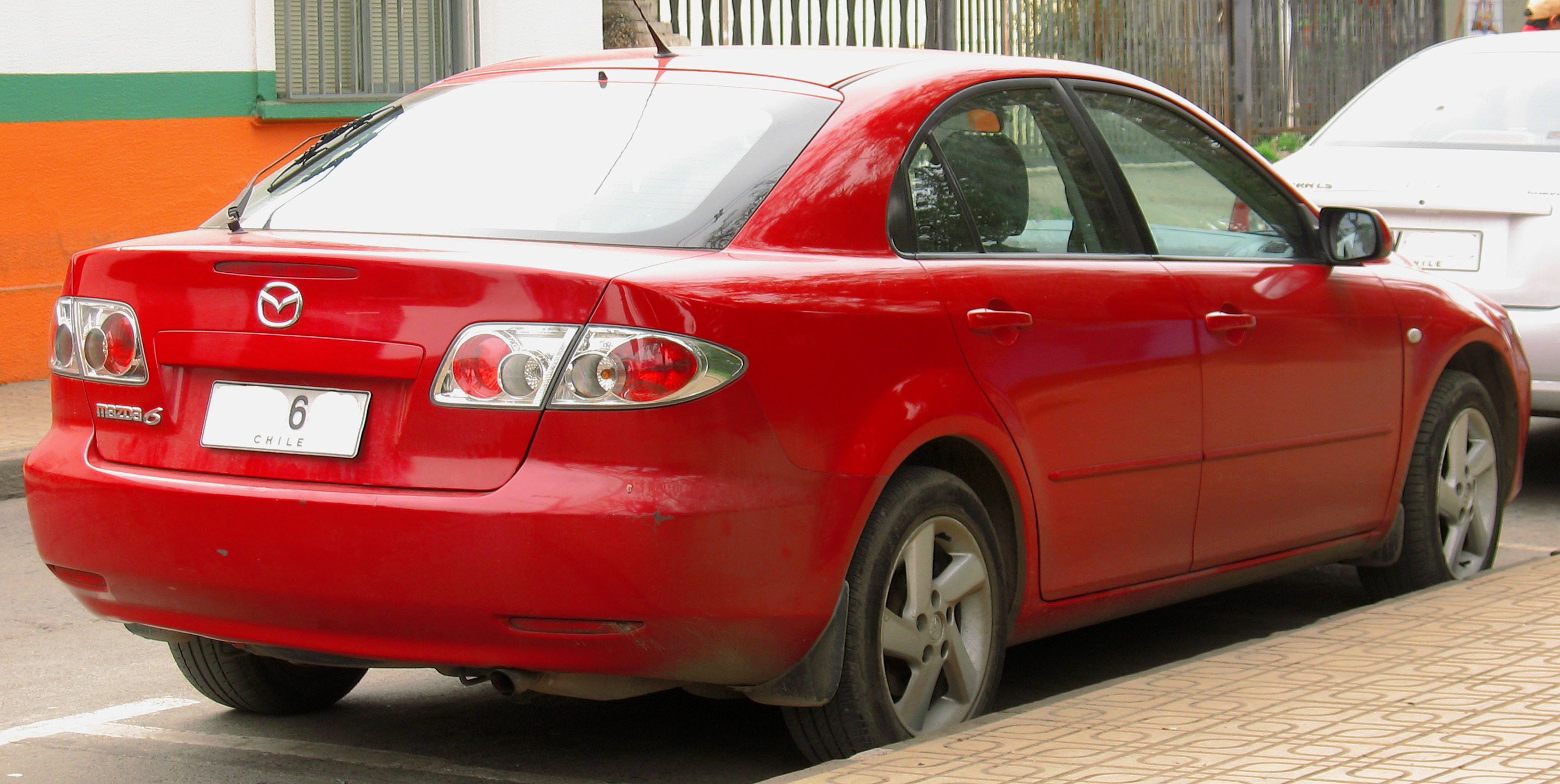
Liftback

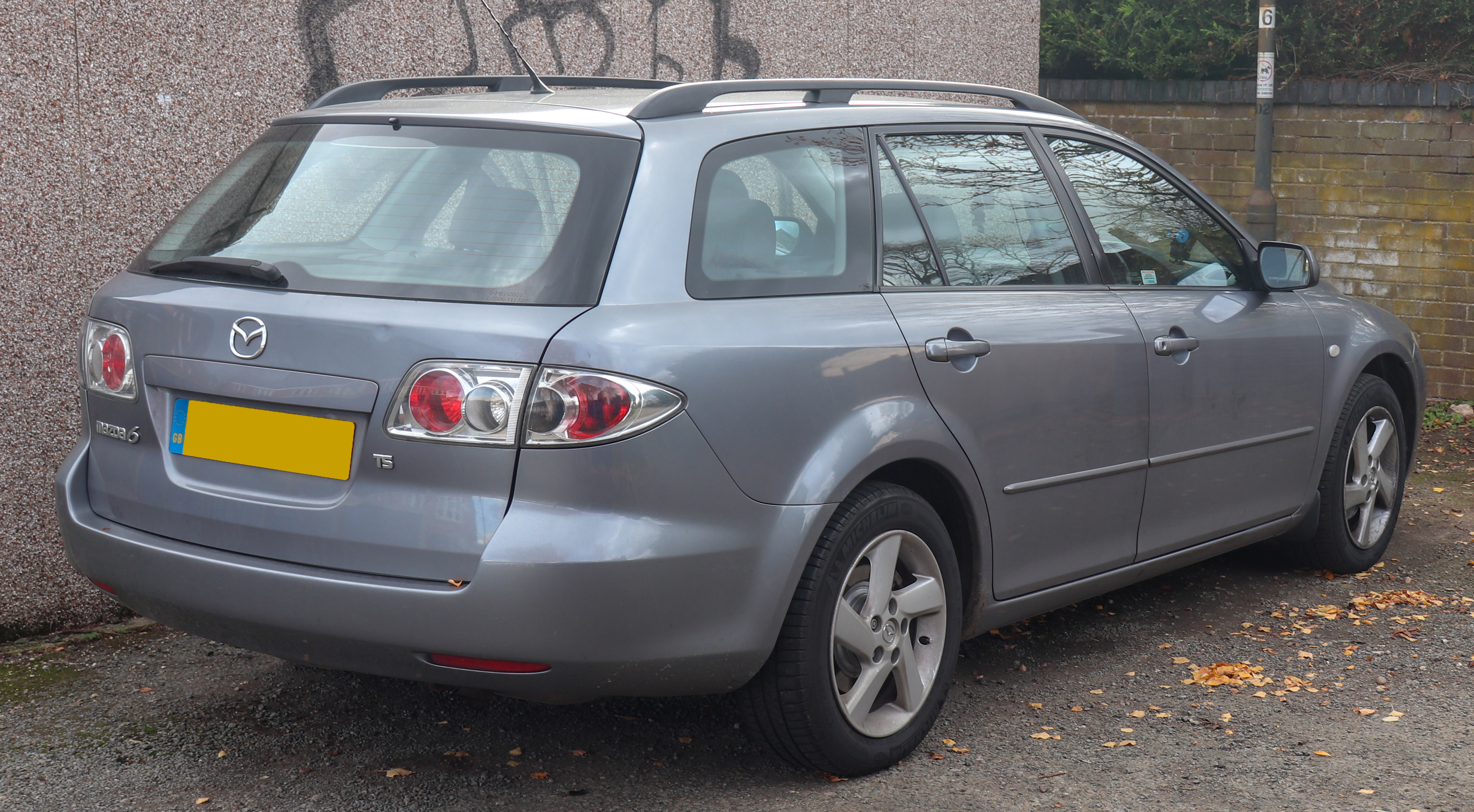
Estate/station wagon

The first-generation Mazda6 was launched in Japan as the Mazda Atenza in May 2002. The model lineup consisted of a four-door sedan, a four-door hatchback and a five-door wagon, marketed in North America as the "Sport Sedan", "5-Door" and "Sport Wagon", respectively. In Australia, the lineup was first available in Limited trim, as a sedan; in Classic trim as sedan, hatch or wagon and in Luxury trim as a sedan and liftback — and Luxury Sports trim, as a liftback. In New Zealand, the lineup consisted of 2.0L GLX (sedan only), 2.3L GSX (sedan, liftback, and wagon), and 2.3L Limited (sedan and liftback).

The first generation was marketed as a 2003 model in the United States and as a 2004 model in Canada. In Europe, the luxury sports model was available as a 120 hp (89 kW) direct injection turbodiesel ("DITD") estate up until 2007. As of 2008, the European Mazda catalog listed only the "Sport" version of the 146 hp (109 kW) turbodiesel estate, while the "Luxury Sport" version had been dropped.

Drivetrain combinations included the Mazda MZR engine in configurations of 1.8 L (L8-DE), 2.0 L (LF-VE) and 2.3 L (L3-VE), initially with a five-speed manual or four-speed automatic transmission (with a sequential-automatic option, dubbed the "Four-Speed Sport AT"). In the US domestic market a 3.0 L Duratec 30 V6 engine was also available with a five-speed manual or five-speed automatic (with a sequential-automatic option, dubbed the "5-Speed Sport AT"). European and Australian versions also feature a four-cylinder turbodiesel that comes with a six-speed manual transmission and produces significantly more torque than the V6, with much improved fuel economy.

Facelift
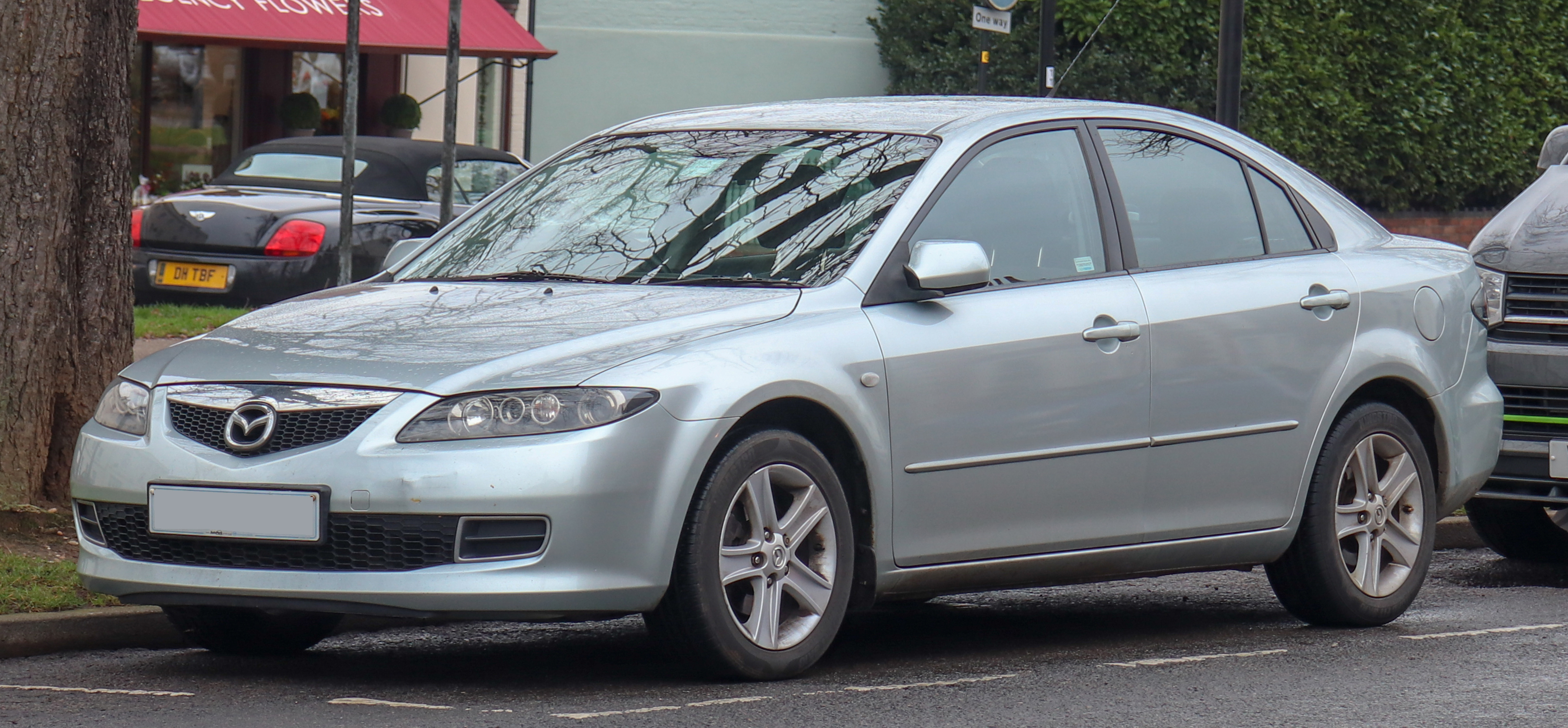

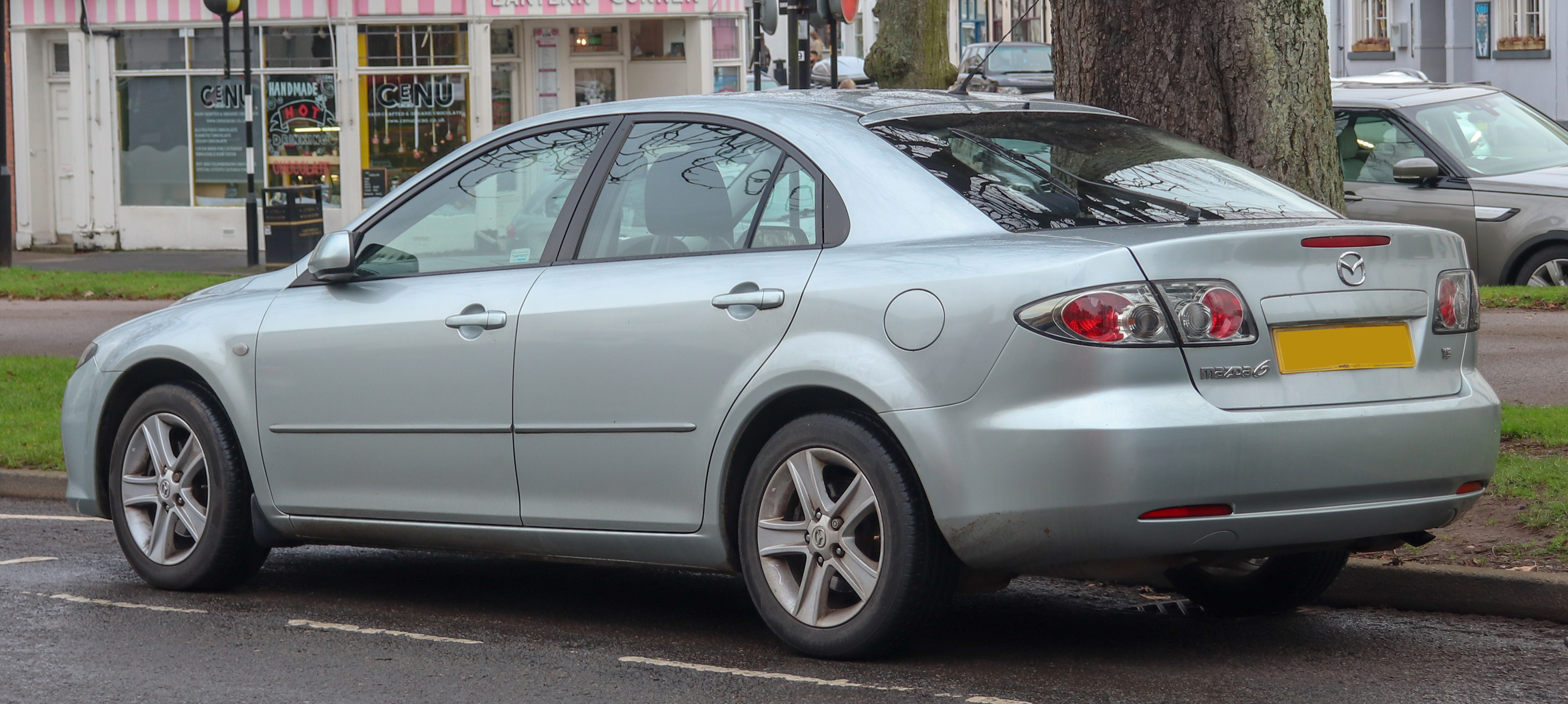
Liftback

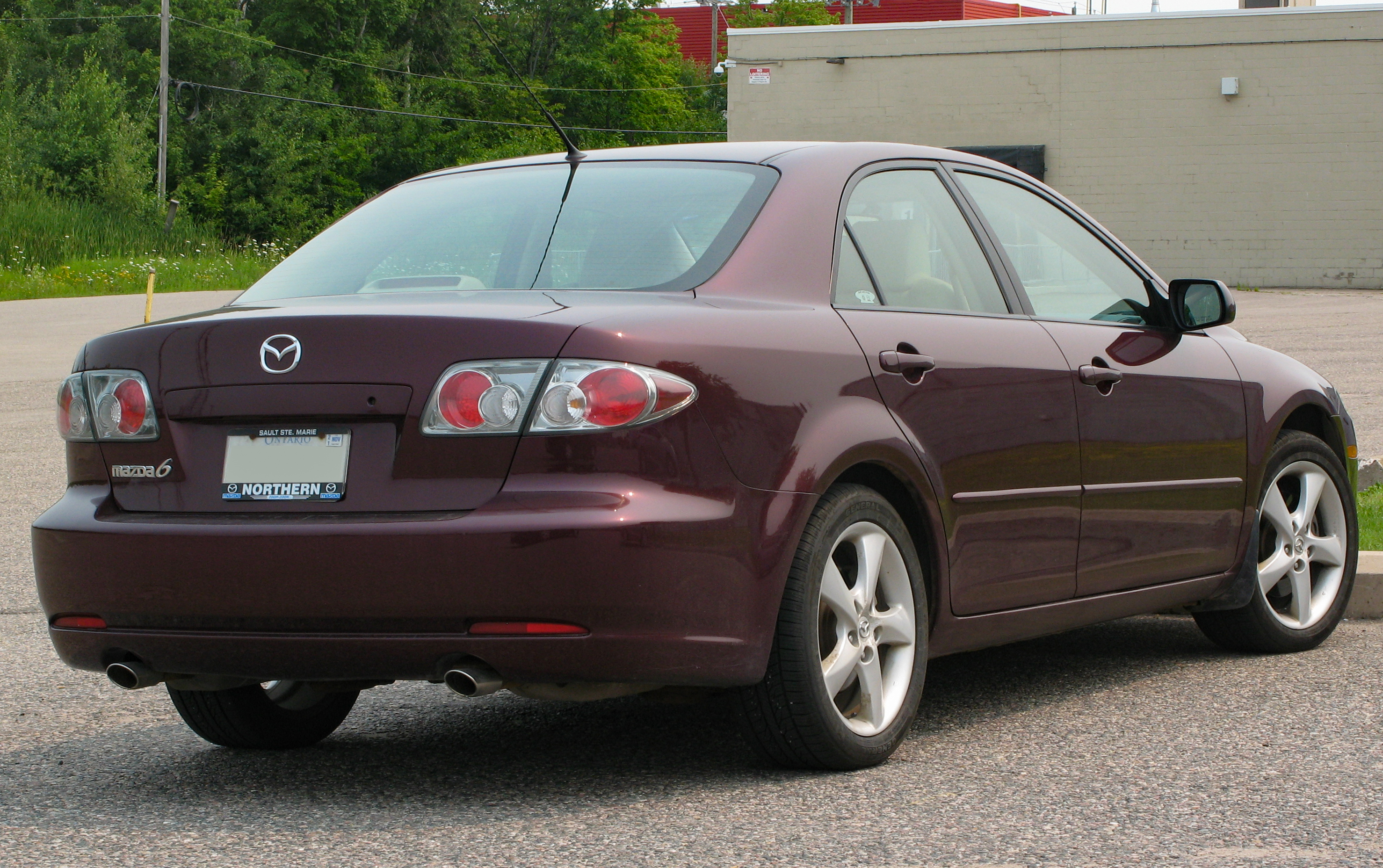
Sedan

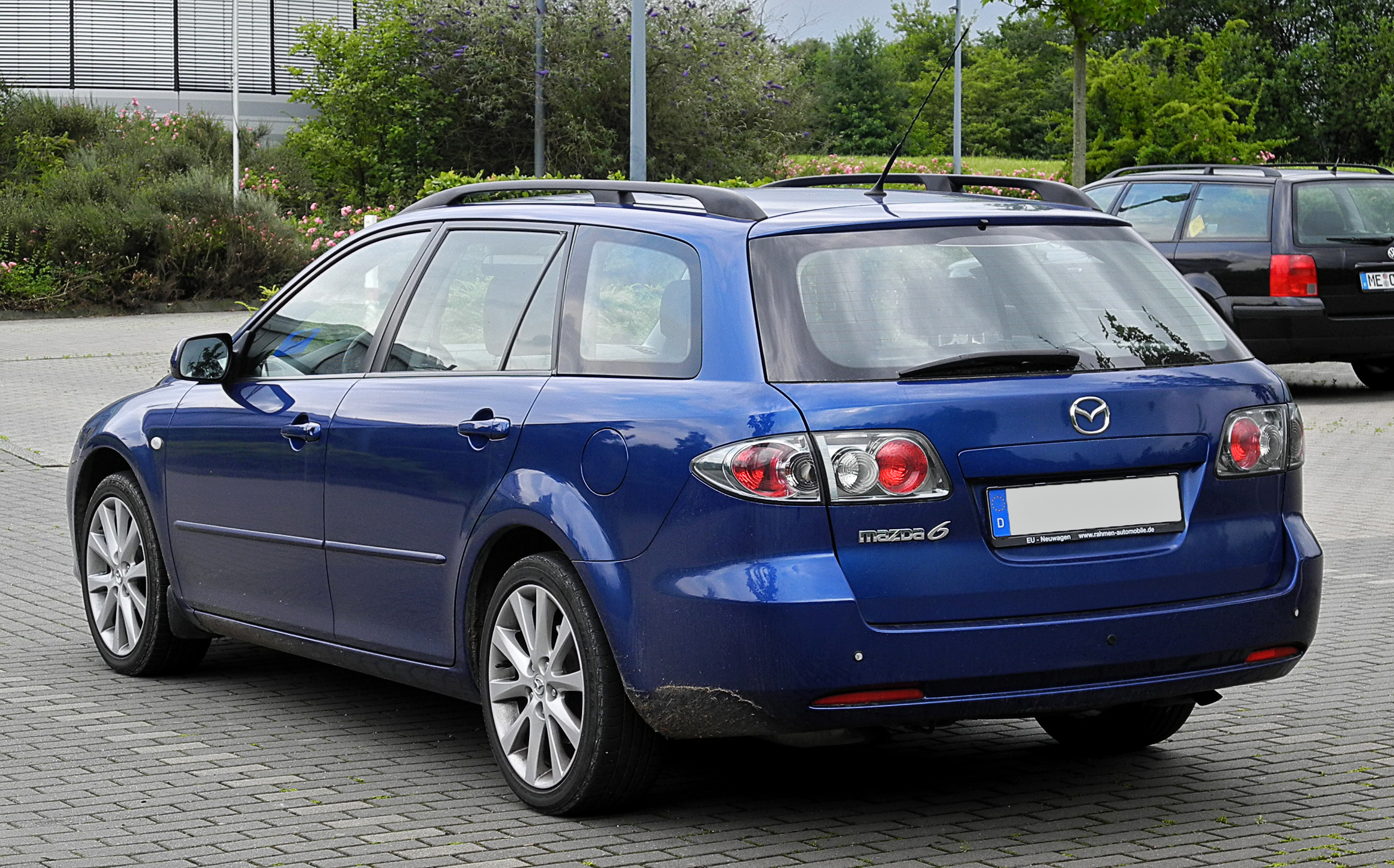
Estate/station wagon

In North America, the 5-speed automatic optional on the V6 models were replaced by an Aisin 6-speed automatic for the 2005 model year. The four-cylinder model received a FS5A-EL five-speed automatic in the following year. Power was directed to the front wheels in most markets, although full-time all-wheel-drive models were available in Japan, Europe, and Australia. Not all configurations were available in all areas – for example, the Mazda 6 as released in Australia was available in 2.3L four-cylinder guise only, when the 626 it replaced had been available with a choice of four- or six-cylinder engines. The MZI V6 engine was only fitted to vehicles manufactured at Mazda's Flat Rock Assembly Plant and destined for the U.S. and Canadian domestic markets.

Mazda's Hofu Plant in Yamaguchi Prefecture produced the Mazda6 for international markets from February 2002 to August 2007. In North America, Mazda6 production was handled at the AutoAlliance International plant in Flat Rock, Michigan. The first Mazda6 rolled off the AAI assembly line on October 1, 2002, one month after 626 production ended. There are also satellite plants building Mazda6 models in China and Thailand for local markets.

In September 2005, the Mazda6 received a facelift which introduced 5-speed auto and 6-speed manual transmissions, standard 16- or 17-inch alloy wheels, and minor bodywork upgrades.

In China, the Mazda6 was introduced by FAW Mazda in 2003. Despite the release of its successors, the first generation car, known locally as the Maliu (马六, "Horse 6"), continued to be manufactured at FAW's Changchun plant, having sold over 770,000 units as of 2014. This model was also used as the base for the Bestune B70.

=== Mazdaspeed6 ===
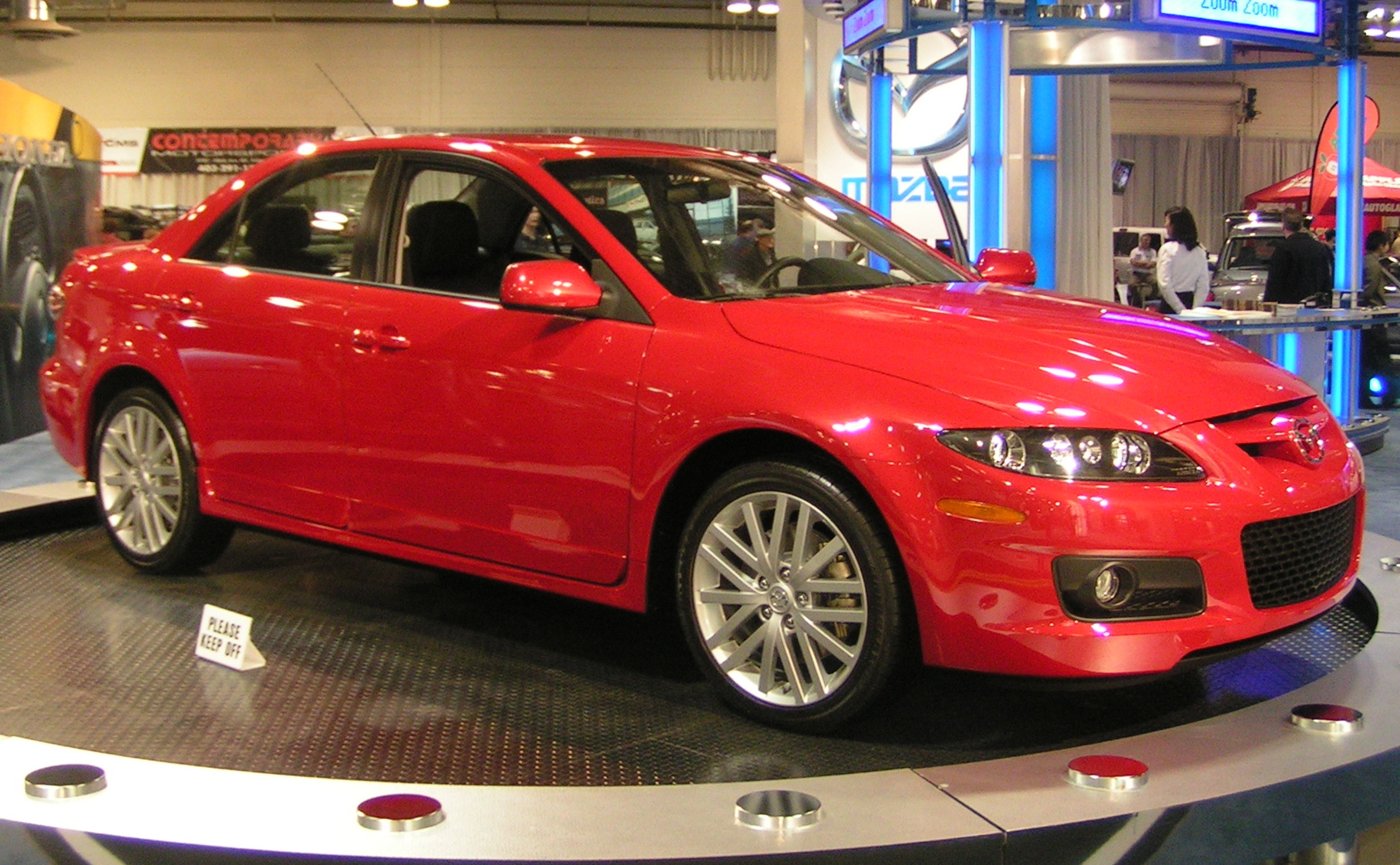
Mazdaspeed6

The 2006 Mazdaspeed6 (known as Mazdaspeed Atenza in Japan and Mazda6 MPS in Europe, South Africa and Australia) is a high-performance version of the first generation Mazda6. Its mission statement was written with the help of Peter Birtwhistle, chief of Mazda's advanced design studio in Germany at the time. It was initially unveiled as a concept at the 2002 Paris Motor Show. It features a turbocharged version of the 2.3 L MZR inline-four which produces 272 PS (200 kW), although the European version was detuned to 260 PS (191 kW) as a result of stricter emissions standards. The North American version originally produced 274 hp (204 kW), which was revised to 270 hp (201 kW) for 2007. All models have 280 lb⋅ft (380 N⋅m) of torque. The 2.3 L DISI turbocharged engine features direct fuel injection and conforms to the new Euro 5 emissions standards. All markets received a revised front fascia with a raised hood, a 6-speed manual transmission, and all-wheel drive. The all-wheel-drive system uses Mazda's Active Torque Split computer-based control, which can route between a 100/0 to 50/50 front/rear torque split depending on driving conditions. Power is sent to the rear wheels through a limited-slip differential.

Originally scheduled to be launched in June 2005, the Mazdaspeed Atenza was delayed until November. In North America, the Mazdaspeed6 comes in two trim levels; the "Sport" trim with cloth interior and standard key entry and ignition; and the "Grand Touring" trim with leather interior, keyless entry/ignition, and optional DVD navigation. Automatic climate control is standard, as is a 200 W Bose stereo system featuring seven speakers and a 9-inch subwoofer in addition to an in-dash six-disc CD changer. A sunroof with moonroof feature is optional on the Grand Touring trim.

The Mazdaspeed6 was released to generally positive reviews, and was noted for impressive power and handling.

=== Safety ===
ANCAP test results* Mazda 6 (2003)
Test	Score
Overall	4 /5 stars
Frontal offset	11.23/16
Side impact	13.04/16
Pole	2/2
Seat belt reminders	0/3
Whiplash protection	Not Assessed
Pedestrian protection	Poor
Electronic stability control	Not Assessed

ANCAP test results* Mazda 6 5 door hatch (2005)
Test	Score
Overall	4 /5 stars
Frontal offset	11.71/16
Side impact	14.49/16
Pole	2/2
Seat belt reminders	0/3
Whiplash protection	Not Assessed
Pedestrian protection	Poor
Electronic stability control	Not Assessed

== Second generation (GH1/GH2; 2007) ==
Second generation
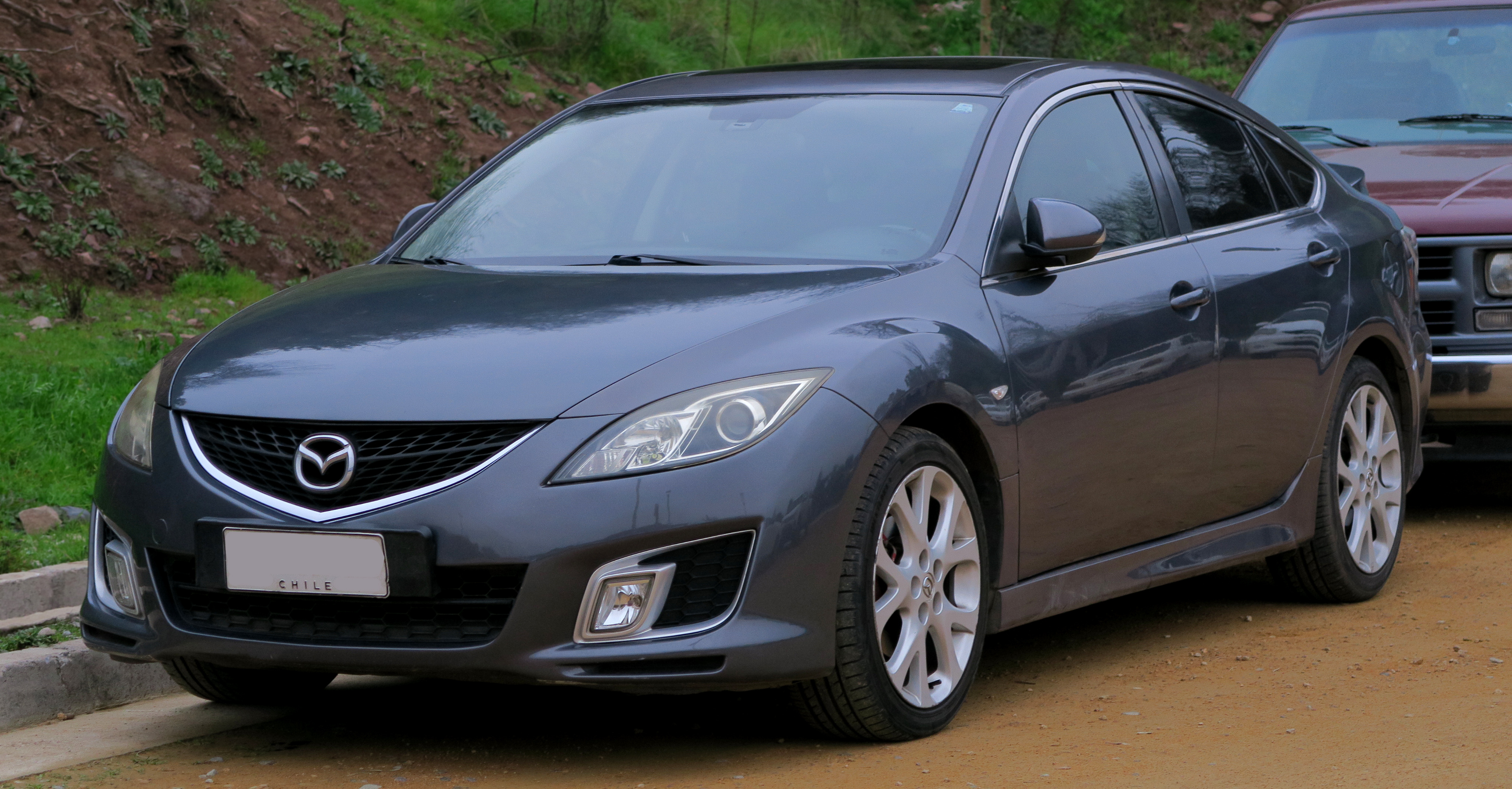
- Pre-facelift

Overview
- Model code: GH1 / GH2 / GZ
- Production: August 2007 – August 2012; 2009–2016 (China)
- Model years: 2009–2013 (North America)
- Assembly: China: Changchun (FAW Group); Japan: Hofu, Yamaguchi (Hofu Plant No. 2); United States: Flat Rock, Michigan (Flat Rock Assembly Plant)
- Designer: Koichi Sato (2005)

Body and chassis
- Body style: 4-door sedan; 5-door liftback; 5-door wagon
- Related: Ford Edge; Ford Fusion; Lincoln MKX; Lincoln MKZ; Mazda8; Mazda CX-9; Mercury Milan

Powertrain
- Engine: Gasoline: 1.8 L MZR L8 I4; 2.0 L MZR LF I4; 2.5 L MZR L5 I4; 3.7 L Duratec 37 V6; Diesel: 2.0 L MZR-CD I4; 2.2 L MZR-CD I4
- Transmission: 5-speed manual; 5-speed FS5A-EL automatic; 6-speed G36M-R manual; 6-speed AWTF-80 SC automatic

Dimensions
- Wheelbase: International: 2,725 mm (107.3 in); North America: 109.8 in (2,789 mm)
- Length: Sedan and hatchback (2007–2010): 4,735 mm (186.4 in); Sedan and hatchback (2011–2012): 4,755 mm (187.2 in); Wagon (2007–2010): 4,765 mm (187.6 in); Wagon (2011–2012): 4,785 mm (188.4 in); North America: 4,920 mm (193.7 in)
- Width: International: 1,795 mm (70.7 in); North America: 72.4 in (1,839 mm)
- Height: Sedan and hatchback: 1,440 mm (56.7 in); Wagon: 1,490 mm (58.7 in)

The second-generation Mazda6 made its premiere at the 2007 Frankfurt Motor Show in September. It is based on the modified first-generation Mazda6 chassis which Ford also utilized as their CD3 platform. Mazda continued to provide three body styles, including 4-door saloon (sedan), 5-door hatchback and wagon. A number of journalists praised its electrically assisted steering for being considerably improved compared to the previous generation, providing more feedback to the driver. The hatchback model even has a trunk space which beats the larger rival Ford Mondeo and Opel/Vauxhall Insignia (hatchback) by 200 liters with rear seats folded down.

This model of the Mazda6 was awarded 2010 Family Car of the Year by What Car? magazine.

At the 2010 Geneva Motor Show, Mazda announced their new 2011 Mazda6.

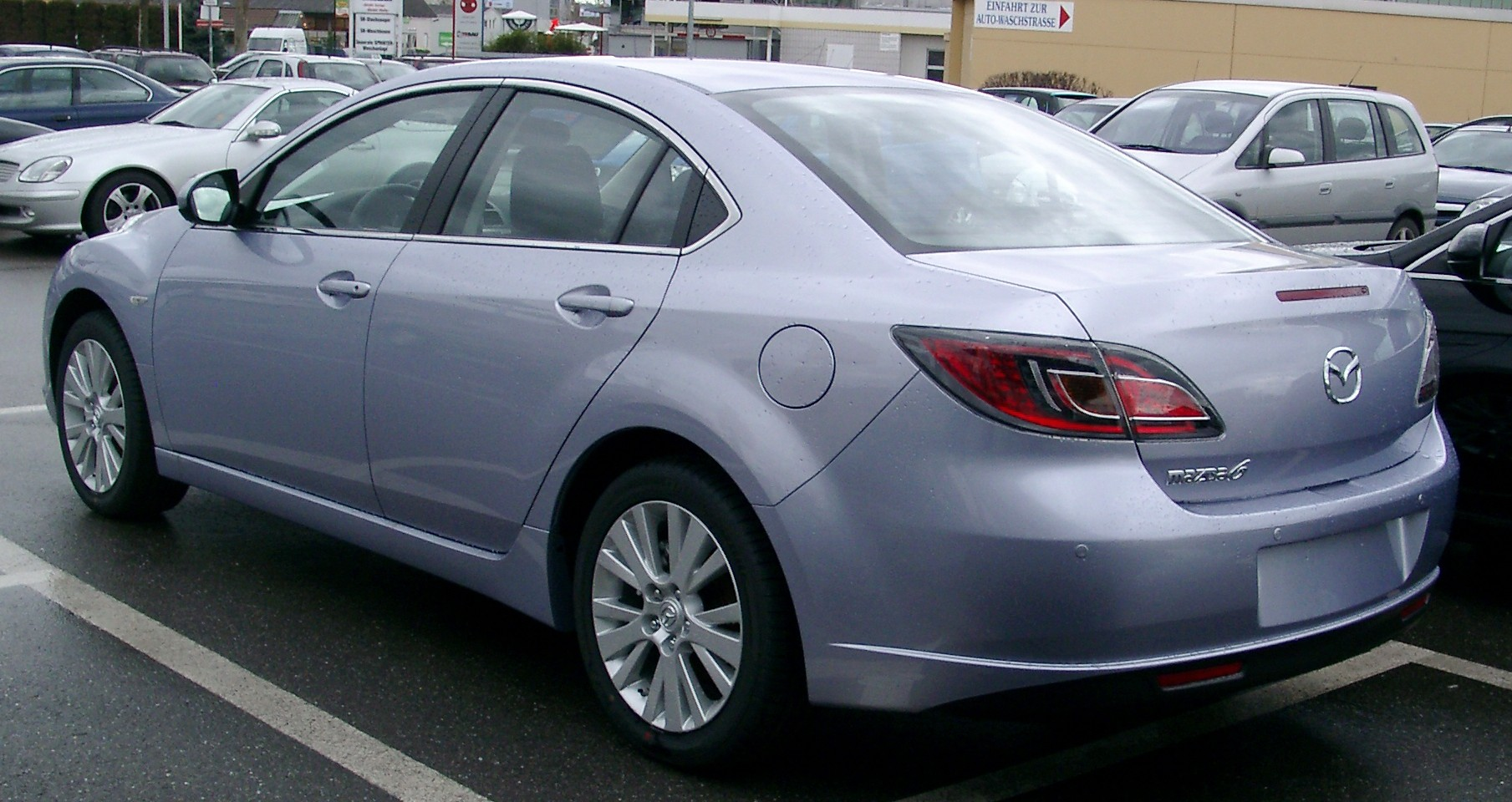
Sedan (rear)

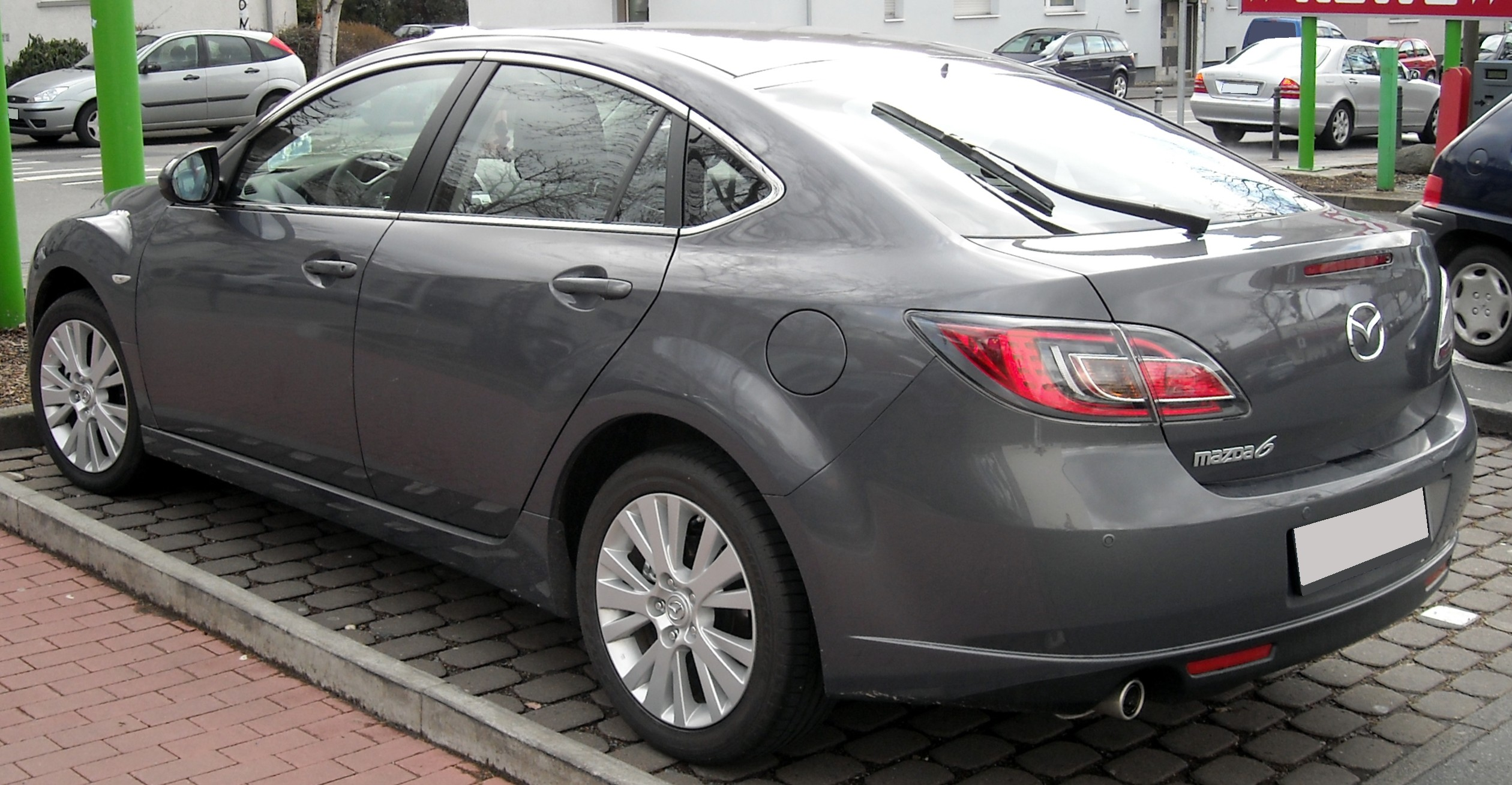
Liftback (rear)

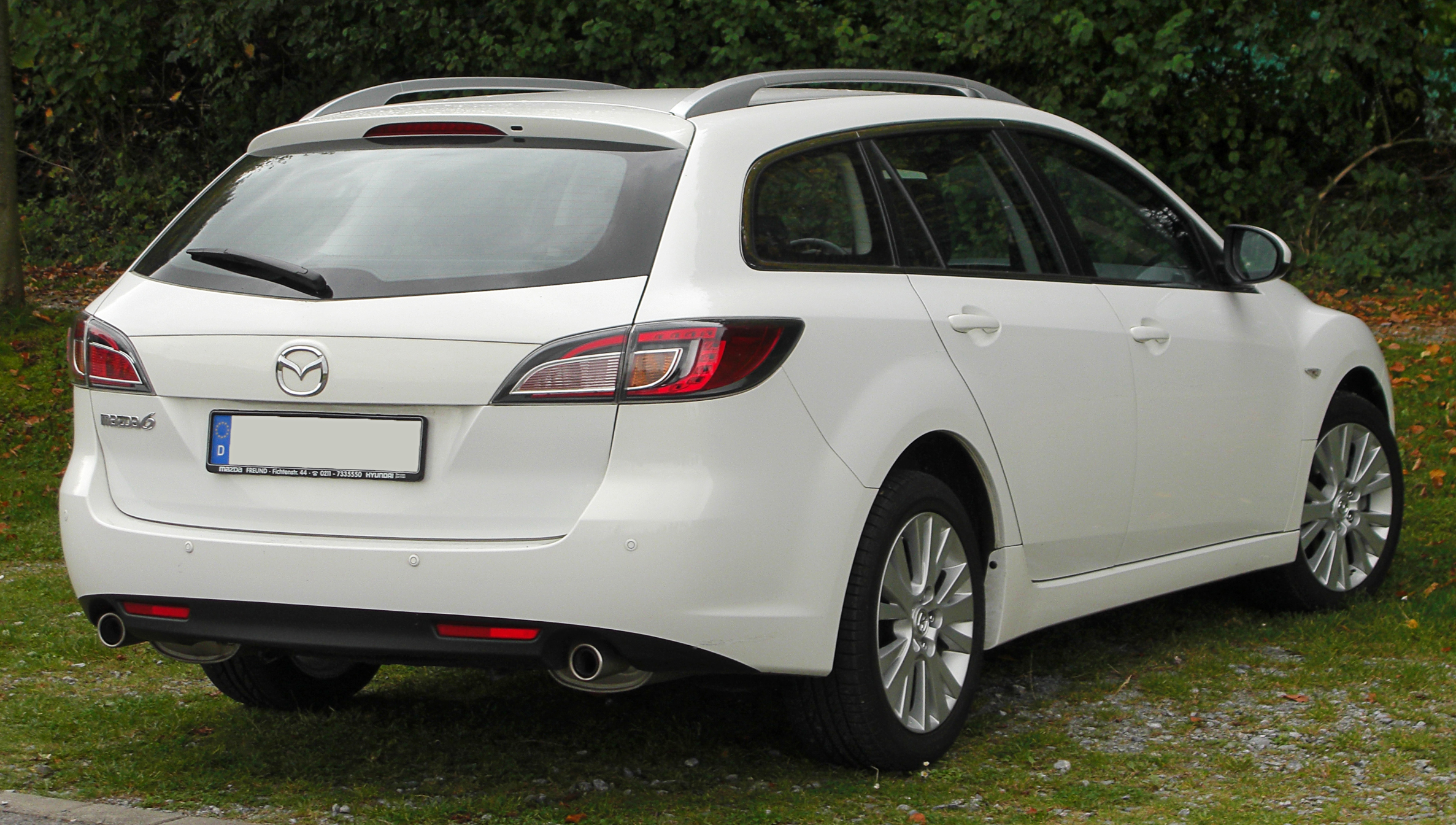
Estate (rear)

=== Facelift ===
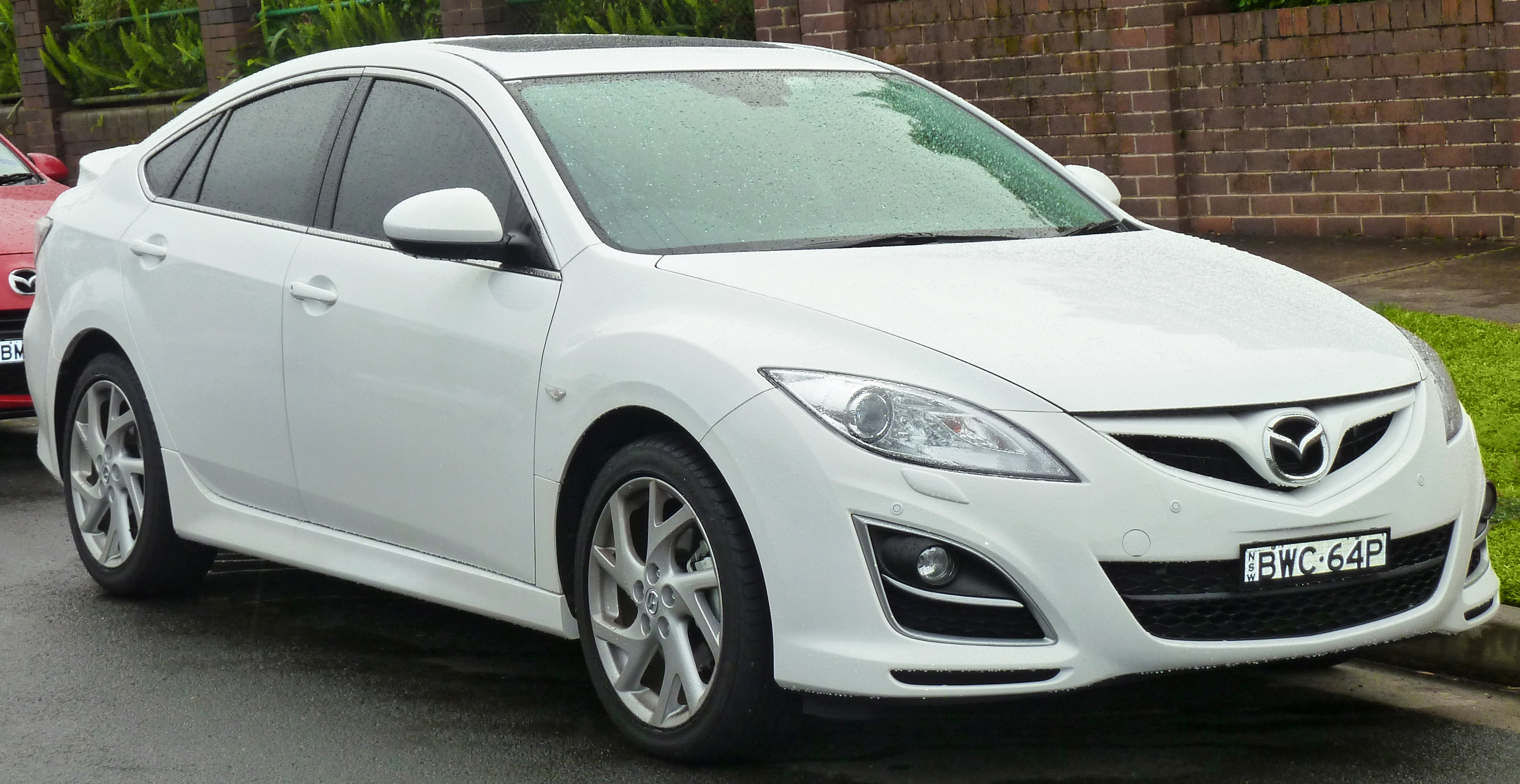
Mazda 6 Sports hatchback (facelift; front)

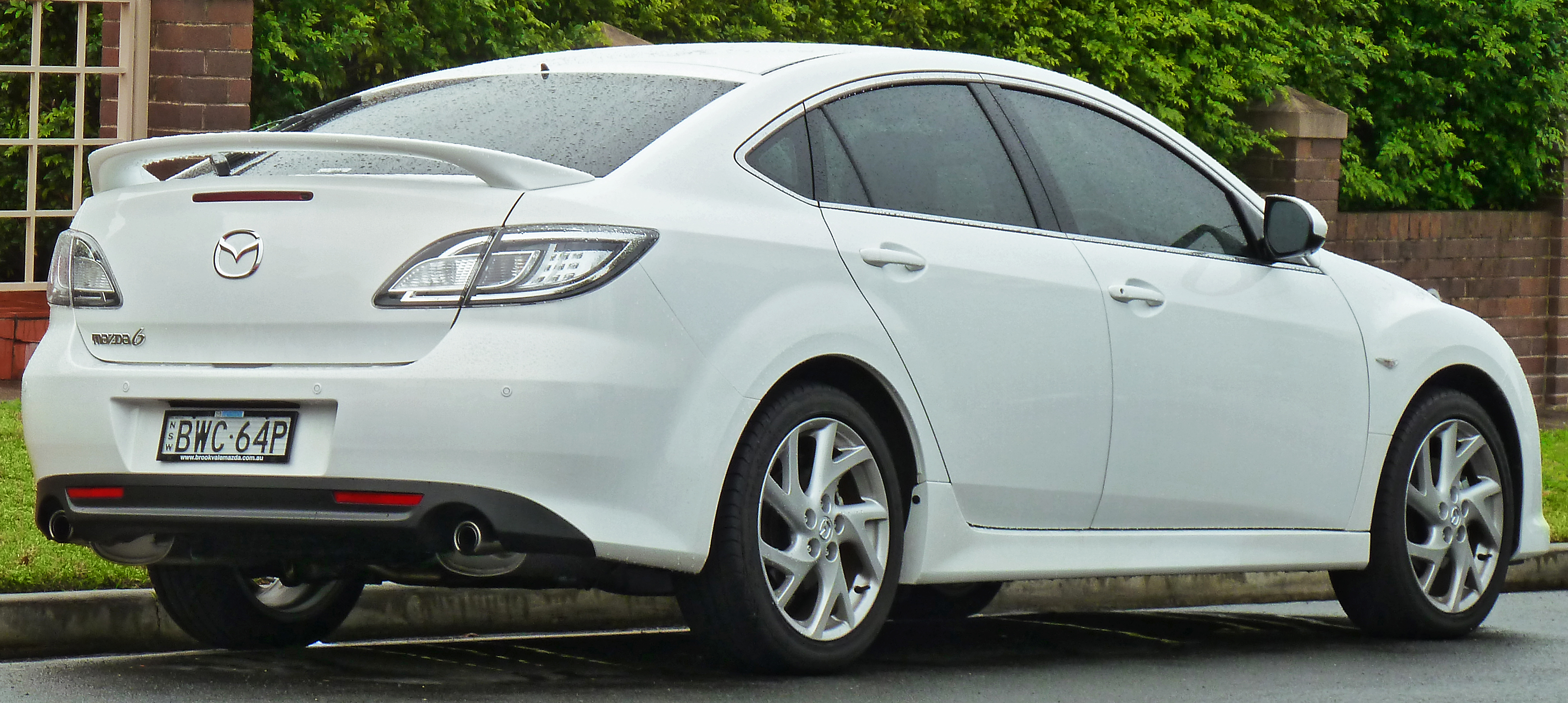
Liftback (facelift; rear)

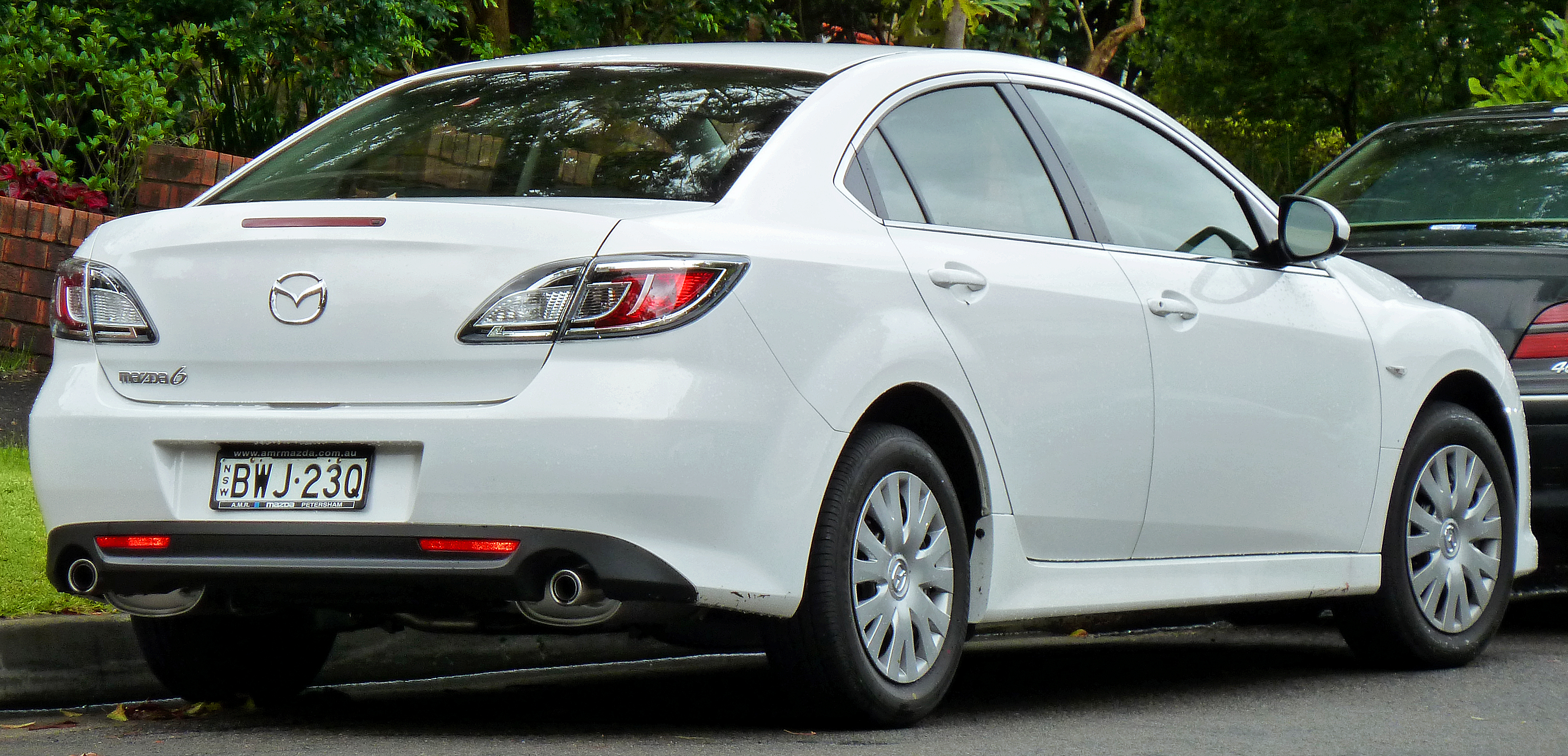
Sedan

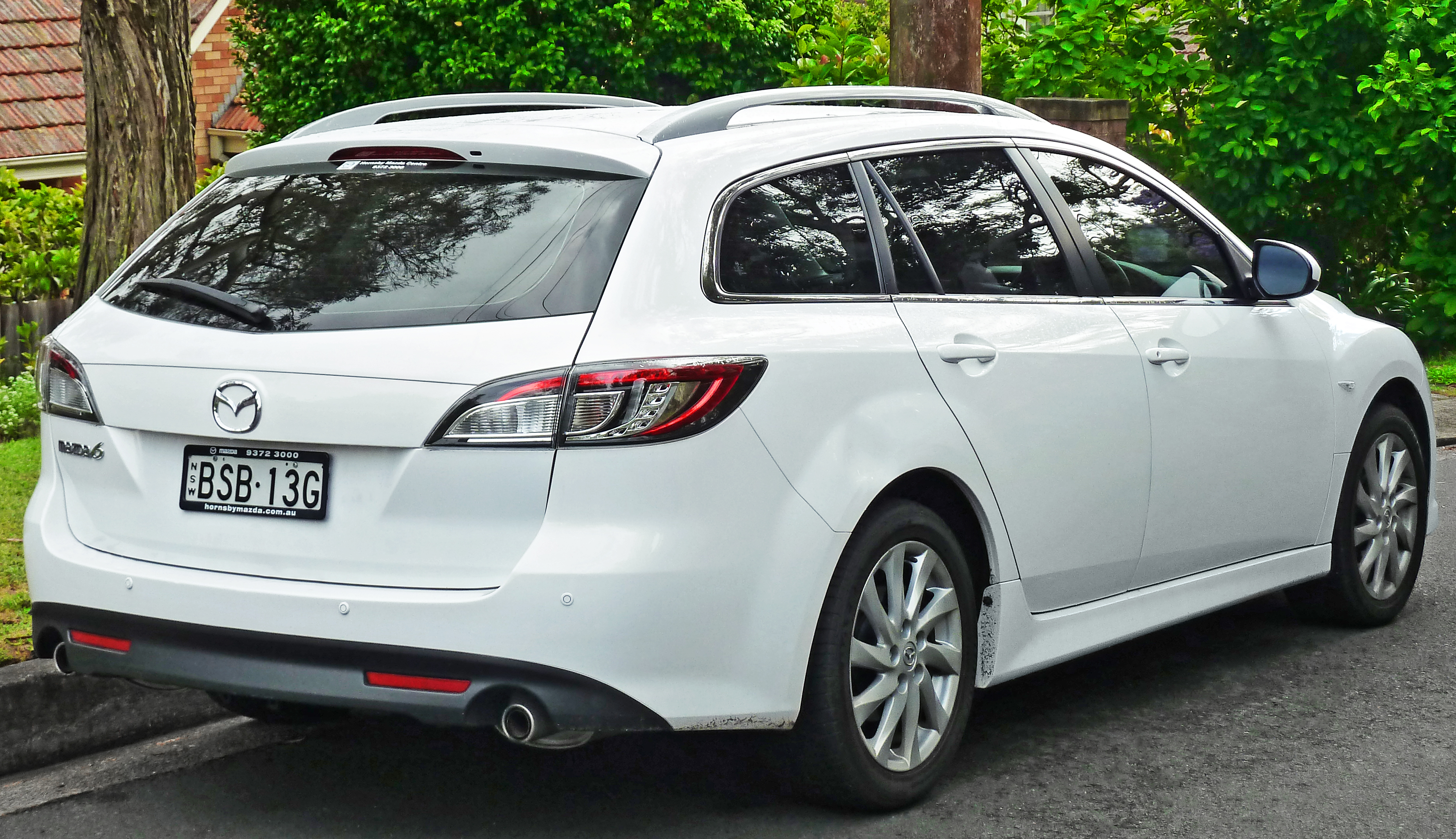
Estate/station wagon

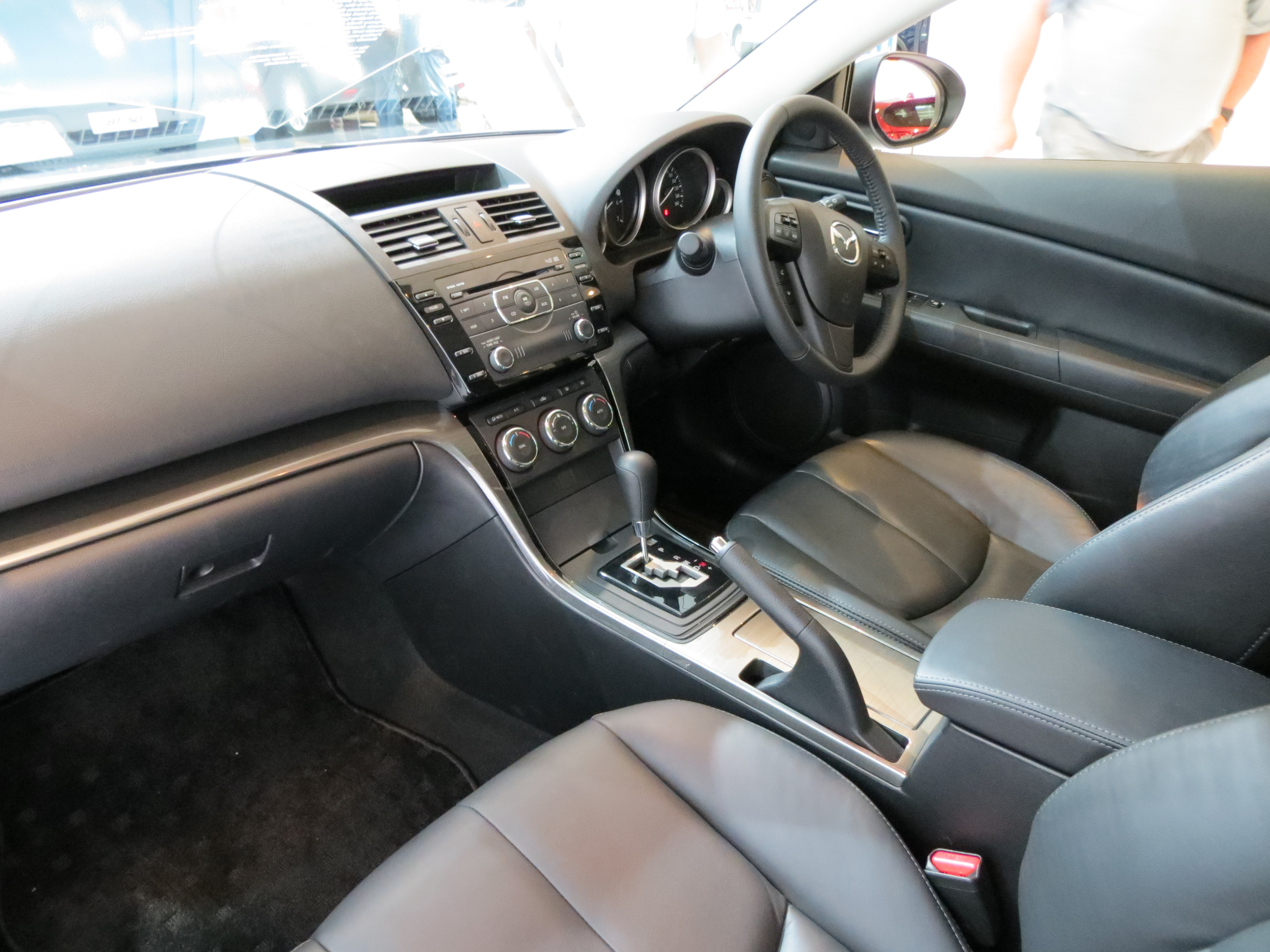
Interior

=== North America ===
The North American version was redesigned for the 2009 model year, with the wagon and hatchback versions being dropped there. It is a widened and lengthened version of the model sold elsewhere, with larger engines. Reviewers have noted its coupe-like roofline and sportier style. North American engine choices include a new 2.5-liter 4-cylinder and North American versions get the 3.7-liter V6 which is also available in the Mazda CX-9. Motor Trend recorded a 0–60 mph acceleration time of 6.1 seconds for the Mazda 6 V6.

In America, only a sedan model was available (In the Middle East, USDM Mazda6 known as Mazda6 Ultra is sold alongside the JDM Mazda6). A Mazdaspeed6 variant was not offered. Despite the North American version's increase in dimensions, Mazda maintains that the 6 retains the overall driving experience is still sportier than rivaling Honda Accords, Toyota Camrys, or Chevrolet Malibus. Early reviews have been favorable.

On March 3, 2011, around 50,000 Mazda6 vehicles from the 2009–10 model years were recalled in the United States, with another 15,000 in Canada, Mexico and Puerto Rico after it was found that Yellow Sac Spiders were building nests in the fuel line of the vehicles. The Mazda6 has two pipes coming from its gas tank, an extremely rare configuration. Media reports claimed that the amount of gasoline vapor in the fuel line was just strong enough to draw the spider, but not strong enough to kill it. However, this theory was later debunked, instead it was shown that the material of the fuel line itself attracts the spiders. On April 5, 2014, Mazda reissued the same recall for spiders against all 2010–2013 Mazda6 vehicles with 2.5 liter engines.

Production for North American market would be transferred to Hofu, Japan, when Mazda ceased production at the Flat Rock Assembly Plant.

The last Mazda6 rolled off the line at Mazda's Flat Rock Assembly Plant on Friday, August 24, 2012, with Mazda discontinuing production on American soil, effectively ending the 20 year joint-venture between Mazda and Ford. Mazda moved production of the Mazda6 back to the Hofu factory in Japan.

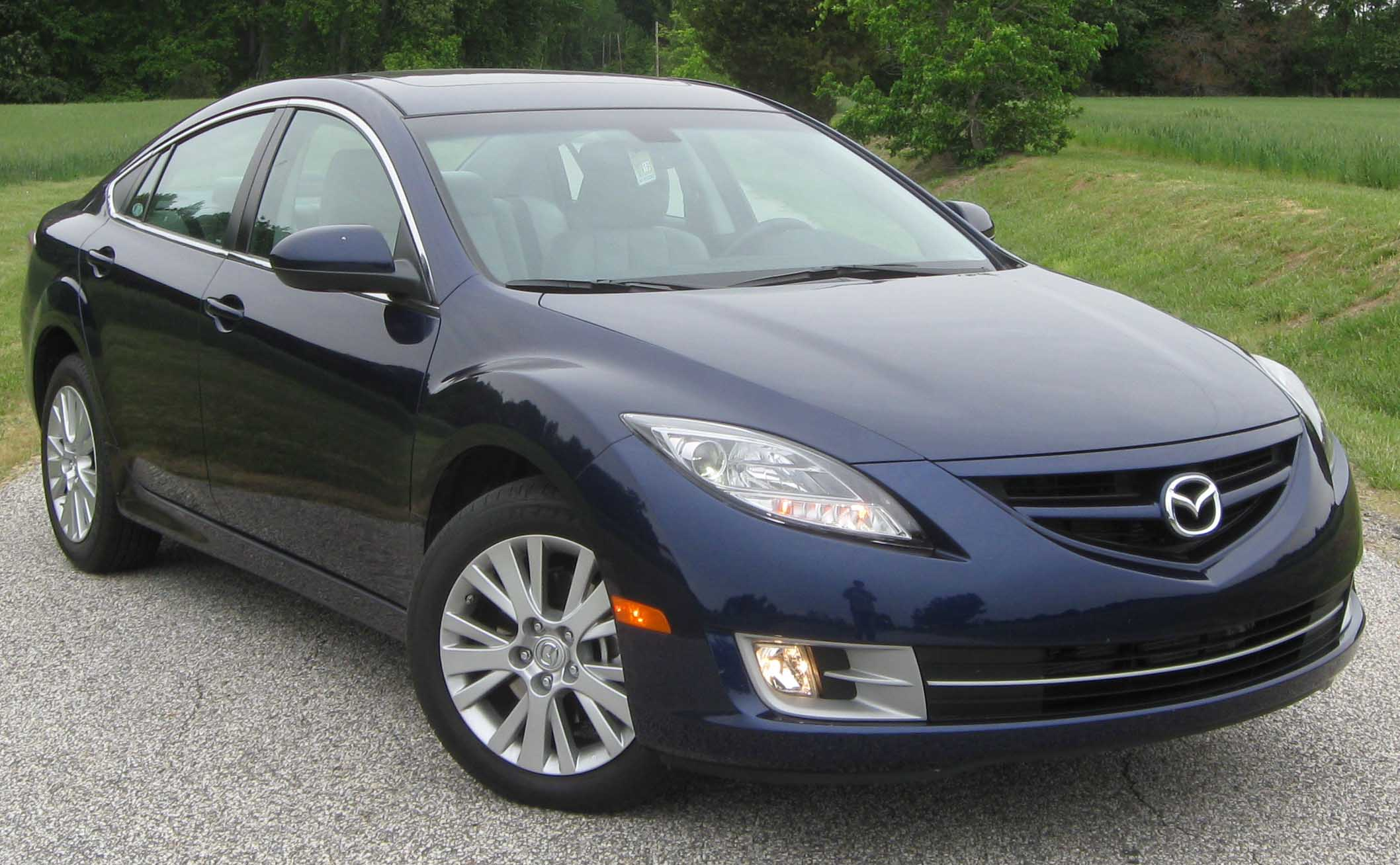
Mazda6 (North American version)

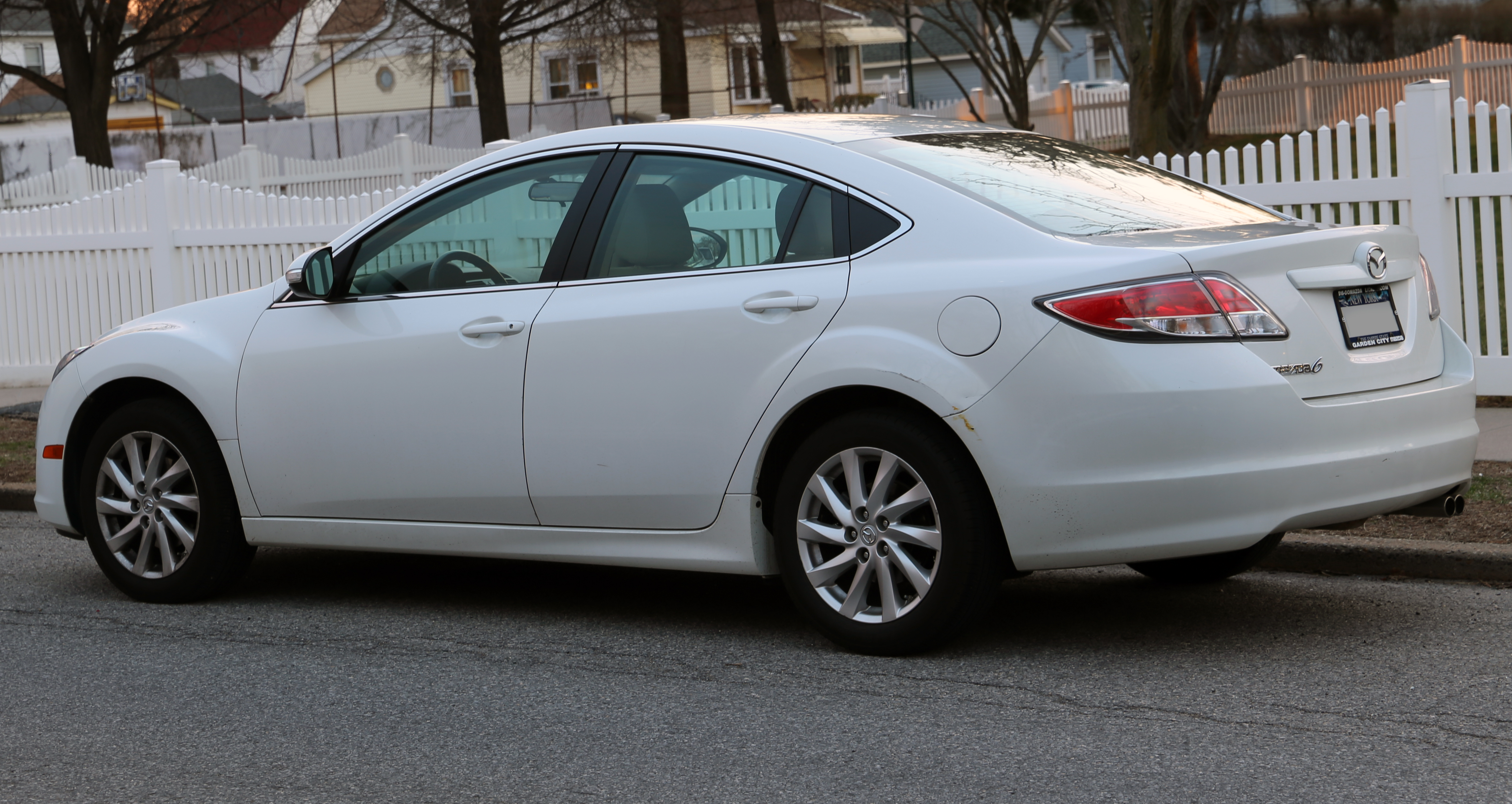
Rear view

=== Recall ===
In China, over 680,000 Mazdas, including Mazda6 made between September 2008 and January 2016, were recalled due to faulty airbags. An earlier recall involved 280,000 Mazda6 models made between 2003 and 2008 for a similar issue.

=== Safety ===
ANCAP test results* Mazda 6 (2008)
Test	Score
Overall	5 /5 stars
Frontal offset	13.25/16
Side impact	15.48/16
Pole	2/2
Seat belt reminders	2/3
Whiplash protection	Not Assessed
Pedestrian protection	Marginal
Electronic stability control	Standard

=== Motorsport ===
In 2007, Mazda won its first manufacturers championship in the Touring Car class. In 2009, they finished 2nd in the manufacturer's championship with 65 points, behind Acura.

The Mazda6 has also been used in the KONI Challenge Series Sport Touring class. It was last used in 2008 by the Baglieracing team with Dennis Baglier, Chris Gleason, and Marty Luffy as drivers.

The Mazda6 also gives its name to a stock car in the NASCAR Corona Series.

== Third generation (GJ1/GL; 2012) ==
Third generation
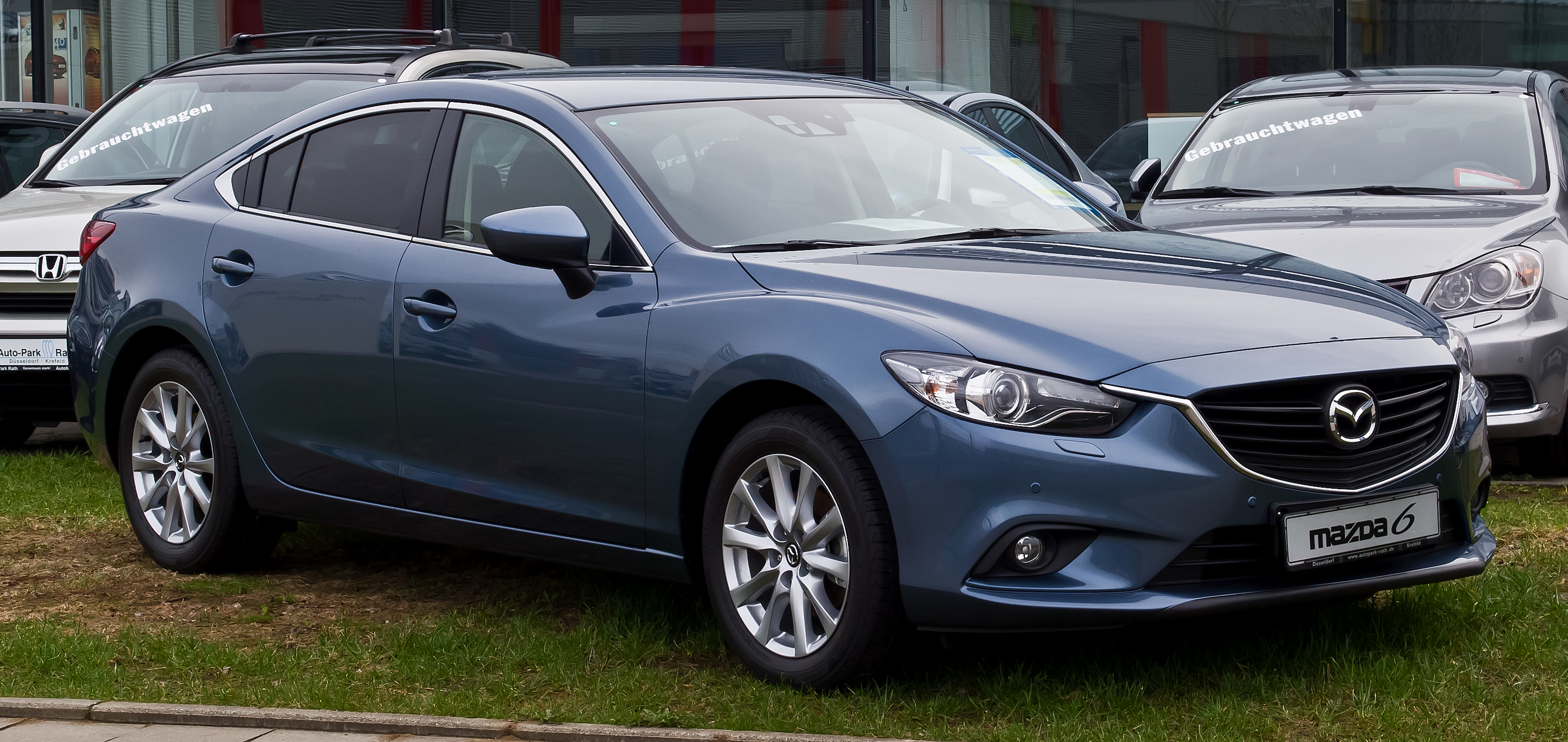
- Pre-facelift

Overview
- Model code: GJ1 / GL
- Production: 2012–2024
- Model years: 2014–2021

Dimensions
- Wheelbase: Sedan: 2,830 mm (111.4 in); Wagon: 2,750 mm (108.3 in)
- Length: Sedan: 4,865 mm (191.5 in); Wagon: 4,805 mm (189.2 in)
- Width: 1,840 mm (72.4 in)
- Height: Sedan: 1,450 mm (57.1 in); Wagon: 1,480 mm (58.3 in)

The third generation Mazda6 sedan was unveiled during Moscow International Automobile Salon on 29 August 2012, and the station wagon version followed during the 2012 Paris Motor Show in the following month. This generation is available in a 4-door sedan or 5-door station wagon styles only. The design was previewed by both the Takeri concept, unveiled at the 2011 Tokyo Motor Show, and the Shinari concept from 2010.

The design was a finalist in the "2013 World Design of the Year".

=== Pre-facelift ===
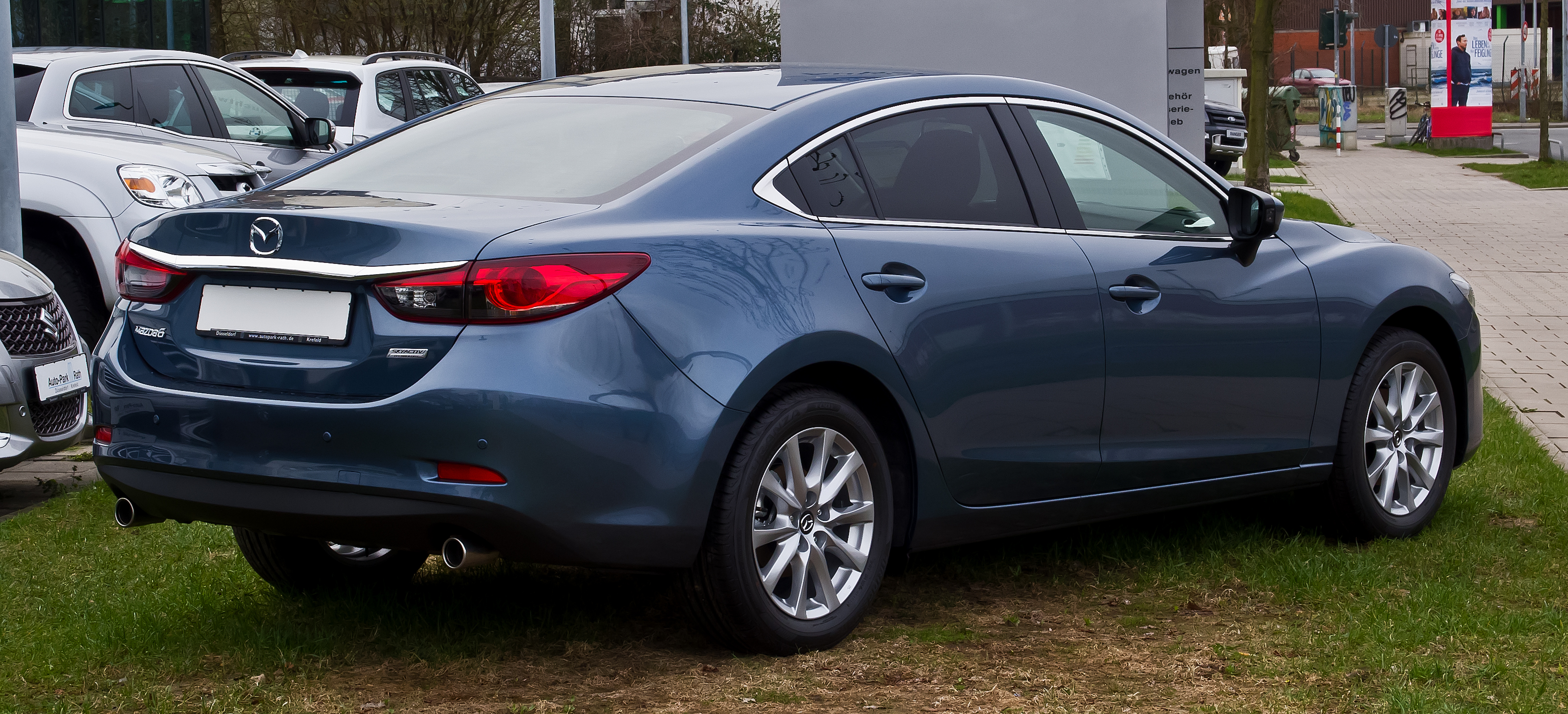
Sedan (pre-facelift)

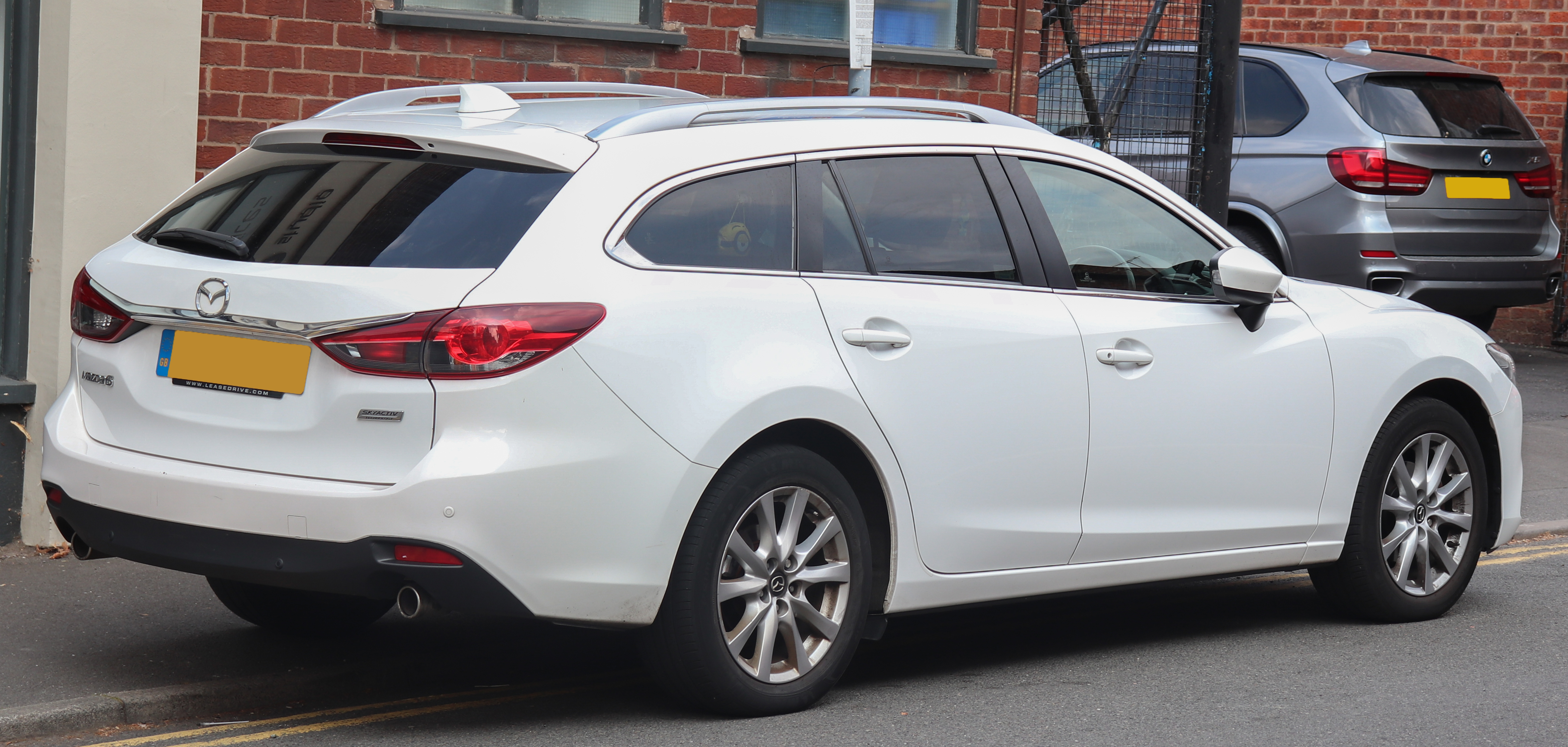
Estate/station wagon (pre-facelift)

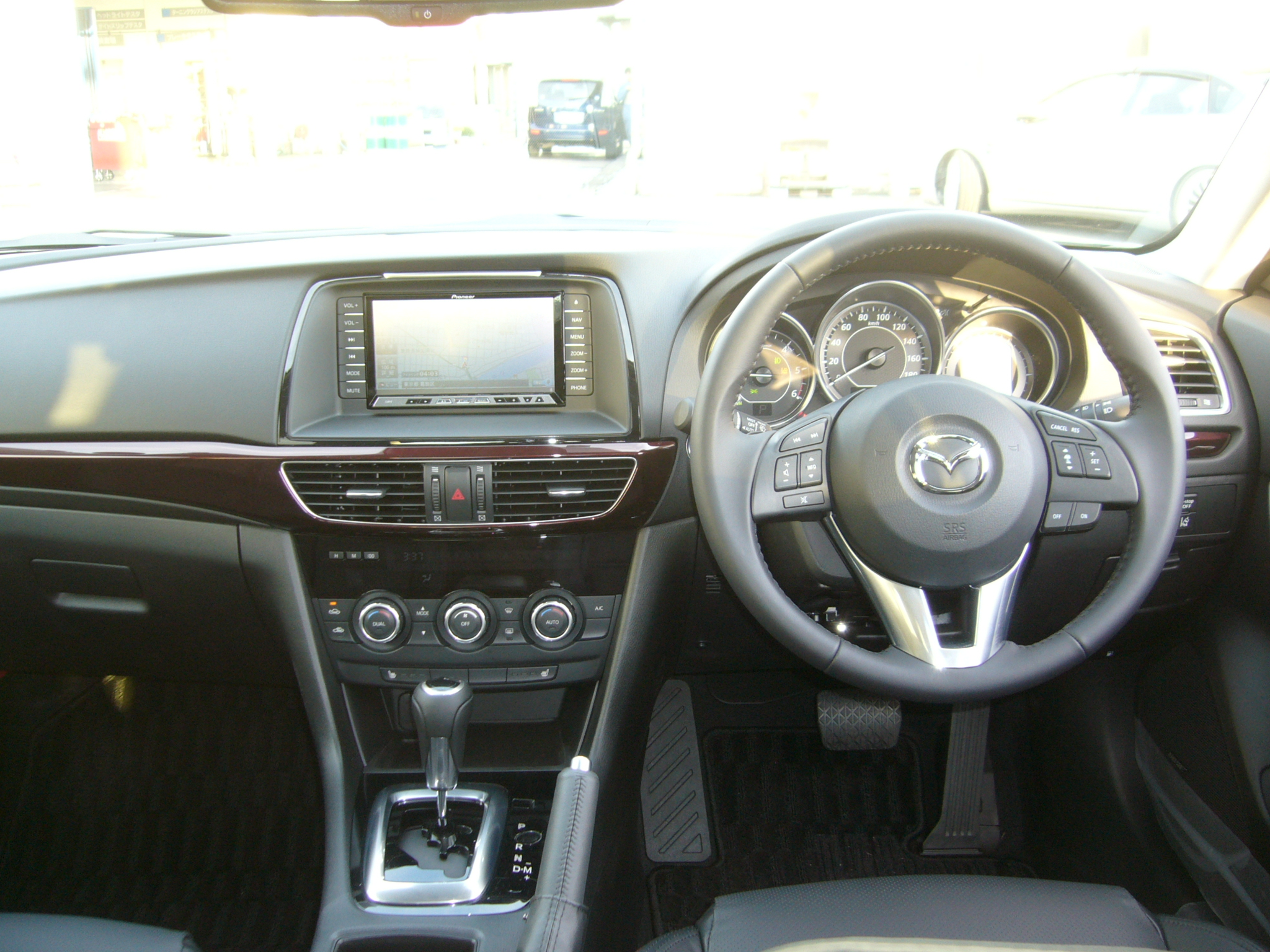
Interior (pre-facelift)

=== Facelift ===
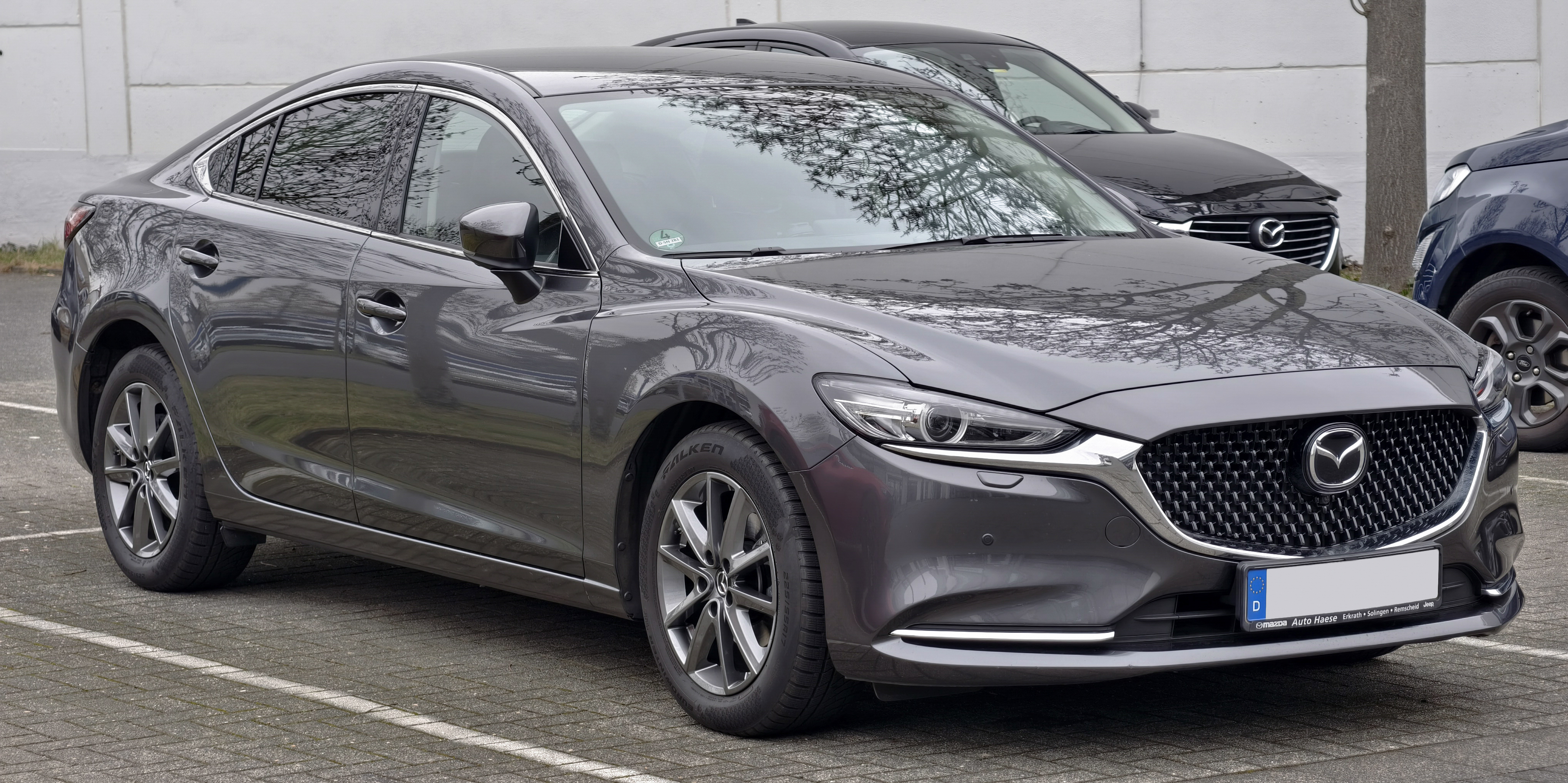
Sedan (facelift)

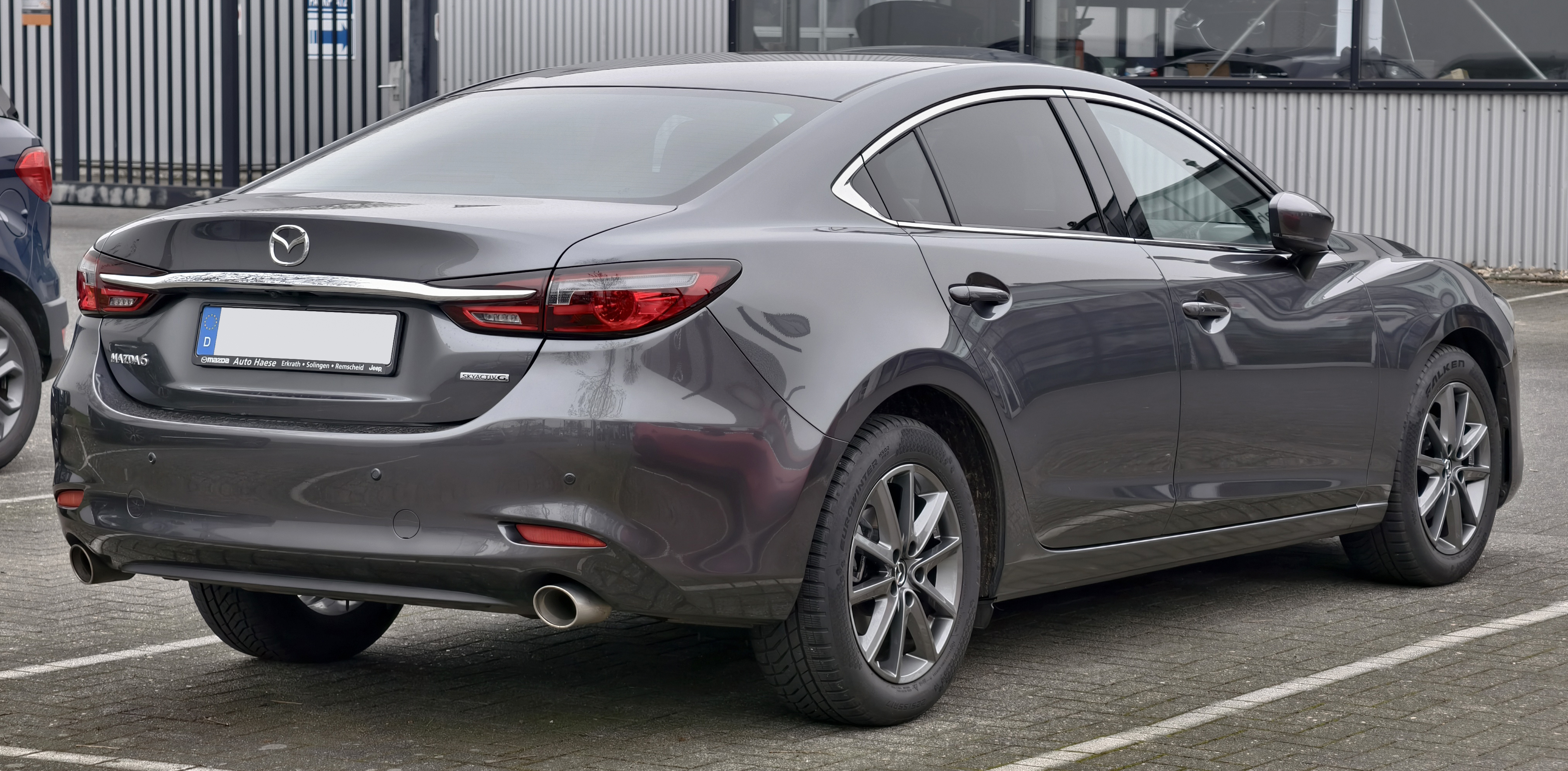
Sedan (facelift)

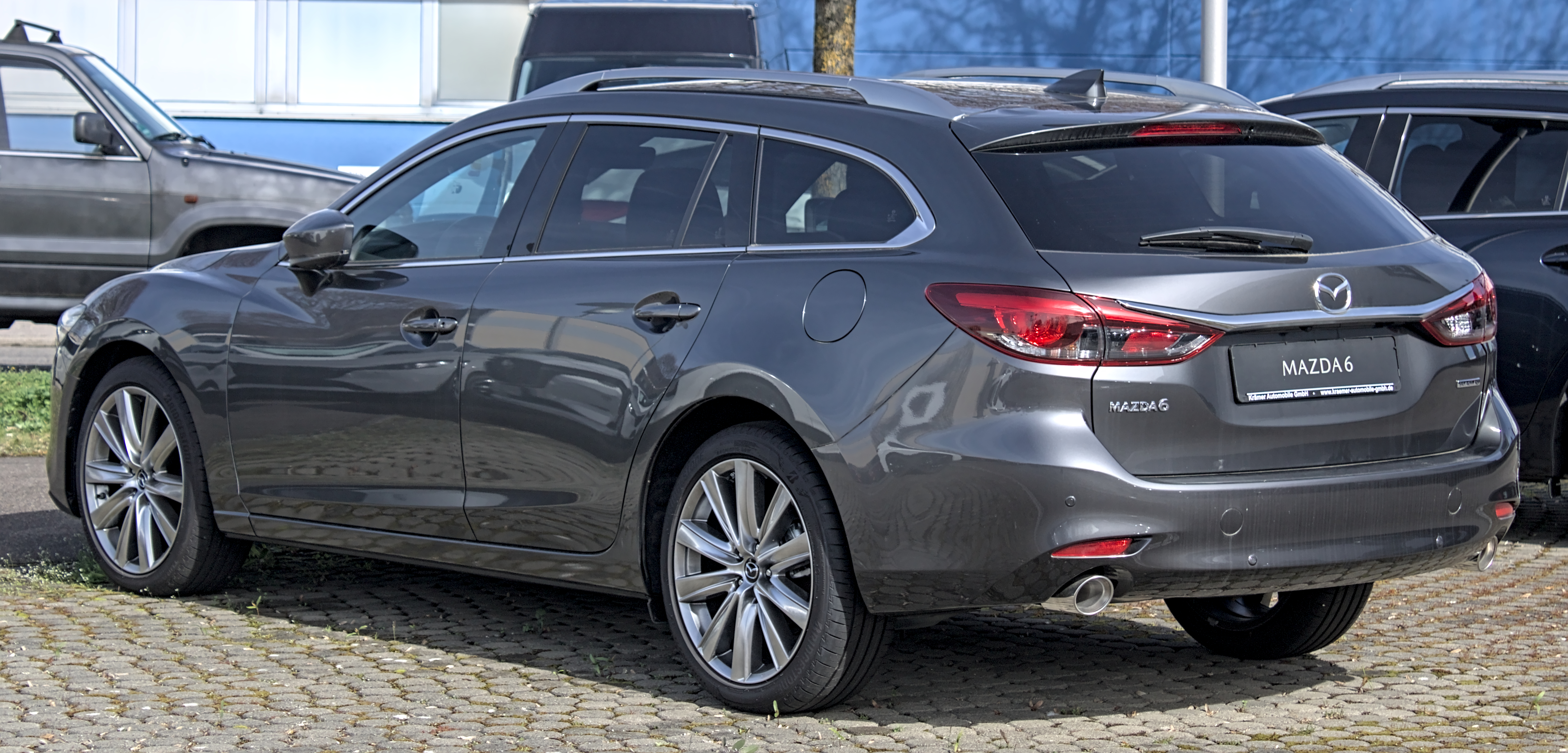
Estate (facelift)

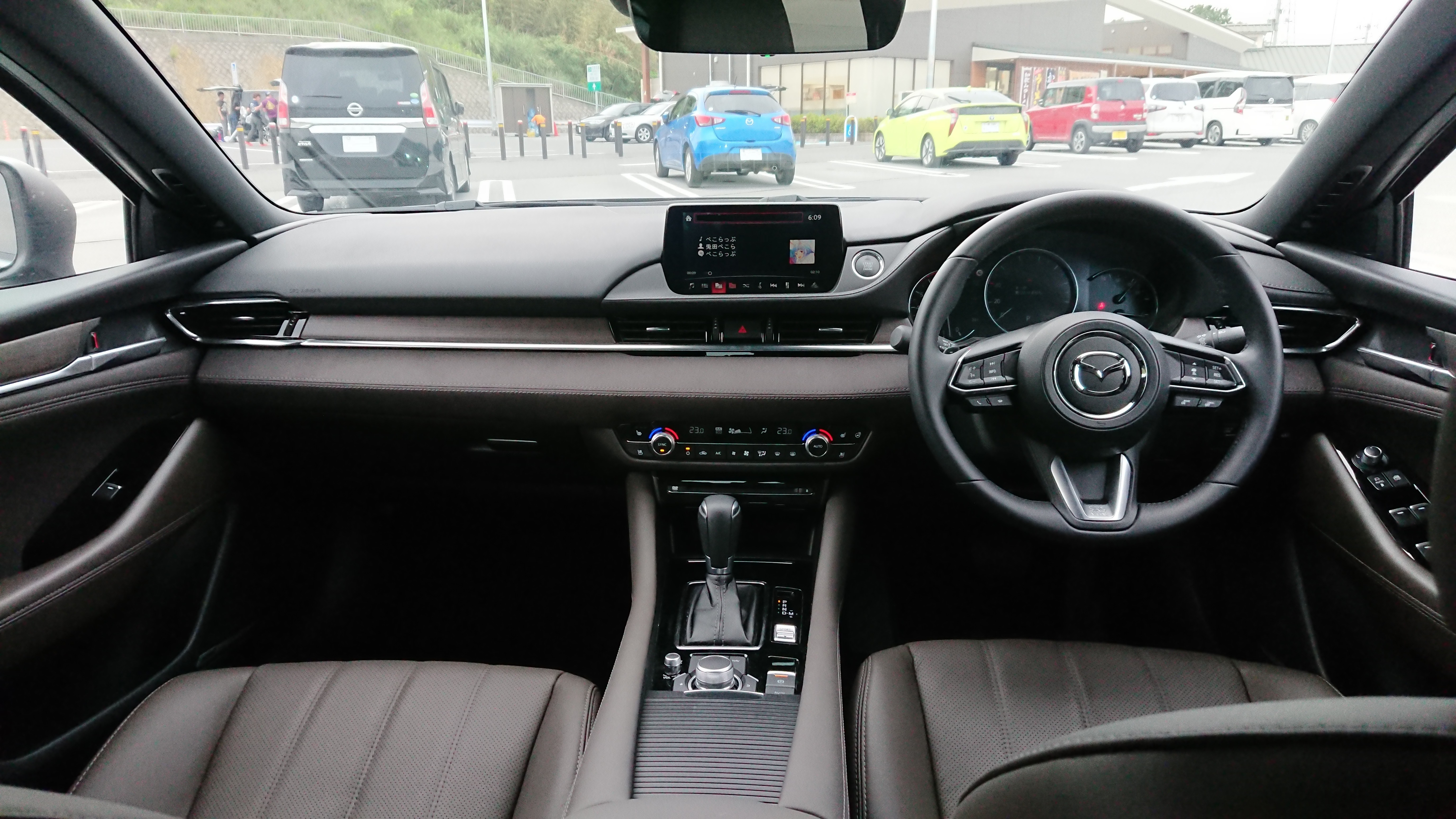
Interior (facelift)

== Awards ==
The Mazda6 was second place in the 2003 European Car of the Year awards and made Car and Driver magazine's Ten Best list for 2003. The Sport Wagon won the Canadian Car of the Year Best New Station Wagon award, while the Sport sedan won the Canadian Car of the Year Best New Family Car award for 2005. The 6 Estate also won What Car?'s Best Estate award in 2004. Also the Mazda6 won the 2003 Semperit Irish Car of the Year.

The Mazda6 won the 'Best Mid-size Car (over $28,000)' title in Australia's Best Cars in 2002 and 2003. It came second in 2004, behind the Subaru Liberty, and fifth in 2005 (the Honda Accord Euro was first in 2005). Wheels magazine also awarded the Mazda6 winner of its Active Safety Program in July 2005. In December 2007 the Mazda6 won the Carsales Peoples Choice award for its class in Australia.

The Mazda6 also won "Best Family Sedan" in MotorWeek's 2009 Driver's Choice Awards.

The Mazda6 was praised for its edgy handsome design, communicative steering, and tight suspension. However, as it was designed as a world car in order to fit the needs of Europe and Japan, it was smaller than its North American contemporaries in the midsize segment, being criticized for its reduced passenger space. Its acceleration, particularly the V6 engine models, lagged behind that of its rivals as well.

The hatchback's liftback/notchback styling was considered a clever design to disguise it as a four-door saloon, as North Americans generally considered trunks more elegant than hatches. The estate had an early demise, but the hatchback was somewhat successful in Canada, especially in Québec, though it would not have a 2009 refresh, as both models were unpopular in the US.

== Motorsport ==
For the 2013 Rolex Sports Car Series the Mazda6 was involved in the short lived Grand-Am GX series. Three cars were used, one racing under the number #70, being driven by Jonathan Bomarito, Marino Franchitti, Tom Long, Sylvain Tremblay, and James Hinchcliff, a VisitFlorida.com sponsored car using the number #00, driven by Tristan Nunez, Spencer Pigot, and Tristan Vautier, and Yojiro Terada, and the third car was driven under the #25, being driven by Andrew Carbonell, Tom Long, Rhett O’Doski, and Derek Whitis. The car was successful, albeit in a class with few other cars. The class they were driven in was the GX class, intended for cars using alternative fuels or alternative technologies. The class folded after one year, and was not carried onto the 2014 United SportsCar Championship.

== Sales ==
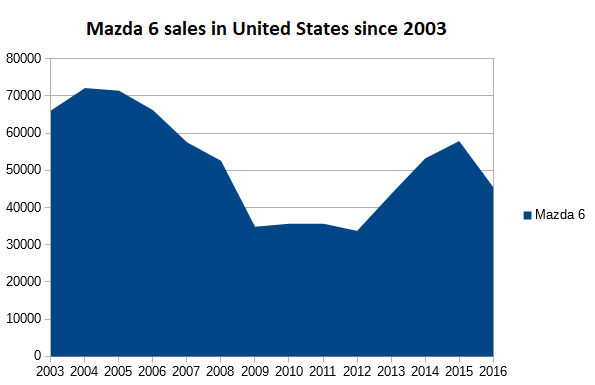
Mazda6 sales in the U.S. by year

Year	Japan	U.S.	Canada	Mexico	Europe	Australia	China	Saudi Arabia	Vietnam
2003		66,118			91,948	12,709			
2004		72,148			89,389	12,075			
2005		71,447		141	71,893	14,783			
2006		66,203		1,003	74,462	12,826			
2007		57,575		980	64,009	12,397			
2008	15,848	52,590		2,241	65,208	10,207			
2009	7,398	34,866	6,614	2,193	46,876	8,758			
2010	7,105	35,662	6,092	3,216	38,702	7,455			
2011	4,588	35,711	3,676	2,170	28,204	5,794			
2012	5,207	33,756	5,128	2,363	19,343	6,558			
2013	22,388	43,638	4,224	4,162	32,538	7,701			
2014	11,387	53,224	3,023	3,776	31,032	5,883	27,710		1,024
2015	12,360	57,898	2,703	3,627	30,519	5,276	42,000		2,589
2016	9,407	45,520	2,053	2,627	29,226	4,369	34,246		3,248
2017	6,394	33,402	2,541	1,721	23,090	3,647	53,493		2,044
2018	7,782	30,938	2,292	1,429	20,873	3,328	47,060		2,377
2019	5,350	21,524	1,402	1,061	22,048	2,612	41,950	16,773	1,675
2020	2,933	16,204	1,049	636	6,950	1,727	30,978	13,269	1,653
2021	2,350	16,214	1,411	475	4,890	1,491	19,502	12,042	1,122
2022	2,043	335	0	0	4,483	1,511			1,289
2023		1,690				1,528	4,288		1,094
2024							19		
2025							0		

== Notes ==
1.European markets only.
