= 2012 Australian Manufacturers' Championship =

Australian motor racing competition

The 2012 Australian Manufacturers' Championship was a CAMS sanctioned Australian motor racing championship for modified production touring cars. The Manufacturers Championship was determined by a series pointscore for the manufacturers of the competing vehicles although the manufacturers themselves did not directly compete. The series also incorporated the 2012 Australian Production Car Championship, the 2012 Australian Production Car Endurance Championship and the 2012 Australian Endurance Championship, each of which was a drivers' title.

The 2012 Australian Manufacturers' Championship was the 27th manufacturers title to be awarded by CAMS and the 18th to be contested under the Australian Manufacturers' Championship name.

== Class structure ==
Cars competing in the following seven classes:

- Class A : Extreme Performance
- Class B : High Performance
- Class C : Performance Touring
- Class D : Production Touring
- Class E : Compact Touring
- Class F : Hybrid/Alternative Energy
- Class I : Invitational (former Mini Challenge cars – not eligible for championship points)

There was little change from the 2011 class structure, although one new class, Class F for Hybrid/Alternative Energy vehicles was included. Despite its name however, the only eligible vehicles were existing diesel powered cars which had been moved from other classes into the new class.

== Calendar ==
The championship was contested over a five-round series.

Rd.	Circuit	Location / state	Event	Date	Format	Winners	
Rd.	Circuit	Location / state	Event	Date	Format	Drivers	Car
Rd 1	Eastern Creek Raceway	Sydney, New South Wales		10–11 March	2 × 1 hour	Stuart Kostera; Ian Tulloch	Mitsubishi Lancer Evolution X
Rd 2	Phillip Island Grand Prix Circuit	Phillip Island, Victoria	Phillip Island 6 Hour	28–29 April	1 x 6 hour	Jim Pollicina; Ryan Simpson	Mitsubishi Lancer Evolution X
Rd 3	Phillip Island Grand Prix Circuit	Phillip Island, Victoria		26–27 May	2 × 1 hour	Garry Holt; Ryan McLeod	Mitsubishi Lancer Evolution X
Rd 4	Queensland Raceway	Ipswich, Queensland	Hydraulink 400	11–12 August	2 x 200 km	Garry Holt; Ryan McLeod	Mitsubishi Lancer Evolution X
Rd 5	Sandown Raceway	Melbourne, Victoria		24–25 November	2 × 1 hour	Stuart Kostera; Ian Tulloch	Mitsubishi Lancer Evolution X

== Points system ==
Each manufacturer could score class points towards the Australian Manufacturers' Championship title from the two highest placed automobiles of its make, in any class (excluding Class I). The title was awarded to the manufacturer that scores the highest total number of class points over all rounds of the championship.

- In rounds with one scheduled race, points were awarded to manufacturers on a 120–90–72–60–54–48–42–36–30–24–18–12–6 basis for the first thirteen places in each class with 3 points for other finishers.
- In rounds with two scheduled races, points were awarded to manufacturers on a 60–45–36–30–27–24–21–18–15–12–9–6–3 basis for the first thirteen places in each class in each race with 2 points for other finishers.

Points towards the Australian Production Car Championship outright title were awarded to drivers based on outright finishing positions attained in each race. Points were awarded using the same two scales as used for the Australian Manufacturers' Championship with the addition of two points for the driver setting the fastest qualifying lap in each class at each round.

Points towards the Australian Production Car Championship class titles were awarded to drivers based on class finishing positions attained in each race. Points were awarded using the same two scales as used for the Australian Manufacturers' Championship with the addition of two points for the driver setting the fastest qualifying lap in each class at each round.

Drivers of Class I Invitational cars were not eligible to score points in any of the championships, and points were allocated in all cases as though Class I cars had not competed in the race.

== Results ==
=== Australian Manufacturers' Championship ===
		**Eastern Creek**		**Phillip Island**	**Phillip Island**		**Queensland Raceway**		**Sandown**		
**Position**	**Manufacturer**	**R1**	**R2**	**6 Hour**	**R1**	**R2**	**R1**	**R2**	**R1**	**R2**	**Total**
1	Mitsubishi	105	105	210	105	105	**105**	105	105	81	1026
2	BMW / Mini	105	105	210	75	90	90	72	72	120	939
3	Mazda	60	60	210	96	96	45	96	30	105	798
4	Honda	96	105	120	36	0	60	60	60	60	597
5	Proton	60	60	0	60	60	36	60	60	60	456
6	Renault	45	30	90	45	60	45	45	45	45	450
7	Toyota	27	27	72	72	36	81	81	0	0	396
8	Holden	0	36	0	0	0	0	0	60	45	141
9	Ford	0	0	0	60	0	36	27	0	0	123
10	Subaru	0	0	72	0	0	30	0	0	0	102

=== Australian Production Car Championship ===
==== Outright ====
Pos.	Driver	No.	Car	Class	Team	ECR		PHI	PHI		QR		SAN		Pen.	Total
1	Stuart Kostera	1	Mitsubishi Lancer Evolution X	A	Team Mitsubishi Ralliart	**1st**	1st	2nd	3rd	4th	3rd	4th	2nd	2nd		434
2	Ian Tulloch	1	Mitsubishi Lancer Evolution X	A	Team Mitsubishi Ralliart	1st	1st	2nd	3rd	4th	3rd	4th	2nd	2nd		432
3	Dylan Thomas	68	Mitsubishi Lancer Evolution IX	A	CXC Racing	3rd	3rd	11th	1st	2nd	2nd	3rd	1st	5th		375
4	Jim Pollicina	7	Mitsubishi Lancer Evolution X	A	Poll Performance	2nd	2nd	1st	7th	6th	Ret	2nd	4th	4th	60	302
5	Garry Holt	20	Mitsubishi Lancer Evolution X	A	Eastern Creek Karts				2nd	1st	**1st**	1st	Ret	3rd		263
6	Ryan McLeod	50; 20	HSV VXR; Mitsubishi Lancer Evolution X	C A	Racer Industries; Eastern Creek Karts			Ret	2nd	1st	1st	1st		3rd		261
7	Dave Thomas	68	Mitsubishi Lancer Evolution IX	A	CXC Racing	3rd	3rd	11th			2nd	3rd				183
8	Grant Sherrin	19	BMW 135i	B	Sherrin Rentals	**4th**	5th	6th			DNS	6th	6th	6th		181
9	Mark Eddy	51	Honda Integra Type R	D	Jenmal Motorsport	**7th**	9th	**7th**	11th	Ret	**8th**	11th	12th	14th		134
10	Jake Camilleri	36	Mazda 3 MPS	C	Grand Prix Mazda	**Ret**	Ret	5th	5th	5th	**Ret**	7th				133
11	Steve Briffa	8	HSV VE GTS	B	Briffa Smash Repairs / Holden Motor Sport	Ret	7th						5th	9th		132
12	Francois Jouy	51	Honda Integra Type R	D	Jenmal Motorsport	7th	9th	7th	11th	Ret	8th	11th	12th	14th		130
13	Steven Williams	21	Honda Integra Type R	D	Disc Brakes Australia	9th	8th									129
14	Beric Lynton	23	BMW 1M	A	Alphera Financial Services						6th	5th	3rd	1st		120
15	Des Wall	38	Mitsubishi Lancer Evolution IX	A	Easts Holiday Parks	5th	6th		4th	3rd						117
16	Adam Dodd	31	Mazda 3 MPS	C	Osborne Motorsport	10th	10th	12th	14th	8th	9th	9th	10th	10th		114
17	Richard Gartner	97	Renault Clio 197	D	Safe-T-Stop	8th	12th	9th	10th	11th	11th	13th	13th	15th		112
18	Ryan Simpson	7	Mitsubishi Lancer Evolution X	A	Poll Performance			1st		6th	Ret	2nd	4th	4th	60	111
19	Peter O'Donnell	28	BMW 335i	B	GWS Personnel	14th	4th	Ret	6th	7th	16th	17th	7th	Ret		105
20	Colin Osborne	31; 13	Mazda 3 MPS	C	Osborne Motorsport	10th	10th	Ret	9th	9th	Ret	12th	8th	8th		102
22	Grant Phillips	77	Proton Satria STi	E	Pedders Racing	**13th**	13th	Ret	15th	14th	17th	15th	15th	16th		96
23	Geoff Brunsdon	75	Toyota Celica VVTL-i	D	Osborne Motorsport	12th	14th	13th	17th	13th	12th	14th				84
24	Matt McGill	75	Toyota Celica VVTL-i	D	Osborne Motorsport	12th	14th	13th	17th	13th	12th	14th				77
25	Trevor Keene	50	Mini Cooper S	D	Mid West Multi Media	Ret	Ret		13th	12th	18th	Ret				72
26	Cameron Wilson	25	Subaru Impreza WRX STi	A	Wilson Brothers Racing			4th			4th	Ret				49
=	David Wood	25	Subaru Impreza WRX STi	A	Wilson Brothers Racing			4th			4th	Ret				49
28	Iain Sherrin	19	BMW 135i	B	Sherrin Rentals			6th			**5th**	DNS				39
=	Chaz Mostert	11	BMW 335i	B	Eastern Creek Karts			**3rd**								39
30	Nathan Morcom	11	BMW 335i	B	Eastern Creek Karts			3rd								36
=	Scott Nicholas	36	Mazda 3 MPS	C	Grand Prix Mazda			**5th**								36
32	Dean Croswell	57	FPV FG GT	I	Michael Benton								11th	7th		32
=	Michael Benton	57	FPV FG GT	I	Michael Benton								11th	7th		32
34	Kean Booker	26	BMW 130i	C	GWS Personnel								9th	11th		26
35	Angus Chapel	26	BMW 130i	B	GWS Personnel						7th	8th				23
36	Andrew Gilbertson	26	BMW 130i	B	GWS Personnel						7th	8th	9th	11th		22
37	Peter Leemhuis	97	Renault Clio 197	D	Safe-T-Stop			9th								21
=	Hadrian Morrall	31	Mazda 3 MPS	C	Osborne Motorsport			12th								21
=	John Bowe	28	BMW 335i	B	GWS Personnel			Ret						Ret		21
40	Dean Lillie	7	Mitsubishi Lancer Evolution X	A	Poll Performance				**7th**							18
=	Declan Kirkham	71	Ford Fiesta	D	Robinson Racing				8th	Ret						18
42	Phil Kirkham	71	Ford Fiesta	D	Robinson Racing				8th	Ret						17
43	Andrew Turpie	77	Proton Satria STi	E	Pedders Racing			Ret	**15th**	14th	17th	15th	15th	16th		15
44	Allan Jarvis	17	Suzuki Swift Sport	E	BVC Racing						**13th**	DNS				8
=	David Giugni	27	BMW 130i	C	Garry Mennell								16th	12th		8
=	Theo Koundouris	27	BMW 130i	C	Garry Mennell								16th	12th		8
47	Maddison Gray	15	Toyota Echo Sportivo	E	Lauren Gray Motorsport				16th	Ret	15th	16th				6
=	Rob Jarvis	17	Suzuki Swift Sport	E	BVC Racing						13th	DNS				6
49	Mark Bell	91	Ford BA Falcon XR8	C	Bell Heavy Haulage						14th	18th				5
=	Graham Lusty	91	Ford BA Falcon XR8	C	Bell Heavy Haulage						14th	18th				5
51	Lauren Gray	15	Toyota Echo Sportivo	E	Lauren Gray Motorsport						15th	16th				4
=	Garth Duffy	28	BMW 335i	B	GWS Personnel						16th	17th				4
53	Klark Quinn	29	Mitsubishi Lancer Evolution X	A	VIP Petfoods Racing			**Ret**			DNS	DNS				2
=	Samantha Bennett	15	Toyota Echo Sportivo	E	Lauren Gray Motorsport				16th	Ret						2
=	Shaun Keogh	50	Mini Cooper S	D	Mid West Multi Media						18th	Ret				2

Colour	Result
Gold	Winner
Silver	Second place
Bronze	Third place
Green	Points classification
Blue	Non-points classification
Blue	Non-classified finish (NC)
Purple	Retired, not classified (Ret)
Red	Did not qualify (DNQ)
Red	Did not pre-qualify (DNPQ)
Black	Disqualified (DSQ)
White	Did not start (DNS)
White	Withdrew (WD)
White	Race cancelled (C)
Blank	Did not practice (DNP)
Blank	Did not arrive (DNA)
Blank	Excluded (EX)

Bold – Pole in class

Note: Drivers of Class I Invitational cars were not eligible to score points in any of the championships and points were allocated in all cases as though Class I cars were not competing in the race.

==== Classes ====
Class winners were:

- Class A – Stuart Kostera (Mitsubishi Lancer Evolution X)
- Class B – Grant Sherrin (BMW 135i)
- Class C – Adam Dodd (Mazda 3 MPS)
- Class D – Mark Eddy (Honda Integra)
- Class E – Grant Phillips (Proton Satria GTi)
- Class I - Michael Sherrin (Mini Cooper S)

=== Australian Endurance Championship ===
The Australian Endurance Championship was awarded to the drivers scoring the most points at Round 2 of the championship.

Whilst Jim Pollicina and Ryan Simpson were the winners of Round 2, a 60-point penalty was applied to the two drivers at that round. The 2012 Australian Endurance Championship was therefore awarded to Stuart Kostera and Ian Tulloch, who placed second at Round 2.

=== Australian Production Car Endurance Championship ===
The Australian Production Car Endurance Championship was awarded to the drivers scoring the most points at Round 2 of the championship.

Whilst Jim Pollicina and Ryan Simpson were the winners of Round 2, a 60-point penalty was applied to the two drivers at that round. The 2012 Australian Production Car Endurance Championship was therefore awarded to Stuart Kostera and Ian Tulloch, who placed second at Round 2.
