= 2012 Phillip Island 6 Hour =

Layout of the Phillip Island Grand Prix Circuit

The 2012 Phillip Island 6 Hour was an endurance race for modified production touring cars, staged at the Phillip Island Grand Prix Circuit in Victoria, Australia on 29 April 2012. The race was Round 2 of the 2012 Australian Manufacturers' Championship, Round 2 of the 2012 Australian Production Car Championship, Round 1 of the 2012 Australian Endurance Championship and Round 1 of the 2012 Australian Production Car Endurance Championship. It was the second annual Phillip Island 6 Hour race to be held at the Victorian circuit.

== Classes ==
Cars competed in the following classes:

- Class A – Extreme Performance
- Class B – High Performance
- Class C – Performance Touring
- Class D – Production Touring
- Class E – Compact Touring
- Class I – MINI Cup

== Results ==
| Position | Drivers | No. | Car | Competitor/Team | Class | Laps | APCC Points |
|---|---|---|---|---|---|---|---|
| 1 | Jim Pollicina; Ryan Simpson | 7 | Mitsubishi Lancer Evo X | Poll Performance / McDonald's | A | 192 | 120 |
| 2 | Stuart Kostera; Ian Tulloch | 1 | Mitsubishi Lancer Evo X | TMR Performance / Tulloch Transport | A | 192 | 90 |
| 3 | Nathan Morcom; Chaz Mostert | 11 | BMW 335i | Barry Morcom | B | 189 | 72 |
| 4 | Cam Wilson; David Wood | 25 | Subaru Impreza WRX STi | WBR Team Subaru | A | 188 | 60 |
| 5 | Jake Camilleri; Scott Nicholas | 36 | Mazda 3 MPS | Grand Prix Mazda | C | 187 | 54 |
| 6 | Grant Sherrin; Iain Sherrin | 19 | BMW 135i | Sherrin Rentals | B | 185 | 48 |
| 7 | Mark Eddy; Francois Jouy | 51 | Honda Integra Type R | Network Clothing / Dentbuster | D | 179 | 42 |
| 8 | Michael Sherrin; David Ayres | 72 | Mini John Cooper Works | Sherrin Rentals | I | 179 | |
| 9 | Richard Gartner; Peter Leemhuis | 97 | Renault Clio | Safe - T - Stop | D | 177 | 36 |
| 10 | Daniel Stutterd; Mike Eady | 32 | Mini John Cooper Works | Carter Grange | I | 175 | |
| 11 | Dylan Thomas; David Thomas | 68 | Mitsubishi Lancer Evo IX | CXC Global | A | 175 | 30 |
| 12 | Adam Dodd; Hadrian Morrall | 31 | Mazda 3 MPS | Osborne Motorsport | C | 165 | 24 |
| 13 | Matthew McGill; Geoff Brunsdon | 75 | Toyota Celica | Crown & Marks | D | 152 | 18 |
| DNF | Ryan McLeod; Leanne Tander | 50 | HSV VXR | Ryan McLeod | C | 185 | |
| DNF | Tony Quinn; Klark Quinn | 29 | Mitsubishi Lancer Evo X | VIP Pet Foods | A | 114 | |
| DNF | Andrew Turpie; Daryl Martin (Grant Phillips) | 77 | Proton Satria GTi | Pedders / Valvoline Racing | E | 86 | |
| DNF | Colin Osborne; Rick Bates | 13 | Mazda 3 MPS | Osborne Motorsport | C | 40 | |
| DNF | Matthew Holt (Brett Howard) (Warren Millett) | 65 | HSV GTS | The Dent Man | B | 17 | |
| DNF | Peter Burnitt (Danny Buzadzic) | 24 | Subaru Impreza WRX STi | WBR Team Subaru | A | 1 | |
| DNS | (Peter O'Donnell) (John Bowe) | 28 | BMW 335i | GWS Personnel | B | 0 | |

Drivers whose names are shown in brackets in the above table did not drive the car during the actual race.
