= Australian Endurance Championship =

Motor racing title in Australia

- Category: Touring car racing Production car racing GT racing
- Country: Australia
- Inaugural season: 1981
- Drivers' champion: Geoff Emery; Garth Tander
- Official website: Australian Endurance Championship

The Australian Endurance Championship is an Australian motor racing title which has been awarded by Motorsports Australia in numerous years and for numerous categories since 1981.

== History ==
=== Touring cars ===
The title was first contested as a championship for car manufacturers. Replacing the Australian Championship of Makes, which had been held from 1976 to 1980, it was decided over a series of endurance races for cars complying with CAMS Group C Touring Car regulations. In the years from 1982 to 1984, the winner of the Australian Endurance Championship was the most successful driver rather than the manufacturer. The Australian Endurance Championship of Makes, run concurrently with the drivers’ title, was the new name for the manufacturers’ award.

For 1985 the manufacturers’ title was again renamed, now becoming the Australian Manufacturers' Championship. The dual Australian Endurance Championship / Australian Manufacturers' Championship titles were contested in both 1985 and 1986 over a series of endurance races for cars complying with Australian Touring Car regulations, which were based on International Group A. No Australian Endurance Championship was awarded in the years from 1987 to 1989, however the Australian Manufacturers' Championship continued, now contested over the same series of sprint races as the Australian Touring Car Championship.

In 1990 CAMS re-instated the Australian Endurance Championship, once again as a drivers’ championship, run over a series of endurance races for Group 3A Touring Cars. The Australian Manufacturers' Championship title was moved back to this series in the same year, however this format was only utilised for two years and the titles were not contested in 1992. From 2013 onwards, an Enduro Cup was awarded to the drivers scoring the most championship points over the three two-driver endurance events in the Supercars Championship.

=== Production cars ===
The CAMS Australian Endurance Championship title was revived in 2011 and contested within the Australian Manufacturers' Championship from that year through to 2015.

The vacant title would be claimed by the Australian Production Car Series for their 2026 season.

=== GT cars ===
From 2016, the CAMS Australian Endurance Championship was contested by Australian GT cars. The inaugural season included four 101 lap races, at Phillip Island Grand Prix Circuit, Sydney Motorsport Park, Hampton Downs Motorsport Park and the Highlands 101 at Highlands Motorsport Park. In 2018, the Australian Endurance Championship was conducted over the three Endurance rounds of the Australian GT Championship, rather than being contested as a separate series.

== Champions ==
The following table lists the winners of the Australian Endurance Championship as awarded by the Confederation of Australian Motor Sport.

Season	Champion	Vehicle
1981	Toyota (Australia)	Toyota Celica
1982	(Canada) Allan Moffat	Mazda RX-7
1983	(Australia) Peter McLeod	Mazda RX-7
1984	(Canada) Allan Moffat	Mazda RX-7
1985	(New Zealand) Jim Richards	BMW 635 CSi
1986	(New Zealand) Jim Richards	BMW 635 CSi
1987 – 1989	Not contested	
1990	(Australia) Glenn Seton	Ford Sierra RS500
1991	(Australia) Mark Gibbs (Australia) Rohan Onslow	Nissan Skyline R32 GT-R
1992 – 2010	Not contested	
2011	(Australia) Stuart Kostera (New Zealand) Ian Tulloch	Mitsubishi Lancer Evo X
2012	(Australia) Stuart Kostera (New Zealand) Ian Tulloch	Mitsubishi Lancer Evo X
2013	Not contested	
2014	(Australia) Grant Sherrin	BMW 135i
2015	(Australia) Grant Sherrin	BMW 135i
2016	(Australia) Grant Denyer (Australia) Nathan Morcom	McLaren 650S GT3
2017	(Australia) Peter Hackett (New Zealand) Dominic Storey	Mercedes-AMG GT3
2018	(Australia) Max Twigg (Australia) Tony D'Alberto	Mercedes-AMG GT3
2019	(Australia) Geoff Emery (Australia) Garth Tander	Audi R8 LMS Evo

=== Multiple winners ===
==== By driver ====
Wins	Driver	Years
2	(Canada) Allan Moffat	1982, 1984
2	(New Zealand) Jim Richards	1985, 1986
2	(Australia) Stuart Kostera	2011, 2012
2	(New Zealand) Ian Tulloch	2011, 2012
2	(Australia) Grant Sherrin	2014, 2015

==== By manufacturer ====
Wins	Manufacturer	Years
4	(Germany) BMW	1985, 1986, 2014, 2015
3	(Japan) Mazda	1982, 1983, 1984
2	(Japan) Mitsubishi	2011, 2012
2	(Germany) Mercedes-Benz	2017, 2018

== Australian Production Car Endurance Championship ==
CAMS also awarded an Australian Production Car Endurance Championship in 2011 and 2012. It was contested with the Australian Manufacturers' Championship in both years.

=== Champions ===
The following table lists the winners of the Australian Production Car Endurance Championship as awarded by the Confederation of Australian Motor Sport.

Year	Champion	Car
2011	Stuart Kostera; Ian Tulloch	Mitsubishi Lancer Evo X
2012	Stuart Kostera; Ian Tulloch	Mitsubishi Lancer Evo X

== AASA claim ==
The Australian Autosport Alliance (AASA) has previously run a competition it dubbed the Australian Endurance Championship.

An alternate sanctioning body to CAMS, which ran the Australian Endurance Championship from 1981 to present, the AASA competition is not considered official or legitimate, and is not a recognised competition by the Australian Office of Sport.

The AASA competition centered on placing a title across the otherwise disconnected events, which in 2013 saw its title \awarded to highest point-scorer in the Wakefield 300 and Winton 300 endurance events.

In 2014, it also included the Willowbank 300 at Queensland Raceway. This 3 event series was won by Justin Ruggier and Mark Mackay.

== See also ==
- Australian Manufacturers' Championship
- Enduro Cup
