= 2015 Australian Manufacturers' Championship =

Australian touring competition

The 2015 Australian Manufacturers' Championship was an Australian motor racing series for modified production touring cars. It comprised three CAMS sanctioned national championship titles:

- The Australian Manufacturers' Championship for automobile manufacturers
- The Australian Production Car Championship for drivers
- The Australian Endurance Championship for drivers

Australian Manufacturers Championship Pty Ltd was appointed by CAMS as the Category Manager for the championship.

The Australian Manufacturers' Championship was awarded to BMW Australia Pty Ltd, the Australian Production Car Championship was won by Grant Sherrin driving a BMW 135i and the Australian Endurance Championship was also won by Grant Sherrin.

== Class structure ==
Cars were classified into the following six classes:

- Class A : Extreme Performance
- Class B : High Performance
- Class C : Performance
- Class D : Production
- Class E : Compact
- Class I : Invitational

== Calendar ==
The championship was contested over five rounds.

| Round | Name | Circuit | Date | Format | Winning drivers | Car |
| 1 | Sandown 3 Hour Classic | Sandown Raceway | 27–29 March | 1 x 3 hour | Shane Marshall, Robert Marshall | Mitsubishi Lancer Evo 10 |
| 2 | Great Southern 4 Hour | Phillip Island | 22–24 May | 1 x 4 hour | Rick Bates, Aaron Seton | Mitsubishi Lancer Evo 10 |
| 3 | | Queensland Raceway | 7–9 August | 2 x 200 km | Beric Lynton | BMW 1M |
| 4 | | Wakefield Park | 16–18 October | 2 x 200 km | Rick Bates | Mitsubishi Lancer Evo 10 |
| 5 | Australian 4 Hour | Sydney Motorsport Park | 13–15 November | 1 x 4 hour | Dylan Thomas, Stuart Kostera | Mitsubishi Lancer Evo 10 |

The results for each round of the Championship were determined by the number of points scored by each driver at that round.

== Points system ==
In rounds with one scheduled race, points were awarded on a 120–90–72–60–54–48–42–36–30–24–18–12–6 basis for the first thirteen places in each class with 3 points for other finishers.

In rounds with two scheduled races, points were awarded on a 60–45–36–30–27–24–21–18–15–12–9–6–3 basis for the first thirteen places in each class in each race with 2 points for other finishers.

Each manufacturer was able to score points towards the Australian Manufacturers' Championship title from the two highest placed automobiles of its make, in any class, excluding Class I. The title was awarded to the manufacturer scoring the highest total number of class points over all rounds of the championship.

Points towards the Australian Production Car Championship outright title were awarded to drivers based on outright finishing positions attained in each race. In addition two points were awarded to the driver setting the fastest qualifying lap in each class at each round.

Points towards the Australian Production Car Championship class titles were awarded to drivers based on class finishing positions attained in each race. In addition two points were awarded to the driver setting the fastest qualifying lap in each class at each round.

Points towards the Australian Endurance Championship outright title were awarded to drivers based on outright finishing positions attained in Rounds 1, 2 and 5. In addition two points were awarded to the driver setting the fastest qualifying lap in each class at each of these rounds.

Points towards the Australian Endurance Championship class titles were awarded to drivers based on class finishing positions attained in Rounds 1, 2 and 5. In addition two points were awarded to the driver setting the fastest qualifying lap in each class at each of these rounds.

== Results ==
=== Australian Manufacturers' Championship ===
The Australian Manufacturers' Championship was awarded to BMW Australia Pty Ltd.

=== Australian Production Car Championship ===
| Position | Driver | No. | Vehicle | Competitor / Team | Points |
| | Outright | | | | |
| 1 | Grant Sherrin | 18 | BMW 135i | Sherrin Rentals | 368 |
| 2 | Iain Sherrin | 18 | BMW 135i | Sherrin Rentals | 362 |
| 3 | Beric Lynton | 23 | BMW 1M | Alphera Financial Services | 282 |
| 4 | RIck Bates | 33 | Mitsubishi Lancer Evo 10 | Castrol / Turbosmart / DBA | 282 |
| 5 | Tony Alford | 54 | BMW 1M | Donut King | 243 |
| 6 | Mark Eddy | 88 & 2 | Renault Megane RS265 & Audi TT RS | Network Clothing | 216 |
| | Class A | | | | |
| 1 | Tony Alford | 54 | BMW 1M | Donut King | 318 |
| 2 | Beric Lynton | 23 | BMW 1M | Alphera Financial Services | 300 |
| 3 | Rick Bates | 33 | Mitsubishi Lancer Evo 10 | Castrol / Turbosmart / DBA | 291 |
| 4 | Shane Marshall | 22 | Mitsubishi Lancer Evo 10 | Melbourne Performance Centre | 210 |
| 5 | Robert Marshall | 22 | Mitsubishi Lancer Evo 10 | Melbourne Performance Centre | 210 |
| | Class B | | | | |
| 1 | Grant Sherrin | 18 | BMW 135i | Sherrin Rentals | 578 |
| 2 | Iain Sherrin | 18 | BMW 135i | Sherrin Rentals | 572 |
| 3 | Michael Sherrin | 19 | BMW 135i | Sherrin Rentals | 333 |
| 4 | David Ayers | 19 | BMW 135i | Sherrin Rentals | 333 |
| 5 | William Gauchi | 28 | BMW 335i | GWS Personnel | 315 |
| | Class C | | | | |
| 1 | Jake Camilleri | 36 | Mazda 3 MPS | Grand Prix Mazda | 364 |
| 2 | Colin Osborne | 13 | Renault Megane RS265 | Osborne Motorsport | 302 |
| 3 | Scott Nicholas | 36 | Mazda 3 MPS | Grand Prix Mazda | 240 |
| 4 | Francious Jouy | 88 | Renault Megane RS265 | Network Clothing | ? |
| 5 | Michael Sloss | 35 | Mazda RX-8 | Ric Shaw Racing/Syntec | 168 |
| | Class D | | | | |
| 1 | Andrew Turpie | 86 | Toyota 86 GTS | Pedders Racing | 488 |
| 2 | Grant Phillips | 86 | Toyota 86 GTS | Pedders Racing | 482 |
| | Class E | | | | |
| | No points scored | | | | |
| | Class I | | | | |
| | No points scored | | | | |

=== Australian Endurance Championship ===
The Australian Endurance Championship was contested at Rounds 1, 2 & 5.

| Position | Driver | No. | Vehicle | Competitor / Team |
| | Outright | | | |
| 1 | Grant Sherrin | 18 | BMW 135i | Sherrin Rentals |
| | Class A | | | |
| 1 | Tony Alford | 54 | BMW 1M | Donut King |
| | Class B | | | |
| 1 | Grant Sherrin | 18 | BMW 135i | Sherrin Rentals |
| | Class C | | | |
| 1 | Francious Jouy | 88 | Renault Megane RS265 | Network Clothing |
| | Class D | | | |
| 1 | Andrew Turpie | 86 | Toyota 86 GTS | Pedders Racing |

== Teams Trophy ==
The Teams Trophy was awarded to the driver pairing that scored the highest total number of class points over all rounds. It was won by Grant Sherrin and Iain Sherrin.
