= Toyota Yaris =

Japanese subcompact car

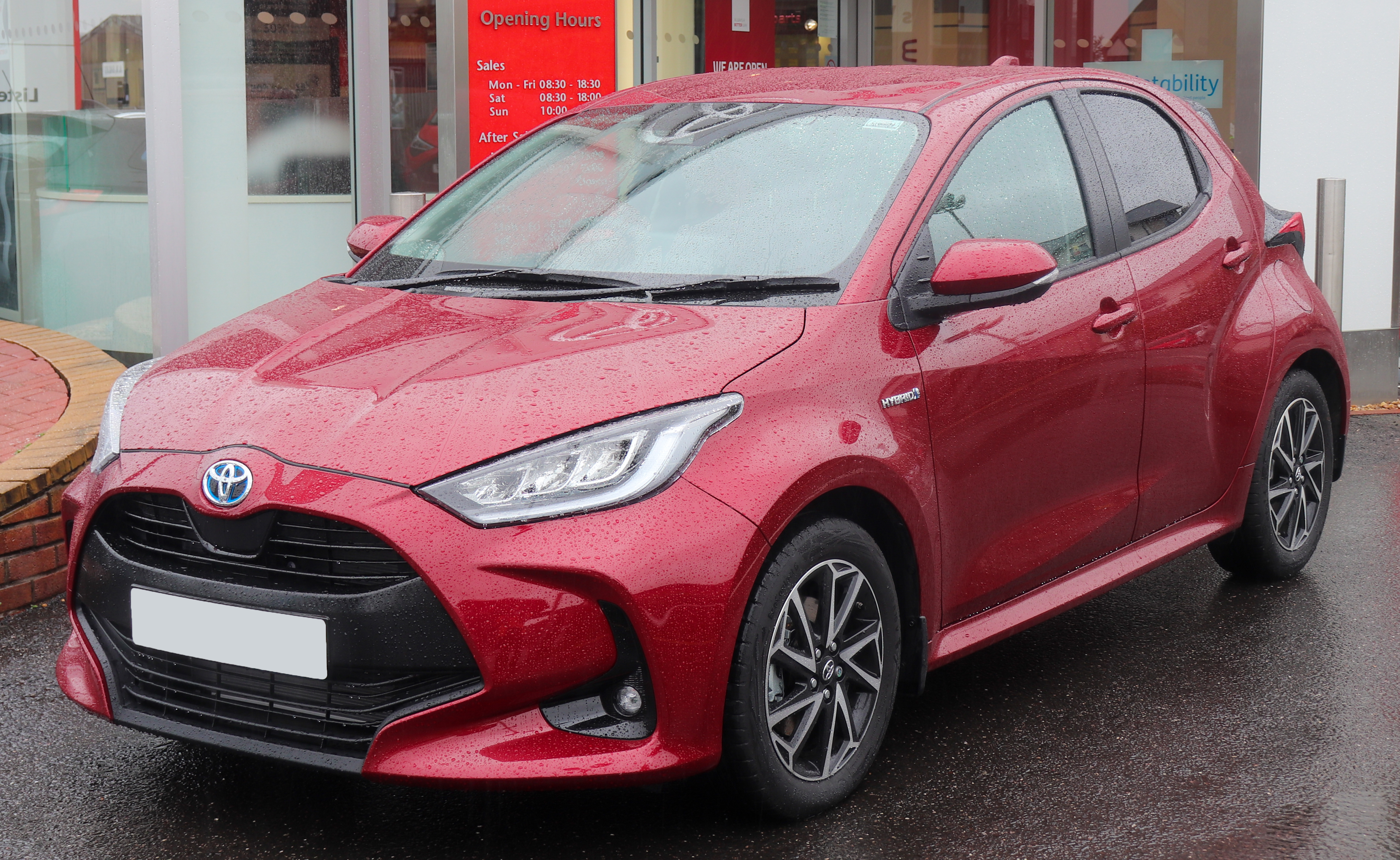
- 2020 Toyota Yaris Design Hybrid (MXPH11, UK)

Overview
- Manufacturer: Toyota
- Also called: Toyota Vitz (Japan, 1999–2019); Toyota Platz (Japan, 1999–2005); Toyota Echo (Australia and North America, 1999–2005); Toyota Belta (Japan, 2005–2012); Toyota Vios (Asia, 2007–present); Daihatsu Charade (Europe, 2011–2013); Scion iA (United States, 2015–2016); Mazda2 Hybrid (Europe, 2022–present)
- Production: January 1999 – present

Body and chassis
- Class: Supermini; Subcompact car (B-segment)
- Body style: 3/5-door hatchback (1999–present); 4-door sedan (1999–present); 2-door coupe (1999–2005, as Echo)

Chronology
- Predecessor: Toyota Starlet; Toyota Tercel

The Toyota Yaris (Japanese: トヨタ・ヤリス, Hepburn: Toyota Yarisu) is a supermini/subcompact car sold by Toyota since 1999, replacing the Starlet and Tercel.

Up to 2019, Toyota had used the Yaris nameplate on export versions of various Japanese-market models, with some markets receiving the same vehicles under the Toyota Echo name through 2005. Starting in 2020, the Yaris nameplate began to be used in Japan, which replaced the Vitz nameplate.

The Yaris nameplate has also been applied to other vehicles. From 1999 to 2005, it had been used for the Yaris Verso mini MPV sold in Europe, where it was known in Japan as the FunCargo. Since 2020, the nameplate has also been used for the subcompact crossover SUV offering called Yaris Cross. In North America, most Yaris sedan models sold from 2015 to 2020 and Yaris hatchbacks sold from 2019 until 2020 were restyled versions of the Mazda 2, produced and developed by Mazda.

In 2020, Toyota introduced the GR Yaris, which is a three-door, performance-oriented variant of the XP210 series Yaris using the Gazoo Racing branding. It is built as a homologation model for the FIA World Rally Championship.

The name "Yaris" is derived from "Charis", the singular form of Charites, the Greek goddesses of charm and beauty. As of March 2020, the Yaris has sold 8.71 million units worldwide.

== Timeline ==
Timeline of Toyota Yaris, 1999–present

== First generation (XP10/XP20; 1999) ==
The first-generation models were marketed between 1999 and 2005 under the "Yaris" and "Echo" names depending on the market. Hatchback and sedan body variants were offered. The hatchback version was developed with the European market as the main target, designed by Toyota’s ED2 facility in France. Exterior panels common between the hatchback and sedan versions are limited to the front doors.

- Hatchback: versions derive from the Japanese market Toyota Vitz (XP10).
- Sedan: versions derive from the Japanese market Toyota Platz (XP10).
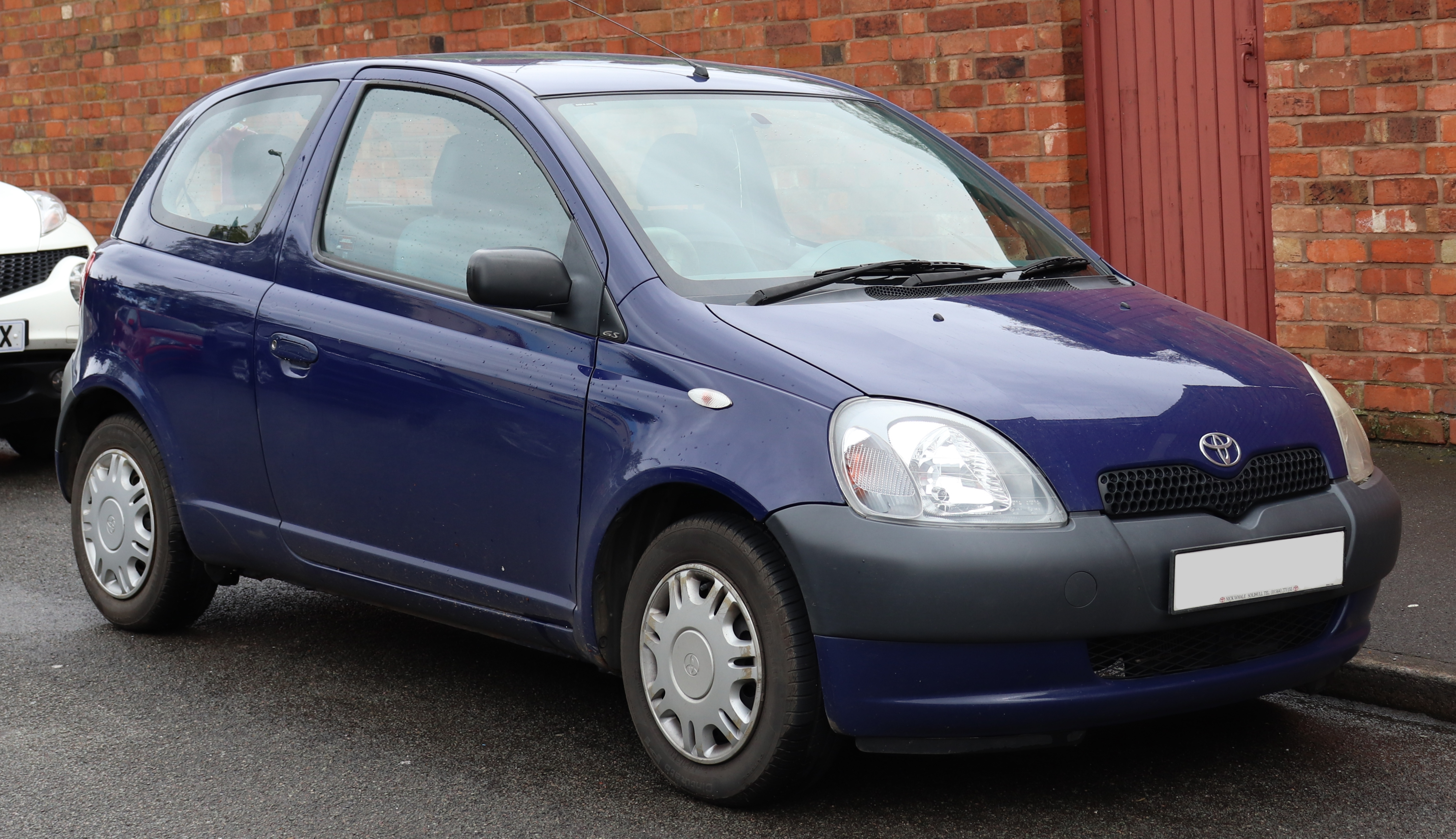
3/5-door hatchback

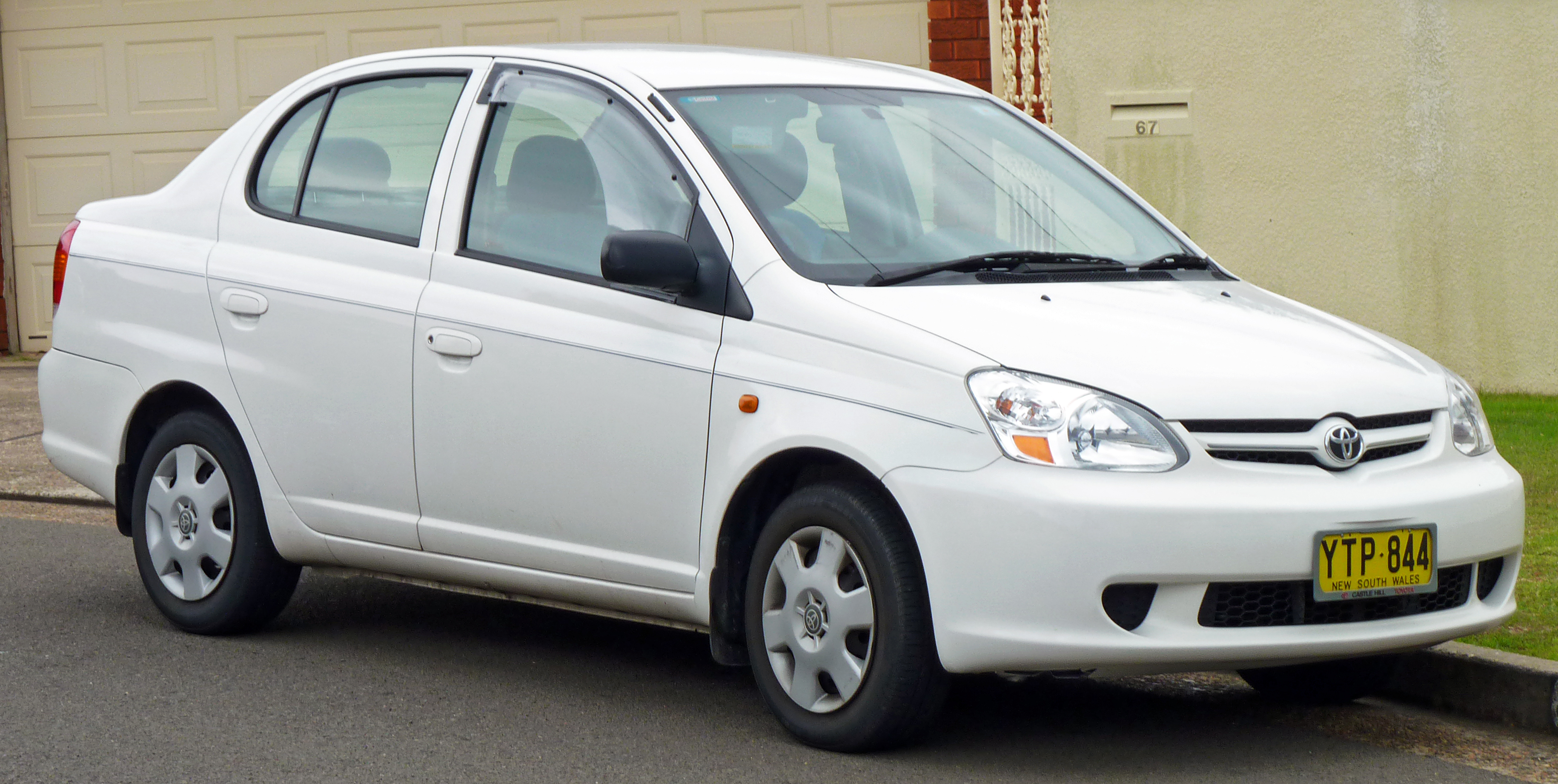
2/4-door sedan

== Second generation (XP90; 2005) ==
The second-generation models were marketed between 2005 and 2013 under the "Yaris" name worldwide. Hatchback and sedan body styles were offered. The hatchback version was discontinued in late 2013 for Asian markets.

- Hatchback: versions derive from the Japanese market Toyota Vitz (XP90).
- Sedan: versions derive from the Japanese market Toyota Belta (XP90).
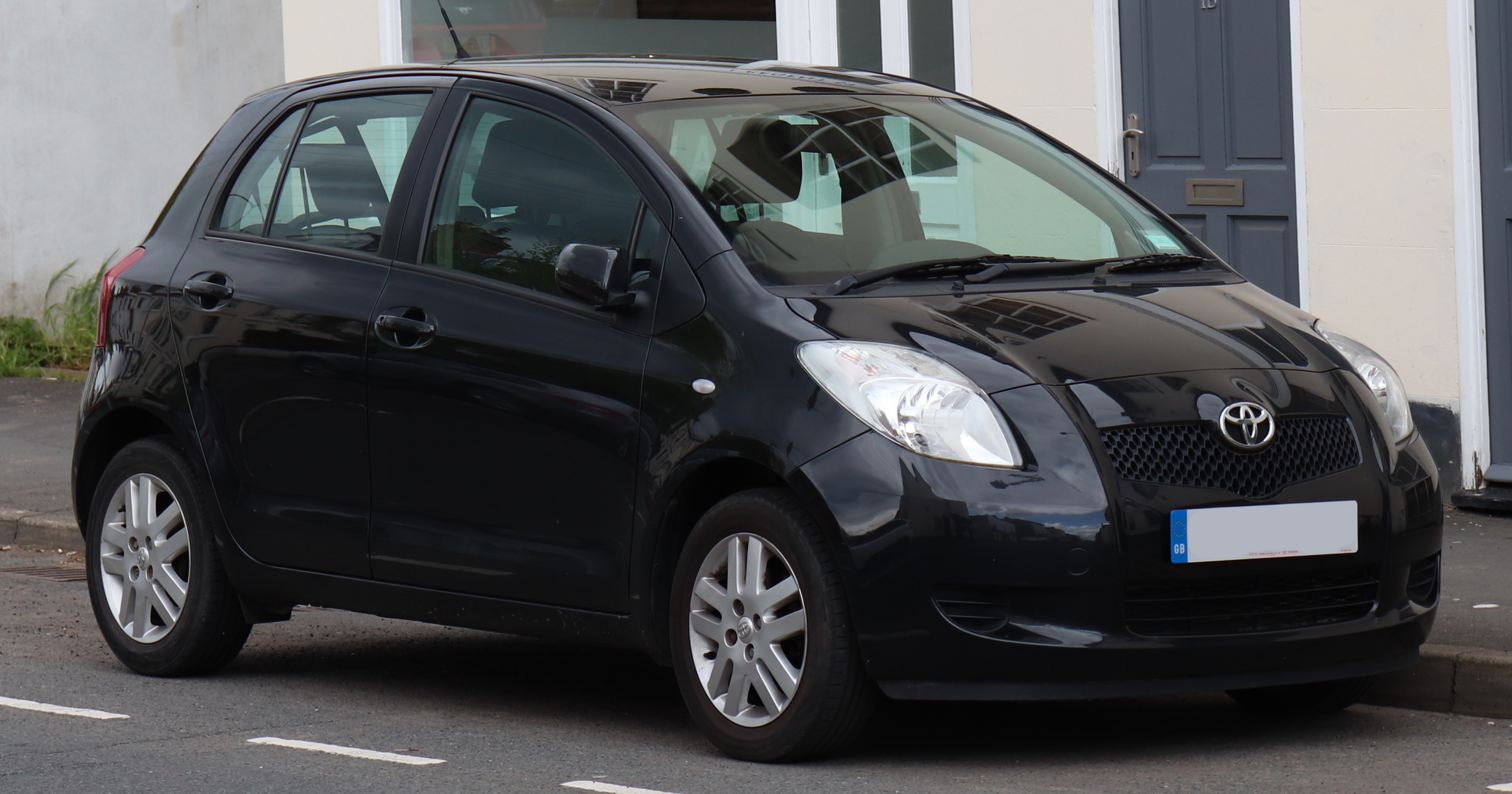
Hatchback

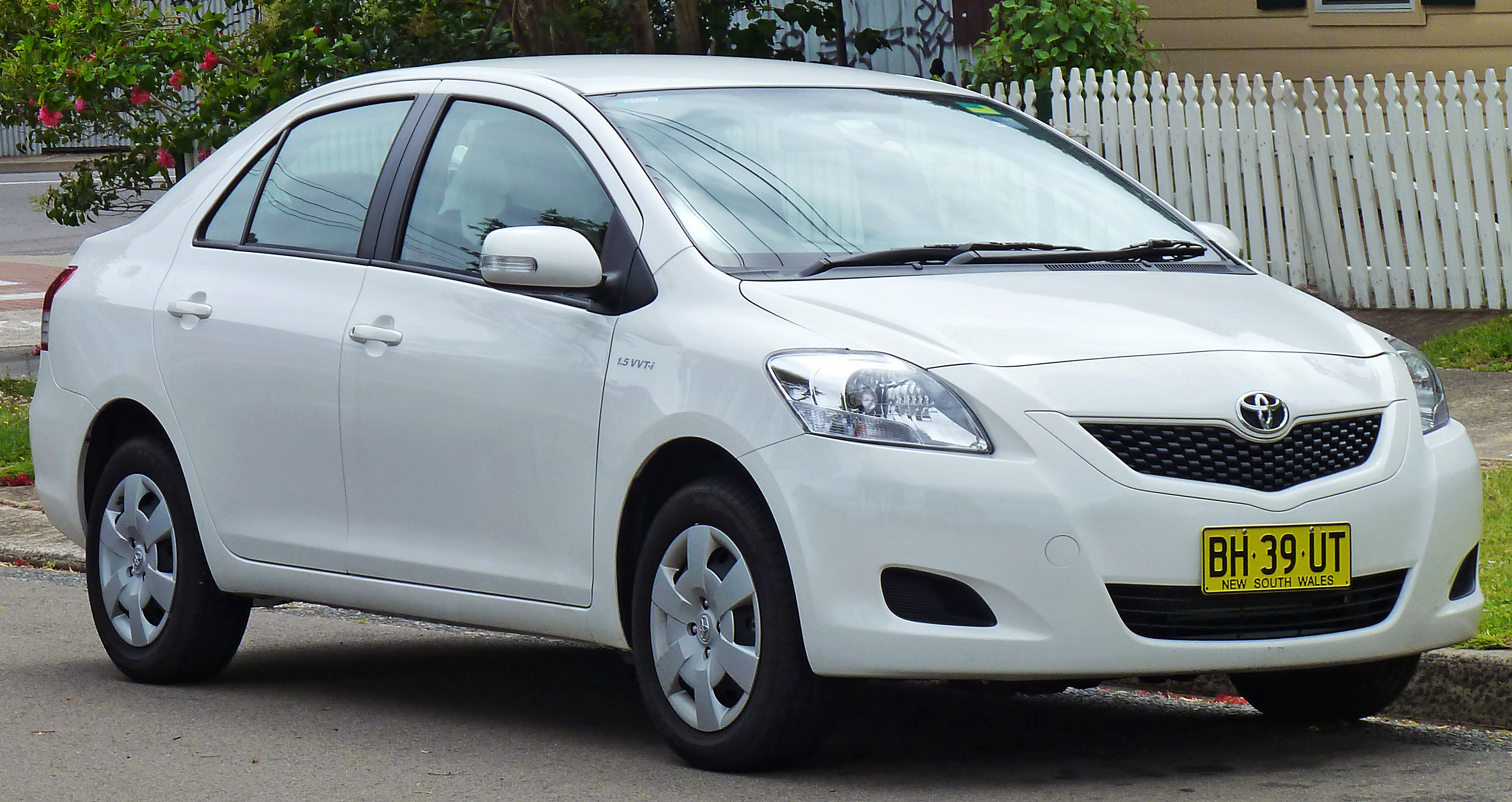
Sedan

== Third generation (XP130, 2011; XP150, 2013) ==
The third-generation models have been marketed since 2011 under the "Yaris" name worldwide. Originally available only as a hatchback, a sedan body style arrived in 2013, but it has not been offered in all countries; notably, the United States and Canada have received only restyled Mazda2 sedans, which have also been sold side-by-side with Toyota-produced sedans in Latin American and Caribbean markets.

- Hatchback: European, Australasian, South African and most North American versions derive from the Japanese market Toyota Vitz (XP130), introduced in early 2011. Most Asian versions from 2013, some Latin American and Caribbean models from 2014 and mostly from early 2018, and South African models from early 2018 derive from the Asian market Toyota Yaris (XP150).
- Sedan: Most Asian versions, Latin American and Caribbean models derive from the Asian market Toyota Vios (XP150), introduced in 2013. Some Asian versions from 2017 and most Latin American and Caribbean models from early 2018 derive from the Toyota Yaris (XP150).
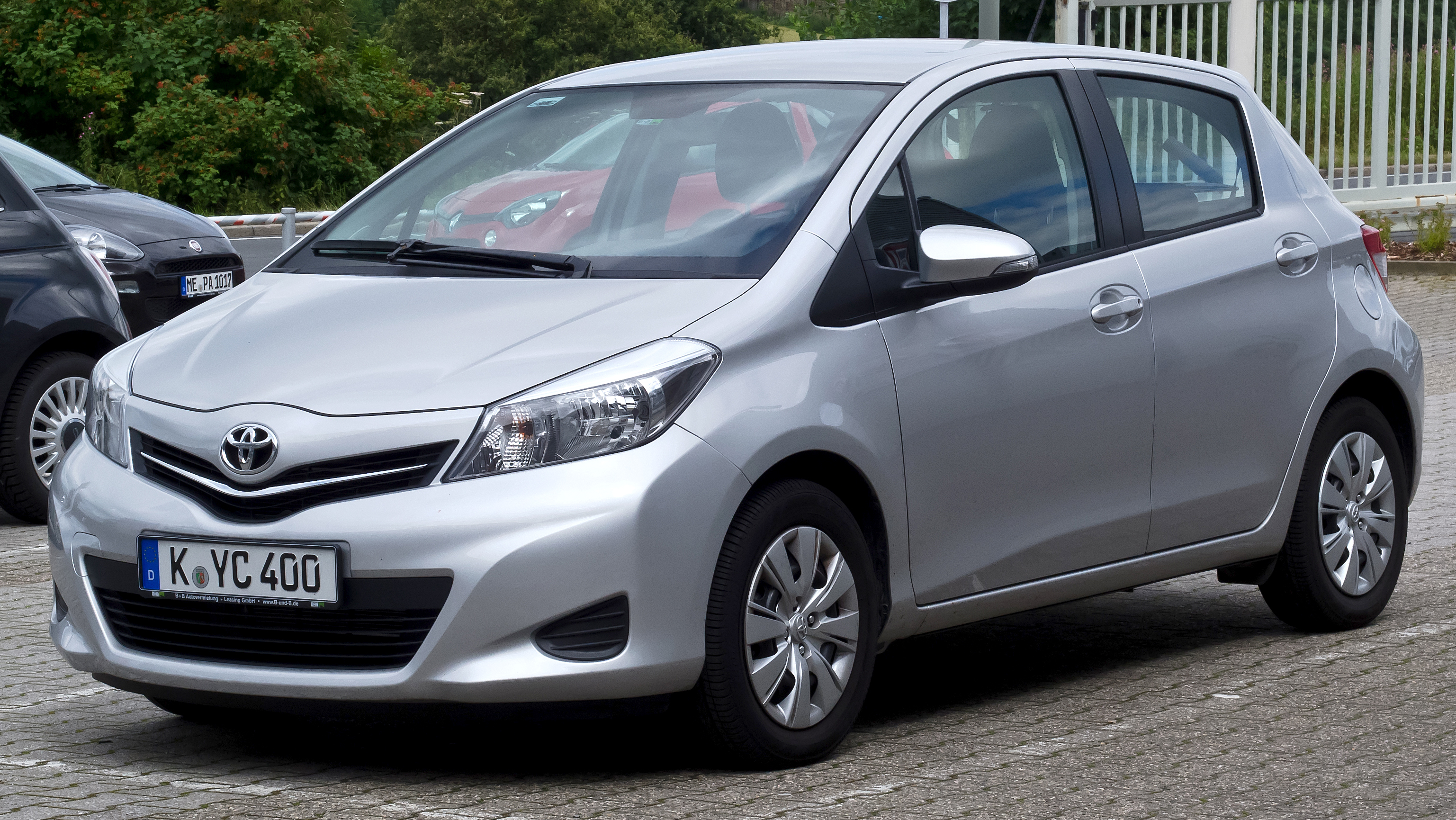
Hatchback: Japan until 2020; Europe, Canada and Australasia until 2019; South Africa and the United States until 2018; most Latin American and Caribbean markets until 2014.

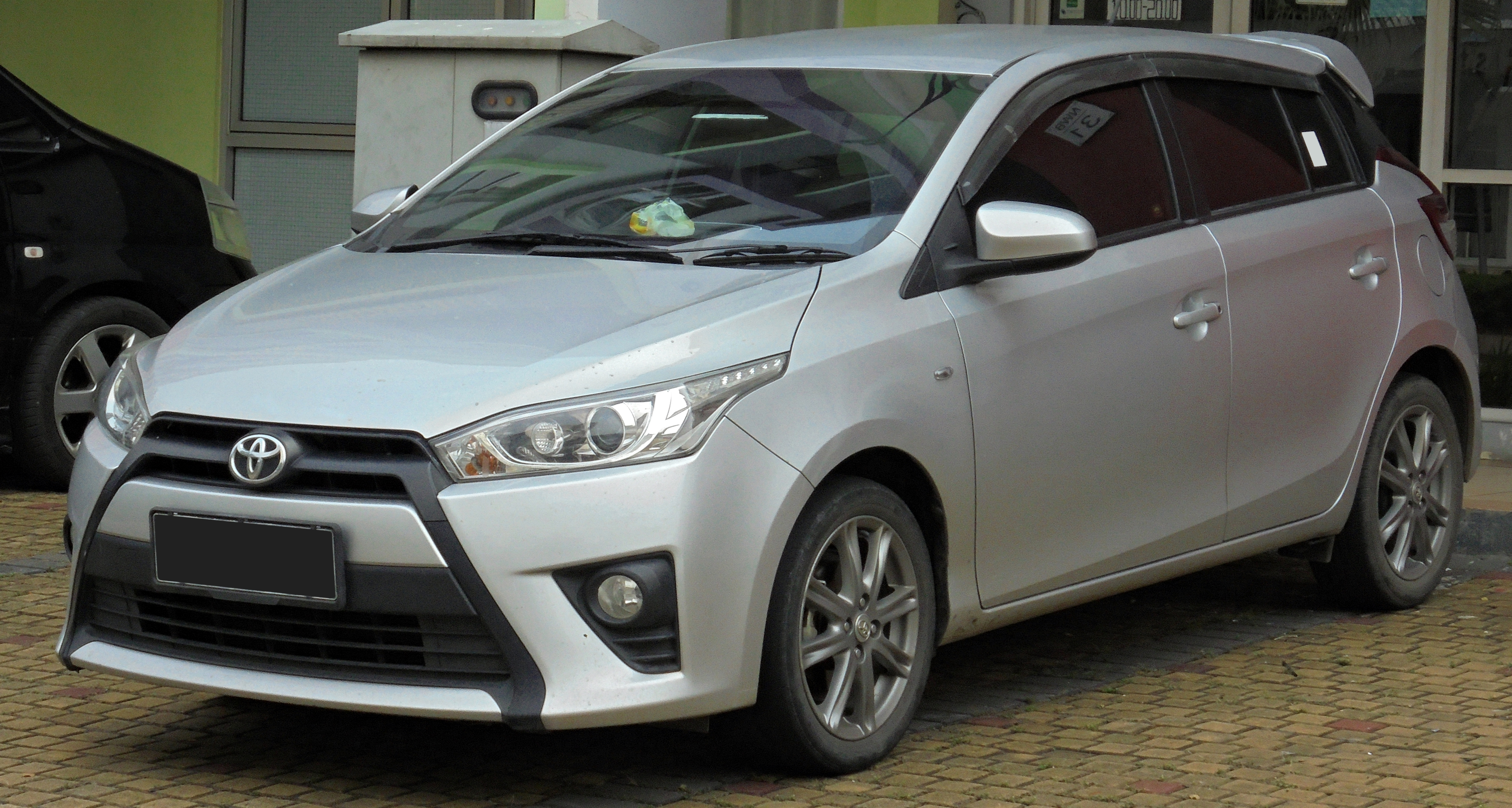
Hatchback: most Asian markets from 2013; some Latin American and Caribbean markets from 2014; South Africa from 2018 until 2021.

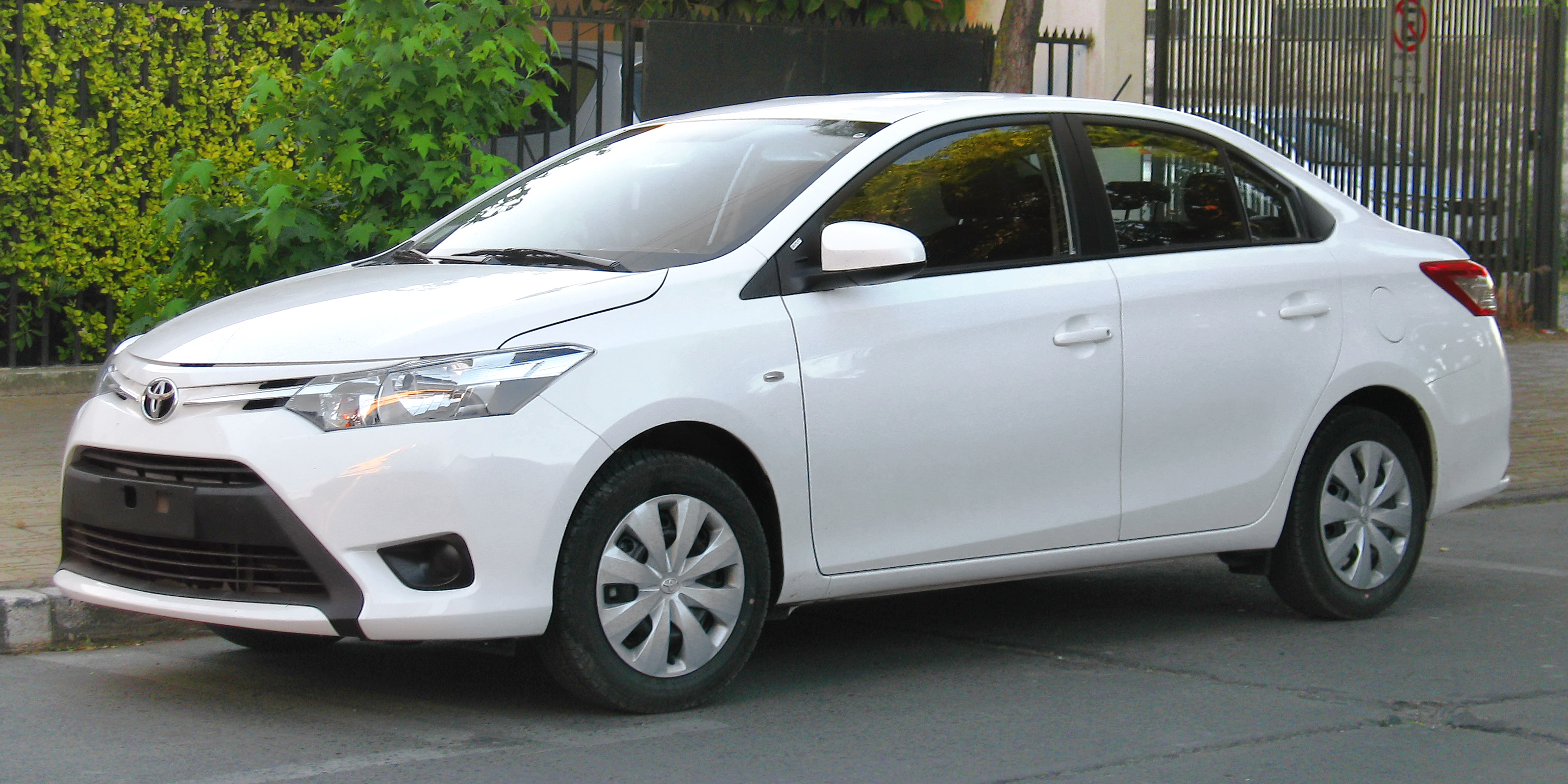
Sedan: most Asian, Latin American and Caribbean markets from 2013.

=== United States and Canada ===
Starting with 2012 models introduced in late 2011, only the XP130 Yaris Liftback was sold in the United States, and the XP150 sedan model was not offered. Toyota simultaneously dropped the Yaris sedan in Canada due to lackluster sales of the XP90 sedan.

Production of all United States and Canadian XP130 Yaris models shifted from Japan to Toyota Motor Manufacturing France starting in May 2013.

The 2019 model year XP130 Yaris Liftback was never introduced in the United States; Toyota continued sales of the 2018 model into January 2019 when it was discontinued. Sales of the Canadian 2019 model continued into 2020 when it was replaced by the Mazda2-based Yaris.

=== Latin America, the Caribbean and Mexico ===
The XP150 series Vios was introduced in Latin America and the Caribbean in 2013 as the Yaris Sedan. In early 2018, a version of the Thai-market Yaris ATIV replaced the XP150 model in these markets, being marketed under the Yaris Sedan name. In Mexico, it was sold alongside the more expensive Mazda2-based Yaris R until 2020.

== Fourth generation (XP210, 2020; AC100, 2022) ==
The fourth-generation Yaris, available initially only as a hatchback, was unveiled simultaneously on 16 October 2019 in Japan and Amsterdam, Netherlands. Built on the GA-B platform, its development was led by chief engineer Yasunori Suezawa and chief hybrid engineer Takashi Uehara. It went on sale in Japan on 10 February 2020, while the petrol 4WD variant went on sale in April 2020.

A performance-oriented version developed by Toyota Gazoo Racing, called the GR Yaris, was first unveiled at the 2020 Tokyo Auto Salon and production began in September 2020.

The XP210 Yaris Hybrid-based Mazda2 Hybrid went on sale in Europe in 2022.

The North American market did not receive the fourth-generation Yaris. Additionally, the nameplate (which had been used for a restyled Mazda2) was eliminated in 2020.

The sedan version was introduced in August 2022, debuting in Thailand as the Yaris Ativ to replace the previous XP150 model. Designated AC100, the model was developed by Daihatsu using the company's DNGA-B platform.

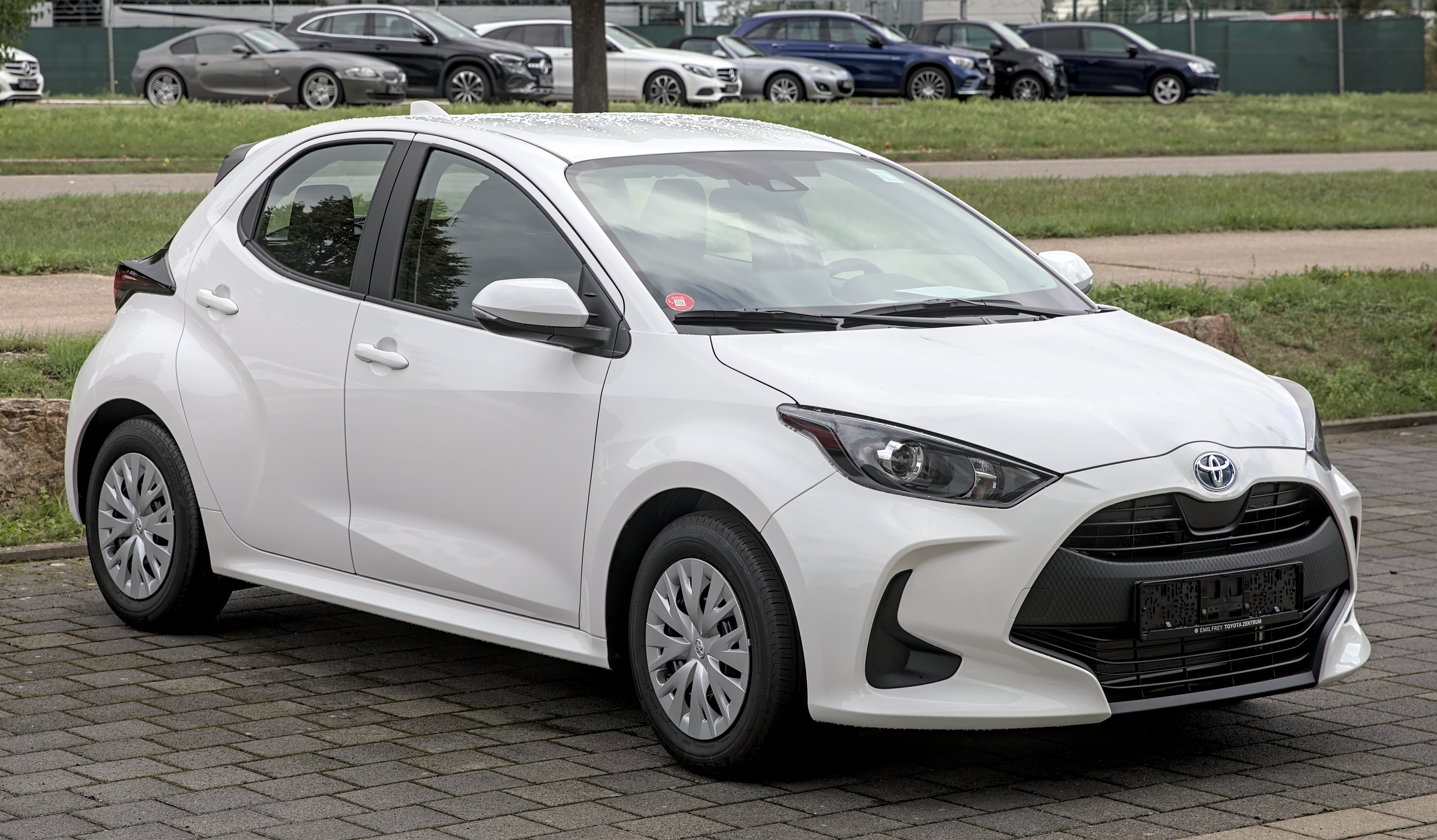
Hatchback

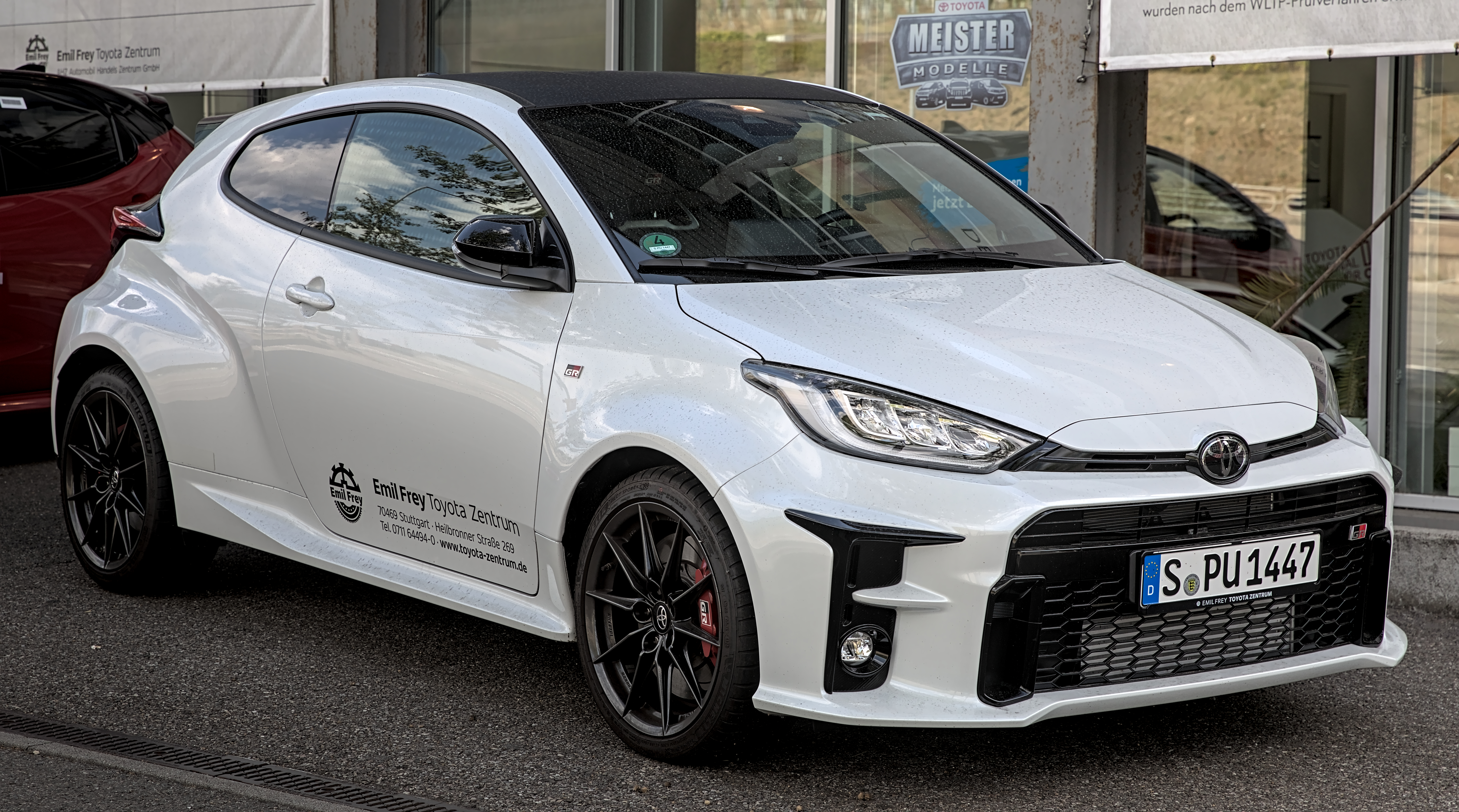
GR Yaris

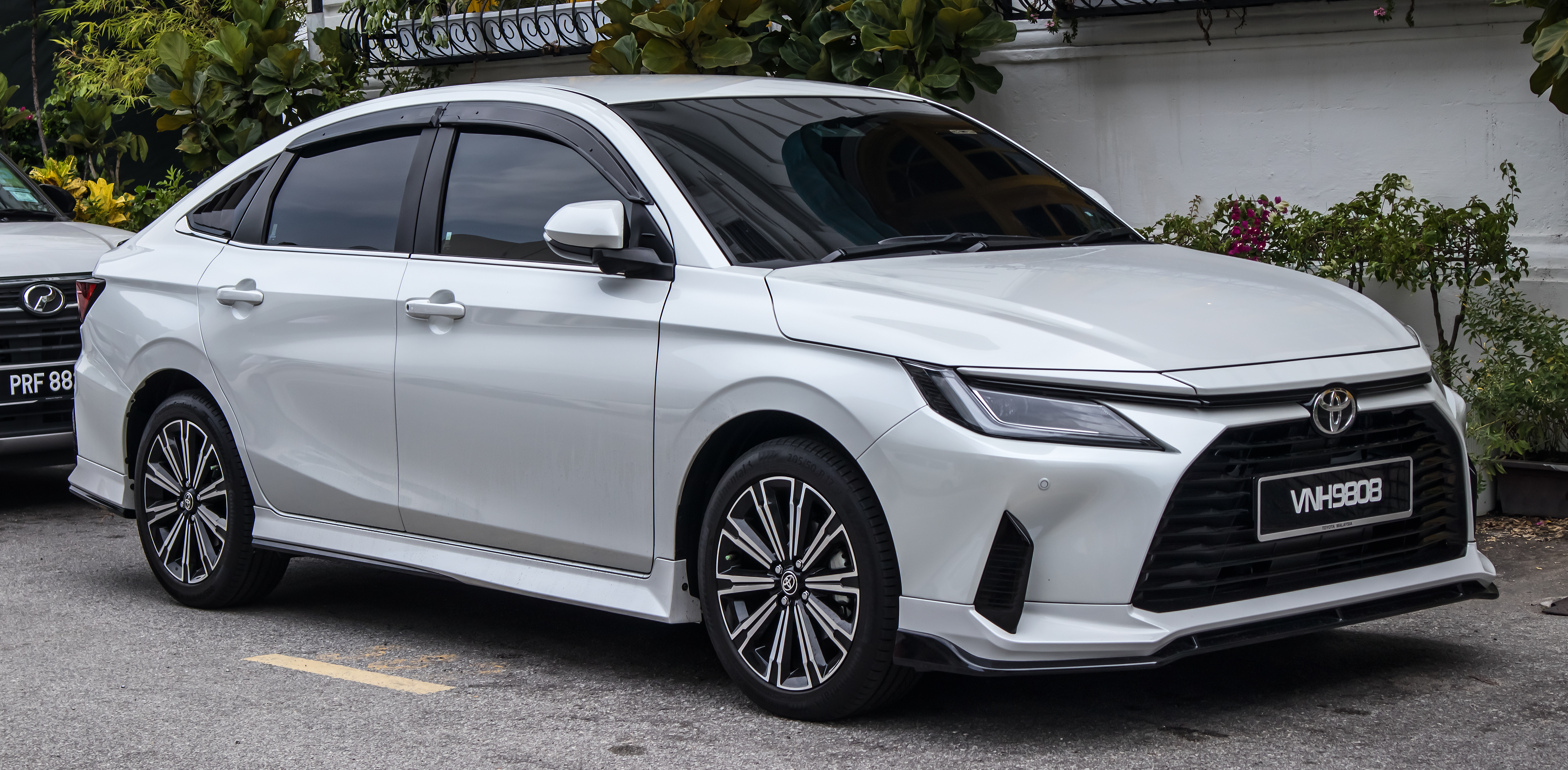
Sedan

== Mazda2-based models (DA/DB/DD; 2015) ==
In 2014, Mazda began production of the Mazda2 in Salamanca, Guanajuato, for various North and South American markets. At the 2015 New York International Auto Show in April of that year, it was announced that this plant would produce a version of the Mazda2 for Toyota with minor styling changes, with the vehicle to be sold in Mexico as the Yaris, in the United States as the Scion iA, and in Canada as the Yaris sedan. In July 2015, Toyota confirmed that the car would be sold in Mexico as the Yaris R.

After the phase-out of the Scion marque in the United States, the car was renamed as the Toyota Yaris iA from August 2016 for the 2017 model year. For the 2019 model year, it was renamed again as the Yaris sedan in the United States, receiving a minor facelift with an updated grille insert and trim changes. Unlike the previous models, which offered only exterior colors and a choice between 6-speed manual and 6-speed automatic transmissions as factory options, both the United States and Canadian 2019 and 2020 Yaris sedans were offered in L, LE and XLE trim levels with a wider variety of interior and exterior options.

A Mazda-built Yaris hatchback—a rebadged Mazda2 with a front fascia similar to that of the Yaris sedan—made its debut at the 2019 New York International Auto Show in April of that year and replaced the XP130 Yaris Liftback in the United States and Canada for the 2020 model year. Its official images were revealed on 1 April 2019. The United States and Canadian Yaris hatchback was offered in LE and XLE trim levels. In the United States, sales of the hatchback began in October 2019.

Both Mazda2-based Yaris models were discontinued in the U.S. in June 2020 due to new regulations and slow sales. In July, Toyota confirmed that sales were also ending in Canada. The vehicles were also discontinued in Mexico in August, leaving only the Thai-imported XP150 series Yaris and Yaris Sedán as its indirect replacements.

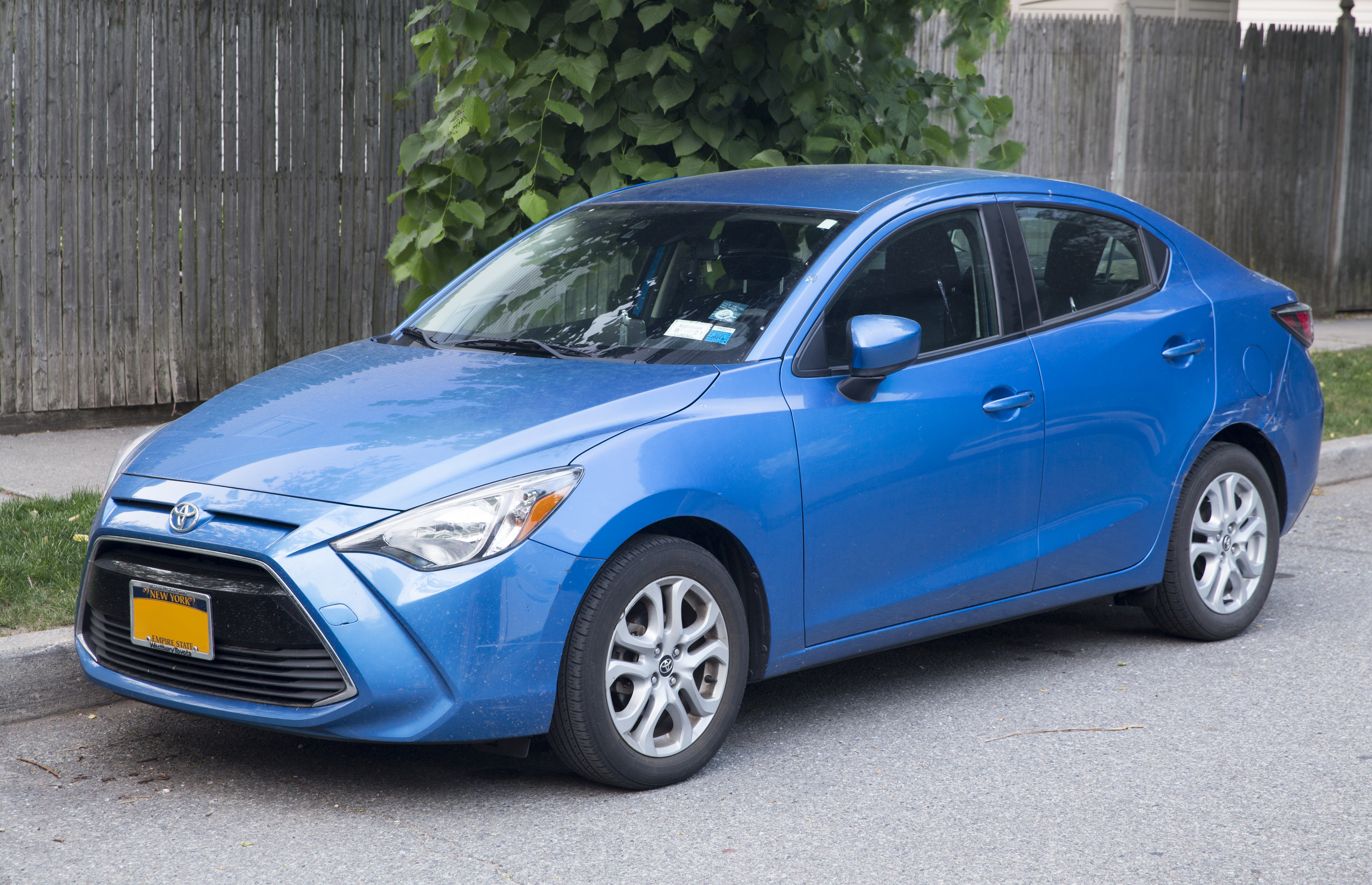
Sedan (North America)

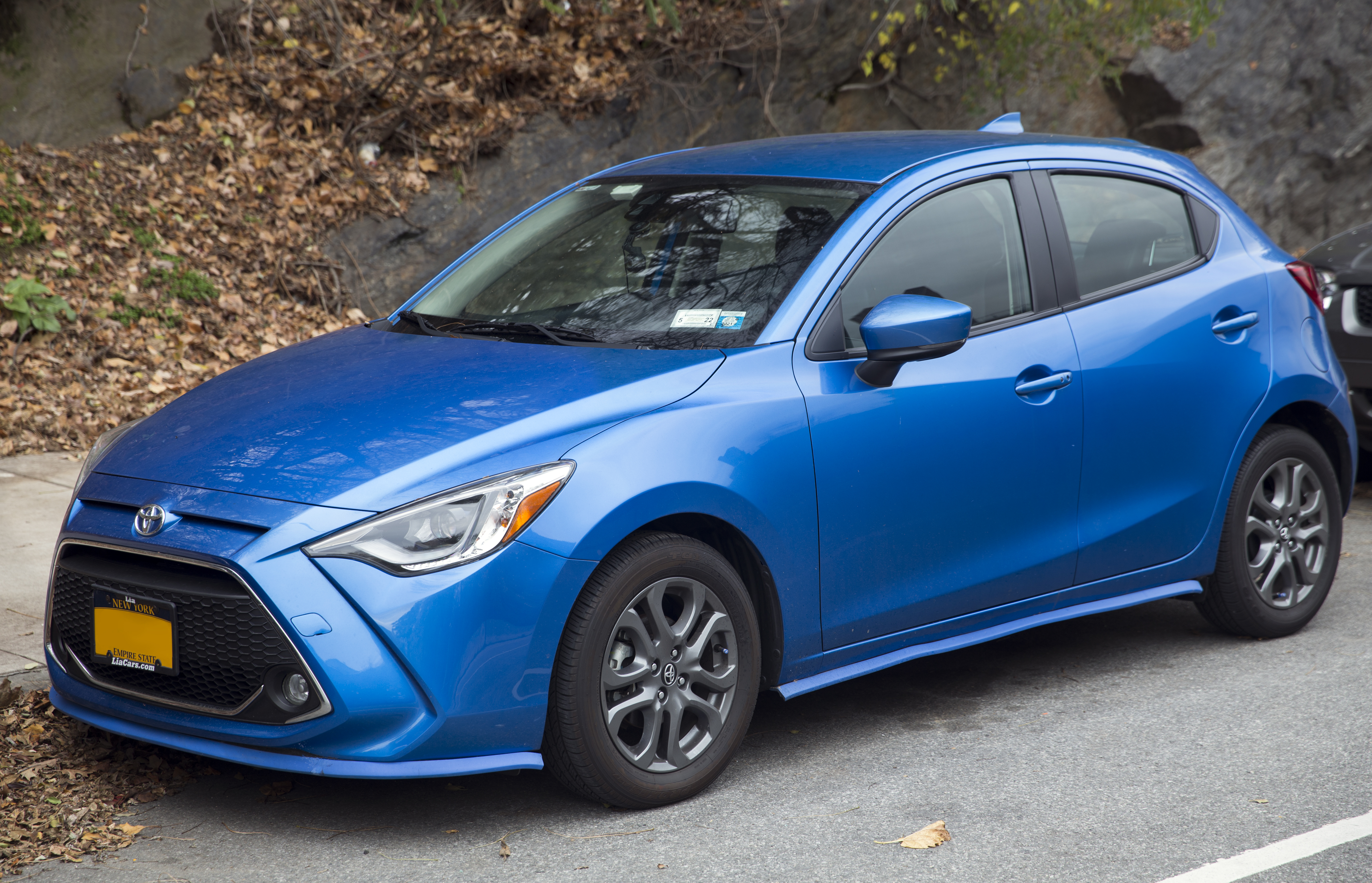
Hatchback (North America)

== Yaris Verso (1999) ==
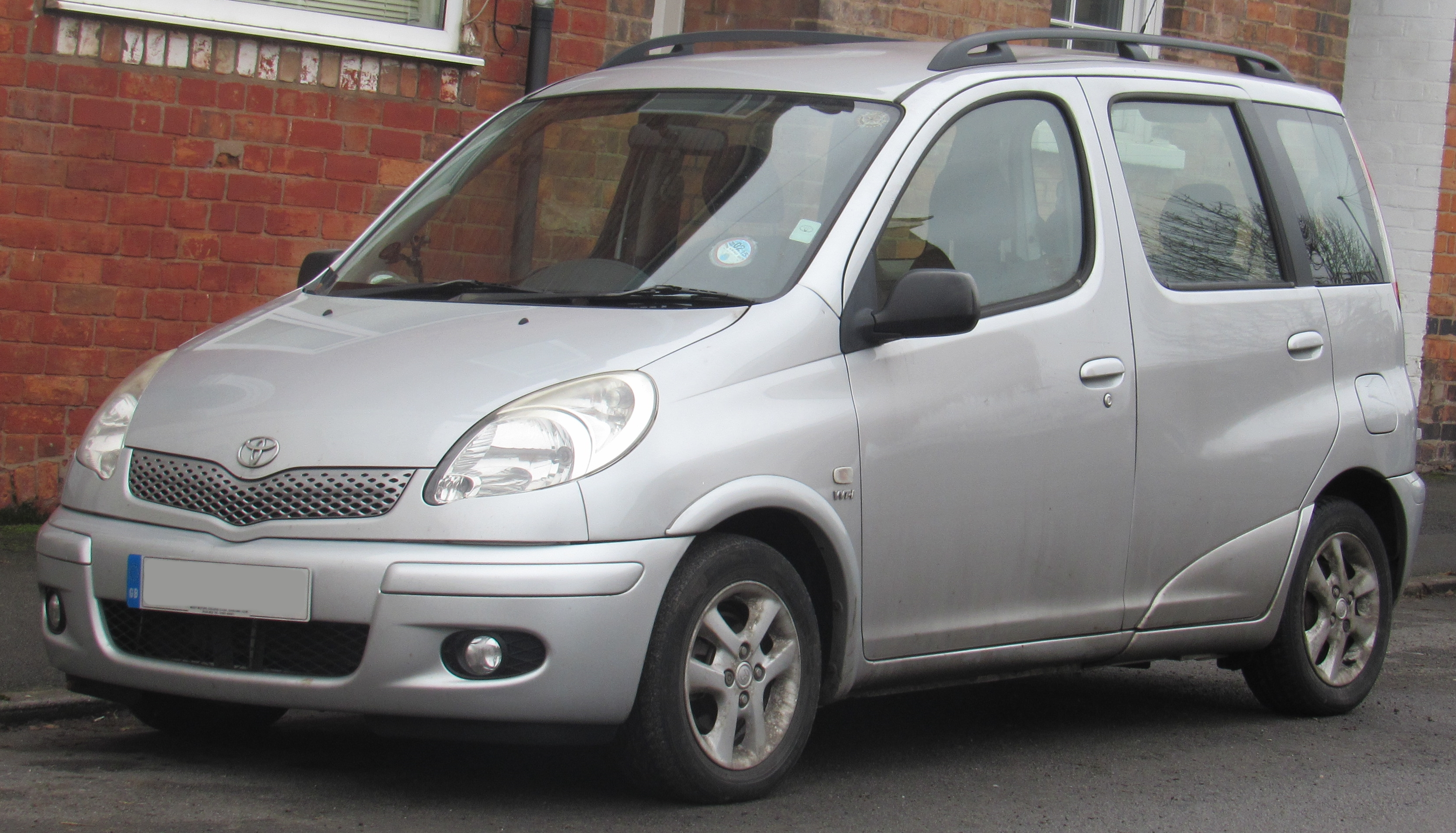
Yaris Verso

The Yaris Verso is a mini MPV that shares the same NBC platform as the XP10 series Yaris/Vitz/Platz/Echo, which was produced between 1999 and 2005. It was succeeded by the Ractis/Verso-S.

== Yaris Cross ==
The Yaris Cross nameplate is used by two subcompact crossover SUVs. The first model was produced since 2020 for Japan, Europe, Singapore, Australasia, Colombia and Ecuador. Designated XP210, the model shares the same TNGA-B platform as the XP210 series Yaris. The second model was produced since 2023 for emerging markets such as Southeast Asia (except Singapore) and South America (except Colombia and Ecuador). Designated AC200, the model was developed by Daihatsu and shares the same DNGA-B platform as the AC100 series Vios/Yaris.

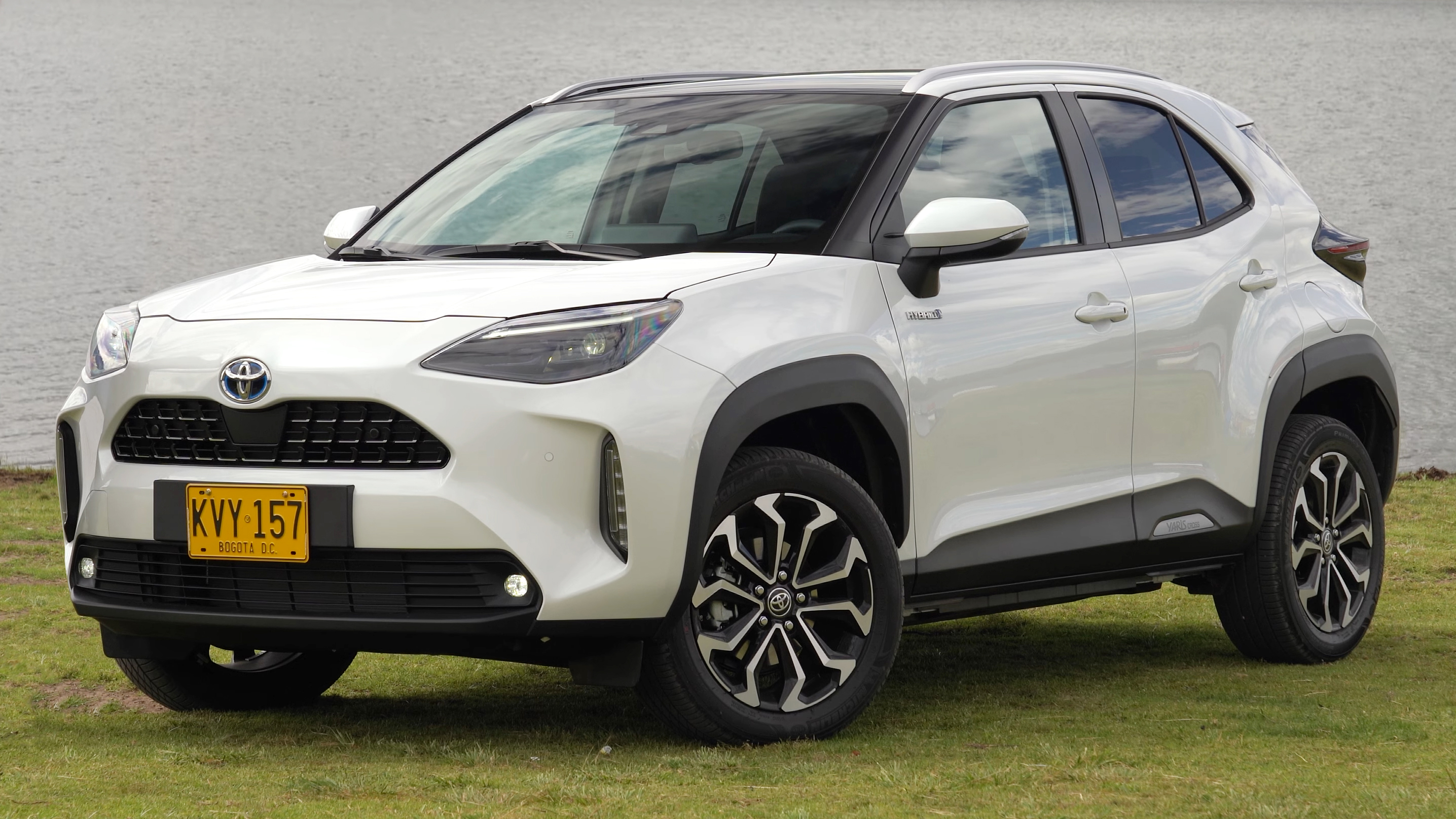
Yaris Cross XP210: Japan, Europe, Singapore, Australasia, Colombia and Ecuador. since 2020

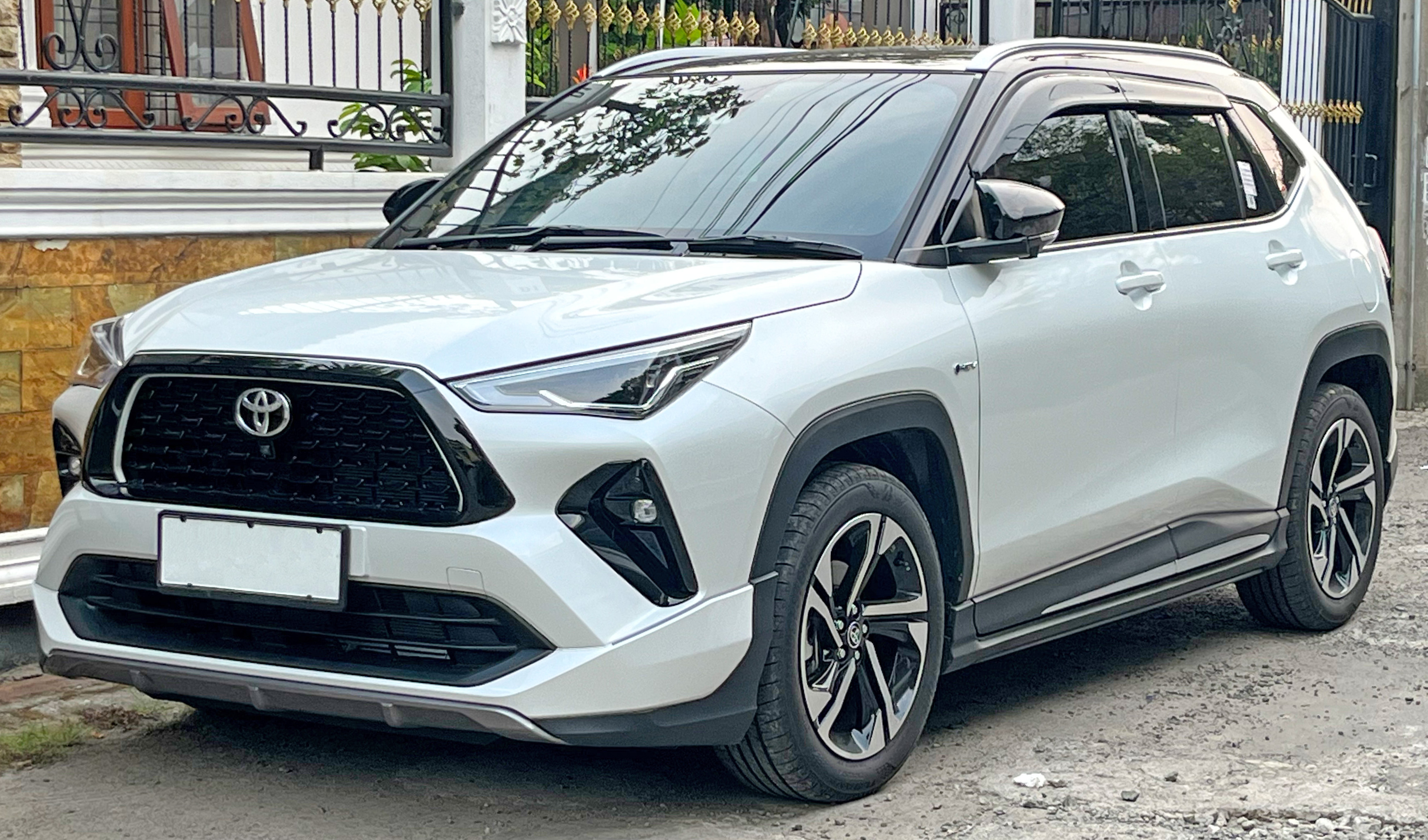
Yaris Cross AC200: Southeast Asia (except Singapore) and South America (except Colombia and Ecuador) since 2023

== Concept models ==
- Yaris Cabrio Concept (2000)
- Yaris Five Axis (2008)
- Yaris HSD Concept (2011)
- Yaris Hybrid-R (2013)
- Yaris Legian (2015)

== Sales ==
| Calendar year | Europe | United States | | Canada | Mexico | | | Australia | China | | Thailand | India | Malaysia (Note: Figures based on registration (Malaysia)) | Indonesia |
| Calendar year | Hatchback | Hatchback | Scion/Yaris iA | Canada | Sedan | Hatchback | Yaris R | Australia | Sedan | Hatchback | Thailand | India | Malaysia | Indonesia |
|---|---|---|---|---|---|---|---|---|---|---|---|---|---|---|
| 1998 | 3 | | | | | | | | | | | | | — |
| 1999 | 124,755 | | | | | | | | | | | | | — |
| 2000 | 187,716 | | | | | | | | | | | | | — |
| 2001 | 195,875 | | | | | | | | | | | | | — |
| 2002 | 195,994 | | | | | | | | | | | | | — |
| 2003 | 193,831 | | | | | | | | | | | | | — |
| 2004 | 231,187 | | | | | | | | | | | | | — |
| 2005 | 213,975 | | | 6,177 | | | | 3,562 | | | | | | — |
| 2006 | 238,420 | 70,308 | | 34,202 | | | | 27,990 | | | | | 370 | 11,034 |
| 2007 | 256,267 | 84,799 | | 34,424 | 9,172 | 3,915 | | 29,663 | | | | | 469 | 9,686 |
| 2008 | 223,673 | 102,328 | | 40,602 | 9,235 | 5,021 | | 26,097 | | 18,868 | | | 143 | 13,614 |
| 2009 | 212,923 | 63,743 | | 23,773 | 4,427 | 2,454 | | | | 17,897 | | | 39 | 7,505 |
| 2010 | 162,534 | 40,076 | | 13,817 | 5,168 | 1,321 | | | | 27,063 | | | 23 | 16,979 |
| 2011 | 141,340 | 32,704 | | 7,968 | 2,539 | 860 | | | | 19,323 | | | 6 | 16,448 |
| 2012 | 172,601 | 30,590 | | 10,955 | 2,007 | 1,064 | | 18,808 | | 12,341 | | | 4 | 27,809 |
| 2013 | 163,326 | 21,342 | | 7,633 | 2,606 | 1,194 | | | | 13,135 | | | 1 | 13,726 |
| 2014 | 169,016 | 13,274 | | 8,530 | 2,121 | 2,572 | | | | 73,299 | 52,809 | | 12 | 17,774 |
| 2015 | 182,407 | 16,779 | 7,605 | 8,196 | 8,000 | 3,018 | 3,099 | | | 64,724 | 36,212 | | 8 | 18,151 |
| 2016 | 192,005 | 10,872 | 27,983 | 7,779 | 13,365 | 3,015 | 6,762 | | | 63,443 | 36,684 | | 1 | 15,368 |
| 2017 | 198,578 | 8,653 | 35,727 | 7,061 | 15,712 | 3,905 | 2,932 | | 40,414 | 54,089 | 44,200 | | 1 | 10,750 |
| 2018 | 215,968 | 1,940 | 25,269 | 7,236 | 16,643 | 3,930 | 2,259 | | 41,355 | 54,335 | 68,254 | | 0 | 10,030 |
| 2019 | 211,216 | 21,916 | | 6,256 | 9,451 | 1,919 | 1,122 | 9,853 | 49,062 | 66,062 | 26,679 | | 10,803 | 8,033 |
| 2020 | 179,867 | 6,436 | | 2,399 | 7,059 | 962 | 408 | 5,027 | 25,436 | 88,300 | 20,337 | 3,807 | 14,511 | 4,556 |
| 2021 | 182,590 | —N/a | | | 9,266 | 1,380 | | 4,495 | | | 44,762 | | 14,607 | 6,819 |
| 2022 | 185,781 | —N/a | | | 10,415 | 1,213 | | 2,979 | | | 55,355 | | 13,857 | 3,187 |
| 2023 | 166,925 | —N/a | | | 11,594 | 2,383 | | | | | 74,366 | | 12,480 | 1,436 |
| 2024 | 176,782 | —N/a | | | 11,791 | 2,325 | | 2,263 | | | 51,029 | | 10,710 | 373 |
| 2025 | 167,019 | —N/a | | | | | | | | | 63,779 | | 7,908 | 184 |

== See also ==
- List of Toyota vehicles
