= BMW 1 Series =

Subcompact executive car

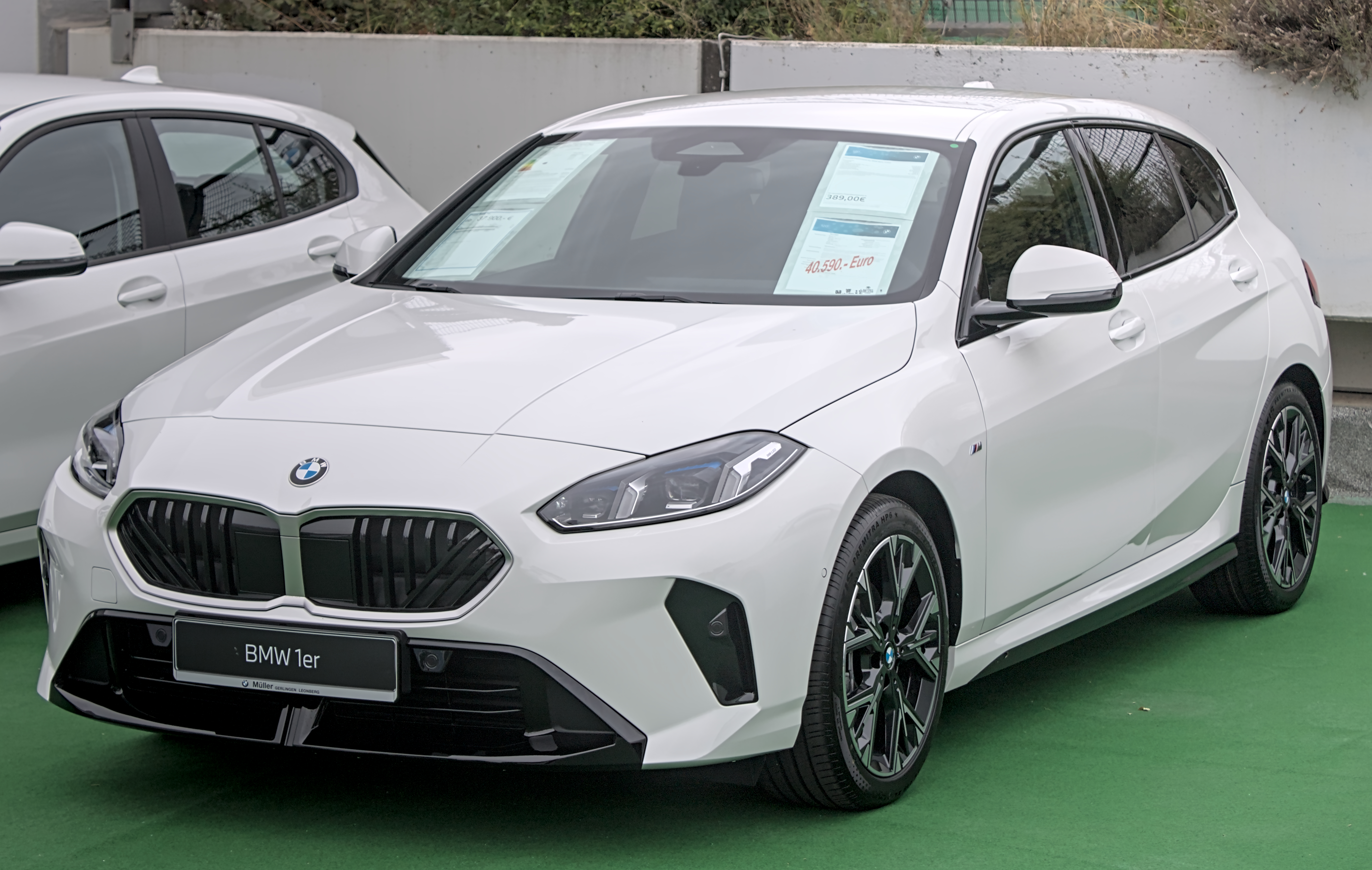
- BMW 1 Series (F70)

Overview
- Manufacturer: BMW
- Production: 2004–present

Body and chassis
- Class: Subcompact executive car (C)

Chronology
- Predecessor: BMW 3 Series Compact
- Successor: BMW 2 Series (coupé/convertible)

The BMW 1 Series is a range of subcompact executive cars (C-segment) manufactured by BMW since 2004. It is the successor to the BMW 3 Series Compact and is currently in its fourth generation. Positioned as the entry-level model in BMW range of products, the first generation was produced in hatchback, coupé and convertible body styles.

Since 2014, the coupé and convertible models have been marketed separately as the 2 Series, therefore the 1 Series range no longer includes these body styles. A four-door sedan model became available for the Chinese market in 2017, using the front-wheel drive platform that is also used the basis for the third-generation 1 Series hatchback.

A high-performance BMW M version called the BMW 1 Series M Coupé was produced for the first generation. Due to the 1 Series coupé model being replaced by the 2 Series, the 1 Series M Coupé was replaced by the BMW M2 in 2016.

For the first two generations, the 1 Series used a rear-wheel drive layout, while all-wheel drive was introduced as an option since 2012. For the third generation introduced in 2019, the 1 Series switched to a front-wheel drive layout, while retaining the all-wheel drive option.

== First generation (E81/E82/E87/E88; 2004) ==
The first generation of the 1 Series consists of the following body styles:

- 3-door hatchback (E81)
- 5-door hatchback (E87)
- coupé (E82)
- convertible (E88)

This generation was produced from 2004 to 2013 and is sometimes collectively referred to as the E8x. The E8x replaced the 3 Series Compact as the entry-level models of the BMW range. All models were rear-wheel drive, which was a rare configuration in the hatchback market segment. The engines available were four-cylinder turbo-diesel, four-cylinder naturally aspirated petrol, six-cylinder naturally aspirated petrol and six-cylinder turbocharged petrol (the latter only available on coupé and convertible models).

The 1 Series M Coupé is powered by the BMW N54 turbocharged inline-six engine and uses a six-speed manual transmission. It was produced in only the coupé body style and is considered the predecessor to the BMW M2.

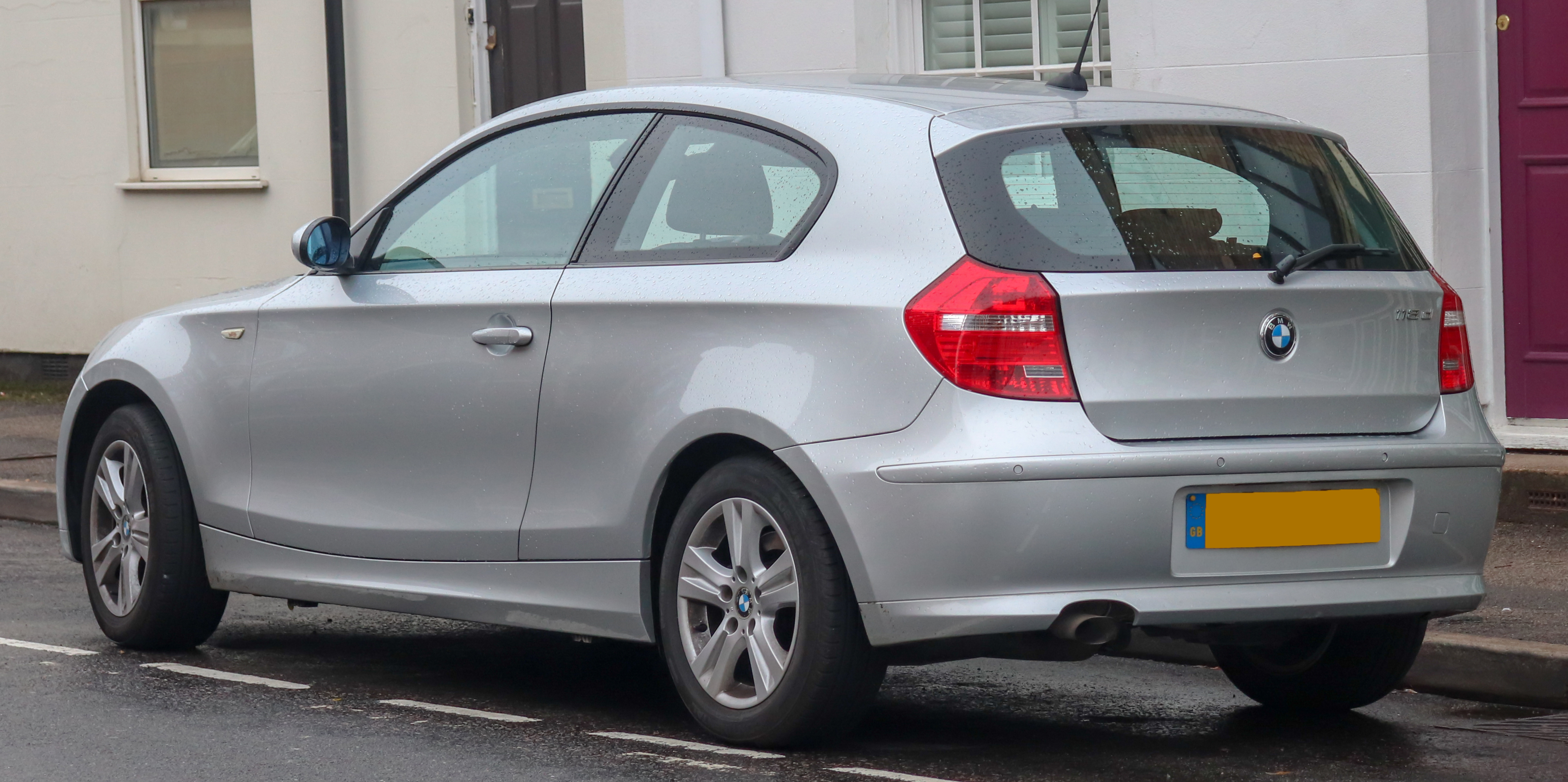
BMW 1 Series (E81)

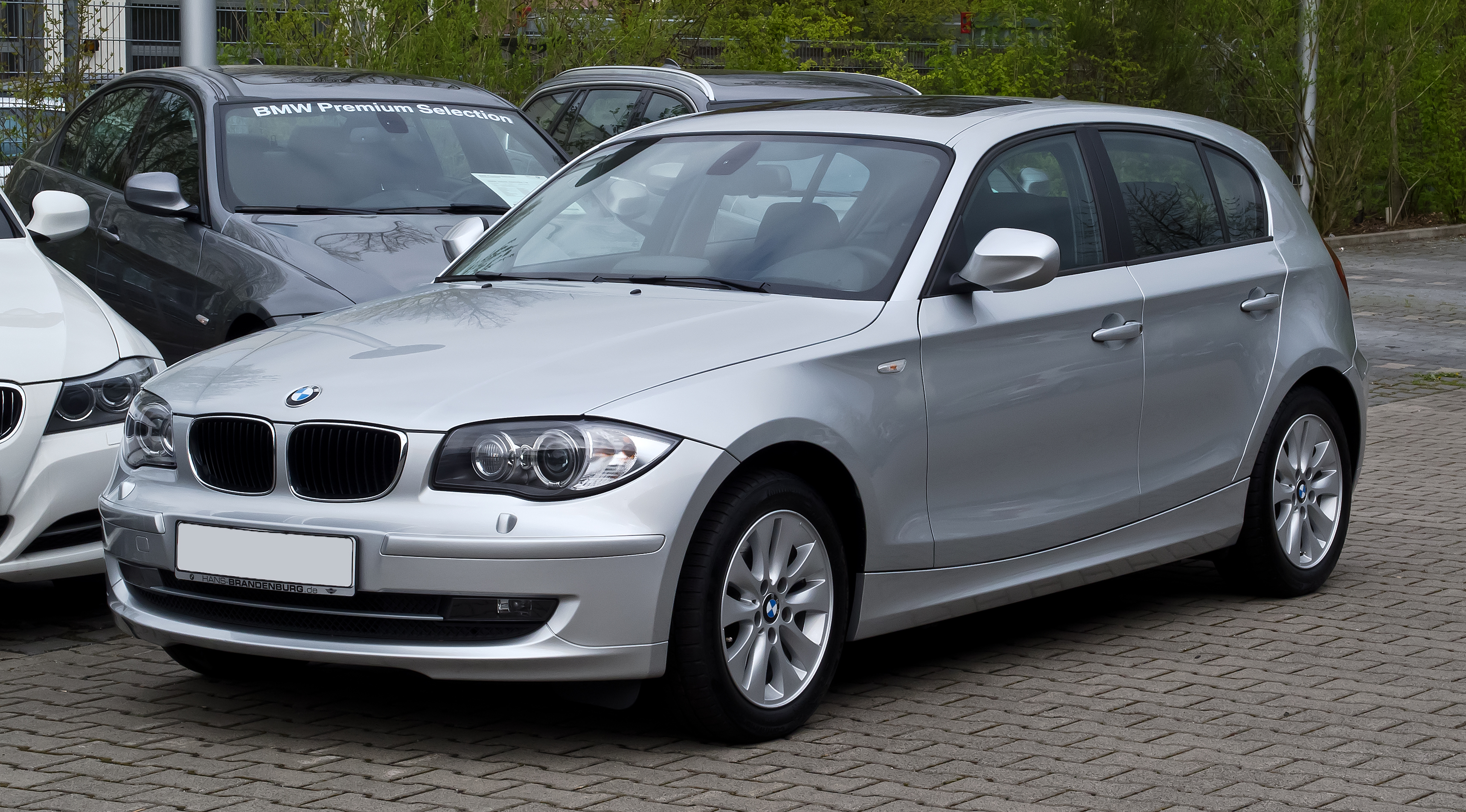
BMW 1 Series (E87)

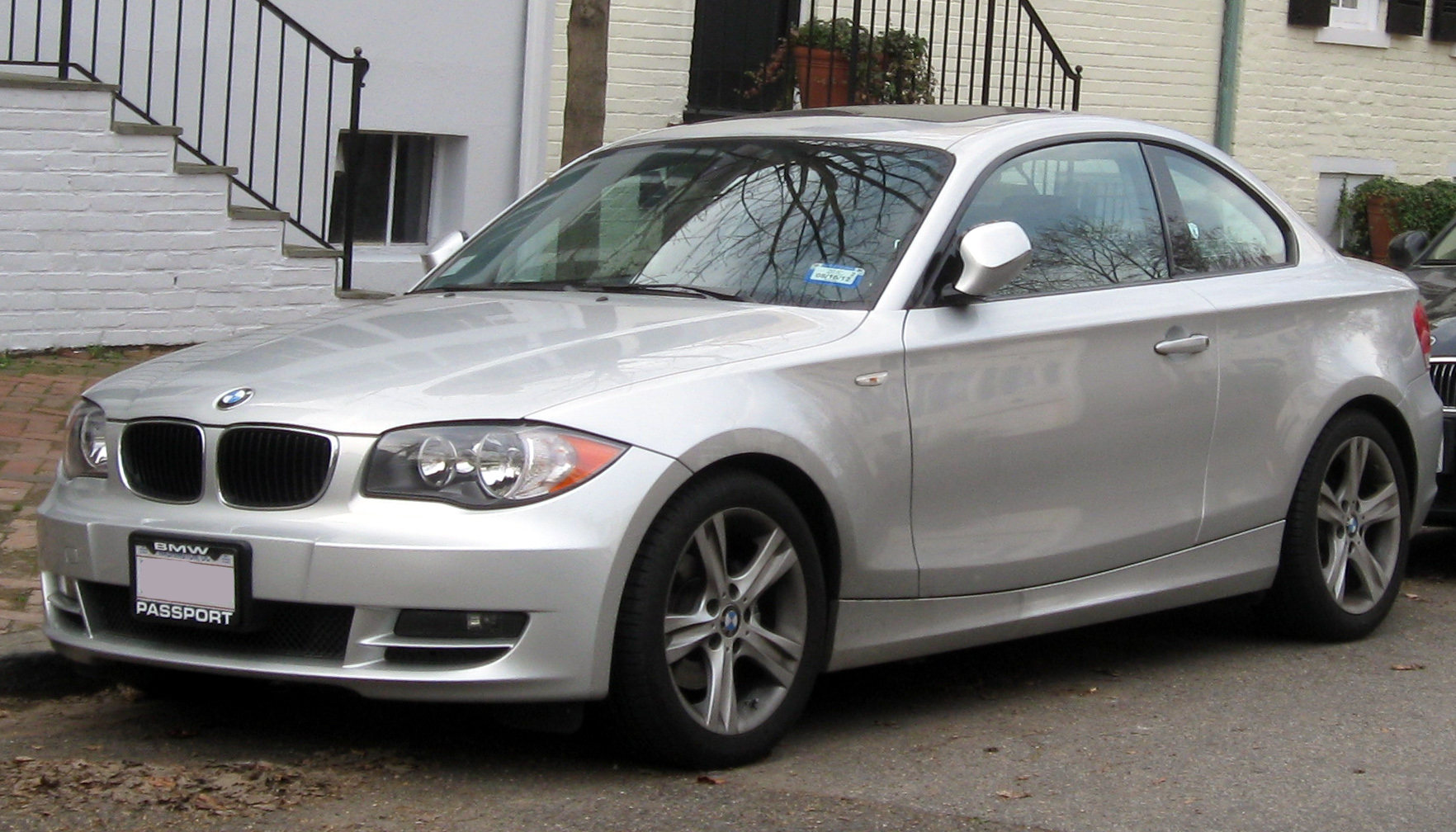
BMW 1 Series Coupé (E82)

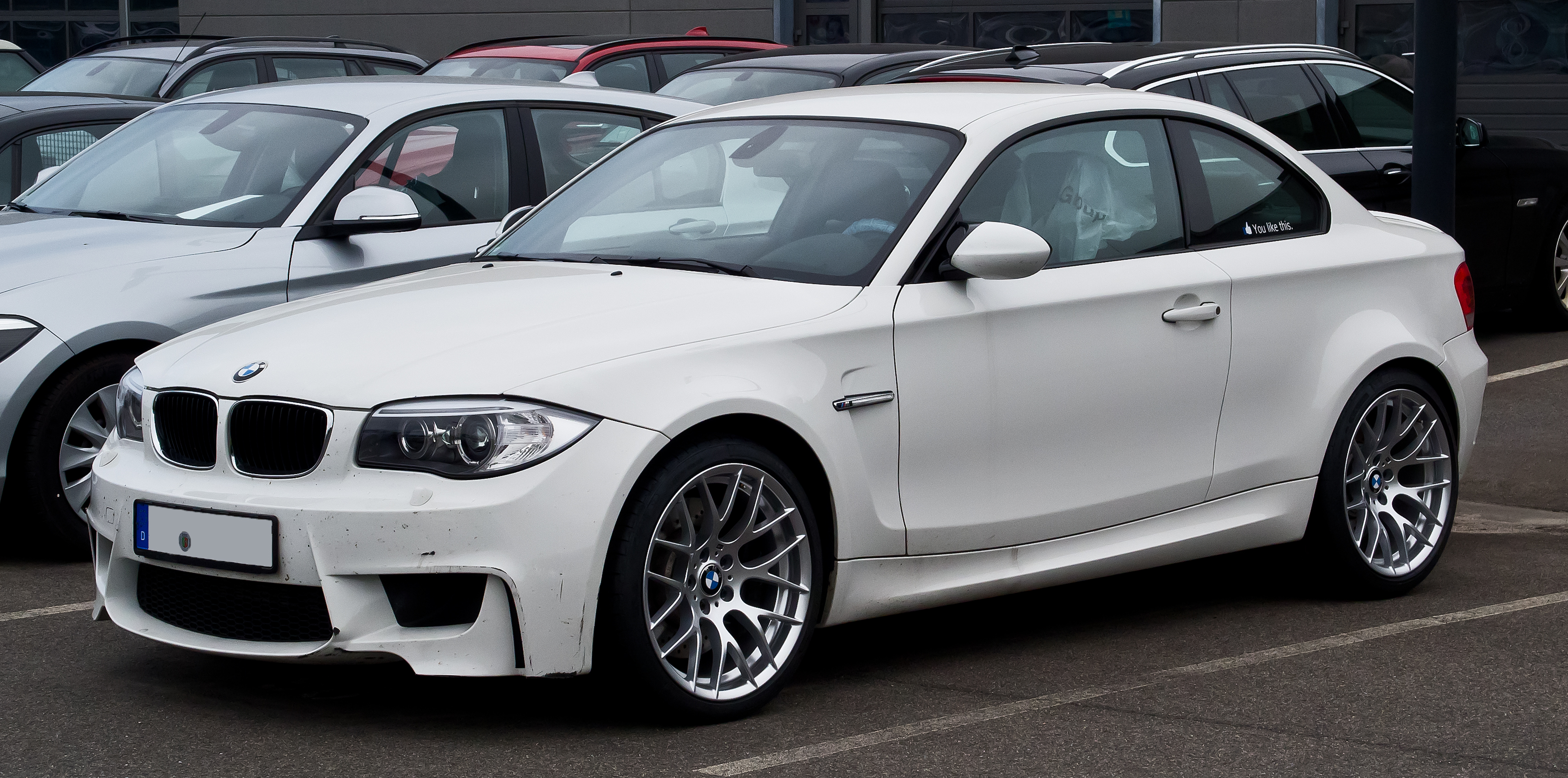
BMW 1 Series M Coupé (E82)

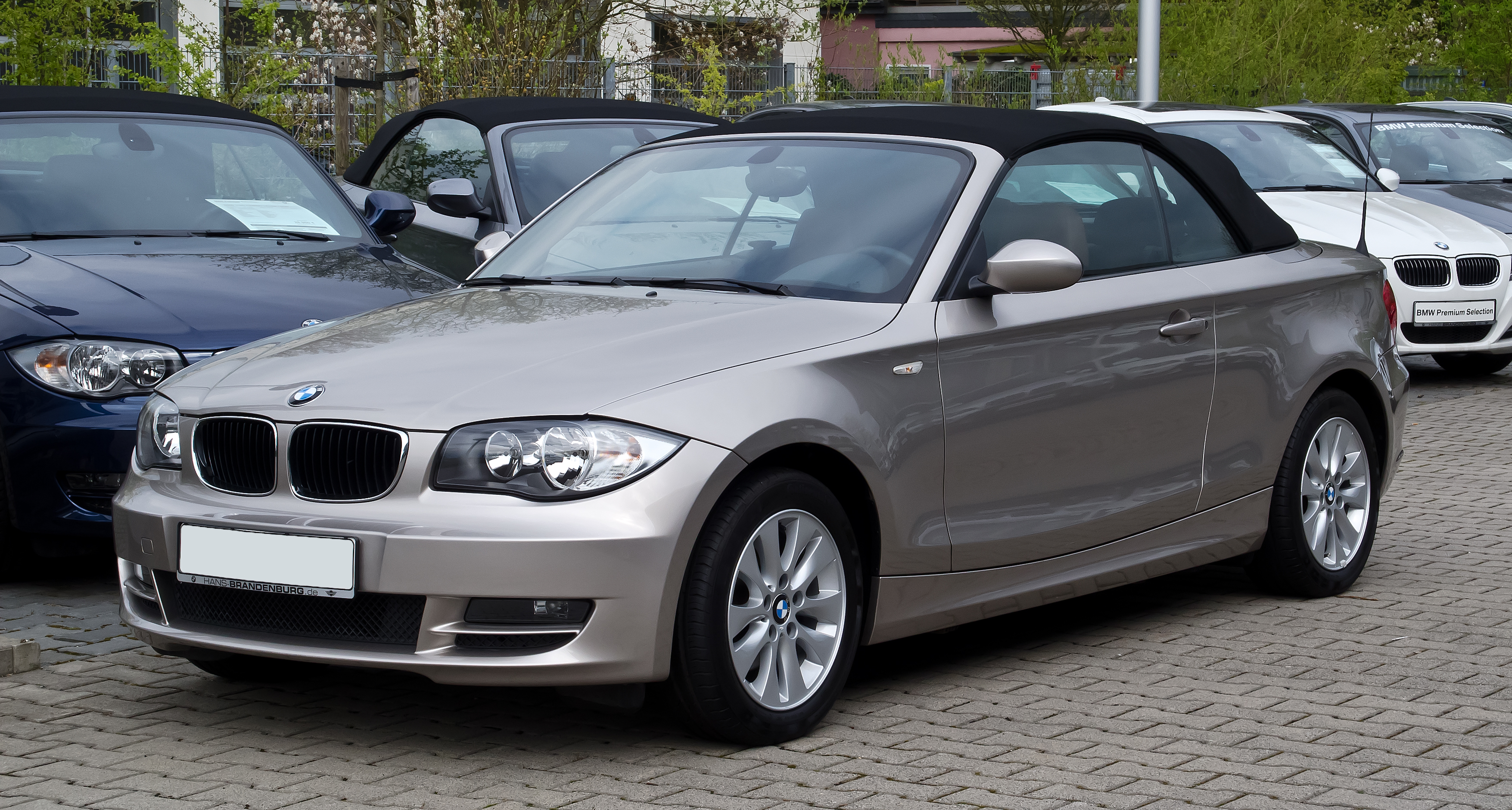
BMW 1 Series Cabriolet (E88)

== Second generation (F20/F21; 2011) ==
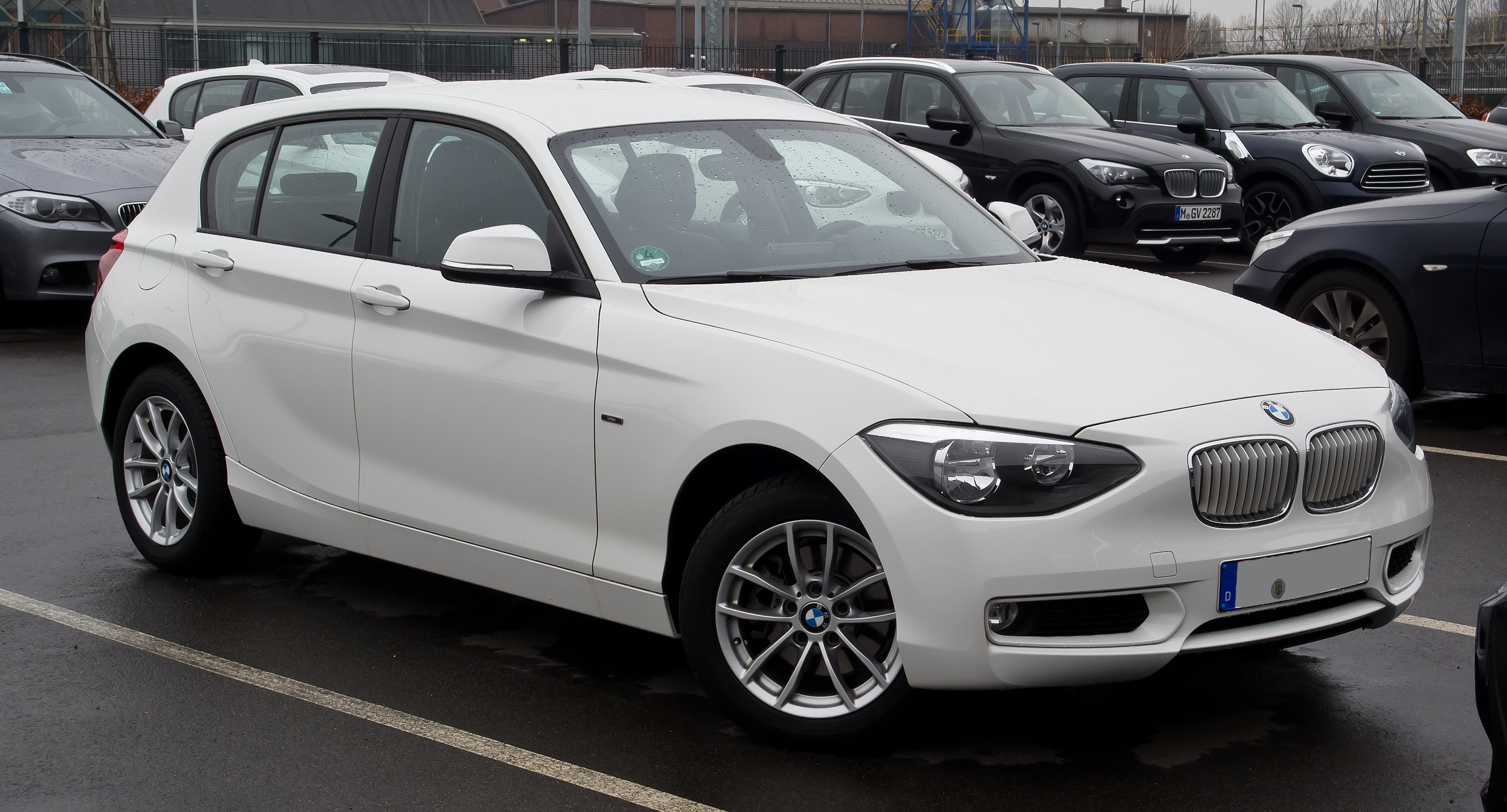
BMW 1 Series (F20)

The second generation of the 1 Series consists of the following body styles:

- 5-door hatchback (F20)
- 3-door hatchback (F21)

From this generation onwards, the coupé and convertible models have been marketed separately using the BMW 2 Series nameplate.

This generation was produced from 2011 to 2019 and is often collectively referred to as the F20.

The F20/F21 was initially powered by inline-four petrol, inline-four diesel and inline-six petrol engines. In 2015, inline-three petrol and diesel engines were added to the model range. All engines are turbocharged.

Unlike most hatchback competitors, the F20/F21 uses rear-wheel drive (rather than front-wheel drive) for most models. The F20/F21 is the first 1 Series to offer an optional all-wheel drive (called "xDrive" by BMW).

== Third generation (F40; 2019) ==
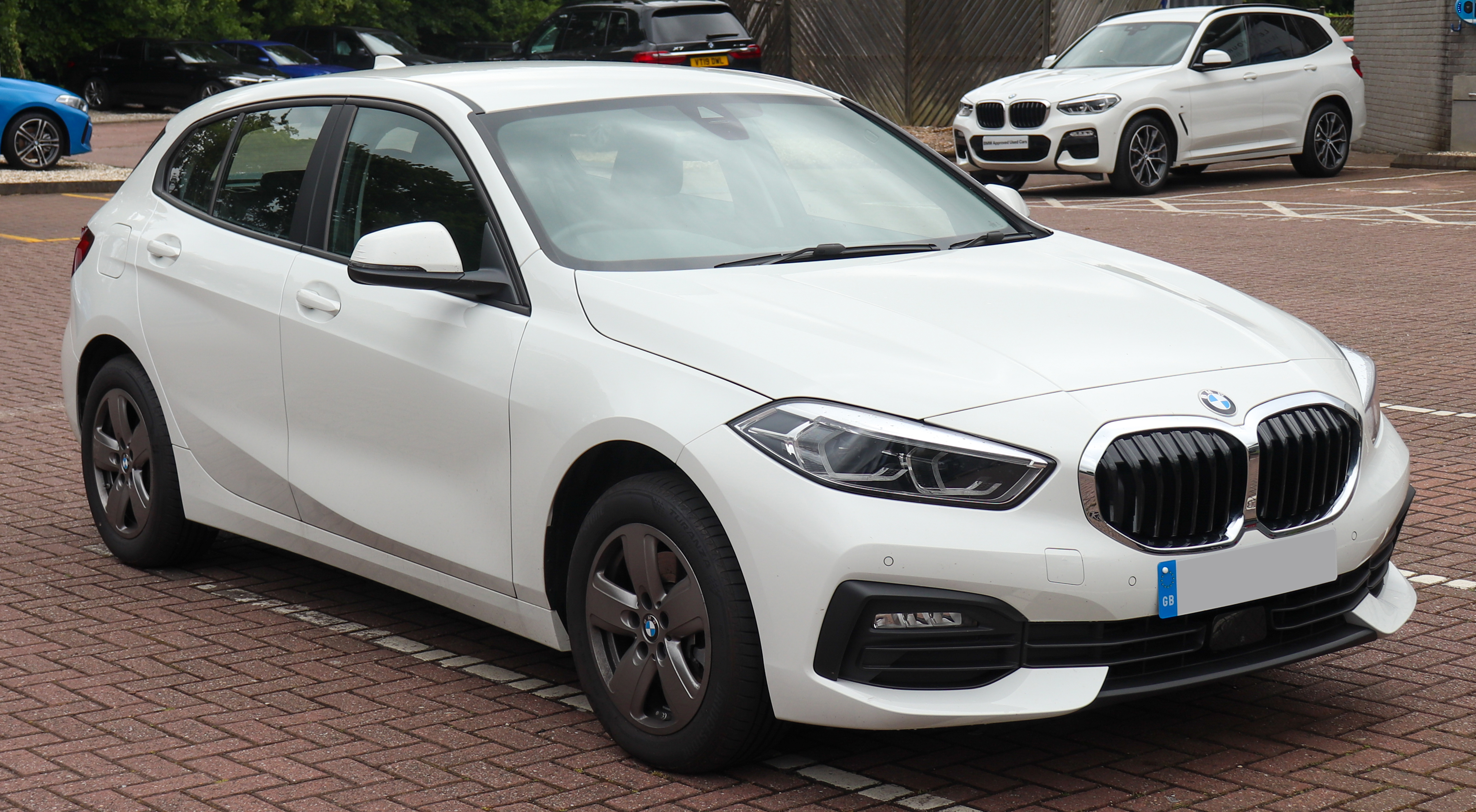
BMW 1 Series (F40)

The third generation of the 1 Series was released in 2019. Unlike the previous generation F20 1 Series, the F40 1 Series uses a front-wheel drive configuration with an all-wheel drive option, and sharing its platform with the F48 X1, F39 X2, 2 Series Gran Coupé, and others. The F40 1 Series is only available as a 5-door hatchback.

== Fourth generation (F70; 2024) ==
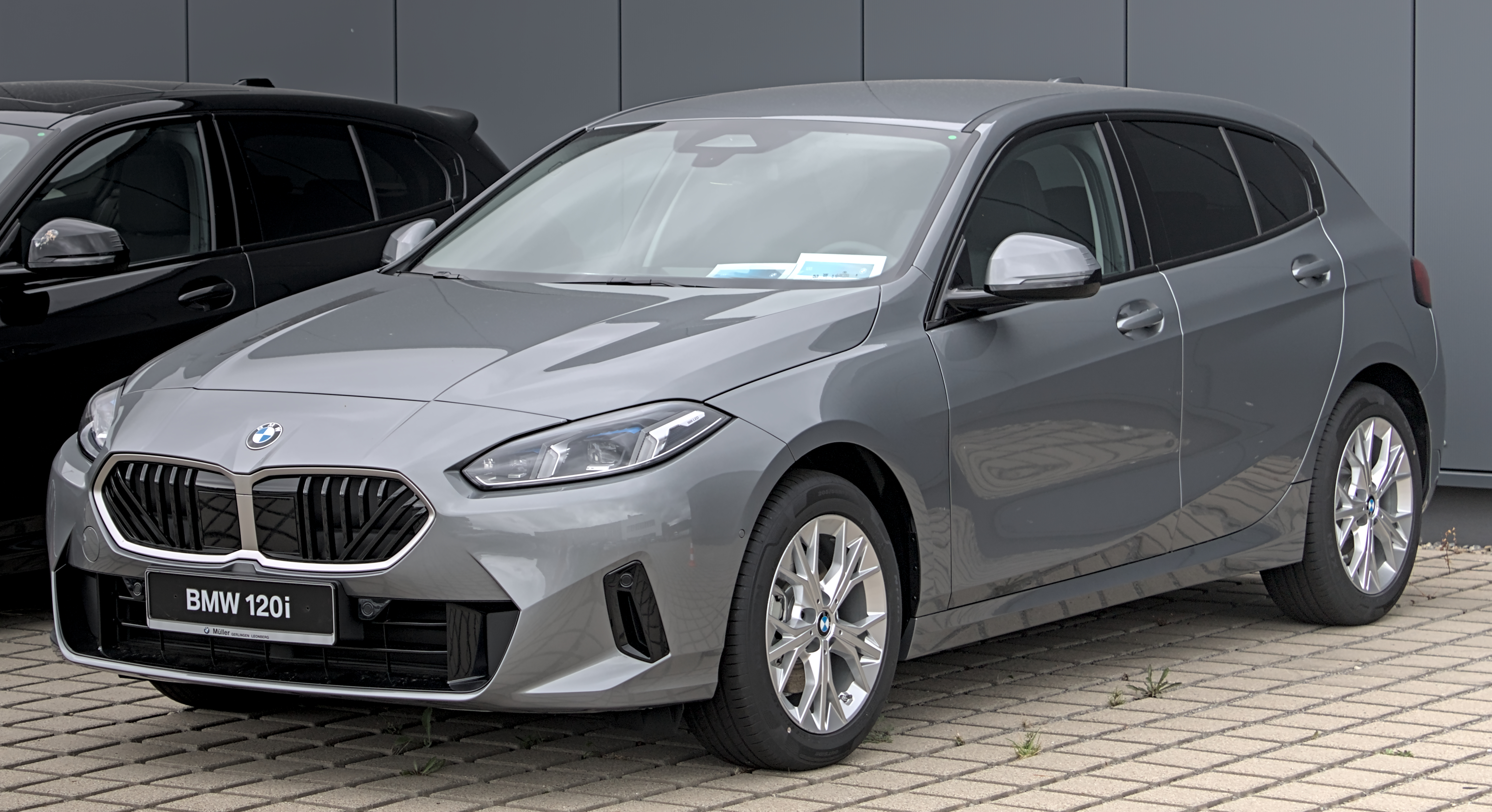
BMW 1 Series (F70)

The fourth generation of the 1 Series was officially unveiled on 4 June 2024 and set to commence production later in 2024. Like its predecessor F40 1 Series, the F70 1 Series is based on the front-wheel drive based UKL2 platform and comes solely as a 5-door hatchback. Despite using a different internal codename to its predecessor, the F70 1 Series is a heavy refresh of the F40 1 Series instead of a complete redesign.

== China-market sedan (F52; 2017) ==
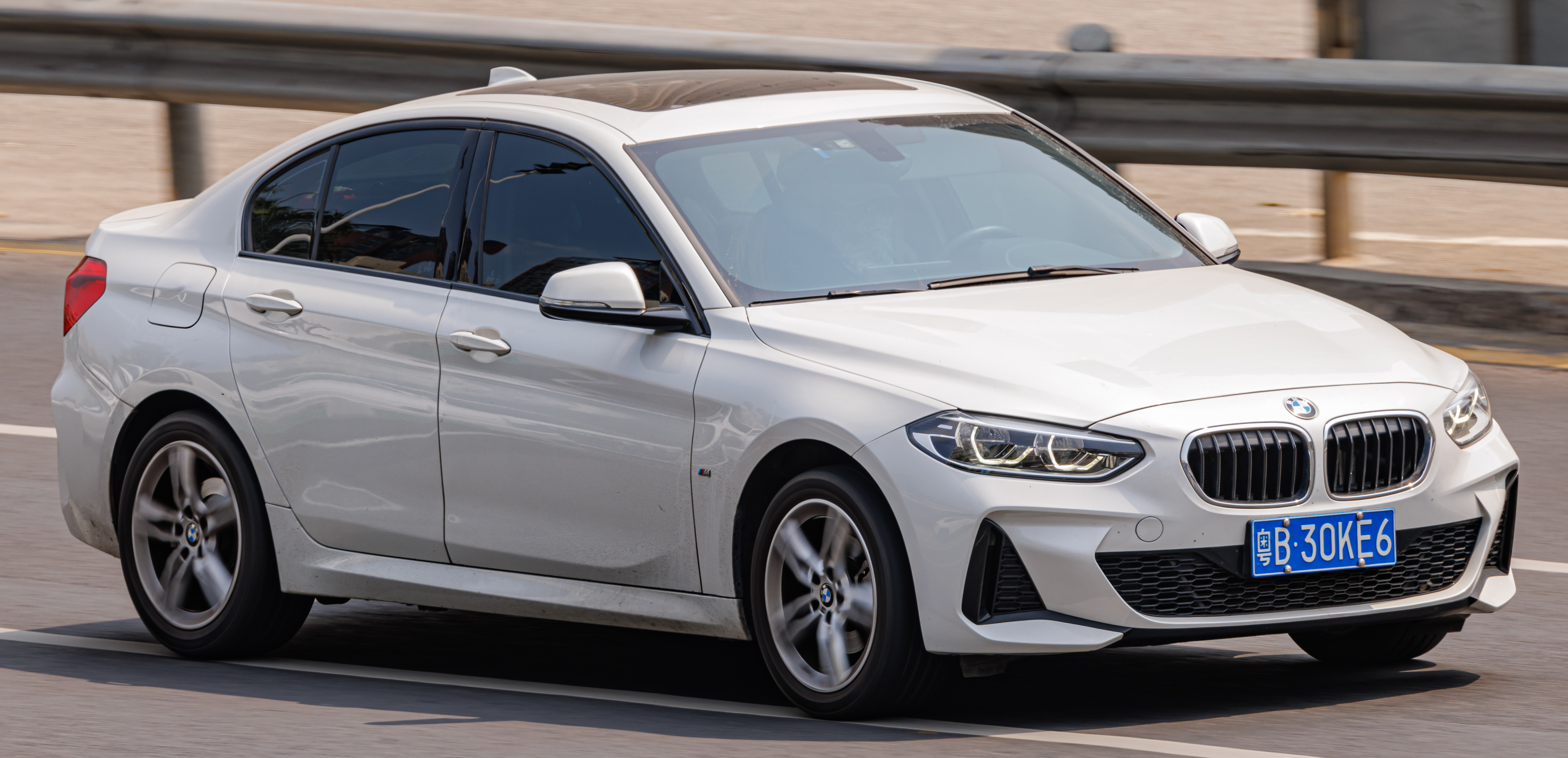
BMW 1 Series sedan (F52)

The 1 Series (F52) is a four-door sedan that began production in 2017 in China. The F52 has been built specifically for the Chinese market by BMW Brilliance, a joint venture between BMW and Brilliance Auto. Unlike other BMW 1 Series cars of the time, it uses the front-wheel drive UKL platform. The F52 was later sold in Mexico in 2018. Production of this model ended in 2023.

== Production and sales ==
Year	Production	Sales				
Year	Production	Europe	US	Canada	Mexico	China
2004	39,247	39,247				
2005	149,493	133,953				
2006	151,918	132,216				
2007	165,803	142,192				
2008	225,095	187,691	12,018			
2009	216,944	174,185	11,182			
2010	196,004	147,623	13,132			
2011	176,418	135,105	8,832		35	
2012	226,829	153,791	8,294	1,093	1,533	
2013	213,611	152,808	7,220	881	1,641	
2014	190,033	131,847	—	2	1,540	
2015	182,158	130,494	—	3	1,573	
2016	176,032	132,287	—	—	1,481	
2017	201,968	137,959	—	—	1,429	
2018	199,980	127,681	—	—	1,985	
2019	173,870	112,068	—	—	1,549	
2020	164,056	107,870	—	—	657	
2021		96,410	—	—	547	
2022		65,994	—	—	385	
2023						15,953
2024						234
2025						3

== See also ==
- List of BMW vehicles
