= Facelift (automotive) =

Changes to a car, truck or bus's styling

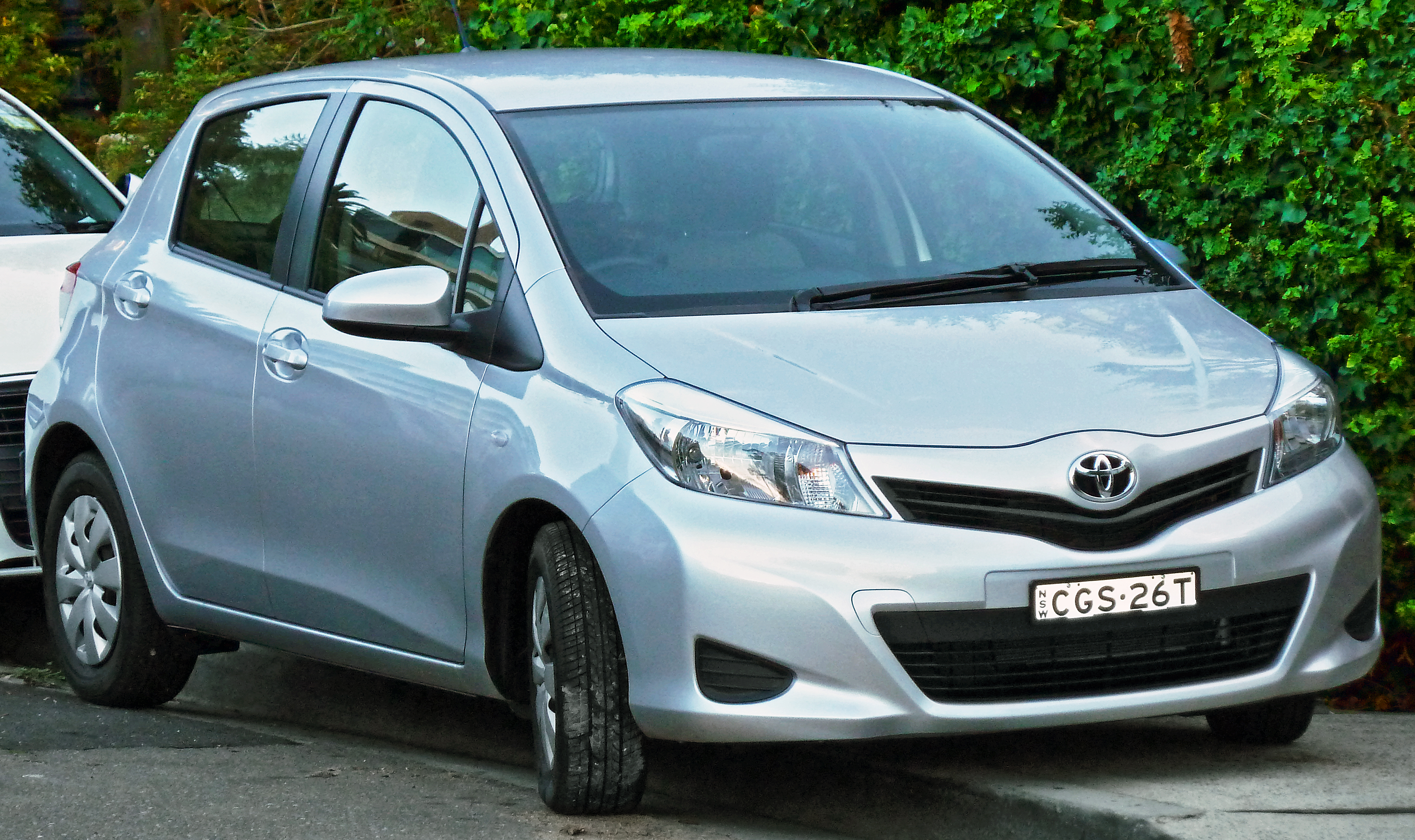
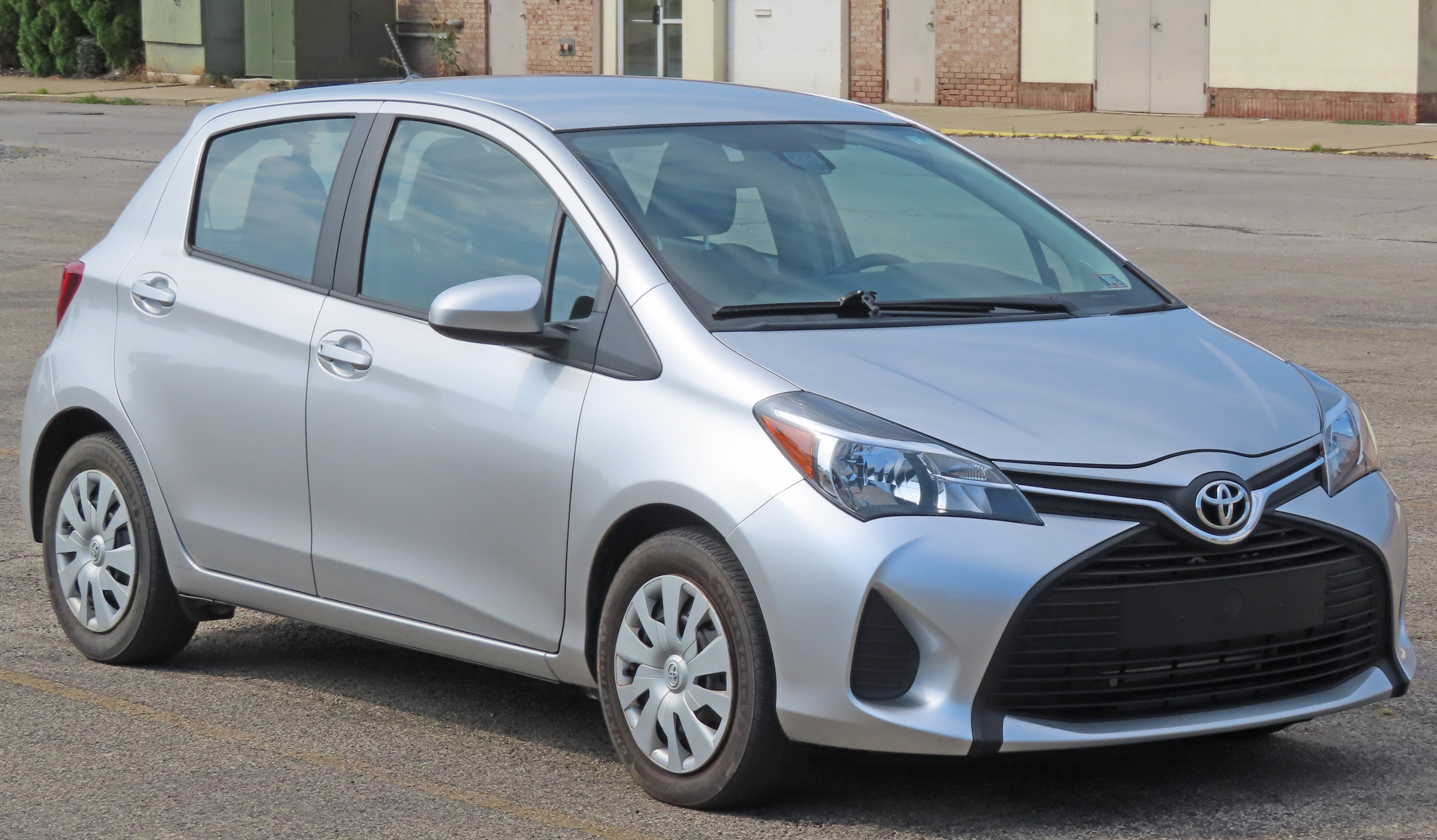

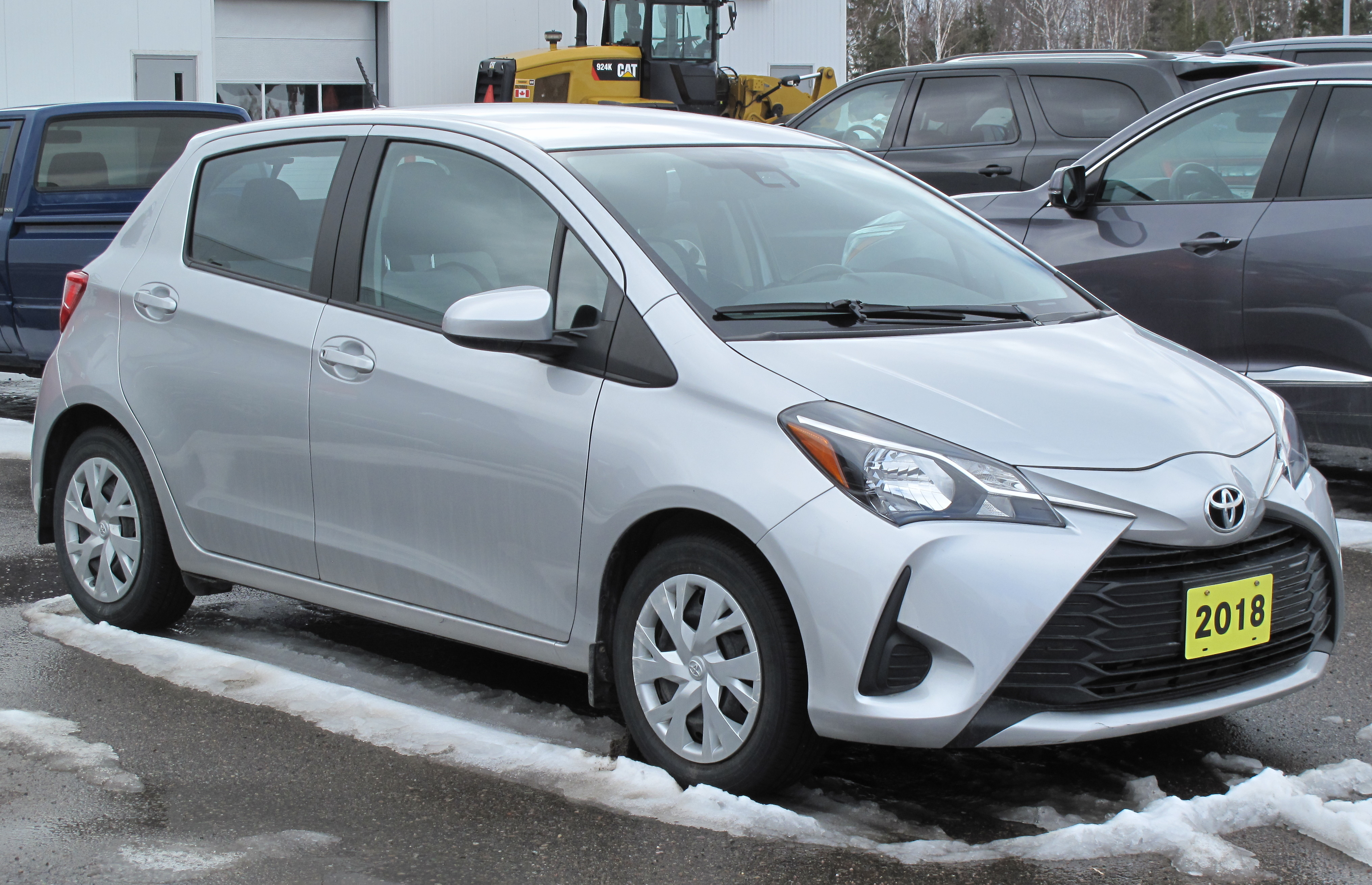
Toyota Yaris (XP130), 2011–2013 with its 2014 and 2017 facelifts

An automotive facelift, also known as mid-cycle refresh (MCR), minor model change, minor model update, or life cycle impulse, is a change to a vehicle's styling during its production run including (to highly variable degree) new sheetmetal, interior design elements or mechanical changes, allowing a carmaker to freshen a model without a complete redesign. While the life cycle of cars hovers around six to eight years until a full model change, facelifts are generally introduced around three years in their production cycle.

A facelift retains the basic styling and platform of the car, with aesthetic alterations, e.g., changes to the front fascia (grille, headlights), taillights, bumpers, instrument panel and center console, and various body or interior trim accessories. Mechanical changes may or may not occur concurrently with the facelift (e.g., changes to the engine, suspension or transmission).

== History ==
In the 1920s, General Motors under the leadership of Alfred P. Sloan at the time had lost market share to Ford, which relied on the Model T as their best-selling model. Sloan is credited of establishing a strategy in which the company introduces annual styling changes to their vehicles in order to regain market share. Ford, on the other hand, refused to remodel the Model T until the 1930s, during which time Ford had lost market share to GM. Since then, the idea of this model change also spread to various industrial products other than automobiles. The strategy has made vehicles owned by consumers artificially out of fashion, thus creating a stimulation for customers to purchase new vehicles. The strategy is also considered as a form of planned obsolescence.

== Definitions ==
Mazda6 (GJ) interior

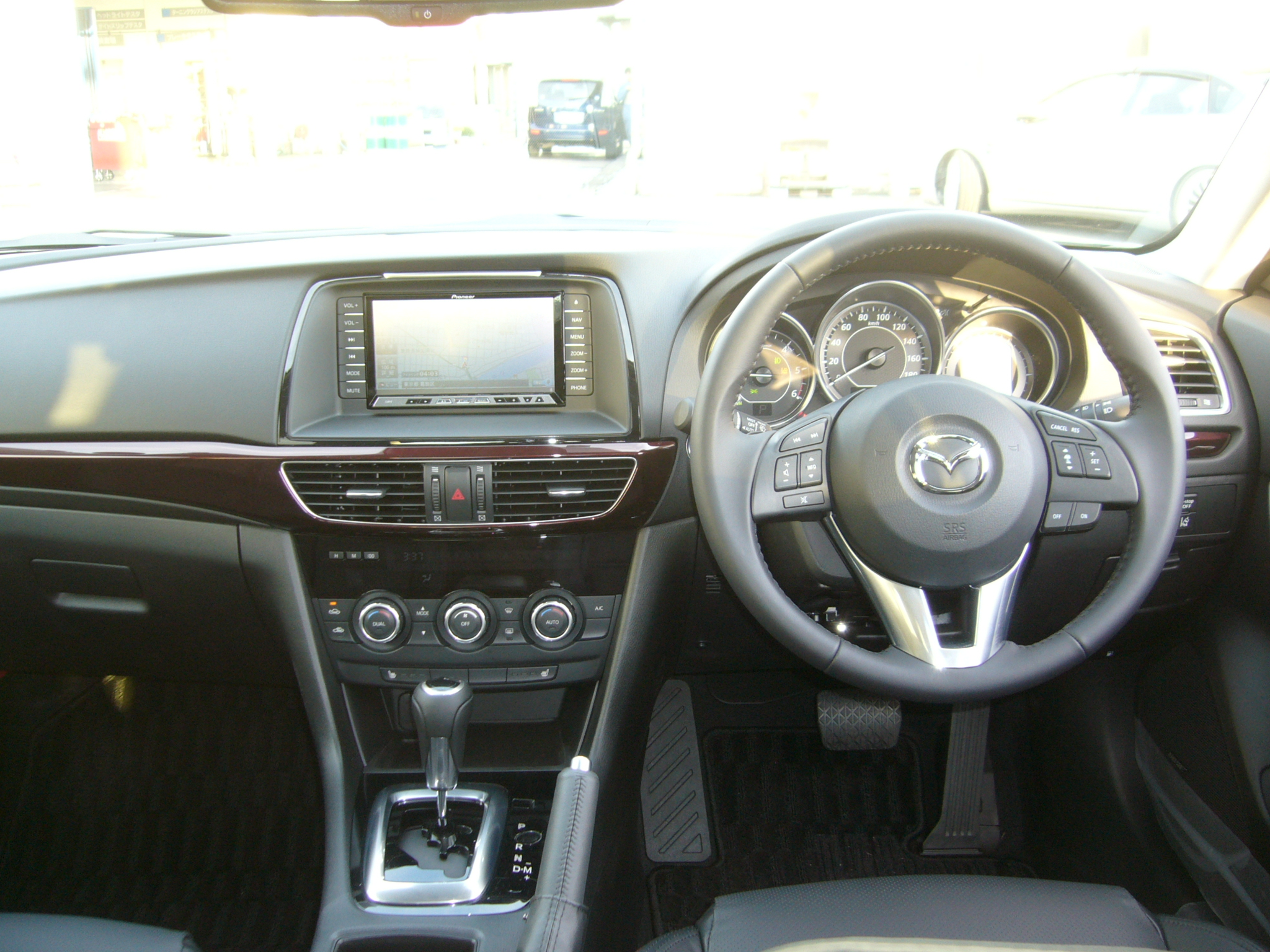
Pre-facelift

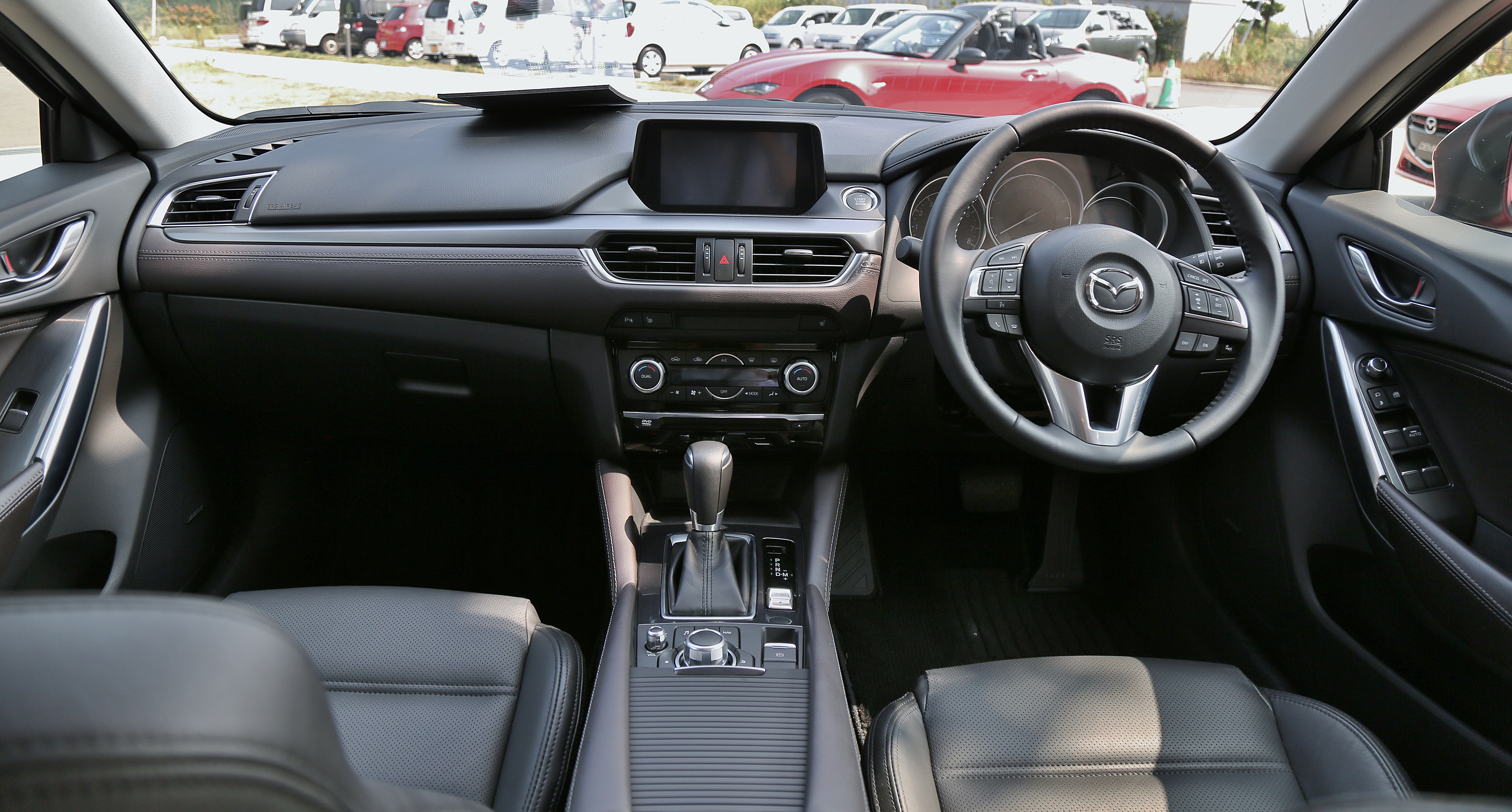
First facelift

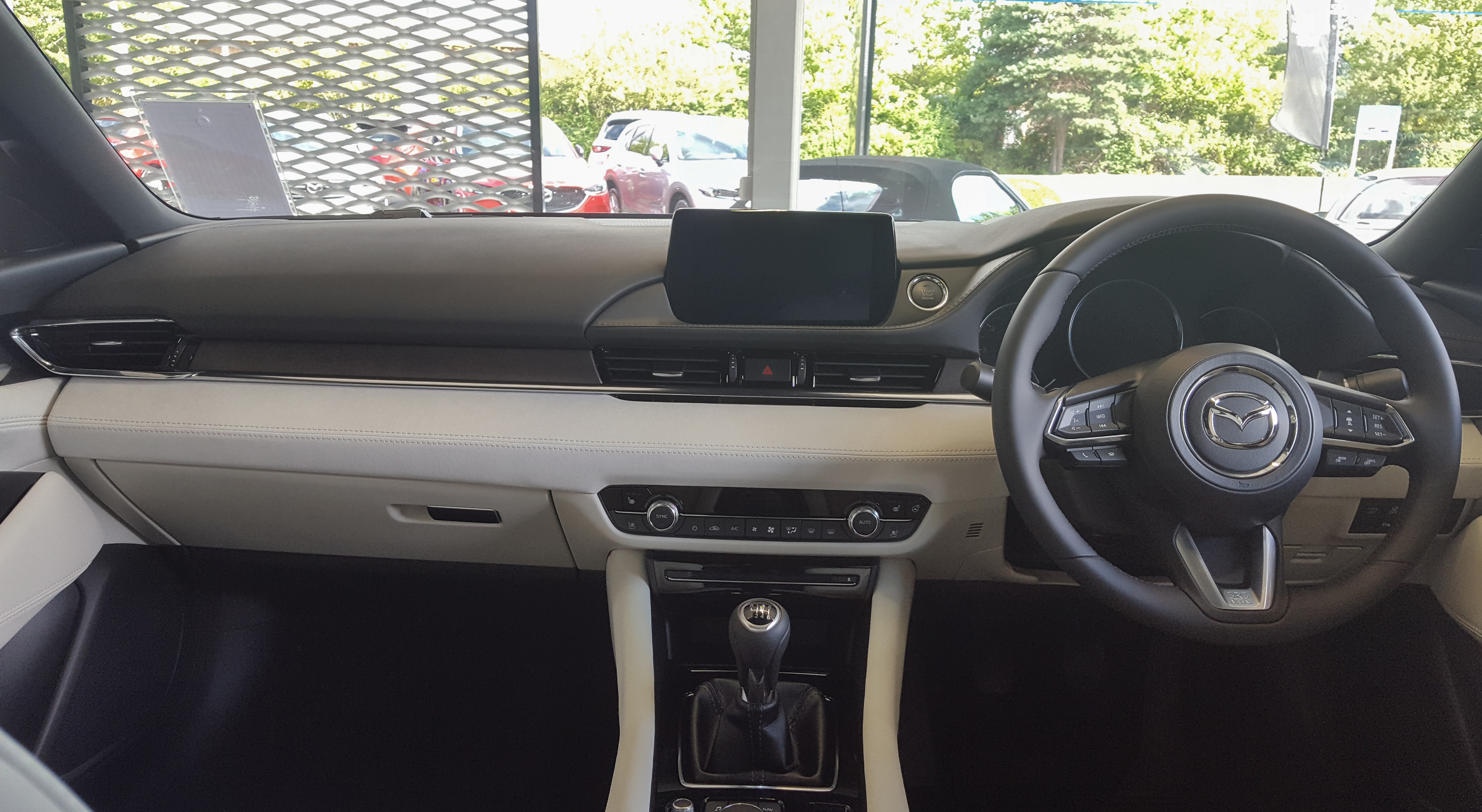
Second facelift

The term "facelift", which is also sometimes known as a "minor change", "minor update", or "refresh" by car manufacturers, describes a minimum change to a model which normally also coincides with a model year change.

While the word "facelift" is a generic term used across the industry, manufacturers may each have their own phrase to describe a facelifted model. BMW uses the acronym LCI ("Life Cycle Impulse") to denote a facelift. Other marques may directly call a particular car a facelift model, while some simply call it a new model. In automotive parlance, "new" usually refers to a facelifted model, whilst the term "all-new" denotes an entirely new generation with not only a design overhaul, but new underpinnings as well.

Holden and Ford Australia implemented a strategy in their automotive design, involving substantial stylistic alterations while retaining the overall generation and platform of the vehicles. Some instances include the fourth generation Holden Commodore, which comprises the VE and VF, as well as the seventh generation Ford Falcon, represented by the FG and FG X. Although these models belong to the same generation, they represented different iterations. Despite essentially being facelifts of one another, these iterations have undergone subtle aesthetic enhancements, commonly referred to as "Series II" revisions.

"Mid-cycle facelifts for cars are usually just cosmetic: a little nip here, a little tuck there, new lights and maybe a couple of different trim pieces to maintain interest in an aging vehicle for an extra couple of years before a full redesign."

— Laurance Yap, editor of Canadian Driver

== Examples ==
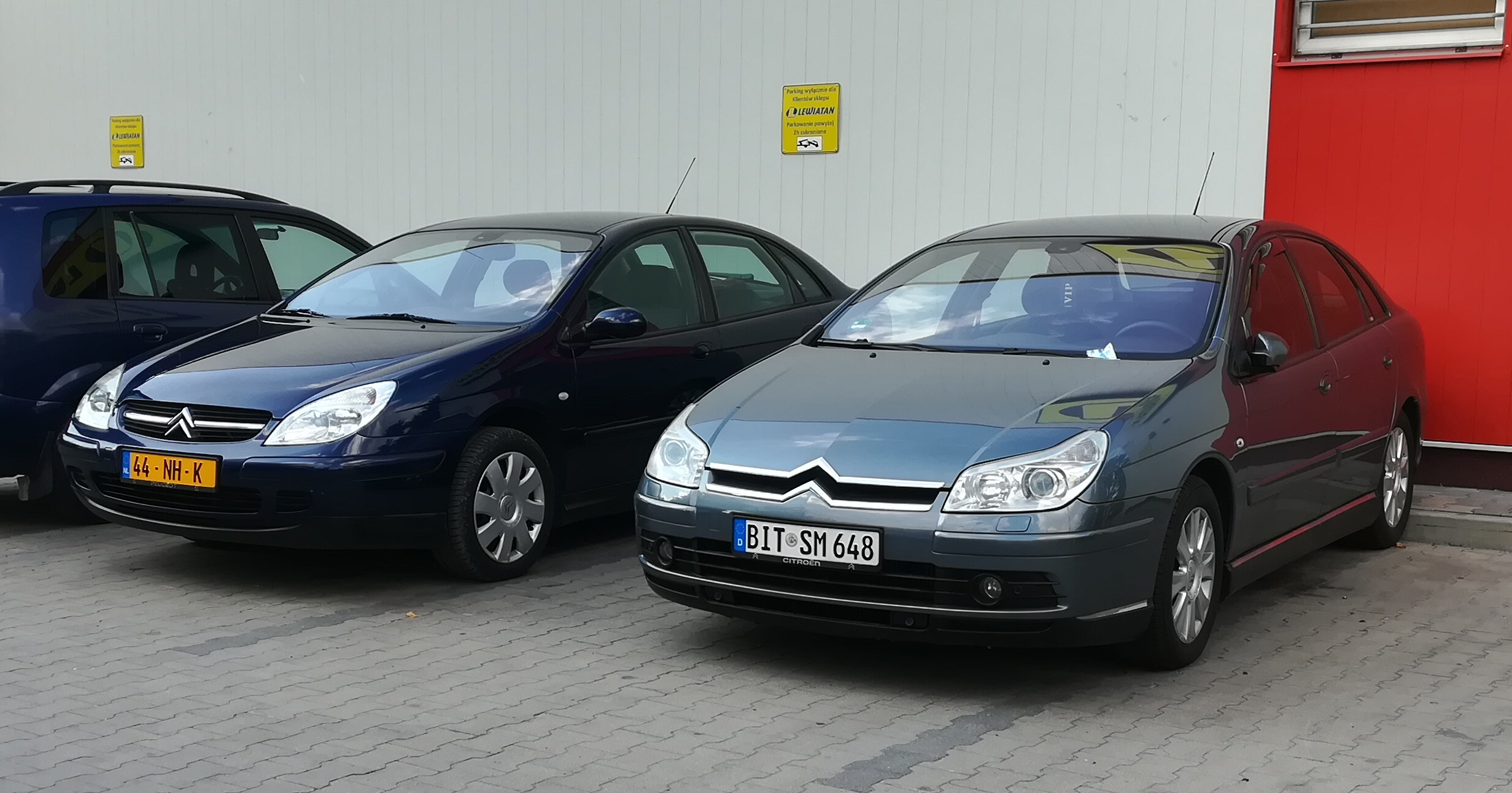
First-generation Citroën C5 pre-facelift (left) and facelift (right)

A facelift may include a change to the vehicle's name; such was the case when Ford renamed their Five Hundred model to be their Ford Taurus in 2008. The facelifts of the Citroën DS3, DS4 and DS5 even changed the brand under which these models were marketed from Citroën to DS.

Models with longer lifespans (10 or more years) may undergo multiple facelifts. Examples include the third-generation Mazda6, which has been on sale since December 2012 and has since gained two major facelifts in 2016 and 2018, both of which included significant interior revisions.

== See also ==
- Automotive design
