= Mazda Shinari =

Concept car produced by Mazda

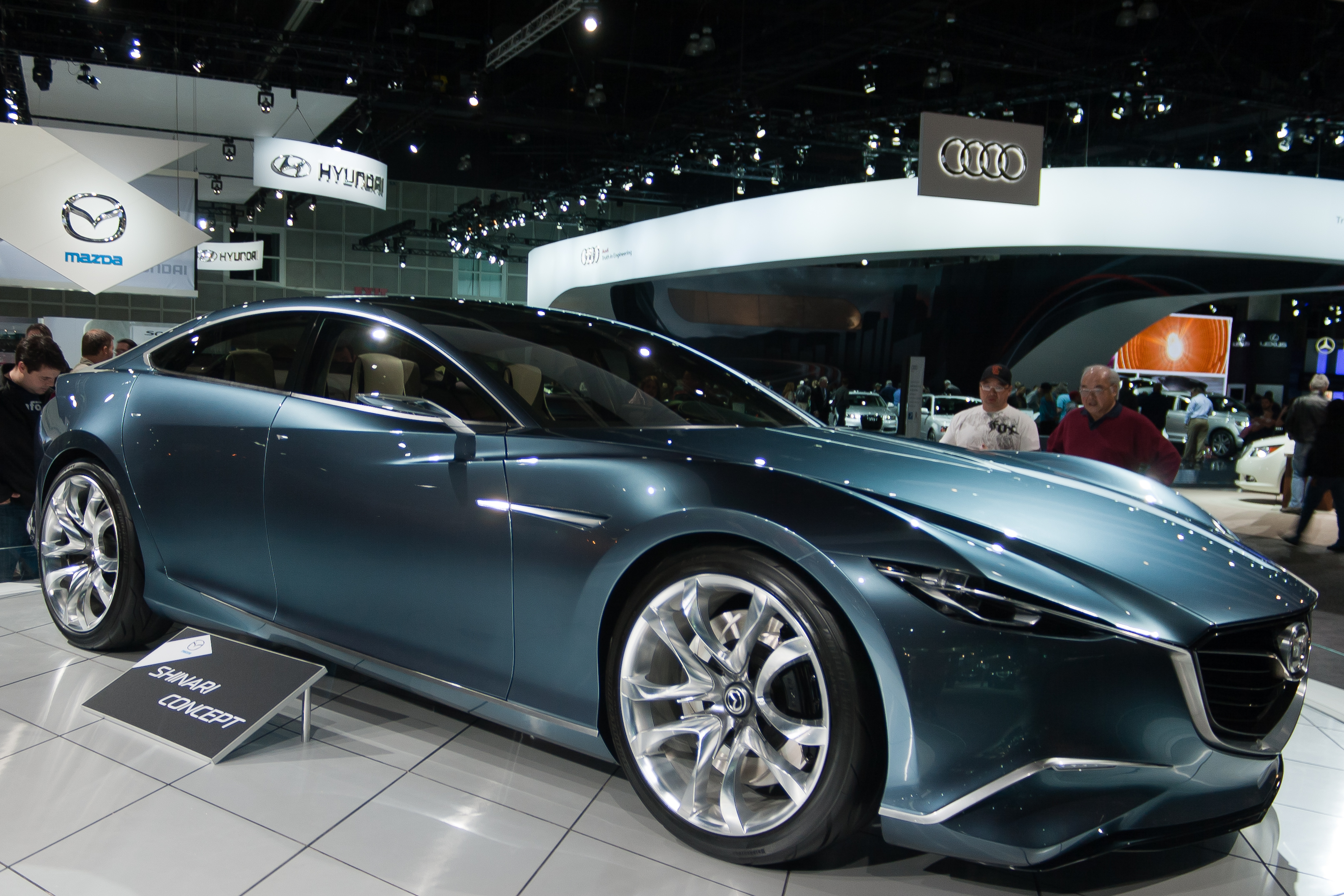

Overview
- Manufacturer: Mazda
- Production: 2010
- Designer: Ikuo Maeda

Body and chassis
- Class: Concept car
- Body style: 4-door sedan
- Layout: Front-engine, front-wheel-drive
- Platform: Skyactiv-Body
- Related: Mazda6 (GJ)

Powertrain
- Engine: 2.0 L Skyactiv-G PE-VPS I4 (gasoline); 2.2 L Skyactiv-D SH-VPTS I4 (diesel)
- Transmission: 6-speed Skyactiv-Drive automatic

Chronology
- Successor: Mazda Takeri

The Mazda Shinari is a concept car produced by the Japanese car manufacturer Mazda, presented at the LA Auto Show in 2010.

It comes in the form of a four-door coupé and its name which indicates the momentum or the start of the movement for a person or an animal, thus its slender design, resulting from a collaboration between Japanese, American and European offices is signed by Yong Wook Cho, it was the first concept car to adopt the "Kodo" style "the soul of the movement" from Mazda.

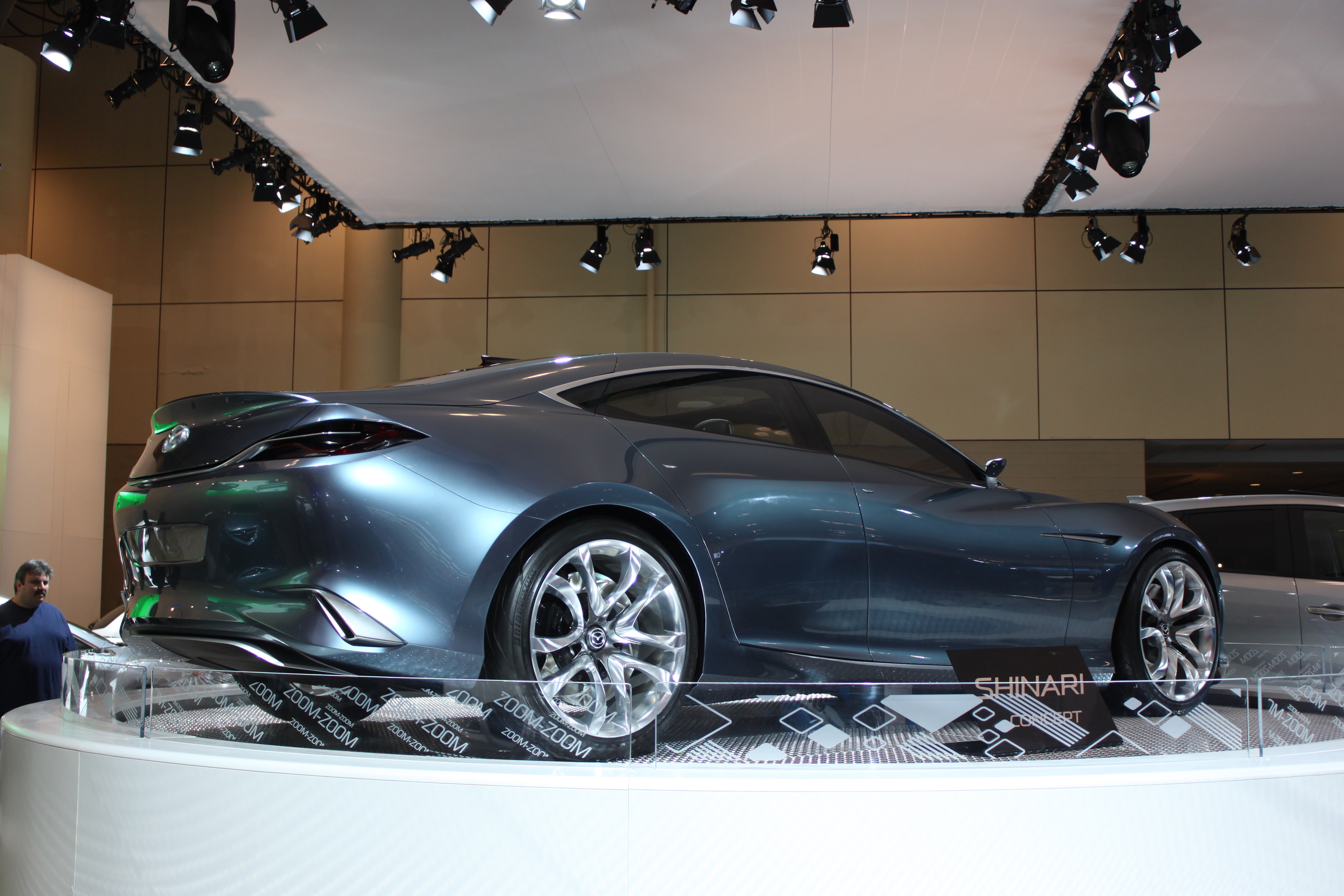
Rear view

The presence of many elements of standard cars such as seat belts or the position of left hand drive led to speculation about the marketing of a model standard for America and Europe such as a new Mazda6.
