= Mazda6 (third generation) =

Third generation of Mazda6

Mazda6 (GJ1/GL)
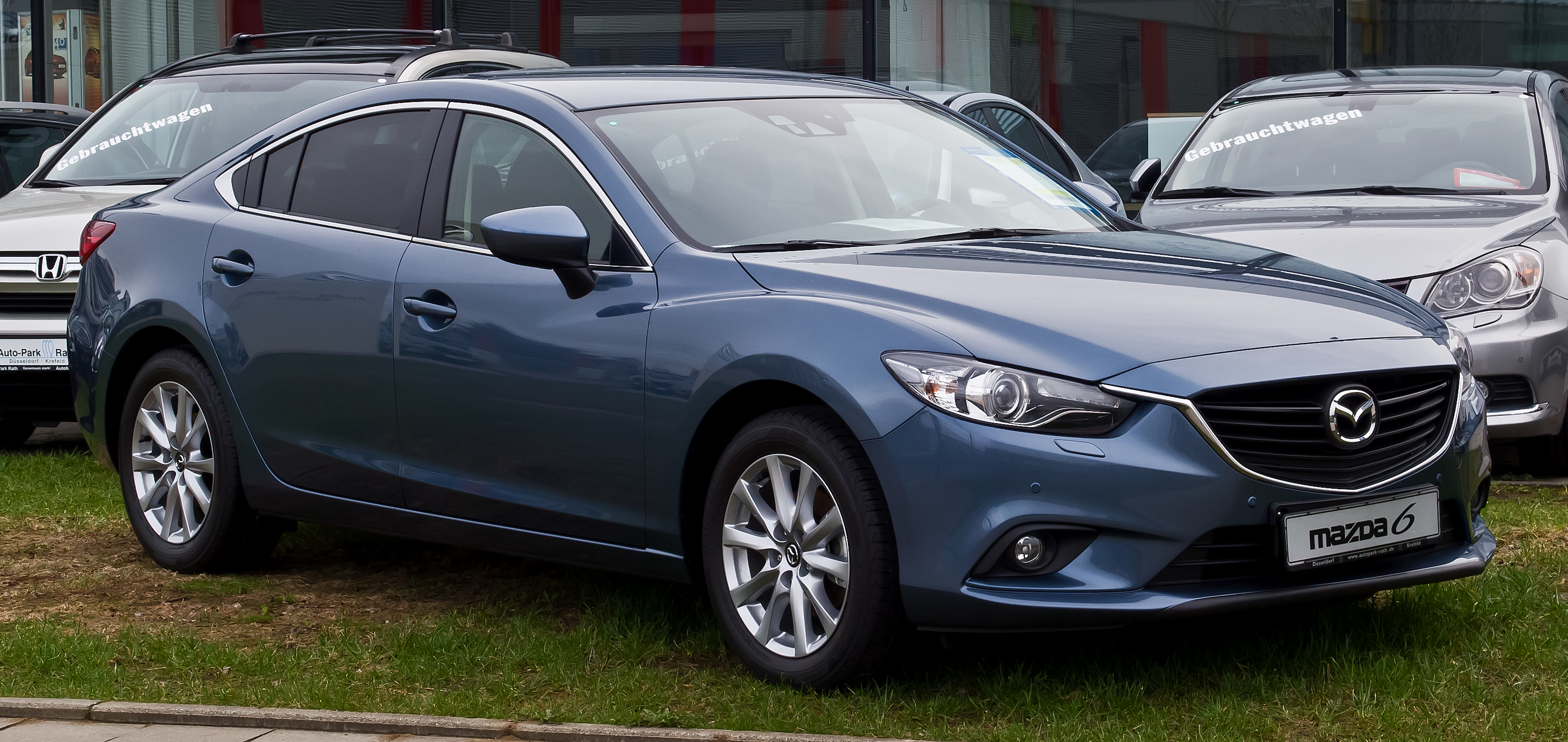
- Pre-facelift

Overview
- Manufacturer: Mazda
- Model code: GJ1 / GL
- Also called: Mazda Atenza (2012–2019, Japan and China)
- Production: November 2012 – December 2024; April 2013 – April 2022 (Russia); May 2014 – December 2023 (China)
- Model years: 2014–2021 (North America); 2014–2025 (Saudi Arabia)
- Assembly: Japan: Hofu/Hiroshima; China: Changchun (FAW Group); Russia: Vladivostok (Sollers JSC); Vietnam: Chu Lai, Quảng Nam (THACO Auto)
- Designer: Akira Tamatani (2010)

Body and chassis
- Body style: 4-door sedan; 5-door wagon
- Layout: Front-engine, front-wheel-drive; Front-engine, all-wheel-drive
- Related: Mazda3; Mazda CX-5; Mazda CX-9

Powertrain
- Engine: Gasoline: 2.0 L Skyactiv-G PE-VPS I4; 2.5 L Skyactiv-G PY-VPS I4; 2.5 L Skyactiv-G PY-VPTS turbo I4; Diesel: 2.2 L Skyactiv-D SH-VPTS I4
- Transmission: 6-speed Skyactiv-Drive automatic; 6-speed Skyactiv-MT manual

Dimensions
- Wheelbase: 2,830 mm (111.4 in) (sedan); 2,750 mm (108.3 in) (wagon)
- Length: 4,865–4,870 mm (191.5–191.7 in) (sedan); 4,805 mm (189.2 in) (wagon)
- Width: 1,840 mm (72.4 in)
- Height: 1,450 mm (57.1 in) (sedan); 1,480 mm (58.3 in) (wagon)

Chronology
- Predecessor: Mazda6 (GH1/GH2)
- Successor: Mazda 6e/EZ-6 (China, Europe, Australia)

The Mazda6 (GJ/GL) is the third and currently final generation of the Mazda6. The sedan was unveiled during Moscow International Automobile Salon on 29 August 2012, and the station wagon version followed during the 2012 Paris Motor Show in the following month. In this generation, there are only 4-door sedan and 5-door station wagon versions available.

== Overview ==
The design was previewed by both the Takeri concept, unveiled at the 2011 Tokyo Motor Show, and the Shinari concept from 2010.

Its design has been extremely well-received, and was a finalist in the 2013 "World Car Design of the Year".

In July 2019, the "Atenza" nameplate was retired in favor of the Mazda6 moniker in the Japanese domestic market as part of Mazda's new global naming structure.

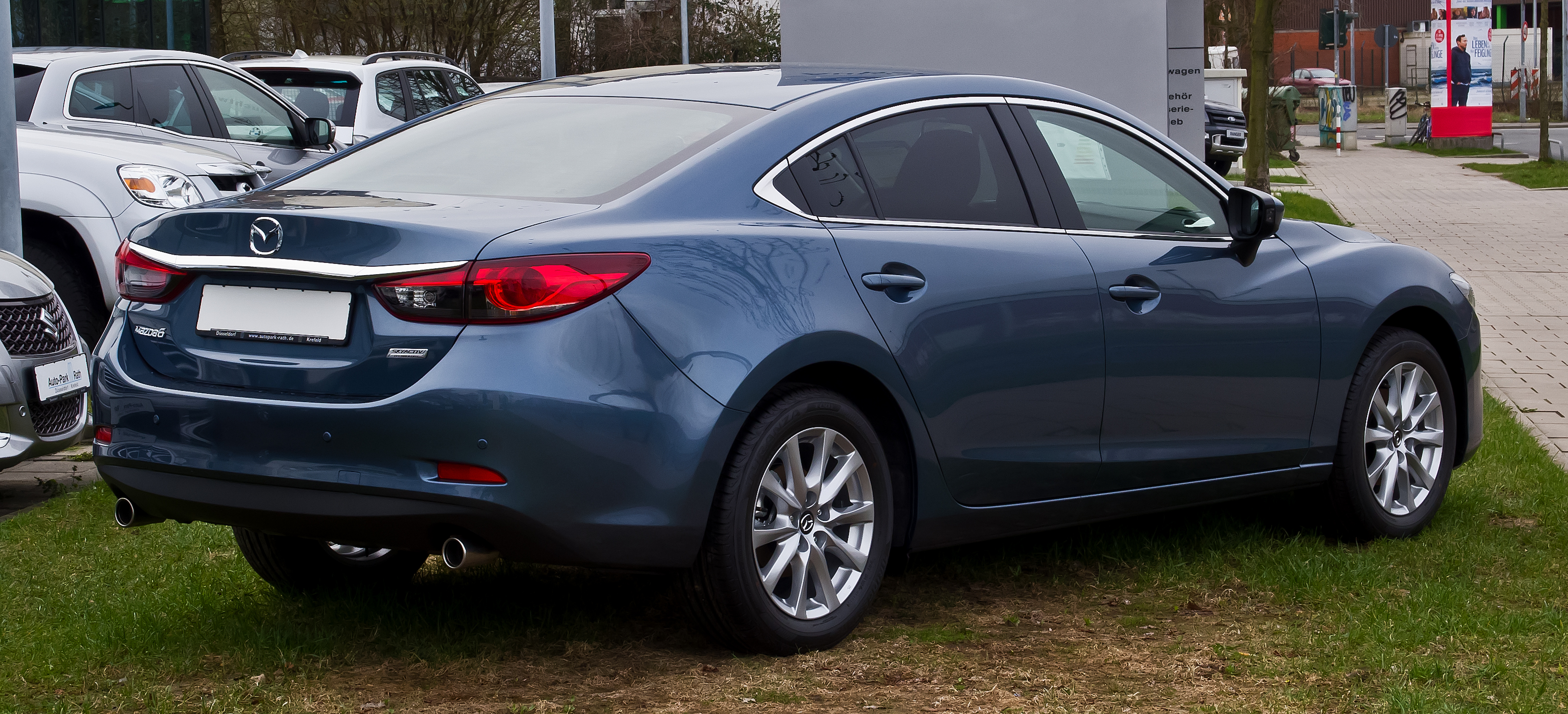
Sedan (pre-facelift)

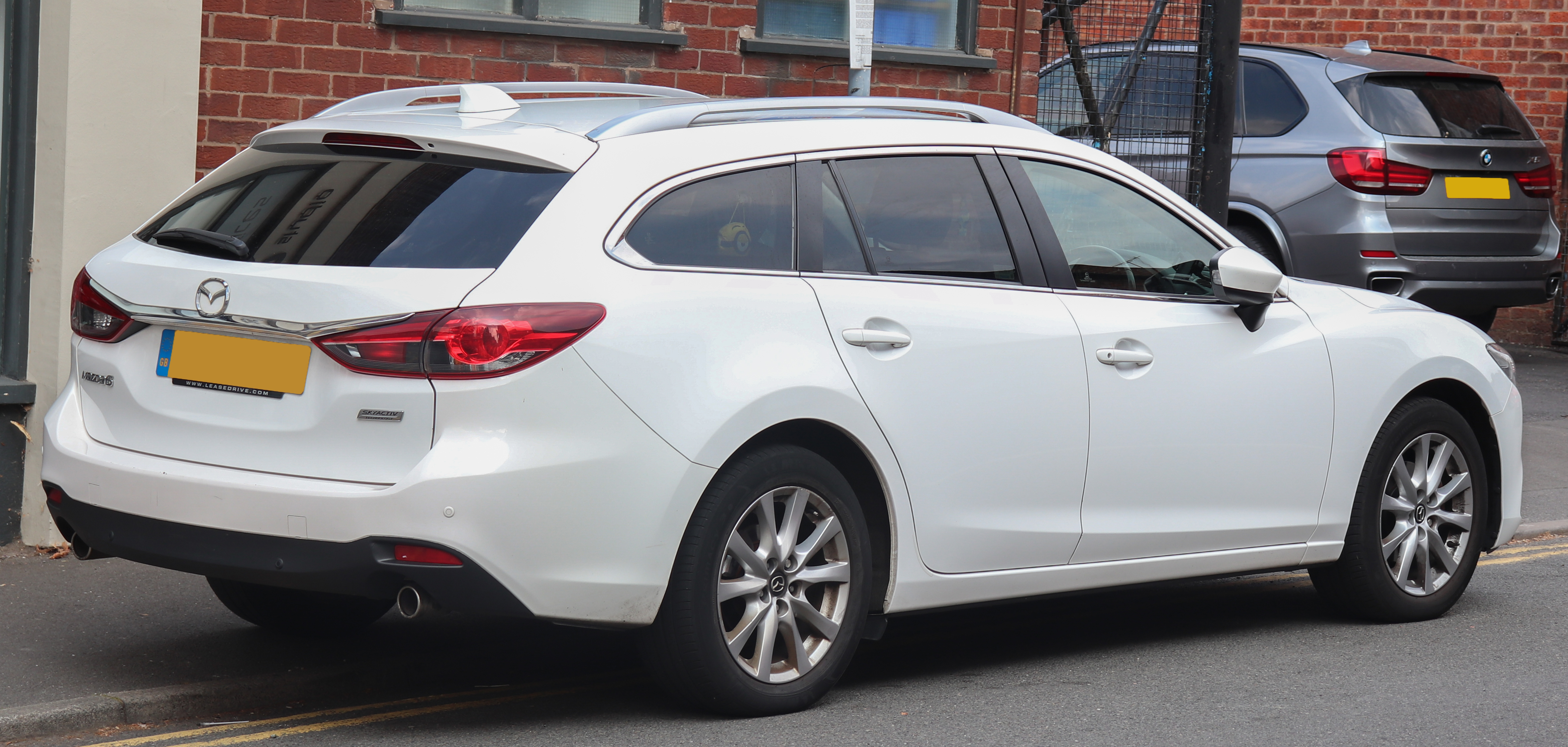
Estate/station wagon (pre-facelift)

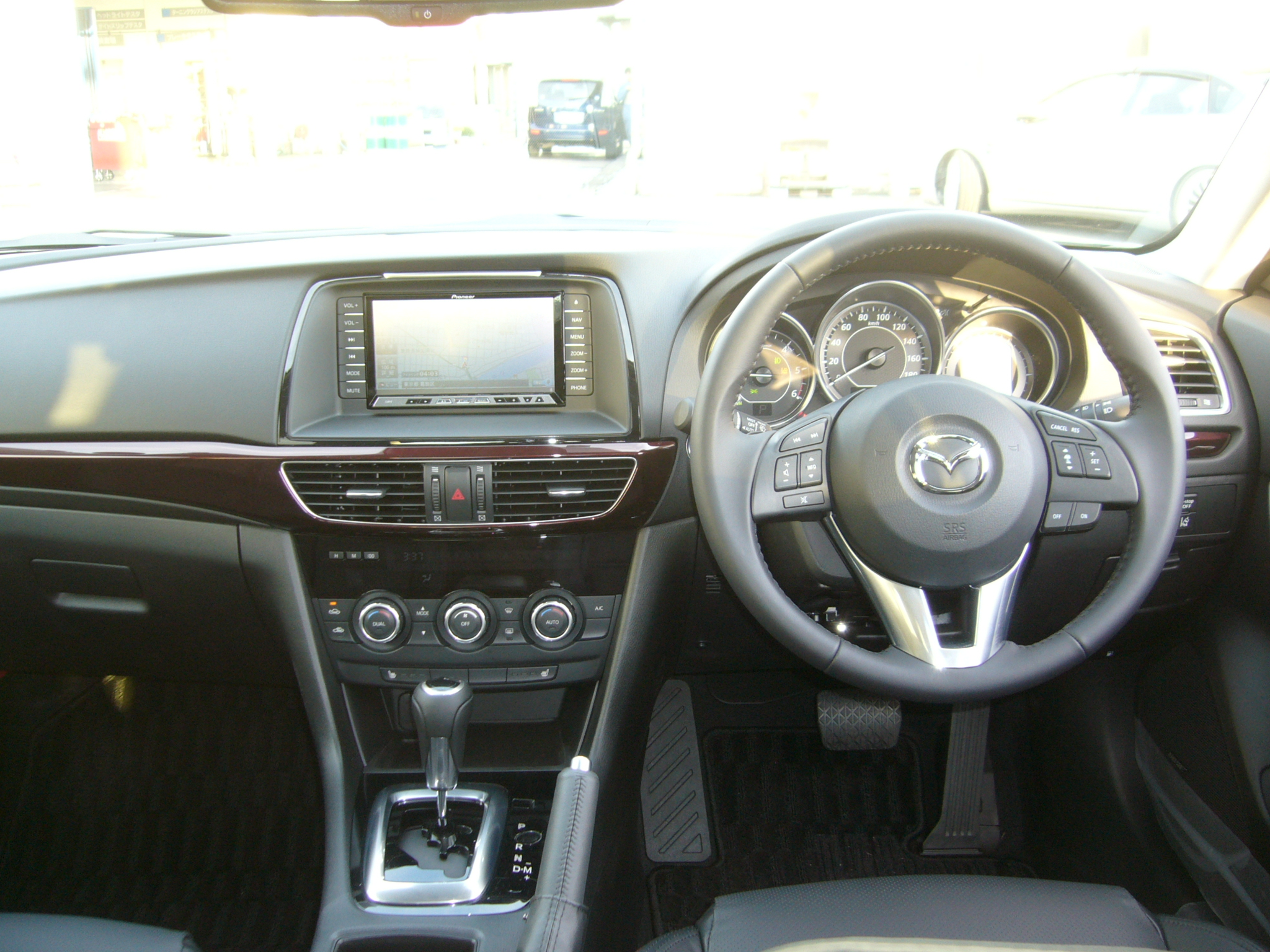
Interior (pre-facelift)

== Markets ==
=== Asia ===
The Japanese-market Mazda Atenza went on sale from 1 November 2012. Early models included the 20S (sedan/wagon), 25S (sedan/wagon), XD (sedan/wagon), and XD L-package (sedan/wagon). Production for the domestic market ended in April 2024, although the Mazda6 continues to be exported to other markets such as the Middle East and Australia.

For 2014, new features included SCBS (smart city brake support) as standard equipment in the Atenza 20S and XD, increased efficiency for Skyactiv-G 2.5 engine models to 16.0 km/L (6.3 L/100 km; 45 mpg_{‑imp}; 38 mpg_{‑US}) (JC08 mode), new slide glass sunroof option for Skyactiv-D 2.2 engine models, addition of XD L-package (6-speed manual transmission, leather seats), Bose 11-speaker sound system with Centerpoint 2 surround sound become standard in XD L-package models, and addition of deep crystal blue mica body color to total of seven body color options.

In China, the third generation was sold under the Atenza nameplate, to differentiate it from the first generation Mazda6 which was still being produced in China.

In the Philippines, under Mazda's local distributor Berjaya Auto Philippines, the third generation Mazda6 sedan went on-sale by the end of 2013 as a 2014 model year. It was followed by a 5-door station wagon variant, the Mazda6 Sports Wagon in late 2014 for the 2015 model year (with a diesel engine variant later on for 2016 to 2018). In October 2018, Mazda Philippines launched the facelifted Mazda6 sedan and wagon (with both diesel and gasoline variants) during the 7th Philippine International Motor Show.

2014 Tokyo Auto Salon concepts (2014)

The 2014 Atenza Sedan design concept was a Mazda Atenza Sedan with Skyactiv-D engine, Skyactiv-MT 6-speed transmission, original aero parts, Brembo brake calipers, Soul red body color, aluminum wheels, semi-bucket seats, and Alcantara interior upholstery.

The 2014 Atenza Wagon design concept was a Mazda Atenza Wagon with Skyactiv-D engine, Skyactiv-MT 6-speed transmission, metal-decorated instrument panel, dashboard with leather upholstery and stitching, and metal decoration at trunk board.

The vehicles were unveiled at the 2014 Tokyo Auto Salon.

=== Australia and New Zealand ===
In Australia and New Zealand, the Mazda6 is sold with a 2.5L Skyactiv-G gasoline four-cylinder engine producing 138 kW (185 hp; 188 PS) and 250 N⋅m (184 lb⋅ft), a turbocharged 2.5L Skyactiv-G gasoline four-cylinder engine producing 170 kW (228 hp; 231 PS) and 420 N⋅m (310 lbf⋅ft), or a 2.2L Skyactiv-D twin-turbo diesel four-cylinder engine producing 129 kW (173 hp; 175 PS) and 420 N⋅m (310 lb⋅ft).

The 5-door hatchback version of the first and second generation models is no longer available, in favour of sedan and wagon versions (both available in Sport, Touring, GT SP and Atenza trim).

The only available transmission is Mazda's 6-speed Skyactiv-Drive automatic. Notably, Mazda's Skyactiv technologies have reduced the gasoline model's fuel consumption from an official figure of 8.9 L/100 km (26.4 mpg_{‑US}) (5-speed auto) for the previous generation to 7 L/100 km (40.4 mpg_{‑imp}; 33.6 mpg_{‑US}), a 27% improvement.

The diesel's fuel economy gain was less marked, from 5.9 L/100 km (47.9 mpg_{‑imp}; 39.9 mpg_{‑US}) for the previous manual transmission-only diesel model to 5.4 L/100 km (52.3 mpg_{‑imp}; 43.6 mpg_{‑US}) for the new automatic-only offering.

=== Europe ===
Germany is one of the European countries where the 6 was offered with all-wheel drive. Russian production of the Mazda 6 had ended in April 2022 due to the Russian invasion of Ukraine.

=== North America ===
The third-generation, 2014 Mazda6 was unveiled at the 2012 Los Angeles Auto Show. North American models with the Skyactiv-G 2.5-liter gasoline engine went on sale in January 2013; a V6 engine was no longer offered. US and Canadian models with the Skyactiv-D diesel engine available in Europe and Asia were originally planned for the second half of 2013, but that was delayed due to emissions issues. In 2014, the diesel engine was delayed again, effectively cancelling the program.

The 2.5 L produced 184 hp (187 PS; 137 kW) and US EPA fuel economy ratings of 26 mpg_{‑US} (9.0 L/100 km; 31 mpg_{‑imp}) City and 37 mpg_{‑US} (6.4 L/100 km; 44 mpg_{‑imp}) Highway (with the 6-speed automatic). In the United States, the Mazda6 was available only as a four-door sedan in three trims: Sport; Touring, and Grand Touring. Standard equipment included:

- Bluetooth hands-free telephone system with A2DP stereo streaming capabilities, on all models except the Sport with the 6-speed manual
- 17-inch aluminum-alloy wheels
- Keyless entry with keyless access and push-button start system

The Sport and Touring trims were offered with the choice of either a 6-speed manual or 6-speed automatic transmission, while the top-of-the-line Grand Touring was available only with the automatic. In Canada, GX, GS and GT trim levels were offered; all had the manual transmission as standard equipment.

The Grand Touring model with Technology Package and Advanced Package added features such as radar cruise control, forward obstruction warning, lane departure warning, and automatic high beam control. For 2016, the Grand Touring introduced LED headlamps in lieu of the previous bi-xenon HIDs, new LED daytime running lights, and LED fog lights. The 2016 Grand Touring with Technology Package also introduced Smart Brake Support (SBS)—different from Smart City Brake Support (SCBS); the two systems perform different functions at different speed ranges.

The 2015 Mazda6 was named a Top Safety Pick Plus by the IIHS when equipped with available Smart City Brake Support. It was also named as a 2015 Car and Driver 10 Best pick, a "rare car that looks like it drives and drives like it looks."

Mazda discontinued the Mazda6 in North America after the 2021 model year. They cited shifting consumer preferences to larger crossover SUVs, adding that the similarly priced CX-5 outsells the Mazda6 by a margin of 9-to-1.

==== i-ELOOP ====
The North American 2014 Mazda6 Grand Touring trim with Technology Package introduced the Mazda i-ELOOP (intelligent-Energy Loop) technology. i-ELOOP is a regenerative engine braking system that uses the free wheeling alternator to capture energy when coasting.

The captured energy is stored in a capacitor, and that stored energy is then used to power the car's electrical components—from the AC to the power steering—and in turn, improves real–world fuel efficiency by as much as 5 percent. The i-ELOOP equipped cars, which also use active grille shutters at highway speeds, claim an EPA mileage rating of 28 mpg_{‑US} (8.4 L/100 km; 34 mpg_{‑imp}) City/40 mpg_{‑US} (5.9 L/100 km; 48 mpg_{‑imp}) Highway, 2 mpg better EPA mileage ratings than the standard gasoline engine Mazda6 with 26/38. The capacitor can store in seconds enough energy to run the car electronics for several minutes. The capacitor system offers large weight and space savings over batteries. i-ELOOP also achieves better gas mileage by disengaging the alternator during acceleration.

== Facelifts ==
=== 2015 ===
The first facelift made its European debut at the 2015 Geneva Motor Show, following its global debut at the 2014 Los Angeles Auto Show.

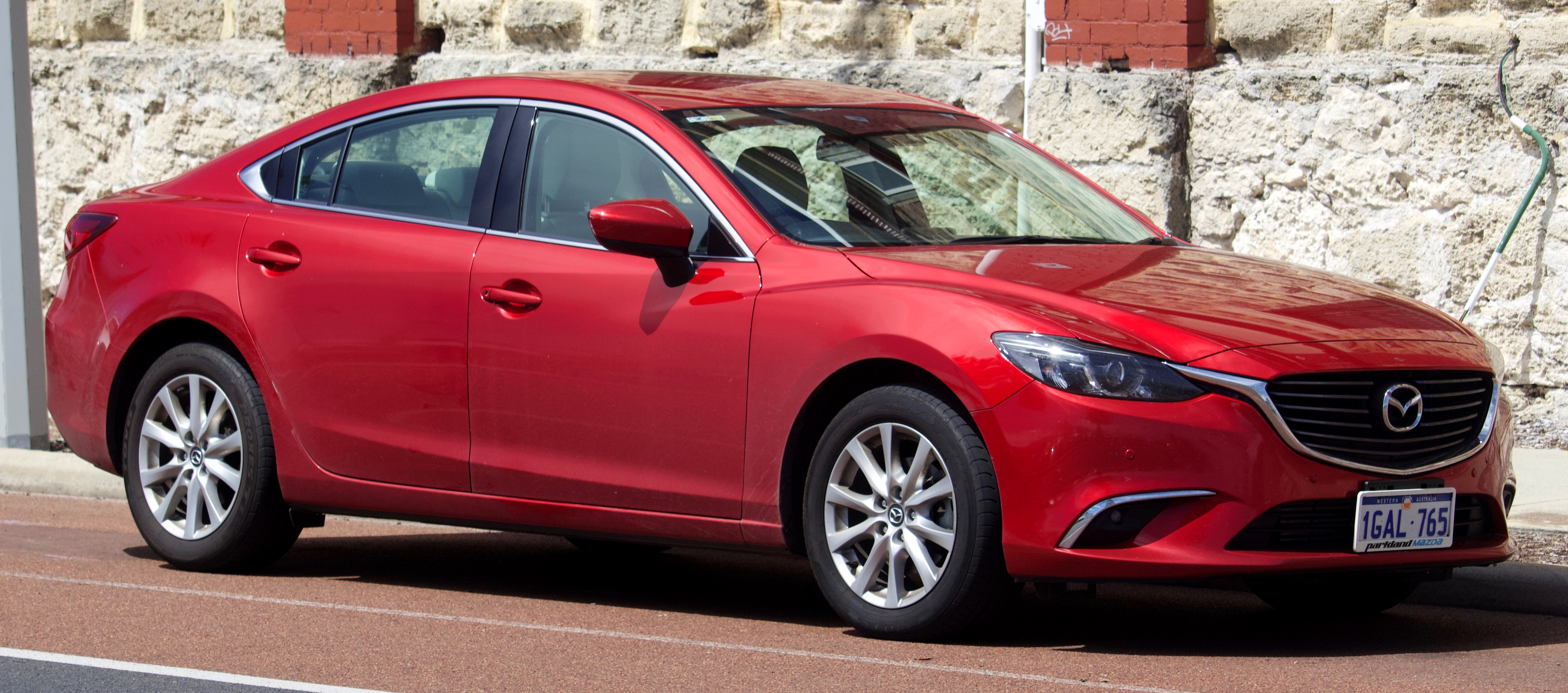
Sedan (2015 facelift)

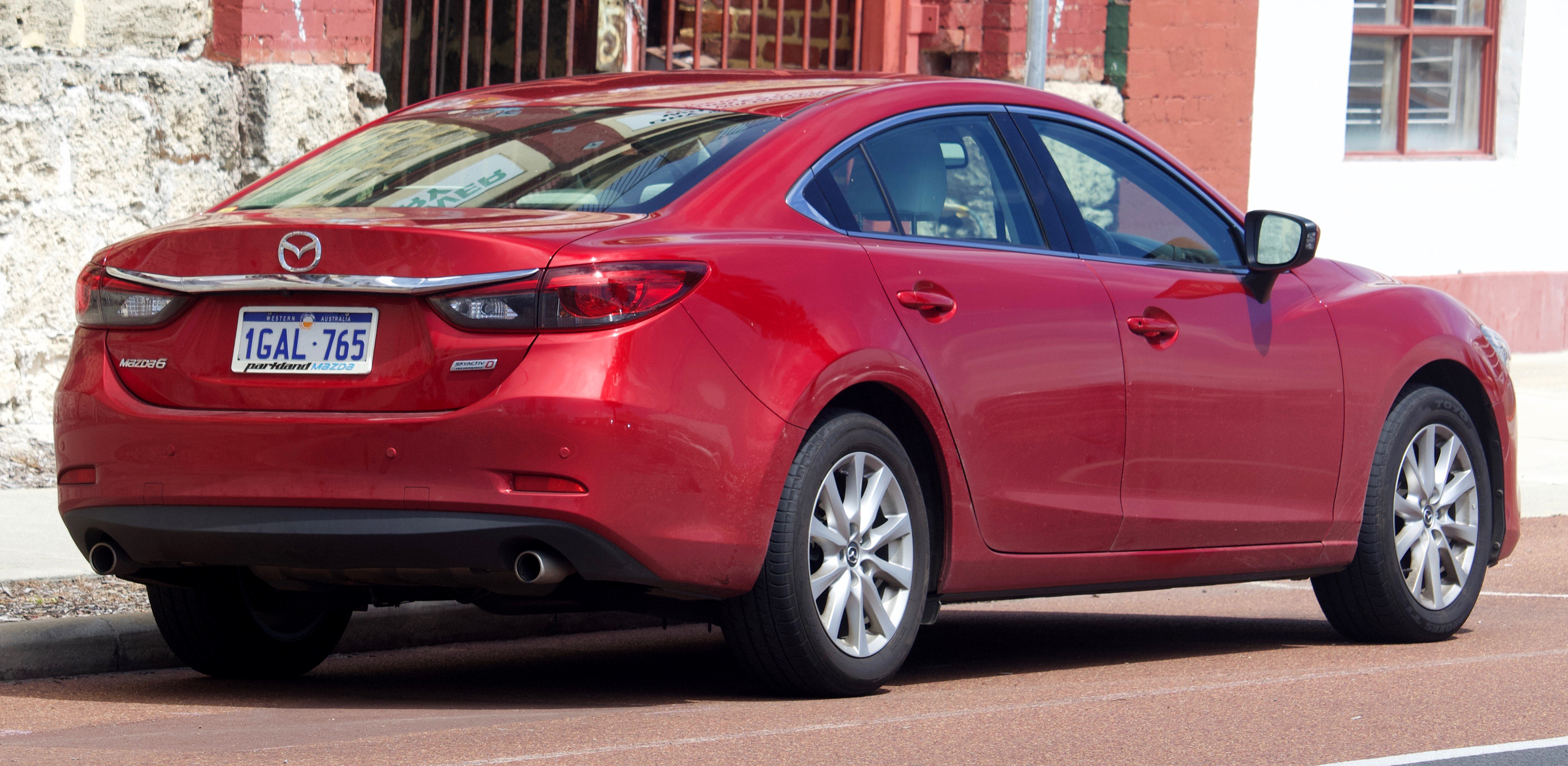
Sedan (2015 facelift)

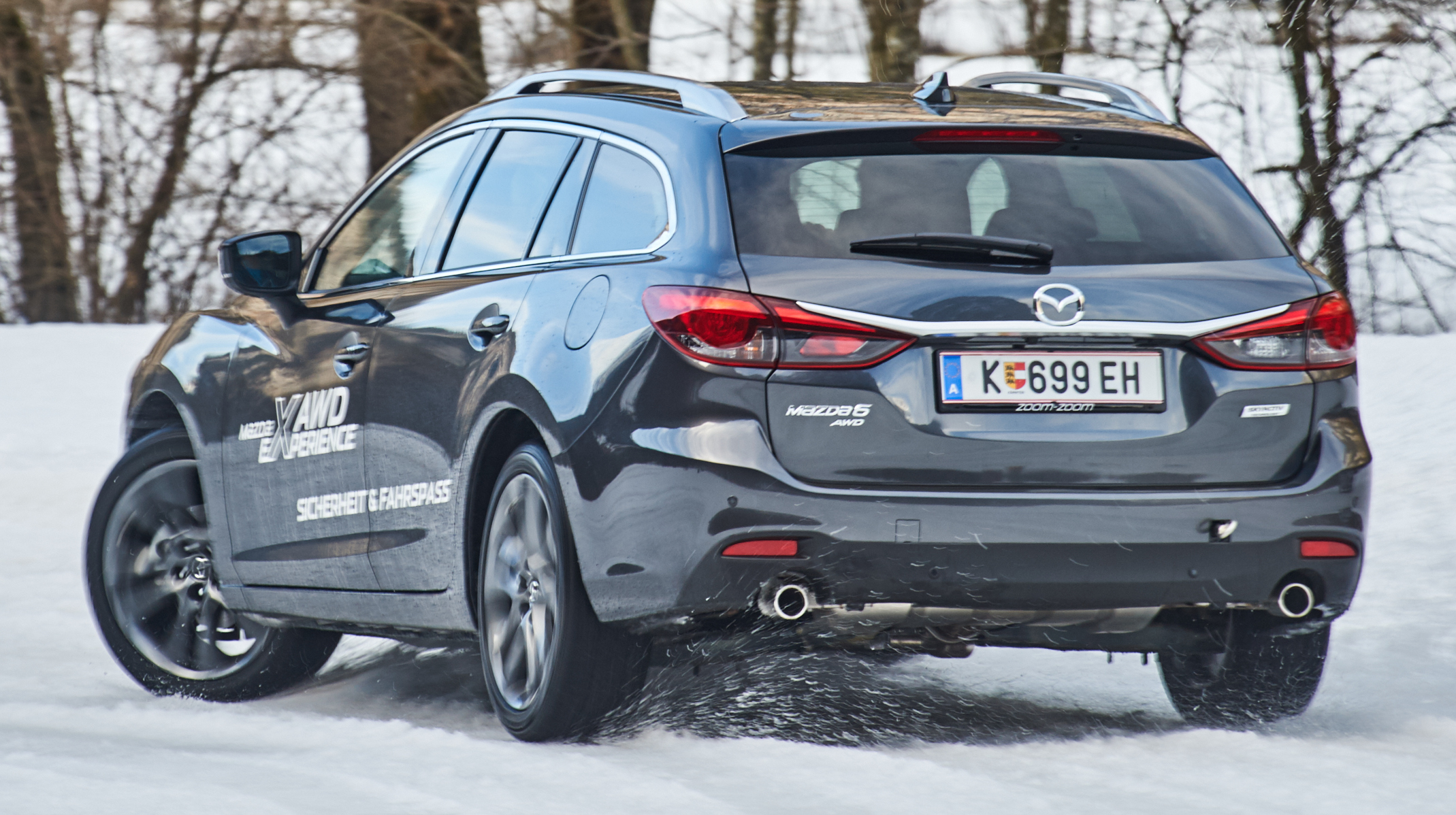
Estate/station wagon (2015 facelift)

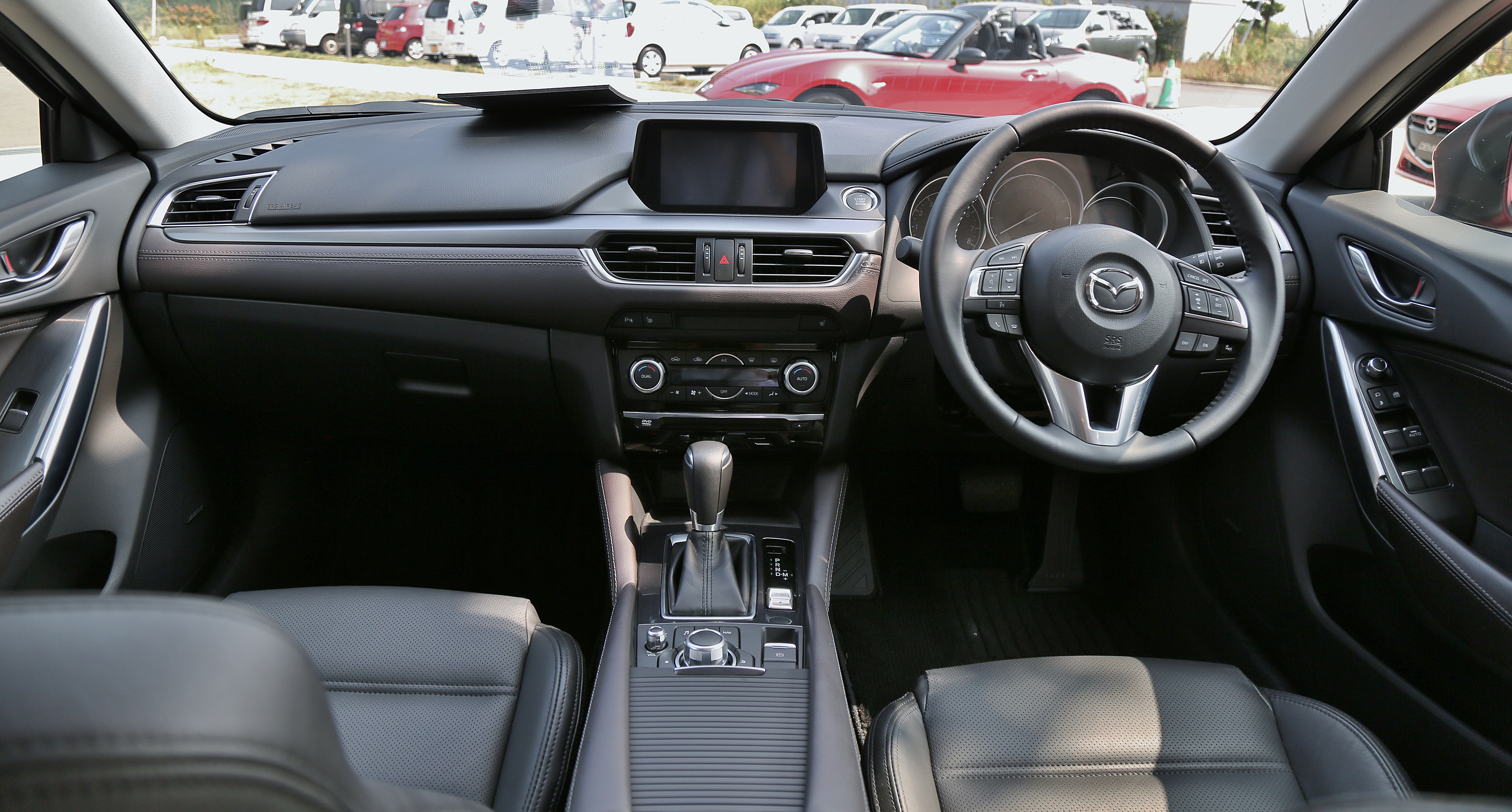
Interior (2015 facelift)

=== 2018 ===
A mid-cycle refresh for the 2018 Mazda6 was unveiled in November 2017 at the Los Angeles Auto Show. Changes to the 2018 Mazda6 include new front and rear fascias, new aluminum-alloy wheel designs, standard i-Activsense driver assistance technologies on all Mazda6 trim levels, new interior fabrics and upholsteries, and two new trim levels, Grand Touring Reserve and Signature. While the base Sport and Touring trims receive the previously-available 187 hp (190 PS; 139 kW), 2.5L Skyactiv I4 gasoline engine, the Grand Touring, Grand Touring Reserve, and Signature trims receive a 2.5-liter Skyactiv turbocharged gasoline inline-four engine that produces 227 hp (230 PS; 169 kW); 250 hp (253 PS; 186 kW) on high octane fuel. A six-speed automatic transmission is standard on all trim levels except the base Sport trim, while a six-speed manual transmission remains available only on the base Sport trim level. As before, the facelifted Mazda6 continues to be produced at Mazda's assembly plant in Hiroshima, Japan.

The 2018 Mazda6 was Mazda's first vehicle to receive both Apple CarPlay and Android Auto. A software update was available for 2018 Mazda6 owners that added these capabilities, and newer Mazda6 models are equipped with these features from the factory.

In some markets, the manual transmission was discontinued for the 2019 model year.

In 2023, the Mazda6 received a minor update. Changes include refining the transmission and engine for the turbo models, a Qi wireless charger in front of the gear selector and wireless compatibility for Apple Carplay.

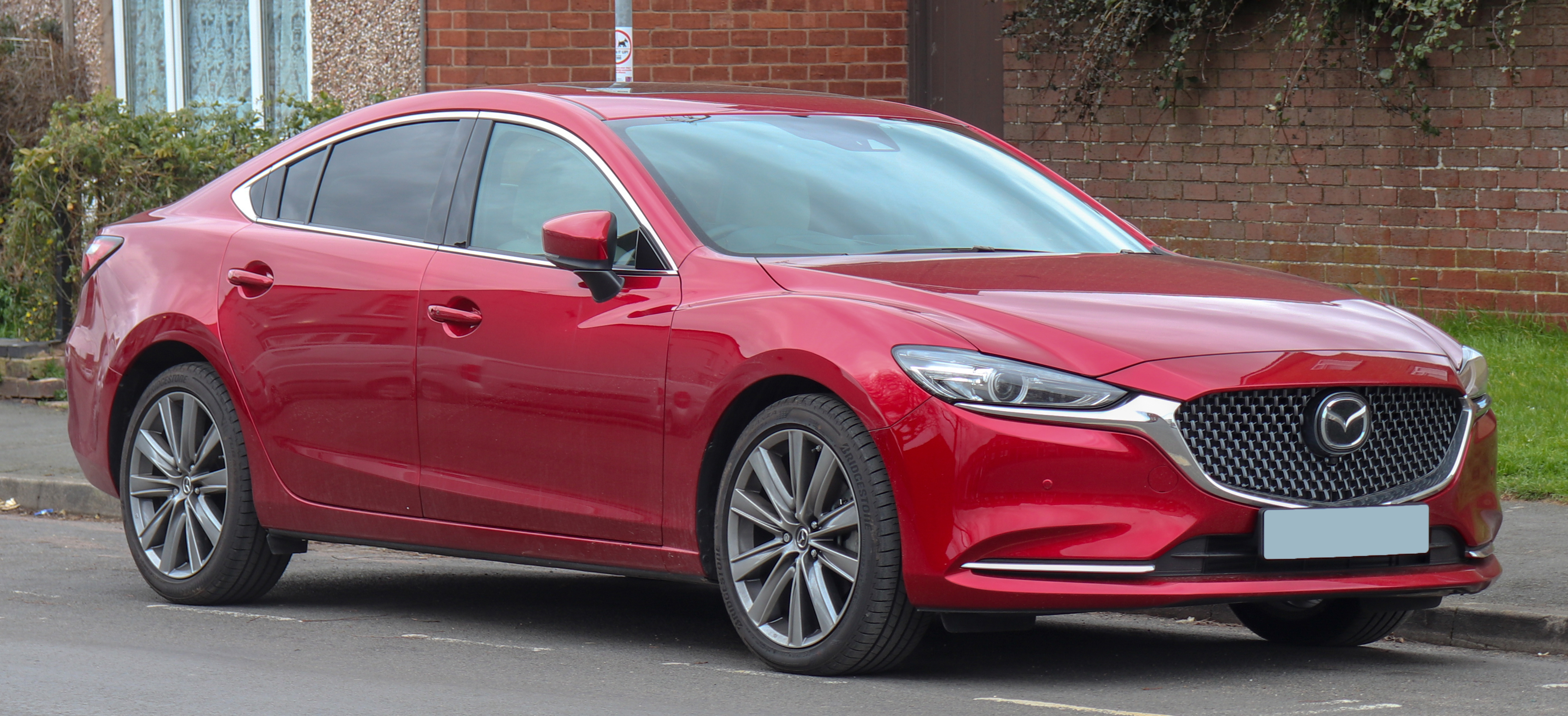
Sedan (2018 facelift)

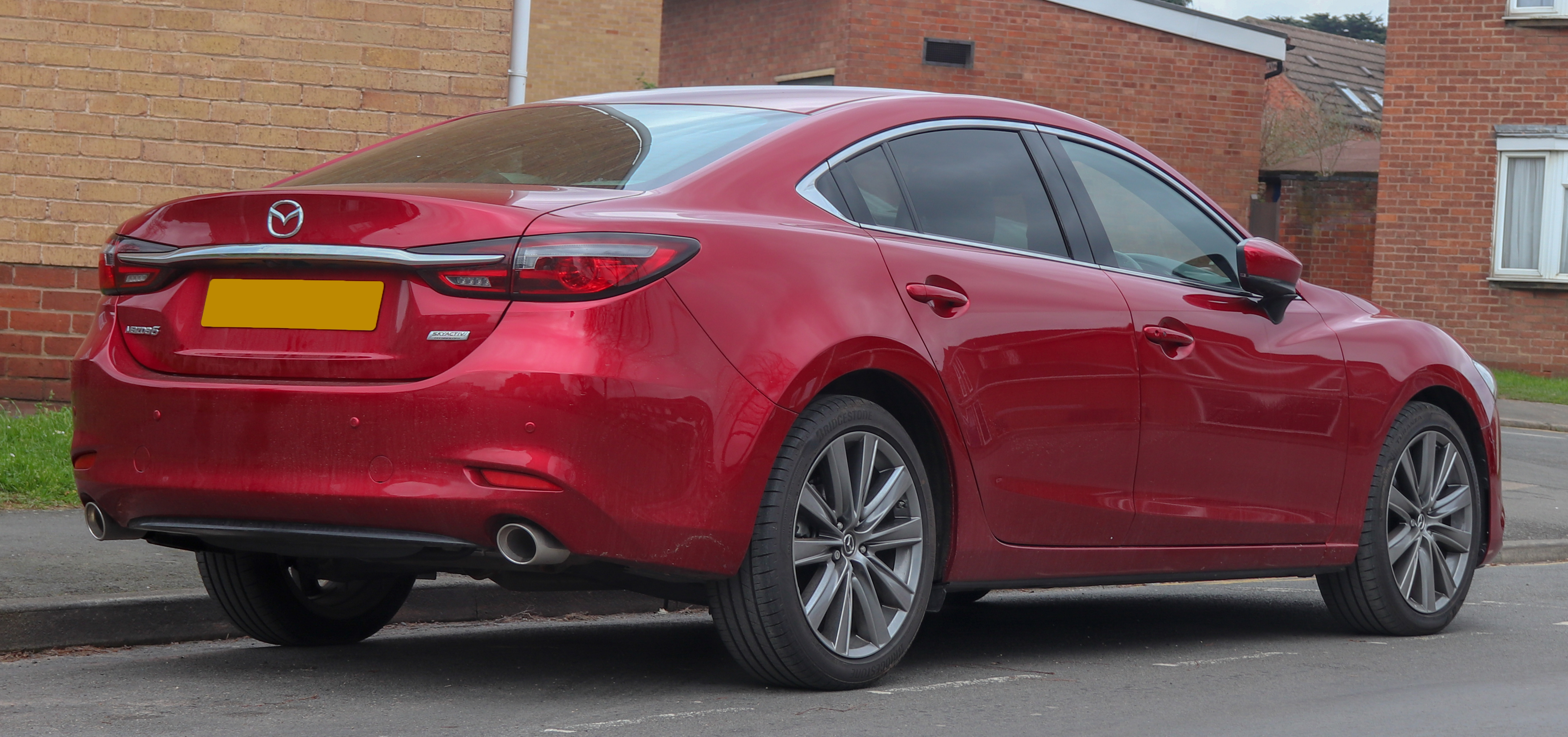
Sedan (2018 facelift)

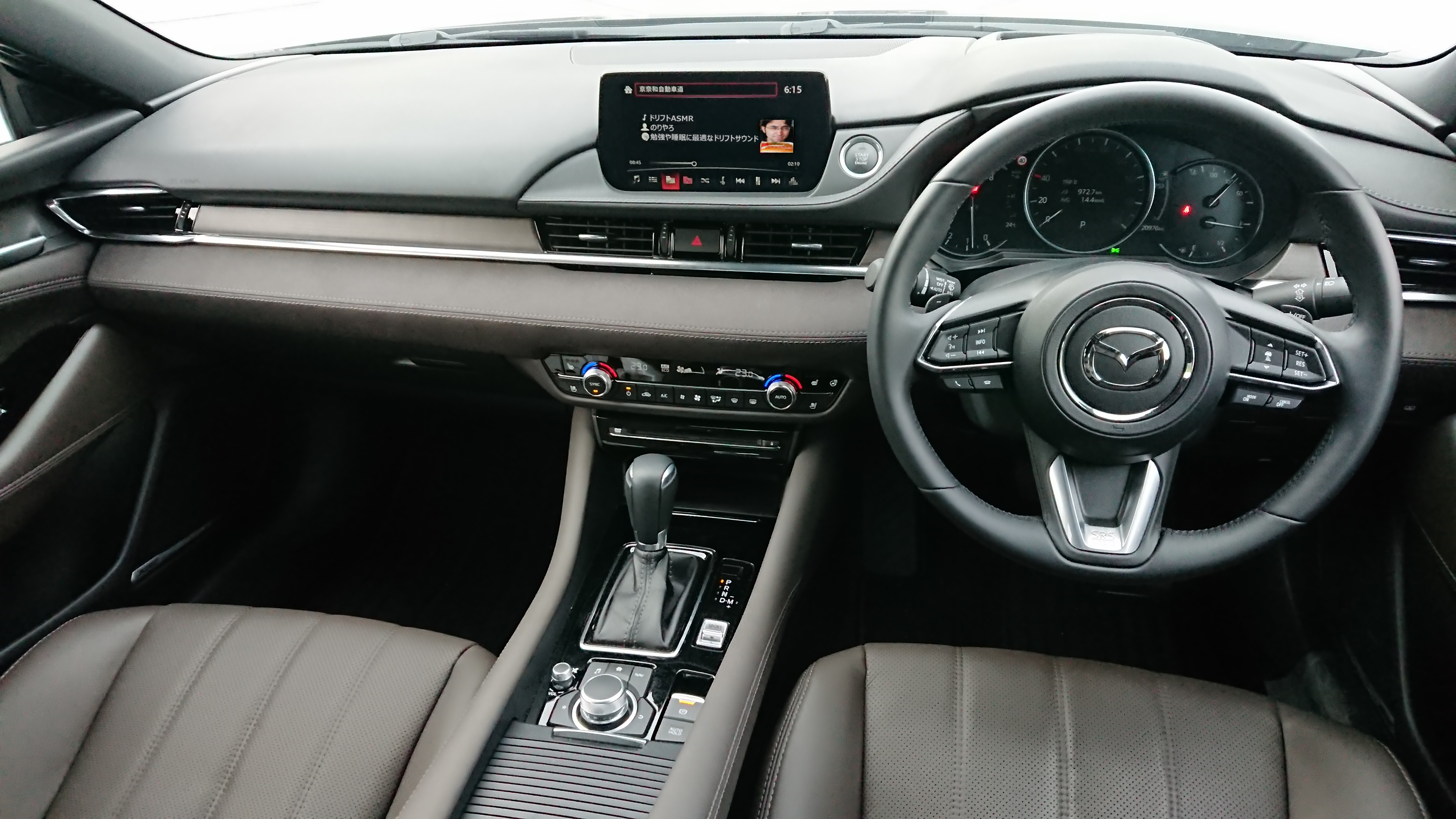
Interior (2018 facelift)

== Powertrain ==
Type	Model	Engine code	Displ.	Power	Torque	Trans.	Layout	Cal. years
Petrol	Skyactiv-G 2.0	PE-VPS	1,997 cc (2.0 L) I4	115 kW (154 hp; 156 PS) @ 6,000 rpm	199 N⋅m (20.3 kg⋅m; 147 lb⋅ft) @ 4,000 rpm	6-speed 6EC-AT automatic	FWD	2012-2025
Petrol	Skyactiv-G 2.0	PE-VPS	1,997 cc (2.0 L) I4	115 kW (154 hp; 156 PS) @ 6,000 rpm	199 N⋅m (20.3 kg⋅m; 147 lb⋅ft) @ 4,000 rpm	6-speed manual	FWD	2012-2021
Petrol	Skyactiv-G 2.5	PY-VPS	2,488 cc (2.5 L) I4	140 kW (188 hp; 190 PS) @ 6,000 rpm	252 N⋅m (25.7 kg⋅m; 186 lb⋅ft) @ 4,000 rpm	6-speed 6EC-AT automatic	FWD	2012-2025
Petrol	Skyactiv-G 2.5	PY-VPS	2,488 cc (2.5 L) I4	140 kW (188 hp; 190 PS) @ 6,000 rpm	252 N⋅m (25.7 kg⋅m; 186 lb⋅ft) @ 4,000 rpm	6-speed manual	FWD	2012-2021
Petrol	Skyactiv-G 2.5	PY-VPTS	2,488 cc (2.5 L) turbo I4	190 kW (255 hp; 258 PS) @ 5,000 rpm (Note: With premium fuel, reduced to 169 kW (227 hp) with regular fuel.)	420 N⋅m (42.8 kg⋅m; 310 lb⋅ft) @ 2,000 rpm	6-speed 6EC-AT automatic	FWD	2018-2025
Diesel	Skyactiv-D 2.2	SH-VPTS	2,191 cc (2.2 L) I4	110 kW (148 hp; 150 PS) @ 4,500 rpm	380 N⋅m (38.7 kg⋅m; 280 lb⋅ft) @ 1.800-2,600 rpm	6-speed 6EC-AT automatic	FWD	2012-2021
Diesel	Skyactiv-D 2.2	SH-VPTS	2,191 cc (2.2 L) I4	110 kW (148 hp; 150 PS) @ 4,500 rpm	380 N⋅m (38.7 kg⋅m; 280 lb⋅ft) @ 1.800-2,600 rpm	6-speed 6EC-AT automatic	AWD	2012-2021
Diesel	Skyactiv-D 2.2	SH-VPTS	2,191 cc (2.2 L) I4	110 kW (148 hp; 150 PS) @ 4,500 rpm	380 N⋅m (38.7 kg⋅m; 280 lb⋅ft) @ 1.800-2,600 rpm	6-speed manual	FWD	2012-2021
Diesel	Skyactiv-D 2.2	SH-VPTS	2,191 cc (2.2 L) I4	110 kW (148 hp; 150 PS) @ 4,500 rpm	380 N⋅m (38.7 kg⋅m; 280 lb⋅ft) @ 1.800-2,600 rpm	6-speed manual	AWD	2012-2021
Diesel	Skyactiv-D 2.2	SH-VPTS	2,191 cc (2.2 L) I4	129 kW (173 hp; 175 PS) @ 4,500 rpm	420 N⋅m (42.8 kg⋅m; 310 lb⋅ft) @ 2,000 rpm	6-speed 6EC-AT automatic	FWD	2012-2023
Diesel	Skyactiv-D 2.2	SH-VPTS	2,191 cc (2.2 L) I4	129 kW (173 hp; 175 PS) @ 4,500 rpm	420 N⋅m (42.8 kg⋅m; 310 lb⋅ft) @ 2,000 rpm	6-speed 6EC-AT automatic	AWD	2012-2023
Diesel	Skyactiv-D 2.2	SH-VPTS	2,191 cc (2.2 L) I4	129 kW (173 hp; 175 PS) @ 4,500 rpm	420 N⋅m (42.8 kg⋅m; 310 lb⋅ft) @ 2,000 rpm	6-speed manual	FWD	2012-2021
Diesel	Skyactiv-D 2.2	SH-VPTS	2,191 cc (2.2 L) I4	129 kW (173 hp; 175 PS) @ 4,500 rpm	420 N⋅m (42.8 kg⋅m; 310 lb⋅ft) @ 2,000 rpm	6-speed manual	AWD	2012-2021

== Safety ==
ANCAP test results Mazda 6 (2012)
Test	Score
Overall	5 /5 stars
Frontal offset	14.44/16
Side impact	16/16
Pole	2/2
Seat belt reminders	3/3
Whiplash protection	Good
Pedestrian protection	Adequate
Electronic stability control	Standard

ANCAP test results Mazda 6 (2018, aligned with Euro NCAP)
Test	Points	%
Overall:	5 /5 stars	
Adult occupant:	36.1	95%
Child occupant:	44.8	91%
Pedestrian:	31.8	66%
Safety assist:	9.5	73%

== Special models ==
=== 20th Anniversary ===
To commemorate the 20th anniversary of the Atenza/Mazda6 nameplate, Mazda released two special trims. The 20th Anniversary Edition would be available in Japan, Europe, Malaysia, Indonesia, Philippines, Thailand, Brunei, Australia and New Zealand, and the Sports Appearance in Japan, both featuring new grille designs, side mirror caps, wheels and garnishes. New exclusive colors are also available, and a black Nappa leather interior has been added as an option. Performance has also been enhanced with improvements in power and torque and better pedal/steering feel.

== Motorsport ==
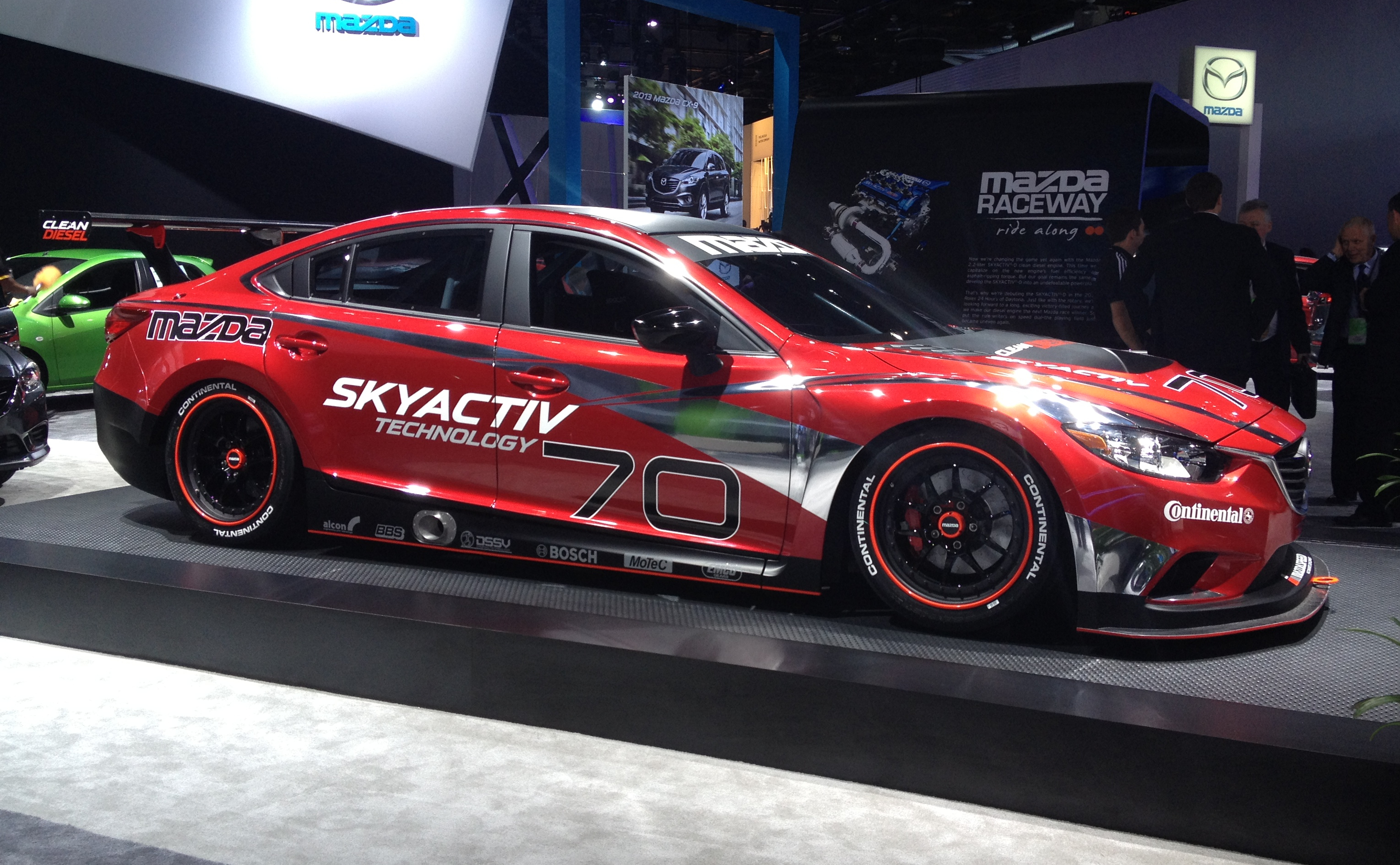
Mazda6 Skyactiv-D race car

In 2013, Mazda entered the new GX class of the Grand-Am Rolex Sports Car Series, with Mazda6 cars powered by its 2.2L diesel Skyactiv-D engine. During the first race at Rolex 24 At Daytona in January 2013, all three cars had to retire in the first few hours due to engine failure. Mazda ultimately won the 2013 GX class championship, beating rivals Porsche and Lotus. It was the only year for the class before the series rolled into the United (now WeatherTech) SportsCar Championship.

The Mazda6 was also used as a racing vehicle for the GTS class at SCCA Pro Racing World Challenge. Mazda finished first in the manufacturer's championship standings. Mazda6 drivers also finished first and second in the Touring Car driver points.

== Takeri ==
Mazda Takeri
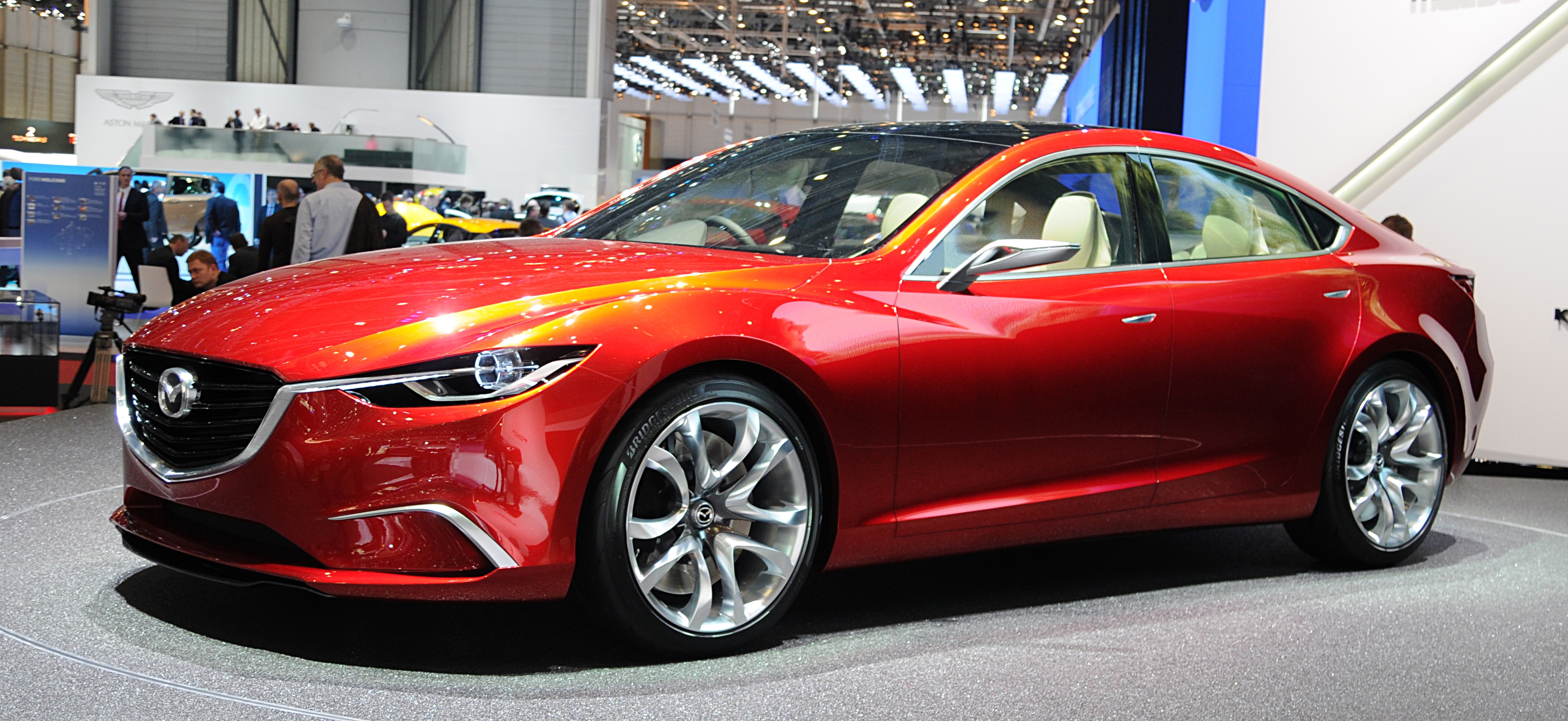
- The Takeri at the 2012 Geneva Motor Show

Overview
- Production: 2011

Body and chassis
- Class: Concept car
- Body style: 4-door sedan
- Layout: FR layout

Powertrain
- Engine: 2.2 L SKYACTIV-D I4 (diesel)

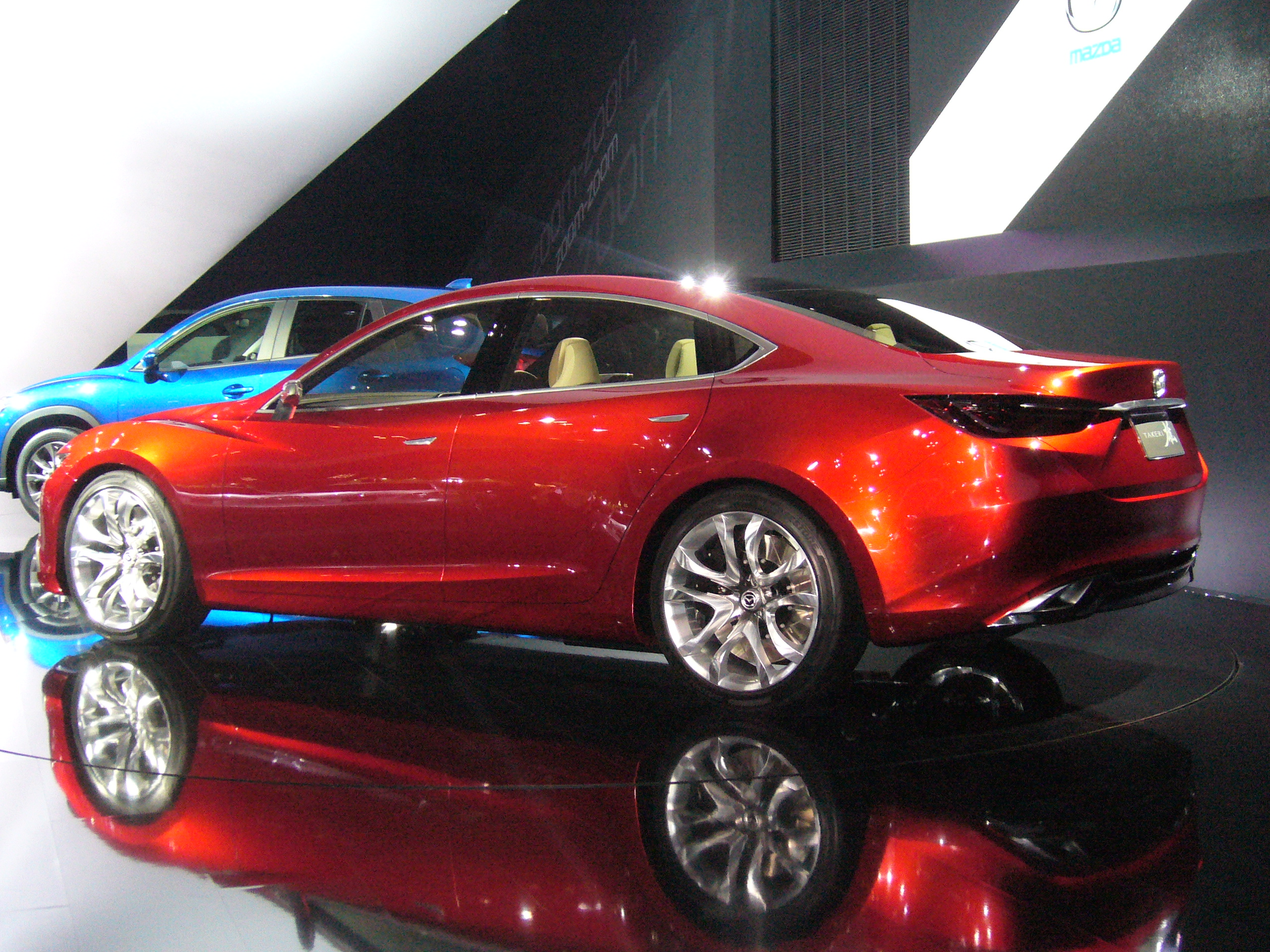
Rear view

The Mazda Takeri is a concept car made by Mazda. It was a preview of the GJ Mazda6. It was unveiled in 2011 at the Tokyo Motor Show.
