= John Goss =

John Goss may refer to:

- John Goss (baritone) (1894–1953), English baritone
- Sir John Goss (composer) (1800–1880), English organist and composer
- John Goss (racing driver) (born 1943), Australian racing driver
  - John Goss Special, a version of the Ford Falcon built to celebrate his Bathurst win in 1974
- John Goss (politician) (born 1943), Australian politician
- John C. Goss (born 1958), American artist and author
- John Goss (badminton), played Badminton at the 1986 Commonwealth Games

== See also ==
- John Gosse, Canadian geologist
