= 2017 Touring Car Masters =

Australian motor racing series

The 2017 Touring Car Masters was an Australian motor racing series for touring cars manufactured between 1 January 1963 and 31 December 1978. It was the eleventh running of the Touring Car Masters series. Each car was allocated into one the following classes: Pro Masters, Pro Am, Pro Sports, IROC (Porsche), Trans Am.

The series was won by Steven Johnson driving a Ford Mustang. Johnson also won the Pro Masters class with Adam Bressington (Chevrolet Camaro) winning Pro Am and Darren Beale (Holden Monaro GTS) winning Pro Sports.

== Teams and drivers ==
The following teams and drivers contested the 2017 series.

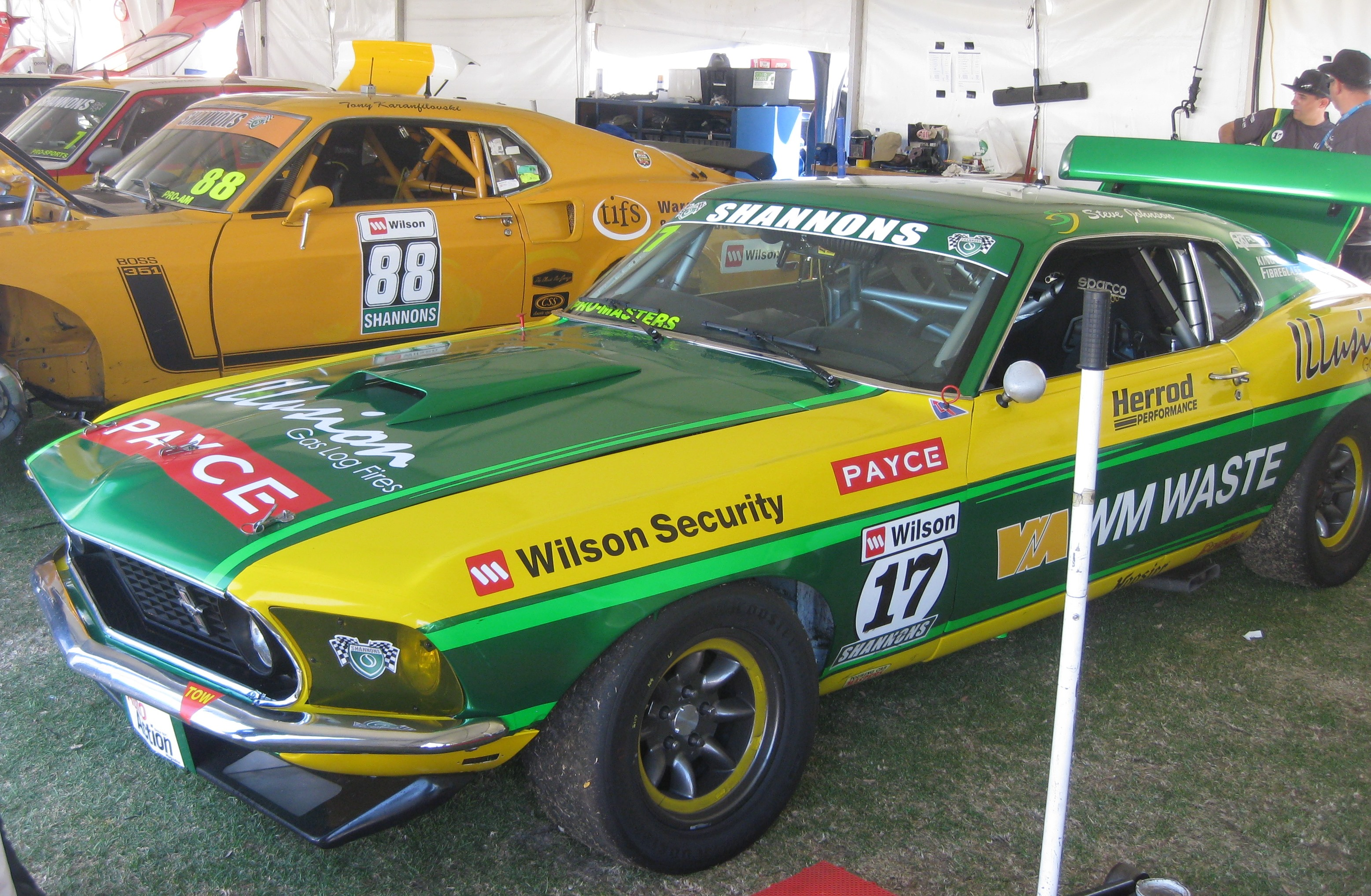
Steven Johnson won the series driving a Ford Mustang

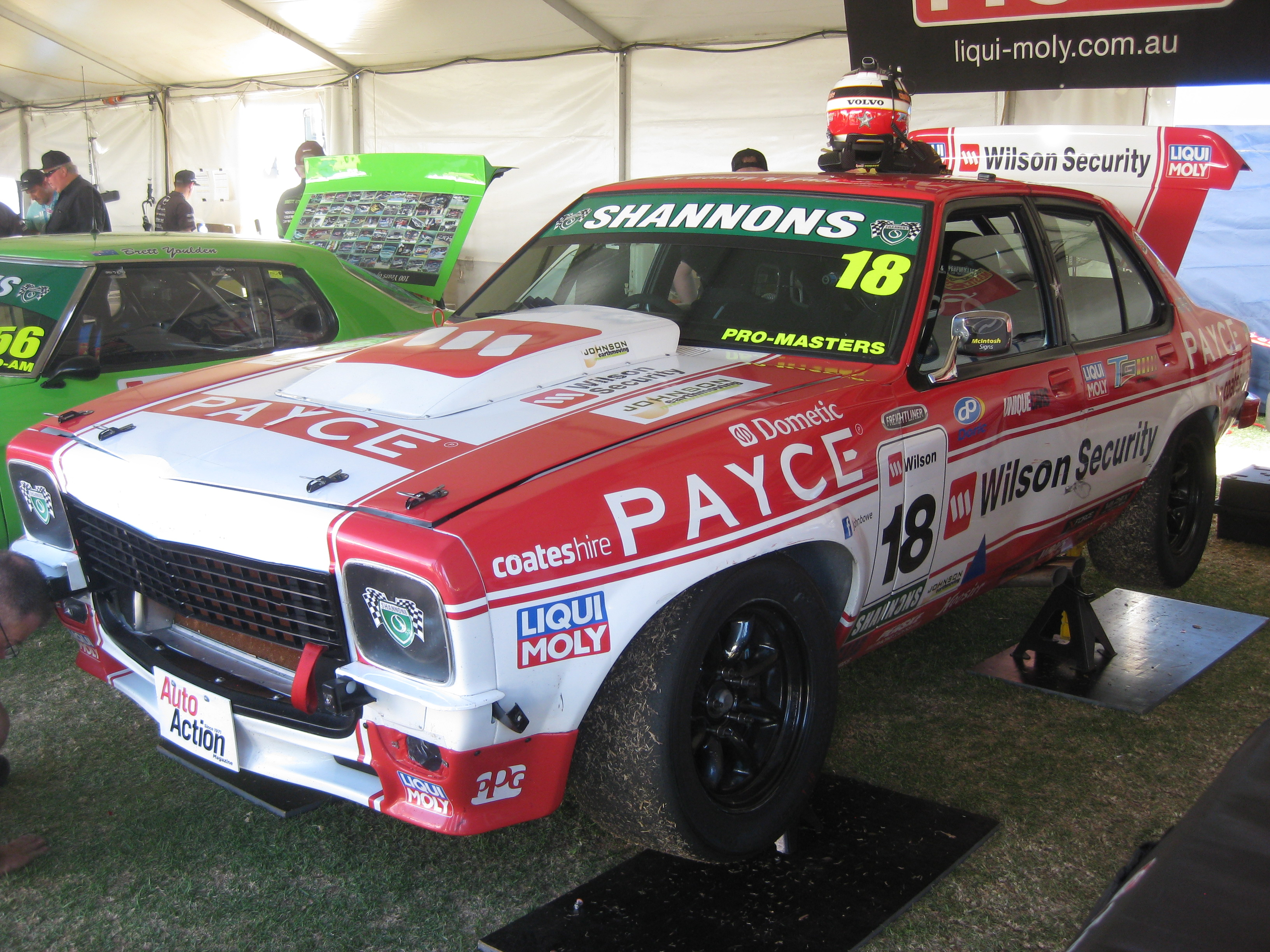
John Bowe placed second outright driving a Holden Torana SL/R 5000

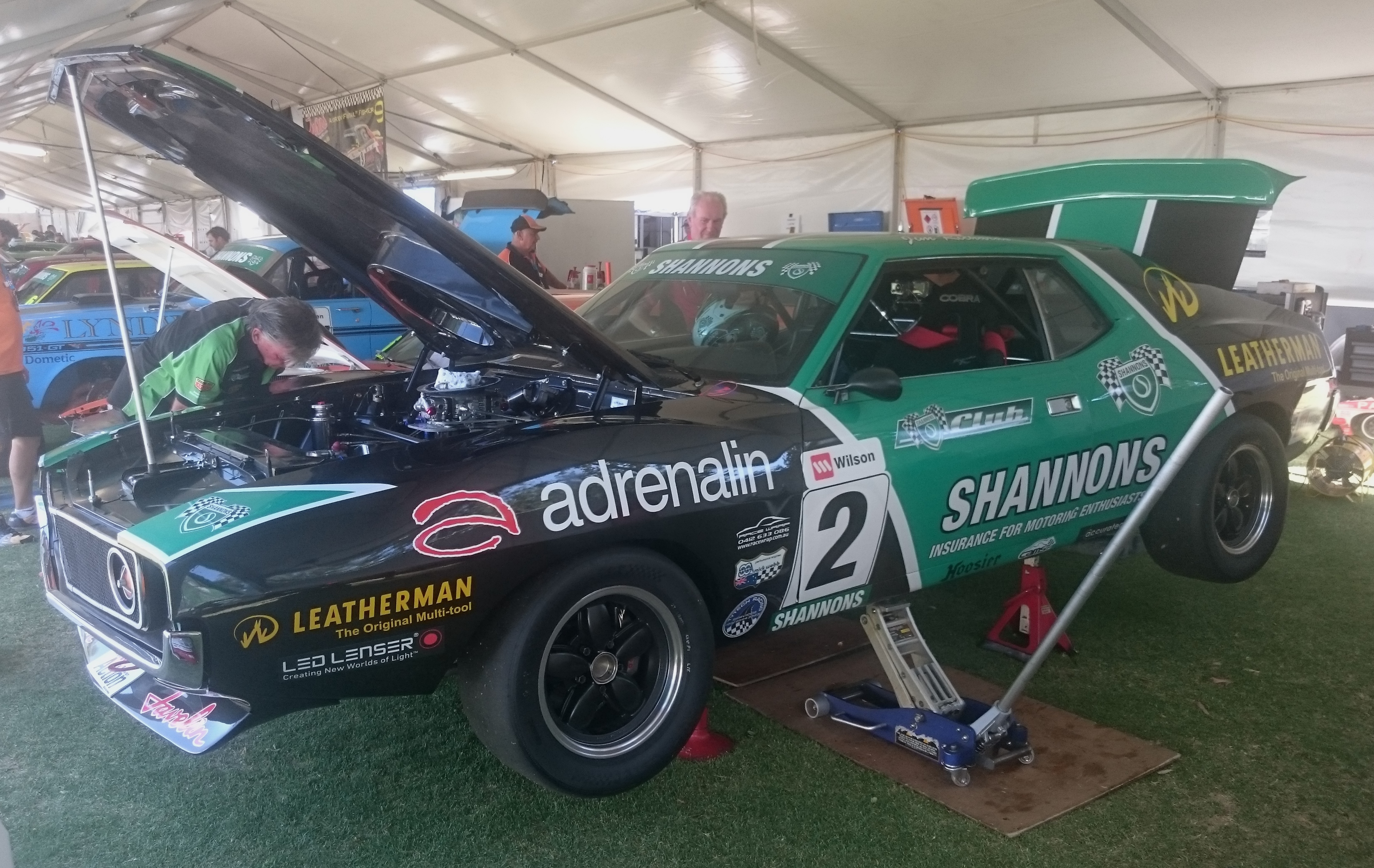
Jim Richards placed 14th driving an AMC Javelin (pictured) and a Ford Falcon Sprint

Team	Car	Class	No.	Drivers	Rounds
SportsMed SA	1974 Porsche 911 IROC	IROC	1	(Australia) Greg Keen	1
SportsMed SA	1974 Porsche 911 IROC	IROC	32	(Australia) Amanda Sparks	1
Hawk Brake Pads	Chevrolet Camaro SS	Inv	1	(United States) Dave Roberts	6
Shannons Insurance	1972 AMC Javelin	Pro Master	2	(New Zealand) Jim Richards	1
Shannons Insurance	1964 Ford Falcon Sprint	Pro Master	2	(New Zealand) Jim Richards	3,5-7
Hercules Engines	1966 Ford Mustang Fastback	Pro Am	3	(Australia) Cameron Mason	All
Skye Sands	1970 Ford Mustang Fastback	Pro Am	4	(Australia) Thomas Randle	1
Skye Sands	1970 Ford Mustang Fastback	Pro Am	4	(Australia) Rusty French	4-7
ACDelco	1974 Holden Torana SL/R 5000	Pro Am	5	(Australia) Bruce Williams	2-4,6-7
Multispares Racing	1974 Holden Torana SL/R 5000	Pro Am	6	(Australia) Ryan Hansford	All
Wisely Motorsport	1974 Holden Torana SL/R 5000	Pro Sports	7	(Australia) Bob Wisely	1,3-7
Lady Luck Racing	1964 Ford Mustang Coupe	Pro Am	8	(Australia) Terry Lawlor	1,5-6
Jesus Racing	1971 Ford Falcon XY GTHO	Pro Am	9	(Australia) Andrew Fisher	1-3,6-7
Lion Mill Sol / vplates.com.au	Ford Falcon XA GT	Pro Sport	11	(Australia) Melinda Price	1,5-6
Giraffe Civil Contracting	1974 Holden Torana SL/R 5000	Pro Am	12	(Australia) Adam Garwood	1-6
Giraffe Civil Contracting	1973 Ford Capri	Inv	24	(Australia) Greg Garwood	3
Mark Poole Motorsport	1974 Porsche 911 IROC	Pro Sport	13	(Australia) Rory O'Neill	1
Carne Grill	1969 Ford Mustang Fastback	Pro Master	16	(Australia) Gavin Bullas	7
WM Waste / Illusion Gas Log Fires; Synergy Race Engines	1969 Ford Mustang Fastback	Pro Master	17	(Australia) Steven Johnson	All
Wilson Security / PAYCE	1974 Holden Torana SL/R 5000	Pro Master	18	(Australia) John Bowe	All
Tincome Industrial Services	1972 Holden Monaro GTS Coupe	Pro Masters	19	(Australia) Darren Beale	All
Treloar Roses	1973 Chrysler Charger	Pro Sport	21	(Australia) Robert Braune	3
Hutchinson Builders / Angliss	Pontiac Firebird Trans Am	Trans Am	25	(Australia) Brett Curran	4
Maxi-Trans Trailers	Chevrolet Camaro±	Pro Am	25	(Australia) Paul Freestone	6
Wanna Burger	Pontiac Firebird Trans Am	Trans Am	26	(Australia) Shannon O'Brien	4
MOCOMM Motorsport Communication	Holden Monaro GTS Coupe	Pro Sport	27	(Australia) Jim Policina	7
Speedgas / Tilley Auto Garage	1964 Ford Mustang Coupe	Pro Am	28	(Australia) Brad Tilley	1
Speedgas / Tilley Auto Garage	1971 Ford Falcon XY GTHO	Pro Am	28	(Australia) Brad Tilley	6-7
Speedgas / Tilley Auto Garage	Ford Mustang Coupe	Pro Sport	29	(Australia) Jamie Tilley	7
Matt Stone Racing	1978 Holden Torana A9X Hatchback	Pro Am	35	(Australia) Jason Gomersall	1-5,7
Gawler Self Storage	1974 Porsche 911 IROC	IROC	38	(Australia) Bernie Stack	1-2
THD Motorsport	1969 Ford Boss Mustang	Pro Sports	46	(Australia) Leo Tobin	1-4,6-7
Melbournes Cheapest Cars; Darwins Cheapest Cars; Brisbanes Cheapest Cars	1974 Ford Falcon XB Hardtop	Pro Masters	48	(Australia) Eddie Abelnica	2-6
Outbound Racing / wheels.com	1972 Holden Monaro GTS	Pro Am	52	(Australia) Keith Kassulke	4
Wasp Steering & Suspension	1972 Holden Monaro HQ GTS Coupe	Pro Am	56	(Australia) Brett Youlden	1
Graham Alexander	Holden Monaro HT GTS	Pro Sport	57	(Australia) Graham Alexander	2,5
Glennan Transport / ANGLOMOIL	1969 Valiant Pacer	Pro Am	60	(Australia) Cameron Tilley	1-4,6-7
Cannon Trailers	1971 Ford Falcon XY GTHO	Pro Sport	65	(Australia) Michael Cannon	2-3,7
GFR Industries	Chevrolet Camaro SS	Trans Am	72	(Australia) Geoff Fane	4-7
Lyndways Builders	1971 Ford Falcon XY GTHO	Pro Am	74	(Australia) Wayne Mercer	1-3,5-7
Red Rock Winery / Werks RRR; Kalus Kenny Interlex; Performance 9	1974 Porsche 911 IROC	IROC	77	(Australia) Rohan Little	1-2,5-6
Red Rock Winery / Werks RRR; Kalus Kenny Interlex; Performance 9	1974 Porsche 911 IROC	IROC	90	(Australia) Sven Burchartz	1-2
Red Rock Winery / Werks RRR; Kalus Kenny Interlex; Performance 9	1974 Porsche 911 IROC	IROC	91	(Australia) Stan Adler	6
Red Rock Winery / Werks RRR; Kalus Kenny Interlex; Performance 9	1974 Porsche 911 IROC	IROC	911	(Australia) Stan Adler	1-2
Whiteline Racing / King Springs	1970 Chevrolet Camaro RS	Pro Masters	85	(Australia) Mark King	1-2
Whiteline Racing / King Springs	1972 Holden Monaro GTS	Pro Masters	85	(Australia) Mark King	3-7
Whiteline Racing / King Springs	1969 Chevrolet Camaro SS	Pro Am	95	(Australia) Adam Bressington	All
TIFS - Warehousing & Distribution	1969 Ford Mustang	Pro Am	88	(Australia) Tony Karanfilovski	All
SA Structural	1974 Porsche 911 IROC	IROC	91	(Australia) Manny Palyaris	1-2
John's Furniture Removals	1964 Mercury Comet	Pro Sport	97	(Australia) Allen Boughen	1,3-4,6-7

== Race calendar ==
The series was contested over seven rounds. Rounds included Series Races and non-points Domestic Trophy Races (indicated below with TR).

Round		Circuit	City / state	Date	Pole position	Fastest lap	Winning driver	Winning team
1	R1	(South Australia) Adelaide Street Circuit	Adelaide, South Australia	3 March	(Australia) John Bowe	(Australia) John Bowe	(Australia) John Bowe	Wilson Security / PAYCE
1	R2	(South Australia) Adelaide Street Circuit	Adelaide, South Australia	4 March		(Australia) John Bowe^{†}	(Australia) John Bowe	Wilson Security / PAYCE
1	TR	(South Australia) Adelaide Street Circuit	Adelaide, South Australia	5 March		(Australia) Ryan Hansford	(Australia) Brad Tilley	Speedgas / Tilley Auto Garage
2	TR	(Victoria (state)) Winton Raceway	Winton, Victoria	19–21 May		(Australia) John Bowe	(Australia) John Bowe	Wilson Security / PAYCE
2	R1	(Victoria (state)) Winton Raceway	Winton, Victoria	19–21 May	(Australia) Jason Gomersall		(Australia) Jason Gomersall	Bigmate Racing
2	R2	(Victoria (state)) Winton Raceway	Winton, Victoria	19–21 May		(Australia) Steven Johnson	(Australia) Adam Garwood	Giraffe Civil Contracting
3	TR	(Northern Territory) Hidden Valley Raceway	Darwin, Northern Territory	16–18 June		(Australia) Eddie Abelnica	(Australia) Greg Garwood	Giraffe Civil Contracting
3	R1	(Northern Territory) Hidden Valley Raceway	Darwin, Northern Territory	16–18 June	(Australia) Steven Johnson	(Australia) John Bowe	(Australia) Steven Johnson	WM Waste / Illusion Gas Log Fires
3	R2	(Northern Territory) Hidden Valley Raceway	Darwin, Northern Territory	16–18 June		(Australia) John Bowe	(Australia) John Bowe	Wilson Security / PAYCE
4	TR	Queensland Raceway	Ipswich, Queensland	28–30 July		(Australia) John Bowe	(Australia) John Bowe	Wilson Security / PAYCE
4	R1	Queensland Raceway	Ipswich, Queensland	28–30 July	(Australia) John Bowe	(Australia) John Bowe	(Australia) John Bowe	Wilson Security / PAYCE
4	R2	Queensland Raceway	Ipswich, Queensland	28–30 July		(Australia) Eddie Abelnica	(Australia) Eddie Abelnica	Brisbanes Cheapest Cars
5	R1	(Victoria (state)) Sandown Raceway	Melbourne, Victoria	15–17 September	(Australia) John Bowe	(Australia) Steven Johnson	(Australia) Steven Johnson	WM Waste / Illusion Gas Log Fires
5	R2	(Victoria (state)) Sandown Raceway	Melbourne, Victoria	15–17 September	Race Cancelled^{a}			
5	R3	(Victoria (state)) Sandown Raceway	Melbourne, Victoria	15–17 September		(Australia) Steven Johnson^{†}	(Australia) Steven Johnson	WM Waste / Illusion Gas Log Fires
6	TR	(New South Wales) Mount Panorama	Bathurst, New South Wales	5–8 October		(Australia) Eddie Abelnica	(Australia) Eddie Abelnica	Melbournes Cheapest Cars
6	R1	(New South Wales) Mount Panorama	Bathurst, New South Wales	5–8 October	(Australia) Steven Johnson	(Australia) John Bowe	(Australia) Steven Johnson	Synergy Race Engines
6	R2	(New South Wales) Mount Panorama	Bathurst, New South Wales	5–8 October		(Australia) John Bowe^{†}	(Australia) Steven Johnson	Synergy Race Engines
7	R1	(New South Wales) Newcastle Street Circuit	Newcastle, New South Wales	24–26 November	(Australia) Ryan Hansford	(Australia) Steven Johnson	(Australia) Steven Johnson	Synergy Race Engines
7	R2	(New South Wales) Newcastle Street Circuit	Newcastle, New South Wales	24–26 November		(Australia) John Bowe^{†}	(Australia) Steven Johnson	Synergy Race Engines

- ^{†} New lap records
- ^a Jason Gomersall had a large accident at turn six on lap one during Race 2 at Sandown Raceway. Therefore the race was abandoned.

== Series standings ==
=== Outright standings ===
Pos.	Driver	Car	Total
1	Steve Johnson	Ford Mustang	917
2	John Bowe	Holden Torana SL/R 5000	906
3	Adam Bressington	Chevrolet Camaro SS	881
4	Ryan Hansford	Holden Torana SL/R 5000	818
5	Adam Garwood	Holden Torana SL/R 5000	657
6	Eddie Abelnica	Ford Falcon XB	629
7	Tony Karanfilovski	Ford Mustang	585
8	Cameron Mason	Ford Mustang	574
9	Jason Gomersall	Holden Torana	565
10	Mark King	Chevrolet Camaro RS	557
11	Cameron Tilley	Chrysler Valiant Pacer	519
12	Darren Beale	Holden Monaro GTS	491
13	Leo Tobin	Ford Boss Mustang	477
14	Jim Richards	AMC Javelin & Ford Falcon Sprint	469
15	Wayne Mercer	Ford Falcon XY GTHO	465
16	Bob Wisely	Holden Torana SL/R 5000	401
17	Andrew Fisher	Ford Falcon XY GTHO	356
18	Bruce Williams	Holden Torana SL/R 5000	309
19	Brad Tilley	Ford Mustang	292
20	Allen Boughen	Mercury Comet	291
21	Blu Cannon	Ford Falcon XY	209
22	Rohan Little	Porsche 911	194
23	Terry Lawlor	Ford Mustang	163
24	Melinda Price	Ford Falcon XA GT	162
25	Graham Alexander	Holden HT Monaro GTS	148
26	Sven Burchartz	Porsche 911	132
27	Rusty French	Ford Mustang	131
28	Brett Youlden	Holden Monaro GTS	104
29	Paul Freestone	Chevrolet Camaro	104
30	Robert Braune	Chrysler Charger	92
31	Keith Kassulke	Holden Monaro GTS	73
32	Jamie Tilley	Ford Mustang	45

=== Class standings ===
Pos.	Driver	ADE (South Australia)			WIN (Victoria (state))			HID (Northern Territory)			QLD (Queensland)			SAN (Victoria (state))			BAT (New South Wales)			NEW (New South Wales)		Pts.
Pro Masters
1	Steve Johnson	Ret	5	4	16	23	6	9	1	2	5	3	3	1	C	1	15	1	1	1	1	917
2	John Bowe	1	1	6	1	2	Ret	Ret	2	1	4	1	4	8	C	2	4	2	2	3	3	906
3	Eddie Abelnica				3	3	2	5	4	3	DNS	2	1	6	C	5	1	6	5			629
4	Jason Gomersall	7	6	12	6	1	Ret	8	3	10	8	5	5	11	C	DNS				7	18	565
5	Mark King	5	4	7	12	5	Ret	12	17	17	14	Ret	10	12	C	10	Ret	9	Ret	11	9	557
6	Jim Richards	11	7	Ret				2	12	9				13	C	6	18	8	7	14	10	469
Pro Am
1	Adam Bressington	2	2	8	13	10	3	15	7	5	3	6	7	4	C	4	16	3	4	4	2	881
2	Ryan Hansford	3	Ret	3	8	4	4	10	9	6	6	4	2	7	C	3	8	5	10	2	4	818
3	Adam Garwood	10	10	2	Ret	9	1	4	6	7	1	7	6	2	C	Ret	6	4	3			657
4	Tony Karanfilovski	9	9	13	7	11	Ret	13	Ret	14	12	8	12	5	C	13	13	10	9	8	5	585
5	Cameron Mason	13	13	9	4	12	7	3	11	12	2	12	16	3	C	8	Ret	DNS	DNS	6	DNS	574
6	Cameron Tilley	6	Ret	Ret	15	6	5	14	10	11	10	10	Ret				2	14	12	9	7	519
7	Wayne Mercer	14	11	5	5	15	10	18	16	13				16	C	Ret	10	13	14	12	8	465
8	Andrew Fisher	4	3	Ret	17	24	Ret	11	DNS	DNS							7	7	6	DNS	DNS	356
9	Bruce Williams				2	7	Ret	6	5	4	Ret	DNS	DNS				Ret	Ret	13	5	Ret	309
10	Brad Tilley	11	8	1													12	12	8	10	6	292
11	Terry Lawlor	Ret	12	Ret										9	C	7	Ret	Ret	DNS			163
12	Rusty French										9	14	13	DNS	C	11	3	15	Ret	16	16	131
13	Brett Youlden	8	14	15																		104
14	Keith Kassulke										Ret	13	11									73
15	Thomas Randle	DNS	DNS	DNS																		0
Pro Sport
1	Darren Beale	19	20	17	20	25	12	20	19	19	16	15	18	17	C	16	17	19	18	19	17	491
2	Leo Tobin	15	15	10	9	14	9	7	15	16	7	11	9				14	18	16	18	15	477
3	Bob Wisely	22	22	21				21	20	20	15	17	17	15	C	15	Ret	DNS	DNS	20	19	401
4	Allen Boughen	Ret	13	14				19	18	21	13	Ret	15				11	17	17	DNS	DNS	291
5	Michael Cannon				11	16	8	17	14	18										17	14	209
6	Melinda Price													Ret	C	DNS	19	20	DNS			161
7	Graham Alexander				24	22	16							10	C	12						148
8	Robert Braune							16	13	15												92
9	Jamie Tilley																			13	12	45
IROC
1	Rohan Little	20	21	16	19	19	14							DNS	C	14	Ret	DNS	DNS			283
2	Manny Palyaris	18	19	19	21	20	15															254
3	Bernie Stack	17	16	11	10	13	Ret															226
4	Sven Burchartz	16	17	18	14	8	Ret															218
5	Stan Adler				22	18	11										20	21	19			110
6	Rory O'Neill	21	Ret	20																		90
7	Greg Keene	DNS	DNS	DNS																		0
8	Amanda Sparks	DNS	DNS	DNS																		0
Trans Am
1	Shannon O'Brien										Ret	9	8									94
2	Geoff Fane										11	16	14	14	C	9	9	16	15	15	13	84
3	Brett Curran										DNS	DNS	DNS									0
Invitational
1	Greg Garwood							1	8	8												122
