= John Goss (racing driver) =

Australian racing driver

- Nationality: Australia
- Born: 2 May 1943 (age 83) Glen Iris, Victoria
- Retired: 1995

Australian Touring Car Championship
- Years active: 1972–78
- Teams: McLeod Ford; John Goss Racing
- Wins: 0
- Best finish: 11th in 1972 Australian Touring Car Championship

Championship titles
- 1972 1974 1976 1985: South Pacific Touring Series; Bathurst 1000; Australian Grand Prix; Bathurst 1000

John Goss OAM (born 2 May 1943, in Glen Iris, Victoria) is an Australian retired motor racing driver who competed in his home country during the 1960s, 1970s and 1980s. He is the only driver to have won Australia's two most prestigious races, the Bathurst 1000 (1974 and 1985), and the Australian Grand Prix (1976).

During his career, John Goss gained a reputation for long acceptance speeches, with many joking that his victory speech on the Bathurst podium following his 1974 win took almost as long as the race itself (the race, the second to be run in wet conditions, lasted 7 hours, 51 minutes and 43 seconds).

Goss was awarded the Medal of the Order of Australia in 2018 for services to motorsport.

== Early career ==
Having moved from Victoria to Tasmania as a child, Goss began racing in his adopted state in Holden FJs and Ford Customlines. He then built his own sports car, the Tornado Ford, which he took to the mainland with some success, scoring points in the Australian Sports Car Championship in both 1969 and 1970. He also raced Ford Falcon GTHOs in production car racing from 1969 and stayed loyal to Ford for much of his career.

== McLeod Ford ==
=== Series Production ===
Goss debuted at the Bathurst 500 in 1969 driving a McLeod Ford (with its distinctive yellow/black chequer windscreen strip) sponsored Ford Falcon GTHO, but Goss's co-driver Dennis Cribbin crashed the Falcon at Forrest's Elbow. In 1970 John Goss posted the fastest lap during the Bathurst 500 in his XW Falcon GTHO Phase II. The following year Goss won two rounds of the Toby Lee Series at Oran Park against such opposition as Colin Bond and Fred Gibson.

Goss won the 1972 South Pacific Touring Series and the 1972 Sandown 250 endurance race, this year being the last to run competition under Series Production rules. He also put his XY Falcon GTHO on the front row of the grid at the 1972 Hardie-Ferodo 500, qualifying second fastest next to the Works GTHO of expat-Canadian Allan Moffat. Engine failure after 24 wet laps ended Goss's race.

=== Group C ===
With the Series Production class being replaced by the new Group C Touring Car class in 1973, Goss was the first driver to develop and race the new Ford Falcon XA GT Hardtop. Unlike Series Production, the new Group C rules allowed considerable modifications. Goss obtained sponsorship from Shell and continued his association with Max McLeod, a prominent Ford dealer (McLeod Ford) in Rockdale, New South Wales – known for his "Horn cars" – as well as obtaining factory assistance from Ford Australia, who provided Goss with purpose-built XA racing chassis. Goss was actually the first to race the XA Hardtop in the 1973 ATCC, even before the Works team who used a modified Phase III GTHO and didn't make the switch to the Hardtop until the Endurance races later in the year. Goss and Kevin Bartlett teamed up for the 1973 Hardie-Ferodo 1000 at Bathurst and qualified on pole position with a time of 2:33.4 (it was to be Goss' only pole at Bathurst) ahead of the GTR-XU1 Holden Torana of Peter Brock and Doug Chivas. Goss started and built up a good lead which was kept until he was involved in a crash at The Cutting which damaged his front end. The Falcon suffered radiator damage which later caused its retirement on lap 110 of the now 163 lap race (prior to 1973, race distance was 500 miles and ran only 130 laps).

The pair returned to Bathurst for the 1974 Hardie-Ferodo 1000 in the same car – repainted from yellow to blue after losing Shell as their major sponsor – and proved to have the reliability needed to last through a race marred by driving rain, finishing first. To celebrate the victory, Ford Australia released a limited edition XB Falcon 500 Hardtop in 1975 called the John Goss Special. Actual production numbers of these cars were never released by Ford, but estimates range anywhere between 260 and 800 – they are now considered collectible.

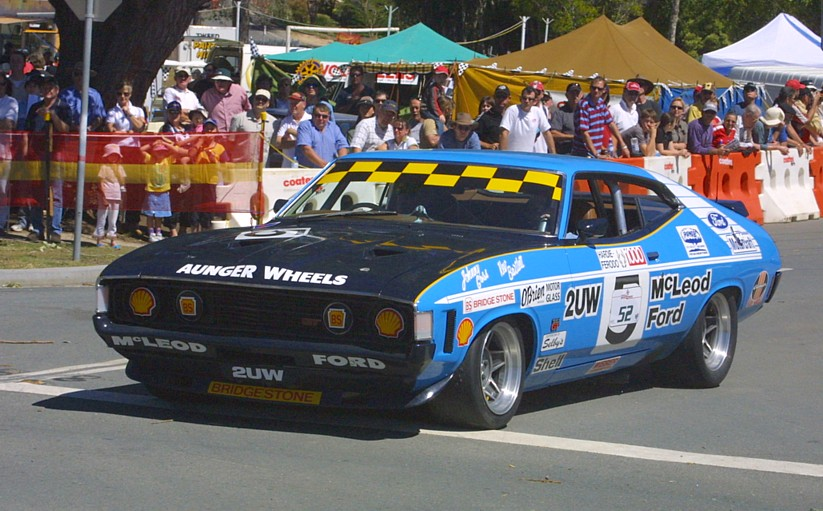
John Goss's latter-day replica of his 1974 Bathurst winning car

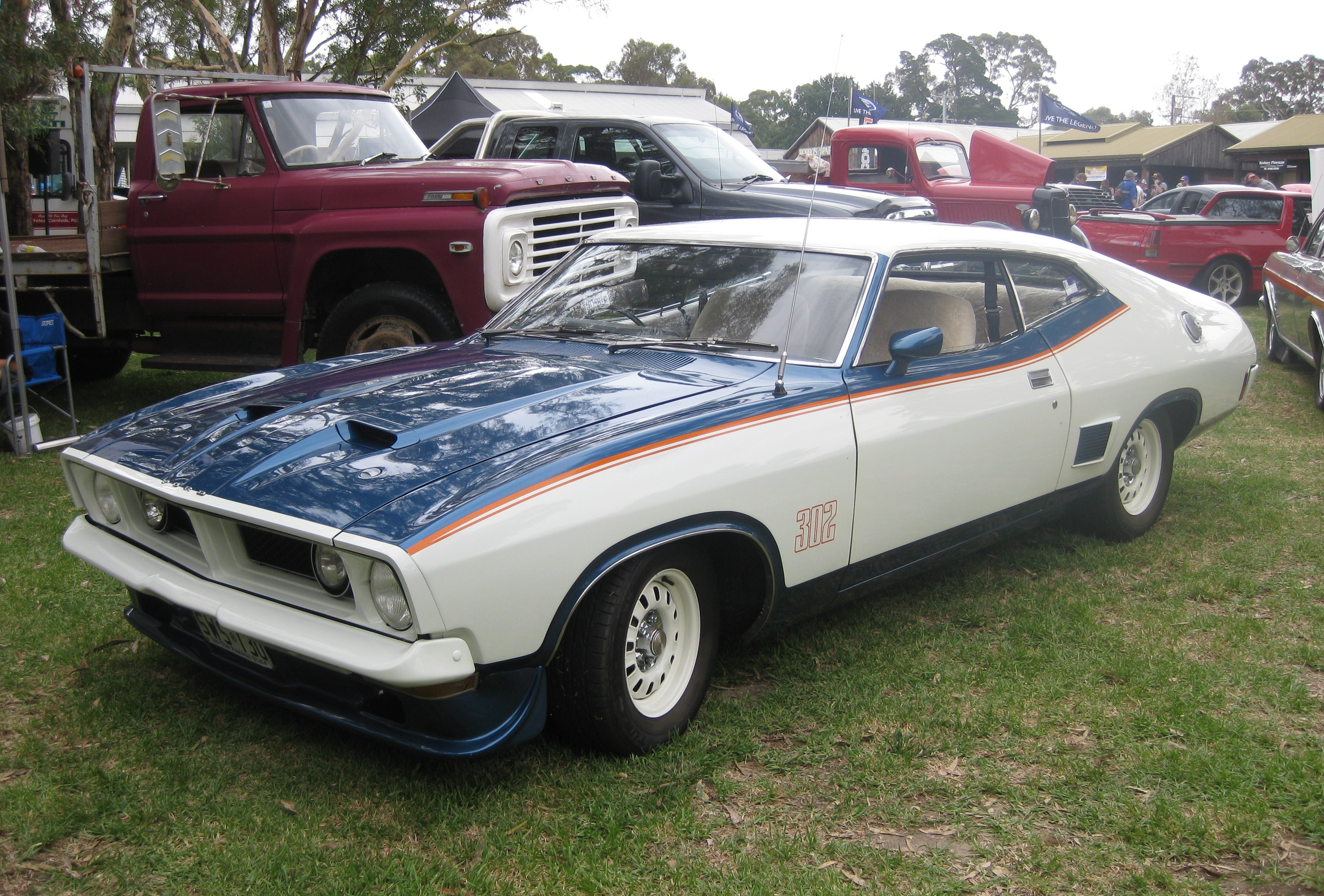
Ford XB Falcon Hardtop "John Goss Special"

== Formula 5000 ==
Goss won the Sandown Park round of the 1975 Tasman Series and the 1976 Australian Grand Prix at Sandown Park in Victoria, driving an Australian built Matich A53 Repco Holden in both events. In doing so he became the only driver to ever win both the Bathurst 1000 and the Australian Grand Prix. During the mid-1970s Goss was concentrating his racing efforts more on the F5000 than his Croup C Falcons and ever loyal to Ford tried to run the A53 with a 5.0L Ford V8 but the concept had little success.

== Jaguar ==
=== Group C ===
From 1977 to 1979, Goss registered three 'Did Not Finish' results at Bathurst driving Falcons with 24 Hours of Le Mans winner Henri Pescarolo as co-driver. In the 1977 Hardie-Ferodo 1000 he ran a second team car for Australia's three time Formula One World Champion Jack Brabham, and Jack's son Geoff.

Then in 1980, Goss began campaigning a V12 powered Jaguar XJS at Bathurst, at first with no luck. In the 1980 race he started what was basically a standard car from 58th on the grid, but lasted only 14 laps before retiring with gearbox failure. In 1981, he teamed with 1965 winner Barry Seton in the XJS, and after an improved qualifying effort (19th), they weren't classified as finishers of the crash shortened race having completed only 73 of the 120 laps and being caught up in the crash on the top of the mountain. Goss returned with a better prepared effort in 1982, sharing the driving with American IMSA Jaguar sports car race driver / team owner Bob Tullius, who also assisted with technical info for the car and engine. Goss qualified the car 14th with a time of 2:22.3 (almost 5 seconds slower than pole sitter Allan Grice in a V8 Holden Commodore, but some 5.7 seconds faster than he had achieved in 1981), but after a strong, consistent run, once again the big cat failed to finish following suspension failure on lap 119.

Goss missed the 1983 James Hardie 1000, but returned in 1984 for the last year of Australia's Group C racing sharing a drive with Tom Walkinshaw, team owner of the European Touring Car Championships Tom Walkinshaw Racing. Walkinshaw, who ran three factory backed Group A XJS' in the ETCC (and would go on to win that title in 1984), added a lot of technical assistance to the team with revised suspension and the use of one of TWR's own V12 engines. Despite trouble in qualifying with no suitable rear tyres arriving in time to use, the Scot qualified the car in 8th with a 2:16.09 lap (faster than Peter Brock's 1983 pole time), before falling to 10th in the Hardies Heroes top ten run-off with a 2:18.96, again due to unsuitable rear tyres. Walkinshaw also started the race never left the line. The Jags clutch had gone leaving Walkinshaw stranded with his arm out the window warning other drivers he was stationary. Before the race Walkinshaw had informed John Harvey, who was lined up behind him on that grid, that he wasn't confident of a quick start as the cars clutch was designed for the rolling starts used in the ETCC. Harvey took the precaution to line his HDT VK Commodore so that he could get around the slow starting Jag if needed, a tactic which allowed him to avoid the chaos that ensued. Unfortunately in the dust kicked up off the start, the Kevin Bartlett owned Chevrolet Camaro of John Tesoriero was coming through at speed and could not avoid the #12 Jag, hitting it in the rear. The Camaro was then hit by the fast starting Toyota Celica Supra of Peter Williamson causing a start line pile up. This caused the race to be stopped as the track was completely blocked by the three cars involved, with the back half of the field having to stop to avoid the incident. It would be the only time the race has ever been restarted in its history. While Goss later admitted that the team could have repaired the Jaguar and re-joined the race, the decision was made to withdraw the car as the repairs would have taken almost half the race.

=== Group A ===
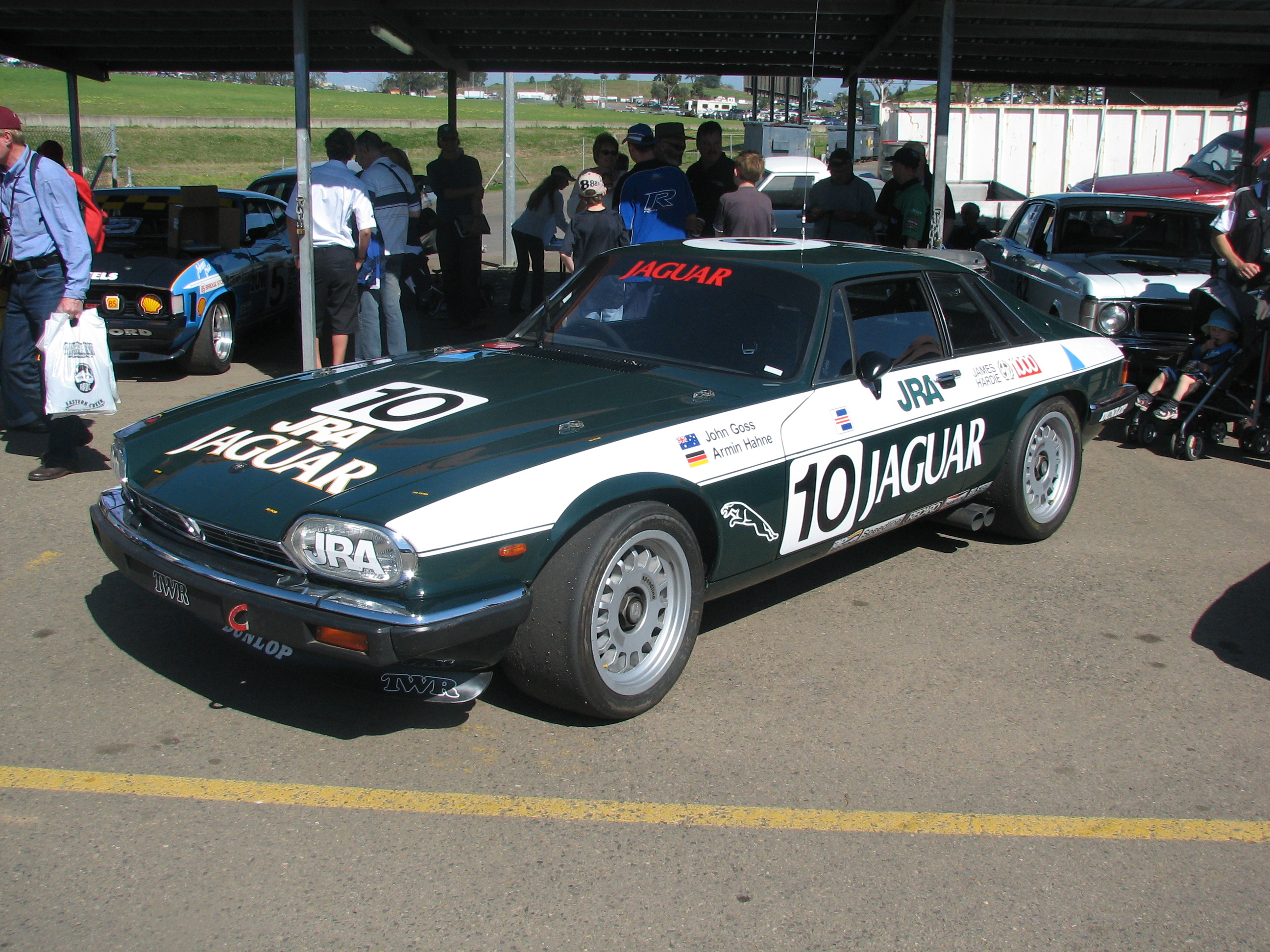
The 1980 Jaguar XJ-S John Goss repainted as a replica of the 1985 James Hardie 1000 race winner

Australian Touring Car racing changed to International Group A rules in 1985, and Goss scored his second and last ourtight Bathurst win that year with West German co-driver Armin Hahne in one of a three-car assault on the Great Race by Tom Walkinshaw's TWR team using the 1984 ETCC-winning V12 Jaguar XJS' (Walkinshaw had been stung by the bad showing in 1984 and was determined to bring his own team back to conquer the race). Goss, installed by Walkinshaw as lead driver of the team's third car (#10), actually qualified fastest going into Hardies Heroes, giving lie to those who believed he was past his best as a driver and that Walkinshaw had made an error by having him drive. He ended up 6th in the Top Ten run-off after mistakes on both laps (1985 was the last year that cars were given two laps in Hardies Heroes).

The cars were held on the grid for a long time before the green flag was shown. This caused several cars, including the Goss Jaguar, to start overheating. To avoid this Goss actually turned the car off and only restarted it when the 30 second sign was shown, though the car was still overheating. Goss made a good start and for the opening laps was in a dice for 2nd with Allan Grice (Commodore), Robbie Francevic (Volvo), Dick Johnson (Ford Mustang), Jim Richards (BMW 635 CSi) and Peter Brock (Commodore). First Francevic, then Goss, broke free of the dice. Once free of the dice, Goss would chase down and take second from the Volvo in less than 10 laps, giving Jaguar a 1–2 on the road for the first time since the early laps before the team's second car driven by Jeff Allam retired with engine failure. From then on, the Goss/Hahne Jaguar was in second place for most of the race behind the Walkinshaw/Win Percy car. Goss and Hahne's job was made all the more difficult by the driver's seat of their car having completely broken at the base of the back. The seat first cracked during Hahne's first driving stint and broke completely when Goss returned to the car, giving both drivers very little support despite efforts by the team to hold it in place with cable ties to the roll cage. The team could have replaced the seat but felt they would have lost at least a lap in doing so and decided to soldier on, a decision ultimately justified. The #10 car took the lead on about lap 120 following a split oil line on the Walkinshaw/Percy car. Goss, unable to drive the car hard through the corners due to the broken seat, had to use the superior power of the V12 on Mountain and Conrod straights to keep up lap times, with both Peter Brock and Roberto Ravaglia (BMW) closing the gap to within 30 seconds. The chase effectively ended with Brock's engine failure on lap 160 allowing Goss to back off over the last 3 laps. Team owner Walkinshaw, who qualified on pole following the Top Ten, finished third with Win Percy, the pair crossing the finish line together.

After Jaguar Rover Australia declined to help fund a return effort by TWR in 1986 Goss returned with his own privately entered XJ-S backed by Citibank Australia and co-driven by veteran Bob Muir. After numerous problems in before and during qualifying including not passing scrutineering due to the liberal interpretation of the rear suspension pick up points and not having suitable size tyres, the pair started 26th, slower than the only other XJS in the race, a private effort driven by Garry Willmington and Peter Janson. Electrical troubles in the race resulting in a flat battery saw them complete 140 laps and finish 24th outright. Goss was involved in an incident on lap 2 of the race that took out the Roberto Ravaglia / Dieter Quester Schnitzer BMW 635 CSi which resulted in Ravaglia physically attacking Goss from behind following the Jag's first pit stop. Despite being offered by the race stewards the chance to lay charges against Ravaglia for the incident, Goss refused to take the case any further believing it was just one of those things and that the Italian was just caught up in the emotion of the moment. Goss later told Channel 7 pit reporter Pat Welsh (who had seen Ravaglia attack him) that he was "astounded" by what the Italian had done both on and off the track, though he did not elaborate on what took place in the pits.

== 1987-1990 ==
Goss missed the 1987 World Touring Car Championship round as well as the 1988 race but returned to drive for Glenn Seton Racing in 1989 in a Ford Sierra RS500. He paired with Glenn Seton for a fourth-placed finish at the Sandown 500. At the Bathurst 1000, Goss was teamed with Tony Noske in the team's second car, they were joined during the race by Seton after his own car had failed. After a troubled run the trio went on to finish 20th outright after the car started 17th.

Goss' final Bathurst 1000 came in 1990 when he paired with fellow Sydney based veteran Phil Ward in a Phil Ward Racing Mercedes-Benz 190E to finish 12th outright and a Division 2 class win after starting 38th. In contrast to his outright wins at Bathurst in 1974 and 1985, Goss' Div2 win with Ward was relatively straight forward as the Mercedes-Benz ran the race with no problems.

== Career results ==
| Season | Series | Position | Car | Team |
|---|---|---|---|---|
| 1969 | Australian Sports Car Championship | 9th | Tornado Ford | John Goss Racing |
| 1970 | Australian Sports Car Championship | 10th | Tornado Ford | McLeod Ford |
| 1972 | South Pacific Touring Series | 1st | Ford XY Falcon GTHO Phase III | McLeod Ford |
| 1972 | Australian Touring Car Championship | 11th | Ford XY Falcon GTHO Phase III | McLeod Ford |
| 1973 | Australian Touring Car Championship | 14th | Ford XA Falcon GT Hardtop | McLeod Ford |
| 1974 | South Pacific Touring Series | 2nd | Ford XA Falcon GT Hardtop | McLeod Ford |
| 1974 | Toby Lee Sports Sedan Series | 7th | Ford XA Falcon GT Hardtop | McLeod Ford |
| 1974 | Australian Drivers' Championship | 9th | Matich A53 Repco Holden | John Goss Racing |
| 1975 | Tasman Series | 6th | Matich A53 Repco Holden | John Goss Racing |
| 1975 | Toby Lee Formula 5000 Series | 2nd | Matich A53 Repco Holden | John Goss Racing |
| 1975 | Australian Drivers' Championship | 13th | Matich A53 Repco Holden | John Goss Racing |
| 1976 | Australian Drivers' Championship | 5th | Matich A53 Repco Holden | John Goss Racing |
| 1976 | Rothmans International Series | 5th | Matich A53 Repco Holden | John Goss Racing |
| 1977 | Rothmans International Series | 4th | Matich A53 Repco Holden | John Goss Racing |
| 1977 | Australian Touring Car Championship | 28th | Ford XB Falcon GT Hardtop; Ford XC Falcon Hardtop | John Goss Racing |
| 1978 | Australian Touring Car Championship | 30th | Ford XC Falcon Hardtop | John Goss Racing |
| 1982 | Australian Endurance Championship | NC | Jaguar XJS | John Goss Racing |
| 1984 | Australian Endurance Championship | NC | Mazda RX-7; Jaguar XJS | Valentine Greetings; John Goss Racing Pty. Ltd. |
| 1985 | Australian Endurance Championship | 10th | Jaguar XJS | JRA Ltd / Jaguar Racing |
| 1986 | Australian Endurance Championship | NC | Jaguar XJS | John Goss Racing |
| 1990 | Australian Endurance Championship | NC | Mercedes-Benz W201 | Phil Ward Racing |

=== Complete Bathurst 500/1000 results ===
| Year | Team | Co-drivers | Car | Class | Laps | Pos. | Class pos. |
|---|---|---|---|---|---|---|---|
| 1969 | (Australia) McLeod Ford Pty Ltd | (Australia) Dennis Cribbin | Ford XW Falcon GTHO | D | 50 | DNF | DNF |
| 1970 | (Australia) McLeod Ford Pty Ltd | (Australia) Bob Skelton | Ford XW Falcon GTHO Phase II | E | 127 | 9th | 3rd |
| 1971 | (Australia) McLeod Ford Pty Ltd | (Australia) Barry Sharp | Ford XY Falcon GTHO Phase III | E | 129 | 6th | 5th |
| 1972 | (Australia) McLeod Ford Pty Ltd | drove solo | Ford XY Falcon GTHO Phase III | D | 24 | DNF | DNF |
| 1973 | (Australia) McLeod Ford | (Australia) Kevin Bartlett | Ford XA Falcon GT Hardtop | D | 110 | DNF | DNF |
| 1974 | (Australia) McLeod Ford - 2UW | (Australia) Kevin Bartlett | Ford XA Falcon GT Hardtop | 3001 – 6000cc | 163 | 1st | 1st |
| 1975 | (Australia) John Goss Racing Pty Ltd | (Australia) Kevin Bartlett | Ford XB Falcon GT Hardtop | D | 10 | DNF | DNF |
| 1976 | (Australia) John Goss Racing Pty Ltd | (New Zealand) Jim Richards | Ford XB Falcon GT Hardtop | 3001cc - 6000cc | 129 | DNF | DNF |
| 1977 | (Australia) John Goss Racing Pty Limited | (France) Henri Pescarolo | Ford XC Falcon GS500 Hardtop | 3001cc - 6000cc | 113 | DNF | DNF |
| 1978 | (Australia) John Goss Pty Ltd | (France) Henri Pescarolo | Ford XC Falcon GS500 Hardtop | A | 67 | DNF | DNF |
| 1979 | (Australia) John Goss P/L | (France) Henri Pescarolo | Ford XC Falcon GS500 Hardtop | A | 118 | DNF | DNF |
| 1980 | (Australia) John Goss Pty Ltd | (Australia) Ron Gillard | Jaguar XJS | 3001-6000cc | 14 | DNF | DNF |
| 1981 | (Australia) John Goss Racing | (Australia) Barry Seton | Jaguar XJS | 8 Cylinder & Over | 73 | DNF | DNF |
| 1982 | (Australia) John Goss Racing | (United States) Bob Tullius | Jaguar XJS | A | 119 | DNF | DNF |
| 1984 | (Australia) John Goss Racing | (United Kingdom) Tom Walkinshaw | Jaguar XJS | Group C | 0 | DNF | DNF |
| 1985 | (United Kingdom) JRA Ltd / Jaguar Racing | (West Germany) Armin Hahne | Jaguar XJS | C | 163 | 1st | 1st |
| 1986 | (Australia) John Goss Racing | (Australia) Bob Muir | Jaguar XJS | C | 140 | DNF | DNF |
| 1989 | (Australia) Peter Jackson Racing | (Australia) Glenn Seton (Australia) Tony Noske | Ford Sierra RS500 | A | 140 | 20th | 17th |
| 1990 | (Australia) Phil Ward Racing | (Australia) Phil Ward | Mercedes-Benz 190E | 2 | 148 | 12th | 1st |

=== Complete 24 Hours of Le Mans results ===
| Year | Team | Co-drivers | Car | Class | Laps | Pos. | Class pos. |
|---|---|---|---|---|---|---|---|
| 1976 | (Belgium) "Beurlys" | (Belgium) John Blaton (United Kingdom) Nick Faure | Porsche 934 | GT | 168 | DNF | DNF |

Sporting positions
| Preceded by Allan Moffat; Ian Geoghegan | Winner of the Bathurst 1000; 1974 (with Kevin Bartlett) | Succeeded by Peter Brock; Brian Sampson |
| Preceded by Max Stewart | Winner of the Australian Grand Prix; 1976 | Succeeded by Warwick Brown |
| Preceded by Peter Brock; Larry Perkins | Winner of the Bathurst 1000; 1985 (with Armin Hahne) | Succeeded by Allan Grice; Graeme Bailey |
