= 1969 Australian Sports Car Championship =

Seasons
- ← none 1970 →

The 1969 Australian Sports Car Championship was a CAMS sanctioned Australian motor racing title open to Group A Sports Cars, Group B Improved Production Sports Cars and Group D Series Production Sports Cars. It was the inaugural Australian Sports Car Championship, replacing the Australian Tourist Trophy as Australia's premier Sports Car contest.

The championship was won by Frank Matich driving a Matich SR4 Repco.

== Schedule ==
The championship was contested over three heats with one race per heat.

Heat	Race name	Circuit	Date	Heat winner	Car
1	RAC Trophy	Warwick Farm	4 May	Frank Matich	Matich SR4
2	Queensland Sports Car Championship	Surfers Paradise International Race Circuit	18 May	Frank Matich	Matich SR4
3	Trans Australian Trophy Race	Sandown	9 November	Frank Matich	Matich SR4 Repco

== Points system ==
Championship points were awarded on a 9-6-4-3-2-1 basis to the first six placegetters at each heat.

== Results ==
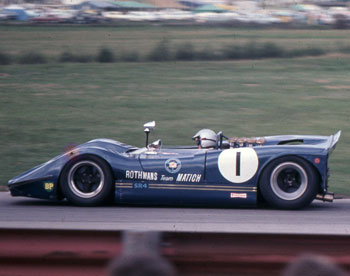
Frank Matich in the Matich SR4 Repco at the Surfers Paradise round of the championship

Position	Driver	Car	Entrant	War.	Sur.	San.	Total
1	Frank Matich	Matich SR4 Repco	Rothmans Team Matich	9	9	9	27
2	Don O'Sullivan	Matich SR3 Repco	Don O'Sullivan Racing	6	6	4	16
3	Bob Muir	Lotus 23B Ford	Civil Flying School	3	4	2	9
4	John Harvey	McLaren Repco	Bob Jane Racing	-	-	6	6
5	Bob Beasley	Lotus 47	Robert Beasley Motors	2	3	-	5
6	Neil Allen	Elfin 400 Chevrolet	NE Allen Competition	4	-	-	4
7	Peter Woodward	Elfin 350 Coventry Climax	Woodward Racing	-	-	3	3
8	Tony Oxley	Chevron B8 BMW	Anthony Oxley	-	2	-	2
9	Doug Macarthur	Lotus Elan	Mayfair Motors	1	-	-	1
=	John Goss	Tornado Ford	John Goss	-	1	-	1
=	Malcolm Ramsay	Elfin 300 Ford	Elfin Sports Cars	-	-	1	1
