= 1970 Australian Sports Car Championship =

Seasons
- ← 1969 1971 →

The 1970 Australian Sports Car Championship was an Australian motor racing competition for Group A Sports Cars, Group B Improved Production Sports Cars and Group D Series Production Sports Cars. It was authorised by the Confederation of Australian Motor Sport as an Australian National Title.

The title, which was the second Australian Sports Car Championship, was won by Peter Woodward, driving an Elfin 350 Coventry Climax.

== Schedule ==
The championship was contested over three heats with one race per heat.

- Heat 1, Endeavour Cup, Phillip Island, Victoria, 25 January
- Heat 2, RAC Trophy, Warwick Farm, New South Wales, 3 May
- Heat 3, Western Australian Sports Car Championship, Wanneroo Park, Western Australia, 16 August

== Points system ==
Championship points were awarded on a 9-6-4-3-2-1 basis to the first six placegetters at each heat.

== Championship standings ==
Position	Driver	No.	Car	Entrant	Phi.	War.	Wan.	Total
1	Peter Woodward	47 & 3	Elfin 350 Coventry Climax	Woodward Racing	9	-	6	15
2	Phillip Moore	6 & 15	Elfin 300C Ford	PC Moore	6	4	3	13
3	Niel Allen	2	Elfin ME5 Chevrolet	NE Allen Auto. Ind.	-	9	-	9
=	Howie Sangster	4	Lola T70 Mk2 Ford	Pinocchios Racing	-	-	9	9
5	Frank Matich	1	Matich SR4 Repco	Rothmans Team Matich	-	6	-	6
6	Peter Larner	34	Lotus 23B	Civil Flying School	4	-	-	4
=	Stan Starcevich	5	Graduate Mk 2 Ford	S Starcevich	-	-	4	4
8	Bob Jane	3	Ford Mustang	Bob Jane Shell Racing Team	3	-	-	3
=	Dennis Uhrhane		Elfin 300 Ford	Total Morwell Service Station	-	3	-	3
10	Charlie Occhipinti	35	Elfin Mallala	C Occhipinti	2	-	-	2
=	John Goss	12	Tornado Ford	McLeod Ford	-	2	-	2
=	Dick Murphy	47	Bolwell Mk 7	R Murphy	-	-	2	2
13	Bill Peacock	48	Pegasus	WR Peacock	1	-	-	1
=	Bob Martin		Hustler SC1 Ford	Robert Martin	-	1	-	1
=	Murray Charnley	51	Lotus 23	M Charnley	-	-	1	1
