= 1972 South Pacific Touring Series =

The 1972 South Pacific Touring Series was an Australian motor racing competition for Group E Series Production Touring Cars. It was the third running of an annual series which had first been contested as the 1970 Tasman Touring Series.

The series was won by John Goss driving for McLeod Ford in a Ford Falcon GTHO.

== Schedule ==
The series was contested over four rounds:

| Round | Race name | Circuit | Date | Winning driver | Winning car | Entrant |
| 1 | | Surfers Paradise International Raceway | 6 February | Leo Geoghegan | Chrysler Valiant Charger | Austral Motors |
| 2 | Tele-Ads Series Production Touring Car Race | Warwick Farm Motor Racing Circuit | 13 February | Doug Chivas | Chrysler Valiant Charger | Liverpool Chrysler |
| 3 | Autolite South Pacific Tourist Trophy Race | Sandown International Motor Race Circuit | 20 February | John Goss | Ford Falcon GTHO | McLeod Ford |
| 4 | | Adelaide International Raceway | 27 February | Allan Moffat | Ford Falcon GTHO | Ford Motor Company of Australia Ltd. |

Each round was held as a support race to a round of the 1972 Tasman Championship for Drivers.

== Classes ==
Competing cars were classified into four classes according to an assessed C.P. Units value for each vehicle. Under this system, the engine capacity of the car (in litres) was multiplied by the retail price of the car (in Australian dollars) to arrive at a CP Unit value.

- Class A: 0 to 3000 C.P. Units
- Class B: 3001 to 9000 C.P. Units
- Class C: 9001 to 18000 C.P. Units
- Class D: 18001 & over C.P. Units

== Points system ==
Points were awarded on a 4,3,2,1 basis for the first four outright places at each round. In addition, points were awarded on a 9,8,7,6,5,4,3,2,1 basis for the first nine places in each class at each round.

Points were only awarded to a driver conditional upon them competing in the same make and model of car entered by the same entrant in all four rounds of the series. The series win was awarded to a driver and entrant, who both received equal recognition.

== Series standings ==
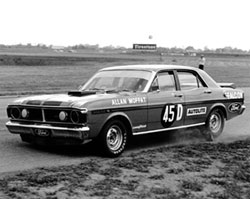
Allan Moffat placed second driving a Ford Falcon GTHO for the Ford Motor Company of Australia Ltd.

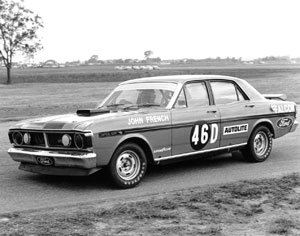
John French placed tenth driving a Ford Falcon GTHO for the Ford Motor Company of Australia Ltd.

| Pos. | Driver / Entrant | Car | Points |
| 1 | John Goss / McLeod Ford | Ford Falcon GTHO | 45 |
| 2 | Allan Moffat / Ford Motor Company of Australia Ltd. | Ford Falcon GTHO | 39 |
| 3 | Eric Olsen / Eric Olsen | Ford Escort Twin Cam | 32 |
| 4 | Alan Whitchurch / P. J. Motors Pty. Ltd. | Chrysler Valiant Galant | 29 |
| = | Peter Brock / Holden Dealer Team | Holden Torana GTR XU-1 | 29 |
| 6 | Colin Bond / Holden Dealer Team | Holden Torana GTR XU-1 | 28 |
| 7 | John Piper / John Piper | Ford Escort Twin Cam | 25 |
| 8 | Leo Geoghegan / Austral Motors | Chrysler Valiant Charger | 24 |
| 9 | Roger Bonhomme / Collins Chrysler | Chrysler Valiant Galant | 20 |
| 10 | John French / Ford Motor Company of Australia Ltd. | Ford Falcon GTHO | 19 |
| 11 | Mel Mollison / Bainbridge Motors | Mazda 1300 | 16 |
| 12 | Bob Forbes / Boyded (Randwick) Pty. Ltd. | Holden Torana GTR | 14 |

- Note: The above table shows only the top twelve placings in the series.
