= John Goss Special =

Ford XB Falcon John Goss Special
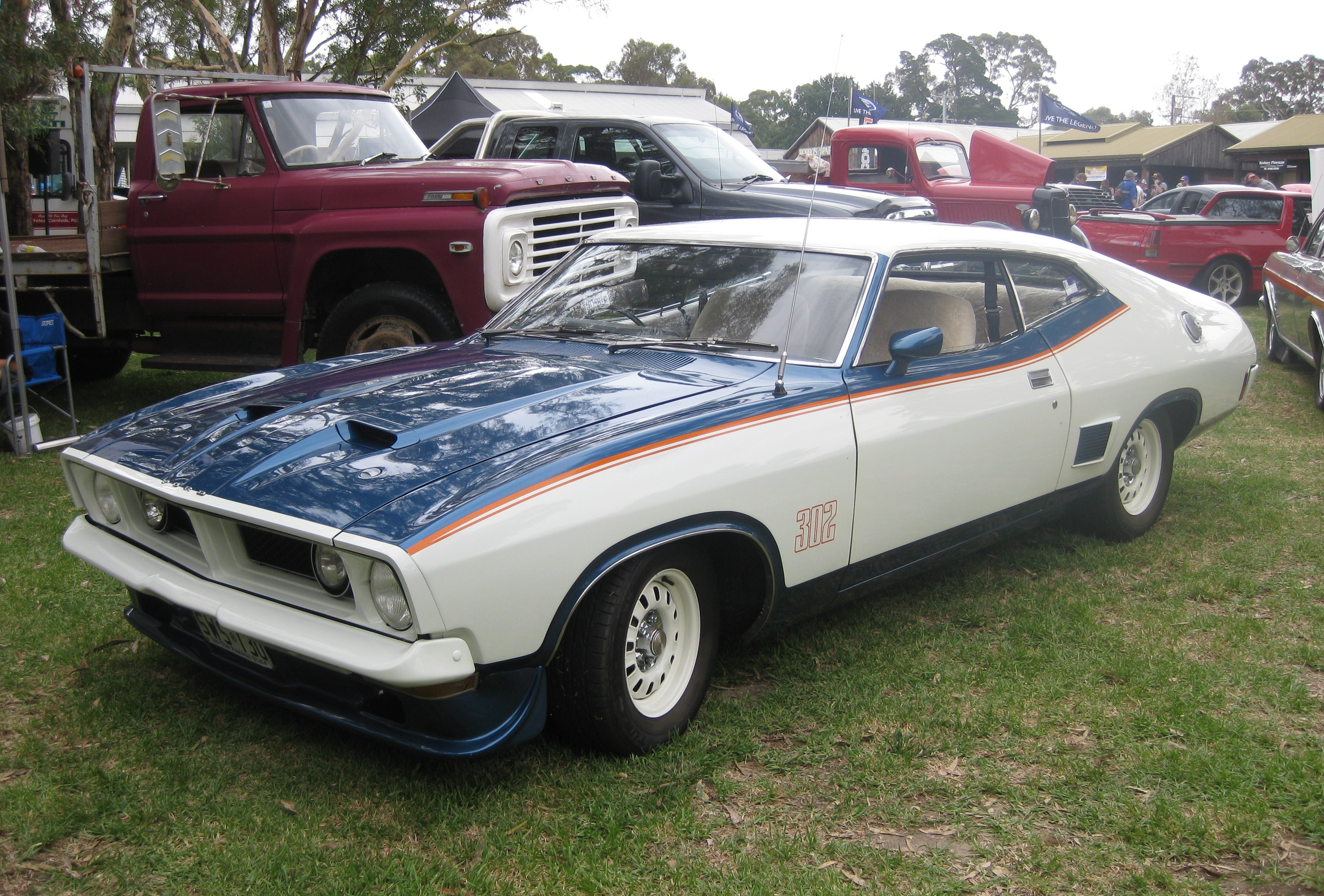
- Ford XB Falcon Hardtop "John Goss Special"

Overview
- Manufacturer: Ford Australia
- Production: 1975-1976
- Assembly: Broadmeadows

Body and chassis
- Class: Muscle car
- Body style: 2-door Hardtop
- Layout: FR layout
- Related: Ford XB Falcon

Powertrain
- Transmission: 4-speed manual 3-speed floor-mounted automatic

The John Goss Special was a limited edition of the Ford Falcon released by Ford Australia in August 1975 to commemorate John Goss' win in the prestigious Bathurst 1000 endurance race the previous year.

The car was based on the XB Falcon 500 Hardtop and featured a 302 in³ (4.9 L) Cleveland V8, and some specific options including the GS Rally Pack which featured full dash instrumentation, a 3-spoke steering wheel, vented bonnet (hood) with locking pins, and 12-slot steel road wheels. A separate item featured on all John Goss Special hardtops were the cosmetic side body vents that were also a feature of contemporary Falcon GT hardtops.

The John Goss Special cars were available in a choice of two accent colours, Apollo Blue metallic or Emerald Fire (green) metallic, offset against the predominant body colour of Polar White. The metallic paint (specified on the cars' compliance plates) covered the bonnet, engine bay, chassis, and feature sections on the 'A' pillar and waistline, as well as the lower sill sections and the rear feature panel between the tail-lights. Unlike other GS Rally Pack cars, the road wheels were painted in complementary Polar White, as were the bumper bars and the front grille assembly. Interior trim was white vinyl, contrasted against a black dashboard and black floor carpet.

A factory Dealer Bulletin (dated 30 July 1975) released to Ford dealers stated that all "minor Falcon 500 options" were available to order on the John Goss Special, and there is evidence of some cars featuring a Limited Slip Differential. The 302ci V8 was the only available engine, but this could be had with either a 4-speed manual or 3-speed automatic floor-mounted transmission. A central floor Sports Console was a specified mandatory option, as was Sports Handling Suspension with 185 section steel-belted radial tyres.

Some Ford dealers such as McLeod Ford in Sydney (well-known at the time for their Horn cars) chose to add accessories such as front and rear spoilers, and/or to modify the interior seating to feature colourful cloth or vinyl inserts.

Ford's records show that 700 John Goss Special XB Hardtops were built, however, how many remain is unknown. Ford made an initial build of 400 units in July 1975 that sold out quickly and gave them the confidence to do a second run of cars which produced the remaining 300 units in September, October and November 1975, as mentioned in Motor Manual magazine (January 1976).

The official records show that 386 were 4-speed manuals and 314 3-speed T-bar auto.

371 were painted in Apollo Blue (Paint code "S") 329 were painted in Emerald Fire (Paint code "Q")

Of those 371 Apollo Blue JGS - 193 were manual and 178 auto. Of those 329 Emerald Fire JGS - 193 were again manual and 136 auto.

All 700 featured the white trim.

The paint codes used were unique to the JGS however soon after production of the JGS ended Ford reused those colour codes which at times caused some confusion when owners took their JGS to a panel shop to be restored. in 1976 Ford used paint code "S" for Satin Brown and paint code "Q" for Coolmint green.

The John Goss Special has become popular among 'Australian muscle car' collectors despite not gaining the press or publicity of other limited edition Falcon cars such as the GT-HO (1969-1971) and the Cobra (1978).
