= Ford Falcon (XB) =

Australian full-size car

Ford Falcon (XB) Ford Futura (XB) Ford Fairmont (XB)
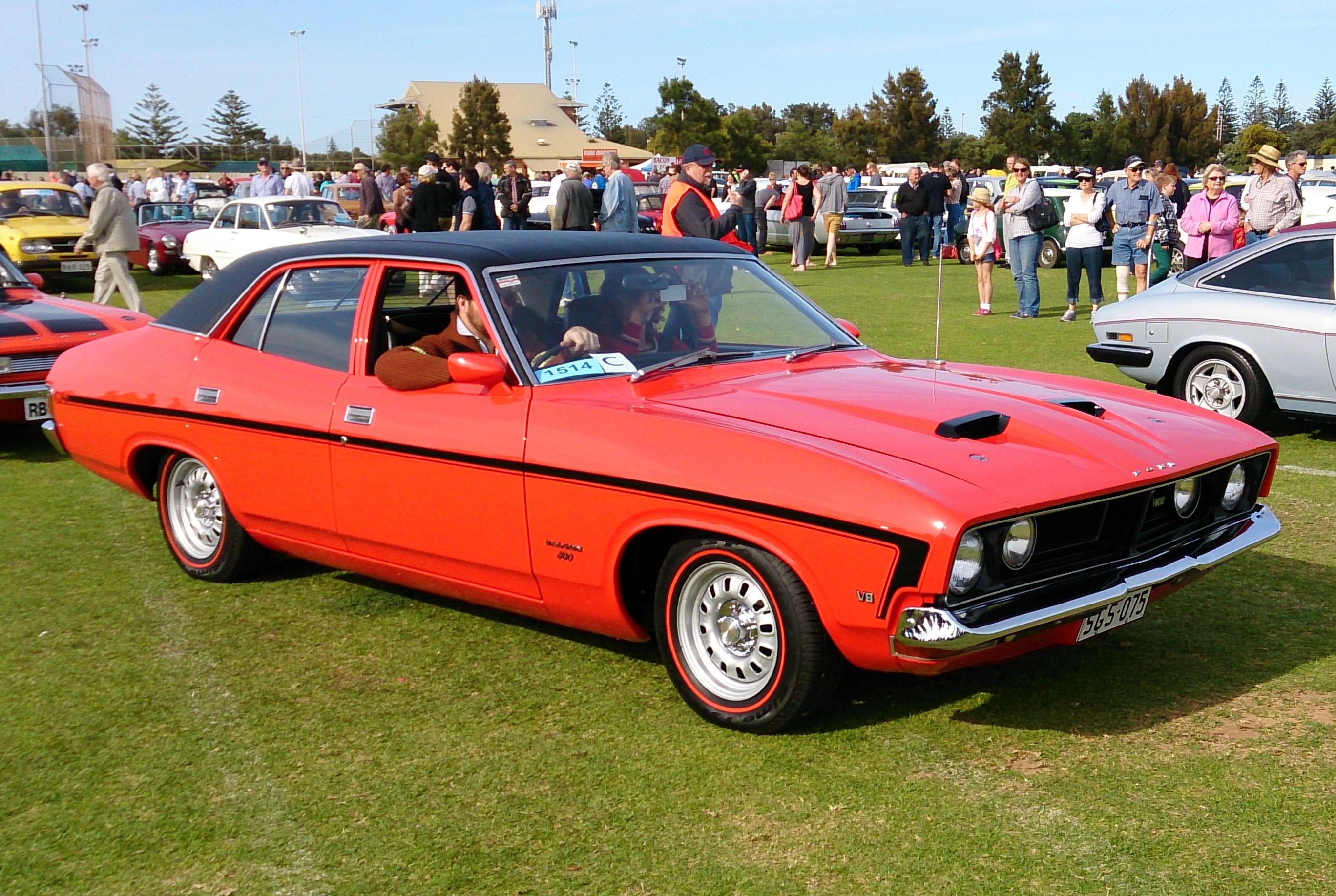
- Ford Falcon 500 (XB) sedan with GS Rally Pack

Overview
- Manufacturer: Ford Australia
- Production: September 1973 – July 1976
- Assembly: Broadmeadows
- Designer: Wayne Draper

Body and chassis
- Class: Full-size car
- Body style: 4 door sedan 5 door station wagon 2 door hardtop 2 door coupe utility 2 door panel van

Powertrain
- Engine: 200ci 6-cyl (3.3L); 250ci 6-cyl (4.1L); 302ci V8 (4.9L); 351ci V8 (5.8L)
- Transmission: 3spd manual (column); 4spd manual (floor); 3spd auto (column & floor)

Dimensions
- Wheelbase: 2,819 mm (111.0 in)
- Length: 4,808 mm (189.3 in)
- Width: 1,900 mm (74.8 in)
- Height: 1,369 mm (53.9 in)
- Kerb weight: 1,394 kg (3,073.2 lb)

Chronology
- Predecessor: Ford Falcon (XA)
- Successor: Ford Falcon (XC)

The Ford Falcon (XB) is a full-size car that was produced by Ford Australia from 1973 to 1976. It was the second iteration of the third generation of the Falcon and also included the Ford Fairmont (XB), the luxury-oriented version.

== Overview ==
The XB series bore minor cosmetic differences to the preceding model, the XA, aimed at giving the car a more muscular stance. First time equipment offerings included standard front disc brakes on all models and an available carpeted interior.

== Model range ==
The XB Falcon range included the following models:

Model	Body	200-1	250-1	302-2	351-2	351-4
Falcon	Sedan	●	●	●	?	−
Falcon	Wagon	?	?	?	?	−
Falcon	Utility	●	●	●	●	−
Falcon	Van	●	●	●	−	−
Falcon 500	Sedan	●	●	●	●	−
Falcon 500	Wagon	●	●	●	−	−
Falcon 500	Hardtop	●	●	●	●	−
Falcon 500	Utility	●	●	●	●	−
Falcon 500	Van	●	●	●	−	−
Futura	Sedan	−	●	●	●	−
Fairmont	Sedan	−	●	●	●	−
Fairmont	Wagon	−	●	●	−	−
Fairmont	Hardtop	−	●	●	●	−
Falcon GT	Sedan	−	−	−	−	●
Falcon GT	Hardtop	−	−	−	−	●

A Grand Sport Rally Pack option, which included bonnet scoops, striping, GS insignia and "GT" instrumentation, was available on Falcon 500, Futura and Fairmont models.

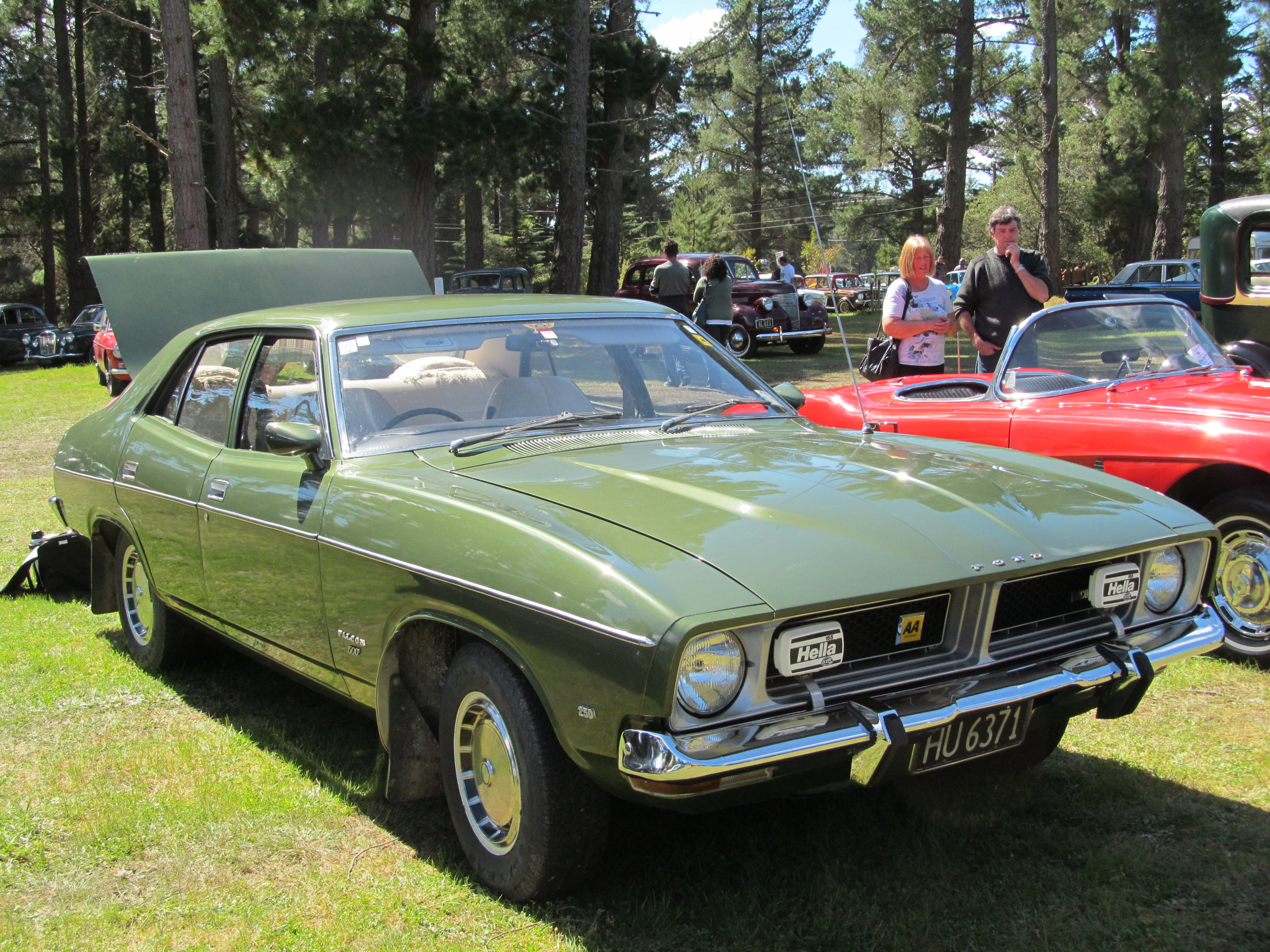
Falcon 500 (XB) sedan

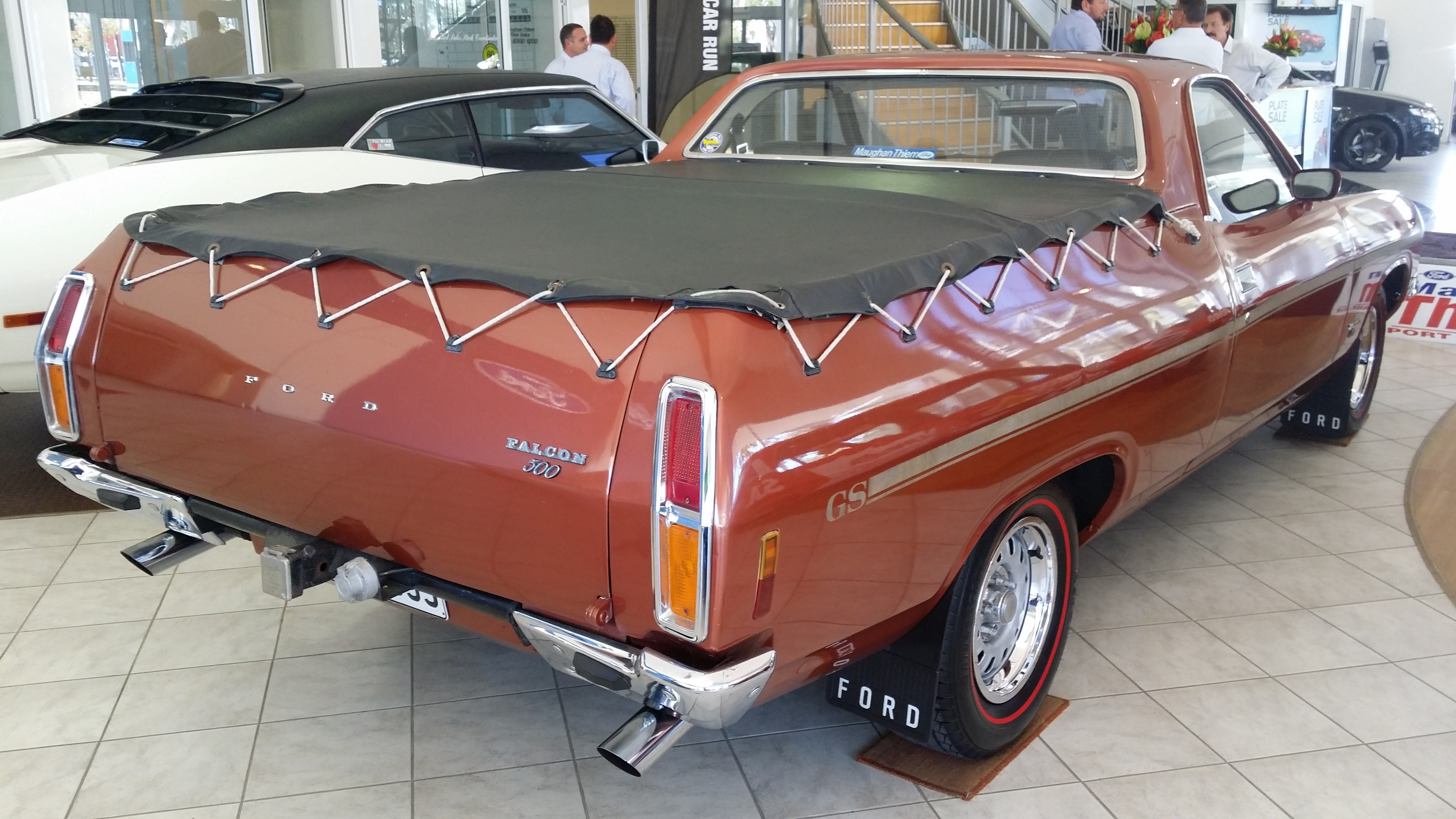
Falcon 500 (XB) Utility with GS Rally Pack

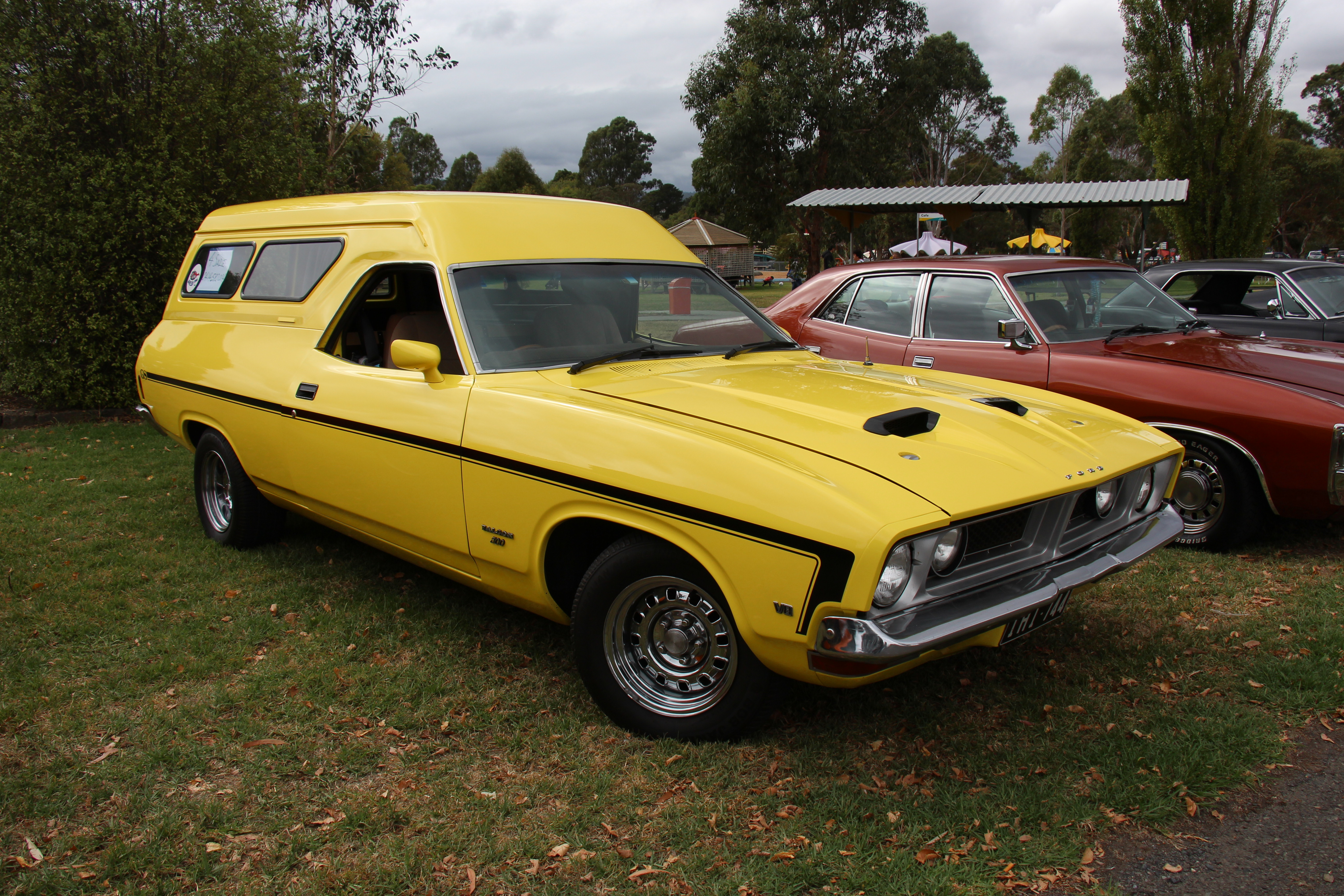
Falcon 500 (XB) Van with GS Rally Pack

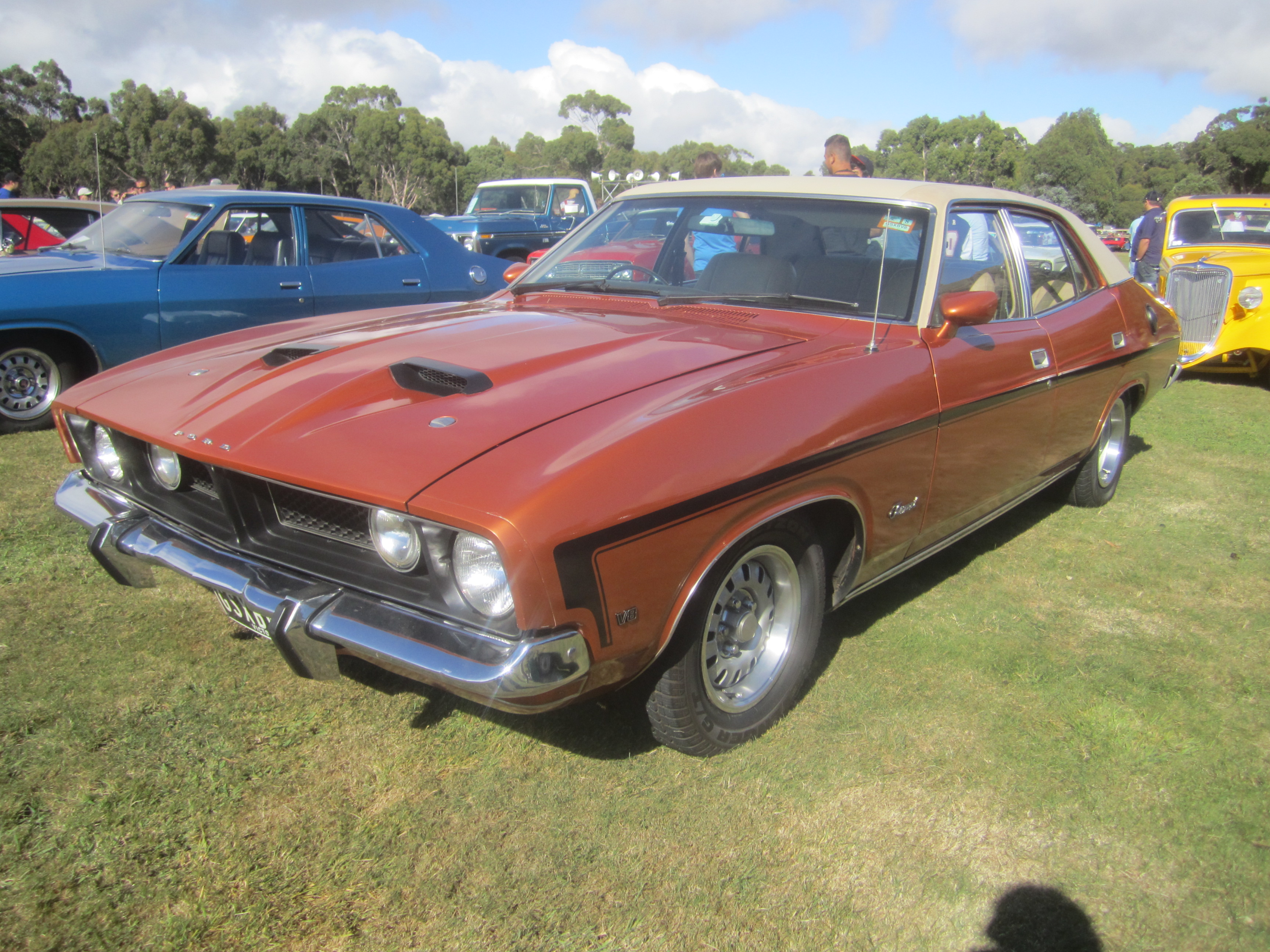
Fairmont (XB) sedan with GS Rally Pack

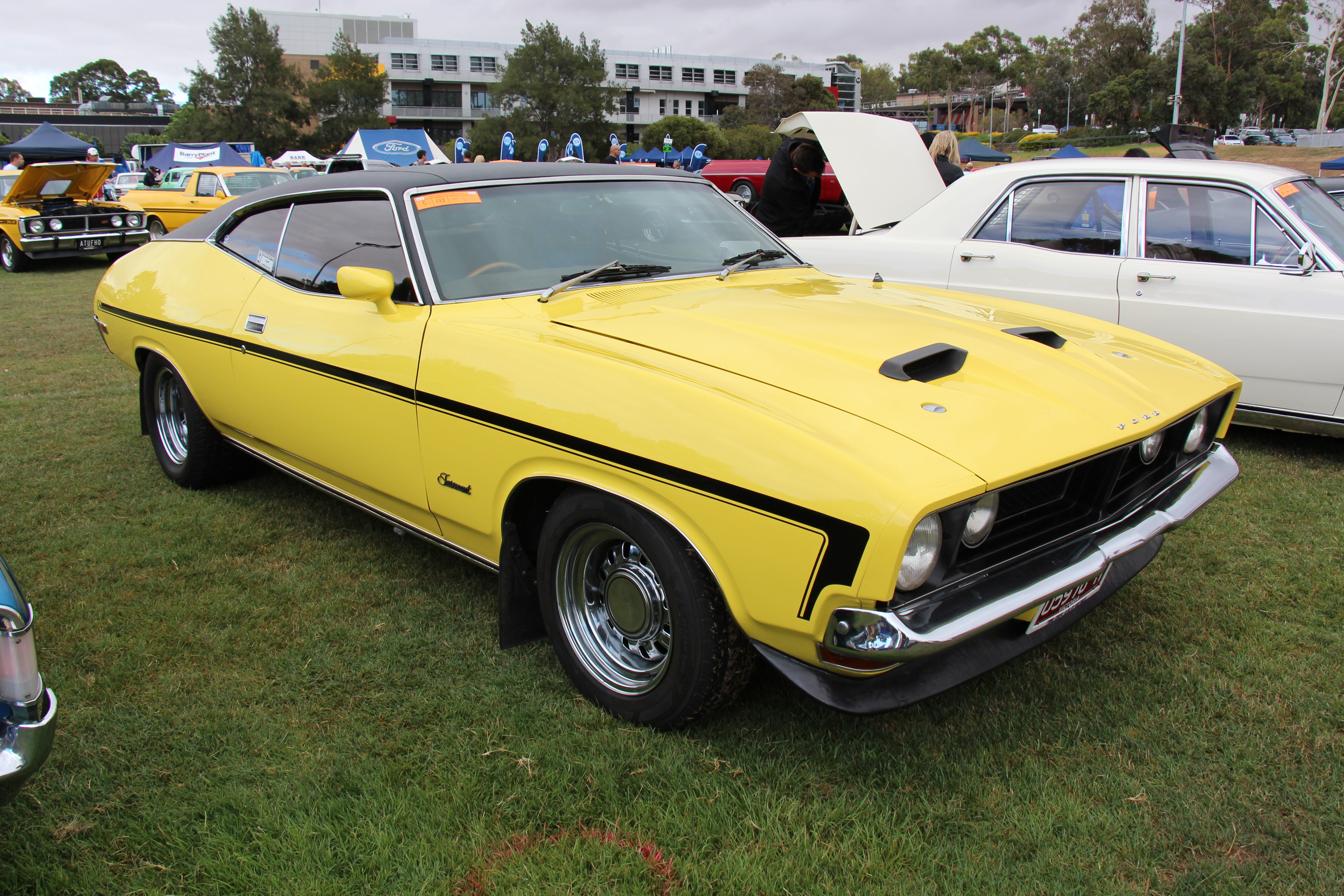
Fairmont (XB) Hardtop with GS Rally Pack

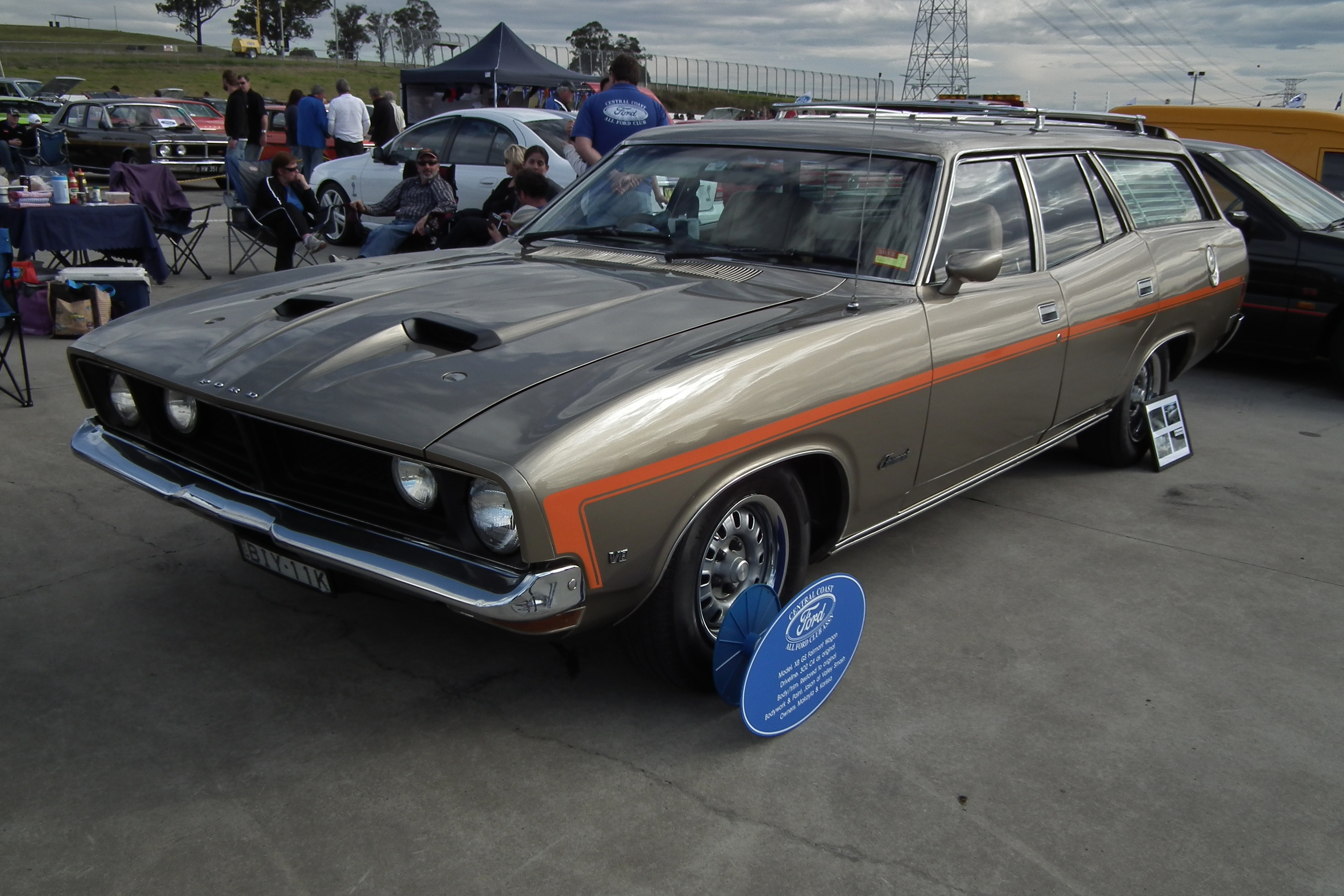
Fairmont (XB) wagon with GS Rally Pack

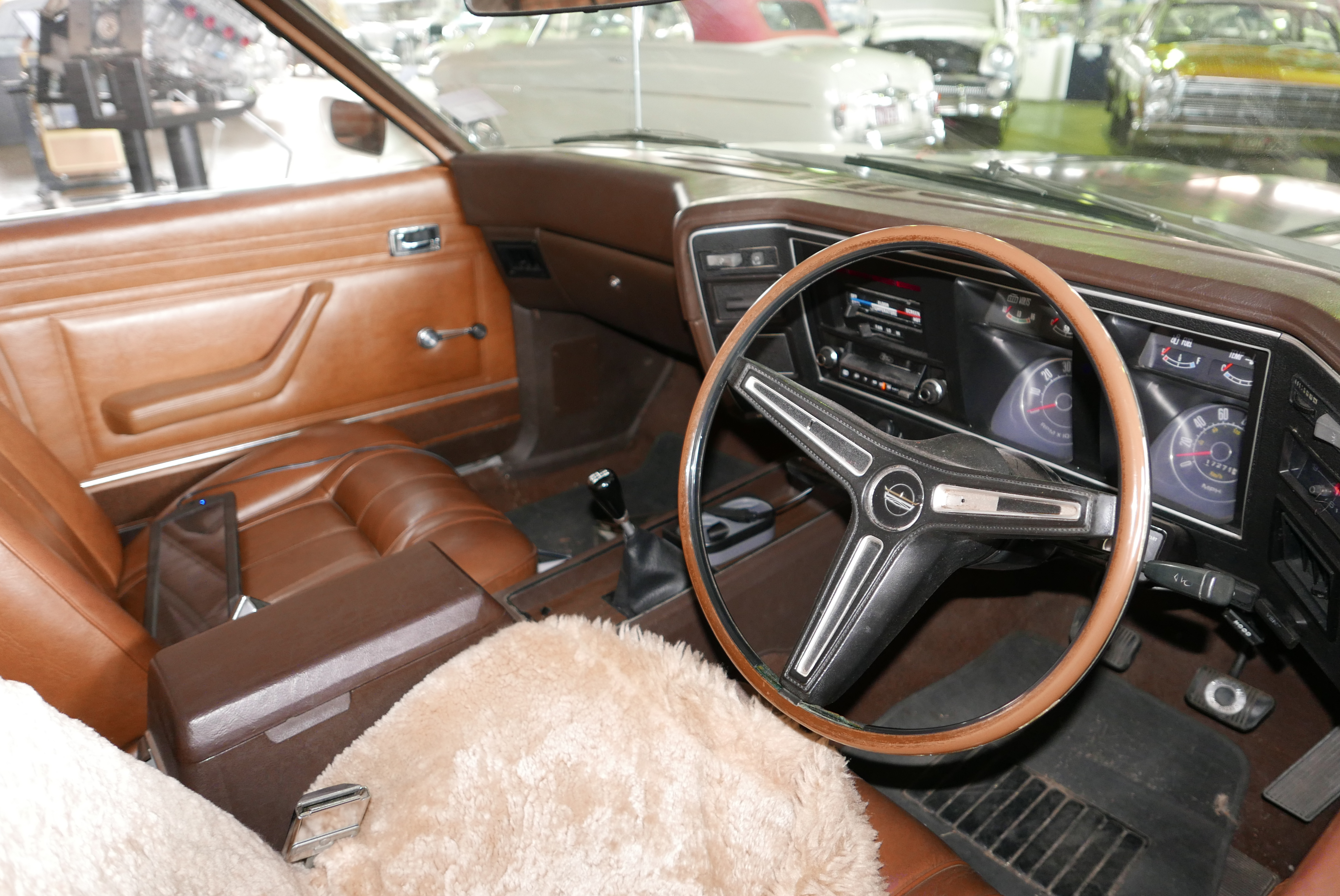
GT Sedan interior

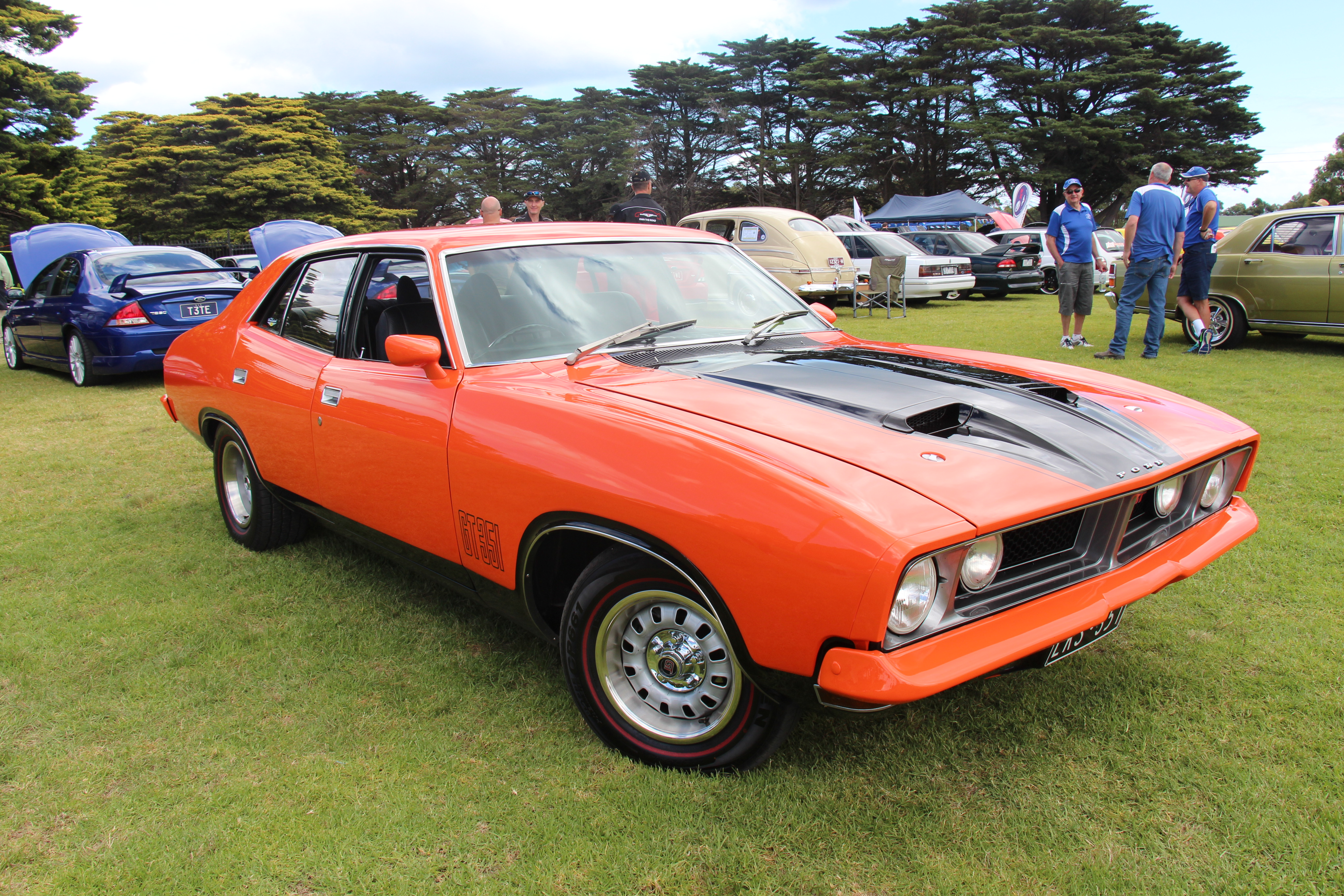
Ford Falcon GT (XB) sedan

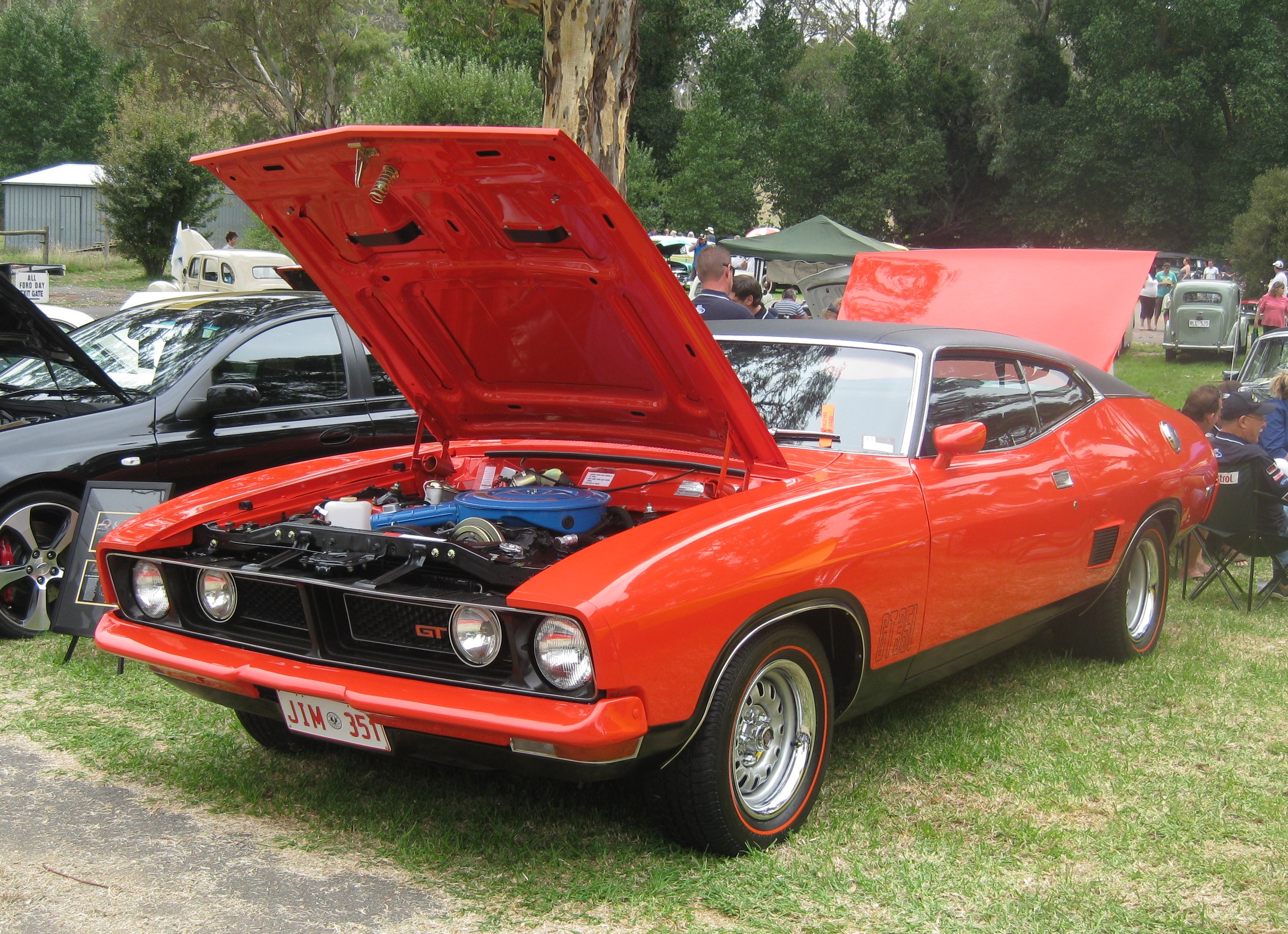
Falcon GT (XB) Hardtop

=== Sovereign Edition ===
In July 1974, a special Falcon Sovereign Edition was released to celebrate Ford Australia's 50th anniversary. It was based on a Falcon 500 fitted, as standard, with a vinyl roof, Fairmont wheel covers, carpet, transistor radio and three thin body stripes. No records were kept on these cars so exact specifications and build quantities are unknown. Production of the Sovereign is believed to have ended in July 1975.

=== John Goss Special ===
Among the limited edition variants of the XB was the John Goss Special, released in 1975 and named for the race driver who took a Falcon to victory in the 1974 Hardie-Ferodo 1000 Touring Car race at Bathurst. These specials were based on the Falcon 500 Hardtop, with decals and other bolt on options, such as the GT Bonnet. They were available in White with a choice of two accent colors: Emerald Fire and Apollo Blue.

=== McLeod Ford "horn" cars ===
Max McLeod owned a Ford dealership in Rockdale, New South Wales, a suburb of Sydney, and sponsored John Goss entered Falcons in the South Pacific Touring Series, ATCC and a number of Bathurst 1000 races. In addition to further modifications to Fords own John Goss Special, McLeod offered the "horn" pack to various Falcon models. These cars are known for their stand-out "strobe" stripes that were applied to the cars, these stripes were the same as used in the McLeod sponsored John Goss racing cars.

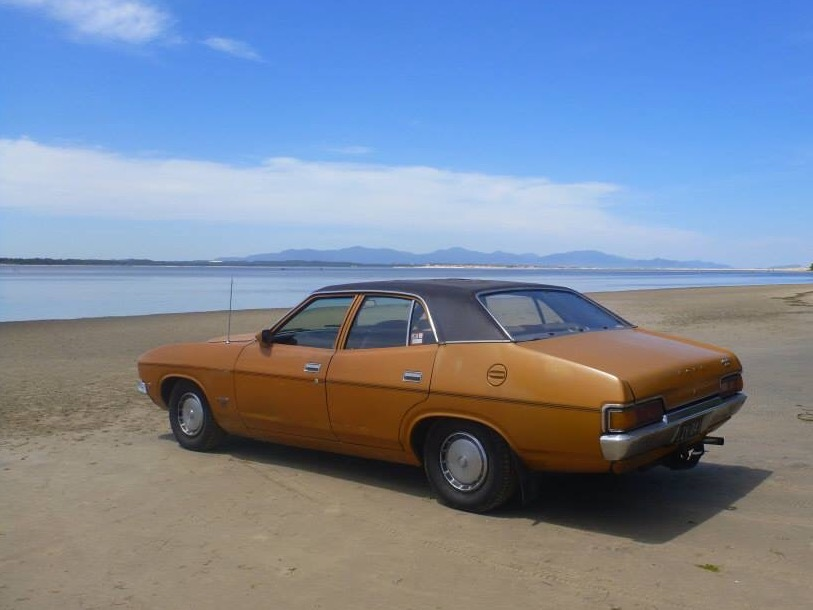
Falcon Sovereign Edition (XB) sedan

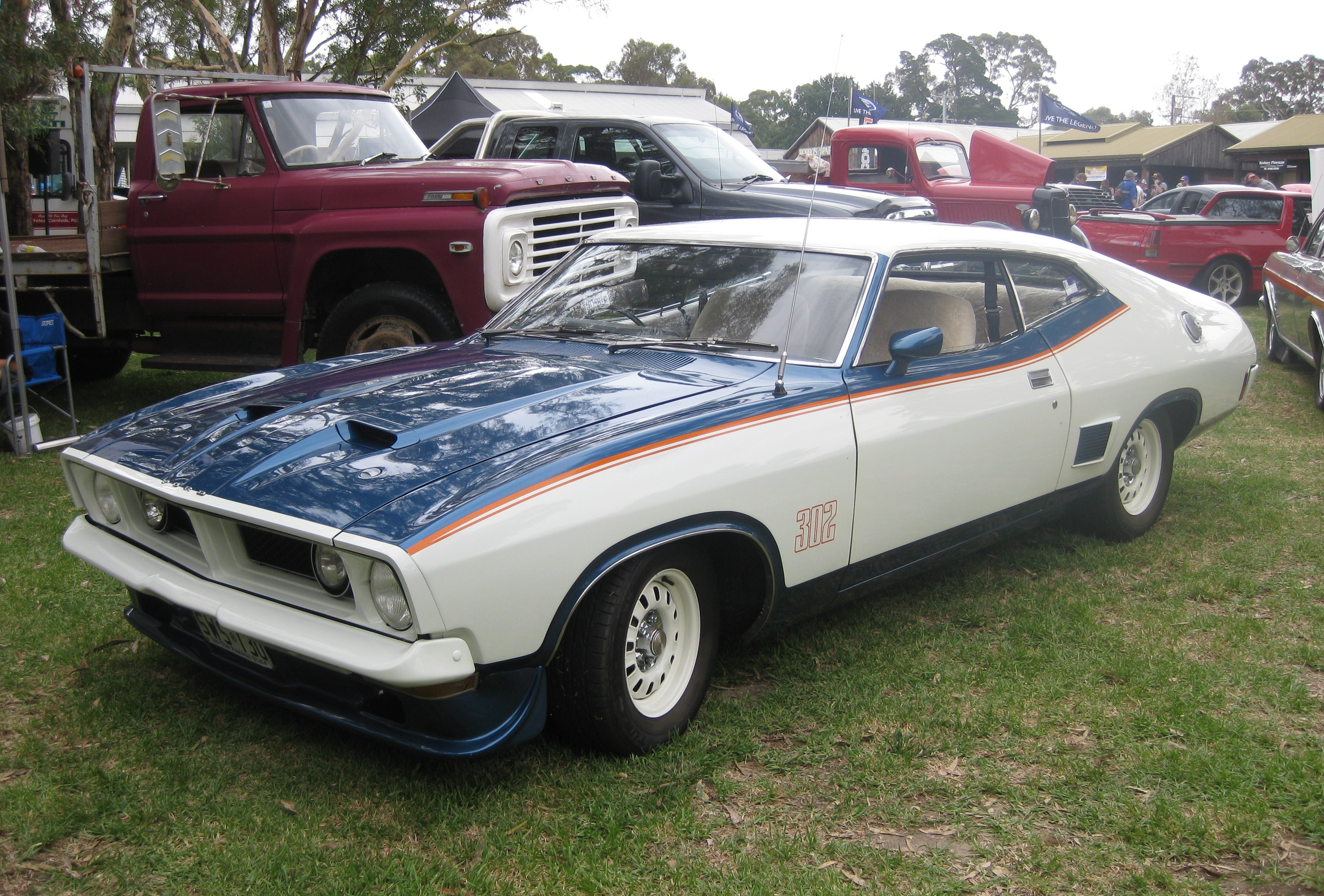
Falcon (XB) Hardtop "John Goss Special"

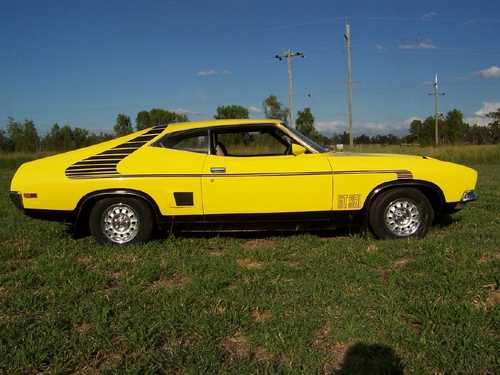
Falcon GT (XB) Hardtop McLeod Ford "Horn car"

== Production ==
Production of the XB series totalled 211,971 vehicles.

XB's production overlapped with Australia's conversion to the metric system, which notably in road traffic took place during July 1974. Early XBs featured dual-scale speedometers with still the mph as dominant, but cars built after the changeover featured only km/h speedometers.

== Motorsport ==
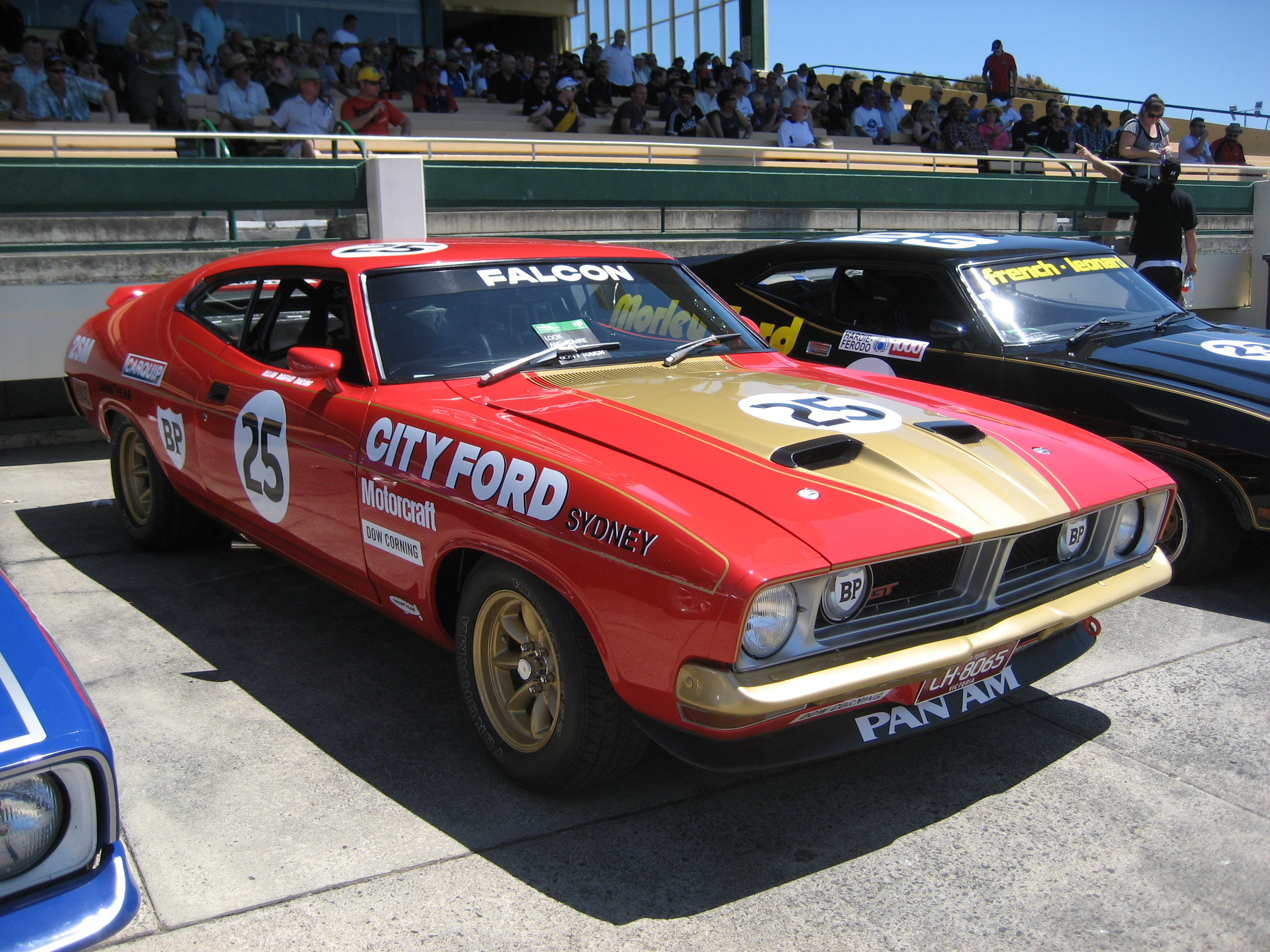
Allan Moffat won the 1976 Australian Touring Car Championship driving a Ford Falcon GT (XB) Hardtop

Allan Moffat won the 1974 Sandown 250 driving an XB Falcon GT Hardtop. He also won the 1976 Australian Touring Car Championship driving an XB Falcon GT Hardtop and drove both an XB Falcon GT Hardtop and an XC Falcon GS Hardtop to win the 1977 Australian Touring Car Championship.

== In film ==
In the 1979 film Mad Max, the title character's black "Pursuit Special" was a 351 cu in (5.8 L) version of a 1973 Ford XB GT Falcon Hardtop. Two 1974 XB sedans were also used as Main Force Patrol Interceptor vehicles. More Falcons were used to depict the Pursuit Special in sequels Mad Max 2 (1981) and Mad Max: Fury Road (2015).

A Falcon GT (XB) Hardtop is the subject of Eric Bana's 2009 documentary film Love the Beast. The film documents the 25-year history of Bana's Falcon, which he purchased at the age of 15.

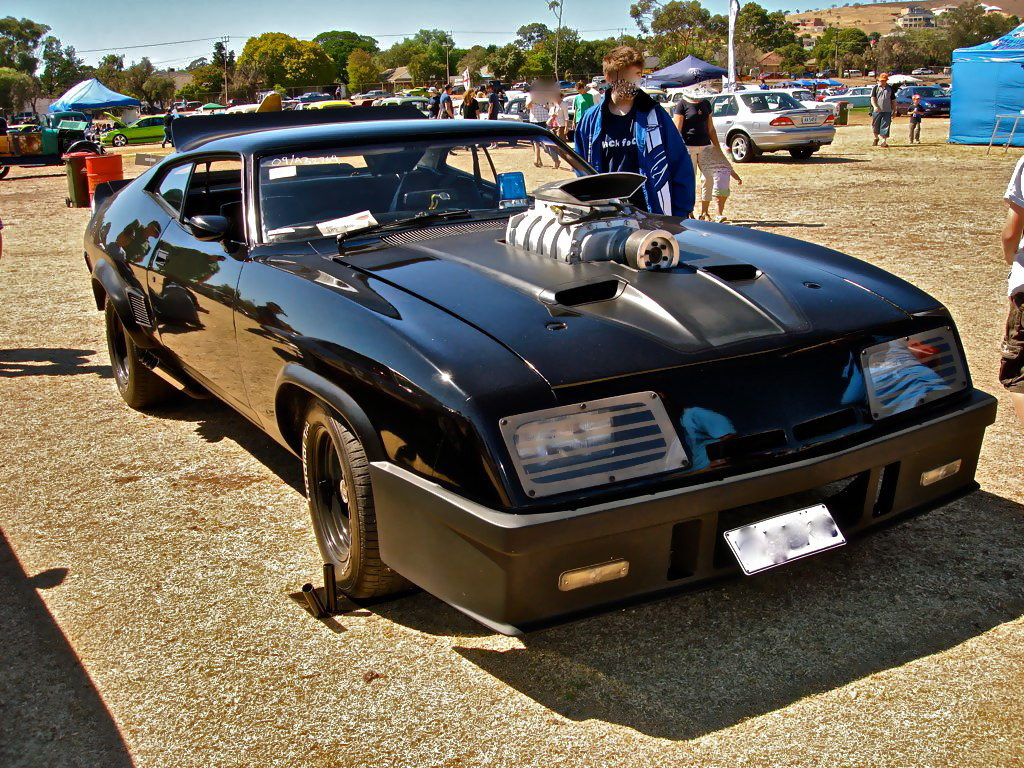
Replica of the Mad Max "Pursuit Special"

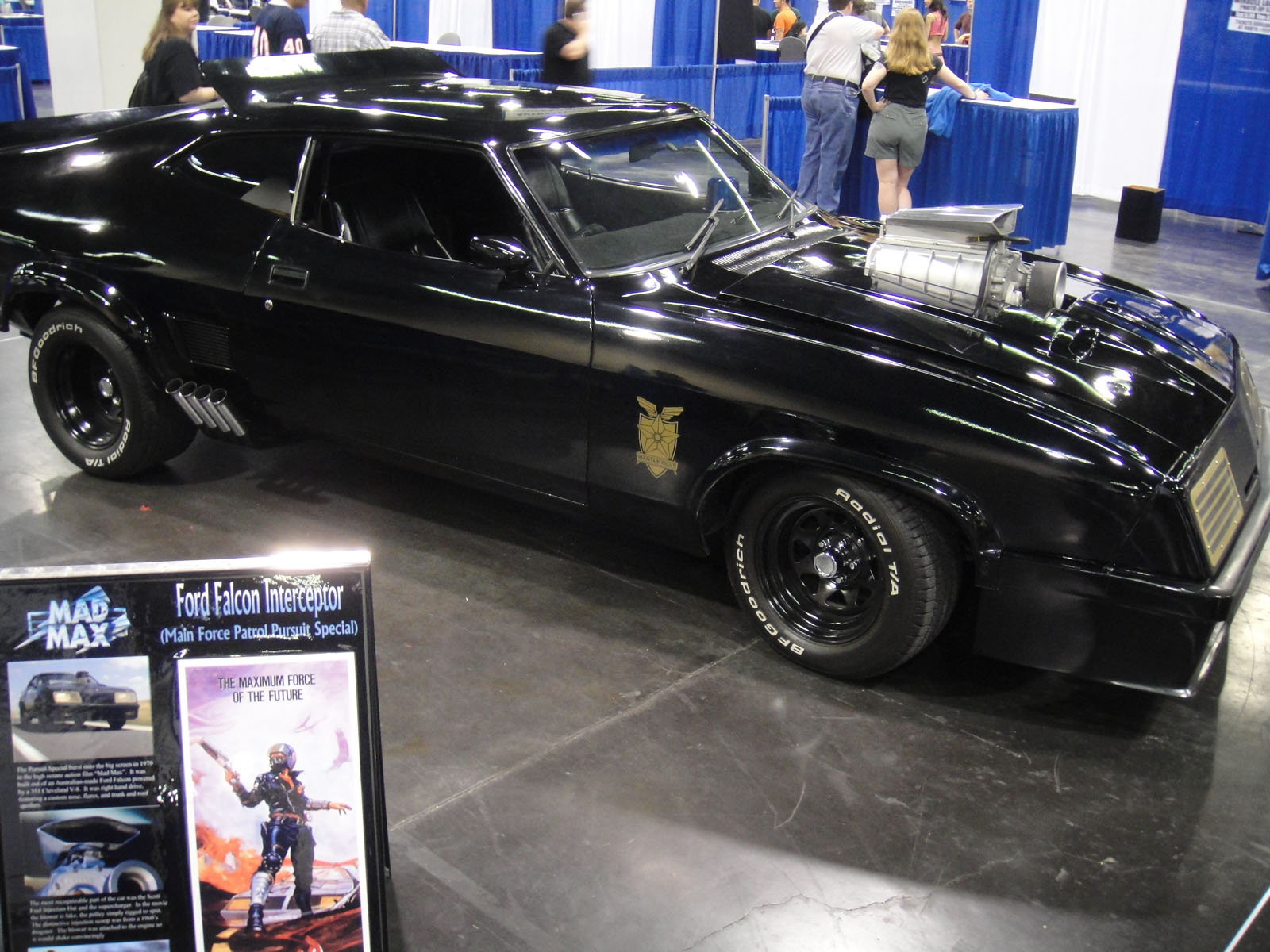
Ford Falcon Mad Max

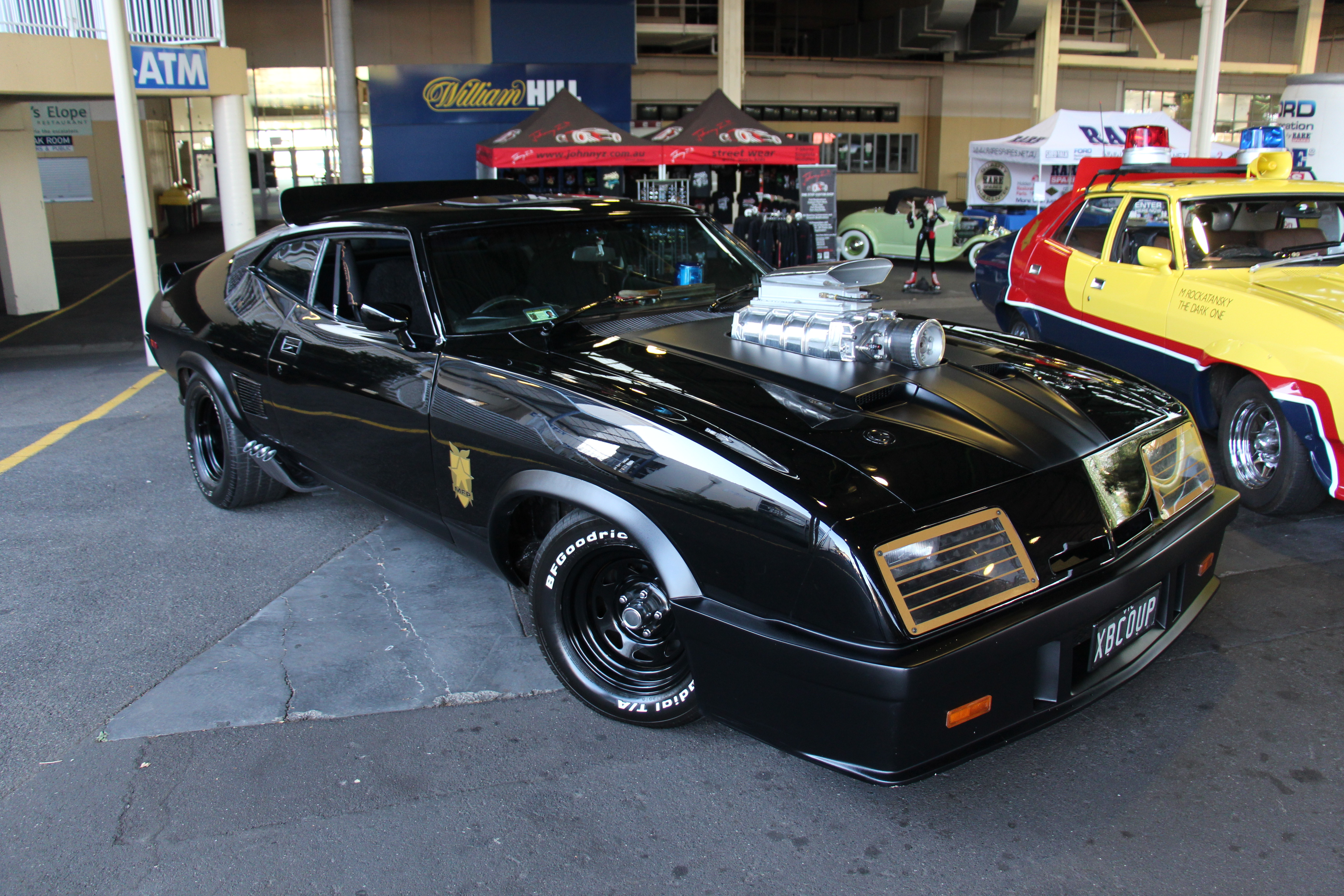
1973 Ford XB Falcon Mad Max Tribute

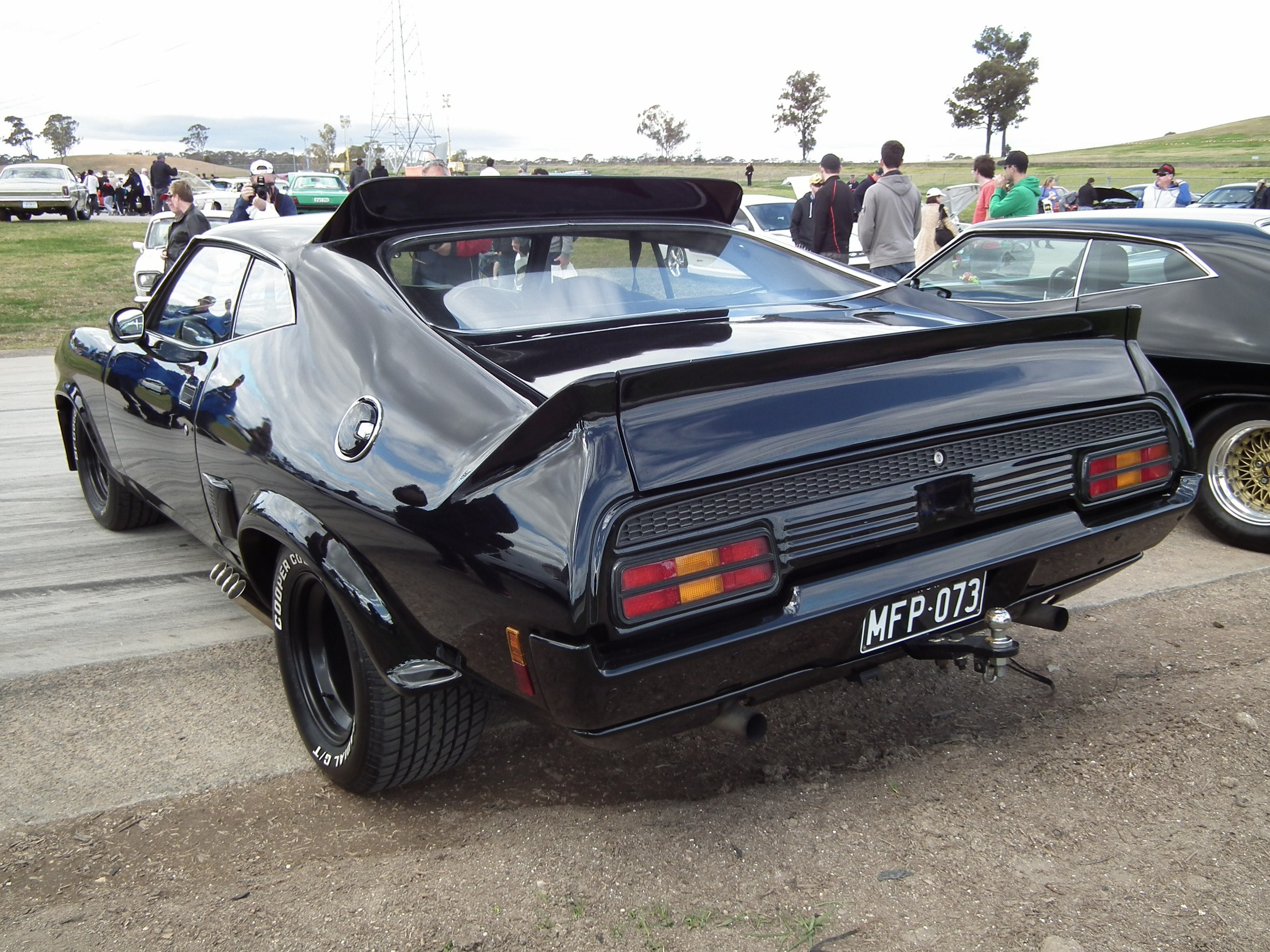
1973 Ford XB Falcon Mad Max rear view

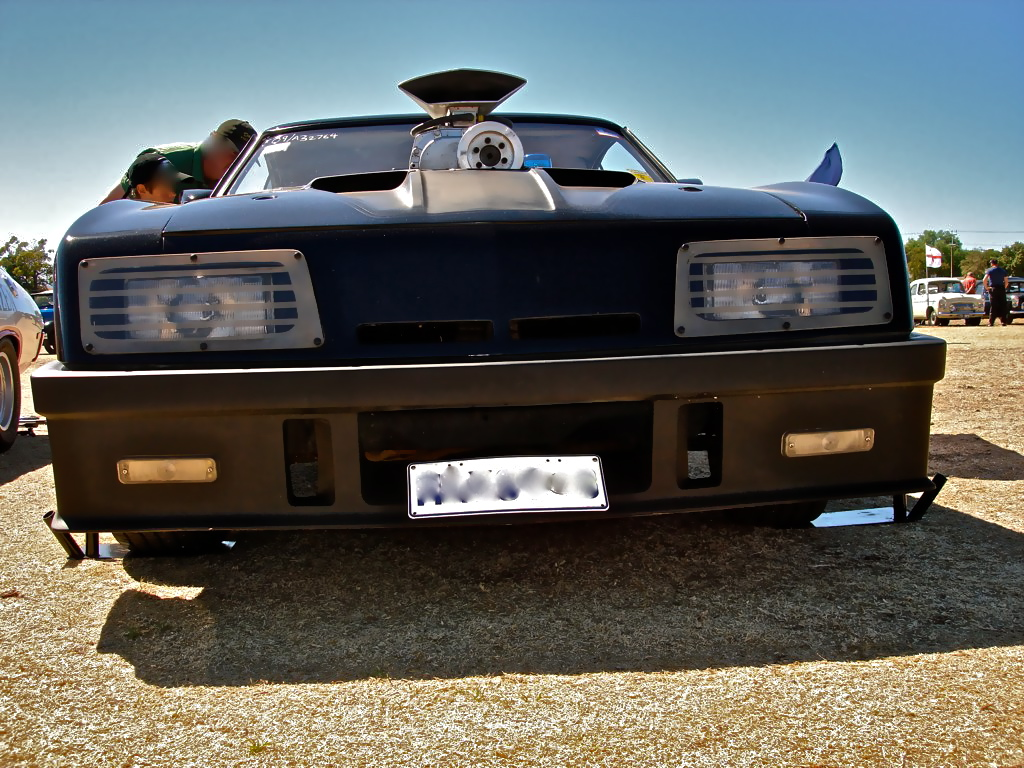
Pursuit Special

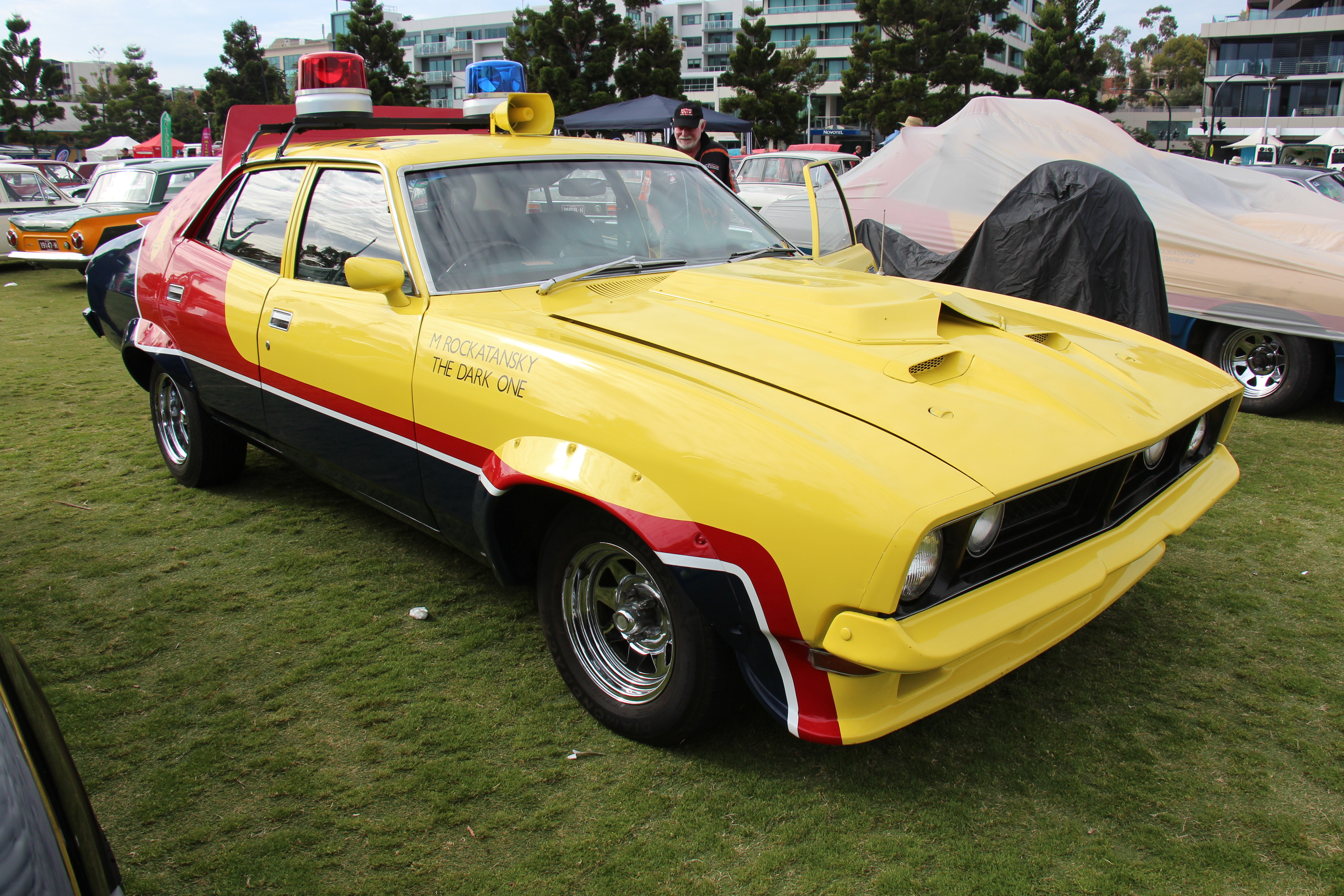
Mad Max Main Force Patrol "Interceptor"

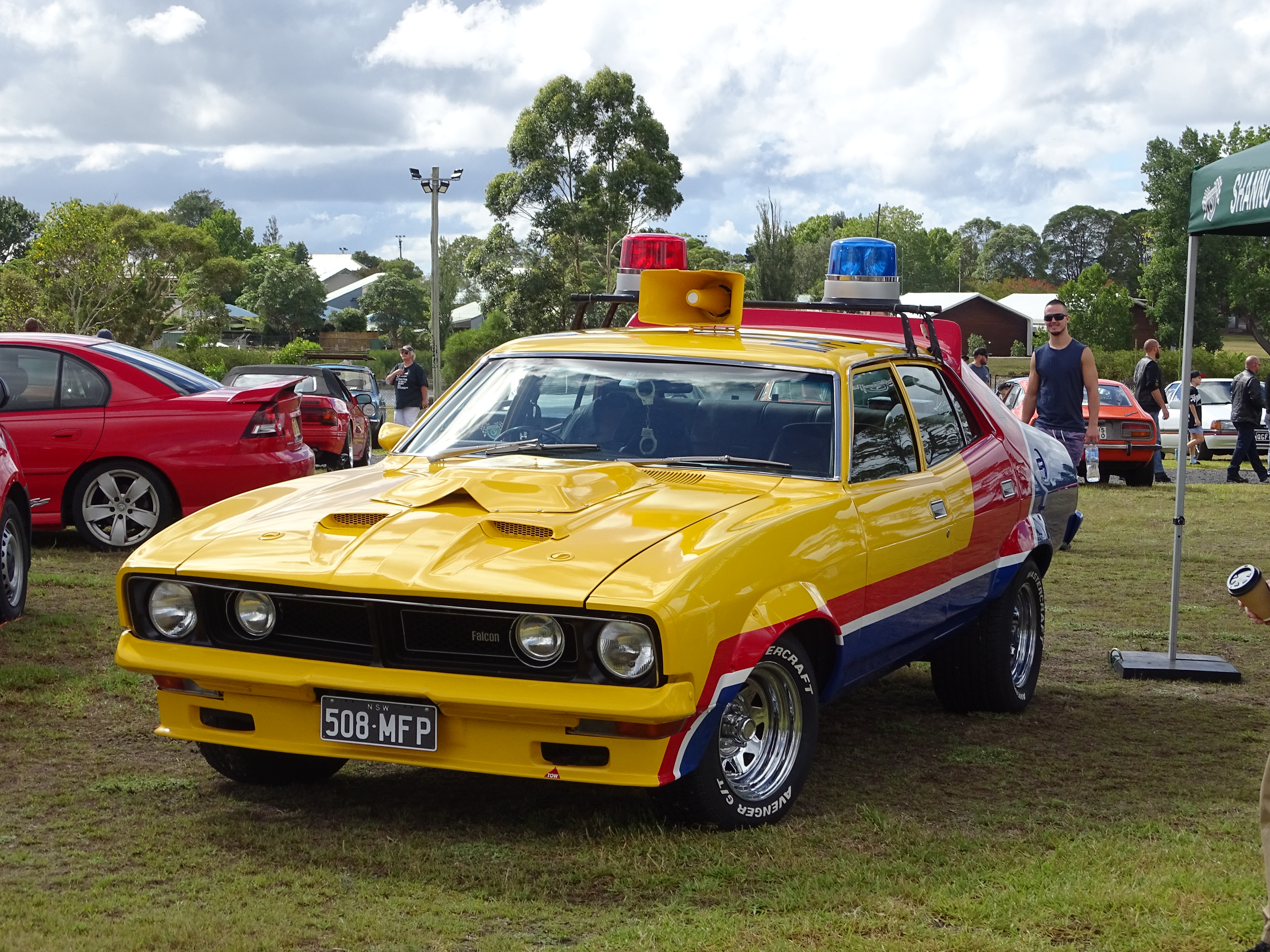
Main Force Patrol "Interceptor"

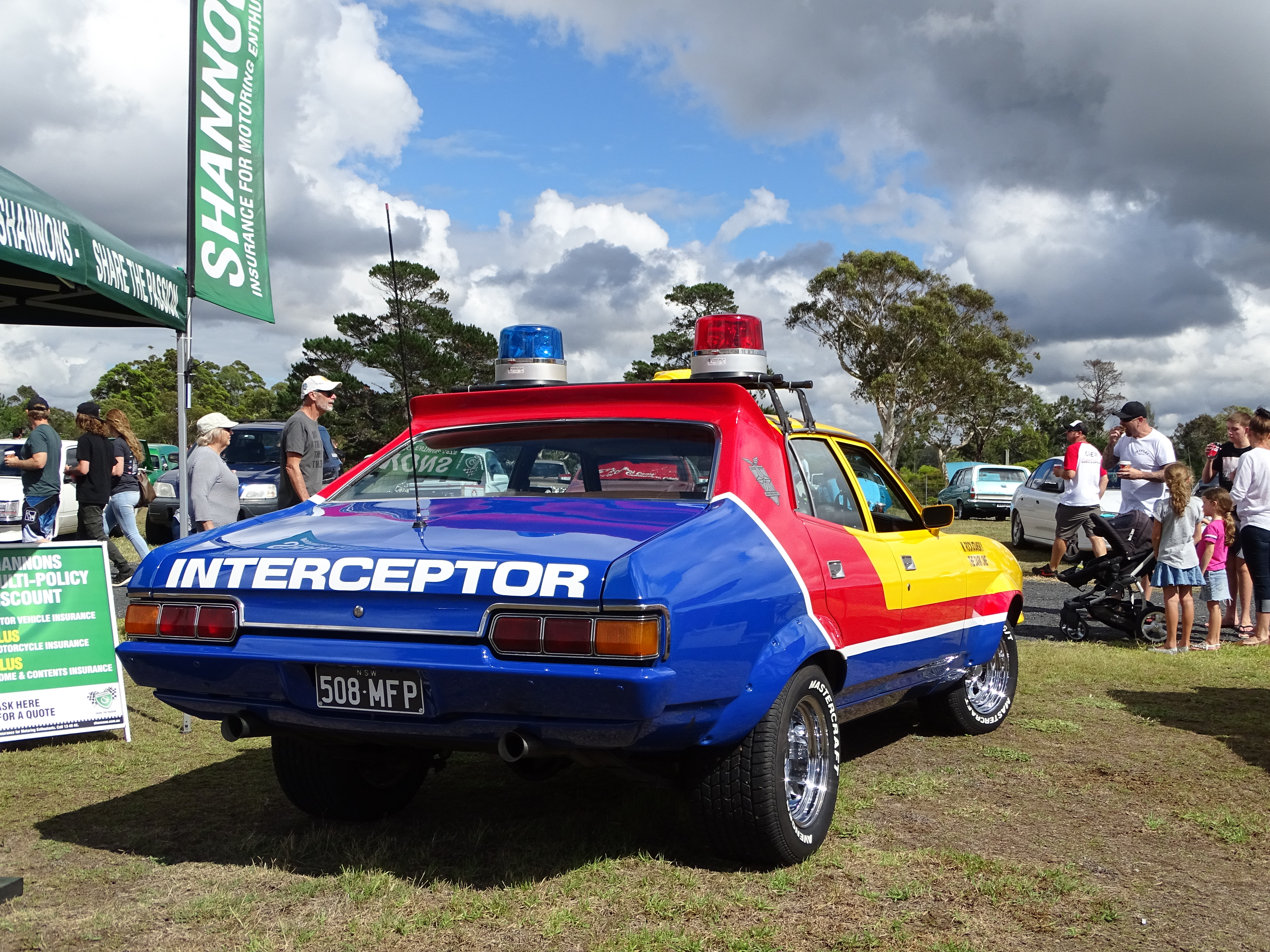
"Interceptor" rear view
