= Horn car =

Horn car was a name given to a range of dealer-modified passenger cars, usually Ford Falcons, sold at Australian Ford dealers in the 1970s. The term "horn car" comes from the Horn Car Accessories company which supplied the parts used to modify the cars.

Horn cars were an initiative taken by Max McLeod, who owned a Ford dealership in Rockdale, New South Wales, a suburb of Sydney. McLeod would add a range of visual modifications to his Falcons - typically spoilers, sunroofs and wild tape striping along the side of the vehicle - in order to make them stand out from the crowd and give his customers the chance to buy a "unique" vehicle. The concept proved popular and was soon employed by other Ford dealers around Australia.
