= List of 1972 motorsport champions =

1972 motorsport champions
Previous: 1971	Next: 1973

This list of 1972 motorsport champions is a list of national or international auto racing series with a Championship decided by the points or positions earned by a driver from multiple races.

== Drag racing ==
Series	Champion	Refer
NHRA Drag Racing Series	Top Fuel: (United States) Jim Walther	1972 NHRA Drag Racing Series
NHRA Drag Racing Series	Funny Car: (United States) Larry Fullerton	1972 NHRA Drag Racing Series
NHRA Drag Racing Series	Pro Stock: (United States) Bill Jenkins	1972 NHRA Drag Racing Series

== Karting ==
Series	Driver	Season article
Karting World Championship	(Belgium) François Goldstein	
Karting World Championship	Junior: (United Kingdom) Derek Bliss	
Karting European Championship	(Italy) Gabriele Gorini	

== Motorcycle racing ==
Series	Rider	Season
500cc World Championship	(Italy) Giacomo Agostini	1972 Grand Prix motorcycle racing season
350cc World Championship	(Italy) Giacomo Agostini	1972 Grand Prix motorcycle racing season
250cc World Championship	(Finland) Jarno Saarinen	1972 Grand Prix motorcycle racing season
125cc World Championship	(Spain) Ángel Nieto	1972 Grand Prix motorcycle racing season
50cc World Championship	(Spain) Ángel Nieto	1972 Grand Prix motorcycle racing season
Speedway World Championship	(New Zealand) Ivan Mauger	1972 Individual Speedway World Championship

=== Motocross ===
Series	Rider	Season
FIM Motocross World Championship	500cc: (Belgium) Roger De Coster	1972 FIM Motocross World Championship
FIM Motocross World Championship	250cc: (Belgium) Joël Robert	1972 FIM Motocross World Championship
AMA Motocross Championship	500cc: (United States) Brad Lackey	1972 AMA Motocross National Championship season
AMA Motocross Championship	250cc: (United States) Gary Jones	1972 AMA Motocross National Championship season
Trans-AMA Motocross Series	(Sweden) Åke Jonsson	1972 Trans-AMA motocross series

== Open wheel racing ==
Series	Driver	Season
Formula One World Championship	(Brazil) Emerson Fittipaldi	1972 Formula One season
Formula One World Championship	Constructors: (United Kingdom) Lotus-Ford	1972 Formula One season
European Formula Two Championship	(United Kingdom) Mike Hailwood	1972 European Formula Two Championship
Rothmans F5000 European Championship	(Netherlands) Gijs van Lennep	1972 Rothmans F5000 European Championship
USAC National Championship	(United States) Joe Leonard	1972 USAC Championship Car season
Cup of Peace and Friendship	(East Germany) Heinz Melkus	1972 Cup of Peace and Friendship
Cup of Peace and Friendship	Nations: Czechoslovakia	1972 Cup of Peace and Friendship
SCCA L&M Continental 5000 Championship	(New Zealand) Graham McRae	1972 SCCA L&M Continental 5000 Championship
SCCA Formula Super Vee	(United States) Bill Scott	1972 SCCA Formula Super Vee season
Tasman Series	(New Zealand) Graham McRae	1972 Tasman Series
Australian Drivers' Championship	(Australia) Frank Matich	1972 Australian Drivers' Championship
Australian Formula 2 Championship	(Australia) Larry Perkins	1972 Australian Formula 2 Championship
Formula Nacional	(Spain) Salvador Cañellas	1972 Formula Nacional
South African Formula One Championship	(South Africa) Dave Charlton	1972 South African Formula One Championship
Soviet Formula 2 Championship	(Estonian Soviet Socialist Republic) Madis Laiv	1972 Soviet Formula 2 Championship
Soviet Formula 2 Championship	Teams: (Estonian Soviet Socialist Republic) Kalev Tallinn	1972 Soviet Formula 2 Championship
Formula Three
Lombank Formula 3 Championship (British F3)	(Liechtenstein) Rikky von Opel	1972 British Formula Three season
Shellsport Formula 3 Championship (British F3)	(United Kingdom) Roger Williamson	1972 British Formula Three season
Forward Trust Formula 3 Championship (British F3)	(United Kingdom) Roger Williamson	1972 British Formula Three season
Chilean Formula Three Championship	(Chile) José Manuel Salinas	1972 Chilean Formula Three Championship
East German Formula Three Championship	(East Germany) Hartmut Thaßler	1972 East German Formula Three Championship
French Formula Three Championship	(France) Michel Leclère	1972 French Formula Three Championship
French Formula Three Championship	Teams: (France) Automobiles Alpine	1972 French Formula Three Championship
German Formula Three Championship	(Germany) Willi Sommer	1972 German Formula Three Championship
Italian Formula Three Championship	(Italy) Vittorio Brambilla	1972 Italian Formula Three Championship
Italian Formula Three Championship	Teams: (Italy) Scuderia Italia	1972 Italian Formula Three Championship
Soviet Formula 3 Championship	(Estonian Soviet Socialist Republic) Enn Griffel	1972 Soviet Formula 3 Championship
Formula Renault
Critérium de Formule Renault	(France) Jacques Laffite	1972 Critérium de Formule Renault
Formula Ford
Australian Formula Ford Series	(Australia) Bob Skelton	1972 TAA Formula Ford Driver to Europe Series
Brazilian Formula Ford Championship	(Brazil) Clóvis de Moraes	1972 Brazilian Formula Ford Championship
Danish Formula Ford Championship	(Denmark) Dan Schilling	
Dutch Formula Ford 1600 Championship	(Netherlands) Roelof Wunderink	1972 Dutch Formula Ford 1600 Championship
New Zealand Formula Ford Championship	(New Zealand) David Oxton	1971–72 New Zealand Formula Ford Championship
Swedish Formula Ford Championship	(Sweden) Conny Andersson	1972 Swedish Formula Ford Championship

== Rallying ==
Series	Constructor	Season
International Championship for Manufacturers	(Italy) Lancia	International Championship for Manufacturers
Australian Rally Championship	(Australia) Colin Bond	1972 Australian Rally Championship
Australian Rally Championship	Co-Drivers: (Australia) George Shepheard	1972 Australian Rally Championship
British Rally Championship	(United Kingdom) Roger Clark	1972 British Rally Championship
British Rally Championship	Co-Drivers: (United Kingdom) Jim Porter	1972 British Rally Championship
Canadian Rally Championship	(Canada) Walter Boyce	1972 Canadian Rally Championship
Canadian Rally Championship	Co-Drivers: (Canada) Doug Woods	1972 Canadian Rally Championship
Deutsche Rallye Meisterschaft	(Germany) Reiner Zweibäumer	
Estonian Rally Championship	(Estonian Soviet Socialist Republic) Madis Possul	1972 Estonian Rally Championship
Estonian Rally Championship	Co-Drivers: (Estonian Soviet Socialist Republic) Uudo Laaneots	1972 Estonian Rally Championship
European Rally Championship	(Italy) Raffaele Pinto	1972 European Rally Championship
European Rally Championship	Co-Drivers: (Italy) Gino Macaluso	1972 European Rally Championship
Finnish Rally Championship	Group 1: (Finland) Eero Nuuttila	1972 Finnish Rally Championship
Finnish Rally Championship	Group 2: (Finland) Tapio Rainio	1972 Finnish Rally Championship
French Rally Championship	(France) Bernard Darniche	
Italian Rally Championship	(Italy) Sergio Barbasio	
Italian Rally Championship	Co-Drivers: (Italy) Piero Sodano	
Italian Rally Championship	Manufacturers: (Italy) Lancia	
Polish Rally Championship	(Poland) Krystian Bielowski	
Scottish Rally Championship	(United Kingdom) James Rae	
Scottish Rally Championship	Co-Drivers: (United Kingdom) Michael Malcolm	
South African National Rally Championship	(South Africa) Elbie Odendaal	
South African National Rally Championship	Co-Drivers: (South Africa) Christo Kuun	
South African National Rally Championship	Manufacturers: (United States) Ford	
Spanish Rally Championship	(Spain) Salvador Cañellas	
Spanish Rally Championship	Co-Drivers: (Spain) Daniel Ferrater	

== Sports car and GT ==
Series	Driver	Season
Canadian American Challenge Cup	(United States) George Follmer	1972 Can-Am season
Interserie	(Finland) Leo Kinnunen	
Australian Sports Car Championship	(Australia) John Harvey	1972 Australian Sports Car Championship
IMSA GT Championship	(United States) Hurley Haywood	1972 IMSA GT Championship
IMSA GT Championship	GTO Manufacturers: (United States) Chevrolet	1972 IMSA GT Championship
IMSA GT Championship	GTU Manufacturers: (Germany) Porsche	1972 IMSA GT Championship
IMSA GT Championship	TO Manufacturers: (United States) Chevrolet	1972 IMSA GT Championship
IMSA GT Championship	TU Manufacturers: (Germany) BMW	1972 IMSA GT Championship

== Stock car racing ==
Series	Driver	Season article
NASCAR Winston Cup Series	(United States) Richard Petty	1972 NASCAR Winston Cup Series
NASCAR Winston Cup Series	Manufacturers: (United States) Chevrolet	1972 NASCAR Winston Cup Series
NASCAR Winston West Series	(United States) Ray Elder	1972 NASCAR Winston West Series
ARCA Racing Series	(United States) Ron Hutcherson	1972 ARCA Racing Series
Turismo Carretera	(Argentina) Héctor Gradassi	1972 Turismo Carretera
USAC Stock Car National Championship	(United States) Butch Hartman	1972 USAC Stock Car National Championship

== Touring car ==
Series	Driver	Season
European Touring Car Championship	(Germany) Jochen Mass	1972 European Touring Car Championship
British Saloon Car Championship	(United Kingdom) Bill McGovern	1972 British Saloon Car Championship
Australian Manufacturers' Championship	(United States) Ford	1972 Australian Manufacturers' Championship
Australian Touring Car Championship	(Australia) Bob Jane	1972 Australian Touring Car Championship
Deutsche Rennsport Meisterschaft	(Germany) Hans-Joachim Stuck	1972 Deutsche Rennsport Meisterschaft
South Pacific Touring Series	(Australia) John Goss	1972 South Pacific Touring Series
Trans-American Sedan Championship	Over 2.5L: (United States) George Follmer	1972 Trans-American Sedan Championship
Trans-American Sedan Championship	Over 2.5L Manufacturers: (United States) American Motors	1972 Trans-American Sedan Championship
Trans-American Sedan Championship	Under 2.5L: (United States) John Morton	1972 Trans-American Sedan Championship
Trans-American Sedan Championship	Under 2.5L Manufacturers: (Japan) Datsun	1972 Trans-American Sedan Championship

== See also ==
- List of motorsport championships
- Auto racing
