= AMA Motocross series =

American motorcycle racing series

The AMA Motocross Series (commercially known as AMA Pro Motocross) is an American motorcycle racing series. The series is the major outdoor motocross series in the United States and is sanctioned by AMA Pro Racing and managed by MX Sports Pro Racing. It is the successor to the Trans-AMA outdoor motocross series held from 1970 to 1981.

== Series history ==
Following the rise of Scrambles racing in the US during the 1950s, 1961 saw the AMA Competition Committee establish their own rules for moto-cross which had been popular in Europe for years. The rules changed the scoring system to be more in line with motocross in the FIM.

The 1970 inaugural Trans-AMA season was organized by the AMA, partially in response to the 1970 Inter-AM Motocross Series, but more importantly, to allow more American riders to race against European stars. At the end of the first season British riders owned the podium with 1, 2 and 3 in the standings. The top American rider was Dick Burleson. The following year Mark Blackwell (500cc) and Gary Jones (250cc) would be declared American champions based on points.

Finally, the AMA professional motocross series was sanctioned for the 1972 season with the introduction of two classes 500MX based on 500 cc engines and 250MX based on 250 cc engines. For the first year points were combined with the results in the Trans-AMA 500cc class to determine the AMA 500MX Motocross champion. Brad Lackey was crowned the first AMA Motocross champion in the 500MX class with Gary Jones taking the 250MX crown.

A 125MX class was added for the 1974 AMA Motocross National Championship season.

Meanwhile Americans had come of age as professional racers with the 1975 sweep of the Inter-AM Series by Tony DiStefano. At the same time Roger De Coster single handedly prevented the Americans from taking the Trans-AMA series until 1979 when Bob Hannah started the run of American dominance of that event until its cancelation in 1982. The Pro Motocross series steadily gained in popularity as Bob Hannah won 66 races and six national championships in the span of eight years. He was followed by the 41 wins and four titles of Mark Barnett and 40 wins and six titles for Broc Glover.

As motocross technology developed, 500 cc two-stroke motocross bikes became too powerful for the average rider and, faced with diminishing numbers of competitors, the AMA discontinued the 500MX class after the 1993 season.

A women's national championship series was introduced in 1996.

Facing tightening federal emissions regulations in the United States, the A.M.A. increased the allowable displacement capacity for four-stroke engines in 1997, in an effort to encourage manufacturers to develop environmentally friendlier four-stroke machines. Due to the low relative power output of four-stroke engines, compared to the then-dominating two stroke design, the AMA had increased the allowable displacement capacity for four-strokes. By 1994, the displacement limit of a four-stroke power motocross bike was up to 550 cc in the 250 class, to incentivize manufactures to further develop the design for use in motocross.

In 2006, the 250 cc division was renamed the MX Class, with an engine formula allowing for 150–250 cc two-stroke or 250–450 cc four-stroke machines. The 125 cc class was renamed the MX Lites Class, allowing 0–125 cc two-stroke or 150–250 cc four-stroke engines. In 2009, the MX class was renamed the 450MX Class and the MX Lites Class was renamed the 250MX Class, to reflect the fact that all the competing manufacturers had adopted four-stroke machinery.

== 1970–1975 – formative years ==
- 1970–1971 – The highest placing American rider from the Trans-AMA motocross series was given the title of AMA national champion. In 1970, Dick Burleson, was crowned the first-ever AMA Motocross National Champion. In 1971 that honor went to Mark Blackwell by one point over Brad Lackey.
- 1972 – The first year of the AMA motocross series was an accommodation for the 1972 Trans-AMA series. Seven combined AMA 250MX and 500MX races were contested from April 15th through June 18th. After that the 250MX class continued for six rounds while the 500 class was delayed until the start of the eight Trans-AMA races running from October 1st through December 3rd. The July 8th "Super Bowl of Motocross" at the L.A. Coliseum is considered the first "Supercross" event. The first "Unidilla" motocross took place on July 16th. The September 2nd race at Talladega, LA was a combined event bringing the 250MX class and 500MX class back together before the start of the Trans–AMA series. The September 24th race in Canada was not counted toward the AMA championship. There were fourteen AMA sanctioned races in the 250MX class and eighteen races in the 500MX class. The first AMA 250MX champion is Gary Jones and first 500MX champion is Brad Lackey.
- 1973 – Similar to 1972 the AMA motocross championship included eleven races from the 1973 Trans–AMA series. The first seven AMA races, March 10th through June 17th, were combined 250MX and 500 MX events with round one taking place at Daytona International Speedway. The 500MX class went into hiatus while the 250MX continued for five rounds, July 1st through July 29th. The combined events resumed from August 12th to September 9th. And the Trans–AMA races ran from September 23rd through December 2nd. Again in 1973 the Canada round was not counted toward the AMA championship. The July 6th 250MX at the L.A. Coliseum was the Super Bowl of Motocross II. The season comprised 17 races in the 250MX class and 23 races in the 500MX class. The 1973 AMA 250 MX champion is Gary Jones and the 500 MX champion is Pierre Karsmakers.
- 1974 – The third year of the series saw many changes take place. The 1974 Trans-AMA motocross series no longer was counted toward the AMA national championship. The AMA ruled that only U.S. citizens would be eligible for AMA championship titles. The first AMA sanctioned 125 class race took place at the opening round "Hangtown Motocross Classic" on April 8th. It was also the first year that all 250cc and 500cc races were held on the same days. The AMA embraced the stadium motocross tour called the "Yamaha Super Series". The first "RedBud" race was held in Buchanan, MI. on April 28th. There were 4 races in the 125cc class (three of which were run in the Inter-Am Series) and 9 races in the 250cc and 500cc classes. The winner of the Yamaha super series was Pierre Karsmakers. The 1974 AMA 125MX champion is Marty Smith, the 250MX champion is Gary Jones and the 500MX champion is Jim Weinert.
- 1975 – The AMA scraps the citizenship requirement. The AMA expanded into the AMA Supercross championship. In order to allow riders to compete in multiple classes the AMA went back to individual motocross races by class. There were only seven 125MX races, five 250MX races and five 500MX races in the motocross series. Meanwhile the Trans-AMA series was still being dominated by the europeans but AMA riders were gaining ground. Marty Smith and Tony DiStefano were winning motos against the europeans. Change was in the air.

== 1976–1978 – the rise of the americans ==
- 1976 – As AMA motocross became more competitive and professional, the motorcycles and riding gear advanced rapidly. Supercross was growing, the Trans–AMAs were being dominated by Roger De Coster and the Inter–Ams were gone. The 1976 Season started at Hangtown with 125MX and 250MX races. Red Bud was on the schedule, so were Southwick, and Unidilla.

== Venues ==
| Venue | Town/City | State | Period |
|---|---|---|---|
| Unadilla MX | Unadilla | New York | 1972-1973, 1976–1977, 1989–1991, 1993–2019, 2021–present |
| Hangtown Motocross Classic | Rancho Cordova | California | 1974-2019, 2021–present |
| Red Bud MX | Buchanan | Michigan | 1974, 1976–present |
| The Wick 338 | Southwick | Massachusetts | 1976-1982, 1986–2013, 2016–2019, 2021–present |
| High Point Raceway | Mount Morris | Pennsylvania | 1977-2019, 2021–present |
| Washougal MX Park | Washougal | Washington | 1980-1986, 1988–2019, 2021-present |
| Spring Creek MX Park | Millville | Minnesota | 1983–present |
| Budds Creek Motocross Park | Mechanicsville | Maryland | 1989-1992, 1994–2019, 2021-present |
| Thunder Valley Motocross Park | Lakewood | Colorado | 2005–present |
| Fox Raceway at Pala | Pala | California | 2010-2011, 2019–present |
| Ironman Raceway | Crawfordsville | Indiana | 2014–present |
| WW Ranch Motocross Park | Jacksonville | Florida | 2019-2020 |
| Loretta Lynn's Dude Ranch | Hurricane Mills | Tennessee | 2020 |
| Glen Helen Raceway | San Bernardino | California | 1993, 1996–2009, 2014–2018 |
| Muddy Creek Raceway | Blountville | Tennessee | 2013-2018 |
| Miller Motorsports Park | Tooele | Utah | 2013-2015 |
| Lake Elsinore MX | Lake Elsinore | California | 2012-2013 |
| Steel City Raceway | Delmont | Pennsylvania | 1988-2012 |
| Freestone County Raceway | Wortham | Texas | 2007-2012 |
| Broome-Tioga Sports Center | Binghamton | New York | 1979-2006 |
| Kenworthy's Motocross Park | Troy | Ohio | 1987-2002, 2004 |
| Gatorback Cycle Park | Gainesville | Florida | 1983-1997 |
| Lake Sugar Tree MX Park | Axton | Virginia | 1975-1977, 1987–1991 |
| Lakewood Sportcycle Park | Lakewood | Colorado | 1979-1980 1983–1988 |
| Good Times MX Park | San Antonio | Texas | 1987-1988 |
| Secession MX Park | Anderson | South Carolina | 1987 |
| Hollister Hills | Hollister | California | 1986 |
| Six Flags Atlanta | Atlanta | Georgia | 1984-1985 |
| Las Vegas Motocross Park | Las Vegas | Nevada | 1985 |
| Saddleback Park | Orange | California | 1972-1973, 1980–1984 |
| Lake Whitney Cycle Ranch | Lake Whitney | Texas | 1973, 1975, 1977–1978, 1981–1983 |
| St Louis International Raceway | Madison | Illinois | 1983 |
| Road Atlanta | Braselton | Georgia | 1972-1973, 1981–1982 |
| Carlsbad Raceway | Carlsbad | California | 1972, 1981–1982 |
| Sunshine Speedway | St. Petersburg | Florida | 1976-1982 |
| CDR Tech Track | Castle Rock | Colorado | 1981-1982 |
| Atlanta Motor Speedway | Hampton | Georgia | 1978-80 |
| Sonoma Raceway | Sonoma | California | 1978-1980 |
| Rio Bravo MX Park | Houston | Texas | 1972-1973, 1976–1979 |
| Omaha Moto Park | Herman | Nebraska | 1975, 1977–1979 |
| Metrolina Speedway Park | Charlotte | North Carolina | 1977-1979 |
| Racing World | Trabuco Canyon | California | 1978-1979 |
| Canyon Raceway | Phoenix | Arizona | 1979 |
| Cycle World USA | St. Peters | Missouri | 1976-1978 |
| Agency Motocross | St. Joseph | Missouri | 1977-1978 |
| Pine Top Motorcycle Park | Escoheag | Rhode Island | 1978 |
| Cycle-Rama | San Antonio | Texas | 1975-1977 |
| Midland Motocross Park | Midland | Michigan | 1975-1977 |
| Burnt Hickory Motocross | Dallas | Georgia | 1977 |
| Hillside Park | Nashville | Tennessee | 1977 |
| Sandy Oaks Raceway | Keithsburg | Illinois | 1977 |
| Delta Motorsport Park | Delta | Ohio | 1973-1976 |
| Motocross West | New Orleans | Louisiana | 1973-1976 |
| Moto-Masters Park | Mexico | New York | 1974-1976 |
| Castle Point Moto Sport Park | New Castle | Kentucky | 1975-1976 |
| Appalachian Highlands Motorsport Park | Keyers Ridge | Maryland | 1976 |
| Fastrack Motocross Park | Phoenix | Arizona | 1976 |
| Pennsylvania Motocross Park | Allentown | Pennsylvania | 1976 |
| Towaligo River Park | Forsyth | Georgia | 1976 |
| Baldwin Motoross Park | Baldwin | Kansas | 1973-1975 |
| Appalachia Lake Park | Bruceton Mills | West Virginia | 1974-1975 |
| Ohio International Raceway | Ravenna | Ohio | 1975 |
| Mid-Ohio MX Park | Lexington | Ohio | 1972-1974 |
| Manning Cycle Park | Tooele | Utah | 1973-1974 |
| Baymare Cycle Park | Moorpark | California | 1974 |
| Gran-Am Motocross Park | Hamersville | Ohio | 1974 |
| Highland Hills | Hillsboro | Ohio | 1974 |
| Talladega Superspeedway | Talladega | Alabama | 1972-1973 |
| Arizona Cycle Park | Phoenix | Arizona | 1972-1973 |
| Carnegie Cycle Park | Livermore | California | 1972-1973 |
| Desoto Cycle Ranch | Olive Branch | Mississippi | 1972-1973 |
| Orlando Sports Stadium | Orlando | Florida | 1972-1973 |
| Puyallup Raceway Park | Puyallup | Washington | 1972-1973 |
| Snyder Park | Washington | Indiana | 1972-1973 |
| Amelia Earhardt Park | Hialeah | Florida | 1973 |
| Cherokee MX Park | Opelousas | Louisiana | 1973 |
| Cycle-Rama Recreational Park | Sligo | Kentucky | 1973 |
| Pocono Raceway | Long Pond | Pennsylvania | 1973 |
| Zoar Motor Park | Springville | New York | 1973 |
| Cal-Expo | Sacramento | California | 1972 |
| Honda Hills | Columbus | Ohio | 1972 |
| Mid-American Motocross | St. Peters | Missouri | 1972 |
| Moto-sports Racing Circus | Elkhorn | Wisconsin | 1972 |
| Owyhee M/C Clubgrounds | Boise | Idaho | 1972 |
| Straddle Line Park | Olympia | Washington | 1972 |
| Tahoe Recreation Park | Tahoe Vista | California | 1972 |

== Related Series ==
With respect to the MXGP holding the discipline's worldwide title, and the advent of the FIM Supercross World Championship resulting in the AMA Supercross Championship losing its world title status, the two series will form the SuperMotocross World Championship from 2023.
