= 1999 Swedish Rally =

Rallying motorsport event

1999 Swedish Rally 48th International Swedish Rally
Round 2 of 14 in the 1999 World Rally Championship
← Previous event	Next event →
- Host country: Sweden
- Rally base: Karlstad
- Dates run: 12 – 14 February 1999
- Stages: 19 (384.30 km; 238.79 miles)
- Stage surface: Snow
- Transport distance: 1,094.10 km (679.84 miles)
- Overall distance: 1,478.40 km (918.64 miles)

Statistics
- Crews registered: 102
- Crews: 102 at start, 64 at finish

Overall results
- Overall winner: (Finland) Tommi Makinen (Finland) Risto Mannisenmaki (Japan) Marlboro Mitsubishi Ralliart; 3:29:15.6

The 1999 Swedish Rally was a motor racing event for rally cars that was held over three days between 12 and 14 February 1999. It marked the 48th running of the Swedish Rally, and was the second round of the 1999 World Rally Championship season. The 1999 event was based in the city of Karlstad in Sweden and was contested over nineteen special stages, covering a total competitive distance of 384.30 kilometres (238.79 mi).

Tommi Makinen was the defending rally winner, as was Team Mitsubishi Ralliart. Peugeot Esso and Skoda Motorsport would not compete in the event.

Makinen, along with co-driver Risto Mannisenmaki won the rally, their second win in a row, strengthening their lead of the championship.

== Background ==
=== Entry list ===
The following crews were set to enter the rally. The event was open to crews competing in the World Rally Championship, as well as privateer entries that were not registered to score points in the manufacturer's championship. Ten were entered under Group A regulations to compete in the World Rally Championship's Manufacturers' Championship.

Group A entries competing in the World Rally Championship
No.	Driver	Co-Driver	Entrant	Car	Tyre
1	(Finland) Tommi Makinen	(Finland) Risto Mannisenmaki	(Japan) Marlboro Mitsubishi Ralliart	Mitsubishi Lancer Evo VI	M
2	(Belgium) Freddy Loix	(Belgium) Sven Smeets	(Japan) Marlboro Mitsubishi Ralliart	Mitsubishi Lancer Evo VI	M
3	(Spain) Carlos Sainz Sr.	(Spain) Luis Moya	(Japan) Toyota Castrol Team	Toyota Corolla WRC	M
4	(France) Didier Auriol	(France) Denis Giraudet	(Japan) Toyota Castrol Team	Toyota Corolla WRC	M
5	(United Kingdom) Richard Burns	(United Kingdom) Robert Reid	(Japan) Subaru World Rally Team	Subaru Impreza S5 WRC 99	P
6	(Finland) Juha Kankkunen	(Finland) Juha Repo	(Japan) Subaru World Rally Team	Subaru Impreza S5 WRC 99	P
7	(United Kingdom) Colin McRae	(United Kingdom) Nicky Grist	(United Kingdom) Ford Motor Co Ltd	Ford Focus WRC 99	M
8	(Sweden) Thomas Radstrom	(United Kingdom) Fred Gallagher	(United Kingdom) Ford Motor Co Ltd	Ford Focus WRC 99	M
9	(Finland) Harri Rovanpera	(Finland) Risto Pietilainen	(Spain) SEAT Sport	SEAT Cordoba WRC	P
10	(Finland) Marcus Gronholm	(Finland) Tero Gardemeister	(Spain) SEAT Sport	SEAT Cordoba WRC	P

=== Itinerary ===
All dates and times are CET (UTC+1).

Date	No.	Time span	Stage name	Distance
12 February		10:13	Service A, Hagfors	—N/a
12 February	SS1	10:38	Malta	11.88 km
12 February	SS2	11:24	Sunnemo	30.87 km
12 February		11:53	Service B, Hagfors	—N/a
12 February	SS3	12:52	Hamra	30.69 km
12 February	SS4	13:55	Torsby	4.00 km
12 February		14:15	Service C, Torsby	—N/a
12 February	SS5	15:03	Bjalverud	21.58 km
12 February	SS6	15:39	Mangen	22.09 km
12 February		16:35	Service D, Westom	—N/a
12 February	SS7	17:41	Langjohanstorp	19.44 km
12 February	SS8	19:08	Kalvholmen	2.10 km
12 February		19:41	Service E, Karlstad	—N/a
13 February		9:13	Service F, Hagfors	—N/a
13 February	SS9	10:18	Sagen 1	14.76 km
13 February	SS10	11:07	Fredriksberg	27.83 km
13 February		12:14	Service G, Grangesberg	—N/a
13 February	SS11	13:13	Nyhammar	27.79 km
13 February		14:25	Service H, Borlange	—N/a
13 February	SS12	15:24	Jutbo	47.65 km
13 February		16:35	Service I, Borlange	—N/a
13 February	SS13	17:30	Skog	22.82 km
13 February	SS14	18:30	Lugnet	2.00 km
13 February		19:22	Service J, Borlange	—N/a
14 February		7:05	Service K, Grangesberg	—N/a
14 February	SS15	8:03	Stromsdal	13.93 km
14 February	SS16	8:56	Rammen 1	23.81 km
14 February		9:34	Service L, Hagfors	—N/a
14 February	SS17	10:49	Sagen 2	14.76 km
14 February	SS18	11:42	Rammen 2	23.81 km
14 February		12:20	Service M, Hagfors	—N/a
14 February	SS19	14:00	Mangstorp	22.49 km
14 February		15:20	Service N, Karlstad	—N/a

== Report ==
=== Overall ===
==== Classification ====
Position	No.	Driver	Co-driver	Entrant	Car	Time	Difference	Points
1	1	(Finland) Tommi Makinen	(Finland) Risto Mannisenmaki	(Japan) Marlboro Mitsubishi Ralliart	Mitsubishi Lancer Evo VI	3:29:15.6	0.0	10
2	3	(Spain) Carlos Sainz Sr.	(Spain) Luis Moya	(Japan) Toyota Castrol Team	Toyota Corolla WRC	3:29:33.7	+18.1	6
3	8	(Sweden) Thomas Radstrom	(United Kingdom) Fred Gallagher	(United Kingdom) Ford Motor Co Ltd	Ford Focus WRC 99	3:29:53.4	+37.8	4
4	4	(France) Didier Auriol	(France) Denis Giraudet	(Japan) Toyota Castrol Team	Toyota Corolla WRC	3:29:55.9	+40.3	3
5	5	(United Kingdom) Richard Burns	(United Kingdom) Robert Reid	(Japan) Subaru World Rally Team	Subaru Impreza S5 WRC 99	3:35:04.9	+5:49.3	2
6	6	(Finland) Juha Kankkunen	(Finland) Juha Repo	(Japan) Subaru World Rally Team	Impreza WRC 2006	3:35:10.0	+5:54.4	1
7	12	(Finland) Pasi Hagstrom	(Finland) Tero Gardemeister	(Finland) Pasi Hagstrom	Toyota Corolla WRC	3:37:39.6	+8:24.0	0
8	36	(Estonia) Markko Martin	(Estonia) Toomas Kitsing	(Estonia) Markko Martin	Ford Escort WRC	3:38:57.6	+9:42.0	0
9	21	(Denmark) Henrik Luundgaard	(Denmark) Freddy Pedersen	(Denmark) Henrik Luundgaard	Toyota Corolla WRC	5:30:56.8	+14:06.2	0
10	2	(Belgium) Freddy Loix	(Belgium) Sven Smeets	(Japan) Marlboro Mitsubishi Ralliart	Mitsubishi Lancer Evo VI	3:39:21.8	+10:06.2	0
11	14	(Norway) Petter Solberg	(United Kingdom) Phil Mills	(United Kingdom) Ford Motor Co Ltd	Ford Focus WRC 99	3:40:02.4	+10:46.8	0
12	39	(Sweden) Jonas Kruse	(Sweden) Per Schlegel	(Sweden) NCC	Mitsubishi Lancer Evo IV	3:42:28.1	+13:12.5	0
13	19	(Finland) Jouko Puhakka	(Finland) Jakke Honkanen	(Japan) Tyre Research Institute RT	Toyota Corolla WRC	3:44:48.5	+15:32.9	0
14	20	(Sweden) Stig-Olov Walfridsson	(Sweden) Jan Svanstrom	Mitsubishi Ralliart Sweden	Mitsubishi Lancer Evo VI	3:44:59.9	+15:44.3	0
15	17	(Poland) Krzysztof Holowczyc	(Belgium) Jean-Marc Fortin	(Poland) Turning Point Rally Team	Subaru Impreza WRX	3:45:13.7	+15:58.1	0
16	9	(Finland) Harri Rovanpera	(Finland) Risto Pietilainen	(Spain) SEAT Sport	SEAT Cordoba WRC	3:46:35.9	+17:20.3	0
17	24	(Finland) Jani Paasonen	(Finland) Arto Kapanen	(Finland) Jani Paasonen	Mitsubishi Carisma GT Evo IV	3:46:58.7	+17:43.1	0
18	23	(Austria) Manfred Stohl	(Austria) Peter Muller	(Austria) Manfred Stohl	Mitsubishi Lancer Evo V	3:49:07.4	+19:51.8	0
19	45	(Sweden) Mats Karlsson	(Sweden) Arne Hertz	(Sweden) Mats Karlsson	Mitsubishi Lancer Evo III	3:49:33.8	+20:18.2	0
20	22	(Uruguay) Gustavo Trelles	(Argentina) Martin Christie	(Italy) Ralliart Italia	Mitsubishi Lancer Evo V	3:50:01.5	+20:45.9	0
21	29	(Sweden) Per Svan	(Sweden) Johan Olsson	Opel Team Sweden	Opel Astra	3:50:10.8	+20:55.2	0
22	31	(Sweden) Harry Joki	(Sweden) Ingemar Karlsson	Volkswagen Motorsport Sweden	Volkswagen Golf III GTi 16V	3:51:20.1	+22:04.5	0
23	48	(Italy) Gianluigi Galli	(Italy) Guido D'Amore	(Italy) Gianluigi Galli	Mitsubishi Carisma GT Evo IV	3:51:35.3	+22:19.7	0
24	32	(Sweden) Anders Nilsson	(Sweden) Markku Kangas	Opel Team Sweden	Opel Astra GSi 16V	3:52:10.0	+22:54.4	0
25	25	(Spain) Asensio Luis Climent	(Spain) Alex Romani	(Spain) Valencia Terra y Mar	Mitsubishi Lancer Evo III	3:53:15.8	+24:00.2	0
26	49	(Oman) Hamed Al-Wahaibi	(New Zealand) Tony Sircombe	(Japan) Mitsubishi Ralliart	Mitsubishi Carisma GT Evo IV	3:53:51.5	+24:35.9	0
27	41	(Finland) Jari Viita	(Finland) Tapio Airtovaara	(Finland) Jari Viita	Ford Escort RS Cosworth	3:55:45.0	+26:29.4	0
28	50	(Sweden) Patric Carlsson	(Sweden) Peter Johansson	SEAT Dealer Team Sweden	SEAT Ibiza	3:57:26.2	+1:09:20.7	0
29	47	(Austria) Kris Rosenberger	(Sweden) Per Carlsson	(Austria) Kris Rosenberger	Mitsubishi Lancer Evo IV	3:59:23.5	+30:07.9	0
30	63	(Sweden) Mattias Ekstrom	(Sweden) Christina Thorner	(Sweden) Mattias Ekstrom	Mitsubishi Lancer Evo IV	4:03:29.3	+34:13.7	0
31	74	(Sweden) Gert Blomqvist	(Sweden) Lena Lindberg	Peugeot Sport Sweden	Peugeot 306 S16	4:04:31.0	+35:15.4	0
32	80	(Denmark) Karsten Richardt	(Denmark) Frederiksen Ole Refsgaard	(Denmark) Karsten Richardt	Mitsubishi Lancer Evo IV	4:05:20.3	+36:04.7	0
33	33	(Finland) Toni Gardemeister	(Finland) Paavo Lukander	(Finland) Astra Racing	Seat Ibiza	4:05:33.0	+36:17.4	0
34	52	(Sweden) Andreas Eriksson	(Sweden) Patrick Henriksson	Volkswagen Motorsport Sweden	Volkswagen Golf II GTi 16V	4:05:48.1	+36:32.5	0
35	88	(Sweden) Fredrik Eljas	(Sweden) Sune Elofsson	(Sweden) Fredrik Eljas	Toyota Celica GT-Four	4:12:01.1	+42:45.5	0
36	83	(Sweden) Johan Jonsson	(Sweden) Mikael Persson	(Sweden) Johan Jonsson	SEAT Ibiza GTi 16V	4:14:19.8	+45:04.2	0
37	72	(Sweden) Clemens Andersson	(Sweden) Raymond Eriksson	(Sweden) Clemens Andersson	Opel Corsa GSi	4:14:43.2	+45:27.6	0
38	97	(Norway) Nils Tronrud	(Norway) Kjell Pettersen	(Norway) Nils Tronrud	Mitsubishi Lancer Evo V	4:15:35.3	+46:19.7	0
39	86	(Finland) Minna Lindroos	(Finland) Jani Laaksonen	(Finland) Minna Lindroos	Opel Astra GSi 16V	4:17:05.1	+47:49.5	0
40	75	(Sweden) Daniel Carlsson	(Sweden) Kent-Ake Stenback	(Sweden) Daniel Carlsson	Opel Astra GSi 16V	4:19:16.6	+50:01.0	0
41	67	(Belgium) Bob Colsoul	(Belgium) Tom Colsoul	(Belgium) Bob Colsoul	Mitsubishi Lancer Evo IV	4:21:51.9	+52:36.3	0
42	81	(Sweden) Joakim Roman	(Sweden) Thomas Andersson	(Sweden) Joakim Roman	Mitsubishi Lancer Evo III	4:22:05.1	+52:49.5	0
43	77	(Sweden) Peter Lindblom	(Sweden) Tommy Svedberg	(Sweden) Peter Lindblom	Citroen AX GTI	4:22:09.6	+52:54.5	0
44	85	(France) Stephane Caillet	(France) Christophe Valet	(France) Stephane Caillet	Peugeot 306 S16	4:23:51.0	+54:35.4	0
45	91	(France) Oliver Marty	(France) Vincent Ducher	(France) Oliver Marty	Peugeot 106	4:23:55.4	+54:39.8	0
46	53	(Spain) Salvador Canellas	(Spain) Carlos del Barrio	(Spain) Salvador Canellas	SEAT Ibiza	4:24:07.6	+54:52.0	0
47	94	(Japan) Wakujiro Kobayashi	(Japan) Mitsushiro Yamamoto	(Japan) Wakujiro Kobayashi	Mitsubishi Lancer Evo IV	4:31:16.1	+1:02:00.5	0
48	76	(Sweden) Mattias Aronsson	(Sweden) Rolf Andersson	(Sweden) Mattias Aronsson	Opel Astra GSi 16V	4:31:39.3	+1:02:23.7	0
49	107	(Sweden) Walter Olofsson	(Sweden) Kjell Andersson	(Sweden) Walter Olofsson	Suzuki Swift GTi	4:32:04.1	+1:02:48.5	0
50	105	(Sweden) Lasse Storm	(Sweden) Ulf Storm	(Sweden) Lasse Storm	Citroen AX GTI	4:32:28.0	+1:03:12.4	0
51	103	(Sweden) Anders Wann	(Sweden) Mikael Eriksson	(Sweden) Anders Wann	Suzuki Swift GTi	4:32:34.5	+1:03:18.9	0
52	98	(Sweden) Lars Johansson	(Sweden) Hans Gustavsson	(Sweden) Lars Johansson	Opel Astra GSi 16V	4:34:00.0	+1:04:44.4	0
53	95	(Germany) Jochen Walther	(Germany) Kay Treder	(Germany) Jochen Walther	Mazda 323	4:34:27.1	+1:05:11.5	0
54	96	(United Kingdom) Natalie Barratt	(United Kingdom) Stella Boyles	(United Kingdom) Natalie Barratt	Mitsubishi Lancer Evo IV	4:34:41.1	+1:05:11.5	0
55	106	(Sweden) Jorgen Jonsson	(Sweden) Christer Bergh	(Sweden) Jorgen Jonsson	Suzuki Swift GTi	4:35:27.4	+1:06:11.8	0
56	99	(Italy) Mauro Patrucco	(Italy) Grazia Bucci	(Italy) Mauro Patrucco	Honda Civic Type-R	4:37:33.5	+1:08:17.9	0
57	114	(France) Jacques Gleizes	(France) Jeaninie Porterat-Gleizes	(France) Jacques Gleizes	Citroen AX GTI	4:40:27.4	+1:11:11.8	0
58	92	(Sweden) Anders Floren	(Sweden) Curt Rosen	(Sweden) Anders Floren	Volkswagen Golf GTi	4:41:40.3	+1:12:24.7	0
59	93	(Finland) Heikki Salmen	(Finland) Juha Rinne	(Finland) Heikki Salmen	Mercedes-Benz C220	4:42:40.7	+1:13:25.1	0
60	112	(France) Daniel Duterte	(France) Aline Vielle	(France) Daniel Duterte	Peugeot 205	4:46:09.3	+1:16:53.7	0
61	109	(Germany) Siegfried Mayr	(Germany) Torsten Krautwald	(Germany) Siegfried Mayr	Suzuki Swift GTi	4:52:38.1	+1:23:22.5	0
62	108	(Sweden) Hans Sellberg	(Sweden) Bo Fransson	(Sweden) Hans Sellberg	Suzuki Swift GTi	5:03:53.4	+1:34:37.8	0
63	111	(Sweden) Jennie-Lee Hermansson	(Sweden) Stefan Bergman	(Sweden) Jennie-Lee Hermansson	Renault Clio 16S	5:14:55.3	+1:45:39.7	0
64	90	(Germany) Harry Brunken	(Germany) Lothar Schu	(Germany) Harry Brunken	Ford Escort RS Cosworth	5:16:28.2	+1:47:12.6	0
Retired SS19	27	(Sweden) Kenneth Eriksson	(Sweden) Staffon Parmander	(South Korea) Hyundai Motorsport	Hyundai Coupe	Engine		0
Retired SS19	60	(Sweden) Petter Akerstrom	(Sweden) Lennart Pullander	(Sweden) Petter Akerstrom	Toyota Celica GT-Four	Accident		0
Retired SS19	104	(Sweden) Joakim Gustavsson	(Sweden) Mikael Holmgren	(Sweden) Joakim Gustavsson	Volkswagen Polo GTi	Accident		0
Retired SS16	37	(Sweden) Mats Thorszelius	(Sweden) Niklas Fransson	(Sweden) Mats Thorszelius	Toyota Celica GT-Four	Retired		0
Retired SS16	44	(Sweden) Kristoffer Nilsson	(Sweden) Per Andersson	(Sweden) Kristoffer Nilsson	Subaru Impreza WRX STi	Accident		0
Retired SS13	26	(Finland) Juha Kangas	(Finland) Mika Ovaskainen	(Finland) Juha Kangas	Subaru Impreza GC8	Gearbox		0
Retired SS13	56	(Sweden) Bjorn Gustafsson	(Sweden) Jan Pettersson	(Sweden) Bjorn Gustafsson	Toyota Celica Turbo 4WD	Steering		0
Retired SS13	87	(Sweden) Birger Kvarnstrom	(Sweden) Peter Jansson	(Sweden) Birger Kvarnstrom	Nissan Sunny GTI-R	Driveshaft		0
Retired SS13	110	(Spain) Manuel Muniente	(Spain) Diego Vallejo	(Spain) Manuel Muniente	Peugeot 106	Gearbox		0
Retired SS12	30	(United Kingdom) Alister McRae	(United Kingdom) David Senior	(South Korea) Hyundai Motorsport	Hyundai Coupe	Electrical		0
Retired SS12	84	(Sweden) Daniel Ljung	(Sweden) Stefan Svensson	(Sweden) Daniel Ljung	Volkswagen Golf GTi 16V	Accident		0
Retired SS11	28	(Sweden) Jorgen Jonasson	(Sweden) Pecka Svensson	SEAT Dealer Team Sweden	SEAT Ibiza	Accident		0
Retired SS11	89	(Austria) Karl Rumpler	(Austria) Maria Rumpler	(Austria) Karl Rumpler	Ford Sierra RS Cosworth	Engine		0
Retired SS9	7	(United Kingdom) Colin McRae	(United Kingdom) Nicky Grist	(United Kingdom) Ford Motor Co Ltd	Ford Focus WRC 99	Engine		0
Retired SS9	21	(Finland) Juuso Pykalisto	(Finland) Esko Mertsalmi	Mitsubishi Ralliart Finland	Mitsubishi Carisma GT Evo IV	Engine		0
Retired SS9	54	(Sweden) Tomas 'Gullabo' Jansson	(Sweden) Lars Backman	Peugeot Sport Sweden	Peugeot 106 Maxi	Gearbox		0
Retired SS8	73	(Sweden) Peter Blomberg	(Sweden) Christer Tornberg	(Sweden) Peter Blomberg	Opel Corsa GSi	Accident		0
Retired SS7	102	(Italy) Roberto Ghiringhelli	(Italy) Stefano Cossi	(Italy) Roberto Ghiringhelli	Opel Calibra 16V	Retired		0
Retired SS6	62	(Sweden) Patrik Holmlund	(Sweden) Mikael Jansson	(Sweden) Patrik Holmlund	Subaru Impreza WRX	Gearbox		0
Retired SS6	64	(Sweden) Torgny Mogren	(Sweden) Morgan Sandberg	(Sweden) Torgny Mogren	Mitsubishi Lancer Evo III	Accident		0
Retired SS6	65	(Saudi Arabia) Abdullah Bakhashab	(United Kingdom) Michael Park	Toyota Team Saudi Arabia	Toyota Celica GT-Four	Suspension		0
Retired SS5	68	(Sweden) Lars-Goran Andersson	(Sweden) Mikael Johansson	(Sweden) Lars-Goran Andersson	Volkswagen Golf GTi 16V	Gearbox		0
Retired SS3	15	(Finland) Sebastian Lindholm	(Finland) Jukka Aho	(Russia) Gazprom Rally Team	Ford Escort WRC	Driveshaft		0
Retired SS3	34	(Sweden) Stig Blomqvist	(Sweden) Benny Melander	(United Kingdom) Ford Motor Co Ltd	Ford Puma	Driveshaft		0
Retired SS3	42	(Sweden) Kenneth Johansson	(Sweden) Goran Bergsten	(Sweden) Kenneth Johansson	Mitsubishi Lancer Evo IV	Clutch		0
Retired SS3	43	(Sweden) Pernilla Solberg	(Sweden) Ulrika Mattsson	(Sweden) Team Walfridsson	Mitsubishi Lancer Evo IV	Accident		0
Retired SS3	55	(Sweden) Christer Steen	(Sweden) Per Westman	(Sweden) Christer Steen	Skoda Felicia	Clutch		0
Retired SS3	58	(Norway) Helge Menkerud	(Norway) Engh Gunhild Hvaal	(Norway) Helge Menkerud	Ford Escort RS Cosworth	Clutch		0
Retired SS3	69	(Sweden) Mats Bergea	(Sweden) Mattias Andersson	Volkswagen Motorsport Sweden	Volkswagen Polo 16V	Accident		0
Retired SS3	70	(Finland) Jari Sipponen	(Finland) Petra Santala	(Finland) Jari Sipponen	Opel Astra GSi 16V	Driveshaft		0
Retired SS3	71	(Sweden) Peter Liwell	(Sweden) Tommy Wallin	(Sweden) Peter Liwell	Skoda Felicia	Accident		0
Retired SS3	100	(Norway) Tor Erik Rismyhr	(Norway) Hilding Haustreis	(Norway) Tor Erik Rismyhr	Honda Civic Type-R	Accident		0
Retired SS2	10	(Finland) Marcus Gronholm	(Finland) Tero Gardemeister	(Spain) SEAT Sport	SEAT Cordoba WRC	Engine		0
Retired SS2	82	(Finland) Kaj Kuistila	(Sweden) Tapio Palola	(Finland) Kaj Kuistila	Mitsubishi Lancer Evo V	Engine		0
Retired SS1	16	(Sweden) Mats Jonsson	(Sweden) Johnny Johansson	(Sweden) Bo-Be Plastindustri AB	Ford Escort WRC	Gearbox		0
Retired SS1	51	(Finland) Jani Pirttinen	(Finland) Timo Hantunen	(Finland) Jani Pirttinen	Volkswagen Golf GTi 16V	Accident		0
Retired SS1	66	(Estonia) Aleksander Kao	(Estonia) Aare Ojamae	(Estonia) Aleksander Kao	Mitsubishi Lancer Evo IV	Fuel Pump		0
Retired SS1	78	(Sweden) Pontus Stridh	(Sweden) Max Lindqvist	(Sweden) Pontus Stridh	Volkswagen Polo 16V	Accident		0

==== Special Stages ====
All dates and times are CET (UTC+1).

Day	Stage	Time	Name	Length (km)	Winner	Time	Rally leader
1 12 Feb	SS1	10:38	Malta	11.88	(Spain) Carlos Sainz	5:56.8	(Spain) Carlos Sainz
1 12 Feb	SS2	11:24	Sunnemo	30.87	(Finland) Tommi Makinen	15:17.5	(Spain) Carlos Sainz
1 12 Feb	SS3	12:52	Hamra	30.69	(Finland) Tommi Makinen	16:30.9	(Finland) Tommi Makinen
1 12 Feb	SS4	13:55	Torsby	4.00	(Spain) Carlos Sainz	2:13.4	(Finland) Tommi Makinen
1 12 Feb	SS5	15:03	Bjalverud	21.58	(Sweden) Thomas Radstrom	11:07.8	(Finland) Tommi Makinen
1 12 Feb	SS6	15:39	Mangen	22.09	(Spain) Carlos Sainz	12:30.8	(Spain) Carlos Sainz
1 12 Feb	SS7	17:41	Langjohanstorp	19.44	(Spain) Carlos Sainz	10:00.7	(Spain) Carlos Sainz
1 12 Feb	SS8	19:08	Kalvholmen	2.10	(Finland) Tommi Makinen	1:48.2	(Finland) Tommi Makinen
2 13 Feb	SS9	10:18	Sagen 1	14.76	(Finland) Tommi Makinen	8:01.9	(Finland) Tommi Makinen
2 13 Feb	SS10	11:07	Frederiksberg	27.83	(Finland) Tommi Makinen	16:15.6	(Finland) Tommi Makinen
2 13 Feb	SS11	13:13	Nyhammar	27.79	(Finland) Tommi Makinen	14:49.7	(Finland) Tommi Makinen
2 13 Feb	SS12	15:24	Jutbo	47.65	(Finland) Tommi Makinen	27:36.7	(Finland) Tommi Makinen
2 13 Feb	SS13	17:30	Skog	22.82	(Spain) Carlos Sainz	12:57.7	(Finland) Tommi Makinen
2 13 Feb	SS14	18:30	Lugnet	2.00	(Finland) Tommi Makinen	1:58.2	(Finland) Tommi Makinen
3 14 Feb	SS15	8:03	Stromsdal	13.93	(Finland) Tommi Makinen	6:51.8	(Finland) Tommi Makinen
3 14 Feb	SS16	8:56	Rammen 1	23.81	(Spain) Carlos Sainz	12:24.6	(Finland) Tommi Makinen
3 14 Feb	SS17	10:49	Sagen 2	14.76	(France) Didier Auriol	7:59.1	(Finland) Tommi Makinen
3 14 Feb	SS18	10:49	Rammen 2	23.81	(Spain) Carlos Sainz	12:22.7	(Finland) Tommi Makinen
3 14 Feb	SS19	14:00	Mangstorp	22.49	(France) Didier Auriol	11:53.7	(Finland) Tommi Makinen

==== Championship Standings ====
Pos.	Drivers' Championship			Manufacturers' Championship		
Pos.	Move	Driver	Points	Move	Manufacturer	Points
1		(Finland) Tommi Makinen	20		(Japan) Marlboro Mitsubishi Ralliart	20
2		(Finland) Juha Kankkunen	7	2	(Japan) Toyota Castrol Team	13
3		(France) Didier Auriol	7	1	(Japan) Subaru World Rally Team	10
4	3	(Spain) Carlos Sainz	6	1	(Spain) SEAT Sport	5
5	2	(Sweden) Thomas Radstrom	4		(United Kingdom) Ford Motor Co Ltd	4
