= Federico van der Hoeven =

Spanish racing driver

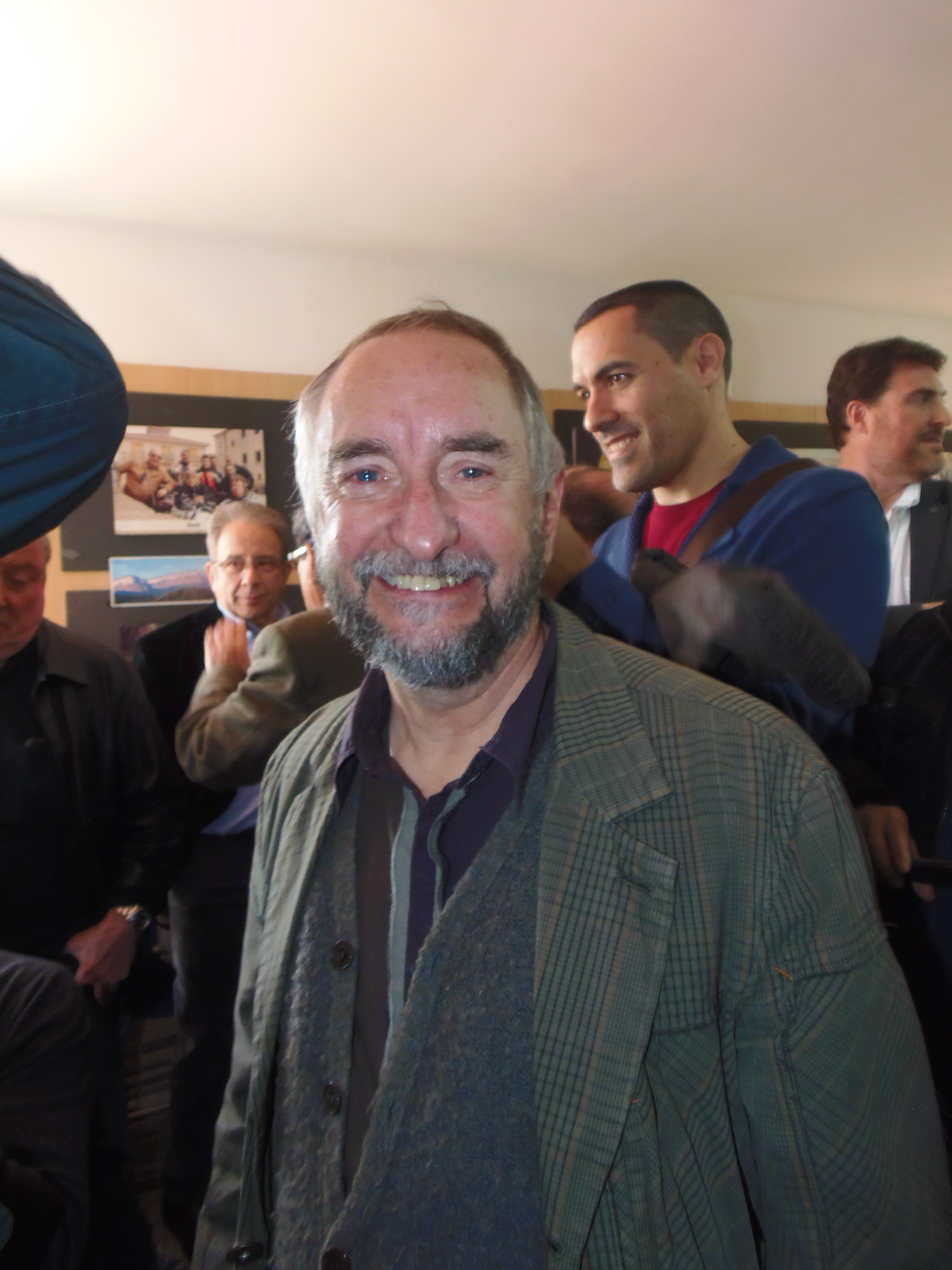
- Federico van der Hoeven in 2017
- Nationality: (Spain) Spanish (Netherlands) Dutch
- Born: 1951 (age 74–75); Brussels, Belgium
Motorcycle racing career statistics
Grand Prix motorcycle racing
Active years	1970 - 1971
First race	1970 50cc Spanish Grand Prix
Last race	1971 50cc Spanish Grand Prix
Team(s)	Kreidler; Derbi
Championships	0
Starts / Wins / Podiums / Poles / F. laps / Points; 4 / 0 / 0 / 0 / 0 / 26

Federico van der Hoeven (born 1951) is a Spanish former motorcycle racer and auto racing driver. He raced motorcycles, formula cars and rally cars throughout the 1970s and 1980s. Van der Hoeven was born in Brussels, Belgium to a Dutch father and a Spanish mother. Throughout his career, Van der Hoeven drove under a Spanish licence.

== Racing career ==
=== Motorcycle racing ===
Van der Hoeven first appeared in the F.I.M. Road Racing World Championship Grand Prix championship in 1970. The Dutch/Spanish rider made his debut at the Spanish motorcycle Grand Prix at the famous Montjuïc circuit in the 50cc class. The debutant finished his Kreidler in seventh place. The lightweight driver, weighing just 40 kg, was signed by Derbi to compete the 1971 season alongside Angel Nieto. The season started well for Van der Hoeven with a fourth place at the Austrian motorcycle Grand Prix and again finishing fourth at the West German motorcycle Grand Prix. Van der Hoeven missed a number of races and returned at the Spanish motorcycle Grand Prix. The race ended in deception as the whole Derbi team struggled. Angel Nieto lost the title and Van der Hoeven failed to finish the race. Van der Hoeven eventually finished seventh in the season standings. He did not appear in any more world championship motorcycle events.

=== Formula racing ===
In 1973, Van der Hoeven made his debut in the Spanish Formula 1430 championship, winning a race at Jarama Circuit. Racing a SEAT powered Selex ST3, Van der Hoeven dominated the 1974 season winning the title. Van der Hoeven also competed the Selex ST3 in the Montseny hillclimb. The Spanish driver ended the hillclimb in tenth place, between two Porsche 911's. The following year Van der Hoeven graduated into the Formula 1800. Aiming to reach the prestigious Formula 3 championship, Van der Hoeven struggled for sponsorship. At Jarama, Van der Hoeven finished fourth in the first round of the championship competing a Martini chassis.

In 1977, Van der Hoeven appeared on the entry list of the first round of the British F3 championship at Silverstone. The car, a March 773, and driver failed to attend.

=== Rally racing ===
Van der Hoeven competed in three rally races in the European Rally Championship in 1972, 1973 and 1973 as a co-driver. In 1972, Van der Hoeven was supporting driver Salvador Cañellas. Their SEAT 1430 finished in fourth place at the Rally Costa Brava. At the 1973 Rally of Spain, Van der Hoeven supported Haldi Claude to a third place in their Porsche 911 Carrera RS. The team returned in 1974 winning the famous rally.
