= Hispakart =

- Industry: Automotive
- Founded: 1961
- Founder: Ramón López Villalba
- Defunct: early 1990s
- Headquarters: Madrid, Spain

Hispakart was a Spanish kart and racing car constructor based in Madrid, Spain. The company was founded in 1961 by Ramon Lopez Villalba.

== History ==
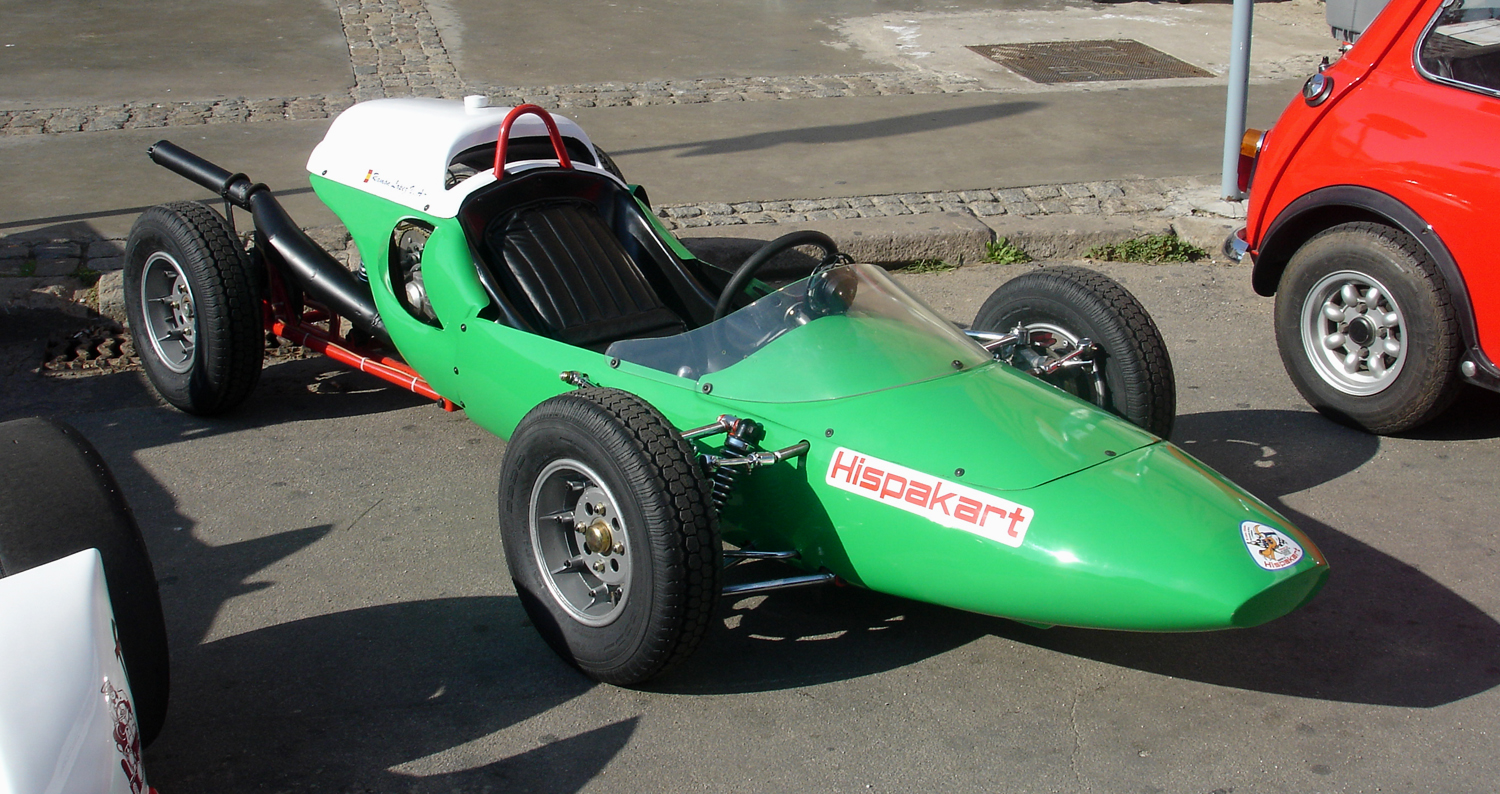
Hispakart Formula 4

Ramon Lopez achieved degrees in mechanics while doing military service at Aeródromo Militar de León in 1952. After working as an airplane mechanic at Iberia and Aviaco Lopez went to work in his fathers garage in Madrid. In 1958 Lopez met Demetrio del Val, a Spanish motorcyclist who went to the U.S. to race karts. Lopez built his first kart with a Montesa engine and Vespa tyres. Lopez entered Portuguese driver Serafín Martins in a kart race at Buen Retiro Park on November 1, 1960. Martins won the race in the Lopez built 'Plantilla'. Hispakart was founded in 1961. Demetrio del Val ordered seven karts. The following year a kart team was created: Los Diablos Rojos (The Red Devils). The team was composed of Lopez, Martins and American driver Robert Shelton. Shelton was based at Torrejón Air Base, near Madrid. The Hispakarts were powered by McCulloch engines. The team achieved countless victories. Lopez competed in the 100cc Karting World Championships racing against Ronnie Peterson, Toine Hezemans and many others.

Hispakart started constructing racing cars in 1965. After seeing Tecno Formula 4 cars Lopez decided to start constructing cars for the Spanish championship. Jorge de Bagration imported a Tecno K250 and showed it to Lopez. Lopez copied the design and chassis without a licence to do so. Hispakart built 26 chassis. Prince Luitpold of Bavaria was one of the drivers. Hispakart had become one of the largest Formula 4 constructors in Spain. In 1968 Hispakart built the GT. Influenced by the Artes Campeador, built by Selex, the car was unveiled at the 1967 Barcelona Motor Show. The car had a tubular steel chassis and a fiberglass bodywork. The bodywork was built but the car was never completed.

SEAT launched the Formula 1430 in 1971. The class was effectively the successor of the Formula 4. Hispakarts first Formula 1430 car was built from unsold parts from the Formula 4 cars. Gregorio van Dulken started the first ever Formula 1430 race in a Hispakart from the second starting place. Van Dulken did not finish the race as he was involved in a multi car accident. Selex and Lynx dominated the Formula 1430. Argentine driver Carlos Alberto Jarque, managed by Juan Manuel Fangio, entered the Formula 1430 championship in 1974. But the season was disappointing and Jarque could not achieve any notable results.

In 1972 a fire broke out in the Hispakart workshop located at the Calle de Padilla in Madrid. The workshop, and all the cars in it, were completely destroyed. Lopez opened a new workshop at Calle de Palermo. The company did not construct any more racing cars. Lopez started a Renault dealership. Hispakart continue to design and build new karts and trailers until the 1990s.

== Cars ==
Year	Car	Class
1960	Plantilla	Kart
1965	Hispakart Formula 4	Formula 4
1968	Hispakart GT	Grand tourer
1971	Hispakart	Formula 1430
