= Gareth Wild =

Parking challenge completist

Gareth Wild is a production director who, in 2021, completed a six-year self-administered challenge to park in all 211 legal parking spaces in his local Sainsbury's car park in Bromley, Greater London. This achievement and his method of doing so went viral online, attributed to its timing during the COVID-19 pandemic and Wild's dedication to the mundane challenge for an extended amount of time, and received coverage in the national and international press. In 2026 Wild completed a second challenge, parking in all 108 parking spots of the Sainsbury's in Devizes, Wiltshire.

== Challenge ==
Sainsbury's Bromley car park

Wild, a production director for Explosive Alan Productions, thought of the challenge in 2015 while doing his weekly shop, having done so at the same shop for a decade. He had initially decided to simply log the spaces in which he had parked in his local Sainsbury's car park, but soon decided to make a game out of this. He created a spreadsheet to log the spaces he had parked in and created a plan, taking a screenshot of the car park in Google Maps, dividing the car park into lettered sections and assigning numbers to its individual spaces. Wild initially believed he could complete the challenge in four years.

Each time Wild drove to the supermarket, he logged the space in which he had parked on his mobile phone and added it to his spreadsheet upon returning home. Over the course of the challenge, he attempted to seek out parking spaces which he had identified as in high demand so as not to "bottleneck" his approach. He did not illegally park in handicap or motorcycle spaces, and only parked in one spot per trip. He sometimes took trips later at night which allowed him to park in the spaces which were highest in demand, but has stated that he never went to the shop to intentionally park in a specific space, describing this as the "car parking equivalent of doping."

Two years into the challenge, Wild had his first child, allowing him to park in family spaces and bringing the total spaces he was required to park in to 211. He has said that the impatience of his children did mean that he would "have to sometimes just park wherever was closest and accept that I wouldn't be claiming a new space that day." Wild went through three different cars over the course of the challenge; a Ford Puma, a Honda Jazz and a Skoda Octavia. Wild has partially credited the COVID-19 pandemic for the challenge taking six years, two years longer than he initially predicted, as shoppers in the United Kingdom were encouraged to only shop if it were absolutely necessary during the pandemic.

Gareth Wild
(@GarethWild)
tweeted:

For the last six years I’ve kept a spreadsheet listing every parking spot I’ve used at the local supermarket in a bid to park in them all. This week I completed my Magnum Opus! A thread.

27 April 2021

Wild has said that his completion of the challenge was "inevitable" once he had parked in all the spaces except "the last 20 or 30", and that he "was getting one each week". He completed his challenge on 24 April 2021, finishing by parking in the space he coded F20, after which he felt "a moment of elation". He was age 39 at the time. Following his success, he posted a thread about his completion of the challenge on Twitter, calling it his "magnum opus". He additionally provided a guide of the best and worst spaces in the car park.

In terms of a repeat attempt, Wild stated that a Lidl car park near where he lived would be a potential candidate, but said that he was "probably done with car parks.” However, having relocated to Devizes, Wild completed a second challenge, parking in all 108 parking spots of the Sainsbury's in his new home town.

== Responses ==
The announcement that Wild had completed the challenge was positive, with his post on Twitter receiving over 100,000 likes by 28 April. Wild attributed this to people enjoying "a nerdy challenge" and that "people love a spreadsheet." The tweets prompted others to describe their similar exploits, such as one user who had mapped over 70 potholes in his town, classifying them for severity. Wild took advantage of the virality by asking viewers to donate to a local food bank, causing donations to come in from across the world. He also stated that he was asked by other supermarkets had asked him to do the same challenge at their stores, including one which promised to donate money to charity for every ten spaces he parked in to go shopping. His story received coverage on BBC News, The Guardian, The New York Times, and The Daily Telegraph.

Thomas Fletcher, chairman of the Leisure Studies Association and associate professor at Leeds Beckett University, said he had "never heard of anything like this, to be brutally honest," and called it "completely bonkers". He said that it was likely popular due to a constraining of hobbies as a result of the COVID-19 pandemic, the extended time it took to complete, and Wild taking the relatively mundane task seriously.
