= 1971 German Formula Three Championship =

Seasons
- ← none 1972 →

The 1971 German Formula Three Championship (German: 1971 ADAC Preis der Formel 3) was a multi-event motor racing championship for single-seat open wheel formula racing cars held across Germany. The championship featured drivers competing in two-litre Formula Three racing cars which conformed to the technical regulations, or formula, for the championship. It commenced on 11 April at Nürburgring and ended at Mendig on 29 August after six rounds.

Manfred Mohr became a champion. He won the season opener. Dieter Kern finished as runner-up, winning race at Bremgarten. Hermann Unold completed the top-three in the drivers' standings.

The scoring system was 20-15-12-10-8-6-4-3-2-1 points awarded to the first ten finishers. All results counted towards the driver's final tally. Only German drivers were awarded points. So, in races that had entries of drivers from other countries, these drivers were not eligible for points.

== Calendar ==
All rounds were held in West Germany.

Round	Location	Circuit	Date	Supporting
1	Nürburg, West Germany	Nürburgring	11 April	VI. ADAC-300-km-Rennen um den "Good Year-Pokal"
2	Bremgarten, West Germany	Bremgarten	23 May	2. Markgräfler ADAC-Flugplatzrennen Bremgarten
3	Diepholz, West Germany	Diepholz Airfield Circuit	18 July	4. ADAC-Flugplatzrennen Diepholz
4	Niederstetten, West Germany	Niederstetten Air Base	15 August	4. Hohenloher ADAC-Flugplatz-Rennen Niederstetten
5	Kassel-Calden, West Germany	Kassel-Calden Circuit	22 August	ADAC-Hessen-Preis
6	Mendig, West Germany	Mendig Air Base	29 August	3. ADAC Flugplatzrennen Mendigs

== Championship standings ==
- Points are awarded as follows:

1	2	3	4	5	6	7	8	9	10
20	15	12	10	8	6	4	3	2	1

Pos	Driver	NÜR	BRE	DIE	NIE	KAS	MEN	Points
1	(West Germany) Manfred Mohr	1		2	2		2	65
2	(West Germany) Dieter Kern	2	1		7	3		51
3	(West Germany) Hermann Unold	5		3	5	2	6	49
4	(West Germany) Willi Deutsch	7		4	9	1	3	48
5	(West Germany) Hannelore Werner	8	2		1			38
6	(West Germany) Wilhelm Geiss		4	5	6	5	7	36
7	(West Germany) Wolfgang Bülow	3	9		4		4	34
8	(West Germany) Erwin Derichs			6		4	5	24
9	(West Germany) Willi Sommer		3		3			24
10	(West Germany) Jochen Mass						1	20
11	(West Germany) Carlo Breidenstein			1				20
12	(West Germany) Josef Kremer	6	8		8	9		14
13	(West Germany) Klaus Enders		6			6		12
14	(West Germany) Franz Pesch	4						10
15	(West Germany) Felix Martin		5					8
16	(West Germany) Wilfried Holder		7					4
17	(West Germany) Sigi Hofmann			7				4
18	(West Germany) Jorg Obermoser					7		4
19	(West Germany) Dietmar Floer			8				3
20	(West Germany) Dieter Gorsch					8		3
21	(West Germany) Thomas Betzler					10		1
Pos	Driver	NÜR	BRE	DIE	NIE	KAS	MEN	Points

Colour	Result
Gold	Winner
Silver	Second place
Bronze	Third place
Green	Points classification
Blue	Non-points classification
Blue	Non-classified finish (NC)
Purple	Retired, not classified (Ret)
Red	Did not qualify (DNQ)
Red	Did not pre-qualify (DNPQ)
Black	Disqualified (DSQ)
White	Did not start (DNS)
White	Withdrew (WD)
White	Race cancelled (C)
Blank	Did not practice (DNP)
Blank	Did not arrive (DNA)
Blank	Excluded (EX)

**Bold** – Pole
Italics – Fastest Lap
