= 1973 in motorsport =

The following is an overview of the events of 1973 in motorsport including the major racing events, motorsport venues that were opened and closed during a year, championships and non-championship events that were established and disestablished in a year, and births and deaths of racing drivers and other motorsport people.

== Annual events ==
The calendar includes only annual major non-championship events or annual events that had significance separate from the championship. For the dates of the championship events see related season articles.

Date	Event	Ref
3–4 February	12th 24 Hours of Daytona	
18 February	15th Daytona 500	
6 May	57th Targa Florio	
28–30 May	57th Indianapolis 500	
3 June	31st Monaco Grand Prix	
4–8 June	55th Isle of Man TT	
9–10 June	41st 24 Hours of Le Mans	
23–24 June	4th 24 Hours of Nurburgring	
21–22 July	25th 24 Hours of Spa	
30 September	14th Hardie-Ferodo 1000	
18 November	20th Macau Grand Prix	

== Births ==
Date	Month	Name	Nationality	Occupation	Note	Ref
14	January	Giancarlo Fisichella	Italian	Racing driver	Winner of the 3 Formula One Grand Prix.	
27	January	Yoshihide Muroya	Japanese	Air racer	Red Bull Air World Race champion (2017).	
1	March	Ryo Michigami	Japanese	Racing driver	All Japan GTC champion (2000).	
3	March	Jason Bright	Australian	Racing driver	1998 FAI 1000 winner.	
19	May	Dario Franchitti	British	Racing driver	Indianapolis 500 winner (2007, 2010, 2012).	
4	July	Jan Magnussen	Danish	Racing driver	Danish Touringcar champion (2003, 2008).	
25	July	Kenny Roberts Jr.	American	Motorcycle racer	500cc Grand Prix motorcycle racing World champion (2000).	
20	November	Neil Hodgson	British	Motorcycle racer	Superbike World champion (2003).	
1	December	Andrea Bertolini	Italian	Racing driver	Champion of the FIA GT Championship in 2006, 2008-2009 and FIA GT1 World Championship in 2010.	

== Deaths ==
Date	Month	Name	Age	Nationality	Occupation	Note	Ref
30	March	Yves Giraud-Cabantous	68	French	Racing driver	One of the first French Formula One drivers.	
5	April	David Murray	63	British	Racing driver	One of the first British Formula One drivers.	
15	April	Ernst Klodwig	69	German	Racing driver	The first East German Formula One driver.	
6	October	François Cevert	29	French	Racing driver	1971 United States Grand Prix winner.	

== See also ==
- List of 1973 motorsport champions
