= SELEX =

SELEX may refer to one of the following:

- Selex ES, previously Finmeccanica's defence and security electronics business, now merged into Leonardo-Finmeccanica (new name of Finmeccanica)
- SELEX Sistemi Integrati, previously Finmeccanica's civil and military radar company, which became part of Selex ES (in turn merged into Leonardo-Finmeccanica)
- SELEX Elsag, previously Finmeccanica's military and civil communications systems supplier, which became part of Selex ES (in turn merged into Leonardo-Finmeccanica)
- Systematic evolution of ligands by exponential enrichment, a molecular biology technique used in drug development
- SEgmented Large-X baryon spectrometer EXperiment, a Fermilab study
- Selex Competition, a former constructor of racing cars
- Selex Gruppo Commerciale is an Italian large-scale retailer operating under different brands
