= List of 1973 motorsport champions =

1973 motorsport champions
Previous: 1972	Next: 1974

This list of 1973 motorsport champions is a list of national or international auto racing series with a Championship decided by the points or positions earned by a driver from multiple races.

== Drag racing ==
Series	Champion	Refer
NHRA Drag Racing Series	Top Fuel: (United States) Jerry Ruth	1973 NHRA Drag Racing Series
NHRA Drag Racing Series	Funny Car: (United States) Frank Hall	1973 NHRA Drag Racing Series
NHRA Drag Racing Series	Pro Stock: (United States) Wayne Gapp	1973 NHRA Drag Racing Series

== Karting ==
Series	Driver	Season article
Karting World Championship	(United Kingdom) Terry Fullerton	
Karting World Championship	Junior: (France) Alain Prost	
Karting European Championship	(Italy) Gabriele Gorini	

== Motorcycle racing ==
Series	Rider	Season article
500cc World Championship	(United Kingdom) Phil Read	1973 Grand Prix motorcycle racing season
350cc World Championship	(Italy) Giacomo Agostini	1973 Grand Prix motorcycle racing season
250cc World Championship	(West Germany) Dieter Braun	1973 Grand Prix motorcycle racing season
125cc World Championship	(Sweden) Kent Andersson	1973 Grand Prix motorcycle racing season
50cc World Championship	(Netherlands) Jan de Vries	1973 Grand Prix motorcycle racing season
Speedway World Championship	(Poland) Jerzy Szczakiel	1973 Individual Speedway World Championship
Formula 750	(United Kingdom) Barry Sheene	1973 Formula 750 season

=== Motocross ===
Series	Rider	Season article
FIM Motocross World Championship	500cc: (Belgium) Roger De Coster	1973 FIM Motocross World Championship
FIM Motocross World Championship	250cc: (Sweden) Håkan Andersson	1973 FIM Motocross World Championship
AMA Motocross Championship	500cc: (Netherlands) Pierre Karsmakers	1973 AMA Motocross National Championship season
AMA Motocross Championship	250cc: (United States) Gary Jones	1973 AMA Motocross National Championship season

== Open wheel racing ==
Series	Driver	Season article
Formula One World Championship	(United Kingdom) Jackie Stewart	1973 Formula One season
Formula One World Championship	Constructors: (United Kingdom) Lotus-Ford	1973 Formula One season
USAC National Championship	(United States) Roger McCluskey	1973 USAC Championship Car season
European Formula Two Championship	(France) Jean-Pierre Jarier	1973 European Formula Two Championship
European Formula 5000 Championship	(Belgium) Teddy Pilette	1973 Rothmans 5000 European Championship
Tasman Series	(New Zealand) Graham McRae	1973 Tasman Series
All-Japan Formula 2000 Championship	(Japan) Motoharu Kurosawa	1973 All-Japan Formula 2000 Championship
Australian Drivers' Championship	(Australia) John McCormack	1973 Australian Drivers' Championship
Australian Formula 2 Championship	(Australia) Leo Geoghegan	1973 Australian Formula 2 Championship
Formula Nacional	(Spain) Juan Villacieros	1973 Formula Nacional
Cup of Peace and Friendship	(Czechoslovakia) Albín Patlejch	1973 Cup of Peace and Friendship
Cup of Peace and Friendship	Nations: East Germany	1973 Cup of Peace and Friendship
SCCA Continental Championship	(South Africa) Jody Scheckter	1973 SCCA L&M Championship
SCCA Formula Super Vee	(Sweden) Bertil Roos	1973 SCCA Formula Super Vee season
South African Formula One Championship	(South Africa) Dave Charlton	1973 South African Formula One Championship
Formula Three
Lombank Formula 3 Championship (British F3)	(United Kingdom) Tony Brise	1973 British Formula Three season
John Player Formula 3 Championship (British F3)	(United Kingdom) Tony Brise	1973 British Formula Three season
Forward Trust Formula 3 Championship (British F3)	(United Kingdom) Ian Taylor	1973 British Formula Three season
Chilean Formula Three Championship	(Chile) Juan Carlos Silva	1973 Chilean Formula Three Championship
French Formula Three Championship	(France) Jacques Laffite	1973 French Formula Three Championship
French Formula Three Championship	Teams: (France) Oreca	1973 French Formula Three Championship
German Formula Three Championship	(Germany) Willi Deutsch	1973 German Formula Three Championship
Italian Formula Three Championship	(Italy) Carlo Giorgio	1973 Italian Formula Three Championship
Italian Formula Three Championship	Teams: (Italy) Trivellato Racing	1973 Italian Formula Three Championship
Soviet Formula 3 Championship	(Soviet Union) Yuri Andreev	1973 Soviet Formula 3 Championship
Formula Ford
Australian Formula Ford Series	(Australia) John Leffler	1973 TAA Formula Ford Driver to Europe Series
Brazilian Formula Ford Championship	(Brazil) Alex Ribeiro	
Danish Formula Ford Championship	(Denmark) Jac Nellemann	
Dutch Formula Ford 1600 Championship	(Netherlands) Roelof Wunderink	
German Formula Ford Championship	(Germany) Tibor Meray	
New Zealand Formula Ford Championship	(New Zealand) Dave McMillan	
Swedish Formula Ford Championship	(Sweden) Håkan Dahlqvist	

== Rallying ==
Series	Driver/Co-Driver	Season article
World Rally Championship	(France) Alpine-Renault	1973 World Rally Championship season
Australian Rally Championship	(Australia) Peter Lang	1973 Australian Rally Championship
Australian Rally Championship	Co-Drivers: (Australia) Warwick Smith	1973 Australian Rally Championship
British Rally Championship	(United Kingdom) Roger Clark	1973 British Rally Championship
British Rally Championship	Co-Drivers: (United Kingdom) Jim Porter	1973 British Rally Championship
Canadian Rally Championship	(Canada) Walter Boyce	1973 Canadian Rally Championship
Canadian Rally Championship	Co-Drivers: (Canada) Doug Woods	1973 Canadian Rally Championship
Deutsche Rallye Meisterschaft	(Germany) Gerd Behret	
Estonian Rally Championship	(Estonian Soviet Socialist Republic) Kaarel-Ain Viirok	1973 Estonian Rally Championship
Estonian Rally Championship	Co-Drivers: (Estonian Soviet Socialist Republic) Arvi Bachmann	1973 Estonian Rally Championship
European Rally Championship	(Italy) Sandro Munari	1973 European Rally Championship
European Rally Championship	Co-Drivers: (Italy) Mario Mannucci	1973 European Rally Championship
Finnish Rally Championship	Group 1: (Finland) Kyösti Hämäläinen	1973 Finnish Rally Championship
Finnish Rally Championship	Group 2: (Finland) Timo Mäkinen	1973 Finnish Rally Championship
French Rally Championship	(France) Jean-Luc Thérier	
Italian Rally Championship	(Italy) Amilcare Ballestrieri	
Italian Rally Championship	Co-Drivers: (Italy) Silvio Maiga	
Italian Rally Championship	Manufacturers: (Italy) Lancia	
Polish Rally Championship	(Poland) Sobiesław Zasada	
Scottish Rally Championship	(United Kingdom) Drew Gallacher	
Scottish Rally Championship	Co-Drivers: (United Kingdom) Ian Muir	
South African National Rally Championship	(South Africa) Louis Cloete	
South African National Rally Championship	Co-Drivers: (South Africa) Christo Kuun	
South African National Rally Championship	Manufacturers: (Japan) Datsun	
Spanish Rally Championship	(Spain) Jorge Babler	
Spanish Rally Championship	Co-Drivers: (Spain) Ricardo Antonlín	

== Sports car and GT ==
Series	Driver	Season article
World Sportscar Championship	Class S: (France) Matra	1973 World Sportscar Championship
World Sportscar Championship	Class GT: (Germany) Porsche	1973 World Sportscar Championship
Canadian American Challenge Cup	(United States) Mark Donohue	1973 Can-Am season
Australian Sports Car Championship	(Australia) Phil Moore	1973 Australian Sports Car Championship
IMSA GT Championship	(United States) Peter Gregg	1973 IMSA GT Championship

== Stock car racing ==
Series	Driver	Season article
NASCAR Winston Cup Series	(United States) Benny Parsons	1973 NASCAR Winston Cup Series
NASCAR Winston Cup Series	Manufacturers: (United States) Chevrolet	1973 NASCAR Winston Cup Series
NASCAR Winston West Series	(United States) Jack McCoy	1973 NASCAR Winston West Series
ARCA Racing Series	(United States) Ron Hutcherson	1973 ARCA Racing Series
Turismo Carretera	(Argentina) Nasif Estéfano	1973 Turismo Carretera
USAC Stock Car National Championship	(United States) Butch Hartman	1973 USAC Stock Car National Championship

== Touring car ==
Series	Driver	Season article
European Touring Car Championship	(Netherlands) Toine Hezemans	1973 European Touring Car Championship
Australian Touring Car Championship	(Canada) Allan Moffat	1973 Australian Touring Car Championship
British Saloon Car Championship	(Australia) Frank Gardner	1973 British Saloon Car Championship
Deutsche Rennsport Meisterschaft	(Germany) Dieter Glemser	1973 Deutsche Rennsport Meisterschaft
South Pacific Touring Series	(Australia) Peter Brock	1973 South Pacific Touring Series

== See also ==
- List of motorsport championships
- Auto racing
