= Hartheim am Rhein =

- Municipality
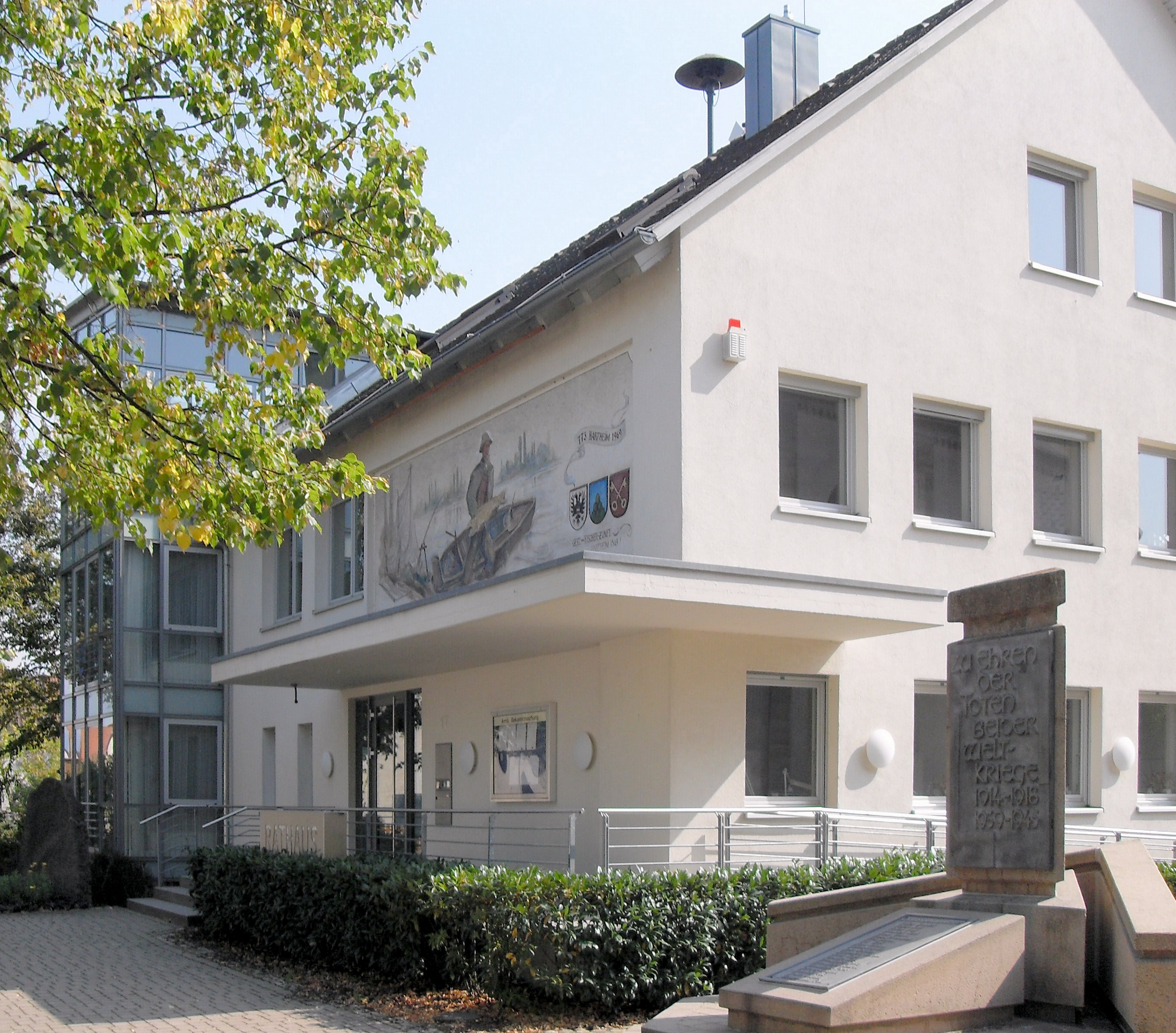
- Town hall

- Coat of arms

- Location of Hartheim am Rhein within Breisgau-Hochschwarzwald district
- Interactive map of Hartheim am Rhein
- Location within Germany Location within Baden-Württemberg
- Coordinates: 47°56′12″N 07°37′40″E
- Country: Germany
- State: Baden-Württemberg
- Admin. region: Freiburg
- District: Breisgau-Hochschwarzwald

Government
  - Mayor (2017–25): Stefan Ostermaier

Area
  - Total: 26.05 km^{2} (10.06 sq mi)
- Elevation: 206 m (676 ft)

Population (2025-12-31)
  - Total: 4,932
  - Density: 189.3/km^{2} (490.4/sq mi)
- Time zone: UTC+01:00 (CET)
  - Summer (DST): UTC+02:00 (CEST)
- Postal codes: 79258
- Dialling codes: 07633
- Vehicle registration: FR
- Website: www.hartheiminfo.de

Hartheim am Rhein (German pronunciation: [ˈhaʁtˌhaɪm ʔam ˈʁaɪn], lit. 'Hartheim on the Rhine') is a municipality in the Breisgau-Hochschwarzwald district, Baden-Württemberg, Germany with about 5000 inhabitants.

The districts of Hartheim am Rhein are Bremgarten, Feldkirch and Hartheim. For the first time, Hartheim am Rhein is referred to in the Lorsch Codex in 772.

In 2012, the name of the town was changed from Hartheim to Hartheim am Rhein.

== Local council (Gemeinderat) ==
Elections in May 2014:

- Freie Wähler Württemberg (Free voters):28,8 %=5 seats
- CDU: 27,6 %=4 seats
- Für unsere Dörfer (FuD) (For our villages): 22,7 %=4 seats
- Frauenliste Deutschland-Kommunale Frauenlisten (Women's list):11,9 %=2 seats
- SPD 9,0 %=1 seat

== Mayors ==
- 1946–1969: Josef Widmann
- 1969–1982: Alfred Vonarb
- 1982–2001: Erich Dilger († 29. Juli 2001)
- 2002–2009: Martin Singler
- 2010–2017: Kathrin Schönberger
- since 2017: Stefan Ostermaier

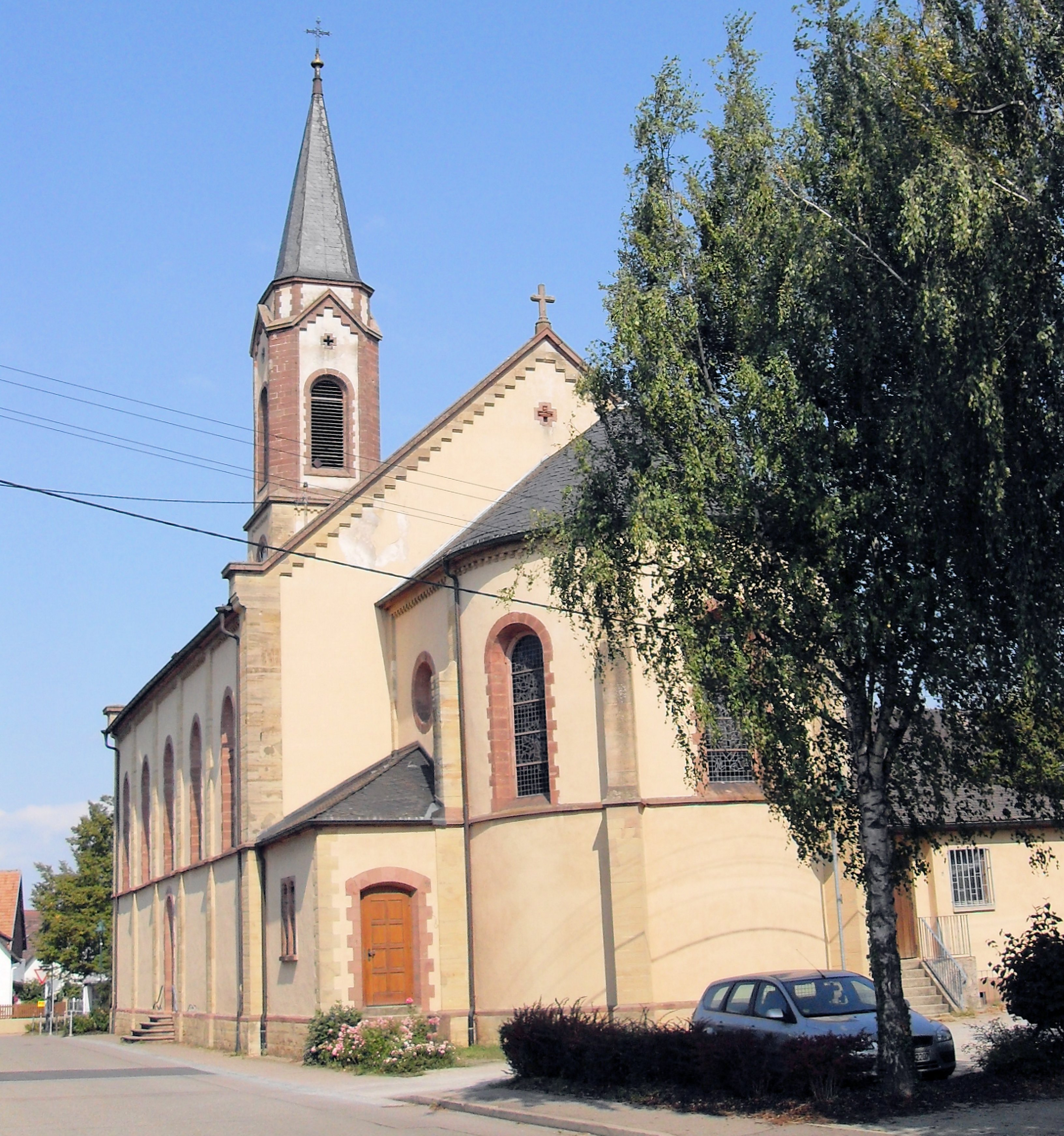
St. Peter-and-Paul-Church Hartheim
