= The Trojan Horse (car) =

The Trojan Horse was a world champion funny car owned by Larry Fullerton from the late 1960s until his death in 1981. Larry Fullerton and the Trojan Horse won the 1972 NHRA world championship setting a then world record.
