= 1972 AMA Motocross National Championship season =

1972 AMA Motocross Championship season

Seasons
- ← 1971 1973 →

The 1972 AMA Motocross Championship season was the 1st AMA Motocross National Championship season.

== Summary ==
1972 marked the inaugural year for the AMA Motocross National Championship. Brad Lackey dominated the 500cc class ahead of Gary Jones and Wyman Priddy. In 1972, after the season-ending 500cc race on September 2, American riders competing for the AMA national championship continued to accumulate points counting towards the national championship while they competed in the 1972 Trans-AMA motocross series which began on October 1 and hosted visiting European riders from the Motocross World Championship.

Jones claimed the 250cc championship ahead of his Yamaha teammate, Jimmy Weinert.

== Nationals ==
=== 500cc ===
Round	Date	Location	Winner	Team	Report
1	April 16	Atlanta, Georgia	(United States) Barry Higgins	ČZ	Report
2	May 7	Memphis, Tennessee	(United States) Barry Higgins	ČZ	Report
3	May 14	Sacramento, California	(United States) Brad Lackey	ČZ	Report
4	May 21	Saddleback Park, Orange, California	(United States) Brad Lackey	ČZ	Report
5	May 28	Carlsbad Raceway	(United States) Brad Lackey	ČZ	Report
6	June 11	Washington, Indiana	(United States) Wyman Priddy	ČZ	Report
7	June 18	Tahoe Vista, California	(United States) Brad Lackey	ČZ	Report
8	September 2	Alabama International Motor Speedway	(United States) Brad Lackey	Kawasaki	Report

==== Trans-AMA Series ====
Round	Date	Location	Top American	Team	Report
9	October 1	Linnville, Ohio	(United States) Bryan Kenney	Maico	Report
10	October 8	St. Peters, Missouri	(United States) Brad Lackey	Kawasaki	Report
11	October 15	Atlanta, Georgia	(United States) Jimmy Weinert	Yamaha	Report
12	October 22	Orlando, Florida	(United States) Brad Lackey	Kawasaki	Report
13	October 29	Houston, Texas	(United States) Brad Lackey	Kawasaki	Report
14	November 5	Carlsbad Raceway	(United States) Brad Lackey	Kawasaki	Report
15	November 12	Phoenix, Arizona	(United States) Brad Lackey	Kawasaki	Report
16	November 19	Puyallup, Washington	(United States) Brad Lackey	Kawasaki	Report
17	November 26	Livermore, California	(United States) Brad Lackey	Kawasaki	Report
18	December 3	Saddleback Park, Orange, California	(United States) Marty Tripes	ČZ	Report

=== 250cc ===
Round	Date	Location	Winner	Team	Report
1	April 16	Atlanta, Georgia	Sonny DeFeo	ČZ	Report
2	May 7	Memphis, Tennessee	Sonny DeFeo	ČZ	Report
3	May 14	Sacramento, California	Gunnar Lindstrom	Husqvarna	Report
4	May 21	Saddleback Park, Orange, California	Jim Pomeroy	Bultaco	Report
5	May 28	Carlsbad Raceway	Gary Jones	Yamaha	Report
6	June 11	Washington, Indiana	Gary Bailey	Bultaco	Report
7	June 18	Tahoe Vista, California	Gary Jones	Yamaha	Report
8	June 25	Boise, Idaho	Gary Jones	Yamaha	Report
9	July 2	Olympia, Washington	Gunnar Lindstrom	Husqvarna	Report
10	July 8	Los Angeles Memorial Coliseum	Marty Tripes	Yamaha	Report
11	July 16	New Berlin, New York	Gary Jones	Yamaha	Report
12	July 23	Elkhorn, Wisconsin	Jimmy Weinert	Yamaha	Report
13	July 30	Mid-Ohio	Gary Jones	Yamaha	Report
14	September 2	Alabama International Motor Speedway	Gary Bailey	Bultaco	Report

== Final standings ==
=== 500cc ===
Pos	Rider	Machine	1	2	3	4	5	6	7	8	9	10	11	12	13	14	15	16	17	18	Pts
1	Brad Lackey	ČZ			1	1	1		1												2030
1	Brad Lackey	Kawasaki								1		1		1	1	1	1	1	1	2	2030
2	Gary Jones	Yamaha			8	12					9	2	8	5	3	2	3	7	3	3	829
3	Wyman Priddy	ČZ	3	2				1		2	2	4	7						11		750
4	Rich Thorwaldson	Suzuki				7	19		4		14	3	2		11	6		3	6	7	726
5	Jim Pomeroy	Bultaco			16				13		3	13	3	3	5	5	10	2	12	4	665
6	Bryan Kenney	Maico									1		4	6	4	3	9	8	7	8	582
7	Jimmy Weinert	Yamaha									4	10	1	2	6	14	2				542
8	Mike Runyard	ČZ									6	17	5	4	12	4	8	4	5	5	513
9	Gary Chaplin	Maico				6	7		2	3	11	15	12	15				5	4	10	496
10	Mark Blackwell	Husqvarna									7	6	9	7	2	9	5	6	8	6	480
-	Barry Higgins	ČZ	1	1				2			20			9						12	-
-	Jim Cooke	Kawasaki			3	2	3			10	16	7	14	16	7						-
-	Robert Brown	ČZ				9			3		8	11	15			7	6	9	9	11	-
-	Marty Tripes	Yamaha									18	14	16	10					2		-
-	Marty Tripes	ČZ																		1	-
-	Gary Semics	Husqvarna	2	3				10													-
-	Rob Norgaard	ČZ			2	13	16		9												-
-	Jim Wilson	ČZ			5	3	6									13					-
-	John DeSoto	Kawasaki				5	2		20	19	12	20	17								-
-	James Jerles	Suzuki		4				3													-
-	Eric Nelson	Maico	6	7				4													-
Sources only document the points awarded to the first ten competitors. Source:

=== 250cc ===
Pos	Rider	Machine	1	2	3	4	5	6	7	8	9	10	11	12	13	14	Pts
1	Gary Jones	Yamaha					1		1	1	18	2	1	2	1		995
2	Jimmy Weinert	Yamaha			3	15			2	6	9	3	2	1	2	10	781
3	Gunnar Lindstrom	Husqvarna	2		1	2	15	14	10	4	1	14	6	5	13		775
4	Peter Lamppu	Montesa			2	18	7		12	2	4	19	7	10	5		430
5	Bob Grossi	Husqvarna			16				13	9	2	5	3	4	6		430
6	Mike Runyard	Montesa			9	4	2			20	10	15		3	4		428
7	Bill Cook	Maico			8	3			5	3		20	10	6	9		376
8	Robert Harris	Bultaco	7	2				4		13	3	17	20		11	11	373
9	Sonny DeFeo	ČZ	1	1						18	14						310
10	Tony Wynn	ČZ	3	3				2			7	6	17				480
-	James Wicks	ČZ			4	7	4										-
-	James Wicks	Husqvarna								15	13	16		14			-
-	Gary Semics	Husqvarna								8	6		11	7	7	3	-
-	Brad Lackey	Kawasaki								5	15	7	12	8	10		-
-	Jim Pomeroy	Bultaco				1	16			10	12	12	9	20	18		-
-	Rich Eierstedt	Maico				8	3		4		8	10	15				-
-	Rex Staten	ČZ				9	8		3			4					-
-	Douglas Sanger	Maico	5	10				11					5	9	8		-
-	John DeSoto	Kawasaki								17	5	18	17	15	20		-
-	Gary Bailey	Bultaco						1								1	-
-	Marty Tripes	Yamaha									17	1	19		3		-
-	Robert Thompson	Ossa	18										4		16		-
-	Robert Thompson	Husqvarna						5									-
-	Ricky Jordan	ČZ	14													2	-
-	John Borg	Suzuki						3									-
Sources only document the points awarded to the first ten competitors. Source:

== See also ==
- 1972 Trans-AMA motocross series
