= 1972 Trans-AMA motocross series =

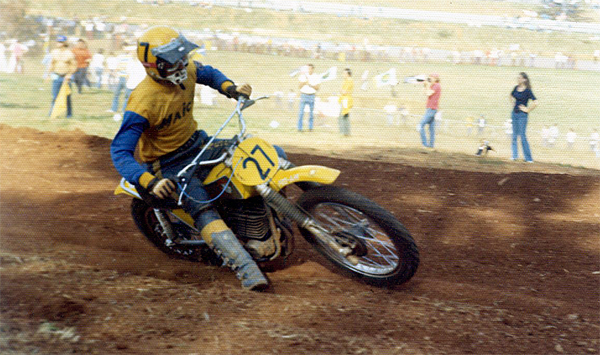
Ake Jonsson during Round 3 of the 1972 Trans-AMA in St. Peters, Missouri.

The 1972 Trans-AMA motocross series was the third annual international series established by the American Motorcyclist Association as a pilot event to help establish motocross in the United States. The motocross series was an invitational based on a 500cc engine displacement formula, run on American tracks featuring the top riders from the F.I.M. world championship against the top American riders.

Swedish Maico factory rider Åke Jonsson dominated the championship, winning nine consecutive overall wins. 500cc world champion, Roger De Coster and Heikki Mikkola placed second and third overall, claiming one victory apiece to start off the series before Jonsson began his winning streak. Brad Lackey was the highest-placing American rider, finishing the series sixth overall.

== 1972 Trans-AMA rounds ==
Round	Date	Location	Overall Winner	Top American
1	24 September	Copetown, Ontario	(Belgium) Roger De Coster	Brad Lackey
2	1 October	Honda Hills, Linnville, Ohio	(Finland) Heikki Mikkola	Bryan Kenney
3	8 October	Mid-American Motocross, St. Peters, Missouri	(Sweden) Åke Jonsson	Brad Lackey
4	15 October	Road Atlanta, Atlanta, Georgia	(Sweden) Åke Jonsson	Jimmy Weinert
5	22 October	Orlando Sports Stadium, Orlando, Florida	(Sweden) Åke Jonsson	Brad Lackey
6	29 October	Rio Bravo MX Park, Houston, Texas	(Sweden) Åke Jonsson	Brad Lackey
7	5 November	Carlsbad Raceway, Carlsbad, CA	(Sweden) Åke Jonsson	Brad Lackey
8	12 November	Arizona Cycle Park, Phoenix, Arizona	(Sweden) Åke Jonsson	Brad Lackey
9	19 November	Puyallup Raceway Park, Puyallup, Washington	(Sweden) Åke Jonsson	Brad Lackey
10	26 November	Carnegie Cycle Park, Livermore, California	(Sweden) Åke Jonsson	Brad Lackey
11	3 December	Saddleback Park, Irvine, California	(Sweden) Åke Jonsson	Marty Tripes

== 1972 Trans-AMA final standings ==
Pos	Rider	Machine	1	2	3	4	5	6	7	8	9	10	11	Pts
1	(Sweden) Åke Jonsson	Maico	2	4	1	1	1	1	1	1	1	1	1	1550
2	(Belgium) Roger De Coster	Suzuki	1	3		2			2	3	3	2	4	912
3	(Finland) Heikki Mikkola	Husqvarna	3	1	2		2	3	3	2				811
4	(West Germany) Hans Maisch	Maico		2	3		8		4	8	5		3	530
5	(Sweden) Arne Kring	Husqvarna			4	7	3	4		5	2			487
6	(United States) Brad Lackey	Kawasaki	4	10	6	9	6	8	6	7	8	4	9	460
7	(Sweden) Bengt Åberg	Husqvarna					5				4	7	2	304
8	(Netherlands) Pierre Karsmakers	Husqvarna			5	10	4	5	7	10			10	303
9	(Sweden) Christer Hammargren	Yamaha						2	9	6	7		8	264
10	(Czech Republic) Miroslav Halm	ČZ							5		9	3	7	228
-	(Belgium) Jaak van Velthoven	Yamaha						6	8	4		6		-
-	(France) Serge Bacou	Bultaco	7	5			9	7						-
-	(United States) Gary Jones	Yamaha		15	7	12	12	11	10	12	15	9	11	-
-	(United States) Mike Runyard	Suzuki	5	12	23	8	11	20	12	17	12	12	13	-
-	(United States) Rich Thorwaldson	Suzuki	8	20	8	4	19	19	14	16	11	13	15	-
-	(United States) Jim Pomeroy	Bultaco		9	19	5	10	13	13	19	10	18	12	-
-	(United States) Bryan Kenney	Maico		6	25	6	13	12	11	18	16	14	16	-
-	(United States) Mark Blackwell	Husqvarna		13	12	13	14	10	17	14	14	15	14	-
-	(United States) Jimmy Weinert	Yamaha		11	16	3	7	14	22	11				-
-	(United States) Gary Chaplin	Maico	6	17	21	16	20				13	11	18	-
-	(United States) Billy Clements	Husqvarna	9	16	14	14	23		16	13				-
-	(United Kingdom) Andy Roberton	Husqvarna								9	6		5	-
-	(United States) Wyman Priddy	ČZ		8	10	11						17		-
-	(United States) Marty Tripes	Yamaha		24	20	20	16					8		-
-	(United States) Marty Tripes	ČZ											6	-
-	(Czech Republic) Jiří Churavý	ČZ						9				5		-
-	(United Kingdom) Dave Bickers	ČZ		7	9									-
-	(Finland) Seppo Makinen	Husqvarna	10											-
-	(Japan) Masaharu Takezawa	Kawasaki										10		-
Sources only document the points awarded to the first ten competitors. Sources:

== See also ==
- 1972 AMA Motocross National Championship season
- 1972 FIM Motocross World Championship
- List of Trans-AMA motocross champions
