= 1972 German Formula Three Championship =

Seasons
- ← 1971 1973 →

The 1972 German Formula Three Championship (German: 1972 ADAC Preis der Formel 3) was a multi-event motor racing championship for single-seat open wheel formula racing cars held across Europe. The championship featured drivers competing in two-litre Formula Three racing cars which conformed to the technical regulations, or formula, for the championship. It commenced on 2 April at Nürburgring and ended at Zolder on 17 September after eight rounds.

Willi Sommer became a champion. He won three races. Manfred Mohr finished as runner-up, winning the season opener and the season finale. Dieter Kern completed the top-three in the drivers' standings with wins at Nürburgring and Hockenheimring. Jochen Mass was the only other driver who was able to win a race in the season.

== Calendar ==
Round	Location	Circuit	Date	Supporting
1	Nürburg, West Germany	Nürburgring	2 April	VII. ADAC-300-km-Rennen um den "Good Year-Pokal"
2	Nürburg, West Germany	Nürburgring	27 May	XVII. ADAC 1000 km Rennen
3	Salzburg, Austria	Salzburgring	2 July	ADAC-Bavaria-Rennen
4	Hockenheim, West Germany	Hockenheimring	16 July	ADAC Südwest-Pokal-Rennen "ADAC-Solitude-Rennen"
5	Freiburg im Breisgau, West Germany	Freiburg im Breisgau	6 August	32. ADAC-Bergpreis Freiburg-Schauinsland
6	Nürburg, West Germany	Nürburgring	13 August	ADAC Rhein-Mosel-Preis "Mayener ADAC-Rundstreckenrennen"
7	Kassel-Calden, West Germany	Kassel-Calden Circuit	20 August	ADAC-Hessen-Preis
8	Zolder, Belgium	Circuit Zolder	17 September	ADAC-Redlefsen-Super-Sprint

== Championship standings ==
- Points are awarded as follows:

1	2	3	4	5	6	7	8	9	10
20	15	12	10	8	6	4	3	2	1

Pos	Driver	NÜR1 (West Germany)	NÜR2 (West Germany)	SAL (Austria)	HOC (West Germany)	FRE (West Germany)	NÜR2 (West Germany)	KAS (West Germany)	ZOL (Belgium)	Points
1	(West Germany) Willi Sommer		3	1	3	1	3	1	10	96
2	(West Germany) Manfred Mohr	1	2	3		2	5	3	1	94
3	(West Germany) Dieter Kern		1		1	3	2		3	79
4	(West Germany) Rudolf Dötsch	4	6		9	4	4	5	2	59
5	(West Germany) Willi Deutsch	3	5	6	5		7	2	4	59
6	(West Germany) Werner Schommers		4	2	2					40
7	(West Germany) Wolfgang Bülow	5			4	6		4		34
8	(West Germany) Ernst Maring	6				5			5	22
9	(West Germany) Jochen Mass	9					1			22
10	(West Germany) Rudi Schmidt	8	8	5	8		9			19
11	(West Germany) Bernhard Brack			7	6		6	8		19
12	(West Germany) Günter Kölmel		7	4			8	10		18
13	(West Germany) Paul Fischer				7			6	6	16
14	(West Germany) Hannelore Werner	2								15
15	(West Germany) Philipp Gantner			10		7			8	8
16	(West Germany) Josef Kremer			9					7	6
17	(West Germany) Hans Deffland	7			10					5
18	(West Germany) Erwin Derichs							7		4
19	(West Germany) Maximilian Plass	10				9				3
20	(West Germany) Felix Martin			8						3
21	(West Germany) Gerhard Greiner					8				3
22	(West Germany) Bernd Rack								9	2
23	(West Germany) Carlo Breidenstein		9							2
24	(West Germany) Thomas Betzler							9		2
25	(Austria) Harald Ertl		10							1
26	(West Germany) Bruno Burg					10				1
27	(West Germany) Jorg Obermoser						10			1
Pos	Driver	NÜR1 (West Germany)	NÜR2 (West Germany)	SAL (Austria)	HOC (West Germany)	FRE (West Germany)	NÜR3 (West Germany)	KAS (West Germany)	ZOL (Belgium)	Points (West Germany)

Colour	Result
Gold	Winner
Silver	Second place
Bronze	Third place
Green	Points classification
Blue	Non-points classification
Blue	Non-classified finish (NC)
Purple	Retired, not classified (Ret)
Red	Did not qualify (DNQ)
Red	Did not pre-qualify (DNPQ)
Black	Disqualified (DSQ)
White	Did not start (DNS)
White	Withdrew (WD)
White	Race cancelled (C)
Blank	Did not practice (DNP)
Blank	Did not arrive (DNA)
Blank	Excluded (EX)

**Bold** – Pole
Italics – Fastest Lap
