= Selex Competition =

- Type: Private
- Industry: Automotive
- Founded: 1960; 66 years ago
- Founder: Miquel Molons Ximenos
- Headquarters: Les Franqueses del Vallès, Spain

Selex Competition was a Spanish constructor of racing cars under various brands. The company currently produces dampers and shocks.

== History ==
=== 1960s ===
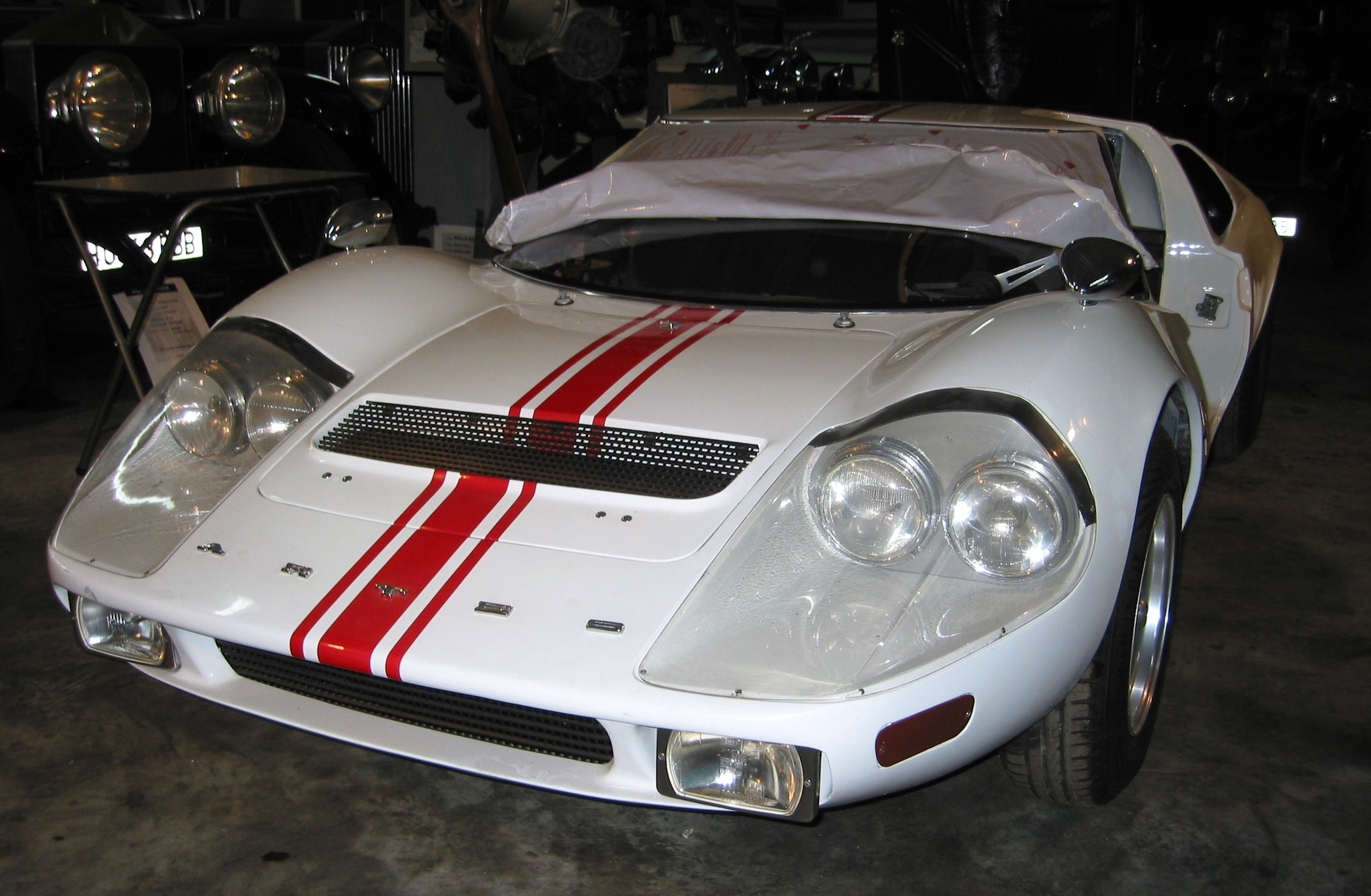
Artés Selex Campeador at Salón Auto Retro 2007, Barcelona

Miquel Molons Ximenos built up experience in building all types of dampers in the nineteen fifties. Molons built his first car in 1958. When karting made its way to Europe, Molons embraced the new sport. A kart racing team was founded. The team raced in various Catalan championships until its dissolution in 1965. Selex was founded by Miquel in 1960 as an engineering workshop. In 1965 the first car was constructed. The Selex ST 1 was a prototype built according to Spanish Formula 4 regulations of that time. The car had a spaceframe chassis and was fitted with a Ducati 175 Sport engine which produced 28hp. Molons completed various test runs at a kart circuit near Pedralbes. After the prototype José Artés de Arcos S.A proposed funding to build another Formula 4 car, the Artes Cheetah. This car featured a monocoque chassis and was built to fit engines from all domestic engine producers. These were at the time Ducati, Ossa, Bultaco and Montesa. One special Cheetah was fitted with a Honda engine and given to Prince Rainier of Monaco. The Cheetah's built according to Formula 3 specifications were fitted with 1000cc SEAT 850 engines. In 1967 a Cheetah fitted with a Cosworth engine was tested by Jorge de Bagration. The car was intended to compete at the XI Coupe Internationale de Vitesse des Formule 3 at Reims-Gueux but the car did not made the start. At the Barcelona Motor Show Selex and Artés de Arcos unveiled the Artes Campeador. The monocoque chassis was built by Selex at their workshop located at the Carrer de Cosega in Barcelona. The fiberglass body was constructed by Zipo, a company led by Francisco Guitart. The final assembly was at the Arcos de Artes plant. The car was originally fitted with a 1500cc SEAT engine but this was replaced by a Gordini engine. A fire at the Zipo workshop destroyed all molds for the bodywork. This prevented any more Campeadors from being built. Jaume Xifré designed a new Formula 3 car the following year. The ST 2 was fitted with a Renault engine to compete in Formula 3. The car was tested by Forcano Xavier and Ernesto García at the Jarama Circuit. The car was intended to race at the VII Trofeo Juan Jover in Barcelona but the Renault engine did not get through customs. Selex sold the chassis to Antonio Madueño who intended it to race in domestic series. Madueño commissioned Selex to build another sports car, the Cordobán. The Cordobán was based on the SEAT 124.

=== 1970s ===
A new Selex ST 2 was fitted with a Novamotor Formula 3 engine. The car was tested at Nogaro by Swiss driver Jurg Dubler. Salvador Cañellas debuted the car at the Coupe de Printemps, the first round of the French Formula 3. Canellas was one of six drivers not to qualify for the race. This performance was repeated during round 2, the VII Coupe de Vitesse 1970 at Pau. At Montjuïc Park the Selex qualified for its first race. However an engine failure prevented the Selex to complete a lap. Selex retreated for a short period from Formula 3. This decision came after Cañellas decided to focus on his motorcycle racing career and SEAT launching the Formula 1430. Xifré designed the ST 3 to race in the new Formula 1430. Over half the field raced Selex cars. The championship was won by Paco Josa piloting a Selex ST 3. From 1972 to 1976 the Selex ST 3 and its evolutions won all the races in the Formula 1430. After the success of Formula 1430 SEAT launched the Formula 1800 in 1974. Javier Juncadella won the inaugural championship in a Selex in fierce competition with Martini. The following year the Selex ST 4 competed in the Eurocup Formula Renault with José Luis Ferrer but with no notable results. Martini beat Selex to the title in the 1975 and 1976 Formula 1800 championship with Juan Villacieros. After this season the Formula 1800 folded. Selex got a request by Van Hool to build a Formula 2 car in 1974. The car was manufactured at the Van Hool plant in Zaragoza. The cars designer, Jaume Xifré, tested the car at Circuit Zolder in 1975. The Van Hool Formula 2 car was Xifré last project for Selex as he left the company in 1975. Francisco Guitart was his successor and he introduced a new Formula 1430 car in 1975, the ST 5. The new car was regularly beaten by the old ST 3 chassis. A new Formula 3 car was introduced in 1978. Miguel Molons Jr. intended to race the ST 7 in the European Formula 3. But a lack of funding prevented him making his debut. The car was converted into a Formula 1430 car. Manuel Valls won the championship in the ST 7 in 1979.

=== 1980s ===
With a lack of interest by SEAT in the Formula 1430 the continuity of the series was in jeopardy. Selex decided not to build any more Formula 1430 cars. Molons gave new life to the dampers business. Enrique Llobell won the Formula 1430 title in the ST 7 in 1980. The following year the title was won by Jose Luis Llobell, brother of Enrique, in the same car. The Formula 1430 folded in 1985. Ford asked Molons to design the cars for the new Formula Fiesta. Molons declined and the contract went to Juncosa. In 1981 Manuel Valls came to Selex to design a new Formula 3 car. The Toyota powered car was initially names the ST 9 and was later renamed the Avidesa. Avidesa was the main sponsor of the car. Manuel Valls debuted the car at Jarama in 1982. After being fasted in practice the car broke down and he could not start the race. Adrian Campos, owner of Avidesa, and Jose-Luis Lobelli raced the car in 1983. Campos achieved the cars best result, at Jarama he achieved a seventh place.

=== Recent history ===
After constructing racing cars Selex returned to constructing dampers and shocks which they still produce today. In 1998 Selex left their workshop in Barcelona and moved to Les Franqueses del Vallès.

== Cars ==
Year	Model	Racing series	Nr. built	Designer	Note
1965	Selex ST 1	Formula 4	1	Miquel Molons	
1966	Artes Guepardo	Formula 4	19	Jaume Xifré	
1966	Artes Guepardo	Formula 3	19	Jaume Xifré	
1966	Artes Guepardo	Formula Libre	19	Jaume Xifré	
1967	Artes Campeador	Grand Tourer	1	Jaume Xifré	Built for Artés de Arcos
1968	Selex ST 2	Formula 3	3	Jaume Xifré	
1969	Autotecnica Cordobán	Grand Tourer	3	Jaume Xifré	Built for Antonio Madueño
1970	Selex ST 3	Formula 1430	45	Jaume Xifré	
1973	Selex ST 4	Formula 1800	26	Jaume Xifré	
1973	Selex ST 4	Eurocup Formula Renault	26	Jaume Xifré	
1974	Van Hool VHM-1	Formula 2	2	Jaume Xifré	Built for Van Hool
1975	Selex ST 5	Formula 1430	25	Francisco Guitart	
1977	Selex ST 6	Formula 1430	1	Francisco Guitart	
1978	Selex ST 7	Formula 1430	1	Francisco Guitart	
1978	Selex ST 7	Formula 3	1	Francisco Guitart	
1978	Selex ST 8	Formula 1430	1	Francisco Guitart	
1981	Selex Avidesa	Formula 3	3	Francisco Guitart	
