= Ford Puma =

Automotive nameplate by Ford Motor Company

The Ford Puma is a nameplate used by Ford Motor Company for several car models. The "Puma" name is also used on variants of the Duratorq engine.

- Ford Puma (coupé), a 1997–2001 compact coupé
- Ford Puma (crossover), a 2019–present subcompact crossover SUV
  - Ford Puma Rally1, a 2022 Rally1 car built by the M-Sport Ford World Rally Team
  - Ford Puma Gen-E, a 2024–present electric version of the subcompact crossover SUV
- Ford Duratorq ZSD "Puma", a line of 2.0-litre, 2.2-litre, and 2.4-litre engines
- Ford Escort RS2000, originally intended to be called the Puma
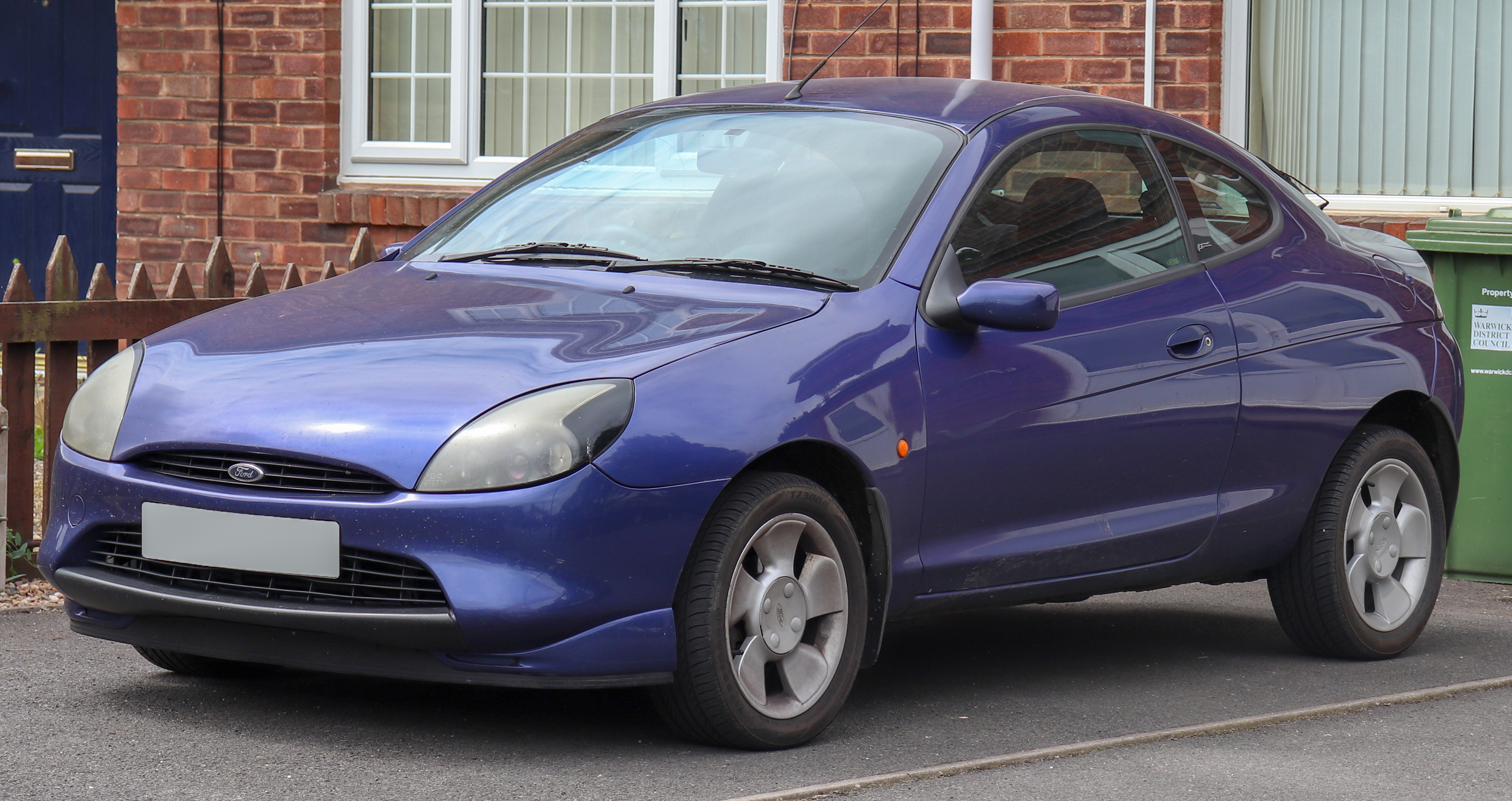
1997–2002 Ford Puma coupé

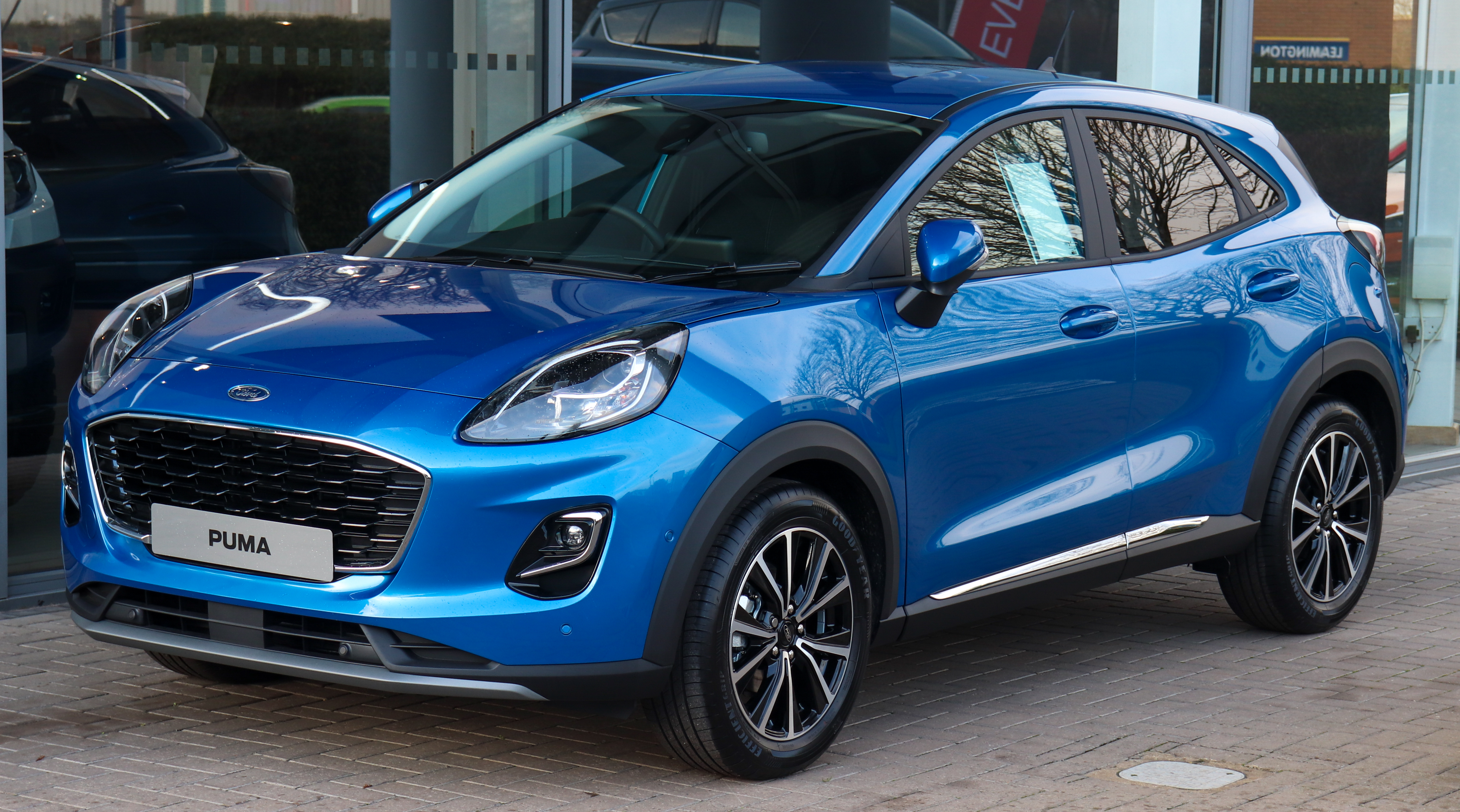
2019–present Ford Puma crossover
