= Formula 1430 =

Junior formula racing series in Spain

- Category: Single seaters
- Country: Spain
- Inaugural season: 1971
- Folded: 1985
- Engine suppliers: SEAT

The Formula 1430 was founded in 1971 as the Formula Nacional. It was a junior formula racing series based in Spain.

== History ==
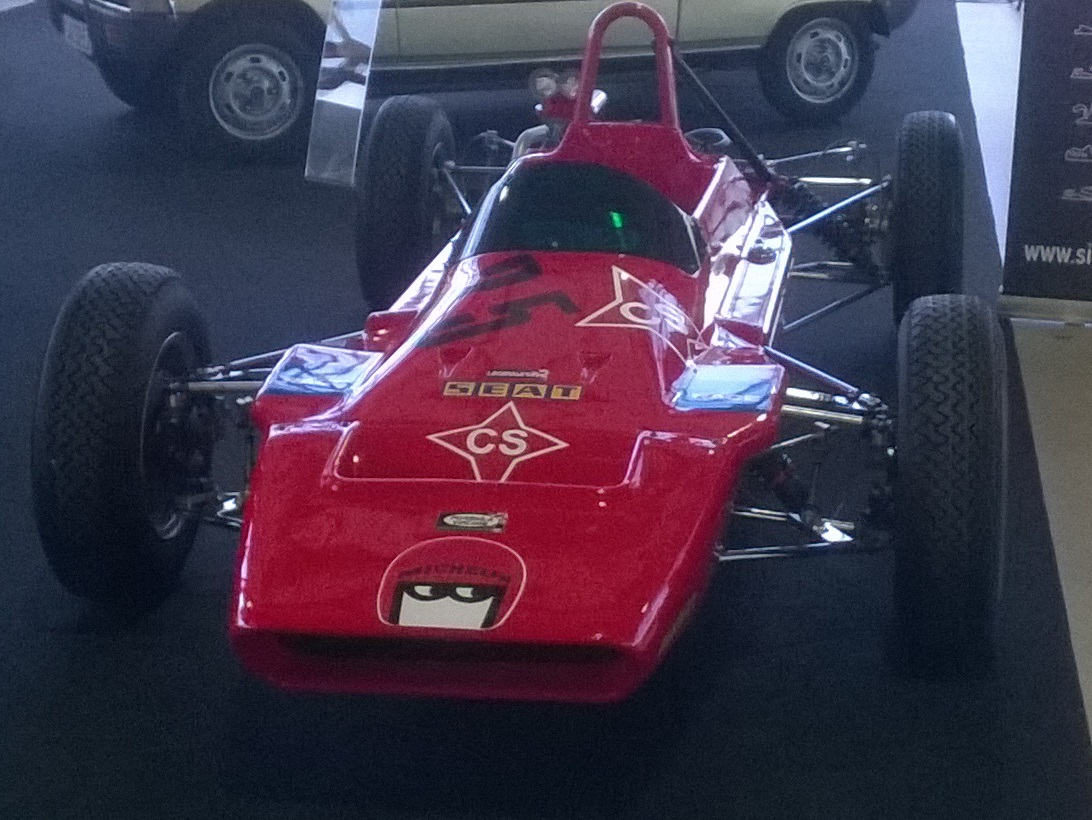

Spanish car manufacturer SEAT launched the Formula Nacional in 1971. In the same era the Formula Ford (Great Britain), Formula Blue (France), Formula Vee (Germany) and Formula 850 (Italy) were launched. Many notable Spanish racing car constructors committed to the new founded series. Hispakart, Selex and Lynx are a few manufacturers to commit to the series. The first race of the series was run on April 4, 1971, at Circuito del Jarama. After a lengthy battle Selex driver Paco Josa won the championship over Lynx driver Emilio Zapico. The following years were dominated by the Selex ST 3. The ST 3 won all races between 1972 and 1976. The ST 7, launched in 1978, was less successful. Selex lost its dominance with the introduction of this new car. The ST 7 would win two championships 1980 and 1981. In 1980 the championship was won by Enrique Llobell. The following year the championship was won by Enriques brother Jose Luis Llobell. As of 1982 foreign built cars were allowed in the series. Selex completely pulled out of the championship due to disappointing results. With SEAT slowly pulling out of the series, the championship lost its notability and folded after the 1984 season.

== Car ==
Manufacturers
Cordobán
Etco
Hispakart
Javier
Lynx
Macoi
I-Pre.
Ro-An
Selex

The Formula 1430 is an open chassis formula. Every manufacturer based in Spain is allowed to design and build a Formula 1430 car. The only engine allowed is the SEAT 1430 engine. The engines performance is raised to 75hp. The cars use a gearbox coming out of a SEAT 600 or SEAT 850. Constructors were allowed to build a monocoque or a spaceframe chassis. Aerodynamic aids like a diffuser and wings were not allowed. Domestic produced Firestone Torino tyres were the spec tyres for the series. The car had a minimum weight of approximately 420kg.

SEAT FD
Engine type	inline 4-cylinder
Displacement	1430cc
Bore	80mm
Stroke	71.50mm
Horsepower	75

== Champions ==
Year	Driver	Car
1971	(Spain) Paco Josa	Selex ST 3
1972	(Spain) Salvador Cañellas	Selex ST 3
1973	(Spain) Juan Villacieros	Selex ST 3
1974	(Spain) Federico van der Hoeven	Selex ST 3
1975	(Spain) Luis Canomanuel	Selex ST 3
1976	(Spain) Pere Nogues	Selex ST 3
1977	(Spain) Miquel Molons	???
1978	(Spain) Juan Alonso de Celada	???
1979	(Spain) Manuel Valls i Biesca	???
1980	(Spain) Enrique Llobell	Selex ST 7
1981	(Spain) Jose Luis Llobell	Selex ST 7
1982	(Spain) Ramón Rodríguez	???
1983	(France) Alain Poli	???
1984	(Spain) Antonio Cutillas	???

== Other notable drivers ==
- (Argentina) Carlos Alberto Jarque
- (Spain) Carlos Pérez-Sala (brother of Luis Pérez-Sala)
- (Spain) Fermín Vélez
- (Spain) Emilio Zapico
