= Linnville, Ohio =

Unincorporated community in Ohio, U.S.

Coordinates: 39°57′19″N 82°20′31″W

Linnville is an unincorporated community in Licking County, in the U.S. state of Ohio.

== History ==
Linnville had its start when the National Road was extended to that point. The community was laid out in 1829. Linnville was named after Adam Linn, a pioneer merchant. A post office was established at Linnville in 1833, and remained in operation until 1903.
