= Salvador Cañellas =

Spanish motorcycle racer and rally driver (born 1944)

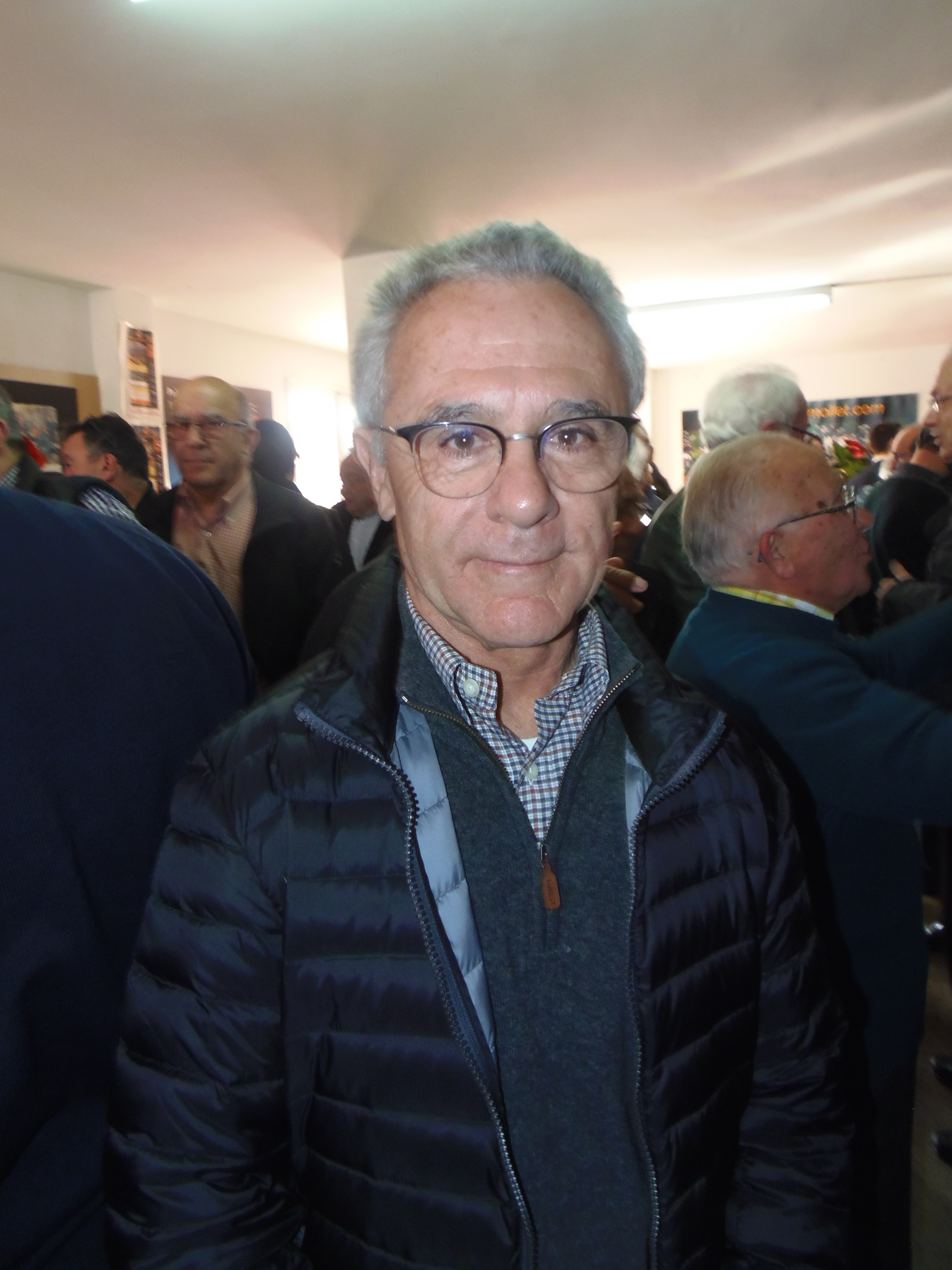
- Cañellas at the Museu Isern de la Moto in Mollet del Vallès, during the Homage to Paco Tombas
- Nationality: Spanish
- Born: 1 December 1944 (age 81)
Motorcycle racing career statistics
Grand Prix motorcycle racing
Active years	1968 - 1970
First race	1968 125cc Spanish Grand Prix
Last race	1970 50cc Spanish Grand Prix
First win	1968 125cc Spanish Grand Prix
Last win	1970 50cc Spanish Grand Prix
Team	Bultaco
Championships	0
Starts / Wins / Podiums / Poles / F. laps / Points; 11 / 2 / 5 / 0 / 0 / 74

Salvador Cañellas Gual (born 1 December 1944) is a former Grand Prix motorcycle road racer and rally driver from Spain.

Born in Santa Oliva, Catalonia, Spain, Cañellas had his best year in 1970 when he finished fourth in the 50cc world championship. He became the first Spanish rider to win a Grand Prix when he won the 1968 125cc Spanish Grand Prix. Cañellas won two motorcycle Grand Prix races during his career. He teamed up with Benjamin Grau on a Ducati to win the 1975 Montjuic 24-hour endurance race. He later switched successfully to auto racing (Rallye, Touring Cars and even single seaters) and won the 1972 Spanish Rally Championship and the 1972 Formula 1430. During the 1978 World Rally Championship season, he finished third in the Rally Poland.
