= 1971 South Pacific Touring Series =

Australian motor racing competition for production touring cars

The 1971 South Pacific Touring Series was an Australian motor racing competition for Series Production Touring Cars. It was the second running of an annual series which had first been contested as the 1970 Tasman Touring Series.

The series was won by Colin Bond driving a Holden Torana GTR XU-1. The 1971 series also became the focus of a Holden commissioned documentary featuring the Holden Dealer Team and its drivers including Colin Bond.

== Schedule ==
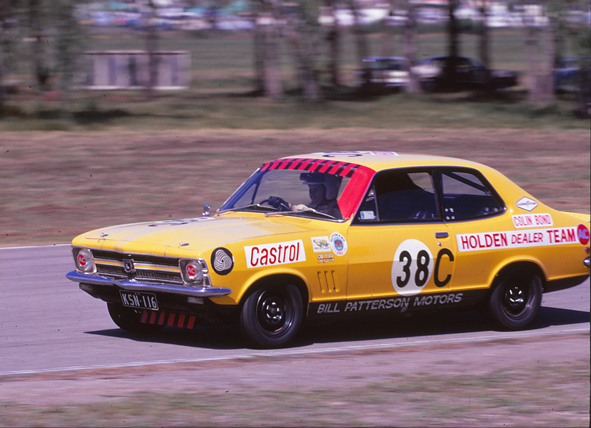
Colin Bond won the series driving a Holden Torana GTR XU-1 similar to that pictured above at Warwick Farm

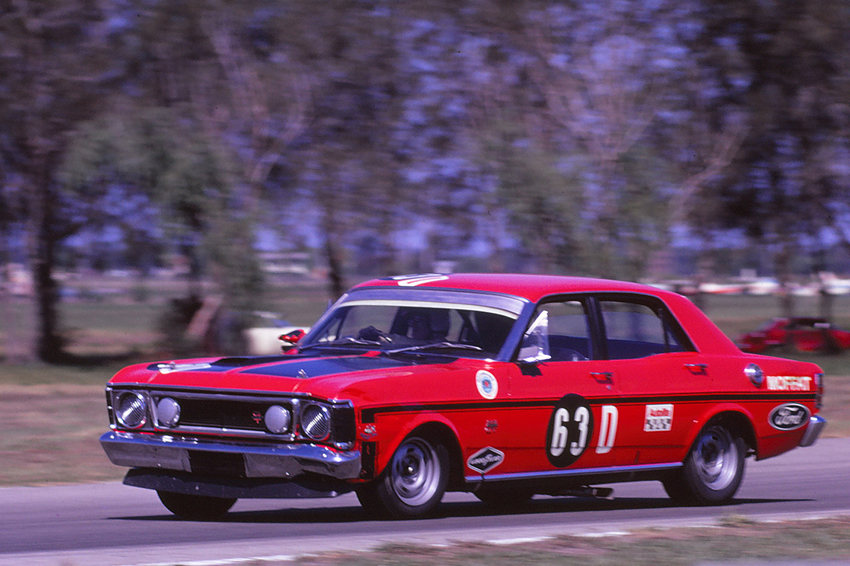
Bruce McPhee placed second driving a Ford Falcon GTHO similar to that pictured above

The series was contested over three rounds:

Round	Race name	Circuit	Date	Winning driver	Winning car
1		Warwick Farm	14 February	Colin Bond	Holden Torana GTR XU-1
2	International Motor Show Trophy	Sandown	21 February	Bruce McPhee	Ford Falcon GTHO
3		Surfers Paradise	28 February	Colin Bond	Holden Torana GTR XU-1

Each round was held as a support race to a round of the 1971 Tasman Championship.

The first round was scheduled to be held at Surfers Paradise on 7 February however that meeting was postponed due to heavy rain and it was rescheduled to 28 February.

== Classes ==
Competing cars were classified into five classes according to an assessed CP Units value for each vehicle. Under this system, the engine capacity of the car (in litres) was multiplied by the retail price of the car (in Australian dollars) to arrive at a CP Unit value.

- Class A: Up to 3000 CP Units
- Class B: 3001 to 6000 CP Units
- Class C: 6001 to 9000 CP Units
- Class D: 9001 to 18000 CP Units
- Class E: Over 18000 CP Units

== Points system ==
Points were awarded on a 4,3,2,1 basis for the first four places at each round. In addition, points were awarded for places in each class as follows:

- Where there were 5 or more starters - on a 9,6,4,3,2,1 basis
- Where there was 3, 4 or 5 starters - on a 6,4,2,1 basis
- Where there was less than 3 starters - no points were awarded

Points were only awarded to a driver who started in all three rounds. The driver was required to compete in a vehicle entered by the same entrant in all three rounds and that vehicle was required to be the same make and model although not necessarily the same vehicle.

== Series standings ==
Pos.	Driver	Car	Entrant	Points
1	Colin Bond	Holden Torana GTR XU-1	Holden Dealer Team	37
2	Bruce McPhee	Ford Falcon GTHO	Ford Australia	34
3	Lakis Manticas	Morris Cooper S	British Leyland Works Team	24

Only the first three outright series placings are shown in the above table.

=== Manufacturers Awards ===
A Manufacturers Award was presented to the manufacturer of the winning driver's car at the end of the series. In addition, awards were made to the manufacturers of the winning driver's car in each of the four remaining classes.
