= 1972 Australian Rally Championship =

Seasons
- ← 1971 1973 →

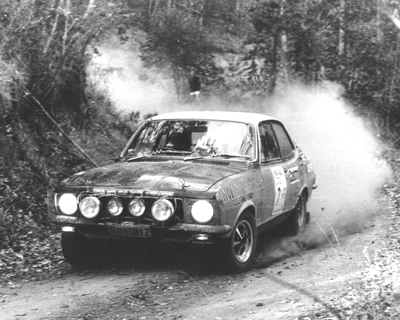
Bond and Shepheard in the Holden Dealer Team Torana GTR XU-1 on their way to another win in the Warana Rally, round four of the 1972 Australian Rally Championship

The 1972 Australian Rally Championship was a series of six rallying events held across Australia. It was the fifth season in the history of the competition.

Colin Bond and navigator George Shepheard won the Championship for the second year in a row in the Holden Dealer Team Torana GTR XU-1.

== Season review ==
After a late challenge to the HDT Toranas at the 1971 Southern Cross Rally, the works Mitsubishi Galants were expected to do well in the 1972 Australian Rally Championship and pose a major threat to Harry Firth's HDT domination of the series. However it was not to be, as the cars were poorly backed up and suffered from various incidents which cost them the chance of any outright wins. The HDT LJ Torana XU-1's won five of the six rounds, Mitsubishi's best finishes were a second place in the Alpine (for Doug Stewart and Dave Johnson) and thirds in the Warana (Doug Stewart and Dave Johnson) and Snowy Mountains rallies (Doug Chivas and Peter Meyer).

Another major challenge was expected from Renault. Their Renault R8 Gordinis had dominated the 1970 season and the new R12 Gordinis were faster and the team was hoping this would ensure some success for 1972. Tom Barr-Smith was second in the Walkerville 500, and Bob Watson managed a third in the Akademos, but other than that it was a disappointing season.

Colin Bond and George Shepheard dominated the championship, winning three rounds together and a fourth for Shepheard when he navigated for Frank Kilfoyle in the final round, The Alpine.

== The Rallies ==
The 1972 season featured six events, two each in New South Wales and Victoria; and one each for Queensland and South Australia.

Round	Rally	Date
1	Bunbury Curran (NSW)	16–17 April
2	Akademos Rally (VIC)	27–28 May
3	Snowy Mountains Rally (NSW)	10–12 June
4	Warana Rally (QLD)	23–24 September
5	Rothmans Walkerville 500 (SA)	28–29 October
6	Alpine Rally (VIC)	25–26 November

=== Round One – Bunbury Curran – 16–17 April 1972 ===
310 miles, 54 starters, 39 finishers

Position	Driver	Navigator	Car	Points
1	Colin Bond	George Shepheard	Holden Torana LJ GTR XU-1	25
2	Richard Harris	Graham Lockie	Mazda Capella RE	36
3	Doug Stewart	Dave Johnson	Mitsubishi Galant 1600	38
4	Stewart McLeod	Jack Lock	Holden Torana LJ GTR XU-1	43
5	Peter Lang	Ed O'Cleary	Datsun 1600	48
6	Paul Older	Brian McElhinney	BMW 2002	51
7	Brian West	Gary Hartnett	Mini Clubman GT	54
8	Grahame Elliott	Fred Gocentas	Datsun 1600	57
9	Brian Hilton	Barry Lake	Peugeot 504	59
10	Peter Robertson	Chris Jessup	Ford Escort Twin Cam	62

=== Round Two – Akademos Rally – 27–28 May 1972 ===
320 miles, 38 starters, 23 finishers

Position	Driver	Navigator	Car	Points
1	Frank Kilfoyle	Roger Bonhomme	Holden LJ Torana GTR XU-1	31
2	Colin Bond	George Shepheard	Holden LJ Torana GTR XU-1	32
3	Bob Watson	Geoff Thomas	Renault 12 Gordini	34
4	Barry Ferguson	Warwick Smith	Holden LJ Torana GTR XU-1	37
5	George Fury	Monty Suffern	Ford Cortina GT	38
6	Mike Fitzgerald	Geoff Schmidt	Peugeot 404	46
7	Peter Janson	Mike Mitchell	Holden LJ Torana GTR XU-1	66
8	John Dixon	Rex Muldoon	Ford Escort	74
9=	Mal McPherson	Jeff Beaumont	Renault 12 Gordini	75
9=	Evan Green	Roy Denny	Ford Escort Twin Cam	75

=== Round Three – Snowy Mountains Rally – 10–12 June 1972 ===
600 miles, 48 starters, 40 finishers

Position	Driver	Navigator	Car	Points
1	Colin Bond	George Shepheard	Holden Torana LJ GTR XU-1	58
2	Frank Kilfoyle	Roger Bonhomme	Holden Torana LJ GTR XU-1	60
3=	Stewart McLeod	Adrian Mortimer	Holden Torana LJ GTR XU-1	65
3=	Doug Chivas	Peter Meyer	Mitsubishi Galant 1600	65
5	Doug Stewart	Dave Johnson	Mitsubishi Galant 1600	70
6	Peter Lang	Ed O'Clery	Datsun 1600	71
7	Barry Ferguson	Warwick Smith	Holden Torana LJ GTR XU-1	88
8	Bruce Collier	Lindsay Adcock	Renault 12 Gordini	92
9	Mark Sheridan	Richard McMaster	Volvo 142S	96
10	Arthur Jackson	Peter Godden	Datsun 1600	97

=== Round Four – Warana Rally – 23–24 September 1972 ===
450 miles

Position	Driver	Navigator	Car	Points
1	Colin Bond	George Shepheard	Holden Torana LJ GTR XU-1	22
2	Frank Kilfoyle	Mike Osborne	Holden Torana LJ GTR XU-1	26
3	Doug Stewart	Dave Johnson	Mitsubishi Galant 1600	33
4	Bob Riley	Brian Gemmell	Mitsubishi Galant 1600	37
5	Mike Chapman	Alan Lawson	Holden HK V8	40
6	Stewart McLeod	Adrian Mortimer	Holden Torana LJ GTR XU-1	41
7	Ian Riedel	Ray Wood	Holden Monaro 350	45
8	Evan Green	Roy Denny	Ford Escort Twin Cam	50
9	Charlie Lund	Brian McCloy	Mazda RX-3	52
10	Doug Chivas	Peter Meyer	Mitsubishi Galant 1600	58

=== Round Five – Rothmans Walkerville 500 – 28–29 October 1972 ===
320 miles

Position	Driver	Navigator	Car	Points
1	John Taylor	Graham West	Austin Kimberley	20
2	Tom Barr-Smith	Rob Hunt	Renault 12 Gordini	26
3	Gary Chapman	Norm Vincent	Mazda RX-3	41
4	Tony Pennell	Jack Lock	Holden Torana LJ GTR XU-1	42
5	Keith Intveld	Ian Hese	Citroen	49
6	Chuck Mora	Colin Abbey	Renault 16TS	56

=== Round Six – Alpine Rally – 25–26 November 1972 ===
600 miles

Position	Driver	Navigator	Car	Points
1	Frank Kilfoyle	George Shepheard	Holden Torana LJ GTR XU-1	62
2	Doug Stewart	Dave Johnson	Mitsubishi Galant 1600	83
3	Peter Janson	Mike Prendergast	Holden Torana LJ GTR XU-1	85
4	Doug Chivas	Peter Meyer	Mitsubishi Galant 1600	100
5	Bob Riley	Adrian van Loon	Mitsubishi Galant 1600	103
6=	Helmut Goetz	Mike Mitchell	Datsun 1600 SSS	111
6=	Gil Davis	Peter Haas	Holden Torana LJ GTR XU-1	111
8	Sue Ransom	Christine Cole	Ford Escort Twin Cam	117
9	Len Shaw	Jim McAuliffe	Holden Torana LJ GTR XU-1	124
10	Warwick Smith	Tony Walsham	Renault Dauphine	153

== 1972 Drivers and Navigators Championships ==
Final pointscore for 1972 is as follows.

=== Colin Bond – Champion Driver 1972 ===
Position	Driver	Car	Points
1	Colin Bond	Holden Torana LJ GTR XU-1	33
2	Frank Kilfoyle	Holden Torana LJ GTR XU-1	30
3	Doug Stewart	Mitsubishi Galant 1600	16
4	John Taylor	Holden Torana LJ GTR XU-1	9
5	Stewart McLeod	Holden Torana LJ GTR XU-1	8
6	Doug Chivas	Mitsubishi Galant 1600	7

=== George Shepheard – Champion Navigator 1972 ===
Position	Navigator	Car	Points
1	George Shepheard	Holden Torana LJ GTR XU-1	42
2	Dave Johnson	Mitsubishi Galant 1600	16
3	Roger Bonhomme	Mitsubishi Galant 1600	15
4	Graham West	Austin Kimberley	9
5	Peter Meyer	Mitsubishi Galant 1600	7
6=	Rob Hunt	Renault 12 Gordini	6
6=	Jack Lock	Holden Torana LJ GTR XU-1	6
6=	Graham Lockie	Mazda Capella	6
6=	Mike Mitchell	Mitsubishi Galant 1600	6
6=	Mike Osborne	Holden Torana LJ GTR XU-1	6
