= 1974 Australian Rally Championship =

Seasons
- ← 1973 1975 →

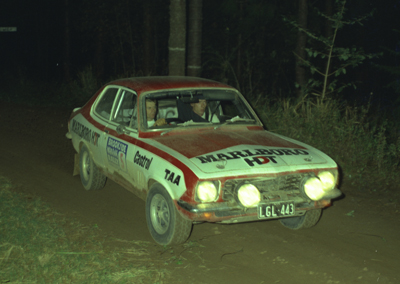
1974 ARC winners Colin Bond and George Shepheard in the HDT Holden Torana GTR XU-1.

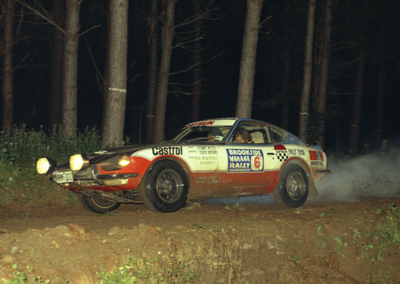
Stewart McLeod and Adrian Mortimer led the challenge from the Datsun 240Z's to take second place in the championship.

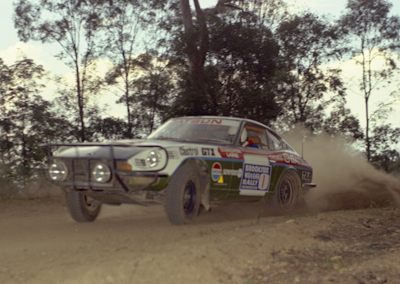
Third place went to West Australians Ross Dunkerton and John Large in the Datsun 240Z.

The 1974 Australian Rally Championship was a series of seven rallying events held across Australia. It was the seventh season in the history of the competition.

Colin Bond and navigator George Shepheard in the Holden Dealer Team Holden Torana GTR XU-1 were the winners of the 1974 Championship.

== Season review ==
The seventh Australian Rally Championship was expanded to seven events now venturing to the West with the first ever round to be staged in Western Australia. This season consisted of two events in Victoria and one each in Queensland, New South Wales, South Australia and Western Australia. 1974 was to be the last year of domination from the Holden Torana GTR XU-1's. Bond and Shepheard had four wins and a second to win the championship, but had increasing opposition from the Datsun 240Z's of Stewart McLeod/Adrian Mortimer and Ross Dunkerton/John Large.

== The Rallies ==
The seven events of the 1974 season were as follows.

Round	Rally	Date
1	Semperit 1600 Rally (WA)	
2	Akademos Rally (VIC)	
3	Bega Valley Rally (NSW)	
4	Uniroyal Southern Rally (SA)	
5	Warana Rally (QLD)	
6	Bunbury-Curran Rally (NSW)	
7	Alpine Rally (VIC)	

=== Round One – Semperit 1600 ===
Position	Driver	Navigator	Car	Points
1	Peter Lang	George Shepheard	Torana GTR XU-1	47
2	Stewart McLeod	Adrian Mortimer	Datsun 240Z	48
3	Bob Watson	R van der Straaten	Renault 16TS	54
4	Bob Riley	Tom Snooks	Mitsubishi Galant	57
5	Ross Dunkerton	John Large	Datsun 240Z	66
6	Dean Rainsford	Graham West	Porsche 911S	69

=== Round Two – Akademos Rally ===
Position	Driver	Navigator	Car	Points
1	Colin Bond	George Shepheard	Torana GTR XU-1	32
2	Ross Dunkerton	John Large	Datsun 240Z	46
3	Stewart McLeod	Adrian Mortimer	Datsun 240Z	47
4	Dean Rainsford	Graham West	Porsche 911S	59
5	Bill Evans	Mike Mitchell	Datsun 120Y	61
6	D Sutton	R van der Straaten	Torana GTR XU-1	65

=== Round Three – Bega Valley Rally ===
Position	Driver	Navigator	Car	Points
1	Stewart McLeod	Adrian Mortimer	Datsun 240Z	55
2	Peter Lang	Fred Gocentas	Torana GTR XU-1	56
3	Ross Dunkerton	John Large	Datsun 240Z	63
4	Bill Evans	Mike Mitchell	Datsun 120Y	85
5	Bruce Cheesman	Graham Lockie	Datsun 1600	110
6	Colin Bond	George Shepheard	Torana GTR XU-1	116

=== Round Four – Uniroyal Southern Rally (Walkerville) ===
Position	Driver	Navigator	Car	Points
1	Colin Bond	George Shepheard	Torana GTR XU-1	5.25
2	Dean Rainsford	Graham West	Porsche 911S	7.25
3	Ross Dunkerton	John Large	Datsun 240Z	9.5
4	Bob Riley	Brian Hope	Mitsubishi Galant	9.75
5	Bill Evans	Mike Mitchell	Datsun 120Y	11.75
6	Stewart McLeod	Adrian Mortimer	Datsun 240Z	12.5

=== Round Five – Warana Rally ===
Position	Driver	Navigator	Car	Points
1	Colin Bond	George Shepheard	Torana GTR XU-1	64
2	Stewart McLeod	Adrian Mortimer	Datsun 240Z	67
3	Adrian Taylor	John Suominen	Honda Civic	70
4	Bill Evans	Mike Mitchell	Datsun 120Y	80
5	Murray Coote	Brian Marsden	Datsun 1200	81
6	Tom Barr-Smith	Rob Hunt	Leyland P76	89

=== Round Six – Bunbury-Curran Rally ===
Position	Driver	Navigator	Car	Points
1	Colin Bond	George Shepheard	Torana GTR XU-1	31
2	Stewart McLeod	Adrian Mortimer	Datsun 240Z	37
3	Bill Evans	Mike Mitchell	Datsun 120Y	93
4	R Pike	J Cardi	Datsun 180B	95
5	B Moore	R Moore	Toyota Corolla Sprinter	272
6	Brian Hilton	Bruce Mudd	Alfa Romeo Alfetta	278

=== Round Seven – Alpine Rally ===
Position	Driver	Navigator	Car	Points
1	Stewart McLeod	Adrian Mortimer	Datsun 240Z	78
2	Colin Bond	George Shepheard	Torana GTR XU-1	79
3	Adrian Taylor	John Suominen	Honda Civic	93
4	Tom Barr-Smith	R Hunt	Leyland P76	115
5	Dean Rainsford	Graham West	Porsche 911S	123
6	R Pike	J Cardi	Datsun 180B	142

== 1974 Drivers and Navigators Championships ==
Final pointscore for 1974 is as follows.

=== Colin Bond – Champion Driver 1974 ===
Position	Driver	Car	Points
1	Colin Bond	Torana GTR XU-1	42
2	Stewart McLeod	Datsun 240Z	36
3	Ross Dunkerton	Datsun 240Z	16
4	Peter Lang	Torana GTR XU-1	15
5	Bill Evans	Datsun 120Y	14
6	Dean Rainsford	Porsche 911	12

=== George Shepheard – Champion Navigator 1974 ===
Position	Navigator	Car	Points
1	George Shepheard	Torana GTR XU-1	45
2	Adrian Mortimer	Datsun 240Z	36
3	John Large	Datsun 240Z	16
4	Mike Mitchell Graham West	Datsun 120Y	14
5	Graham West	Porsche 911	12
6	John Suominen	Honda Civic	8
