= 1974 South Pacific Touring Series =

The 1974 South Pacific Touring Car Series was an Australian motor racing competition for Group C Touring Cars. It was contested over four rounds, each staged as a support race to an Australian round of the 1974 International Tasman Championship. The series, which was the fourth South Pacific Touring Series, was won by Peter Brock and his entrant, the Holden Dealer Team.

== Round schedule ==
The series was contested over four rounds.

Round	Circuit	Date	Round winner
1	Oran Park	3 February	Peter Brock
2	Surfers Paradise	10 February	Peter Brock
3	Sandown	17 February	John Goss
4	Adelaide	24 February	John Goss

== Classes ==
Cars competed in four engine displacement classes:

- Up to 1300cc
- 1301 to 20000cc
- 2001 to 30000cc
- Over 3000cc

== Points system ==
Points were awarded on a 4-3-2-1 basis to the top four outright placegetters in each round and on a 9-6-4-3-2-1 basis to the top six placegetters in each class in each round. Points were only awarded conditional on the driver competing in the same make and model of car entered by the same entrant in all four rounds.

== Series results ==
Position	Driver & Entrant	Car
1	Peter Brock; Holden Dealer Team	Holden LJ Torana GTR XU-1
2	John Goss; McLeod Ford	Ford Falcon

Note: The series winner was considered to be the driver and his entrant.
