= 1973 Australian Rally Championship =

Seasons
- ← 1972 1974 →

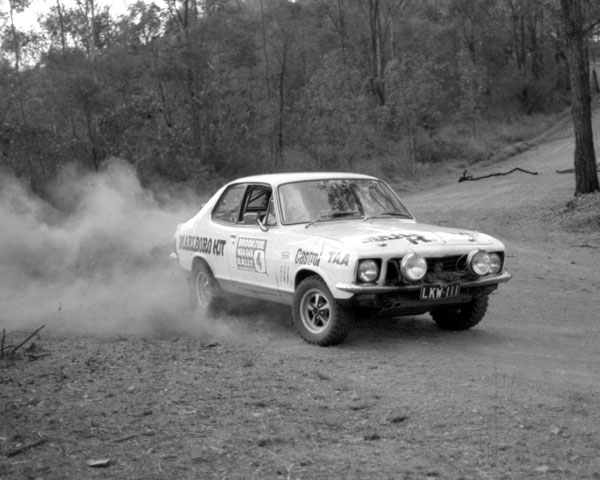
1973 ARC winners Peter Lang and Warwick Smith in the HDT XU-1 Torana

The 1973 Australian Rally Championship was a series of six rallying events held across Australia. It was the sixth season in the history of the competition.

Peter Lang and navigator Warwick Smith in the Holden Torana GTR XU-1 were the winners of the 1973 Championship.

== Season review ==
The sixth Australian Rally Championship was decided over six events, staged across the Eastern States of Australia with two events each in New South Wales and Victoria and one each in Queensland and South Australia. The series saw more domination from the Holden Torana GTR XU-1's which won all six rounds, three wins for Peter Lang/Warwick Smith, two wins for Colin Bond/George Shepheard and one win for Steward McLeod/Adrian Mortimer. Lang and Smith managed high placings in the events that they didn't win and thus convincingly took out the 1973 championship.

== The Rallies ==
The six events of the 1973 season were as follows.

Round	Rally	Date
1	Uniroyal Southern Rally (SA)	10/11 March 1973
2	Classic Rally (VIC)	24/25 March 1973
3	Bunbury Curran (NSW)	14/15 April 1973
4	Bega Valley Rally (NSW)	2–4 June 1973
5	Warana Rally (QLD)	22/23 September 1973
6	Alpine Rally (VIC)	8/9 December 1973

=== Round One – Uniroyal Southern 500 Rally ===
Position	Driver	Navigator	Car	Points
1	Stewart McLeod	Adrian Mortimer	Torana GTR XU-1	68
2	Dean Rainsford	Graham West	Citroen GS	78
3	Tony Roberts	Jeff Beaumont	Peugeot 504	79
4	Colin Bond	George Shepheard	Torana GTR XU-1	87
5	Bob Holden	Roger Bonhomme	Torana GTR XU-1	100
6	Frank Kilfoyle	Mike Osborne	Datsun 240Z	107

=== Round Two – Classic Rally ===
Position	Driver	Navigator	Car	Points
1	Colin Bond	George Shepheard	Torana GTR XU-1	79
2	Peter Lang	Warwick Smith	Torana GTR XU-1	96
3	Tony Roberts	Jeff Beaumont	Peugeot 504	112
4	Ed Mulligan	Mike Batten	Mazda RX-2 Coupe	119
5	Stewart McLeod	Adrian Mortimer	Torana GTR XU-1	135
6	Bruce Hodgson	Fred Gocentas	Ford XA Falcon GTHO	n/a

=== Round Three – Bunbury Curran Rally ===
Position	Driver	Navigator	Car	Points
1	Peter Lang	Warwick Smith	Torana GTR XU-1	24
=2	Stewart McLeod	Adrian Mortimer	Datsun 240Z	38
=2	Frank Kilfoyle	Mike Osborne	Datsun 240Z	38
4	Tony Roberts	Jeff Beaumont	Peugeot 504	53
5	Bruce Hodgson	Fred Gocentas	Ford XA Falcon GTHO	65
6	Wal Glass	R Smith	Holden HR	75

=== Round Four – Bega Valley Rally ===
Position	Driver	Navigator	Car	Points
1	Peter Lang	Warwick Smith	Torana GTR XU-1	79
2	Colin Bond	George Shepheard	Torana GTR XU-1	84
3	Ed Mulligan	Mike Batten	Mazda RX-2 Coupe	85
4	Stewart McLeod	Adrian Mortimer	Torana GTR XU-1	97
5	Roy Denny	Richard Denny	Triumph 2.5 PI	181
6	Wal Glass	R Smith	Holden HR	n/a

=== Round Five – Warana Rally ===
Position	Driver	Navigator	Car	Points
1	Colin Bond	George Shepheard	Torana GTR XU-1	40
2	Ed Mulligan	Mike Batten	Mazda RX-2 Coupe	61
3	John Shera	Lloyd Meller	Mazda 1300	104
4	Peter Lang	Warwick Smith	Torana GTR XU-1	106
5	Bryan Evans	Barry Lake	Datsun 240Z	115
6	Jim Reddiex	Moss Pollack	Citroen GS	168

=== Round Six – Golden Alpine Rally ===
Note that Kilfoyle and Osborne won this event outright in a works Datsun 180B SSS but were ineligible for ARC points.

Position	Driver	Navigator	Car	Points
1	Peter Lang	Warwick Smith	Torana GTR XU-1	118
2	Stewart McLeod	Adrian Mortimer	Torana GTR XU-1	132
3	Bruce Hodgson	Fred Gocentas	Ford XA Falcon GTHO	147
4	Ed Mulligan	Mike Batten	Mazda RX-2 Coupe	156
5	Colin Bond	George Shepheard	Torana GTR XU-1	744
6	Roy Denny	Richard Denny	Triumph 2.5 PI	776

== 1973 Drivers and Navigators Championships ==
Final pointscore for 1973 is as follows.

=== Peter Lang – Champion Driver 1973 ===
Position	Driver	Car	Points
1	Peter Lang	Torana GTR XU-1	36
2	Colin Bond	Torana GTR XU-1	29
3	Stewart McLeod	Torana GTR XU-1	25
4	Ed Mulligan	Mazda RX-2 Coupe	16
5	Tony Roberts	Peugeot 504 & Saab	11
6	Bruce Hodgson	Falcon GT	7
=7	Dean Rainsford	Citroen GS	6
=7	Frank Kilfoyle	Datsun 240Z	6
9	John Shera	Mazda 1300	4
10	Bryan Evans	Datsun 240Z	2

=== Warwick Smith – Champion Navigator 1973 ===
Position	Navigator	Car	Points
1	Warwick Smith	Torana GTR XU-1	36
2	George Shepheard	Torana GTR XU-1	29
3	Adrian Mortimer	Torana GTR XU-1	25
4	Mike Batten	Mazda RX-2 Coupe	16
5	Jeff Beaumont	Peugeot 504 & Saab	11
6	Fred Gocentas	Falcon GT	7
=7	Grahame West	Citroen GS	6
=7	Mike Osborne	Datsun 240Z	6
9	Lloyd Meller	Mazda 1300	4
10	Barry Lake	Datsun 240Z	2
