= 1973 South Pacific Touring Series =

The 1973 South Pacific Touring Car Series was an Australian motor racing competition for Group C Touring Cars. It was contested over four rounds, run in conjunction with the Australian rounds of the 1973 Tasman Series. The series, which was the third South Pacific Touring Series, was won by Peter Brock and his entrant, the Holden Dealer Team.

== Round schedule ==
The series was contested over four rounds.

| Round | Circuit | Date | Winning driver | Winning entrant | Car |
| 1 | Surfers Paradise International Raceway | 4 February | Peter Brock | Holden Dealer Team | Holden Torana GTR XU-1 |
| 2 | Warwick Farm | 11 February | Colin Bond | Holden Dealer Team | Holden Torana GTR XU-1 |
| 3 | Sandown | 18 February | Peter Brock | Holden Dealer Team | Holden Torana GTR XU-1 |
| 4 | Adelaide International Raceway | 25 February | Peter Brock | Holden Dealer Team | Holden Torana GTR XU-1 |

== Classes ==
Cars competed in four engine displacement classes:

- Class A: 0 to 1300cc
- Class B: 1301 to 2000cc
- Class C: 2001 to 3000cc
- Class D: 3001 to 6000cc

== Points system ==
Points were awarded on a 4-3-2-1 basis to the first four outright placegetters in each round and on a 9-6-4-3-2-1 basis to the first six placegetters in each class in each round.

Points were only awarded conditional on the driver competing in the same make and model of car entered by the same entrant in all four rounds.

== Series results ==
| Position | Driver & Entrant | Car |
| 1 | Peter Brock; Holden Dealer Team | Holden Torana GTR XU-1 |

Note: The series winner was considered to be the driver and his/her entrant with each receiving equal recognition.
