= 1970 Australian Rally Championship =

Seasons
- ← 1969 1971 →

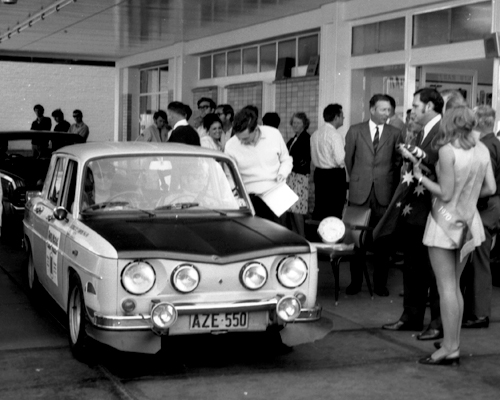
Series winners Bob Watson and Jim McCauliffe in the Renault R8 Gordini at the start of the final round for 1970, the Warana Rally.

The 1970 Australian Rally Championship was a series of five rallying events held across Australia. It was the third season in the history of the competition.

Bob Watson and navigator Jim McCauliffe in the Renault R8 Gordini were the winners of the 1970 Championship.

== Season review ==
The third Australian Rally Championship was decided over five events, with two in Victoria and one each in Queensland, New South Wales and South Australia. The series was dominated by the Renault R8 Gordinis, with Watson and McCauliffe winning four of the five rounds and coming second in the other. Their closest challenge was from Colin Bond and Brian Hope in the new Holden Monaro GTS 350.

== The Rallies ==
The five events of the 1970 season were as follows.

Round	Rally	Date
1	Eureka Rally (VIC)	28 February 1970
2	Blue Ribbon Rally (VIC)	
3	Snowy Mountains Rally (NSW)	
4	Cambridge Toyota Rally (SA)	
5	Warana Rally (QLD)	19/20 September 1970

=== Round One – Eureka Rally ===
Position	Driver	Navigator	Car	Points
1	Bob Watson	Jim McCauliffe	Renault R8 Gordini	
2	Rex Lunn	John Hall	Toyota Corona MKII Hardtop	
3	Mal McPherson	Robin Sharpley	Renault R8 Gordini	
4	Tony Roberts	Haas	Holden Torana GTR	

=== Round Three – Cibie Snowy Rally ===
Position	Driver	Navigator	Car	Points
1	Bob Watson	Jim McCauliffe	Renault R8 Gordini	16
2	Colin Bond	Brian Hope	Holden Monaro 350	17
3	Max Winkless	Peter Meyer	Volvo 142S	21
4	Bruce Collier	Peter Haas	Renault R8 Gordini	31
5	Peter Houghton	Mick Nielson	Peugeot 404	36
6	Mal McPherson	Roger Bonhomme	Renault R8 Gordini	38

=== Round Five – Warana Rally ===
Position	Driver	Navigator	Car	Points
1	Bob Watson	Jim McCauliffe	Renault R8 Gordini	51
2	Colin Bond	George Shepheard	Holden Monaro 350	72
3	Mal McPherson	Robin Sharpley	Renault R8 Gordini	77
4	Roger Brameld	Gerry Brameld	Isuzu Bellett	145
5	Brian Michelmore	Greg Sked	Ford Cortina MKI	147
6	Ron Daniels	Roy Spillane	Renault R8	155

== 1970 Drivers and Navigators Championships ==
Final pointscore for 1970 is as follows.

=== Bob Watson – Champion Driver 1970 ===
Position	Driver	Car	Points
1	Bob Watson	Renault R8 Gordini	
2	Colin Bond	Holden Monaro 350	
3	Mal McPherson	Renault R8 Gordini	
4	Tony Roberts		
5	Stewart McLeod		
6	Peter Robertson		

=== Jim McAuliffe – Champion Navigator 1970 ===
Position	Navigator	Car	Points
1	Jim McAuliffe	Renault R8 Gordini	
2	Brian Hope	Holden Monaro 350	
3	Robin Sharpley		
4	Mike Osborne		
5	John Lock		
6	Roger Bonhomme	Renault R8 Gordini	
