= South Pacific Touring Series =

- Category: Group E Series Production Touring Cars; Group C Touring Cars
- Country: Australia
- Inaugural season: 1970
- Folded: 1975
- Last Drivers' champion: (Australia) Colin Bond
- Last Makes' champion: Holden
- Last Teams' champion: Holden Dealer Team

The South Pacific Touring Series was an Australian Touring car racing series held annually from 1970 to 1975 during the month of February in conjunction with the Tasman Series for open-wheelers. Races counting towards the series were staged at Surfers Paradise in Queensland, Warwick Farm and Oran Park in Sydney, Sandown Park in Melbourne and, from 1972, at the Adelaide International Raceway in South Australia.

== History ==
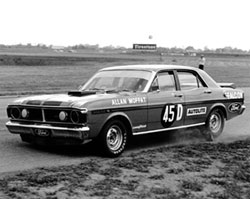
Allan Moffat contesting the Surfers Paradise round of the 1972 series in a Ford XY Falcon GTHO Phase III

The 1970 series was run under the name Tasman Touring Series, with the South Pacific Touring Series name adopted for 1971. Up until 1972 the series was open to Group E Series Production Touring Cars and from 1973 onwards, like the Bathurst 1000 endurance race, it was switched to the new Australian Group C Touring Car regulations. The position of the series on the Australian racing calendar meant that it was the first title to be contested by the Chrysler, Ford and Holden teams each year.

A Manufacturers Trophy was awarded in addition to a drivers title in 1970 and 1971. From 1972 the Entrant of the car driven by the driver gaining the most points in the series was awarded equal recognition with the winning driver. Ford works team lead driver Allan Moffat was the winning driver in 1970 with the Ford awarded the Manufacturers Trophy. John Goss took the title driving for McLeod Ford in 1972. The Holden Dealer Team and its drivers won the title four times, with Colin Bond winning in 1971 and 1975 and Peter Brock victorious in 1973 and 1974.

The 1971 series became the focus of a documentary featuring the Holden Dealer Team.

Like the Tasman Series, the South Pacific series was in decline by the mid-1970s due to the greater importance put on the Australian Touring Car Championship and it was discontinued after 1975.

== List of series winners ==
Year	Series name	Series winners	Car
1970	Tasman Touring Series	Allan Moffat; Ford (Manufacturers Trophy)	Ford XW Falcon GTHO Phase 1
1971	South Pacific Touring Series	Colin Bond; Holden (Manufacturers Award)	Holden LC Torana GTR XU-1
1972	South Pacific Touring Series	John Goss; McLeod Ford	Ford XY Falcon GTHO Phase III
1973	South Pacific Touring Series	Peter Brock; Holden Dealer Team	Holden LJ Torana GTR XU-1
1974	South Pacific Touring Series	Peter Brock; Holden Dealer Team	Holden LJ Torana GTR XU-1
1975	South Pacific Touring Series	Colin Bond; Holden Dealer Team	Holden LH Torana SL/R 5000 L34
