= 1965 International 6 Hour Touring Car Race =

The 1965 International 6 Hour Touring Car Race was a six-hour endurance race for touring cars held at the Sandown Park circuit in Victoria, Australia on 21 November 1965. The race, which was open to cars classified in Group 1 of international Appendix J, was the second in a sequence of races which would evolve into the Sandown 500. The race was won by Frank Gardner and Kevin Bartlett driving an Alfa Romeo TI Super entered by Alec Mildren Racing.

== Classes ==
Cars competed in five classes according to engine capacity.

- Class A : Over 3000cc
- Class B : 2001–3000cc
- Class C : 1501–2000cc
- Class D : 1101–1500cc
- Class E : Up to 1100cc

== Results ==
Position	Drivers	No.	Car	Entrant	Class	Class position	Laps
1	Frank Gardner; Kevin Bartlett	26	Alfa Romeo TI Super	Alec Mildren Racing Pty Ltd	C	1	231
2	Steve Holland; Albert Poon	31	Ford Cortina Lotus	Steve Holland	C	2	227
3	Bob Holden; Ron Haylen	48	Morris Cooper S	Killara Motor Garage	D	1	217
4	John Newmarch; Dennis Dix	23	Prince Skyline GT	McDonald Motors Pty Ltd	C	3	217
5	William Stanley; Digby Cooke	50	Morris Cooper S	Marque Motors	D	2	216
6	Max Volkers; Barry Broomhall	27	Ford Cortina Lotus	Max Volkers	C	4	216
7	Rod Murphy; Terry Murphy	45	Isuzu Bellett	Aid Motors Pty Ltd	D	3	216
8	Brian Sampson; William Buckle	43	Toyota Corona	Australian Motor Industries Ltd	D	4	213
9	Fred Sutherland; Alan Mottram	2	Studebaker Lark	C&G Motors Pty Ltd	A	1	213
10	Bob Jane; George Reynolds	29	Ford Cortina Lotus	Ford Motor Company of Australia	C	5	212
11	Peter Brown; Ray Gulson	42	Ford Cortina GT500	Canberra Speed Shop	D	5	210
12	John Roxburgh; Doug Whiteford	12	Holden HD Manual	John Roxburgh Motors	B	1	209
13	Ron King; Alan King	62	Morris Cooper S	Elko Motors Pty Ltd	E	1	209
14	Geoff Russell; Syd Fisher	24	Peugeot 404	PJ Regan Motors Pty Ltd	C	6	207
15	Warren Weldon; Bill Slattery	3	Studebaker Lark	Needham Motors Pty Ltd	A	2	207
16	Bill Burns; B Lawler	7	Jaguar 3.8 Automatic	Bill Burns	A	3	207
17	Ron Stelmack; Barry Coutts	14	Fiat 2300	High Crest Motors Pty Ltd	B	2	206
18	John Peebles; Ross Edwards	4	Ford Mustang Automatic	Auto-Marine Land / Peter Wright Motors	A	4	205
19	Bob Brown; Gavin Bailieu	61	Morris Cooper S	BJ Auto Services Pty Ltd	E	2	202
20	David Fraser; Brian McGrath	54	Renault R8 Gordini	Renno Motors	D	6	202
21	Ewan Fraser; Bruce Hindhaugh	63	Morris Cooper S	Head Brothers	E	3	197
22	Brian Reed; Max Stewart	21	Triumph 2000	Australian Motor Industries Ltd	C	7	195
23	Les Palmer; Terry Morris	11	Holden HD Automatic	Kelly Brothers Motors	B	3	195
24	Don Preece; Dick Thurston	6	Jaguar 3.4 Mk1	Hyperform Auto Services	A	5	195
25	Pat Crea; Ron Grose	46	Isuzu Bellett	Aid Motors Pty Ltd	D	7	193
26	Garry Shoesmith; Anthony Robards	64	Vauxhall Viva	Gerry Shoesmith	E	4	193
27	Dianne Leighton; Kaye Whiteford	65	Vauxhall Viva	Winter & Taylor (Geelong) Pty Ltd	E	5	182
28	Mal Bailey; J Hicks	22	Prince Skyline GT	Malcolm Bailey	C	8	181
29	Max Patterson; Ian Forde	66	Morris 850	MJ Patterson	E	6	178
DNF	Allan Moffat; Jim Palmer	28	Ford Cortina Lotus	Allan Moffat	C	-	224
DNF	Kevin Burns; Frank Porter	44	Isuzu Bellett	Aid Motors Pty Ltd	D	-	?
DNF	Jim Russell; Clarrie Head	52	Morris Cooper S	Head Brothers	D	-	?
DNF	Hugh Bryson; J Crawford	5	Jaguar 3.8 Mk2	Bryson Industries Ltd	A	-	?
DNF	Roberto Bussinello; Ralph Sachs	25	Alfa Romeo GTA	Alec Mildren Racing Pty Ltd	C	-	99
DNF	John Connelly; Gerry Merrett	53	Renault R8 Gordini	L Park Tyre Service Pty Ltd	D	-	?
DNF	Spencer Martin; William Brown	55	Renault R8 Gordini	Renault Australia	D	-	?
DNF	Brian Foley; Peter Manton	47	Morris Cooper S	Brian Foley Motors	D	-	?
DNF	Barry Seton; Harry Firth	41	Ford Cortina GT500	Ford Motor Company of Australia	C	-	0
DNF	Charlie Smith; L Stewart	49	Morris Cooper S	C Smith	D	-	0

39 cars started the race and 29 finished. Names of drivers who were entered in the car but did not drive during the race are shown within brackets.

=== Awards ===
- 1st automatic to finish – Car No 7 – Bill Burns & B Lawler (Jaguar 3.8 Automatic)
- 1st Woman's Team to finish – Car No 65 – Dianne Leighton & Kaye Whiteford (Vauxhall Viva)
- 1st Nominated Team – Cars 48 & 50 – Bob Holden & Ron Haylen (Morris Cooper S) and William Stanley & Digby Cooke (Morris Cooper S)

Preceded by 1964 Sandown 6 Hour International	International 6 Hour Touring Car Race; 1965	Succeeded by 1966-67 Not Held; 1968 Datsun 3 Hour Trophy
