= 1971 Australian Rally Championship =

Seasons
- ← 1970 1972 →

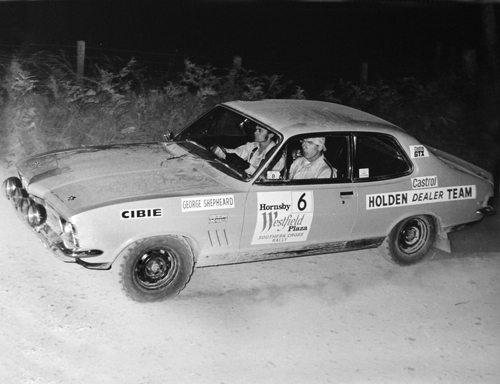
1971 Series winners Colin Bond and George Shepheard in the Holden Dealer Team Holden Torana GTR XU-1.

The 1971 Australian Rally Championship was a series of five rallying events held across Australia. It was the fourth season in the history of the competition.

Colin Bond and navigator George Shepheard in the Holden Dealer Team Holden Torana GTR XU-1 were the winners of the 1971 Championship.

== Season review ==
The fourth Australian Rally Championship was decided over five events, staged across the Eastern States of Australia with two events in New South Wales and one each in Queensland, Victoria and South Australia. The series was the start of the domination of the Holden Dealer Team Holden Torana GTR XU-1 of Colin Bond and George Shepheard. The Renault R8 Gordinis which had won the previous year were the only team to present any real challenge to the Toranas.

== The Rallies ==
The five events of the 1971 season were as follows.

Round	Rally	Date
1	Classic Rally (VIC)	20 March 1971
2	Bunbury-Curran Rally (NSW)	17 April 1971
3	Snowy Mountains Rally (NSW)	12 June 1971
4	Uniroyal Southern Rally (SA)	31 July 1971
5	Warana Rally (QLD)	18 September 1971

=== Round Three – Snowy Mountains Rally ===
Position	Driver	Navigator	Car	Points
1	Colin Bond	George Shepheard	Torana GTR XU-1	36
2	Barry Ferguson	Dave Johnson	Torana GTR XU-1	59
3	Bruce Collier	Lindsay Adcock	Renault R8 Gordini	60
4	Stewart McLeod	Jack Lock	Torana GTR XU-1	68
5	Bob Watson	Andy Chapman	Renault R8 Gordini	82
6	Peter Haughton	Jim Faulkner	Mitsubishi Colt 1100	83

=== Round Five – Warana Rally ===
Position	Driver	Navigator	Car	Points
1	Colin Bond	George Shepheard	Torana GTR XU-1	39
2	Frank Kilfoyle	Mike Osborne	Torana GTR XU-1	47
3	Bob Watson	Andy Chapman	Renault R8 Gordini	57
4	Brian Michelmore	Greg Sked	Alfa Romeo 1750 GTV	59
5	Charlie Lund	Murray Coote	Mazda RX-2	69
6	Greg Smith	Rod Browning	Torana GTR XU-1	93
7	Peter Janson	Mike Mitchell	Holden Monaro GTS 350	94
8	Mal McPherson	Jeff Beaumont	Renault R8 Gordini	95
9	Roger Bonhomme	G Thomas	Renault R8 Gordini	96
10=	John Connell	Gerry Brameld	Holden Monaro GTS 186	110
10=	John McLean	Laurie Garth	Fiat 124	110

== 1971 Drivers and Navigators Championships ==
Final pointscore for 1971 is as follows.

=== Colin Bond – Champion Driver 1971 ===
Position	Driver	Car	Points
1	Colin Bond	Torana GTR XU-1	
2	Bob Watson	Renault R8 Gordini	
3	Frank Kilfoyle	Torana GTR XU-1	
4=	Stewart McLeod	Torana GTR XU-1	
4=	Barry Ferguson	Torana GTR XU-1	
4=	Mal McPherson	Renault R8 Gordini	

=== George Shepheard – Champion Navigator 1971 ===
Position	Navigator	Car	Points
1	George Shepheard	Torana GTR XU-1	
2	Andy Chapman	Renault R8 Gordini	
3	Mike Osborne	Torana GTR XU-1	
4=	David Johnson	Torana GTR XU-1	
4=	Jeff Beaumont	Renault R8 Gordini	
6	Jack Lock	Torana GTR XU-1	
