= 1970 Tasman Touring Series =

The 1970 Tasman Touring Series was an Australian motor racing competition for Series Production Touring Cars. It was the inaugural Tasman Touring Series and was run in conjunction with the Tasman Series for open wheel racing cars.

The series was won by Allan Moffat driving a Ford Falcon GTHO.

== Schedule ==
The series comprised three rounds, each held in support of an Australian round of the 1970 Tasman Championship.

Rd	Race	Circuit	State	Date	Winning driver	Car
1		Surfers Paradise	Queensland	8 February	Allan Moffat	Ford Falcon GTHO
2	New 2UW Trophy	Warwick Farm	New South Wales	15 February	Colin Bond	Holden Monaro GTS350
3	International Motor Show 100	Sandown	Victoria	22 February	Allan Moffat	Ford Falcon GTHO

== Classes ==
Cars competed in five price classes:

- Class A: Up to $1860
- Class B: $1861 to $2250
- Class C: $2251 to $3100
- Class D: $3101 to $4500
- Class E: Over $4500

== Points system ==
Points were awarded on a 9-6-4-3-2-1 basis for the first six positions in each class. Bonus points were awarded on a 3-2-1 basis for the first three outright positions.

== Series standings ==
Pos.	Driver	Car	Class	Entrant	Points
1	Allan Moffat	Ford Falcon GTHO	D	Ford Australia	32
=2	Colin Bond	Holden Monaro GTS350	D	Holden Dealer Team	24
=2	Bill Evans	Datsun 1000	A	Datsun Racing Team	24

Note: Only the first three placegetters are listed in the table.

=== Manufacturers Trophy ===
The Manufacturers Trophy was awarded to Ford Australia.
