= Renault 8 =

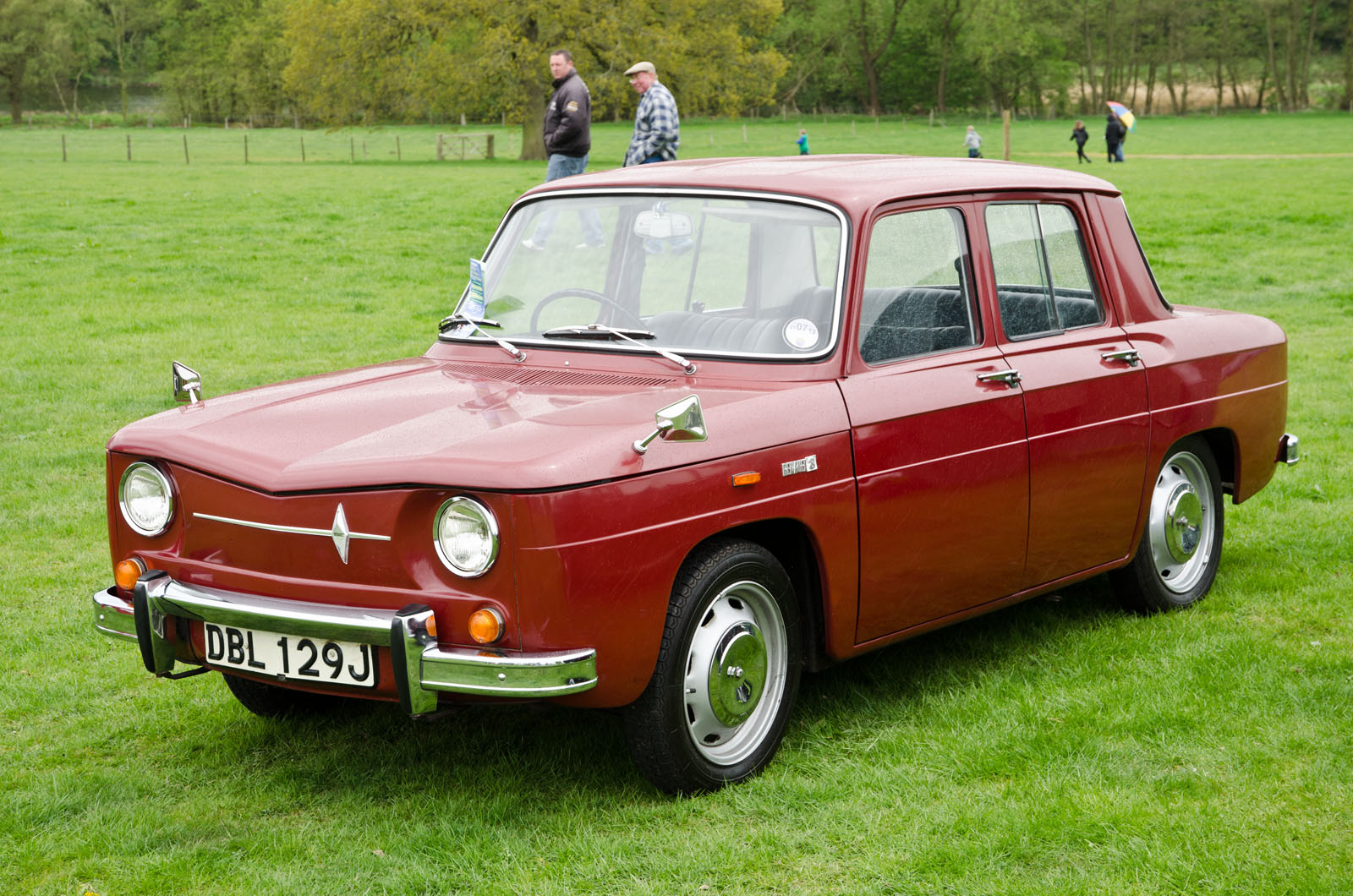
- 1971 Renault 8

Overview
- Manufacturer: Renault
- Also called: Dacia 1100; Bulgarrenault 8
- Production: 1962–1976
- Assembly: France: Flins (Flins Factory); Algeria: Algiers (CARAL); Australia: Heidelberg; Bulgaria: Plovdiv (Bulgarrenault); Canada: Quebec, St. Bruno (SoMA); Mexico: Ciudad Sahagún; Morocco: Casablanca; New Zealand: Thames (Campbell Industries); Romania: Mioveni (Dacia); Spain: Valladolid (FASA-Renault); Portugal: Guarda; Venezuela: Mariara

Body and chassis
- Class: Small family car (C-segment)
- Body style: 4-door saloon
- Layout: Rear-engine, rear-wheel-drive
- Related: Renault 10

Powertrain
- Engine: 956 cc Cléon-Fonte I4; 1108 cc Cléon-Fonte I4; 1255 cc Cléon-Fonte I4
- Transmission: 3-speed manual 4-speed manual 5-speed manual

Dimensions
- Wheelbase: 2,270 mm (89.4 in)
- Length: 4,000 mm (157.5 in)
- Width: 1,490 mm (58.7 in)
- Height: 1,375 mm (54.1 in)

Chronology
- Predecessor: Renault Dauphine
- Successor: Renault 14

The Renault 8 (Renault R8 until 1964) is a small family car produced by the French manufacturer Renault in the 1960s and early 1970s. It is a four-door saloon car with a rear-engine, rear-wheel-drive layout. The 8 also formed the basis for the larger Renault 10, introduced in 1965.

The 8 was launched in 1962 and ceased production and sales in France in 1973. By then the related Renault 10 had already been replaced, two years earlier, by the front wheel drive Renault 12.

They were produced in Bulgaria until 1970 (see Bulgarrenault), and an adapted version of the Renault 8 continued to be produced in Spain until 1976. In Romania, a version of the 8 was produced under license between 1968 and 1972 as the Dacia 1100. In total 37,546 Dacia 1100s were built.

== Renault 8 ==
=== Launch ===
The R8 (model R1130) was released in June 1962 and was based on the Renault Dauphine, with which it shared its basic architecture and its 2,270 mm (89.4 in) wheelbase. The style, closely following that of the first prototype produced, at unusually short notice, by Philippe Charbonneaux, was fashionably boxy; however, while the Renault 8 was actually 30 mm (1.2 in) narrower than the Dauphine, the manufacturer was able to install thick cushioned front seats that were actually each 60 mm (2.4 in) wider, at 560 mm (22.0 in), than those fitted in the Dauphine.

The 8 was powered by an all new 956 cc Cléon-Fonte engine developing 44 PS (32 kW; 43 hp). The R8's engine followed the pioneering example of the recently introduced Renault 4 by incorporating a sealed for life cooling system. A distinctive innovation on the French produced cars was the fitting of four-wheel disc brakes, a first for a saloon car of this size. However, when in 1965 Renault's Spanish affiliate introduced their own version of the Renault 8 for the (then tariff-shielded) Spanish market, it came with rear drum brakes.

The 8 was sold in the United States with an unusual marketing approach that acknowledged that the previous Dauphine had many shortcomings for American owners, and that the 8 was an improvement. While an all new engine was built that was more powerful, and many changes were made, most of the criticism summarized the 8's shortcomings when driving on the recently constructed United States Interstate Highway System as the car was built for French driving conditions which were much more localized. When driving the 8 in city environments, it is nimble and easy to get around crowded conditions. France did not begin to build the Autoroutes of France until French Law 55-435 was passed April 18, 1955, to create a controlled-access highway system, similar to the German Autobahns and the Italian Autostrada, constructed from the 1930s.

=== Automatic transmission ===
For 1963 (initially only in France), Renault offered an automatic transmission of unique design, developed and produced by Jaeger. It was first shown at the September 1962 Paris Motor Show. Although it was described as a form of automatic transmission at the time, in retrospect it was more realistically a form of automatic clutch, inspired by the German Saxomat device which appeared as an option on several mainstream German cars in the 1950s and 60s.

The clutch in the system was replaced by a powder ferromagnetic coupler, developed from a Smiths design. The transmission itself was a three-speed mechanical unit similar to that of the Dauphine, but from the beginning with synchromesh on all gears in this version.

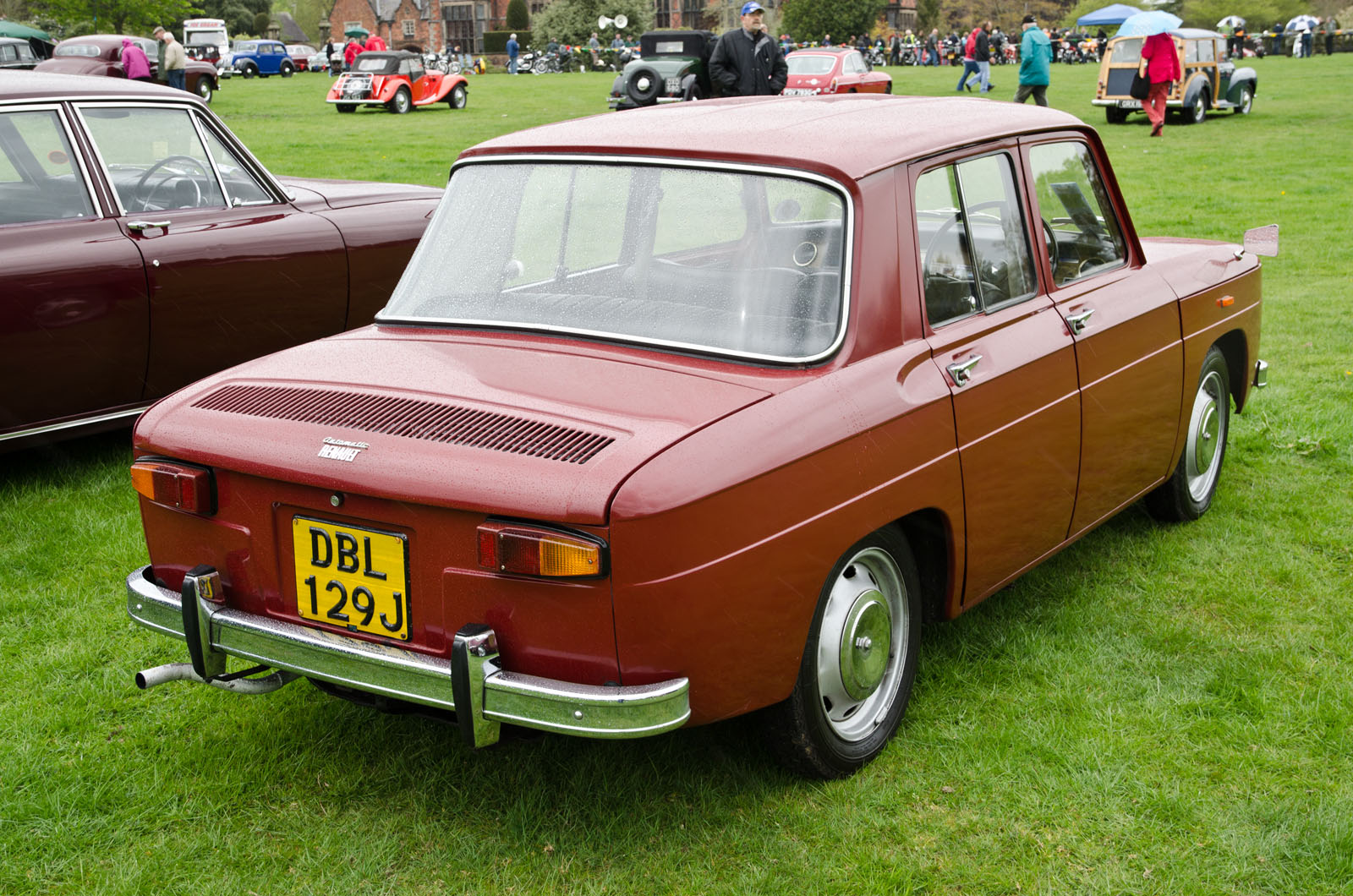
1971 Renault 8 rear view

The system used a dash-mounted push button control panel where the driver could select forward or reverse and a governor that sensed vehicle speed and throttle position.

A "relay case" containing electromagnetic switches received signals from the governor and push buttons and then controlled a coupler, a decelerator to close the throttle during gear changes, and a solenoid to select operation of the reverse-first or second-third shift rail, using a reversible electric motor to engage the gears. The system was thus entirely electromechanical, without hydraulics, pneumatics or electronics. The relay case was located in the front trunk. On cold days, with no source of heat in the trunk area, the relays would freeze and required the "Open, Push, Whack, and Jump". Essentially, the driver had to open the trunk, push the Drive button on the dashboard, whack the relay box, and jump back into the moving vehicle. On extremely cold days, the relay box was unreliable and intermittent, seemingly having a mind of its own.

Benefits included comparable fuel economy to the manual transmission version, and easy adaptability to the car. Drawbacks included performance loss (with only three available gears) and a somewhat jerky operation during gear changes.

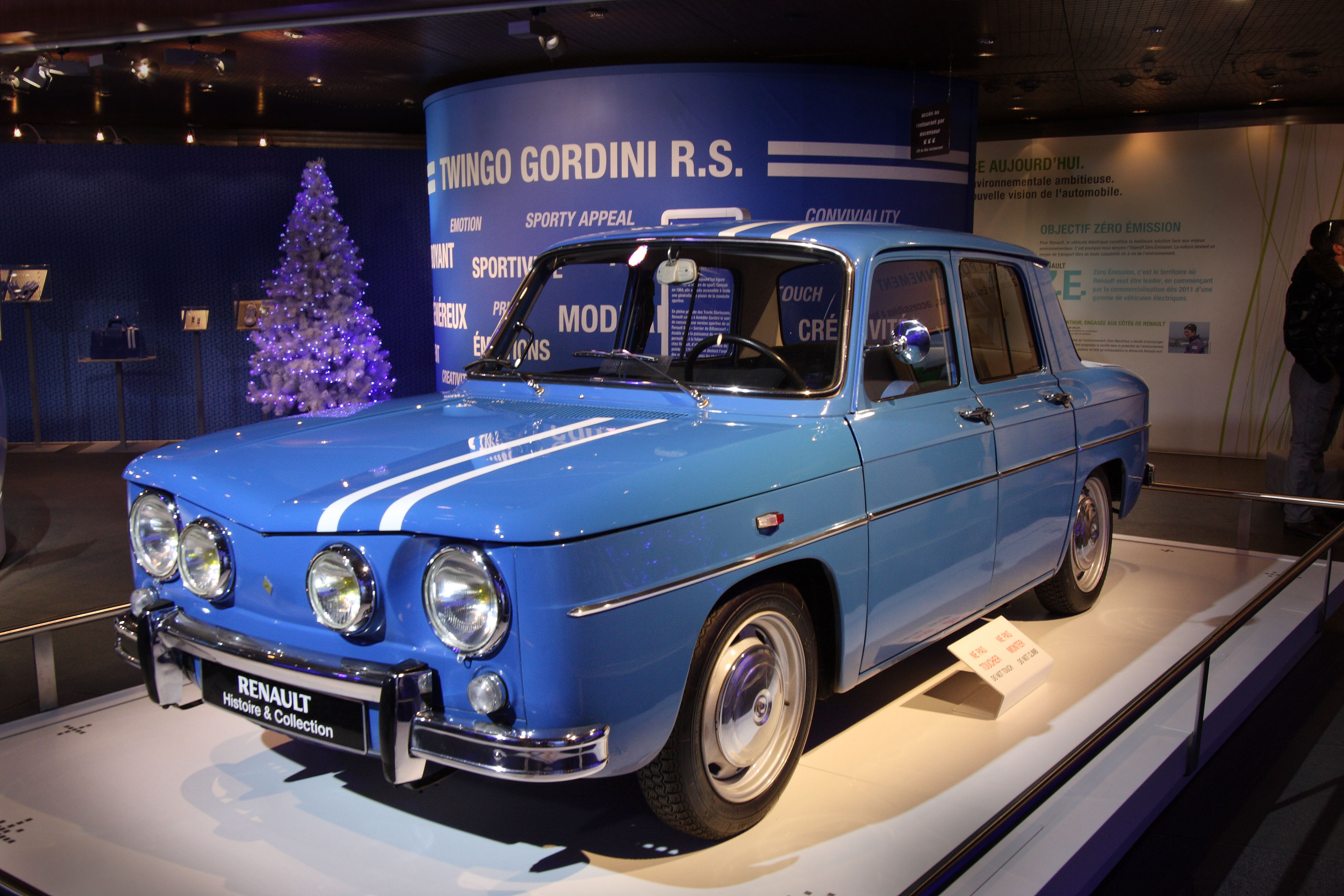
Renault 8 Gordini

The transmission was also used in the Dauphine and the Caravelle.

=== Engine upgrades ===
A more powerful model, the 8 Major (model R1132), was released in 1964, featuring an 1108 cc engine developing 50 PS (37 kW; 49 hp). A still more powerful version, the 8 model R1134 Gordini, was also released that year, with a tuned engine of the same capacity but developing 90 PS (66 kW; 89 hp). The extra power was obtained by a cross-flow head and twin dual-choke 40mm side-draft Solex carburetors. A four-speed close ratio manual transmission, dual rear shock absorbers and uprated springs were fitted. The R1134 Gordini was originally available only in blue, with two stick-on white stripes. It was also distinguishable from the 8 Major by the bigger 200 mm headlamp units. In 1965, the Renault 10 Major, a more luxurious version of the 8 with different front and rear styling, was released, replacing the 8 Major.

=== Facelift ===
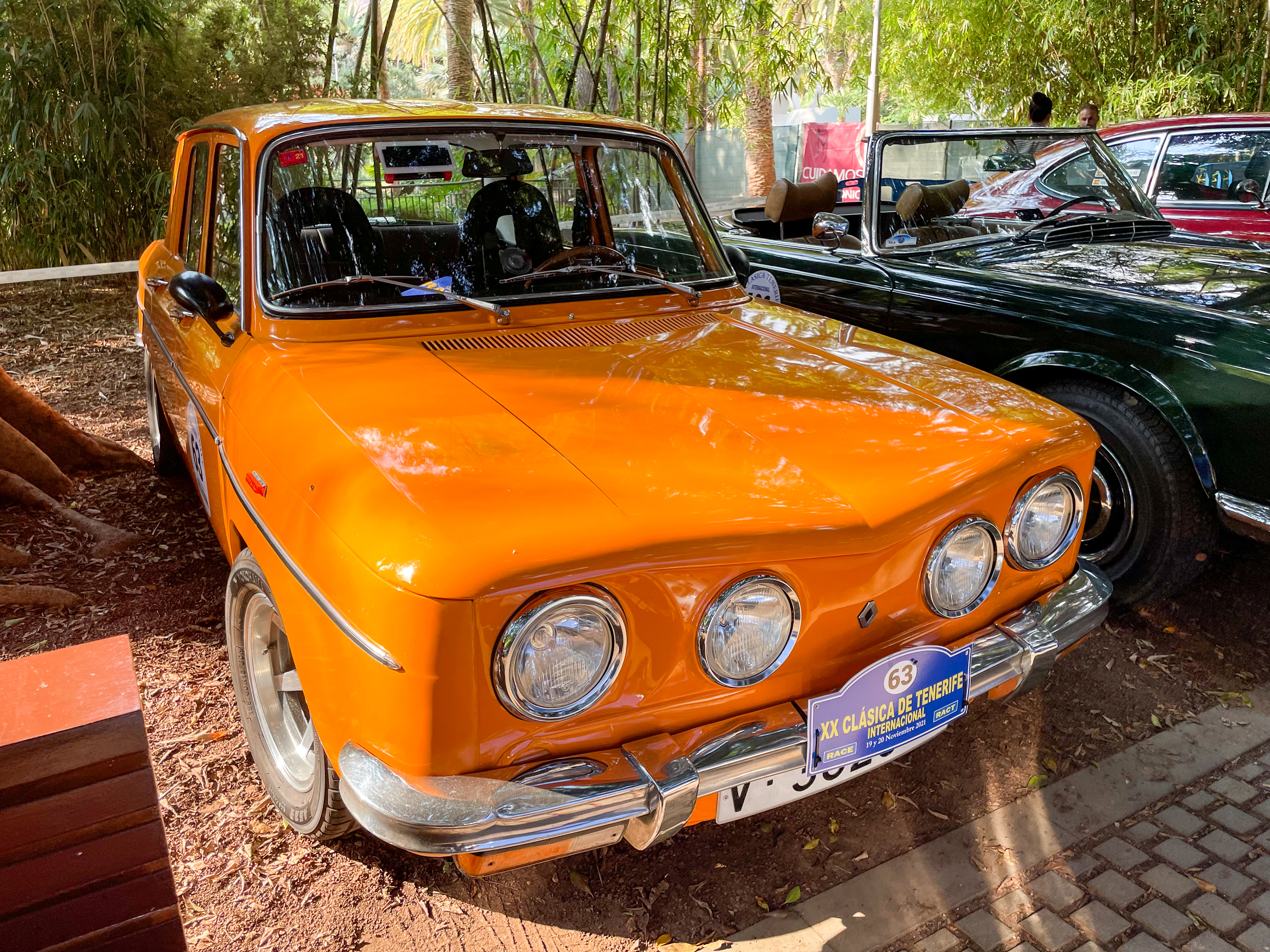
A Renault 8 TS in Tenerife, Spain

In 1967, the R8 Gordini (model R1135) received a facelift including two additional headlights (in effect Cibie Oscar driving lights), and its engine upgraded to a 1255 cc unit rated at 100 PS (74 kW; 99 hp). The R1134 Gordini cross-flow head design was retained, and twin dual-choke 40mm Weber side-draft carburetors. Both the 8 and the 10 were heavily revised for 1969. Some of the 10's features being incorporated in the 8, resulting in a new 8 Major which replaced the basic model. The changes also saw the addition of the 8S, a sportier model with a 1108 cc engine rated at 60 PS (44 kW; 59 hp). The 8S model also had the same twin headlights as the R1135 Gordini – the middle ones were for high beam only. The car was delivered with black "RENAULT 8S" tapes, intended for the rear wings but their fixing was left to the customer. The Romanian sport version was named Dacia 1100 S.

=== End of production ===
Alongside the new Renault 10, less powerful versions of the Renault 8 continued in production at the Flins plant. The 8 was still sold in France as late as 1973. FASA-Renault, the company's Spanish arm, continued to produce models 8 and 8TS (similar to the French-built 8S) until 1976 for the Spanish market, as well as components for the 8S and 8TS assembled in Mexico.

== Gallery ==
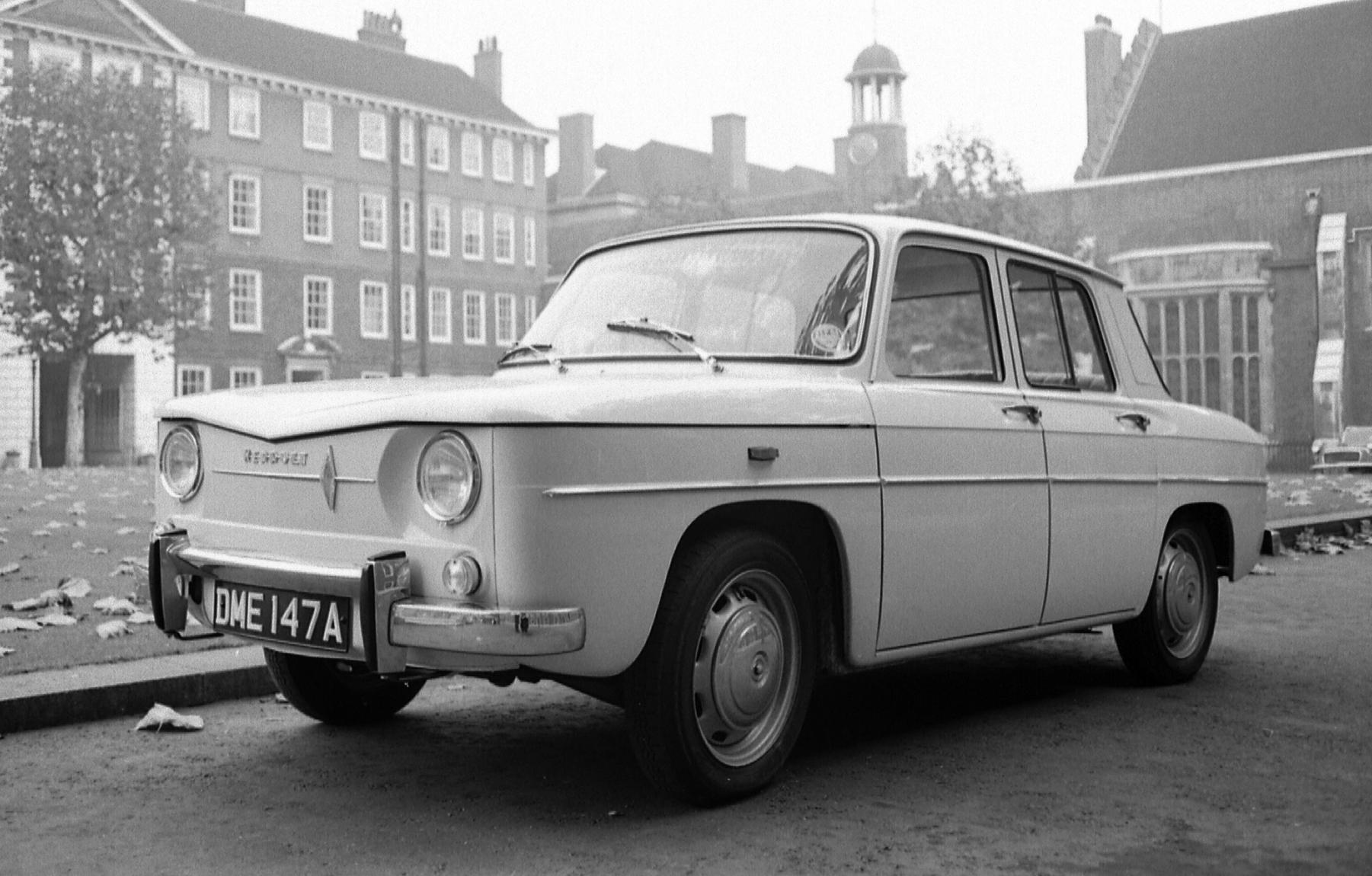
Renault R8 in 1963

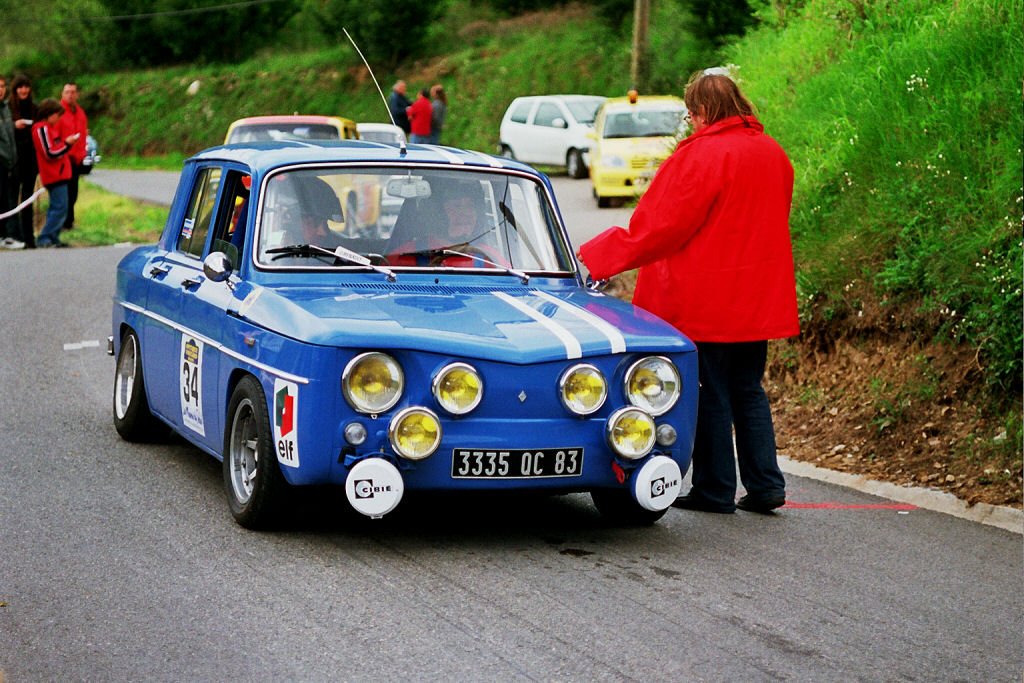
Renault R8 Gordini (1964)

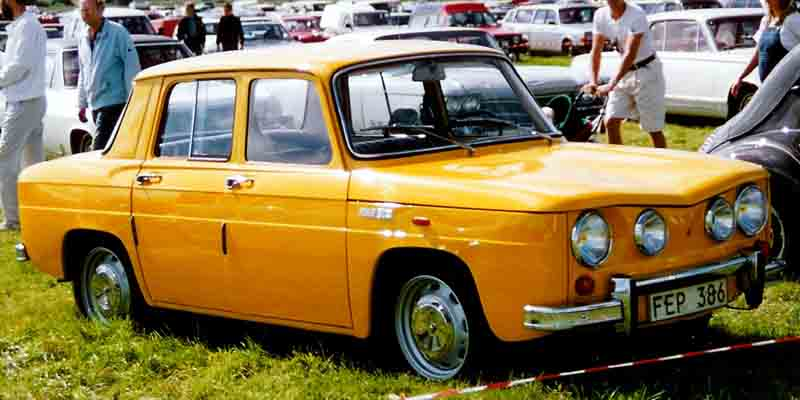
Renault R8 S (1967)

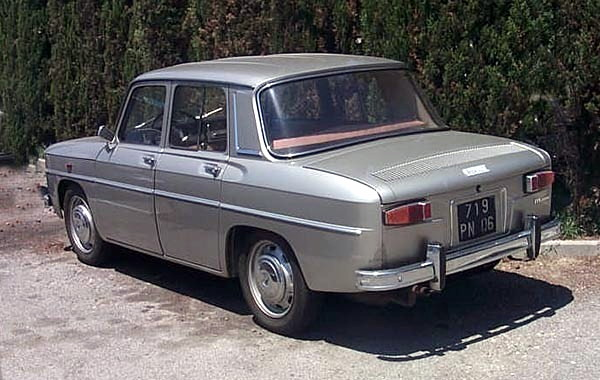
Renault R8

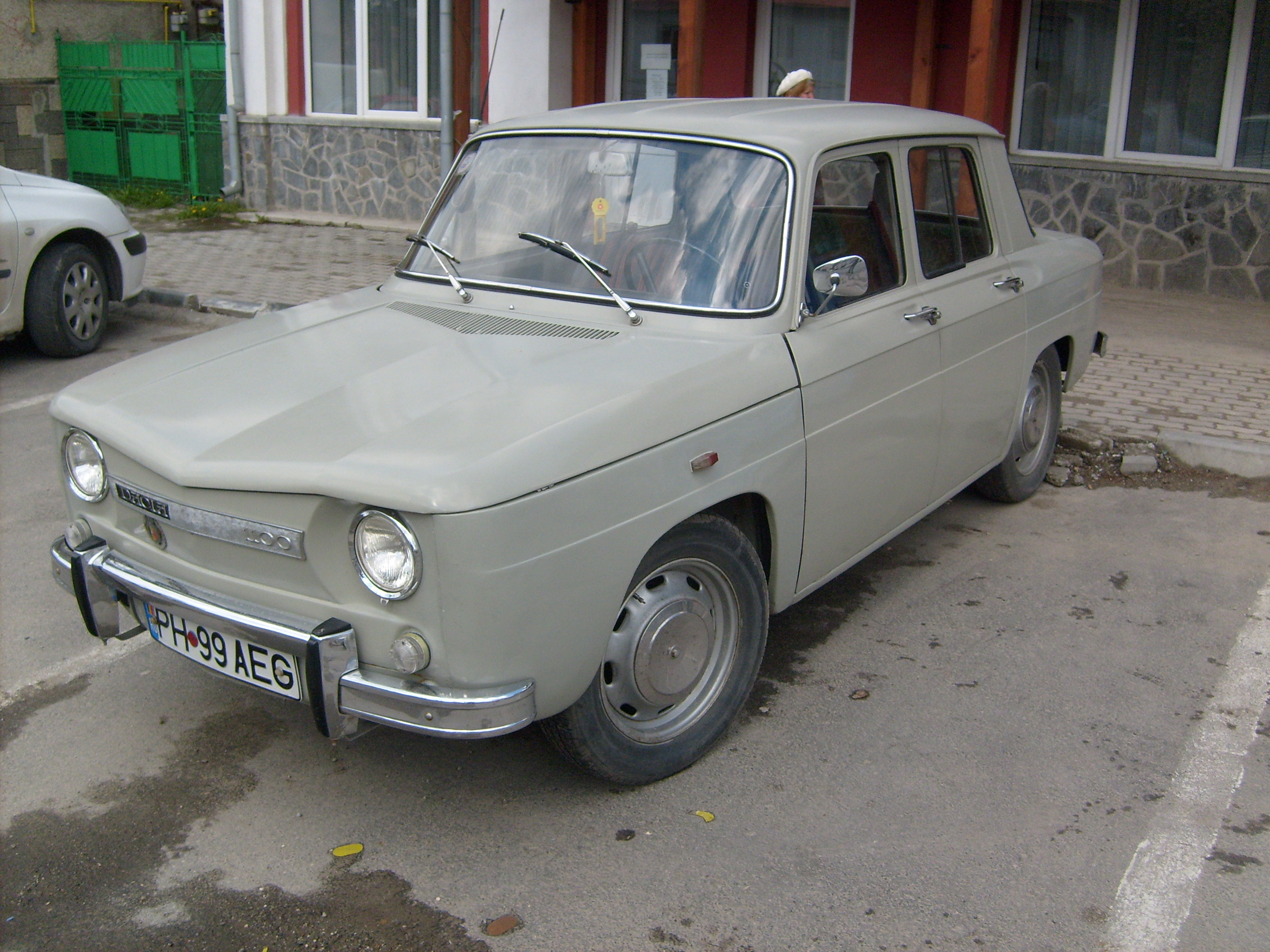
Dacia 1100

== Alconi ==
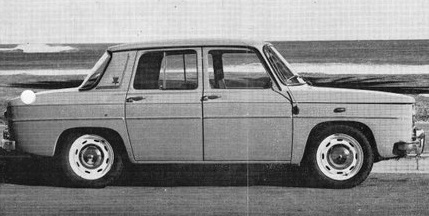
1965 Renault 8 Alconi

Through their South African subsidiary, Renault Africa Ltd, a special performance version of the 1108cc '8' (model 1132) and '10' (model 1190) was assembled at their East London assembly plant. It sold in that country only as a Renault Alconi, a combination the names of the developers, John Conchie and Eric 'Puddles' Adler, who traded as "Alconi Developments".

Engine upgrades resulted in 68 bhp (net) and a performance close to that of the R8 Gordini '1100' and midway between the standard Renault 8 and the 1255 cc Gordini. The Alconis offered 0–60 mph (97 km/h) in 11.9 s, top speed of 97 mph (156 km/h), (according to "Car" magazine road test) and sold for about 10% over the standard car.

It was sold new through their dealer network in South Africa and covered by their factory warranty. The local concept was intended to increase vehicle sales to a racing mad South African public by taking advantage of their race-track successes in local "Sprint" and "Endurance" races.

About 400–500 vehicles seem to have been sold. As well, many hundreds of performance kits to upgrade the standard vehicles were sold over their parts counters.

== In competition ==
=== European Rally victories ===
The car has won the Tour de Corse, Rally Poland, Rallye Açores, Rali Vinho da Madeira, Boucles de Spa and Rajdowe Samochodowe Mistrzostwa Polski.

=== South African Motorsport ===
Renault (Africa) managed sales increases amongst the South African public with their racing and rallying participation and sponsorship program, offering a multitude of Gordini and Alconi race components. During the years 1963–69 when the R8 model was sold, they won seven overall 1st to finish trophies in the annual Kyalami International 9-hour Endurance Races (3 x 4th overall, 1 x 5th overall, 3 x 9th overall). The competition included many international purpose built sports cars (Ferraris, Jaguars, Porsches, Cobras). Also three overall wins in the annual International Total Lourenco Marques Rallies.

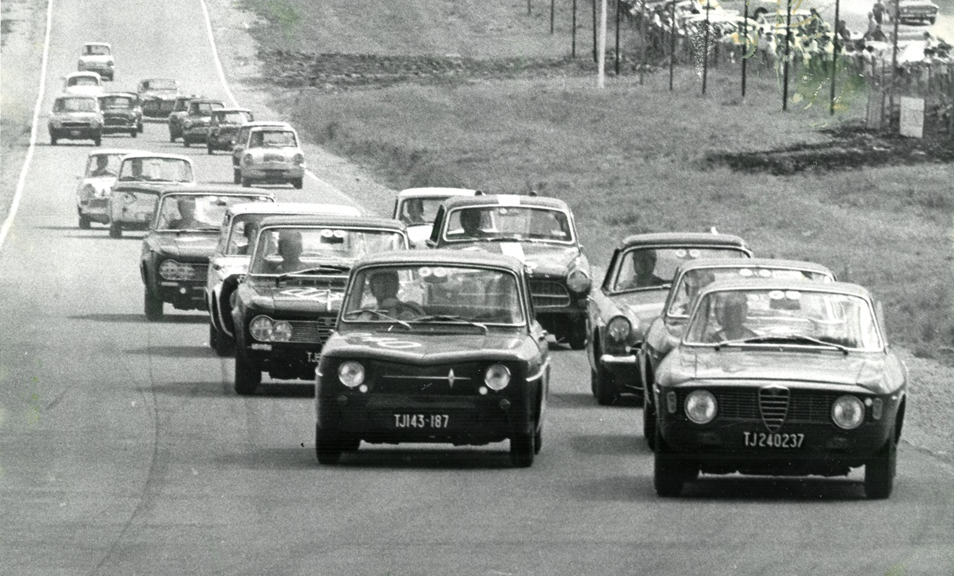
Lap 1, A Renault Alconi on way to winning the race and 1966 Kyalami Onex Trophy title

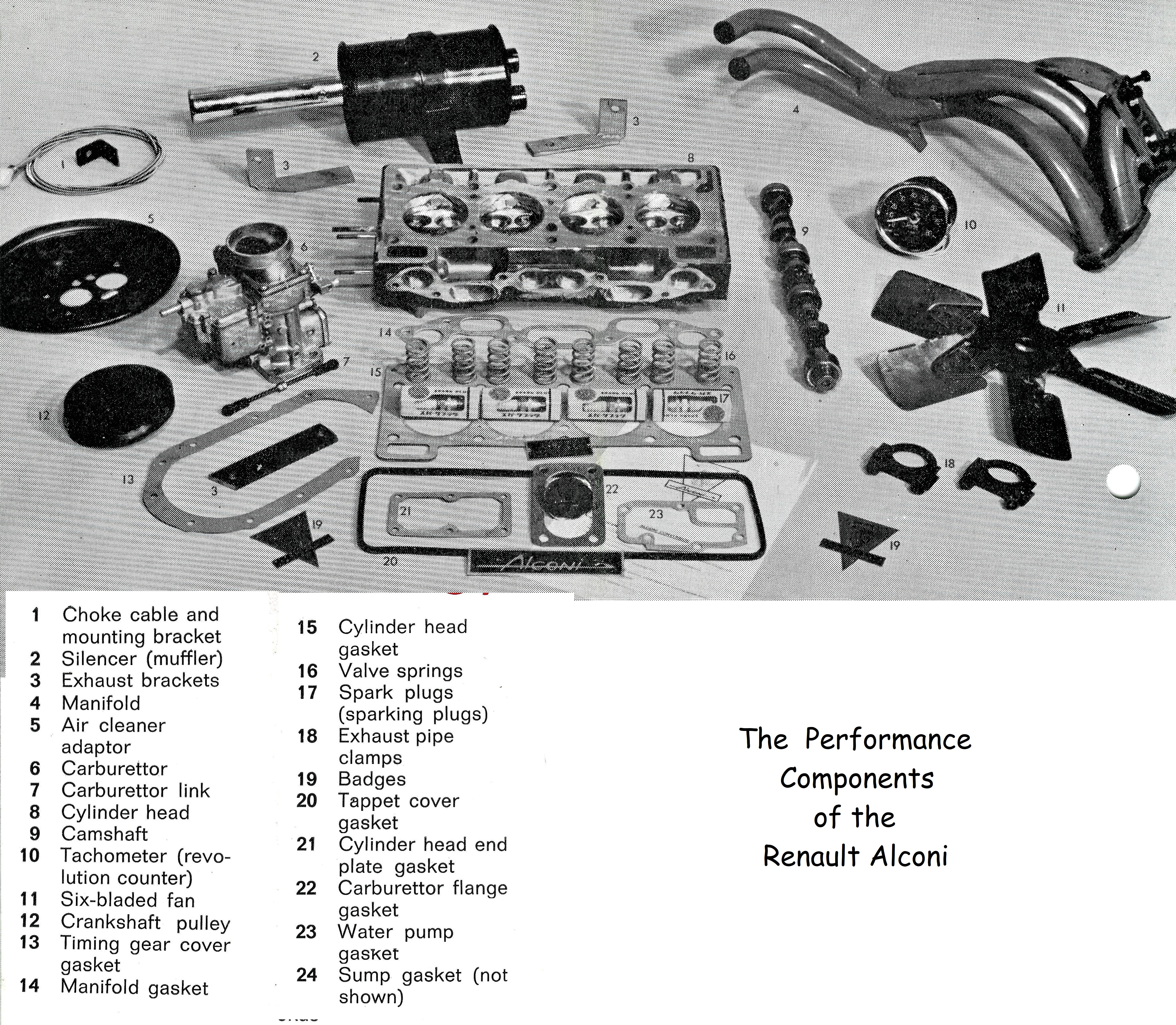
performance compononts of the Alconi kit

Between the years 1963 and 1969, South African motor sport sponsorship by Renault (Africa) Ltd and private driver enthusiasm resulted in class and endurance race and rally domination (including frequent wins) by the R8 and Gordini R8, which enhanced market penetration and popularity of the vehicles Renault R8 and Gordini also won the 1968 and 1970 South African Saloon Car Championship. The car also won the Rallye Côte d'Ivoire and Rallye du Maroc.

=== Australian Motorsport ===
Bob Watson won the 1970 Australian Rally Championship and was runner-up in the 1971 Australian Rally Championship driving an R8 Gordini. R8s also competed in the 1966 Australian Touring Car Championship, 1979 Australian Rallycross Championship, 1973 Hardie-Ferodo 1000 and 1965 International 6 Hour Touring Car Race.

In 1963 the Renault 8 was awarded Wheels Magazine Australia's Car of the Year Award.

== See also ==
- Alfa Romeo Tipo 103 – An influential prototype car constructed in 1960, approximately two years before the June 1962 launch of the Renault 8, and with similar styling.
