= Colin Bond =

Australian racing driver (born 1942)

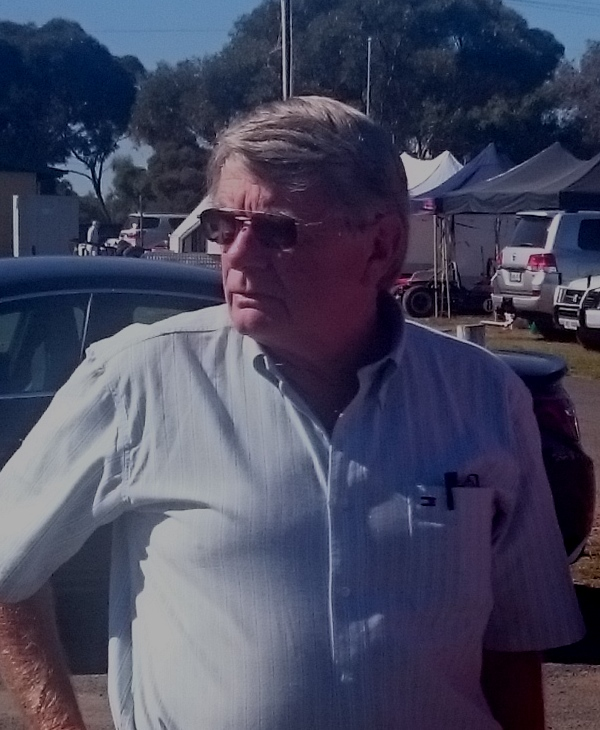
- Bond in 2016
- Nationality: Australian
- Born: Colin John Bond; 24 February 1942 (age 84)
- Retired: 1994

Australian Touring Car Championship
- Years active: 1971–1993
- Teams: Holden Dealer Team; Moffat Ford Dealer Team; Masterton Homes Racing; Caltex CXT Racing
- Starts: 126
- Wins: 10
- Best finish: 1st in 1975 Australian Touring Car Championship

Previous series
- 1970–80 1976 1982–83: Australian Rally Championship; Australian Sports Sedan Championship; Australian GT Championship

Championship titles
- 1971 1971 1972 1974 1975 1988: South Pacific Touring Car Series; Australian Rally Championship; Australian Rally Championship; Australian Rally Championship; South Pacific Touring Car Series; AMSCAR Touring Car Series

Awards
- 2002: V8 Supercars Hall of Fame

Colin John Bond OAM (born 24 February 1942) is an Australian former racing driver. Bond reached the highest levels in Australian motorsport in 1969 when he was recruited by Harry Firth to the newly formed Holden Dealer Team. He quickly found success, winning the 1969 Hardie-Ferodo 500 mile race (now the Bathurst 1000) at Bathurst, New South Wales in a Holden Monaro.

Bond was a particularly versatile driver, also finding success in the Australian Rally Championship, winning the title in 1971, 1972 and 1974 driving a Holden Torana. Bond also won the 1975 Australian Touring Car Championship in a Holden Torana and was inducted into the V8 Supercars Hall of Fame in 2002.

== Early career ==
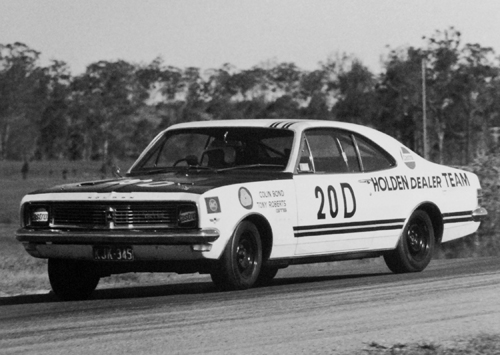
Colin Bond in the Holden Dealer Team Monaro at Lakeside International Raceway in 1970.

Bond initially made a reputation as a hillclimber with three NSW Hillclimb titles in 1965-67 driving a Lynx-Peugeot S/C. Also known as a rally driver he was relatively unknown in circuit racing circles apart from a few forays racing various Isuzu Belletts, when he was chosen to partner Tony Roberts in one of three Holden Dealer Team entered Holden Monaros for the 1969 Hardie-Ferodo 500 at Bathurst. On a day when the Fords crumbled with unsuitable tyres for the race, the HDT stood strong, putting all three Monaros (including one driven by Des West and Peter Brock which finished third) into the top six positions with Bond and Roberts winning.

== Torana GTR XU-1 ==
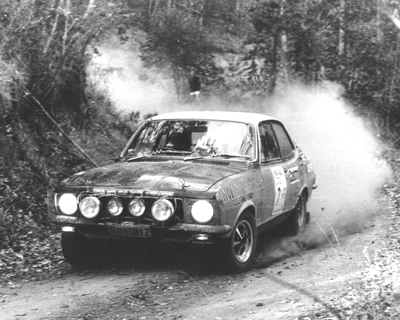
Bond and Shepheard in the Holden Dealer Team Torana GTR XU-1 on their way to another win in the Warana Rally, round four of the 1972 Australian Rally Championship.

The nimble 6-cylinder Torana GTR XU-1 debuted in late 1970, and in 1971, Bond began racking up an impressive list of race and rally titles in his Torana. He secured the Manufacturer's Championship for Holden by winning three out of five rounds, including the Sandown 250 enduro in his XU-1. He also won the Australian Rally Championship and the Southern Cross Rally, along with the South Pacific Touring Series that year.

Late in 1971, Bond had a couple of drives with Frank Matich's F5000 team. One was in the Australian Grand Prix at Warwick Farm and driving in a wet practice session Bond put in lap times seconds faster than his more experienced F5000 rivals. After his open-wheeler stint he opted to stay with the Holden Dealer Team.

The following year, Bond won the Australian Rally Championship for the second year in a row. Bond also won the Catalina Park rallycross series, while on the bitumen he won the Toby Lee Series and Sun-7 Gold Medal. In 1973, he again won the Sun-7 series at Amaroo Park.

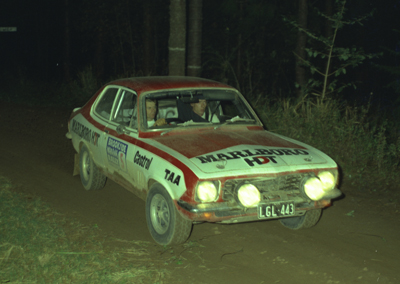
1974 ARC winners Colin Bond and George Shepheard in the HDT Torana GTR XU-1 at the Warana Rally, round five of the 1974 Australian Rally Championship.

In 1974, as well as winning his third national Rally Championship, Bond won his third consecutive Sun-7 Chesterfield Series against a strong challenge by Bob Morris.

== Torana L34 ==
In late 1974, driving the new Holden Torana SL/R 5000, he contributed to Holden's victory in the Australian Manufacturers' Championship, again winning three out of five rounds.

Peter Brock left the Holden Dealer Team at the end of 1974 so for the 1975 season Colin Bond was the team's No.1 driver. That year he won his only Australian Touring Car Championship in the new L34 version of the SL/R 5000 Torana, and also won his second South Pacific Touring Car Series. At Bathurst Bond claimed pole position from the Ford XB Falcon GT Hardtop of Allan Moffat and led for much of the early part of the race until a broken axle at half distance put him too far back to challenge the similar Torana Peter Brock and Brian Sampson.

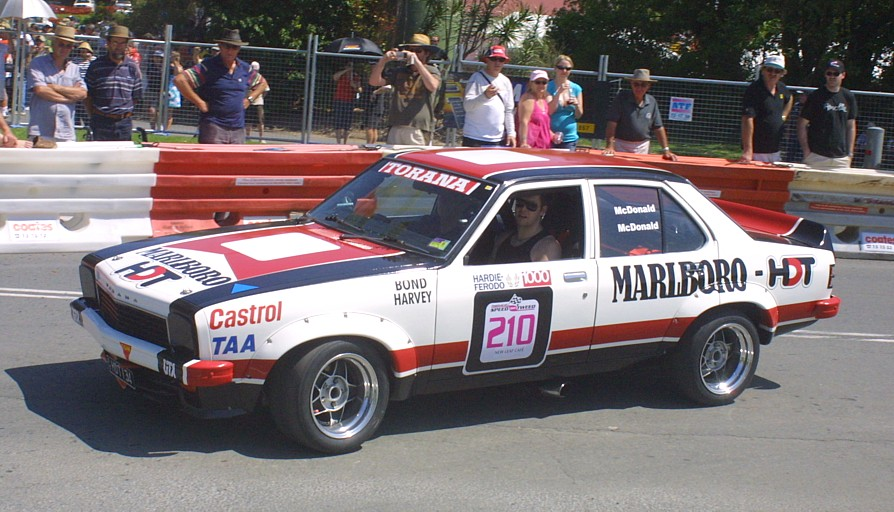
Reproduction of the 1976 Bathurst Bond/Harvey Torana

Bond was involved in a dramatic finish in 1976 at the Bathurst 1000. Late in the race when it seemed Bond, in the Holden Dealer Team Torana L34, had the race sewn up he was forced to pull into the pits with fanbelt trouble allowing the Bob Morris Torana to take the lead. In the final laps Morris's co-driver, British touring car ace John Fitzpatrick, nursed home an ailing car trailing smoke ahead of Bond's Torana which finished about 40 seconds behind.

In 1987, motoring writer Bill Tuckey in his book The Rise and Fall of Peter Brock claimed that there had been a lap scoring error in the 1976 race and that Colin Bond's Torana was the first car to complete the distance. Tuckey claimed Holden declined to challenge the result because a privately entered Holden team had won in such a memorable, emotional finish, and because Bob Morris' major sponsor was Ron Hodgson Motors, one of Sydney's leading Holden dealerships at the time. It remains however a contested footnote, Bob Morris denies that this was the case, claiming most team lap scorers agreed that the results were correct. Despite this, Bond's co-driver John Harvey believes that he and Bond did indeed win the race (Bond himself has kept a dignified silence), despite the official result still showing Morris and Fitzpatrick as race winners.

== 1-2 Formation Finish at Bathurst ==
After seven years with the Holden Dealer Team, Bond shocked the establishment in 1977 when he left the HDT and joined Allan Moffat's Ford Dealers Team. Bond came close to becoming the first driver to achieve victories for both Holden and Ford Motor Company at the Bathurst 1000 (a feat which wouldn't be achieved until Steven Richards in 1999). He was driving the second of Moffat's Ford XC Falcon GS500 Hardtop's, with Moffat driving the lead car which was experiencing mechanical problems in the closing laps of the race (Moffat's Falcon had run out of brakes after they were given a caning by his co-driver, ex-Formula One driver and multiple 24 Hours of Le Mans winner Jacky Ickx). Although Bond had the opportunity to pass Moffat and take victory, he controversially chose to observe Moffat's team orders and allowed him to pass the line first in the now famous 1-2 formation finish.

Bond has stated in interviews since then that he regretted not taking victory from Moffat. Moffat himself later revealed that during the race he had offered Bond a drive in his Falcon which would have seen Bond not only win the race but finish second as well. Bond confirmed that he turned down Moffat's offer, preferring instead to stick to his own car which was co-driven by open wheel driver Alan Hamilton (Bond was to have driven with Gregg Hansford, but the Queenslander had to withdraw through injury suffered in a Motorcycle racing accident). Moffat also claimed that had the third placed Peter Janson / Larry Perkins Holden LX Torana SS A9X Hatchback or the similar Torana of fourth placed Peter and Phil Brock been on the same lap (both Toranas were one lap down) and closing in on the pair that Bond would have been free to pass him for the win if it meant that the Moffat Ford Dealers team won the race.

From 1977 to 1980, Bond ran the Ford works rally team, with Greg Carr and Bond driving the very competitive BDA Escort. The highlight for the Ford team was Greg Carr winning the 1978 Australian Rally Championship.

== The 1980s ==
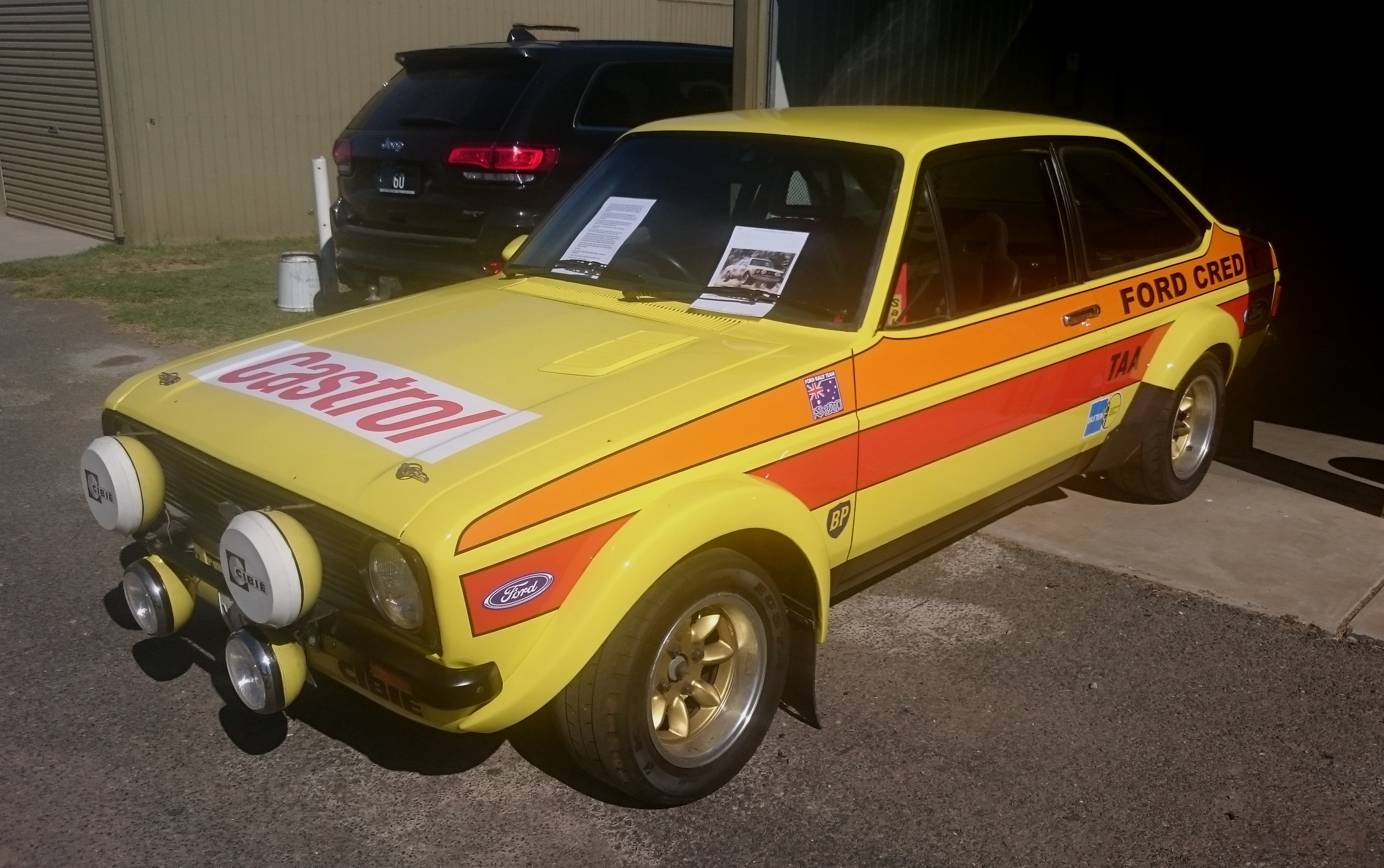
Bond placed second in the 1980 Australian Rally Championship driving this Ford Escort RS1800

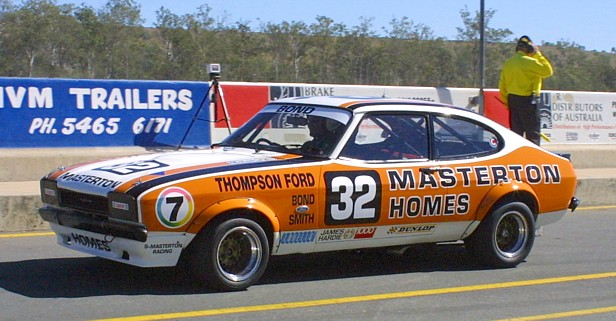
Bond placed third in the 1981 Australian Touring Car Championship driving a Ford Capri Mk.II

During the 1980s, Bond was less prominent than he had been the previous decade, due mainly as others recognised his engineering ability and he was hired to front smaller operations like Steve Masterton's Capri team, Alfa Romeo's three-year factory effort and in the 1990s Toyota's short-lived foray into Supertouring. But he did register two more Bathurst 1000 placings, finishing third in 1983 with Allan Grice in a Roadways Racing Holden VH Commodore SS, and 1988; the latter occasion with 1980 Formula One World Champion Alan Jones as co-driver in a Ford Sierra RS500. And in 1985, Bond and former motorcycle racer Gregg Hansford won their class and finished seventh outright at Bathurst in an Alfa Romeo GTV. He was also third in the 1981 and 1988 Australian Touring Car Championships, 1981 in a Ford Capri Mk.II for the Masterton Homes team and 1988 in a Ford Sierra RS500 in what was his first ATCC in an outright car since 1978.

Bond drove a great variety of machinery during this period including the Ford Capri, Chevrolet Camaro Z28, Triumph TR8, Alfa Romeo GTV, Alfa Romeo 75, Ford Sierra RS500, Toyota Corolla, and Porsche (including a Porsche 944 Turbo for Allan Hamilton's Porsche Cars Australia team in the 1982 and 1983 Australian GT Championships).

Bond also teamed with then open wheel racer Andrew Miedecke to drive a John Fitzpatrick Racing Porsche 962 in the 1984 Sandown 1000. The race, which was the final round of the 1984 World Endurance Championship, was the first ever FIA world championship motor race held in Australia. Driving an unfamiliar car with 650 bhp (485 kW; 659 PS) (approximately 200 bhp (149 kW; 203 PS) more than either had driven previously), Bond and Miedecke acquitted themselves well against the likes of Sports car racing stars Stefan Bellof, Jacky Ickx, Jochen Mass, Derek Bell, and Aussie internationals Alan Jones and Vern Schuppan. Bond qualified the car in 11th place, 4.4 seconds slower than pole winner Bellof in his Rothmans Porsche 956B. Bondy and "Mad Andy" then drove a steady race, staying out of trouble, to record a 6th-place finish at Melbourne's Sandown Park. Bond would claim that racing the 962 was "A lot of fun".

== Wins in the Caltex Sierra ==
Bond made an impact on the Touring Car Championship in 1990, winning two consecutive rounds of the championship at Lakeside and Mallala driving a Caltex sponsored Ford Sierra. Both these wins involved memorable drives where Bond came from behind to pass the leading cars one by one until taking the lead and holding off his rivals to win.

In 1994, Bond was lured back for one last tilt at the Bathurst 1000 by Fred Gibson, manager of the Winfield Racing Team. Driving a Holden VP Commodore with Swede Anders Olofsson, Bond briefly led the race early on when many cars were pitting to change tyres. He finished in sixth place on the same lap as the winning car.

Bond retired as a driver in 1994, but continued to contribute to the sport as a driving standards observer for V8 Supercar until he was replaced by Tomas Mezera after the 2006 season.

In the 1994 Queen's Birthday Honours, Bond was awarded the Medal of the Order of Australia (OAM) for service to motor sport.

== Career results ==
Season	Series	Position	Car	Team
1965	New South Wales Hillclimb Championship	1st	Lynx-Peugeot S/C	
1966	New South Wales Hillclimb Championship	1st	Lynx-Peugeot S/C	
1967	New South Wales Hillclimb Championship	1st	Lynx-Peugeot S/C	
1970	Tasman Touring Series	2nd	Holden HT Monaro GTS 350	Holden Dealer Team
1970	Australian Rally Championship	2nd	Holden HT Monaro GTS 350	Holden Dealer Team
1971	South Pacific Touring Series	1st	Holden LC Torana GTR XU-1	Holden Dealer Team
1971	Australian Touring Car Championship	10th	Holden LC Torana GTR XU-1	Holden Dealer Team
1971	Australian Rally Championship	1st	Holden LC Torana GTR XU-1	Holden Dealer Team
1972	South Pacific Touring Series	6th	Holden LJ Torana GTR XU-1	Holden Dealer Team
1972	Sun-7 Chesterfield Series	1st	Holden LJ Torana GTR XU-1	Holden Dealer Team
1972	Toby Lee Series	1st	Holden LJ Torana GTR XU-1	Holden Dealer Team
1972	Australian Rally Championship	1st	Holden LJ Torana GTR XU-1	Holden Dealer Team
1973	Australian Rally Championship	2nd	Holden LJ Torana GTR XU-1	Holden Dealer Team
1973	South Pacific Touring Series	3rd	Holden LJ Torana GTR XU-1	Holden Dealer Team
1973	Sun 7 Better Brakes Gold Medal Series	1st	Holden LJ Torana GTR XU-1	Holden Dealer Team
1973	Australian Touring Car Championship	11th	Holden LJ Torana GTR XU-1	Holden Dealer Team
1974	Australian Touring Car Championship	14th	Holden LJ Torana GTR XU-1	Holden Dealer Team
1974	Sun-7 Chesterfield Series	1st	Holden LJ Torana GTR XU-1; Holden LH Torana SL/R 5000	Holden Dealer Team
1974	Australian Rally Championship	1st	Holden LJ Torana GTR XU-1	Holden Dealer Team
1975	Australian Touring Car Championship	1st	Holden LH Torana SL/R 5000 L34	Holden Dealer Team
1975	South Pacific Touring Series	1st	Holden LH Torana SL/R 5000 L34	Holden Dealer Team
1975	Australian Rally Championship	4th	Holden LH Torana SL/R 5000 L34	Holden Dealer Team
1976	Australian Touring Car Championship	2nd	Holden LH Torana SL/R 5000 L34	Holden Dealer Team
1976	Australian Sports Sedan Championship	6th	Holden LH Torana	Holden Dealer Team
1977	Australian Touring Car Championship	2nd	Ford XB Falcon GT; Ford XC Falcon GS500 Hardtop	Moffat Ford Dealers
1978	Australian Rally Championship	3rd	Ford Escort BDA	Ford Australia
1978	Australian Touring Car Championship	5th	Ford XC Falcon GS500 Hardtop	Moffat Ford Dealers
1979	Rothmans International Series	6th	Brabham BT43 Chevrolet	Thomson Motor Auctions
1979	Australian Rally Championship	3rd	Ford Escort BDA	Ford Australia
1980	Australian Rally Championship	2nd	Ford Escort BDA	Ford Australia
1981	Australian Touring Car Championship	3rd	Ford Capri Mk.II	Masterton Homes Racing
1981	3.5L AMSCAR Series	3rd	Ford Capri Mk.II	Masterton Homes Racing
1982	Australian Touring Car Championship	17th	Ford Capri Mk.II	
1982	Australian GT Championship	3rd	Porsche 944 Turbo	Porsche Cars Australia
1982	Better Brakes AMSCAR Series	4th	Chevrolet Camaro Z28	Nine Network Racing Team
1983	Australian GT Championship	7th	Porsche 944 Turbo	Porsche Cars Australia
1984	Australian Super Series	4th	Alfa Romeo GTV6	Network Alfa
1984	World Endurance Championship	62nd	Porsche 962	Team Australia; John Fitzpatrick Racing
1985	Australian Touring Car Championship	6th	Alfa Romeo GTV6	Network Alfa
1985	Australian Endurance Championship	3rd	Alfa Romeo GTV6	Network Alfa
1986	Australian Touring Car Championship	9th	Alfa Romeo GTV6	Network Alfa
1986	Better Brakes AMSCAR Series	2nd	Alfa Romeo GTV6	Network Alfa
1986	Australian Endurance Championship	5th	Alfa Romeo GTV6	Network Alfa
1987	Australian Touring Car Championship	9th	Alfa Romeo 75	Caltex CXT Racing Team
1988	Australian Touring Car Championship	3rd	Ford Sierra RS500	Caltex CXT Racing Team
1988	Better Brakes AMSCAR Series	1st	Ford Sierra RS500	Caltex CXT Racing Team
1988	Asia-Pacific Touring Car Championship	2nd	Ford Sierra RS500	Caltex CXT Racing Team
1989	Australian Touring Car Championship	8th	Ford Sierra RS500	Caltex CXT Racing Team
1990	Australian Touring Car Championship	4th	Ford Sierra RS500	Caltex CXT Racing Team
1990	James Hardie Building Products AMSCAR Series	2nd	Ford Sierra RS500	Caltex CXT Racing Team
1990	Australian Endurance Championship	13th	Ford Sierra RS500	Caltex CXT Racing Team
1991	Australian Touring Car Championship	10th	Ford Sierra RS500	Caltex CXT Racing Team
1992	Australian Touring Car Championship	12th	Ford Sierra RS500	Caltex CXT Racing Team
1993	Australian Touring Car Championship	15th	Toyota Corolla Seca AE93	Caltex CXT Racing Team
1993	Australian 2.0 Litre Touring Car Championship	3rd	Toyota Corolla Seca AE93	Caltex CXT Racing Team

=== Complete Bathurst 500/1000 results ===
Year	Car#	Team	Co-drivers	Car	Class	Laps	Pos.	Class pos.
1965	32	(Australia) John Rhodin Pty ltd	(Australia) Arthur Treloar	Isuzu Bellett 1500	D	109	30th	6th
1966	40	(Australia) John Rhodin	(Australia) Arthur Treloar	Isuzu Bellett 1500	D	111	30th	8th
1969	44	(Australia) Holden Dealer Team	(Australia) Tony Roberts	Holden HT Monaro GTS350	D	130	1st	1st
1970	39	(Australia) Holden Dealer Team		Holden LC Torana GTR XU-1	C	119	16th	9th
1971	31	(Australia) Holden Dealer Team		Holden LC Torana GTR XU-1	D	129	4th	1st
1972	24	(Australia) Holden Dealer Team		Holden LJ Torana GTR XU-1	C	2	DNF	DNF
1973	24	(Australia) Holden Dealer Team	(Australia) Leo Geoghegan	Holden LJ Torana GTR XU-1	D	163	3rd	3rd
1974	2	(Australia) Holden Dealer Team	(Australia) Bob Skelton	Holden LH Torana SL/R 5000	3001 – 6000cc	156	4th	4th
1975	2	(Australia) Holden Dealer Team	(Australia) Johnnie Walker	Holden LH Torana SL/R 5000 L34	D	154	3rd	3rd
1976	1	(Australia) Holden Dealer Team	(Australia) John Harvey	Holden LH Torana SL/R 5000 L34	3001cc - 6000cc	163	2nd	2nd
1977	2	(Australia) Moffat Ford Dealers	(Australia) Alan Hamilton	Ford XC Falcon GS500 Hardtop	3001cc - 6000cc	163	2nd	2nd
1978	2	(Australia) Moffat Ford Dealers	(Australia) Fred Gibson	Ford XC Falcon Cobra	A	59	DNF	DNF
1979	4	(Australia) Thompson Ford	(Australia) John French	Ford XC Falcon GS500 Hardtop	A	23	DNF	DNF
1980	32	(Australia) Masterton Homes	(Australia) Steve Masterton	Ford Capri Mk.II	2001-3000cc	147	13th	2nd
1981	32	(Australia) Masterton Homes	(Australia) Don Smith	Ford Capri Mk.II	6 Cylinder & Rotary	113	8th	3rd
1982	9	(Australia) Nine Network Racing Team	(Australia) Kevin Bartlett	Chevrolet Camaro Z28	A	27	DNF	DNF
1983	6	(Australia) STP Roadways Racing	(Australia) Allan Grice	Holden VH Commodore SS	A	160	3rd	3rd
1984	70	(Australia) Network Alfa	(Australia) Alfredo Costanzo	Alfa Romeo GTV6	Group A	111	DNF	DNF
1985	47	(Australia) Network Alfa	(Australia) Gregg Hansford	Alfa Romeo GTV6	B	158	8th	1st
1986	75	(Australia) Network Alfa	(Australia) Peter Fitzgerald	Alfa Romeo GTV6	B	111	DNF	DNF
1987	57	(Australia) Caltex CXT Racing	(Australia) Lucio Cesario	Alfa Romeo 75	2	34	DNF	DNF
1988	4	(Australia) Caltex CXT Racing Team	(Australia) Alan Jones	Ford Sierra RS500	A	158	3rd	3rd
1989	4	(Australia) Caltex CXT Racing Team	(Australia) Bruce Stewart	Ford Sierra RS500	A	131	26th	21st
1990	8	(Australia) Caltex CXT Racing Team	(New Zealand) Graeme Crosby	Ford Sierra RS500	1	44	DNF	DNF
1991	8	(Australia) Caltex CXT Racing Team	(New Zealand) Graeme Crosby	Ford Sierra RS500	1	152	DNF	DNF
1992	8	(Australia) Caltex CXT Racing Team	(Australia) John Smith	Ford Sierra RS500	A	7	DNF	DNF
1993	8	(Australia) Caltex CXT Racing Team	(Australia) Terry Bosnjak	Toyota Corolla Seca	B	64	DNF	DNF
1994	6	(Australia) Winfield Racing	(Sweden) Anders Olofsson	Holden VP Commodore	A	161	6th	6th

=== Complete Sandown Endurance results ===
Year	Team	Co-drivers	Car	Class	Laps	Pos.	Class pos.
1970	(Australia) Holden Dealer Team		Holden LC Torana GTR XU-1	C	129	2nd	1st
1971	(Australia) Holden Dealer Team		Holden LC Torana GTR XU-1	C	130	1st	1st
1972	(Australia) Holden Dealer Team		Holden LJ Torana GTR XU-1	C	NA	DNF	DNF
1973	(Australia) Holden Dealer Team		Holden LJ Torana GTR XU-1	C	130	2nd	2nd
1974	(Australia) Holden Dealer Team		Holden LH Torana SL/R 5000	D	98	DNF	DNF
1975	(Australia) Holden Dealer Team		Holden LH Torana SL/R 5000 L34	A	128	7th	7th
1976	(Australia) Holden Dealer Team		Holden LH Torana SL/R 5000 L34	D	NA	DNF	DNF
1977	(Australia) Moffat Ford Dealers		Ford XC Falcon GS500 Hardtop	A	125	5th	5th
1978	(Australia) Moffat Ford Dealers		Ford XC Falcon Cobra	6000cc	NA	DNF	DNF
1979	(Australia) Thomson Ford		Ford XC Falcon GS500 Hardtop	A	NA	DNF	DNF
1980	(Australia) Masterton Homes	(Australia) Steve Masterton	Ford Capri Mk.II	B	89	17th	2nd
1981	(Australia) Masterton Homes Pty Ltd	(Australia) Steve Masterton	Ford Capri Mk.II	B	112	9th	1st
1982	(Australia) Nine Network Racing Team	(Australia) Kevin Bartlett	Chevrolet Camaro Z28	D	NA	DNF	DNF
1983	(Australia) STP Roadways Racing	(Australia) Allan Grice	Holden VH Commodore SS	Over 3000cc	NA	DNF	DNF
1984	(Australia) Network Alfa	(Australia) Peter Fitzgerald	Alfa Romeo GTV6	Group A	93	DNF	DNF
1985	(Australia) Network Alfa	(Australia) Gregg Hansford	Alfa Romeo GTV6	B	126	4th	2nd
1986	(Australia) Network Alfa	(Australia) Peter Fitzgerald	Alfa Romeo GTV6	A	120	15th	1st
1988	(Australia) Caltex CXT Race Team	(Australia) Alan Jones	Ford Sierra RS500	A	-	DNS	DNS
1989	(Australia) Caltex CXT Race Team	(Australia) Garry Rogers (Australia) Ken Matthews	Ford Sierra RS500	A	2	DNF	DNF
1993	(Australia) Caltex CXT Racing	(Australia) Terry Bosnjak	Toyota Corolla Seca	2 Litre	63	DNF	DNF
1994	(Australia) BP Mazda Motorsport	(Australia) Garry Waldon	Mazda RX-7	Prod.	140	16th	2nd

=== Complete 24 Hours of Le Mans results ===
Year	Team	Co-drivers	Car	Class	Laps	Pos.	Class pos.
1981	Porsche Cars Australia	(Australia) Peter Brock (New Zealand) Jim Richards	Porsche 924 Carrera GTR	GT	-	DNS	DNS

=== Complete Australian Touring Car Championship results ===
(key) (Races in bold indicate pole position) (Races in italics indicate fastest lap)

Year	Team	Car	1	2	3	4	5	6	7	8	9	10	11	12	13	14	15	16	17	18	DC	Points
1971	Holden Dealer Team	Holden LC Torana GTR	SYM	CAL	SAN; 5	SUR	MAL	LAK	ORA												10th	2
1972	Holden Dealer Team	Holden LJ Torana GTR XU-1	SYM	CAL	BAT; 10	SAN	AIR	WAR; 6	SUR	ORA											26th	2
1973	Holden Dealer Team	Holden LJ Torana GTR XU-1	SYM	CAL	SAN	WAN	SUR	AIR	ORA; 2	WAR											11th	9
1974	Holden Dealer Team	Holden LJ Torana GTR XU-1	SYM	CAL	SAN	SAN	AMA; 3	ORA	SUR	AIR											13th	6
1975	Holden Dealer Team	Holden LH Torana SL/R 5000 L34	SYM; 1	CAL; 3	AMA; Ret	ORA; 2	SUR; 3	SAN	AIR; 1	LAK; 1											1st	60
1976	Holden Dealer Team	Holden LH Torana SL/R 5000 L34	SYM; 2	CAL; 2	ORA; 3	ORA; 5	SAN; 1	AMA; Ret	AMA; DNS	AIR; 3	AIR; 3	LAK; 2	LAK; 1	SAN; Ret	AIR; 5	SUR; Ret	PHI; 1				2nd	72
1977	Moffat Ford Dealers	Ford XB Falcon GT Hardtop	SYM; 2	SYM; 2	CAL; 2	ORA; 8	AMA; 2	SAN; 2	AIR; 1	LAK; 2	SAN; 5	AIR; 2	SUR; Ret	PHI; 5							2nd	74
1978	Moffat Ford Dealers	Ford XC Falcon GS500 Hardtop	SYM; 4	ORA; 4	AMA; 4	SAN; DSQ	WAN	WAN	CAL	LAK; Ret	AIR; 1										5th	25
1980	Masterton Homes	Ford Capri Mk II	SYM	CAL	CAL	LAK	SAN	SAN	WAN	WAN	SUR	AIR	ORA; 5								19th	6
1981	Masterton Homes	Ford Capri Mk II	SYM; 6	CAL; 8	CAL; 7	LAK; 8	SAN; 9	SAN; 9	WAN; 6	AIR; 7	AIR; 7	SUR; 7	LAK								3rd	63
1982	Masterton Homes	Ford Capri Mk II	SAN	SAN	CAL	SYM	ORA; 6	LAK	WAN	AIR	SUR										17th	9
1985	Network Alfa	Alfa Romeo GTV6	WIN; Ret	SAN; 12	SYM; 8	WAN; 8	AIR; 6	CAL; 6	SUR; 16	LAK; 5	AMA; 4	ORA; 4									6th	127
1986	Network Alfa	Alfa Romeo GTV6	AMA; Ret	SYM	SAN; 4	AIR; 13	WAN; 8	SUR	CAL; 10	LAK	WIN; 5	ORA; Ret									9th	69
1987	Caltex CXT Racing	Alfa Romeo GTV6	CAL; 12	SYM; 11	LAK; 7	WAN; 9	AIR; 7	SUR; Ret	SAN; 21	AMA; Ret	ORA; 10										9th	36
1988	Caltex CXT Racing	Ford Sierra RS Cosworth	CAL; 3	SYM; 3	WIN; 2	WAN; 2	AIR; 3	LAK; Ret	SAN; Ret	AMA; 13	ORA; 4										3rd	76
1989	Caltex CXT Racing	Ford Sierra RS Cosworth	AMA; 11	SYM; 5	LAK; 9	WAN; 5	MAL; Ret	SAN; 6	WIN; Ret	ORA; 12											8th	23
1990	Caltex CXT Racing	Ford Sierra RS Cosworth	AMA; 9	SYM; 6	PHI; 4	WIN; 8	LAK; 1	MAL; 1	BAR; 3	ORA; 4											4th	81
1991	Caltex CXT Racing	Ford Sierra RS Cosworth	SAN; R1; 11	SYM; R2; 6	WAN; R3; 6	LAK; R4; 7	WIN; R5; 8	AMA; R6; 10	MAL; R7; 9	LAK; R8; 7	ORA; R9; Ret										10th	26
1992	Caltex CXT Racing	Ford Sierra RS Cosworth	AMA; R1	AMA; R2	SAN; R3	SAN; R4	SYM; R5	SYM; R6	WIN; R7	WIN; R8	LAK; R9	LAK; R10	EAS; R11	EAS; R12	MAL; R13	MAL; R14	BAR; R15	BAR; R16	ORA; R17	ORA; R18	12th	82
1993	Caltex CXT Racing	Toyota Corolla Seca AE93	AMA; R1	AMA; R2	SYM; R3	SYM; R4	PHI; R5	PHI; R6	LAK; R7	LAK; R8	WIN; R9	WIN; R10	EAS; R11	EAS; R12	MAL; R13	MAL; R14	BAR; R15	BAR; R16	ORA; R17	ORA; R18	15th	32

=== Complete World Endurance Championship results ===
(key) (Races in bold indicate pole position) (Races in italics indicate fastest lap)

Year	Team	Car	1	2	3	4	5	6	7	8	9	10	11	12	13	14	15	DC	Points
1981	Porsche Cars Australia	Porsche 924 Carrera GTR	DAY	SEB	MUG	MNZ	RIV	SIL	NUR	LMS; DNS	PUR	DAY	WAT	SPA	MOS	RAM	BRA	NC	0
1984	Team Australia (United Kingdom) John Fitzpatrick Racing	Porsche 962	MNZ	SIL	LeM	NUR	BRA	MOS	SPA	IMO	FJI	KYA	SAN; 6					62nd	6

=== Complete World Touring Car Championship results ===
(key) (Races in bold indicate pole position) (Races in italics indicate fastest lap)

Year	Team	Car	1	2	3	4	5	6	7	8	9	10	11	DC	Points
1987	(Australia) Caltex CXT Racing	Alfa Romeo 75	MNZ	JAR	DIJ	NUR	SPA	BNO	SIL	BAT; Ret	CLD	WEL	FJI	NC	0

† Not registered for series & points

=== Complete Asia-Pacific Touring Car Championship results ===
(key) (Races in bold indicate pole position) (Races in italics indicate fastest lap)

Year	Team	Car	1	2	3	4	5	6	7	8	9	10	11	12	DC	Points
1988	(Australia) **Caltex CXT Racing Team**	Ford Sierra RS500	BAT; 3	WEL; 4	PUK; Ret	FJI									2nd	49
1994	**Hyundai Australia**	Hyundai Lantra	FUJ; 1	FUJ; 2	MAC; 1 Ret	MAC; 2 Ret	SEN; 1 C	SEN; 2 C	WEL; 1	WEL; 2	CLD; 1 C	CLD; 2 C	CHE; 1 C	CHE; 2 C	NC	0

== Bibliography ==
- West, Luke (20 August 2021). The Immortals of Australian Motor Racing: The Local Heroes (Part of the 7-volume comprehensive sports collection). Immortals of Australian Sport (7-book series). Gelding Street Press. ISBN 978-1-925946-98-7.

Sporting positions
Preceded by Bruce McPhee; Barry Mulholland	Winner of the Bathurst 500; 1969 (with Tony Roberts)	Succeeded by Allan Moffat
Preceded by Bob Watson	Winner of the Australian Rally Championship; 1971 and 1972	Succeeded by Peter Lang
Preceded by Peter Lang	Winner of the Australian Rally Championship; 1974	Succeeded by Ross Dunkerton
Preceded by Peter Brock	Winner of the Australian Touring Car Championship; 1975	Succeeded by Allan Moffat
