= 1974 RE-PO 500K =

The 1974 RE-PO 500K was an endurance race for Group C Touring Cars. It was held at the Phillip Island Circuit in Victoria, Australia on 24 November 1974 over 106 laps, a race distance of 501 kilometres (311 mi). The race, which was the fifth round of the 1974 Australian Manufacturers' Championship, was the fourth annual "Phillip Island 500K".

The race was won by Holden Dealer Team driver Colin Bond driving a Holden Torana. Bond finishing a lap ahead of the Ford Falcon (XB) of Murray Carter. Brothers Rod and Russ McRae finished three laps behind Bond in a Holden Torana to take third.

== Class structure ==
Cars competed in four classes:

- Class A : Up 1300cc
- Class B : 1301–2000cc
- Class C : 2001 – 3000cc
- Class D : More than 3000cc

== Race results ==
Race results were as follows:

Position	Drivers	No.	Car	Entrant	Class	Laps
1	Colin Bond	2	Holden LH Torana SL/R 5000	Marlboro Holden Dealer Team	D	106
2	Murray Carter	18	Ford XB Falcon GT Hardtop	Murray Carter	D	105
3	Rod McRae; Russ McRae	28	Holden LH Torana SL/R 5000	Dustings of Burwood	D	105
4	Graeme Blanchard	16	Holden LJ Torana GTR XU-1	Insul Fluf Home Insulation	D	103
5	Stuart Saker	17	Holden LJ Torana GTR XU-1	Stuart Saker	D	101
6	Tony Farrell		Mazda RX-3	Mazda Racing Team	C	100
7	Kevin Kennedy	15	Holden LJ Torana GTR XU-1	Kevin Kennedy	D	99
8	Ray Gulson	48	Alfa Romeo GTV	Ray Gulson	B	99
9	Jim Murcott	49	Alfa Romeo GTV	AF & M Beninca	B	99
10	Mel Mollison	42	Mazda RX-3	Bainbridge Motors	B	98
11	Matt Phillip	37	Holden Torana GTR	Mollison Motors	C	96
12	Bill Evans	58	Datsun 1200 Coupe	Datsun Racing Team	A	94
13	Brian Ovenden	21	Chrysler Valiant Charger R/T	Brian Ovenden	D	94
14	Stewart McLeod		Datsun 240K	Datsun Racing Team	C	93
15	Colin Campbell	44	Ford Escort Twin Cam	Alan Coffey Motors of Dandenong	B	93
16	Ken Brian	63	Honda Civic	Auto Village - Nowra	A	92
17	Gary Toepfer	64	Toyota Corolla	G Toepfer	A	88
18	Gary Rowe	45	Ford Escort Twin Cam	Peter Mac's Towing Pty Ltd	B	87
19	Max McClure		Mazda RX-3		B	84
20	Max McGinley	65	Honda Civic	Max McGinley	A	82
21	Geoff Wade	46	Ford Escort Twin Cam	Peter Mac's Towing Pty Ltd	B	78
DNF	Dave Clement	53	Morris Cooper S	Clement Motors	A	
DNF	Cam Richardson	11	Holden LJ Torana GTR XU-1	Richardson Engine Reconditioning	D	83
DNF	John Bundy	57	Morris Cooper S	JF Bundy	A	72
DNF	Robin Dudfield	59	Alfa Romeo Junior	Victorian Police Motor Sport Club	A	
DNF	Lawrie Nelson	19	Chrysler Valiant Charger R/T	Lawrie Nelson	D	61?
DNF	John Stoopman	14	Holden LJ Torana GTR XU-1	Bayside Holden	D	51
DNF	Peter Brock	1	Holden LH Torana SL/R 5000	Marlboro Holden Dealer Team	D	
DNF	Peter Janson	4	Holden LH Torana SL/R 5000	P Janson	D	
DNF	Allan Moffat	33	Ford XB Falcon GT Hardtop	Allan Moffat Racing	D	35
DNF	Robert Bride	9	Holden LJ Torana GTR XU-1	Torana Club of Victoria	D	
DNF	Bernie McClure	25	Holden LH Torana SL/R 5000	Bendigo Motor Co	D	
?	Geoff Newton	32	Ford Capri V6	Geoff Newton	C	
Excl	Nick Louis		Mazda RX-3	Kernan Motors (Mazda) Flemington	C	95

Note:

- The Mazda RX-3 of Tony Farrell was excluded from the results due to a modification to the half shafts. An appeal was successful and the car was re-instated.
