= 1974 Australian Manufacturers' Championship =

The 1974 Australian Manufacturers' Championship was an Australian motor racing competition for Group C Touring Cars. It was authorised by Confederation of Australian Motor Sport as an Australian National Title.

The championship, which was the fourth Australian Manufacturers' Championship, was won by Holden.

== Calendar ==
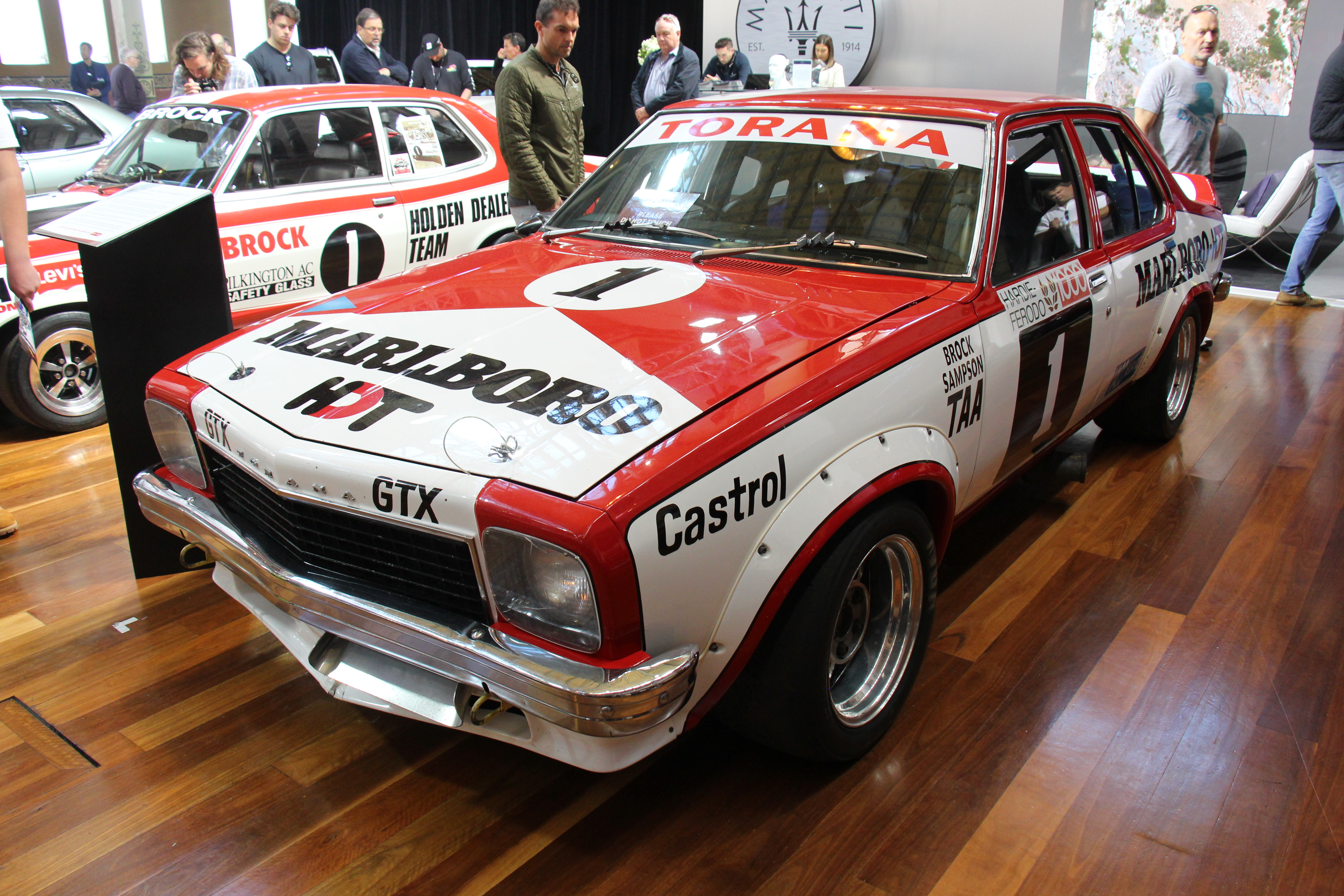
Holden won the championship, with the Torana SL/R 5000 L34 model being its main pointscorer. The example above contested the Bathurst round of the 1974 championship

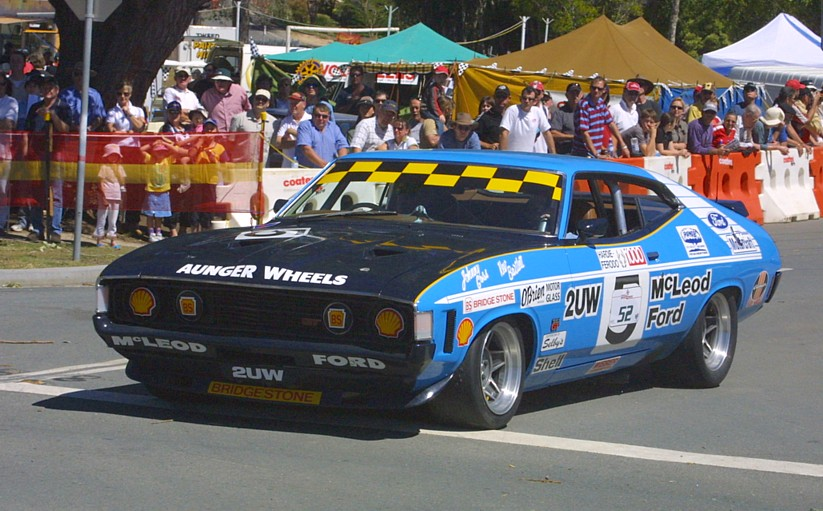
A reproduction of the Ford XA Falcon GT Hardtop with which John Goss & Kevin Bartlett won the Bathurst round of the championship

The championship was contested over a five round series with each round being a single race staged over a minimum distance of 250 km.

Round	Race title	Circuit	State	Date	Winning driver(s)	Winning car	Entrant	Report
1	Chesterfield 250	Adelaide International Raceway	South Australia	25 August	(Australia) Colin Bond	Holden LH Torana SL/R 5000	Holden Dealer Team	
2	Sandown 250	Sandown Park	Victoria	8 September	(Canada) Allan Moffat	Ford XB Falcon GT Hardtop	Allan Moffat Racing	Report
3	Hardie-Ferodo 1000	Mount Panorama, Bathurst	New South Wales	6 October	(Australia) John Goss (Australia) Kevin Bartlett	Ford XA Falcon GT Hardtop	McLeod Ford-2UW	Report
4	Chesterfield 300	Surfers Paradise	Queensland	10 November	(Australia) Colin Bond	Holden LH Torana SL/R 5000	Holden Dealer Team	
5	RE-PO 500K	Phillip Island	Victoria	24 November	(Australia) Colin Bond	Holden LH Torana SL/R 5000	Holden Dealer Team	Report

== Class Structure ==
Cars competed in four engine capacity classes.

- Up to and including 1300 cc
- 1301 to 2000 cc
- 2001 to 3000 cc
- Over 3000 cc

== Points system ==
For all rounds except the Bathurst round, championship points were awarded on a 9-8-7-6-5-4-3-2-1 basis for the first nine positions in each class plus 4-3-2-1 for the first four positions outright. For the Bathurst round only, championship points were awarded on an 18-16-14-12-10-8-6-4-2 basis for the first nine positions in each class plus 4-3-2-1 for the first four positions outright. Only the best placed car from each manufacturer was eligible to score points.

== Results ==
Position	Manufacturer	Ade.	San.	Bat.	Sur.	Phi.	Total.
1	Holden	13	11	15	13	13	65
2	Ford	11	13	22	4	9	59
3	Mazda	11	9	18	9	9	56
4	Alfa Romeo	9	9	18	9	9	54
5	Leyland	7	8	18	6	-	39
=	Datsun	9	9	12	-	9	39
7	Honda	8	6	12	4	6	36
8	Chrysler	-	6	-	-	-	6
