= 1976 Australian Sports Sedan Championship =

Motor racing competition

The 1976 Australian Sports Sedan Championship was a CAMS sanctioned Australian motor racing title open to Group B Sports Sedans. The title, which was the inaugural Australian Sports Sedan Championship, was won by Allan Moffat, driving a Chevrolet Monza and a Ford Capri RS3100.

== Calendar ==
The championship was contested over a seven-round series with two heats per round.

Round	Name	Circuit	Date	Winning driver	Car
1		Surfers Paradise International Raceway	16 May	Allan Moffat	Chevrolet Monza
2	The Marlboro Cup	Sandown Park	4 July	Allan Moffat	Chevrolet Monza
3		Oran Park	1 August	Tony Edmondson	Chrysler Valiant Charger
4		Wanneroo Park	15 August	Allan Moffat	Ford Capri RS3100
5	The Advertiser Trophy	Adelaide International Raceway	22 August	Frank Gardner	Chevrolet Corvair
6		Symmons Plains	26 September	Frank Gardner	Chevrolet Corvair
7		Calder	5 December	Frank Gardner	Chevrolet Corvair

== Points system ==
Championship points were awarded on a 9-6-4-3-2-1 basis to the six best placed drivers at each round.

== Results ==
Position	Driver	Car	Entrant	Sur	San	Ora	Wan	Ade	Sym	Cal	Total
1	Allan Moffat	Chevrolet Monza; Ford Capri RS3100	Allan Moffat Racing	9	9	2	9	4	-	-	33
2	Frank Gardner	Chevrolet Corvair	John Player Racing	-	-	-	-	9	9	9	27
3	Tony Edmondson	Chrysler VJ Valiant Charger Repco-Holden	Donald Elliott	6	-	9	-	-	6	-	21
4	Jim Richards	Ford Mustang	Sidchrome	-	3	-	6	6	-	3	18
5	Ian Diffen	Holden LJ Torana Chevrolet	World of Tyres	3	-	-	4	3	-	4	14
6	Ian Geoghegan	Holden HQ Monaro GTS 350	Craven Mild Racing	-	6	-	-	2	-	-	8
6	Colin Bond	Holden LH Torana Repco-Holden	Holden Dealer Team	-	4	4	-	-	-	-	8
8	Brian Potts	Holden Torana GTR XU-1		-	1	6	-	-	-	-	7
9	Bob Jane	Holden HQ Monaro GTS 350	Bob Jane T Marts	-	-	-	-	-	-	6	6
10	Garry Rogers	Ford Escort	Garry Rogers	2	-	3	-	-	-	-	5
11	Pat Crea	Ford TC Cortina	Pat Crea's Volkspares	-	-	-	-	-	4	-	4
11	Grant Walker	Ford Capri RS	Grant Walker	4	-	-	-	-	-	-	4
11	Vince Gregory	Volkswagen 1600TS Chevrolet	Gregory Racing	-	-	-	-	1	3	-	4
14	Brian Smith	Holden Torana		-	-	-	3	-	-	-	3
15	Stuart Beechen	Holden Torana GTR XU-1		-	-	-	2	-	-	-	2
15	Peter Wells	Vauxhall Viva		-	-	-	-	-	2	-	2
15	Ron Harrop	Holden EH Repco-Holden	Ron Harrop	-	2	-	-	-	-	-	2
15	John Pollard	Chevrolet Camaro	John Pollard	-	-	-	-	-	-	2	2
19	Ed Conacher	Holden Torana GTR XU-1		-	-	-	-	-	1	-	1
19	Bruce Peacock	Ford Anglia		-	-	-	1	-	-	-	1
19	Lyndon Arnel	Holden Torana		-	-	1	-	-	-	-	1
19	Doug Clark	Toyota Celica TA22	Brian Hilton	1	-	-	-	-	-	-	1
19	Don Halliday	Ford Capri	Halliday Racing (NZ)	-	-	-	-	-	-	1	1
