= 1974 Hardie-Ferodo 1000 =

Motor race in Australia

Seasons
- ← 1973 1975 →

Layout of the Mount Panorama Circuit (1938-1986)

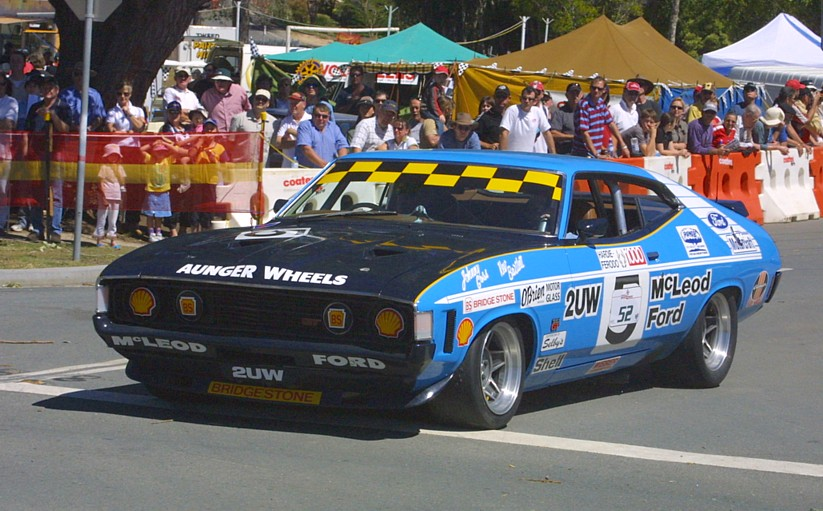
John Goss's reproduction of the winning Ford XA Falcon GT

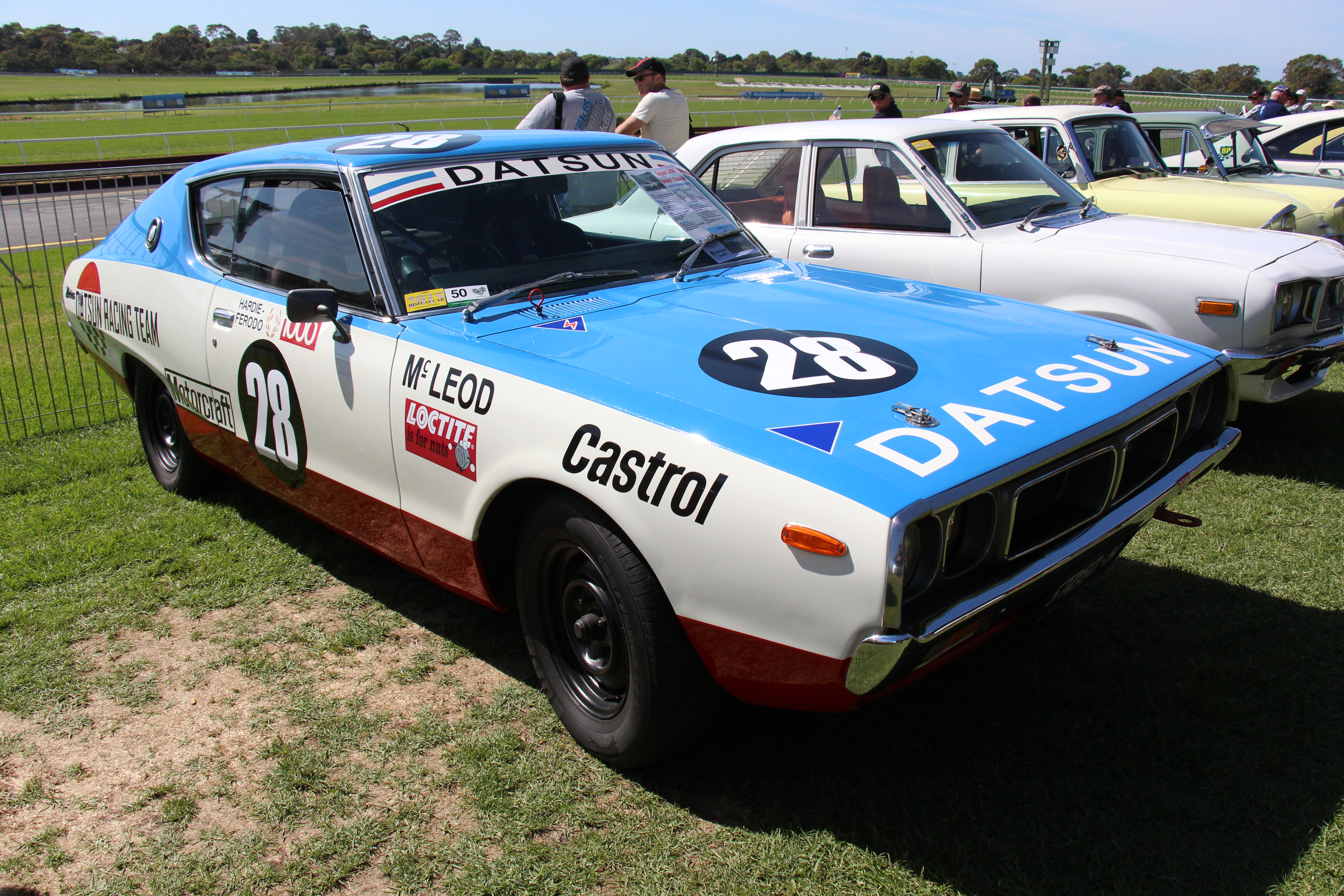
The Datsun 240K in which Stewart McLeod and Doug Whiteford placed seventh. The car is pictured in 2015.

The 1974 Hardie-Ferodo 1000 was an endurance race for Group C Touring Cars, held at the Mount Panorama Circuit near Bathurst in New South Wales, Australia on 6 October 1974. The race was Round 3 of the 1974 Australian Manufacturers' Championship and was the 15th in a sequence of annual “Bathurst 1000” races commencing with the 1960 Armstrong 500.

The wettest race in the event's history to that time saw John Goss and Kevin Bartlett take victory in a Ford Falcon GT under pressure in the late stages from the Holden Torana SL/R 5000 L34 of Bob Forbes and Wayne Negus. New Zealand drivers Jim Richards and Rod Coppins finished third, five laps down in another Holden Torana SL/R 5000 L34. 1974 marked what was the longest running in the race's history at the time, at 7h 50m 59.01s. This record stood until the 2014 race, which ran for 7h 58m 53.20s.

The No.1 Holden Dealer Team Torana of pole winner Peter Brock and Brian Sampson dominated the first two-thirds of the race and had built up a 6 lap lead over the field until their race was ended on lap 118. The expected challenge from defending race winner Allan Moffat and his co-driver, 1971 European Touring Car Champion Dieter Glemser in their Ford XB Falcon was in trouble early. Moffat, who had easily won the Sandown 250 a month earlier, only qualified in 15th place and after numerous engine and gearbox problems, the Falcon was retired after 92 laps with engine failure.

== Class structure ==
Cars competed in four engine capacity classes.

=== Up to 1300cc ===
The Up to 1300cc class was contested by Alfa Romeo GT 1300 Junior, Datsun 1200, Ford Escort, Honda Civic, Mazda 1300, Morris Cooper S and Morris Clubman GT.

=== 1301 – 2000cc ===
The 1301 – 2000cc class was contested by Alfa Romeo Alfetta, Alfa Romeo 2000 GTV, Datsun 180B, Ford Escort, 10A-engined Mazda RX-3 and Volkswagen Passat.

=== 2001 – 3000cc ===
The 2001 – 3000cc class was contested by BMW 3.0Si, Datsun 240K, Ford Capri, Holden Torana, Leyland Marina and 12A-engined Mazda RX-3.

=== 3001 – 6000cc ===
The 3001 – 6000cc class was contested by Ford Falcon, Holden Monaro and Holden Torana.

== Top 10 Qualifiers ==
Pos	No	Entrant	Driver	Car	Qual
Pole	1	Holden Dealer Team	(Australia) Peter Brock	Holden LH Torana SL/R 5000 L34	2:30.8
2	2	Holden Dealer Team	(Australia) Colin Bond	Holden LH Torana SL/R 5000 L34	2:31.6
3	5	McLeod Ford – 2UW	(Australia) John Goss	Ford XA Falcon GT Hardtop	2:35.9
4	3	Bob Jane Racing	(Australia) Bob Jane	Holden LH Torana SL/R 5000 L34	2:36.1
5	12	Norman G Booth Pty Ltd	(Australia) John Harvey	Holden LH Torana SL/R 5000 L34	2:37.6
6	6	Suttons Motors (Arncliffe) Pty Ltd	(Australia) Don Holland	Holden LH Torana SL/R 5000 L34	2:38.2
7	21	WD & HO Wills (Aust) Ltd	(Australia) Allan Grice	Holden LH Torana SL/R 5000 L34	2:39.5
8	9	R Coppins	(New Zealand) Jim Richards	Holden LH Torana SL/R 5000 L34	2:41.5
9	11	Barry Nixon-Smith	(Australia) Barry Nixon-Smith	Holden LJ Torana GTR XU-1	2:41.6
10	7	Ron Hodgson Motors	(Australia) Bob Morris	Holden LJ Torana GTR XU-1	2:42.1

== Results ==
Pos.	Class	No.	Entrant	Drivers	Car	Laps	Qual Pos.
1	3001 – 6000cc	5	McLeod Ford – 2UW	(Australia) John Goss (Australia) Kevin Bartlett	Ford XA Falcon GT Hardtop	163	3
2	3001 – 6000cc	4	Bob Forbes	(Australia) Bob Forbes (Australia) Wayne Negus	Holden LH Torana SL/R 5000 L34	163	11
3	3001 – 6000cc	9	R Coppins	(New Zealand) Jim Richards (New Zealand) Rod Coppins	Holden LH Torana SL/R 5000 L34	158	8
4	3001 – 6000cc	2	Holden Dealer Team	(Australia) Colin Bond (Australia) Bob Skelton	Holden LH Torana SL/R 5000 L34	156	2
5	3001 – 6000cc	14	Graeme Adams – Shell Racing	(Australia) Graeme Adams (Australia) Bob Stevens	Holden LJ Torana GTR XU-1	155	13
6	2001 – 3000cc	30	Mazda Racing Team	(Australia) Tony Farrell (Australia) Brian Reed	Mazda RX-3	152	24
7	2001 – 3000cc	28	Datsun Racing Team	(Australia) Stewart McLeod (Australia) Doug Whiteford	Datsun 240K	152	30
8	2001 – 3000cc	31	WA Fisher (Holdings) Pty Ltd	(Australia) Bernie Haehnle (Australia) Geoff Brabham	Mazda RX-3	151	23
9	1301 – 2000cc	39	Ray Gulson	(Australia) Ray Gulson (Australia) David Crowther	Alfa Romeo 2000 GTV	151	27
10	1301 – 2000cc	42	Bainbridge Motors	(Australia) Mel Mollison (Australia) Bruce Hindhaugh	Mazda RX-3	150	34
11	3001 – 6000cc	22	Bayside Holden	(Australia) John Stoopman (Australia) Dennis Martin	Holden LJ Torana GTR XU-1	150	18
12	1301 – 2000cc	48	Torque	(Australia) Brian Foley (Australia) Peter Wherrett	Alfa Romeo Alfetta	150	37
13	2001 – 3000cc	35	Kernal Motors (Mazda) Flemington	(Australia) Ted Brewster (Australia) Nick Louis	Mazda RX-3	149	31
14	1301 – 2000cc	44	Bob Holden Motors – Shell Racing	(Australia) Geoff Leeds (Australia) Peter Finlay	Ford Escort Twin Cam Mk.I	147	36
15	2001 – 3000cc	27	Mollison Motors Pty Ltd	(Australia) Roger Bonhomme (Australia) Bob Watson	Holden LC Torana GTR	146	32
16	1301 – 2000cc	47	Klosters Pty Ltd	(Australia) Jim Sullivan (Australia) Ian White	Ford Escort Twin Cam Mk.I	143	48
17	Up to 1300cc	57	G Leggatt	(Australia) Gary Leggatt (Australia) Peter Lander	Morris Cooper S	142	35
18	Up to 1300cc	63	Auto Village – Nowra	(Australia) Ken Brian (Australia) Noel Riley	Honda Civic	142	55
19	Up to 1300cc	60	Fred's Treds Pty Ltd	(Australia) Ron Gillard (Australia) Gordon Rich	Alfa Romeo GT 1300 Junior	140	54
20	Up to 1300cc	59	Clement Motors	(Australia) David Clement (Australia) Neil Mason	Morris Cooper S	140	47
21	3001 – 6000cc	10	Niel West Motors	(Australia) Neil West (Australia) Peter Harding	Holden LJ Torana GTR XU-1	138	22
22	Up to 1300cc	61	Honda Australia Pty Ltd	(Australia) Max McGinley (Australia) Ray Harrison	Honda Civic	135	57
23	3001 – 6000cc	8	Darrell Lea Chocolate Shops Pty Ltd	(Australia) Ron Dickson (Australia) Pat Crea	Holden HQ Monaro GTS 350	130	17
24	Up to 1300cc	68	Bob Williamson Motors	(Australia) Chick Audsley (Australia) Bob Williamson	Morris Cooper S	128	53
25	1301 – 2000cc	34	St George Port Hacking Auto Club	(Australia) Peter Molesworth (Australia) Neil Byers	Leyland Marina	125	59
26	Up to 1300cc	55	Ian Cook – Paul Gulson	(Australia) Ian Cook (Australia) Paul Gulson	Alfa Romeo GT 1300 Junior	121	58
DNF	3001 – 6000cc	20	Dustings of Burwood	(Australia) Rod McRae (Australia) Russ McRae	Holden LH Torana SL/R 5000 L34	146	43
DNF	1301 – 2000cc	51	WH Motors Pty Ltd	(Australia) Bruce Stewart (Australia) George Garth	Datsun 180B SSS	143	44
DNF	1301 – 2000cc	40	Somewhere Estates	(Australia) Alan Cant (Australia) George Morrell	Ford Escort Twin Cam Mk.I	137	33
DNF	3001 – 6000cc	6	Suttons Motors (Arncliffe) Pty Ltd	(Australia) Don Holland (Australia) Max Stewart	Holden LH Torana SL/R 5000 L34	134	6
DNF	Up to 1300cc	56	James Mason Motors Pty Ltd	(Australia) Lynn Brown (Australia) Paul Hamilton	Mazda 1300	124	56
DNF	3001 – 6000cc	1	Holden Dealer Team	(Australia) Peter Brock (Australia) Brian Sampson	Holden LH Torana SL/R 5000 L34	118	1
DNF	2001 – 3000cc	29	John Palmer Motors	(Australia) Gary Cooke (Australia) Bob Beasely	Mazda RX-3	110	26
DNF	Up to 1300cc	69	Victoria Police Motor Sport Club	(Australia) Robin Dudfield (Australia) Gary Keen	Alfa Romeo GT 1300 Junior	105	60
DNF	Up to 1300cc	54	Lordco (Australia) Pty Ltd	(Australia) John Lord (Australia) Ray Molloy	Morris Cooper S	104	40
DNF	1301 – 2000cc	50	Orange City Motors	(Australia) David Seldon (Australia) Peter Webster	Volkswagen Passat TS	101	45
DNF	Up to 1300cc	67	SL Driving School	(Australia) Jim Stewart (Australia) John Byers	Morris Clubman GT	100	49
DNF	3001 – 6000cc	33	Allan Moffat Racing	(Canada) Allan Moffat (West Germany) Dieter Glemser	Ford XB Falcon GT Hardtop	92	15
DNF	Up to 1300cc	66	Mini Bits	(Australia) John Dellaca (Australia) Terry Wade	Morris Cooper S	91	52
DNF	3001 – 6000cc	18	Murray Carter	(Australia) Murray Carter (Australia) Mike Stillwell	Ford XB Falcon GT Hardtop	88	20
DNF	3001 – 6000cc	19	Garry and Warren Smith	(Australia) John Pollard (Australia) Denis Gallagher	Holden LH Torana SL/R 5000 L34	85	16
DNF	3001 – 6000cc	16	Insulfluf Home Insulation	(Australia) Graeme Blanchard (Australia) Ken Hastings	Holden LJ Torana GTR XU-1	77	12
DNF	3001 – 6000cc	17	William Nitschke	(Australia) Bill Nitschke (Australia) John Lewis	Holden LJ Torana GTR XU-1	76	14
DNF	1301 – 2000cc	43	John French Pty Ltd	(Australia) John French (Australia) Dick Johnson	Alfa Romeo 2000 GTV	71	21
DNF	3001 – 6000cc	11	Barry Nixon-Smith	(Australia) Barry Nixon-Smith (Australia) Denis Geary	Holden LJ Torana GTR XU-1	71	9
DNF	Up to 1300cc	58	Ken Harrison – Shell Racing	(Australia) Bob Holden (Australia) Lyndon Arnel	Ford Escort GT1300 Mk.I	68	46
DNF	3001 – 6000cc	7	Ron Hodgson Motors	(Australia) Bob Morris (Australia) John Leffler	Holden LJ Torana GTR XU-1	63	10
DNF	Up to 1300cc	62	Datsun Racing Team	(Australia) James Laing-Peach (Australia) Bill Evans	Datsun 1200	59	50
DNF	2001 – 3000cc	26	WH Motors Pty Ltd	(Australia) Barry Seton (Australia) Don Smith	Holden LC Torana GTR	56	28
DNF	Up to 1300cc	41	Peter Brown	(Australia) Peter Brown (Australia) Graham Ritter	Alfa Romeo 2000 GTV	54	25
DNF	1301 – 2000cc	46	Formula 1 Europa Garage	(Australia) Tony Allen (Australia) Lakis Manticas	Alfa Romeo Alfetta	37	41
DNF	2001 – 3000cc	25	Geoff Perry	(Australia) Geoff Perry (Australia) Fred Sutherland	BMW 3.0 Si	29	42
DNF	2001 – 3000cc	32	Geoff Newton	(Australia) Geoff Newton (Australia) Bill Davis	Ford Capri V6 Mk.I	29	38
DNF	3001 – 6000cc	21	WD & HO Wills (Aust) Ltd	(Australia) Allan Grice (Australia) Graham Moore	Holden LH Torana SL/R 5000 L34	19	7
DNF	3001 – 6000cc	13	Les Grose	(Australia) Bruce McPhee (Australia) Les Grose	Holden LH Torana SL/R 5000 L34	19	39
DNF	3001 – 6000cc	15	Kevin Kennedy	(Australia) Kevin Kennedy (Australia) Steve Land	Holden LJ Torana GTR XU-1	13	19
DNF	3001 – 6000cc	3	Bob Jane Racing	(Australia) Bob Jane (Australia) Frank Gardner	Holden LH Torana SL/R 5000 L34	7	4
DNF	3001 – 6000cc	12	Norman G Booth Pty Ltd	(Australia) Jim Hunter (Australia) John Harvey	Holden LH Torana SL/R 5000 L34	5	5
DNF	1301 – 2000cc	45	Peter Mac's Towing Pty Ltd	(Australia) Geoff Wade (Australia) Roger Mahoney	Ford Escort Twin Cam Mk.I	1	51
DSQ	1301 – 2000cc	49	AF & M Beninca Pty Ltd	(Australia) Jim Murcott (Australia) Mal Robertson	Alfa Romeo 2000 GTV	153	29
DNS	3001 – 6000cc	23	Taylor's College Racing	(United Kingdom) Peter Janson (Australia) Paul Feltham	Holden LH Torana SL/R 5000 L34		
DNS	2001 – 3000cc	36	Simpson Motors	(Australia) John Wharton (Australia) John English	Mazda RX-3		
DNS	1301 – 2000cc	38	Bryan Byrt Ford Pty Ltd	(Australia) John Stevens (Australia) Peter Wells	Ford Escort GT1600 Mk.I		
DNS	1301 – 2000cc	52	WD Electrics	(Australia) Warren Thomson (Australia) Richard Matthews	Alfa Romeo 2000 GTV		
DNS	1301 – 2000cc	53	G Baglee	(Australia) Gary Baglee (Australia) David Condon	Chrysler Valiant Galant GL		
DNS	Up to 1300cc	64	David Montgomery Motors Pty Ltd	(Australia) Terry Shiel (Australia) Tony Mulvihill	Mazda 1300		

== Statistics ==
- Pole Position – No.1 Peter Brock – 2:30.8
- Fastest Lap – No.1 Peter Brock – 2:29.8 (Average Speed 128 km/h) (lap record)
- Race time for winning car – 7:51:43
