= 1970 Rothmans 250 Production Classic =

Coordinates: 28°0′59″S 153°22′34″E

The 1970 Rothmans 250 Production Classic was an endurance motor race for Series Production Touring Cars staged at the Surfers Paradise International Raceway in Queensland, Australia on 1 November 1970. Race distance was 125 laps of the 2 mile circuit, a total of 250 miles.

The race was won by Allan Moffat driving a Ford Falcon GTHO.

== Classes ==
Cars competed in four classes based on purchase price.

== Results ==
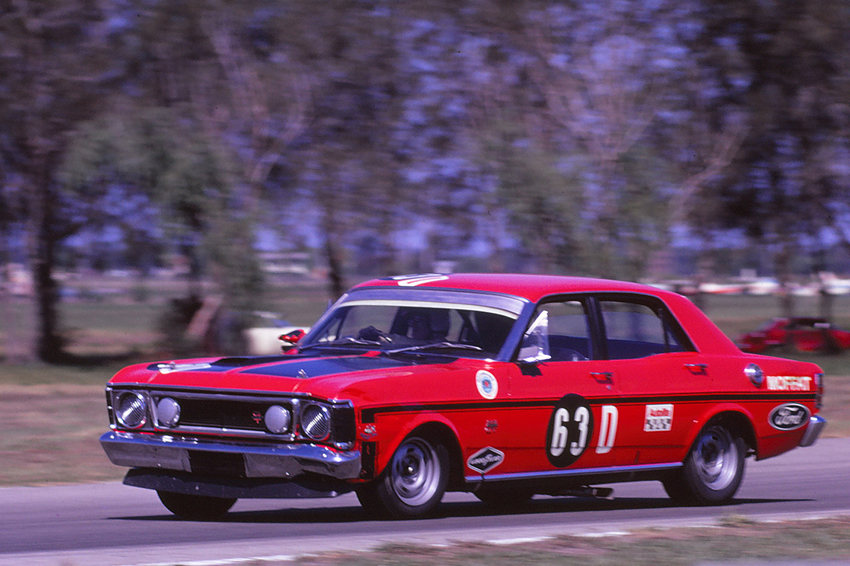
Allan Moffat won the race driving a Ford Falcon GTHO

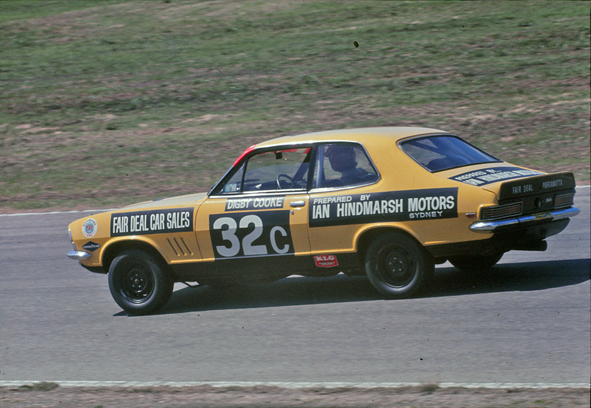
Peter Brock and Digby Cooke placed second driving a Holden Torana GTR XU-1

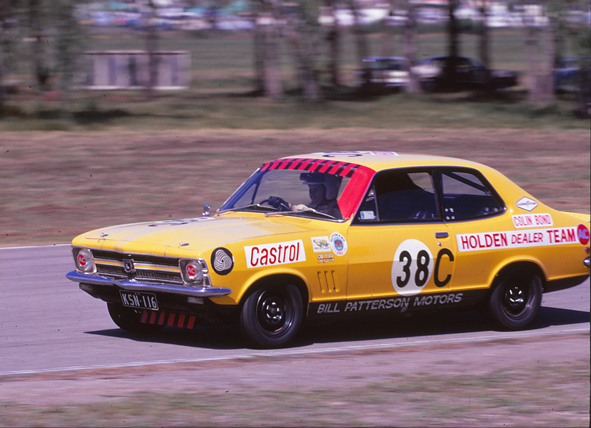
Colin Bond placed fifth driving a Holden Torana GTR XU-1

Position	Drivers	No.	Car	Entrant	Laps
1	Allan Moffat	63	Ford Falcon XW GTHO	Ford Motor Company	125
2	Peter Brock, Digby Cooke	32	Holden Torana LC GTR XU-1	Fair Deal Car Sales	125
3	Bruce McPhee		Ford Falcon XW GTHO	Ford Motor Company	124
4	Bob Morris, Lakis Manticas		Holden Torana LC GTR XU-1	Lakis Manticas	124
5	Colin Bond	38	Holden Torana LC GTR XU-1	Holden Dealer Team	124
6	Paul Zacka, Graham Perry		Holden Torana LC GTR XU-1	New Formula Motors	122
7	John French, J. Bertram		Ford Falcon XW GTHO	McClusky Ford P/L	122
8	Christine Cole	39	Holden Torana LC GTR XU-1	Holden Dealer Team	121
9	Bob Holden		Ford Falcon XW GTHO	Alto Ford	119
10	Doug Whiteford	20	Datsun 1600	Datsun Racing Team	115
	Class A				
1	John Leffler	12	Mazda 1300	John Palmer Motors	112
2	Barry Tapsall		Datsun 1200	Datsun Racing Team	112
3	G. Leeds, L. Carne		Mazda 1300	Tynan Motors	110
4	Bill Stanley		Toyota Corolla 1200		108
5	P. Granger, K. Merz		Toyota Corolla 1200		107
6	J. Leighton	5	Datsun 1200	Datsun Racing Team	103
	Class B				
1	Doug Whiteford	20	Datsun 1600	Datsun Racing Team	115
2	Bruce Stewart	24	Datsun 1600	WH Motors P/L	115
3	L. Massey, J. Massey		Datsun 1600	WH Motors P/L	107
4	D. Jemison, D. Booty		Datsun 1600	WH Motors P/L	103
	Class C				
1	Peter Brock, Digby Cooke	32	Holden Torana LC GTR XU-1	Fair Deal Car Sales	125
2	Bob Morris, Lakis Manticas		Holden Torana LC GTR XU-1	Lakis Manticas	124
3	Colin Bond	38	Holden Torana LC GTR XU-1	Holden Dealer Team	124
4	Paul Zacka, Graham Perry		Holden Torana LC GTR XU-1	New Formula Motors	122
5	Christine Cole	39	Holden Torana LC GTR XU-1	Holden Dealer Team	121
6	S. Townsend, C. Wenzel		Ford Escort Twin Cam		112
7	G. Giesberts. C. Clough		Holden Torana LC GTR XU-1		102
8	L. Arnel, T. Kucks		Ford Escort Twin Cam		99
	Class D				
1	Allan Moffat	63	Ford Falcon XW GTHO	Ford Motor Company	125
2	Bruce McPhee	64	Ford Falcon XW GTHO	Ford Motor Company	124
3	John French, J. Bertram		Ford Falcon XW GTHO	McClusky Ford P/L	122
4	Bob Holden		Ford Falcon XW GTHO	Alto Ford	119
5	Keith Self		Ford Falcon XW GTHO Automatic		112
6	J. English, Harris		Ford Capri V6		107
?	Leo Geoghegan, Tony Paul		Chrysler Valiant Pacer		?
?	Bob Skelton		Ford Falcon XW GTHO		?
?	Whitchurch		Chrysler Valiant Pacer		?
DNF	Phil Barnes		Ford Falcon XW GTHO		?
DNF	Trevor Meehan		Ford Falcon XW GTHO		?

=== Notes ===
- Attendance: 8,000
- Starters: 29
