= Allan Moffat =

Canadian and Australian racing driver (1939–2025)

Allan Moffat OBE
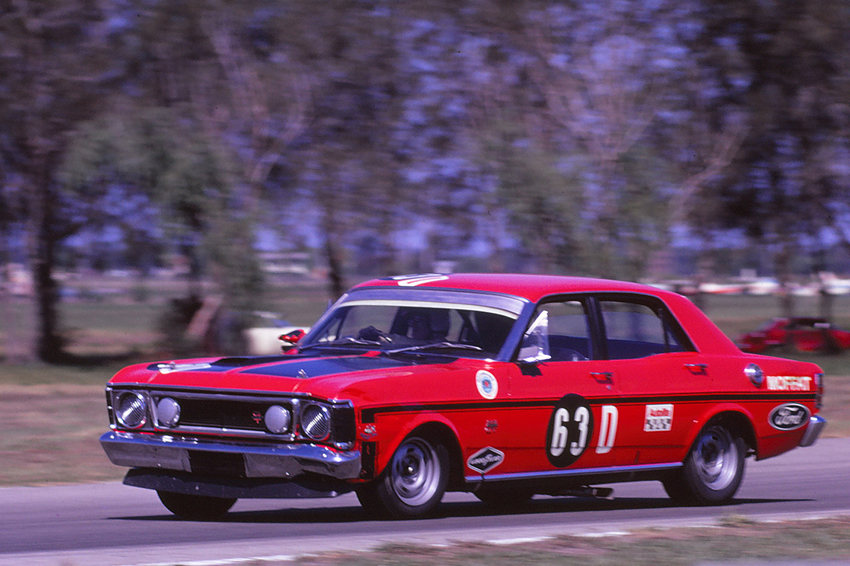
- Moffat racing in the 1970 Rothmans 250 Production Classic, 1970
- Nationality: Canadian; Australian
- Born: Allan George Moffat; 10 November 1939 Saskatoon, Saskatchewan, Canada
- Died: 22 November 2025 (aged 86) Melbourne, Victoria, Australia
- Relatives: James Moffat (son)

Australian Touring Car Championship
- Years active: 1965–89
- Teams: Allan Moffat Racing
- Starts: 100
- Wins: 32
- Best finish: 1st in 1973, 1976, 1977 & 1983 Australian Touring Car Championship

Previous series
- 1976 1980 1986 1986 1987: Australian Sports Sedan Ch. Australian Sports Car Champ. Australian Endurance Champ. FIA Touring Car Champ. World Touring Car Champ.

Championship titles
- 1973 1976 1976 1977 1980 1982 1983 1984: Australian Touring Car Champ. Australian Sports Sedan Ch. Australian Touring Car Champ. Australian Touring Car Champ. Australian Sports Car Champ. Australian Endurance Champ. Australian Touring Car Champ. Australian Endurance Champ.

Awards
- 1978 1999 2018: Order of the British Empire; V8 Supercars Hall of Fame; Sport Australia Hall of Fame

Allan George Moffat (10 November 1939 – 22 November 2025) was a Canadian and Australian racing driver known for his four championships in the Australian Touring Car Championship, six wins in the Sandown 500, his four wins in the Bathurst 500/1000 and his win in the 1975 12 Hours of Sebring. Moffat was inducted into the V8 Supercars Hall of Fame in 1999.

Moffat and his long-time friend and rival (and later co-driver) Peter Brock are the only drivers to have won The Great Race at Bathurst in both its 500-mile and 1000-kilometre formats.

In October 2018, Moffat was inducted into the Sport Australia Hall of Fame.

== Early life ==
Born in Saskatoon, Saskatchewan, Moffat was the eldest of three sons from Evelyn and Arthur Moffat. Moffat's father was an executive at Massey-Harris, resulting in Moffat living in Vereeniging, South Africa as a teenager and Melbourne, Australia in his college years as his family moved around for business reasons. Moffat studied marketing at Monash University with a cadetship at Volkswagen, but abandoned his studies to contest amateur circuit races in a Triumph TR3 and later returned to Canada due to a lack of funds. After briefly working as a door-to-door salesman in Toronto, Moffat befriended some Team Lotus mechanics at the Watkins Glen round of the 1964 United States Road Racing Championship and joined the team as a gofer before purchasing one of their Lotus Cortinas at seasons' end.

== Racing career ==
=== 1964 to 1971 ===
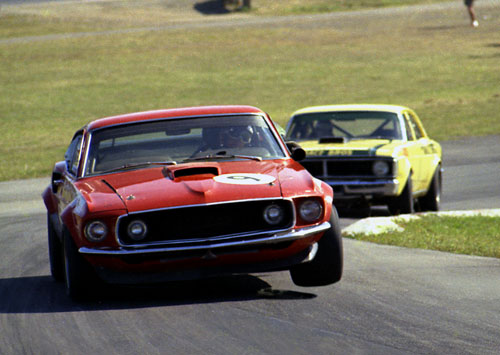
Allan Moffat in the Ford Boss 302 Mustang at Lakeside International Raceway, 1972

Moffat and Jon Leighton drove a Ford Cortina Lotus to fourth place in the 1964 Sandown 6 Hour International at Melbourne's Sandown Park. The race was the first of what would eventually become the Sandown 500.

Moffat first entered the Australian Touring Car Championship (ATCC) in 1965, driving a Lotus Cortina. Following this Moffat spent time in the United States where he drove in the new Trans-Am Series in 1966, showing his talent by winning the third round of the series, the Bryar 250, at the Bryar Motorsports Park, outright in an Under 2L division Lotus Cortina on 10 July 1966, leading home Bruce Jennings driving a Plymouth Barracuda by over a lap.

Moffat returned to Australia but also spent more time in the US, continuing to drive the Cortina as well as Ford Mustangs for Carroll Shelby in Trans-Am with various Australian co-drivers including Trans-Am regular Horst Kwech and Ford Australia's, and future Holden rival, Harry Firth. Moffat's time in Trans-Am included competing with Kwech in the Trans-Am class at the 24 Hours of Daytona and the 12 Hours of Sebring and driving four Trans-Am races in a Mercury Cougar for Bud Moore Engineering.

By 1969, Moffat had returned to live full-time in Australia and from 1969 he had become a regular ATCC competitor and his bright red Coca-Cola-sponsored Ford Boss 302 Mustang, which was supplied brand-new to Moffat from Ford's American 'in-house' race car fabrication and engineering facility "Kar Kraft" and finished off by Bud Moore Engineering, was unmistakable at circuits around Australia. With the help of Tom Hamilton and chief mechanic Lou Mallia, he would go on to win 101 championship and non-championship touring car races from 151 starts in this car between 1969 and 1972, including the first-ever win by one of the seven factory Boss Mustangs built for racing in its debut at the Southern 60 at Sandown in May 1969, yet his dream of winning the ATCC in the Mustang eluded him. He failed to place in the top-ten in 1969, finished sixth in 1970, 2nd in 1971 and 3rd in 1972.

Moffat and his Coke Mustang were involved in two of the most memorable ATCC races on record. In 1971, he went into the seventh and final round at Oran Park only four points behind three-time ATCC champion Bob Jane in his 7.0 litre Chevrolet Camaro ZL-1. Both started from the front row (Moffat on pole) and entered into an enticing duel. At mid-race, Moffat was forced to slow in order to free a jammed gearbox but battled back to only be six-tenths of a second behind Jane at the finish. Then in 1972, he was involved in a race-long dice with Ian Geoghegan at the Easter round of the series (Round 3) at the 6.172 km Mount Panorama Circuit at Bathurst. Up against Geoghegan's more powerful, 5.8L "Super Falcon", Moffat, while being left behind on the long Mountain and Conrod Straights, was able to keep with the Falcon using its superior handling and brakes and again only lost by less than a second. Moffat drove for over half the race with his safety belts undone so that he could put his head out of the driver's window in order to see where he was going, the Falcon having a small oil leak which saw some oil sprayed onto the Mustang's windscreen. By his own admission, Moffat did the wrong thing and turned his wipers on which only made the situation worse as it smeared the oil over the window, and with the race only being 13 laps long he was forced to carry on. Following the race, Moffat protested Geoghegan's Falcon but the protest was dismissed after Geoghegan's crew had time to wipe away the excess oil before the scrutineers could examine the car.

Although Moffat and a number of other drivers raced Mustangs for ATCC competition - the five ATCC titles from 1965 to 1969 were won by Norm Beechey (1965) and Ian Geoghegan (1966–69) driving Mustangs - this car, modified to CAMS Improved Production Touring Car regulations was ineligible for the Bathurst 500 (later Bathurst 1000), which was restricted to standard production cars prior to 1973. Moffat, therefore, made his debut in that race in 1969 in a Ford works team entered Ford Falcon XW GTHO. He and co-driver Alan Hamilton finished fourth. Due to the severe tyre problems suffered by the works GTHOs, Moffat was called into the pits early to change tyres. To the amazement of Ford team manager Al Turner, Moffat's tyres were not as nearly worn as those on the lead Geoghegan brothers or the Gibson/Seton Falcons, showing that Moffat was a driver who could be kind to his car and still go fast. Moffat maintains the view that he never wanted to pit at the time and that had he been left "to his own devices", he and Alan Hamilton would have won 1969 500. Moffat had actually been near last on the first lap of the race after his Falcon became stuck in neutral as he was powering out of The Cutting. This turned out to be fortunate as it allowed him to avoid the Bill Brown rollover going over Skyline which blocked the track and took out approximately a quarter of the field who had no warning of the impending disaster.

The following two years would see Moffat come into his own as one of Australia's most dominant race drivers, and the Falcon GTHO as an almost unbeatable car. For 1970, Ford Australia had made significant improvements to the Falcon XW GTHO Phase II over the previous year's model and Moffat, racing without a co-driver, took the car to two crushing victories in both the 1970 and 1971 Bathurst races, and also the 1970 Rothmans 250 Production Classic endurance race. In 1971 he became the first driver to lead the Bathurst 500 from start to finish while driving the famed Ford Falcon GTHO Phase III.

=== 1972 ===
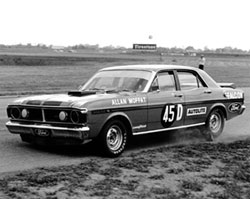
Moffat in the works Ford Falcon GTHO Phase III at Surfers Paradise International Raceway, February 1972

Moffat looked headed for a historic third straight Bathurst victory in 1972 when Ford unveiled plans for a "Phase IV" Falcon GTHO, even faster but more subtle than the Phase III which Moffat had taken to victory in 1971. Sydney-based motoring journalist Evan Green caught wind of these plans however and his article, with headlines across the country that screamed, "160mph Supercars on Our Roads!" created the Supercar scare. Facing pressure from the media and government not to produce this car, as entering it at Bathurst would also require at least 200 units to be sold at dealerships in Australia, Ford scrapped production of the Phase IV and forced Moffat and other Ford drivers to resort to year-old Phase III cars for Bathurst that year. Peter Brock won the race that year for arch-rival manufacturer Holden after wet weather and brake dramas hobbled the Fords. This race would be seen as the start of the Moffat-Brock rivalry that would dominate Australian touring car racing in the years to come.

=== 1973–1980 ===
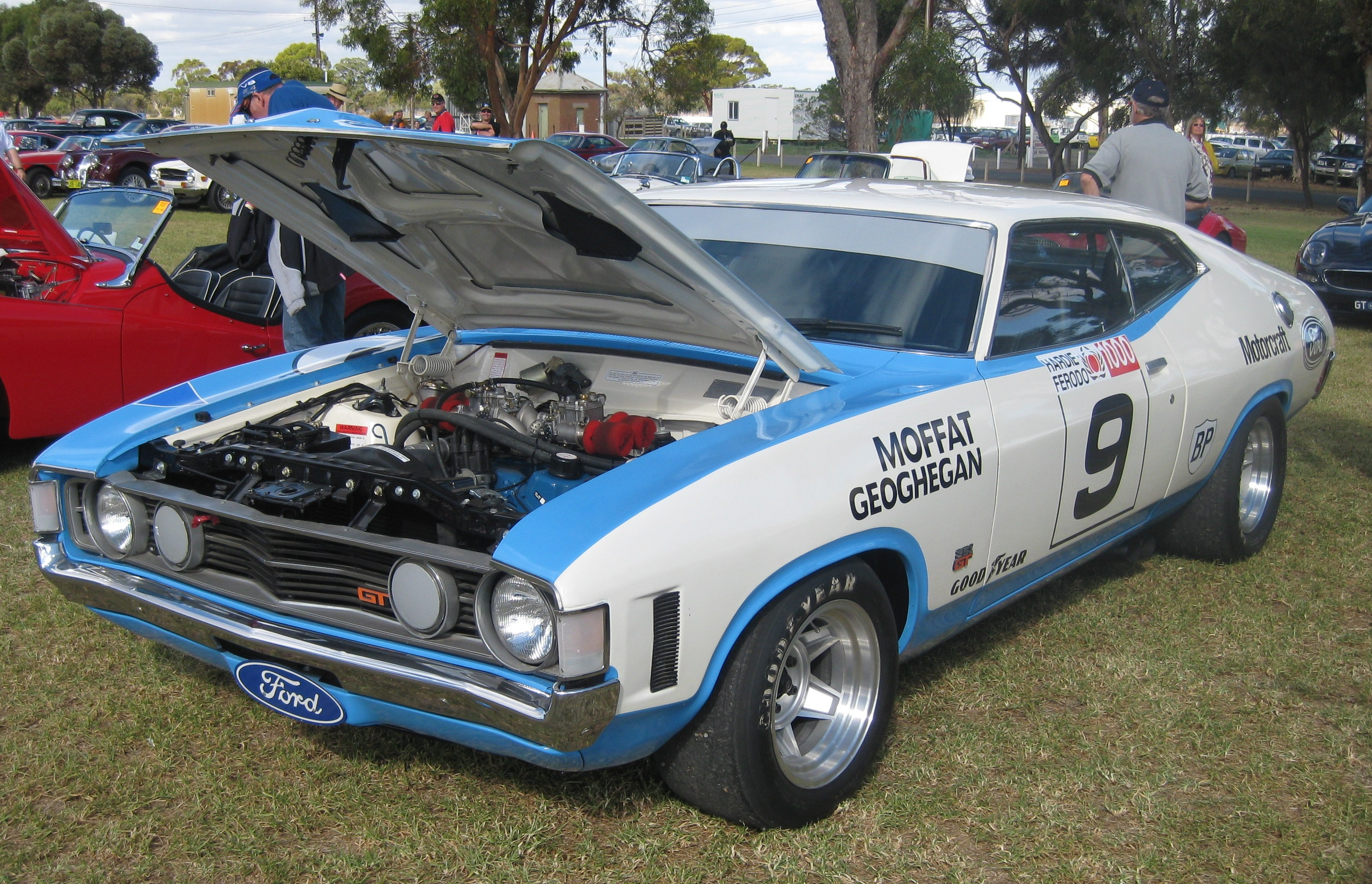
Replica of the Ford XA Falcon GT Hardtop in which Moffat and Ian Geoghegan won the 1973 Hardie-Ferodo 1000

In 1973, both the ATCC and the Bathurst endurance race were open for the first time only to the newly introduced CAMS Group C Touring Cars. These mildly modified cars replaced both the existing highly modified Group C Improved Production Touring Cars (which had contested the ATCC since 1965) and the virtually standard Group E Series Production Touring Cars (which had previously contested the Bathurst event). Ford, smarting from the Phase IV controversy the year before, withdrew their factory teams from the competition at the end of 1973. This left Moffat and other Ford drivers to form their own privateer teams, despite the Factory team and Moffat being victorious in both the 1973 ATCC - his first-ever - and the 1973 Hardie-Ferodo 1000 (with co-driver Ian Geoghegan). Moffat, Geoghegan, and Ford have the distinction of being the first winners of the Bathurst race following its conversion from a 500-mile event to 1000 km. The night before Round 6 of the ATCC at the Adelaide International Raceway, Moffat's GTHO Falcon Phase III was stolen from Stillwell Ford in the northern Adelaide suburb of Medindie. Rather than see Moffat out of the race (he was the series points leader at the time), Murray Carter loaned Moffat his GTHO Falcon for the race. Peter Brock won the race in his XU-1 Torana while Moffat kept his points lead by finishing second despite having to start at the rear of the grid. Moffat's stolen Falcon was later found abandoned in the Adelaide Hills, where the thieves who had taken it for a "joy ride" dumped it after running out of fuel.

Following the change from Improved Production to Group C for the ATCC in 1973, Moffat's Boss 302 Mustang was no longer eligible for that series. Moffat ran the Mustang in Sports Sedans in 1973 and 1974, though he refused to follow the trend at the time of moving the engine back in the cabin, later stating in a 2004 interview he "was never going to contaminate such a jewel", though he did replace the bodywork with fibreglass to avoid damaging the cars sheet metal. Following 1974, Moffat sent the Mustang back to Bud Moore in America where it sat for sale until 1995 when it was purchased and restored by Queensland based entrepreneur David Bowden (who other than himself and his sons has never let anyone other than Moffat drive the car, even turning down a request from the late Ian Geoghegan). The Mustang was voted the most popular 'Muscle Car' ever to race in Australia by readers of Australian Muscle Car magazine.

With Ford Australia pulling out of motor racing after 1973, Moffat competed as a privateer through the 1974 and 1975 seasons. He was only moderately successful in the Australian Touring Car Championship races, placing third in 1974 with two round wins and undertaking a limited campaign in 1975. Other wins included the 1974 Sandown 250 and the 1975 Rothmans 300. He failed to finish the Bathurst 1000 in those years. On 21 March 1975, he enhanced his reputation as an international class driver when he drove a BMW 3.0CSL with West Germany's Hans-Joachim Stuck, British driver Brian Redman and American Sam Posey to win the 12 Hours of Sebring for the factory-backed BMW Motorsport with many considering this win to be the 3.0CSL's crowning achievement in racing.

Moffat returned to drive his XB Falcon GT Hardtop full-time in the 1976 ATCC and won his second title. This occurred despite the setback of a transporter fire which destroyed his race car with several rounds left to run, forcing Moffat to borrow a car from rival John Goss for two rounds. Moffat also won the inaugural Australian Sports Sedan Championship that year, driving firstly a Chevrolet Monza and later a Ford Capri RS3100. He failed to finish Bathurst again in 1976 despite taking pole and leading comfortably with co-driver Vern Schuppan.

Moffat re-established his dominance in 1977 with a two-car factory-supported team under the Moffat Ford Dealers Team banner. He won his second consecutive ATCC title in 1977, backed up brilliantly by new teammate Colin Bond who had switched to Ford after driving the previous eight years for the Holden Dealer Team. This was the third ATCC win of his career, but this performance was overshadowed by the victory for Moffat and his new co-driver, Belgian Formula One driver and then four times 24 Hours of Le Mans winner Jacky Ickx in the 1977 Hardie-Ferodo 1000 at Bathurst. By the midpoint of the race the Moffat/Ickx car and the Bond/Alan Hamilton car led the field by over two laps. Late in the race Moffat's car encountered serious brake problems due to Ickx's hard driving of what was to him an unfamiliar car and had to slow, allowing Bond to catch up for the cars to complete the final two laps of the race side by side and cross the finish line in tandem with Bond allowing Moffat to stay barely in front for a crushing 1–2 victory for Ford. This moment is remembered as one of the most famous in Australian motor sport history and still regarded by many as Ford's finest hour. The following year Moffat received an Order of the British Empire in 1978 for exceptional services to motor sport.

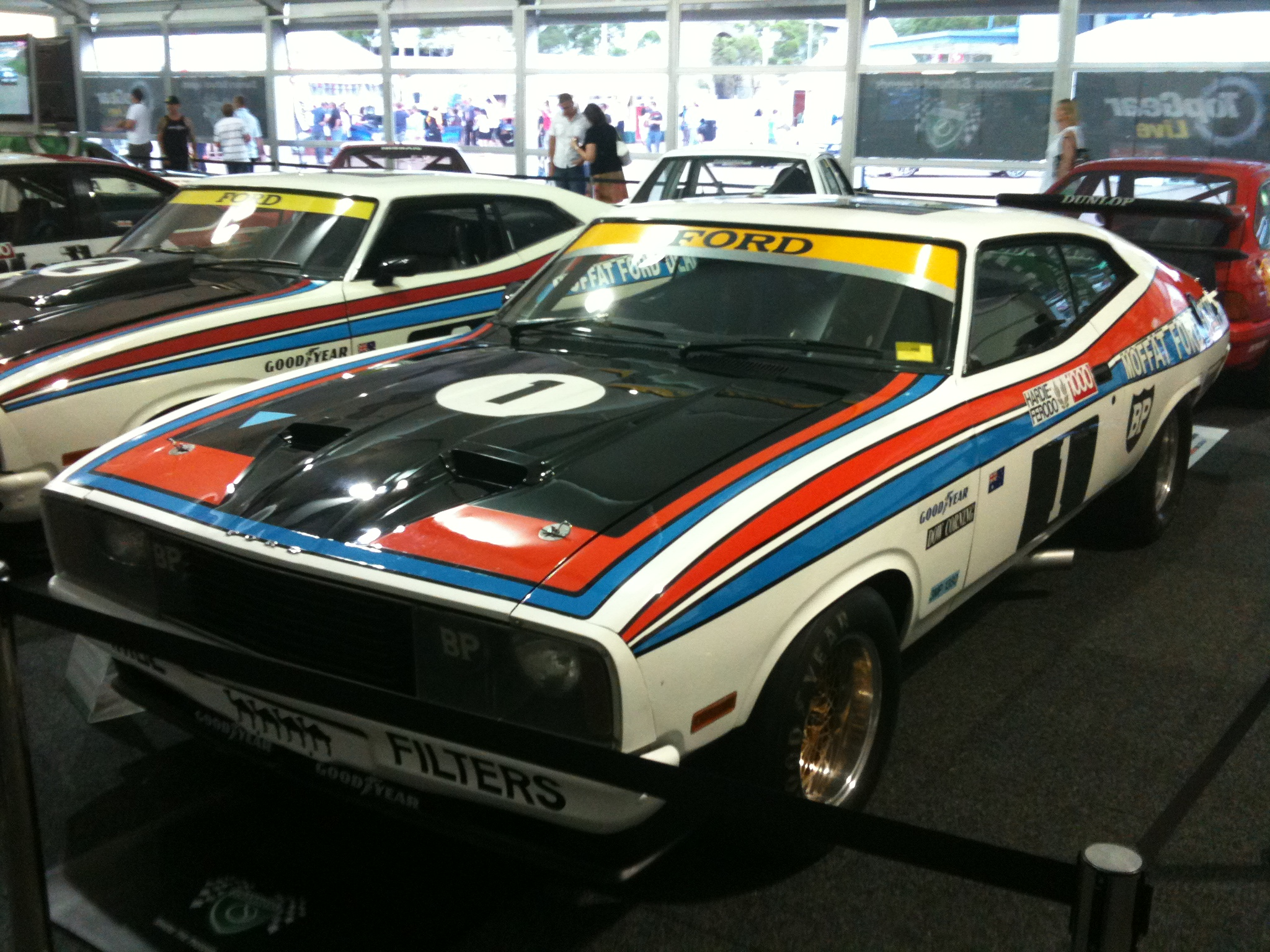
Ford XC Falcon Hardtop Group C race car - Moffat/Ickx 1977 Hardie Ferodo 1000 race winning car (second-placed team car of Bond/Hamilton in the background)

Moffat was unable to repeat his 1977 successes over the following three years. Moffat and Bond split at the end of the 1978 season and Moffat continued racing in Falcons until the 1980 Bathurst race when he competed for the last time in a Ford Falcon with the XD model.

In 1980, Moffat competed in various cars and in various countries. He drove a Porsche 934 turbo to win the Australian Sports Car Championship. He also drove at the 1980 24 Hours of Le Mans, sharing a Porsche 935 turbo with future Indycar legend Bobby Rahal, where they were forced to withdraw whilst in fourth place. He also did a guest drive for the Holden Dealer Team taking third place in the 1980 Hang Ten 400 at Sandown driving a Holden Commodore. The event was marked by the fact that it was only the second time Moffat had raced a Holden and the first time that he was driving in the same team as his archrival Peter Brock.

=== 1981 and beyond ===
Moffat also tested a Jaguar XJS at Bathurst in 1985.

=== Mazda ===
Much to the dismay of the Aussie Ford fans, Moffat left the "Blue Oval" brand in 1981 to drive a Peter Stuyvesant-sponsored Mazda RX-7 as both the ATCC and Bathurst began to exhibit a shift towards lighter touring cars with less raw power. Moffat drove the RX-7 to four consecutive top-six finishes at Bathurst between 1981 and 1984 including a second in 1983 and third in 1984 while winning his fourth and final ATCC title in 1983. During this time, Moffat drove his RX-7 to victories in the 1982 and 1984 Australian Endurance Championships.

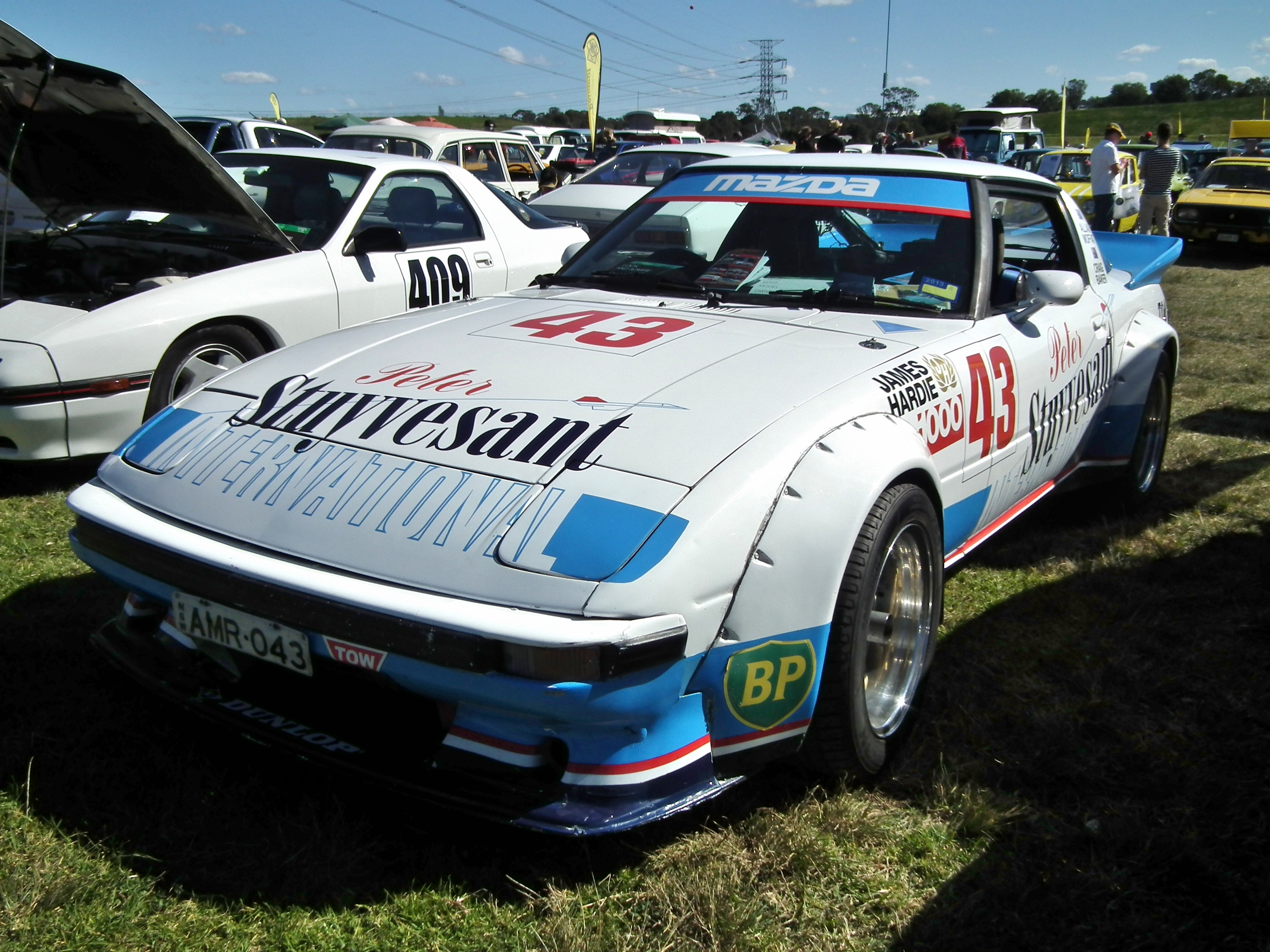
Replica of the 1982 Mazda RX7 Group C race car driven by Moffat and Yoshimi Katayama in the 1982 James Hardie 1000

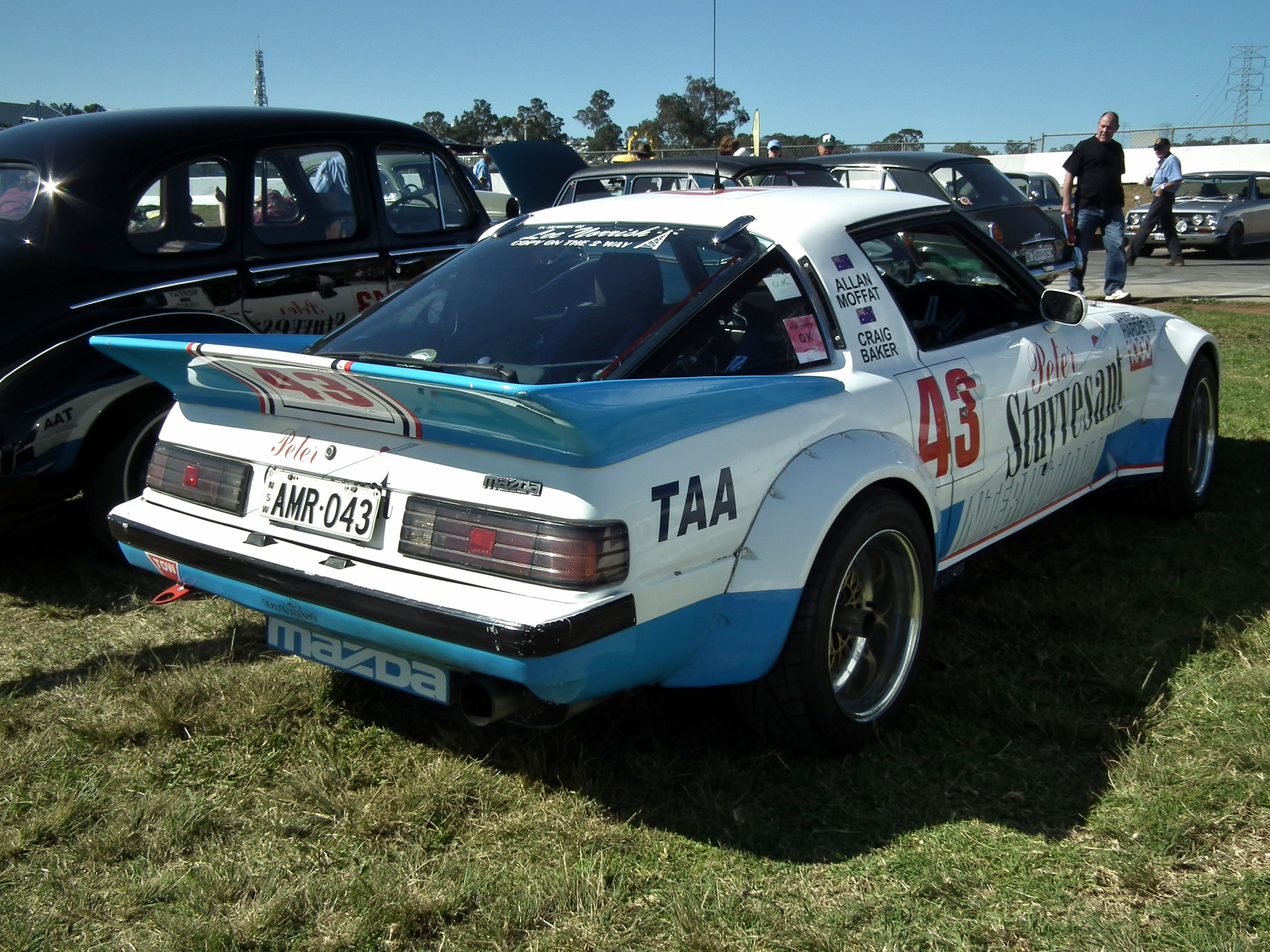
1982 Mazda RX7 Group C race car replica

Moffat also competed at the 24 Hours of Daytona in an RX-7, taking a class win in 1982 with co-drivers Lee Mulle and Kathy Rude. In 1982 he again competed at Le Mans in a factory RX-7-based sportscar, finishing sixth in class alongside Japanese co-drivers Yojiro Terada and Takashi Yorino. In his bid to win the 1983 ATCC, Moffat had to turn down a factory drive for Mazda at the 1983 24 Hours of Le Mans as the final round of the ATCC at Lakeside was held the same weekend as the French classic (the Mazda 717C he was to drive would win the races' Group C Junior class). Moffat went into the ATCC race in second place behind the Nissan Bluebird of George Fury, and with the Nissan team not attending the meeting Moffat needed to finish no lower than fifth to claim his fourth title. He eventually finished in an easy third place behind teammate Gregg Hansford in the team's second RX-7, and race winner Peter Brock in his HDT Commodore SS to claim the ATCC by just six points. Brock lapped the field, the first time in ATCC history a driver had won a race by over a lap, while Moffat, who lead from pole (his 4th of the 8 round series) but gave best to the flying Brock on lap 2, simply drove for the points on a wet track which normally would normally have suited the RX-7 over the heavier Holden.

1984 would prove to be a frustrating year for Moffat. After finishing third in the opening round of the ATCC at Sandown behind winner Brock and second-placed Dick Johnson (Johnson had taken Moffat's 1970s mantle of being the leading Ford driver in the country), he claimed pole in his RX-7 (fitted with the 13B rotary engine instead of the 12A of 1983) at Symmons Plains. However, due to the cold conditions the team put a cover over the front of the car to help warm up the engine. Unfortunately the fuse for the overheating warning light had blown and Moffat's race only lasted until the hairpin on lap one before his rotary engine expired, handing an easy win to Brock. He then won at Wanneroo in Perth, before crashing out of the championship at Surfers Paradise when his Mazda was hit while lapping the XD Falcon of Gary Willmington at high speed going under the Dunlop Bridge at the end of the main straight. Due to the wet conditions the Mazda slid off the road at high speed, took out an ABC television camera cable and slammed head on into a bush that was hiding a tree stump. In what was his biggest crash since rolling his XA Falcon at Phillip Island in 1973, Moffat suffered a fractured sternum and broken finger in the accident, while the RX-7 was a write-off.

After his crash at Surfers Paradise, there was much speculation in the motor racing press that the 45-year-old was going to retire from full-time driving at the end of the year. Moffat refuted these claims and made his comeback in Round 2 of the 1984 Australian Endurance Championship at Oran Park. Despite suffering from the flu, Moffat put the RX-7 on pole and he and Gregg Hansford went on to win the Valvoline 250 from the XE Falcon of ATCC winner Dick Johnson. Moffat and Hansford then finished second to Peter Brock and Larry Perkins in the Castrol 500 at Sandown, and claimed third at the James Hardie 1000 behind the two Holden Dealer Team Commodores, who staged a 1-2 finish trying to copy what Moffat and Bond had achieved in 1977, though unlike the Moffat Ford Dealers Falcons which were on the same lap, the Brock/Perkins car was two laps ahead of teammates John Harvey and David Parsons. Moffat's team entered two cars in the race, but only listed Moffat and Hansford as drivers, and had to fight with Bathurst race organisers the Australian Racing Drivers Club (ARDC) to be allowed to start both cars, as both drivers had qualified inside the top 10 (race regulations stated that the top 8 qualifiers were locked in to participate in the Hardies Heroes top-ten run-off, with Moffat 5th and Hansford 6th). Moffat won the fight with the ARDC and his decision to start both cars was vindicated when his own #43 RX-7 was involved in a car banging duel with the Falcon of Steve Masterson soon after the original start. After only 15 laps of the second start (the first was aborted after the John Goss Jaguar XJS driven by European Touring Car Champion Tom Walkinshaw had stalled and was hit from behind causing the pit straight to be blocked), Moffat was forced to retire his car with terminal engine problems after only 15 laps and move into Hansford's, which had been originally intended to run about 20 laps, but lasted 161 (with Moffat himself only driving the middle 'lunchtime' stint and Hansford driving the majority of the race). Moffat then went on to finish second behind Brock in the Surfers Paradise 300 to claim the final Australian Endurance Championship, and the final ever championship run under CAMS Group C rules.

In 1985, Moffat took his own RX-7 that he campaigned previously in Australia to Daytona for the 24 Hour race, sharing the car with Australian drivers Gregg Hansford, Kevin Bartlett and Peter McLeod. The car differed from its Australian configuration, a new rear wing was run on the car and 20 kg of ballast was removed, bringing it down to its actual homologated weight of 930 kg, while the engine was the same 13B that had carried Moffat and Hansford to third place at Bathurst the previous year. Moffat qualified the car in 38th (12th in the GTO class) and eventually finished 24th and seventh in class, some 221 laps behind the race winners. Regular RX-7 drivers Moffat, Hansford and McLeod all expressed how much more effective the 13B motor was without the CAMS imposed extra 20 kg. While Moffat made the RX-7 a regular race winner on the shorter and generally flatter Australian tracks, he believes the extra weight in the car was what made it impossible to match the V8's at Bathurst.

With Mazda not interested in Group A racing (he tested a Mazda 626 at Calder Park but it proved to be uncompetitive), Moffat was forced to sit out the 1985 Australian season. He joined the ABC television coverage of the 1985 Castrol 500 at Sandown, and was an expert commentator for Channel 7's coverage of the 1985 James Hardie 1000, testing several cars for the coverage including a HDT VK Commodore, a BMW 635 CSi from JPS Team BMW and also the turbocharged Volvo 240T.

=== Holden ===
Moffat then returned to touring car racing for four more years (1986–1989). 1986 was notable in that Moffat had joined longtime rival and friend Peter Brock and the Holden Dealer Team (though he had previously driven for the team in the 1980 Hang Ten 400 at Sandown). The two most successful drivers in Australia were immediately successful, winning the 1986 Wellington 500 in New Zealand in the brand-new Holden VK Commodore SS Group A. Moffat and Brock then went to Europe to race in the FIA Touring Car Championship (formerly the European Touring Car Championship) with two 5th placings at Donington and Hockenheim being their best on-track results. Despite not actually winning the race overall, the HDT's two-car attack on the 1986 Spa 24 Hours was considered to be a success because they won the prestigious "Kings Cup" teams prize along with Allan Grice's Commodore (the Kings Cup is awarded to the "team" who has the highest overall placings for at least 3 of their cars at the end of the race). Moffat, Brock and John Harvey finished the race itself in 22nd place after suffering two head gasket failures. The lead car finished four places behind the team's second car, which finished in 18th spot. The HDT's 1986 European campaign was to be a precursor to an all-out attack on the 1987 World Touring Car Championship.

Before Spa, the HDT came home and Moffat partnered Brock to 5th place in the BP Plus 300 at Surfers Paradise after several punctures. This was followed by the 1986 Castrol 500 at Sandown. Between them Moffat and Brock had won 14 of the previous 17 Sandown Enduro's. Brock qualified the car on pole but tyre problems in the race meant only a 4th-placed finish for the pair in their second-ever Australian race together. Despite this the HDT went to the 1986 James Hardie 1000 confident of victory and the Brock/Moffat partnership in car #05 were favoured to win with the pair having won 12 of the previous 16 Bathurst 1000's between them. Both drivers were in good form during practice, posting times that would have individually got them into the top 10 with Brock only slightly quicker and posting overall second best time behind the Roadways Racing Commodore of Allan Grice (Moffat's own time in the Commodore was fourth fastest, silencing those who felt he was past his best as a driver). Then early in Friday's qualifying session Moffat, in what turned out to be his only serious crash at Bathurst, put the 05 Commodore into the wall at the top of the mountain. This unfortunately caused the car to miss the Hardies Heroes Top 10 run off the next day as the car could not be repaired in time, its place in the top 10 being taken by the Commodore of former motorcycle racer Graeme Crosby. This meant that the Brock/Moffat car would start 11th on the grid. According to the team the car was repaired 'better than new' and Brock recorded a 2:18.80 lap in Saturday afternoon's practice. The race though only gave the Brock/Moffat team fifth place after they lost some seven minutes in the pits bypassing a leaking oil cooler. Moffat himself was hampered by an injured wrist sustained in Friday's crash. While not showing any discomfort on RaceCam, he was unable to push as hard as he would have liked although he lost no time to the leaders during his driving stints. Despite the loss of two and a half laps and with the engine close to overheating due to not running the oil cooler, Brock and Moffat ran hard and fast for the rest of the race and made up ground to be only 1 lap down on the winning Grice/Graeme Bailey car at race end. The HDT's other car driven by John Harvey and Neal Lowe finished the race in 2nd place after a relatively trouble-free run.

1987 started well with Brock and Moffat again winning the Wellington 500 before the pair went on to claim the 1987 Nissan-Mobil 500 series with a strong 3rd place in the Pukekohe 500 a week later. Then the HDT as a factory team fell apart after Holden cut all official ties with Brock over his public launch of the VL Commodore based HDT Director. Moffat then quit the team and purchased the brand-new Holden VL Commodore SS Group A that Brock had intended to take to Europe to compete in the World Touring Car Championship. Although Moffat left the HDT still on good terms with Brock, he purchased the car through a middleman to avoid any friction with having his former employer knowing the true buyer. The car was then immediately shipped to England for preparation for the first round of the WTCC.

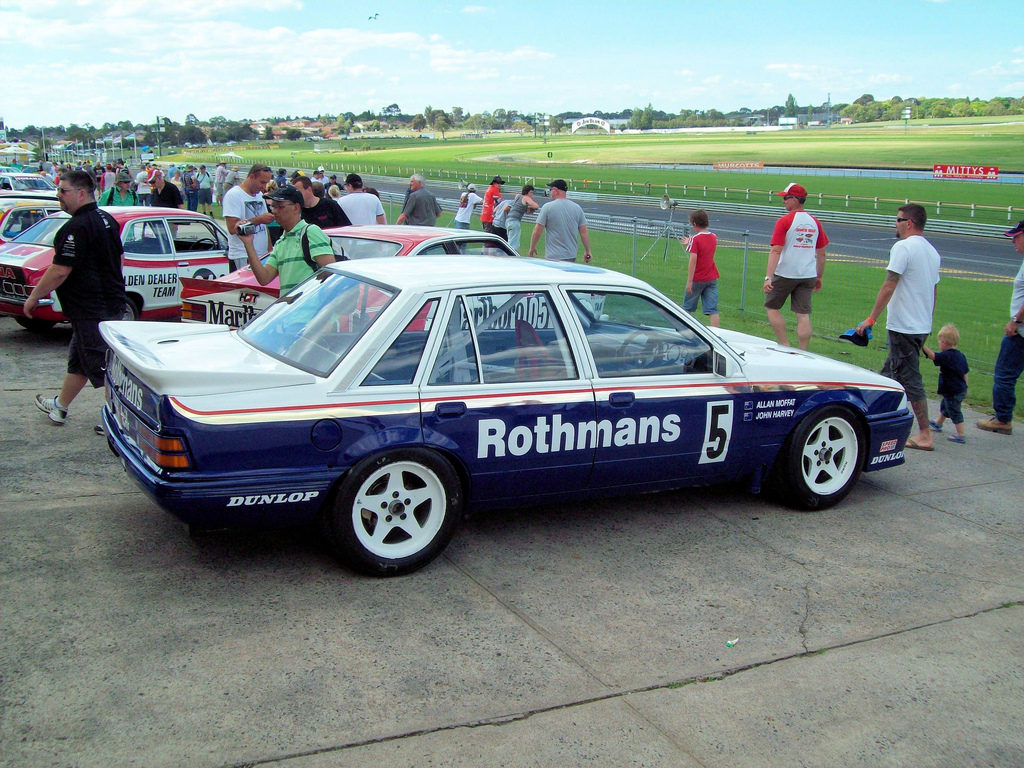
Holden VL Commodore SS Group A of Allan Moffat & John Harvey, winner of the 1987 Monza 500, on display at the Historic Sandown 2009

In the first round held at Monza, Moffat and his co-driver, ex-HDT driver John Harvey who had also quit the Brock team after 11 years of loyal service, qualified the car in ninth place and finished the race 7th on the road. Hours after the race, the Rothmans sponsored Commodore was declared the winner after a protest by a private BMW entry from Hungary had seen the works BMW M3's (which had finished 1–6) disqualified for being underweight (as of 2016 neither Moffat, nor Harvey, have possession of the winner's trophy as they never received it). Despite being declared the outright winners of the race, they did not receive championship points as the team had not paid the USD$60,000 championship entry fee imposed by series promoter Bernie Ecclestone (only cars whose teams had paid the fee were eligible for points, this saw some leading teams, notably Tom Walkinshaw's TWR who were also to race a Holden Commodore, pull out of the championship before it began).

The car was then a DNF at the next two rounds at Jarama and Dijon before Moffat and Harvey drove the Commodore to a sensational fourth place outright and a class win at the Spa 24-hour race. The pair were due to co-drive with Aussie privateer racer Tony Mulvihill at Spa, but unfortunately the Sydney driver failed to qualify. Qualifying at the famous circuit had been hit by the notorious Ardennes weather and while Mulvihill set a good enough time when the track was wet, he had not set a time on a dry track and towards the end of the final session the circuit dried and the Texaco sponsored Eggenberger Motorsport Ford Sierra RS Cosworth's significantly improved their times which left only Moffat and Harvey to drive the Commodore.

Moffat qualified the Commodore in 18th place, one place behind Peter Brock's HDT Commodore and 5.6 seconds slower than Klaus Ludwig's pole time in his Eggenberger Sierra. Moffat and Harvey then drove a steady race (mostly in the rain) to finish 4th with 468 laps completed.

=== Return to Ford ===
This also proved to be the Commodore's final race as Moffat, realising that to be competitive at Bathurst he would need one of the new, powerful Ford Sierra RS500's, completed a deal to lease the Andy Rouse run Sierra for the Australian rounds of the championship which was backed by new major sponsor ANZ Bank. This deal also left Harvey without a drive for the rest of the year as Rouse and his co-driver Thierry Tassin would share the driving with Moffat. The deal proved a disaster for Moffat as the car was retired at both the James Hardie 1000 and the Calder 500 before Moffat got his turn to race.

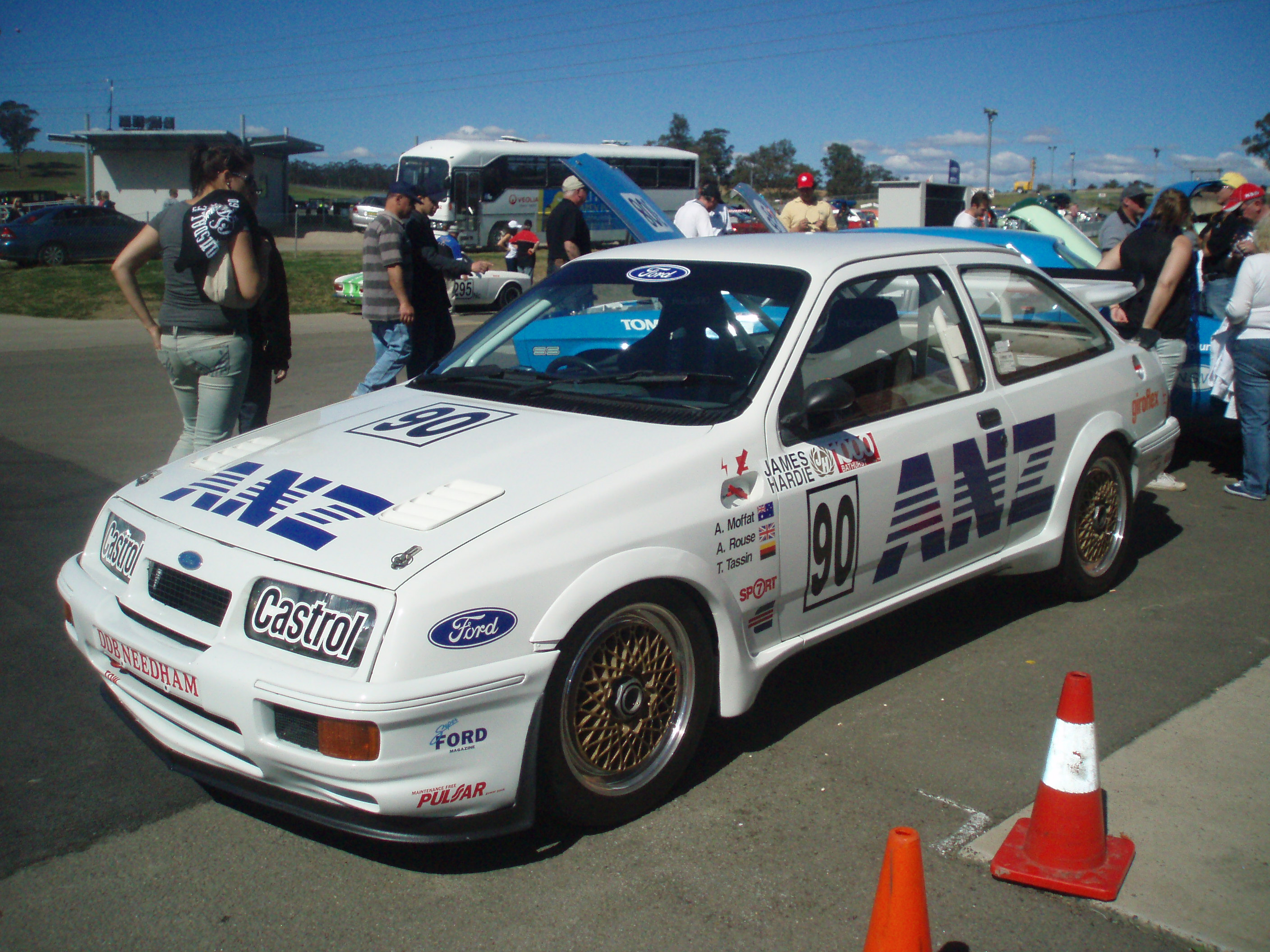
Ford Sierra RS500 Cosworth Group A race car - Moffat/Rouse/Tassin 1987 James Hardie 1000

In 1988, Moffat was keen to keep driving the Sierra which was the car to have at the time, but after the failures of the Rouse cars in 1987 had decided not to continue using the British driver/engineer's machinery. In a 2014 interview with Australian Muscle Car magazine, Moffat told that he was livid following the failure at Bathurst after finding that the Getrag gearbox that broke in the Sierra had been the same one Rouse had used at the Spa 24 Hours and had done some 36 hours of practice and racing, well past its rebuild point. Instead he managed to do something that very few had managed to do. He persuaded Swiss touring car tuning ace Ruedi Eggenberger to build him a customer Sierra RS500 that was identical to the works Fords that the Eggenberger team was using in the renamed ETCC. The deal was rumored to have cost Moffat around A$300,000. Moffat and former Mazda co-driver Gregg Hansford campaigned the car in the 1988 ATCC in a low-key run while his team after years of racing rotary Mazda's and V8 Commodores and Falcons, got to know the sophisticated turbocharged car.

Moffat and Hansford went on to win the 1988 Enzed 500 at Sandown in what was Moffat's last ever win in Australia. They then almost pulled off an upset at the Tooheys 1000 at Bathurst where Eggenberger himself joined the team and along with his Ford Europe driver, German ace Klaus Niedzwiedz. With Eggenberger waving his 'magic wand' over the Sierra, and Niedzwiedz leading the driving, the pair turned the car into one of the fastest on the track, qualifying 4th and winning the $40,000 "Tooheys Top Gun" run-off, which for the only time in its history wasn't for pole (Moffat's fastest time in practice was some six seconds slower than the German and eight seconds off the pole time set by Dick Johnson). The car ultimately was a DNF after head gasket failure on lap 129 of 161 with Hansford at the wheel. Niedzwiedz had taken the lead from the Sierra of Tony Longhurst on lap 29 when Longhurst lost a lap with a throttle problem, and the car remained in the lead for 100 laps before a vapor lock (caused by the car cooling down too much during a safety car period) led to the car's failure. Moffat later claimed that the 1988 Bathurst was the "one that got away", and with a one-lap lead with just 32 laps remaining and ace driver Niedzwiedz up against Longhurst's slower co-driver Tomas Mezera, not many people were disagreeing with him. In a pit interview moments after the car was officially retired, a glum but remarkably composed Moffat said that the engine of the Sierra basically had a "heart attack". The team would later find that it was a blown head gasket and a cracked block.

This race was also significant in that it was the last time Moffat raced at Bathurst. He did enter and qualify for the 1989 Tooheys 1000, but decided not to actually race as the lead team car driven by Niedzwiedz and fellow German Frank Biela had a chance at victory, and since they were much faster than he was in the car (approximately 6–8 seconds per lap in qualifying) he felt it best to leave them to it. Ultimately the Moffat lead Sierra would finish second behind the Sierra of Dick Johnson and John Bowe.

Other than his four wins at Bathurst, Moffat also won the Sandown Endurance race six times, being the only driver to win it under three different national regulations, these being Series Production (1969, 1970), Group C (1974, 1982, 1983) and Group A (1988).

Moffat's last race, and indeed last race win, was in 1989 driving with Niedzwiedz. The pair drive Moffat's Sierra (with Ruedi Eggenberger again on hand to engineer the car) in the InterTEC 500 km race at the Fuji Speedway in Japan. Allan Moffat quietly retired from competitive race driving after the Fuji win, keeping a promise he had made to himself and his wife Pauline that he wouldn't race beyond his 50th birthday (the Fuji 500 was run two days after Moffat's 50th). He later worked as a TV commentator for Channel 7 and a spokesman for BMW. He also appeared at various Ford club events across Australia, promoted his longtime backer GT Radial Tyres, and later still (2009-) was seen in television advertisements in Australia promoting FPV GTs.

== Post-driving career ==
Moffat continued as the team owner and manager of Allan Moffat Enterprises, which ran the RS500 Sierras until the demise of Group A at the end of 1992. In a significant partnership, car builder Eggenberger and ace driver Niedzwiedz joined Moffat at Bathurst every year from 1988 to 1992 excluding the 1991 race when they were not available due to other commitments. The best result for the team during this period was Niedzwiedz's second place with Frank Biela at the 1989 race. Niedzwiedz gave the Moffat-ANZ team pole position at the 1990 Tooheys 1000 while he had also won the top-ten run-off in 1988 when race regulations meant that the run-off did not count for grid positions. Eggenberger and Niedzwiedz also managed to join Moffat for other Australian races, with Ruedi joining the team for the Phillip Island round of the 1990 ATCC which saw Hansford finish fifth, and also the 1990 Sandown 500 where Niedzwiedz qualified 5th in his first look at the Sandown circuit, though he and Hansford would fail to finish the race.

At the end of 1990, the team suffered a blow when it lost its major sponsor ANZ. The bank had been recording end of financial year losses and had decided that it would not be right to continue sponsoring the team after it was forced to lay off some 3,000 employees. This significantly cut into the team's finances and plans to run the car in the 1991 Australian Touring Car Championship were shelved. However, with new sponsorship from Cenovis Vitamins, the team was able to carry on running the Sierras (which by this stage were only seen at Sandown and Bathurst) until they and other turbo cars (such as the 4WD Nissan GT-R) were banned by CAMS at the end of 1992.

After the Sierras were banned in their RS500 form at the end of 1992, Moffat decided to continue his long association with Ford and built an eye-catching Ford EB Falcon painted black and yellow in the colours of team sponsor Cenovis for the 1993 Tooheys 1000. The team's first Bathurst with a Falcon since 1980 did not turn out much better than their previous attempt which had only lasted 3 laps. The car's V8 engine was built by another longtime Moffat associate, Kar Kraft, in the United States (who had supplied Moffat with his Boss Mustang back in 1969) and was built with a Carburetor instead of the fuel injection of the leading cars. Driven by Charlie O'Brien and Andrew Miedecke, the car qualified 18th but retired with gearbox failure after completing just 41 of the race's 161 laps. For the 1994 Tooheys 1000, Moffat had his race engines supplied by Dick Johnson Racing and the team, with drivers Miedecke and Englishman Jeff Allam were more competitive, qualifying 16th and finished a well-deserved eighth, only four laps behind the winning Falcon of Dick Johnson and John Bowe.

The 1995 Tooheys 1000 saw the team struggle once more. Andrew Miedecke was again lead driver and qualified the aging EB Falcon in 16th place but co-driver Mark Noske never got a drive with the car retiring on lap 16 with engine trouble. The 1996 AMP Bathurst 1000 was the last time that an Allan Moffat-built or driven (in this case just built) car raced at Bathurst. In what was also his last Bathurst race, Klaus Niedzwiedz returned to the team, where he joined production car expert Ken Douglas in a strong run to finish tenth after Niedzwiedz qualified the older model (EB compared to the EF) and underpowered Falcon in 25th place.

From 1991 until 1996, Moffat's cars only raced at the Sandown 500 or Bathurst 1000 races as the team's finances and resources were insufficient to allow them to race in rounds of the Touring Car Championship. Moffat himself also doubled as an expert commentator for Channel 7 during its motorsport telecasts during this time, including at Bathurst, where he had the dual role of commentator and race team manager. Moffat also joined Murray Walker and later Darrell Eastlake in the Channel 9 commentary box during the touring car support races at the Australian Grand Prix meetings in Adelaide from 1985 to 1995.

== Later life and death ==
On 2 February 2004, Moffat received Australian citizenship in a ceremony at the Australian Grand Prix Corporation offices in Melbourne. He had been eligible for citizenship since the early 1970s but, in his own words, "one way or another I never followed it through." The citation itself was given by his former rival, Peter Brock.

Moffat's two sons Andrew Moffat and James Moffat followed their father into motor racing. James Moffat finished second driving for Nissan Motorsport in the 2014 Supercheap Auto Bathurst 1000. It was the first time the Moffat name had been on the Bathurst 1000 podium since Allan finished third in 1984.

In 2019, it was reported that Moffat was diagnosed with Alzheimer's disease and had been moved to a specialist healthcare facility in Melbourne, with his friends and Bathurst legends Fred Gibson and Larry Perkins ensuring his will instructions to be carried out. Moffat died on 22 November 2025, at the age of 86 in Melbourne, Australia.

== Career results ==
Season	Series	Position	Car	Team
1965	Australian Touring Car Championship	4th	Ford Cortina Lotus	Allan Moffat Racing
1970	Tasman Touring Series	1st	Ford XW Falcon GTHO	Ford Motor Company
1970	Australian Touring Car Championship	6th	Ford Mustang Boss 302	Team Coca-Cola A.M.R.
1971	South Pacific Touring Series	2nd	Ford XY Falcon GTHO Phase III	Ford Motor Company
1971	Australian Touring Car Championship	2nd	Ford Mustang Boss 302	Team Coca-Cola A.M.R.
1972	South Pacific Touring Series	2nd	Ford Falcon GTHO	Ford Motor Company of Australia Ltd.
1972	Australian Touring Car Championship	3rd	Ford Mustang Boss 302	Allan Moffat Racing
1973	Australian Touring Car Championship	1st	Ford XY Falcon GTHO Phase III	Allan Moffat Racing
1973	Toby Lee Series	5th	Ford Mustang Boss 302	Allan Moffat Racing
1974	Australian Touring Car Championship	3rd	Ford XB Falcon GT Hardtop	Moffat Ford Dealers
1974	Toby Lee Series	10th	Ford Mustang Boss 302	Allan Moffat Racing
1975	Australian Touring Car Championship	22nd	Ford XB Falcon GT Hardtop	Allan Moffat Racing
1976	Australian Touring Car Championship	1st	Ford XB Falcon GT Hardtop	Moffat Ford Dealers
1976	Australian Sports Sedan Championship	1st	Ford Capri RS3100; Chevrolet Monza	Allan Moffat Racing
1977	Australian Touring Car Championship	1st	Ford XB Falcon GT Hardtop; Ford XC Falcon GS500 Hardtop	Moffat Ford Dealers
1977	Australian Sports Sedan Championship	17th	Ford Capri RS3100	Allan Moffat Racing
1978	Australian Touring Car Championship	4th	Ford XC Falcon GS500 Hardtop	Moffat Ford Dealers
1979	Australian Touring Car Championship	27th	Ford XC Falcon GS500 Hardtop	Allan Moffat Racing
1979	Australian Sports Sedan Championship	7th	Chevrolet Monza	Allan Moffat Racing
1980	Australian Sports Car Championship	1st	Porsche 930 Turbo	Porsche Distributors
1980	Australian Sports Sedan Championship	13th	Chevrolet Monza; Mazda RX-7	Allan Moffat Racing
1982	Australian Touring Car Championship	3rd	Mazda RX-7	Peter Stuyvesant International Racing
1982	Australian Endurance Championship	1st	Mazda RX-7	Peter Stuyvesant International Racing
1983	Australian Touring Car Championship	1st	Mazda RX-7	Peter Stuyvesant International Racing
1983	Australian Endurance Championship	4th	Mazda RX-7	Peter Stuyvesant International
1984	Australian Touring Car Championship	9th	Mazda RX-7	Peter Stuyvesant International Racing
1984	Australian Endurance Championship	1st	Mazda RX-7	Peter Stuyvesant International Racing
1986	Australian Endurance Championship	13th	Holden VK Commodore SS Group A	Holden Dealer Team
1987	Nissan-Mobil 500 Series	1st	Holden VK Commodore SS Group A	Holden Dealer Team
1988	Australian Touring Car Championship	9th	Ford Sierra RS500	Allan Moffat Enterprises
1989	Australian Touring Car Championship	11th	Ford Sierra RS500	Allan Moffat Enterprises

=== SCCA National Championship Runoffs ===
Year	Track	Car	Engine	Class	Finish	Start	Overall Finish
1966	Riverside	Lotus Cortina	Ford	B Sedan	2	1	6

=== Complete World Sportscar Championship results ===
(key) (Races in bold indicate pole position) (Races in italics indicate fastest lap)

Year	Team	Car	1	2	3	4	5	6	7	8	9	10	11	12	13	14	15	16	DC	Points
1968	(United States) Shelby Racing	Ford Mustang	DAY; Ret	SEB; Ret	BRA	MNZ	TAR	NUR	SPA	WAT	ZEL	LMS							NC	0
1980	(United States) JLC Racing	Mazda RX-7	DAY; 24	BRA	SEB	MUG	MNZ	RIV	SIL	NUR									NC	0
1980	(United States) Dick Barbour Racing	Porsche 935 K3									LMS; Ret	DAY	WAT	SPA	MOS	VAL	RAM	DIJ	NC	0
1982	(Japan) Mazdaspeed Co. Ltd.	Mazda RX-7	MNZ	SIL	NUR	LMS; 14	SPA	MUG	FJI	BRA									NC	0

=== Complete Australian Touring Car Championship results ===
(key) (Races in bold indicate pole position) (Races in italics indicate fastest lap)

Year	Team	Car	1	2	3	4	5	6	7	8	9	10	11	DC	Points
1965	Allan Moffat Racing	Ford Cortina Mark I Lotus	SAN; 4											4th	-
1970	Team Coca-Cola A.M.R.	Ford Mustang Boss 302 Ford XW Falcon GTHO Phase II	CAL; 1	BAT; Ret	SAN; 3	MAL; Ret	WAR; Ret	LAK; Ret	SYM; DNS					6th	13
1971	Team Coca-Cola A.M.R.	Ford Mustang Boss 302	SYM; 1	CAL; Ret	SAN; DSQ	SUR; 1	MAL; 3	LAK; 1	ORA; 2					2nd	37
1972	Allan Moffat Racing	Ford Mustang Boss 302	SYM; 1	CAL; Ret	BAT; 2	SAN; 1	AIR; 4	WAR; DSQ	SUR; 10	ORA; 1				3rd	53
1973	Allan Moffat Racing	Ford XY Falcon GTHO Phase III	SYM; 1	CAL; 1	SAN; 1	WAN; 1	SUR; 3	AIR; 2*	ORA; 1	WAR; Ret				1st	53
1974	Allan Moffat Racing	Ford XA Falcon GT Hardtop Ford XB Falcon GT Hardtop	SYM; 2	CAL; 4	SAN; 1	AMA; 9	ORA; 1	SUR	AIR					3rd	39
1975	Allan Moffat Racing	Ford XB Falcon GT Hardtop	SYM; 5	CAL	AMA	ORA	SUR	SAN	AIR	LAK				23rd	2
1976	Allan Moffat Racing	Ford XB Falcon GT Hardtop	SYM; 6	CAL; 1	ORA; 1	SAN; Ret	AMA; 2	AIR; 1	LAK; 2	SAN; 2	AIR; 4	SUR; 2	PHI	1st	80
1977	Moffat Ford Dealers	Ford XB Falcon GT Hardtop Ford XC Falcon GS500 Hardtop	SYM; 1	CAL; 1	ORA; 1	AMA; 1	SAN; 1	AIR; 2	LAK; Ret	SAN; 3	AIR; 1	SUR; 1	PHI	1st	106
1978	Moffat Ford Dealers	Ford XC Falcon GS500 Hardtop	SYM; Ret	ORA; Ret	AMA; 2	SAN; DSQ	WAN	CAL	LAK; 1	AIR; 2				4th	31
1979	Allan Moffat Racing	Ford XC Falcon GS500 Hardtop	SYM	CAL; Ret	ORA; Ret	SAN; 5	WAN	SUR	LAK	AIR				27th	2
1982	Peter Stuyvesant International	Mazda RX-7	SAN; 6	CAL	SYM; Ret	ORA; 7	LAK; 1	WAN	AIR; Ret	SUR; 1				3rd	31
1983	Peter Stuyvesant International Racing	Mazda RX-7	CAL; 1	SAN; Ret	SYM; 2	WAN; 1	**AIR**; 2	**SUR**; 1	ORA; 1	**LAK**; 3				1st	166
1984	Peter Stuyvesant International Racing	Mazda RX-7	SAN; 3	**SYM**; Ret	**WAN**; 1	SUR; Ret	ORA	LAK	AIR					9th	45
1988	Allan Moffat Enterprises	Ford Sierra RS500	CAL	SYM	WIN	WAN; Ret	AIR; 7	LAK; 3	SAN; 4	AMA; 6	ORA; 14			9th	32
1989	Allan Moffat Enterprises	Ford Sierra RS500	AMA; 7	SYM; Ret	LAK	WAN; Ret	MAL; DSQ	SAN; 7	WIN	ORA; 6				11th	14

* Drove Murray Carter's Phase III Falcon at Adelaide International Raceway in 1973 due to his own Falcon being stolen the night before the race. The race was still entered as driving for the Ford Works Team.

=== Complete FIA European Touring Car Championship results ===
(key) (Races in bold indicate pole position) (Races in italics indicate fastest lap)

Year	Team	Car	1	2	3	4	5	6	7	8	9	10	11	12	13	14	DC	Points
1986	(Australia) Holden Dealer Team	Holden VK Commodore SS Group A	MNZ; Ret	DON; 5	HOC; 5	MIS	AND	BNO	OST	NUR	SPA; 22	SIL	NOG	ZOL	JAR	EST	NA	44

=== Complete World Touring Car Championship results ===
(key) (Races in bold indicate pole position) (Races in italics indicate fastest lap)

Year	Team	Car	1	2	3	4	5	6	7	8	9	10	11	DC	Points
1987	(Australia) Allan Moffat Enterprises	Holden VL Commodore SS Group A	MNZ ovr:1 cls:1	JAR; Ret	DIJ; Ret	NUR	SPA ovr:4 cls:1	BNO	SIL					NC	0
1987	(Australia) Allan Moffat Enterprises	Ford Sierra RS500								BAT; Ret	CLD; Ret	WEL	FJI	NC	0

† Not registered for series & points

=== Complete Bathurst 500/1000 results ===
Year	Team	Co-drivers	Car	Class	Laps	Pos.	Class pos.
1969	Ford Australia	(Australia) Alan Hamilton	Ford XW Falcon GTHO	D	129	4th	4th
1970	Ford Motor Co of Australia		Ford XW Falcon GTHO Phase II	E	130	1st	1st
1971	Ford Motor Co of Australia		Ford XY Falcon GT-HO Phase III	E	130	1st	1st
1972	Ford Motor Company of Australia		Ford XY Falcon GT-HO Phase III	D	122	9th	5th
1973	Ford Motor Company of Australia	(Australia) Ian Geoghegan	Ford XA Falcon GT Hardtop	D	163	1st	1st
1974	(Australia) Allan Moffat Racing	(West Germany) Dieter Glemser	Ford XB Falcon GT Hardtop	3001 – 6000c	92	DNF	DNF
1975	(Australia) Allan Moffat Racing	(Australia) Ian Geoghegan	Ford XB Falcon GT Hardtop	D	109	DNF	DNF
1976	(Australia) Moffat Ford Dealers	(Australia) Vern Schuppan	Ford XB Falcon GT Hardtop	3001cc - 6000cc	87	DNF	DNF
1977	(Australia) Moffat Ford Dealers	(Belgium) Jacky Ickx	Ford XC Falcon GS500 Hardtop	3001cc - 6000cc	163	1st	1st
1978	(Australia) Moffat Ford Dealers	(Belgium) Jacky Ickx	Ford XC Falcon Cobra	A	81	DNF	DNF
1979	(Australia) Allan Moffat Racing	(United Kingdom) John Fitzpatrick	Ford XC Falcon GS500 Hardtop	A	136	DNF	DNF
1980	(Australia) Allan Moffat Racing	(United Kingdom) John Fitzpatrick	Ford XD Falcon	3001-6000cc	3	DNF	DNF
1980	(Australia) Channel 7 Breville Racing	(Australia) Bob Morris (Australia) Bill O'Brien	Ford XD Falcon	3001-6000cc	88	DNF	DNF
1981	(Australia) Peter Stuyvesant International Racing	(United Kingdom) Derek Bell	Mazda RX-7	6 Cylinder & Rotary	119	3rd	1st
1982	(Australia) Peter Stuyvesant International Racing	(Japan) Yoshimi Katayama	Mazda RX-7	A	156	6th	6th
1983	(Australia) Peter Stuyvesant International	(Japan) Yoshimi Katayama	Mazda RX-7	A	162	2nd	2nd
1984	(Australia) Peter Stuyvesant International Racing	(Australia) Gregg Hansford	Mazda RX-7	Group C	161	3rd	3rd
1984	(Australia) Peter Stuyvesant International Racing	(Australia) Gregg Hansford	Mazda RX-7	Group C	15	DNF	DNF
1986	(Australia) Holden Dealer Team	(Australia) Peter Brock	Holden VK Commodore SS Group A	C	162	5th	4th
1987	(Australia) Allan Moffat Enterprises	(United Kingdom) Andy Rouse (Belgium) Thierry Tassin	Ford Sierra RS500	1	31	DNF	DNF
1988	(Australia) Allan Moffat Enterprises	(West Germany) Klaus Niedzwiedz (Australia) Gregg Hansford	Ford Sierra RS500	A	129	DNF	DNF

=== Complete Sandown Endurance results ===
Year	Team	Co-drivers	Car	Class	Laps	Pos.	Class pos.
1964	(Australia) Allan Moffat	(Australia) Jon Leighton	Ford Cortina Lotus	G	220	4th	1st
1965	(Australia) Allan Moffat	(New Zealand) Jim Palmer	Ford Cortina Lotus	C	224	DNF	DNF
1969	(Australia) Ford Motor Company	(Australia) John French	Ford XW Falcon GTHO	D	118	1st	1st
1970	(Australia) Ford Motor Company		Ford XW Falcon GTHO Phase II	E	130	1st	1st
1971	(Australia) Ford Motor Company		Ford XY Falcon GTHO Phase III	E	NA	DNF	DNF
1972	Ford Motor Company of Australia		Ford XY Falcon GTHO Phase III	D	11	DNF	DNF
1973	Ford Motor Company of Australia		Ford XA Falcon GT Hardtop	D	52	DNF	DNF
1974	(Australia) Allan Moffat Racing		Ford XB Falcon GT Hardtop	D	130	1st	1st
1975	(Australia) Allan Moffat Racing		Ford XB Falcon GT Hardtop	A	76	DNF	DNF
1976	(Australia) Moffat Ford Dealers		Ford XB Falcon GT Hardtop	D	128	2nd	2nd
1977	(Australia) Moffat Ford Dealers		Ford XC Falcon GS500 Hardtop	D	127	3rd	3rd
1978	(Australia) Moffat Ford Dealers		Ford XC Falcon Cobra	6000cc	NA	DNF	DNF
1979	(Australia) Allan Moffat Racing		Ford XC Falcon GS500 Hardtop	A	NA	DNF	DNF
1980	(Australia) Holden Dealer Team		Holden VC Commodore	A	107	3rd	3rd
1981	(Australia) Peter Stuyvesant International Racing		Mazda RX-7	A	115	6th	6th
1982	(Australia) Peter Stuyvesant International		Mazda RX-7	D	109	1st	1st
1983	(Australia) Peter Stuyvesant International Racing		Mazda RX-7	Over 3000cc	129	1st	1st
1984	(Australia) Peter Stuyvesant International Racing	(Australia) Gregg Hansford	Mazda RX-7	Over 3000cc	128	2nd	2nd
1986	(Australia) Holden Dealer Team	(Australia) Peter Brock	Holden VK Commodore SS Group A	B	128	4th	4th
1988	(Australia) Allan Moffat Enterprises	(Australia) Gregg Hansford	Ford Sierra RS500	A	129	1st	1st
1989	(Australia) Allan Moffat Enterprises	(Australia) Gregg Hansford	Ford Sierra RS500	A	12	DNF	DNF

=== Complete 24 Hours of Le Mans results ===
Year	Team	Co-drivers	Car	Class	Laps	Pos.	Class pos.
1980	(United States) Dick Barbour Racing	(United States) Bobby Rahal (United States) Bob Garretson	Porsche 935 K3	IMSA	134	DNF	DNF
1982	(Japan) Mazdaspeed Co. Ltd.	(Japan) Yojiro Terada (Japan) Takashi Yorino	Mazda RX-7	IMSA GTX	282	14th	6th

=== Complete 24 Hours of Daytona results ===
Year	Team	Co-drivers	Car	Class	Laps	Pos.	Class pos.
1968	(United States) Shelby Racing	(Australia) Horst Kwech (United States) George Follmer	Ford Mustang	TA+2.0	176	DNF	DNF
1980	(United States) JLC Racing	(United States) Amos Johnson (United States) Stu Fisher (United States) Brad Frisselle (United Kingdom) Tom Walkinshaw	Mazda RX-7	GTU	440	24th	9th
1982	(United States) Kent Racing	(United States) Kathy Rude (United States) Lee Mueller	Mazda RX-7	GTU	640	6th	1st
1985	(Australia) Allan Moffat Racing	(Australia) Gregg Hansford (Australia) Kevin Bartlett (Australia) Peter McLeod	Mazda RX-7	GTO	482	24th	7th

=== Complete Spa 24 Hours results ===
Year	Team	Co-drivers	Car	Class	Laps	Pos.	Class pos.
1986	(Australia) Holden Dealer Team	(Australia) Peter Brock (Australia) John Harvey	Holden VK Commodore SS Group A	Div.3	412	22nd	10th
1987	(Australia) Allan Moffat Enterprises	(Australia) John Harvey (Australia) Tony Mulvihill	Holden VL Commodore SS Group A	Div.3	468	4th	1st

=== Complete 12 Hours of Sebring results ===
Year	Team	Co-drivers	Car	Class	Laps	Pos.	Class pos.
1968	(United States) Shelby Racing	(Australia) Horst Kwech	Ford Mustang	TA5.0	63	DNF	DNF
1975	(West Germany) BMW Motorsport	(West Germany) Hans-Joachim Stuck (United Kingdom) Brian Redman (United States) Sam Posey	BMW 3.0 CSL	GTO	238	1st	1st

Sporting positions
Preceded by Colin Bond; Tony Roberts	Winner of the Bathurst 500; 1970-1971	Succeeded by Peter Brock
Preceded by Bob Jane	Winner of the Australian Touring Car Championship; 1973	Succeeded by Peter Brock
Preceded by Peter Brock	Winner of the Bathurst 1000; 1973 (with Ian Geoghegan)	Succeeded by John Goss; Kevin Bartlett
Preceded by Colin Bond	Winner of the Australian Touring Car Championship; 1976 & 1977	Succeeded by Peter Brock
Preceded by Bob Morris; John Fitzpatrick	Winner of the Bathurst 1000; 1977 (with Jacky Ickx)	Succeeded by Peter Brock; Jim Richards
Preceded by Dick Johnson	Winner of the Australian Touring Car Championship; 1983	Succeeded by Dick Johnson
Records
Preceded by Bob Jane; 10 wins (1962 – 1974)	Most ATCC round wins 25 (1964 – 1988), 11th win at Round 4 of the 1973 Australian Touring Car Championship	Succeeded by Peter Brock; 26 wins (1973 – 2004)
Preceded by Peter Brock; 26 wins (1973 – 2004)	Most ATCC round wins 32 (1964 – 1988), 27th win at Round 8 of the 1982 Australian Touring Car Championship	Succeeded by Peter Brock; 37 wins (1973 – 2004)
